= 2008 German Athletics Championships =

- Dates: 5–6 July 2008
- Host city: Nuremberg, Germany
- Venue: easyCredit-Stadion
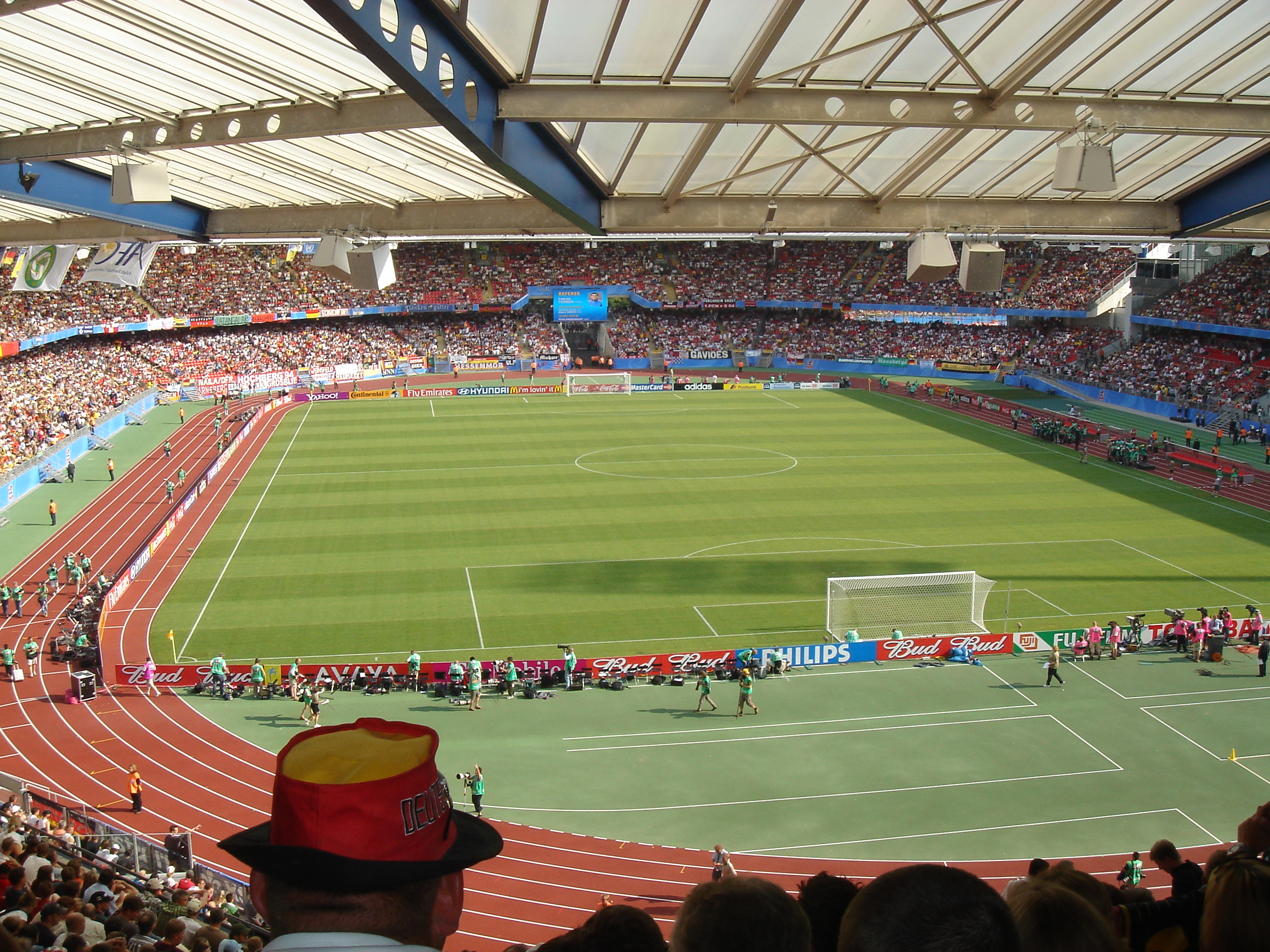

The 2008 German Athletics Championships were held at the easyCredit-Stadion in Nuremberg on 5–6 July 2008.

== Results ==
=== Men ===
	Gold		Silver		Bronze	
100 m (−0.2 m/s)	Tobias Unger	10.20	Stefan Schwab	10.29	Martin Keller	10.32
200 m (0.0 m/s)	Daniel Schnelting	20.54	Alexander Kosenkow	20.59	Aleixo-Platini Menga	20.70
400 m	Simon Kirch	45.57	Bastian Swillims	45.71	Ruwen Faller	46.05
800 m	Robin Schembera	1:51.47	René Herms	1:51.65	Sören Ludolph	1:52.12
1500 m	Stefan Eberhardt	3:41.54	Wolfram Müller	3:41.63	Christian Hengmith	3:43.46
5000 m	Arne Gabius	14:08.40	Zelalem Martel	14:08.59	Marc-André Kowalinski	14:10.72
10,000 m walk	André Höhne	40:22.68	Christopher Linke	43:36.80	Jan Albrecht	44:06.56
110 m hurdles (+0.2 m/s)	Thomas Blaschek	13.52	Alexander John	13.53	Willi Mathiszik	13.63
400 m hurdles	Lars Birger Hense	50.81	Thomas Goller	51.64	Philipp Bastians	51.79
3000 m steeplechase	Steffen Uliczka	8:46.69	Norbert Löwa	8:52.39	Martin Allgeyer	8:58.81
Triple jump	Charles Friedek	16.56	Andreas Pohle	16.50	Daniel Kohle	15.87
Long jump	Sebastian Bayer	8.15	Nils Winter	8.08	Peter Rapp	7.87
High jump	Raúl Spank	2.23	Matthias Haverney	2.23	Martin Günther	2.23
Pole vault	Tim Lobinger	5.75	Danny Ecker	5.75	Raphael Holzdeppe	5.75
Shot put	Ralf Bartels	20.60	Peter Sack	20.41	Sven-Eric Hahn	19.55
Discus throw	Robert Harting	66.26	Michael Möllenbeck	62.98	Sascha Hördt	59.66
Hammer throw	Markus Esser	76.75	Jens Rautenkranz	73.22	Karsten Kobs	72.73
Javelin throw	Tino Häber	80.15	Peter Esenwein	77.22	Manuel Nau	75.32
4 × 100 m relay	TV Wattenscheid I Jan-Christopher Schulte; Julian Reus; Sebastian Ernst; Ronny Ostwald	39.22	TV Gladbeck I Florian Lamers; Matthias Bos; Kevin Sellke; Sebastian Fricke	39.73	TSV Friedberg-Fauerbach I Michael Weber; Till Helmke; Nils Müller; Sebastian Schäfer	39.79
4 × 400 m relay	SCC Berlin I Sven Buggel; Florian Seitz; Frederic Zweigner; Julian Kiwus	3:11.15	TSV Friedberg-Fauerbach I Christian Klein; Florian Schwalm; Sebastian Schäfer; Michael Weber	3:11.82	VfL Sindelfingen I Stefan Kinzy; Hannes Scharpf; Steffen Gann; Manuel Ilg	3:14.10

=== Women ===
	Gold		Silver		Bronze	
100 m (−0.8 m/s)	Verena Sailer	11.28	Cathleen Tschirch	11.45	Anne Möllinger	11.48
200 m (0.0 m/s)	Mareike Peters	23.62	Karoline Köhler	23.72	Anja Wackershauser	23.75
400 m	Claudia Hoffmann	52.12	Florence Ekpo-Umoh	52.32	Sorina Nwachukwu	52.64
800 m	Jana Hartmann		Monika Gradzki		Annett Horna	
1500 m	Denise Krebs	4:22.23	Katrin Trauth	4:22.46	Agata Strausa	4:24.73
5000 m	Sabrina Mockenhaupt	15:38.33	Ingalena Heuck	16:35.93	Birte Bultmann	16:37.77
5000 m walk	Melanie Seeger	21:22.70	Sabine Zimmer	21:34.63	Christin Elß	24:08.53
100 m hurdles (0.0 m/s)	Carolin Nytra	12.87	Nadine Hildebrand	13.08	Anne-Kathrin Elbe	13.12
400 m hurdles	Jonna Tilgner	55.73	Tina Kron	57.11	Claudia Wehrsen	57.71
3000 m steeplechase	Antje Möldner	9:50.05	Julia Hiller	10:07.65	Verena Dreier	10:12.62
Triple jump	Katja Demut	13.87	Katharina Schreck	13.67	Ekaterina Menne	13.28
Long jump	Sophie Krauel	6.40	Kathrin van Bühren	6.30	Angela Dies	6.28
High jump	Ariane Friedrich	2.00	Annett Engel	1.87	Meike Kröger	1.87
Pole vault	Carolin Hingst	4.55	Anastasija Reiberger	4.50 =	Silke Spiegelburg	4.50
Shot put	Nadine Kleinert	19.67	Christina Schwanitz	19.03	Denise Hinrichs	18.60
Discus throw	Sabine Rumpf	57.50	Nadine Müller	57.43	Ulrike Giesa	55.59
Hammer throw	Betty Heidler	68.64	Andrea Bunjes	64.00	Simone Mathes	63.85
Javelin throw	Christina Obergföll	62.18	Steffi Nerius	61.91	Linda Stahl	60.18
4 × 100 m relay	LG Weserbergland I Nina Giebel; Cathleen Tschirch; Jala Gangnus; Nicole Marahrens	44.28	TV Wattenscheid 01 I Karoline Köhler; Katja Wakan; Esther Cremer; Sosthene Moguenara	44.63	LAC Quelle Fürth/München I Anja Wurm; Verena Sailer; Martha Koj; Ecaterina Slizevschi	44.65
4 × 400 m relay	TSV Bayer 04 Leverkusen I Caroline Dieckhöner; Maren Schott; Annett Horna; Sorina Nwachukwu	3:40.94	USC Mainz I Stefanie Gubitz; Sabine Bachmann; Gloria Metzler; Maral Feizbakhsh	3:44.03	LG Rhein-Wied I Rebekka Kramer; Annika Schmitt; Clara Küpper; Sylvia Semkowicz	3:44.26
