= 2007 German Athletics Championships =

- Dates: 21–22 July 2007
- Host city: Erfurt, Germany
- Venue: Steigerwaldstadion
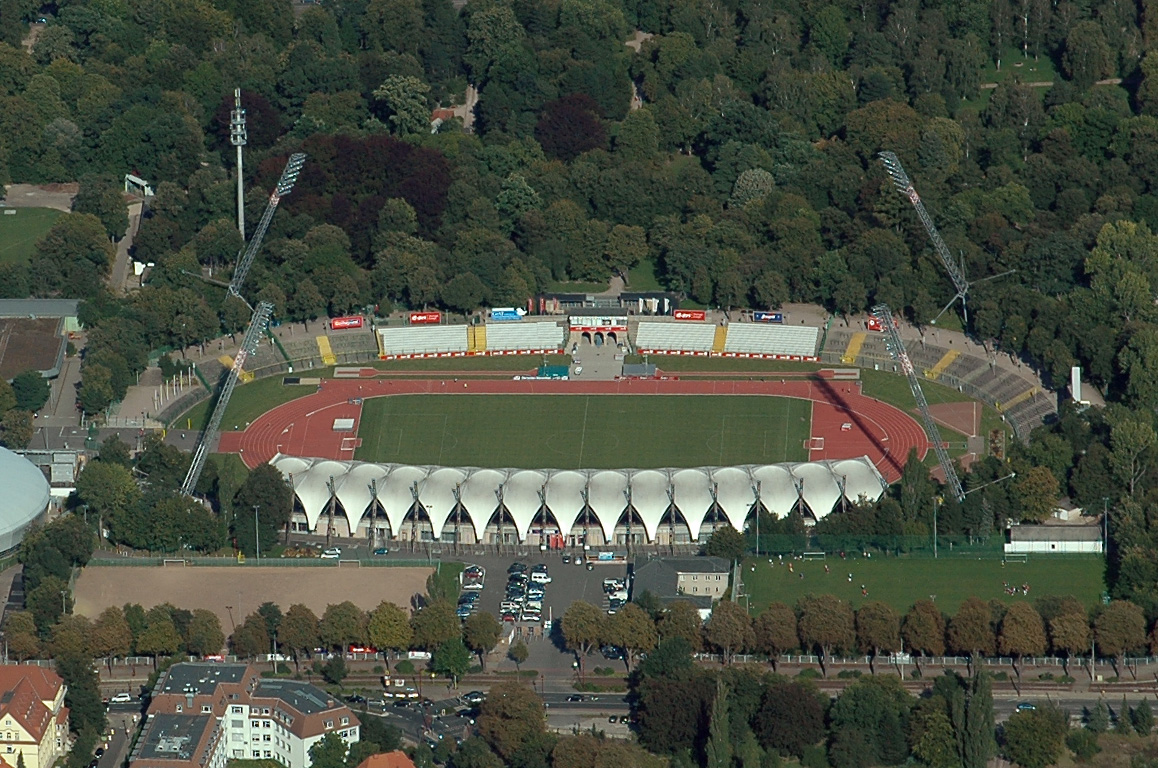
- Records set: 1 Championship Record

The 2007 German Athletics Championships were held at the Steigerwaldstadion in Erfurt on 21–22 July 2007.

== Results ==
=== Men ===
	Gold		Silver		Bronze	
100 m (+0.3 m/s)	Alexander Kosenkow	10.35	Ronny Ostwald	10.37	Marius Broening	10.41
200 m (−0.7 m/s)	Daniel Schnelting	20.88	Alexander Kosenkow	21.04	Till Helmke	21.06
400 m	Bastian Swillims	46.21	Kamghe Gaba	46.59	Ingo Schultz	46.66
800 m	Moritz Höft	1:48.30	René Herms	1:48.61	Martin Conrad	1:48.66
1500 m	Carsten Schlangen	3:41.59	Franek Haschke	3:43.32	Wolfram Müller	3:43.74
5000 m	Arne Gabius	14:03.97	André Pollmächer	14:04.22	Christian Glatting	14:07.24
10,000 m walk	André Höhne	40:08.71	Michael Krause	40:59.87	Jan Albrecht	41:13.70
110 m hurdles (−0.5 m/s)	Thomas Blaschek	13.59	Paul Dittmer	13.86	Alexander John	13.87
400 m hurdles	Thomas Goller	50.97	Michael Pfaff	51.59	Adrian Schürmann	51.87
3000 m steeplechase	Filmon Ghirmai	8:39.35	Norbert Löwa	8:45.95	Christian Biele	8:47.03
Triple jump	Andreas Pohle	16.65	Thomas Moede	16.34	Michael Höllwarth	15.29
Long jump	Christian Reif	8.08	Peter Rapp	7.74	Kofi Amoah Prah	7.70
High jump	Benjamin Lauckner	2.26	Matthias Haverney	2.23	Sebastian Kneifel; Matthias Franta	2.14
Pole vault	Danny Ecker	5.70	Björn Otto	5.70	Alexander Straub	5.50
Shot put	Peter Sack	20.68	Ralf Bartels	20.38	Marco Schmidt	19.41
Discus throw	Robert Harting	63.79	Michael Möllenbeck	60.42	Heinrich Seitz	57.65
Hammer throw	Markus Esser	78.48	Karsten Kobs	75.61	Jens Rautenkranz	74.62
Javelin throw	Stephan Steding	80.44	Stefan Wenk	79.40	Christian Nicolay	79.36
4 × 100 m relay	TV Wattenscheid I Jan-Christopher Schulte; Marc Blume; Sebastian Ernst; Ronny Ostwald	39.54	TSV Friedberg-Fauerbach I Florian Schwalm; Till Helmke; Nils Müller; Sebastian Schäfer	39.96	TV Gladbeck I Peter Pyzera; Matthias Bos; Kevin Sellke; Florian Lamers	40.38
4 × 400 m relay	LG Eintracht Frankfurt I Tilo Ruch; Sebastian Gatzka; Stefan Kuhlee; Kamghe Gaba	3:09.08	TV Wattenscheid I Henning Hackelbusch; Thomas Goller; Moritz Cleve; Bastian Swillims	3:09.11	TSV Friedberg-Fauerbach I Christian Klein; Florian Schwalm; Sebastian Schäfer; Niklas Zender	3:09.79

=== Women ===
	Gold		Silver		Bronze	
100 m (+0.1 m/s)	Verena Sailer	11.39	Cathleen Tschirch	11.47	Katja Wakan	11.48
200 m (+1.5 m/s)	Cathleen Tschirch	23.07	Johanna Kedzierski	23.47	Sandra Möller	23.84
400 m	Claudia Hoffmann	52.40	Janin Lindenberg	53.32	Jana Neubert	53.65
800 m	Monika Gradzki	2:04.97	Janina Goldfuß	2:06.46	Agata Strausa	2:06.69
1500 m	Antje Möldner	4:16.12	Katrin Trauth	4:22.33	Denise Krebs	4:23.60
5000 m	Sabrina Mockenhaupt	15:23.71	Simret Restle	16:11.11	Melanie Kraus	16:14.79
5000 m walk	Ulrike Sischka	23:22.00	Maja Landmann	23:53.27	Sonja Birkemeyer	24:19.33
100 m hurdles (0.0 m/s)	Carolin Nytra	13.24	Annette Funck	13.25	Stephanie Lichtl	13.40
400 m hurdles	Ulrike Urbansky	55.21	Tina Kron	55.58	Jonna Tilgner	56.96
3000 m steeplechase	Julia Hiller	10:11.47	Verena Dreier	10:12.48	Melanie Schulz	10:26.83
Triple jump	Katja Demut	13.91	Katja Pobanz	13.36	Sandra Busch	13.22
Long jump	Bianca Kappler	6.67	Urszula Gutowicz-Westhoff	6.61	Sonja Kesselschläger	6.32
High jump	Ariane Friedrich	1.93	Annett Engel	1.93	Sophia Sagonas	1.80
Pole vault	Silke Spiegelburg	4.50	Julia Hütter	4.45	Carolin Hingst	4.40
Shot put	Petra Lammert	19.30	Nadine Kleinert	17.90	Nadine Beckel	17.42
Discus throw	Franka Dietzsch	62.83	Ulrike Giesa	57.35	Nadine Müller	56.83
Hammer throw	Betty Heidler	74.94	Kathrin Klaas	70.58	Andrea Bunjes	69.06
Javelin throw	Christina Obergföll	66.59	Annika Suthe	56.88	Linda Stahl	55.89
4 × 100 m relay	LG Weserbergland I Nina Giebel; Jala Gangnus; Cathleen Tschirch; Nicole Marahrens	44.46	TV Wattenscheid 01 I Yasmin Kwadwo; Katja Wakan; Sandra Möller; Karoline Köhler	44.93	TSV Bayer 04 Leverkusen I Anne-Kathrin Elbe; Sorina Nwachukwu; Mareike Peters; Katharina Naumann	45.06
4 × 400 m relay	TSV Bayer 04 Leverkusen I Sorina Nwachukwu; Maike Wilden; Natalie Mehring; Caroline Dieckhöner	3:38.35	LT DSHS Köln I Claudia Wehrsen; Natalie Kleinwort; Anne Schiffer; Barbara Gähling	3:42.75	SC Neubrandenburg I Sonja Kesselschläger; Sabrina Krüger; Julia Mächtig; Maren Schwerdtner	3:43.16
