= 2010 German Athletics Championships =

- Dates: 17–18 July 2010
- Host city: Braunschweig, Germany
- Venue: Eintracht-Stadion
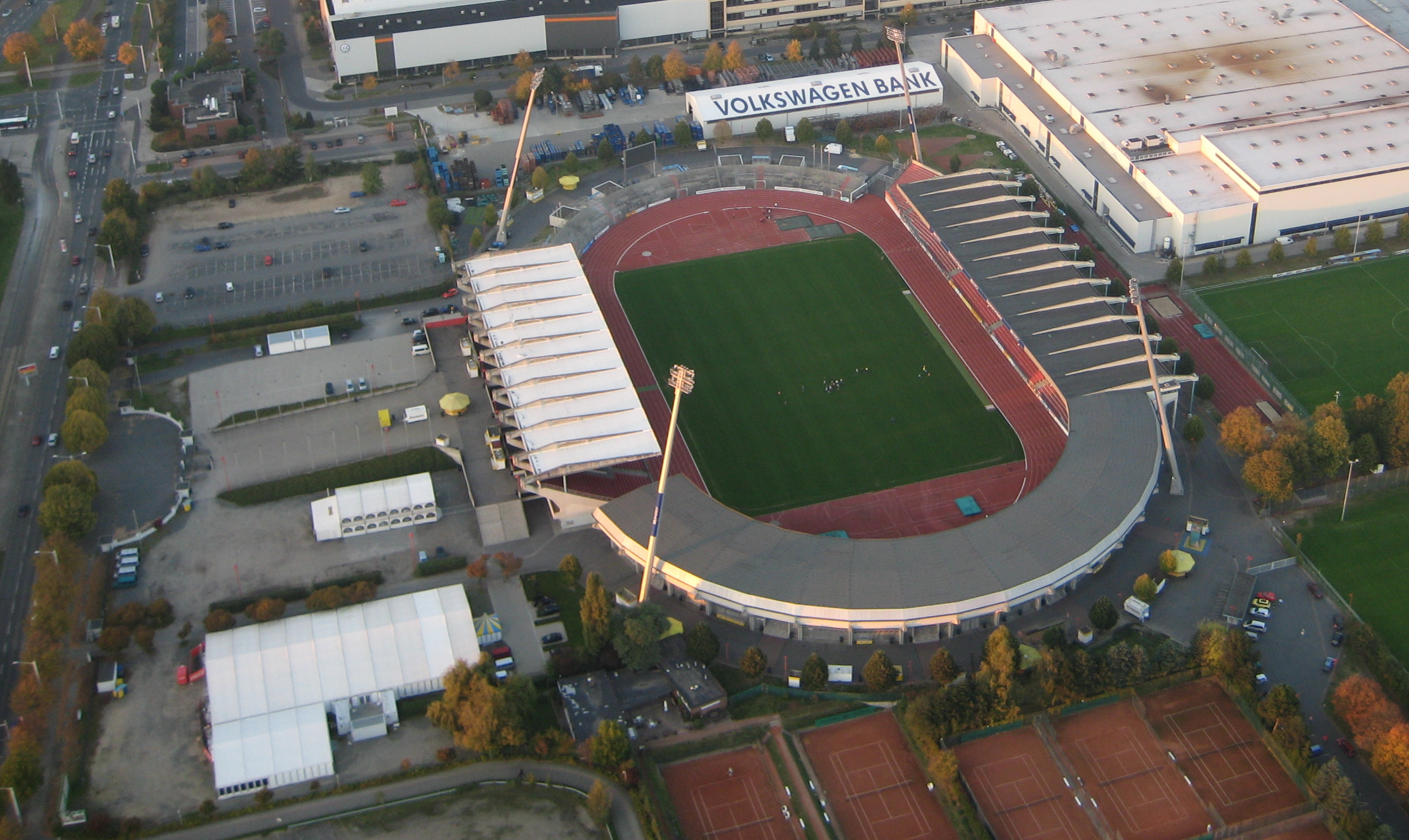
- Participation: 1,300 approx. athletes
- Records set: 2 Championship Records

The 2010 German Athletics Championships were held at the Eintracht-Stadion in Braunschweig on 17–18 July 2010.

== Results ==
=== Men ===
	Gold		Silver		Bronze	
100 m (+1.2 m/s)	Alexander Kosenkow	10.29	Christian Blum	10.33	Marius Broening	10.37
200 m (−1.7 m/s)	Daniel Schnelting	20.73	Sebastian Ernst	21.06	Robert Hering	21.17
400 m	Kamghe Gaba	45.92	Thomas Schneider	46.25	Eric Krüger	46.52
800 m	Sören Ludolph	1:50.54	Robin Schembera	1:50.56	Sebastian Keiner	1:51.36
1500 m	Carsten Schlangen	3:45.44	Moritz Waldmann	3:46.82	Arthur Lenz	3:47.58
5000 m	Arne Gabius	13:52.03	Filmon Ghirmai	13:53.43	Philipp Pflieger	13:54.03
10,000 m walk	André Höhne	40:32.15	Christopher Linke	40:49.43	Carsten Schmidt	41:35.93
110 m hurdles (+0.1 m/s)	Matthias Bühler	13.59	Helge Schwarzer	13.79	Marlon Odom	13.80
400 m hurdles	Georg Fleischhauer	50.11	Silvio Schirrmeister	50.12	Stephan Stoll	50.37
3000 m steeplechase	Steffen Uliczka	8:38.29	Felix Hentschel	8:46.38	Stephan Hohl	8:48.45
Triple jump	Andreas Pohle	16.28	Matthias Uhrig	15.79	Daniel Kohle	15.78
Long jump	Christian Reif	8.18	Sebastian Bayer	7.71	Nils Winter	7.71
High jump	Raúl Spank	2.25	Martin Günther	2.22	Matthias Haverney	2.22
Pole vault	Malte Mohr	5.75	Raphael Holzdeppe	5.70	Fabian Schulze	5.60
Shot put	Ralf Bartels	20.54	David Storl	20.45	Marco Schmidt	19.72
Discus throw	Robert Harting	68.67	Martin Wierig	63.62	Markus Münch	59.18
Hammer throw	Markus Esser	78.46	Benjamin Boruschewski	74.94	Sven Möhsner	73.45
Javelin throw	Matthias de Zordo	80.05	Mark Frank	77.23	Björn Lange	74.72
4 × 100 m relay	TV Wattenscheid 01 I Jan-Christopher Schulte; Sebastian Ernst; Alexander Kosenkow; Jan Quade	39.67	LG Olympia Dortmund I Joachim Bicheler; Oleg Kraft; Nando Simon; Sebastian Fiene	41.66	SCC Berlin I George Petzold; Eric Franke; Maximilian Kessler; Raschid Semghoun	41.74
4 × 400 m relay	LG Eintracht Frankfurt I Marius Horbank; Clemens Höfer; Michael Pflüger; Kamghe Gaba	3:10.45	SC Potsdam I Tobias Schneider; Maximilian Kriese; Björn Leow; Thomas Schneider	3:11.19	TV Wattenscheid 01 I Alexander Meisolle; Mirko Schmidt; Jörn Niedereichholz; Bastian Swillims	3:11.83

=== Women ===
	Gold		Silver		Bronze	
100 m (−0.6 m/s)	Verena Sailer	11.23	Anne Möllinger	11.48	Yasmin Kwadwo	11.50
200 m (+0.9 m/s)	Esther Cremer	23.47	Mareike Peters	23.81	Sara Jäpel	23.96
400 m	Janin Lindenberg	52.32	Claudia Hoffmann	52.60	Claudia Marx	53.26
800 m	Jana Hartmann	2:07.41	Annett Horna	2:07.72	Anja Claußnitzer	2:07.83
1500 m	Diana Sujew	4:13.69	Anne Kesselring	4:17.17	Elina Sujew	4:18.15
5000 m	Sabrina Mockenhaupt	15:36.17	Simret Restle	16:09.23	Veronica Pohl	16:24.95
5000 m walk	Christin Elß	23:38.25	Kathrin Schulze	24:10.37	Sophie Stellmach	26:14.00
100 m hurdles (−0.9 m/s)	Carolin Nytra	12.71	Cindy Roleder	13.08	Nadine Hildebrand	13.08
400 m hurdles	Fabienne Kohlmann	56.14	Jill Richards	56.34	Jonna Tilgner	56.82
3000 m steeplechase	Susi Lutz	10:09.20	Jana Sussmann	10:11.15	Birte Schütz	10:14.65
Triple jump	Katja Demut	14.15	Kristin Gierisch	13.69	Jenny Elbe	13.50
Long jump	Bianca Kappler	6.59	Nadja Käther	6.50	Melanie Bauschke	6.47
High jump	Ariane Friedrich	2.00	Meike Kröger	1.88	Annett Engel	1.88
Pole vault	Silke Spiegelburg	4.65	Lisa Ryzih	4.60 =	Carolin Hingst	4.60
Shot put	Nadine Kleinert	19.12	Petra Lammert	19.05	Denise Hinrichs	18.34
Discus throw	Nadine Müller	63.07	Sabine Rumpf	62.21	Heike Koderisch	58.62
Hammer throw	Betty Heidler	75.82	Kathrin Klaas	68.85	Andrea Bunjes	66.39
Javelin throw	Katharina Molitor	64.27	Christina Obergföll	63.13	Linda Stahl	61.83
4 × 100 m relay	TV Wattenscheid 01 I Karoline Köhler; Katja Tengel; Maike Dix; Yasmin Kwadwo	44.08	MTG Mannheim I Tamara Seel; Nora Bäcker; Anne Möllinger; Verena Sailer	44.12	TSV Bayer 04 Leverkusen I Anne-Kathrin Elbe; Mareike Peters; Cathleen Tschirch; Julia Förster	44.86
4 × 400 m relay	TSV Bayer 04 Leverkusen I Julia Förster; Annett Horna; Caroline Dieckhöner; Laura Hansen	3:38.84	Dresdner SC I Julia Kohser; Lisa Mai; Jenny Elbe; Claudia Marx	3:41.57	TSV Bayer 04 Leverkusen II Natalie Mehring; Maren Schott; Sabrina Buchrucker; Maike Jeanette Wilden	3:42.18
