= 2009 German Athletics Championships =

- Dates: 4–5 July 2009
- Host city: Ulm, Germany
- Venue: Donaustadion
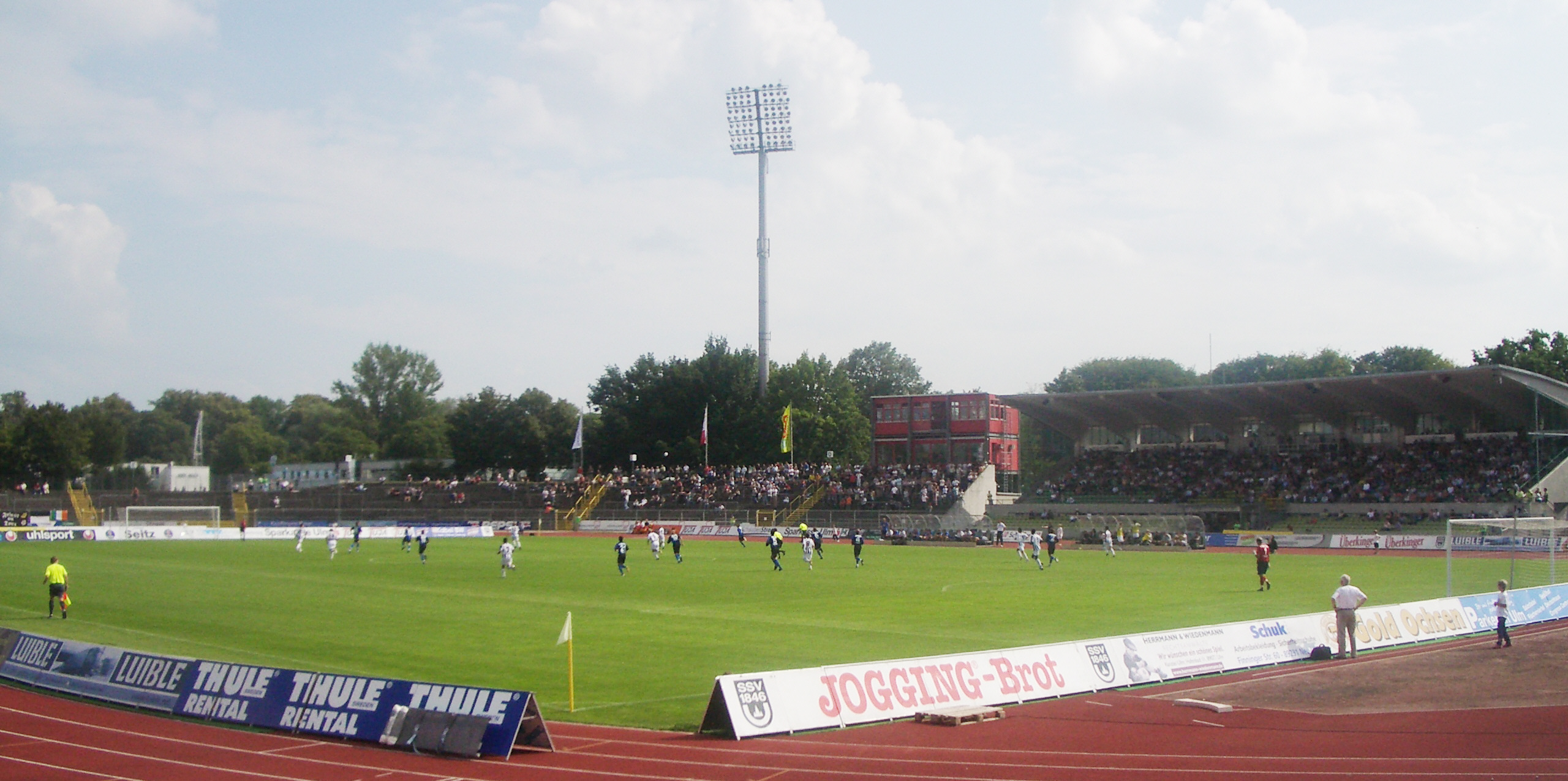
- Records set: 2 Championship Records

The 2009 German Athletics Championships were held at the Donaustadion in Ulm on 4–5 July 2009.

== Results ==
=== Men ===
	Gold		Silver		Bronze	
100 m (−2.5 m/s)	Tobias Unger	10.18	Marius Broening	10.24	Alexander Kosenkow	10.28
200 m (+1.0 m/s)	Robert Hering	20.41	Alexander Kosenkow	21.43	Aleixo-Platini Menga	20.65
400 m	Martin Grothkopp	45.94	Jonas Plass	46.00	Ruwen Faller	46.00
800 m	Robin Schembera	1:46.53	Sören Ludolph	1:46.69	Nils Schumann	1:47.28
1500 m	Carsten Schlangen	3:43.66	Stefan Eberhardt	3:43.68	Jonas Hamm	3:45.82
5000 m	Arne Gabius	13:50.48	Musa Roba-Kinkal	13:59.11	Christian Glatting	14:01.37
10,000 m walk	André Höhne	40:38.49	Christopher Linke	41:42.48	Carsten Schmidt	42:40.21
110 m hurdles (+0.7 m/s)	Matthias Bühler	13.36	Helge Schwarzer	13.39	Thomas Blaschek	13.53
400 m hurdles	Thomas Goller	49.20	Christian Duma	50.59	Stephan Stoll	50.79
3000 m steeplechase	Filmon Ghirmai	8:38.97	Steffen Uliczka	8:40.08	Stephan Hohl	9:06.62
Triple jump	Andreas Pohle	16.30	Konstantin Gens	16.22	Charles Friedek	16.07
Long jump	Sebastian Bayer	8.49, EL	Nils Winter	8.04	Mario Kral	7.92
High jump	Eike Onnen	2.26	Tim Riedel	2.26	Raúl Spank	2.23
Pole vault	Alexander Straub	5.70	Tobias Scherbarth	5.70	Björn Otto	5.70 =
Shot put	Ralf Bartels	20.62	Peter Sack	20.01	David Storl	19.84
Discus throw	Robert Harting	67.69	Markus Münch	62.09	Martin Wierig	61.96
Hammer throw	Sergej Litvinov	76.46	Markus Esser	76.38	Jens Rautenkranz	73.37
Javelin throw	Mark Frank	82.08	Matthias de Zordo	78.22	Manuel Nau	76.12
4 × 100 m relay	TSV Bayer 04 Leverkusen I	39.68	TV Wattenscheid 01 I	39.83	SCC Berlin I	40.99
4 × 400 m relay	TV Wattenscheid 01 I	3:08.55	Dresdner SC I	3:09.02	SCC Berlin I	3:09.88

=== Women ===
	Gold		Silver		Bronze	
100 m (−0.2 m/s)	Verena Sailer	11.18 EL	Marion Wagner	11.31	Lisa Schorr	11.34
200 m (−0.5 m/s)	Cathleen Tschirch	23.36	Maike Dix	23.52	Marion Wagner	23.65
400 m	Sorina Nwachukwu	52.33	Esther Cremer	53.21	Florence Ekpo-Umoh	53.68
800 m	Janina Goldfuß	2:03.96	Annett Horna	2:04.53	Claudia Hoffmann	2:04.78
1500 m	Denise Krebs	4:18.77	Corinna Harrer	4:19.76	Anne Kesselring	4:19.84
5000 m	Sabrina Mockenhaupt	16:15.65	Birte Bultmann	16:27.82	Ulrike Maisch	16:28.23
5000 m walk	Sabine Krantz	21:14.75	Sandra Krause	23:54.89	Bianca Schenker	24:09.41
100 m hurdles (−0.1 m/s)	Carolin Nytra	12.78	Stephanie Lichtl	13.03	Stefanie Saumweber	13.32
400 m hurdles	Jonna Tilgner	55.71	Tina Kron	56.39	Fabienne Kohlmann	57.10
3000 m steeplechase	Antje Möldner	9:44.04	Verena Dreier	10:02.46	Julia Hiller	10:13.18
Triple jump	Katja Demut	14.20	Ekaterina Menne	13.74	Kristin Gierisch	13.73
Long jump	Sophie Krauel	6.70	Beatrice Marschek	6.67	Bianca Kappler	6.64
High jump	Ariane Friedrich	2.01	Meike Kröger	1.93	Melanie Bauschke	1.87
Pole vault	Silke Spiegelburg	4.65	Kristina Gadschiew	4.50	Lisa Ryzih	4.40 =
Shot put	Denise Hinrichs	19.06	Nadine Kleinert	19.00	Christina Schwanitz	18.77
Discus throw	Nadine Müller	59.98	Franka Dietzsch	59.09	Jessica Kolotzei	57.46
Hammer throw	Betty Heidler	74.25	Kathrin Klaas	72.76	Andrea Bunjes	64.49
Javelin throw	Steffi Nerius	62.47	Christina Obergföll	62.09	Katharina Molitor	59.64
4 × 100 m relay	TV Wattenscheid 01 I	44.08	TSV Bayer 04 Leverkusen I	44.12	MTG Mannheim I	44.86
4 × 400 m relay	TSV Bayer 04 Leverkusen I	3:35.35	SC Potsdam I	3:38.25	LG Olympia Dortmund I	3:41.42
