= 2012 German Athletics Championships =

- Dates: 16–17 June 2012
- Host city: Bochum-Wattenscheid, Germany
- Venue: Lohrheidestadion
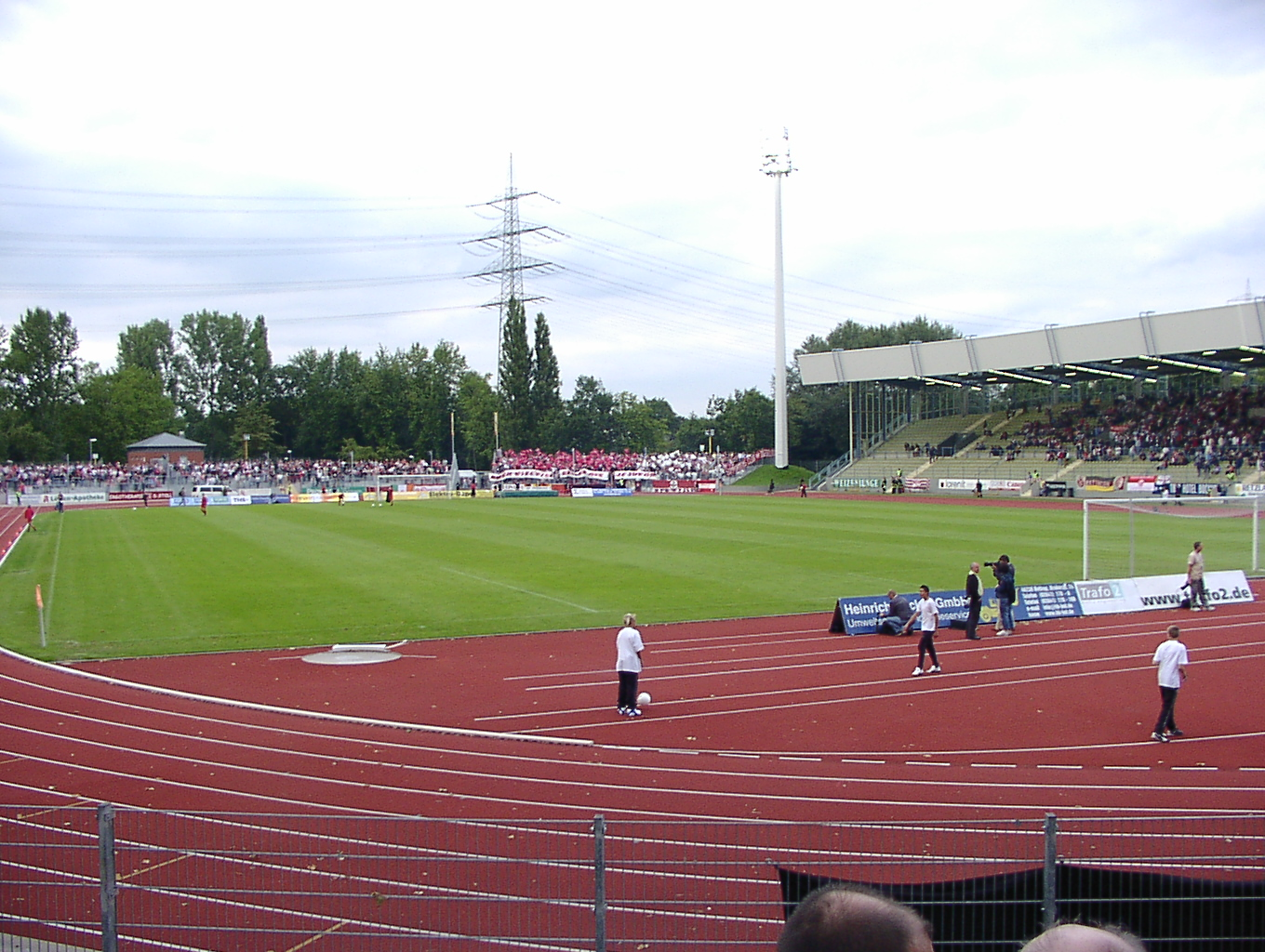

The 2012 German Athletics Championships were held at the Lohrheidestadion in Bochum-Wattenscheid on 16–17 June 2012.

== Results ==
=== Men ===
	Gold		Silver		Bronze	
100 m (+2.7 m/s)	Lucas Jakubczyk	10.16	Aleixo Platini Menga	10.16	Julian Reus	10.26
200 m (+1.1 m/s)	Julian Reus	20.58	Aleixo Platini Menga	20.64	Sebastian Ernst	20.72
400 m	Eric Krüger	46.15	Thomas Schneider	46.28	Kamghe Gaba	46.46
800 m	Sören Ludolph	1:49.04	Sebastian Keiner	1:49.28	Dennis Krüger	1:49.28
1500 m	Florian Orth	3:43.71	Carsten Schlangen	3:44.28	Heyi Homiyu Tesfaye	3:45.67
5000 m	Arne Gabius	13:51.78	Philipp Pflieger	13:55.31	André Pollmächer	14:00.97
110 m hurdles (+1.6 m/s)	Alexander John	13.52	Matthias Bühler	13.66	Erik Balnuweit	13.68
400 m hurdles	Georg Fleischhauer	49.74	Tobias Giehl	49.82	David Gollnow	49.87
3000 m steeplechase	Benedikt Karus	8:42.81	Michael Wilms	8:45.73	Tim Stegemann	8:48.12
High jump	Eike Onnen	2.25	Matthias Haverney	2.22	Raúl Spank	2.22
Pole vault	Malte Mohr	5.82	Raphael Holzdeppe	5.77	Karsten Dilla	5.72 =
Triple jump	Andreas Pohle	16.64	Manuel Ziegler	16.26	Randy Lewis	16.12
Long jump	Sebastian Bayer	7.91	Julian Howard	7.82	Alyn Camara	7.73
Shot put	David Storl	20.96	Marco Schmidt	20.14	Tobias Dahm	19.56
Discus throw	Robert Harting	67.79	Martin Wierig	64.48	Markus Münch	63.17
Hammer throw	Markus Esser	75.38	Andreas Sahner	70.72	Johannes Bichler	70.19
Javelin throw	Thomas Röhler	78.58	Tino Häber	76.94	Lars Hamann	75.87
4 × 100 m relay	TV Wattenscheid 01 I Christian Blum; Julian Reus; Sebastian Ernst; Robin Erewa	39.23	SCC Berlin I Lucas Jakubczyk; Maximilian Kessler; Robert Hind; Eric Franke	39.45	LAV Tübingen I Simon Bräuchle; Tobias Fluck; Hannes Noller; Marius Broening	40.26
4 × 400 m relay	LG Stadtwerke München I Kamghe Gaba; Benedikt Wiesend; Michael Wilms; David Gollnow	3:07.91	LG Eintracht Frankfurt I Michael Pflüger; Benjamin Jonas; Niklas Zender; Clemens Höfer	3:08.57	Dresdner SC I Georg Fleischhauer; Jan Riedel; Florian Handt; Thomas Schneider	3:09.37

=== Women ===
	Gold		Silver		Bronze	
100 m (+3.0 m/s)	Verena Sailer	11.22	Tatjana Pinto	11.26	Anne Cibis	11.41
200 m (−0.3 m/s)	Inna Weit	23.52	Anne Cibis	23.73	Christina Frewer	23.85
400 m	Esther Cremer	52.21	Janin Lindenberg	52.81	Fabienne Kohlmann	53.84
800 m	Anne Kesselring	2:04.60	Karoline Pilawa	2:04.92	Sonja Mosler	2:05.25
1500 m	Corinna Harrer	4:11.04	Denise Krebs	4:11.38	Diana Sujew	4:11.53
5000 m	Sabrina Mockenhaupt	15:47.01	Eleni Gebrehiwot	15:47.48	Lisa Hahner	15:49.83
100 m hurdles (+1.7 m/s)	Carolin Nytra	12.74	Cindy Roleder	12.91	Nadine Hildebrand	13.08
400 m hurdles	Tina Kron	57.36	Claudia Wehrsen	58.09	Frederike Hogrebe	58.43
3000 m steeplechase	Antje Möldner-Schmidt	9:42.42	Sanaa Koubaa	9:51.77	Verena Dreier	10:04.31
High jump	Ariane Friedrich	1.86	Marie-Laurence Jungfleisch	1.82	Nele Hollmann; Julia Straub	1.82; 1.82
Pole vault	Silke Spiegelburg	4.70	Lisa Ryzih	4.65 =	Martina Strutz	4.45
Triple jump	Jenny Elbe	14.06	Katja Demut	13.68	Kristin Gierisch	13.43
Long jump	Beatrice Marscheck	6.49 =	Melanie Bauschke	6.47	Ksenia Achkinadze	6.45
Shot put	Nadine Kleinert	19.18	Josephine Terlecki	18.87	Denise Hinrichs	18.36
Discus throw	Nadine Müller	66.47	Julia Fischer	63.21	Anna Rüh	63.14
Hammer throw	Betty Heidler	73.65	Daniela Manz	61.90	Carolin Paesler	61.46
Javelin throw	Christina Obergföll	65.86	Linda Stahl	64.35	Katharina Molitor	63.20
4 × 100 m relay	TV Wattenscheid 01 I Christina Frewer; Esther Cremer; Maike Dix; Karoline Köhler	44.08	MTG Mannheim I Nadine Gonska; Carina Frey; Johanna Kedzierski; Deborah Hufschmidt	45.38	LC Paderborn I Britta Tomkel; Inna Weit; Sarah Noll; Sinje Florczak	45.94
4 × 400 m relay	LT DSHS Köln I Frederike Hogrebe; Lara Hoffmann; Kim Carina Schmidt; Claudia Wehrsen	3:36.42	TV Wattenscheid 01 I Maral Feizbakhsh; Denise Krebs; Janina Balke; Esther Cremer	3:37.97	TSV Bayer 04 Leverkusen I Kira Biesenbach; Carolin Walter; Julia Schaefers; Julia Förster	3:38.33
