= 2011 German Athletics Championships =

- Dates: 23–24 July 2011
- Host city: Kassel, Germany
- Venue: Auestadion
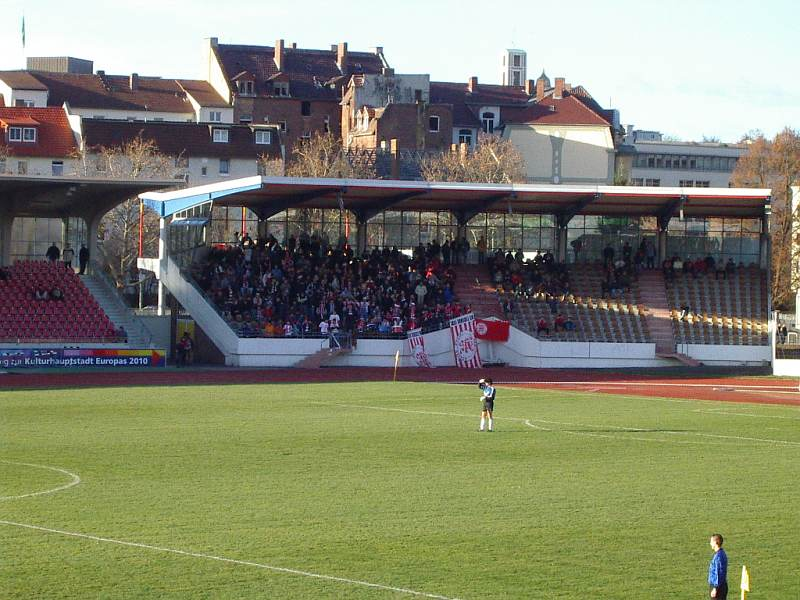
- Records set: 2 Championship Records

The 2011 German Athletics Championships were held at the Auestadion in Kassel on 23–24 July 2011.

== Results ==
=== Men ===
Event	Gold		Silver		Bronze	
100 m (Wind: −0.2 m/s)	Tobias Unger	10.40	Christian Blum	10.43	Alex Schaf	10.48
200 m (Wind: −0.7 m/s)	Robin Erewa	21.05	Sebastian Ernst	21.14	Sven Knipphals	21.45
400 m	Jonas Plass	46.59	Eric Krüger	46.96	Thomas Schneider	47.15
800 m	Sören Ludolph	1:50.42	Timo Benitz	1:50.69	Sebastian Keiner	1:50.70
1500 m	Carsten Schlangen	3:57.94	Florian Orth	3:58.37	Jonas Hamm	3:58.88
5000 m	Arne Gabius	13:58.87	Richard Ringer	14:02.08	Julian Flügel	14:03.50
10,000 m walk	Christopher Linke	39:52.96	André Höhne	40:10.99	Carsten Schmidt	41:28.14
110 m hurdles (Wind: −1.0 m/s)	Matthias Bühler	13.66	Erik Balnuweit	13.68	Marlon Odom	13.72
400 m hurdles	David Gollnow	49.56	Tobias Giehl	49.81	Daniel Wienands	51.29
3000 m steeplechase	Steffen Uliczka	8:33.47	Benedikt Karus	8:45.71	Hannes Liebach	8:52.38
Triple jump	Andreas Pohle	16.59	Matthias Uhrig	16.50	Daniel Kohle	16.25
Long jump	Sebastian Bayer	8.17	Christian Reif	7.82	Oliver Koenig	7.79
High jump	Raúl Spank	2.31	Matthias Haverney	2.28	Tim Riedel	2.19
Pole vault	Malte Mohr	5.72	Fabian Schulze	5.62	Karsten Dilla	5.62
Shot put	David Storl	20.35	Marco Schmidt	19.49	Robert Dippl	18.58
Discus throw	Robert Harting	65.72	Markus Münch	61.47	Daniel Jasinski	58.42
Hammer throw	Markus Esser	78.44	Jens Rautenkranz	73.70	Benjamin Boruschewski	71.73
Javelin throw	Matthias de Zordo	81.06	Mark Frank	81.01	Björn Lange	75.81
4 × 100 m relay	SCC Berlin I George Petzold; Eric Franke; Maximilian Kessler; Lucas Jakubczyk	39.81	LG Stadtwerke München I Tobias Unger; Marcus Mikulla; Florian Rentz; Oliver Koenig	40.03	TV Gladbeck II Thomas Lohrengel; Matthias Bos; Florian Lamers; Sebastian Fricke	40.40
4 × 400 m relay	StG Asics Wendelstein/Erding I Benedikt Wiesend; Jonas Plass; Markus Kiefl; David Gollnow	3:10.71	LG Eintracht Frankfurt I Michael Pflüger; Niklas Zender; Clemens Höfer; Benjamin Jonas	3:10.72	SCC Berlin I Stefan Beyer; Sven Buggel; Robin Kresinszky; Julian Kiwus	3:12.39

=== Women ===
Event	Gold		Silver		Bronze	
100 m (Wind: −1.5 m/s)	Cathleen Tschirch	11.52	Leena Günther	11.62	Anne Möllinger	11.63
200 m (Wind: +0.2 m/s)	Christina Haack	23.45	Maike Dix	23.62	Leena Günther	23.64
400 m	Esther Cremer	52.70	Claudia Hoffmann	52.91	Lena Schmidt	53.30
800 m	Jana Hartmann	2:06.67	Annett Horna	2:06.86	Karoline Pilawa	2:06.91
1500 m	Corinna Harrer	4:10.47	Elina Sujew	4:16.21	Anne Kesselring	4:17.25
5000 m	Sabrina Mockenhaupt	15:36.89	Simret Restle	16:01.63	Lisa Hahner	16:30.40
5000 m walk	Sabine Krantz	20:56.75	Melanie Seeger	21:11.24	Christin Elß	23:35.98
100 m hurdles (Wind: −2.3 m/s)	Cindy Roleder	13.10	Anne-Kathrin Elbe	13.43	Nadine Hildebrand	13.49
400 m hurdles	Christiane Klopsch	56.97	Tina Kron	57.24	Claudia Wehrsen	57.36
3000 m steeplechase	Jana Sussmann	10:05.64	Verena Dreier	10:14.33	Friederike Feil	10:22.13
Triple jump	Katja Demut	14.22	Jenny Elbe	13.37	Katharina Schreck	13.09
Long jump	Michelle Weitzel	6.52	Bianca Kappler	6.48	Moguenara Sosthene Taroum	6.48
High jump	Melanie Bauschke	1.86	Marie-Laurence Jungfleisch	1.86	Meike Kröger	1.82
Pole vault	Martina Strutz	4.65	Silke Spiegelburg	4.60	Kristina Gadschiew	4.60
Shot put	Christina Schwanitz	18.95	Nadine Kleinert	18.57	Josephine Terlecki	17.31
Discus throw	Nadine Müller	63.41	Heike Koderisch	57.99	Ulrike Giesa	57.33
Hammer throw	Betty Heidler	76.04 CR	Kathrin Klaas	72.39	Andrea Bunjes	64.95
Javelin throw	Christina Obergföll	68.86 CR	Katharina Molitor	64.67 PB	Esther Eisenlauer	59.41
4 × 100 m relay	TSV Bayer 04 Leverkusen I Julia Brandt; Cathleen Tschirch; Mareike Peters; Jennifer Oeser	44.99	TV Wattenscheid 01 I Yasmin Kwadwo; Esther Cremer; Maike Dix; Christina Frewer	45.15	TV Gladbeck I Christina Haack; Annika Drazek; Friederike Möhlenkamp; Laura Mossakowski	45.31
4 × 400 m relay	TSV Bayer 04 Leverkusen I Julia Förster; Wiebke Ullmann; Annett Horna; Sorina Nwachukwu	3:38.25	LT DSHS Köln I Frederike Hogrebe; Claudia Wehrsen; Malena Richter; Lara Hoffmann	3:39.25	LG Olympia Dortmund I Carolin Strophff; Jana Hartmann; Monika Merl; Janina Balke	3:46.21
