= 2014 German Indoor Athletics Championships =

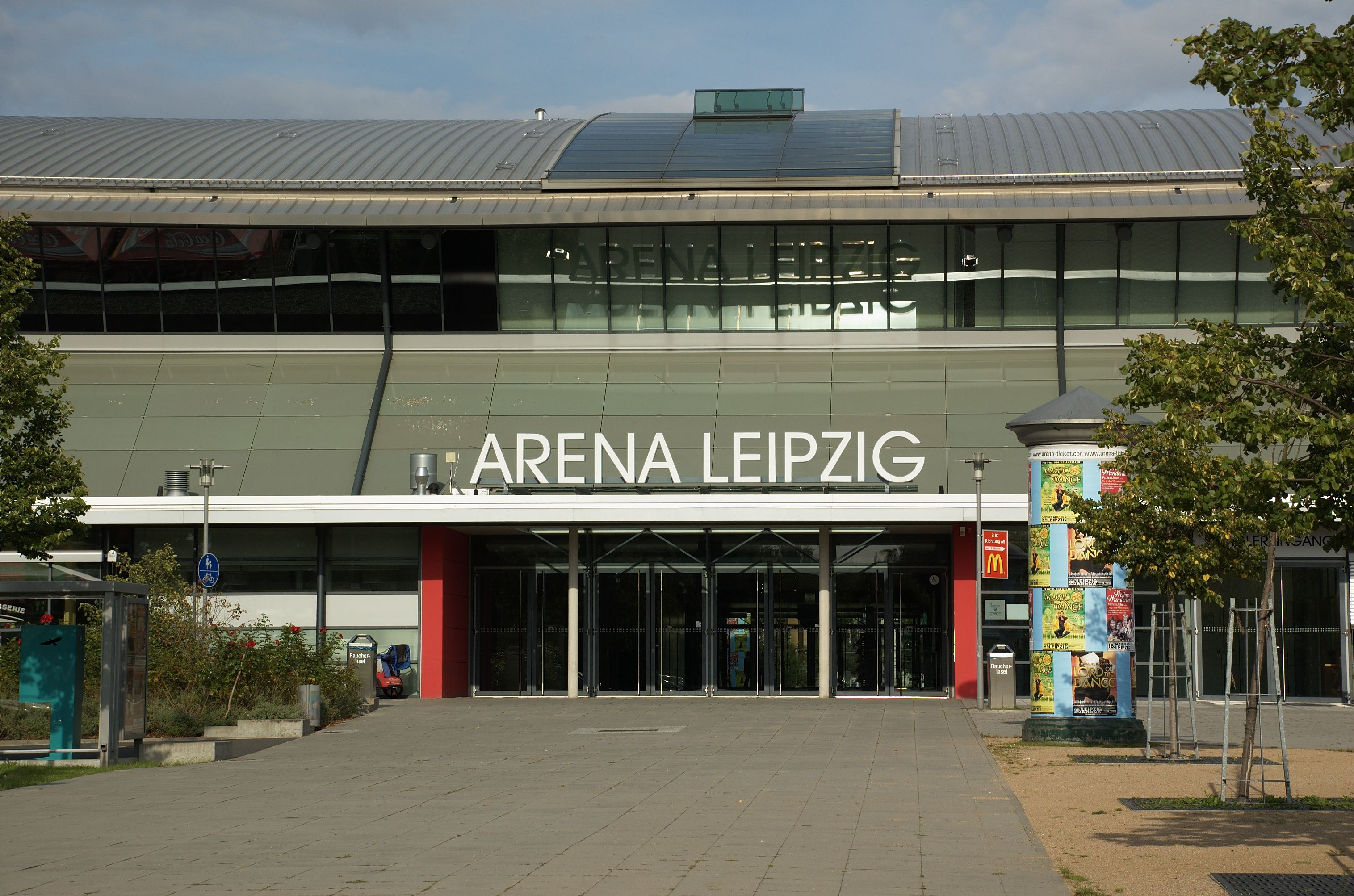
- The host stadium
- Edition: 61st
- Dates: 22–23 February
- Host city: Leipzig
- Venue: Arena Leipzig
- Events: 26+5

The 2014 German Indoor Athletics Championships (German: Deutsche Leichtathletik-Hallenmeisterschaften 2014) was the 61st edition of the national championship in indoor track and field for Germany. It was held on 22–23 February at the Arena Leipzig in Leipzig. A total of 26 events, 13 for men and 13 for women, were contested plus five further events were held separately. It was to serve as preparation for the 2014 IAAF World Indoor Championships. A sell-out crowd of 7,500 spectators attended the competition.

The combined events and racewalking national championships were held on 1–2 February at the Leichtathletikhalle Frankfurt-Kalbach in Kalbach-Riedberg. The 3 × 800 m and 3 × 1000 m relays were held on 16 February alongside the German Indoor Youth Athletics Championships in Sindelfingen.

== Results ==
=== Men ===
| Event | Gold | | Silver | | Bronze | |
|---|---|---|---|---|---|---|
| 60 metres | Christian Blum; TV Wattenscheid | 6.61 s | Lucas Jakubczyk; SC Charlottenburg | 6.61 s | Alex Schaf; VfB Stuttgart | 6.64 s |
| 200 metres | Robin Erewa; TV Wattenscheid | 20.56 s | Sebastian Ernst; TV Wattenscheid | 20.62 s | Aleixo-Platini Menga; TSV Bayer 04 Leverkusen | 20.99 s |
| 400 metres | Eric Krüger; SC Magdeburg | 46.92 s | Miguel Rigau; LT DSHS Köln | 46.98 s | Marco Kaiser; Dresdner SC | 47.52 s |
| 800 metres | Andreas Lange; LG Reinbek/Ohe | 1:51.85 min | Sören Ludolph; LG Braunschweig | 1:52.08 min | Patrick Zwicker; LC Rehlingen | 1:52.14 min |
| 1500 metres | Homiyu Tesfaye; LG Eintracht Frankfurt | 3:47.28 min | Florian Orth; LG Telis Finanz Regensburg | 3:47.82 min | Christoph Lohse; TV Wattenscheid | 3:48.02 min |
| 3000 metres | Homiyu Tesfaye; LG Eintracht Frankfurt | 7:58.09 min | Carsten Schlangen; LG Nord Berlin | 7:58.62 min | Marcel Fehr; LG Limes-Rems | 7:59.15 min |
| 5000 m walk | Nils Brembach; SC Potsdam | 19:48.65 min | Nils Gloger; SC Potsdam | 19:53.98 min | Marcel Lehmberg; SC Potsdam | 20:09.55 min |
| 60 m hurdles | Erik Balnuweit; LAZ Leipzig | 7.60 s | Gregor Traber; LAV Tübingen | 7.66 s | Helge Schwarzer; Hamburger SV | 7.78 s |
| 4 × 200 m relay | TV Wattenscheid; Julian Reus; Robin Erewa; Sebastian Ernst; Alexander Kosenkow | 1:23.51 min (NR) | SC Charlottenburg; Lucas Jakubczyk; Eric Franke; George Petzold; Maximilian Kessler | 1:24.27 min | LAZ Leipzig; Roy Schmidt; Martin Keller; Robert Hering; Erik Balnuweit | 1:25.60 min |
| 3 × 1000 m relay | TV Wattenscheid; Jonas Beverungen; Martin Bischoff; Christoph Lohse | 7:13.16 min | LC Rehlingen; Nils Klein; Philipp Stief; Patrick Zwicker | 7:15.77 min | StG Laufteam Erfurt-Worbis; Tim Stegemann; Rico Schwarz; Kevin Stadler | 7:16.86 min |
| High jump | Martin Günther; LG Eintracht Frankfurt | 2.28 m | Mateusz Przybylko; TSV Bayer 04 Leverkusen | 2.24 m | Raúl Spank; LG Nord Berlin | 2.20 m |
| Pole vault | Malte Mohr; TV Wattenscheid | 5.84 m | Florian Gaul; VfL Sindelfingen | 5.50 m | Hendrik Gruber; TSV Bayer 04 Leverkusen | 5.40 m |
| Long jump | Julian Howard; LG Region Karlsruhe | 7.98 m | Christian Reif; LC Rehlingen | 7.89 m | Marcel Kirstges; LG Rhein-Wied | 7.75 m |
| Triple jump | Andreas Pohle; ASV Erfurt | 16.42 m | Martin Seiler; ABC Ludwigshafen | 16.12 m | Martin Jasper; LC Rehlingen | 16.01 m |
| Shot put | David Storl; LAC Erdgas Chemnitz | 21.22 m | Tobias Dahm; VfL Sindelfingen | 19.18 m | Tobias Hepperle; VfB Stuttgart | 18.86 m |
| Heptathlon | Kai Kazmirek; LG Rhein-Wied | 6083 pts | Matthias Prey; SC Rönnau | 5734 pts | René Stauß; LAV Tübingen | 5711 pts |

=== Women ===
| Event | Gold | | Silver | | Bronze | |
|---|---|---|---|---|---|---|
| 60 metres | Verena Sailer; MTG Mannheim | 7.14 s | Yasmin Kwadwo; MTG Mannheim | 7.27 s | Tatjana Pinto; LG Brillux Münster | 7.28 s |
| 200 metres | Rebekka Haase; LV 90 Erzgebirge | 23.17 s | Maike Dix; TV Wattenscheid | 23.40 s | Nadine Gonska; MTG Mannheim | 23.74 s |
| 400 metres | Esther Cremer; TV Wattenscheid | 52.64 s | Lara Hoffmann; LT DSHS Köln | 53.37 s | Ruth Spelmeyer; VfL Oldenburg | 53.43 s |
| 800 metres | Fabienne Kohlmann; LG Karlstadt-Gambach-Lohr | 2:03.27 min | Christina Hering; LG Stadtwerke München | 2:03.30 min | Aline Krebs; ATSV Saarbrücken | 2:04.62 min |
| 1500 metres | Annett Horna; LC Rehlingen | 4:23.41 min | Denise Krebs; TV Wattenscheid | 4:24.17 min | Lena Klaassen; TSV Bayer 04 Leverkusen | 4:24.29 min |
| 3000 metres | Maren Kock; LG Telis Finanz Regensburg | 9:01.09 min | Elina Sujew; LT Haspa Marathon Hamburg) | 9:04.96 min | Corinna Harrer; LG Telis Finanz Regensburg | 9:06.99 min |
| 3000 m walk | Nicole Best; TV Groß-Gerau | 14:06.31 min | Bianca Schenker; LG Vogtland | 14:10.71 min | Brit Schröter; LG Vogtland | 14:30.87 min |
| 60 m hurdles | Nadine Hildebrand; VfL Sindelfingen | 7.92 s | Cindy Roleder; LAZ Leipzig | 7.95 s | Pamela Dutkiewicz; TV Wattenscheid | 8.19 s |
| 4 × 200 m relay | TV Wattenscheid; Maike Dix; Esther Cremer; Maral Feizbakhsh; Pamela Dutkiewicz | 1:34.67 min | LT DSHS; Leena Günther; Lena Schmidt; Lara Hoffmann; Linda Krevert | 1:34.96 min | TSV Bayer 04 Leverkusen; Kira Biesenbach; Anna Maiwald; Frederike Hogrebe; Julia Förster | 1:36.00 min |
| High jump | Marie-Laurence Jungfleisch; LAV Stadtwerke Tübingen | 1.92 m | Imke Onnen; LG Hannover | 1.80 m | Katarina Mögenburg; TSV Bayer 04 Leverkusen | 1.80 m |
| Pole vault | Silke Spiegelburg; TSV Bayer 04 Leverkusen | 4.61 m | Kristina Gadschiew; LAZ Zweibrücken | 4.61 m | Lisa Ryzih; ABC Ludwigshafen | 4.51 m |
| Long jump | Sosthene Moguenara; TV Wattenscheid | 6.49 m | Nadja Käther; Hamburger SV | 6.48 m | Lisa Steinkamp; LAV Tübingen | 6.45 m |
| Triple jump | Kristin Gierisch; LAC Erdgas Chemnitz | 14.03 m | Jenny Elbe; Dresdner SC | 13.83 m | Katja Demut; LC Jena | 13.66 m |
| Shot put | Christina Schwanitz; LV 90 Erzgebirge | 19.89 m | Josephine Terlecki; Hallesche LF | 17.50 m | Lena Urbaniak; LG Filstal | 16.97 m |
| Pentathlon | Kira Biesenbach; TSV Bayer 04 Leverkusen | 4.230 pts | Alina Biesenbach; TSV Bayer 04 Leverkusen | 4226 pts | Cindy Roleder; LAZ Leipzig | 4187 pts |
