= 2013 German Athletics Championships =

- Dates: 6–7 July 2013
- Host city: Ulm, Germany
- Venue: Donaustadion
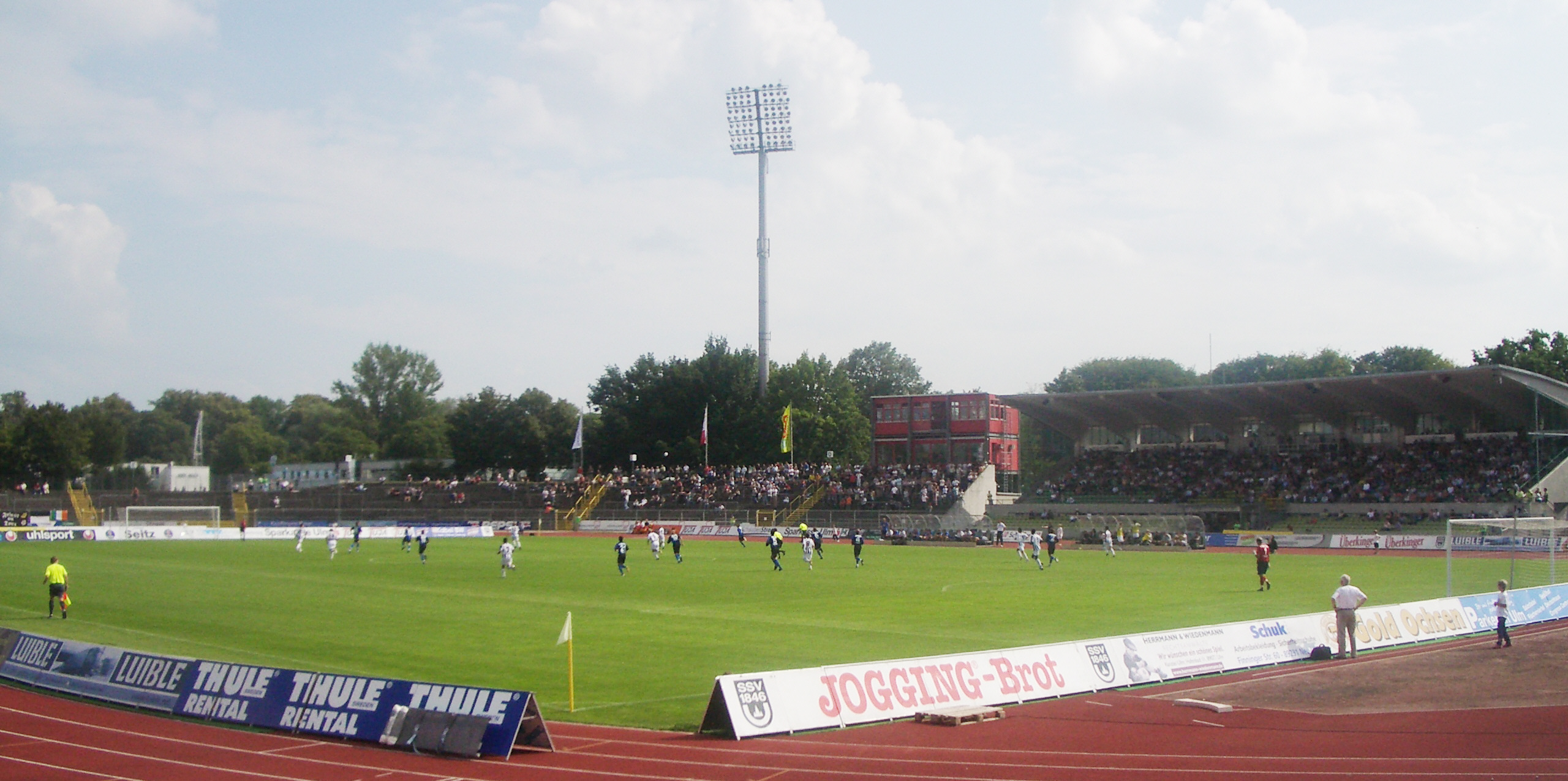

The 2013 German Athletics Championships were held at the Donaustadion in Ulm on 6–7 July 2013.

== Results ==
=== Men ===
	Gold		Silver		Bronze	
100 m (+0.6 m/s)	Julian Reus	10.14	Martin Keller	10.19	Sven Knipphals	10.27
200 m (−0.4 m/s)	Julian Reus	20.36	Sven Knipphals	20.73	Maximilian Kessler	20.79
400 m	David Gollnow	46.07	Jonas Plass	46.54	Miguel Rigau	46.55
800 m	Robin Schembera	1:47.05	Homiyu Tesfaye	1:47.29	Patrick Schoenball	1:48.80
1500 m	Carsten Schlangen	3:43.38	Sebastian Keiner	3:43.54	Florian Orth	3:44.37
5000 m	Arne Gabius	14:01.76	Philipp Pflieger	14:05.49	Simon Stützel	14:05.51
110 m hurdles (−1.2 m/s)	Matthias Bühler	13.49 =	Alexander John	13.49	Erik Balnuweit	13.58
400 m hurdles	Silvio Schirrmeister	49.24	Tobias Giehl	50.49	Quentin Seigel	50.80
3000 m steeplechase	Steffen Uliczka	8:40.62	Fabian Clarkson	8:48.25	Benedikt Karus	8:52.48
High jump	Matthias Haverney	2.22	Martin Günther	2.19	Mateusz Przyvylko	2.19
Pole vault	Björn Otto	5.80	Raphael Holzdeppe	5.75	Tobias Scherbarth	5.70
Triple jump	Andreas Pohle	16.35	Martin Seiler	15.86	Martin Jasper	15.60
Long jump	Alyn Camara	8.15	Sebastian Bayer	8.04	Christian Reif	7.90
Shot put	David Storl	21.04	Tobias Dahm	19.96	Ralf Bartels	19.84
Discus throw	Robert Harting	67.95	Martin Wierig	66.10	Christoph Harting	62.61
Hammer throw	Markus Esser	76.41	Johannes Bichler	70.18	Benjamin Boruschewski	69.40
Javelin throw	Thomas Röhler	83.56	Bernhard Seifert	81.59	Lars Hamann	81.24
4 × 100 m relay	LAZ Leipzig I Kevin Straßburger; Martin Keller; Roy Schmidt; Erik Balnuweit	39.08	TSV Bayer 04 Leverkusen I Niklas Rothes; Robin Erewa; Sebastian Ernst; Aleixo Platini Menga	39.41	StG Magdeburg-Halle I Felix Gehne; Eric Krüger; Matthias Lindner; Max Zöffzig	39.65
4 × 400 m relay	StG Magdeburg-Halle I Varg Thore Königsmark; Oliver Vogel; Eric Krüger; Thomas Schneider	3:07.23	LG Stadtwerke München I Jonas Plass; Kamghe Gaba; Benedikt Wiesend; David Gollnow	3:09.46	LT DSHS Köln I Jan Mössing; Stefan Schmeier; Tobias Lange; Miguel Rigau	3:12.00

=== Women ===
	Gold		Silver		Bronze	
100 m (−0.5 m/s)	Verena Sailer	11.09	Inna Weit	11.44	Yasmin Kwadwo	11.49
200 m (−1.0 m/s)	Inna Weit	23.16	Maike Dix	23.33	Nadine Gonska	23.78
400 m	Esther Cremer	51.93	Ruth Sophia Spelmeyer	52.63	Lena Schmidt	52.78
800 m	Fabienne Kohlmann	2:04.00	Kerstin Marxen	2:04.40	Denise Krebs	2:04.63
1500 m	Corinna Harrer	4:12.12	Annett Horna	4:13.24	Diana Sujew	4:13.36
5000 m	Sabrina Mockenhaupt	15:32.73	Maren Kock	16:14.15	Carolin Aehling	16:30.05
100 m hurdles (+0.9 m/s)	Nadine Hildebrand	12.90	Cindy Roleder	13.08	Franziska Hofmann	13.40
400 m hurdles	Claudia Wehrsen	57.78	Kim Carina Schmidt	58.82	Christina Kupprion	58.95
3000 m steeplechase	Antje Möldner-Schmidt	9:46.86	Maya Rehberg	10:06.19	Julia Hiller	10:13.92
High jump	Marie-Laurence Jungfleisch	1.92 m	Melanie Melfort	1.89 m	Julia Straub	1.82 m
Pole vault	Martina Strutz	4.65	Silke Spiegelburg	4.50	Anjuli Knäsche	4.45
Triple jump	Jenny Elbe	13.58	Kristin Gierisch	13.00	Maike Nieklauson	12.90
Long jump	Sosthene Moguenara	6.69	Melanie Bauschke	6.64 =	Lisa Steinkamp	6.52
Shot put	Christina Schwanitz	19.76	Josephine Terlecki	18.25	Lena Urbaniak	17.58
Discus throw	Nadine Müller	64.17	Anna Rüh	63.79	Shanice Craft	60.77
Hammer throw	Betty Heidler	73.93	Kathrin Klaas	69.98	Carolin Paesler	66.86
Javelin throw	Linda Stahl	63.70	Christina Obergföll	61.73	Katharina Molitor	60.68
4 × 100 m relay	MTG Mannheim I Deborah Hufschmidt; Yasmin Kwadwo; Nadine Gonska; Verena Sailer	44.10	TSV Bayer 04 Leverkusen I Anna Maiwald; Cathleen Tschirch; Mareike Peters; Kira Biesenbach	44.30	SCC Berlin I Svea Köhrbrück; Nadja Bahl; Carmen Maske; Laura Thomsen	45.11
4 × 400 m relay	TV Wattenscheid 01 I Maral Feizbakhsh; Christina Zweirner; Malena Richter; Esther Cremer	3:35.71	TSV Bayer 04 Leverkusen I Wiebke Ullmann; Julia Förster; Julia Schaefers; Sorina Nwachukwu	3:36.00	LG Stadtwerke München I Martha Sauter; Karoline Pilawa; Inga Maria Müller; Christina Hering	3:43.30
