= Tilgner =

Tilgner is a surname. Notable people with the surname include

== People ==
- Jonna Tilgner (born 1984), German athlete (de)
- Ulrich Tilgner (born 1948), German journalist (de)
- Viktor Oskar Tilgner (1844 –1896), Austrian sculptor

== Other uses ==
- 21650 Tilgner
