= Carolin Nytra =

German hurdler

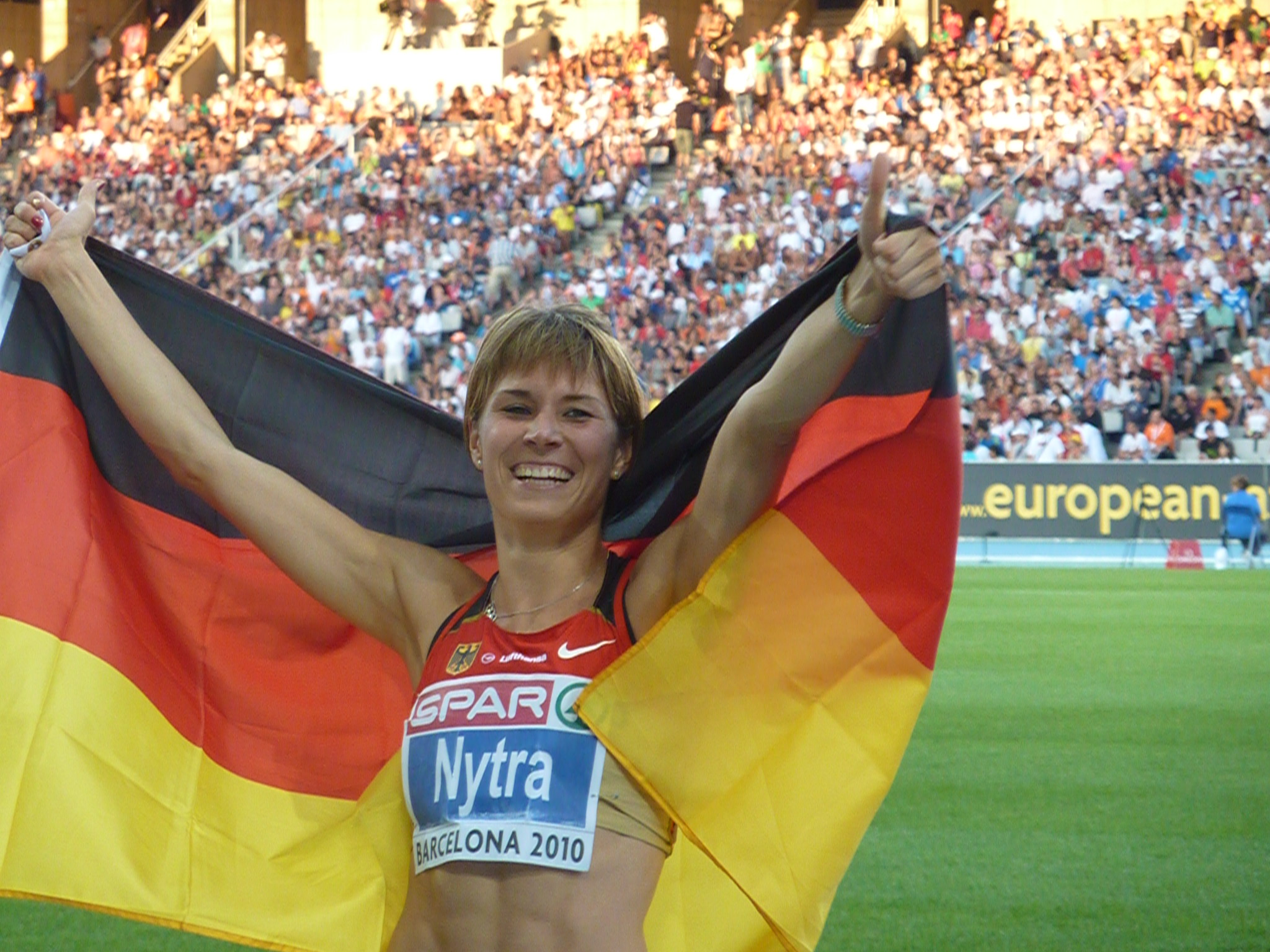
- Nytra in 2010

Personal information
- Born: 26 February 1985 (age 41) Hamburg, West Germany
- Height: 1.75 m (5 ft 9 in)
- Website: www.carolin-nytra.de

Sport
- Country: Germany
- Sport: Athletics
- Event: 100 metres hurdles

Achievements and titles
- Regional finals: 3rd at the 2010 European Athletics Championships
- National finals: 1st at the 2007, 2008, 2009, 2010 and 2012 German Athletics Championships
- Personal best(s): 100 m hurdles: 12.57 (July 2010)
Medal record
European Championships
Bronze medal – third place	2010 Barcelona	100 m hurdles
European Indoors
Gold medal – first place	2011 Paris	60 m hurdles

Carolin Nytra (born 26 February 1985 in Hamburg), also known as Carolin Dietrich, is a German athlete who specialises in the 100 metres hurdles. With a personal best time of 12.57 seconds, she became the seventh fastest German ever over this distance at the Diamond League meet in Lausanne on 8 July 2010.

== Career ==
Nytra represented Germany at the 2008 Summer Olympics and the 2009 World Championships in Athletics, at both events being eliminated at the semi-final stage. However, she did win a silver medal at the 2010 European Team Championships in Bergen, Norway, with a time of 12.81 seconds. She subsequently came first in the 2011 European Athletics Indoor Championships in Paris.

Nytra won the German Athletics Championships for four consecutive years, from 2007 until 2010, and then again in 2012. In 2012, she again competed in the Olympics.
