= 2009 World Championships in Athletics – Women's 4 × 100 metres relay =

The women's 4 × 100 metres relay at the 2009 World Championships in Athletics was held at the Olympic Stadium on August 21 and August 22.

== Medalists ==
Gold	Silver	Bronze
Jamaica; Simone Facey; Shelly-Ann Fraser; Aleen Bailey; Kerron Stewart	Bahamas; Sheniqua Ferguson; Chandra Sturrup; Christine Amertil; Debbie Ferguson-McKenzie	Germany; Marion Wagner; Anne Möllinger; Cathleen Tschirch; Verena Sailer

== Records ==
Prior to the competition, the following records were as follows.

World record	East Germany (GDR); Romy Müller, Sabine Günther, Ingrid Auerswald, Marlies Göhr	41.37	Canberra, Australia	6 October 1985
Championship record	United States (USA); Chryste Gaines, Marion Jones, Inger Miller, Gail Devers	41.47	Athens, Greece	9 August 1997
World Leading	United States (USA); Lauryn Williams, Allyson Felix, Muna Lee, Carmelita Jeter	41.58	Cottbus, Germany	8 August 2009
African Record	Nigeria (NGR); Christy Opara-Thompson, Beatrice Utondu, Faith Idehen, Mary Onyali-Omagbemi	42.39	Barcelona, Spain	7 August 1992
Asian Record	China (CHN); Li Xuemei, Xiao Lin, Li Yali, Liu Xiaomei	42.23	Shanghai, China	23 October 1997
North American Record	United States (USA); Chryste Gaines, Marion Jones, Inger Miller, Gail Devers	41.47	Athens, Greece	9 August 1997
South American record	Brazil (BRA); Luciana dos Santos, Lucimar de Moura, Katia Regina Santos, Rosemar Coelho Neto	42.97	Bogotá, Colombia	10 July 2004
European Record	East Germany (GDR); Romy Müller, Sabine Günther, Ingrid Auerswald, Marlies Göhr	41.37	Canberra, Australia	6 October 1985
Oceanian Record	Australia (AUS); Rachael Massey, Suzanne Broadrick, Jodi Lambert, Melinda Gainsford-Taylor	42.99	Pietersburg, South Africa	18 March 2000

No new world or championship record was set during this competition.

== Qualification standard ==
Standard
43.90

== Schedule ==
Date	Time	Round
August 22, 2009	18:10	Heats
August 22, 2009	20:00	Final

== Results ==
=== Heats ===
The first 2 of each heat (Q) plus the 2 fastest times (q) qualify.

Rank	Heat	Nation	Athletes	Time	Notes
1	1	Jamaica	Simone Facey, Shelly-Ann Fraser, Aleen Bailey, Kerron Stewart	41.88	Q, SB
2	1	Bahamas	Sheniqua Ferguson, Chandra Sturrup, Christine Amertil, Debbie Ferguson-McKenzie	42.66	Q, SB
3	2	Germany	Marion Wagner, Anne Möllinger, Cathleen Tschirch, Verena Sailer	42.96	Q, SB
4	3	Brazil	Rosemar Maria Neto, Lucimar Aparecida de Moura, Thaissa Presti, Vanda Gomes	43.07	Q, SB
5	3	Russia	Yevgeniya Polyakova, Aleksandra Fedoriva, Yuliya Gushchina, Natalia Rusakova	43.18	Q, SB
6	1	Trinidad and Tobago	Reyare Thomas, Kelly-Ann Baptiste, Ayanna Hutchinson, Semoy Hackett	43.22	q, NR
7	2	Colombia	Yomara Hinestroza, Felipa Palacios, Darlenis Obregón, Norma González	43.30	Q, SB
8	2	Great Britain & N.I.	Laura Turner, Montell Douglas, Emily Freeman, Emma Ania	43.34	q
9	3	Poland	Iwona Ziółkowska, Marta Jeschke, Dorota Jędrusińska, Iwona Brzezińska	43.63	
10	1	Ukraine	Olena Chebanu, Nataliya Pohrebnyak, Mariya Ryemyen, Hrystyna Stuy	43.77	
11	1	Saint Kitts and Nevis	Tanika Liburd, Meritzer Williams, Tameka Williams, Virgil Hodge	43.98	
12	1	Belgium	Olivia Borlée, Hanna Mariën, Élodie Ouédraogo, Anne Zagré	43.99	SB
13	2	Belarus	Anna Bagdanovich, Aksana Drahun, Alena Kievich, Yulia Nestsiarenka	44.12	SB
14	3	Japan	Chisato Fukushima, Momoko Takahashi, Mayumi Watanabe, Maki Wada	44.24	
15	2	Thailand	Sangwan Jaksunin, Orranut Klomdee, Jutamass Tawoncharoen, Jintara Seangdee	44.59	
16	2	Nigeria	Olutoyin Augustus, Halimat Ismaila, Seun Adigun, Oludamola Osayomi	46.54	
	3	United States	Lauryn Williams, Alexandria Anderson, Muna Lee, Carmelita Jeter	DNF	

Key: DNF = Did not finish, DNS = Did not start, NR = National record, Q = qualification by place in heat, q = qualification by overall place, SB = Seasonal best

=== Final ===
Rank	Nation	Athletes	Time	Notes
1st place, gold medalist(s)	Jamaica	Simone Facey, Shelly-Ann Fraser, Aleen Bailey, Kerron Stewart	42.06	
2nd place, silver medalist(s)	Bahamas	Sheniqua Ferguson, Chandra Sturrup, Christine Amertil, Debbie Ferguson-McKenzie	42.29	SB
3rd place, bronze medalist(s)	Germany	Marion Wagner, Anne Möllinger, Cathleen Tschirch, Verena Sailer	42.87	SB
4	Russia	Yevgeniya Polyakova, Aleksandra Fedoriva, Yuliya Gushchina, Yuliya Chermoshanskaya	43.00	SB
5	Brazil	Rosemar Maria Neto, Lucimar Aparecida de Moura, Thaissa Presti, Vanda Gomes	43.13	
6	Great Britain & N.I.	Laura Turner, Montell Douglas, Emily Freeman, Emma Ania	43.16	SB
7	Trinidad and Tobago	Reyare Thomas, Kelly-Ann Baptiste, Ayanna Hutchinson, Semoy Hackett	43.43	
8	Colombia	Yomara Hinestroza, Felipa Palacios, Darlenis Obregón, Norma González	43.71	

Key: SB = Seasonal best
