= Athletics at the 2007 Summer Universiade – Women's 400 metres hurdles =

The women's 400 metres hurdles event at the 2007 Summer Universiade was held on 11–13 August.

== Medalists ==
Gold	Silver	Bronze
Tatyana Azarova; Kazakhstan	Anastasiya Rabchenyuk; Ukraine	Jonna Tilgner; Germany

== Results ==
=== Heats ===
Qualification: First 2 of each heat (Q) and the next 2 fastest (q) qualified for the final.

Rank	Heat	Name	Nationality	Time	Notes
1	1	Tatyana Azarova	Kazakhstan	56.25	Q
2	3	Olga Adamovich	Russia	56.76	Q
3	3	Jonna Tilgner	Germany	56.98	Q
4	1	Yuliya Mulyukova	Russia	57.21	Q
5	2	Anastasiya Rabchenyuk	Ukraine	57.47	Q
6	2	Özge Gürler	Turkey	57.49	Q
7	1	Ilona Ranta	Finland	57.56	q
8	3	Dora Jemaa	France	57.81	q
9	3	Lamiae Lhabze	Morocco	57.90	PB
10	3	Patrícia Lopes	Portugal	57.98	
11	1	Lauren Boden	Australia	58.72	
12	2	Sayaka Aoki	Japan	58.80	
13	1	Laia Forcadell	Spain	58.93	
14	2	Lucy Jaramillo	Ecuador	59.67	
15	3	Sasa Nailopovlou	Greece	1:00.51	
16	2	Styliani Demogiou	Greece	1:01.91	
17	2	Joyce Balle Baako	Uganda	1:12.14	
	1	Martina Näf	Switzerland	DNF	
	1	Mame Fatou Faye	Senegal	DNS	

=== Final ===
Rank	Lane	Name	Nationality	Time	Notes
1st place, gold medalist(s)	5	Tatyana Azarova	Kazakhstan	55.52	
2nd place, silver medalist(s)	6	Anastasiya Rabchenyuk	Ukraine	55.98	
3rd place, bronze medalist(s)	4	Jonna Tilgner	Germany	56.27	SB
4	8	Ilona Ranta	Finland	56.48	PB
5	7	Yuliya Mulyukova	Russia	56.79	
6	2	Özge Gürler	Turkey	57.11	
7	3	Olga Adamovich	Russia	57.24	
8	1	Dora Jemaa	France	57.28	
