= Johanna Kedzierski =

German sprinter

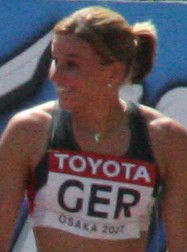
Johanna Kedzierski

Johanna Kedzierski (born 10 June 1984 in Wejherowo, Poland) is a German sprinter who specializes in the 200 metres.

At the 2007 World Championships in Athletics – Women's 4 × 100 metres relay she finished seventh together with teammates Katja Wakan, Cathleen Tschirch and Verena Sailer. She won a relay silver medal at the 2005 European Athletics Junior Championships.

Her personal best time over 200 metres is 23.47 seconds, set at the 2007 German Athletics Championships in Erfurt. She has 11.66 seconds in the 100 metres.
