= Sandra Möller =

German sprinter (born 1980)

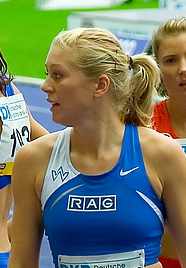

Personal information
- Nationality: German
- Born: 16 March 1980 (age 45)

Sport
- Country: Germany
- Sport: Athletics
- Event: 100 metres

Sandra Möller (born 16 March 1980) is a German sprinter who specializes in the 100 metres.

At the 2003 World Championships she finished fifth in the 4 × 100 metres relay, together with teammates Melanie Paschke, Marion Wagner and Katja Wakan.

Her personal best time on the individual distance is 11.59 seconds, achieved in August 2003 in Leverkusen. She has 23.24 seconds in the 200 metres.
