= Agata Strausa =

Latvian long-distance runner

Personal information
- Born: 2 December 1989 (age 36)

Sport
- Country: Latvia
- Sport: Long-distance running

Agata Strausa (born 2 December 1989) is a Latvian long-distance runner. In 2019, she competed in the senior women's race at the 2019 IAAF World Cross Country Championships held in Aarhus, Denmark. She finished in 105th place.

Strausa competed for the Florida Gators track and field team in the NCAA.
