= Katja Tengel =

German sprinter

Katja Tengel (born 27 June 1981 as Katja Wakan in Eisleben, Saxony-Anhalt) is a German sprinter who specializes in the 100 metres.

At the 2003 World Championships she finished seventh in the 4 × 100 m relay, together with teammates Melanie Paschke, Marion Wagner and Sandra Möller. At the 2007 World Championships she finished seventh in the relay, together with teammates Cathleen Tschirch, Johanna Kedzierski and Verena Sailer.

Her personal best time on the individual distance is 11.37 seconds, achieved in June 2006 in Regensburg. She has 23.94 seconds in the 200 metres.
