= Sebastian Schäfer =

German politician

Sebastian Schäfer (born 11 July 1979) is a German economist and politician of the Alliance 90/The Greens who has been serving as a member of the Bundestag since 2021.

== Early life and education ==
Schäfer was born 1979 in the West German town of Dettelbach. He studied philosophy at the University of Erfurt and Beloit College, and economics at the University of California, Berkeley.

== Early career ==
From 2018 to 2021, Schäfer worked at Baden-Württemberg's State Ministry of Finance. He was a 2021/22 Marshall Memorial Fellow of the German Marshall Fund.

== Political career ==
=== Career in state politics ===
In the negotiations to form a coalition government under the leadership of Minister-President of Baden-Württemberg Winfried Kretschmann following the 2021 state elections, Schäfer was part of the working group on the state budget, led by Edith Sitzmann and Stefanie Bürkle.

=== Member of the German Parliament, 2021–present ===
Schäfer was elected to the Bundestag in 2021.

In parliament, Schäfer has since been serving on the Budget Committee and the Finance Committee. On the Budget Committee, he serves as his parliamentary group’s rapporteur on the annual budget of the Federal Ministry of Defence. In 2022, he also joined the parliamentary body charged with overseeing a 100 billion euro special fund to strengthen Germany's armed forces. Since 2025, he has been a member of the so-called Confidential Committee (Vertrauensgremium) of the Budget Committee, which provides budgetary supervision for Germany's three intelligence services, BND, BfV and MAD.

In the negotiations to form a coalition government under the leadership of Cem Özdemir following the 2026 state elections in Baden-Württemberg, Schäfer was part of his party's delegation in the working group on public finances, co-chaired by Danyal Bayaz and Albrecht Schütte.

== Other activities ==
- Nuclear Waste Disposal Fund (KENFO), Member of the Board of Trustees (since 2022)
