= Nadja Käther =

German long jumper

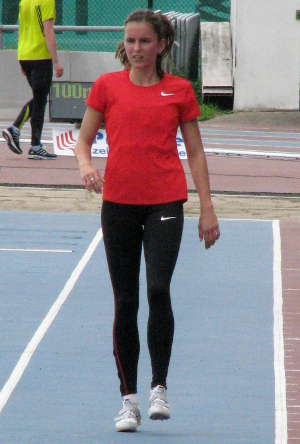
- Käther in 2011

Personal information
- Nationality: German
- Born: 29 September 1988 (age 37) Hamburg, Germany

Sport
- Country: Germany
- Sport: Track and field
- Event: Long jump

Nadja Käther (born 29 September 1988) is a German athlete who specialises in the long jump. She competed at the 2010 European Championships and 2016 European Championships.

== Personal bests ==
=== Outdoor ===
Event	Record	Wind	Venue	Date
Long jump	6.66 m	+2.0	Wesel	30 May 2010
Triple jump	13.56 m	+0.1	Hamburg	12 July 2014

=== Indoor ===
Event	Record	Venue	Date
Long jump	6.68 m	Hamburg	26 January 2014
Triple jump	13.50 m	Hamburg	25 January 2014
