= Filmon Ghirmai =

German distance runner

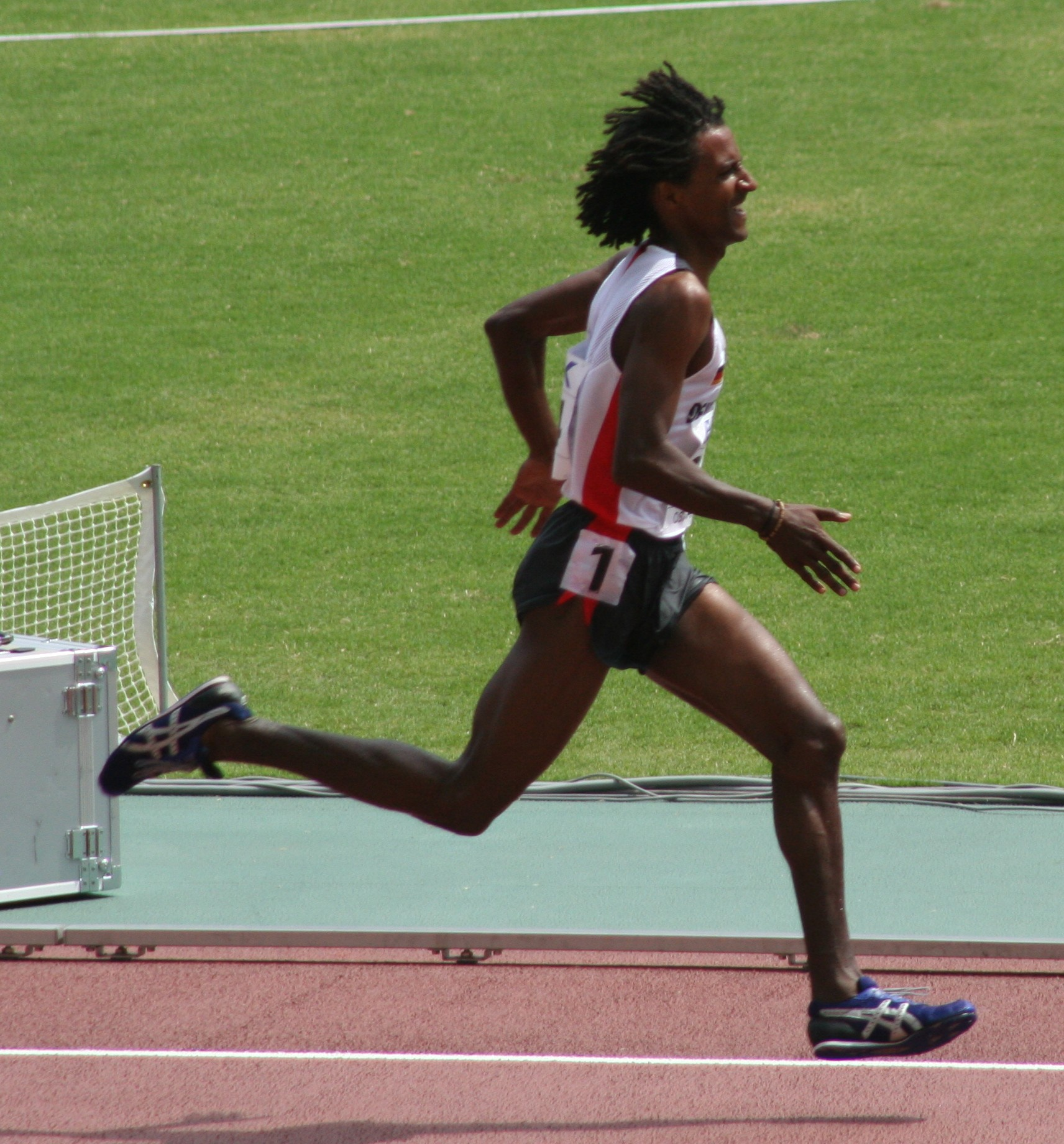
Ghirmai at the 2007 World Championships

Filmon Ghirmai (born 25 January 1979) is a German runner who specialized in the 3000 metres steeplechase.

He was born in the Ethiopian Province of Eritrea and came to Stuttgart, Germany, at the age of six as a refugee from the Eritrean War of Independence.

Before specializing in middle distance running, he played association football for VfB Stuttgart. Filmon also studied business economics at the renowned University of Tübingen.

He finished twelfth at the 1998 World Junior Championships and seventh at the 2002 IAAF World Cup. He also competed at the 2002 European Championships and the 2003 World Championships without reaching the finals.

His personal best time is 8:20.50 minutes, achieved in June 2003 in Luzern.

Filmon became German steeplechase champion in 2002, 2004 and 2005. In 2009, he became German 10000 m champion. He has competed for the sports clubs LAC Pliezhausen (1993-2002) and LAV Tübingen (2003–present).

Filmon's coach is the 1992 Olympic Champion over 5000 m, Dieter Baumann.
