= Maral Feizbakhsh =

German sprinter

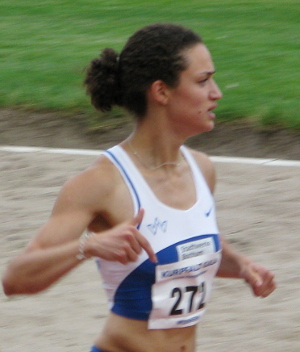
Maral Feizbakhsh in 2012

Maral Feizbakhsh (born 22 September 1990 in Tehran, Iran) is a German sprinter. She competed in the 4 × 400 m relay event at the 2012 Summer Olympics.
