= Antje Möldner-Schmidt =

German middle-distance runner

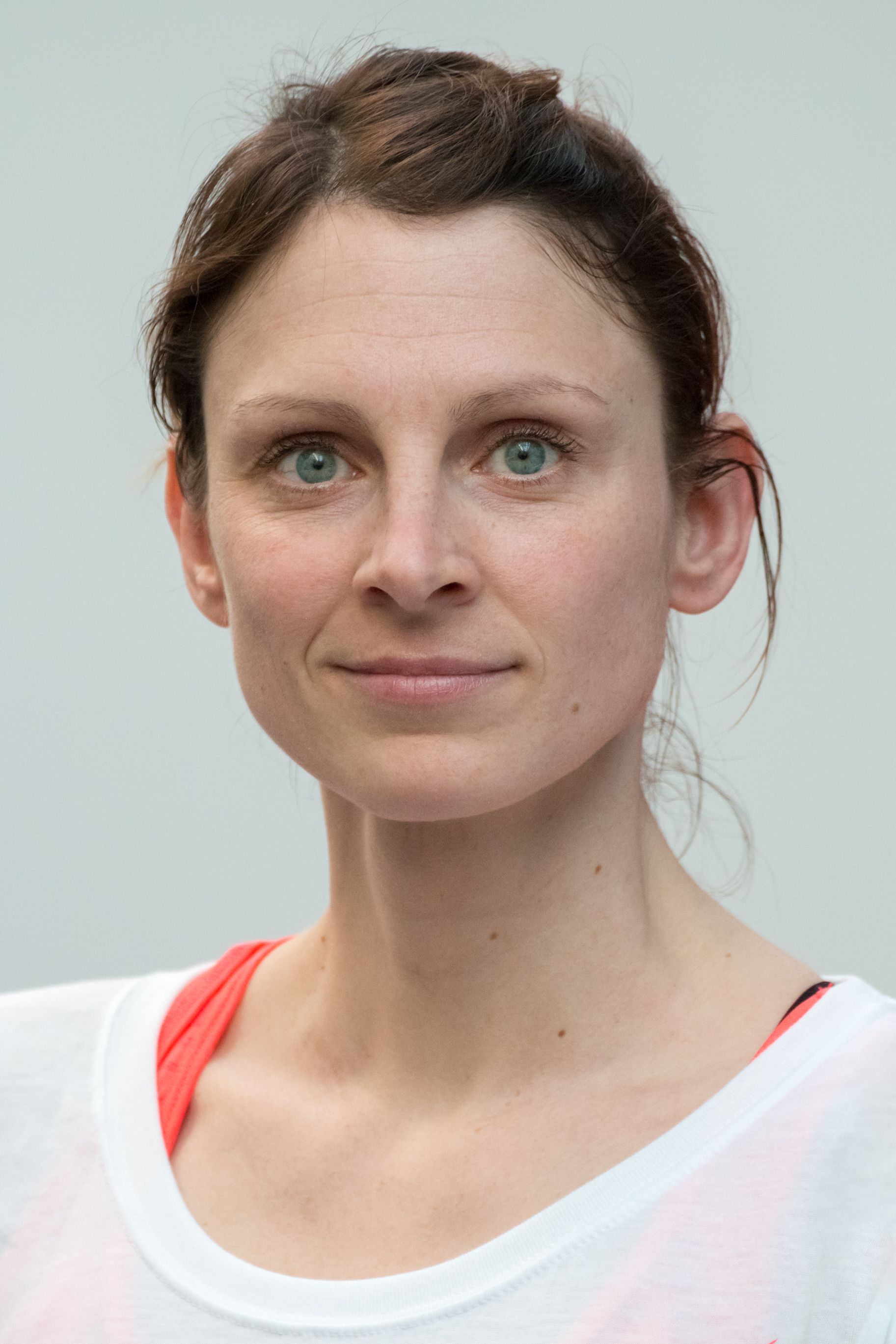
- Möldner-Schmidt in 2015

Personal information
- Nationality: German
- Born: 13 June 1984 (age 42) Potsdam-Babelsberg, East Germany

Sport
- Sport: Steeplechase
Medal record
Women's athletics
Representing Germany
European Athletics Championships
| Gold medal – first place | 2014 Zürich | 3000 m steeplechase |
| Silver medal – second place | 2012 Helsinki | 3000 m steeplechase |
European Team Championships
| Gold medal – first place | 2009 Leiria | 3000 m steeplechase |
European Athletics U23 Championships
| Bronze medal – third place | 2005 Erfurt | 1500 metres |

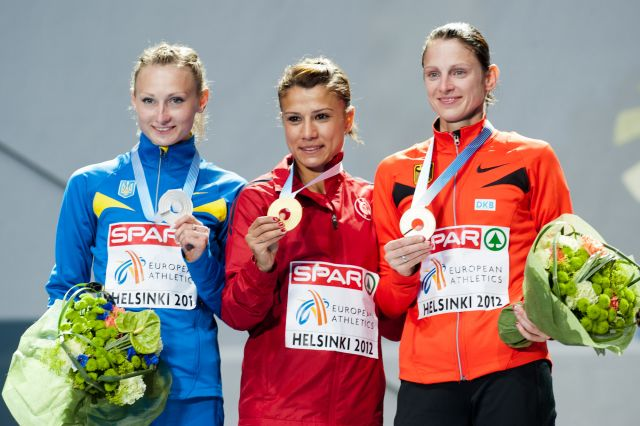
Möldner-Schmidt (right) at the podium in Helsinki 2012

Antje Möldner-Schmidt (born 13 June 1984) is a retired German track and field athlete who specialised in middle distance running and the 3000 metres steeplechase.

== Biography ==
Born in Potsdam-Babelsberg, Germany, she began training in athletics with her twin, Berit, but her sister quit the sport as a result of an injury. Möldner began her career as a 1500 metres runner and first competed internationally at the 2001 World Youth Championships and 2002 World Junior Championships. She broke into the European professional ranks in 2005: a personal best of 4:10.83 brought her sixth place at the 2005 European Athletics Indoor Championships. She improved further outdoors, recording 4:08.81 in Dessau, a time which made her the top ranked 1500 m German athlete that year. She also won the German national championships, both indoor and outdoors, and took the bronze at the 2005 European Athletics U23 Championships.

The highlights of the following two seasons were a 1500 m indoor national title, two sixth-place finishes in the 2006 and 2007 European Cup, and an outdoor national title in 2007. Both years, she was the top ranked German athlete in her event.

Möldner decided upon a change of event in 2008, choosing to test her abilities in the 3000 m steeplechase. She won the German outdoor championships and achieved the Olympic qualifying time. She went on to represent Germany at the 2008 Summer Olympics and, although she did not pass the heats stage, her time of 9:29.86 was a German record. A month after, she won the bronze medal in the event at the 2008 DecaNation competition. The following year, her switch to the steeplechase began to produce results. She won her first continental gold medal at the 2009 European Team Championships with a time of 9:32.65. A win at the national championships meant she was selected for the German squad for the 2009 World Championships in Athletics. She reached the 3000 m steeplechase final, taking ninth place with 9:18.54 – improving her national record by a large margin.

She was ruled out for the whole of the 2010 season after tests revealed that she had a lymphoid cell disorder. She had to undergo treatments and was removed from competing on her doctors' orders. She took part at the European Championship in Helsinki, and finished 7th in the Olympics in 2012. By 2014, she won the European Championship

== Personal bests ==
| Track | Event | Time (min) | Venue | Date |
|---|---|---|---|---|
| Outdoor | 1500 m | 4:08.81 | Dessau, Germany | 27 May 2005 |
| Outdoor | 3000 m | 9:00.74 | Potsdam, Germany | 27 April 2005 |
| Outdoor | 2000 m steeplechase | 6:15.90 | Pliezhausen, Germany | 17 May 2009 |
| Outdoor | 3000 m steeplechase | 9:18.54 | Berlin, Germany | 17 August 2009 |
| Indoor | 1500 m | 4:10.83 | Madrid, Spain | 5 March 2005 |
| Indoor | 2000 m | 5:47.66 | Leipzig, Germany | 12 February 2006 |
| Indoor | 3000 m | 9:01.07 | Liévin, France | 5 March 2006 |

- All information taken from IAAF profile.
