= Anne Cibis =

German sprinter

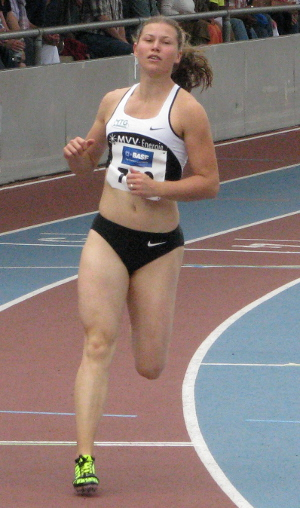
- Möllinger at Mannheim DLV Competition 2011

Medal record

Women's athletics

Representing Germany

World Championships
Bronze medal – third place	2009 Berlin	4 × 100 m relay

European Athletics Championships
Gold medal – first place	2012 Helsinki	4 × 100 m relay

European U23 Championships
Silver medal – second place	2005 Erfurt	4 × 100 m relay

Anne Cibis (née Möllinger; born 27 September 1985 in Worms) is a track and field sprint athlete who competes internationally for Germany.

Cibis represented Germany at the 2008 Summer Olympics in Beijing. She competed at the 4 × 100 metres relay together with Verena Sailer, Cathleen Tschirch and Marion Wagner. In their first round heat they placed third behind Jamaica and Russia and in front of China. Their time of 43.59 seconds was the eighth time overall out of sixteen participating nations. With this result they qualified for the final in which they sprinted to a time of 43.28 seconds for fifth place.

She again appeared in the German 4 × 100 m team at the 2012 Summer Olympics. She and teammates Leena Günther, Tatjana Pinto and Verena Sailer reached the final and again finished fifth, with a time of 42.67.
