= Marco Schmidt =

German shot putter

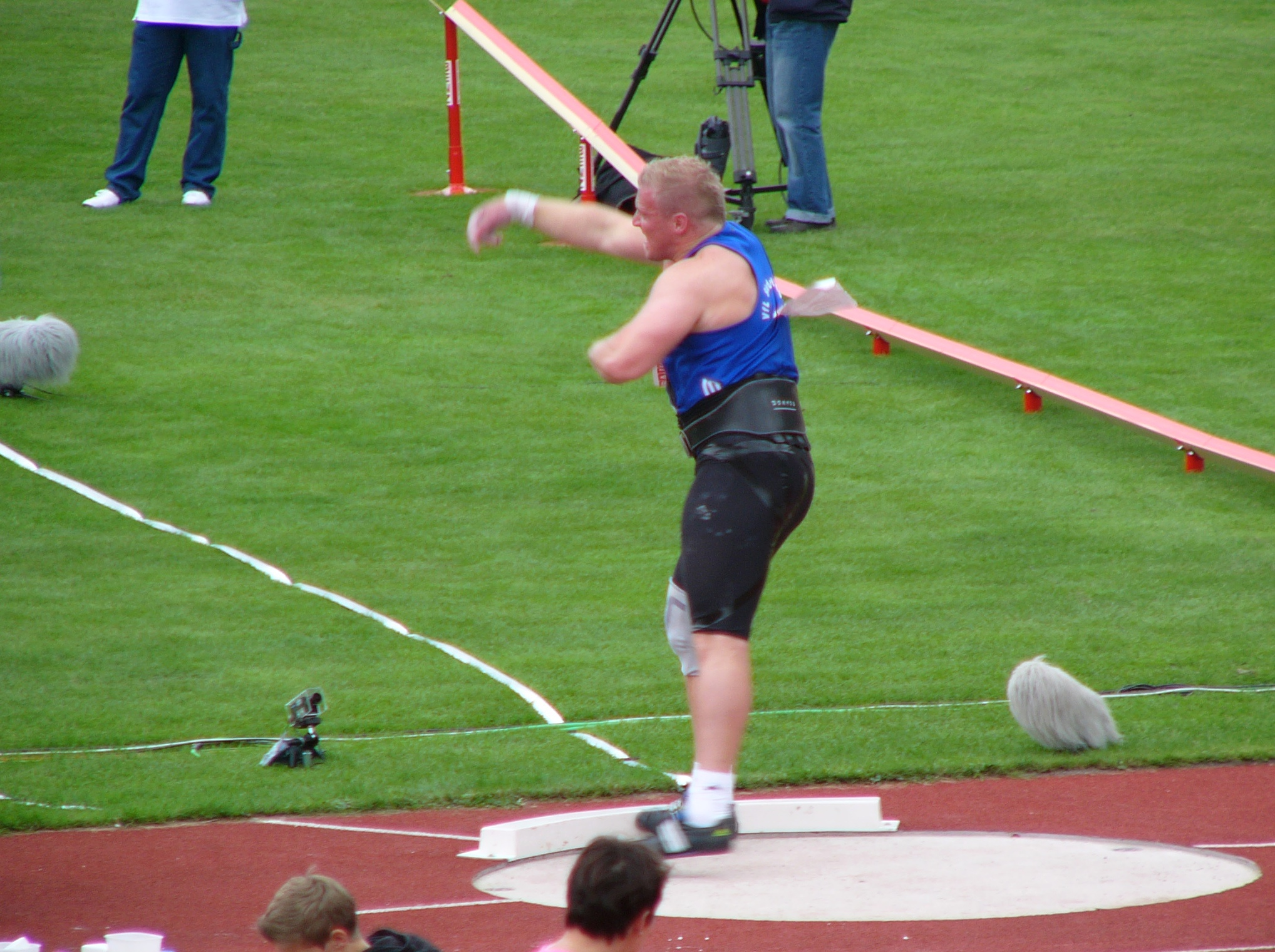
Marco Schmidt at the 2011 German Athletics Championships in Kassel

Marco Schmidt (born 5 September 1983) is a German former shot putter.

== Competition record ==
Year	Competition	Venue	Position	Notes
Representing Germany
2009	European Indoor Championships	Turin, Italy	12th (q)	19.38 m
2011	European Indoor Championships	Paris, France	5th	20.29 m
2011	World Championships	Daegu, South Korea	13th (q)	20.06 m
2012	European Championships	Helsinki, Finland	7th	19.63 m
2013	European Indoor Championships	Gothenburg, Sweden	7th	19.63 m
