= Jonna Tilgner =

German sprinter and hurdler

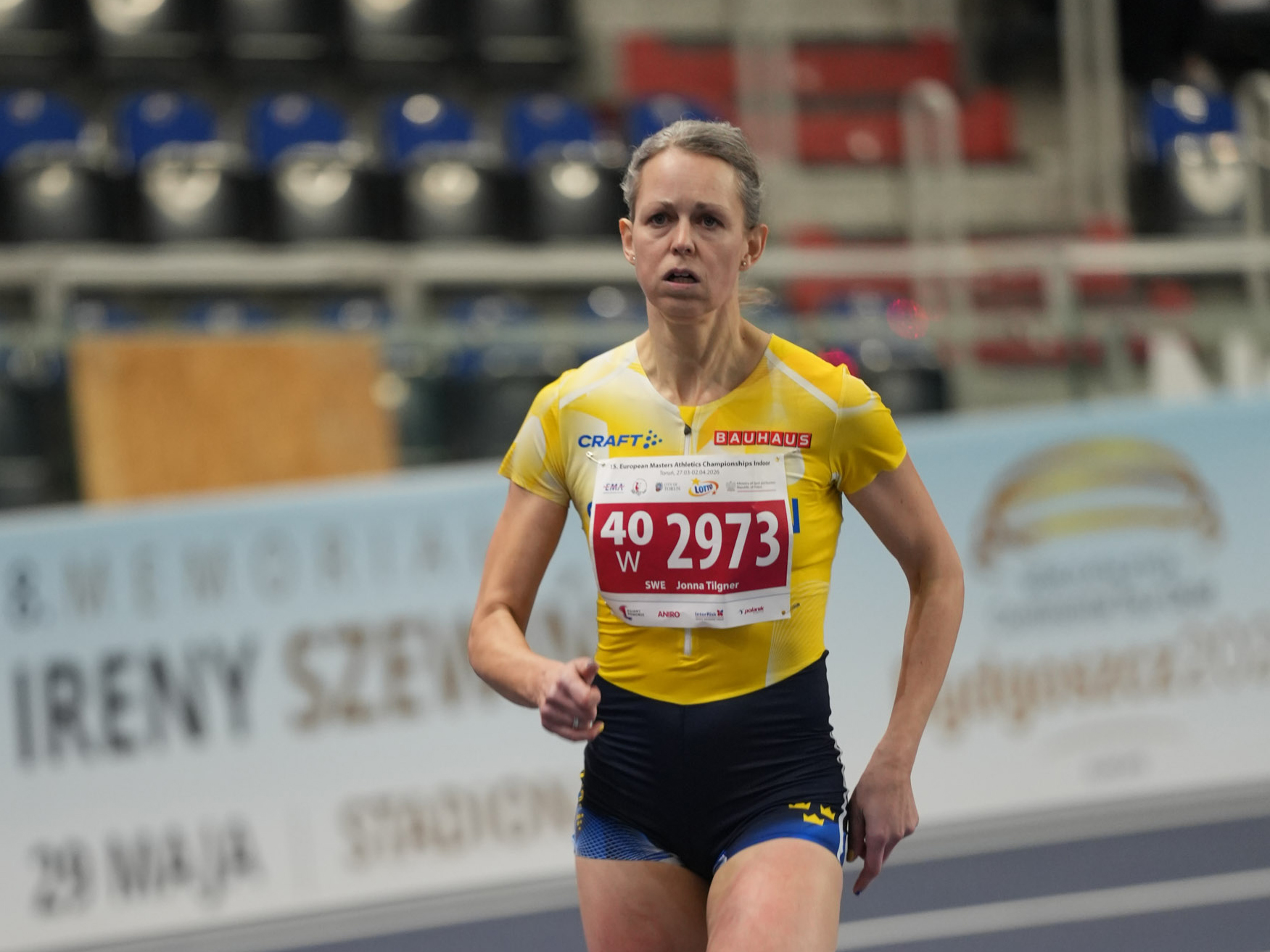
- Jonna Tilgner (2026)

Personal information
- Full name: Jonna Valesca Tilgner
- Nationality: Germany
- Born: 18 November 1984 (age 41) Hannover, Lower Saxony, West Germany
- Height: 1.69 m (5 ft 6 1/2 in)
- Weight: 55 kg (121 lb)

Sport
- Sport: Athletics
- Event: 4 × 400 metres relay
- Club: Bremer Leichtathletik Team
- Coached by: Jens Ellrott

Achievements and titles
- Personal best(s): 400 m: 51.90 s (2008); 400 m hurdles: 55.71 (2009)
Medal record
Women's athletics
Representing Germany
Universiade
Silver medal – second place	2009 Belgrade	400 m hurdles
Bronze medal – third place	2007 Bangkok	400 m hurdles

Jonna Valesca Tilgner (born November 18, 1984, in Hannover, Lower Saxony) is a German sprinter and hurdler, who specialized in the 400 metres. She won two medals, silver and bronze, in the women's 400 m hurdles at the 2007 Summer Universiade in Bangkok, Thailand, and at the 2009 Summer Universiade in Belgrade, Serbia, clocking at 56.27 and 56.02 seconds, respectively. Tilgner is also a member of Bremer Leichtathletik Team, and is coached and trained by Jens Ellrott.

Tilgner competed for the women's 4 × 400 m relay at the 2008 Summer Olympics in Beijing, along with her teammates Claudia Hoffmann, Florence Ekpo-Umoh, and Sorina Nwachukwu. Running the start-off leg, Tilgner recorded her individual-split time of 53.12 seconds, and the German team went on to an eighth-place finish in the final, for a total time of 3:28.45.
