= Annett Horna =

German athletics competitor

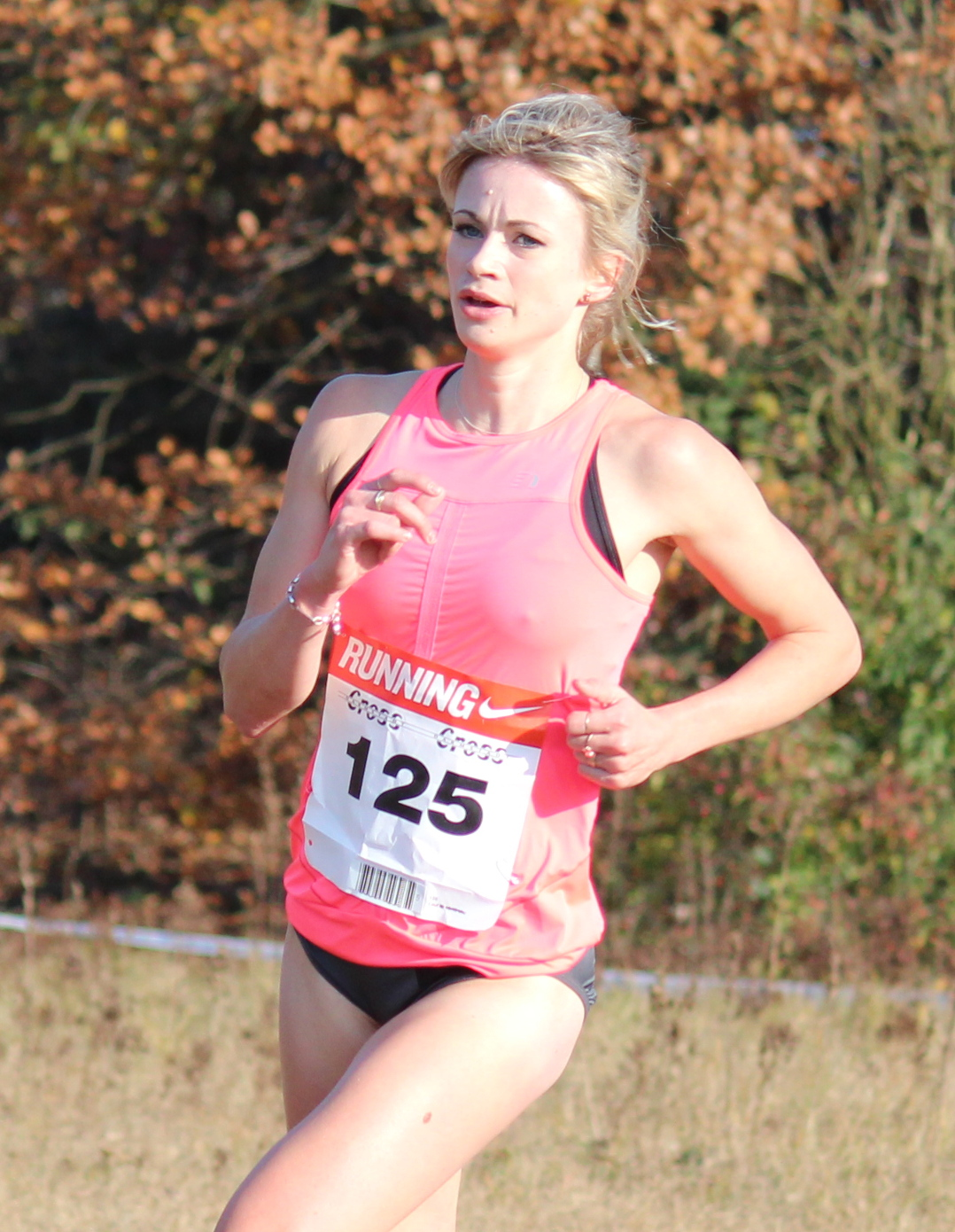
Annett Horna

Annett Horna (born February 4, 1987, in Magdeburg, East Germany) is a German athlete who is best known as an 800 meter and 1500 meter runner for SV Halle.

== Life ==
Her first success in the senior women division was her victory in the 2008 German Championships in the 4 × 400 m relay with the relay team of TSV Bayer Leverkusen (Caroline Dieckhöner, Maren Schott, Annett Horna, Sorina Nwachukwu; 3:40.94 min). The team was able to defend their title in 2009, 2010 and 2011. In 2008 and 2012, Horna won the German Championship with her club's 3 × 800 m relay team.

At the 2005 European Athletics Junior Championships in Kaunas (Lithuania) Horna finished in 8th place of the 800 m race. She was eliminated in the semi-final of the 2006 World Junior Championships in Athletics in Beijing, and in the first heat of the 2009 European Athletics Junior Championships in Kaunas, both times over the 800 m distance. In 2009 she won her first individual national title during the German Indoor Athletics Championships. She won the silver medal at the 2009 and 2010 German Athletics Championships. In 2013 Horna won the title over the 1500 m distance at the German Indoor Athletics Championships, and she defended her title in 2014.

Since 2015, Horna has focused on long-distance running. At her debut over the half marathon distance, she won the bronze medal during the 2015 German Half Marathon Championships. She currently lives in Leipzig and starts for SV Halle since 2016.

== Personal bests ==
- 400 meters: 55.66 s (2010)
- 800 meters: 2:02.29 min (2011)
- 1000 meters: 2:39.80 min (2012)
- 1500 meters: 4:10.98 min (2013)
- 3000 meters: 9:24.74 min (2014)
- 3000 meters steeplechase: 10:46.03 min (2015)
- 10,000 meters: 35:04.65 (2015)
- 10 km: 34:00 (2013)
- 15 km: 56:01 (2015)
- Half marathon: 1:15:47 (2015)
