= Andrea Bunjes =

German hammer thrower

Andrea Bunjes (born 5 February 1976 in Holtland, Lower Saxony) is a German hammer thrower. She is a member of the Eintracht Frankfurt athletes team. Her personal best throw is 70.73 metres, achieved during the qualification round at the 2004 Olympics. This ranks her fourth among German hammer throwers, behind Betty Heidler, Susanne Keil and Kathrin Klaas. She is a one-time national champion in the women's hammer throw (2004).

== Achievements ==
Year	Competition	Venue	Position	Notes
Representing Germany
2002	European Championships	Munich, Germany	11th	64.92 m
2003	World Championships	Paris, France	—	NM
2004	Olympic Games	Athens, Greece	11th	68.40 m
2009	World Championships	Berlin, Germany	24th	67.01 m
