= Raúl Spank =

German high jumper

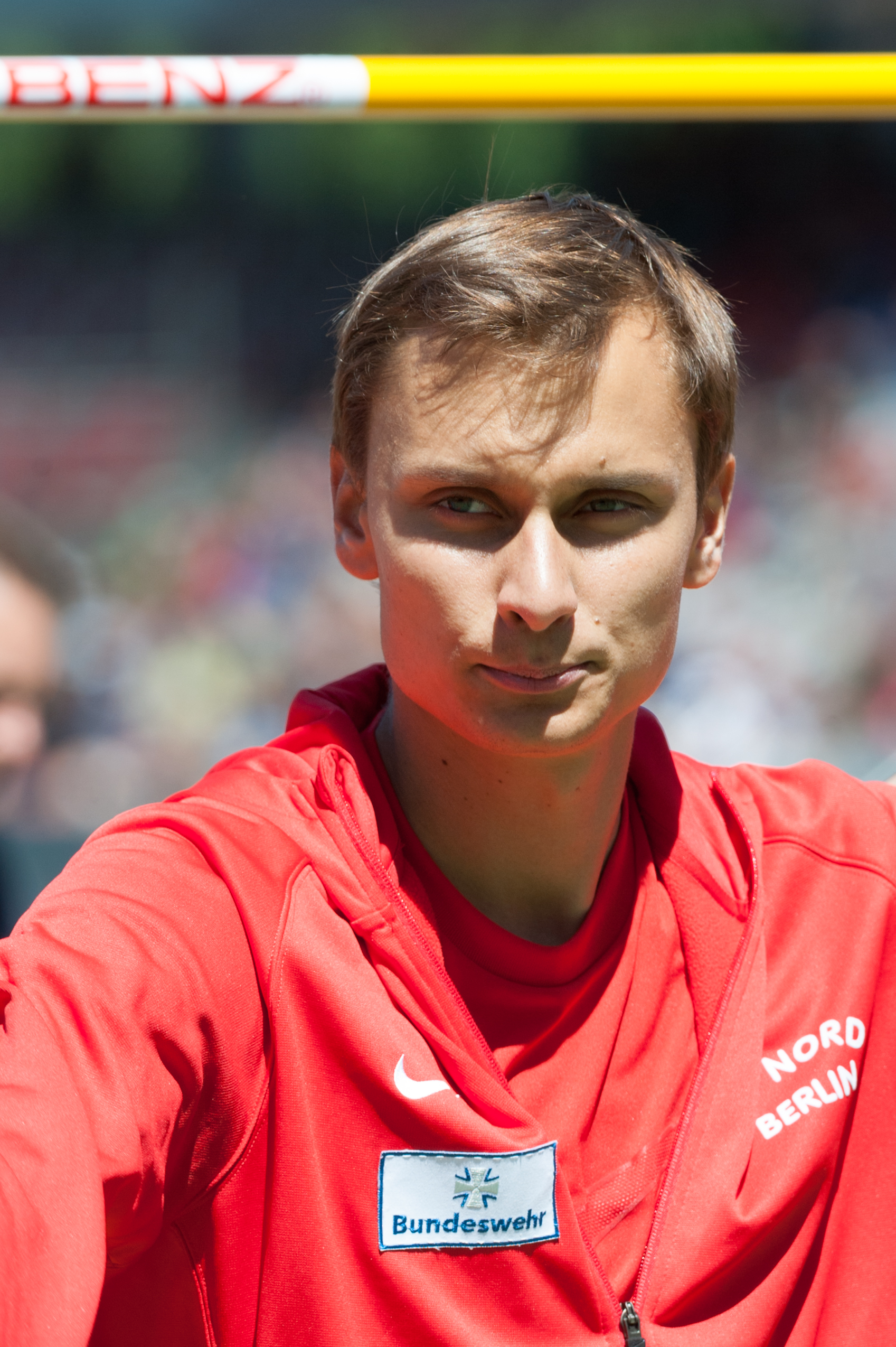
- Raúl Spank in 2015

Medal record

Men's athletics

Representing Germany

World Championships
Bronze medal – third place	2009 Berlin	High jump

Raúl Roland Spank (born 13 July 1988, in Dresden) is a retired German athlete who specialised in the high jump.

He competed on the world stage for the first time at the 2005 World Youth Championships in Athletics in Marrakesh. He finished seventh in the final, jumping a personal best of 2.11 metres. The following year he moved up to the junior level, taking part in the 2006 World Junior Championships. He finished the tournament in Beijing with another personal best of 2.23 m, ending up in fifth place. In February 2008 he improved his indoor best to 2.26 m and further improvement came outdoors later that year at his first Olympic Games. Representing Germany at the 2008 Beijing Olympics, he finished in fifth place with a personal best of 2.32 m, just two centimetres away from a medal position.

After winning the 2009 indoor national championships, Spank competed for Germany at continental level for the first time, forming part of the team at the 2009 European Athletics Indoor Championships. Although he had equalled his new indoor best of 2.30 m in the qualifying rounds, he only managed 2.25 m in the final of the competition, resulting in a seventh-place finish. He went to the first European Team Championships in Leiria, Portugal in June but he finished in tenth with a sub-par jump of 2.15 m.

At the World Championships in Berlin he won the bronze medal with personal best-equalling jump of 2.32 m. He improved his best shortly afterwards, winning the Internationales Hochsprung-Meeting Eberstadt meeting with 2.33 m. He won at the 2010 German Athletics Championships, but did not make the team for the 2010 European Athletics Championships as he had not achieved the standard set by the German Athletics Federation. He jumped 2.30 m at the Eberstadt meeting and took his second consecutive victory.

During his career Spank was coached by Erika Falz and Jörg Elbe and was a member of Dresdner SC 1898's athletics team. He officially retired at the end of the 2016 season.

== Statistics ==
=== Personal bests ===
Event	Best (m)	Venue	Date
High jump (outdoor)	2.33	Eberstadt, Germany	23 August 2009
High jump (indoor)	2.31	Arnstadt, Germany	19 February 2011

- All information taken from IAAF profile.

=== Major competition record ===
Year	Competition	Venue	Position	Notes
2005	World Youth Championships	Marrakesh, Morocco	7th	2.11 m
2006	World Junior Championships	Beijing, China	5th	2.23 m
2007	European Junior Championships	Hengelo, Netherlands	3rd	2.21 m
2008	Olympic Games	Beijing, China	5th	2.32 m
2009	European Indoor Championships	Turin, Italy	7th	2.25 m
2009	European Team Championships	Leiria, Portugal	10th	
2009	World Championships	Berlin, Germany	3rd	2.32 m
2011	European Indoor Championships	Paris, France	8th	2.20 m
2011	European Team Championships	Stockholm, Sweden	3rd	2.28 m
2011	World Championships	Daegu, South Korea	9th	2.29 m
2012	World Indoor Championships	Istanbul, Turkey	9th	2.28 m
