= Sören Ludolph =

German middle-distance runner

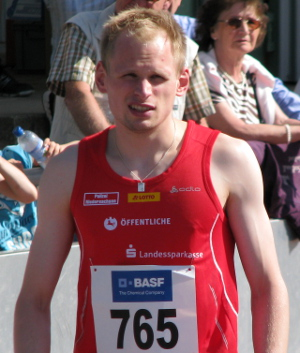
- Ludolph in 2012

Personal information
- Full name: Sören Ludolph
- Born: 25 February 1988 (age 38) Lüneburg, West Germany
- Height: 1.82 m (6 ft 0 in)

Sport
- Country: Germany
- Sport: Athletics
- Event: 800 metres

Achievements and titles
- Personal bests: 800 metres: 1:46.69 (Ulm; July 2009)

Sören Ludolph (born 25 February 1988 in Lüneburg) is a German middle-distance runner. At the 2012 Summer Olympics, he competed in the 800 metres, finishing seventh in his first round heat.
