= Sorina Nwachukwu =

German sprinter (born 1987)

Personal information
- Nationality: Germany
- Born: 21 August 1987 (age 38) Witten, North Rhine- Westphalia, West Germany
- Height: 1.75 m (5 ft 9 in)
- Weight: 64 kg (141 lb)

Sport
- Sport: Athletics
- Event: 4 × 400 metres relay
- Club: TSV Bayer 04 Leverkusen
- Coached by: Joachim Schwarzmüller

Achievements and titles
- Personal best: 400 m: 51.53 s (2008)

Sorina Nwachukwu (born August 21, 1987 in Witten, North Rhine-Westphalia) is a German sprinter of Nigerian descent, who specialized in the 400 metres. She set her personal best time of 51.53 seconds, by winning the same distance at the 2009 German National Athletics Championships in Ulm. Nwachukwu is also a member of the track and field team for TSV Bayer 04 Leverkusen, and is coached and trained by Joachim Schwarzmüller.

Nwachukwu competed for the women's 4 × 400 m relay at the 2008 Summer Olympics in Beijing, along with her teammates Claudia Hoffmann, Florence Ekpo-Umoh, and Jonna Tilgner. Running the second leg, Nwachukwu recorded her individual-split time of 52.60 seconds, and the German team went on to an eighth-place finish in the final, for a total time of 3:28.45.
