= Cathleen Tschirch =

German sprinter (born 1979)

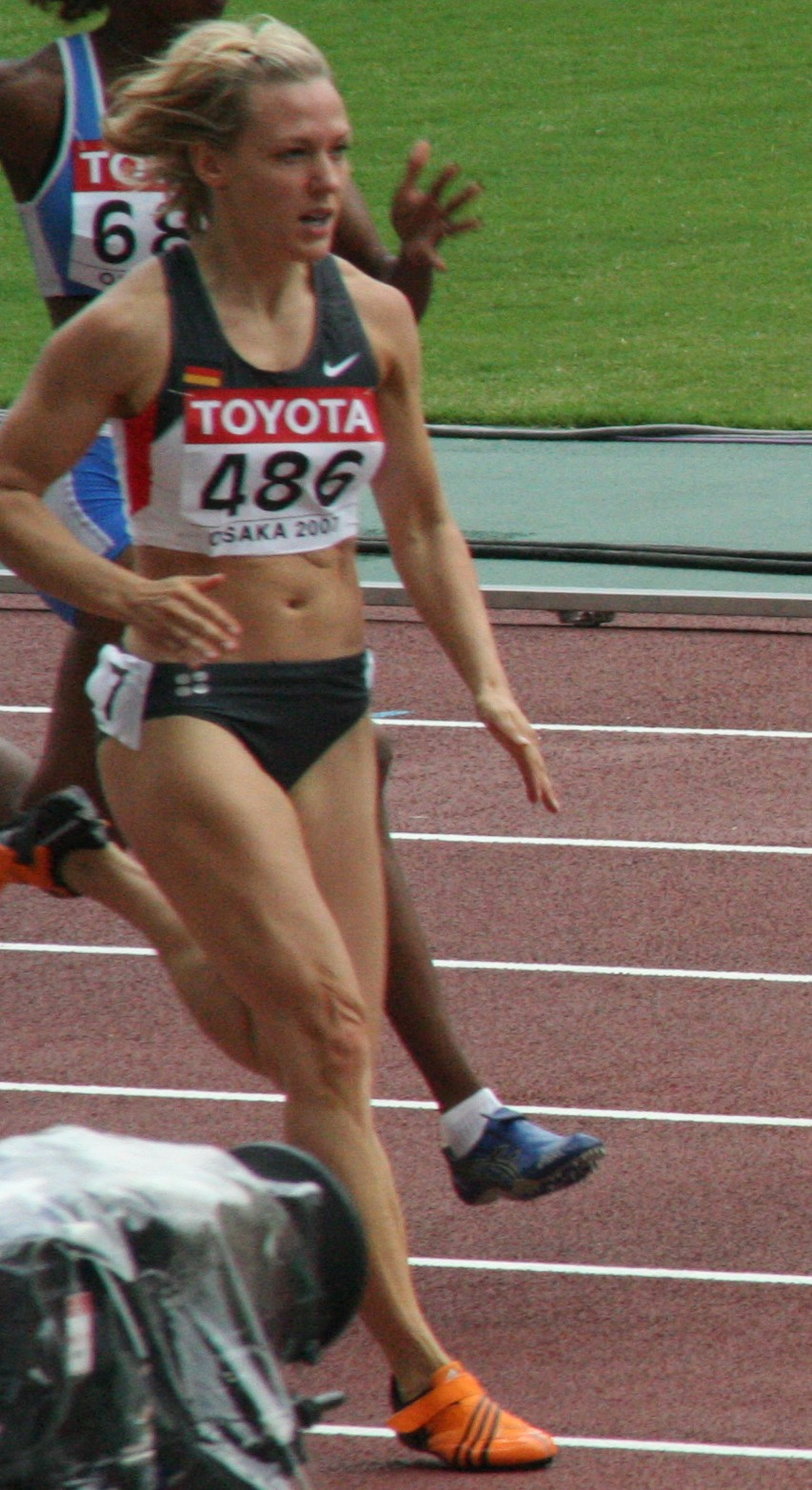
- Tschirch at the 2007 World Championships in Osaka

Personal information
- Born: 23 July 1979 (age 46) Dresden
- Height: 167 cm (5 ft 6 in)
- Weight: 54 kg (119 lb)

Sport
- Club: LG Weserbergland

Achievements and titles
- Personal best: 100 – 11.30 (2012)
Medal record
Women's athletics
Representing Germany
World Championships
Bronze medal – third place	2009 Berlin	4 × 100 m relay

Cathleen Tschirch (born 23 July 1979 in Dresden) is a German sprinter who specialises in the 200 metres. Her personal best time on the individual distance is 22.97 seconds, achieved in August 2007 in Bochum. She has a personal best of 11.42 seconds in the 100 metres.

At the 2007 World Championships she finished seventh in the 4 × 100 metres relay, together with teammates Katja Wakan, Johanna Kedzierski and Verena Sailer.

Tschirch represented Germany at the 2008 Summer Olympics in Beijing. She competed in the 4 × 100 metres relay together with Anne Möllinger, Verena Sailer and Marion Wagner. In their first round heat they placed third behind Jamaica and Russia and in front of China. Their time of 43.59 seconds was the eighth time overall out of sixteen participating nations. With this result they qualified for the final in which they sprinted to a time of 43.28 seconds, which was the fifth place.

She competes for TSV Bayer 04 Leverkusen.
