= Andreas Pohle =

German long and triple jumper

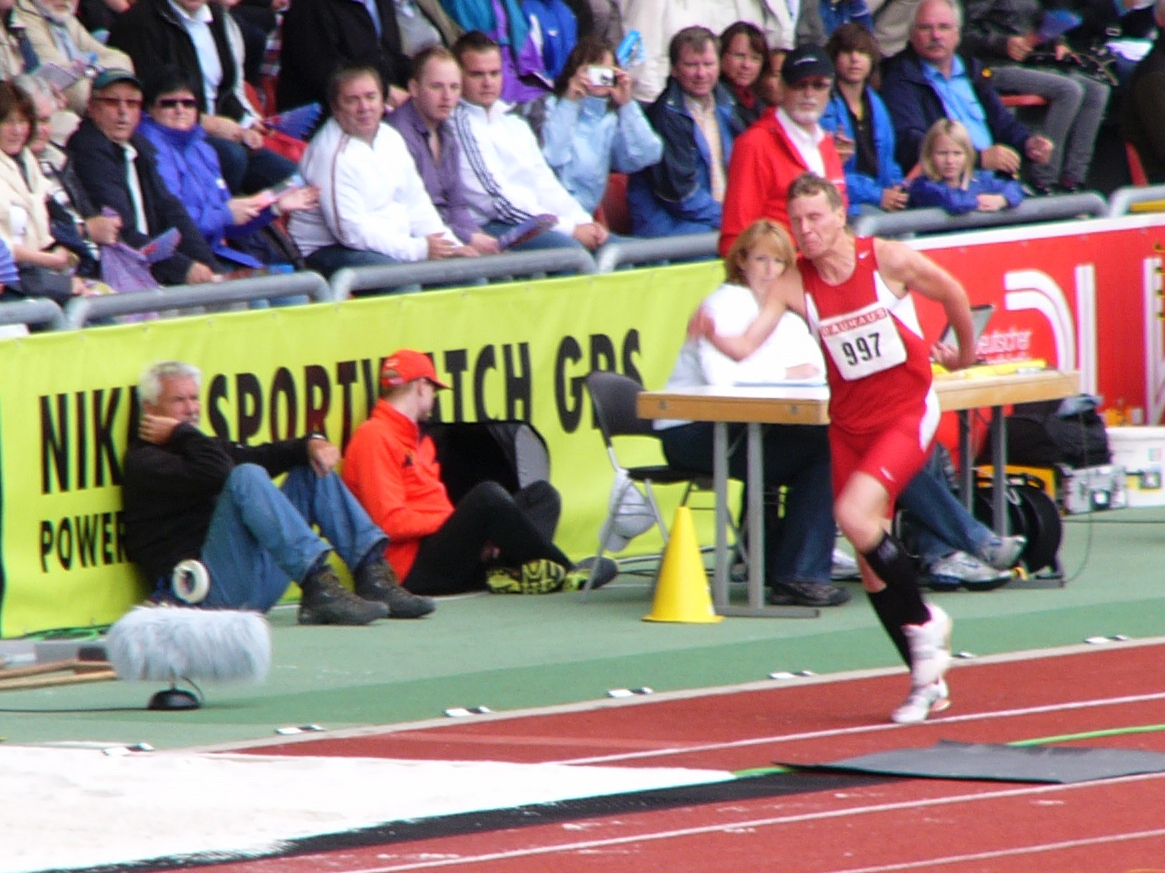
Andreas Pohle at the 2011 German Athletics Championships in Kassel

Andreas Pohle (born 6 April 1981 in Erfurt) is a German long jumper and triple jumper.

In the long jump he finished eleventh at the 2002 European Championships and ninth at the 2002 IAAF World Cup. His personal best jump is 7.97 metres, achieved in June 2002 in Bad Langensalza.

In the triple jump he competed at the 2004 Olympic Games and the 2007 European Indoor Championships without reaching the finals. His personal best jump is 16.99 metres, achieved in July 2004 in Braunschweig.

Pohle represents the sports club Team Erfurt.
