= Verena Sailer =

German sprinter

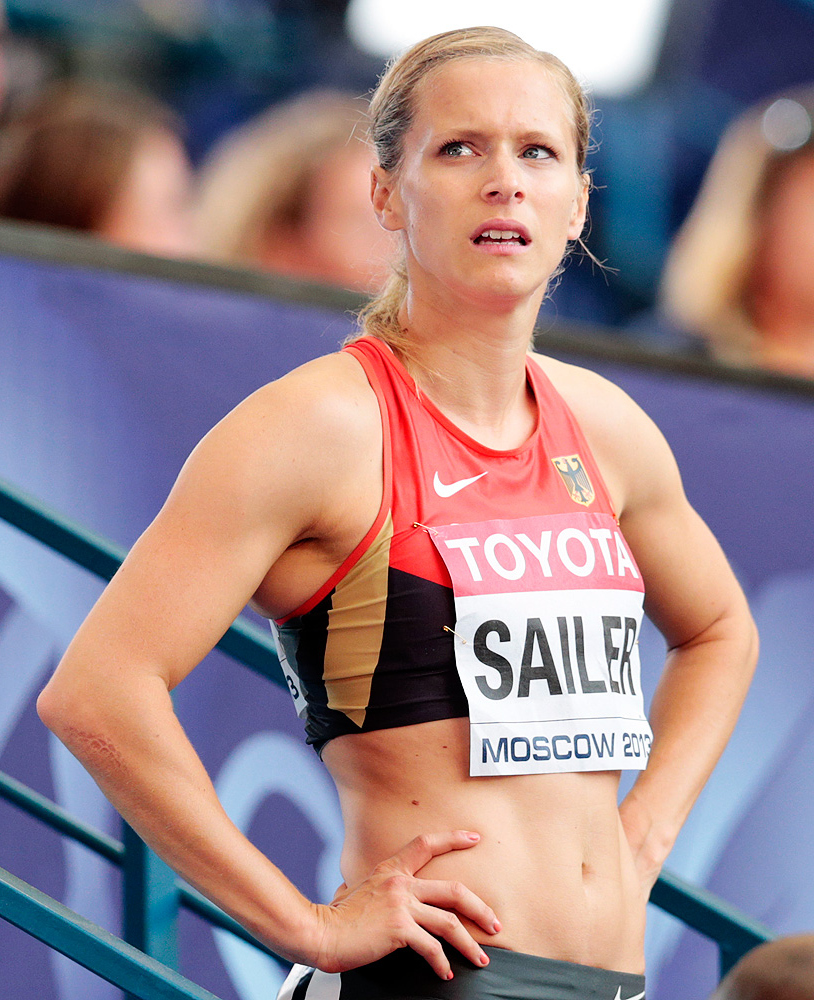
- Sailer at the 2013 World Championships

Personal information
- Full name: Verena Sailer
- Born: 16 October 1985 (age 40) Illertissen, West Germany
- Height: 1.66 m (5 ft 5 in)

Sport
- Country: Germany
- Sport: Running
- Event(s): 60 metres, 100 metres

Achievements and titles
- Personal best(s): 100m: 11.02 s (Weinheim; August 2013)
Medal record
Women's athletics
Representing Germany
World Championships
Bronze medal – third place	2009 Berlin	4 × 100 m relay
European Championships
Gold medal – first place	2010 Barcelona	100 m
Gold medal – first place	2012 Helsinki	4 × 100 m relay
European Indoor Championships
Bronze medal – third place	2009 Turin	60 m
Bronze medal – third place	2015 Prague	60 m
European U23 Championships
Gold medal – first place	2007 Debrecen	100 m
Silver medal – second place	2005 Erfurt	4 × 100 m relay
Silver medal – second place	2007 Debrecen	4 × 100 m relay
Bronze medal – third place	2005 Erfurt	100 m

Verena Sailer (born 16 October 1985 in Illertissen) is a retired German sprinter, who specialised in the 100 metres. Her personal best time is 11.02 seconds, achieved in August 2013. She won the gold medal at the 2010 European Athletics Championships in Barcelona. During her sporting career she was a member of MTG Mannheim.

Sailer represented Germany at the 2008 Summer Olympics in Beijing. She competed in the 4 × 100 metres relay together with Anne Möllinger, Cathleen Tschirch and Marion Wagner. In their first round heat they placed third behind Jamaica and Russia and in front of China. Their time of 43.59 seconds was the eighth time overall out of sixteen participating nations. With this result they qualified for the final, in which they sprinted to a time of 43.28 seconds, which was the fifth place. At the 2009 IAAF World Championships in Berlin, she made it to the semifinal of the 100 m and ran 11.24 seconds. She was the fourth leg of the German 4 × 100 m squad, which secured the bronze medal in a season's best time of 42.87 seconds.

At the 2012 European Athletics Championships in Helsinki, Sailer was unable to defend her European Championship title and finished 6th in the final heat of the 100 metres event with a time of 11.42 s. She then led the German 4 × 100 metres relay team of Leena Günther, Anne Cibis, and Tatjana Pinto as the final runner with a clear lead to win the title again since 1994 at the same venue.

At the 2012 Summer Olympics, she competed in the individual 100 m as well as the 4 × 100 m. Although she did not reach the individual final, the German team (Sailer, Leena Günther, Anne Cibis and Tatjana Pinto) did, finishing in 5th place.

== Achievements ==
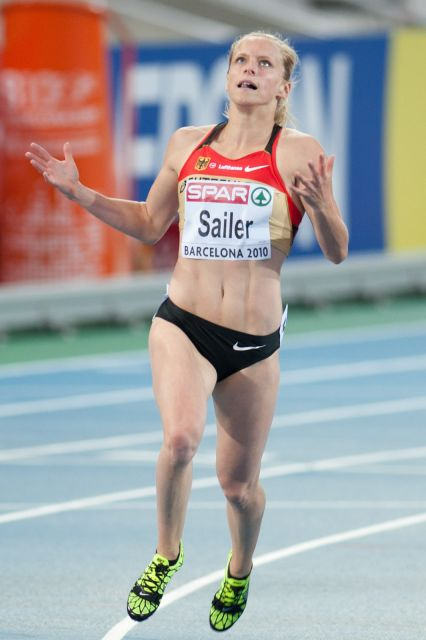
Sailer after her win at the 2010 European Championships

Year	Competition	Venue	Position	Event	Notes
Representing Germany
2004	World Junior Championships	Grosseto, Italy	5th	100 m	11.49 (wind: +1.5 m/s)
2004	World Junior Championships	Grosseto, Italy	4th (h)^{†}	4 × 100 m relay	44.58^{†}
2005	European U23 Championships	Erfurt, Germany	3rd	100 m	11.53 (wind: +1.5 m/s)
2005	European U23 Championships	Erfurt, Germany	2nd	4 × 100 m relay	44.89
2007	European U23 Championships	Debrecen, Hungary	1st	100 m	11.66 (wind: -2.0 m/s)
2007	European U23 Championships	Debrecen, Hungary	2nd	4 × 100 m relay	43.75
2007	World Championships	Osaka, Japan	7th	4 × 100 m relay	43.51
2009	European Indoor Championships	Turin, Italy	3rd	60 m	7.22
2009	World Championships	Berlin, Germany	3rd	4 × 100 m relay	42.87
2010	European Championships	Barcelona, Spain	1st	100 m	11.10 (wind: -0.6 m/s)
2012	European Championships	Helsinki, Finland	6th	100 m	11.42 (wind: -0.7 m/s)
2012	European Championships	Helsinki, Finland	1st	4 × 100 m relay	42.51
2015	European Indoor Championships	Prague, Czech Republic	3rd	60 m	7.09
2015	World Championships	Beijing, China	30th (h)	100 m	11.41
2015	World Championships	Beijing, China	5th	4 × 100 m relay	42.64

^{†}: Disqualified in the final.
