= Germany at the 2012 European Athletics Championships =

Germany competed at the 2012 European Athletics Championships held in Helsinki, Finland, between 27 June to 1 July 2012.

== Medals ==
Medal	Name	Event	Date
Gold	Sebastian Bayer	Men's Long jump	1 July
Gold	David Storl	Men's Shot put	29 June
Gold	Robert Harting	Men's Discus throw	30 June
Gold	Pascal Behrenbruch	Men's Decathlon	28 June
Gold	Leena Günther; Anne Cibis; Tatjana Lofamakanda Pinto; Verena Sailer	Women's 4 × 100 m relay	1 July
Gold	Nadine Kleinert	Women's Shot put	29 June
Silver	Arne Gabius	Men's 5000 m	27 June
Silver	Julian Reus; Tobias Unger; Alexander Kosenkow; Lucas Jakubczyk; Martin Keller	Men's 4 × 100 m relay	1 July
Silver	Björn Otto	Men's Pole vault	1 July
Silver	Martina Strutz	Women's Pole vault	30 June
Silver	Nadine Müller	Women's Discus throw	1 July
Silver	Christina Obergföll	Women's Javelin throw	29 June
Bronze	Jonas Plass; Kamghe Gaba; Eric Krüger; Thomas Schneider; Niklas Zender	Men's 4 × 400 m relay	1 July
Bronze	Raphael Holzdeppe	Men's Pole vault	1 July
Bronze	Antje Möldner-Schmidt	Women's 3000 m steeplechase	30 June
Bronze	Linda Stahl	Women's Javelin throw	29 June

== Results ==
=== Men ===
==== Track ====
Event	Athletes	Heats		Semifinal		Final	
Event	Athletes	Result	Rank	Result	Rank	Result	Rank
100 m	Lucas Jakubczyk	10.26	5 Q	10.32	9	did not advance	
100 m	Julian Reus	10.31	10 Q	10.44	14	did not advance	
100 m	Tobias Unger	DNS		did not advance			
200 m	Sebastian Ernst	20.96	16 Q	20.91	11	did not advance	
200 m	Sven Knipphals	20.94	15 Q	20.92	12	did not advance	
400 m	Eric Krüger	46.33	12 Q	46.68	16	did not advance	
800 m	Sebastian Keiner	1:48.09	18 Q	1:46.91	6	did not advance	
800 m	Sören Ludolph	1:47.10	4 Q	1:48.06	13	did not advance	
1500 m	Florian Orth	3:45.87	12 Q	—N/a		3:58.54	11
1500 m	Carsten Schlangen	3:46.52	17	—N/a		did not advance	
5000 m	Arne Gabius	—N/a				13:31.83	2nd place, silver medalist(s)
5000 m	Philipp Pflieger	—N/a				13:51.23	15
110 m hurdles	Matthias Bühler	13.93	21 Q	13.52	10	did not advance	
110 m hurdles	Alexander John	13.50	4 Q	13.43	5 Q	13.38	4
110 m hurdles	Gregor Traber	13.83	19 Q	13.62	15	did not advance	
400 m hurdles	Georg Fleischhauer	50.22	5 Q	49.52	2 Q	50.11	6
400 m hurdles	Tobias Giehl	49.98	3 Q	49.95	9	did not advance	
400 m hurdles	David Gollnow	DQ		did not advance			
3000 m steeplechase	Steffen Uliczka	8:29.55	6 q	—N/a		8:41.53	10
4 × 100 m relay	Julian Reus; Tobias Unger; Alexander Kosenkow; Lucas Jakubczyk; Martin Keller	39.04	3 Q	—N/a		38.44	2nd place, silver medalist(s)
4 × 400 m relay	Jonas Plass; Kamghe Gaba; Eric Krüger; Thomas Schneider; Niklas Zender	3:05.71	5 Q	—N/a		3:01.77	3rd place, bronze medalist(s)

==== Field ====
Event	Athletes	Qualification		Final	
Event	Athletes	Result	Rank	Result	Rank
Long jump	Sebastian Bayer	8.34	1 Q	8.34	1st place, gold medalist(s)
Long jump	Alyn Camara	7.80	17	did not advance	
Long jump	Nils Winter	7.71	22	did not advance	
Triple jump	Andreas Pohle	16.54	9 q	16.34	12
High jump	Eike Onnen	2.23	12 q	2.20	10
Pole vault	Raphael Holzdeppe	5.50	4 q	5.77	3rd place, bronze medalist(s)
Pole vault	Malte Mohr	5.50	11 q	5.77	4
Pole vault	Björn Otto	5.50	4 q	5.92	2nd place, silver medalist(s)
Shot put	Marco Schmidt	19.85	4 q	19.65	8
Shot put	David Storl	20.30	2 Q	21.58	1st place, gold medalist(s)
Discus throw	Robert Harting	65.49	3 q	68.30	1st place, gold medalist(s)
Discus throw	Markus Münch	62.83	10 q	61.25	9
Discus throw	Martin Wierig	61.34	15	did not advance	
Javelin throw	Mark Frank	75.55	16	did not advance	
Javelin throw	Tino Häber	79.86	7 q	76.11	9
Javelin throw	Thomas Röhler	78.89	13	did not advance	
Hammer throw	Markus Esser	74.04	6 q	74.49	7

==== Combined ====
Decathlon	Event	Pascal Behrenbruch		
Decathlon	Event	Results	Points	Rank
	100 m	10.93	876	5
	Long jump	7.15	850	12
	Shot put	16.89	906	1
	High jump	1.97	776	9
	400 m	48.54	883	5
	110 m hurdles	14.16	954	1
	Discus	48.24	834	1
	Pole vault	5.00	910	2
	Javelin	67.45	851	1
	1500 m	4:34.02	718	10
Final			8558	1st place, gold medalist(s)

Decathlon	Event	Mathias Brugger		
Decathlon	Event	Results	Points	Rank
	100 m	11.04	852	11
	Long jump	6.81	769	21
	Shot put	13.95	725	12
	High jump	1.97	776	14
	400 m	48.84	869	8
	110 m hurdles	15.07	841	20
	Discus	41.99	705	8
	Pole vault	DNS		
	Javelin			
	1500 m			
Final				DNF

Decathlon	Event	Norman Müller		
Decathlon	Event	Results	Points	Rank
	100 m	11.08	843	12
	Long jump	7.24	871	8
	Shot put	14.88	782	3
	High jump	2.00	803	8
	400 m	48.74	874	6
	110 m hurdles	14.83	870	17
	Discus	41.12	687	10
	Pole vault	4.80	849	7
	Javelin	55.41	669	11
	1500 m	4:28.47	755	5
Final			8003	7

=== Women ===
==== Track ====
Event	Athletes	Heats		Semifinal		Final	
Event	Athletes	Result	Rank	Result	Rank	Result	Rank
100 m	Anne Cibis	11.40	8 Q	11.36	6 Q	11.54	7
100 m	Tatjana Lofamakanda Pinto	11.41	9 Q	11.39	8 q	11.62	8
100 m	Verena Sailer	11.14	2 Q	11.17	2 Q	11.42	6
200 m	Inna Weit	23.89	22 Q	23.95	20	did not advance	
400 m	Esther Cremer	52.76	8 Q	52.77	11	did not advance	
1500 m	Corinna Harrer	4:11.59	8 Q	—N/a		4:10.38	9
1500 m	Denise Krebs	4:12.85	15	—N/a		did not advance	
1500 m	Diana Sujew	4:10.72	6 q	—N/a		4:09.28	6
5000 m	Maren Kock	—N/a				15:52.74	17
10,000 m	Sabrina Mockenhaupt	—N/a				32:16.55	5
100 m hurdles	Nadine Hildebrand	13.15	14 q	13.52	15	did not advance	
100 m hurdles	Cindy Roleder	13.12	11 Q	13.13	7 q	13.11	7
400 m hurdles	Tina Kron	57.61	18	did not advance			
3000 m steeplechase	Sanaa Koubaa	9:43.08	12 q	—N/a		10:02.33	14
3000 m steeplechase	Gesa Felicitas Krause	9:35.86	3 Q	—N/a		9:38.20	4
3000 m steeplechase	Antje Möldner-Schmidt	9:33.47	2 Q	—N/a		9:36.37	3rd place, bronze medalist(s)
4 × 100 m relay	Leena Günther; Anne Cibis; Tatjana Lofamakanda Pinto; Verena Sailer	43.03	2 Q	—N/a		42.51	1st place, gold medalist(s)
4 × 400 m relay	Esther Cremer; Janin Lindenberg; Christiane Klopsch; Fabienne Kohlmann	3:31.38	6 Q	—N/a		3:27.81	5

==== Field ====
Event	Athletes	Qualification		Final	
Event	Athletes	Result	Rank	Result	Rank
Long jump	Melanie Bauschke	6.43	10 q	6.50	8
Long jump	Sinje Florczak	6.15	24	did not advance	
Long jump	Sosthene Taroum Moguenara	6.62	4 q	6.66	4
Triple jump	Katja Demut	13.31	22	did not advance	
Triple jump	Jenny Elbe	13.98	24	did not advance	
High jump	Marie-Laurence Jungfleisch	1.87	13	did not advance	
High jump	Ariane Friedrich	DNS		did not advance	
Pole vault	Lisa Ryzih	4.40	11 q	4.40	7
Pole vault	Silke Spiegelburg	4.40	2 q	4.50	4
Pole vault	Martina Strutz	4.40	2 q	4.60	2nd place, silver medalist(s)
Shot put	Nadine Kleinert	18.65	1 Q	19.18	1st place, gold medalist(s)
Shot put	Christina Schwanitz	17.92	4 Q	18.25	5
Shot put	Josephine Terlecki	18.22	3 Q	18.33	4
Discus throw	Julia Fischer	59.95	6 q	62.10	5
Discus throw	Nadine Müller	64.49	1 Q	65.41	2nd place, silver medalist(s)
Discus throw	Anna Rüh	60.73	5 q	62.65	4
Javelin throw	Katharina Molitor	58.34	7 q	60.99	5
Javelin throw	Christina Obergföll	59.49	4 q	65.12	2nd place, silver medalist(s)
Javelin throw	Linda Stahl	59.65	3 q	63.69	3rd place, bronze medalist(s)
Hammer throw	Betty Heidler	65.06	17	did not advance	
Hammer throw	Kathrin Klaas	68.95	4 q	70.44	4

==== Combined ====
Heptathlon	Event	Claudia Rath		
Heptathlon	Event	Results	Points	Rank
	100 m hurdles	13.68	1024	7
	High jump	1.77	941	8
	Shot Put	12.88	719	11
	200 m	24.54	929	9
	Long jump	6.42	981	3
	Javelin throw	39.99	667	12
	800 m	2:11.09	949	3
Final			6210	7

Heptathlon	Event	Carolin Schäfer		
Heptathlon	Event	Results	Points	Rank
	100 m hurdles	13.68	1024	7
	High jump	1.74	903	15
	Shot Put	12.70	707	12
	200 m	24.19	963	3
	Long jump	5.91	822	15
	Javelin throw	48.81	837	4
	800 m	2:25.79	747	15
Final			6003	11
