= Great Britain at the 2012 European Athletics Championships =

Great Britain and Northern Ireland at the 2012 European Athletics Championships
- WA code: GBR
- National federation: British Athletics
- Website: www.britishathletics.org.uk

in Helsinki
- Competitors: 73
- Medals Ranked 5th: Gold 4 Silver 2 Bronze 1 Total 7

European Athletics Championships appearances
- 1934; 1938; 1946; 1950; 1954; 1958; 1962; 1966; 1969; 1971; 1974; 1978; 1982; 1986; 1990; 1994; 1998; 2002; 2006; 2010; 2012; 2014; 2016; 2018; 2022; 2024; 2026

The United Kingdom competed under the name Great Britain and Northern Ireland. The nation was represented by 82 athletes at the 2012 European Athletics Championships held in Helsinki, Finland, between 26 June - 1 July 2012.

A preliminary squad of 109 athletes was announced on 18 June 2012. However, due to the proximity of the London Olympics, any athlete who was qualified for the Olympics would not take part in the European Championships. As the Olympic Trials were held less than a week before the European Championships, the complete team was not announced until 25 June 2012. However, automatically selected field athletes were permitted to compete, if the event complimented their training schedule. Reigning European champion, Mo Farah (5,000m), was given special dispensation to defend his title. However, reigning champions Jessica Ennis and Dai Greene were absent due to their Olympic selection and Philips Idowu was injured. Shana Cox and Christine Ohuruogu had qualified for the Olympics, and were taken as part of the relay team, and not permitted to participate individually. A number of high-profile athletes were also seeking Olympic selection following the Olympic trials. Many athletes who won, or finished second, at the Olympic trials, were requiring an Olympic 'A' Standard, to receive automatic selection.

Finally, at the Championships, 73 athletes took part in the events.

== Medals ==
Medal	Name	Event	Date
Gold	Mo Farah	Men's 5000 metres	27 June
Gold	Rhys Williams	Men's 400 metres hurdles	29 June
Gold	Robert Grabarz	Men's high jump	29 June
Gold	Lynsey Sharp	Women's 800 metres	29 June
Silver	Conrad Williams; Nigel Levine; Robert Tobin; Richard Buck Michael Bingham (Heats) Luke Lennon-Ford (Heats)	Men's 4 x 400 metres relay	1 July
Silver	Joanne Pavey	Women's 10,000 metres	1 July
Bronze	Danny Talbot	Men's 200 metres	30 June

== Results ==
=== Men ===
==== Track ====
Event	Athletes	Heats		Semifinal		Final	
Event	Athletes	Result	Rank	Result	Rank	Result	Rank
100 m	Harry Aikines-Aryeetey	10.27	8 Q	10.30	7 Q	10.31	4
100 m	Mark Lewis-Francis	10.39	16 Q	10.36	11	did not advance	
200 m	Chris Clarke	20.83	10 Q	20.90	9 Q	21.26	6
200 m	Danny Talbot	20.82	9 Q	20.69	3 Q	20.95	3rd place, bronze medalist(s)
400 m	Richard Buck	45.83	2 Q	46.13	9 Q	45.92	5
400 m	Luke Lennon-Ford	Disqualified		did not advance			
800 m	Mukhtar Mohammed	1:47.13	5 Q	1:48.84	16	did not advance	
800 m	Gareth Warburton	1:45.80	1 Q	1:47.37	11	did not advance	
1500 m	Thomas Lancashire	3:47.80	22	—N/a		did not advance	
5000 m	Mo Farah	—N/a				13:29.91	1st place, gold medalist(s)
5000 m	Mitch Goose	—N/a				14:21.91	23
5000 m	Rory Fraser	—N/a				13:51.05	14
10,000 m	Keith Gerrard	—N/a				28:57.97	9
110 m hurdles	Richard Alleyne	14.02	26	did not advance			
110 m hurdles	Gianni Frankis	13.71	16 q	13.68	17	did not advance	
110 m hurdles	William Sharman	13.63	11 Q	13.55	11	did not advance	
400 m hurdles	Rhys Williams	50.40	9 Q	49.63	4 Q	49.33	1st place, gold medalist(s)
400 m hurdles	Nathan Woodward	50.02	4 Q	49.68	5 q	50.20	7
400 m hurdles	Richard Yates	52.12	32	did not advance			
3000 m steeplechase	Luke Gunn	did not finish		—N/a		did not advance	
3000 m steeplechase	Rob Mullett	8:48.38	20	—N/a		did not advance	
3000 m steeplechase	James Wilkinson	8:39.19	16	—N/a		did not advance	
4 × 100 m relay	Christian Malcolm; Dwain Chambers; James Ellington; Mark Lewis-Francis	38.98	1 Q	—N/a		did not advance	
4 × 400 m relay	Luke Lennon-Ford*; Michael Bingham*; Conrad Williams; Nigel Levine; Robert Tobin; Richard Buck	3:05.50	3 Q	—N/a		3:01.56	2nd place, silver medalist(s)

*Athletes who run the heats but not the final.

==== Combined ====
Decathlon	Event	Ashley Bryant		
Decathlon	Event	Results	Points	Rank
	100 m	11.08	843	12
	Long jump	7.12	842	15
	Shot put	13.08	672	20
	High jump	1.88	696	22
	400 m	49.29	848	11
	110 m hurdles	14.74	881	13
	Discus	39.94	663	14
	Pole vault	4.50	760	17
	Javelin	66.71	839	2
	1500 m	4:49.16	624	15
Final			7668	12

==== Field ====
Event	Athletes	Qualification		Final	
Event	Athletes	Result	Rank	Result	Rank
Long jump	JJ Jegede	8.01	5 q	8.10	4
Long jump	Julian Reid	7.73	21	did not advance	
Long jump	Chris Tomlinson	7.84	13	did not advance	
Triple jump	Onochie Achike	16.25	15	did not advance	
High jump	Robert Grabarz	2.23	3 q	2.31	1st place, gold medalist(s)
High jump	Samson Oni	2.23	10 q	No mark	—
High jump	Tom Parsons	2.10	28	did not advance	
Pole vault	Max Eaves	5.30	14	did not advance	
Pole vault	Luke Cutts	5.10	20	did not advance	
Pole vault	Andrew Sutcliffe	5.30	16	did not advance	
Shot put	Carl Myerscough	19.30	14	did not advance	
Discus throw	Abdul Buhari	58.57	24	did not advance	
Discus throw	Brett Morse	58.71	23	did not advance	
Discus throw	Lawrence Okoye	64.86	5 q	60.09	12
Hammer throw	Mark Dry	70.27	25	did not advance	

=== Women ===
==== Track ====
Event	Athletes	Heats		Semifinal		Final	
Event	Athletes	Result	Rank	Result	Rank	Result	Rank
100 m	Ashleigh Nelson	11.43	10 Q	11.43	11	did not advance	
100 m	Jeanette Kwakye	11.98	29	did not advance			
200 m	Abiodun Oyepitan	23.05	4 Q	23.22	8	did not advance	
400 m	Kelly Massey	54.44	24	did not advance			
400 m	Lee McConnell	52.58	7 Q	51.98	3 Q	52.20	5
400 m	Nicola Sanders	did not start		did not advance			
800 m	Jenny Meadows	did not start		—N/a		did not advance	
800 m	Lynsey Sharp	2:01.88	5 Q	—N/a		2:00.52	1st place, gold medalist(s)
800 m	Jemma Simpson	2:01.64	4 q	—N/a		2:02.14	7
1500 m	Lynsey Sharp	Disqualified		—N/a		did not advance	
5000 m	Julia Bleasdale	—N/a				15:12.77	4
5000 m	Helen Clitheroe	—N/a				15:49.13	16
5000 m	Stephanie Twell	—N/a				did not start	
10,000 m	Joanne Pavey	—N/a				31:49.03	2nd place, silver medalist(s)
10,000 m	Charlotte Purdue	—N/a				32:28.46	6
10,000 m	Gemma Steel	—N/a				32:46.32	9
400 m hurdles	Meghan Beesley	57.18	16 q	57.32	14	did not advance	
3000 m steeplechase	Hatti Archer	9:57.00	17	—N/a		did not advance	
4 × 100 m relay	Anyika Onuora; Montell Douglas; Hayley Jones; Ashleigh Nelson	Disqualified		—N/a		did not advance	
4 × 400 m relay	Eilidh Child; Kelly Massey*; Nicola Sanders; Shana Cox; Lee McConnell	3:29.96	3 Q	—N/a		3:26.20	4

*Athletes who run in the heats but not in the final.

==== Field ====
Event	Athletes	Qualification		Final	
Event	Athletes	Result	Rank	Result	Rank
Long jump	Abigail Irozuru	6.19	22	did not advance	
High jump	Isobel Pooley	1.78	21	did not advance	
Pole vault	Sally Peake	4.15	20	did not advance	
Shot put	Eden Francis	16.35	14	did not advance	
Discus throw	Jade Nicholls	51.75	22	did not advance	
Javelin throw	Goldie Sayers	60.90	2 Q	63.01	4
Javelin throw	Laura Whittingham	52.82	19	did not advance	
Hammer throw	Sophie Hitchon	67.08	11 q	67.17	11
Hammer throw	Sarah Holt	61.18	22	did not advance	
