= France at the 2012 European Athletics Championships =

France was represented by 68 athletes at the 2012 European Athletics Championships in Helsinki, Finland.

== Medals ==
| Medal | Name | Event | Date |
|---|---|---|---|
| Gold | Éloyse Lesueur | Women's long jump | 28 June |
| Gold | Christophe Lemaitre | Men's 100 m | 28 June |
| Gold | Mahiedine Mekhissi-Benabbad | Men's 3000 m steeplechase | 29 June |
| Gold | Antoinette Nana Djimou Ida | Heptathlon | 30 June |
| Gold | Renaud Lavillenie | Men's pole vault | 1 July |
| Silver | Jimmy Vicaut | Men's 100 m | 28 June |
| Silver | Florian Carvalho | Men's 1500 m | 1 July |
| Silver | Garfield Darien | 110 m hurdles | 1 July |
| Silver | Phara Anacharsis; Elea-Mariama Diarra; Lenora Guion Firmin; Floria Gueï; Marie Gayot | 4 × 400 m relay | 1 July |
| Bronze | Yannick Fonsat | Men's 400 m | 29 June |
| Bronze | Pierre-Ambroise Bosse | Men's 800 m | 29 June |
| Bronze | Emmanuel Biron; Christophe Lemaitre; Pierre-Alexis Pessonneaux; Jimmy Vicaut; Ronald Pognon | Men's 4 × 100 m relay | 1 July |
| Bronze | Mickaël Hanany | Men's high jump | 29 June |
| Bronze | Myriam Soumaré | Women's 200 metres | 30 June |

== Results ==
=== Men ===
==== Track ====
| Event | Athletes | Heats | | Semifinal | | Final | |
| Event | Athletes | Result | Rank | Result | Rank | Result | Rank |
|---|---|---|---|---|---|---|---|
| 100 m | Emmanuel Biron | 10.28 | 8 Q | 10.43 | 13 | did not advance | |
| 100 m | Christophe Lemaitre | 10.14 | 1 Q | 10.14 | 2 Q | 10.09 | 1st place, gold medalist(s) |
| 100 m | Jimmy Vicaut | 10.18 | 2 Q | 10.22 | 3 Q | 10.12 | 2nd place, silver medalist(s) |
| 200 m | Ben Bassaw | 20.73 | 2 Q | 20.91 | 10 | did not advance | |
| 400 m | Yannick Fonsat | 45.92 | 5 Q | 45.78 | 5 q | 45.82 | 3rd place, bronze medalist(s) |
| 400 m | Teddy Venel | Disqualified | | did not advance | | | |
| 800 m | Pierre-Ambroise Bosse | 1:48.23 | 20 Q | 1:46.70 | 4 Q | 1:48.83 | 3rd place, bronze medalist(s) |
| 800 m | Hamid Oualich | 1:48.44 | 23 Q | 1:47.14 | 8 | did not advance | |
| 800 m | Paul Renaudie | 1:47.74 | 14 Q | 1:48.97 | 18 | did not advance | |
| 1500 m | Florian Carvalho | 3:41.50 | 4 Q | —N/a | | 3:46.33 | 2nd place, silver medalist(s) |
| 1500 m | Gregory Beugnet | 3:46.53 | 18 | —N/a | | did not advance | |
| 5000 m | Yohan Durand | —N/a | | | | 13:32.65 | 4 |
| 10000 m | Denis Mayaud | —N/a | | | | 29:16.83 | 17 |
| 110 m hurdles | Samuel Coco-Viloin | 13.72 | 17 Q | 13.50 | 9 | did not advance | |
| 110 m hurdles | Garfield Darien | 13.46 | 2 Q | 13.15 | 2 Q | 13.20 | 2nd place, silver medalist(s) |
| 110 m hurdles | Ladji Doucouré | 13.96 | 23 Q | 13.66 | 16 | did not advance | |
| 400 m hurdles | Adrien Clémenceau | 49.84 | 2 Q | 49.80 | 7 Q | 49.70 | 4 |
| 3000 m steeplechase | Nordine Gezzar | 8:31.33 | 8 Q | —N/a | | 8:36.98 | 4 |
| 3000 m steeplechase | Mahiedine Mekhissi-Benabbad | 8:31.05 | 7 Q | —N/a | | 8:33.23 | 1st place, gold medalist(s) |
| 3000 m steeplechase | Noureddine Smaïl | 8:41.11 | 17 | —N/a | | did not advance | |
| 4 × 100 m relay | Emmanuel Biron; Christophe Lemaitre; Pierre-Alexis Pessonneaux; Jimmy Vicaut*; Ronald Pognon | 39.01 | 2 Q | —N/a | | 38.46 | 3rd place, bronze medalist(s) |
| 4 × 400 m relay | Teddy Venel; Naman Keïta*; Marc Macedot; Mame-Ibra Anne*; Toumane Coulibaly; Yannick Fonsat | 3:06.44 | 8 q | —N/a | | 3:03.04 | 6 |

*Athletes who run the heats but not the final.

==== Combined ====
| Decathlon | Event | Florian Geffrouais | | |
| Decathlon | Event | Results | Points | Rank |
|---|---|---|---|---|
| | 100 m | 11.19 | 819 | 19 |
| | Long jump | No Mark | 0 | |
| | Shot put | 14.31 | 747 | 8 |
| | High jump | DNS | | |
| | 400 m | | | |
| | 110 m hurdles | | | |
| | Discus | | | |
| | Pole vault | | | |
| | Javelin | | | |
| | 1500 m | | | |
| Final | | | | DNF |

| Decathlon | Event | Kevin Mayer | | |
| Decathlon | Event | Results | Points | Rank |
|---|---|---|---|---|
| | 100 m | 11.10 | 838 | 14 |
| | Long jump | No Mark | 0 | |
| | Shot put | 12.25 | 622 | 24 |
| | High jump | DNS | | |
| | 400 m | | | |
| | 110 m hurdles | | | |
| | Discus | | | |
| | Pole vault | | | |
| | Javelin | | | |
| | 1500 m | | | |
| Final | | | | DNF |

| Decathlon | Event | Gaël Quérin | | |
| Decathlon | Event | Results | Points | Rank |
|---|---|---|---|---|
| | 100 m | 11.17 | 823 | 17 |
| | Long jump | 7.56 | 950 | 1 |
| | Shot put | 13.05 | 670 | 23 |
| | High jump | 1.97 | 776 | 9 |
| | 400 m | 48.20 | 899 | 3 |
| | 110 m hurdles | 14.37 | 927 | 5 |
| | Discus | 40.32 | 671 | 13 |
| | Pole vault | 5.00 | 910 | 2 |
| | Javelin | 53.60 | 642 | 14 |
| | 1500 m | 4:17.29 | 830 | 1 |
| Final | | | 8098 | 5 |

==== Field ====
| Event | Athletes | Qualification | | Final | |
| Event | Athletes | Result | Rank | Result | Rank |
|---|---|---|---|---|---|
| Long jump | Kafétien Gomis | 7.89 | 12 q | 7.88 | 9 |
| Long jump | Frédéric Erin | 7.53 | 26 | did not advance | |
| Long jump | Salim Sdiri | 7.96 | 9 q | 7.48 | 12 |
| Triple jump | Karl Taillepierre | 16.20 | 18 | did not advance | |
| High jump | Mickaël Hanany | 2.23 | 3 q | 2.28 | 3rd place, bronze medalist(s) |
| High jump | Fabrice Saint-Jean | 2.23 | 13 | did not advance | |
| Pole vault | Jérôme Clavier | 5.30 | 12 | 5.40 | 10 |
| Pole vault | Renaud Lavillenie | 5.55 | 1 Q | 5.97 | 1st place, gold medalist(s) |
| Pole vault | Romain Mesnil | No mark | | did not advance | |
| Hammer throw | Quentin Bigot | 70.78 | 24 | did not advance | |
| Hammer throw | Jérôme Bortoluzzi | 73.46 | 10 q | 74.49 | 8 |
| Hammer throw | Romain Mesnil | 72.84 | 13 | did not advance | |

=== Women ===
==== Track ====
| Event | Athletes | Heats | | Semifinal | | Final | |
| Event | Athletes | Result | Rank | Result | Rank | Result | Rank |
|---|---|---|---|---|---|---|---|
| 100 m | Christine Arron | 11.55 | 17 | did not advance | | | |
| 200 m | Johanna Danois | 23.42 | 14 q | 23.40 | 11 Q | 23.61 | 8 |
| 200 m | Lina Jacques-Sébastien | 23.09 | 6 Q | 23.45 | 12 | did not advance | |
| 200 m | Myriam Soumaré | 23.10 | 7 Q | 23.04 | 4 Q | 23.21 | 3rd place, bronze medalist(s) |
| 400 m | Marie Gayot | 52.46 | 5 Q | 52.17 | 9 | did not advance | |
| 400 m | Muriel Hurtis-Houairi | 52.11 | 2 Q | 52.13 | 7 q | 54.50 | 8 |
| 1500 m | Hind Dehiba | 4:12.79 | 14 | —N/a | | did not advance | |
| 5000 m | Christine Bardelle | —N/a | | | | 15:33.49 | 12 |
| 100 m hurdles | Alice Decaux | 13.13 | 12 Q | 13.35 | 14 | did not advance | |
| 100 m hurdles | Aisseta Diawara | 13.10 | 8 Q | Disqualified | | did not advance | |
| 100 m hurdles | Sandra Gomis | 13.63 | 26 | did not advance | | | |
| 400 m hurdles | Phara Anacharsis | 58.02 | 22 | did not advance | | | |
| 4 × 100 m relay | Carima Louami; Ayodelé Ikuesan; Jennifer Galais*; Christine Arron; Lina Jacques-Sébastien | 43.12 | 3 Q | —N/a | | 43.44 | 5 |
| 4 × 400 m relay | Phara Anacharsis; Elea-Mariama Diarra*; Lenora Guion Firmin; Floria Gueï; Marie Gayot | 3:29.03 | 1 Q | —N/a | | 3:25.49 | 2nd place, silver medalist(s) |

*Athletes who run the heats but not the final

==== Combined ====
| Heptathlon | Event | Antoinette Nana Djimou Ida | | |
| Heptathlon | Event | Results | Points | Rank |
|---|---|---|---|---|
| | 100 m hurdles | 13.11 | 1108 | 1 |
| | High jump | 1.77 | 941 | 10 |
| | Shot Put | 13.48 | 759 | 7 |
| | 200 m | 24.52 | 931 | 8 |
| | Long jump | 6.42 | 981 | 2 |
| | Javelin throw | 55.82 | 973 | 1 |
| | 800 m | 2:17.99 | 851 | 11 |
| Final | | | 6544 | 1st place, gold medalist(s) |

| Heptathlon | Event | Blandine Maisonnier | | |
| Heptathlon | Event | Results | Points | Rank |
|---|---|---|---|---|
| | 100 m hurdles | 13.77 | 1011 | 9 |
| | High jump | 1.80 | 978 | 6 |
| | Shot Put | 12.22 | 676 | 17 |
| | 200 m | 24.90 | 896 | 12 |
| | Long jump | 6.27 | 934 | 6 |
| | Javelin throw | 38.96 | 647 | 13 |
| | 800 m | 2:16.86 | 867 | 8 |
| Final | | | 6009 | 10 |

==== Field ====
| Event | Athletes | Qualification | | Final | |
| Event | Athletes | Result | Rank | Result | Rank |
|---|---|---|---|---|---|
| Long jump | Éloyse Lesueur | 6.66 | 1 Q | 6.81 | 1st place, gold medalist(s) |
| Triple jump | Françoise Mbango Etone | 14.38 | 3 Q | 14.19 | 8 |
| High jump | Melanie Melfort | 1.90 | 7 q | 1.92 | 6 |
| Pole vault | Vanessa Boslak | 4.40 | 9 q | 4.50 | 6 |
| Shot put | Jessica Cérival | 17.15 | 9 q | 17.20 | 9 |
| Discus throw | Mélina Robert-Michon | 61.86 | 3 Q | 60.41 | 6 |
| Hammer throw | Stéphanie Falzon | 68.42 | 7 q | 68.03 | 6 |
