= Portugal at the 2012 European Athletics Championships =

- WA code: POR
- National federation: Federação Portuguesa de Atletismo
- Website: www.fpatletismo.pt

in Helsinki
- Competitors: 35 in 17 events
- Medals Ranked =11th: Gold 1 Silver 1 Bronze 1 Total 3

European Athletics Championships appearances
- 1934; 1938; 1946; 1950; 1954; 1958; 1962; 1966; 1969; 1971; 1974; 1978; 1982; 1986; 1990; 1994; 1998; 2002; 2006; 2010; 2012; 2014; 2016; 2018; 2022; 2024

Portugal was represented at the 2012 European Athletics Championships, held in Helsinki, Finland, from 27 June to 1 July 2012, with a delegation of 35 competitors (18 men and 17 women), who took part in 17 events.

== Medalists ==
| Medal | Name | Event | Date |
|---|---|---|---|
| Gold | Ana Dulce Félix | Women's 10,000 metres | 1 July |
| Silver | Patrícia Mamona | Women's triple jump | 29 June |
| Bronze | Sara Moreira | Women's 5000 metres | 28 June |

== Participants ==
| Event | Men | Women |
|---|---|---|
| 100 m | Arnaldo Abrantes | Sónia Tavares |
| 200 m | Arnaldo Abrantes | Sónia Tavares |
| 1500 m | Hélio Gomes | |
| 5000 m | | Sara Moreira |
| 10,000 m | Yousef El Kalai | Ana Dias |
| 10,000 m | José Rocha | Ana Dulce Félix |
| 10,000 m | Rui Pedro Silva | Leonor Carneiro |
| 100 m hurdles | | Mónica Lopes |
| 110 m hurdles | João Almeida | |
| 110 m hurdles | Rasul Dabó | |
| 400 m hurdles | Jorge Paula | Vera Barbosa |
| 400 m hurdles | Ricardo Lima | Vera Barbosa |
| 400 m hurdles | João Ferreira | Vera Barbosa |
| 3000 m steeplechase | Alberto Paulo | Clarisse Cruz |
| 3000 m steeplechase | Alberto Paulo | Carla Salomé Rocha |
| 4 × 100 m relay | Ricardo Monteiro; Dany Gonçalves; Arnaldo Abrantes; Yazaldes Nascimento | |
| 4 × 400 m relay | | Carla Tavares; Carolina Duarte; Vera Barbosa; Joceline Monteiro |
| Long jump | Marcos Chuva | |
| Triple jump | Marcos Caldeira | Patrícia Mamona |
| Triple jump | Marcos Caldeira | Susana Costa |
| Pole vault | Edi Maia | Maria Eleonor Tavares |
| Shot Put | Marco Fortes | |
| Discus throw | | Irina Rodrigues |
| Hammer throw | | Vânia Silva |

== Results ==
=== Men ===
==== Track ====
| Event | Athletes | Heats | | Semifinal | | Final | |
| Event | Athletes | Result | Rank | Result | Rank | Result | Rank |
|---|---|---|---|---|---|---|---|
| 100 m | Arnaldo Abrantes | 10.49 | 20 q | 10.47 | 16 | DNQ | |
| 200 m | Arnaldo Abrantes | 21.24 | 23 q | 21.36 | 19 | DNQ | |
| 1500 m | Hélio Gomes | 3:41.56 | 5 q | — | | 3:46.50 | 4 |
| 10,000 m | Rui Pedro Silva | — | | | | 28:31.16 | 8 |
| 10,000 m | Yousef El Kalai | — | | | | | DNF |
| 10,000 m | José Rocha | — | | | | | DNF |
| 110 m hurdles | João Almeida | 13.63 | 11 Q | 13.56 | 12 | DNQ | |
| 110 m hurdles | Rasul Dabó | 14.00 | 25 Q | 13.73 | 19 | DNQ | |
| 400 m hurdles | Jorge Paula | 50.74 | 16 Q | 50.58 | 17 | DNQ | |
| 400 m hurdles | Ricardo Lima | 53.00 | 36 | DNQ | | | |
| 400 m hurdles | João Ferreira | | DNF | DNQ | | | |
| 300 m steeplechase | Alberto Paulo | 8:41.63 | 18 | DNQ | | | |
| 4 × 100 m relay | Ricardo Monteiro; Dany Gonçalves; Arnaldo Abrantes; Yazaldes Nascimento | 39.66 | 8 q | — | | 39.96 | 6 |

==== Field ====
| Event | Athletes | Qualification | | Final | |
| Event | Athletes | Result | Rank | Result | Rank |
|---|---|---|---|---|---|
| Long jump | Marcos Chuva | 7.96 | 8 q | | |
| Triple jump | Marcos Caldeira | 15.95 | 22 | DNQ | |
| Pole vault | Edi Maia | | NM | DNQ | |
| Shot put | Marco Fortes | 19.66 | 8 q | 20.24 | 5 |

=== Women ===
==== Track ====
| Event | Athletes | Heats | | Semifinal | | Final | |
| Event | Athletes | Result | Rank | Result | Rank | Result | Rank |
|---|---|---|---|---|---|---|---|
| 100 m | Sónia Tavares | 11.65 | 25 | DNQ | | | |
| 200 m | Sónia Tavares | 24.00 | 25 | DNQ | | | |
| 5000 m | Sara Moreira | — | | | | 15:12.05 | 3rd place, bronze medalist(s) |
| 10,000 m | Ana Dias | — | | | | 32:35.82 | 7 |
| 10,000 m | Ana Dulce Félix | — | | | | 31:44.75 | 1st place, gold medalist(s) |
| 10,000 m | Leonor Carneiro | — | | | | 33:05.92 PB | 10 |
| 100 m hurdles | Mónica Lopes | 13.83 | 27 | DNQ | | | |
| 400 m hurdles | Vera Barbosa | 55.80 | 5 Q | 56.58 | 11 | DNQ | |
| 3000 m steeplechase | Clarisse Cruz | 9:40.30 | 9 q | — | | 9:47.76 | 9 |
| 3000 m steeplechase | Carla Salomé Rocha | 10:02.00 | 20 | DNQ | | | |
| 4 × 400 m relay | Carla Tavares; Carolina Duarte; Vera Barbosa; Joceline Monteiro | 3:40.79 | 15 | DNQ | | | |

==== Field ====
| Event | Athletes | Qualification | | Final | |
| Event | Athletes | Result | Rank | Result | Rank |
|---|---|---|---|---|---|
| Triple jump | Patrícia Mamona | 14.41 | 2 Q | 14.52 | Silver medal |
| Triple jump | Susana Costa | 13.99 | 13 | DNQ | |
| Pole vault | Maria Eleonor Tavares | 4.25 | 17 | DNQ | |
| Discus throw | Irina Rodrigues | 53.01 | 20 | DNQ | |
| Hammer throw | Vânia Silva | 62.81 | 20 | DNQ | |
