= Switzerland at the 2012 European Athletics Championships =

Switzerland competed at the 2012 European Athletics Championships held in Helsinki, Finland, between 27 June to 1 July 2012.

== Results ==
=== Men ===
==== Track ====
Event	Athletes	Heats		Semifinal		Final	
Event	Athletes	Result	Rank	Result	Rank	Result	Rank
100 m	Rolf Fongué	10.53	21 q	10.50	18	did not advance	
100 m	Reto Schenkel	10.38	15 Q	10.48	17	did not advance	
200 m	Reto Schenkel	20.96	16 Q	21.05	14	did not advance	
200 m	Alex Wilson	20.75	5 Q	20.87	8	did not advance	
1500 m	Stefan Breit	3:50.79	25	—N/a		did not advance	
5000 m	Philipp Bandi	—N/a				14:07.48	22
400 m hurdles	Kariem Hussein	50.94	20 Q	50.81	19	did not advance	
4 × 100 m relay	Alex Wilson; Reto Schenkel; Steven Gugerli; Marc Schneeberger; Rolf Fongué	39.41	6 Q	—N/a		38.83	7

==== Combined ====
Decathlon	Event	Jonas Fringeli		
Decathlon	Event	Results	Points	Rank
	100 m	11.22	812	22
	Long jump	7.04	823	17
	Shot put	13.28	684	18
	High jump	1.97	776	11
	400 m	48.75	873	7
	110 m hurdles	14.64	894	10
	Discus	40.80	681	12
	Pole vault	4.60	790	14
	Javelin	51.33	608	17
	1500 m	4:24.93	778	3
Final			7719	11

=== Women ===
==== Track ====
Event	Athletes	Heats		Semifinal		Final	
Event	Athletes	Result	Rank	Result	Rank	Result	Rank
100 m	Mujinga Kambundji	11.68	27	did not advance			
200 m	Jacqueline Gasser	24.18	28	did not advance			
200 m	Léa Sprunger	23.08	5 Q	23.49	13	did not advance	
100 m hurdles	Clélia Reuse	13.25	18	did not advance			
5000 m	Sabine Fischer	—N/a				DNF	
3000 m steeplechase	Astrid Leutert	DNF		—N/a		did not advance	
4 × 100 m relay	Michelle Cueni; Jacqueline Gasser; Ellen Sprunger; Léa Sprunger	43.51	5 q	—N/a		43.61	6

==== Field ====
Event	Athletes	Qualification		Final	
Event	Athletes	Result	Rank	Result	Rank
Long jump	Irène Pusterla	6.44	8 q	6.53	7
Pole vault	Nicole Büchler	NM		did not advance	
