= Romania at the 2012 European Athletics Championships =

Romania competed at the 2012 European Athletics Championships in Helsinki, Finland, from 27 June to 1 July 2012. It did not win any medals.

== Results ==
=== Men ===
==== Track ====
Event	Athletes	Heats		Semifinal		Final	
Event	Athletes	Result	Rank	Result	Rank	Result	Rank
100 m	Cătălin Cîmpeanu	10.65	27	Did not advance			
200 m	Cătălin Cîmpeanu	21.37	26	Did not advance			
400 m	Sorin Vatamanu	47.50	25	Did not advance			
800 m	Ionut Zaizan	1:47.31	6 Q	1:49.91	21	Did not advance	
1500 m	Raul Botezan	3:46.39	16	—N/a		Did not advance	
400 m hurdles	Attila Nagy	52.04	31	Did not advance			
3000 m steeplechase	Alexandru Ghinea	8:55.88	22	—N/a		Did not advance	

==== Field ====
Event	Athletes	Qualification		Final	
Event	Athletes	Result	Rank	Result	Rank
High jump	Mihai Donişan	2.23	6 q	2.24	8
High jump	Marius Dumitrache	2.15	27	Did not advance	
Triple junp	Marian Oprea	16.17	19	Did not advance	
Discus throw	Sergiu Ursu	56.85	29	Did not advance	

=== Women ===
==== Track ====
Event	Athletes	Heats		Semifinal		Final	
Event	Athletes	Result	Rank	Result	Rank	Result	Rank
100 m	Andreea Ogrăzeanu	11.55	17	Did not advance			
200 m	Andreea Ogrăzeanu	23.54	16 Q	23.66	17	Did not advance	
400 m	Sanda Belgyan	53.32	17	Did not advance			
400 m	Adelina Pastor	54.35	23	Did not advance			
800 m	Mirela Lavric	—N/a		2:11.61	18	Did not advance	
1500 m	Ioana Doagă	4:13.73	16	—N/a		Did not advance	
5000 m	Roxana Bârcă	—N/a				15:13.40	5
100 m hurdles	Viorica Țigău	13.59	24	Did not advance			
400 m hurdles	Angela Moroșanu	55.37	2 Q	58.96	16	Did not advance	
3000 m steeplechase	Ancuța Bobocel	9:40.88	10 q	—N/a		9:41.32	5
4 × 100 m relay	Sanda Belgyan; Mirela Lavric; Bianca Răzor; Angela Moroșanu; Alina Panainte*	3:31.48	7 Q	—N/a		3:29.80	7

==== Field ====
Event	Athletes	Qualification		Final	
Event	Athletes	Result	Rank	Result	Rank
Long jump	Viorica Țigău	6.29	17	Did not advance	
Long jump	Cristina Sandu	6.22	20	Did not advance	
Long jump	Alina Rotaru	6.19	21	Did not advance	
Triple jump	Cristina Bujin	13.34	21	Did not advance	
Triple jump	Adelina Gavrilă	13.61	20	Did not advance	
Shot put	Anca Heltne	16.70	12 q	16.39	12
Hammer throw	Bianca Perie	67.46	10 q	67.24	10
Javelin throw	Maria Negoita	51.96	20	Did not advance	
