= Czech Republic at the 2012 European Athletics Championships =

Czech Republic competed at the 2012 European Athletics Championships held in Helsinki, Finland, between 27 June to 1 July 2012.

== Medals ==
Medal	Name	Event	Date
Gold	Pavel Maslák	Men's 400 metres	29 June
Gold	Vítězslav Veselý	Men's javelin throw	28 June
Gold	Jiřina Ptáčníková	Women's pole vault	30 June
Silver	Denisa Rosolová	Women's 400 metres hurdles	29 June
Bronze	Jitka Bartoničková; Denisa Rosolová; Zuzana Bergrová; Zuzana Hejnová	Women's 4 × 400 metres relay	1 July

== Results ==
=== Men ===
==== Track ====
Event	Athletes	Heats		Semifinal		Final	
Event	Athletes	Result	Rank	Result	Rank	Result	Rank
100 m	Rostislav Šulc	10.53	21 q	10.60	22	did not advance	
100 m	Jan Veleba	10.48	19 Q	10.60	22	did not advance	
200 m	Vojtěch Šulc	21.17	20 q	DQ		did not advance	
400 m	Daniel Němeček	46.61	16 Q	DQ		did not advance	
400 m	Pavel Maslák	45.87	3 Q	45.66	1 Q	45.24	1st place, gold medalist(s)
400 m	Jan Tesař	46.75	19 q	47.27	20	did not advance	
800 m	Jakub Holuša	1:48.54	25 Q	1:46.63	3 q	1:48.99	5
800 m	Jan Kubista	1:47.66	12 q	1:48.94	17	did not advance	
400 m hurdles	Václav Barák	50.58	12 Q	50.33	15	did not advance	
400 m hurdles	Michal Brož	50.91	18 q	51.35	21	did not advance	
400 m hurdles	Josef Prorok	50.57	11 Q	DQ		did not advance	
4 × 100 m relay	Jan Veleba; Rostislav Šulc; Vojtěch Šulc; Lukás Štastný	39.52	7 q	—N/a		DNF	
4 × 400 m relay	Daniel Němeček; Pavel Maslák; Josef Prorok; Jakub Holuša	3:05.41	2 Q	—N/a		3:02.72	5

==== Field ====
Event	Athletes	Qualification		Final	
Event	Athletes	Result	Rank	Result	Rank
Long jump	Roman Novotný	7.80	19	did not advance	
Long jump	Štěpán Wagner	7.80	18	did not advance	
High jump	Jaroslav Bába	2.23	3 Q	2.24	8
Pole vault	Jan Kudlička	5.50	4 q	5.60	6
Shot put	Ladislav Prášil	18.87	19	did not advance	
Shot put	Antonín Žalský	19.94	3 q	19.94	6
Javelin throw	Petr Frydrych	68.88	27	did not advance	
Javelin throw	Vítězslav Veselý	79.09	10 q	83.72	1st place, gold medalist(s)
Hammer throw	Lukáš Melich	68.92	28	did not advance	

==== Combined ====
Decathlon	Event	Adam Helcelet		
Decathlon	Event	Results	Points	Rank
	100 m	10.96	870	7
	Long jump	7.30	886	7
	Shot put	13.99	728	11
	High jump	2.03	831	2
	400 m	49.98	816	18
	110 m hurdles	14.24	944	3
	Discus	39.12	647	17
	Pole vault	4.80	849	7
	Javelin	61.66	763	4
	1500 m	4:42.55	664	14
Final			7998	8

Decathlon	Event	Roman Šebrle		
Decathlon	Event	Results	Points	Rank
	100 m	11.19	819	19
	Long jump	7.43	918	3
	Shot put	14.65	768	5
	High jump	2.00	803	3
	400 m	49.87	821	14
	110 m hurdles	14.45	917	6
	Discus	44.05	747	4
	Pole vault	4.90	880	5
	Javelin	61.78	765	3
	1500 m	4:50.74	614	16
Final			8052	6

=== Women ===
==== Track ====
Event	Athletes	Heats		Semifinal		Final	
Event	Athletes	Result	Rank	Result	Rank	Result	Rank
100 m	Kateřina Čechová	11.53	15 q	11.45	12	did not advance	
200 m	Kateřina Čechová	23.78	21 q	23.64	16	did not advance	
400 m	Jitka Bartoničková	53.15	12 Q	52.78	12	did not advance	
800 m	Lenka Masná	2:05.75	16	—N/a		did not advance	
1500 m	Lenka Masná	4:10.22	5 q	—N/a		4:10.17	7
100 m hurdles	Lucie Škrobáková	13.17	15 Q	13.17	9	did not advance	
400 m hurdles	Zuzana Bergrová	56.59	14 Q	55.78	7 q	56.26	7
400 m hurdles	Zuzana Hejnová	55.24	1 Q	55.36	5 Q	54.49	4
400 m hurdles	Denisa Rosolová	55.98	6 Q	54.71	3 Q	54.24	2nd place, silver medalist(s)
4 × 400 m relay	Jitka Bartoničková; Denisa Rosolová; Zuzana Bergrová; Zuzana Hejnová	3:30.86	4 Q	—N/a		3:26.02	3rd place, bronze medalist(s)

==== Field ====
Event	Athletes	Qualification		Final	
Event	Athletes	Result	Rank	Result	Rank
High jump	Oldřiška Marešová	1.83	17	did not advance	
Pole vault	Romana Malácová	4.25	18	did not advance	
Pole vault	Jiřina Ptáčníková	4.45	1 Q	4.60	1st place, gold medalist(s)
Discus throw	Věra Cechlová	57.52	11 q	60.08	7
Discus throw	Jitka Kubelová	51.71	23	did not advance	
Discus throw	Eliška Staňková	55.22	13	did not advance	
Hammer throw	Kateřina Šafránková	66.51	14	did not advance	
Hammer throw	Tereza Králová	66.89	12 q	65.87	12

==== Combined ====
Heptathlon	Event	Eliška Klučinová		
Heptathlon	Event	Results	Points	Rank
	100 m hurdles	14.03	974	14
	High jump	1.83	1016	2
	Shot Put	14.21	808	5
	200 m	24.56	928	10
	Long jump	6.09	877	12
	Javelin throw	42.58	717	10
	800 m	2:19.47	831	12
Final			6151	8
