= Belarus at the 2012 European Athletics Championships =

Belarus competed at the 2012 European Athletics Championships held in Helsinki, Finland, between 27 June to 1 July 2012.

== Medals ==
Medal	Name	Event	Date
Silver	Alina Talay	Women's 100 metres hurdles	30 June
Silver	Volha Sudarava	Women's long jump	28 June
Bronze	Aliaksei Tsapik	Men's triple jump	30 June
Bronze	Ilona Usovich	Women's 400 metres	29 June
Bronze	Katsiaryna Paplauskaya	Women's 100 metres hurdles	30 June

== Results ==
=== Men ===
==== Track ====
Event	Athletes	Heats		Semifinal		Final	
Event	Athletes	Result	Rank	Result	Rank	Result	Rank
200 m	Aliaksandr Linnik	21.20	21 q	21.43	20	did not advance	
1500 m	Siarhei Krylou	3:46.93	19	—		did not advance	
110 m hurdles	Maksim Lynsha	13.75	18 q	13.58	13	did not advance	
400 m hurdles	Mikita Yakauleu	50.47	10 Q	50.02	11	did not advance	

==== Field ====
Event	Athletes	Qualification		Final	
Event	Athletes	Result	Rank	Result	Rank
Triple jump	Dzmitry Platnitski	16.47	11 q	16.68	7
Triple jump	Aliaksei Tsapik	16.95	3 Q	16.97	3rd place, bronze medalist(s)
Pole vault	Stanislau Tsivonchyk	5.30	12 q	NM	–
Hammer throw	Pavel Kryvitski	74.39	5 q	73.67	9
Hammer throw	Yury Shayunou	72.18	17	did not advance	
Hammer throw	Valeriy Sviatokha	73.01	11 q	75.83	4

==== Combined ====
Decathlon	Event	Mikalai Shubianok		
Decathlon	Event	Results	Points	Rank
	100 m	11.34	786	24
	Long jump	7.08	833	16
	Shot put	15.37	812	2
	High jump	2.00	803	3
	400 m	50.27	802	20
	110 m hurdles	14.57	902	7
	Discus	43.80	742	5
	Pole vault	4.70	819	12
	Javelin	58.51	715	6
	1500 m	4:31.56	734	7
Final			7948	9

=== Women ===
==== Track ====
Event	Athletes	Heats		Semifinal		Final	
Event	Athletes	Result	Rank	Result	Rank	Result	Rank
100 m	Yuliya Balykina	11.39	7 Q	11.42	9	did not advance	
100 m	Yulia Nestsiarenka	11.52	14 q	DNS		did not advance	
400 m	Ilona Usovich	51.98	1 Q	52.10	6 Q	51.94	3rd place, bronze medalist(s)
800 m	Maryna Arzamasava	2:00.54	1 Q	—		2:01.02	4
100 m hurdles	Katsiaryna Paplauskaya	12.97	3 Q	13.03	2 Q	12.97	3rd place, bronze medalist(s)
100 m hurdles	Alina Talay	12.93	2 Q	13.03	2 Q	12.91	2nd place, silver medalist(s)
3000 m steeplechase	Sviatlana Kudzelich	DQ		—		did not advance	
4 × 100 m relay	Volha Astashka; Katsiaryna Hanchar; Elena Danilyuk-Nevmerzhytskaya; Yuliya Balykina	43.69	7 q	—		44.06	7
4 × 400 m relay	Maryna Boika; Iryna Khliustava; Yulia Yurenya; Ilona Usovich	3:31.50	8	—		did not advance	

==== Field ====
Event	Athletes	Qualification		Final	
Event	Athletes	Result	Rank	Result	Rank
Long jump	Volha Sudarava	6.44	7 q	6.74	2nd place, silver medalist(s)
Triple jump	Kseniya Dziatsuk	14.20	8 Q	13.87	12
Pole vault	Anastasiya Shvedova	4.40	5 q	4.40	9
Hammer throw	Alina Kastrova	62.51	21	did not advance	
