= Elena Romagnolo =

Italian runner

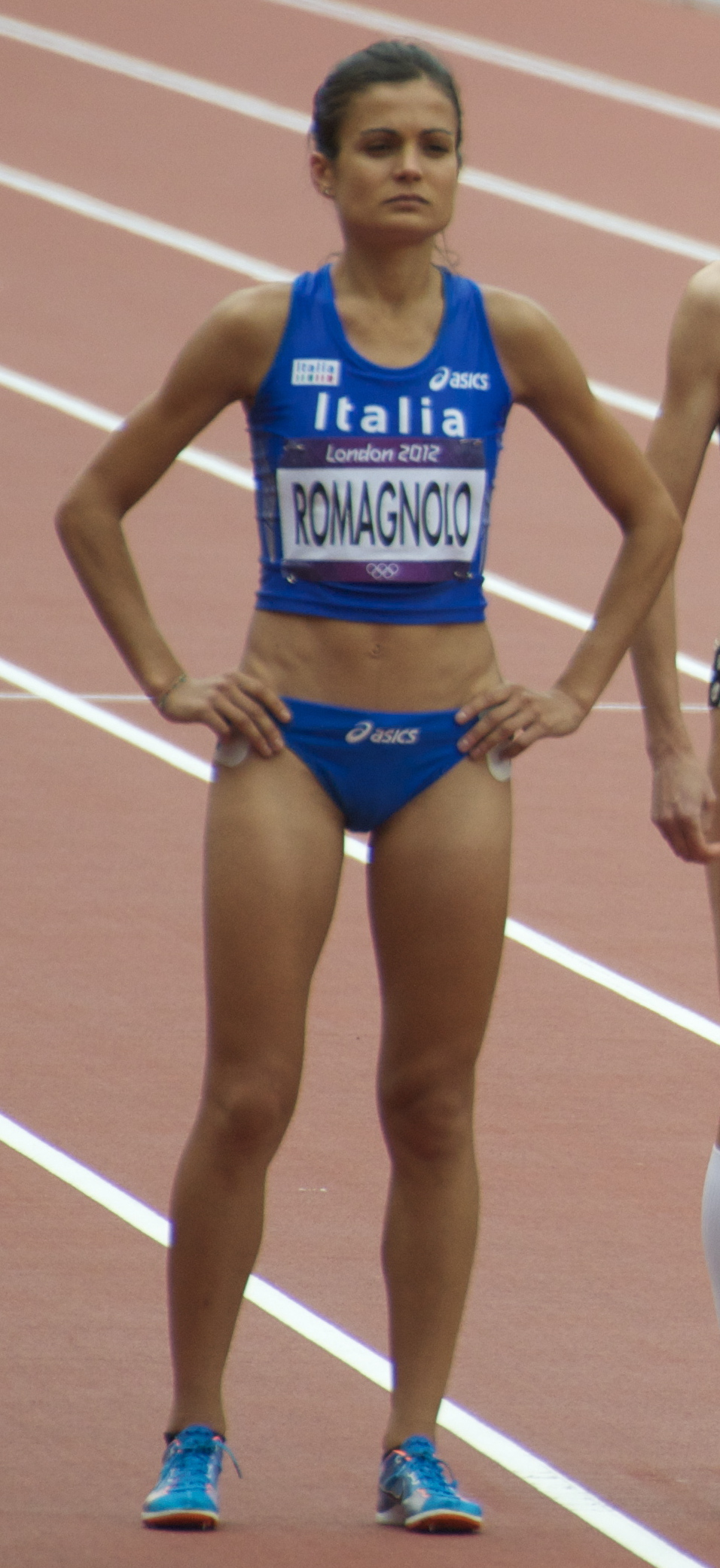
- Elena Romagnolo at the 2012 Summer Olympics

Personal information
- Nationality: Italian
- Born: 5 October 1982 (age 43) Borgosesia, Italy
- Height: 1.65 m (5 ft 5 in)
- Weight: 50 kg (110 lb)

Sport
- Country: Italy
- Sport: Athletics
- Events: Steeplechase; Running
- Club: C.S. Esercito
- Coached by: Andrea Bello

Achievements and titles
- Personal best: 3000 m st: 9:27.48 (2008)
Medal record
Event	1st	2nd	3rd
Mediterranean Games	0	1	1

Elena Romagnolo (born 5 October 1982 in Borgosesia) is an Italian steeplechaser, middle and long-distance runner. She is the national record holder in the 3000 metres steeplechase, but now competes mainly in the 5000 metres.

== Biography ==
She first established herself as a steeplechase runner, taking back-to-back national titles in 2006 and 2007. She represented her country in that event at the 2006 European Athletics Championships, the 2007 World Championships in Athletics and the 2008 Summer Olympics. At the latter event she ran an Italian record of 9:27.48 minutes in the heats and finished eleventh in the final. Her final global appearance in the steeplechase came at the 2009 World Championships in Athletics, where she did not progress beyond the heats.

Romagnolo has been a frequent representative for Italy in cross country running, having competed at the IAAF World Cross Country Championships in 2007, 2008, 2010 and 2011. Her best finish came in 2010 in Bydgoszcz, where she placed 24th overall. She was tenth at the 2008 European Cross Country Championships. She participated at two editions of the Summer Olympics (2008, 2012), she has 22 caps in national team from 2006 to 2012.

Since 2009, she began to turn her attention to flat running rather than the steeplechase. She placed sixth in the 5000 metres final at the 2010 European Athletics Championships and was the silver medallist at the 2009 Mediterranean Games in Pescara (running a personal best of 15:13.19 minutes). Romagnolo did not perform well in the 2011 season but she showed a return to form at the Cinque Mulini in March 2012, where she was runner-up to Kenya's Priscah Jepleting. At the 2012 Summer Olympics, she reached the final of the women's 5000 metres.

== National records ==
- 3000 metres steeplechase: 9:27:48 ( (China) Beijing, 15 August 2008) - Current holder

== Achievements ==
Year	Competition	Venue	Position	Event	Notes
2006	European Championships	Gothenburg, Sweden	19th	3000 m steeplechase	9:52.38
2007	World Championships	Osaka, Japan	21st	3000 m steeplechase	9:52.38
2008	Summer Olympics	Beijing, China	11th	3000 m steeplechase	9:30.04
2009	Mediterranean Games	Pescara, Italy	2nd	5000 m	15:13.19
2009	World Championships	Berlin, Germany	38th	3000 m steeplechase	9:56.61
2010	European Championships	Barcelona, Spain	5th	5000 m	15:14.40
2012	European Championships	Helsinki, Finland	9th	5000 m	15:24.38
2012	European Championships	Helsinki, Finland	8th	10,000 m	32:42.31
2012	Summer Olympics	London, Great Britain	15th	5000 m	15:39.69
2013	Mediterranean Games	Mersin, Turkey	3rd	5000 m	16:11.17

== National titles ==
She won 7 times the individual national championship.

- 3 wins in the 3000 metres steeplechase track (2005, 2007, 2007)
- 1 win in the 1500 metres (2009)
- 1 win in the 5000 metres (2008)
- 1 win in the cross country running (2010)
- 1 win in the 3000 metres indoor (2009)

== See also ==
- Italian records in athletics
- Italian all-time lists - 3000 metres steeplechase
- Italian all-time lists - 1500 metres
- Italian all-time lists - 5000 metres
