= Irina Maracheva =

Russian middle-distance runner

Personal information
- Full name: Irina Maracheva
- Born: 29 September 1984 (age 41)

Sport
- Country: Russia
- Sport: Athletics
- Event: Running

Irina Maracheva (born 29 September 1984) is a Russian athlete who competes in middle-distance running events. She has a personal best time of 1:57.82 minutes at the 800 metres.

Maracheva won the bronze medal at the 2012 European Athletics Championships in Helsinki at the 800 metres event.

On 25 January 2016 it was announced that she had been banned from competition for doping for 2 years by the Russian Olympic Committee.

== Competition record ==
Year	Competition	Venue	Position	Event	Notes
Representing Russia
2009	Universiade	Belgrade, Serbia	8th	800 m	2:05.15
2009	Universiade	Belgrade, Serbia	8th	1500 m	4:20.05
2012	European Championships	Helsinki, Finland	3rd	800 m	2:00.66
2014	IAAF World Relays	Nassau, Bahamas	3rd	4 × 800 m	8:08.19
