= Marcell Deák-Nagy =

Hungarian sprinter

Personal information
- Nationality: Hungary
- Born: 28 January 1992 (age 34)

Sport
- Sport: Running
- Event(s): 200 metres, 400 metres

Achievements and titles
- Personal best(s): 200 m: 22.03 s (Budapest 2009); 400 m: 45.42 s (Tallinn 2011)
Medal record
Representing Hungary
Men's athletics
European Athletics Championships
Silver medal – second place	2012 Helsinki	400 m
World Junior Championships
Silver medal – second place	2010 Moncton	400 m
European Junior Championships
Gold medal – first place	2011 Tallinn	400 m
Summer Universiade
Gold medal – first place	2011 Shenzhen	400 m

Marcell Deák-Nagy (born 28 January 1992) is a Hungarian sprinter who specialises in the 200 and 400 metres.

At the 2010 World Junior Championships in Athletics in Moncton, Canada, Deák-Nagy won a silver medal over 400 metres.

At the 2012 European Athletics Championships in Helsinki, Finland, he won a silver medal over 400 metres.

== Personal best ==
Distance	Time	venue
200 m	22.03 s	Budapest, Hungary (30 May 2009)
400 m	45.42 s	Tallinn, Estonia (22 July 2011)
