= 2012 European Athletics Championships – Women's 800 metres =

Women's 800 metres at the European Athletics Championships
- Venue: Helsinki Olympic Stadium
- Location: Helsinki, Finland
- Dates: 28 June 2012 (round 1); 29 June 2012 (final)
- Competitors: 18 from 14 nations
- Winning time: 2:00.52 min

Medalists
gold medal	Lynsey Sharp	Great Britain
silver medal	Maryna Arzamasava	Belarus
bronze medal	Liliya Lobanova	Ukraine

The women's 800 metres at the 2012 European Athletics Championships was held over two rounds at the Helsinki Olympic Stadium in Helsinki, Finland, on 28 and 29 June 2012.

== Background ==
Records before the 2012 European Athletics Championships
Record	Athlete (nation)	Time	Location	Date
World record	Jarmila Kratochvílová (TCH)	1:53.28	Munich, West Germany	26 July 1983
European record	Jarmila Kratochvílová (TCH)	1:53.28	Munich, West Germany	26 July 1983
Championship record	Olga Mineyeva (URS)	1:55.41	Athens, Greece	8 September 1982
World leading	Pamela Jelimo (KEN)	1:56.94	Doha, Qatar	11 May 2012
European Leading	Irina Maracheva (RUS)	1:57.82	Sochi, Russia	27 May 2012

== Results ==
=== Round 1 ===
On 28 June 2012, seventeen athletes from fourteen nations cometed in the three heats of round 1, starting at 19:05 (UTC+3). Eight athletes, the first two in each heat (Q) and the two next fastest overall (q), qualified for the final.

Results of round 1
Rank	Heat	Lane	Athlete	Nation	Time	Note
1	2	6	Maryna Arzamasava	Belarus	2:00.54	Q
DQ	1	7	Elena Arzhakova	Russia	~~2:01.28~~	Q, Doping
3	2	3	Liliya Lobanova	Ukraine	2:01.60	Q
4	2	7	Jemma Simpson	Great Britain & N.I.	2:01.64	q
5	1	4	Lynsey Sharp	Great Britain & N.I.	2:01.88	Q
6	1	6	Natalija Piliušina	Lithuania	2:02.12	q, PB
7	2	4	Eléni Filándra	Greece	2:02.37	
8	1	3	Teodora Kolarova	Bulgaria	2:02.45	
DQ	3	4	Irina Maracheva	Russia	~~2:02.48~~	Q, Doping
10	3	5	Lucia Klocová	Slovakia	2:02.55	Q
11	3	8	Merve Aydın	Turkey	2:02.81	
DQ	1	2	Tetiana Petlyuk	Ukraine	~~2:04.09~~	Doping
12	3	6	Ewelina Sętowska-Dryk	Poland	2:04.30	
13	2	2	Eglė Balčiūnaitė	Lithuania	2:05.21	
14	2	5	Viktoria Tegenfeldt	Sweden	2:05.74	
15	3	7	Lenka Masná	Czech Republic	2:05.75	
16	3	3	Suvi Selvenius	Finland	2:06.39	SB
17	1	5	Elena Mirela Lavric	Romania	2:11.61	
	3	2	Jenny Meadows	Great Britain & N.I.	DNS	

- Elena Arzhakova originally ranked second, prior to disqualification. Irina Maracheva originally ranked ninth, prior to disqualification

=== Final ===
On 29 June 2012, eight athletes from six nations competed in the final at 21:45 (UTC+3).

Results of the final
Rank	Lane	Althere	Nation	Time	Note
DQ	2	Elena Arzhakova	Russia	~~1:58.51~~	Doping
1st place, gold medalist(s)	5	Lynsey Sharp	Great Britain & N.I.	2:00.52	PB
DQ	1	Irina Maracheva	Russia	~~2:00.66~~	Doping
2nd place, silver medalist(s)	3	Maryna Arzamasava	Belarus	2:01.02	
3rd place, bronze medalist(s)	4	Liliya Lobanova	Ukraine	2:01.29	
4	6	Lucia Klocová	Slovakia	2:01.38	
5	8	Jemma Simpson	Great Britain & N.I.	2:02.14	
6	7	Natalija Piliušina	Lithuania	2:06.59	

== Disqualifications for doping violations ==
On 30 April 2013, it was announced that the original winner of the gold medal, Elena Arzhakova had been suspended for two years from January 2013 for a doping violation, and was to be stripped of all results gained since July 11, 2011. When ratified, this would mean Arzhakova being stripped of her gold medal, which would then be awarded to Lynsey Sharp. Irina Maracheva and Maryna Arzamasava would also each be awarded an upgraded medal.

On 4 June 2013, this reallocation of medals was confirmed, and Lynsey Sharp declared European champion.

On 25 January 2016, it was announced that the new silver medalist, Irina Maracheva had also been found guilty of doping changes as a result of her blood passport. As a result, in due course Maracheva will be stripped of her result, Arzamasava promoted again, this time into silver and Lilyia Lobanova, original placed fifth, will be awarded the bronze medal.
