= Leena Günther =

German sprinter (born 1991)

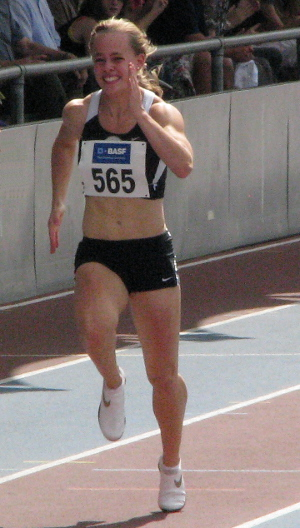
- Leena Günther in 2011

Personal information
- Full name: Leena Günther
- Born: 16 April 1991 (age 35) Cologne, Germany

Sport
- Country: Germany
- Sport: Athletics
- Event(s): 100 metres, 200 metres

Achievements and titles
- Regional finals: 1st at the 2012 European Athletics Championships
- Personal bests: 100 m: 11.33; 200 m: 24.04
Medal record
Athletics
European Athletics Championships
Gold medal – first place	2012 Helsinki	4 × 100 m relay

Leena Günther (born 16 April 1991 in Cologne) is a German athlete who competes in the sprint with a personal best time of 11.33 seconds in the 100 metres event.

Günther won the gold medal at the 2012 European Athletics Championships – Women's 4 × 100 metres relay in Helsinki. That year, she was also part of the German 4 × 100 m women's team which finished 5th in the final at the Olympic Games. She has also competed at the 2010 World Junior Championships in Athletics.
