= Arne Gabius =

German long-distance runner (born 1981)

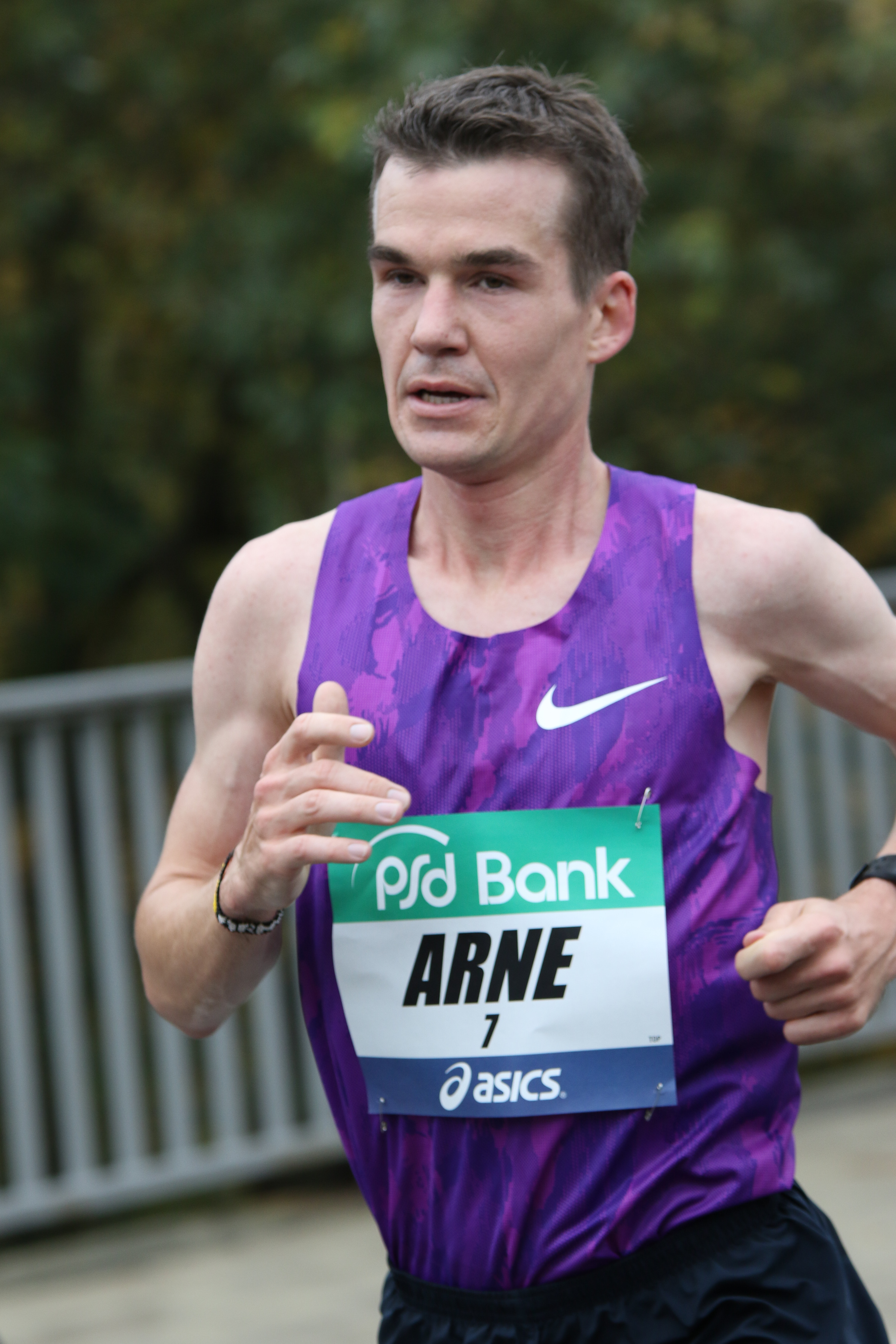
- Gabius in 2015

Personal information
- Born: 22 March 1981 (age 45) Hamburg, Germany
- Height: 186 cm (6 ft 1 in)
- Weight: 66 kg (146 lb)

Sport
- Country: Germany
- Sport: Athletics
- Event(s): 5000 m, 10,000 m, Marathon
- Club: LAV Tübingen
Medal record
European Championships
Silver medal – second place	2012 Helsinki	5000 m

Arne Gabius (born 22 March 1981 in Hamburg) is a German long distance runner. From 2015 until 2023, he was the men's German national record holder in the marathon with his time of 2 hours 08 minutes and 33 seconds.

== International competitions ==
Representing Germany
Year	Competition	Venue	Position	Event	Notes
2006	European Championships	Gothenburg, Sweden	–	5000 m	DNF
2007	European Indoor Championships	Birmingham, United Kingdom	9th	3000 m	8:08.51
2008	World Indoor Championships	Valencia, Spain	12th	3000 m	8:11.21
2009	World Championships	Berlin, Germany	28th (h)	5000 m	13:49.13
2010	European Championships	Barcelona, Spain	12th	5000 m	13:59.11
2012	World Indoor Championships	Istanbul, Turkey	8th	3000 m	7:45.01
2012	European Championships	Helsinki, Finland	2nd	5000 m	13:31.83
2012	Olympic Games	London, United Kingdom	20th (h)	5000 m	13:28.01
2013	World Championships	Moscow, Russia	28th (h)	5000 m	13:34.26
2014	European Championships	Zürich, Switzerland	7th	5000 m	14:11.84
2015	World Championships	Beijing, China	17th	10,000 m	28:24.47
2015	Frankfurt Marathon	Frankfurt, Germany	4th	Marathon	2:08:33
2016	European Championships	Amsterdam, Netherlands	–	Half marathon	DNF
