= 2012 European Athletics Championships =

21st European Athletics Championships
- Dates: 27 June – 1 July
- Host city: Helsinki, Finland
- Venue: Helsinki Olympic Stadium
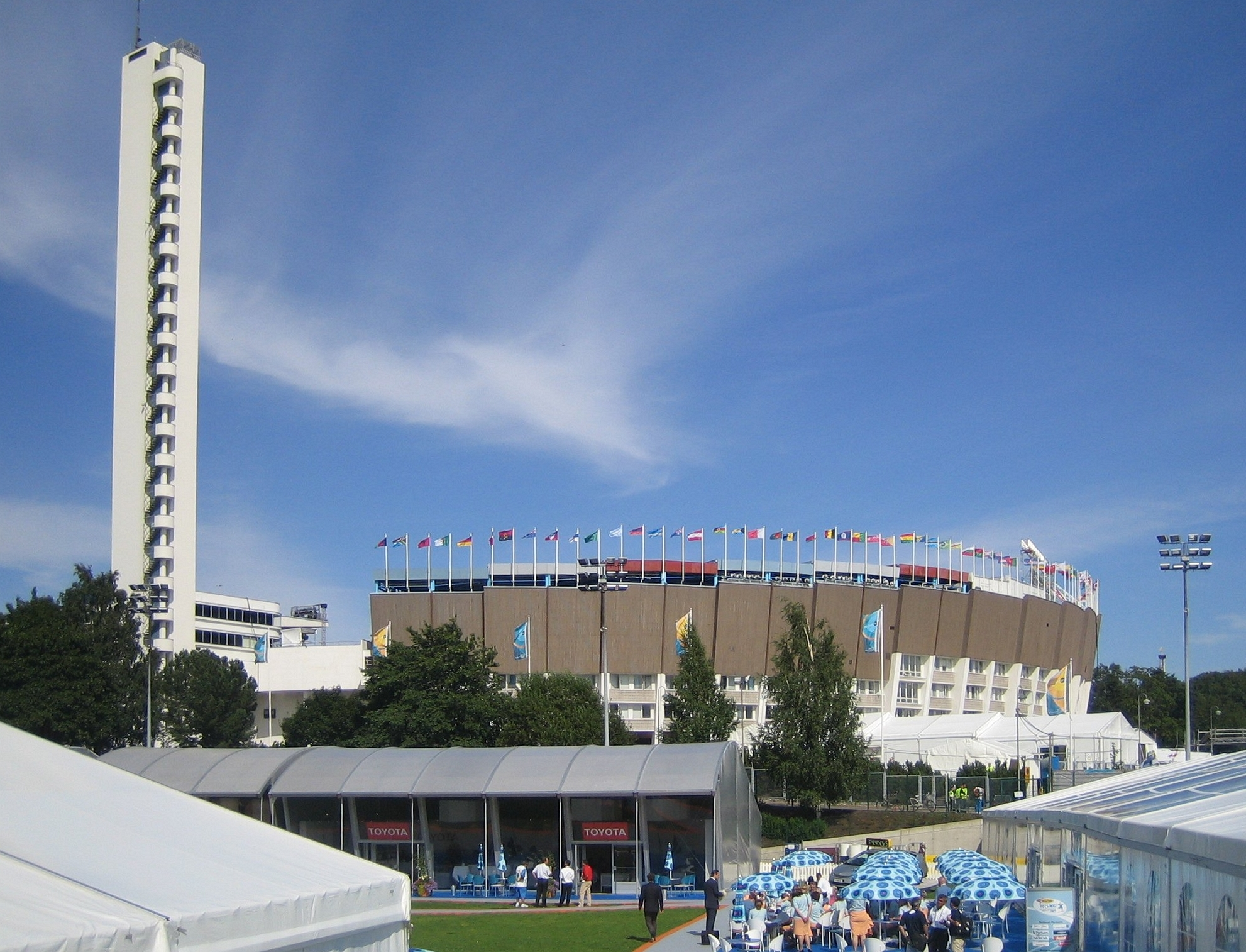
- Level: Senior
- Type: Outdoor
- Events: 42 (21 men, 21 women)
- Participation: 50 nations

The 2012 European Athletics Championships were held in Helsinki, Finland between 27 June and 1 July 2012. This edition marks the beginning of a new two-year cycle of the European Athletics Championships which were previously held every four years.

The decision to grant the games for Helsinki was made by the European Athletics Congress on 9 November 2009. Another city that showed interest in hosting the event was Nuremberg, Germany, however Helsinki was in pole position during the whole process. This was the third time that the city had hosted the event, 1971 and 1994 being the other occasions.

Due to 2012 being an Olympic year, there were no racewalking and marathon competitions.

== Event schedule ==
Legend
Key	P	Q	H	½	F
Value	Preliminary round	Qualifiers	Heats	Semifinals	Final

Men
Date	Jun 27		Jun 28		Jun 29		Jun 30		Jul 1	
Event	M	A	M	A	M	A	M	A	A	
100 m	H	½		F						
200 m					H	½		F		
400 m	H			½		F				
800 m	H			½		F				
1500 m							H		F	
5000 m		F								
10,000 m								F		
110 m hurdles							H		½	F
400 m hurdles	H		½			F				
3000 m steeplechase		H				F				
4 × 100 m relay							H		F	
4 × 400 m relay								H	F	
Long jump					Q				F	
Triple jump			Q					F		
High jump		Q				F				
Pole vault							Q		F	
Shot put	Q					F				
Discus throw					Q			F		
Hammer throw			Q					F		
Javelin throw		Q		F						
Decathlon	F									

Women
Date	Jun 27		Jun 28		Jun 29		Jun 30			Jul 1
Event ↓	M	A	M	A	M	A	M	A		A
100 m	H	½		F						
200 m					H	½		F		
400 m		H		½		F				
800 m				H		F				
1500 m							H			F
5000 m				F						
10,000 m										F
100 m hurdles					H			½	F	
400 m hurdles	H		½			F				
3000 m steeplechase			H					F		
4 × 100 m relay							H			F
4 × 400 m relay								H		F
Long jump	Q			F						
Triple jump	Q					F				
High jump	Q			F						
Pole vault			Q					F		
Shot put			Q			F				
Discus throw							Q			F
Hammer throw					Q					F
Javelin throw	Q					F				
Heptathlon					F					

== Men's results ==
=== Track ===
Chronology: 2006 | 2010 | 2012 | 2014 | 2016

Event	Gold		Silver		Bronze	
100 metres	Christophe Lemaitre; France (FRA)	10.09	Jimmy Vicaut; France (FRA)	10.12 SB	Jaysuma Saidy Ndure; Norway (NOR)	10.17
200 metres	Churandy Martina; Netherlands (NED)	20.42	Patrick van Luijk; Netherlands (NED)	20.87	Danny Talbot; Great Britain & N.I. (GBR)	20.95
400 metres	Pavel Maslák; Czech Republic (CZE)	45.24	Marcell Deák-Nagy; Hungary (HUN)	45.52 SB	Yannick Fonsat; France (FRA)	45.82
800 metres	Yuriy Borzakovskiy; Russia (RUS)	1:48.61	Andreas Bube; Denmark (DEN)	1:48.69	Pierre-Ambroise Bosse; France (FRA)	1:48.83
1500 metres	Henrik Ingebrigtsen; Norway (NOR)	3:46.20	Florian Carvalho; France (FRA)	3:46.33	David Bustos; Spain (ESP)	3:46.45
5000 metres	Mo Farah; Great Britain & N.I. (GBR)	13:29.91	Arne Gabius; Germany (GER)	13:31.83	Polat Kemboi Arıkan; Turkey (TUR)	13:32.63
10,000 metres	Polat Kemboi Arıkan; Turkey (TUR)	28:22.27	Daniele Meucci; Italy (ITA)	28:22.73	Yevgeniy Rybakov; Russia (RUS)	28:22.95 SB
110 metres hurdles	Sergey Shubenkov; Russia (RUS)	13.16	Garfield Darien; France (FRA)	13.20	Artur Noga; Poland (POL)	13.27 NR
400 metres hurdles	Rhys Williams; Great Britain & N.I. (GBR)	49.33 SB	Emir Bekrić; Serbia (SRB)	49.49	Stanislav Melnykov; Ukraine (UKR)	49.69
3000 metres steeplechase	Mahiedine Mekhissi-Benabbad; France (FRA)	8:33.29	Tarık Langat Akdağ; Turkey (TUR)	8:35.24	Víctor García; Spain (ESP)	8:35.87
4 × 100 metres relay	Netherlands; Brian Mariano; Churandy Martina; Giovanni Codrington; Patrick van Luijk	38.34 EL, NR	Germany; Julian Reus; Tobias Unger; Alexander Kosenkow; Lucas Jakubczyk	38.44	France; Ronald Pognon; Christophe Lemaitre; Pierre-Alexis Pessonneaux; Emmanuel Biron	38.46
4 × 400 metres relay	Belgium; Antoine Gillet; Jonathan Borlée; Jente Bouckaert; Kévin Borlée	3:01.09 EL	Great Britain & N.I. Nigel Levine; Conrad Williams; Robert Tobin; Richard Buck	3:01.56	Germany; Jonas Plass; Kamghe Gaba; Eric Krüger; Thomas Schneider	3:01.77
WR world record | AR area record | CR championship record | GR games record | NR national record | OR Olympic record | PB personal best | SB season best | WL world leading (in a given season)

=== Field ===
Chronology: 2006 | 2010 | 2012 | 2014 | 2016

Event	Gold		Silver		Bronze	
High jump	Robert Grabarz; Great Britain & N.I. (GBR)	2.31	Raivydas Stanys; Lithuania (LTU)	2.31 PB	Mickaël Hanany; France (FRA)	2.28
Pole vault	Renaud Lavillenie; France (FRA)	5.97 WL	Björn Otto; Germany (GER)	5.92 PB	Raphael Holzdeppe; Germany (GER)	5.77 =SB
Long jump	Sebastian Bayer; Germany (GER)	8.34 SB	Luis Felipe Méliz; Spain (ESP)	8.21 SB	Michel Tornéus; Sweden (SWE)	8.17 SB
Triple jump	Fabrizio Donato; Italy (ITA)	17.63	Sheryf El-Sheryf; Ukraine (UKR)	17.28	Aliaksei Tsapik; Belarus (BLR)	16.97
Shot put	David Storl; Germany (GER)	21.58 SB	Rutger Smith; Netherlands (NED)	20.55 =SB	Asmir Kolašinac; Serbia (SRB)	20.36
Discus throw	Robert Harting; Germany (GER)	68.30	Gerd Kanter; Estonia (EST)	66.53	Rutger Smith; Netherlands (NED)	64.02
Javelin throw	Vítězslav Veselý; Czech Republic (CZE)	83.72	Valeriy Iordan; Russia (RUS)	83.32 PB	Ari Mannio; Finland (FIN)	82.63
Hammer throw	Krisztián Pars; Hungary (HUN)	79.72	Aleksey Zagornyi; Russia (RUS)	77.40	Szymon Ziółkowski; Poland (POL)	76.67
Decathlon	Pascal Behrenbruch; Germany (GER)	8558 EL, PB	Oleksiy Kasyanov; Ukraine (UKR)	8321	Ilya Shkurenyov; Russia (RUS)	8219 PB
WR world record | AR area record | CR championship record | GR games record | NR national record | OR Olympic record | PB personal best | SB season best | WL world leading (in a given season)

== Women's results ==
=== Track ===
Chronology: 2006 | 2010 | 2012 | 2014 | 2016

Event	Gold		Silver		Bronze	
100 metres	Ivet Lalova; Bulgaria (BUL)	11.28	Olesya Povh; Ukraine (UKR)	11.32	Lina Grinčikaitė; Lithuania (LTU)	11.32 SB
200 metres	Mariya Ryemyen; Ukraine (UKR)	23.05	Hrystyna Stuy; Ukraine (UKR)	23.17	Myriam Soumaré; France (FRA)	23.21
400 metres	Moa Hjelmer; Sweden (SWE)	51.13 NR	Ksenia Zadorina; Russia (RUS)	51.26 SB	Ilona Usovich; Belarus (BLR)	51.94
800 metres ≠1	Lynsey Sharp; Great Britain & N.I. (GBR)	2:00.52 PB	Maryna Arzamasava; Belarus (BLR)	2:01.02	Liliya Lobanova; Ukraine (UKR)	2:01.29
1500 metres ≠2	Nuria Fernández; Spain (ESP)	4:08.80	Diana Sujew; Germany (GER)	4:09.28	Tereza Čapková; Czech Republic (CZE)	4:10.17
5000 metres	Olga Golovkina; Russia (RUS)	15:11.70	Sara Moreira; Portugal (POR)	15:12.05	Julia Bleasdale; Great Britain & N.I. (GBR)	15:12.77
10,000 metres	Ana Dulce Félix; Portugal (POR)	31:44.75	Joanne Pavey; Great Britain & N.I. (GBR)	31:49.03	Olha Skrypak; Ukraine (UKR)	31:51.32
100 metres hurdles ≠3	Alina Talay; Belarus (BLR)	12.91	Katsiaryna Paplauskaya; Belarus (BLR)	12.97	Beate Schrott; Austria (AUT)	12.98 =SB
400 metres hurdles	Denisa Rosolová; Czech Republic (CZE)	54.24 PB	Hanna Yaroshchuk; Ukraine (UKR)	54.35 PB	Zuzana Hejnová; Czech Republic (CZE)	54.49
3000 metres steeplechase ≠4	Gülcan Mıngır; Turkey (TUR)	9:32.96	Antje Möldner-Schmidt; Germany (GER)	9:36.37	Gesa Felicitas Krause; Germany (GER)	9:38.20
4 × 100 metres relay	Germany; Leena Günther; Anne Cibis; Tatjana Lofamakanda Pinto; Verena Sailer	42.51 EL	Netherlands; Kadene Vassell; Dafne Schippers; Eva Lubbers; Jamile Samuel	42.80 NR	Poland; Marika Popowicz; Daria Korczyńska; Marta Jeschke; Ewelina Ptak	43.06
4 × 400 metres relay	Ukraine; Yuilya Olishevska; Olha Zemlyak; Nataliya Pyhyda; Alina Lohvynenko	3:25.07 EL	France; Phara Anacharsis; Lenora Guion Firmin; Marie Gayot; Floria Gueï	3:25.49	Czech Republic; Zuzana Hejnová; Zuzana Bergrová; Jitka Bartoničková; Denisa Rosolová	3:26.02
WR world record | AR area record | CR championship record | GR games record | NR national record | OR Olympic record | PB personal best | SB season best | WL world leading (in a given season)
≠ Doping : 1. Official result following disqualifications for Elena Arzhakova and Irina Maracheva (Russia) for doping violation. (Russia) .; 2. Official result following disqualification for Aslı Çakır Alptekin (Turkey) , Yekaterina Ishova (Russia) , Gamze Bulut (Turkey) and Anna Mishchenko (Ukraine) for doping violations.; 3. Official result following disqualification for Nevin Yanıt (Turkey) for doping violation.; 4. Official result following disqualification for Svitlana Shmidt (Ukraine) for doping violation.

=== Field ===
Chronology: 2006 | 2010 | 2012 | 2014 | 2016

Event	Gold		Silver		Bronze	
High jump	Ruth Beitia; Spain (ESP)	1.97 =SB	Tonje Angelsen; Norway (NOR)	1.97 PB	Irina Gordeeva; Russia (RUS); Emma Green Tregaro; Sweden (SWE); Olena Holosha; Ukraine (UKR)	1.92
Pole vault	Jiřina Ptáčníková; Czech Republic (CZE)	4.60	Martina Strutz; Germany (GER)	4.60 SB	Nikoleta Kyriakopoulou; Greece (GRE)	4.60 =SB
Long jump	Éloyse Lesueur; France (FRA)	6.81 SB	Volha Sudarava; Belarus (BLR)	6.74	Margrethe Renstrøm; Norway (NOR)	6.67
Triple jump	Olha Saladukha; Ukraine (UKR)	14.99 WL	Patrícia Mamona; Portugal (POR)	14.52 NR	Yana Borodina; Russia (RUS)	14.36
Shot put	Nadine Kleinert; Germany (GER)	19.18	Irina Tarasova; Russia (RUS)	18.91	Chiara Rosa; Italy (ITA)	18.47
Discus throw	Sandra Perković; Croatia (CRO)	67.62	Nadine Müller; Germany (GER)	65.41	Natalya Semenova; Ukraine (UKR)	62.91
Javelin throw	Vira Rebryk; Ukraine (UKR)	66.86 NR	Christina Obergföll; Germany (GER)	65.12	Linda Stahl; Germany (GER)	63.69
Hammer throw	Anita Włodarczyk; Poland (POL)	74.29	Martina Hrašnová; Slovakia (SVK)	73.34 SB	Anna Bulgakova; Russia (RUS)	71.47
Heptathlon	Antoinette Nana Djimou Ida; France (FRA)	6544 PB	Laura Ikauniece; Latvia (LAT)	6335 PB	Aiga Grabuste; Latvia (LAT)	6325 SB
WR world record | AR area record | CR championship record | GR games record | NR national record | OR Olympic record | PB personal best | SB season best | WL world leading (in a given season)

== Stripped medals ==
At the Championships 9 medals was stripped, 1 men and 8 women.

Event	Medal	Disqualified	Country	Variation date	Notes	New Podium	Original rank
Men's discus throw	3rd place, bronze medalist(s)	Zoltán Kővágó	Hungary	26 July 2012		(bronze) (Netherlands) Rutger Smith	4
Women's 800 m	1st place, gold medalist(s)	Elena Arzhakova	Russia	29 January 2013		(gold) (United Kingdom) Lynsey Sharp; (silver) (Belarus) Maryna Arzamasava; (bronze) (Ukraine) Liliya Lobanova	(silver); 4; 5
Women's 800 m	3rd place, bronze medalist(s)	Irina Maracheva	Russia	25 January 2016		(gold) (United Kingdom) Lynsey Sharp; (silver) (Belarus) Maryna Arzamasava; (bronze) (Ukraine) Liliya Lobanova	(silver); 4; 5
Women's 1500 m	1st place, gold medalist(s)	Aslı Çakır Alptekin	Turkey	17 August 2015		(gold) (Spain) Nuria Fernández; (silver) (Germany) Diana Sujew; (bronze) (Czech Republic) Tereza Čapková	5; 6; 7
Women's 1500 m	2nd place, silver medalist(s)	Gamze Bulut	Turkey	1 June 2016		(gold) (Spain) Nuria Fernández; (silver) (Germany) Diana Sujew; (bronze) (Czech Republic) Tereza Čapková	5; 6; 7
Women's 1500 m	3rd place, bronze medalist(s)	Anna Mishchenko	Ukraine	26 February 2016		(gold) (Spain) Nuria Fernández; (silver) (Germany) Diana Sujew; (bronze) (Czech Republic) Tereza Čapková	5; 6; 7
Women's 1500 m	4th	Yekaterina Ishova	Russia			(gold) (Spain) Nuria Fernández; (silver) (Germany) Diana Sujew; (bronze) (Czech Republic) Tereza Čapková	5; 6; 7
Women's 3000 m steeplechase	2nd place, silver medalist(s)	Svitlana Shmidt	Ukraine	12 April 2015		(silver) (Germany) Antje Möldner-Schmidt; (bronze) (Germany) Gesa Felicitas Krause	(bronze); 4
Women's 100 m hurdles	1st place, gold medalist(s)	Nevin Yanit	Turkey	29 August 2013		(gold) (Belarus) Alina Talay; (silver) (Belarus) Katsiaryna Paplauskaya; (bronze) (Austria) Beate Schrott	(silver) (bronze); 4
Women's heptathlon	2nd place, silver medalist(s)	Lyudmyla Yosypenko	Ukraine	30 December 2012		(silver) (Latvia) Laura Ikauniece; (bronze) (Latvia) Aiga Grabuste	(bronze); 4

== Medal table ==
* Host nation (Finland)

Rank	Nation	Gold	Silver	Bronze	Total
1	Germany	6	8	4	18
2	France	5	4	5	14
3	Ukraine	4	5	5	14
4	Great Britain & N.I.	4	2	2	8
5	Czech Republic	4	0	3	7
6	Russia	3	4	5	12
7	Netherlands	2	3	1	6
8	Spain	2	1	2	5
9	Turkey	2	1	1	4
10	Belarus	1	3	2	6
11	Portugal	1	2	0	3
12	Norway	1	1	2	4
13	Italy	1	1	1	3
14	Hungary	1	1	0	2
15	Poland	1	0	3	4
16	Sweden	1	0	2	3
17	Belgium	1	0	0	1
17	Bulgaria	1	0	0	1
17	Croatia	1	0	0	1
20	Latvia	0	1	1	2
20	Lithuania	0	1	1	2
20	Serbia	0	1	1	2
23	Denmark	0	1	0	1
23	Estonia	0	1	0	1
23	Slovakia	0	1	0	1
26	Austria	0	0	1	1
26	Finland*	0	0	1	1
26	Greece	0	0	1	1
Totals (28 entries)		42	42	44	128

== Participating nations ==
- Albania (3)
- Andorra (4)
- Armenia (5)
- Austria (9)
- Azerbaijan (4)
- Belarus (28)
- Belgium (22)
- Bosnia and Herzegovina (4)
- Bulgaria (26)
- Croatia (11)
- Cyprus (11)
- Czech Republic (43)
- Denmark (10)
- Estonia (21)
- Finland (53) (host)
- France (68)
- Georgia (5)
- Germany (88)
- Gibraltar (2)
- Great Britain & N.I. (73)
- Greece (24)
- Hungary (21)
- Iceland (5)
- Ireland (24)
- Israel (12)
- Italy (61)
- Latvia (22)
- Liechtenstein (1)
- Lithuania (24)
- Luxembourg (4)
- Macedonia (2)
- Malta (2)
- Moldova (6)
- Monaco (1)
- Montenegro (4)
- Netherlands (35)
- Norway (28)
- Poland (57)
- Portugal (37)
- Romania (28)
- Russia (69)
- San Marino (1)
- Serbia (11)
- Slovakia (12)
- Slovenia (19)
- Spain (70)
- Sweden (41)
- Switzerland (27)
- Turkey (44)
- Ukraine (70)

In brackets: Squad size

== Broadcasting ==
Territory	Rights holder
Belgium	VRT
Croatia	HRT; SPTV
Denmark	DR2
Estonia	ERR
Finland	Yle
France	France Télévisions; Eurosport
Germany	ARD; ZDF; Eurosport
Hungary	m2; Eurosport
Italy	Rai
Latvia	LTV
Lithuania	Eurosport
Poland	TVP Sport; Eurosport
Portugal	RTP; Eurosport
Serbia	RTS; Eurosport
Slovenia	RTV SLO
Spain	Teledeporte; Eurosport
Sweden	SVT
Turkey	TRT 3; Eurosport

== See also ==
- List of stripped European Athletics Championships medals
