= Julia Bleasdale =

British-born long-distance runner

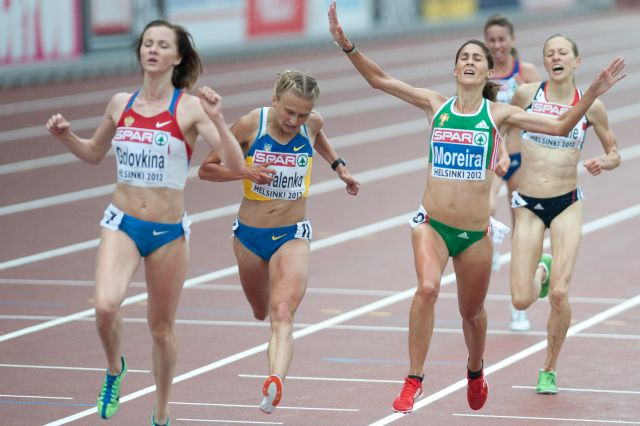
- Bleasdale (right) in the 5000 m final at the 2012 European Athletics Championships

Personal information
- Born: 9 September 1981 (age 44)

Sport
- Country: Germany/United Kingdom (Formerly)
- Sport: Athletics
- Event(s): 5000 metres, 10,000 metres
- Club: Hillingdon AC

Julia Bleasdale (born 9 September 1981) is a British-born long-distance runner, currently representing Germany internationally, who competes in the 5000 metres and 10,000 metres. She represented Great Britain at both distances in the London Olympics, placing eighth in both finals with a personal best time of 30:55.63 in the longer distance.

She also competed for Great Britain in cross country running and won the team gold at the 2011 European Cross Country Championships. She won the bronze medal in the 5000 m at the 2012 European Athletics Championships.

== Career ==
Born in Hillingdon, she competed in middle-distance events in her early years. Bleasdale began studying a degree in engineering at Cambridge University and it was during her time there that she gradually started to focus on longer distance races. In 2004, her final year at Cambridge, she won the British 10 km in London and represented Great Britain for the first time at the Chiba International Ekiden, where she ran a 5K leg of the relay.

She placed fourth at the Cursa Bombers in Spain in 2005 but competed infrequently in the following three years. She returned to the sport in 2009 and came 15th at the Great Manchester Run. In 2010, she focused on cross country instead. The move paid off in 2011 as she came fifth at the Inter-Counties Championships and gained selection for the 2011 IAAF World Cross Country Championships, where she placed 59th overall. She won the 5000 metres trials for the 2011 World Championships in Athletics, but was not selected as she had not achieved the qualifying time. She returned to international action at the 2011 European Cross Country Championships, where her eleventh-place finish brought her the team gold alongside Gemma Steel and Freya Murray.

The 2012 season saw Bleasdale break through in track events. Having started training with Australian coach Nic Bideau in late 2011, she ran a personal best of 31:29.57 minutes for the 10,000 metres at the Payton Jordan Cardinal Invitational, raising her to fifth on the British all-time lists. She placed third in the 5000 m British Olympic trials and came fourth in the event at the 2012 European Athletics Championships. Several years later, her result was upgraded to bronze, following disqualifications for doping.

Having been selected for both long-distance track events at the 2012 London Olympics, she ran two personal bests of 15:02.00 minutes and 30:55.63 minutes and placed eighth in the finals of both 5000 m and 10,000 m events. She ended the year with races on the IAAF Diamond League circuit and made a 10-mile debut at the Great South Run, finishing the distance in 55:35 minutes.

In April 2013 she came third at the Great Ireland Run, completing a British sweep behind Lauren Howarth and Gemma Steel.

Bleasdale started the 2014 season in good form, winning the Carlsbad 5000 road race in a time of 15:06 minutes, but injury would prevent her from competing in either the Commonwealth Games or European Championships that year.

In March 2016, Bleasdale announced that she had changed her international allegiance and would represent Germany in future. She has held dual British-German nationality since birth.

== Competition record ==
Year	Competition	Venue	Position	Event	Notes
Representing United Kingdom
2011	World Cross Country Championships	Punta Umbría, Spain	59th	Senior race	
2011	European Cross Country Championships	Velenje, Slovenia	11th	Senior race	
2011	European Cross Country Championships	Velenje, Slovenia	1st	Team race	
2012	European Championships	Helsinki, Finland	3rd	5,000 m	15:12.77
2012	Olympic Games	London, England	8th	10,000 m	30:55.63 PB
2012	Olympic Games	London, England	8th	5,000 m	15:14.55 (Semi-final 15:02 PB)

== Personal bests ==
- 3000 metres – 8:46.38 min (2012)
- 5000 metres – 15:02.00 min (2012)
- 10,000 metres – 30:55.63 min (2012)
- 10K run – 33:00 min (2005)
