= Olga Kharitonova =

Russian sprinter (born 1990)

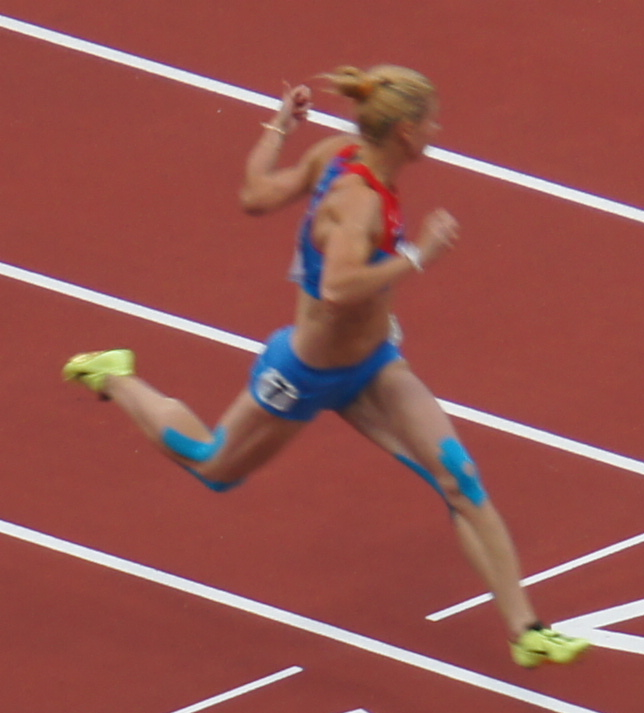
Olga Belkina at the 2012 Summer Olympics

Olga Kharitonova (née Belkina; born August 23, 1990, in Saint Petersburg) is a Russian sprinter. She competed in the 100 metres competition at the 2012 Summer Olympics; she ran Round 1 in 11.38 seconds, which did not qualify her for the semifinals. She also ran in the heats of the women's 4 × 100 m.
