= Eric Krüger =

German sprinter

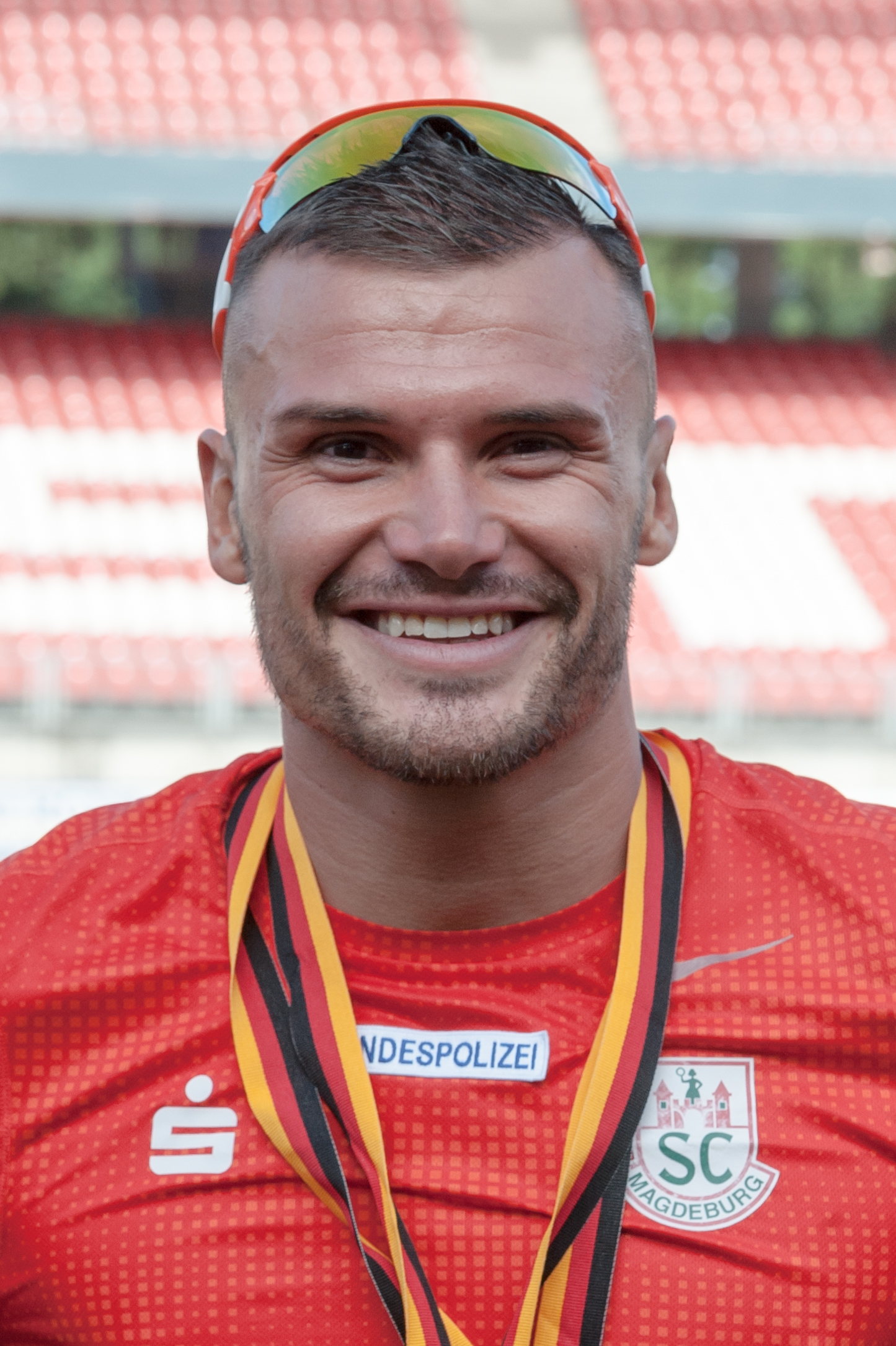
- Krüger in 2015

Personal information
- Full name: Eric Krüger
- Born: 21 March 1988 (age 38) Oschatz, Bezirk Leipzig, East Germany
- Height: 1.75 m (5 ft 9 in)
- Weight: 74 kg (163 lb)

Sport
- Country: Germany
- Sport: Athletics
- Event: 400 metres

Achievements and titles
- Regional finals: 3rd at the 2012 European Athletics Championships
- Personal best(s): 400 metres: 45.97 (Mannheim; June 2012)

Eric Krüger (born 21 March 1988, in Oschatz) is a German athlete who competes in the sprint with a personal best time of 45.77 seconds over 400 metres.

Krüger won the bronze medal at the 2012 European Athletics Championships in Helsinki at the 4 × 400 metres relay.
