= 2012 European Athletics Championships – Women's 10,000 metres =

Women's 10,000 metres at the European Athletics Championships

The women's 10,000 metres at the 2012 European Athletics Championships was held at the Helsinki Olympic Stadium on 1 July.

== Medalists ==
Gold	Ana Dulce Félix; Portugal
Silver	Joanne Pavey; Great Britain
Bronze	Olha Skrypak; Ukraine

== Records ==
Standing records prior to the 2012 European Athletics Championships
World record	Wang Junxia (CHN)	29:31.78	Beijing, China	8 September 1993
European record	Elvan Abeylegesse (TUR)	29:56.34	Beijing, China	15 August 2008
Championship record	Paula Radcliffe (GBR)	30:01.09	Munich, Germany	8 August 2002
World Leading	Tirunesh Dibaba (ETH)	30:24.39	Eugene, United States	1 June 2012
European Leading	Yelizaveta Grechishnikova (RUS)	31:07.88	Moscow, Russia	11 June 2012

== Schedule ==
Date	Time	Round
1 July 2012	17:25	Final

== Results ==
=== Final ===
Rank	Name	Nationality	Time	Note
1st place, gold medalist(s)	Ana Dulce Félix	Portugal	31:44.75	
2nd place, silver medalist(s)	Joanne Pavey	Great Britain	31:49.03	
3rd place, bronze medalist(s)	Olha Skrypak	Ukraine	31:51.32	NUR
4	Fionnuala Britton	Ireland	32:05.54	
5	Sabrina Mockenhaupt	Germany	32:16.55	
6	Charlotte Purdue	Great Britain	32:28.46	
7	Ana Dias	Portugal	32:35.82	
8	Elena Romagnolo	Italy	32:42.31	
9	Gemma Steel	Great Britain	32:46.32	
10	Leonor Carneiro	Portugal	33:05.92	PB
11	Lidia Rodríguez	Spain	33:09.53	
12	Tetyana Holovchenko	Ukraine	33:18.15	
13	Marta Silvestre	Spain	34:21.24	
14	Patricia Morceli Bühler	Switzerland	34:24.82	
	Nadia Ejjafini	Italy	DNF	
	Krisztina Papp	Hungary	DNF	
