= 2012 European Athletics Championships – Men's 10,000 metres =

Men's 10,000 metres at the European Athletics Championships

The men's 10,000 metres at the 2012 European Athletics Championships was held at the Helsinki Olympic Stadium on 30 June.

== Medalists ==
Gold	Polat Kemboi Arıkan; Turkey
Silver	Daniele Meucci; Italy
Bronze	Yevgeniy Rybakov; Russia

== Records ==
Standing records prior to the 2012 European Athletics Championships
World record	Kenenisa Bekele (ETH)	26:17.53	Brussels, Belgium	26 August 2005
European record	Mo Farah (GBR)	26:46.57	Eugene, United States	3 June 2011
Championship record	Martti Vainio (FIN)	27:30.99	Prague, Czechoslovakia	29 August 1978
World Leading	Wilson Kiprop (KEN)	27:01.98	Eugene, United States	1 June 2012
European Leading	Daniele Meucci (ITA)	27:32.86	Stanford, United States	29 April 2012

== Schedule ==
Date	Time	Round
30 June 2012	21:00	Final

== Results ==
=== Final ===
Rank	Name	Nationality	Time	Note
1st place, gold medalist(s)	Polat Kemboi Arıkan	Turkey	28:22.27	
2nd place, silver medalist(s)	Daniele Meucci	Italy	28:22.73	
3rd place, bronze medalist(s)	Yevgeniy Rybakov	Russia	28:22.95	SB
4	Bashir Abdi	Belgium	28:23.72	
5	Carles Castillejo	Spain	28:24.51	
6	Ayad Lamdassem	Spain	28:26.46	
7	Khalid Choukoud	Netherlands	28:26.82	PB
8	Rui Pedro Silva	Portugal	28:31.16	SB
9	Keith Gerrard	Great Britain	28:57.97	
10	Manuel Ángel Penas	Spain	29:02.01	
11	Koen Naert	Belgium	29:02.08	
12	Stefano La Rosa	Italy	29:02.53	
13	Abdi Nageeye	Netherlands	29:05.12	
14	Adil Bouafif	Sweden	29:07.31	
15	Mark Kenneally	Ireland	29:10.55	
16	Mats Lunders	Belgium	29:16.46	
17	Denis Mayaud	France	29:16.83	
18	Tasama Moogas	Israel	29:22.03	
19	Ronald Schröer	Netherlands	29:31.06	
20	Roman Romanenko	Ukraine	29:32.57	
21	David Rooney	Ireland	29:57.82	SB
22	Jarkko Järvenpää	Finland	30:59.63	
	Mustafa Mohamed	Sweden	DNF	
	Mykola Labovskyy	Ukraine	DNF	
	Yousef El Kalai	Portugal	DNF	
	José Rocha	Portugal	DNF	Doping
