= Yuliya Balykina =

Belarusian sprinter (1984–2015)

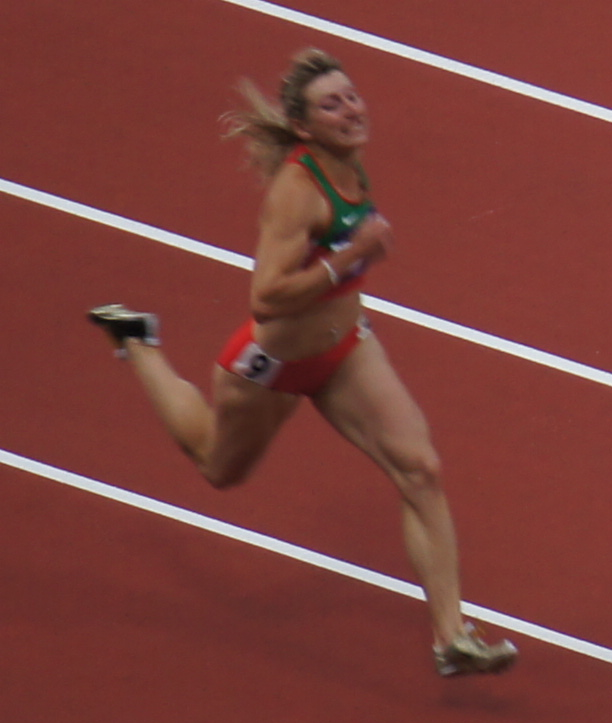
- Balykina at the 2012 Summer Olympics

Personal information
- Nationality: Belarusian
- Born: 12 April 1984 Bulgan, Mongolia
- Died: late October 2015 (aged 31) Minsk, Belarus
- Height: 1.65 m (5 ft 5 in)
- Weight: 60 kg (132 lb)

Sport
- Sport: Track and field
- Events: 100m, 4 × 100m

Yuliya Vladimirovna Balykina (Belarusian: Юлія Уладзіміраўна Балыкіна, Russian: Юлия Владимировна Балыкина; 12 April 1984 – late October 2015) was a Belarusian sprinter. At the 2012 Summer Olympics, she competed in the Women's 100 metres, and Women's 4 × 100 metres relay. Balykina tested positive for drostanolone in an out-of-competition doping test in June 2013 and was banned from competitive athletics for two years. Her period of ineligibility ended on 24 July 2015.

== Disappearance and discovery of body ==
Balykina was reported as missing on 28 October 2015. She was found dead in a wooded area near Minsk on 16 November 2015. Balykina's body had been wrapped in plastic and a former boyfriend of hers confessed to the murder.

== See also ==
- List of solved missing person cases (post-2000)
