= 2012 European Athletics Championships – Women's 4 × 100 metres relay =

Women's 4 × 100 metres relay at the European Athletics Championships

The women's 4 × 100 metres relay at the 2012 European Athletics Championships was held at the Helsinki Olympic Stadium on 30 June and 1 July.

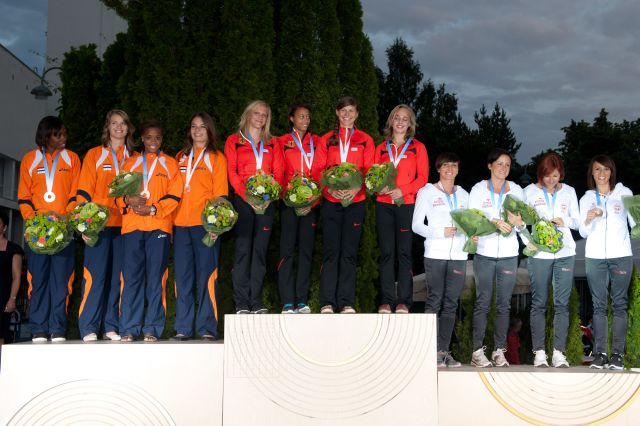
The medalists

== Medalists ==
Gold	Leena Günther, Anne Cibis; Tatjana Lofamakanda Pinto, Verena Sailer; Germany
Silver	Kadene Vassell, Dafne Schippers; Eva Lubbers, Jamile Samuel; Netherlands
Bronze	Marika Popowicz, Daria Korczyńska; Marta Jeschke, Ewelina Ptak; Poland

== Records ==
Standing records prior to the 2012 European Athletics Championships
World record	East Germany; Silke Gladisch, Sabine Rieger; Ingrid Auerswald, Marlies Göhr	41.37	Canberra, Australia	6 October 1985
European record	East Germany; Silke Gladisch, Sabine Rieger; Ingrid Auerswald, Marlies Göhr	41.37	Canberra, Australia	6 October 1985
Championship record	East Germany; Silke Möller, Katrin Krabbe; Kerstin Behrendt, Sabine Günther	41.68	Split, Yugoslavia	1 September 1990
World Leading	United States RED	42.19	Philadelphia, United States	28 April 2012
European Leading	Ukraine; Nataliya Pohrebnyak, Mariya Ryemyen; Olesya Povh, Viktoriya Pyatachenko	42.60	Yalta, Ukraine	29 May 2012
Broken records during the 2012 European Athletics Championships
European Leading	Germany; Leena Günther, Anne Cibis; Tatjana Lofamakanda Pinto, Verena Sailer	42.51	Helsinki, Finland	1 July 2012

== Schedule ==
Date	Time	Round
30 June 2012	13:05	Round 1
1 July 2012	17:05	Final

== Results ==
=== Round 1 ===
First 3 in each heat (Q) and 2 best performers (q) advance to the Final.

Rank	Heat	Lane	Nation	Athletes	Time	Notes
1	1	2	Ukraine	Olesya Povh, Nataliya Pohrebnyak, Mariya Ryemyen, Viktoriya Pyatachenko	42.70	Q
2	2	8	Germany	Leena Günther, Anne Cibis, Tatjana Lofamakanda Pinto, Verena Sailer	43.03	Q, SB
3	1	3	France	Carima Louami, Ayodelé Ikuesan, Jennifer Galais, Christine Arron	43.12	Q, SB
4	1	6	Poland	Marika Popowicz, Daria Korczyńska, Marta Jeschke, Ewelina Ptak	43.13	Q, SB
5	1	4	Switzerland	Michelle Cueni, Jacqueline Gasser, Ellen Sprunger, Léa Sprunger	43.51	q, NR
6	2	7	Russia	Yevgeniya Polyakova, Yekaterina Kuzina, Yekaterina Voronenkova, Olga Belkina	43.62	Q, SB
7	1	5	Belarus	Volha Astashka, Katsiaryna Hanchar, Elena Danilyuk-Nevmerzhytskaya, Yuliya Balykina	43.69	q
8	2	3	Netherlands	Esther Akihary, Marit Dopheide, Eva Lubbers, Kadene Vassell	43.80	Q
9	2	1	Belgium	Olivia Borlée, Hanna Mariën, Hanne Claes, Anne Zagré	43.81	SB
10	2	5	Italy	Gloria Hooper, Audrey Alloh, Martina Amidei, Ilenia Draisci	43.90	SB
11	1	7	Slovenia	Alja Sitar, Sara Strajnar, Kristina Žumer, Merlene Ottey	44.28	SB
12	2	4	Finland	Maria Räsänen, Noora Hämäläinen, Minna Laukka, Hanna-Maari Latvala	44.65	SB
13	1	8	Bulgaria	Gabriela Laleva, Tezdzhan Naimova, Karin Okoliye, Vaia Vladeva	45.25	
14	1	1	Spain	Belén Recio, Plácida Martínez, Alazne Furundarena, Sara María Santiago	45.47	
	2	6	Great Britain	Anyika Onuora, Montell Douglas, Hayley Jones, Ashleigh Nelson	DQ	R 163.3a
	2	2	Sweden	Julia Skugge, Erica Jarder, Freja Jernstig, Lena Berntsson	DQ	R 170.7

=== Final ===
Rank	Lane	Nation	Athletes	Time	Notes
1st place, gold medalist(s)	6	Germany	Leena Günther, Anne Cibis, Tatjana Lofamakanda Pinto, Verena Sailer	42.51	EL
2nd place, silver medalist(s)	7	Netherlands	Kadene Vassell, Dafne Schippers, Eva Lubbers, Jamile Samuel	42.80	NR
3rd place, bronze medalist(s)	8	Poland	Marika Popowicz, Daria Korczyńska, Marta Jeschke, Ewelina Ptak	43.06	
4	4	Russia	Yevgeniya Polyakova, Yekaterina Kuzina, Yekaterina Voronenkova, Olga Belkina	43.37	
5	3	France	Carima Louami, Ayodelé Ikuesan, Lina Jacques-Sébastien, Christine Arron	43.44	
6	1	Switzerland	Michelle Cueni, Jacqueline Gasser, Ellen Sprunger, Léa Sprunger	43.61	
7	2	Belarus	Volha Astashka, Katsiaryna Hanchar, Elena Danilyuk-Nevmerzhytskaya, Yuliya Balykina	44.06	
	5	Ukraine	Olesya Povh, Nataliya Pohrebnyak, Mariya Ryemyen, Viktoriya Pyatachenko	DNF	
