= 2012 European Athletics Championships – Men's 5000 metres =

Athletics event

Men's 5000 metres at the European Athletics Championships

The men's 5000 metres at the 2012 European Athletics Championships was held at the Helsinki Olympic Stadium on 27 June.

== Medalists ==
Gold	Mo Farah; Great Britain
Silver	Arne Gabius; Germany
Bronze	Polat Kemboi Arıkan; Turkey

== Records ==
Standing records prior to the 2012 European Athletics Championships
World record	Kenenisa Bekele (ETH)	12:37.35	Hengelo, Netherlands	31 May 2004
European record	Mohammed Mourhit (BEL)	12:49.71	Brussels, Belgium	25 August 2000
Championship record	Jack Buckner (GBR)	13:10.15	Stuttgart, West Germany	31 August 1986
World Leading	Mo Farah (GBR)	12:56.98	Eugene, United States	2 June 2012
European Leading	Mo Farah (GBR)	12:56.98	Eugene, United States	2 June 2012

== Schedule ==
Date	Time	Round
27 June 2012	19:40	Final

== Results ==
=== Final ===
Rank	Name	Nationality	Time	Note
1st place, gold medalist(s)	Mo Farah	Great Britain	13:29.91	
2nd place, silver medalist(s)	Arne Gabius	Germany	13:31.83	
3rd place, bronze medalist(s)	Polat Kemboi Arıkan	Turkey	13:32.63	
4	Yohan Durand	France	13:32.65	
5	Daniele Meucci	Italy	13:32.69	
6	Hayle Ibrahimov	Azerbaijan	13:36.05	
7	Dennis Licht	Netherlands	13:37.99	
8	Bashir Abdi	Belgium	13:39.01	
9	Serhiy Lebid	Ukraine	13:40.07	
10	Manuel Ángel Penas	Spain	13:41.40	
11	Stefano La Rosa	Italy	13:41.99	
12	Francisco Javier Alves	Spain	13:42.46	
13	Adil Bouafif	Sweden	13:50.13	
14	Rory Fraser	Great Britain	13:51.05	
15	Philipp Pflieger	Germany	13:51.23	
16	Tiidrek Nurme	Estonia	13:51.29	
17	Brenton Rowe	Austria	13:51.58	
18	Sindre Buraas	Norway	13:51.64	
19	Anatoliy Rybakov	Russia	13:52.79	
20	Jesús España	Spain	13:55.98	
21	Mats Lunders	Belgium	14:06.55	
22	Philipp Bandi	Switzerland	14:07.48	
23	Mitch Goose	Great Britain	14:21.91	
	Jesper van der Wielen	Netherlands	DNF	
	Maksym Cerrone Obrubanskyy	Italy	DQ	R163.3b
