= 2012 European Athletics Championships – Men's 400 metres =

Men's 400 metres at the European Athletics Championships

The men's 400 metres at the 2012 European Athletics Championships was held at the Helsinki Olympic Stadium on 27, 28 and 29 June.

== Medalists ==
Gold	Pavel Maslák; Czech Republic
Silver	Marcell Deák-Nagy; Hungary
Bronze	Yannick Fonsat; France

== Records ==
Standing records prior to the 2012 European Athletics Championships
World record	Michael Johnson (USA)	43.18	Seville, Spain	26 August 1999
European record	Thomas Schönlebe (GDR)	44.33	Rome, Italy	3 September 1987
Championship record	Iwan Thomas (GBR)	44.52	Budapest, Hungary	21 August 1998
World Leading	LaShawn Merritt (USA)	44.12	Eugene, United States	24 June 2012
European Leading	Kevin Borlée (BEL)	44.56	Brussels, Belgium	16 June 2012

== Schedule ==
Date	Time	Round
27 June 2012	13:35	Round 1
28 June 2012	18:40	Semifinals
29 June 2012	21:25	Final

== Results ==
=== Round 1 ===
First 4 in each heat (Q) and 4 best performers (q) advance to the Semifinals.

Rank	Heat	Lane	Name	Nationality	Time	Note
1	1	7	Brian Gregan	Ireland	45.63	Q, PB
2	2	5	Richard Buck	Great Britain	45.83	Q
3	1	5	Pavel Maslák	Czech Republic	45.87	Q
4	3	5	Donald Sanford	Israel	45.90	Q
5	2	6	Jānis Leitis	Latvia	45.92	Q, PB
5	4	7	Yannick Fonsat	France	45.92	Q
7	4	6	Marco Vistalli	Italy	45.98	Q
8	3	7	Marcell Deák-Nagy	Hungary	46.19	Q
9	3	8	Krasimir Braikov	Bulgaria	46.20	Q, SB
10	5	8	Mehmet Güzel	Turkey	46.21	Q, SB
11	1	4	Kacper Kozłowski	Poland	46.30	Q
12	4	8	Eric Krüger	Germany	46.33	Q
13	4	5	Jente Bouckaert	Belgium	46.37	Q
14	2	8	Johan Wissman	Sweden	46.43	Q
15	5	3	Marcin Marciniszyn	Poland	46.47	Q
16	3	6	Daniel Němeček	Czech Republic	46.61	Q
17	2	3	Antoine Gillet	Belgium	46.62	Q
18	2	4	Lorenzo Valentini	Italy	46.64	q
19	4	4	Jan Tesař	Czech Republic	46.75	q
20	5	7	Nick Ekelund-Arenander	Denmark	46.78	Q
21	2	1	Piotr Wiaderek	Poland	46.83	q
22	1	3	Mark Ujakpor	Spain	47.07	Q
23	2	2	Roberto Briones	Spain	47.20	q
24	5	1	Lev Mosin	Russia	47.39	Q
25	5	4	Hakim Ibrahimov	Azerbaijan	47.47	
26	4	2	Sorin Vatamanu	Romania	47.50	
27	3	3	Halit Kiliç	Turkey	47.91	
28	4	3	Trausti Stefánsson	Iceland	48.17	
29	2	7	Kristijan Efremov	Macedonia	48.80	
30	5	6	Jonathan Lavers	Gibraltar	50.23	
31	5	2	Fabian Haldner	Liechtenstein	50.77	
	1	2	Yavuz Can	Turkey	DQ	
	1	6	Ville Wendelin	Finland	DQ	
	1	8	Brent LaRue	Slovenia	DQ	
	3	2	Luke Lennon-Ford	Great Britain	DQ	
	3	4	Samuel García	Spain	DQ	
	5	5	Teddy Venel	France	DQ	

=== Semifinals ===
First 2 in each heat (Q) and 2 best performers (q) advance to the Final.

Rank	Heat	Lane	Name	Nationality	Time	Note
1	3	4	Pavel Maslák	Czech Republic	45.66	Q
2	1	5	Marcell Deák-Nagy	Hungary	45.68	Q, SB
3	3	6	Brian Gregan	Ireland	45.76	Q
4	1	3	Donald Sanford	Israel	45.77	Q
5	1	6	Yannick Fonsat	France	45.78	q
6	1	4	Marcin Marciniszyn	Poland	45.88	q
6	3	5	Jānis Leitis	Latvia	45.88	=NR
8	2	5	Marco Vistalli	Italy	46.01	Q
9	2	3	Richard Buck	Great Britain	46.13	Q
10	2	7	Johan Wissman	Sweden	46.35	
11	2	1	Piotr Wiaderek	Poland	46.45	
12	2	6	Mehmet Güzel	Turkey	46.46	
13	3	3	Kacper Kozłowski	Poland	46.54	
14	1	7	Nick Ekelund-Arenander	Denmark	46.57	
15	2	4	Krasimir Braikov	Bulgaria	46.62	
16	3	8	Eric Krüger	Germany	46.68	
17	3	2	Lev Mosin	Russia	46.77	
18	1	2	Lorenzo Valentini	Italy	46.96	
19	3	7	Antoine Gillet	Belgium	47.15	
20	1	1	Jan Tesař	Czech Republic	47.27	
21	3	1	Mark Ujakpor	Spain	47.27	
22	2	2	Roberto Briones	Spain	47.56	
	1	8	Jente Bouckaert	Belgium	DQ	
	2	8	Daniel Němeček	Czech Republic	DQ	

=== Final ===
Rank	Lane	Name	Nationality	Time	Note
1st place, gold medalist(s)	4	Pavel Maslák	Czech Republic	45.24	
2nd place, silver medalist(s)	3	Marcell Deák-Nagy	Hungary	45.52	SB
3rd place, bronze medalist(s)	1	Yannick Fonsat	France	45.82	
4	7	Donald Sanford	Israel	45.91	
5	8	Richard Buck	Great Britain	45.92	
6	5	Brian Gregan	Ireland	46.04	
7	2	Marcin Marciniszyn	Poland	46.46	
8	6	Marco Vistalli	Italy	4:04.20	
