= 2012 European Athletics Championships – Women's discus throw =

European Olympic Championships

Women's discus throw at the European Athletics Championships

The women's discus throw at the 2012 European Athletics Championships was held at the Helsinki Olympic Stadium on 30 June and 1 July.

== Medalists ==
Gold	Sandra Perković; Croatia
Silver	Nadine Müller; Germany
Bronze	Natalya Semenova; Ukraine

== Records ==
Standing records prior to the 2012 European Athletics Championships
World record	Gabriele Reinsch (GDR)	76.80	Neubrandenburg, East Germany	9 July 1988
European record	Gabriele Reinsch (GDR)	76.80	Neubrandenburg, East Germany	9 July 1988
Championship record	Diana Sachse (GDR)	71.36	Stuttgart, West Germany	28 August 1986
World Leading	Nadine Müller (GER)	68.89	Bar, Montenegro	18 March 2012
European Leading	Nadine Müller (GER)	68.89	Bar, Montenegro	18 March 2012

== Schedule ==
Date	Time	Round
30 June 2012	11:00	Qualification
1 July 2012	18:05	Final

== Results ==
=== Qualification ===
Qualification: Qualification Performance 61.00 (Q) or at least 12 best performers advance to the final

Rank	Group	Athlete	Nationality	#1	#2	#3	Result	Notes
1	A	Nadine Müller	Germany	64.49			64.49	Q
2	B	Sandra Perković	Croatia	x	62.01		62.01	Q
3	B	Mélina Robert-Michon	France	57.84	60.69	61.86	61.86	Q
4	B	Dragana Tomašević	Serbia	56.48	59.04	61.65	61.65	Q
5	B	Anna Rüh	Germany	55.90	58.42	60.73	60.73	q
6	B	Julia Fischer	Germany	59.05	59.95	59.72	59.95	q
7	A	Natalya Semenova	Ukraine	x	59.59	57.42	59.59	q
8	A	Joanna Wiśniewska	Poland	56.39	57.54	x	57.54	q
9	B	Natalia Artîc	Moldova	49.48	57.42	x	57.42	q
10	B	Monique Jansen	Netherlands	57.12	x	56.43	57.12	q
11	A	Věra Cechlová	Czech Republic	57.52	57.18	56.21	57.52	q
12	A	Tamara Apostolico	Italy	55.64	56.95	53.29	56.95	q
13	B	Eliška Staňková	Czech Republic	55.22	x	x	55.22	
14	A	Dilek Esmer	Turkey	53.94	55.11	55.00	55.11	
15	B	Laura Bordignon	Italy	49.56	52.07	55.11	55.11	
16	B	Kateryna Karsak	Ukraine	x	54.32	x	54.32	
17	A	Zinaida Sendriūtė	Lithuania	53.97	x	x	53.97	
18	A	Sabina Asenjo	Spain	53.92	x	x	53.92	
19	B	Tanja Komulainen	Finland	x	50.04	53.52	53.52	
20	A	Irina Rodrigues	Portugal	x	52.35	53.01	53.01	
21	A	Sanna Kämäräinen	Finland	50.70	51.97	52.21	52.21	
22	A	Jade Nicholls	Great Britain	49.46	50.38	51.75	51.75	
23	B	Jitka Kubelová	Czech Republic	47.28	50.49	51.71	51.71	
24	A	Salome Rigishvili	Georgia	45.71	x	49.65	49.65	
25	A	Kätlin Tõllasson	Estonia	48.55	x	x	48.55	

=== Final ===
Rank	Athlete	Nationality	#1	#2	#3	#4	#5	#6	Result	Notes
1st place, gold medalist(s)	Sandra Perković	Croatia	x	x	67.62	62.93	x	62.53	67.62	
2nd place, silver medalist(s)	Nadine Müller	Germany	63.53	64.99	65.41	x	62.03	64.01	65.41	
3rd place, bronze medalist(s)	Natalya Semenova	Ukraine	x	61.03	x	62.45	62.91	60.41	62.91	
4	Anna Rüh	Germany	60.30	58.49	x	59.83	62.65	59.43	62.65	
5	Julia Fischer	Germany	55.17	59.45	60.24	61.11	62.10	x	62.10	
6	Mélina Robert-Michon	France	58.70	x	x	x	60.41	60.41	60.41	
7	Věra Cechlová	Czech Republic	60.08	x	57.58	x	x	x	60.08	
8	Natalia Artîc	Moldova	57.83	58.64	54.26	55.04	57.38	57.73	58.64	
9	Dragana Tomašević	Serbia	x	57.24	58.34				58.34	
10	Joanna Wiśniewska	Poland	56.49	55.47	57.72				57.72	
11	Monique Jansen	Netherlands	55.91	57.03	x				57.03	
12	Tamara Apostolico	Italy	56.15	55.90	x				56.15	
