= 2012 European Athletics Championships – Women's 5000 metres =

Women's 5000 metres at the European Athletics Championships

The women's 5000 metres at the 2012 European Athletics Championships was held at the Helsinki Olympic Stadium on 28 June.

== Medalists ==
Gold	Olga Golovkina; Russia
Silver	Sara Moreira; Portugal
Bronze	Julia Bleasdale; Great Britain

== Records ==
Standing records prior to the 2012 European Athletics Championships
World record	Tirunesh Dibaba (ETH)	14:11.15	Oslo, Norway	6 June 2008
European record	Liliya Shobukhova (RUS)	14:23.75	Kazan, Russia	19 July 2008
Championship record	Alemitu Bekele (TUR)	14:52.20	Barcelona, Spain	1 August 2010
World Leading	Vivian Cheruiyot (KEN)	14:35.62	Rome, Italy	31 May 2012
European Leading	Sara Moreira (POR)	15:08.33	Watford, Great Britain	9 June 2012

== Schedule ==
Date	Time	Round
28 June 2012	17:35	Final

== Results ==
=== Final ===
Rank	Name	Nationality	Time	Note
1st place, gold medalist(s)	Olga Golovkina	Russia	15:11.70	
2nd place, silver medalist(s)	Sara Moreira	Portugal	15:12.05	
3rd place, bronze medalist(s)	Julia Bleasdale	Great Britain	15:12.77	PB
4	Roxana Bârcă	Romania	15:13.40	PB
5	Nadia Ejjafini	Italy	15:16.54	PB
6	Almensh Belete	Belgium	15:22.15	SB
7	Elena Romagnolo	Italy	15:24.38	
8	Judith Plá	Spain	15:27.62	SB
9	Dudu Karakaya	Turkey	15:29.71	
10	Christine Bardelle	France	15:33.49	
11	Barbara Maveau	Belgium	15:33.68	
12	Layes Abdullayeva	Azerbaijan	15:33.88	SB
13	Silvia Weissteiner	Italy	15:39.23	
14	Helen Clitheroe	Great Britain	15:49.13	SB
15	Maren Kock	Germany	15:52.74	
16	Lidia Rodríguez	Spain	16:07.73	
DQ	Svetlana Kireyeva	Russia	~~15:19.55~~	Doping
DQ	Lyudmyla Kovalenko	Ukraine	~~15:12.03~~	Doping
	Fadime Suna	Turkey	DNF	
	Sabine Fischer	Switzerland	DNF	
	Johanna Lehtinen	Finland	DNF	
	Stephanie Twell	Great Britain	DNS	
