= 2012 European Athletics Championships – Women's 100 metres =

Women's 100 metres at the 2012 European Athletics Championships
- Venue: Helsinki Olympic Stadium
- Location: Helsinki
- Dates: 27 June (round 1 & semifinals ); 28 June (final)
- Competitors: 32 from 23 nations
- Winning time: 11.28

Medalists
| gold medal | Ivet Lalova | Bulgaria |
| silver medal | Olesya Povh | Ukraine |
| bronze medal | Lina Grinčikaitė | Lithuania |

The women's 100 metres at the 2012 European Athletics Championships were held at the Helsinki Olympic Stadium on 27 and 28 June.

== Records ==
Standing records prior to the 2012 European Athletics Championships
| World record | Florence Griffith Joyner (USA) | 10.49 | Indianapolis, United States | 16 July 1988 |
| European record | Christine Arron (FRA) | 10.73 | Budapest, Hungary | 19 August 1998 |
| Championship record | Christine Arron (FRA) | 10.73 | Budapest, Hungary | 19 August 1998 |
| World Leading | Carmelita Jeter (USA) | 10.81 | Kingston, Jamaica | 5 May 2012 |
| European Leading | Olesya Povh (UKR) | 11.08 | Yalta, Ukraine | 4 June 2012 |
Broken records during the 2012 European Athletics Championships
| European Leading | Ivet Lalova (BUL) | 11.06 | Helsinki, Finland | 27 June 2012 |

== Schedule ==
| Date | Time | Round |
|---|---|---|
| 27 June 2012 | 10:00 | Round 1 |
| 27 June 2012 | 20:05 | Semifinals |
| 28 June 2012 | 18:30 | Final |

== Results ==
=== Round 1 ===
First 3 in each heat (Q) and 4 best performers (q) advance to the Semifinals.

Wind:
Heat 1: −0.3 m/s, Heat 2: +1.7 m/s, Heat 3: −0.3 m/s, Heat 4: +1.0 m/s

| Rank | Heat | Lane | Name | Nationality | Time | Note |
|---|---|---|---|---|---|---|
| 1 | 2 | 4 | Ivet Lalova | Bulgaria | 11.06 | Q, EL |
| 2 | 4 | 5 | Verena Sailer | Germany | 11.14 | Q, SB |
| 3 | 2 | 3 | Olga Belkina | Russia | 11.26 | Q, PB |
| 4 | 2 | 7 | Ezinne Okparaebo | Norway | 11.27 | Q |
| 5 | 1 | 1 | Olesya Povh | Ukraine | 11.30 | Q |
| 6 | 3 | 2 | Lina Grinčikaitė | Lithuania | 11.38 | Q |
| 7 | 4 | 3 | Yuliya Balykina | Belarus | 11.39 | Q |
| 8 | 1 | 5 | Anne Cibis | Germany | 11.40 | Q, SB |
| 9 | 3 | 8 | Tatjana Lofamakanda Pinto | Germany | 11.41 | Q |
| 10 | 4 | 8 | Ashleigh Nelson | Great Britain | 11.43 | Q, SB |
| 11 | 3 | 4 | Daria Korczyńska | Poland | 11.46 | Q |
| 12 | 1 | 3 | Nimet Karakuş | Turkey | 11.48 | Q |
| 13 | 4 | 6 | Nataliya Pohrebnyak | Ukraine | 11.50 | q |
| 14 | 3 | 1 | Yulia Nestsiarenka | Belarus | 11.52 | q |
| 15 | 1 | 4 | Kateřina Čechová | Czech Republic | 11.53 | q |
| 15 | 2 | 8 | Audrey Alloh | Italy | 11.53 | q |
| 17 | 1 | 7 | Christine Arron | France | 11.55 | |
| 17 | 2 | 5 | Andreea Ograzeanu | Romania | 11.55 | SB |
| 17 | 4 | 2 | Yevgeniya Polyakova | Russia | 11.55 | |
| 20 | 2 | 1 | María Belibasáki | Greece | 11.56 | |
| 21 | 2 | 6 | Amy Foster | Ireland | 11.58 | |
| 22 | 1 | 2 | Martina Amidei | Italy | 11.60 | |
| 23 | 4 | 1 | Folake Akinyemi | Norway | 11.62 | |
| 24 | 1 | 8 | Eleni Artymata | Cyprus | 11.64 | |
| 25 | 1 | 6 | Sónia Tavares | Portugal | 11.65 | |
| 26 | 3 | 6 | Hanna-Maari Latvala | Finland | 11.67 | |
| 27 | 4 | 7 | Mujinga Kambundji | Switzerland | 11.68 | |
| 28 | 3 | 3 | Gabriela Laleva | Bulgaria | 11.79 | |
| 29 | 3 | 5 | Jeanette Kwakye | Great Britain | 11.98 | |
| 30 | 4 | 4 | Diane Borg | Malta | 12.14 | SB |
| 31 | 3 | 7 | Ivana Rožman | Macedonia | 12.86 | |
| 32 | 2 | 2 | Cristina Llovera | Andorra | 13.01 | |

=== Semifinals ===
First 3 in each heat (Q) and 2 best performers (q) advance to the Final.

Wind:
Heat 1: 0.0 m/s, Heat 2: +2.0 m/s

| Rank | Heat | Lane | Name | Nationality | Time | Note |
|---|---|---|---|---|---|---|
| 1 | 2 | 6 | Olesya Povh | Ukraine | 11.13 | Q |
| 2 | 2 | 4 | Verena Sailer | Germany | 11.17 | Q |
| 3 | 1 | 6 | Ivet Lalova | Bulgaria | 11.23 | Q |
| 4 | 1 | 3 | Olga Belkina | Russia | 11.30 | Q |
| 5 | 1 | 5 | Lina Grinčikaitė | Lithuania | 11.34 | Q, SB |
| 6 | 2 | 5 | Anne Cibis | Germany | 11.36 | Q, SB |
| 7 | 1 | 7 | Ezinne Okparaebo | Norway | 11.39 | q |
| 8 | 1 | 4 | Tatjana Lofamakanda Pinto | Germany | 11.39 | q |
| 9 | 2 | 3 | Yuliya Balykina | Belarus | 11.42 | |
| 10 | 2 | 7 | Daria Korczyńska | Poland | 11.43 | |
| 11 | 2 | 8 | Ashleigh Nelson | Great Britain | 11.43 | =SB |
| 12 | 2 | 2 | Kateřina Čechová | Czech Republic | 11.45 | |
| 13 | 2 | 1 | Audrey Alloh | Italy | 11.51 | |
| 14 | 1 | 1 | Nataliya Pohrebnyak | Ukraine | 11.52 | |
| 15 | 1 | 8 | Nimet Karakuş | Turkey | 11.61 | |
| | 1 | 2 | Yulia Nestsiarenka | Belarus | DNS | |

=== Final ===
| Rank | Lane | Name | Nationality | Time | Note |
|---|---|---|---|---|---|
| 1st place, gold medalist(s) | 4 | Ivet Lalova | Bulgaria | 11.28 | |
| 2nd place, silver medalist(s) | 3 | Olesya Povh | Ukraine | 11.32 | |
| 3rd place, bronze medalist(s) | 8 | Lina Grinčikaitė | Lithuania | 11.32 | SB |
| 4 | 2 | Ezinne Okparaebo | Norway | 11.39 | |
| 5 | 5 | Olga Belkina | Russia | 11.42 | |
| 6 | 6 | Verena Sailer | Germany | 11.42 | |
| 7 | 7 | Anne Cibis | Germany | 11.54 | |
| 8 | 1 | Tatjana Lofamakanda Pinto | Germany | 11.62 | |
| | | | | Wind: -0.7 m/s | |
