= 2012 European Athletics Championships – Men's 200 metres =

Men's 200 metres at the 2012 European Athletics Championships
- Venue: Helsinki Olympic Stadium
- Location: Helsinki
- Dates: 29 June (heats & semi-finals); 30 June (final)
- Competitors: 35 from 25 nations
- Winning time: 20.42

Medalists
| gold medal | Churandy Martina | Netherlands |
| silver medal | Patrick van Luijk | Netherlands |
| bronze medal | Daniel Talbot | Great Britain |

The men's 200 metres at the 2012 European Athletics Championships was held at the Helsinki Olympic Stadium on 29 and 30 June.

== Records ==
Standing records prior to the 2012 European Athletics Championships
| World record | Usain Bolt (JAM) | 19.19 | Berlin, Germany | 20 August 2009 |
| European record | Pietro Mennea (ITA) | 19.72 | Mexico City, Mexico | 12 September 1979 |
| Championship record | Konstantinos Kenteris (GRE) | 19.85 | Munich, Germany | 9 August 2002 |
| World Leading | Yohan Blake (JAM) | 19.91 | Kingston, Jamaica | 5 May 2012 |
| European Leading | Churandy Martina (NED) | 19.94 | New York City, United States | 9 June 2012 |

== Schedule ==
| Date | Time | Round |
|---|---|---|
| 29 June 2012 | 12:30 | Round 1 |
| 29 June 2012 | 20:25 | Semi-finals |
| 30 June 2012 | 22:20 | Final |

== Results ==
=== Round 1 ===
First 4 in each heat (Q) and 4 best performers (q) advance to the Semifinals.

==== Heat 1 ====
| Rank | Lane | Athlete | Nation | Time | Notes |
|---|---|---|---|---|---|
| 1 | 7 | Jonathan Borlée | Belgium | 20.61 | Q |
| 2 | 4 | Ben Bassaw | France | 20.73 | Q |
| 3 | 6 | Diego Marani | Italy | 20.89 | Q |
| 4 | 8 | Bruno Hortelano | Spain | 21.08 | Q |
| 5 | 2 | Aliaksandr Linnik | Belarus | 21.20 | q |
| – | 5 | Rachid Chouhal | Malta | DNF | |
| – | 3 | Serhiy Smelyk | Ukraine | DQ | TR 162.7 |
| | | | | Wind: -0.3 m/s | |

==== Heat 2 ====
| Rank | Lane | Athlete | Nation | Time | Notes |
|---|---|---|---|---|---|
| 1 | 6 | Churandy Martina | Netherlands | 20.74 | Q |
| 2 | 5 | Alex Wilson | Switzerland | 20.75 | Q |
| 3 | 4 | Nil de Oliveira | Sweden | 20.78 | Q, =PB |
| 4 | 7 | Sebastian Ernst | Germany | 20.96 | Q |
| 5 | 2 | Vojtěch Šulc | Czech Republic | 21.17 | q |
| 6 | 8 | Catalin Cîmpeanu | Romania | 21.37 | |
| 7 | 3 | Jan Žumer | Slovenia | 21.50 | |
| | | | | Wind: -1.1 m/s | |

==== Heat 3 ====
| Rank | Lane | Athlete | Nation | Time | Notes |
|---|---|---|---|---|---|
| 1 | 6 | Patrick van Luijk | Netherlands | 20.78 | Q |
| 2 | 8 | Christopher Clarke | Great Britain | 20.83 | Q |
| 3 | 5 | Davide Manenti | Italy | 20.84 | Q |
| 4 | 7 | Petar Kremenski | Bulgaria | 21.03 | Q |
| 5 | 4 | Arnaldo Abrantes | Portugal | 21.24 | q |
| 6 | 2 | Fabian Haldner | Liechtenstein | 23.32 | |
| – | 3 | Steven Colvert | Ireland | DQ | TR 163.3 |
| | | | | Wind: -0.5 m/s | |

==== Heat 4 ====
| Rank | Lane | Athlete | Nation | Time | Notes |
|---|---|---|---|---|---|
| 1 | 5 | Lykourgos-Stefanos Tsakonas | Greece | 20.73 | Q |
| 2 | 7 | Paul Hession | Ireland | 20.75 | Q, SB |
| 3 | 2 | Sven Knipphals | Germany | 20.94 | Q |
| 4 | 3 | Jonathan Åstrand | Finland | 21.20 | Q |
| 5 | 6 | Kiril Kirilov | Bulgaria | 21.45 | |
| – | 4 | Ihor Bodrov | Ukraine | DQ | TR 163.3 |
| | | | | Wind: -0.1 m/s | |

==== Heat 5 ====
| Rank | Lane | Athlete | Nation | Time | Notes |
|---|---|---|---|---|---|
| 1 | 3 | Daniel Talbot | Great Britain | 20.82 | Q |
| 2 | 6 | Kamil Kryński | Poland | 20.88 | Q |
| 3 | 7 | Marek Niit | Estonia | 20.93 | Q, SB |
| 4 | 2 | Reto Schenkel | Switzerland | 20.96 | Q |
| 5 | 8 | Aleksandr Khyutte | Russia | 21.27 | q |
| 6 | 5 | Jerrel Feller | Netherlands | 21.32 | |
| 7 | 5 | Jerai Torres | Gibraltar | 22.31 | PB |
| | | | | Wind: +0.4 m/s | |

=== Semi-finals ===
First 2 in each heat (Q) and 2 best performers (q) advance to the Final.

==== Heat 1 ====
| Rank | Lane | Athlete | Nation | Time | Notes |
|---|---|---|---|---|---|
| 1 | 4 | Churandy Martina | Netherlands | 20.63 | Q |
| 2 | 6 | Christopher Clarke | Great Britain | 20.90 | Q |
| 3 | 5 | Ben Bassaw | France | 20.91 | |
| 4 | 8 | Sven Knipphals | Germany | 20.92 | |
| 5 | 3 | Kamil Kryński | Poland | 20.93 | |
| 6 | 7 | Reto Schenkel | Switzerland | 21.05 | |
| 7 | 1 | Aliaksandr Linnik | Belarus | 21.43 | |
| – | 2 | Vojtěch Šulc | Czech Republic | DQ | TR 162.7 |
| | | | | Wind: -0.3 m/s | |

==== Heat 2 ====
| Rank | Lane | Athlete | Nation | Time | Notes |
|---|---|---|---|---|---|
| 1 | 5 | Daniel Talbot | Great Britain | 20.69 | Q |
| 2 | 3 | Nil de Oliveira | Sweden | 20.83 | Q |
| 3 | 8 | Diego Marani | Italy | 20.83 | q |
| 4 | 4 | Paul Hession | Ireland | 20.84 | q |
| 5 | 7 | Sebastian Ernst | Germany | 20.91 | |
| 6 | 2 | Jonathan Åstrand | Finland | 21.27 | |
| 7 | 1 | Arnaldo Abrantes | Portugal | 21.36 | |
| – | 6 | Lykourgos-Stefanos Tsakonas | Greece | DQ | TR 163.3 |
| | | | | Wind: -0.1 m/s | |

==== Heat 3 ====
| Rank | Lane | Athlete | Nation | Time | Notes |
|---|---|---|---|---|---|
| 1 | 6 | Patrick van Luijk | Netherlands | 20.68 | Q |
| 2 | 3 | Jonathan Borlée | Belgium | 20.74 | Q |
| 3 | 4 | Alex Wilson | Switzerland | 20.87 | |
| 4 | 5 | Davide Manenti | Italy | 21.07 | |
| 5 | 7 | Petar Kremenski | Bulgaria | 21.08 | |
| 6 | 2 | Bruno Hortelano | Spain | 21.35 | |
| 7 | 8 | Marek Niit | Estonia | 21.44 | |
| – | 1 | Aleksandr Khyutte | Russia | DNS | |
| | | | | Wind: -1.7 m/s | |

=== Final ===
| Rank | Lane | Athlete | Nation | Time | Notes |
|---|---|---|---|---|---|
| 1st place, gold medalist(s) | 3 | Churandy Martina | Netherlands | 20.42 | |
| 2nd place, silver medalist(s) | 6 | Patrick van Luijk | Netherlands | 20.87 | |
| 3rd place, bronze medalist(s) | 5 | Daniel Talbot | Great Britain | 20.95 | |
| 4 | 4 | Jonathan Borlée | Belgium | 20.99 | |
| 5 | 8 | Nil de Oliveira | Sweden | 21.11 | |
| 6 | 7 | Christopher Clarke | Great Britain | 21.26 | |
| 7 | 2 | Diego Marani | Italy | 21.26 | |
| 8 | 1 | Paul Hession | Ireland | 21.27 | |
| | | | | Wind: -0.9 m/s | |
