= 2016 European Athletics Championships – Men's half marathon =

Men's half marathon at the European Athletics Championships
- Location: Amsterdam
- Dates: 10 July
- Competitors: 92 from 31 nations
- Winning time: 1:02:03

Medalists
gold medal	Tadesse Abraham	Switzerland
silver medal	Kaan Kigen Özbilen	Turkey
bronze medal	Daniele Meucci	Italy

The men's half marathon at the 2016 European Athletics Championships took place on the streets of Amsterdam on 10 July. The start and finish of the race were on the Museumplein. Due to 2016 being an Olympic year the marathon is replaced by a half marathon. This is the first time that the half marathon has been run during the European Championships.

== Records ==
Standing records prior to the 2016 European Athletics Championships
World record	Zersenay Tadese (ERI)	58:23	Lisbon, Portugal	21 March 2010
European record	Mo Farah (GBR)	59:32	Lisbon, Portugal	22 March 2015
World Leading	Solomon Kirwa Yego (KEN)	58:44	Rome, Italy	13 March 2016
European Leading	Mo Farah (GBR)	59:59	Cardiff, United Kingdom	26 March 2016

== Schedule ==
Date	Time	Round
10 July 2016	09:50	Final

All times are local times (UTC+2)

== Results ==
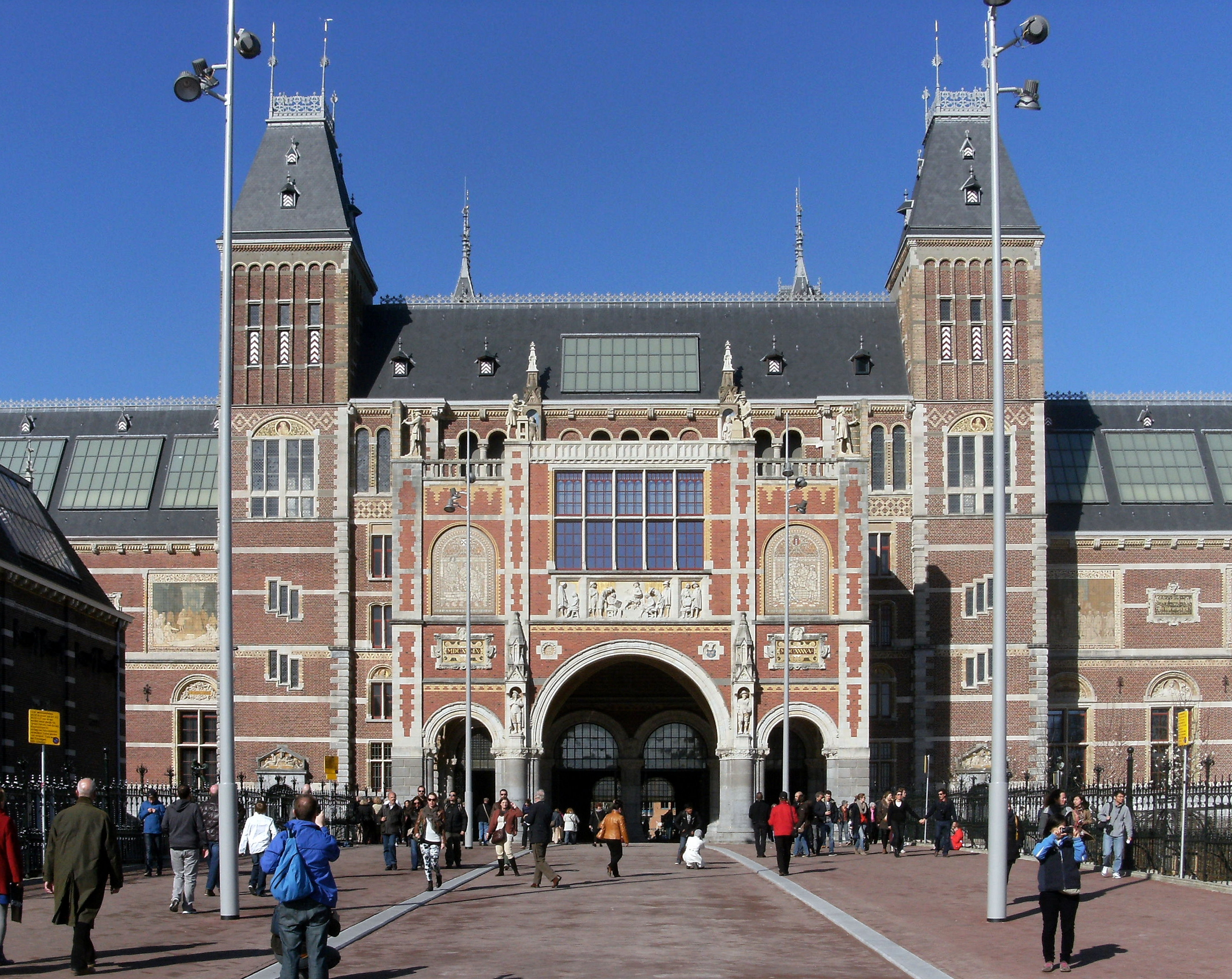
The entrance to the Rijksmuseum where the start and finish took place

=== Final ===
==== Individual ====
Rank	Athlete	Nationality	Time	Notes
1st place, gold medalist(s)	Tadesse Abraham	Switzerland	1:02:03	
2nd place, silver medalist(s)	Kaan Kigen Özbilen	Turkey	1:02:27	
3rd place, bronze medalist(s)	Daniele Meucci	Italy	1:02:38	SB
4	Marcin Chabowski	Poland	1:02:54	SB
5	Abdi Hakin Ulad	Denmark	1:03:22	
6	Abdi Nageeye	Netherlands	1:03:43	
7	Hassan Chahdi	France	1:03:43	
8	Carles Castillejo	Spain	1:03:52	
9	Callum Hawkins	Great Britain	1:03:57	
10	Jesús España	Spain	1:04:01	
11	Dmytro Lashyn	Ukraine	1:04:11	SB
12	Ayad Lamdassem	Spain	1:04:13	
13	Stefano La Rosa	Italy	1:04:15	
14	Mikael Ekvall	Sweden	1:04:28	SB
15	Julien Lyon	Switzerland	1:04:40	PB
16	Szymon Kulka	Poland	1:04:47	
17	Paul Pollock	Ireland	1:04:58	
18	Ercan Muslu	Turkey	1:05:00	
19	Evans Kiplagat	Azerbaijan	1:05:01	
20	Lemawork Ketema	Austria	1:05:10	
21	Mustafa Mohamed	Sweden	1:05:11	
22	Roman Prodius	Moldova	1:05:14	
23	David Nilsson	Sweden	1:05:16	
24	Julian Flügel	Germany	1:05:18	
25	Marius Ionescu	Romania	1:05:21	
26	Adrian Lehmann	Switzerland	1:05:21	
27	Michel Butter	Netherlands	1:05:24	SB
28	Soufiane Bouchikhi	Belgium	1:05:31	
29	Ruggero Pertile	Italy	1:05:48	
30	Asbjørn Ellefsen Persen	Norway	1:05:56	
31	Roman Fosti	Estonia	1:06:00	SB
32	Mick Clohisey	Ireland	1:06:00	
33	Philipp Pflieger	Germany	1:06:01	
34	Kevin Seaward	Ireland	1:06:20	
35	Rui Pinto	Portugal	1:06:28	
36	Tom Wiggers	Netherlands	1:06:29	
37	Marius Øyre Vedvik	Norway	1:06:29	
38	Xavier Chevrier	Italy	1:06:31	
39	Bart van Nunen	Netherlands	1:06:41	
40	Ihor Russ	Ukraine	1:06:45	SB
41	Oleksandr Matviychuk	Ukraine	1:06:53	
42	Matthew Bond	Great Britain	1:07:00	
43	Yimer Getahun	Israel	1:07:02	SB
44	Fredrik Uhrbom	Sweden	1:07:06	
45	Mert Girmalegesse	Turkey	1:07:07	
46	Serkan Kaya	Turkey	1:07:09	
47	Christian Kreienbühl	Switzerland	1:07:09	
48	Remigijus Kančys	Lithuania	1:07:12	
49	José Moreira	Portugal	1:07:17	
50	Jarkko Järvenpää	Finland	1:07:21	
51	Jens Nerkamp	Germany	1:07:22	
52	Lee Merrien	Great Britain	1:07:29	
53	Yohan Durand	France	1:07:32	
54	Yuriy Rusyuk	Ukraine	1:07:38	
55	Jānis Viškers	Latvia	1:07:40	
56	Maru Teferi	Israel	1:07:40	
57	Sergiu Ciobanu	Ireland	1:07:46	
58	Edwin Kemboi	Austria	1:07:51	
59	Milan Kocourek	Czech Republic	1:08:00	
60	Jonas Lurås Hammer	Norway	1:08:06	
61	Konstantinos Gkelaouzos	Greece	1:08:09	
62	Roman Romanenko	Ukraine	1:08:14	
63	Samuel Barata	Portugal	1:08:30	
64	Jiří Homoláč	Czech Republic	1:08:34	
65	Daniele D'Onofrio	Italy	1:08:41	
66	Romain Courcières	France	1:08:42	
67	Marcel Berni	Switzerland	1:08:47	
68	Hans Kristian Fløystad	Norway	1:08:55	
69	Gábor Józsa	Hungary	1:08:57	
70	Berihun Wuve	Israel	1:09:11	
71	Valentin Pfeil	Austria	1:09:34	
72	Iván Fernández	Spain	1:09:38	
73	Yavuz Ağralı	Turkey	1:09:41	
74	Anton Kosmač	Slovenia	1:09:45	
75	Eirik Gramstad	Norway	1:09:55	
76	Rui Pedro Silva	Portugal	1:10:04	
77	Jonathan Hay	Great Britain	1:10:08	
78	Ageze Guadie	Israel	1:10:45	
79	Pavel Dymák	Czech Republic	1:10:55	
80	Andreas Kempf	Switzerland	1:11:10	
81	Taras Salo	Ukraine	1:11:24	
82	Vít Pavlišta	Czech Republic	1:11:58	
83	Marcel Tschopp	Liechtenstein	1:15:36	
84	Ørjan Grønnevig	Norway	1:18:12	
	Pedro Ribeiro	Portugal	DNF	
	Khalid Choukoud	Netherlands	DNF	
	Hendrik Pfeiffer	Germany	DNF	
	Arne Gabius	Germany	DNF	
	Mark Hanrahan	Ireland	DNF	
	Gary Murray	Ireland	DNF	
	Polat Kemboi Arıkan	Turkey	DNF	
	Iolo Nikolov	Bulgaria	DNF	

==== Team ====
Rank	Nation	Time	Notes
1st place, gold medalist(s)	(Switzerland) Switzerland; Tadesse Abraham; Julien Lyon; Adrian Leman; Christian Kreienbühl; Marcel Berni; Andreas Kempf	3:12:04	
2nd place, silver medalist(s)	(Spain) Spain; Carles Castillejo; Jesús España; Ayad Lamdassem; Iván Fernández	3:12:06	
3rd place, bronze medalist(s)	(Italy) Italy; Daniele Meucci; Stefano La Rosa; Ruggero Pertile; Xavier Chevrier; Daniele D'Onofrio	3:12:41	
4	Turkey	3:14:34	
5	Sweden	3:14:55	
6	Netherlands	3:15:36	
7	(Republic of Ireland) Ireland	3:17:18	
8	Ukraine	3:17:49	
9	(United Kingdom) Great Britain & Northern Ireland	3:18:26	
10	Germany	3:18:41	
11	France	3:19:57	
12	Norway	3:20:31	
13	Portugal	3:22:15	
14	Austria	3:22:35	
15	Israel	3:23:53	
16	Czech Republic	3:27:29	
