= Slovenia at the 2026 European Athletics Championships =

- Flag of Slovenia
- WA code: SLO

in Birmingham, United Kingdom 10–16 August 2026
- Competitors: 27 (13 men and 14 women)
- Medals: Gold 1 Silver 0 Bronze 0 Total 1

European Athletics Championships appearances
- 1994; 1998; 2002; 2006; 2010; 2012; 2014; 2016; 2018; 2022; 2024; 2026

Slovenia competed at the 2026 European Athletics Championships in Birmingham, United Kingdom from 10–16 August 2026.

== Medallists ==
Medal	Name	Event	Date
Gold	Kristjan Čeh	Men's discus throw	13 August

== Results ==
Slovenia entered the following athletes.

Key

- Q = Qualified for the next round
- q = Qualified for the next round as a fastest loser or, in field events, by position without achieving the qualifying target
- NR = National record
- PB = Personal best
- SB = Season best
- N/A = Round not applicable for the event

Track and road events
Men

Athlete	Event	Heat		Semifinal		Final	
Athlete	Event	Result	Rank	Result	Rank	Result	Rank
Anej Čurin Prapotnik	100 m	Bye		10.36	5	Did not advance	
Rok Ferlan	400 m	Bye		46.09	8	Did not advance	
Lovro Mesec Košir	400 m	46.66	21	Did not advance			
Jan Vukovič	800 m	1:47.80	7	Did not advance			
Filip Jakob Demšar	110 m hurdles	14.41	20	Did not advance			
Matic Ian Guček	400 m hurdles	Bye		48.03 NR	2 Q		
Mitja Zubin	400 m hurdles	50.61	19	Did not advance			
Anej Čurin Prapotnik; Timotej Cvelbar; Staš Tin Lorbar; Filip Oiclj; Andrej Skočir	4 × 100 m relay			—N/a			
Maj Janža; Lovro Mesec Košir; Mitja Zubin; Rok Ferlan	4 × 400 m relay	DQ		—N/a		Did not advance	

Women

Athlete	Event	Heat		Semifinal		Final	
Athlete	Event	Result	Rank	Result	Rank	Result	Rank
Zala Istenič	100 m	DQ		Did not advance			
Lina Hribar	200 m	23.74	20	Did not advance			
Zala Istenič	200 m	DNS					
Anita Horvat	800 m	2:03.68	7	Did not advance			
Klara Lukan	10,000 m	—N/a					
Maruša Mišmaš-Zrimšek	10,000 m	—N/a					
Liza Šajn	Marathon	—N/a					
Ajda Kaučič; Anita Horvat; Maja Pogorevc; Maša Medjimurec	4 × 400 m relay	3:35.82	8	—N/a		Did not advance	

Field events

Athlete	Event	Qualification		Final	
Athlete	Event	Distance	Position	Distance	Position
Kristjan Čeh	Men's discus throw	67.52	2 Q	72.51 CR	1st place, gold medalist(s)
Lia Apostolovski	Women's high jump	1.88	16	Did not advance	
Ela Velepec	Women's high jump	1.84	27	Did not advance	
Tina Šutej	Women's pole vault	4.40	13	Did not advance	
Neja Filipič	Women's triple jump	14.05	11 q	13.87	10
