= 2016 European Athletics Championships – Women's half marathon =

Women's half marathon at the European Athletics Championships
- Location: Amsterdam
- Dates: 10 July
- Competitors: 90 from 28 nations
- Winning time: 1:10:19

Medalists
| gold medal | Sara Moreira | Portugal |
| silver medal | Veronica Inglese | Italy |
| bronze medal | Jéssica Augusto | Portugal |

The women's half marathon at the 2016 European Athletics Championships took place at the Olympic Stadium on 10 July. Due to 2016 being an Olympic year the marathon was replaced by a half marathon. It was the first time that the half marathon had been run during the European Championships.

== Records ==
Standing records prior to the 2016 European Athletics Championships
| World record | Florence Kiplagat (KEN) | 1:05:09 | Barcelona, Spain | 15 February 2015 |
| European record | Lornah Kiplagat (NED) | 1:06:25 | Udine, Italy | 14 October 2007 |
| World Leading | Violah Jepchumba (KEN) | 1:05:51 | Prague, Czech Republic | 2 April 2016 |
| European Leading | Christelle Daunay (FRA) | 1:09:58 | Paris, France | 6 March 2016 |

== Schedule ==
| Date | Time | Round |
|---|---|---|
| 10 July 2016 | 09:30 | Final |

All times are local times (UTC+2)

== Results ==
=== Final ===
==== Individual ====
| Rank | Athlete | Nationality | Time | Notes |
|---|---|---|---|---|
| 1st place, gold medalist(s) | Sara Moreira | Portugal | 1:10:19 | |
| 2nd place, silver medalist(s) | Veronica Inglese | Italy | 1:10:35 | PB |
| 3rd place, bronze medalist(s) | Jéssica Augusto | Portugal | 1:10:55 | SB |
| 4 | Rasa Drazdauskaitė | Lithuania | 1:11:47 | PB |
| 5 | Esma Aydemir | Turkey | 1:11:49 | PB |
| 6 | Ourania Rebouli | Greece | 1:11:52 | NR |
| 7 | Monica Madalina Florea | Romania | 1:11:56 | |
| 8 | Eva Vrabcová-Nývltová | Czech Republic | 1:12:01 | |
| 9 | Agnieszka Mierzejewska | Poland | 1:12:10 | |
| 10 | Gemma Steel | Great Britain | 1:12:19 | |
| 11 | Sultan Haydar | Turkey | 1:12:34 | |
| 12 | Ana Dulce Félix | Portugal | 1:12:39 | SB |
| 13 | Alyson Dixon | Great Britain | 1:12:47 | SB |
| 14 | Anna Incerti | Italy | 1:12:51 | SB |
| 15 | Martina Strähl | Switzerland | 1:12:55 | |
| 16 | Jacqueline Gandar | France | 1:13:00 | |
| 17 | Anja Scherl | Germany | 1:13:03 | |
| 18 | Maryna Damantsevich | Belarus | 1:13:09 | |
| 19 | Rosaria Console | Italy | 1:13:12 | |
| 20 | Anne-Mari Hyryläinen | Finland | 1:13:13 | |
| 21 | Olha Skrypak | Ukraine | 1:13:14 | |
| 22 | Paula Todoran | Romania | 1:13:16 | SB |
| 23 | Maja Neuenschwander | Switzerland | 1:13:18 | |
| 24 | Krisztina Papp | Hungary | 1:13:23 | |
| 25 | Nina Savina | Belarus | 1:13:23 | PB |
| 26 | Elizeba Cherono | Netherlands | 1:13:27 | |
| 27 | Alessandra Aguilar | Spain | 1:13:28 | |
| 28 | Olivera Jevtić | Serbia | 1:13:39 | |
| 29 | Laila Soufyane | Italy | 1:13:42 | |
| 30 | Andrea Mayr | Austria | 1:13:49 | |
| 31 | Jess Draskau-Petersson | Denmark | 1:13:50 | SB |
| 32 | Nastassia Ivanova | Belarus | 1:13:59 | PB |
| 33 | Diana Lobačevskė | Lithuania | 1:14:06 | |
| 34 | Ruth van der Meijden | Netherlands | 1:14:12 | |
| 35 | Laura Manninen | Finland | 1:14:16 | PB |
| 36 | Azucena Diaz | Spain | 1:14:21 | |
| 37 | Iryna Somava | Belarus | 1:14:44 | |
| 38 | Catherine Bertone | Italy | 1:15:06 | |
| 39 | Laura Hrebec | Switzerland | 1:15:08 | PB |
| 40 | Lonah Chemtai Salpeter | Israel | 1:15:22 | |
| 41 | Laurane Picoche | France | 1:15:24 | |
| 42 | Sonja Roman | Slovenia | 1:15:27 | |
| 43 | Sevilay Eytemiş | Turkey | 1:15:36 | |
| 44 | Anna Holm Baumeister | Denmark | 1:15:40 | |
| 45 | Andreea Alina Piscu | Romania | 1:15:47 | PB |
| 46 | Marisa Barros | Portugal | 1:15:53 | |
| 47 | Sophie Duarte | France | 1:15:59 | |
| 48 | Claire McCarthy | Ireland | 1:16:02 | |
| 49 | Kim Dillen | Netherlands | 1:16:11 | |
| 50 | Sofiya Yaremchuk | Ukraine | 1:16:30 | SB |
| 51 | Isabell Teegen | Germany | 1:16:32 | |
| 52 | Yelena Dolinin | Israel | 1:16:44 | PB |
| 53 | Lily Partridge | Great Britain | 1:16:57 | |
| 54 | Darya Mykhaylova | Ukraine | 1:17:06 | |
| 55 | Katharina Heinig | Germany | 1:17:15 | |
| 56 | Estela Navascués | Spain | 1:17:16 | |
| 57 | Fanny Pruvost | France | 1:17:19 | |
| 58 | Frida Lunden | Sweden | 1:17:22 | |
| 59 | Tina Muir | Great Britain | 1:17:23 | |
| 60 | Vanessa Fernandes | Portugal | 1:17:27 | |
| 61 | Kateryna Karmanenko | Ukraine | 1:17:28 | SB |
| 62 | Jamie van Lieshout | Netherlands | 1:17:36 | |
| 63 | Monika Juodeškaitė | Lithuania | 1:17:39 | |
| 64 | Veronika Brennhovd Blom | Norway | 1:17:45 | |
| 65 | Martina Tresch | Switzerland | 1:17:47 | |
| 66 | Anita Baierl | Austria | 1:17:48 | |
| 67 | Minna Lamminen | Finland | 1:17:48 | |
| 68 | Kristine Helle | Norway | 1:17:50 | PB |
| 69 | Remalda Kergytė-Dauskurdienė | Lithuania | 1:17:56 | |
| 70 | Emma Nordling | Sweden | 1:17:58 | |
| 71 | Gladys Ganiel O'Neill | Ireland | 1:18:06 | SB |
| 72 | Svitlana Stanko-Klymenko | Ukraine | 1:18:18 | |
| 73 | Eli Anne Dvergsdal | Norway | 1:18:29 | PB |
| 74 | Anna Hahner | Germany | 1:18:41 | |
| 75 | Runa Skrove Falch | Norway | 1:19:11 | |
| 76 | Cecilla Norrbom | Sweden | 1:19:19 | |
| 77 | Tubay Erdal | Turkey | 1:19:25 | |
| 78 | Marthe Katrine Myhre | Norway | 1:19:38 | |
| 79 | Zsófia Erdélyi | Hungary | 1:21:32 | |
| 80 | Agata Strausa | Latvia | 1:21:42 | |
| 81 | Yasemin Can | Turkey | 1:23:25 | |
| | Charlotte Purdue | Great Britain | DNF | |
| | Dominika Napieraj | Poland | DNF | |
| | Franziska Reng | Germany | DNF | |
| | Meryem Erdoğan | Turkey | DNF | |
| | Melina Trankle | Germany | DNF | |
| | Militsa Mircheva | Bulgaria | DNF | |
| | Marta Silvestre | Spain | DNF | |
| | Severine Hamel | France | DNF | |
| | Liliana Danci | Romania | DNF | |

==== Team ====
| Rank | Nation | Time | Notes |
|---|---|---|---|
| 1st place, gold medalist(s) | (Portugal) Portugal; Sara Moreira; Jessica Augusto; Dulce Félix; Marisa Barros; Vanessa Fernandes | 3:33:53 | |
| 2nd place, silver medalist(s) | (Italy) Italy; Veronica Inglese; Anna Incerti; Rosaria Console; Laila Soufyane; Catherine Bertone | 3:36:38 | |
| 3rd place, bronze medalist(s) | (Turkey) Turkey; Esma Aydemir; Sultan Haydar; Sevilay Eytemiş; Tubay Erdal; Yasemin Can; Meryem Erdoğan | 3:39:59 | |
| 4 | Belarus | 3:40:31 | |
| 5 | Romania | 3:40:59 | |
| 6 | Switzerland | 3:41:21 | |
| 7 | (United Kingdom) Great Britain & Northern Ireland | 3:42:03 | |
| 8 | Lithuania | 3:43:32 | |
| 9 | Netherlands | 3:43:50 | |
| 10 | France | 3:44:23 | |
| 11 | Spain | 3:45:05 | |
| 12 | Finland | 3:45:17 | |
| 13 | Ukraine | 3:46:50 | |
| 14 | Germany | 3:46:50 | |
| 15 | Norway | 3:54:04 | |
| 16 | Sweden | 3:54:39 | |
