= Ukraine at the 2016 European Athletics Championships =

- Flag of Ukraine
- WA code: UKR
- National federation: Ukrainian Athletic Federation

in Amsterdam, Netherlands 6 July 2016 – 10 July 2016
- Competitors: 80 (39 men and 41 women)
- Medals Ranked =17th: Gold 1 Silver 0 Bronze 0 Total 1

European Athletics Championships appearances
- 1994; 1998; 2002; 2006; 2010; 2012; 2014; 2016; 2018; 2022; 2024; 2026

Other related appearances
- Soviet Union (1946–1990)

Ukraine competed at the 2016 European Athletics Championships in Amsterdam, Netherlands, between 6 and 10 July 2016.

== Medallists ==
Medal	Name	Event	Date
Gold	Nataliya Pryshchepa	Women's 800 metres	9 July

== Results ==
Ukraine entered the following athletes.

Key

- Q = Qualified for the next round
- q = Qualified for the next round as a fastest loser or, in field events, by position without achieving the qualifying target
- NR = National record
- PB = Personal best
- SB = Season best
- N/A = Round not applicable for the event

=== Men ===
Track and road events

Athlete	Event	Heat		Semifinal		Final	
Athlete	Event	Result	Rank	Result	Rank	Result	Rank
Volodymyr Suprun	100 m	10.58	24	Did not advance			
Emil Ibrahimov	100 m	10.61	25	Did not advance			
Vitaliy Korzh	100 m	DNF	Did not advance				
Vitaliy Korzh	200 m	21.49	31	Did not advance			
Ihor Bodrov	200 m	21.13	25	Did not advance			
Serhiy Smelyk	200 m	Bye		20.76	11	Did not advance	
Vitaliy Butrym	400 m	46.77	6 Q	46.07	16	Did not advance	
Yevhen Hutsol	400 m	47.35	17	Did not advance			
Danylo Danylenko	400 m	47.49	19	Did not advance			
Roman Yarko	800 m	1:49.64	17	Did not advance			
Volodymyr Kyts	1500 m	3:43.58	22	Did not advance			
Mykola Nyzhnyk	5000 m	—N/a				14:28.24	18
Dmytro Lashyn	10,000 m	—N/a				28:27.90 PB	4
Serhiy Kopanayko	110 m hurdles	13.74 PB	9 q	13.97	24	Did not advance	
Artem Shamatryn	110 m hurdles	14.47	20	Did not advance			
Stanislav Melnykov	400 m hurdles	50.57 SB	6 q	51.06	23	Did not advance	
Denys Nechyporenko	400 m hurdles	51.53	18	Did not advance			
Anatoliy Synyanskyy	400 m hurdles	DNF	Did not advance				
Vadym Slobodenyuk	3000 m steeplechase	DNF	Did not advance				
Roman Kravtsov; Volodymyr Suprun; Ihor Bodrov; Vitaliy Korzh	4 × 100 m relay	39.12 q	8	—N/a		39.46	8
Danylo Danylenko; Yevhen Hutsol; Volodymyr Burakov; Vitaliy Butrym	4 × 400 m relay	3:03.93 Q	5	—N/a		3:04.45	6

Half marathon

Athlete	Event	Result	Rank
Dmytro Lashyn	Half marathon	1:04:11 SB	11
Ihor Russ	Half marathon	1:06:45 SB	40
Oleksandr Matviychuk	Half marathon	1:06:53	41
Yuriy Rusyuk	Half marathon	1:07:38	54
Roman Romanenko	Half marathon	1:08:14	62
Taras Salo	Half marathon	1:11:24	81
Dmytro Lashyn; Ihor Russ; Oleksandr Matviychuk; Yuriy Rusyuk	Half marathon team	3:17:49	8

Field events

Athlete	Event	Qualification		Final	
Athlete	Event	Distance	Position	Distance	Position
Andriy Protsenko	High jump	2.25	9 Q	2.24	=9
Yuriy Krymarenko	High jump	2.23	18	Did not advance	
Dmytro Yakovenko	High jump	2.19	21	Did not advance	
Taras Neledva	Long jump	7.67w	17	Did not advance	
Serhiy Nykyforov	Long jump	7.59w	21	Did not advance	
Viktor Kuznetsov	Long jump	7.55	22	Did not advance	
Andriy Stanchev	Triple jump	16.22	19	Did not advance	
Mykyta Nesterenko	Discus throw	61.35	20	Did not advance	
Oleksiy Semenov	Discus throw	57.94	27	Did not advance	
Andriy Martynyuk	Hammer throw	72.37	13	Did not advance	
Serhiy Reheda	Hammer throw	66.72	26	Did not advance	
Dmytro Kosynskyy	Javelin throw	79.21	18	Did not advance	
Oleksandr Nychyporchuk	Javelin throw	73.31	29	Did not advance	

Combined events – Decathlon

Athlete	Event	100 m	LJ	SP	HJ	400 m	110H	DT	PV	JT	1500 m	Final	Rank
Oleksiy Kasyanov	Result	10.79	7.43	14.51	1.98	48.97	13.93 CB	42.46	4.80 SB	48.23	4:32.56	8072	4
Oleksiy Kasyanov	Points	908	918	760	785	863	984	715	849	562	728	8072	4

=== Women ===
Track and road events

Athlete	Event	Heat		Semifinal		Final	
Athlete	Event	Result	Rank	Result	Rank	Result	Rank
Olesya Povh	100 m	11.37	4 Q	11.35	8	Did not advance	
Nataliya Pohrebnyak	100 m	Bye		11.27	6 q	11.28	5
Yelizaveta Bryzgina	200 m	23.37	9 Q	23.64	22	Did not advance	
Mariya Ryemyen	200 m	23.67	19	Did not advance			
Nataliya Pohrebnyak	200 m	Bye		22.98	5 Q	22.84	5
Yuliya Olishevska	400 m	Bye		52.54	13	Did not advance	
Olha Zemlyak	400 m	Bye		52.58	14	Did not advance	
Olha Bibik	400 m	Bye		53.02	19	Did not advance	
Nataliya Pryshchepa	800 m	2:02.57	5 Q	2:01.75	10 Q	1:59.70	1st place, gold medalist(s)
Anastasiya Tkachuk	800 m	2:03.80	12 Q	2:01.91	11	Did not advance	
Nataliya Lupu	800 m	2:04.53	16 Q	2:01.74	9	Did not advance	
Nataliya Pryshchepa	1500 m	DNF	Did not advance				
Olha Skrypak	10,000 m	—N/a				33:36.79 SB	15
Olena Yanovska	100 m hurdles	13.23	13	Did not advance			
Hanna Plotitsyna	100 m hurdles	13.23	13 q	13.02 SB	11	Did not advance	
Viktoriya Tkachuk	400 m hurdles	Bye		56.17	9	Did not advance	
Anna Titimets	400 m hurdles	Bye		56.18	10	Did not advance	
Olena Kolesnychenko	400 m hurdles	Bye		56.84	14	Did not advance	
Mariya Shatalova	3000 m steeplechase	9:41.65	4 Q	—N/a		9:38.17 SB	4
Olesya Povh; Nataliya Pohrebnyak; Mariya Ryemyen; Yelizaveta Bryzgina	4 × 100 m relay	42.93 SB	4 Q	—N/a		42.87 SB	4
Yuliya Olishevska; Olha Bibik; Tetyana Melnyk; Olha Zemlyak	4 × 400 m relay	3:27.75	3 Q	—N/a		3:27.64 SB	6

Half marathon

Athlete	Event	Result	Rank
Olha Skrypak	Half marathon	1:13:14	21
Sofiya Yaremchuk	Half marathon	1:16:30 SB	50
Darya Mykhaylova	Half marathon	1:17:06	54
Kateryna Karmanenko	Half marathon	1:17:28 SB	61
Svitlana Stanko-Klymenko	Half marathon	1:18:18	72
Olha Skrypak; Sofiya Yaremchuk; Darya Mykhaylova; Kateryna Karmanenko	Half marathon team	3:46:50	13

Field events

Athlete	Event	Qualification		Final	
Athlete	Event	Distance	Position	Distance	Position
Oksana Okuneva	High jump	1.89	=10 q	1.89	=6
Yuliya Chumachenko	High jump	1.85	15	Did not advance	
Iryna Herashchenko	High jump	1.85	=18	Did not advance	
Maryna Kylypko	Pole vault	4.35	=17	Did not advance	
Maryna Bekh	Long jump	6.50	6 q	6.29	12
Anna Kornuta	Long jump	6.46	12 q	6.42	11
Anna Lunyova	Long jump	6.20w	22	Did not advance	
Olha Saladukha	Triple jump	13.85w	10 q	14.23	6
Ruslana Tsyhotska	Triple jump	13.78	14	Did not advance	
Olha Holodna	Shot put	17.29	9 q	17.65	9
Halyna Obleshchuk	Shot put	16.30	16	Did not advance	
Svitlana Marusenko	Shot put	14.92	27	Did not advance	
Nataliya Semenova	Discus throw	60.33	7 Q	62.21	6
Olha Abramchuk	Discus throw	56.00	17	Did not advance	
Iryna Novozhylova	Hammer throw	69.42	7 q	70.18	8
Alyona Shamotina	Hammer throw	65.69	19	Did not advance	
Hanna Hatsko-Fedusova	Javelin throw	59.34	9 q	58.86	10
Kateryna Derun	Javelin throw	52.92	27	Did not advance	
Tetyana Fetiskina	Javelin throw	52.90	28	Did not advance	

Combined events – Heptathlon

Athlete	Event	100H	HJ	SP	200 m	LJ	JT	800 m	Final	Rank
Hanna Kasyanova	Result	13.59	1.77 SB	14.12 PB	24.63 SB	5.63	DNS	DNF	DNF	—
Hanna Kasyanova	Points	1037	941	802	921	738	0	—	DNF	—
