= Czech Republic at the 2016 European Athletics Championships =

- WA code: CZE
- National federation: ČAS
- Website: www.atletika.cz

in Amsterdam
- Competitors: 47 (29 men and 18 women) in 28 events
- Medals Ranked 20th: Gold 0 Silver 4 Bronze 0 Total 4

European Athletics Championships appearances
- 1994; 1998; 2002; 2006; 2010; 2012; 2014; 2016; 2018; 2022; 2024; 2026

Other related appearances
- Czechoslovakia (1934–1990)

Czech Republic competed at the 2016 European Athletics Championships in Amsterdam, Netherlands, between 6 and 10 July 2016.

== Medals ==
Medal	Name	Event	Date
Silver	Vítězslav Veselý	Men's javelin throw	7 July
Silver	Adam Helcelet	Men's decathlon	7 July
Silver	Pavel Maslák	Men's 400 m	8 July
Silver	Jan Kudlička	Men's pole vault	8 July

== Results ==
Men

Track & road events

Athlete	Event	Heat		Semifinal		Final	
Athlete	Event	Result	Rank	Result	Rank	Result	Rank
Jan Veleba	100 m	10.30	8 Q	10.28 =SB	16	Did not advance	
Pavel Maslák	400 m	—N/a		45.31 SB	5 Q	45.36	2nd place, silver medalist(s)
Jakub Holuša	1500 m	DQ		—N/a		Did not advance	
Filip Sasínek	1500 m	3.39.77	4 q	—N/a		3:47.76	8
Petr Vitner	1500 m	3:43.22	18	—N/a		Did not advance	
Michal Brož	400 m hurdles	50.83	9 q	50.85	22	Did not advance	
Vít Müller	400 m hurdles	50.80	8 q	50.70	20	Did not advance	
Michal Desenský; Pavel Maslák; Patrik Šorm; Jan Tesař	4 x 400 m relay	3:02.66 NR	3 Q	—N/a		3:03.86	4
Pavel Dymák	Half marathon	—N/a				1:10:55	79
Jiří Homoláč	Half marathon	—N/a				1:08:34	64
Milan Kocourek	Half marathon	—N/a				1:08:00	59
Vít Pavlišta	Half marathon	—N/a				1:11:58	82
Czech team	Half marathon	—N/a				3:27:29	16

Field Events

Athlete	Event	Qualification		Final	
Athlete	Event	Distance	Rank	Distance	Rank
Jaroslav Bába	High jump	2.25	=6 Q	2.24	7
Michal Balner	Pole vault	5.35	=19	Did not advance	
Jan Kudlička	Pole vault	5.35	12 q	5.60	2nd place, silver medalist(s)
Lukáš Posekaný	Pole vault	5.15	=24	Did not advance	
Radek Juška	Long jump	8.11 SB	2 Q	7.93w	4
Tomáš Voňavka	Discus throw	58.39	25	Did not advance	
Ladislav Prášil	Shot put	19.56	14	Did not advance	
Martin Stašek	Shot put	18.32	27	Did not advance	
Jaroslav Jílek	Javelin throw	81.09	9 q	76.92	10
Jakub Vadlejch	Javelin throw	85.06	2 Q	78.12	9
Vítězslav Veselý	Javelin throw	84.82 SB	3 Q	83.59	2nd place, silver medalist(s)
Lukáš Melich	Hammer throw	70.50	19	Did not advance	

Combined events – Decathlon

Athlete	Event	100 m	LJ	SP	HJ	400 m	110H	DT	PV	JT	1500 m	Final	Rank
Adam Helcelet	Result	11.07	7.07	14.94 SB	1.95	50.36	14.49	47.12 PB	4.90 SB	67.24 PB	4:38.39 SB	8157 SB	2nd place, silver medalist(s)
Adam Helcelet	Points	845	830	786	758	798	912	811	880	847	724	8157 SB	2nd place, silver medalist(s)
Marek Lukáš	Result	11.17	7.00 SB	13.81	1.92 =SB	51.42	14.82	39.38	4.30	66.81	4:33.10 SB	7625	14
Marek Lukáš	Points	823	814	717	731	750	871	652	702	841	724	7625	14
Jiří Sýkora	Result	11.15	6.88	NM	DNS							DNF	
Jiří Sýkora	Points	827	785	0	—							DNF	

Women

Track & road events

Athlete	Event	Heat		Semifinal		Final	
Athlete	Event	Result	Rank	Result	Rank	Result	Rank
Marcela Pirková	200 m	24.03	24	Did not advance			
Kristiina Mäki	5000 m	—N/a				15:52.90	9
Lucie Koudelová	100 m hurdles	13.41	20	Did not advance			
Tereza Vokálová	400 m hurdles	57.97	16	Did not advance			
Lucie Sekanová	3000 m steeplechase	10:10.93	25	—N/a		Did not advance	
Eva Vrabcová-Nývltová	Half marathon	—N/a				1:12:01	8

Field Events

Athlete	Event	Qualification		Final	
Athlete	Event	Distance	Rank	Distance	Rank
Michaela Hrubá	High jump	1.92	=1 Q	1.84	12
Romana Maláčová	Pole vault	NM		Did not advance	
Jiřina Ptáčníková	Pole vault	4.35	=17	Did not advance	
Rebeka Šilhanová	Pole vault	4.00	22	Did not advance	
Lucie Májková	Triple jump	13.81	11 q	13.70w	12
Markéta Červenková	Shot put	16.56	15	Did not advance	
Eliška Staňková	Discus throw	60.32	8 Q	55.90	14
Jarmila Jurkovičová	Javelin throw	53.96	25	Did not advance	
Irena Šedivá	Javelin throw	52.48	29	Did not advance	
Barbora Špotáková	Javelin throw	63.73	1 Q	62.66	5
Kateřina Šafránková	Hammer throw	70.04	4 Q	69.55	9

Combined events – Heptathlon

Athlete	Event	100H	HJ	SP	200 m	LJ	JT	800 m	Final	Rank
Kateřina Cachová	Result	13.33	1.62	11.84	24.30	6.31 SB	44.80	2:13.91	6051	6
Kateřina Cachová	Points	1075	759	651	952	946	760	908	6051	6
