= Germany at the 2016 European Athletics Championships =

- WA code: GER
- National federation: DLV
- Website: www.leichtathletik.de

in Amsterdam
- Competitors: 96 (48 men and 48 women) in 40 events
- Medals Ranked 2nd: Gold 5 Silver 4 Bronze 7 Total 16

European Athletics Championships appearances (overview)
- 1934; 1938; 1946–1950; 1954; 1958; 1962; 1966–1990; 1994; 1998; 2002; 2006; 2010; 2012; 2014; 2016; 2018; 2022; 2024

Germany competed at the 2016 European Athletics Championships in Amsterdam, Netherlands, between 6 and 10 July 2016. A delegation of 104 athletes were sent to represent the country.

== Medals ==
Medal	Name	Event	Date
Gold	Cindy Roleder	Women's 100 metres hurdles	7 July
Gold	Christina Schwanitz	Women's shot put	7 July
Gold	Max Heß	Men's triple jump	9 July
Gold	Gesa-Felicitas Krause	Women's 3000 metres steeplechase	10 July
Gold	David Storl	Men's shot put	10 July
Silver	Julia Fischer	Women's discus throw	8 July
Silver	Betty Heidler	Women's hammer throw	8 July
Silver	Lisa Ryzih	Women's pole vault	9 July
Silver	Linda Stahl	Women's javelin throw	9 July
Bronze	Gina Lückenkemper	Women's 200 m	7 July
Bronze	Shanice Craft	Women's discus throw	8 July
Bronze	Malaika Mihambo	Women's long jump	8 July
Bronze	Richard Ringer	Men's 5000 metres	10 July
Bronze	German team Robert Hering; Lukas Jakubczyk; Sven Knipphals; Julian Reus; Roy Schmidt	Men's 4 × 100 metres relay	10 July
Bronze	German team Tatjana Pinto; Lisa Mayer; Rebekka Haase; Gina Lückenkemper	Women's 4 × 100 metres relay	10 July
Bronze	Eike Onnen	Men's high jump	10 July

== Results ==
Men

Track & road events

Athlete	Event	Heat		Semifinal		Final	
Athlete	Event	Result	Rank	Result	Rank	Result	Rank
Lucas Jakubczyk	100 m	10.35	9 Q	10.16 SB	7	did not advance	
Julian Reus	100 m	—N/a		10.22	12	did not advance	
Julian Reus	200 m	—N/a		20.83	13	did not advance	
Robin Erewa	200 m	21.05	12 q	20.98	18	did not advance	
Aleixo-Platini Menga	200 m	—N/a		21.06	19	did not advance	
Alexander Gladitz	400 m	46.28	3 Q	46.57	22	did not advance	
Johannes Trefz	400 m	47.32	16 Q	46.07	15	did not advance	
Benedikt Huber	800 m	1:47.16	3 Q	1:47.56	10	did not advance	
Sören Ludolph	800 m	1:49.59	16 Q	1:51.69	15	did not advance	
Timo Benitz	1500 m	3:42.40	12	—N/a		did not advance	
Homiyu Tesfaye	1500 m	3:40.44	7 Q	—N/a		3:47.93	10
Florian Orth	5000 m	—N/a				13:45.40	7
Richard Ringer	5000 m	—N/a				13:40.85 SB	3rd place, bronze medalist(s)
Martin Sperlich	5000 m	—N/a				13:48.81	10
Matthias Bühler	110 m hurdles	13.75	10 Q	13.65	17	did not advance	
Alexander John	110 m hurdles	—N/a		13.60	16	did not advance	
Gregor Traber	110 m hurdles	—N/a		13.66	18	did not advance	
Felix Franz	400 m hurdles	51.21	13	did not advance			
Tobias Giehl	400 m hurdles	50.30	3 Q	49.50 PB	10	did not advance	
Robert Hering (only in heats); Lucas Jakubczyk; Sven Knipphals; Julian Reus; Roy Schmidt (only in final)	4 × 100 m relay	38.25 SB	2 Q	—N/a		38.47	3rd place, bronze medalist(s)
Kamghe Gaba; Constantin Schmidt; Patrick Schneider; Johannes Trefz	4 × 400 m relay	3:03.97 SB	6 Q	—N/a		3:05.67	8
Julian Flügel	Half marathon	—N/a				1:05:18	24
Arne Gabius	Half marathon	—N/a				DNF	
Jens Nerkamp	Half marathon	—N/a				1:07:22	51
Hendrik Pfeiffer	Half marathon	—N/a				DNF	
Philipp Pflieger	Half marathon	—N/a				1:06:01	33
German team	Half marathon	—N/a				3:18:41	10

Field Events

Athlete	Event	Qualification		Final	
Athlete	Event	Distance	Rank	Distance	Rank
Eike Onnen	High jump	2.25	=1 Q	2.29	= (bronze)
Karsten Dilla	Pole vault	5.35	12 q	5.30	=7
Raphael Holzdeppe	Pole vault	DNS		did not advance	
Tobias Scherbarth	Pole vault	5.35	19	did not advance	
Alyn Camara	Long jump	7.66	18	did not advance	
Fabian Heinle	Long jump	8.11w	3 Q	7.87	6
Max Heß	Triple jump	16.93w	2 Q	17.20 EL	1st place, gold medalist(s)
Martin Jasper	Triple jump	16.27	18	did not advance	
Tobias Dahm	Shot put	20.42 PB	5 Q	20.25	7
David Storl	Shot put	20.84	1 Q	21.31 EL	1st place, gold medalist(s)
Christoph Harting	Discus throw	65.09	5 Q	65.13	4
Daniel Jasinski	Discus throw	64.89	6 Q	63.35	8
Martin Wierig	Discus throw	63.60	14	did not advance	
Lars Hamann	Javelin throw	78.07	20	did not advance	
Thomas Röhler	Javelin throw	83.98	4 Q	80.78	5
Johannes Vetter	Javelin throw	79.98	16	did not advance	

Combined events – Decathlon

Athlete	Event	100 m	LJ	SP	HJ	400 m	110H	DT	PV	JT	1500 m	Final	Rank
Mathias Brugger	Result	11.16	7.22 SB	14.39	1.98	49.76	14.99	42.79	4.70	57.35 PB	4:30.24	7886	9
Mathias Brugger	Points	825	866	752	785	826	851	721	819	698	743	7886	9
Tim Nowak	Result	11.23	7.11 SB	14.52 PB	1.95 SB	50.89	DNF	27.68	4.60	60.94 PB	4:30.32	6646	19
Tim Nowak	Points	810	840	760	758	774	0	419	790	752	743	6646	19
René Stauß	Result	11.40 SB	7.15 SB	14.39	1.98	52.08	15.63	44.33 SB	NM	57.66 SB	4:49.09	6737	17
René Stauß	Points	774	850	752	785	721	775	753	0	703	624	6737	17

Women

Track & road events

Athlete	Event	Heat		Semifinal		Final	
Athlete	Event	Result	Rank	Result	Rank	Result	Rank
Rebekka Haase	100 m	11.23	1 Q	11.46	12	did not advance	
Tatjana Pinto	100 m	—N/a		11.27	5 Q	11.33	6
Nadine Gonska	200 m	23.13	4 Q	23.24	12	did not advance	
Gina Lückenkemper	200 m	—N/a		22.90	3 Q	22.74	3rd place, bronze medalist(s)
Lisa Mayer	200 m	—N/a		23.06	7 q	23.10	8
Ruth Sophia Spelmeyer	400 m	—N/a		52.40	11	did not advance	
Christina Hering	800 m	2:05.78	28 Q	2:02.56	15	did not advance	
Fabienne Kohlmann	800 m	2:05.54	25	did not advance			
Maren Kock	1500 m	4:11.67	7 q	—N/a		4:34.54	6
Maren Kock	5000 m	—N/a				DNF	
Fate Tola Geleto	5000 m	—N/a				15:43.30	8
Pamela Dutkiewicz	100 m hurdles	—N/a		13.02	11 Q	DNF	
Nadine Hildebrand	100 m hurdles	—N/a		12.95	7	did not advance	
Cindy Roleder	100 m hurdles	—N/a		12.76 SB	1 Q	12.62 EL	1st place, gold medalist(s)
Jackie Baumann	400 m hurdles	58.17	17	did not advance			
Gesa-Felicitas Krause	3000 m steeplechase	9:43.81	6 Q	—N/a		9:18.85 EL	1st place, gold medalist(s)
Maya Rehberg	3000 m steeplechase	9:47.32	14 q	—N/a		DQ	
Jana Sussmann	3000 m steeplechase	9:49.04	18	—N/a		did not advance	
Tatjana Pinto; Lisa Mayer; Rebekka Haase; Gina Lückenkemper	4 × 100 m relay	42.71	2 Q	—N/a		42.48	3rd place, bronze medalist(s)
Lara Hoffmann; Friederike Möhlenkamp; Laura Müller; Ruth Sophia Spelmeyer	4 × 400 m relay	3:28.03 SB	4	—N/a		3:27.60 SB	5
Anna Hahner	Half marathon	—N/a				1:18:41	74
Katharina Heinig	Half marathon	—N/a				1:17:15	55
Franziska Reng	Half marathon	—N/a				DNF	
Anja Scherl	Half marathon	—N/a				1:13:03	17
Isabell Teegen	Half marathon	—N/a				1:16:32	51
Melina Tränkle	Half marathon	—N/a				DNF	
German team	Half marathon	—N/a				3:46:50	14

Field Events

Athlete	Event	Qualification		Final	
Athlete	Event	Distance	Rank	Distance	Rank
Marie-Laurence Jungfleisch	High jump	1.89	5 q	1.93 =SB	5
Annika Roloff	Pole vault	4.35	=11 q	4.35	11
Lisa Ryzih	Pole vault	4.45	2 q	4.70	2nd place, silver medalist(s)
Martina Strutz	Pole vault	4.45	=4 q	4.45	10
Nadja Käther	Long jump	6.46	11 q	6.48w	9
Malaika Mihambo	Long jump	6.76 SB	2 Q	6.65	3rd place, bronze medalist(s)
Alexandra Wester	Long jump	6.53	5 q	6.51	7
Jenny Elbe	Triple jump	14.24	2 Q	14.08	7
Kristin Gierisch	Triple jump	14.05	5 Q	14.03	8
Sara Gambetta	Shot put	17.77	3 Q	17.95 PB	7
Christina Schwanitz	Shot put	19.02	1 Q	20.17 EL	1st place, gold medalist(s)
Lena Urbaniak	Shot put	16.83	13	did not advance	
Shanice Craft	Discus throw	64.59	4 Q	63.89	3rd place, bronze medalist(s)
Julia Fischer	Discus throw	66.20	1 Q	65.77	2nd place, silver medalist(s)
Nadine Müller	Discus throw	64.75	3 Q	62.63	4
Christin Hussong	Javelin throw	57.17	17	did not advance	
Katharina Molitor	Javelin throw	60.75	2 Q	63.20	4
Linda Stahl	Javelin throw	60.35	5 Q	65.25 SB	2nd place, silver medalist(s)
Betty Heidler	Hammer throw	71.46	2 Q	75.77 SB	2nd place, silver medalist(s)
Kathrin Klaas	Hammer throw	64.39	25	did not advance	
Charlene Woitha	Hammer throw	64.90	22	did not advance	

Combined events – Heptathlon

Athlete	Event	100H	HJ	SP	200 m	LJ	JT	800 m	Final	Rank
Anna Maiwald	Result	13.54	1.68 =SB	13.73	24.38	5.93 SB	41.87	2:14.92 PB	6020 SB	10
Anna Maiwald	Points	1044	830	776	945	828	703	894	6020 SB	10
