= Slovenia at the 2018 European Athletics Championships =

- WA code: SLO
- National federation: Athletics Federation of Slovenia
- Website: slovenska-atletika.si

in Berlin
- Competitors: 10 (4 men and 6 women) in 10 events
- Medals: Gold 0 Silver 0 Bronze 0 Total 0

European Athletics Championships appearances
- 1994; 1998; 2002; 2006; 2010; 2012; 2014; 2016; 2018; 2022; 2024

Slovenia competed at the 2018 European Athletics Championships in Berlin, Germany, from 6 to 12 August 2018. The country was represented by 10 athletes, four men and six women.

== Results ==
=== Men ===
Track & road events

| Athlete | Event | Heat | | Semifinal | | Final | |
| Athlete | Event | Result | Rank | Result | Rank | Result | Rank |
|---|---|---|---|---|---|---|---|
| Luka Janežič | 400 m | Bye | | 44.93 | 2 Q | 45.43 | 5 |
| Žan Rudolf | 800 m | 1:48.24 | 7 | Did not advance | | | |

Field Events

| Athlete | Event | Qualification | | Final | |
| Athlete | Event | Distance | Rank | Distance | Rank |
|---|---|---|---|---|---|
| Blaž Zupančič | Shot Put | 18.83 | 25 | Did not advance | |
| Nejc Pleško | Hammer Throw | 68.29 | 29 | Did not advance | |

=== Women ===
Track & road events

| Athlete | Event | Heat | | Semifinal | | Final | |
| Athlete | Event | Result | Rank | Result | Rank | Result | Rank |
|---|---|---|---|---|---|---|---|
| Anita Horvat | 400 m | Bye | | 51.89 | 4 | Did not advance | |
| Maruša Mišmaš | 3000 m steeplechase | 9:34.28 NR | 6 q | — | | 9:34.50 | 11 |

Field Events

| Athlete | Event | Qualification | | Final | |
| Athlete | Event | Distance | Rank | Distance | Rank |
|---|---|---|---|---|---|
| Tina Šutej | pole vault | 4.20 | 25 | Did not advance | |
| Neja Filipič | long jump | NM | - | Did not advance | |
| Veronika Domjan | Discus Throw | 49.89 | 27 | Did not advance | |
| Martina Ratej | Javelin Throw | 61.69 | 2 Q | 61.41 | 4 |

Key

- Q = Qualified for the next round
- q = Qualified for the next round as a fastest loser or, in field events, by position without achieving the qualifying target
- NR = National record
- N/A = Round not applicable for the event
- Bye = Athlete not required to compete in round
