= Slovenia at the 2024 European Athletics Championships =

- Flag of Slovenia
- WA code: SLO

in Rome, Italy 7 June 2024 – 12 June 2024
- Competitors: 20 (9 men and 11 women)
- Medals Ranked 17th: Gold 1 Silver 0 Bronze 0 Total 1

European Athletics Championships appearances
- 1994; 1998; 2002; 2006; 2010; 2012; 2014; 2016; 2018; 2022; 2024; 2026

Slovenia competed at the 2024 European Athletics Championships in Rome, Italy from 7–12 June 2024.

== Medallists ==
Medal	Name	Event	Date
Gold	Kristjan Čeh	Men's discus throw	7 June

== Results ==
Slovakia entered the following athletes.

Key

- Q = Qualified for the next round
- q = Qualified for the next round as a fastest loser or, in field events, by position without achieving the qualifying target
- NR = National record
- PB = Personal best
- SB = Season best
- N/A = Round not applicable for the event

=== Men ===
Track and road events

Athlete	Event	Heat		Semifinal		Final	
Athlete	Event	Result	Rank	Result	Rank	Result	Rank
Anej Čurin Prapotnik	100 metres	10.34	10 q	10.44	21	Did not advance	
Andrej Skočir	200 metres	21.08	19	Did not advance			
Rok Ferlan	400 metres	45.52 PB	5 q	45.63	15	Did not advance	
Primož Kobe	Half marathon	—N/a				1:07:30	52
Filip Jakob Demšar	110 metres hurdles	13.67	4 q	13.59 PB	11	Did not advance	
Matic Ian Guček	400 metres hurdles	Bye		48.34 NR	3 Q	48.87	7
Jernej Gumilar; Matevž Šuštaršič; Andrej Skočir; Anej Čurin Prapotnik	4 × 100 metres relay	DNF		—N/a		Did not advance	

Field events

Athlete	Event	Qualification		Final	
Athlete	Event	Distance	Position	Distance	Position
Kristjan Čeh	Discus throw	65.64	2 q	68.08	1st place, gold medalist(s)

=== Women ===
Track and road events

Athlete	Event	Heat		Semifinal		Final	
Athlete	Event	Result	Rank	Result	Rank	Result	Rank
Anita Horvat	800 metres	2:00.73	5 q	2:04.30	16	Did not advance	
Klara Lukan	10,000 metres	—N/a				31:34.90	5
Liza Šajn	10,000 metres	—N/a				34:13.15	27
Anja Fink	Half marathon	—N/a				1:16:24 SB	57
Nika Glojnarič	100 metres hurdles	13.21	10 q	13.15	22	Did not advance	
Agata Zupin	400 metres hurdles	57.83	21	Did not advance			

Field events

Athlete	Event	Qualification		Final	
Athlete	Event	Distance	Position	Distance	Position
Lia Apostolovski	High jump	1.89	7 q	1.90	9
Tina Šutej	Pole vault	NM		Did not advance	
Neja Filipič	Long jump	6.53 SB	18	Did not advance	
Neja Filipič	Triple jump	13.98	10 q	14.12	7
Eva Pepelnak	Triple jump	DNS		Did not advance	
Martina Ratej	Javelin throw	56.34 SB	16	Did not advance	
