= France at the 2016 European Athletics Championships =

- WA code: FRA
- National federation: FFA

in Amsterdam
- Competitors: 61 (31 men and 30 women) in 31 events
- Medals Ranked 6th: Gold 2 Silver 5 Bronze 3 Total 10

European Athletics Championships appearances (overview)
- 1934; 1938; 1946; 1950; 1954; 1958; 1962; 1966; 1969; 1971; 1974; 1978; 1982; 1986; 1990; 1994; 1998; 2002; 2006; 2010; 2012; 2014; 2016; 2018; 2022; 2024

France competed at the 2016 European Athletics Championships in Amsterdam, Netherlands, between 6 and 10 July 2016. A delegation of 61 athletes were sent to represent the country.

== Medals ==
Medal	C O C K	Event	Date
Gold	Mahiedine Mekhissi-Benabbad	Men's 3000 metres steeplechase	8 July
Gold	Dimitri Bascou	Men's 110 metres hurdles	9 July
Silver	Floria Gueï	Women's 400 metres	8 July
Silver	Antoinette Nana Djimou	Women's heptathlon	9 July
Silver	Rénelle Lamote	Women's 800 metres	9 July
Silver	French team (Marvin René, Stuart Dutamby, Mickael-Meba Zeze, Jimmy Vicaut)	Men's 4 × 100 metres relay	10 July
Silver	French team (Phara Anacharsis, Elea-Mariama Diarra, Marie Gayot, Floria Gueï, Brigitte Ntiamoah, Agnès Raharolahy)	Women's 4 × 400 metres relay	10 July
Bronze	Jimmy Vicaut	Men's 100 metres	7 July
Bronze	Yoann Kowal	Men's 3000 metres steeplechase	8 July
Bronze	Wilhem Belocian	Men's 110 metres hurdles	9 July

== Results ==
Men

Track & road events

Athlete	Event	Heat		Semifinal		Final	
Athlete	Event	Result	Rank	Result	Rank	Result	Rank
Stuart Dutamby	100 m	—N/a		10.26	13	did not advance	
Jimmy Vicaut	100 m	—N/a		10.03	1 Q	10.08	3rd place, bronze medalist(s)
Mickael-Meba Zeze	200 m	20.84	7 Q	20.81	12	did not advance	
Mame-Ibra Anne	400 m	46.73	5 Q	45.39 SB	6 q	45.75	7
Thomas Jordier	400 m	47.14	14 Q	46.24	17	did not advance	
Pierre-Ambroise Bosse	800 m	1:48.35	6 Q	1:46.45	2 Q	1:45.79	5
Sofiane Selmouni	800 m	1:51.32	27	did not advance			
Bryan Cantero	1500 m	3:43.65	23	—N/a		did not advance	
Florian Carvalho	1500 m	3:39.73	3 Q	—N/a		3:47.32	5
Mourad Amdouni	1500 m	3:42.64	14 Q	—N/a		3:51.61	13
Mourad Amdouni	5000 m	—N/a				13:40.94	5
Dimitri Bascou	110 m hurdles	—N/a		13.20 SB	1 Q	13.25	1st place, gold medalist(s)
Wilhem Belocian	110 m hurdles	—N/a		13.28 =SB	2 Q	13.33	3rd place, bronze medalist(s)
Aurel Manga	110 m hurdles	—N/a		13.36	6 Q	13.47	6
Mamadou Kassé Hann	400 m hurdles	—N/a		49.28	8	did not advance	
Djilali Bedrani	3000 m steeplechase	8:57.27	22	—N/a		did not advance	
Yoann Kowal	3000 m steeplechase	8:33.51	10 Q	—N/a		8:30.79	3rd place, bronze medalist(s)
Mahiedine Mekhissi-Benabbad	3000 m steeplechase	8:31.42	1 Q	—N/a		8:25.63	1st place, gold medalist(s)
Stuart Dutamby; Marvin René; Mickael-Meba Zeze; Jimmy Vicaut	4 × 100 m relay	38.85 SB	6 Q	—N/a		38.38 SB	2nd place, silver medalist(s)
Alexandre Divet; Mamadou Kassé Hann; Ludvy Vaillant; Thomas Jordier	4 × 400 m relay	3:04.95	12	—N/a		did not advance	
Hassan Chahdi	Half marathon	—N/a				1:03:43	7
Romain Courcieres	Half marathon	—N/a				1:08:42	66
Yohan Durand	Half marathon	—N/a				1:07:32	53
French team	Half marathon	—N/a				3:19:57	11

Field Events

Athlete	Event	Qualification		Final	
Athlete	Event	Distance	Rank	Distance	Rank
Stanley Joseph	Pole vault	5.50	=2 q	5.30	13
Renaud Lavillenie	Pole vault	5.60	1 q	NM	
Kévin Menaldo	Pole vault	5.50	=9 q	NM	
Kafétien Gomis	Long jump	7.93w	=8 q	7.84	7
Benjamin Compaoré	Triple jump	16.53	9 q	16.12	12
Harold Correa	Triple jump	16.33	14	did not advance	

Combined events – Decathlon

Athlete	Event	100 m	LJ	SP	HJ	400 m	110H	DT	PV	JT	1500 m	Final	Rank
Romain Barras	Result	11.19	7.04	15.54 SB	1.98 SB	50.57	14.66	43.88	4.80 =SB	59.63 SB	4:29.59 SB	8002	6
Romain Barras	Points	819	823	823	785	789	891	744	849	732	747	8002	6
Florian Geffrouais	Result	11.30	6.91	14.32	1.80	50.34	DNF	42.20	4.90	52.43	4:29.50	6723	18
Florian Geffrouais	Points	795	792	748	627	799	0	709	880	625	748	6723	18

Women

Track & road events

Athlete	Event	Heat		Semifinal		Final	
Athlete	Event	Result	Rank	Result	Rank	Result	Rank
Stella Akakpo	100 m	—N/a		DQ		did not advance	
Jennifer Galais	100 m	11.64	15 Q	11.62	17	did not advance	
Floriane Gnafoua	100 m	—N/a		11.32	7 q	11.36	7
Floria Gueï	400 m	—N/a		51.01	2 Q	51.21	2nd place, silver medalist(s)
Justine Fedronic	800 m	DNS		did not advance			
Rénelle Lamote	800 m	2:01.60	1 Q	1:59.87	1 Q	2:00.19	2nd place, silver medalist(s)
Christelle Daunay	10,000 m	—N/a				33:03.36	13
Cindy Billaud	100 m hurdles	—N/a		12.91	5 q	13.29	7
Sandra Gomis	100 m hurdles	—N/a		12.97	9	did not advance	
Phara Anacharsis	400 m hurdles	56.95	5 Q	57.05	16	did not advance	
Aurélie Chaboudez	400 m hurdles	56.69	3 Q	57.50	20	did not advance	
Maëva Contion	400 m hurdles	58.31	19	did not advance			
Maeva Danois	3000 m steeplechase	9:58.73	21	—N/a		did not advance	
Stella Akakpo; Céline Distel-Bonnet; Jennifer Galais; Floriane Gnafoua	4 × 100 m relay	43.06 SB	5 q	—N/a		43.05 SB	6
Phara Anacharsis (only final); Elea-Mariama Diarra (only heat); Marie Gayot; Floria Gueï (only final); Brigitte Ntiamoah; Agnès Raharolahy (only heat)	4 × 400 m relay	3:28.38 SB	5 Q	—N/a		3:25.96 SB	2nd place, silver medalist(s)
Sophie Duarte	Half marathon	—N/a				1:15:59	47
Jacqueline Gandar	Half marathon	—N/a				1:13:00	16
Séverine Hamel	Half marathon	—N/a				DNF	
Laurane Picoche	Half marathon	—N/a				1:15:24	41
Fanny Pruvost	Half marathon	—N/a				1:17:19	57
French team	Half marathon	—N/a				3:44:23	10

Field Events

Athlete	Event	Qualification		Final	
Athlete	Event	Distance	Rank	Distance	Rank
Jeanine Assani Issouf	Triple jump	13.80	13	did not advance	
Rouguy Diallo	Triple jump	13.58	18	did not advance	
Pauline Pousse	Discus throw	60.06	10 Q	59.62	8
Mélina Robert-Michon	Discus throw	63.99	5 Q	62.47	5
Matilde Andraud	Javelin throw	55.28	20	did not advance	
Alexandra Tavernier	Hammer throw	NM		did not advance	

Combined events – Heptathlon

Athlete	Event	100H	HJ	SP	200 m	LJ	JT	800 m	Final	Rank
Antoinette Nana Djimou	Result	13.26 SB	1.71	16.17 PB	24.92	6.31 SB	51.72 SB	2:19.33 SB	6458 SB	2nd place, silver medalist(s)
Antoinette Nana Djimou	Points	1086	867	939	894	946	893	833	6458 SB	2nd place, silver medalist(s)
