= Great Britain at the 2016 European Athletics Championships =

Great Britain and Northern Ireland at the 2016 European Athletics Championships
- WA code: GBR
- National federation: UKA
- Website: www.britishathletics.org.uk

in Amsterdam
- Competitors: 89 (46 men and 43 women) in 39 events
- Medals Ranked 3rd: Gold 5 Silver 3 Bronze 8 Total 16

European Athletics Championships appearances
- 1934; 1938; 1946; 1950; 1954; 1958; 1962; 1966; 1969; 1971; 1974; 1978; 1982; 1986; 1990; 1994; 1998; 2002; 2006; 2010; 2012; 2014; 2016; 2018; 2022; 2024; 2026

Great Britain competed at the 2016 European Athletics Championships in Amsterdam, Netherlands, from 6–10 July 2016. British Athletics named a team of 98 athletes on 27 June 2016. On 4 July 2016 British Athletics confirmed that Adam Gemili would stand down from the 100m, and concentrate on the relay; his place was taken by reserve Ojie Edoburun. William Sharman also withdrew, his place taken by David King.

== Medals ==
Medal	Name	Event	Date
Gold	Dina Asher-Smith	Women's 200 metres	7 July
Gold	Greg Rutherford	Men's long jump	7 July
Gold	Martyn Rooney	Men's 400 metres	8 July
Gold	British team James Dasaolu; James Ellington; Adam Gemili; Chijindu Ujah	Men's 4 × 100 metres relay	10 July
Gold	British team Seren Bundy-Davies; Emily Diamond; Eilidh Doyle; Anyika Onuora	Women's 4 × 400 metres relay	10 July
Silver	Jazmin Sawyers	Women's long jump	10 July
Silver	British team Dina Asher-Smith; Daryll Neita; Asha Philip; Bianca Williams	Women's 4 × 100 metres relay	10 July
Silver	Robert Grabarz	Men's high jump	10 July
Bronze	Tiffany Porter	Women's 100 metres hurdles	7 July
Bronze	Anyika Onuora	Women's 400 metres	8 July
Bronze	Danny Talbot	Men's 200 metres	8 July
Bronze	Julian Reid	Men's triple jump	9 July
Bronze	Stephanie Twell	Women's 5000 metres	9 July
Bronze	Chris Baker	Men's high jump	10 July
Bronze	British team Jack Green; Matthew Hudson-Smith; Delano Williams; Rabah Yousif	Men's 4 × 400 metres relay	10 July
Bronze	Elliot Giles	Men's 800 metres	10 July

== Results ==
=== Men ===
Track & road events

Athlete	Event	Heat		Semifinal		Final	
Athlete	Event	Result	Rank	Result	Rank	Result	Rank
James Ellington	100 m	Bye		10.04 PB	=2 Q	10.19	5
Ojie Edoburun	100 m	10.24	=2 Q	10.20	10	did not advance	
Richard Kilty	100 m	10.24	=2 Q	10.15	6 Q	DQ	
Danny Talbot	200 m	Bye		20.37 SB	1 Q	20.56	3rd place, bronze medalist(s)
Zharnel Hughes	200 m	21.21	18	did not advance			
Nethaneel Mitchell-Blake	200 m	Bye		20.46	5 q	20.60	5
Jarryd Dunn	400 m	46.05	1 Q	46.00 SB	14	did not advance	
Martyn Rooney	400 m	46.57	4 Q	45.04 SB	1 Q	45.29	1st place, gold medalist(s)
Elliot Giles	800 m	1:50.31	21 Q	1.47.31	7 Q	1:45:54 PB	3rd place, bronze medalist(s)
Jamie Webb	800 m	1:53.75	29	did not advance			
Jake Wightman	1500 m	3:39.32	1 Q	—N/a		3:47.68	7
Lee Emanuel	1500 m	3:42.92	16 Q	—N/a		3:47.57	6
Tom Lancashire	1500 m	3:42.08	11	—N/a		did not advance	
Jonathan Taylor	5000 m	—N/a				13:55.20	13
Jonathan Davies	5000 m	—N/a				14:04.13	16
Dewi Griffiths	10000 m	—N/a				28:28.55	5
Andy Vernon	10000 m	—N/a				DNS	
Lawrence Clarke	110 m hurdles	Bye		13.47	10	did not advance	
David King	110 m hurdles	13.55	3 Q	13.54 =PB	15	did not advance	
Andrew Pozzi	110 m hurdles	Bye		13.31 =PB	4 Q	DNS	
Tom Burton	400 m hurdles	Bye		49.71	14	did not advance	
Rhys Williams	400 m hurdles	Bye		49.22 =SB	7 Q	49.63	5
Jack Green	400 m hurdles	Bye		48.98 SB	8 q	DNF	
Rob Mullett	3000 m steeplechase	8:32.06	4 Q	—N/a		8:33.29	6
James Dasaolu; Adam Gemili; James Ellington; Chijindu Ujah	4 × 100 m relay	38.12 EL	1 Q	—N/a		38.17	1st place, gold medalist(s)
Rabah Yousif; Delano Williams; Nigel Levine (only heat); Jarryd Dunn (only heat); Matthew Hudson-Smith (only final); Jack Green (only final)	4 × 400 m relay	3:01.63 EL	1 Q	—N/a		3:01:44 SB	3rd place, bronze medalist(s)
Callum Hawkins	Half marathon	—N/a				1:03:57	9
Jonathan Hay	Half marathon	—N/a				1:10:08	77
Matthew Bond	Half marathon	—N/a				1:07:00	42
Lee Merrien	Half marathon	—N/a				1:07:29	52
British team	Half marathon	—N/a				3:18.26	9

Field Events

Athlete	Event	Qualification		Final	
Athlete	Event	Distance	Rank	Distance	Rank
Dan Bramble	Long jump	DNS		did not advance	
Greg Rutherford	Long jump	7.93	=8 q	8.25	1st place, gold medalist(s)
Julian Reid	Triple jump	16.62 SB	6 q	16.76 SB	3rd place, bronze medalist(s)
Nathan Douglas	Triple jump	16.33	15	did not advance	
Chris Baker	High jump	2.25	=1 Q	2.29 PB	3rd place, bronze medalist(s)
Robbie Grabarz	High jump	2.25	=1 Q	2.29	2nd place, silver medalist(s)
Luke Cutts	Pole vault	5.35	=17	did not advance	
Nick Miller	Hammer throw	67.76	25	did not advance	
Chris Bennett	Hammer throw	74.39	6 q	70.93	10
Mark Dry	Hammer throw	71.96	15	did not advance	

Combined events – Decathlon

Athlete	Event	100 m	LJ	SP	HJ	400 m	110H	DT	PV	JT	1500 m	Final	Rank
Ashley Bryant	Result	11.12	7.56	13.74 =SB	1.89	50.15	14.68	43.62 SB	4.60 SB	70.37 SB	4:33.88	8040	5
Ashley Bryant	Points	834	950	712	705	808	889	738	790	895	719	8040	5

=== Women ===
Track & road events

Athlete	Event	Heat		Semifinal		Final	
Athlete	Event	Result	Rank	Result	Rank	Result	Rank
Asha Philip	100 m	Bye		11.37	9 Q	11.27	4
Desiree Henry	100 m	Bye		11.09	2 Q	DNF	
Dina Asher-Smith	200 m	Bye		22.57 SB	1 Q	22.37 SB	1st place, gold medalist(s)
Jodie Williams	200 m	Bye		23.14	8 q	22.96	6
Christine Ohuruogu	400 m	52.69	2 Q	51.35 SB	3 Q	51.55	4
Anyika Onuora	400 m	Bye		51.84	5 Q	51.47 SB	3rd place, bronze medalist(s)
Adelle Tracey	800 m	2:05.41	24	did not advance			
Alison Leonard	800 m	2:03.64	9 Q	2:02.31	13	did not advance	
Jenny Meadows	800 m	2:03.10	7 Q	2:03.13	17	did not advance	
Melissa Courtney	1500 m	4:18.74	18	—N/a		did not advance	
Sarah McDonald	1500 m	4:11.14	4 Q	—N/a		4:34.93	9
Stephanie Twell	5000 m	—N/a				15:20.70	3rd place, bronze medalist(s)
Laura Whittle	5000 m	—N/a				15:24.18	5
Eilish McColgan	5000 m	—N/a				15:28.53	6
Jo Pavey	10000 m	—N/a				31:34.61 SB	5
Jess Andrews	10000 m	—N/a				31.38.02 PB	7
Tiffany Porter	100 m hurdles	Bye		12.97	9 Q	12.76	3rd place, bronze medalist(s)
Lucy Hatton	100 m hurdles	13.37	18	did not advance			
Serita Solomon	100 m hurdles	13.39	19	did not advance			
Lennie Waite	3000 m steeplechase	9:48.46	16	—N/a		did not advance	
Rosie Clarke	3000 m steeplechase	10:00.25	23	—N/a		did not advance	
Alyson Dixon	Half marathon	—N/a				1:12:47 SB	13
Tina Muir	Half marathon	—N/a				1:17:23	59
Charlotte Purdue	Half marathon	—N/a				DNF	
Gemma Steel	Half marathon	—N/a				1:12.19	10
Lily Partridge	Half marathon	—N/a				1:16:57	53
British team	Half marathon	—N/a				3:42:03	7
Asha Philip; Dina Asher-Smith; Daryll Neita; Bianca Williams	4 × 100 m relay	42.59 SB	1 Q	—N/a		42.45 SB	2nd place, silver medalist(s)
Anyika Onuora (only final); Seren Bundy-Davies; Emily Diamond (only final); Eilidh Doyle; Margaret Adeoye (only heat); Kelly Massey (only heat)	4 × 400 m relay	3:26.42 EL	1 Q	—N/a		3:25.05 WL	1st place, gold medalist(s)

Field Events

Athlete	Event	Qualification		Final	
Athlete	Event	Distance	Rank	Distance	Rank
Jazmin Sawyers	Long jump	6.49	7 q	6.86w	2nd place, silver medalist(s)
Shara Proctor	Long jump	DNS		did not advance	
Lorraine Ugen	Long jump	6.33w	18	did not advance	
Laura Samuel	Triple jump	13.65	15	did not advance	
Isobel Pooley	High jump	1.85	=16	did not advance	
Jade Lally	Discus throw	58.76	15 Q	60.29	7
Sophie Hitchon	Hammer throw	69.48	6 q	71.74	4
Goldie Sayers	Javelin throw	53.56	26	did not advance	
Rachel Wallader	Shot Put	16.86	12 q	16.06	12

Combined events – Heptathlon

Athlete	Event	100H	HJ	SP	200 m	LJ	JT	800 m	Final	Rank
Morgan Lake	Result	14.72	1.89	13.24 SB	DNS	—	—	—	DNF	
Morgan Lake	Points	879	1093	743	0	—	—	—	DNF	

Key

- Q = Qualified for the next round
- q = Qualified for the next round as a fastest loser or, in field events, by position without achieving the qualifying target
- N/A = Round not applicable for the event
- Bye = Athlete not required to compete in round
