= Slovenia at the 2022 European Athletics Championships =

- Flag of Slovenia
- WA code: SLO
- National federation: Athletic Federation of Slovenia

in Munich, Germany 15 August 2022 – 21 August 2022
- Competitors: 20 (8 men and 12 women) in 15 events
- Medals Ranked 25th: Gold 0 Silver 1 Bronze 1 Total 2

European Athletics Championships appearances
- 1994; 1998; 2002; 2006; 2010; 2012; 2014; 2016; 2018; 2022; 2024

Slovenia competed at the 2022 European Athletics Championships in Munich, Germany, between 15 and 21 August 2022

== Medallists ==
Medal	Name	Event	Date
Silver	Kristjan Čeh	Men's discus throw	19 August
Bronze	Tina Šutej	Women's pole vault	17 August

== Results ==
Slovenia entered the following athletes.

Key

- Q = Qualified for the next round
- q = Qualified for the next round as a fastest loser or, in field events, by position without achieving the qualifying target
- NR = National record
- PB = Personal best
- SB = Season best
- N/A = Round not applicable for the event

=== Men ===
Track and road events

Athlete	Event	Heat		Semifinal		Final	
Athlete	Event	Result	Rank	Result	Rank	Result	Rank
Jan Vukovič	800 m	1:48.88	31	Did not advance			
Matic Ian Guček	400 m hurdles	Bye		49.93	18	Did not advance	
Primož Kobe	Marathon	—				2:29:23	61
Jure Grkman; Lovro Mesec Košir; Matic Ian Guček; Rok Ferlan	4 × 400 m relay	3:03.68 SB	11	—		Did not advance	

Field events

Athlete	Event	Qualification		Final	
Athlete	Event	Distance	Position	Distance	Position
Robert Renner	Pole vault	5.30	20	Did not advance	
Kristjan Čeh	Dscus throw	69.06 CR	1 Q	68.28	2nd place, silver medalist(s)

=== Women ===
Track and road events

Athlete	Event	Heat		Semifinal		Final	
Athlete	Event	Result	Rank	Result	Rank	Result	Rank
Jerneja Smonkar	800 m	2:03.24	16	Did not advance			
Veronika Sadek	800 m	2:04.57	26	Did not advance			
Agata Zupin; Aneja Simončič; Maja Pogorevc; Anita Horvat	4 × 400 m relay	3:31.57	13	—		Did not advance	
Joni Tomičič Prezelj	100 m hurdles	13.68	21	Did not advance			
Agata Zupin	400 m hurdles	57.42	20	Did not advance			
Maruša Mišmaš-Zrimšek	3000 m steeplechase	9:46.06	9 q	—		9:53.81	15

Field events

Athlete	Event	Qualification		Final	
Athlete	Event	Distance	Position	Distance	Position
Lia Apostolovski	High jump	1.87	1 q	1.90	7
Tina Šutej	Pole vault	4.50	1 q	4.75	3rd place, bronze medalist(s)
Neja Filipič	Triple jump	NM		Did not advance	
Martina Ratej	Javelin throw	58.86 SB	7 q	59.36 SB	5
