= Serkan Kaya =

Serkan Kaya may refer to:

- Serkan Kaya (athlete) (born 1984), Turkish long-distance runner
- Serkan Kaya (singer) (born 1977), Turkish singer, songwriter and composer
- Serkan Kaya (actor) (born 1977), Turkish-German actor
