= Slovenia at the 2016 European Athletics Championships =

- WA code: SLO

European Athletics Championships appearances
- 1994; 1998; 2002; 2006; 2010; 2012; 2014; 2016; 2018; 2022; 2024

Slovenia competed at the 2016 European Athletics Championships in Amsterdam, Netherlands, between 6 and 10 July 2016.
