= Darya Mykhaylova =

Ukrainian long-distance runner

Darya Mykhaylova Dariia Mykhailova
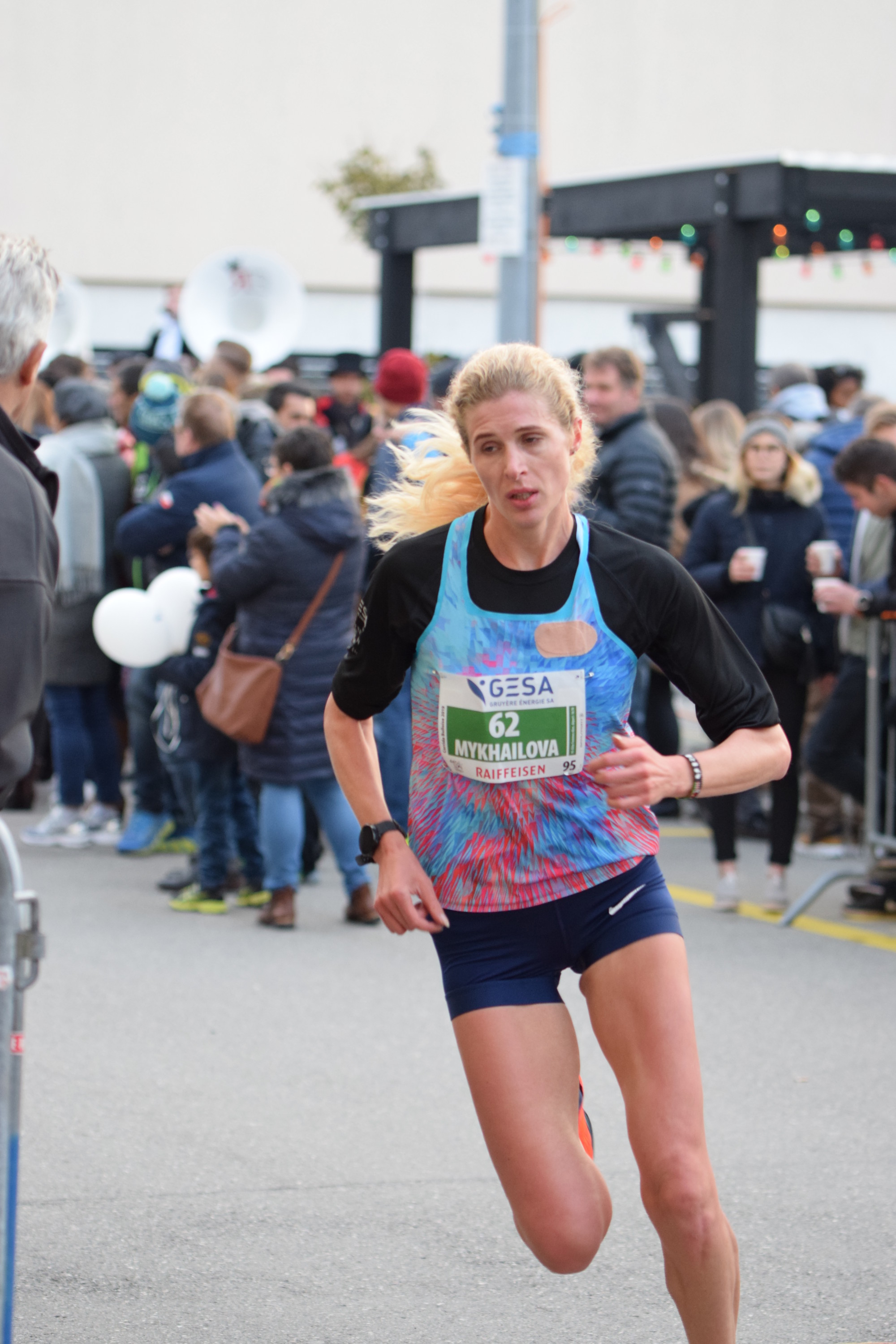
- Darya Mykhaylova in 2019

Personal information
- Born: 29 April 1989 (age 37) Bakhmach, Ukrainian SSR, Soviet Union

Sport
- Country: Ukraine
- Sport: Long-distance running

Darya Mykhaylova or Dariia Mykhailova (Ukrainian: Дар'я Михайлова; born 29 April 1989 Bakhmach) is a Ukrainian long-distance runner. She competed in the women's marathon at the 2020 Summer Olympics held in Tokyo, Japan.

== Career ==
In 2016, she competed in the women's half marathon at the European Athletics Championships held in Amsterdam, Netherlands. She finished in 54th place.

She represented Ukraine at the 2017 World Championships in Athletics held in London, United Kingdom in the women's marathon. She finished in 44th place.

She finished in 25th place in the women's marathon at the 2018 European Athletics Championships held in Berlin, Germany.

In 2019, she competed in the senior women's race at the IAAF World Cross Country Championships held in Aarhus, Denmark. She finished in 24th place. In the same year, she won the Balkan Half Marathon Championships held in Kyiv, Ukraine. In 2019, she also competed in the women's event at the 2019 European 10,000m Cup held in London, United Kingdom.

In 2020, she won the women's race at the Granollers Half Marathon held in Granollers, Catalonia, Spain. In the same year, she finished in 9th place in the 2020 London Marathon in London, United Kingdom.
