= Jacqueline Gandar =

French long-distance runner

Personal information
- Born: 17 June 1994 (age 31)

Sport
- Country: France
- Event: Long-distance running

Jacqueline Gandar (born 17 June 1994) is a French long-distance runner.

In 2016, she competed in the women's half marathon at the 2016 European Athletics Championships held in Amsterdam, Netherlands.

In 2018, she competed in the women's half marathon at the 2018 IAAF World Half Marathon Championships held in Valencia, Spain. She finished in 81st place.
