= Gugl Indoor Meeting =

The Gugl-Meeting Indoor is an annual athletics meeting at the TipsArena in Linz, Austria, which was founded in 2005.

== Meeting records ==
=== Men ===
Men's meeting records of the Gugl Indoor Meeting
Event	Record	Athlete	Nationality	Date	Ref.
60 m	6.51				
200 m	20.90				
400 m	46.32	Luka Janežič	Slovenia	12 February 2016	
800 m	1:46.96	Žan Rudolf	Slovenia	31 January 2013	
1000 m	2:28.46				
1500 m	3:40.87				
3000 m	7:45.57	Elzan Bibić	Serbia	8 February 2020	
60 m hurdles	7.49				
High jump	2.31 m	Jamal Wilson	Bahamas	12 February 2016	
Pole vault	5.83 m	Konstadinos Filippidis	Greece	31 January 2013	
Long jump	8.11 m				
Triple jump	16.37 m	Tobia Bocchi	Italy	8 February 2020	
Shot put	20.64 m	Asmir Kolašinac	Serbia	2 February 2012	

=== Women ===
Women's meeting records of the Gugl Indoor Meeting
Event	Record	Athlete	Nationality	Date	Ref.
60 m	7.17	Merlene Ottey	Jamaica	2003	
200 m	22.95	Juliet Campbell	Cuba	2003	
400 m	52.21	Jessie Knight	United Kingdom	8 February 2020	
800 m	2:00.91	Stephanie Graf	Austria	2003	
1500 m	4:10.61	Maruša Mišmaš	Slovenia	9 February 2019	
3000 m	9:29.10	Lucie Sekanova	Czechoslovakia	2 February 2012	
60 m hurdles	7.94	Alina Talay	Belarus	6 February 2015	
High jump	2.00 m	Marina Kuptsova	Russia	2003	
Pole vault	4.40 m	Kira Grünberg	Austria	6 February 2015	
Long jump	6.77 m	Yargelis Savigne	Cuba	2008	
Shot put	19.58 m	Christina Schwanitz	Germany	31 January 2013	
