= Croatia at the 2016 European Athletics Championships =

- WA code: CRO
- National federation: HAS
- Website: www.has.hr

in Amsterdam
- Competitors: 11 (5 men and 6 women) in 9 events
- Medals Ranked 14th: Gold 1 Silver 0 Bronze 1 Total 2

European Athletics Championships appearances
- 1994; 1998; 2002; 2006; 2010; 2012; 2014; 2016; 2018; 2022; 2024; 2026

Croatia competed at the 2016 European Athletics Championships in Amsterdam, Netherlands, between 6 and 10 July 2016. It was represented by 11 athletes, 5 male and 6 female. Sandra Perković won gold in discus throw and Sara Kolak bronze in javelin throw.

== Medals ==
Medal	Name	Event	Date
Gold	Sandra Perković	Women's discus throw	8 July
Bronze	Sara Kolak	Women's javelin throw	9 July

== Results ==
Men

Track & road events

Athlete	Event	Heat		Semifinal		Final	
Athlete	Event	Result	Rank	Result	Rank	Result	Rank
Mateo Ružić	400 m	46.89	7 Q	47.19	23	did not advance	

Field Events

Athlete	Event	Qualification		Final	
Athlete	Event	Distance	Rank	Distance	Rank
Ivan Horvat	Pole vault	5.50	6 Q	5.30	7
Filip Mihaljević	Shot put	18.72	22	did not advance	
Nedžad Mulabegović	Shot put	19.55	15	did not advance	
Stipe Žunić	Shot put	20.24	6 q	19.95	9

Women

Track & road events

Athlete	Event	Heat		Semifinal		Final	
Athlete	Event	Result	Rank	Result	Rank	Result	Rank
Ivana Lončarek	100 m hurdles	13.27	15	did not advance			
Alena Hrušoci	400 m hurdles	58.98	21	did not advance			

Field Events

Athlete	Event	Qualification		Final	
Athlete	Event	Distance	Rank	Distance	Rank
Ana Šimić	High jump	1.89	14	did not advance	
Valentina Mužarić	Shot put	16.17	19	did not advance	
Sandra Perković	Discus throw	65.25	2 Q	69.97	1st place, gold medalist(s)
Sara Kolak	Javelin throw	60.51	3 Q	63.50 NR	3rd place, bronze medalist(s)
