= Portugal at the 2016 European Athletics Championships =

- WA code: POR
- National federation: Portuguese Athletics Federation
- Website: www.fpatletismo.pt

in Amsterdam, Netherlands
- Competitors: 33 (16 men, 17 women) in 18 events
- Medals Ranked 7th: Gold 3 Silver 1 Bronze 2 Total 6

European Athletics Championships appearances
- 1934; 1938; 1946; 1950; 1954; 1958; 1962; 1966; 1969; 1971; 1974; 1978; 1982; 1986; 1990; 1994; 1998; 2002; 2006; 2010; 2012; 2014; 2016; 2018; 2022; 2024

Portugal competed at the 2016 European Athletics Championships in Amsterdam, Netherlands, between 6 and 10 July 2016. On 27 June 2016, the Portuguese Athletics Federation announced the list of 33 athletes taking part in the championships, which included 16 men and 17 women.

== Medalists ==
Medal	Name	Event	Date
Gold	Sara Moreira	Women's half marathon	10 July
Gold	Sara Moreira; Jéssica Augusto; Ana Dulce Félix; Marisa Barros; Vanessa Fernandes	Women's half marathon (team)	10 July
Gold	Patrícia Mamona	Women's triple jump	10 July
Silver	Ana Dulce Félix	Women's 10000 m	6 July
Bronze	Jéssica Augusto	Women's half marathon	10 July
Bronze	Tsanko Arnaudov	Men's shot put	10 July

== Results ==
Key

- Note – Ranks given for track events are within the athlete's heat only
- Q = Qualified for the next round
- q = Qualified for the next round as a fastest loser or, in field events, by position without achieving the qualifying target
- NR = National record
- N/A = Round not applicable for the event
- Bye = Athlete not required to compete in round

=== Men ===
Track & road events

Athlete	Event	Heat		Semifinal		Final	
Athlete	Event	Result	Rank	Result	Rank	Result	Rank
Diogo Antunes	100 m	10.51	5	Did not advance			
Carlos Nascimento	100 m	10.54	7	Did not advance			
David Lima	200 m	20.82	2 Q	20.86	7	Did not advance	
Hélio Gomes	1500 m	3:46.66	11	—N/a		Did not advance	
David Lima; Ancuiam Lopes; Carlos Nascimento; Francis Obikwelu	4 × 100 m relay	39.51	5	—N/a		Did not advance	
Samuel Barata	Half marathon	—N/a				1:08:30	63
José Moreira	Half marathon	—N/a				1:07:17	49
Rui Pinto	Half marathon	—N/a				1:06:28	35
Rui Pedro Silva	Half marathon	—N/a				1:10:04	76
Pedro Ribeiro	Half marathon	—N/a				Did not finish	
National team	Half marathon	—N/a				3:22:15	13

Field events

Athlete	Event	Qualification		Final	
Athlete	Event	Distance	Rank	Distance	Rank
Nelson Évora	Triple jump	16.27	17	Did not advance	
Diogo Ferreira	Pole vault	5.35	=19	Did not advance	
Tsanko Arnaudov	Shot put	20.42	4 Q	20.59	3rd place, bronze medalist(s)
Marco Fortes	Shot put	18.64	=23	Did not advance	

=== Women ===
Track & road events

Athlete	Event	Heat		Semifinal		Final	
Athlete	Event	Result	Rank	Result	Rank	Result	Rank
Lorène Bazolo	100 m	11.44	8 Q	11.57	16	Did not advance	
Cátia Azevedo	400 m	Bye		52.46	12	Did not advance	
Marta Pen	1500 m	4:13.74	13 Q	—N/a		4:34.41	5
Ana Dulce Félix	10000 m	—N/a				31:19.03 PB	2nd place, silver medalist(s)
Carla Salomé Rocha	10000 m	—N/a				32:57.44	12
Sara Moreira	10000 m	—N/a				DNF	
Vera Barbosa	400 m hurdles	57.84	14 q	57.92	24	Did not advance	
Cátia Azevedo; Dorothe Évora; Filipa Martins; Rivinilda Mentai	4 × 400 m relay	3:32.48 SB	13	—N/a		Did not advance	
Jéssica Augusto	Half marathon	—N/a				1:10:55 SB	3rd place, bronze medalist(s)
Marisa Barros	Half marathon	—N/a				1:15:53	46
Ana Dulce Félix	Half marathon	—N/a				1:12:39 SB	12
Vanessa Fernandes	Half marathon	—N/a				1:17:27	60
Sara Moreira	Half marathon	—N/a				1:10:19	1st place, gold medalist(s)
National team	Half marathon	—N/a				3:33:53	1st place, gold medalist(s)

Field events

Athlete	Event	Qualification		Final	
Athlete	Event	Distance	Rank	Distance	Rank
Marta Onofre	Pole vault	4.35	=15	Did not advance	
Susana Costa	Triple jump	13.94	8 q	14.34	5
Patrícia Mamona	Triple jump	13.87	9 q	14.58 NR	1st place, gold medalist(s)
Irina Rodrigues	Discus throw	50.40	26	Did not advance	
