= Veronica Inglese =

Italian long-distance runner

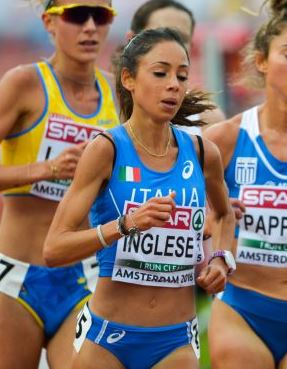
- Inglese in 2016.

Personal information
- Born: 22 November 1990 (age 35) Barletta, Italy

Sport
- Country: Italy
- Sport: Athletics
- Event: Long-distance running
- Club: C.S. Esercito
- Coached by: Fabio Martelli
Medal record
European Championships
Silver medal – second place	2016 Amsterdam	Half marathon
Silver medal – second place	2016 Amsterdam	Half marathon team
European U20 Championships
Bronze medal – third place	2009 Novi Sad	5000 m

Veronica Inglese (born 22 November 1990) is an Italian long-distance runner. She won a silver medal at the 2016 European Athletics Championships.

== Biography ==
In the 5,000m, she won the bronze medal at the 2009 European Junior Championships in Athletics. She won twelve Italian national titles, including four senior (5000m, 10 km road, cross-country and 10,000m track). She has been selected several times on the national team: at the 2011 World Championships, at the 2013 European Cross Country Championships where she finished 8th, and at the 2014 Half Marathon World Championships, among others.

On 1 May 2016, she ran in Palo Alto the 10,000m in 31:42:02, which qualifies her for the Rio Olympics, a time she adds over 5,000m, 15:22:45, 25 June 2016 in Rieti to win the national championship. On 6 July 2016, she finished 6th in the 10,000m European Championships in Amsterdam, beating her personal best, and on 10 July she won the half marathon silver medal behind Sara Moreira.

== National titles ==
She won four national championships at individual senior level in four different specialities.

- Italian Athletics Championships
  - 5000 m: 2016
  - 10,000 m: 2014
  - 10 km road: 2103
  - Cross-country running: 2014
