= Edwin Kipchirchir Kemboi =

Austrian marathon runner

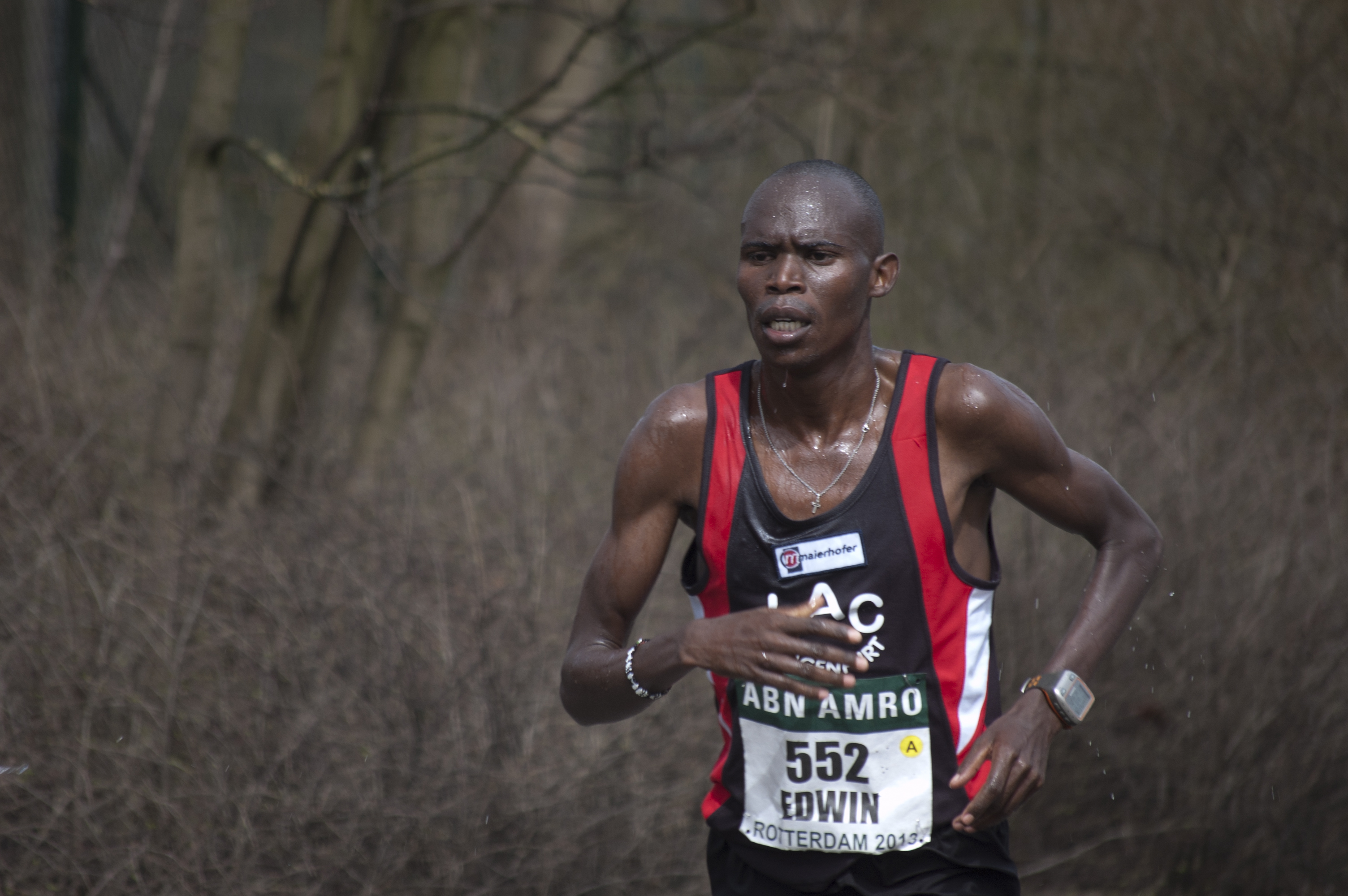
- Edwin Kipchirchir Kemboi in 2013

Personal information
- Born: 20 June 1984 (age 42)

Sport
- Country: Austria
- Sport: Track and field
- Event: long-distance running
- Updated on 29 August 2015

Edwin Kipchirchir Kemboi (born 20 June 1984) is a Kenyan born, male Austrian long-distance runner. He competed in the marathon event at the 2015 World Championships in Athletics in Beijing, China, fishing 32nd.

His personal best is 2:12:58, from the 2013 Rotterdam Marathon. He won the 2011 Graz Marathon and the 2014 Salzberg Marathon.

== See also ==
- Austria at the 2015 World Championships in Athletics
