= Žan Rudolf =

Slovenian middle-distance runner

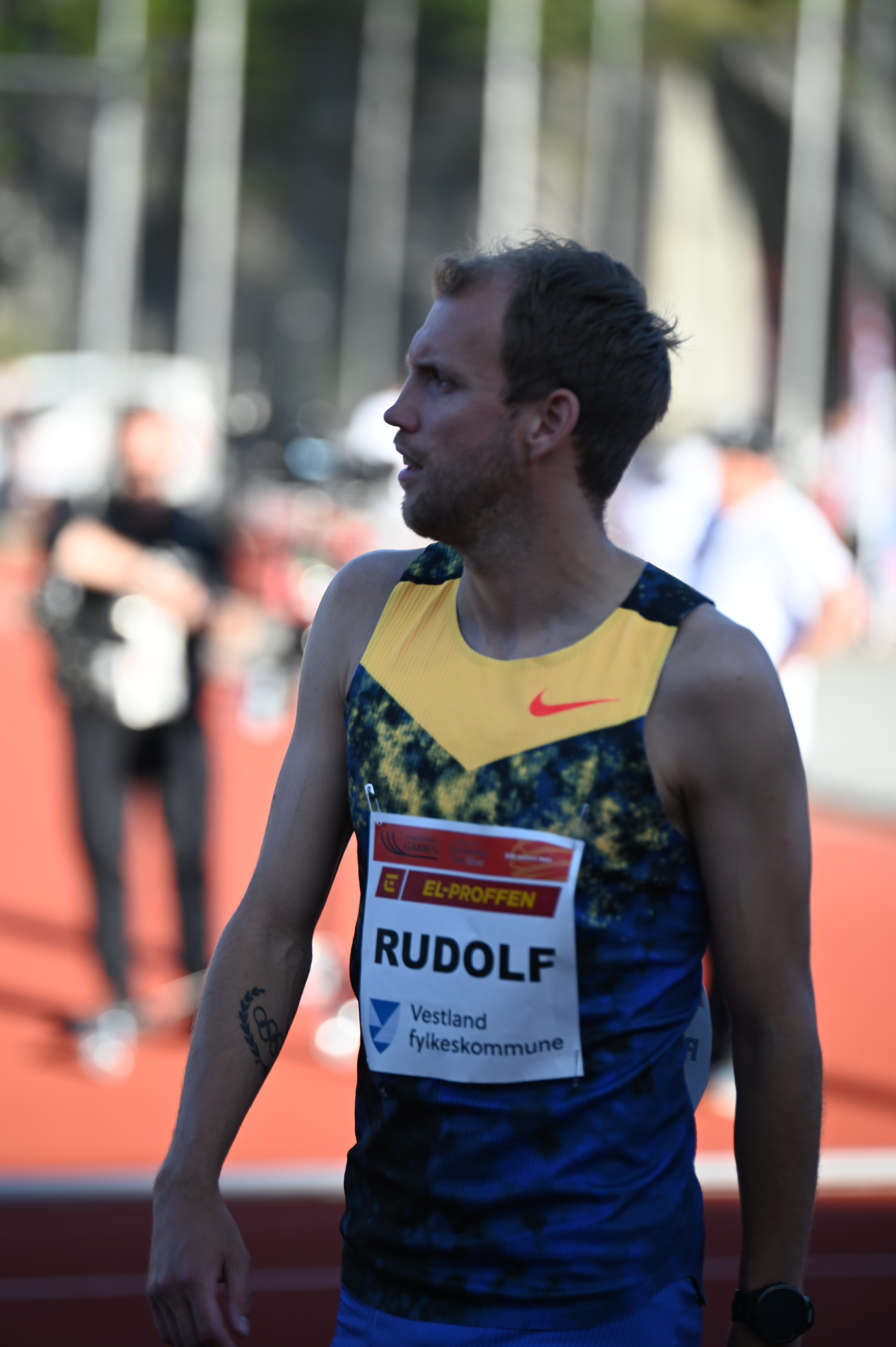
- Rudolf in 2026

Personal information
- Born: May 9, 1993 (age 33) Ljubljana, Slovenia
- Height: 1.84 m (6 ft 0 in)
- Weight: 64 kg (141 lb)

Sport
- Country: Slovenian
- Sport: Track
- Event: 800 metres

Achievements and titles
- Personal best(s): 400 metres: 47.03; 800 metres: 1:46.00
- Updated on 18-8-15

Žan Rudolf (born 9 May 1993) is a Slovenian track athlete who specializes in the 800 metres. He holds the Slovenian national record for the 800 metre discipline.

== Running career ==
Rudolf, although still a teenager, ran the 800 metres at the 2012 European Athletics Championships. It was his first senior-level major competition appearance. A month later, he ran at the 2012 World Junior Championships in Athletics, where he made it to the semi-final round in the men's 800 metres. He won the 800 metre race at the 2013 Gugl Indoor Meeting, recording a time of 1:46.96 which remains the Gugl Indoor record as of 2014. Rudolf also ran the 800 metres at the 2013 European Indoor Championships, although did not qualify past the first round.

== See also ==
- Slovenia at the 2012 European Athletics Championships
