= Christian Kreienbühl =

Swiss athlete (born 1981)

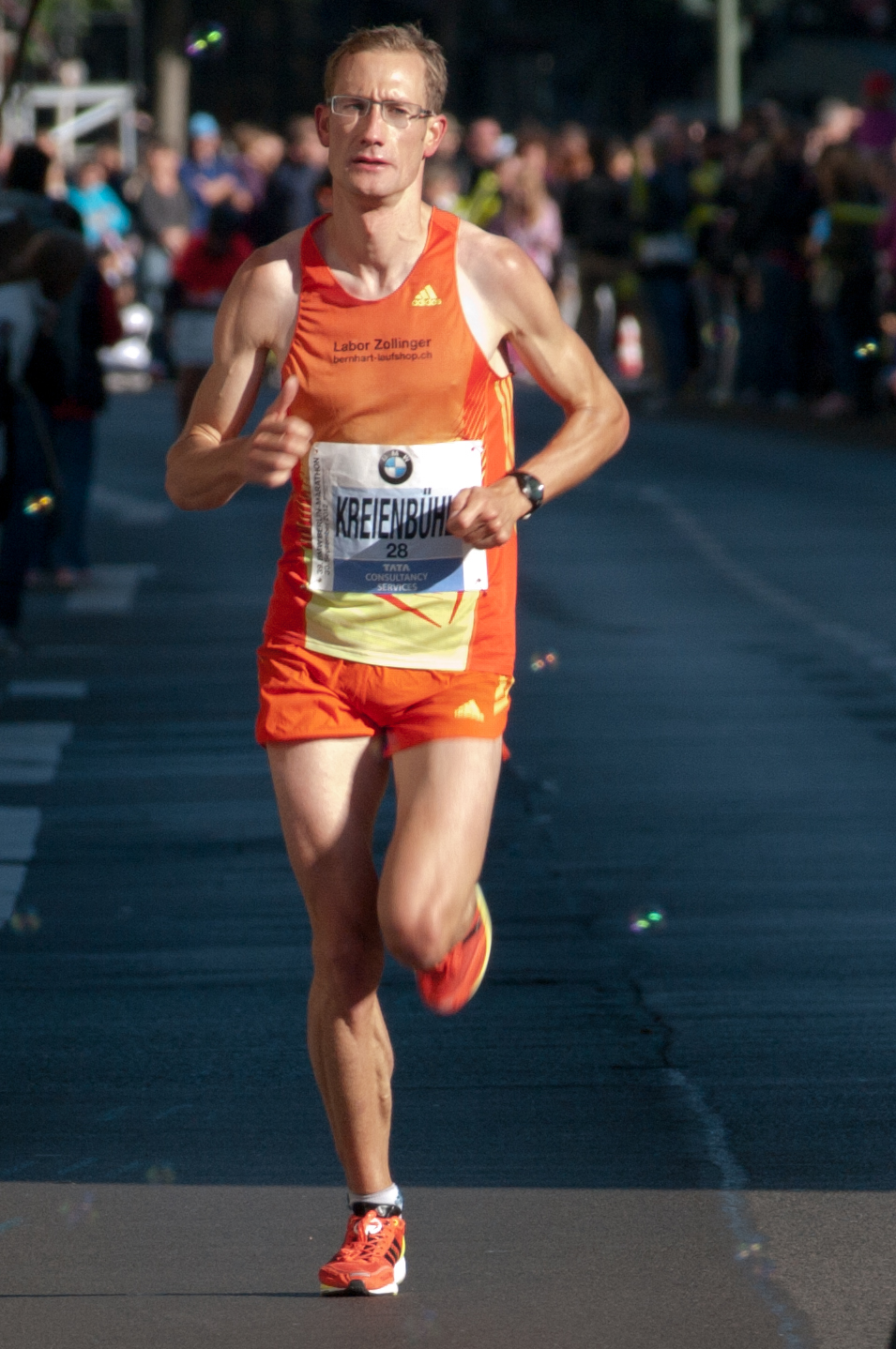
- Christian Kreienbühl in 2012

Personal information
- Born: 6 June 1981 (age 44)

Sport
- Sport: Track and field
- Event: Marathon

Christian Kreienbühl (born 6 June 1981) is a Swiss long-distance runner who specialises in the Marathon. He competed in the men's marathon event at the 2016 Summer Olympics. In 2018, he competed in the men's marathon at the 2018 European Athletics Championships held in Berlin, Germany. He finished in 27th place. He retired from top-level sport in 2020.
