= Serkan Kaya (athlete) =

Turkish long-distance runner

Personal information
- Nationality: Turkish
- Born: July 8, 1984 (age 41) Erzincan, Turkey

Sport
- Country: Turkey
- Sport: Marathon
Medal record
Marathon
Representing Turkey

Serkan Kaya (born July 8, 1984) is a Turkish long-distance runner competing in marathon.

He earned a quota spot for 2016 Summer Olympics with his performance at the 2015 Frankfurt Marathon.
