= Julian Flügel =

German long-distance runner (born 1986)

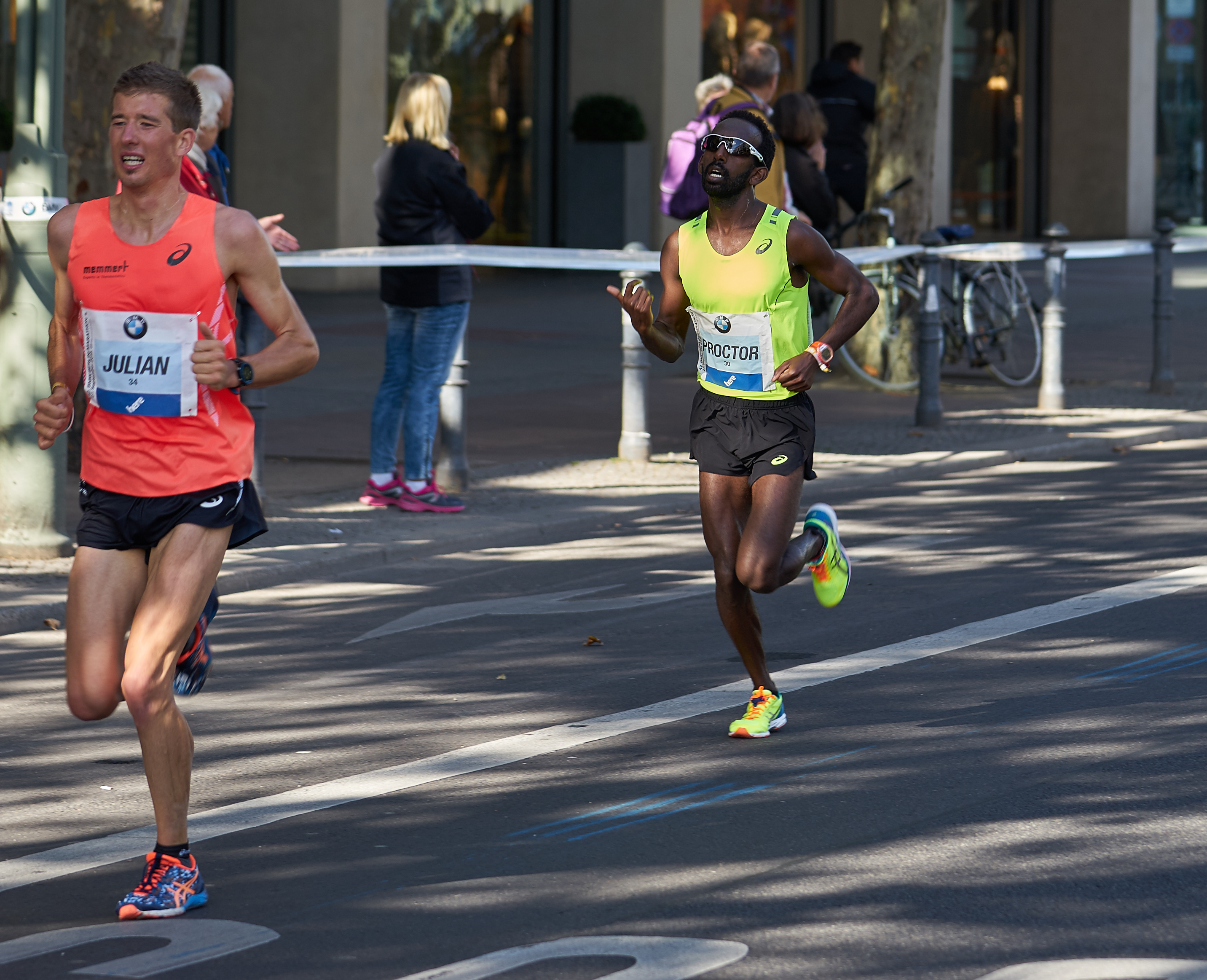
- Julian Flügel in 2015

Personal information
- Nationality: German
- Born: 18 April 1986 (age 40) Fulda, West Germany
- Height: 183 cm (6 ft 0 in)
- Weight: 64 kg (141 lb)

Sport
- Country: Germany
- Sport: Track and field
- Event: Marathon

Julian Flügel (born 18 April 1986) is a German long-distance runner who specialises in the marathon. He competed in the men's marathon event at the 2016 Summer Olympics where he finished in 71st place.
