= Ihor Russ =

Ukrainian long-distance runner

Personal information
- Born: 8 September 1988 (age 37)

Sport
- Sport: Track and field
- Event: Marathon

Ihor Russ (born 8 September 1988) is a Ukrainian long-distance runner who specialises in the marathon. He competed in the men's marathon event at the 2016 Summer Olympics. In 2017, he competed in the marathon event at the World Championships held in London, placing 27th in 2:17:01, his season's best.
