= Fanny Pruvost =

French long-distance runner

Personal information
- Born: 21 May 1979 (age 46)

Sport
- Country: France
- Sport: Long-distance running

Fanny Pruvost (born 21 May 1979) is a French long-distance runner. In 2020, she competed in the women's half marathon at the 2020 World Athletics Half Marathon Championships held in Gdynia, Poland.
