= Olha Skrypak =

Ukrainian long-distance runner

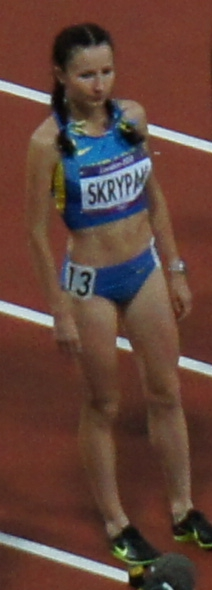
- Olha Skrypak at the 2012 Summer Olympics

Personal information
- Born: 2 December 1990 (age 35)

Sport
- Country: Ukraine
- Sport: Athletics
- Event: Long-distance events

Achievements and titles
- Regional finals: 3rd at the 2012 European Athletics Championships

Olha Skrypak (born 2 December 1990) is a Ukrainian athlete who competes in the long-distance events.

Skrypak won the bronze medal at the 2012 European Athletics Championships in Helsinki at the 10,000 metres event.

In 2020, she competed in the women's half marathon at the 2020 World Athletics Half Marathon Championships held in Gdynia, Poland.
