= Anton Kosmač =

Slovenian long-distance runner

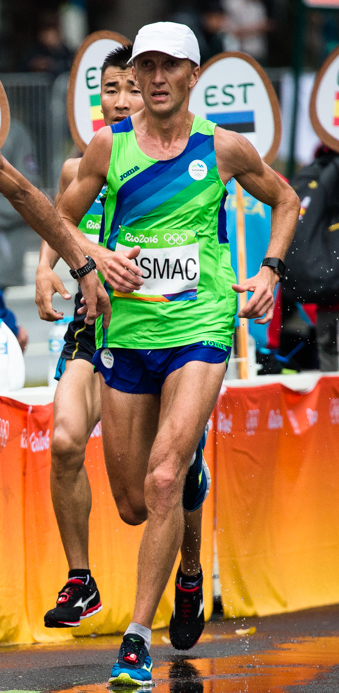
- Kosmač at the 2016 Olympics

Personal information
- Born: 14 December 1976 (age 49)

Sport
- Sport: Track and field
- Event: Marathon

Anton Kosmač (born 14 December 1976) is a Slovenian long-distance runner who specialises in the marathon. He competed in the men's marathon event at the 2016 Summer Olympics.
