= 2016 European Athletics Championships =

23rd European Athletics Championships
- Dates: 6–10 July
- Host city: Amsterdam
- Venue: Olympic Stadium
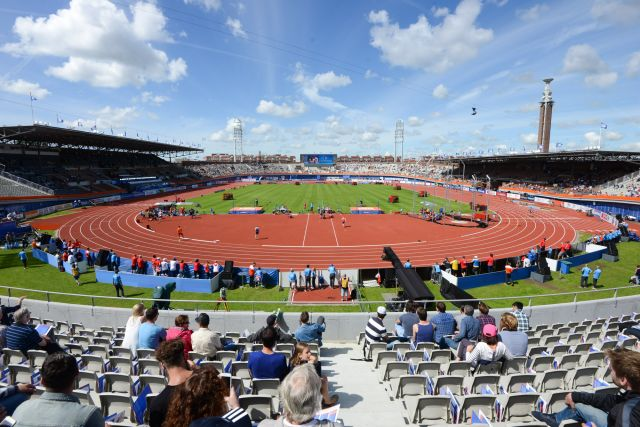
- Level: Senior
- Type: Outdoor
- Events: 44
- Participation: 1,329 athletes from 50 nations

The 2016 European Athletics Championships was held in Amsterdam, Netherlands, between 6 and 10 July 2016. It was the first time the Netherlands hosted the event.

Due to 2016 being an Olympic year, there was no racewalking and the marathon competition was replaced by half marathon. The Russian team did not participate due to the suspension of the All-Russia Athletic Federation by the International Association of Athletics Federations. However, Yuliya Stepanova was individually cleared by the IAAF to compete as an independent athlete; she participated in the European championships under the flag of the European Athletic Association.

Germany and Great Britain topped the medal table with 16, with Poland winning 12 medals. Poland won and topped the victory column with 6 gold medals (Germany & Great Britain tied with 5).

== Event schedule ==
Legend
Key	P	Q	H	½	F
Value	Preliminary round	Qualifiers	Heats	Semifinals	Final

Men
Date	Jul 6		Jul 7			Jul 8			Jul 9			Jul 10	
Event	M	A	M	A		M	A		M	A		M	A
100 m	H			½	F								
200 m			H				½	F					
400 m	H			½			F						
800 m			H				½						F
1500 m				H						F			
5000 m													F
10,000 m							F						
Half marathon												F	
110 m hurdles						H				½	F		
400 m hurdles		H		½			F						
3000 m steeplechase		H					F						
4 × 100 m relay										H			F
4 × 400 m relay									H				F
Long jump	Q			F									
Triple jump			Q							F			
High jump									Q				F
Pole vault		Q					F						
Shot put										Q			F
Discus throw				Q						F			
Hammer throw						Q							F
Javelin throw		Q		F									
Decathlon	F												

Women
Date	Jul 6		Jul 7			Jul 8			Jul 9		Jul 10	
Event	M	A	M	A		M	A		M	A	M	A
100 m				H			½	F				
200 m	H	½		F								
400 m	H			½			F					
800 m		H		½						F		
1500 m							H					F
5000 m										F		
10,000 m		F										
Half marathon											F	
100 m hurdles	H			½	F							
400 m hurdles						H				½		F
3000 m steeplechase						H						F
4 × 100 m relay										H		F
4 × 400 m relay									H			F
Long jump		Q					F					
Triple jump						Q						F
High jump	Q			F								
Pole vault			Q							F		
Shot put		Q		F								
Discus throw	Q						F					
Hammer throw	Q						F					
Javelin throw		Q								F		
Heptathlon						F						

== Results ==
=== Men ===
==== Track ====
Chronology: 2012 | 2014 | 2016 | 2018 | 2020

Event	Gold		Silver		Bronze	
100 metres	Churandy Martina; Netherlands (NED)	10.07 SB	Jak Ali Harvey; Turkey (TUR)	10.07	Jimmy Vicaut; France (FRA)	10.08
200 metres	Bruno Hortelano; Spain (ESP)	20.45	Ramil Guliyev; Turkey (TUR)	20.51	Daniel Talbot; Great Britain & N.I. (GBR)	20.56
400 metres	Martyn Rooney; Great Britain & N.I. (GBR)	45.29	Pavel Maslák; Czech Republic (CZE)	45.36	Liemarvin Bonevacia; Netherlands (NED)	45.41 SB
800 metres	Adam Kszczot; Poland (POL)	1:45.18	Marcin Lewandowski; Poland (POL)	1:45.54	Elliot Giles; Great Britain & N.I. (GBR)	1:45.54 PB
1500 metres	Filip Ingebrigtsen; Norway (NOR)	3:46.65	David Bustos; Spain (ESP)	3:46.90	Henrik Ingebrigtsen; Norway (NOR)	3:47.18
5000 metres	Ilias Fifa; Spain (ESP)	13:40.85	Adel Mechaal; Spain (ESP)	13:40.85	Richard Ringer; Germany (GER)	13:40.85 SB
10,000 metres	Polat Kemboi Arıkan; Turkey (TUR)	28:18.52	Ali Kaya; Turkey (TUR)	28:21.42	Antonio Abadía; Spain (ESP)	28:26.07
Half marathon	Tadesse Abraham; Switzerland (SUI)	1:02:03	Kaan Kigen Özbilen; Turkey (TUR)	1:02:27	Daniele Meucci; Italy (ITA)	1:02:38
Half marathon	Switzerland	3:12:04	Spain	3:12:06	Italy	3:12:41
110 metres hurdles	Dimitri Bascou; France (FRA)	13.25	Balázs Baji; Hungary (HUN)	13.28 NR	Wilhem Belocian; France (FRA)	13.33
400 metres hurdles	Yasmani Copello; Turkey (TUR)	48.98	Sérgio Fernández; Spain (ESP)	49.06	Kariem Hussein; Switzerland (SUI)	49.10
3000 metres steeplechase	Mahiedine Mekhissi-Benabbad; France (FRA)	8:25.63	Aras Kaya; Turkey (TUR)	8:29.91 PB	Yoann Kowal; France (FRA)	8:30.79
4 × 100 metres relay	Great Britain & N.I. James Dasaolu; Adam Gemili; James Ellington; Chijindu Ujah	38.17	France; Marvin René; Stuart Dutamby; Mickael-Meba Zeze; Jimmy Vicaut	38.38 SB	Germany; Julian Reus; Sven Knipphals; Roy Schmidt; Lucas Jakubczyk	38.47
4 × 400 metres relay	Belgium; Julien Watrin; Jonathan Borlée; Dylan Borlée; Kévin Borlée	3:01:10 EL	Poland; Rafał Omelko; Kacper Kozłowski; Łukasz Krawczuk; Jakub Krzewina	3:01:18 SB	Great Britain & N.I. Rabah Yousif; Delano Williams; Jack Green; Matthew Hudson-Smith	3:01:44 SB
WR world record | ER European record | CR championship record | NR national record | WL world leading | EL European leading | PB personal best | SB seasonal best

==== Field ====
Chronology: 2012 | 2014 | 2016 | 2018 | 2020

Event	Gold		Silver		Bronze	
High jump	Gianmarco Tamberi; Italy (ITA)	2.32	Robbie Grabarz; Great Britain & N.I. (GBR)	2.29	Chris Baker; Great Britain & N.I. (GBR); Eike Onnen; Germany (GER)	2.29
Pole vault	Robert Sobera; Poland (POL)	5.60	Jan Kudlička; Czech Republic (CZE)	5.60	Robert Renner; Slovenia (SLO)	5.50
Long jump	Greg Rutherford; Great Britain & N.I. (GBR)	8.25	Michel Tornéus; Sweden (SWE)	8.21 SB	Ignisious Gaisah; Netherlands (NED)	7.93
Triple jump	Max Hess; Germany (GER)	17.20 EL	Karol Hoffmann; Poland (POL)	17.16 PB	Julian Reid; Great Britain & N.I. (GBR)	16.76 SB
Shot put	David Storl; Germany (GER)	21.31 EL	Michał Haratyk; Poland (POL)	21.19	Tsanko Arnaudov; Portugal (POR)	20.59 SB
Discus throw	Piotr Małachowski; Poland (POL)	67.06	Philip Milanov; Belgium (BEL)	65.71	Gerd Kanter; Estonia (EST)	65.27 SB
Javelin throw	Zigismunds Sirmais; Latvia (LAT)	86.66 PB	Vítězslav Veselý; Czech Republic (CZE)	83.59	Antti Ruuskanen; Finland (FIN)	82.44
Hammer throw	Paweł Fajdek; Poland (POL)	80.93	Ivan Tikhon; Belarus (BLR)	78.84	Wojciech Nowicki; Poland (POL)	77.53
Decathlon	Thomas Van der Plaetsen; Belgium (BEL)	8218	Adam Helcelet; Czech Republic (CZE)	8157 SB	Mihail Dudaš; Serbia (SRB)	8153
WR world record | ER European record | CR championship record | NR national record | WL world leading | EL European leading | PB personal best | SB seasonal best

=== Women ===
==== Track ====
Chronology: 2012 | 2014 | 2016 | 2018 | 2020

Event	Gold		Silver		Bronze	
100 metres	Dafne Schippers; Netherlands (NED)	10.90	Ivet Lalova-Collio; Bulgaria (BUL)	11.20	Mujinga Kambundji; Switzerland (SUI)	11.25
200 metres	Dina Asher-Smith; Great Britain & N.I. (GBR)	22.37 SB	Ivet Lalova-Collio; Bulgaria (BUL)	22.52 SB	Gina Lückenkemper; Germany (GER)	22.74
400 metres	Libania Grenot; Italy (ITA)	50.73	Floria Gueï; France (FRA)	51.21	Anyika Onuora; Great Britain & N.I. (GBR)	51.47 SB
800 metres	Nataliya Pryshchepa; Ukraine (UKR)	1:59.70	Rénelle Lamote; France (FRA)	2:00.19	Lovisa Lindh; Sweden (SWE)	2:00.37 PB
1500 metres	Angelika Cichocka; Poland (POL)	4:33.00	Sifan Hassan; Netherlands (NED)	4:33.76	Ciara Mageean; Ireland (IRL)	4:33.78
5000 metres	Yasemin Can; Turkey (TUR)	15:18.15	Meraf Bahta; Sweden (SWE)	15:20.54	Stephanie Twell; Great Britain & N.I. (GBR)	15:20.70
10,000 metres	Yasemin Can; Turkey (TUR)	31:12.86 EL, EU23	Dulce Félix; Portugal (POR)	31:19.03 PB	Karoline Bjerkeli Grøvdal; Norway (NOR)	31:23.45 PB
Half marathon	Sara Moreira; Portugal (POR)	1:10:19	Veronica Inglese; Italy (ITA)	1:10:35	Jéssica Augusto; Portugal (POR)	1:10:55
Half marathon	Portugal	3:33:53	Italy	3:36:38	Turkey	3:39:59
100 metres hurdles	Cindy Roleder; Germany (GER)	12.62 EL	Alina Talay; Belarus (BLR)	12.68	Tiffany Porter; Great Britain & N.I. (GBR)	12.76
400 metres hurdles	Sara Slott Petersen; Denmark (DEN)	55.12 SB	Joanna Linkiewicz; Poland (POL)	55.33	Léa Sprunger; Switzerland (SUI)	55.41
3000 metres steeplechase	Gesa-Felicitas Krause; Germany (GER)	9:18.85 EL	Luiza Gega; Albania (ALB)	9:28.52 NR	Özlem Kaya; Turkey (TUR)	9:35.05 SB
4 × 100 metres relay	Netherlands; Jamile Samuel; Dafne Schippers; Tessa van Schagen; Naomi Sedney	42.04 NR	Great Britain & N.I. Asha Philip; Dina Asher-Smith; Bianca Williams; Daryll Neita	42.45 SB	Germany; Tatjana Pinto; Lisa Mayer; Gina Lückenkemper; Rebekka Haase	42.48
4 × 400 metres relay	Great Britain & N.I. Emily Diamond; Anyika Onuora; Eilidh Doyle; Seren Bundy-Davies	3:25.05 WL	France; Phara Anacharsis; Brigitte Ntiamoah; Marie Gayot; Floria Gueï	3:25.96 SB	Italy; Maria Benedicta Chigbolu; Maria Enrica Spacca; Chiara Bazzoni; Libania Grenot	3:27.49 SB
WR world record | ER European record | CR championship record | NR national record | WL world leading | EL European leading | PB personal best | SB seasonal best

==== Field ====
Chronology: 2012 | 2014 | 2016 | 2018 | 2020

Event	Gold		Silver		Bronze	
High jump	Ruth Beitia; Spain (ESP)	1.98 SB	Mirela Demireva; Bulgaria (BUL); Airinė Palšytė; Lithuania (LTU)	1.96; 1.96 SB	Not awarded	
Pole vault	Ekaterini Stefanidi; Greece (GRE)	4.81 CR	Lisa Ryzih; Germany (GER)	4.70 SB	Angelica Bengtsson; Sweden (SWE)	4.65 SB
Long jump	Ivana Španović; Serbia (SRB)	6.94	Jazmin Sawyers; Great Britain & N.I. (GBR)	6.86	Malaika Mihambo; Germany (GER)	6.65
Triple jump	Patrícia Mamona; Portugal (POR)	14.58 NR	Hanna Minenko; Israel (ISR)	14.51	Paraskevi Papachristou; Greece (GRE)	14.47
Shot put	Christina Schwanitz; Germany (GER)	20.17 EL	Anita Márton; Hungary (HUN)	18.72	Emel Dereli; Turkey (TUR)	18.22
Discus throw	Sandra Perković; Croatia (CRO)	69.97	Julia Fischer; Germany (GER)	65.77	Shanice Craft; Germany (GER)	63.89
Javelin throw	Tatsiana Khaladovich; Belarus (BLR)	66.34 NR	Linda Stahl; Germany (GER)	65.25 SB	Sara Kolak; Croatia (CRO)	63.50 NR
Hammer throw	Anita Włodarczyk; Poland (POL)	78.14	Betty Heidler; Germany (GER)	75.77 SB	Hanna Skydan; Azerbaijan (AZE)	73.83
Heptathlon	Anouk Vetter; Netherlands (NED)	6626 NR	Antoinette Nana Djimou; France (FRA)	6458 SB	Ivona Dadic; Austria (AUT)	6408 NR
WR world record | ER European record | CR championship record | NR national record | WL world leading | EL European leading | PB personal best | SB seasonal best

== Medal table ==
Not including half marathon team medals.

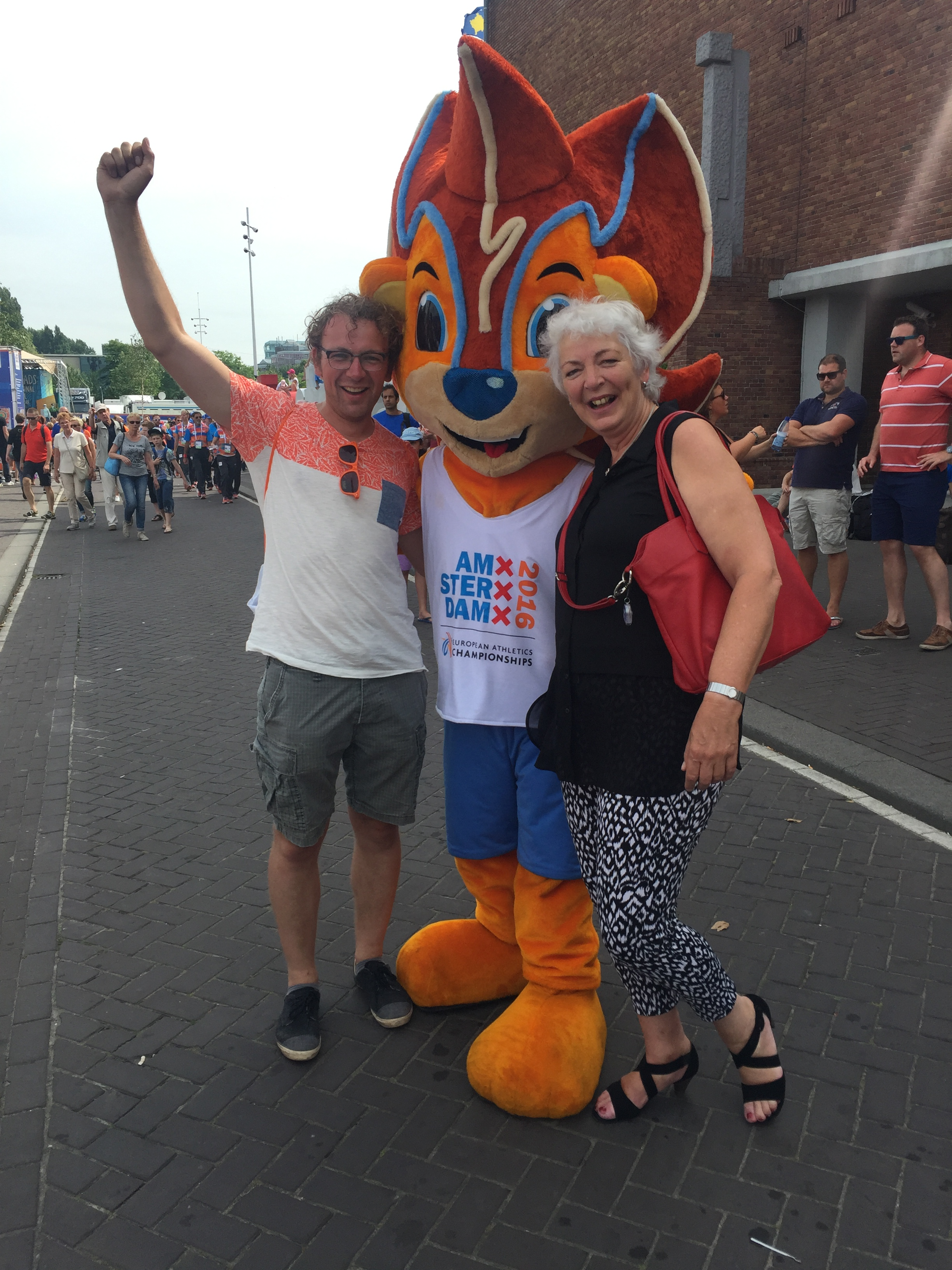
Supporters with the mascot

* Host nation (Host nation)

Rank	Nation	Gold	Silver	Bronze	Total
1	Poland	6	5	1	12
2	Germany	5	4	7	16
3	Great Britain & N.I.	5	3	8	16
4	Turkey	4	5	3	12
5	Netherlands*	4	1	2	7
6	Spain	3	4	1	8
7	Portugal	3	1	2	6
8	France	2	5	3	10
9	Italy	2	2	3	7
10	Belgium	2	1	0	3
11	Switzerland	2	0	3	5
12	Belarus	1	2	0	3
13	Norway	1	0	2	3
14	Croatia	1	0	1	2
14	Greece	1	0	1	2
14	Serbia	1	0	1	2
17	Denmark	1	0	0	1
17	Latvia	1	0	0	1
17	Ukraine	1	0	0	1
20	Czech Republic	0	4	0	4
21	Bulgaria	0	3	0	3
22	Sweden	0	2	2	4
23	Hungary	0	2	0	2
24	Albania	0	1	0	1
24	Israel	0	1	0	1
24	Lithuania	0	1	0	1
27	Austria	0	0	1	1
27	Azerbaijan	0	0	1	1
27	Estonia	0	0	1	1
27	Finland	0	0	1	1
27	Ireland	0	0	1	1
27	Slovenia	0	0	1	1
Totals (32 entries)		46	47	46	139

== Participating nations ==
Athletes from a total of 50 member federations of the European Athletics Association competed at these Championships. Russia, suspended, did not participate. EAA accepted the participation of Russian-born athlete Yuliya Stepanova as an independent neutral athlete.

- Albania (2)
- Andorra (3)
- Armenia (3)
- Austria (15)
- Azerbaijan (5)
- Belarus (39)
- Belgium (30)
- Bosnia and Herzegovina (5)
- Bulgaria (17)
- Croatia (11)
- Cyprus (14)
- Czech Republic (46)
- Denmark (12)
- Estonia (23)
- Finland (36)
- France (60)
- Georgia (2)
- Germany (96)
- Gibraltar (2)
- Great Britain & N.I. (85)
- Greece (35)
- Hungary (29)
- Independent Athletes (EAA) (1)
- Iceland (5)
- Ireland (38)
- Israel (17)
- Italy (73)
- Kosovo (2)
- Latvia (16)
- Liechtenstein (1)
- Lithuania (19)
- Luxembourg (2)
- Macedonia (1)
- Malta (2)
- Moldova (8)
- Monaco (1)
- Montenegro (4)
- Netherlands (52) (host)
- Norway (48)
- Poland (67)
- Portugal (32)
- Romania (22)
- San Marino (1)
- Serbia (9)
- Slovakia (21)
- Slovenia (18)
- Spain (75)
- Sweden (57)
- Switzerland (44)
- Turkey (44)
- Ukraine (81)
