= Switzerland at the 2016 European Athletics Championships =

- WA code: SUI

European Athletics Championships appearances
- 1934; 1938; 1946; 1950; 1954; 1958; 1962; 1966; 1969; 1971; 1974; 1978; 1982; 1986; 1990; 1994; 1998; 2002; 2006; 2010; 2012; 2014; 2016; 2018; 2022; 2024

Switzerland competed at the 2016 European Athletics Championships in Amsterdam, Netherlands, between 6 and 10 July 2016.
