= Tina Muir =

British runner and podcaster

Tina Muir (born 8 August 1988) is a former elite marathoner who is now CEO of Running for Real, and hosts a podcast of the same name. As a professional runner she was a 2:36 marathoner, represented Great Britain and was sponsored by Saucony.

In her first race following retirement at what was considered the peak of her career, Muir won the 2019 Disney World Half Marathon. In that same year, she published Overcoming Amenorrhea: Get Your Period Back. Get Your Life Back. In 2022 she and Zoe Rom will release Becoming a Sustainable Runner.

As of 2020, she is sponsored by Altra Running.
