= Kateryna Karmanenko =

Ukrainian long-distance runner

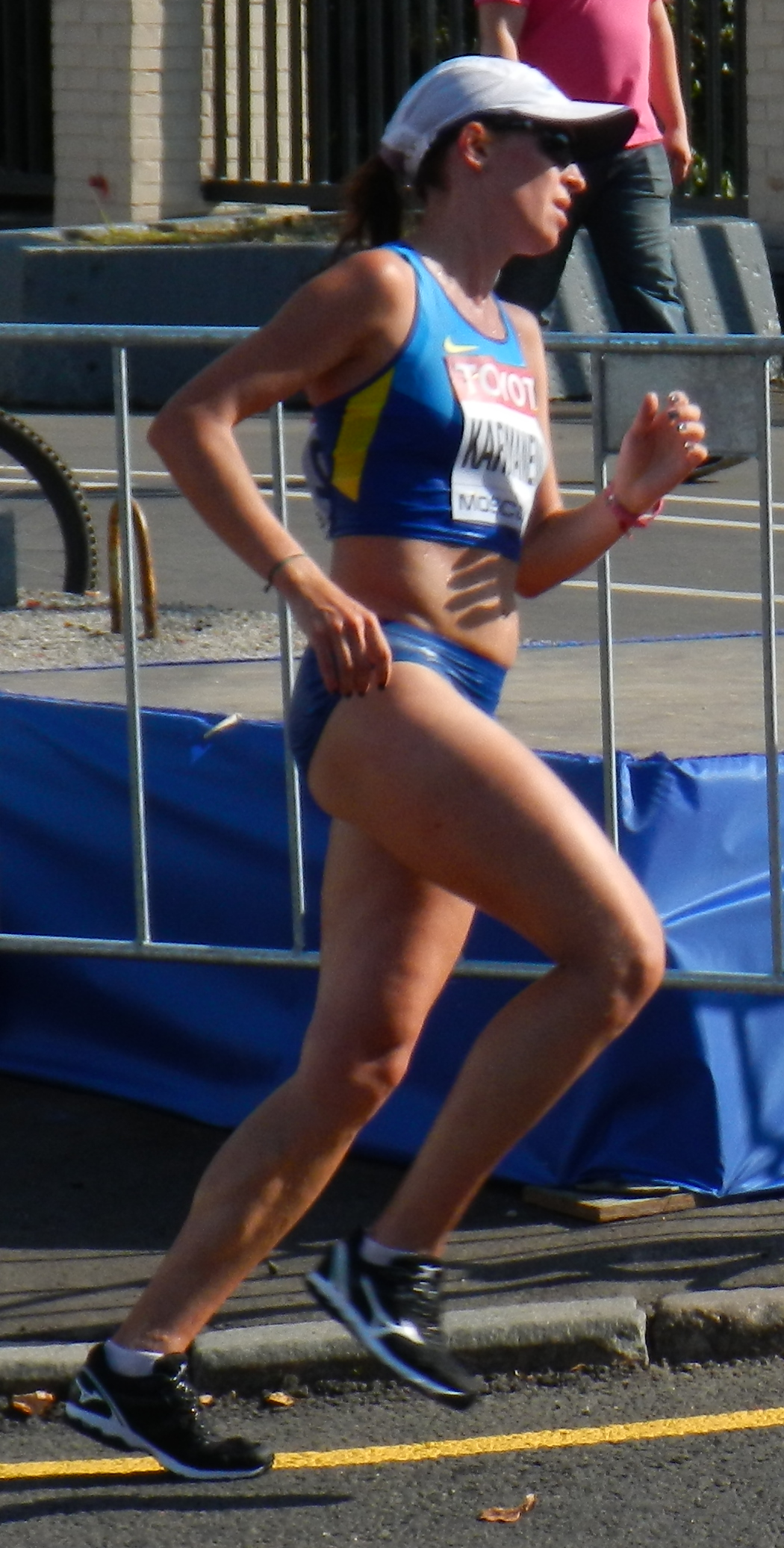
- Kateryna Karmanenko at the IAAF World Championships Moscow 2013 - Women's Marathon

Personal information
- Born: 3 September 1986 (age 39)

Sport
- Country: Ukraine
- Sport: Track and field
- Event: Marathon

Kateryna Karmanenko (born 3 September 1986) is a Ukrainian long-distance runner. She competed in the marathon event at the 2015 World Championships in Athletics in Beijing, China.
