= 2016 European Athletics Championships – Women's 5000 metres =

Women's 5000 metres at the 2016 European Athletics Championships
- Venue: Olympic Stadium
- Location: Amsterdam
- Dates: July 9 (final)
- Competitors: 16 from 11 nations
- Winning time: 15:18.15

Medalists
gold medal	Yasemin Can	Turkey
silver medal	Meraf Bahta	Sweden
bronze medal	Stephanie Twell	Great Britain

The women's 5000 metres at the 2016 European Athletics Championships took place at the Olympic Stadium on 9 July.

== Records ==
Standing records prior to the 2016 European Athletics Championships
World record	Tirunesh Dibaba (ETH)	14:11.15	Oslo, Norway	6 June 2008
European record	Liliya Shobukhova (RUS)	14:23.75	Kazan, Russia	19 July 2008
Championship record	Alemitu Bekele (TUR)	14:52.20	Barcelona, Spain	1 August 2010
World Leading	Almaz Ayana (ETH)	14:12.59	Rome, Italy	2 June 2016
European Leading	Yasemin Can (TUR)	14:37.61	Rome, Italy	2 June 2016

== Schedule ==
Date	Time	Round
9 July 2016	21:05	Final

All times are local times (UTC+2)

== Results ==
=== Final ===
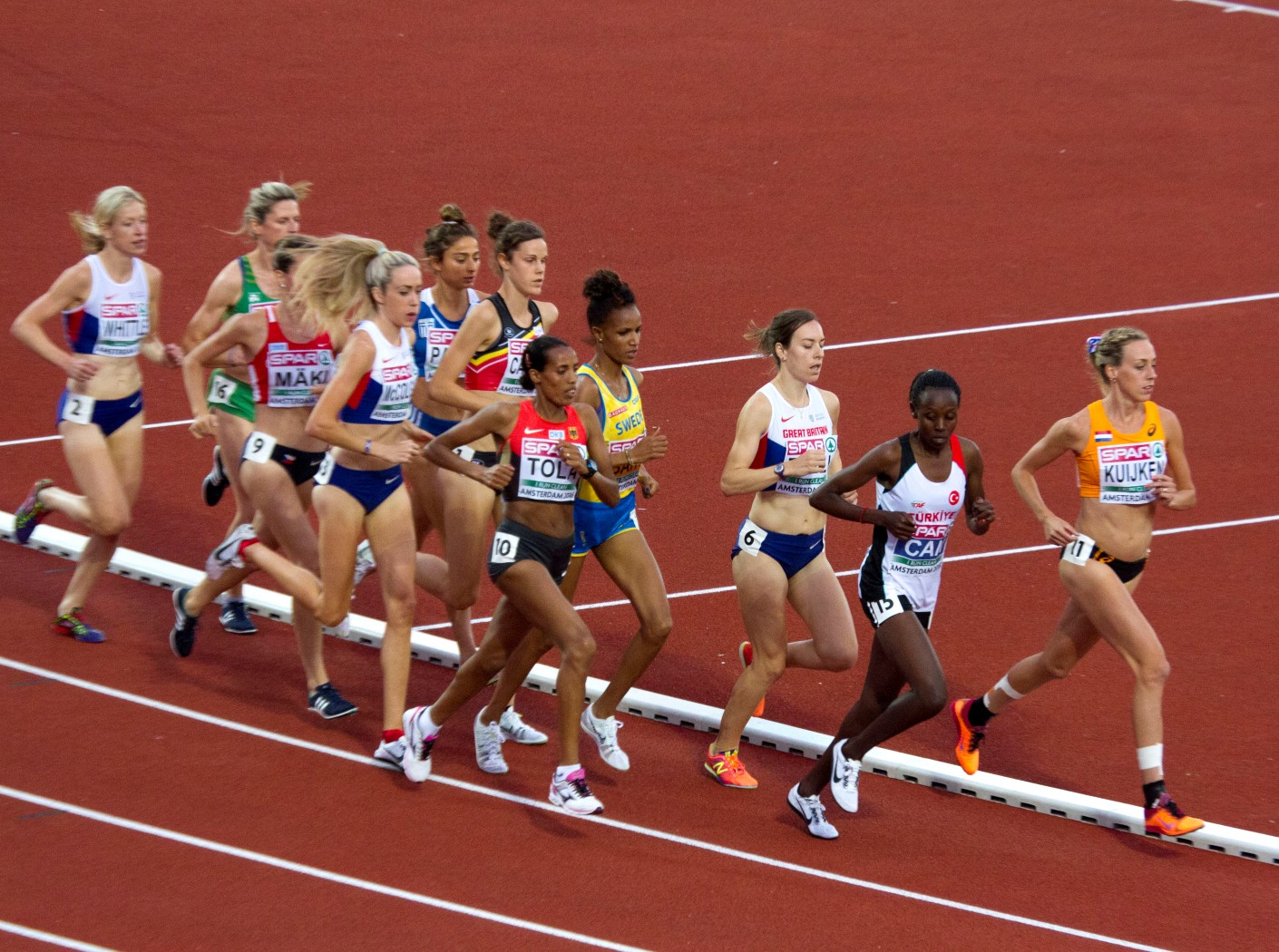
The race underway

Rank	Name	Nationality	Time	Note
1st place, gold medalist(s)	Yasemin Can	Turkey	15:18.15	
2nd place, silver medalist(s)	Meraf Bahta	Sweden	15:20.54	
3rd place, bronze medalist(s)	Steph Twell	Great Britain	15:20.70	
4	Susan Kuijken	Netherlands	15:23.87	SB
5	Laura Whittle	Great Britain	15:24.18	
6	Eilish McColgan	Great Britain	15:28.53	
7	Louise Carton	Belgium	15:42.79	
8	Geleto Tola	Germany	15:43.30	
9	Kristiina Maki	Czech Republic	15:52.90	
10	Deirdre Byrne	Ireland	15:53.67	
11	Alexi Pappas	Greece	15:56.75	
	Maren Kock	Germany	DNF	
	Mary Cullen	Ireland	DNS	
	Trihas Gebre	Spain	DNS	
	Karoline Bjerkeli Grøvdal	Norway	DNS	
	Maureen Koster	Netherlands	DNS	
