= Slovenia at the 2010 European Athletics Championships =

Sporting event delegation

Slovenia was represented by 33 athletes (17 men and 16 women) at the 2010 European Athletics Championships held in Barcelona, Spain.

== Participants ==
Event	Men	Women
100 m	Matic Osovnikar; Gregor Kokalovič	Tina Murn
200 m	Jan Žumer; Gregor Kokalovič; Matic Osovnikar	Sabina Veit; Tina Jureš
400 m	Sebastijan Jagarinec	
Marathon	Primož Kobe; Anton Kosmač; Robert Kotnik	Daneja Grandovec
100 m hurdles		Marina Tomić
High jump	Rožle Prezelj	
Pole vault	Jure Rovan	Tina Šutej
Long jump		Nina Kolarič
Triple jump		Snežana Rodić
Shot put	Miran Vodovnik	
Javelin throw		Martina Ratej
4 × 100 m relay	Matic Osovnikar; Gregor Kokalovič; Jan Žumer; Boštjan Fridrih; Dejan Škoflek	Sabina Veit; Tina Murn; Kristina Žumer; Merlene Ottey; Maja Mihalinec
4 × 400 m relay	Sebastijan Jagarinec; Marko Macuh; Erik Vončina; Jernej Jeras; Uroš Jovanovič	Sabina Veit; Anja Puc; Daša Bajec; Urška Klemen; Liona Rebernik; Maja Mihalinec

== Results ==
2010 Barcelona	Gold	Silver	Bronze	Total
Slovenia (SLO)	0	0	0	0
