= Slovenia at the 2012 European Athletics Championships =

Slovenia competed at the 2012 European Athletics Championships held in Helsinki, Finland, between 27 June to 1 July 2012.

== Results ==
=== Men ===
==== Track ====
Event	Athletes	Heats		Semifinal		Final	
Event	Athletes	Result	Rank	Result	Rank	Result	Rank
100 m	Matic Osovnikar	10.60	26	did not advance			
200 m	Jan Žumer	21.50	21	did not advance			
400 m	Brent LaRue	DQ		did not advance			
800 m	Žan Rudolf	1:46.98	3 Q	1:47.41	12	did not advance	
400 m hurdles	Brent LaRue	DQ		did not advance			

==== Field ====
Event	Athletes	Qualification		Final	
Event	Athletes	Result	Rank	Result	Rank
High jump	Rožle Prezelj	2.15	21	did not advance	
Javelin throw	Matija Kranjc	72.49	22	did not advance	

=== Women ===
==== Track ====
Event	Athletes	Heats		Semifinal		Final	
Event	Athletes	Result	Rank	Result	Rank	Result	Rank
200 m	Kristina Žumer	23.95	23 q	—		did not advance	
1500 m	Sonja Roman	4:16.68	20	—		did not advance	
100 m hurdles	Marina Tomić	13.36	20	did not advance			
4 × 100 m relay	Alja Sitar; Sara Strajnar; Kristina Žumer; Merlene Ottey	44.28	11	—		did not advance	

==== Field ====
Event	Athletes	Qualification		Final	
Event	Athletes	Result	Rank	Result	Rank
Triple jump	Snežana Rodić	13.95	15	did not advance	
Triple jump	Marija Šestak	14.17	9 q	14.01	10
Pole vault	Tina Šutej	4.15	24	did not advance	
Javelin throw	Martina Ratej	51.69	21	did not advance	
Hammer throw	Barbara Špiler	65.37	16	did not advance	
