= 1991 German Athletics Championships =

- Edition: 91st
- Start date: 26 July
- End date: 28 July
- Host city: Hannover, Germany
- Venue: Niedersachsenstadion
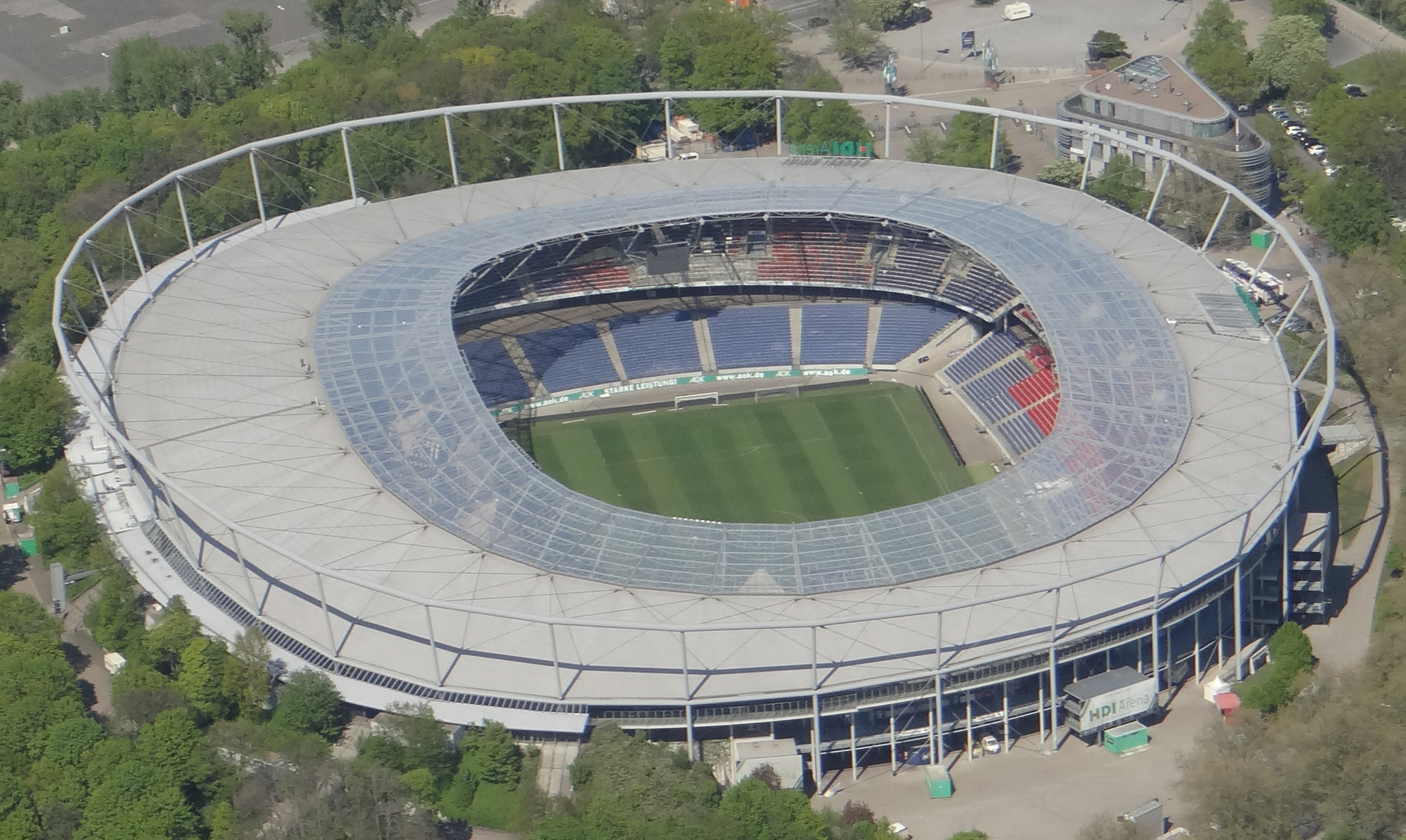
- Events: 37 (+37)

The 1991 German Athletics Championships was the 91st edition of the national championship in outdoor track and field for Germany. It was held on 26–28 July at the Niedersachsenstadion in Hannover. It served as the selection meeting for Germany at the 1991 World Championships in Athletics. It marked the resumption of an all-Germany national competition for athletes from East Germany and West Germany, following the fall of the Berlin Wall. The merged competition programme followed that of the 1990 West German Athletics Championships, with the only amendment being the inclusion of a women's team aspect to the mountain running championship.

== Championships ==
As usual, due to time or organizational reasons, various competitions were not held as part of the main event in Hannover. The annual national championships in Germany held separately from the main track and field competition comprised the following:

Event	Venue	Date(s)	Notes
Cross country running	Bad Harzburg	2 March	
Road running Men's 25K run Women's 15K run	Offenbach an der Queich	21 April	
Marathon	Oelde	27 April	
10,000 metres	Potsdam	5 June	
Relays; Women's 3 × 800 m Men's 4 × 800 m Men's 4 × 1500 m	Munich	26 May	incorporated into the German Combined Events Championships
Combined track and field events Women's heptathlon Men's decathlon	Munich	25–26 May	
100K run	Scheeßel	12 October	
Mountain running	Oberstdorf	22 September	Held in conjunction with the Nebelhorn-Berglaufs
Racewalking; Men's 50 km walk Women's 10 km walk	Naumburg	21 April	

== Results ==
=== Men ===
Event	Gold		Silver		Bronze	
100 metres	Steffen Bringmann; MTG Mannheim	10.42 s	Steffen Görmer; SV Halle	10.52 s	Volker Westhagemann; LG Olympia Dortmund	10.56 s
200 metres	Michael Huke; TV Wattenscheid	20.69 s	Marcus Skupin-Alfa; VfL Sindelfingen	20.91 s	Peter Klein; SV Salamander Kornwestheim	21.01 s
400 metres	Jens Carlowitz; SC Chemnitz	45.49 s	Norbert Dobeleit; TV Wattenscheid	45.97 s	Rico Lieder; Chemnitzer SC	46.38 s
800 metres	Joachim Dehmel; SpVgg. Feuerbach	1:47.85 min	Mark Eplinius; SCC Berlin	1:48.29 min	Mike Kemsies; SCC Berlin	1:48.58 min
1500 metres	Jens-Peter Herold; SCC Berlin	3:42.72 min	Jörg Haas; LG Offenburg	3:43.66 min	Andreas Rettig; LC Rehlingen	3:44.34 min
5000 metres	Dieter Baumann; LG Bayer Leverkusen	13:40.06 min	Jens Karraß; SCC Berlin	13:56.45 min	Klaus Peter Nabein; LAC Quelle Fürth	13:56.80 min
10,000 metres	Jens Karraß; SCC Berlin	28:15.28 min	Stéphane Franke; SV Salamander Kornwestheim	28:26.86 min	Carsten Eich; SC DHfK Leipzig	28:32.62 min
25K run	Rainer Wachenbrunner; Berliner SC	1:17:31 h	Werner Schildhauer; LG Olympia Dortmund	1:17:31 h	Kurt Stenzel; ASC Darmstadt	1:18:00 h
25K team	LC Euskirchen; Heinz-Bernd Bürger; Frank Kase; Sven Wille	4:01:03 h	LAC Quelle Fürth / München; Eike Loch; Udo Reeh; Alexander Schatz	4:03:43 h	LG Olympia Dortmund; Werner Schildhauer; Jens Wilky; Jörg Valentin	4:04:28 h
Marathon	Thomas Ertl; TSV Burghaslach)	2:20:30 h	Hans Pfisterer; LG Frankfurt	2:20:35 h	Stefan Paul; VfL Sindelfingen	2:21:04 h
Marathon team	LG Frankfurt; Hans Pfisterer; Wolfgang Münzel; Volker Isigkeit	7:14:24 h	LG Braunschweig; Michael Sens; Volker Krajenski; Dieter Göhl	7:24:10 h	TSV Burghaslach; Thomas Ertl; Rainer Mühlberg; Alfredo Blasel	7:29:49 h
100 kilometres	Heinz Hüglin; LV Ettenheim	6:43:51 h	Volker Becker-Wirbel; LTF Marpingen	6:46:01 h	Dietmar Knies; USC Leipzig	6:49:18 h
100 kilometres team	LTF Marpingen; Volker Becker-Wirbel; Robert Feller; Hans Grandke	21:24:32 h	DJK Elmar Kohlscheid; Dietmar Veith; Rainer Kleinfeld; Heinz Gülpen	22:09:57 h	Triathlon Hub/Nürnberg; Hartmut Häber; Karl-Heinz Neudeck; Achim Heukemes	22:54:33 h
110 m hurdles	Florian Schwarthoff; TV Heppenheim	13.43 s	Dietmar Koszewski; LAC Halensee Berlin	13.61 s	Sven Göhler; OSC Potsdam	13.93 s
400 m hurdles	Olaf Hense; LG Olympia Dortmund	49.73 s	Udo Schiller; LG Olympia Dortmund	50.08 s	Carsten Köhrbrück; LAC Halensee Berlin	50.14 s
3000 m s'chase	Hagen Melzer; Dresdner SC	8:34.51 min	Torsten Herwig; SCC Berlin	8:34.93 min	Hubert Karl; LAC Quelle Fürth	8:35.29 min
4 × 100 m relay	TV Wattenscheid; Dietmar Schulte; Dirk Schweisfurth; Michael Huke; Werner Zaske	39.64 s	VfL Sindelfingen; Joey Walz; Holger Vogelsang; Michael Schwab; Marcus Skupin-Alfa	39.97 s	LG Bayer Leverkusen; Schu; Michael Grün; Johannes Wischerhoff; Wolfgang Haupt	40.02 s
4 × 400 m relay	ASV Köln; Ulrich Schlepütz; Klaus-Christian Weigeldt; Alexander Adam; Marc-Antonius Eggers	3:06.26 min	LG VfB/Kickers Stuttgart; Jürgen Mehl; Ralph Pfersich; Rolf Setzer; Volker Höschele	3:06.57 min	VfL Sindelfingen; Peter Mayer; Michael Schwab; Bernd Koschka; Jörg Vaihinger	3:08.41 min
4 × 800 m relay	SCC Berlin; Mike Kemsies John-Henry May; Rainer Sudau; Mark Eplinius	7:20.25 min	LG Bayer Leverkusen; Harald Andrä; Mirko Teichert; Oliver Klaudt; Jussi Udelhoven	7:21.33 min	SpVgg. Feuerbach; Arthur Klein; Frank Maier; Alexander Dehmel; Joachim Dehmel	7:21.35 min
4 × 1500 m relay	LG Bayer Leverkusen; Ernst Ludwig; Imram Sillah; Burkhard Wagner; Dieter Baumann	15:17.76 min	TV Wattenscheid; Stephan Plätzer; Michael Fietz; Ingo Janich; Rüdiger Stenzel	15:18.25 min	SCC Berlin; Gordon Schatz; Uwe König; Andreas Wagner; Olaf Beyer	15:25.03 min
20 km walk	Robert Ihly; LFV Schutterwald	1:22:38 h	Ronald Weigel; OSC Potsdam	1:23:00 h	Axel Noack; Berliner SC	1:23:49 h
20 km walk team	OSC Potsdam; Ronald Weigel; Olaf Möldner; Alexander Preusche	4:19:24 h	TSV Erfurt; Hartwig Gauder; Ralf Weise; Torsten Trampeli	4:21:30 h	LAC Quelle Fürth / München; Ralf Rose; Peter Zanner; Wolfgang Wiedemann	4:32:05 h
50 km walk	Ronald Weigel; OSC Potsdam	3:45:57 h	Hartwig Gauder; TSV Erfurt	3:49:10 h	Torsten Trampeli; TSV Erfurt	4:01:12 h
50 km walk team	LAC Quelle Fürth; Robert Mildenberger; Alfons Schwarz; Manfred Kreutz	13:16:06 h	Berliner SV 1892; Volkmar Scholz; Oliver Oefelein; Reiner Offel	13:56:35 h	LG Boppard / Bad Salzig; Michael Tryankowski; Andreas Klose; Rainer Tryankowski	14:26:17 h
High jump	Carlo Thränhardt; ASV Köln	2.25 m	Dietmar Mögenburg; TV Wattenscheid	2.23 m	Karol Getek; LAC Quelle Fürth	2.23 m
Pole vault	Bernhard Zintl; TSV 1860 München	5.50 m	Uwe Langhammer; TuS Jena	5.40 m	Werner Holl; LG Herlazhofen	5.40 m
Long jump	Dietmar Haaf; SV Salamander Kornwestheim	7.97 m	André Müller; SC Empor Rostock	7.80 m	Jens Hirschberg; SC Magdeburg	7.79 m
Triple jump	Ralf Jaros; TV Wattenscheid	16.75 m	Volker Mai; SC Neubrandenburg	16.50 m	André Ernst; SV Halle	16.42 m
Shot put	Oliver-Sven Buder; Chemnitzer SC	20.20 m	Ulf Timmermann; Berliner SC	19.87 m	Kalman Konya; SV Salamander Kornwestheim	19.62 m
Discus throw	Wolfgang Schmidt; LG VfB/Kickers Stuttgart	64.98 m	Jürgen Schult; Schweriner SC	64.26 m	Lars Riedel; USC Mainz	64.16 m
Hammer throw	Heinz Weis; LG Bayer Leverkusen	79.20 m	Claus Dethloff; LG Frankfurt	74.98 m	Karsten Kobs; LG Olympia Dortmund	71.04 m
Javelin throw	Klaus Tafelmeier; LG Bayer Leverkusen	82.72 m	Volker Hadwich; SC Magdeburg	81.20 m	Raymond Hecht; SC Magdeburg	80.32 m
Decathlon	Christian Schenk; USC Mainz	8301 pts	Thorsten Dauth; TG Groß-Karbern	8108 pts	Stefan Schmid; LG Karlstadt	7819 pts
Decathlon team	USC Mainz; Christian Schenk; Peter Neumaier; Christian Deick	23.474 pts	LAC Quelle Fürth / München; Norbert Demmel; Bruno Chirco; Stock	22.854 pts	LG Bayer Leverkusen; Günther; Paul Meier; Kurowski	21.956 pts
Cross country short course – 4000 m	Klaus-Peter Nabein; LAC Quelle Fürth	12:22 min	Olaf Beyer; SCC Berlin	12:26 min	Michael Witt; LG Nordheide	12:28 min
Cross country short course, Team	LAC Quelle Fürth; Klaus-Peter Nabein; Hubert Karl; Dieter Deininger	16	LG Nordheide; Michael Witt; Peter Hempel; Rolf Helmboldt	67	Eintracht Frankfurt; Ulrich Keil; Enrique Tortell; Ch. Simon	73
Cross country long course – 12.0 km	Heinz-Bernd Bürger; LC Euskirchen	38:31 min	Konrad Dobler; SVO Germaringen	38:42 min	Rüdiger Grunwald; LG VfB/Kickers Stuttgart	39:14 min
Cross country long course, Team	Racing-Club Berlin; Steffen Dittmann; Koch; Stefan Seidemann	39	SCC Berlin; Peter Könnicke; Jens Karraß; Matthess	61	SVO Germaringen; Konrad Dobler; Martin Sambale; Xaver Stückl	79
Mountain running	Dieter Ranftl; LC Buchendorf	39:34 min	Heiko Schinkitz; SG Adelsberg	39:50 min	Kurt König; TSV Oberstaufen	39:59 min
Mountain running team	LG Frankfurt; Wolfgang Münzel; Jörg Leipner; Jan-Henning Schoch	2:04:58 h	SVO Germaringen; Martin Sambale; Xaver Stückl; Jörg Kunstmann	2:06:37 h	LAC Quelle Fürth / München; Jochen Laub; Theo Kiefner; Gunnar Rethfeldt	2:08:17 h

=== Women ===
Event	Gold		Silver		Bronze	
100 metres	Katrin Krabbe; SC Neubrandenburg	10.91 s	Grit Breuer; SC Neubrandenburg	11.14 s	Sabine Richter; Eintracht Frankfurt	11.45 s
200 metres	Katrin Krabbe; SC Neubrandenburg	22.12 s	Grit Breuer; SC Neubrandenburg	22.55 s	Silke-Beate Knoll; LG Olympia Dortmund	23.27 s
400 metres	Karin Janke; VfL Wolfsburg	51.75 s	Katrin Schreiter; TSV Erfurt	52.26 s	Annett Hesselbarth; SV Halle	52.42 s
800 metres	Christine Wachtel; SC Empor Rostock	1:59.04 min	Sigrun Grau; SC Neubrandenburg	1:59.29 min	Birte Bruhns; ASV Köln	1:59.55 min
1500 metres	Ellen Kießling; Dresdner SC	4:16.75 min	Steffi Kallensee; Eintracht Frankfurt	4:17.50 min	Yvonne Mai; SC Empor Rostock	4:17.67 min
3000 metres	Anke Schäning; ASV Köln	8:58.62 min	Katje Hoffmann; SCC Berlin	8:59.78 min	Claudia Borgschulze; LG Olympia Dortmund	9:01.98 min
10,000 metres	Kathrin Ullrich; SCC Berlin	31:46.00 min	Birgit Jerschabek; LG Sieg	32:50.85 min	Christina Mai; LG Olympia Dortmund	32:55.18 min
15K run	Birgit Jerschabek; LG Sieg	50:48 min	Monika Schäfer; LAC Quelle Fürth / München	51:12 min	Claudia Borgschulze; LG Olympia Dortmund	51:51 min
15K team	LG Olympia Dortmund; Claudia Borgschulze; Christina Mai; Birgit Reefschläger	2:40:10 h	ASV Köln; Anke Schäning; Sabine Mann; Tanja Kalinowski	2:45:07 h	LAC Quelle Fürth / München; Monika Schäfer; Klothilde Staab; Gabriele Almannstötter	2:45:19 h
Marathon	Sigrid Wulsch; LG Menden	2:48:28 h	Petra Sander; LAV Bayer Uerdingen / Dormagen	2:51:49 h	Anita Höcherl; LG Regensburg	2:53:17 h
Marathon team	Eichenkreuz Schwaikheim; Gudrun Rüth; Hannelore Nothdurft; Claudia Müller	9:25:59 h	LAV Bayer Uerdingen / Dormagen; Petra Sander; Sigrid Altmeyer; Gislinde Redepenning	9:31:43 h	TuS Solbad Ravensberg; Maria Pautmeier; Hildegard Bartelsmeier; Monika Renne	9:59:43 h
100 kilometres	Birgit Lennartz; ASV Sankt Augustin	7:35:21 h	Sybille Möllensiep; SuS Schalke 96	8:01:20 h	Sigrid Lomsky; SCC Berlin	8:18:27 h
100 kilometres team	SCC Berlin; Sigrid Lomsky; Christel Heine; Stefanie Cain	26:26:04 h	SSC Hanau-Rodenbach; Anna Dyck; Franziska Lüttgen; Maria Marco	29:28:36 h	Only two teams entered	
100 m hurdles	Kristin Patzwahl; SC DHfK Leipzig	13.12 s	Cornelia Oschkenat; Berliner SC	13.21 s	Gloria Siebert; SC Cottbus	13.21 s
400 m hurdles	Heike Meißner; Dresdner SC	55.16 s	Silvia Rieger; TuS Eintracht Hinte	55.47 s	Gudrun Abt; TSV Genkingen	55.66 s
4 × 100 m relay	LG Bayer Leverkusen; Anja Böhme; Silke Lichtenhagen; Stefanie Hütz; Bettina Braag	44.33 s	VfL Sindelfingen; Margrit Schiller; Ulrike Sarvari; Andrea Thomas; Doreen Fahrendorff	44.52 s	Eintracht Frankfurt; Sandra Löffler; Simone Haja; Sabine Richter; Britta Schulmeyer	44.96 s
4 × 400 m relay	LG Olympia Dortmund; Jessica Kawohl; Ruth Scheppan; Helga Arendt; Silke-Beate Knoll	3:33.92 min	SCC Berlin; Manuela Peters; Ines Conradi; Nicole Leistenschneider; Sandra Seuser	3:34.65 min	MTV Ingolstadt; Petra Rappe; Birgit Clarius; Daniela Ott; Monika Weilhammer	3:39.89 min
3 × 800 m relay	SCC Berlin; Katje Hoffmann; Carmen Wüstenhagen; Nicole Leistenschneider	6:23.06 min	TV Gelnhausen; Amona Schneeweis; Ute Lix; Karin Lix	6:29.73 min	LAC Quelle Fürth / München; Astrid Jahn; Ute Haak; Hildegard Körner	6:31.05 min
5000 m walk	Beate Anders; LAC Halensee Berlin	21:03.14 min	Kathrin Born; Berliner SC	21:20.63 min	Andrea Brückmann; LAZ Lahn-Aar-Diez	22:11.86 min
10 km walk	Beate Anders; LAC Halensee Berlin	44:18 min	Kathrin Born; Berliner SC	45:10 min	Simone Thust; LAC Halensee Berlin	46:36 min
10 km walk team	LAC Halensee Berlin; Beate Anders; Simone Thust; Sandra Priemer	2:25:29 h	SC DHfK Leipzig; Uta Klaedtke; Annett Amberg; Esther Lange	2:30:20 h	FV Ostercappeln; Brandenburg; Luttmann; Krahn	2:34:26 h
High jump	Heike Henkel; LG Bayer Leverkusen	2.00 m	Heike Balck; Schweriner SC	1.94 m	Birgit Kähler; LAV Bayer Uerdingen / Dormagen	1.90 m
Long jump	Heike Drechsler; TuS Jena	7.07 m	Susen Tiedtke; SCC Berlin	6.70 m	Anke Behmer; SC Neubrandenburg	6.58 m
Shot put	Claudia Losch; LAC Quelle Fürth	19.65 m	Stephanie Storp; VfL Wolfsburg	18.98 m	Vera Schmidt; MTV Ingolstadt	18.72 m
Discus throw	Ilke Wyludda; SV Halle	68.78 m	Martina Hellmann; SC DHfK Leipzig	65.30 m	Franka Dietzsch; SC Neubrandenburg	60.62 m
Javelin throw	Karen Forkel; SV Halle	66.70 m	Silke Renk; SV Halle	65.22 m	Petra Meier; TuS Jena	63.96 m
Heptathlon	Peggy Beer; Berliner SC	6318 pts	Anke Behmer; SC Neubrandenburg	6300 pts	Ines Krause; Chemnitzer SC	6035 pts
Heptathlon team	LG Bayer Leverkusen; Anke Straschewski; Bettina Braag; Dagmar Federwisch	16.650 pts	OSC Berlin; Marion Zillwich; Micheline Borchert; Sylvana Finke	16.144 pts	LG Nordwest Hamburg; Ute Niendorf; Claudia Liedtke; Birgit Maschler	15.986 pts
Cross country short course – 2000 m	Steffi Kallensee; Eintracht Frankfurt	6:43 min	Claudia Metzner; BV Teutonia Lanstrop	6:49 min	Petra Wassiluk; ASC Darmstadt	6:59 min
Cross country short course, Team	LG Wedel Pinneberg; Meike Wirdemann; Astrid Bartels; Nicole Theophil	29	SCC Berlin; Nicole Leistenschneider; Barth; Gipp	36	Eintracht Frankfurt; Steffi Kallensee; Gabriele Huber; Martina Franke	47
Cross country long course – 6000 m	Christina Mai; LG Olympia Dortmund	21:16 min	Kerstin Preßler; Neuköllner Sportfreunde	21:29 min	Claudia Borgschulze; LG Olympia Dortmund	21:33 min
Cross country long course, Team	LG Olympia Dortmund; Christina Mai; Claudia Borgschulze; Jutta Karsch	14	ASV Köln; Tanja Kalinowski; Annabel Holtkamp; Ute Jenke	25	LBV Phönix Lübeck; Kerstin Herzberg; Stefanie Hormann; Beate Burmester	51
Mountain running	Barbara Guerike; Freiburger FC	47:52 min	Silke Welt; LC Offenbach	48:19 min	Sabine Forner; TV 1846 Isny	50:14 min
Mountain running team	TV 1846 Isny; Sabine Forner; Sylvia Prior; Bolsinger	2:37:56 h	LAV Bayer Uerdingen / Dormagen; Petra Sander; Sigrid Altmeyer; Redepenning	2:43:21 h	TSV Bad Nenndorf; Elisabeth Nenninger; Bauer; Weichselbaumer	2:51:19 h
