= 1992 German Athletics Championships =

- Edition: 92nd
- Start date: 19 June
- End date: 21 June
- Host city: Munich, Germany
- Venue: Olympiastadion
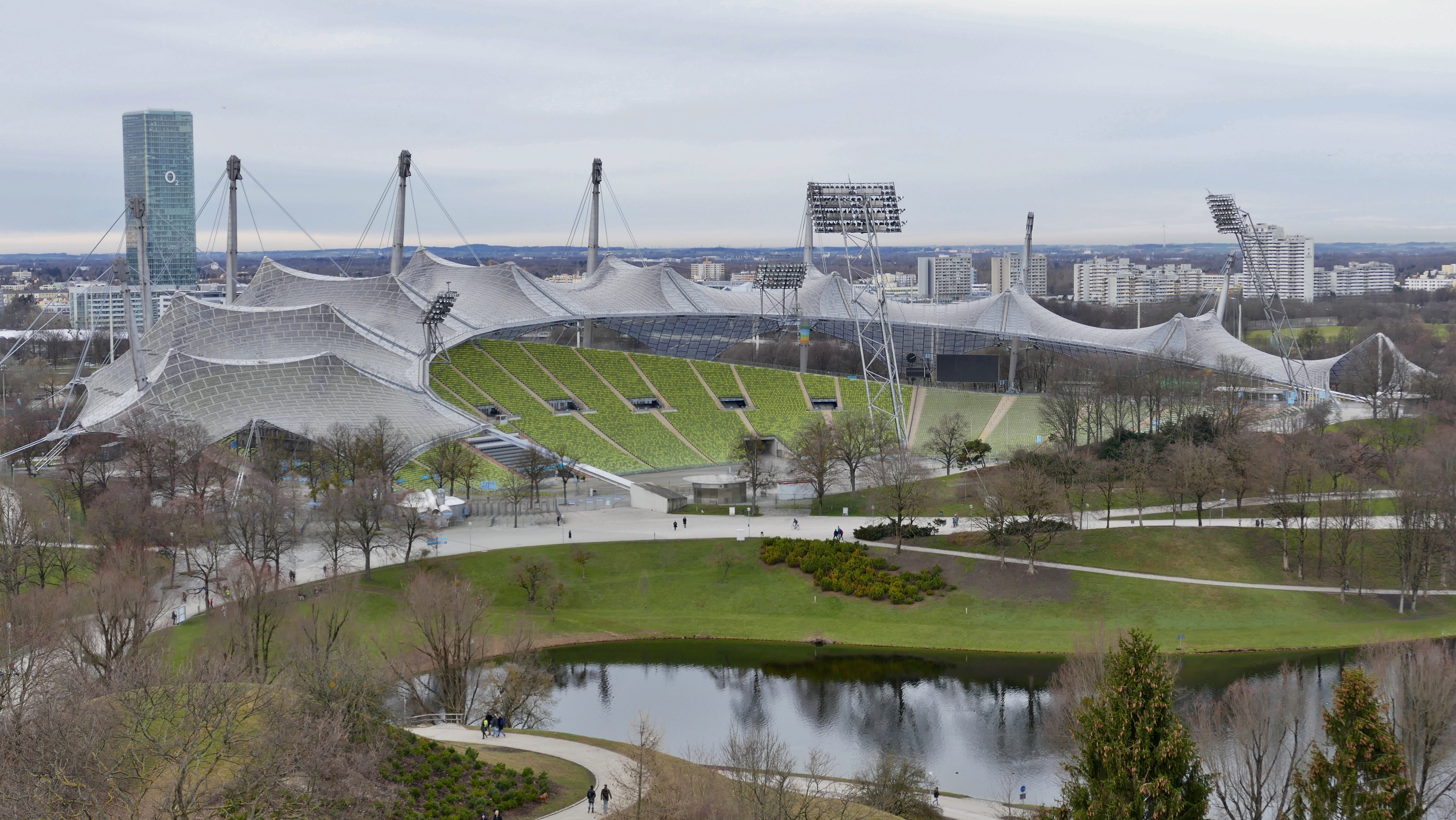
- Events: 39 (+37)

The 1992 German Athletics Championships was the 92nd edition of the national championship in outdoor track and field for Germany. It was held on 19–21 June at the Olympiastadion in Munich. It served as the selection meeting for Germany at the 1992 Summer Olympics. For the first time, women's pole vault and triple jump were contested.

The failed doping tests of Katrin Krabbe and Grit Breuer, two of Germany's best athletes, brought attention to the drug testing programme at the national championships.

== Championships ==
As usual, due to time or organizational reasons, various competitions were not held as part of the main event in Munich. The annual national championships in Germany held separately from the main track and field competition comprised the following:

Event	Venue	Date(s)	Notes
Cross country running	Iffezheim	7 March	
Road running Men's 25K run Women's 15K run	Koblenz	25 April	
Marathon	Herxheim bei Landau/Pfalz	19 September	
10,000 metres	Jena	28 May	
Relays; Women's 3 × 800 m Men's 4 × 800 m Men's 4 × 1500 m	Ahlen	30 August	incorporated into the German Combined Events Championships
Combined track and field events Women's heptathlon Men's decathlon	Ahlen	29–30 August	
100K run	Rheine	5 September	
Mountain running	Freiburg im Breisgau	20 June	Held in conjunction with the Schauinsland-Berglaufs
Racewalking; Men's 50 km walk Women's 10 km walk	Berlin	10 April	

== Results ==
=== Men ===
Event	Gold		Silver		Bronze	
100 metres	Steffen Bringmann; MTG Mannheim	10.58 s	Michael Huke; TV Wattenscheid	10.63 s	Wolfgang Haupt; LG Bayer Leverkusen	10.72 s
200 metres	Robert Kurnicki; TV Wattenscheid	20.68 s	Alexander Lack; SC Neubrandenburg	20.72 s	Jan Lillie; SV Union Groß-Ilsede	20.82 s
400 metres	Thomas Schönlebe; LG Chemnitz	45.20 s	Ralph Pfersich; LG VfB/Kickers Stuttgart	46.13 s	Jens Carlowitz; LG Chemnitz	46.36 s
800 metres	Jörg Haas; LG Offenburg	1:48.04 min	Peter Braun; MTV Ingolstadt	1:48.28 min	Mark Eplinius; SCC Berlin	1:48.72 min
1500 metres	Jens-Peter Herold; SCC Berlin	3:41.68 min	Hauke Fuhlbrügge; TSV Erfurt	3:42.03 min	Rüdiger Stenzel; TV Wattenscheid	3:42.40 min
5000 metres	Dieter Baumann; LG Bayer Leverkusen	13:35.76 min	Stéphane Franke; SV Salamander Kornwestheim	13:48.12 min	Carsten Eich; Motor Gohlis-Nord Leipzig	13:50.05 min
10,000 metres	Carsten Eich; Motor Gohlis-Nord Leipzig	28:00.55 min	Stéphane Franke; SV Salamander Kornwestheim	28:11.99 min	Martin Bremer; LG Bayer Leverkusen	28:18.21 min
25K run	Kurt Stenzel; ASC Darmstadt	1:17:07 h	Konrad Dobler; SVO Germaringen	1:17:25 h	Eike Loch; LAC Quelle Fürth / München	1:18:44 h
25 kilometres team	LG Rhein-Wied Andernach; Edmund Kaul; Gerhard Jäger; Erik Simonis	4:03:34 h	LG Wipperfürth; Klaus-Peter Nabein; Robert Langfeld; Bernd Feldhoff	4:05:43 h	TSV Burghaslach; Thomas Ertl; Jörg Teiche; Rainer Mühlberg	4:06:58 h
Marathon	Thomas Ertl; TSV Burghaslach	2:21:26 h	Eike Loch; LAC Quelle Fürth / München	2:22:08 h	Jürgen Herzog; SG Walldorf Astoria	2:22:28 h
Marathon team	LAC Quelle Fürth / München; Eike Loch; Udo Reeh; Pedro Sachssendahl	7:21:15 h	LTF Marpingen; Dieter Burkhardt; Rainer Müller; Wolfgang Koch	7:32:13 h	TF Feuerbach; Michael Most; Harry Klingel; Markus Kreimer	8:06:18 h
100 kilometres	Burkhard Lennartz; ASV Sankt Augustin	6:38:04 h	Volker Krajenski; LG Braunschweig	6:45:12 h	Lutz Aderhold; Spiridon Frankfurt	6:46:08 h
100 kilometres team	LG Braunschweig; Volker Krajenski; Helmut Dreyer; Jens Mankopf	21:09:33 h	LTF Marpingen; Volker Becker-Wirbel; Robert Feller; Franz Feller	21:56:49 h	Triathlon Hub/Nürnberg; Hartmut Häber; Karl-Heinz Neudeck; Achim Heukemes	22:58:31 h
110 m hurdles	Florian Schwarthoff; TV Heppenheim	13.25 s	Dietmar Koszewski; LAC Halensee Berlin	13.68 s	Sven Göhler; OSC Potsdam	13.83 s
400 m hurdles	Olaf Hense; LG Olympia Dortmund	49.13 s	Carsten Köhrbrück; LAC Halensee Berlin	49.43 s	Michael Kaul; USC Mainz	49.76 s
3000 m s'chase	Steffen Brand; TV Wattenscheid	8:21.76 min	Hagen Melzer; Dresdner SC	8:28.71 min	Martin Strege; LG Baunatal/ACT Kassel	8:31.46 min
4 × 100 m relay	TV Wattenscheid; Dietmar Schulte; Robert Kurnicki; Michael Huke; Dirk Schweisfurt	39.65 s	LG Bayer Leverkusen; Schu; Guido Kluth; Johannes Wischerhoff; Wolfgang Haupt	39.93 s	LAV Bayer Uerdingen / Dormagen; Nusselein; Stefan Peters; Kutscher; Arnold Zawitzki	40.26 s
4 × 400 m relay	LG Olympia Dortmund; Stefan Godek; Udo Schiller; Bodo Unger; Olaf Hense	3:07.03 min	LG Bayer Leverkusen; Daniel Bittner; Michael Grün; Markus Rau; Sven Matuschik	3:08.33 min	LG VfB/Kickers Stuttgart; Jürgen Mehl; Michael Fahrenkamp; Rolf Setzer; Ralph Pfersich	3:09.31 min
4 × 800 m relay	SCC Berlin; Jörg Schneider; John-Henry May; Mike Kemsies; Mark Eplinius	7:21.41 min	MTV Ingolstadt; Alfred Hummel; Hans Stamm; Dieter Gabriel; Peter Braun	7:28.81 min	LC Rehlingen; Michael Simon; Andreas Rettig; Werner Klein; Thomas Klein	7:29.70 min
4 × 1500 m relay	SCC Berlin; Andreas Wagner; Neumann; Rainer Sudau; Jens-Peter Herold	15:19.27 min	TV Wattenscheid; Stephan Plätzer; Ingo Janich; Steffen Brand; Rüdiger Stenzel	15:27.12 min	Hamburger SV; Möller; Lars Brechtel; Andreas Fischer; Christoph Meyer	15:37.28 min
20 km walk	Robert Ihly; LG Offenburg	1:23:40 h	Axel Noack; TSV Erfurt	1:24:07 h	Ralf Weise; TSV Erfurt	1:24:15 h
20 km walk team	TSV Erfurt; Axel Noack; Ralf Weise; Hartwig Gauder	4:14:11 h	LAC Quelle Fürth / München; Ralf Rose; Peter Zanner; Alfons Schwarz	4:24:48 h	Berliner SV 1892; Volkmar Scholz; Detlef Heitmann; Detlev Winkler	4:39:26 h
50 km walk	Ronald Weigel; LAC Halensee Berlin	3:51:37 h	Hartwig Gauder; TSV Erfurt	3:57:31 h	Volkmar Scholz; Berliner SV 1892	4:08:07 h
50 km walk team	Berliner SV 1892; Volkmar Scholz; Carlo Müller; Karl Degener	12:57:09 h	Only one team finished			
High jump	Ralf Sonn; TSG Weinheim	2.32 m	Wolf-Hendrik Beyer; LG Bayer Leverkusen	2.32 m	Dietmar Mögenburg; TV Wattenscheid	2.30 m
Pole vault	Mark Lugenbühl; ASV Landau	5.55 m	Kai Atzbacher; LG Frankfurt	5.50 m	Stefan Diebler; TuS Jena	5.40 m
Long jump	Dietmar Haaf; SV Salamander Kornwestheim	8.16 m	André Müller; SC Empor Rostock	7.99 m	Konstantin Krause; TV Wattenscheid	7.90 m
Triple jump	Ralf Jaros; TV Wattenscheid	17.11 m	Wolfgang Knabe; TV Wattenscheid	16.62 m	Kersten Wolters; TSG Bergedorf	16.45 m
Shot put	Ulf Timmermann; OSC Berlin	20.46 m	Oliver-Sven Buder; TV Wattenscheid	19.70 m	Kalman Konya; SV Salamander Kornwestheim	19.62 m
Discus throw	Lars Riedel; USC Mainz	65.96 m	Jürgen Schult; Schweriner SC	65.02 m	Michael Möllenbeck; Eintracht Frankfurt	60.82 m
Hammer throw	Heinz Weis; LG Bayer Leverkusen	79.22 m	Claus Dethloff; LG Bayer Leverkusen	75.52 m	Christoph Sahner; TV Wattenscheid	74.60 m
Javelin throw	Volker Hadwich; SC Magdeburg	82.26 m	Stefan König; TV Wattenscheid	80.40 m	Ralph Willinski; LG Bayer Leverkusen	78.42 m
Decathlon	Stefan Schmid; LG Karlstadt	7992P	Norbert Lampe; SC Magdeburg	7587 pts	Dirk Pajonk; LG Bayer Leverkusen	7496 pts
Decathlon team	LG Bayer Leverkusen; Paul Meier; Dirk Pajonk; Kurowski	22.197 pts	USC Mainz; Christian Deick; Peter Neumaier; Stephan Kallenberg	21.854 pts	SC Magdeburg; Norbert Lampe; Sandro Lange; Hans-Ulrich Riecke	20.554 pts
Cross country short course – 4.2 km	Hauke Fuhlbrügge; TSV Erfurt	12:15 min	Klaus-Peter Nabein; LAC Quelle Fürth / München	12:19 min	Uwe König; SCC Berlin	12:22 min
Cross country short course, Team	SCC Berlin; Uwe König; Olaf Beyer; Jens-Peter Herold	37:28 min	Hamburger SV; Christoph Meyer; Andreas Fischer; Lars Brechtel	38:29 min	LG Nordheide; Michael Witt; Peter Hempel; Rolf Helmboldt	38:34 min
Cross country long course – 10.5 km	Rainer Wachenbrunner; Berliner SC	31:55 min	Werner Schildhauer; USV Halle	32:01 min	Steffen Dittmann; Racing-Club Berlin	32:25 min
Cross country long course, Team	SV Saar 05 Saarbrücken; Alexander Gunkel; Markus Neukirch; Alfred Knickenberg	1:40:29 h	OSC Berlin; Michael Heilmann; Martin Seeber; Christian Schieber	1:40:47 h	LC Euskirchen; Heinz-Bernd Bürger; Frank Kase; Sven Wille	1:41:01 h
Mountain running	Guido Dold; LC Breisgau	47:11 min	Paul Deuritz; LAG Mittlere Isar	47:42 min	Jörg Leipner; LG Frankfurt	47:59 min
Mountain running team	LC Breisgau; Guido Dold; Dirk Debertin; Steffen Grosse	2:25:08 h	LG Frankfurt; Jörg Leipner; Wolfgang Münzel; Volker Isigkeit	2:25:51 h	SG Adelsberg; Heiko Schinkitz; Koritz; Andre Neubauer	2:32:01 h

=== Women ===
Event	Gold		Silver		Bronze	
100 metres	Heike Drechsler; TuS Jena	11.33 s	Silke-Beate Knoll; LG Olympia Dortmund	11.44 s	Silke Möller; SC Empor Rostock	11.46 s
200 metres	Silke-Beate Knoll; LG Olympia Dortmund	22.50 s	Andrea Thomas; VfL Sindelfingen	22.89 s	Sabine Günther; TuS Jena	23.04 s
400 metres	Anja Rücker; TuS Jena	51.86 s	Linda Kisabaka; LG Bayer Leverkusen	52.01 s	Helga Arendt; LG Olympia Dortmund	52.03 s
800 metres	Christine Wachtel; SC Empor Rostock	1:59.38 min	Sigrun Grau; SC Neubrandenburg	1:59.49 min	Sabine Zwiener; LG Stuttgart	1:59.83 min
1500 metres	Ellen Kießling; Dresdner SC	4:14.89 min	Katje Hoffmann; SCC Berlin	4:17.13 min	Heike Oehme; Hamburger SV	4:17.39 min
3000 metres	Claudia Borgschulze; LG Olympia Dortmund	9:01.60 min	Katje Hoffmann; SCC Berlin	9:03.02 min	Claudia Metzner; BV Teutonia Dortmund	9:03.41 min
10,000 metres	Kathrin Ullrich; Berliner SC	31:20.62 min	Uta Pippig; SCC Berlin	31:21.36 min	Kerstin Preßler; Neuköllner Sportfreunde	32:09.64 min
15K run	Kerstin Preßler; Neuköllner Sportfreunde	49:45 min	Iris Biba; TV Gelnhausen	50:07 min	Claudia Borgschulze; LG Olympia Dortmund	50:57 min
15 kilometres team	LG Olympia Dortmund; Claudia Borgschulze; Claudia Dreher; Gabriele Wolf	2:36:05 h	VfL Wolfsburg; Petra Liebertz; Ursula Starke; Anne Toffel	2:48:45 h	USV Halle; Sylvia Renz; Sandra Lachmann; Katrin Tanzmann	2:51:38 h
Marathon	Manuela Veith; TV Bodenheim	2:46:33 h	Bernadette Hudy; LLC Marathon Regensburg	2:46:54 h	Sigrid Altmeyer; LAV Bayer Uerdingen / Dormagen	2:51:32 h
Marathon team	LAV Bayer Uerdingen / Dormagen; Sigrid Altmeyer; Petra Sander; Petra Bauer	9:08:06 h	DLC Aachen; Gabriele Reiners; Birgit Linnartz; Maria Theissen	9:17:23 h	Eichenkreuz Schwaikheim; Gudrun Rüth; Hannelore Nothdurft; Claudia Müller	9:57:37 h
100 kilometres	Birgit Lennartz-Lohrengel; ASV Sankt Augustin	7:27:02 h	Iris Reuter; TVDÄ Hanau	8:09:37 h	Katharina Janicke; LC Olympia Wiesbaden	8:13:05 h
100 kilometres team	SCC Berlin; Sigrid Lomsky; Helga Backhaus; Christel Heine	25:28:28 h	DLC Aachen; Maria Theißen; Marianne Gerards; Rosi Grawinkel	27:44:16 h	LTF Marpingen; Angelika Warken; Martina Eckert; Marga Reidenbach	29:59:20 h
100 m hurdles	Sabine Braun; TV Wattenscheid	13.05 s	Caren Jung; MTG Mannheim	13.10 s	Kirstin Patzwahl; SC DHfK Leipzig	13.14 s
400 m hurdles	Heike Meißner; Dresdner SC	55.09 s	Silvia Rieger; TuS Eintracht Hinte	55.33 s	Ulrike Heinz; TSG Wiesloch	56.28 s
4 × 100 m relay	VfL Sindelfingen; Doreen Fahrendorff; Ulrike Sarvari; Andrea Thomas; Birgit Wolf	44.72 s	LG Bayer Leverkusen; Anja Böhme; Silke Lichtenhagen; Stefanie Hütz; Linda Kisabaka	45.12 s	LG Olympia Dortmund; Tielkes; Martina Kersting; Hagen; Silke-Beate Knoll	45.14 s
4 × 400 m relay	LG Olympia Dortmund; Sandra Kuschmann; Helga Arendt; Ruth Scheppan; Silke-Beate Knoll	3:31.18 min	SCC Berlin; Manuela Peters; Ines Conradi; Sandra Seuser; Nicole Leistenschneider	3:34.25 min	VfL Sindelfingen; Andrea Thomas; Doreen Fahrendorff; Gaby Dold; Birgit Wolf	3:38.13 min
3 × 800 m relay	SCC Berlin; Angela Wilhelm; Carmen Wüstenhagen; Kati Kovac	6:26.27 min	Eintracht Frankfurt; Gabriele Huber; Steffi Kallensee; Gabriela Lesch	6:38.87 min	VfL Sindelfingen; Katrin Kramer; Gaby Dold; Ina Bachmann	6:39.99 min
5000 m walk	Beate Anders; LAC Halensee Berlin	21:25.72 min	Kathrin Born; Berliner SC	21:58.03 min	Simone Thust; LAC Halensee Berlin	22:22.27 min
10 km walk	Beate Anders; LAC Halensee Berlin	43:18 min	Kathrin Born; Berliner SC	44:07 min	Andrea Brückmann; LAZ Lahn-Aar-Diez	44:22 min
10 km walk team	LAC Halensee Berlin; Beate Anders; Simone Thust; Sandra Priemer	2:20:00 h	Berliner SC; Kathrin Born; Helge Will; Doreen Sellenriek	2:22:52 h	SpVgg. Niederaichbach; Renate Warz; Brigitte Buck; Gabriele Daffner	2:27:08 h
High jump	Heike Henkel; LG Bayer Leverkusen	2.03 m	Birgit Kähler; LAV Bayer Uerdingen / Dormagen	1.90 m	Maja Fahrig; SC Magdeburg	1.88 m
Pole vault	Daniela Köpernick; SC Cottbus	3.80 m	Carmen Haage; LG Herlazhofen-Diepoldshofen	3.70 m	Christine Adams; SuS Dinslaken	3.70 m
Long jump	Heike Drechsler; TuS Jena	7.21 m	Helga Radtke; SC Empor Rostock	6.53 m	Claudia Gerhardt; VfL Gladbeck	6.42 m
Triple jump	Petra Laux; LAG Siegen	13.50 m	Tanja Borrmann; LG Bayer Leverkusen	13.06 m	Ramona Molzan; OSC Potsdam	13.03 m
Shot put	Kathrin Neimke; SC Cottbus	19.45 m	Stephanie Storp; VfL Wolfsburg	19.02 m	Claudia Losch; LAC Quelle Fürth / München	18.86 m
Discus throw	Ilke Wyludda; SV Halle	66.88 m	Martina Hellmann; BSV AOK Leipzig	64.96 m	Franka Dietzsch; SC Neubrandenburg	61.88 m
Javelin throw	Silke Renk; SV Halle	64.40 m	Yvonne Reichardt; SV Saar 05 Saarbrücken	59.74 m	Steffi Nerius; LG Bayer Leverkusen	59.46 m
Heptathlon	Birgit Clarius; MTV Ingolstadt	6147 pts	Beatrice Mau; TK Hannover	6022 pts	Mona Steigauf; USC Mainz	5809 pts
Heptathlon team	LG Bayer Leverkusen; Bettina Braag; Silke Knut; Anke Straschewski	16.278 pts	TK Hannover; Beatrice Mau; Daniela Grube; Petra Köpcke	16.093 pts	USC Mainz; Mona Steigauf; Ulrike Karst; Gudrun Sauerwein	14.927 pts
Cross country short course – 2.1 km	Claudia Metzner; BV Teutonia Dortmund	6:33 min	Katje Hoffmann; SCC Berlin	6:36 min	Annette Hüls; LG Bayer Leverkusen	6:37 min
Cross country short course, Team	LG Bayer Leverkusen; Annette Hüls; Theophil; Katrin Steinmetz	20:16 min	SCC Berlin; Katje Hoffmann; Nicole Leistenschneider; Rebecca Rajenkowski	21:00 min	LG Frankfurt; Vera Michallek; Sabine Leist; Pollikeit	21:13 min
Cross country long course – 6.3 km	Claudia Borgschulze; LG Olympia Dortmund	21:52 min	Tanja Kalinowski; LG Bayer Leverkusen	22:01 min	Kerstin Herzberg; LBV Phönix Lübeck	22:02 min
Cross country long course, Team	LG Olympia Dortmund; Claudia Borgschulze; Christina Mai; Gabriele Wolf	1:07:15 min	ASV Köln; Sabine Mann; Anna-Isabel Holtkamp; Ute Jenke	1:10:10 min	VfL Wolfsburg; Petra Liebertz; Ursula Starke; Anne Toffel	1:10:37 min
Mountain running	Bernadette Hudy; LC Breisgau	58:13 min	Stefania Wentland; TV Hatzenbühl	59:18 min	Britta Müller; VfL Freudenstadt	59:31 min
Mountain running team	LC Breisgau; Sonja Ambrosy; Monika Imgraben; Benz	3:08:39 h	LG Frankfurt; Silke Welt; Pollikeit; P. Holly	3:13:35 h	Freiburger FC; Barbara Guerike; Bürklin; Lacotas-Schmittel	3:19:09 h
