= 2002 German Athletics Championships =

- Dates: 5–7 July 2002
- Host city: Bochum-Wattenscheid, Germany
- Venue: Lohrheidestadion
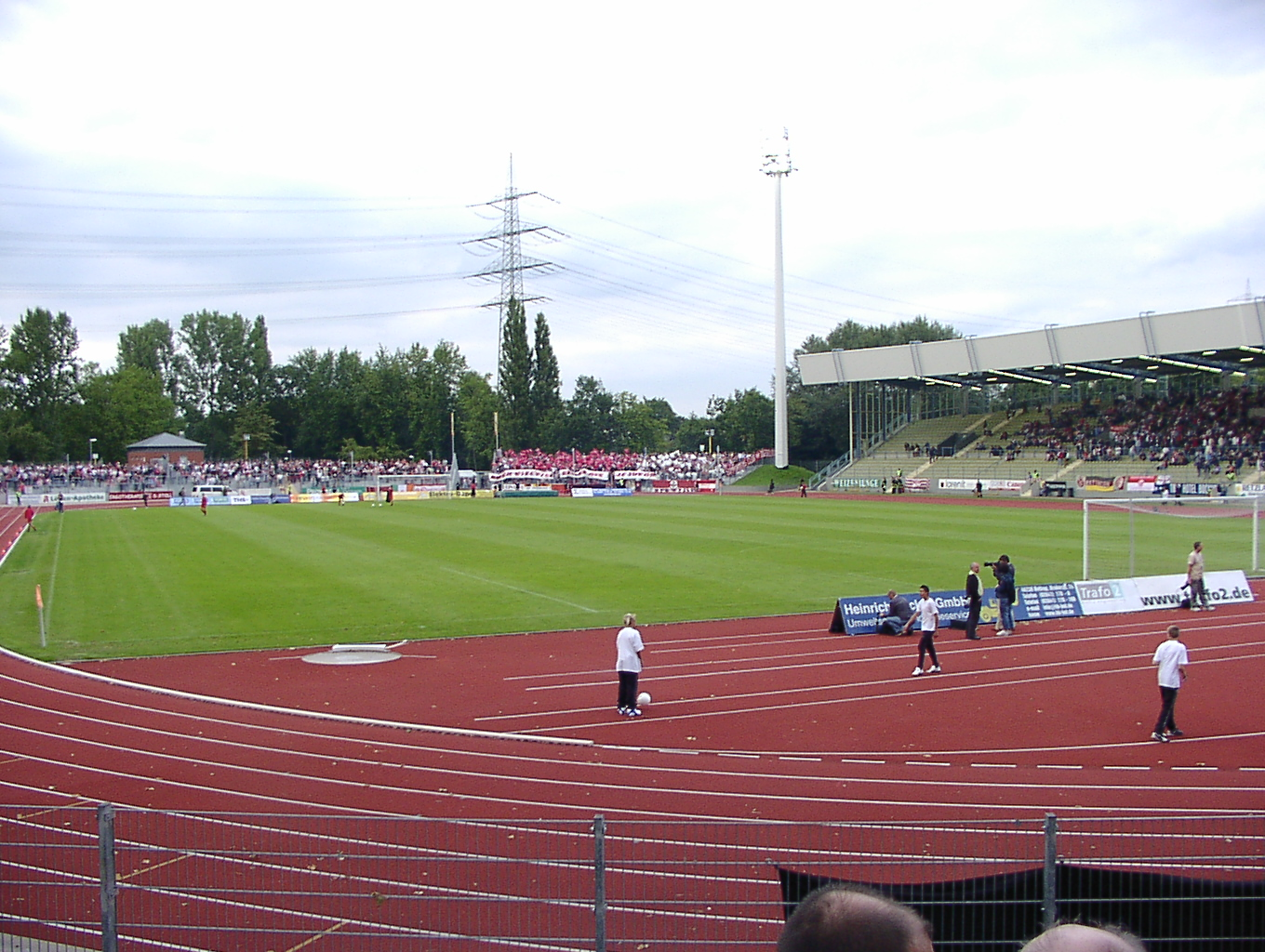
- Records set: 1 European Record; 1 National Record

The 2002 German Athletics Championships were held at the Lohrheidestadion in Bochum-Wattenscheid on 5–7 July 2002.

== Results ==
=== Men ===
Event	Gold	
100 m (−0.1 m/s)	Marc Blume	10.27
200 m (−1.6 m/s)	Marc Blume	20.87
400 m	Ingo Schultz	44.97
800 m	René Herms	1:45.85
1500 m	Franek Haschke	3:43.02
5000 m	Jan Fitschen	13:41.89
10,000 m walk	André Höhne	40:45.82
110 m hurdles (+0.5 m/s)	Florian Schwarthoff	13.69
400 m hurdles	Henning Hackelbusch	50.26
3000 m steeplechase	Filmon Ghirmai	8:35.77
Triple jump	Charles Friedek	16.70
Long jump	Schahriar Bigdeli	7.84
High jump	Martin Buß	2.25
Pole vault	Lars Börgeling	5.80
Shot put	Ralf Bartels	20.29
Discus throw	Michael Möllenbeck	65.83
Hammer throw	Karsten Kobs	76.05
Javelin throw	Raymond Hecht	87.23
4 × 100 m relay	TV Wattenscheid 01 I Holger Blume; Marc Blume; Alexander Kosenkow; Jerome Crews	39.35
4 × 400 m relay	LG Olympia Dortmund I Michael Dragu; Sebastian Aryee; Jörg Krick; Ingo Schultz	3:06.68

=== Women ===
Event	Gold	
100 m (−0.4 m/s)	Sina Schielke	11.28
200 m (−1.4 m/s)	Gabi Rockmeier	23.43
400 m	Birgit Rockmeier	52.03
800 m	Claudia Gesell	2:00.97
1500 m	Kathleen Friedrich	4:10.99
5000 m	Sabrina Mockenhaupt	15:46.92
5000 m walk	Melanie Seeger	21:28.58
100 m hurdles (−0.6 m/s)	Kirsten Bolm	13.03
400 m hurdles	Heike Meißner	55.74
3000 m steeplechase	Melanie Schulz	9:38.31
Triple jump	Henny Gastel	13.54
Long jump	Heike Drechsler	6.64
High jump	Elena Herzenberg	1.91
Pole vault	Annika Becker	4.77
Shot put	Astrid Kumbernuss	19.45
Discus throw	Jana Tucholke	58.99
Hammer throw	Susanne Keil	66.33
Javelin throw	Dörthe Friedrich	64.46
4 × 100 m relay	LG Olympia Dortmund I Sandra Möller; Gabi Rockmeier; Sina Schielke; Katchi Habel	44.06
4 × 400 m relay	SC Magdeburg I Eileen Müller; Ivonne Teichmann; Korinna Fink; Grit Breuer	3:32.11
