= 2003 German Athletics Championships =

- Dates: 28–29 June 2003
- Host city: Ulm, Germany
- Venue: Donaustadion
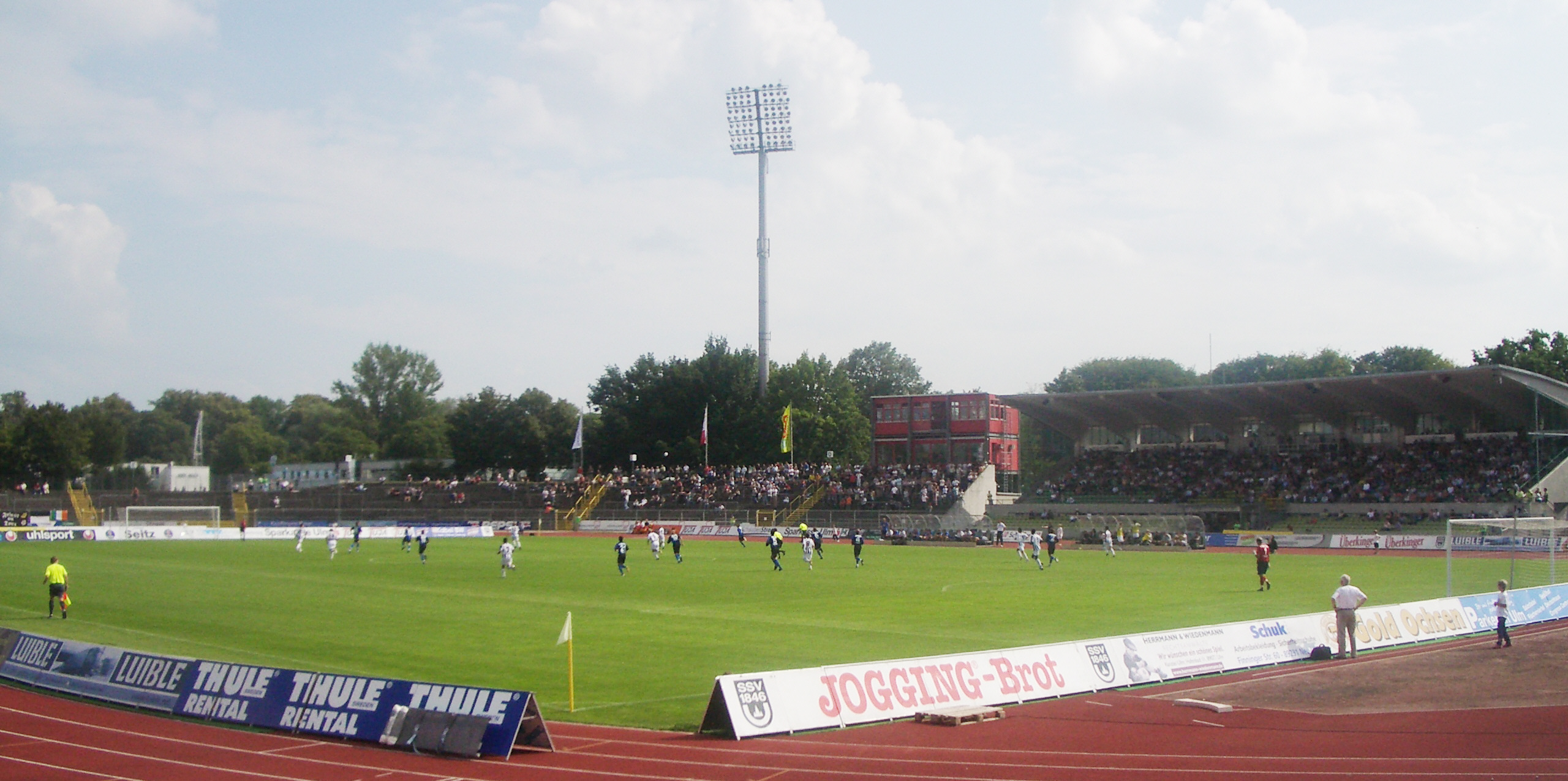
- Records set: 1 Championship Record

The 2003 German Athletics Championships were held at the Donaustadion in Ulm on 28–29 June 2003.

== Results ==
=== Men ===
Event	Gold	
100 m (+0.5 m/s)	Alexander Kosenkow	10.25
200 m (+0.4 m/s)	Tobias Unger	20.80
400 m	Ingo Schultz	45.29
800 m	René Herms	1:47.62
1500 m	Franek Haschke	3:49.97
5000 m	Dieter Baumann	13:41.22
10,000 m walk	Andreas Erm	40:58.79
110 m hurdles (−0.8 m/s)	Jerome Crews	13.54
400 m hurdles	Christian Duma	50.01
3000 m steeplechase	Christian Knoblich	8:34.76
Triple jump	Rudolf Helpling	16.78
Long jump	Nils Winter	7.89
High jump	Roman Fricke	2.25
Pole vault	Tim Lobinger	5.75
Shot put	Ralf Bartels	20.22
Discus throw	Lars Riedel	66.60
Hammer throw	Karsten Kobs	77.98
Javelin throw	Boris Henry	84.92
4 × 100 m relay	TV Wattenscheid 01 I Ronny Ostwald; Marc Blume; Alexander Kosenkow; Holger Blume	39.23
4 × 400 m relay	LG Eintracht Frankfurt I Henning Kuschewitz; Tilo Ruch; Stefan Bönisch; Christian Duma	3:08.37

=== Women ===
Event	Gold	
100 m (−0.5 m/s)	Melanie Paschke	11.41
200 m (−1.2 m/s)	Gabi Rockmeier	23.01
400 m	Claudia Marx	52.00
800 m	Claudia Gesell	2:01.07
1500 m	Kathleen Friedrich	4:21.86
5000 m	Sabrina Mockenhaupt	15:51.73
5000 m walk	Melanie Seeger	20:56.19
100 m hurdles (−0.3 m/s)	Nadine Hentschke	13.14
400 m hurdles	Stephanie Kampf	56.03
3000 m steeplechase	Katrin Engelen	10:34.13
Triple jump	Katja Demut	13.45
Long jump	Bianca Kappler	6.44
High jump	Melanie Skotnik	1.90
Pole vault	Yvonne Buschbaum	4.70
Shot put	Astrid Kumbernuss	19.36
Discus throw	Franka Dietzsch	62.86
Hammer throw	Susanne Keil	71.15
Javelin throw	Steffi Nerius	64.42
4 × 100 m relay	LG Olympia Dortmund I Katchi Habel; Gabi Rockmeier; Sandra Möller; Birgit Rockmeier	44.84
4 × 400 m relay	LG Nike Berlin I Nadine Balkow; Sandra Schmadtke; Anja Neupert; Claudia Marx	3:37.76
