= 2005 German Athletics Championships =

- Dates: 2–3 July 2005
- Host city: Bochum-Wattenscheid, Germany
- Venue: Lohrheidestadion
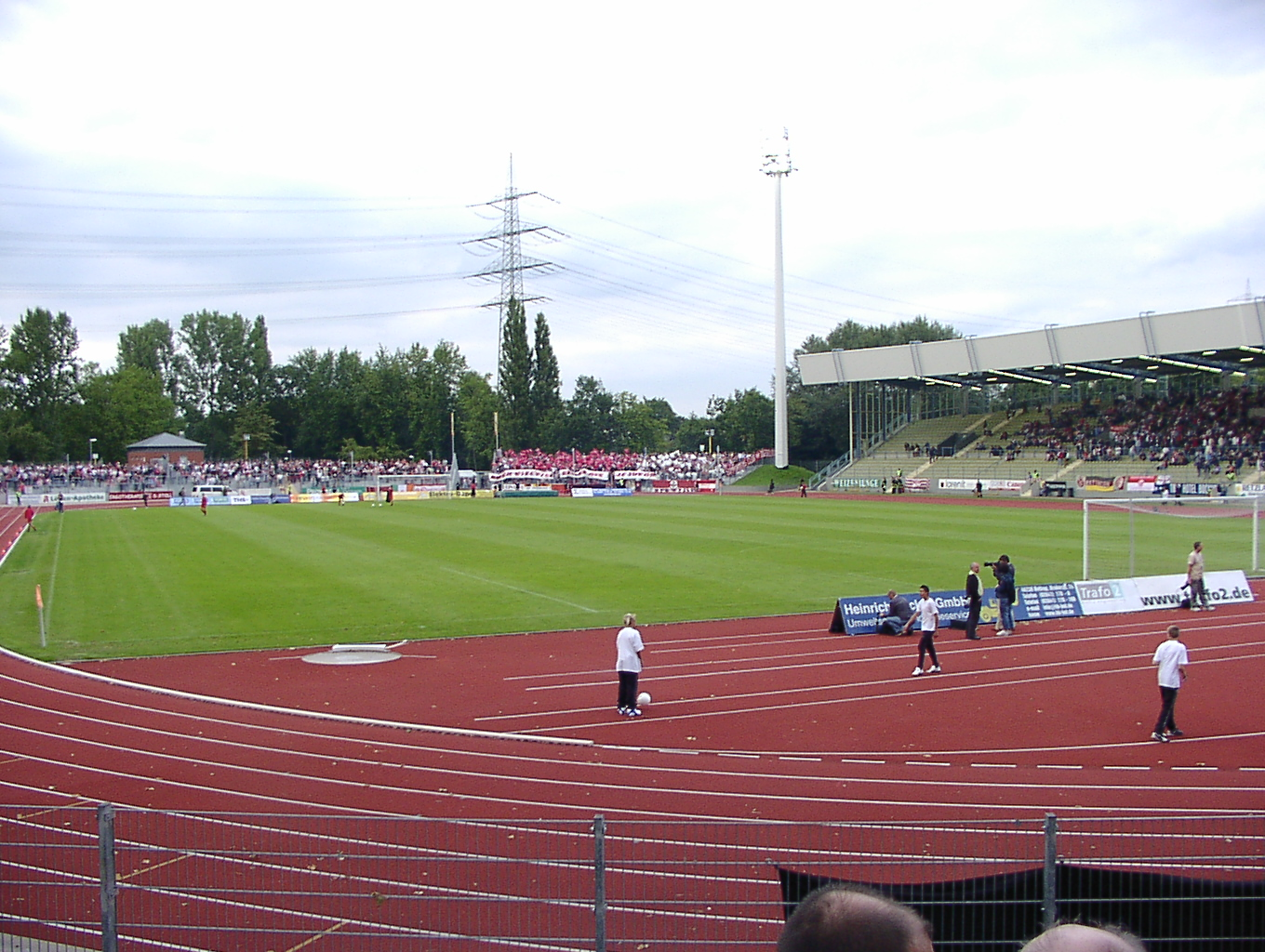
- Records set: 2 National Records, 2 Championship Records

The 2005 German Athletics Championships were held at the Lohrheidestadion in Bochum-Wattenscheid on 2–3 July 2005.

== Results ==
=== Men ===
Event	Gold	
100 m (+0.3 m/s)	Tobias Unger	10.16
200 m (+0.7 m/s)	Tobias Unger	20.20
400 m	Simon Kirch	45.95
800 m	René Herms	1:45.39
1500 m	Franek Haschke	3:40.39
5000 m	Jan Fitschen	13:39.71
10,000 m walk	Jan Albrecht	39:48.94
110 m hurdles (+0.6 m/s)	Thomas Blaschek	13.49
400 m hurdles	Christian Duma	49.69
3000 m steeplechase	Filmon Ghirmai	8:34.10
Triple jump	Charles Friedek	16.89
Long jump	Nils Winter	8.03
High jump	Eike Onnen	2.26
Pole vault	Tim Lobinger	5.75
Shot put	Ralf Bartels	20.67
Discus throw	Michael Möllenbeck	64.12
Hammer throw	Karsten Kobs	78.13
Javelin throw	Christian Nicolay	81.73
4 × 100 m relay	TV Wattenscheid 01 I Holger Blume; Marc Blume; Alexander Kosenkow; Jan-Christopher Schulte	39.36
4 × 400 m relay	LG Eintracht Frankfurt I Tilo Ruch; Henning Kuschewitz; Thomas Wilhelm; Kamghe Gaba	3:08.04

=== Women ===
Event	Gold	
100 m (+1.1 m/s)	Birgit Rockmeier	11.33
200 m (+1.5 m/s)	Birgit Rockmeier	23.05
400 m	Claudia Hoffmann	52.51
800 m	Monika Gradzki	2:03.51
1500 m	Antje Möldner	4:12.38
5000 m	Sabrina Mockenhaupt	15:09.39
5000 m walk	Sabine Zimmer	20:11.45
100 m hurdles (+0.9 m/s)	Kirsten Bolm	12.84
400 m hurdles	Claudia Marx	56.14
3000 m steeplechase	Verena Dreier	10:06.51
Triple jump	Silvia Otto	13.56
Long jump	Bianca Kappler	6.49
High jump	Daniela Rath	1.84
Pole vault	Silke Spiegelburg	4.40
Shot put	Nadine Kleinert	18.68
Discus throw	Franka Dietzsch	64.19
Hammer throw	Betty Heidler	70.34
Javelin throw	Steffi Nerius	64.54
4 × 100 m relay	DLV U-20 I Katja Börner; Sarah Heinrich; Maike Dix; Jala Gangnus	44.43
4 × 400 m relay	LG Nike Berlin I Katharina Gröb; Anja Neupert; Julia-Kristin Kunz; Nadine Balkow	3:37.28
