= 2004 German Athletics Championships =

- Dates: 10–11 July 2004
- Host city: Braunschweig, Germany
- Venue: Eintracht-Stadion
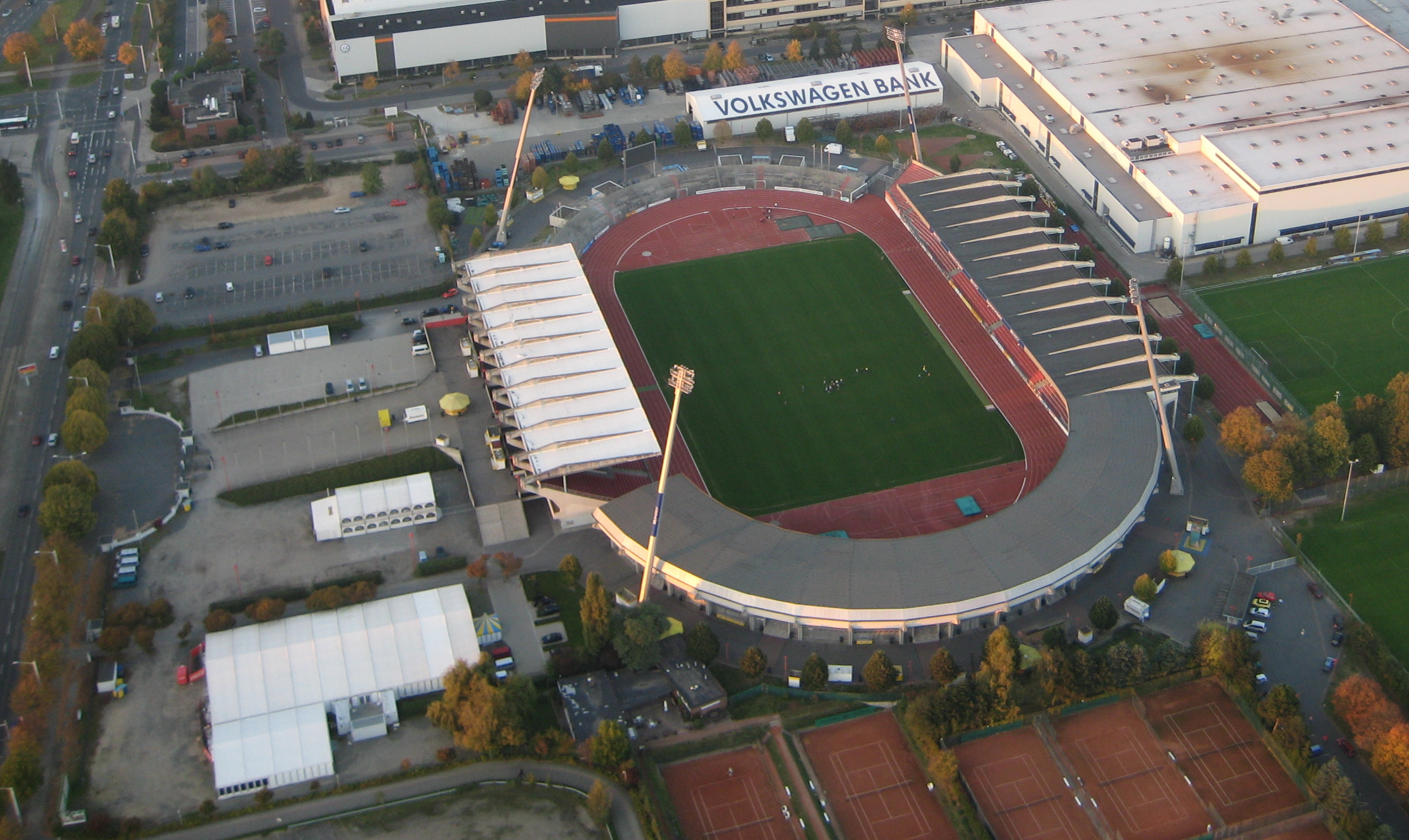
- Records set: 1 National Record, 1 Championship Record

The 2004 German Athletics Championships were held at the Eintracht-Stadion in Braunschweig on 10–11 July 2004.

== Results ==
=== Men ===
Event	Gold	
100 m (+1.4 m/s)	Ronny Ostwald	10.22
200 m (−0.7 m/s)	Tobias Unger	20.42
400 m	Ingo Schultz	45.95
800 m	René Herms	1:49.03
1500 m	Wolfram Müller	3:46.35
5000 m	Oliver Dietz	13:53.06
10,000 m walk	Andreas Erm	38:51.51
110 m hurdles (0.0 m/s)	Mike Fenner	13.54
400 m hurdles	Christian Duma	50.29
3000 m steeplechase	Filmon Ghirmai	8:38.91
Triple jump	Andreas Pohle	16.99
Long jump	Schahriar Bigdeli	7.78 (w. +2.7 m/s)
High jump	Roman Fricke	2.17
Pole vault	Daniel Ecker	5.70
Shot put	Ralf Bartels	20.37
Discus throw	Michael Möllenbeck	63.14
Hammer throw	Karsten Kobs	78.07
Javelin throw	Boris Henry	86.36
4 × 100 m relay	TV Wattenscheid 01 I Holger Blume; Marc Blume; Alexander Kosenkow; Jan-Christopher Schulte	39.40
4 × 400 m relay	LG Eintracht Frankfurt I Henning Kuschewitz; Sebastian Gatzka; Kamghe Gaba; Tilo Ruch	3:08.81

=== Women ===
Event	Gold	
100 m (−1.4 m/s)	Sina Schielke	11.26
200 m (−2.8 m/s)	Sina Schielke	23.73
400 m	Claudia Marx	52.94
800 m	Anja Knippel	2:06.95
1500 m	Kathleen Friedrich	4:10.78
5000 m	Sabrina Mockenhaupt	15:20.82
5000 m walk	Melanie Seeger	20:18.87
100 m hurdles (0.0 m/s)	Kirsten Bolm	12.82
400 m hurdles	Anja Neupert	55.63
3000 m steeplechase	Melanie Schulz	10:22.08
Triple jump	Silvia Otto	13.21
Long jump	Urszula Gutowicz-Westhof	6.51 (w. +2.1 m/s)
High jump	Ariane Friedrich	1.90
Pole vault	Carolin Hingst	4.50
Shot put	Astrid Kumbernuss	19.08
Discus throw	Franka Dietzsch	64.41
Hammer throw	Andrea Bunjes	68.93
Javelin throw	Steffi Nerius	62.82
4 × 100 m relay	LG Olympia Dortmund I Katchi Habel; Sina Schielke; Birgit Rockmeier; Gabi Rockmeier	44.51
4 × 400 m relay	LG Nike Berlin I Katharina Gröb; Nadine Balkow; Anja Neupert; Claudia Marx	3:37.54
