= 2006 German Athletics Championships =

- Dates: 15–16 July 2006
- Host city: Ulm, Germany
- Venue: Donaustadion
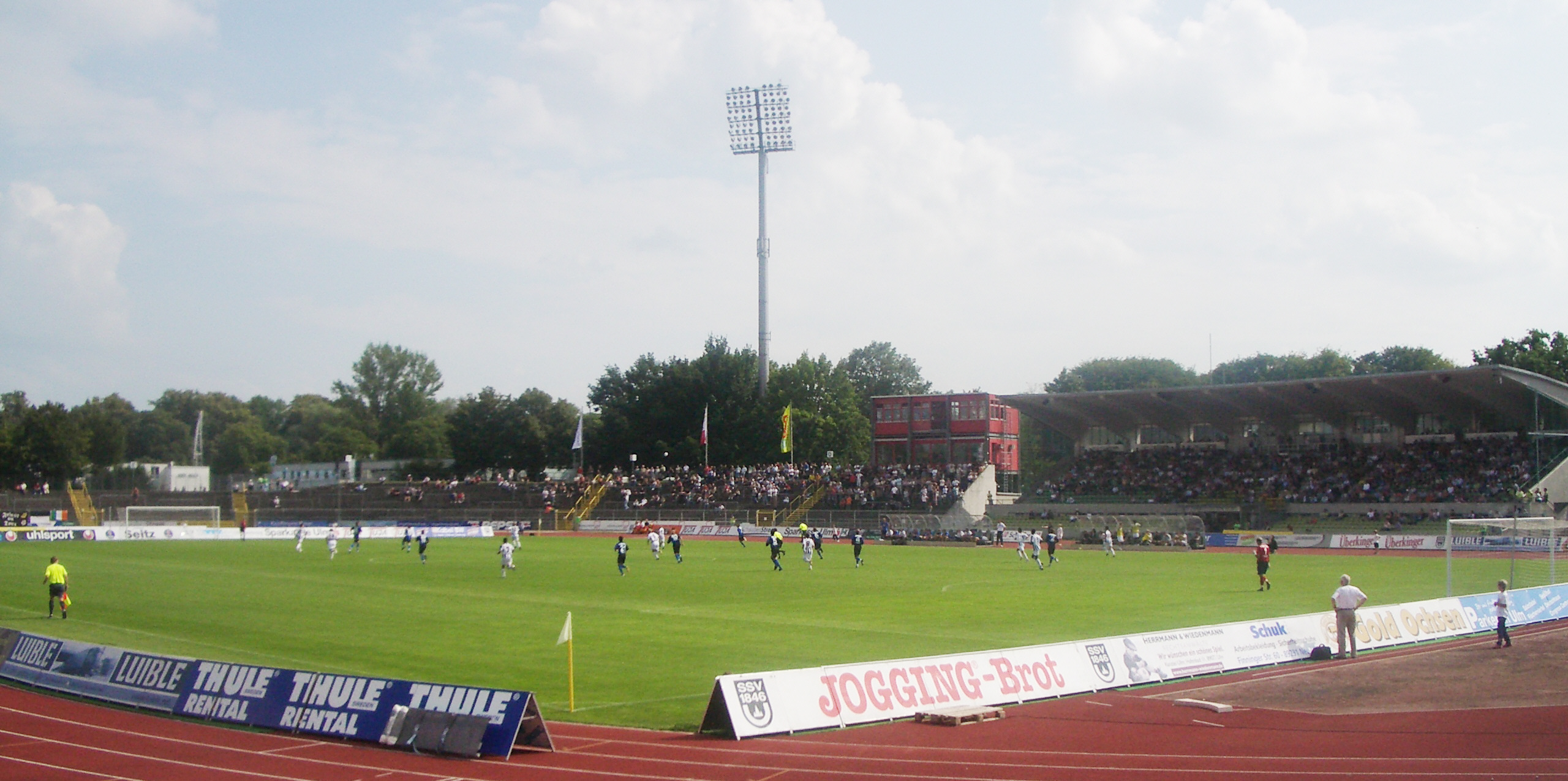
- Records set: 1 Championship Record

The 2006 German Athletics Championships were held at the Donaustadion in Ulm on 15–16 July 2006.

== Results ==
=== Men ===
Event	Gold	
100 m (−0.5 m/s)	Ronny Ostwald	10.32
200 m (−0.8 m/s)	Sebastian Ernst	20.88
400 m	Kamghe Gaba	45.47
800 m	René Herms	1:47.36
1500 m	Carsten Schlangen	3:42.35
5000 m	Jan Fitschen	13:52.37
110 m hurdles (+1.0 m/s)	Thomas Blaschek	13.38
400 m hurdles	Adrian Schürmann	50.53
3000 m steeplechase	Steffen Uliczka	8:42.06
Triple jump	Andreas Pohle	16.97
Long jump	Sebastian Bayer	7.95
High jump	Eike Onnen	2.23
Pole vault	Lars Börgeling	5.75
Shot put	Ralf Bartels	20.26
Discus throw	Lars Riedel	65.75
Hammer throw	Markus Esser	78.43
Javelin throw	Christian Nicolay	83.72
4 × 100 m relay	TV Wattenscheid 01 I Alexander Kosenkow; Holger Blume; Sebastian Ernst; Ronny Ostwald	39.48
4 × 400 m relay	LG Eintracht Frankfurt I Thomas Wilhelm; Sebastian Gatzka; Stefan Kuhlee; Kamghe Gaba	3:07.94

=== Women ===
Event	Gold	
100 m (−1.2 m/s)	Verena Sailer	11.62
200 m (−0.5 m/s)	Jala Gangnus	23.59
400 m	Claudia Hoffmann	51.86
800 m	Monika Gradzki	2:05.40
1500 m	Kerstin Werner	4:21.41
5000 m	Irina Mikitenko	15:28.00
100 m hurdles (+1.0 m/s)	Kirsten Bolm	12.84
400 m hurdles	Claudia Marx	56.01
3000 m steeplechase	Verena Dreier	9:56.28
Triple jump	Katja Pobanz	13.67
Long jump	Julia Mächtig	6.32
High jump	Julia Hartmann	1.90
Pole vault	Silke Spiegelburg	4.55
Shot put	Petra Lammert	18.89
Discus throw	Franka Dietzsch	66.29
Hammer throw	Betty Heidler	73.59
Javelin throw	Steffi Nerius	65.71
4 × 100 m relay	LG Weserbergland I Nina Giebel; Jala Gangnus; Cathleen Tschirch; Nicole Marahrens	44.79
4 × 400 m relay	LG Nike Berlin I Nadine Balkow; Julia-Kristin Kunz; Anja Neupert; Janin Lindenberg	3:39.38
