= 2001 German Athletics Championships =

- Dates: 29 June – 1 July 2001
- Host city: Stuttgart, Germany
- Venue: Gottlieb-Daimler-Stadion
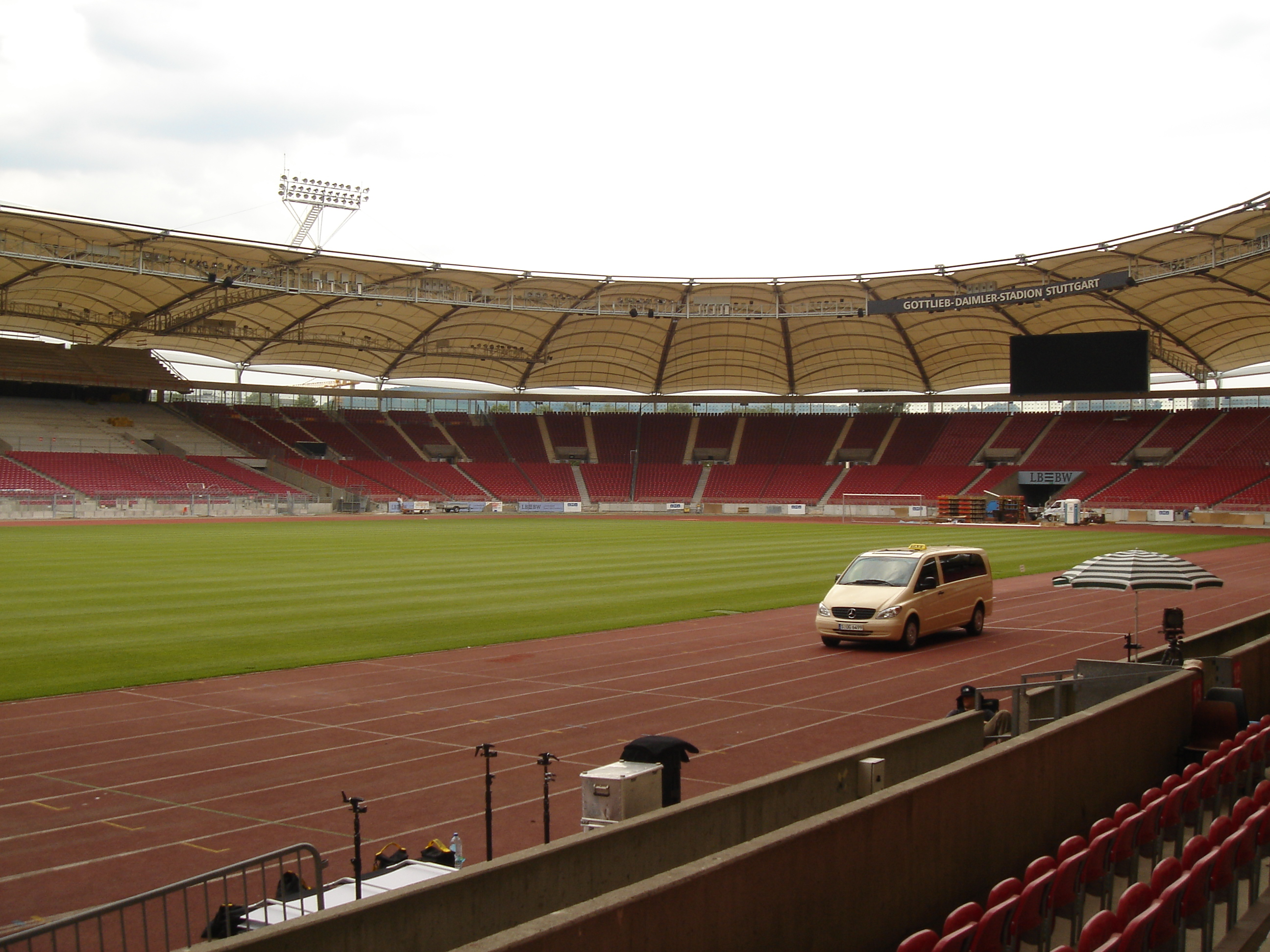
- Records set: 1 National Record; 2 Championship Records

The 2001 German Athletics Championships were held at the Gottlieb-Daimler-Stadion in Stuttgart on 29 June – 1 July 2001.

== Results ==
=== Men ===
Event	Gold	
100 m (+1.2 m/s)	Tim Goebel	10.21
200 m	Alexander Kosenkow	20.64
400 m	Lars Figura	45.93
800 m	René Herms	1:46.81
1500 m	Wolfram Müller	3:37.61
5000 m	Jan Fitschen	13:41.75
10,000 m walk	Andreas Erm	40:42.00
110 m hurdles	Mike Fenner	13.49
400 m hurdles	Jan Schneider	49.63
3000 m steeplechase	Ralf Aßmus	8:28.33
Triple jump	Thomas Moede	16.90
Long jump	Schahriar Bigdeli	8.05
High jump	Martin Buß	2.30
Pole vault	Richard Spiegelburg	5.85
Shot put	Oliver-Sven Buder	19.97
Discus throw	Lars Riedel	67.28
Hammer throw	Karsten Kobs	75.61
Javelin throw	Peter Blank	88.70
4 × 100 m relay	LG Salamander Kornwestheim I Alexander Richling; Christian Schacht; Tobias Unger; Florian Gamper	39.32
4 × 400 m relay	LG Olympia Dortmund I Jens Dautzenberg; Ingo Schultz; Michael Dragu; Lars Figura	3:05.66

=== Women ===
Event	Gold	
100 m (+0.7 m/s)	Gabi Rockmeier	11.17
200 m (−0.1 m/s)	Gabi Rockmeier	22.68
400 m	Grit Breuer	49.78
800 m	Ivonne Teichmann	2:01.78
1500 m	Kathleen Friedrich	4:15.17
5000 m	Sabrina Mockenhaupt	16:04.27
5000 m walk	Melanie Seeger	21:20.76
100 m hurdles (+0.8 m/s)	Kirsten Bolm	12.98
400 m hurdles	Heike Meißner	55.03
Triple jump	Nicole Herschmann	13.54
Long jump	Heike Drechsler	6.65
High jump	Alina Astafei	1.84
Pole vault	Annika Becker	4.55
Shot put	Nadine Kleinert	18.69
Discus throw	Franka Dietzsch	63.31
Hammer throw	Kirsten Münchow	66.72
Javelin throw	Steffi Nerius	61.26
4 × 100 m relay	LG Olympia Dortmund I Katchi Habel; Birgit Rockmeier; Sina Schielke; Gabi Rockmeier	42.99
4 × 400 m relay	Bayer 04 Leverkusen I Dagmar de Haan; Maren Schott; Ulrike Urbansky; Anke Feller	3:33.16
