= 1999 German Athletics Championships =

- Dates: 2–4 July 1999
- Host city: Erfurt, Germany
- Venue: Steigerwaldstadion
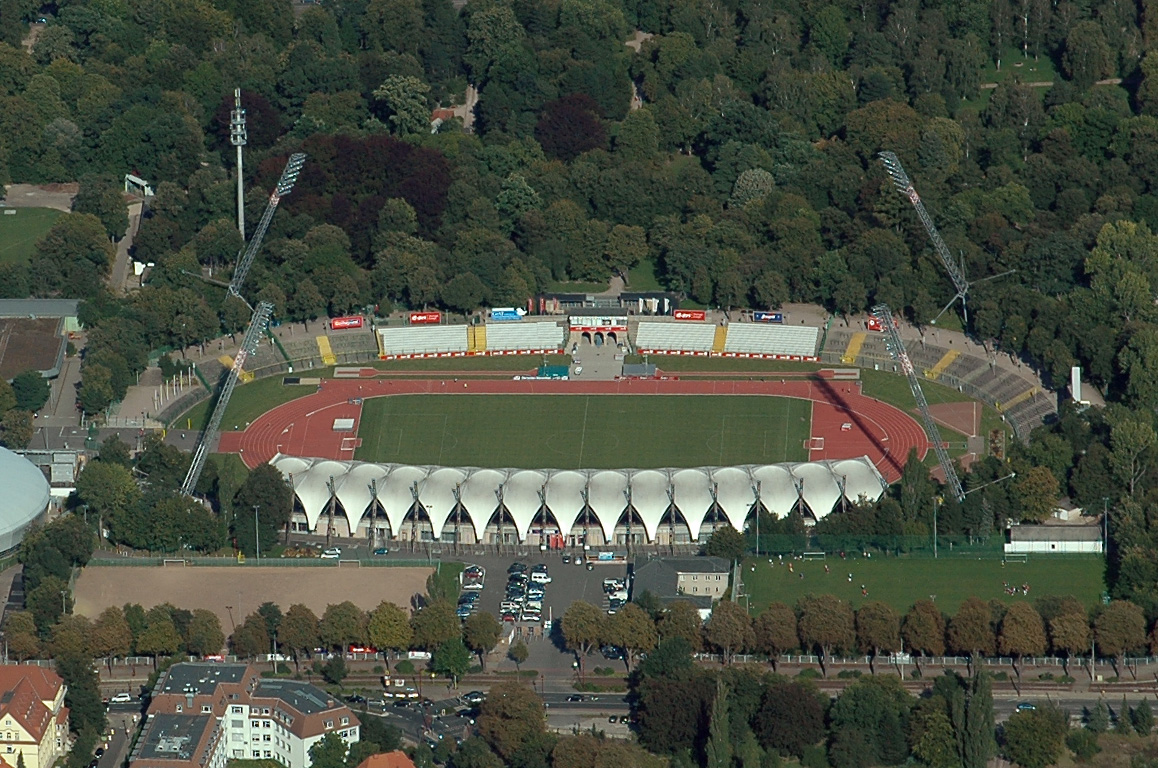
- Records set: 1 National Record; 3 Championship Records

The 1999 German Athletics Championships were held at the Steigerwaldstadion in Erfurt on 2–4 July 1999.

== Results ==
=== Men ===
Event	Gold	
100 m	Holger Blume	10.42
200 m	Stefan Holz	20.68
400 m	Stefan Holz	45.19
800 m	Nils Schumann	1:45.78
1500 m	Rüdiger Stenzel	3:41.49
5000 m	Dieter Baumann	13:46.77
110 m hurdles	Florian Schwarthoff	13.28
400 m hurdles	Thomas Goller	48.83
3000 m steeplechase	André Green	8:30.31
Triple jump	Charles Friedek	17.00
Long jump	Konstantin Krause	8.21
High jump	Martin Buß	2.30
Pole vault	Tim Lobinger	5.90
Shot put	Oliver-Sven Buder	21.15
Discus throw	Jürgen Schult	66.47
Hammer throw	Karsten Kobs	79.53
Javelin throw	Raymond Hecht	86.63
4 × 100 m relay	SV Salamander Kornwestheim I Schulz; Schneider; Höschele; Schacht	39.27
4 × 400 m relay	LAC Quelle I Bönisch; Wörlein; Eplinius; Motchebon	3:07.71

=== Women ===
Event	Gold	
100 m	Andrea Philipp	11.40
200 m	Andrea Philipp	23.09
400 m	Grit Breuer	50.17
800 m	Claudia Gesell	2:01.88
1500 m	Kristina da Fonseca-Wollheim	4:10.49
5000 m	Irina Mikitenko	15:45.21
100 m hurdles	Birgit Hamann	13.04
400 m hurdles	Silvia Rieger	55.09 =
Triple jump	Katja Umlauft	13.43 ^{[w]}
Long jump	Heike Drechsler	6.75
High jump	Heike Henkel	1.90
Pole vault	Yvonne Buschbaum	4.40
Shot put	Astrid Kumbernuss	19.21
Discus throw	Franka Dietzsch	66.33
Hammer throw	Simone Mathes	65.29
Javelin throw	Tanja Damaske	66.91
4 × 100 m relay	LG Olympia Dortmund I Esther Möller; Gabi Rockmeier; Birgit Rockmeier; Andrea Philipp	43.21
4 × 400 m relay	SC Magdeburg I Ulrike Urbansky; Ivonne Teichmann; Heike Meißner; Grit Breuer	3:29.74

- ^{w} : Wind assisted
