= 1997 German Athletics Championships =

- Dates: 27–29 June 1997
- Host city: Frankfurt, Germany
- Venue: Waldstadion
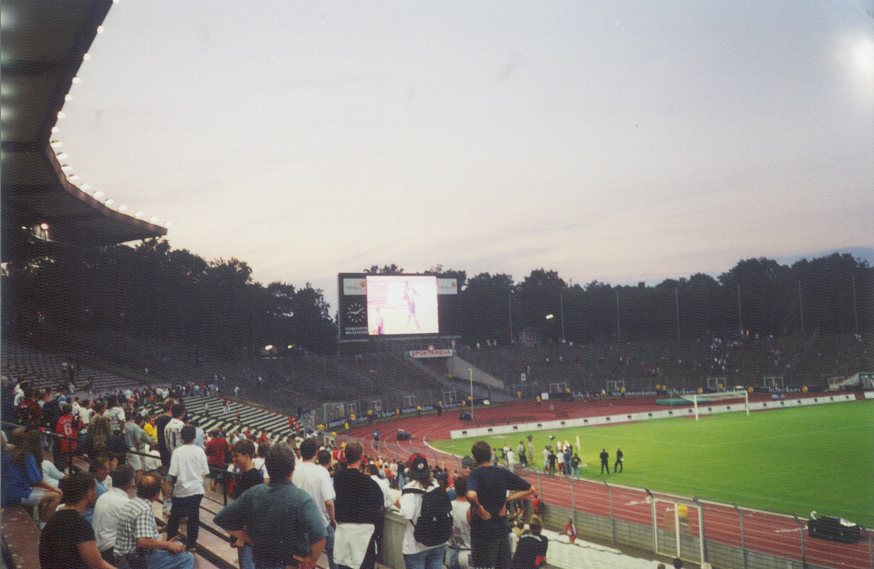
- Records set: 5 Championship Records

The 1997 German Athletics Championships were held at the Waldstadion in Frankfurt on 27–29 June 1997.

== Results ==
=== Men ===
Event	Gold	
100 m	Marc Blume	10.46
200 m	Marc Blume	20.97
400 m	Jens Dautzenberg	45.97
800 m	Nico Motchebon	1:47.49
1500 m	Rüdiger Stenzel	3:39.04
5000 m	Dieter Baumann	13:19.08
110 m hurdles	Florian Schwarthoff	13.23
400 m hurdles	Steffen Kolb	50.50
3000 m steeplechase	Mark Ostendarp	8:35.65
Triple jump	Charles Friedek	17.34
Long jump	Thorsten Heide	7.98
High jump	Martin Buß	2.28
Pole vault	Tim Lobinger	5.70
Shot put	Oliver-Sven Buder	20.42
Discus throw	Lars Riedel	69.48
Hammer throw	Heinz Weis	83.04 +
Javelin throw	Boris Henry	88.06
4 × 100 m relay	TV Wattenscheid 01 I Alexander Kosenkow; Marc Blume; Holger Blume; Ernst	39.51
4 × 400 m relay	Bayer 04 Leverkusen I Bittner; Rau; Kluth; Voelkel	3:08.74

=== Women ===
Event	Gold	
100 m	Andrea Philipp	11.33
200 m	Grit Breuer	22.73
400 m	Grit Breuer	51.07
800 m	Linda Kisabaka	2:00.52
1500 m	Sylvia Kühnemund	4:11.21
5000 m	Kristina da Fonseca-Wollheim	15:16.85
100 m hurdles	Mona Steigauf	13.01
400 m hurdles	Silvia Rieger	55.21
Triple jump	Petra Lobinger	14.35 ^{[w]}
Long jump	Susen Tiedtke	6.86
High jump	Heike Balck	1.96
Pole vault	Andrea Müller	4.20
Shot put	Astrid Kumbernuss	20.56
Discus throw	Franka Dietzsch	64.82
Hammer throw	Simone Mathes	61.98
Javelin throw	Tanja Damaske	66.08
4 × 100 m relay	LG Olympia Dortmund I Seidel; Möller; Knoll; Philipp	43.84
4 × 400 m relay	OSC Berlin I Schimmer; Hack; Schönenberger; Hartlieb	3:35.05

- ^{w} : Wind assisted
