= German Athletics Championships =

German Athletics Championships Deutsche Leichtathletik-Meisterschaften
- Current season, competition or edition: 2026 German Athletics Championships
- Sport: Athletics
- Founded: 1898
- Country: Germany
- Official website: www.leichtathletik.de

The German Athletics Championships (German: Deutsche Leichtathletik-Meisterschaften) are the national championships in athletics of Germany, organised annually by the Deutscher Leichtathletik-Verband.

The competition features track and field events. Separate championships are held for non-track events, including the German Cross Country Championships, German Marathon Championships and German Race Walking Championships. The championships for combined track and field events are also held separately.

The German Athletics Championships was established in 1898 during the period of the German Empire and it was among the first major national championships, following on from the English, French, American and Canadian national events which had been established in the previous decade. Women's events were first held at the German national championships in 1920. The men's and women's championships were held at separate locations between 1925 and 1933. The competition has been held annually since its creation, with the exceptions of 1914 (year of the outbreak of World War I) and 1944–1945 (the final years of World War II).

== Editions ==
Edition	Year	Location	Venue	Dates
1.	1898	Hamburg		25 September 1898
2.	1899	Strasburg; Braunschweig; Pforzheim		14 May; 6 August; 24 September
3.	1900	Strasburg; Berlin; Hamburg		15 July; 16 September; 23 September
4.	1901	Berlin; Hamburg		30 June; 22 September
5.	1902	Hannover; Frankfurt; Hamburg		3 August; 17 August; 31 August
6.	1903	Frankfurt; Hannover; Hamburg		23 August; 30 August; 6 September
7.	1904	Magdeburg; München; Hannover; Frankfurt; Berlin		19 June; 10 July; 24 July; 21 August; 4 September
8.	1905	Mülhausen; Leipzig; Hannover		16 July; 23 July; 24 September
9.	1906	Hannover		2 September 1906
10.	1907	Breslau		18 August 1907
11.	1908	Berlin		16 August 1908
12.	1909	Frankfurt		29 August 1909
13.	1910	Frankfurt		28 August 1910
14.	1911	Dresden		20 August 1911
15.	1912	Duisburg		18 August 1912
16.	1913	Breslau		17 August 1913
17.	1915	Berlin		19 September 1915
18.	1916	Leipzig		27 August 1916
19.	1917	Berlin		5 August 1917
20.	1918	Berlin		25 August 1918
21.	1919	Nürnberg		23–24 August 1919
22.	1920	Dresden		14–15 August 1920
23.	1921	Hamburg		20–21 August 1921
24.	1922	Duisburg		18–20 August 1922
25.	1923	Frankfurt		17–19 August 1923
26.	1924	Stettin		9–10 August 1924
27.	1925	Berlin (Männer); Leipzig (Frauen)		8–9 August 1925; 6 September 1925
28.	1926	Leipzig (Männer); Braunschweig (Frauen)		7–8 August 1926; 22 August 1926
29.	1927	Berlin (Männer); Breslau (Frauen)		16–17 July 1927; 6–7 August 1927
30.	1928	Düsseldorf (Männer); Berlin (Frauen)		14–16 July 1928; 14–15 July 1928
31.	1929	Breslau (Männer); Frankfurt (Frauen)		20–22 July 1929; 20–21 July 1929
32.	1930	Berlin (Männer); Lennep (Frauen)		2–3 August 1930
33.	1931	Berlin (Männer); Magdeburg (Frauen)		1–2 August 1931
34.	1932	Hannover (Männer); Berlin (Frauen)		2–3 July 1932
35.	1933	Köln (Männer); Weimar (Frauen)		12–13 August 1933; 19–20 August 1933
36.	1934	Nürnberg		27–29 July 1934
37.	1935	Berlin		3–4 August 1935
38.	1936	Berlin		11–12 July 1936
39.	1937	Berlin	Olympiastadion	24–25 July 1937
40.	1938	Breslau	Jahnkampfbahn	28–30 July 1938
41.	1939	Berlin	Olympiastadion	8–9 July 1939
42.	1940	Berlin		10–11 August 1940
43.	1941	Berlin	Olympiastadion	19–20 July 1941
44.	1942	Berlin	Olympiastadion	25–26 July 1942
45.	1943	Berlin	Olympiastadion	24–25 July 1943
Tradition continued from 1946–90 in the form of a West German Athletics Championships, following division of Germany
91.	1991	Hannover	Niedersachsenstadion	26–28 July 1991
92.	1992	München	Olympiastadion	19–21 June 1992
93.	1993	Duisburg	Wedaustadion	9–11 July 1993
94.	1994	Erfurt	Steigerwaldstadion	1–3 July 1994
95.	1995	Bremen	Weserstadion	30 June – 2 July 1995
96.	1996	Köln	Müngersdorfer Stadion	21–23 June 1996
97.	1997	Frankfurt	Waldstadion	27–29 June 1997
98.	1998	Berlin	Jahnstadion	3–5 July 1998
99.	1999	Erfurt	Steigerwaldstadion	2–4 July 1999
100.	2000	Braunschweig	Eintracht-Stadion	29–30 July 2000
101.	2001	Stuttgart	Gottlieb-Daimler-Stadion	29 June – 1 July 2001
102.	2002	Bochum-Wattenscheid	Lohrheidestadion	5–7 July 2002
103.	2003	Ulm	Donaustadion	28–29 July 2003
104.	2004	Braunschweig	Eintracht-Stadion	10–11 July 2004
105.	2005	Bochum-Wattenscheid	Lohrheidestadion	2–3 July 2005
106.	2006	Ulm	Donaustadion	15–16 July 2006
107.	2007	Erfurt	Steigerwaldstadion	21–22 July 2007
108.	2008	Nürnberg	Easycredit-Stadion	5–6 July 2008
109.	2009	Ulm	Donaustadion	4–5 July 2009
110.	2010	Braunschweig	Eintracht-Stadion	17–18 July 2010
111.	2011	Kassel	Auestadion	23–24 July 2011
112.	2012	Bochum-Wattenscheid	Lohrheidestadion	16–17 June 2012
113.	2013	Ulm	Donaustadion	6–7 July 2013
114.	2014	Ulm	Donaustadion	26–27 July 2014
115.	2015	Nürnberg	Grundig Stadion	25–26 July 2015
116.	2016	Kassel	Auestadion	18–19 June 2016
117.	2017	Erfurt	Steigerwaldstadion	8–9 July 2017
118.	2018	Nürnberg	Stadion Nürnberg	21–22 July 2018
119.	2019	Berlin	Olympiastadion	3–4 August 2019
120.	2020	Braunschweig	Eintracht-Stadion	8–9 August 2020
121.	2021	Braunschweig	Eintracht-Stadion	5–6 June 2021
122.	2022	Berlin	Olympiastadion	23–26 June 2022
123.	2023	Kassel	Auestadion	8–9 July 2023
124.	2024	Braunschweig	Eintracht-Stadion	28–30 June 2024
125.	2025	Dresden	Heinz-Steyer-Stadion	31 July–3 August 2025
126.	2026	Wattenscheid	Lohrheidestadion	24–26 July 2026

== Championship records ==
=== Men ===
Event	Record	Athlete/Team	Date	Championships	Place	Ref.
100 m	9.99 (+0.5 m/s) NR	Owen Ansah	29 June 2024	2024	Braunschweig	
200 m	20.02 (+0.6 m/s) NR	Joshua Hartmann	9 July 2023	2023	Kassel	
400 m	44.70	Karl Honz	1972	1972	Munich	
800 m	1:44.90	Franz-Josef Kemper	7 August 1966	1966	Hanover	
1500 m	3:37.00	Thomas Wessinghage	1977	1977	Hamburg	
5000 m	13:19.08	Dieter Baumann	June 1997	1997	Frankfurt	
110 m hurdles	13.05 (−0.8 m/s) NR	Florian Schwarthoff	2 July 1995	1995	Bremen	
400 m hurdles	48.02	Harald Schmid	1985	1985	Stuttgart	
3000 m steeplechase	8:20.47	Patriz Ilg	1985	1985	Stuttgart	
High jump	2.33 m	Ralf Sonn	1993	1993	Duisburg	
Pole vault	5.94 m	Raphael Holzdeppe	26 July 2015	2015	Nuremberg	
Long jump	8.49 m (+1.6 m/s)	Sebastian Bayer	4 July 2009	2009	Ulm	
Triple jump	17.34 m	Charles Friedek	June 1997	1997	Frankfurt	
Shot put	21.87 m	David Storl	25 July 2014	2014	Ulm	
Discus throw	69.48 m	Lars Riedel	June 1997	1997	Frankfurt	
Hammer throw	83.04 m	Heinz Weis	29 June 1997	1997	Frankfurt	
Javelin throw	89.55 m	Andreas Hofmann	22 July 2018	2018	Nuremberg	
10,000 m walk	38:51.51	Andreas Erm	10 July 2004	2004	Braunschweig	
4 × 100 m relay	38.95	LAC Quelle Fürth	1983	1983	Bremen	
4 × 400 m relay	3:03.04	LAC Chemnitz	2 July 1995	1995	Bremen	

=== Women ===
Event	Record	Athlete/Team	Date	Championships	Place	Ref.	Video
100 m	10.91	Katrin Krabbe	1991	Hanover			
200 m	22.12	Katrin Krabbe	1991	1991	Hanover		
400 m	49.78	Grit Breuer	30 June 2001	2001	Stuttgart		
800 m	1:58.45	Hildegard Falck	1971	1971	Stuttgart		
1500 m	3:59.58	Konstanze Klosterhalfen	9 July 2017	2017	Erfurt		
5000 m	14:26.76 NR	Konstanze Klosterhalfen	3 August 2019	2019 Berlin			
100 m hurdles	12.69 (−0.7 m/s)	Pamela Dutkiewicz	22 July 2018	2018 Nuremberg			
400 m hurdles	54.34	Eileen Demes	3 August 2025	2025	Dresden		
3000 m steeplechase	9:25.81	Gesa Felicitas Krause	8 July 2017	2017 Erfurt			
High jump	2.03 m	Heike Henkel	1992	Munich			
Pole vault	4.77 m	Annika Becker	7 July 2002	2002 Wattenscheid			
Long jump	7.21 m	Heike Drechsler	1992	Munich			
Triple jump	14.46 m (+1.0 m/s)	Helga Radtke	3 July 1994	Erfurt			
Shot put	20.92 m	Claudia Losch	1986	Berlin			
Discus throw	68.78 m	Ilke Wyludda	1991	1991	Hanover		
Hammer throw	76.04 m	Betty Heidler	23 July 2011	2011	Kassel		
Javelin throw	68.86 m	Christina Obergföll	24 July 2011	2011	Kassel		
5000 m walk	20:11.45 NR	Sabine Zimmer	2 July 2005	2005	Wattenscheid		
4 × 100 m relay	42.99	LG Olympia Dortmund	30 June 2001	2001	Stuttgart		
4 × 400 m relay	3:29.74	SC Magdeburg	July 1999	1999	Erfurt		

== See also ==
- German records in athletics
