= 2014 German Athletics Championships =

- Dates: 26–27 July 2014
- Host city: Ulm, Germany
- Venue: Donaustadion
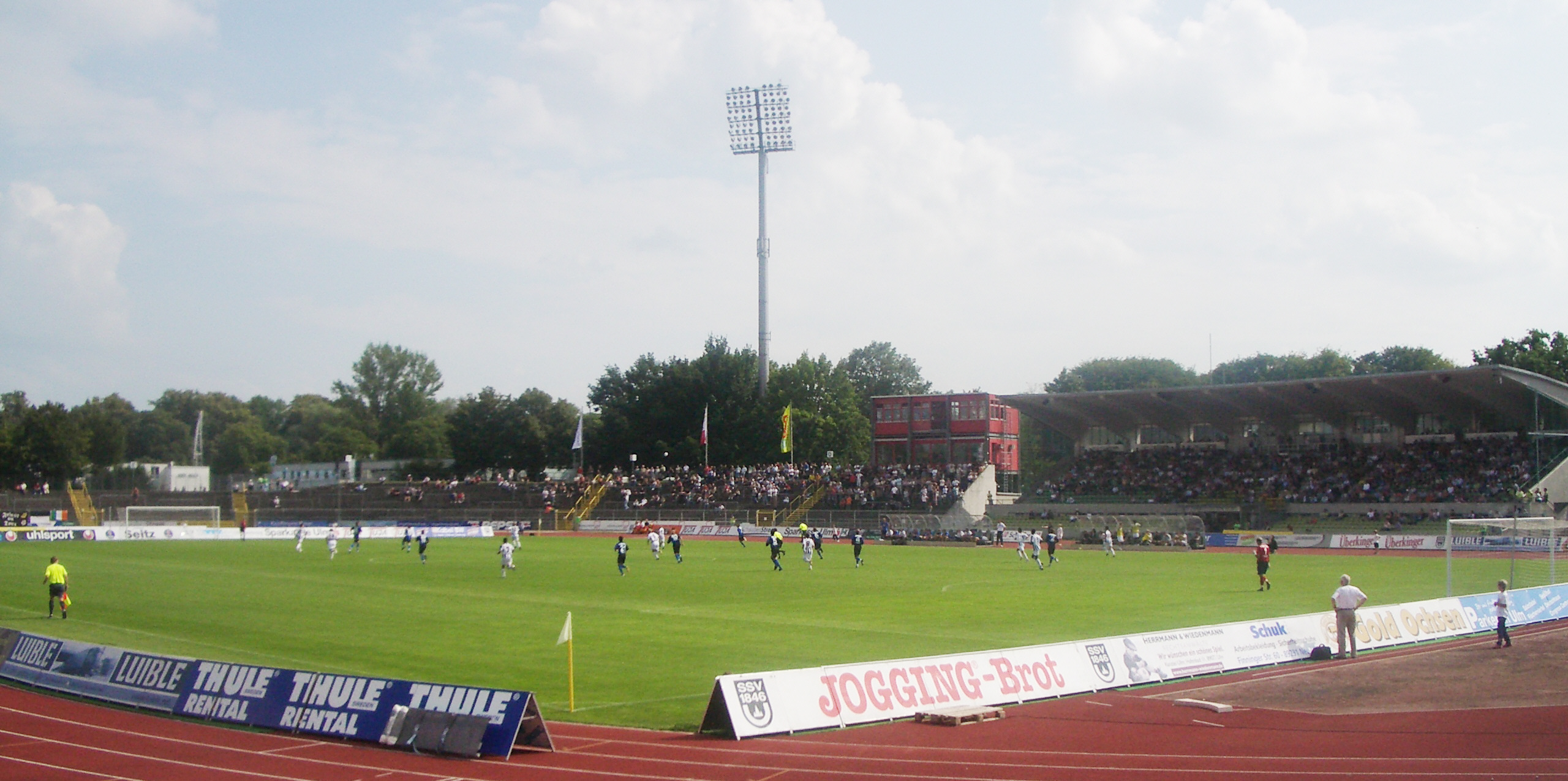

The 2014 German Athletics Championships were held at the Donaustadion in Ulm on 26–27 July 2014.

== Results ==
=== Men ===
	Gold		Silver		Bronze	
100 m (+2.2 m/s)	Julian Reus	10.01	Lucas Jakubczyk	10.01	Aleixo Platini Menga	10.20
200 m (+0.3 m/s)	Robin Erewa	20.61	Sebastian Ernst	20.67	Alexander Kosenkow	20.83
400 m	Kamghe Gaba	45.82	Thomas Schneider	46.08	David Gollnow	46.76
800 m	Dennis Krüger	1:48.91	Denis Bäuerle	1:49.28	Jan Riedel	1:49.30
1500 m	Timo Benitz	3:57.53	Homiyu Tesfaye	3:57.81	Carsten Schlangen	3:57.98
5000 m	Richard Ringer	13:43.45	Arne Gabius	13:44.21	Philipp Pflieger	13:54.45
110 m hurdles (+3.4 m/s)	Matthias Bühler	13.20	Gregor Traber	13.23	Helge Schwarzer	13.59
400 m hurdles	Felix Franz	49.34	Varg Königsmark	49.40	Tobias Giehl	50.23
3000 m steeplechase	Steffen Uliczka	8:35.82	Martin Grau	8:42.13	Hannes Liebach	8:50.36
High jump	Martin Günther	2.25	David Nopper	2.21	Christian Heinze	2.13
Pole vault	Tobias Scherbarth	5.60	Marvin Caspari	5.40	Daniel Clemens	5.30
Triple jump	Manuel Ziegler	16.54	Martin Jasper	16.37	Martin Seiler	16.32 ^{w}
Long jump	Markus Rehm (Note: Rehm is a leg amputee athlete)	8.24	Christian Reif	8.20	Julian Howard	7.90
Shot put	David Storl	21.87	Christian Jagusch	19.73	Tobias Dahm	19.62
Discus throw	Robert Harting	66.67	Martin Wierig	64.94	Daniel Jasinski	63.66
Hammer throw	Markus Esser	75.18	Alexander Ziegler	75.15	Sven Möhsner	71.54
Javelin throw	Thomas Röhler	84.28	Julian Weber	80.72	Andreas Hofmann	79.35
4 × 100 m relay	TV Wattenscheid 01 Christian Blum; Sebastian Ernst; Alexander Kosenkow; Julian Reus	39.02	MTG Mannheim Jonas Kriesamer; Patrick Domogala; Dennis Herdt; Yannick Hoecker	39.98	SCC Berlin George Petzold; Lucas Jakubczyk; Oliver Pritzlaff; Nico Marcel Leistner	40.52
4 × 400 m relay	LG Stadtwerke München I David Gollnow; Kamghe Gaba; Johannes Trefz; Jonas Plass	3:08.05	LG UnterlüßFaßbergOldendorf Lenn Jelte Mügge; Laurin Forstreuter; Alexander Juretzko; Jannik Rehbein	3:10.02	TSV Bayer 04 Leverkusen Lars Heinke; Tobias Lange; Robin Schembera; Hendrik Essers	3:12.02

=== Women ===
	Gold		Silver		Bronze	
100 m (0.0 m/s)	Tatjana Pinto	11.20	Verena Sailer	11.23	Rebekka Haase	11.43
200 m (−0.1 m/s)	Rebekka Haase	23.24	Nadine Gonska	23.27	Inna Weit	23.55
400 m	Esther Cremer	52.56	Ruth Sophia Spelmeyer	52.95	Lena Schmidt	53.24
800 m	Christina Hering	2:01.45	Carolin Walter	2:03.11	Thea Heim	2:03.50
1500 m	Maren Kock	4:20.85	Diana Sujew	4:22.38	Denise Krebs	4:23.35
5000 m	Sabrina Mockenhaupt	15:49.63	Isabell-Sophie Tegen	16:21.91	Elena Burkard	16:28.89
100 m hurdles (+2.0 m/s)	Nadine Hildebrand	12.71 =	Cindy Roleder	12.80	Franziska Hofmann	12.87
400 m hurdles	Christiane Klopsch	56.13	Claudia Wehrsen	57.20	Christine Salterberg	57.55
3000 m steeplechase	Antje Möldner-Schmidt	9:39.09	Gesa Felicitas Krause	9:39.16	Jana Sussmann	9:47.70
High jump	Marie-Laurence Jungfleisch	1.90	Alexandra Plaza	1.87	Katarina Mögenburg	1.84 =
Pole vault	Lisa Ryzih	4.50	Carolin Hingst	4.40	Martina Schultze	4.30
Triple jump	Kristin Gierisch	14.34 ^{w}	Jenny Elbe	14.03	Neele Eckhardt	13.98
Long jump	Melanie Bauschke	6.66	Sosthene Moguenara	6.66	Malaika Mihambo	6.60
Shot put	Christina Schwanitz	19.69	Lena Urbaniak	17.84	Shanice Craft	17.75
Discus throw	Shanice Craft	65.88	Julia Fischer	63.02	Anna Rüh	62.94
Hammer throw	Kathrin Klaas	72.08	Betty Heidler	69.83	Carolin Paesler	67.78
Javelin throw	Linda Stahl	63.55	Katharina Molitor	63.40	Christin Hussong	60.45
4 × 100 m relay	MTG Mannheim Lisa Münzer; Carina Frey; Nadine Gonska; Verena Sailer	43.90	LT DSHS Köln I Tanja Heitgen; Leena Günther; Friederike Möhlenkamp; Linda Krevert	44.92	VfL Sindelfingen Sabrina Lindenmayer; Ida Mayer; Tamara Seer; Eva Baur	45.13 =
4 × 400 m relay	TSV Bayer 04 Leverkusen I Frederike Hogrebe; Julia Förster; Claudia Wehrsen; Carolin Walter	3:35.54	TV Wattenscheid 01 Maral Feizbakhsh; Christina Zwirner; Meike Schachtschneider; Esther Cremer	3:36.30	LT DSHS Köln I Kim Carina Schmidt; Lara Hoffmann; Katrin Schmidt; Lena Schmidt	3:38.23
