= 1995 German Athletics Championships =

- Dates: 30 June – 2 July 1995
- Host city: Bremen, Germany
- Venue: Weserstadion
- Records set: 1 National Record, 3 Championship Records

The 1995 German Athletics Championships were held at the Weserstadion in Bremen on 30 June – 2 July 1995.

== Results ==
=== Men ===
Event	Gold	
100 m	Marc Blume	10.30
200 m	Marc Blume	20.47
400 m	Uwe Jahn	45.95
800 m	Nico Motchebon	1:45.78
1500 m	Dieter Baumann	3:40.02
5000 m	Dieter Baumann	13:26.54
110 m hurdles (−0.8 m/s)	Florian Schwarthoff	13.05
400 m hurdles	Olaf Hense	49.87
3000 m steeplechase	Martin Strege	8:27.68
Triple jump	Jens Schweitzer	16.75 ^{[w]}
Long jump	Georg Ackermann	8.05
High jump	Wolf-Hendrik Beyer	2.30
Pole vault	Andrei Tivontchik	5.70
Shot put	Oliver-Sven Buder	20.45
Discus throw	Lars Riedel	66.34
Hammer throw	Claus Dethloff	76.78
Javelin throw	Boris Henry	88.46
4 × 100 m relay	TV Wattenscheid 01 I Holger Blume; Robert Kurnicki; Michael Huke; Marc Blume	39.37
4 × 400 m relay	LAC Chemnitz I Jens Carlowitz; Uwe Jahn; Thomas Schönlebe; Rico Lieder	3:03.04

=== Women ===
Event	Gold	
100 m (+0.6 m/s)	Melanie Paschke	11.04
200 m	Melanie Paschke	22.53
400 m	Silke-Beate Knoll	50.85
800 m	Anne Bruns	2:04.24
1500 m	Ellen Buchleitner	4:16.07
5000 m	Uta Pippig	15:27.32
100 m hurdles	Caren Jung	13.01
400 m hurdles	Heike Meißner	54.90
Triple jump	Ramona Molzan	13.70
Long jump	Heike Drechsler	6.94
High jump	Alina Astafei	1.98
Pole vault	Christine Adams	4.00
Shot put	Astrid Kumbernuss	20.77
Discus throw	Ilke Wyludda	65.00
Hammer throw	Inga Beyer	60.12
Javelin throw	Tanja Damaske	65.94
4 × 100 m relay	LG Olympia Dortmund I Heike Lüningschröer; Martina Kersting; Katja Seidel; Silke-Beate Knoll	44.88
4 × 400 m relay	LG Olympia Dortmund I Imke Köhler; Silvia Steimle; Sandra Kuschmann; Silke-Beate Knoll	3:31.25

- ^{w} : Wind assisted
