= Jörg Haas =

German middle-distance runner

Personal information
- Nationality: German
- Born: 27 February 1968 (age 58) Offenburg, West Germany

Sport
- Sport: Middle-distance running
- Event: 800 metres

Jörg Haas (born 27 February 1968) is a German middle-distance runner. He competed in the men's 800 metres at the 1992 Summer Olympics. He was the 1992 800 metres national champion at the German Athletics Championships.
