= Ralph Pfersich =

German sprinter

Personal information
- Nationality: German
- Born: 18 April 1966 (age 60) Treuchtlingen, West Germany

Sport
- Sport: Sprinting
- Event: 4 × 400 metres relay

Ralph Pfersich (born 18 April 1966) is a German former sprinter. He competed in the men's 4 × 400 metres relay at the 1992 Summer Olympics.
