= Nicole Leistenschneider =

German sprinter

Personal information
- Nationality: German
- Born: 10 May 1967 (age 59) Toronto, Ontario, Canada

Sport
- Sport: Sprinting
- Event: 4 × 400 metres relay
Medal record
Women's athletics
Representing West Germany
Summer Olympics
Bronze medal – third place	1984 Los Angeles	4 × 400 m relay

Nicole Leistenschneider (born 10 May 1967) is a German sprinter. She competed in the women's 4 × 400 metres relay at the 1984 Summer Olympics, representing West Germany.

She won a bronze medal by virtue of running in the heats.
