= Claudia Marx =

German sprinter

Medal record

Women's athletics

World Championships
Silver medal – second place	2001 Edmonton	4 × 400 m relay

Claudia Marx (born 16 September 1978 in East Berlin) is a German athlete. She runs in the 400 metres and the 400 metres hurdles (which she started in 2005). She also competes in the German team in the 4 × 400 metres relay. She won the 400 metres at the German Athletics Championships in 2003 and 2004 and in the National Indoor Championships in 2005. She is 1.72 metres tall and weighs 59 kg. She currently studies sport sciences at the Humboldt University of Berlin. she came 4th in 400 m hurdles.

== Best performances ==
2006

- 2006 European Athletics Championships (Gothenburg)

(400 m Hurdles), 4th place (54.99)

2005

- 10th IAAF World Championships in Athletics (Helsinki)

(400 m Hurdles), Semi Final, 5th Place (55.64)

- SPAR European Cup (Firenze)

(400 m Hurdles), Bronze Medal (55.73)

2002

- 27th European Indoor Championships (Vienna)

(400 m), Silver Medal (52.15)

2001

- 8th IAAF World Championships in Athletics (Edmonton, Canada)

(4 × 400 m Relay), Silver Medal (With Florence Ekpo-Umoh, Shanta Ghosh and Grit Breuer) (3:21.97).

1997

- World Junior Championship

(4 × 400 m Relay), Bronze Medal

== Personal bests ==
- 400 metres: 51.41 seconds at Stuttgart on 30 June 2001.
- 400 metres hurdles: 54.80 seconds at Gothenburg on 9 August 2006.
