= Claudia Lokar =

German long-distance runner (born 1964)

Claudia Margareta Lokar (née Borgschulze; born 9 February 1964) is a retired (West) German long-distance runner.

In the 3000 metres she finished seventh at the 1988 European Indoor Championships, and twelfth at the 1993 World Championships. She finished ninth in the 10,000 metres at the 1994 European Championships and competed in 5000 metres at the 1996 Olympic Games without reaching the final.

Lokar became German 3000 metres champion in 1992 and 1993 as well as cross-country running champion in 1992, 1994, 1995 and 1996 (long race). She also took national medals in several other events. She represented the clubs TuS 09 Erkenschwick, SC Eintracht Hamm and LG Olympia Dortmund.

Her personal best times were 8:43.11 minutes in the 3000 metres, achieved in September 1995 in Monte Carlo; 15:07.62 minutes in the 5000 metres, achieved in September 1995 in Berlin; 31:57.90 minutes in the 10,000 metres, achieved in August 1995 in Minden; 1:10:09 hours in the half marathon, achieved in April 1996 in Paderborn; and 2:28:17 hours in the marathon, achieved in September 1996 in Berlin.
