= Berliner Sport-Club =

German football club

Berliner SC
- Full name: Berliner Sport-Club e.V.
- Founded: 1895; 131 years ago
- Ground: Hubertus-Sportplatz
- Chairman: Martin Maslowski
- Manager: Ekrem Asma
- League: Berlin-Liga (VI)
- 2015–16: 13th
Home colours	Away colours

Berliner Sport-Club, commonly known as Berliner SC, is a German association football club based in Berlin. The team is part of a sports club which also has departments for badminton, hockey, and rugby union.

== History ==
Berliner SC was created out of the merger of Amateur-Sport-Club 1895 and Sport-Club Berlin founded by Carl Diem in 1896. The club was known as Sport-Club 1895/1896 Berlin until chairman Diem had its name simplified to the current form in 1905.

In its earliest years Berliner SC was primarily an athletics club, though already from 1909 the football team successfully competed for the Berlin championship of the Verband Berliner Athletik-Vereine association and in 1911 joined the Brandenburg football championship. By 1914 the club had over 2000 members and had added departments for hockey and boxing, as well as a section to accommodate American expatriates.

This growth continued through the 1920s when the BFC Hertha 92 football team joined Berliner SC in 1923 to help fend off its own financial difficulties. The football department was then called Hertha BSC, from 1926 to 1931 it reached the German championship finals, winning the title in 1930 and 1931. In 1930 Hertha again split off Berliner SC and after paying a compensation retained the Stadion am Gesundbrunnen venue as well as the BSC name affix. A handball department was formed in 1925, a rugby department in 1934. It was also during this period that a sports medicine committee was formed within the club which helped lead to the creation of a national sports medicine federation under first president and Berliner SC club member Werner Ruhemann.

Lilli Henoch joined the Berliner SC athletics department after World War I. In the 1920s she set world records in the discus (twice), shot put, and 4 × 100 meters relay events, and won German national championships in shot put four times, 4 × 100 meters relay three times, discus twice, and long jump. She was Jewish, and after Adolf Hitler came to power in 1933, she and all other Jews were forced to leave the BSC, in accordance with the Nuremberg Laws.

In the aftermath of World War II Allied occupation authorities ordered the dissolution of all organizations in Germany, including sports and football clubs. When the formation of new associations was permitted again in late 1945 the formed membership of Berliner SC re-grouped as Sportgruppe Eichkamp.

The club played two seasons in the Verbandsliga Berlin as a lower table side. In 2008 the club was relegated to the Landesliga Berlin but now plays in the Berlin-Liga again.

== Honours ==
=== Football ===
German championship

- Champions: 1930 (as Hertha BSC)

=== Basketball ===
Basketball Bundesliga

- Runners-up : 1953–54

=== Field hockey ===
German national title: 2

- 1937, 1937–38
