= Steigerwaldstadion =

Multi-purpose stadium in Erfurt, Germany

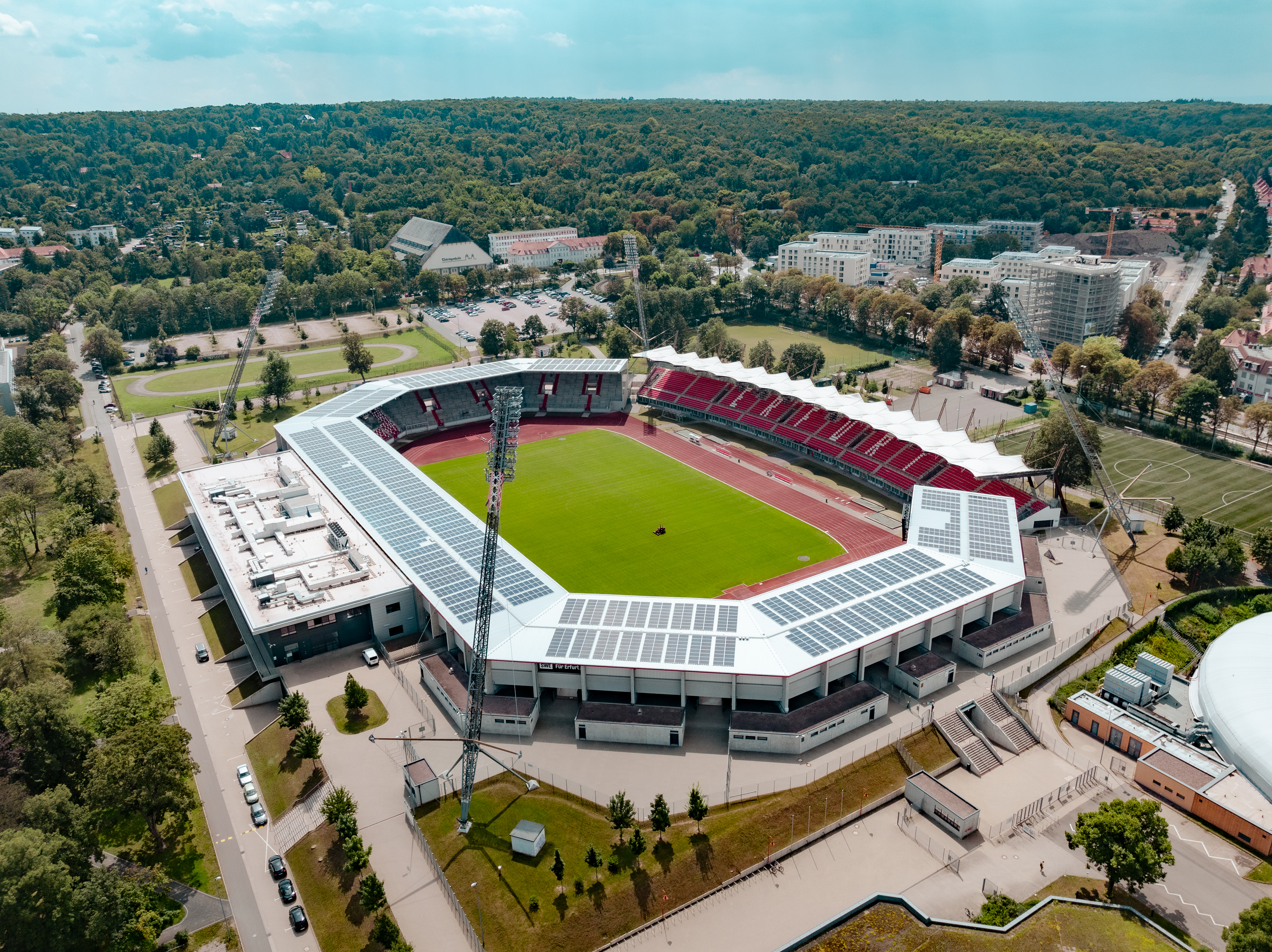
- Interactive map of Steigerwaldstadion
- Former names: Mitteldeutsche Kampfbahn (1931–1948); Georgij-Dimitroff-Stadion (1948–1991); Steigerwaldstadion (1991-)
- Location: Erfurt, Germany
- Coordinates: 50°57′37″N 11°02′14″E
- Capacity: 18,611 (since 2016)
- Surface: Grass

Construction
- Opened: 17 May 1931

Tenant
- FC Rot-Weiß Erfurt

Steigerwaldstadion is a multi-purpose stadium in Erfurt, Germany. The stadium is able to hold 18,611 people and was built in 1931. It is currently used mostly for football matches and is the home stadium of FC Rot-Weiß Erfurt.

From 1948 to 1991 (the time of the German Democratic Republic), Steigerwaldstadion was known as the Georgij-Dimitroff-Stadion, after Bulgarian communist leader Georgi Dimitrov (1882–1949).

Bon Jovi performed at the stadium during their These Days Tour on June 13, 1996 & during their Bounce Tour on May 25, 2003.
