= Claudia Metzner =

German long-distance runner (born 1966)

Claudia Metzner (born 5 May 1966) is a retired German long-distance runner.

She finished lowly at the 1990 World Cross Country Championships, did not finish the marathon race at the 1993 World Championships and finished fourteenth in the 10,000 metres at the 1994 European Championships

Lokar became German 3000 metres champion in 1990 as well as cross-country running champion in 1992 and 1993 (short race). She also took national medals in other events. She represented the clubs LG Olympia Dortmund, BV Teutonia Lanstrop, LG Sauerland and TV Wattenscheid.

Her personal best times were 32:29.86 minutes in the 10,000 metres, achieved in June 1994 in Saint-Denis; 1:11:19 hours in the half marathon, achieved in July 1993 in Roermond; and 2:33:20 hours in the marathon, achieved at the 1992 Frankfurt Marathon.
