= Schahriar Bigdeli =

German long jumper (born 1980)

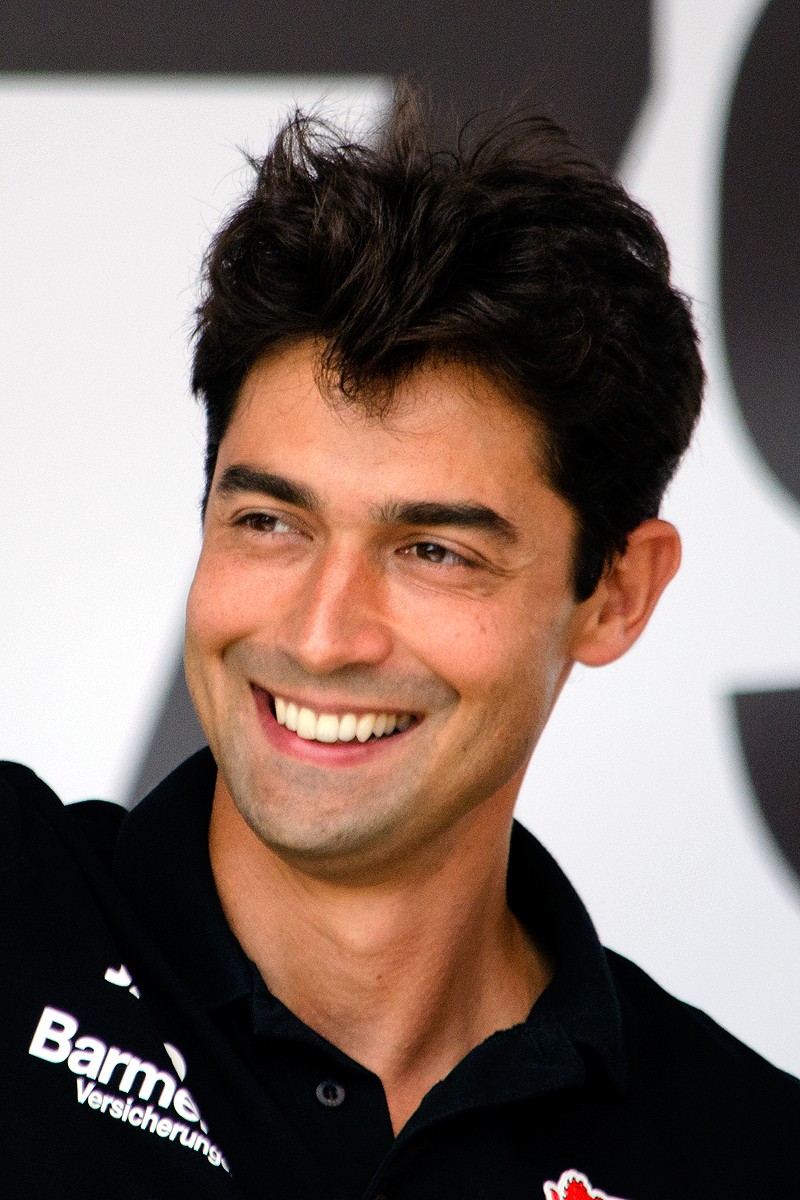
Bigdeli in 2018

Schahriar Bigdeli (born 26 March 1980 in Grevenbroich) is a retired German long jumper.

He finished seventh at the 1998 World Junior Championships. He also competed at the 2002 European Indoor Championships, but did not reach the final round. He became German champion in 2001, 2002 and 2004, representing the sports club TSV Bayer 04 Leverkusen.

His personal best jump was 8.15 metres, achieved on 26 August 2001 in Leverkusen. He has not competed since the 2006 season.
