= Lohrheidestadion =

Football stadium in Bochum, Germany

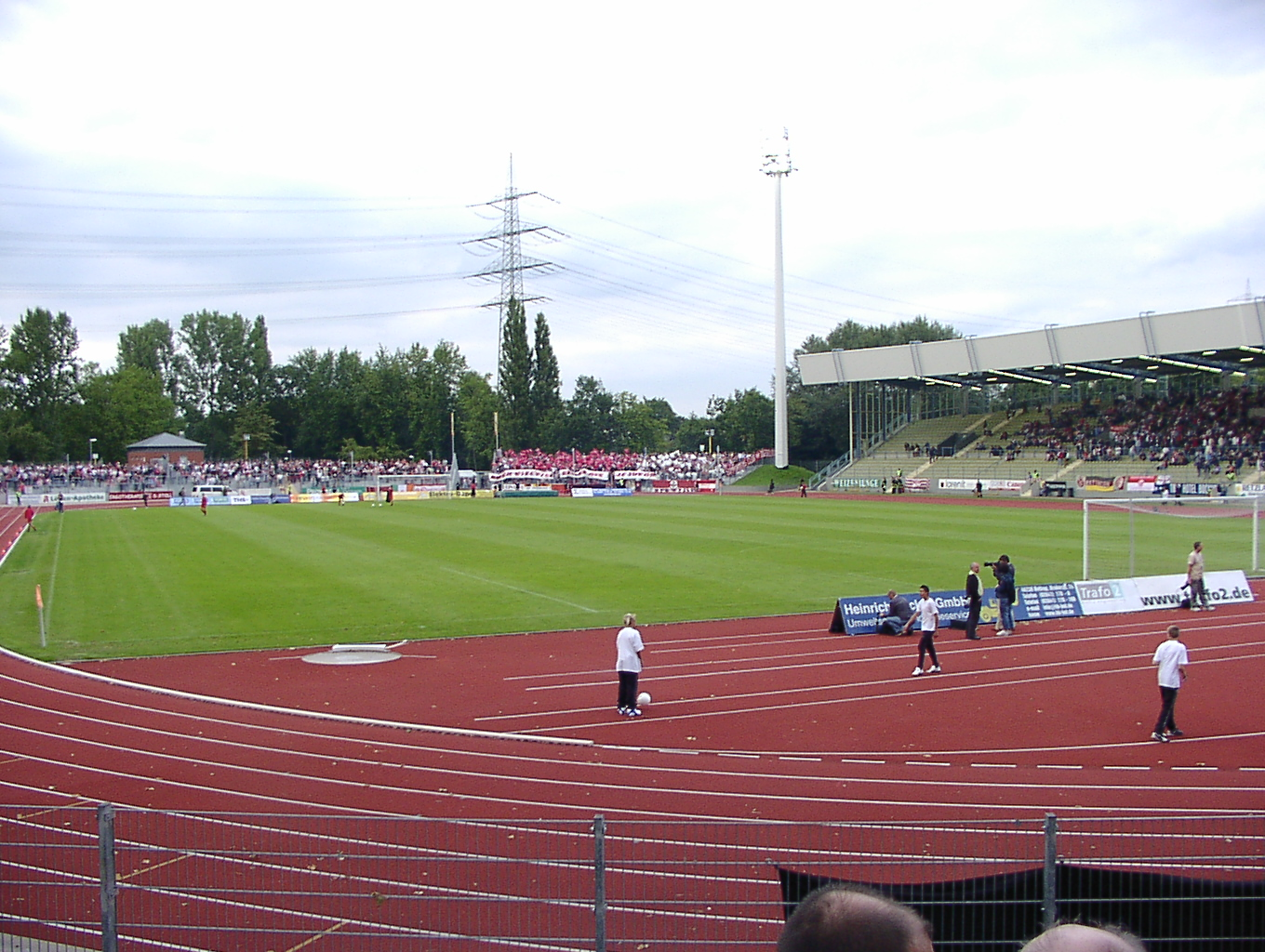
- Interactive map of Lohrheidestadion
- Location: Bochum-Wattenscheid
- Coordinates: 51°29′9″N 7°7′7″E
- Capacity: 16,233

Construction
- Opened: 1954

Tenants
- SG Wattenscheid 09 (1965–present); TV Wattenscheid (1965–present)

The Lohrheidestadion is a multi-use stadium in Bochum-Wattenscheid, Germany. It is currently used mostly for football matches and is the home stadium of SG Wattenscheid 09. The stadium is able to hold 16,233 people and opened in 1954.

It is used for athletics by the local club TV Wattenscheid.
