= Donaustadion =

Multi-purpose stadium in Ulm, Germany

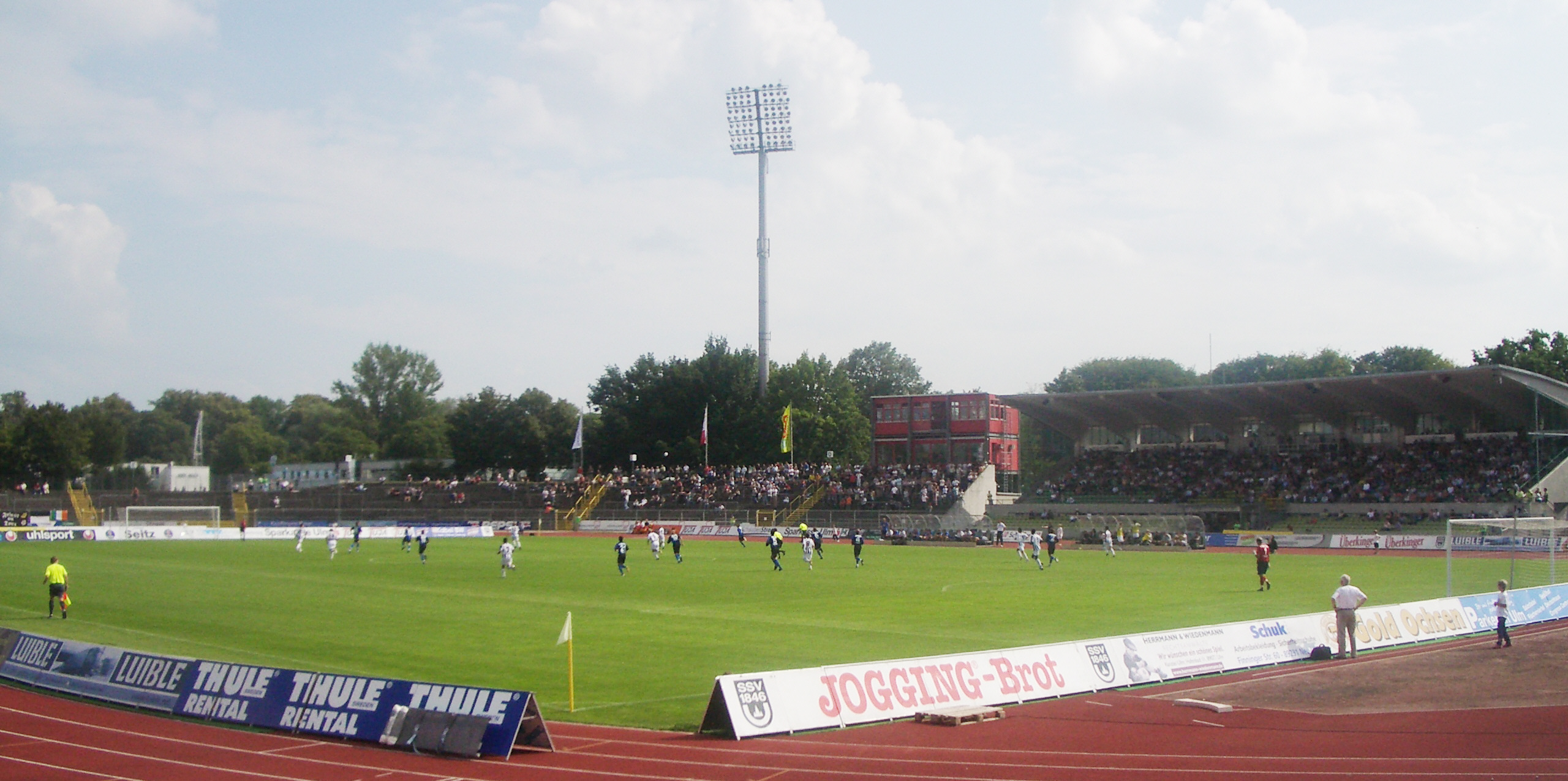
- Interactive map of Donaustadion
- Location: Ulm, Germany
- Coordinates: 48°24′16″N 10°0′35″E
- Owner: City of Ulm
- Capacity: 17,400

Construction
- Opened: 1925
- Renovated: 1952, 1999

Tenant
- SSV Ulm 1846

The Donaustadion (English: Danube Stadium) is a multi-purpose stadium in Ulm, Germany. It is currently used mostly for football matches and is the home stadium of SSV Ulm 1846. The stadium is able to hold 17,400 people.

In 1999, a new stand was constructed, filling the last open gap of the former horseshoe shaped ground. This all-seated affair was the first non-smoking stand within a professional football ground in Germany.

== See also ==
- List of football stadiums in Germany
- Lists of stadiums

Preceded by Ullevaal Stadion; Oslo	UEFA Women's Euro; Final Venue; 2001	Succeeded by Ewood Park; Blackburn
