= René Herms =

German middle-distance runner

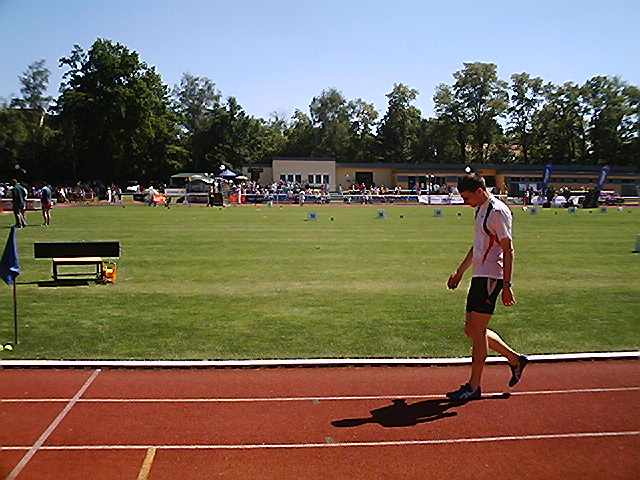
René Herms in 2006

René Herms (17 July 1982 – 9 January 2009) was a German middle-distance runner who specialised in the 800 metres.

Herms was born in Dohna, Bezirk Dresden, East Germany. He won the silver medal in 4 × 400 metres relay at the 2000 World Junior Championships, became European junior champion in 2001 and finished seventh at the 2002 European Championships. He also competed at the World Championships in 2003 and 2005 as well as the 2004 Olympic Games without reaching the finals.

His personal best time was 1:44.14 minutes, achieved in August 2004 in Munich.

He competed for the athletics clubs LSV Pirna and LG Braunschweig.

He died in Lohmen, Germany, aged 26. The reported cause of the death was a heart-related illness.
