= Holger Blume =

German sprinter (born 1973)

Holger Blume (born 28 December 1973 in Lüdinghausen, North Rhine-Westphalia, West Germany) is a former German sprinter who specialised in the 100 metres.

He is the twin brother of Marc Blume. Both represented the sports club TV Wattenscheid.

Holger Blume finished seventh in 4 × 100 metres relay at the 1998 IAAF World Cup, with teammates Patrick Schneider, Manuel Milde and Marc Blume. With a personal best of 10.13 seconds, Blume is fifth on the German all-time list.

He also participated in this event at the 1996 Olympic Games, the 1999 World Championships and the 2002 IAAF World Cup without reaching the final.

== Personal bests ==
- 100 m: 10.25 s (1999)
- 200 m: 20.73 s (1999)
