= Grit Breuer =

German sprinter (born 1972)

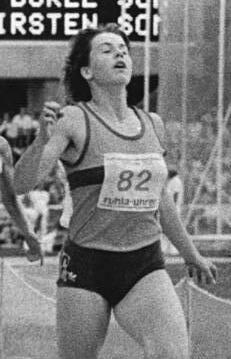
- Breuer at the East German Track and Field Athletics Championships in Neubrandenburg, July 1989

Medal record

Women's athletics

Representing East Germany

Olympic Games
Bronze medal – third place	1988 Seoul	4 × 400 m relay

European Championships
Gold medal – first place	1990 Split	400 metres
Gold medal – first place	1990 Split	400 × 400 metres relay

Representing Germany

Olympic Games
Bronze medal – third place	1996 Atlanta	4 × 400 m relay

World Championships
Gold medal – first place	1997 Athens	4 × 400 m relay
Silver medal – second place	1991 Tokyo	400 m
Silver medal – second place	2001 Edmonton	4 × 400 m relay
Bronze medal – third place	1991 Tokyo	4 × 100 m relay
Bronze medal – third place	1991 Tokyo	4 × 400 m relay
Bronze medal – third place	1999 Seville	4 × 400 m relay

European Championships
Gold medal – first place	1998 Budapest	400 metres
Gold medal – first place	1998 Budapest	400 × 400 m relay
Gold medal – first place	2002 Munich	400 × 400m relay
Silver medal – second place	2002 Munich	400 metres

World Indoor Championships
Gold medal – first place	1991 Seville	4 × 400 m relay
Gold medal – first place	1999 Maebashi	400 m
Bronze medal – third place	1991 Seville	200 m
Bronze medal – third place	1997 Paris	4 × 400 m relay
Bronze medal – third place	2003 Birmingham	400 m

Grit Breuer (later Springstein; born 16 February 1972 in Röbel, Bezirk Neubrandenburg) is a German former athlete, who competed in the women's 200 metres, 400 metres, 4 × 100 m relay, and 4 × 400 m relay events.

She has received injuries as a result of her sports competition, including a slipped disk in her back and a ligament in her knee. She has also been involved in drugs-related controversy. In 1992 she received a two-year ban from the sport after admitting she had taken clenbuterol. In 2004, she was accused of skipping a drug test in South Africa, but she was cleared on a technicality. She has won two Olympic bronze medals in the 4 × 400 metres relay. Her first was in 1988 competing for East Germany, when she ran in the heats but not the final and the second was in 1996.

== Sports accomplishments ==
Year	Competition	Venue	Position	Event	Notes
Representing East Germany
1988	World Junior Championships	Sudbury, Canada	1st	400 m	51.24
1988	World Junior Championships	Sudbury, Canada	1st	4 × 100 m relay	43.48
1988	World Junior Championships	Sudbury, Canada	1st	4 × 400 m relay	3:28.39
1988	Olympic Games	Seoul	3rd	4 × 400 m relay	N/A (Note: She ran the heats, but not the finals)
1989	World Cup	Barcelona, Spain	2nd	400 m	50.67
1989	World Cup	Barcelona, Spain	2nd	4 × 400 m relay	3:23.97
1990	European Championships	Split, Yugoslavia	1st	400 m	49.50
1990	European Championships	Split, Yugoslavia	1st	4 × 400 m relay	3:21.02
Representing Germany
1991	World Indoor Championships	Seville, Spain	3rd	200 m	22.58
1991	World Indoor Championships	Seville, Spain	1st	4 × 400 m relay	3:27.22
1991	World Championships	Tokyo, Japan	2nd	400 m	49.42
1991	World Championships	Tokyo, Japan	3rd	4 × 100 m relay	42.33
1991	World Championships	Tokyo, Japan	3rd	4 × 400 m relay	3:21.25
1996	European Indoor Championships	Stockholm, Sweden	1st	400 m	50.89
1996	Olympic Games	Atlanta, United States	8th	400 m	50.71
1996	Olympic Games	Atlanta, United States	3rd	4 × 400 m relay	3:21.14
1997	World Indoor Championships	Paris, France	3rd	4 × 400 m relay	3:28.39
1997	World Championships	Athens, Greece	1st	4 × 400 m relay	3:20.92
1998	European Indoor Championships	Valencia, Spain	1st	400 m	50.45
1998	European Championships	Budapest, Hungary	1st	400 m	49.93
1998	World Cup	Johannesburg, South Africa	2nd	400 m	49.86
1998	World Cup	Johannesburg, South Africa	1st	4 × 400 m relay	3:24.26
1999	World Indoor Championships	Maebashi, Japan	1st	400 m	50.80
1999	World Championships	Seville, Spain	3rd	4 × 400 m relay	3:22.43
2004	Summer Olympics	Athens, Greece	heats	4 × 400 m relay	3:27.75

== See also ==
- Doping cases in athletics
