= 2005 European Cup Super League =

These are the full results of the 2005 European Cup Super League which was held on 17, 18, and 19 June 2005 at the Stadio Luigi Ridolfi in Florence, Italy.

== Final standings ==
Men
Pos.	Nation	Points
1st place, gold medalist(s)	Germany	113
2nd place, silver medalist(s)	France	104
3rd place, bronze medalist(s)	Italy	98
4	Poland	94.5
5	Russia	88
6	Spain	86.5
7	Great Britain	70
8	Czech Republic	63

Women
Pos.	Nation	Points
1st place, gold medalist(s)	Russia	131.5
2nd place, silver medalist(s)	Poland	94
3rd place, bronze medalist(s)	Germany	93
4	France	90.5
5	Ukraine	86
6	Romania	85
7	Italy	77
8	Greece	62

== Men's results ==
=== 100 metres ===
18 June
Wind: +2.1 m/s

Rank	Name	Nationality	Time	Notes	Points
1	Ronald Pognon	France	10.06		8
2	Mark Lewis-Francis	Great Britain	10.10		7
3	Simone Collio	Italy	10.15		6
4	Andrey Yepishin	Russia	10.26		5
5	Łukasz Chyła	Poland	10.31		4
6	Jiří Vojtík	Czech Republic	10.39		3
7	Ángel David Rodríguez	Spain	10.39		2
8	Marc Blume	Germany	10.51		1

=== 200 metres ===
19 June
Wind: -0.6 m/s

Rank	Name	Nationality	Time	Notes	Points
1	Christian Malcolm	Great Britain	20.15	SB	8
2	Tobias Unger	Germany	20.36		7
3	Jiří Vojtík	Czech Republic	20.66	SB	6
4	Koura Kaba Fantoni	Italy	20.75		5
5	Marcin Urbaś	Poland	20.75	SB	4
6	Ivan Teplykh	Russia	21.00	SB	3
7	Idrissa M'Barke	France	21.05		2
8	José María García-Borreguero	Spain	21.31		1

=== 400 metres ===
18 June

Rank	Name	Nationality	Time	Notes	Points
1	Marc Raquil	France	45.80		8
2	Simon Kirch	Germany	45.86		7
3	Andrey Rudnitskiy	Russia	46.06	SB	6
4	Andrea Barberi	Italy	46.09		5
5	Malachi Davis	Great Britain	46.15		4
6	Piotr Klimczak	Poland	46.23		3
7	Karel Bláha	Czech Republic	46.48		2
8	David Testa	Spain	46.81		1

=== 800 metres ===
19 June

Rank	Name	Nationality	Time	Notes	Points
1	Antonio Manuel Reina	Spain	1:46.11		8
2	Grzegorz Krzosek	Poland	1:46.52		7
3	Dmitry Bogdanov	Russia	1:46.79		6
4	René Herms	Germany	1:47.04		5
5	Nicolas Aïssat	France	1:47.31		4
6	Maurizio Bobbato	Italy	1:47.86		3
7	Jimmy Watkins	Great Britain	1:48.50		2
	Jaroslav Růža	Czech Republic	DNF		0

=== 1500 metres ===
18 June

Rank	Name	Nationality	Time	Notes	Points
1	Juan Carlos Higuero	Spain	3:41.72		8
2	Mounir Yemmouni	France	3:42.10		7
3	Paweł Czapiewski	Poland	3:42.19		6
4	Michal Šneberger	Czech Republic	3:42.49		5
5	Franek Haschke	Germany	3:43.04		4
6	Christian Obrist	Italy	3:44.25		3
7	James Thie	Great Britain	3:44.46		2
8	Aleksandr Krivchonkov	Russia	3:44.52		1

=== 3000 metres ===
19 June

Rank	Name	Nationality	Time	Notes	Points
1	Jesús España	Spain	8:16.48		8
2	Mohamed Farah	Great Britain	8:17.28		7
3	Yared Shegumo	Poland	8:18.06		6
4	Arne Gabius	Germany	8:18.07		5
5	Mokhtar Benhari	France	8:19.11		4
6	Simone Zanon	Italy	8:19.19		3
7	Dmitriy Maksimov	Russia	8:26.76	SB	2
8	Václav Janoušek	Czech Republic	8:57.25		1

=== 5000 metres ===
17 June

Rank	Name	Nationality	Time	Notes	Points
1	Juan Carlos de la Ossa	Spain	13:30.97		8
2	Bouabdellah Tahri	France	13:32.34	SB	7
3	Jan Fitschen	Germany	13:33.46		6
4	Sergey Ivanov	Russia	13:43.84	SB	5
5	Jakub Czaja	Poland	13:46.53	PB	4
6	Salvatore Vincenti	Italy	14:00.97		3
7	Chris Davies	Great Britain	14:06.21	SB	2
8	Jan Kreisinger	Czech Republic	14:58.43		1

=== 110 metres hurdles ===
19 June
Wind: +2.0 m/s

Rank	Name	Nationality	Time	Notes	Points
1	Ladji Doucouré	France	13.16		8
2	Thomas Blaschek	Germany	13.44		7
3	Andrea Giaconi	Italy	13.52	SB	6
4	Felipe Vivancos	Spain	13.70		5
5	Artur Kohutek	Poland	13.70	SB	4
6	Stanislav Sajdok	Czech Republic	13.96		3
7	Mikhail Lipsky	Russia	15.62	PB	2
	David Hughes	Great Britain	DNF		0

=== 400 metres hurdles ===
18 June

Rank	Name	Nationality	Time	Notes	Points
1	Naman Keïta	France	48.77		8
2	Marek Plawgo	Poland	48.99		7
3	Gianni Carabelli	Italy	49.04		6
4	Christian Duma	Germany	49.17	PB	5
5	Jiří Mužík	Czech Republic	49.89		4
6	Chris Rawlinson	Great Britain	50.44		3
7	Mikhail Lipsky	Russia	50.52		2
8	Javier Gutiérrez	Spain	52.52		1

=== 3000 metres steeplechase ===
17 June

Rank	Name	Nationality	Time	Notes	Points
1	Antonio David Jiménez	Spain	8:20.17		8
2	Radosław Popławski	Poland	8:20.48		7
3	Vincent Le Dauphin	France	8:22.03		6
4	Filmon Ghirmai	Germany	8:22.37	SB	5
5	Andrey Olshanskiy	Russia	8:30.47		4
6	Stuart Stokes	Great Britain	8:35.93		3
7	Yuri Floriani	Italy	8:40.82	SB	2
8	František Zouhar	Czech Republic	8:44.38	PB	1

=== 4 × 100 metres relay ===
18 June

Rank	Nation	Athletes	Time	Note	Points
1	Great Britain	Jason Gardener, Marlon Devonish, Christian Malcolm, Mark Lewis-Francis	38.67		8
2	Italy	Luca Verdecchia, Simone Collio, Marco Torrieri, Koura Kaba Fantoni	38.69	SB	7
3	France	Lueyi Dovy, Ronald Pognon, Ladji Doucouré, Idrissa M'Barke	38.78		6
4	Germany	Marc Blume, Tobias Unger, Alexander Kosenkow, Marius Broening	39.00		5
5	Poland	Zbigniew Tulin, Łukasz Chyła, Michał Bielczyk, Marcin Urbaś	39.11		4
6	Spain	Cecilio Maestra, Ángel David Rodríguez, José María García-Borreguero, Jordi Mayoral	40.02		3
7	Czech Republic	Tomáš Knebl, Jan Stokláska, Rudolf Götz, Radek Zachoval	40.28		2
	Russia	Andrey Yepishin, Ivan Teplykh, Aleksandr Ryabov, Sergey Bychkov	DNF		0

=== 4 × 400 metres relay ===
19 June

Rank	Nation	Athletes	Time	Note	Points
1	Great Britain	Robert Tobin, Graham Hedman, Malachi Davis, Tim Benjamin	3:00.51		8
2	Poland	Piotr Klimczak, Marcin Marciniszyn, Robert Maćkowiak, Marek Plawgo	3:01.33		7
3	France	Abderahim El Haouzy, Naman Keïta, Richard Maunier, Marc Raquil	3:01.65	SB	6
4	Italy	Claudio Licciardello, Edoardo Vallet, Luca Galletti, Andrea Barberi	3:01.96	SB	5
5	Russia	Oleg Mishukov, Yevgeniy Lebedev, Dmitriy Forshev, Andrey Rudnitskiy	3:02.52		4
6	Germany	Simon Kirch, Florian Seitz, Ralf Riester, Bastian Swillims	3:02.94		3
7	Spain	Santiago Ezquerro, David Testa, Antonio Manuel Reina, David Melo	3:04.24		2
8	Czech Republic	Jiří Mužík, Jiří Vojtík, Rudolf Götz, Karel Bláha	3:05.02	SB	1

=== High jump ===
17 June

Rank	Name	Nationality	2.10	2.15	2.20	2.24	2.27	2.30	2.32	Result	Notes	Points
1	Aleksey Dmitrik	Russia	o	o	xo	o	o	xxo	–	2.30	SB	8
2	Nicola Ciotti	Italy	–	o	o	xo	xxo	xxo	xxx	2.30	=PB	7
3	Svatoslav Ton	Czech Republic	–	o	o	xxo	o	xxx		2.27		6
4	Mickaël Hanany	France	xo	o	o	xxo	xo	xxx		2.27		5
5	Roman Fricke	Germany	o	o	o	o	xxx			2.24		3.5
5	Grzegorz Sposób	Poland	–	o	o	o	xxx			2.24		3.5
7	Ben Challenger	Great Britain	–	o	o	xxx				2.20		2
8	Javier Bermejo	Spain	o	o	xo	xxx				2.20		1

=== Pole vault ===
19 June

Rank	Name	Nationality	5.10	5.20	5.30	5.40	5.50	5.60	5.65	5.70	5.80	5.91	Result	Notes	Points
1	Giuseppe Gibilisco	Italy	–	–	–	xo	–	xo	–	o	xo	xxx	5.80		8
2	Adam Ptáček	Czech Republic	–	o	–	xo	–	o	–	xxx			5.60	=SB	7
3	Yevgeniy Mikhaylichenko	Russia	–	–	o	o	xo	xx–	x				5.50	SB	6
4	Fabian Schulze	Germany	–	–	–	o	–	xxx					5.40		4.5
4	Javier Gazol	Spain	–	o	–	o	xxx						5.40		4.5
6	Adam Kolasa	Poland	–	o	–	o	xxx						5.40		3
7	Jérôme Clavier	France	o	–	o	xxx							5.30		2
8	Nick Buckfield	Great Britain	–	o	–	xxx							5.30		1

=== Long jump ===
18 June

Rank	Name	Nationality	#1	#2	#3	#4	Result	Notes	Points
1	Nils Winter	Germany	7.71	7.64	8.06	x	8.06		8
2	Salim Sdiri	France	x	x	x	8.05w	8.05w		7
3	Vitaliy Shkurlatov	Russia	x	x	7.98	x	7.98		6
4	Nicola Trentin	Italy	7.87	x	x	x	7.87		5
5	Alberto Sanz	Spain	7.83	x	x	7.75	7.83	SB	4
6	Tomasz Mateusiak	Poland	7.68	7.51	7.73	7.53	7.73		3
7	Roman Šebrle	Czech Republic	7.28	7.38	6.97	7.16	7.38		2
8	Nathan Morgan	Great Britain	x	x	x	7.30	7.30		1

=== Triple jump ===
19 June

Rank	Name	Nationality	#1	#2	#3	#4	Result	Notes	Points
1	Charles Friedek	Germany	x	x	16.12	17.20	17.20		8
2	Danila Burkenya	Russia	16.51	x	16.05	17.06	17.06		7
3	Sébastien Pincemail	France	16.83	16.81	x	x	16.83		6
4	Emanuele Sardano	Italy	16.57	x	16.32	16.25	16.57		5
5	Nathan Douglas	Great Britain	x	x	16.54	16.49	16.54		4
6	Tomáš Cholenský	Czech Republic	16.48	14.53	x	x	16.48	PB	3
7	Jacek Kazimierowski	Poland	16.08	x	x	16.13	16.13		2
8	Eduardo Pérez	Spain	15.34	15.65	15.76	x	15.76		1

=== Shot put ===
18 June

Rank	Name	Nationality	#1	#2	#3	#4	Result	Notes	Points
1	Ralf Bartels	Germany	20.76	x	x	x	20.76		8
2	Manuel Martínez	Spain	19.52	20.26	20.28	20.07	20.28		7
3	Petr Stehlík	Czech Republic	19.75	x	x	20.24	20.24		6
4	Tomasz Majewski	Poland	19.72	20.13	19.88	x	20.13		5
5	Carl Myerscough	Great Britain	20.00	20.05	x	x	20.05		4
6	Pavel Sofin	Russia	x	19.52	x	19.77	19.77		3
7	Marco Dodoni	Italy	18.74	19.15	x	x	19.15		2
8	Gaëtan Bucki	France	18.30	18.19	18.64	18.88	18.88		1

=== Discus throw ===
18 June

Rank	Name	Nationality	#1	#2	#3	#4	Result	Notes	Points
1	Mario Pestano	Spain	60.60	64.88	66.29	65.65	66.29		8
2	Michael Möllenbeck	Germany	x	62.28	64.12	62.61	64.12		7
3	Diego Fortuna	Italy	59.97	61.06	59.87	60.70	61.06		6
4	Libor Malina	Czech Republic	61.06	58.86	x	x	61.06		5
5	Bogdan Pishchalnikov	Russia	57.97	59.68	x	x	59.68		4
6	Andrzej Krawczyk	Poland	59.11	59.47	58.77	x	59.47		3
7	Jean-Claude Retel	France	x	54.87	58.41	56.56	58.41		2
8	Emeka Udechuku	Great Britain	55.97	57.38	55.19	55.47	57.38		1

=== Hammer throw ===
17 June

Rank	Name	Nationality	#1	#2	#3	#4	Result	Notes	Points
1	Szymon Ziółkowski	Poland	75.02	76.78	79.14	x	79.14		8
2	Ilya Konovalov	Russia	76.65	76.65	76.78	76.33	76.78		7
3	Markus Esser	Germany	76.11	x	x	x	76.11		6
4	Nicola Vizzoni	Italy	74.33	x	71.92	74.82	74.82		5
5	Lukáš Melich	Czech Republic	x	72.80	x	x	72.80		4
6	Moisés Campeny	Spain	69.87	70.57	x	70.19	70.57		3
7	Nicolas Figère	France	69.04	69.48	x	x	69.48		2
8	Andy Frost	Great Britain	x	x	68.70	67.33	68.70		1

=== Javelin throw ===
19 June

Rank	Name	Nationality	#1	#2	#3	#4	Result	Notes	Points
1	Mark Frank	Germany	76.91	78.62	82.38	78.53	82.38		8
2	Aleksandr Ivanov	Russia	80.63	81.96	x	x	81.96		7
3	Francesco Pignata	Italy	79.59	81.67	80.56	x	81.67		6
4	Vitoli Tipotio	France	76.75	x	x	77.23	77.23		5
5	Igor Janik	Poland	x	74.71	72.58	75.36	75.36		4
6	Gustavo Dacal	Spain	70.67	71.52	x	74.29	74.29		3
7	Nick Nieland	Great Britain	x	73.95	73.97	x	73.97		2
8	Petr Belunek	Czech Republic	72.47	72.68	69.39	x	72.68		1

== Women's results ==
=== 100 metres ===
18 June
Wind: +1.3 m/s

Rank	Name	Nationality	Time	Notes	Points
1	Christine Arron	France	11.09		8
2	Olga Fyodorova	Russia	11.21	PB	7
3	Maria Karastamati	Greece	11.30		6
4	Manuela Levorato	Italy	11.42		5
5	Angela Moroșanu	Romania	11.47	PB	4
6	Iryna Kozhemyakina	Ukraine	11.53		3
7	Esther Möller	Germany	11.57		2
8	Daria Onyśko	Poland	11.64		1

=== 200 metres ===
19 June
Wind: -0.6 m/s

Rank	Name	Nationality	Time	Notes	Points
1	Christine Arron	France	22.84		8
2	Yelena Bolsun	Russia	23.00		7
3	Maryna Maydanova	Ukraine	23.01		6
4	Anna Guzowska	Poland	23.15		5
5	Ionela Târlea-Manolache	Romania	23.26	SB	4
6	Vincenza Calì	Italy	23.38		3
7	Birgit Rockmeier	Germany	23.42		2
8	Marina Vasarmidou	Greece	23.86	SB	1

=== 400 metres ===
18 June

Rank	Name	Nationality	Time	Notes	Points
1	Natalya Antyukh	Russia	50.67	SB	8
2	Antonina Yefremova	Ukraine	51.56		7
3	Dimitra Dova	Greece	51.89	PB	6
4	Ionela Târlea-Manolache	Romania	52.09	SB	5
5	Solen Désert	France	52.13		4
6	Monika Bejnar	Poland	52.31		3
7	Claudia Hoffmann	Germany	52.64		2
8	Daniela Reina	Italy	54.29		1

=== 800 metres ===
18 June

Rank	Name	Nationality	Time	Notes	Points
1	Maria Cioncan	Romania	2:00.88	SB	8
2	Monika Gradzki	Germany	2:01.00	SB	7
3	Svetlana Klyuka	Russia	2:01.02		6
4	Elisabeth Grousselle	France	2:01.45		5
5	Ewelina Sętowska	Poland	2:01.99		4
6	Tamara Tverdostup	Ukraine	2:02.28	SB	3
7	Alexia Oberstolz	Italy	2:02.35	PB	2
8	Eleni Filandra	Greece	2:04.92		1

=== 1500 metres ===
19 June

Rank	Name	Nationality	Time	Notes	Points
1	Yuliya Chizhenko	Russia	4:06.76		8
2	Maria Cioncan	Romania	4:07.39	SB	7
3	Bouchra Ghezielle	France	4:08.02		6
4	Anna Jakubczak	Poland	4:08.84		5
5	Nelya Neporadna	Ukraine	4:12.14		4
6	Kathleen Friedrich	Germany	4:12.71		3
7	Eleonora Berlanda	Italy	4:14.86		2
8	Fotini Daggli-Pagotto	Greece	4:18.99	PB	1

=== 3000 metres ===
18 June

Rank	Name	Nationality	Time	Notes	Points
1	Yelena Zadorozhnaya	Russia	8:57.08		8
2	Maria Martins	France	9:00.71	PB	7
3	Tetyana Kryvobok	Ukraine	9:01.65		6
4	Mihaela Botezan	Romania	9:02.84	SB	5
5	Justyna Lesman	Poland	9:16.02	SB	4
6	Angela Rinicella	Italy	9:22.10	SB	3
7	Kalliopi Astropekaki	Greece	9:32.20	SB	2
8	Susanne Ritter	Germany	10:00.82	SB	1

=== 5000 metres ===
17 June

Rank	Name	Nationality	Time	Notes	Points
1	Liliya Shobukhova	Russia	15:01.15		8
2	Wioletta Janowska	Poland	15:08.38	PB	7
3	Mihaela Botezan	Romania	15:13.36	SB	6
4	Sabrina Mockenhaupt	Germany	15:20.66		5
5	Margaret Maury	France	15:24.99		4
6	Silvia Weissteiner	Italy	15:34.23		3
7	Nataliya Berkut	Ukraine	15:35.84	SB	2
8	Maria Protopappa	Greece	15:36.89		1

=== 100 metres hurdles ===
19 June
Wind: -1.3 m/s

Rank	Name	Nationality	Time	Notes	Points
1	Linda Khodadin	France	12.73		8
2	Kirsten Bolm	Germany	12.79		7
3	Flóra Redoúmi	Greece	13.03	SB	6
4	Aurelia Trywiańska	Poland	13.25		5
5	Micol Cattaneo	Italy	13.34		4
6	Yevheniya Snihur	Ukraine	13.40		3
7	Mariya Koroteyeva	Russia	13.79		2
8	Viorica Țigău	Romania	13.85		1

=== 400 metres hurdles ===
18 June

Rank	Name	Nationality	Time	Notes	Points
1	Anna Jesień	Poland	54.90		8
2	Yekaterina Bikert	Russia	55.73		7
3	Claudia Marx	Germany	55.84		6
4	Monika Niederstätter	Italy	56.38		5
5	Hristina Hantzi-Neag	Greece	56.49		4
6	Sylvanie Morandais	France	57.07		3
7	Oksana Volosyuk	Ukraine	57.34		2
8	Iuliana Popescu	Romania	:1:00.99		1

=== 3000 metres steeplechase ===
17 June

Rank	Name	Nationality	Time	Notes	Points
1	Cristina Casandra	Romania	9:35.95	CR, SB	8
2	Lyubov Ivanova	Russia	9:46.63	SB	7
3	Justyna Bąk	Poland	9:51.51	SB	6
4	Élodie Olivarès	France	9:56.12		5
5	Verena Dreier	Germany	9:59.22		4
6	Valeriya Mara	Ukraine	10:00.99		3
7	Agnes Tschurtschenthaler	Italy	10:08.42		2
8	Maria Pardalou	Greece	10:08.59	NR	1

=== 4 × 100 metres relay ===
18 June

Rank	Nation	Athletes	Time	Note	Points
1	Russia	Olga Fyodorova, Yuliya Gushchina, Irina Khabarova, Yekaterina Kondratyeva	42.73	SB	8
2	Germany	Katja Wakan, Esther Möller, Birgit Rockmeier, Verena Sailer	43.58	SB	7
3	Italy	Elena Sordelli, Vincenza Calì, Manuela Grillo, Manuela Levorato	43.83	SB	6
4	Poland	Iwona Dorobisz, Daria Onyśko, Dorota Dydo, Anna Guzowska	43.85		5
5	Greece	Eleftheria Kobidou, Georgia Kokloni, Athina Kopsia, Maria Karastamati	44.11	SB	4
6	France	Véronique Mang, Lina Jacques-Sébastien, Fabé Dia, Christine Arron	44.13		3
7	Romania	Diana Tudorache, Angela Moroșanu, Evelina Lisenco, Viorica Țigău	44.35	SB	2
8	Ukraine	Iryna Kozhemyakina, Maryna Maydanova, Iryna Shtanhyeyeva, Nataliya Pyhyda	44.52		1

=== 4 × 400 metres relay ===
19 June

Rank	Nation	Athletes	Time	Note	Points
1	Russia	Yuliya Gushchina, Tatyana Levina, Mariya Lisnichenko, Natalya Antyukh	3:23.56		8
2	Poland	Zuzanna Radecka, Monika Bejnar, Grażyna Prokopek, Anna Jesień	3:24.61	NR	7
3	Ukraine	Antonina Yefremova, Oksana Ilyushkina, Liliya Lobanova, Nataliya Pyhyda	3:26.72	SB	6
4	Romania	Angela Moroșanu, Mihaela Neacşu, Alina Rîpanu, Ionela Târlea-Manolache	3:27.78	SB	5
5	Germany	Ulrike Urbansky, Claudia Hoffmann, Korinna Fink, Claudia Marx	3:27.78	SB	4
6	France	Phara Anacharsis, Elisabeth Grousselle, Sylvanie Morandais, Solen Désert	3:28.92	SB	3
7	Italy	Daniela Graglia, Benedetta Ceccarelli, Monika Niederstätter, Virna De Angeli	3:33.17	SB	2
8	Greece	Maria Pahatouridou, Eleni Filandra, Hristina Hantzi-Neag, Dimitra Dova	3:35.60	SB	1

=== High jump ===
19 June

Rank	Name	Nationality	1.65	1.75	1.80	1.85	1.89	1.92	1.95	1.98	2.00	Result	Notes	Points
1	Tatyana Kivimyagi	Russia	–	–	o	o	o	o	xxo	xo	xxx	1.98	=PB	8
2	Vita Palamar	Ukraine	–	–	o	o	o	o	xxx			1.92		7
3	Melanie Skotnik	France	–	o	o	o	xo	o	xxx			1.92		6
4	Maria Papageorgiou	Greece	–	o	o	xxo	o	xxx				1.89	SB	5
5	Antonietta Di Martino	Italy	–	o	o	xo	xo	xxx				1.89		4
6	Oana Pantelimon	Romania	–	–	o	o	xxx					1.85		3
7	Ariane Friedrich	Germany	–	o	o	xo	xxx					1.85		2
8	Marta Borkowska	Poland	o	o	o	xxo	xxx					1.85		1

=== Pole vault ===
18 June

Rank	Name	Nationality	3.70	3.90	4.05	4.20	4.30	4.40	4.50	4.60	4.80	Result	Notes	Points
1	Anna Rogowska	Poland	–	–	–	–	xo	–	xxo	xo	xxx	4.60		8
2	Carolin Hingst	Germany	–	–	–	o	xxo	o	o	xxx		4.50	SB	7
3	Nataliya Klushch	Ukraine	–	–	o	xo	xo	xxx				4.30		6
4	Afroditi Skafida	Greece	–	–	xo	xo	xo	xxx				4.30		5
5	Natalya Belinskaya	Russia	–	o	o	xo	xxx					4.20		3.5
5	Aurore Pignot	France	o	o	o	xo	xxx					4.20	SB	3.5
7	Francesca Dolcini	Italy	o	o	o	xxx						4.05	SB	2
		Romania										DNS		0

=== Long jump ===
17 June

Rank	Name	Nationality	#1	#2	#3	#4	Result	Notes	Points
1	Irina Simagina	Russia	x	6.76	6.46	x	6.76		8
2	Fiona May	Italy	6.40	6.43	5.51	x	6.43		7
3	Adina Anton	Romania	6.27	x	6.24	6.35	6.35		6
4	Oleksandra Shyshlyuk	Ukraine	6.05	6.35	5.90	6.20	6.35		5
5	Sofia Schulte	Germany	6.30	6.34	6.32	6.22	6.34		4
6	Ioanna Kafetzi	Greece	6.19	x	6.15	6.34	6.34		3
7	Małgorzata Trybańska	Poland	5.93	5.82	6.10	6.24	6.24		2
8	Narayane Dossevi	France	5.99	5.80	5.67	6.05	6.05		1

=== Triple jump ===
18 June

Rank	Name	Nationality	#1	#2	#3	#4	Result	Notes	Points
1	Anna Pyatykh	Russia	x	14.72	x	14.70w	14.72		8
2	Hrisopiyi Devetzi	Greece	x	14.62	14.53	14.59	14.62		7
3	Magdelín Martínez	Italy	14.48	14.50	x	14.54w	14.54w		6
4	Oleksandra Shyshlyuk	Ukraine	x	x	13.78	14.09	14.09	SB	5
5	Mariana Solomon	Romania	13.69	14.06	13.73	13.53w	14.06	SB	4
6	Silvia Otto	Germany	13.47	13.78w	13.76w	14.01w	14.01w		3
7	Betty Lise	France	x	x	13.77	x	13.77		2
8	Aleksandra Fila	Poland	x	13.26	13.69	13.66	13.69		1

=== Shot put ===
19 June

Rank	Name	Nationality	#1	#2	#3	#4	Result	Notes	Points
1	Olga Ryabinkina	Russia	18.69	x	19.65	x	19.65	PB	8
2	Nadine Kleinert	Germany	x	18.53	18.89	x	18.89		7
3	Assunta Legnante	Italy	18.03	17.77	x	18.42	18.42		6
4	Laurence Manfredi	France	17.22	17.36	16.95	16.41	17.36		5
5	Elena Hila	Romania	16.96	17.36	17.14	x	17.36		4
6	Tatyana Nasonova	Ukraine	16.83	x	17.19	x	17.19		3
7	Hrisi Moisidou	Greece	14.22	14.25	x	14.41	14.41		2
8	Marzena Wysocka	Poland	12.11	13.37	13.15	13.62	13.62	SB	1

=== Discus throw ===
17 June

Rank	Name	Nationality	#1	#2	#3	#4	Result	Notes	Points
1	Franka Dietzsch	Germany	64.38	63.84	64.00	64.13	64.38		8
2	Olena Antonova	Ukraine	60.15	61.74	61.79	62.59	62.59		7
3	Marzena Wysocka	Poland	60.23	61.21	61.75	62.28	62.28		6
4	Nicoleta Grasu	Romania	x	60.01	x	60.89	60.89		5
5	Oksana Tuchak	Russia	54.94	x	55.82	58.50	58.50		4
6	Laura Bordignon	Italy	55.42	57.23	56.22	x	57.23		3
7	Areti Abatzi	Greece	54.13	53.49	52.96	x	54.13		2
8	Fanta Diarra	France	41.13	48.82	53.66	53.42	53.66		1

=== Hammer throw ===
19 June

Rank	Name	Nationality	#1	#2	#3	#4	Result	Notes	Points
1	Kamila Skolimowska	Poland	68.27	70.87	x	72.38	72.38		8
2	Manuela Montebrun	France	68.14	68.36	69.45	71.10	71.10		7
3	Gulfiya Khanafeyeva	Russia	66.69	66.79	70.06	x	70.06		6
4	Ester Balassini	Italy	69.74	x	68.22	67.16	69.74		5
5	Susanne Keil	Germany	68.76	65.29	66.59	68.61	68.76		4
6	Mihaela Melinte	Romania	65.80	63.62	x	65.59	65.80		3
7	Inna Sayenko	Ukraine	65.57	x	64.80	61.41	65.57		2
8	Stiliani Papadopoulou	Greece	x	60.06	64.87	59.35	64.87		1

=== Javelin throw ===
18 June

Rank	Name	Nationality	#1	#2	#3	#4	Result	Notes	Points
1	Steffi Nerius	Germany	63.20	64.59	62.73	x	64.59		8
2	Barbara Madejczyk	Poland	57.29	59.62	60.14	61.72	61.72	NR	7
3	Zahra Bani	Italy	53.88	61.66	58.52	59.46	61.66		6
4	Olha Ivankova	Ukraine	59.19	57.03	55.25	56.34	59.19		5
5	Felicia Moldovan	Romania	55.26	x	x	58.34	58.34		4
6	Mirela Manjani	Greece	x	57.21	x	x	57.21		3
7	Mariya Abakumova	Russia	52.71	55.00	x	x	55.00		2
8	Sarah Walter	France	51.29	50.73	48.88	52.82	52.82		1
