= Athletics at the 2005 Mediterranean Games =

2005 Athletics at the Mediterranean Games

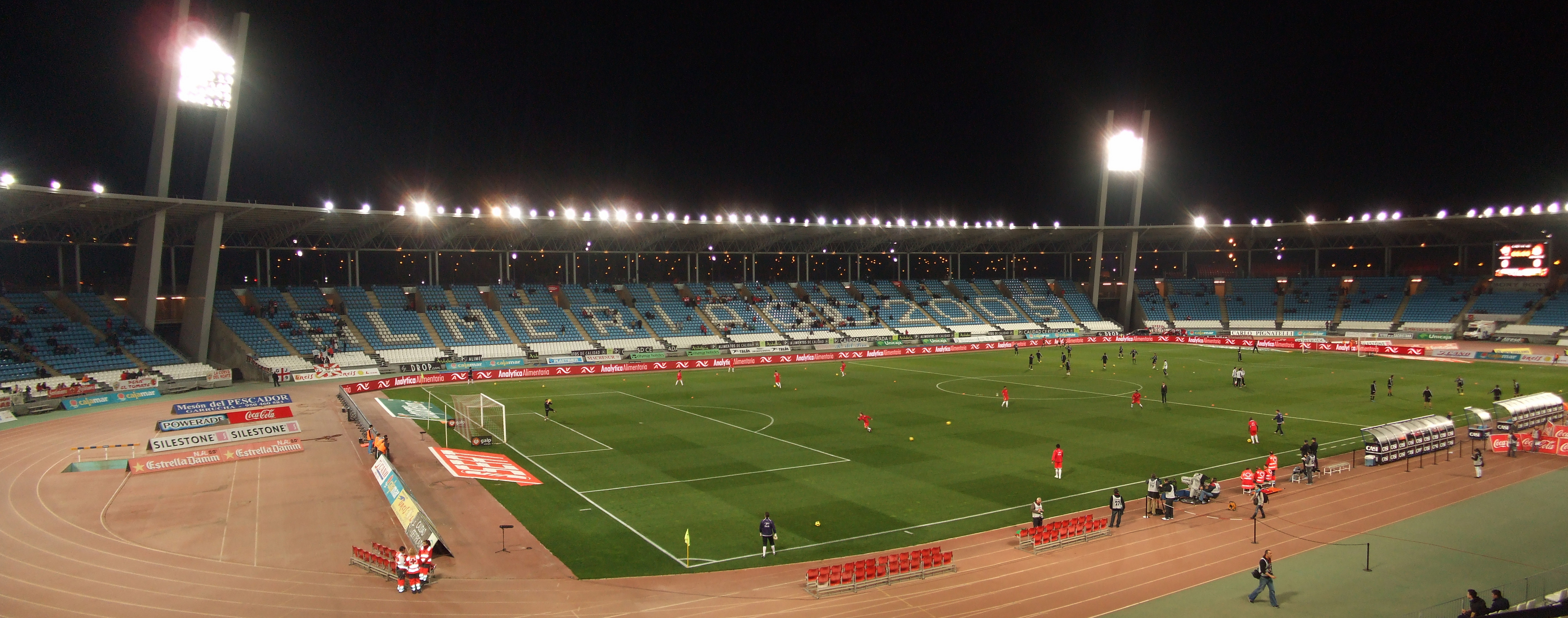
- Dates: 29 June to 2 July 2005
- Host city: Almeria, Spain
- Venue: Mediterraneo Stadium
- Events: 47
- Participation: 432 athletes from 20 nations
- Records set: 9

The athletics competition at the 2005 Mediterranean Games was held in the Mediterraneo Stadium in Almería, Spain from 29 June to 2 July 2005. France topped the medal tally with 10 golds and 30 medals overall, with host nation Italy coming in second with 9 golds and 26 medals overall.

A total of 47 events were contested, with 24 contested by male athletes and 23 contested by female athletes. The 3000 metres steeplechase and 1500 metres wheelchair (males only), and the 800 metres wheelchair (females only) were the only events that were not held for both genders. The 2005 Games also marked the replacement of the marathon event with the half marathon.

== Medal table ==
* Host nation (Italy)

| Rank | Nation | Gold | Silver | Bronze | Total |
|---|---|---|---|---|---|
| 1 | France* | 10 | 13 | 7 | 30 |
| 2 | Spain | 9 | 11 | 6 | 26 |
| 3 | Italy | 7 | 8 | 8 | 23 |
| 4 | Greece | 4 | 2 | 6 | 12 |
| 5 | Algeria | 4 | 1 | 2 | 7 |
| 6 | Morocco | 3 | 6 | 1 | 10 |
| 7 | Tunisia | 3 | 1 | 3 | 7 |
| 8 | Slovenia | 3 | 1 | 2 | 6 |
| 9 | Cyprus | 1 | 2 | 0 | 3 |
| 10 | Croatia | 1 | 1 | 3 | 5 |
| 11 | Serbia and Montenegro | 1 | 1 | 2 | 4 |
| 12 | Turkey | 1 | 0 | 4 | 5 |
| 13 | Albania | 0 | 0 | 1 | 1 |
| 13 | Bosnia and Herzegovina | 0 | 0 | 1 | 1 |
| 13 | Syria | 0 | 0 | 1 | 1 |
| Totals (15 entries) | | 47 | 47 | 47 | 141 |

== Medal summary ==
=== Men's events ===
| Event | Gold | | Silver | | Bronze | |
|---|---|---|---|---|---|---|
| 100 metres | Matic Osovnikar (SLO) | 10.35 | Lueyi Dovy (FRA) | 10.40 | Marco Torrieri (ITA) | 10.46 |
| 200 metres | Matic Osovnikar (SLO) | 20.75 | Alessandro Attene (ITA) | 20.97 | Josip Šoprek (CRO) | 21.02 |
| 400 metres | Sofiane Labidi (TUN) | 45.60 | Željko Vincek (CRO) | 45.90 | Ridha Ghali (TUN) | 45.95 |
| 800 metres | Antonio Reina (ESP) | 1:47.03 | Eugenio Barrios (ESP) | 1:47.36 | Amine Laâlou (MAR) | 1:47.58 |
| 1500 metres | Arturo Casado (ESP) | 3:45.61 | Adil Kaouch (MAR) | 3:45.78 | Christian Obrist (ITA) | 3:45.88 |
| 5000 metres | Ali Saïdi-Sief (ALG) | 13:29.94 | Hicham Bellani (MAR) | 13:30.35 | Khoudir Aggoune (ALG) | 13:30.54 |
| 10000 metres | Mohammed Amyn (MAR) | 29:13.05 | Carles Castillejo (ESP) | 29:13.91 | El Hassan Lahssini (FRA) | 29:15.86 |
| Half Marathon | Saïd Belhout (ALG) | 1:05:01 | Abdelkebir Lamachi (MAR) | 1:05:05 | José Manuel Martínez (ESP) | 1:05:12 |
| 3000 m steeplechase | Brahim Boulami (MAR) | 8:15.15 GR | Antonio David Jiménez (ESP) | 8:24.47 | Gaël Pencreach (FRA) | 8:25.82 |
| 110 m hurdles | Felipe Vivancos (ESP) | 13.53 GR | Andrea Giaconi (ITA) | 13.69 | Jurica Grabušić (CRO) | 13.73 |
| 400 m hurdles | Gianni Carabelli (ITA) | 49.32 | Laurent Ottoz (ITA) | 49.41 | Platon Gavelas (GRE) | 49.99 |
| 4 × 100 m relay | Italy; Luca Verdecchia; Alessandro Attene; Massimiliano Donati; Marco Torrieri | 39.13 | France; Frédéric Krantz; Ydrissa M'Barke; Christophe Cheval; Jimmy Melfort | 39.49 | Slovenia; Matjaž Borovina; Matic Osovnikar; Boštjan Fridrih; Jan Žumer | 39.57 |
| 4 × 400 m relay | Spain; David Canal; David Testa; Eugenio Barrios; Antonio Reina | 3:03.65 | France; Abderrahim El Haouzy; Ahmed Douhou; Remi Wallard; Richard Maunier | 3:04.84 | Tunisia; Ridha Ghali; Laroussi Titi; Kamel Tabbal; Sofiane Labidi | 3:06.13 |
| 20 km walk | Paquillo Fernández (ESP) | 1:22:45 GR | Juan Manuel Molina (ESP) | 1:24:11 | Michele Didoni (ITA) | 1:26:06 |
| High jump | Kyriakos Ioannou (CYP) | 2.24 m | Ioannis Constantinou (CYP) | 2.21 m | Grégory Gabella (FRA) | 2.21 m |
| Pole vault | Konstantinos Filippidis (GRE) | 5.60 m | Pierre-Charles Peuf (FRA) | 5.55 m | Jérôme Clavier (FRA) | 5.55 m |
| Long jump | Salim Sdiri (FRA) | 8.05 m | Issam Nima (ALG) | 7.92 m | Asterios Nousios (GRE) | 7.91 m |
| Triple jump | Hristos Meletoglou (GRE) | 17.09 m | Tarik Bouguetaïb (MAR) | 17.00 m | Sébastien Pincemail (FRA) | 16.73 m |
| Shot put | Edis Elkasević (CRO) | 20.26 m | Manuel Martínez (ESP) | 19.97 m | Hamza Alić (BIH) | 19.49 m |
| Discus | Mario Pestano (ESP) | 63.96 m | Igor Primc (SLO) | 59.27 m | Ercüment Olgundeniz (TUR) | 54.90 m |
| Hammer | Eşref Apak (TUR) | 77.88 m | Alexandros Papadimitriou (GRE) | 75.57 m | Nicolas Figère (FRA) | 75.30 m |
| Javelin | Vitolio Tipotio (FRA) | 75.20 m | Francesco Pignata (ITA) | 74.51 m | Firas Al-Mohammed (SYR) | 73.49 m |
| Decathlon | Romain Barras (FRA) | 8127 pts | Rudy Bourguignon (FRA) | 7886 pts | Hamdi Dhouibi (TUN) | 7847 pts |
| 1500 m wheelchair | Éric Teurnier (FRA) | 3:23.71 | Roger Puigbò (ESP) | 3:24.16 | Maamar Rachif (ALG) | 3:27.28 |

=== Women's events ===
| Event | Gold | | Silver | | Bronze | |
|---|---|---|---|---|---|---|
| 100 metres | Véronique Mang (FRA) | 11.44 | Sylviane Félix (FRA) | 11.46 | Kristina Žumer (SLO) | 11.63 |
| 200 metres | Alenka Bikar (SLO) | 23.65 | Lina Jacques-Sébastien (FRA) | 23.75 | Fabé Dia (FRA) | 23.78 |
| 400 metres | Dimitra Dova (GRE) | 52.67 | Phara Anacharsis (FRA) | 52.70 | Klodiana Shala (ALB) | 53.23 NR |
| 800 metres | Laetitia Valdonado (FRA) | 2:01:71 | Élisabeth Grousselle (FRA) | 2:02:47 | Binnaz Uslu (TUR) | 2:02:68 |
| 1500 metres | Fatma Lanouar (TUN) | 4:10.77 | Sonja Stolić (SCG) | 4:10:92 | Nuria Fernández (ESP) | 4:11:20 |
| 5000 metres | Margaret Maury (FRA) | 15:22.59 | Asmae Leghzaoui (MAR) | 15:23.30 | Silvia Weissteiner (ITA) | 15:28.50 |
| 10000 metres | Souad Aït Salem (ALG) | 32:55.48 | Asmae Leghzaoui (MAR) | 32:59.24 | Olivera Jevtić (SCG) | 33:30.4 |
| Half Marathon | Zhor El Kamch (MAR) | 1:13:50 | Rosaria Console (ITA) | 1:15:40 | Olivera Jevtić (SCG) | 1:16:32 |
| 100 m hurdles | Glory Alozie (ESP) | 12.90 | Adrianna Lamalle (FRA) | 12.99 | Flora Redoumi (GRE) | 13.16 |
| 400 m hurdles | Benedetta Ceccarelli (ITA) | 55.76 | Cora Olivero (ESP) | 55.85 | Monika Niederstätter (ITA) | 56.39 |
| 4 × 100 m relay | France; Véronique Mang; Lina Jacques-Sébastien; Fabé Dia; Carima Louami | 43.75 | Spain; Carme Blay; Belén Recio; Cristina Sanz; Glory Alozie | 44.47 | Italy; Elena Sordelli; Daniela Bellanova; Manuela Grillo; Doris Tomasini | 45.18 |
| 4 × 400 m relay | Spain; Julia Alba; Belén Recio; Cora Olivero; Mayte Martínez | 3:31.45 | France; Phara Anacharsis; Laetitia Valdonado; Olivia Abderrhamanne; Élisabeth Grousselle | 3:31.86 | Turkey; Özge Gürler; Birsen Bekgöz; Binnaz Uslu; Pınar Saka | 3:40.75 |
| 20 km walk | Elisa Rigaudo (ITA) | 1:32:44 GR | María Vasco (ESP) | 1:34:28 | Beatriz Pascual (ESP) | 1:36:27 |
| High jump | Ruth Beitia (ESP) | 1.95 m | Melanie Skotnik (FRA) | 1.95 m | Marta Mendía (ESP) | 1.89 m |
| Pole vault | Vanessa Boslak (FRA) | 4.40 m GR | Anna Fitídou (CYP) | 4.25 m | Afroditi Skafida (GRE) | 4.15 m |
| Long jump | Fiona May (ITA) | 6.64 m | Niurka Montalvo (ESP) | 6.55 m | Concepción Montaner (ESP) | 6.49 m |
| Triple jump | Baya Rahouli (ALG) | 14.98 m GR | Carlota Castrejana (ESP) | 14.60 m | Hrysopiyi Devetzi (GRE) | 14.33 m |
| Shot put | Cristiana Checchi (ITA) | 18.59 m GR | Laurence Manfredi (FRA) | 17.47 m | Chiara Rosa (ITA) | 17.34 m |
| Discus | Dragana Tomašević (SCG) | 62.10 m | Laura Bordignon (ITA) | 57.98 m | Vera Begić (CRO) | 56.53 m |
| Hammer | Ester Balassini (ITA) | 71.17 m GR | Clarissa Claretti (ITA) | 69.24 m | Alexandra Papageorgiou (GRE) | 67.13 m |
| Javelin | Aggeliki Tsiolakoudi (GRE) | 62.61 m GR | Zahra Bani (ITA) | 62.36 m | Mercedes Chilla (ESP) | 57.69 m |
| Heptathlon | Marie Collonvillé (FRA) | 6017 pts | Argyro Strataki (GRE) | 5943 pts | Anzhela Atroshchenko (TUR) | 5870 pts |
| 800 m wheelchair | Samira Berri (TUN) | 2:00.16 | Messaouda Sifi (TUN) | 2:02.58 | Christina Sanna (ITA) | 2:07.42 |

== Participating nations ==
- Albania (1)
- Algeria (17)
- Bosnia and Herzegovina (3)
- Croatia (18)
- Cyprus (9)
- Egypt (6)
- France (66)
- Greece (37)
- Italy (64)
- Lebanon (2)
- Libya (3)
- Malta (5)
- Monaco (2)
- Morocco (34)
- Serbia and Montenegro (10)
- Slovenia (19)
- Spain (102)
- Syria (2)
- Turkey (20)
- Tunisia (12)

== Men's results ==
=== 100 meters ===
Heats – June 30
Wind:
Heat 1: -0.9 m/s, Heat 2: +0.6 m/s, Heat 3: -1.0 m/s

| Rank | Heat | Name | Nationality | Time | Notes |
|---|---|---|---|---|---|
| 1 | 1 | Luca Verdecchia | Italy | 10.47 | Q, F1 |
| 2 | 2 | Aristides Petridis | Greece | 10.48 | Q |
| 3 | 2 | Matic Osovnikar | Slovenia | 10.49 | Q |
| 4 | 3 | Marco Torrieri | Italy | 10.61 | Q |
| 5 | 3 | Lueyi Dovy | France | 10.61 | Q |
| 6 | 1 | Jan Žumer | Slovenia | 10.62 | Q |
| 7 | 3 | Ángel David Rodríguez | Spain | 10.63 | q |
| 8 | 2 | Josip Šoprek | Croatia | 10.67 | q |
| 9 | 1 | Cecilio Maestra | Spain | 10.68 | |
| 10 | 1 | Kostas Vogiatzakis | Greece | 10.73 | |
| 11 | 1 | Frédéric Krantz | France | 10.76 | |
| 12 | 2 | İsmail Aslan | Turkey | 10.78 | |
| 13 | 3 | Jurica Grabušić | Croatia | 10.80 | |
| 14 | 3 | Marko Janković | Serbia and Montenegro | 10.83 | |
| 15 | 2 | Darren Gilford | Malta | 10.88 | |
| 16 | 1 | Jeandre Mallia | Malta | 11.17 | |
| | 2 | Salem Awwad | Egypt | DQ | F1, F2 |
| | 3 | Amr Ibrahim Mostafa Seoud | Egypt | DNS | |

Final – June 30
Wind:
-0.4 m/s

| Rank | Lane | Name | Nationality | Time | Notes |
|---|---|---|---|---|---|
| 1st place, gold medalist(s) | 5 | Matic Osovnikar | Slovenia | 10.35 | SB |
| 2nd place, silver medalist(s) | 8 | Lueyi Dovy | France | 10.40 | |
| 3rd place, bronze medalist(s) | 3 | Marco Torrieri | Italy | 10.46 | |
| 4 | 6 | Aristides Petridis | Greece | 10.46 | |
| 5 | 4 | Luca Verdecchia | Italy | 10.49 | F1 |
| 6 | 7 | Jan Žumer | Slovenia | 10.57 | |
| 7 | 2 | Josip Šoprek | Croatia | 10.72 | |
| | 1 | Ángel David Rodríguez | Spain | DNF | |

=== 200 meters ===
Heats – June 29
Wind:
Heat 1: +0.4 m/s, Heat 2: -1.1 m/s

| Rank | Heat | Name | Nationality | Time | Notes |
|---|---|---|---|---|---|
| 1 | 2 | Ydrissa M'Barke | France | 21.07 | Q |
| 2 | 1 | Matic Osovnikar | Slovenia | 21.08 | Q |
| 3 | 1 | Alessandro Attene | Italy | 21.14 | Q |
| 4 | 1 | Malik Louahla | Algeria | 21.18 | Q |
| 5 | 2 | Josip Šoprek | Croatia | 21.24 | Q |
| 6 | 1 | Christophe Cheval | France | 21.29 | q |
| 7 | 2 | Alessandro Cavallaro | Italy | 21.39 | Q |
| 8 | 1 | Julian Martínez | Spain | 21.57 | q |
| 9 | 2 | José María Garcia-Borreguero | Spain | 21.63 | |
| 10 | 1 | İsmail Aslan | Turkey | 21.70 | PB |
| 11 | 2 | Ismael Daif | Morocco | 21.76 | |
| 12 | 1 | Salem Awwad | Egypt | 21.87 | |
| 13 | 2 | Mario Bonello | Malta | 21.92 | |
| | 2 | Amr Ibrahim Mostafa Seoud | Egypt | DNF | F1 |

Final – June 29
Wind:
+0.6 m/s

| Rank | Lane | Name | Nationality | Time | Notes |
|---|---|---|---|---|---|
| 1st place, gold medalist(s) | 4 | Matic Osovnikar | Slovenia | 20.75 | SB |
| 2nd place, silver medalist(s) | 3 | Alessandro Attene | Italy | 20.97 | |
| 3rd place, bronze medalist(s) | 5 | Josip Šoprek | Croatia | 21.02 | |
| 4 | 5 | Ydrissa M'Barke | France | 21.07 | |
| 5 | 1 | Malik Louahla | Algeria | 21.15 | |
| 6 | 8 | Christophe Cheval | France | 21.21 | |
| 7 | 7 | Alessandro Cavallaro | Italy | 21.49 | |
| 8 | 7 | Julian Martínez | Spain | 21.60 | |

=== 400 meters ===
Heats – June 30

| Rank | Heat | Name | Nationality | Time | Notes |
|---|---|---|---|---|---|
| 1 | 2 | Ridha Ghali | Tunisia | 46.22 | Q, SB |
| 2 | 1 | Sofiane Labidi | Tunisia | 46.31 | Q |
| 3 | 1 | David Testa | Spain | 46.35 | Q, PB |
| 4 | 1 | Željko Vincek | Croatia | 46.43 | Q |
| 5 | 2 | Edoardo Vallet | Italy | 46.62 | Q |
| 6 | 1 | Georgios Ntoupis | Greece | 46.71 | q |
| 7 | 2 | Abderrahim El Haouzy | France | 46.72 | Q |
| 8 | 2 | Stylianos Dimotsios | Greece | 46.77 | q, SB |
| 9 | 2 | David Canal | Spain | 46.78 | SB |
| 10 | 1 | Luca Galletti | Italy | 46.86 | |
| 11 | 1 | Richard Maunier | France | 46.94 | |
| 12 | 2 | Abdelkrim Khoudri | Morocco | 47.22 | |
| 13 | 2 | Florent Battistel | Monaco | 49.59 | NR |
| | 1 | Abdellatif El Ghazaoui | Morocco | DNS | |

Final – July 1

| Rank | Lane | Name | Nationality | Time | Notes |
|---|---|---|---|---|---|
| 1st place, gold medalist(s) | 5 | Sofiane Labidi | Tunisia | 45.60 | |
| 2nd place, silver medalist(s) | 2 | Željko Vincek | Croatia | 45.90 | PB |
| 3rd place, bronze medalist(s) | 6 | Ridha Ghali | Tunisia | 45.95 | SB |
| 4 | 7 | Stylianos Dimotsios | Greece | 46.65 | SB |
| 5 | 8 | Abderrahim El Haouzy | France | 46.67 | |
| 6 | 1 | Georgios Ntoupis | Greece | 46.72 | |
| 7 | 4 | David Testa | Spain | 46.97 | |
| 8 | 3 | Edoardo Vallet | Italy | 47.18 | |

=== 800 meters ===
Heats – June 29

| Rank | Heat | Name | Nationality | Time | Notes |
|---|---|---|---|---|---|
| 1 | 1 | Antonio Manuel Reina | Spain | 1:47.95 | Q |
| 2 | 1 | Amine Laâlou | Morocco | 1:48.07 | Q |
| 3 | 1 | Nabil Madi | Algeria | 1:48.13 | Q |
| 4 | 1 | Christian Neunhauserer | Italy | 1:48.56 | q |
| 5 | 1 | Antoine Martiak | France | 1:50.01 | q |
| 6 | 2 | Eugenio Barrios | Spain | 1:50.23 | Q |
| 7 | 2 | Mouhssin Chehibi | Morocco | 1:50.25 | Q |
| 8 | 2 | Antar Zerguelaïne | Algeria | 1:50.37 | Q |
| 9 | 1 | Abubaker El Gatroni | Libya | 1:50.38 | |
| 10 | 2 | Maurizio Bobbato | Italy | 1:50.72 | |
| 11 | 2 | Selahattin Çobanoğlu | Turkey | 1:50.86 | |

Final – July 1

| Rank | Name | Nationality | Time | Notes |
|---|---|---|---|---|
| 1st place, gold medalist(s) | Antonio Manuel Reina | Spain | 1:47.03 | |
| 2nd place, silver medalist(s) | Eugenio Barrios | Spain | 1:47.36 | |
| 3rd place, bronze medalist(s) | Amine Laâlou | Morocco | 1:47.58 | |
| 4 | Antar Zerguelaïne | Algeria | 1:47.92 | SB |
| 5 | Nabil Madi | Algeria | 1:48.14 | |
| 6 | Mouhssin Chehibi | Morocco | 1:48.35 | |
| 7 | Christian Neunhauserer | Italy | 1:48.64 | |
| 8 | Antoine Martiak | France | 1:49.46 | |

=== 1500 meters ===
July 1

| Rank | Name | Nationality | Time | Notes |
|---|---|---|---|---|
| 1st place, gold medalist(s) | Arturo Casado | Spain | 3:45.61 | |
| 2nd place, silver medalist(s) | Adil Kaouch | Morocco | 3:45.78 | |
| 3rd place, bronze medalist(s) | Christian Obrist | Italy | 3:45.88 | |
| 4 | Sergio Gallardo | Spain | 3:45.95 | |
| 5 | Tarek Boukensa | Algeria | 3:46.04 | |
| 6 | Kamal Boulahfane | Algeria | 3:46.10 | |
| 7 | Youssef Baba | Morocco | 3:47.02 | |
| 8 | Aléxis Abraham | France | 3:47.10 | |
| 9 | Darko Radomirović | Serbia and Montenegro | 3:48.08 | |
| 10 | Mirko Petrović | Serbia and Montenegro | 3:48.66 | |
| 11 | Fabio Lettieri | Italy | 3:50.44 | |
| 12 | Walid Walid | Libya | 3:53.07 | |

=== 5000 meters ===
July 2

| Rank | Name | Nationality | Time | Notes |
|---|---|---|---|---|
| 1st place, gold medalist(s) | Ali Saïdi-Sief | Algeria | 13:29.94 | |
| 2nd place, silver medalist(s) | Hicham Bellani | Morocco | 13:30.35 | |
| 3rd place, bronze medalist(s) | Khoudir Aggoune | Algeria | 13:30.54 | SB |
| 4 | Abderrahim Goumri | Morocco | 13:31.41 | |
| 5 | Roberto García | Spain | 13:33.25 | |
| 6 | Manuel Ángel Penas | Spain | 13:53.33 | SB |
| 7 | Simone Zanon | Italy | 13:56.95 | SB |
| 8 | Khalid Zoubaa | France | 14:06.08 | |
| 9 | Slavko Petrović | Croatia | 14:07.02 | SB |
| 10 | Michail Gelasakis | Greece | 14:07.44 | |
| 11 | Mirko Petrović | Serbia and Montenegro | 14:09.07 | |
| 12 | Moktar Benhari | France | 14:13.99 | |
| 12 | Salvatore Vincenti | Italy | DNF | |

=== 10,000 meters ===
July 1

| Rank | Name | Nationality | Time | Notes |
|---|---|---|---|---|
| 1st place, gold medalist(s) | Mohammed Amyn | Morocco | 29:13.05 | |
| 2nd place, silver medalist(s) | Carles Castillejo | Spain | 29:13.91 | |
| 3rd place, bronze medalist(s) | El Hassan Lahssini | France | 29:15.86 | |
| 4 | Ricardo Serrano | Spain | 29:16.87 | |
| 5 | Pierre Joncheray | France | 29:20.14 | |
| 6 | Khalid El Aamri | Morocco | 29:27.94 | |
| 7 | Maurizio Leone | Italy | 29:34.58 | |

=== Half marathon ===
July 2

| Rank | Name | Nationality | Time | Notes |
|---|---|---|---|---|
| 1st place, gold medalist(s) | Saïd Belhout | Algeria | 1:05:01 | PB |
| 2nd place, silver medalist(s) | Abdelkebir Lamachi | Morocco | 1:05:05 | |
| 3rd place, bronze medalist(s) | José Manuel Martínez | Spain | 1:05:12 | |
| 4 | Giuliano Battocletti | Italy | 1:05:28 | |
| 5 | José Ríos | Spain | 1:05:59 | |
| 6 | Ismaïl Sghyr | France | 1:07:02 | |
| 7 | Denis Curzi | Italy | 1:07:03 | |
| 8 | Zaid Laroussi | Morocco | 1:07:10 | |
| 9 | Abdülkadir Türk | Turkey | 1:08:10 | |
| 10 | Ridha Amri | Tunisia | 1:09:37 | |
| 11 | Samuel Urbano | Spain | 1:09:51 | |
| 12 | José Antonio García | Spain | 1:11:01 | |
| 13 | Agustin Molina | Spain | 1:11:48 | |
| 14 | José Cardoso | Spain | 1:12:16 | |
| 15 | Pablo Fontán | Spain | 1:12:57 | |
| 16 | Manuel Jesús Salinas | Spain | 1:13:20 | |
| 17 | Vicente Jiménez | Spain | 1:14:02 | |
| 18 | Juan Antonio Ruiz | Spain | 1:14:32 | |
| 19 | José Luis Baro | Spain | 1:15:08 | |
| 20 | José María Pérez | Spain | 1:16:42 | |
| 21 | Juan Luis Ramon | Spain | 1:17:20 | |
| | Javier Díaz | Spain | DNF | |
| | Francesco Bennici | Italy | DNF | |
| | Luis Sánchez | Spain | DNF | |
| | Kamel Ziani | Spain | DNS | |
| | Salah Hissou | Morocco | DNS | |

=== 110 meters hurdles ===
Heats – June 29
Wind:
Heat 1: -1.1 m/s, Heat 2: -0.5 m/s

| Rank | Heat | Name | Nationality | Time | Notes |
|---|---|---|---|---|---|
| 1 | 1 | Andrea Giaconi | Italy | 13.60 | Q |
| 2 | 1 | Cédric Lavanne | France | 13.68 | Q, SB |
| 3 | 1 | Jurica Grabušić | Croatia | 13.83 | Q, SB |
| 4 | 1 | Damjan Zlatnar | Slovenia | 13.87 | q |
| 5 | 1 | Damir Haračić | Bosnia and Herzegovina | 13.96 | q |
| 6 | 2 | Felipe Vivancos | Spain | 13.97 | Q |
| 7 | 2 | Nenad Lončar | Serbia and Montenegro | 14.01 | Q |
| 8 | 2 | Alexandros Theofanov | Greece | 14.04 | Q |
| 9 | 1 | Iban Maiza | Spain | 14.09 | SB, F1 |
| 10 | 2 | Andrea Alterio | Italy | 14.22 | |
| 11 | 1 | Anthony De Sevelinges | Monaco | 16.17 | |
| | 1 | Christos Oikonomopoulos | Greece | DQ | F2 |
| | 2 | Zuheir El-Menghawi | Libya | DQ | F1 |

Final – June 29
Wind:
+0.3 m/s

| Rank | Lane | Name | Nationality | Time | Notes |
|---|---|---|---|---|---|
| 1st place, gold medalist(s) | 4 | Felipe Vivancos | Spain | 13.53 | GR |
| 2nd place, silver medalist(s) | 3 | Andrea Giaconi | Italy | 13.69 | |
| 3rd place, bronze medalist(s) | 1 | Jurica Grabušić | Croatia | 13.73 | SB |
| 4 | 8 | Damjan Zlatnar | Slovenia | 13.76 | |
| 5 | 5 | Cédric Lavanne | France | 13.76 | F1 |
| 6 | 2 | Alexandros Theofanov | Greece | 13.85 | |
| 7 | 6 | Nenad Lončar | Serbia and Montenegro | 14.02 | |
| 8 | 7 | Damir Haračić | Bosnia and Herzegovina | 14.06 | |

=== 400 meters hurdles ===
Heats – July 2

| Rank | Heat | Name | Nationality | Time | Notes |
|---|---|---|---|---|---|
| 1 | 1 | Platon Gavelas | Greece | 50.28 | Q, SB |
| 2 | 1 | Gianni Carabelli | Italy | 50.49 | Q |
| 3 | 2 | Sébastien Maillard | France | 50.88 | Q |
| 4 | 1 | Tuncay Örs | Turkey | 50.89 | Q, PB |
| 5 | 2 | Laurent Ottoz | Italy | 51.01 | Q |
| 6 | 1 | Badr El Amine | Morocco | 51.13 | q |
| 7 | 2 | Milan Kotur | Croatia | 51.15 | Q, PB |
| 8 | 1 | Javier Gutierrez | Spain | 51.18 | q, PB |
| 9 | 2 | Alejandro Navarro | Spain | 51.33 | PB |
| 10 | 2 | Hamid Ben Hammou | Morocco | 51.56 | |
| 11 | 2 | Sotirios Iakovakis | Greece | 51.68 | |

Final – July 1

| Rank | Lane | Name | Nationality | Time | Notes |
|---|---|---|---|---|---|
| 1st place, gold medalist(s) | 5 | Gianni Carabelli | Italy | 49.32 | PB |
| 2nd place, silver medalist(s) | 3 | Laurent Ottoz | Italy | 49.41 | SB |
| 3rd place, bronze medalist(s) | 4 | Platon Gavelas | Greece | 49.99 | PB |
| 4 | 6 | Sébastien Maillard | France | 50.71 | |
| 5 | 2 | Badr El Amine | Morocco | 50.84 | SB |
| 6 | 1 | Milan Kotur | Croatia | 51.10 | PB |
| 7 | 8 | Javier Gutierrez | Spain | 51.46 | |
| 8 | 7 | Tuncay Örs | Turkey | 52.55 | |

=== 3000 meters steeplechase ===
July 1

| Rank | Name | Nationality | Time | Notes |
|---|---|---|---|---|
| 1st place, gold medalist(s) | Brahim Boulami | Morocco | 8:15.15 | GR |
| 2nd place, silver medalist(s) | Antonio David Jiménez | Spain | 8:24.47 | |
| 3rd place, bronze medalist(s) | Gaël Pencreach | France | 8:25.82 | |
| 4 | Eliseo Martín | Spain | 8:26.85 | |
| 5 | Hamid Ezzine | Morocco | 8:27.49 | SB |
| 6 | Vincent Zouaoui-Dandrieux | France | 8:29.43 | PB |
| 7 | Yuri Floriani | Italy | 8:44.86 | |
| 8 | Halil Akkaş | Turkey | 8:52.48 | |

=== 4 × 100 meters relay ===
July 1

| Rank | Lane | Nation | Competitors | Time | Notes |
|---|---|---|---|---|---|
| 1st place, gold medalist(s) | 2 | Italy | Luca Verdecchia, Alessandro Attene, Massimiliano Donati, Marco Torrieri | 39.13 | |
| 2nd place, silver medalist(s) | 6 | France | Frédéric Krantz, Ydrissa M'Barke, Christophe Cheval, Jimmy Melfort | 39.49 | |
| 3rd place, bronze medalist(s) | 5 | Slovenia | Matjaž Borovina, Matic Osovnikar, Boštjan Fridrih, Jan Žumer | 39.57 | |
| 4 | 4 | Greece | Evangelos Chalastaras, Kostas Vogiatzakis, Aristides Petridis, Stylianos Dimotsios | 39.81 | |
| 5 | 7 | Spain | José María Garcia-Borreguero, Ángel David Rodríguez, Orkatz Beitia, Julian Martínez | 39.84 | |
| 6 | 3 | Morocco | Younès Moudrik, Hamid Ben Hammou, Ismael Daif, Yahya Berrabah | 40.54 | |
| 7 | 8 | Malta | Jeandre Mallia, Rachid Chouhal, Mario Bonello, Darren Gilford | 41.63 | |

=== 4 × 400 meters relay ===
July 2

| Rank | Nation | Competitors | Time | Notes |
|---|---|---|---|---|
| 1st place, gold medalist(s) | Spain | David Canal, David Testa, Eugenio Barrios, Antonio Manuel Reina | 3:03.65 | |
| 2nd place, silver medalist(s) | France | Abderrahim El Haouzy, Ahmed Douhou, Remi Wallard, Richard Maunier | 3:04.84 | |
| 3rd place, bronze medalist(s) | Tunisia | Ridha Ghali, Laroussi Titi, Kamel Tabbal, Sofiane Labidi | 3:06.13 | |
| 4 | Greece | Sotirios Iakovakis, Georgios Ntoupis, Platon Gavelas, Stylianos Dimotsios | 3:08.72 | |
| 5 | Morocco | Abdelkrim Khoudri, Hamid Ben Hammou, Badr El Amine, Ismael Daif | 3:11.57 | |
| | Italy | | DNS | |

=== 20 kilometers walk ===
June 30

| Rank | Name | Nationality | Time | Notes |
|---|---|---|---|---|
| 1st place, gold medalist(s) | Paquillo Fernández | Spain | 1:22:45 | GB |
| 2nd place, silver medalist(s) | Juan Manuel Molina | Spain | 1:24:11 | |
| 3rd place, bronze medalist(s) | Michele Didoni | Italy | 1:26:06 | |
| 4 | Hassanine Sebei | Tunisia | 1:26:42 | |
| 5 | Daniel Garzon | Spain | 1:28:45 | |
| 6 | Predrag Filipović | Serbia and Montenegro | 1:31:15 | |
| 7 | Joaquin Pampin | Spain | 1:32:05 | |
| 8 | David Mateos | Spain | 1:35:06 | |
| | Hatem Ghoula | Tunisia | DQ | |
| | Yohann Diniz | France | DQ | |
| | Francisco Pinardo | Spain | DQ | |
| | Manuel Hurtado | Spain | DQ | |
| | Francisco Gutierrez | Spain | DNF | |

=== High jump ===
June 30

| Rank | Name | Nationality | 2.00 | 2.05 | 2.10 | 2.14 | 2.18 | 2.21 | 2.24 | 2.27 | 2.30 | Result | Notes |
|---|---|---|---|---|---|---|---|---|---|---|---|---|---|
| 1st place, gold medalist(s) | Kyriakos Ioannou | Cyprus | – | – | o | o | o | o | xo | x– | xx | 2.24 | |
| 2nd place, silver medalist(s) | Ioannis Constantinou | Cyprus | – | o | o | o | o | o | xx– | x | | 2.21 | |
| 3rd place, bronze medalist(s) | Grégory Gabella | France | – | – | – | o | xo | xo | xxx | | | 2.21 | |
| 4 | Nicola Ciotti | Italy | – | – | – | – | – | xxo | xxx | | | 2.21 | |
| 5 | Javier Bermejo | Spain | – | – | o | o | xo | xxx | | | | 2.18 | SB |
| 5 | Enrique Márquez | Spain | o | – | o | o | xo | xxx | | | | 2.18 | SB |
| 7 | Dimitrios Syrrakos | Greece | – | – | o | o | xxo | xxx | | | | 2.18 | |
| 8 | Rožle Prezelj | Slovenia | – | – | o | xo | xxo | xxx | | | | 2.18 | |
| 9 | Mickaël Hanany | France | – | – | – | o | xxx | | | | | 2.14 | |
| 10 | Jean-Claude Rabbath | Lebanon | – | o | o | xxo | xxx | | | | | 2.14 | |
| 11 | Ahmed Abd El Zaher | Egypt | xo | o | xo | xxx | | | | | | 2.10 | |
| | Alessandro Talotti | Italy | – | | | | | | | | | DNF | |

=== Pole vault ===
July 1

| Rank | Name | Nationality | 5.00 | 5.20 | 5.35 | 5.45 | 5.55 | 5.60 | 5.65 | Result | Notes |
|---|---|---|---|---|---|---|---|---|---|---|---|
| 1st place, gold medalist(s) | Konstadinos Filippidis | Greece | – | o | xo | o | o | o | xxx | 5.60 | |
| 2nd place, silver medalist(s) | Pierre-Charles Peuf | France | – | o | o | xxo | o | x– | xx | 5.55 | |
| 3rd place, bronze medalist(s) | Jérôme Clavier | France | – | o | xxo | xo | xo | x– | xx | 5.55 | |
| 4 | Giorgio Piantella | Italy | o | xo | xxo | xxo | xxx | | | 5.45 | SB |
| 5 | Andrej Poljanec | Slovenia | o | o | xxx | | | | | 5.20 | |
| 6 | Javier Gazol | Spain | – | xo | – | xxx | | | | 5.20 | |
| 7 | Roger Noguera | Spain | o | xxx | | | | | | 5.00 | |
| 7 | Matteo Rubbiani | Italy | o | xxx | | | | | | 5.00 | |
| 9 | Mohamed Karbib | Morocco | xo | xxx | | | | | | 5.00 | |
| | Jurij Rovan | Slovenia | – | xxx | | | | | | NM | |

=== Long jump ===
July 2

| Rank | Name | Nationality | #1 | #2 | #3 | #4 | #5 | #6 | Result | Notes |
|---|---|---|---|---|---|---|---|---|---|---|
| 1st place, gold medalist(s) | Salim Sdiri | France | 7.80 | 8.05 | x | x | 7.97 | 7.71 | 8.05 | |
| 2nd place, silver medalist(s) | Issam Nima | Algeria | x | 7.79 | 7.67 | x | 7.92 | x | 7.92 | |
| 3rd place, bronze medalist(s) | Asterios Nousios | Greece | 7.90 | 7.91 | 7.70 | 7.73 | x | x | 7.91 | |
| 4 | Yahya Berrabah | Morocco | 7.82 | x | 7.90 | x | x | 7.55 | 7.90 | SB |
| 5 | Ivan Pucelj | Croatia | 7.80 | 7.89 | 7.17 | 7.70 | x | 7.71 | 7.89 | SB |
| 6 | Kafétien Gomis | France | 7.79 | x | 7.84 | x | x | 7.88 | 7.88 | |
| 7 | Tarik Bouguetaïb | Morocco | 5.93 | 7.84 | 7.69 | 7.67 | 7.81 | x | 7.84 | |
| 8 | Marijo Baković | Croatia | 7.72 | 7.65 | 7.79 | 7.63 | 7.53 | 7.61 | 7.79 | SB |
| 9 | Stefano Dacastello | Italy | 7.72 | 5.63 | 7.72 | | | | 7.72 | SB |
| 10 | Alberto Sanz | Spain | 7.67 | 7.64 | 7.55 | | | | 7.67 | |
| 11 | Ferhat Çiçek | Turkey | 7.43 | 7.43 | 7.50 | | | | 7.50 | |
| 12 | Jan Žumer | Slovenia | x | x | 7.48 | | | | 7.48 | |
| 13 | Boštjan Fridrih | Slovenia | 7.37 | x | 7.45 | | | | 7.45 | |
| 14 | Marc Habib | Lebanon | 7.29 | 7.06 | 7.20 | | | | 7.29 | |
| 15 | Rachid Chouhal | Malta | x | 7.22 | 5.23 | | | | 7.22 | |

=== Triple jump ===
June 29

| Rank | Name | Nationality | #1 | #2 | #3 | #4 | #5 | #6 | Result | Notes |
|---|---|---|---|---|---|---|---|---|---|---|
| 1st place, gold medalist(s) | Hristos Meletoglou | Greece | 16.74 | 17.09w | x | x | x | – | 17.09w | |
| 2nd place, silver medalist(s) | Tarik Bouguetaïb | Morocco | x | 16.84 | 16.83 | 16.95 | 17.00 | 16.87 | 17.00 | PB |
| 3rd place, bronze medalist(s) | Sébastien Pincemail | France | 15.97 | 15.80 | 16.67 | 16.40 | 16.73 | 16.56 | 16.73 | |
| 4 | Mohamed Hazouri | Syria | 16.19 | 15.78 | 16.67 | x | x | x | 16.67 | PB |
| 5 | Younès Moudrik | Morocco | 16.10 | x | 16.65 | 16.33 | 16.41 | 16.58 | 16.65 | |
| 6 | Andrés Capellán | Spain | 15.93 | 16.35 | 16.38w | 15.74 | 15.91 | x | 16.38w | |
| 7 | Pere Joseph | Spain | 16.38 | 16.08 | 16.25 | – | 14.68 | 16.01 | 16.38 | PB |
| 8 | Emanuele Sardano | Italy | 15.70 | 16.03 | 16.19 | 16.37 | x | 16.18 | 16.37 | |
| 9 | Julien Kapek | France | 16.19 | x | x | | | | 16.19 | |
| 10 | Boštjan Šimunič | Slovenia | x | x | 16.17 | | | | 16.17 | |
| 11 | Ferhat Çiçek | Turkey | 15.52 | 16.03 | x | | | | 16.03 | |

=== Shot put ===
July 2

| Rank | Name | Nationality | #1 | #2 | #3 | #4 | #5 | #6 | Result | Notes |
|---|---|---|---|---|---|---|---|---|---|---|
| 1st place, gold medalist(s) | Edis Elkasević | Croatia | 18.99 | x | x | 19.65 | 20.26 | x | 20.26 | |
| 2nd place, silver medalist(s) | Manuel Martínez | Spain | x | 19.97 | x | 19.79 | 19.92 | 19.73 | 19.97 | |
| 3rd place, bronze medalist(s) | Hamza Alić | Bosnia and Herzegovina | 19.49 | 19.19 | x | 18.81 | 18.90 | 18.92 | 19.49 | PB |
| 4 | Miran Vodovnik | Slovenia | 18.75 | x | 18.65 | 19.21 | x | x | 19.21 | |
| 5 | Edhem Kacević | Bosnia and Herzegovina | 18.55 | 18.67 | 18.70 | 18.64 | x | 19.11 | 19.11 | |
| 6 | Gaëtan Bucki | France | 18.61 | x | 18.52 | 18.47 | x | x | 18.61 | |
| 7 | Marco Dodoni | Italy | 18.35 | x | 18.33 | 18.13 | x | 18.43 | 18.43 | |
| 8 | Borja Vivas | Spain | 17.19 | 17.58 | x | x | x | x | 17.58 | |
| 9 | Yasser Ibrahim Farag | Egypt | 17.19 | 17.36 | 17.36 | | | | 17.36 | |
| | Fatih Yazıcı | Turkey | x | x | x | | | | NM | |

=== Discus throw ===
June 30

| Rank | Name | Nationality | #1 | #2 | #3 | #4 | #5 | #6 | Result | Notes |
|---|---|---|---|---|---|---|---|---|---|---|
| 1st place, gold medalist(s) | Mario Pestano | Spain | 60.27 | x | x | 63.31 | x | 63.96 | 63.96 | SB |
| 2nd place, silver medalist(s) | Igor Primc | Slovenia | 56.18 | 58.45 | 56.48 | 59.27 | x | – | 59.27 | SB |
| 3rd place, bronze medalist(s) | Ercüment Olgundeniz | Turkey | 59.16 | x | 59.05 | x | x | x | 59.16 | |
| 4 | Cristiano Andrei | Italy | 57.70 | 56.41 | 56.12 | 56.73 | 57.74 | 56.16 | 57.74 | |
| 5 | Manuel Florido | Spain | 57.00 | x | x | 55.20 | 54.93 | x | 57.00 | SB |
| 6 | Spyridon Arampatzis | Greece | 56.10 | x | x | x | 56.50 | x | 56.50 | |
| 7 | Yasser Ibrahim Farag | Egypt | 55.25 | 55.37 | 55.38 | x | x | x | 55.38 | |
| 8 | Yannick Gunzle | France | 55.03 | 54.35 | x | x | 53.54 | 53.47 | 55.03 | |
| 9 | Martin Marić | Croatia | 53.35 | x | x | | | | 53.35 | |
| | Hannes Kirchler | Italy | x | x | x | | | | NM | |

=== Hammer throw ===
July 1

| Rank | Name | Nationality | #1 | #2 | #3 | #4 | #5 | #6 | Result | Notes |
|---|---|---|---|---|---|---|---|---|---|---|
| 1st place, gold medalist(s) | Eşref Apak | Turkey | 74.37 | x | 76.05 | 77.88 | 77.44 | 77.21 | 77.88 | |
| 2nd place, silver medalist(s) | Alexandros Papadimitriou | Greece | x | x | 75.15 | 75.57 | x | 73.46 | 75.57 | |
| 3rd place, bronze medalist(s) | Nicolas Figère | France | x | 75.30 | x | x | 73.60 | 71.96 | 75.30 | SB |
| 4 | Nicola Vizzoni | Italy | 71.59 | 72.74 | 73.64 | x | 72.46 | 72.62 | 73.64 | |
| 5 | András Haklits | Croatia | 73.08 | 71.10 | x | x | x | 72.24 | 73.08 | |
| 6 | Marco Lingua | Italy | 67.35 | 72.60 | x | x | x | x | 72.60 | |
| 7 | Saber Souid | Tunisia | x | 70.08 | x | 69.72 | x | 69.73 | 70.08 | |
| 8 | Mohsen El Anany | Egypt | 69.29 | 67.04 | 66.63 | 67.45 | 69.83 | 66.56 | 69.83 | |
| 9 | Moisés Campeny | Spain | 66.90 | x | 68.04 | | | | 68.04 | |
| 10 | Matko Tešija | Croatia | 66.48 | 67.32 | 63.68 | | | | 67.32 | |

=== Javelin throw ===
June 29

| Rank | Name | Nationality | #1 | #2 | #3 | #4 | #5 | #6 | Result | Notes |
|---|---|---|---|---|---|---|---|---|---|---|
| 1st place, gold medalist(s) | Vitolio Tipotio | France | 65.93 | 70.10 | 71.82 | x | x | 75.20 | 75.20 | |
| 2nd place, silver medalist(s) | Francesco Pignata | Italy | 71.92 | 68.14 | 74.51 | 71.41 | x | 72.93 | 74.51 | |
| 3rd place, bronze medalist(s) | Firas Zaal Al-Mohammed | Syria | 67.07 | 73.49 | 68.51 | 66.51 | 69.49 | x | 73.49 | |
| 4 | Eleftherios Karasmanakis | Greece | 71.71 | 69.54 | 71.75 | x | 70.88 | 71.17 | 71.75 | |
| 5 | Gustavo Dacal | Spain | 67.53 | x | 69.09 | x | x | x | 69.09 | |
| 6 | Edi Ponoš | Croatia | 66.74 | 67.91 | 66.74 | 64.75 | x | x | 67.91 | |

=== Decathlon ===
June 29–30

The highest mark recorded in each event is highlighted in yellow

| Rank | Athlete | Nationality | 100m | LJ | SP | HJ | 400m | 110m H | DT | PV | JT | 1500m | Points | Notes |
|---|---|---|---|---|---|---|---|---|---|---|---|---|---|---|
| 1st place, gold medalist(s) | Romain Barras | France | 11.40 | 7.19 | 14.76 | 1.96 | 48.84 | 14.35 | 42.22 | 4.90 | 64.67 | 4:28.48 | 8127 | |
| 2nd place, silver medalist(s) | Rudy Bourguignon | France | 11.23 | 7.20 | 15.29 | 1.93 | 49.77 | 15.50 | 42.45 | 5.00 | 60.95 | 4:40.99 | 7886 | |
| 3rd place, bronze medalist(s) | Hamdi Dhouibi | Tunisia | 11.03 | 7.48 | 12.82 | 1.99 | 47.46 | 14.57 | 30.30 | 5.00 | 50.25 | 4:21.15 | 7847 | |
| 4 | Óscar González | Spain | 11.26 | 7.50 | 12.86 | 2.08 | 49.06 | 14.78 | 40.43 | 4.50 | 50.18 | 4:22.12 | 7831 | SB |
| 5 | Víctor Ruiz | Spain | 11.23 | 7.00 | 12.89 | 1.90 | 49.00 | 14.72 | 41.91 | 4.50 | 54.25 | 4:26.02 | 7630 | PB |
| 6 | Hakim Alaoui | Morocco | 11.76 | 7.10 | 11.57 | 2.08 | 50.89 | 15.49 | 33.82 | 4.10 | 51.14 | 4:21.94 | 7148 | SB |

== Women's results ==
=== 100 meters ===
Heats – June 30
Wind:
Heat 1: +0.4 m/s, Heat 2: +0.1 m/s

| Rank | Heat | Name | Nationality | Time | Notes |
|---|---|---|---|---|---|
| 1 | 1 | Véronique Mang | France | 11.52 | Q |
| 2 | 1 | Vukosava Đapić | Serbia and Montenegro | 11.59 | Q |
| 3 | 2 | Sylviane Félix | France | 11.62 | Q, F1 |
| 4 | 1 | Kristina Žumer | Slovenia | 11.79 | Q |
| 5 | 2 | Belén Recio | Spain | 11.82 | Q, SB |
| 6 | 1 | Eleni Artymata | Cyprus | 11.89 | q |
| 7 | 1 | Daniela Bellanova | Italy | 11.94 | q |
| 8 | 2 | Marilia Gregoriou | Cyprus | 11.95 | Q |
| 9 | 2 | Elena Sordelli | Italy | 11.96 | |
| 10 | 1 | Cristina Sanz | Spain | 12.02 | |
| 11 | 1 | Eleftheria Kompidou | Greece | 12.08 | |
| 12 | 2 | Athina Kopsia | Greece | 12.09 | |
| 13 | 2 | Saliha Memiş | Turkey | 12.09 | |
| | 2 | Alenka Bikar | Slovenia | DNS | |

Final – June 30
Wind:
+0.5 m/s

| Rank | Lane | Name | Nationality | Time | Notes |
|---|---|---|---|---|---|
| 1st place, gold medalist(s) | 5 | Véronique Mang | France | 11.44 | |
| 2nd place, silver medalist(s) | 6 | Sylviane Félix | France | 11.46 | |
| 3rd place, bronze medalist(s) | 7 | Kristina Žumer | Slovenia | 11.63 | SB |
| 4 | 3 | Belén Recio | Spain | 11.74 | SB |
| 5 | 8 | Eleni Artymata | Cyprus | 11.76 | |
| 6 | 1 | Marilia Gregoriou | Cyprus | 11.84 | |
| 7 | 2 | Daniela Bellanova | Italy | 11.85 | |
| | 4 | Vukosava Đapić | Serbia and Montenegro | DQ | |

=== 200 meters ===
Heats – June 29
Wind:
Heat 1: -1.4 m/s, Heat 2: -0.5 m/s

| Rank | Heat | Name | Nationality | Time | Notes |
|---|---|---|---|---|---|
| 1 | 1 | Alenka Bikar | Slovenia | 23.69 | Q, SB |
| 2 | 1 | Fabe Dia | France | 23.72 | Q |
| 3 | 2 | Marilia Gregoriou | Cyprus | 23.73 | Q, SB |
| 4 | 2 | Kristina Žumer | Slovenia | 23.89 | Q |
| 5 | 2 | Lina Jacques | France | 23.92 | Q |
| 6 | 1 | Eleni Artymata | Cyprus | 23.94 | Q |
| 7 | 2 | Julia Alba | Spain | 24.12 | q |
| 8 | 2 | Marina Vasarmidou | Greece | 24.19 | q |
| 9 | 1 | Birsen Bekgöz | Turkey | 24.33 | |
| 10 | 1 | Manuela Grillo | Italy | 24.47 | |
| 11 | 1 | Cristina Sanz | Spain | 24.51 | |
| 12 | 2 | Doris Tomasini | Italy | 24.53 | SB |
| 13 | 1 | Athanasia Efstratiadou | Greece | 24.58 | |

Final – June 29
Wind:
-1.9 m/s

| Rank | Lane | Name | Nationality | Time | Notes |
|---|---|---|---|---|---|
| 1st place, gold medalist(s) | 6 | Alenka Bikar | Slovenia | 23.65 | SB |
| 2nd place, silver medalist(s) | 2 | Lina Jacques | France | 23.75 | PB |
| 3rd place, bronze medalist(s) | 3 | Fabe Dia | France | 23.78 | |
| 4 | 7 | Eleni Artymata | Cyprus | 23.82 | |
| 5 | 5 | Kristina Žumer | Slovenia | 23.93 | |
| 6 | 1 | Julia Alba | Spain | 24.25 | |
| 7 | 8 | Marina Vasarmidou | Greece | 24.33 | F1 |
| 8 | 4 | Marilia Gregoriou | Cyprus | 24.35 | |

=== 400 meters ===
July 1

| Rank | Lane | Name | Nationality | Time | Notes |
|---|---|---|---|---|---|
| 1st place, gold medalist(s) | 6 | Dimitra Dova | Greece | 52.67 | |
| 2nd place, silver medalist(s) | 8 | Phara Anacharsis | France | 52.70 | PB |
| 3rd place, bronze medalist(s) | 2 | Klodiana Shala | Albania | 53.23 | PB |
| 4 | 7 | Mayte Martínez | Spain | 53.73 | SB |
| 5 | 4 | Daniela Graglia | Italy | 54.18 | |
| 6 | 1 | Hanane Skhyi | Morocco | 54.24 | |
| 7 | 3 | Pınar Saka | Turkey | 54.75 | |
| 8 | 5 | Daisy Antonio | Spain | 55.00 | SB |

=== 800 meters ===
Heats – June 30

| Rank | Heat | Name | Nationality | Time | Notes |
|---|---|---|---|---|---|
| 1 | 1 | Élisabeth Grousselle | France | 2:03.81 | Q |
| 2 | 1 | Binnaz Uslu | Turkey | 2:03.86 | Q, SB |
| 3 | 1 | Amina Aït Hammou | Morocco | 2:04.23 | Q |
| 4 | 1 | Esther Desviat | Spain | 2:04.78 | q |
| 5 | 1 | Elisa Cusma | Italy | 2:05.76 | q |
| 6 | 2 | Laetitia Valdonado | France | 2:06.18 | Q |
| 7 | 2 | Brigita Langerholc | Slovenia | 2:06.77 | Q |
| 8 | 2 | Alexia Oberstolz | Italy | 2:06.84 | Q |
| 9 | 2 | Miriam Bravo | Spain | 2:07.49 | |
| | 2 | Marina Munćan | Serbia and Montenegro | DNF | |

Final – July 1

| Rank | Name | Nationality | Time | Notes |
|---|---|---|---|---|
| 1st place, gold medalist(s) | Laetitia Valdonado | France | 2:01.71 | |
| 2nd place, silver medalist(s) | Élisabeth Grousselle | France | 2:02.47 | |
| 3rd place, bronze medalist(s) | Binnaz Uslu | Turkey | 2:02.68 | SB |
| 4 | Brigita Langerholc | Slovenia | 2:03.23 | |
| 5 | Alexia Oberstolz | Italy | 2:03.55 | |
| 6 | Esther Desviat | Spain | 2:03.75 | |
| 7 | Elisa Cusma | Italy | 2:03.96 | |
| 8 | Amina Aït Hammou | Morocco | 2:04.67 | |

=== 1500 meters ===
July 2

| Rank | Name | Nationality | Time | Notes |
|---|---|---|---|---|
| 1st place, gold medalist(s) | Fatima Lanouar | Tunisia | 4:10.77 | SB |
| 2nd place, silver medalist(s) | Sonja Stolić | Serbia and Montenegro | 4:10.92 | PB |
| 3rd place, bronze medalist(s) | Nuria Fernández | Spain | 4:11.20 | SB |
| 4 | Mariem Alaoui Selsouli | Morocco | 4:11.83 | |
| 5 | Konstadina Efedaki | Greece | 4:12.47 | |
| 6 | Eleonora Berlanda | Italy | 4:12.59 | |
| 7 | Irene Alfonso | Spain | 4:13.07 | |
| 8 | Latifa Essarokh | France | 4:13.44 | |
| 9 | Marina Munćan | Serbia and Montenegro | 4:15.56 | SB |
| 10 | Angela Rinicella | Italy | 4:16.09 | |
| 11 | Julie Coulaud | France | 4:16.60 | |
| 12 | Chahrazad Cheboube | Algeria | 4:16.76 | PB |
| 13 | Safa Issaoui | Tunisia | 4:18.21 | |
| 14 | Sonja Roman | Slovenia | 4:19.67 | |
| 15 | Fatima Bahi Azzouhoum | Algeria | 4:20.55 | |
| | Hasna Benhassi | Morocco | DNS | |

=== 5000 meters ===
June 30

| Rank | Name | Nationality | Time | Notes |
|---|---|---|---|---|
| 1st place, gold medalist(s) | Margaret Maury | France | 15:22.59 | SB |
| 2nd place, silver medalist(s) | Asmae Leghzaoui | Morocco | 15:23.30 | |
| 3rd place, bronze medalist(s) | Silvia Weissteiner | Italy | 15:28.55 | PB |
| 4 | Souad Aït Salem | Algeria | 15:31.34 | |
| 5 | Sonia Bejarano | Spain | 15:37.08 | PB |
| 6 | Fatiha Kililech-Fauvel | France | 15:44.34 | PB |
| | Malika Asahssah | Morocco | DNF | |

=== 10,000 meters ===
June 29

| Rank | Name | Nationality | Time | Notes |
|---|---|---|---|---|
| 1st place, gold medalist(s) | Souad Aït Salem | Algeria | 32:55.48 | |
| 2nd place, silver medalist(s) | Asmae Leghzaoui | Morocco | 32:59.24 | |
| 3rd place, bronze medalist(s) | Olivera Jevtić | Serbia and Montenegro | 33:30.34 | |
| 4 | Patrizia Tisi | Italy | 33:32.22 | |
| 5 | Christelle Daunay | France | 33:45.80 | |
| 6 | Vincenza Sicari | Italy | 33:53.17 | |
| 7 | Dolores Pulido | Spain | 34:06.77 | |

=== Half marathon ===
July 2

| Rank | Name | Nationality | Time | Notes |
|---|---|---|---|---|
| 1st place, gold medalist(s) | Zhor El Kamch | Morocco | 1:13:50 | |
| 2nd place, silver medalist(s) | Rosaria Console | Italy | 1:15:40 | |
| 3rd place, bronze medalist(s) | Olivera Jevtić | Serbia and Montenegro | 1:16:32 | |
| 4 | Deborah Toniolo | Italy | 1:17:12 | |
| 5 | Türkan Bozkurt Erişmiş | Turkey | 1:17:56 | |
| 6 | Hafida Narmouch | Morocco | 1:18:32 | |
| 7 | Fatima Ayachi | Morocco | 1:18:55 | |
| 8 | Marta Fernández | Spain | 1:19:02 | |
| 9 | María José Pueyo | Spain | 1:19:28 | |
| 10 | Carol Galea | Malta | 1:21:04 | |
| 11 | Magdalini Gazea | Greece | 1:22:21 | |
| 12 | Inmaculada Castillo | Spain | 1:22:56 | |
| 13 | Ana María Medina | Spain | 1:24:16 | |
| 14 | María García | Spain | 1:27:33 | |
| | Beatriz Jiménez | Spain | DNF | |
| | Teresa Pulido | Spain | DNF | |
| | Zahia Dahmani | France | DNF | |
| | Souad Aït Salem | Algeria | DNS | |

=== 100 meters hurdles ===
Heats – June 30
Wind:
Heat 1: -1.7 m/s, Heat 2: -0.5 m/s

| Rank | Heat | Name | Nationality | Time | Notes |
|---|---|---|---|---|---|
| 1 | 2 | Glory Alozie | Spain | 13.00 | Q |
| 2 | 2 | Reïna-Flor Okori | France | 13.21 | Q, F1 |
| 3 | 1 | Flora Redoumi | Greece | 13.32 | Q |
| 4 | 1 | Adrianna Lamalle | France | 13.34 | Q |
| 5 | 1 | Aliuska López | Spain | 13.53 | Q |
| 6 | 2 | Micol Cattaneo | Italy | 13.61 | Q |
| 7 | 1 | Esen Kizildag | Turkey | 14.07 | q |
| 8 | 2 | Naima Bentahar | Algeria | 14.10 | q |
| 9 | 2 | Evmorfia Baourda | Cyprus | 14.26 | |

Final – June 30
Wind:
-0.9 m/s

| Rank | Lane | Name | Nationality | Time | Notes |
|---|---|---|---|---|---|
| 1st place, gold medalist(s) | 4 | Glory Alozie | Spain | 12.90 | |
| 2nd place, silver medalist(s) | 3 | Adrianna Lamalle | France | 12.99 | PB |
| 3rd place, bronze medalist(s) | 6 | Flora Redoumi | Greece | 13.16 | |
| 4 | 5 | Reïna-Flor Okori | France | 13.20 | |
| 5 | 2 | Aliuska López | Spain | 13.51 | |
| 6 | 8 | Naima Bentahar | Algeria | 13.95 | F1 |
| 7 | 1 | Esen Kizildag | Turkey | 13.97 | |
| | 7 | Micol Cattaneo | Italy | DQ | F2 |

=== 400 meters hurdles ===
Heats – June 29

| Rank | Heat | Name | Nationality | Time | Notes |
|---|---|---|---|---|---|
| 1 | 1 | Cora Olivero | Spain | 55.27 | Q, PB |
| 2 | 2 | Monika Niederstätter | Italy | 56.16 | Q |
| 3 | 2 | Sylvanie Morandais | France | 56.23 | Q |
| 4 | 1 | Benedetta Ceccarelli | Italy | 56.44 | Q, SB |
| 5 | 1 | Klodiana Shala | Albania | 56.48 | Q, NR |
| 6 | 1 | Christina Chantzi-Neag | Greece | 57.15 | q |
| 7 | 2 | Houria Moussa | Algeria | 57.53 | Q |
| 8 | 1 | Meta Mačus | Slovenia | 57.64 | q, SB |
| 9 | 2 | Laia Forcadell | Spain | 57.78 | SB |
| 10 | 2 | Sara Orešnik | Slovenia | 57.84 | PB |
| 11 | 1 | Özge Gürler | Turkey | 58.24 | |
| 12 | 1 | Hanane Skhyi | Morocco | 58.88 | |
| 13 | 2 | Zahra Lachguer | Morocco | 58.92 | |
| 14 | 2 | Birsen Bekgöz | Turkey | 59.03 | |
| 15 | 1 | Olivia Abderrhamanne | France | 59.27 | |

Final – June 30

| Rank | Lane | Name | Nationality | Time | Notes |
|---|---|---|---|---|---|
| 1st place, gold medalist(s) | 6 | Benedetta Ceccarelli | Italy | 55.76 | SB |
| 2nd place, silver medalist(s) | 3 | Cora Olivero | Spain | 55.85 | |
| 3rd place, bronze medalist(s) | 4 | Monika Niederstätter | Italy | 56.38 | |
| 4 | 2 | Klodiana Shala | Albania | 56.48 | =NR |
| 5 | 8 | Christina Chantzi-Neag | Greece | 57.14 | F1 |
| 6 | 5 | Sylvanie Morandais | France | 57.15 | |
| 7 | 7 | Meta Mačus | Slovenia | 57.61 | SB |
| 8 | 1 | Houria Moussa | Algeria | 57.99 | |

=== 4 × 100 meters relay ===
July 1

| Rank | Lane | Nation | Competitors | Time | Notes |
|---|---|---|---|---|---|
| 1st place, gold medalist(s) | 6 | France | Véronique Mang, Lina Jacques, Fabe Dia, Carima Louami | 43.75 | |
| 2nd place, silver medalist(s) | 4 | Spain | Carmen Blay, Belén Recio, Cristina Sanz, Glory Alozie | 44.47 | |
| 3rd place, bronze medalist(s) | 7 | Italy | Elena Sordelli, Daniela Bellanova, Manuela Grillo, Doris Tomasini | 45.18 | |
| 4 | 5 | Greece | Flora Redoumi, Eleftheria Kompidou, Athanasia Efstratiadou, Marina Vasarmidou | 45.33 | |
| 5 | 8 | Cyprus | Melini Hadjitheori, Evmorfia Baourda, Eleni Artymata, Marilia Gregoriou | 45.75 | |
| 6 | 3 | Turkey | Özge Gürler, Birsen Bekgöz, Pınar Saka, Saliha Memiş | 45.93 | |

=== 4 × 400 meters relay ===
July 2

| Rank | Nation | Competitors | Time | Notes |
|---|---|---|---|---|
| 1st place, gold medalist(s) | Spain | Julia Alba, Belén Recio, Cora Olivero, Mayte Martínez | 3:31.45 | |
| 2nd place, silver medalist(s) | France | Phara Anacharsis, Laetitia Valdonado, Olivia Abderrhamanne, Élisabeth Grousselle | 3:31.86 | |
| 3rd place, bronze medalist(s) | Turkey | Özge Gürler, Birsen Bekgöz, Binnaz Uslu, Pınar Saka | 3:40.75 | |
| | Morocco | | DNS | |

=== 20 kilometers walk ===
June 30

| Rank | Name | Nationality | Time | Notes |
|---|---|---|---|---|
| 1st place, gold medalist(s) | Elisa Rigaudo | Italy | 1:32:44 | GB |
| 2nd place, silver medalist(s) | María Vasco | Spain | 1:34:28 | |
| 3rd place, bronze medalist(s) | Beatriz Pascual | Spain | 1:36:27 | |
| 4 | Rocío Florido | Spain | 1:37:23 | |
| 5 | Evangelia Xinou | Greece | 1:39:50 | |
| 6 | Teresa Linares | Spain | 1:41:30 | |
| 7 | Fatiha Ouali | France | 1:41:44 | |
| 8 | Carmen Bone | Spain | 1:43:47 | |
| | Ainhoa Pinedo | Spain | DNF | |
| | Yeliz Ay | Turkey | DNF | |
| | Bahia Boussad | Algeria | DQ | |

=== High jump ===
July 2

| Rank | Name | Nationality | 1.78 | 1.82 | 1.86 | 1.89 | 1.92 | 1.95 | 1.97 | 2.01 | Result | Notes |
|---|---|---|---|---|---|---|---|---|---|---|---|---|
| 1st place, gold medalist(s) | Ruth Beitia | Spain | – | o | – | o | o | o | xx– | x | 1.95 | SB |
| 2nd place, silver medalist(s) | Melanie Skotnik | France | – | o | o | xo | xxo | xxo | xxx | | 1.95 | |
| 3rd place, bronze medalist(s) | Marta Mendía | Spain | o | o | xxo | o | xxx | | | | 1.89 | |
| 4 | Maroula Papageorgiou | Greece | o | o | o | xxx | | | | | 1.86 | |
| 5 | Candeğer Kılınçer Oğuz | Turkey | o | xo | xxx | | | | | | 1.82 | |

=== Pole vault ===
June 29

| Rank | Name | Nationality | 3.60 | 3.80 | 4.00 | 4.15 | 4.25 | 4.30 | 4.35 | 4.40 | Result | Notes |
|---|---|---|---|---|---|---|---|---|---|---|---|---|
| 1st place, gold medalist(s) | Vanessa Boslak | France | – | – | o | xo | x– | xo | – | o | 4.40 | GR |
| 2nd place, silver medalist(s) | Anna Fitídou | Cyprus | – | o | o | xo | o | xx– | x | | 4.25 | |
| 3rd place, bronze medalist(s) | Afroditi Skafida | Greece | – | o | o | o | xxx | | | | 4.15 | |
| 4 | Teja Melink | Slovenia | – | o | o | xxo | xxx | | | | 4.15 | |
| 5 | Mar Sánchez | Spain | xo | xo | o | xxx | | | | | 4.00 | |
| 6 | Aurore Pignot | France | – | o | xo | xxx | | | | | 4.00 | |
| 7 | Dana Cervantes | Spain | – | xo | xxx | | | | | | 3.80 | |
| 8 | Ivona Jerković | Croatia | o | xxx | | | | | | | 3.60 | |
| 8 | Nisrine Dinar | Morocco | o | xxx | | | | | | | 3.60 | |

=== Long jump ===
June 30

| Rank | Name | Nationality | #1 | #2 | #3 | #4 | #5 | #6 | Result | Notes |
|---|---|---|---|---|---|---|---|---|---|---|
| 1st place, gold medalist(s) | Fiona May | Italy | 6.49 | 6.64 | x | 6.56 | x | x | 6.64 | SB |
| 2nd place, silver medalist(s) | Niurka Montalvo | Spain | 6.28 | 6.53 | x | x | 6.55 | 6.41 | 6.55 | SB |
| 3rd place, bronze medalist(s) | Concepción Montaner | Spain | x | 6.49 | x | x | 6.26 | x | 6.49 | SB |
| 4 | Ilaria Beltrami | Italy | 6.19 | 6.25 | 6.26 | 6.31 | 6.30 | x | 6.31 | |
| 5 | Panagiota Koutsioumari | Greece | x | x | 5.87 | x | 6.31 | 6.29 | 6.31 | |
| 6 | Snežana Vukmirović | Slovenia | 6.21 | x | x | x | x | 6.24 | 6.24 | |
| 7 | Irene Charalambous | Cyprus | 5.82 | 6.09 | 6.22 | 6.10 | x | x | 6.22 | |
| 8 | Petra Karanikić | Croatia | 6.09 | x | 6.20 | 5.92 | 5.90 | 6.16 | 6.20 | |
| 9 | Latifa Ezziraoui | Morocco | x | x | 5.76 | | | | 5.76 | |
| | Baya Rahouli | Algeria | x | – | – | | | | DNF | |

=== Triple jump ===
July 1

| Rank | Name | Nationality | #1 | #2 | #3 | #4 | #5 | #6 | Result | Notes |
|---|---|---|---|---|---|---|---|---|---|---|
| 1st place, gold medalist(s) | Baya Rahouli | Algeria | 14.28 | 14.88 | 14.98 | 14.76 | x | x | 14.98 | GR, NR |
| 2nd place, silver medalist(s) | Carlota Castrejana | Spain | x | 14.27 | x | 13.94 | x | 14.60 | 14.60 | NR |
| 3rd place, bronze medalist(s) | Hrysopiyi Devetzi | Greece | x | x | 14.23 | 14.33 | 13.86 | x | 14.33 | |
| 4 | Snežana Vukmirović | Slovenia | 13.90 | x | 14.08 | 13.79 | 13.51 | x | 14.08 | PB |
| 5 | Amy Zongo | France | x | 13.63 | 13.79 | x | x | x | 13.79 | |
| 6 | Betty Lise | France | 13.78 | 13.48 | x | x | x | 13.55 | 13.78 | |
| 7 | Silvia Biondini | Italy | 13.52 | 13.77 | 13.65 | x | x | 13.45 | 13.77 | |
| 8 | Patricia Sarrapio | Spain | 13.18 | 13.53 | x | x | x | x | 13.53 | SB |
| 9 | Latifa Ezziraoui | Morocco | x | x | 13.04 | | | | 13.04 | |
| 10 | Maria Diekiti | Cyprus | x | 12.90 | 12.92 | | | | 12.92 | |

=== Shot put ===
June 30

| Rank | Name | Nationality | #1 | #2 | #3 | #4 | #5 | #6 | Result | Notes |
|---|---|---|---|---|---|---|---|---|---|---|
| 1st place, gold medalist(s) | Cristiana Checchi | Italy | x | 18.59 | x | x | x | x | 18.59 | GR |
| 2nd place, silver medalist(s) | Laurence Manfredi | France | 17.20 | 17.40 | 17.47 | 17.08 | 17.40 | 17.18 | 17.47 | SB |
| 3rd place, bronze medalist(s) | Chiara Rosa | Italy | x | x | 16.91 | x | x | 17.34 | 17.34 | |
| 4 | Martina de la Puente | Spain | 17.10 | x | 16.69 | x | x | 16.99 | 17.10 | |
| 5 | Filiz Kadoğan | Turkey | 16.41 | 16.25 | 15.93 | 16.45 | x | 16.10 | 16.45 | |

=== Discus throw ===
July 2

| Rank | Name | Nationality | #1 | #2 | #3 | #4 | #5 | #6 | Result | Notes |
|---|---|---|---|---|---|---|---|---|---|---|
| 1st place, gold medalist(s) | Dragana Tomašević | Serbia and Montenegro | 60.41 | 57.86 | 62.10 | 61.27 | x | x | 62.10 | |
| 2nd place, silver medalist(s) | Laura Bordignon | Italy | x | 57.98 | x | x | x | x | 57.98 | PB |
| 3rd place, bronze medalist(s) | Vera Begić | Croatia | 48.58 | x | x | 53.53 | 56.53 | x | 56.53 | |
| 4 | Giorgia Baratella | Italy | x | 48.90 | x | 51.84 | 54.18 | 52.06 | 54.18 | |
| 5 | Areti Abatzi | Greece | x | 53.39 | x | x | 51.97 | x | 53.39 | |
| 6 | Mélina Robert-Michon | France | 51.38 | 49.96 | x | x | 51.80 | 50.84 | 51.80 | |

=== Hammer throw ===
June 29

| Rank | Name | Nationality | #1 | #2 | #3 | #4 | #5 | #6 | Result | Notes |
|---|---|---|---|---|---|---|---|---|---|---|
| 1st place, gold medalist(s) | Ester Balassini | Italy | 71.17 | 70.21 | x | 68.19 | x | 68.79 | 71.17 | GR |
| 2nd place, silver medalist(s) | Clarissa Claretti | Italy | 67.20 | x | 67.66 | x | 69.24 | 66.85 | 69.24 | SB |
| 3rd place, bronze medalist(s) | Alexandra Papageorgiou | Greece | 65.06 | 67.13 | 66.50 | 61.87 | 66.07 | x | 67.13 | SB |
| 4 | Stiliani Papadopoulou | Greece | 56.67 | 63.64 | x | x | 66.95 | x | 66.95 | |
| 5 | Berta Castells | Spain | x | 65.34 | 63.81 | x | 66.02 | x | 66.02 | |
| 6 | Amélie Perrin | France | 64.43 | x | x | 61.57 | x | 64.88 | 64.88 | |
| 7 | Ivana Brkljačić | Croatia | 63.66 | 64.29 | 63.20 | x | 62.76 | 63.67 | 64.29 | |
| 8 | Olivia Waldet | France | x | 63.20 | x | 64.27 | 58.52 | 59.90 | 64.27 | |
| 9 | Sanja Gavrilović | Croatia | 62.58 | x | 62.58 | | | | 62.58 | |
| 10 | Marwa Hussein | Egypt | 61.61 | 62.53 | x | | | | 62.53 | |
| 11 | Dolores Pedrares | Spain | x | x | 61.48 | | | | 61.48 | |
| 12 | Hayat El Ghazi | Morocco | 58.57 | x | 59.46 | | | | 59.46 | |
| 13 | Mouna Dani | Morocco | 54.65 | 53.73 | 55.51 | | | | 55.51 | |

=== Javelin throw ===
July 1

| Rank | Name | Nationality | #1 | #2 | #3 | #4 | #5 | #6 | Result | Notes |
|---|---|---|---|---|---|---|---|---|---|---|
| 1st place, gold medalist(s) | Aggeliki Tsiolakoudi | Greece | x | x | 56.74 | 62.61 | 61.24 | x | 62.61 | GR |
| 2nd place, silver medalist(s) | Zahra Bani | Italy | 53.31 | 58.82 | 55.24 | 57.53 | x | 62.36 | 62.36 | |
| 3rd place, bronze medalist(s) | Mercedes Chilla | Spain | 57.69 | 57.17 | x | x | x | x | 57.69 | |
| 4 | Aïda Sellam | Tunisia | 53.76 | 53.39 | 54.19 | 53.18 | 52.98 | 53.73 | 54.19 | |
| 5 | Sarah Walter | France | 53.33 | 53.34 | x | 52.75 | 52.74 | 53.61 | 53.61 | |
| 6 | Claudia Coslovich | Italy | 50.57 | x | 51.10 | x | x | x | 51.10 | |
| 7 | Ivana Vuković | Croatia | 47.95 | 48.08 | 45.22 | x | 47.85 | 48.85 | 48.85 | |

=== Heptathlon ===
July 1–2

The highest mark recorded in each event is highlighted in yellow

| Rank | Athlete | Nationality | 100m H | HJ | SP | 200m | LJ | JT | 800m | Points | Notes |
|---|---|---|---|---|---|---|---|---|---|---|---|
| 1st place, gold medalist(s) | Marie Collonvillé | France | 13.96 | 1.79 | 11.88 | 25.23 | 6.19 | 43.64 | 2:14.29 | 6017 | |
| 2nd place, silver medalist(s) | Argyro Strataki | Greece | 14.04 | 1.76 | 13.47 | 25.00 | 5.85 | 43.51 | 2:17.53 | 5943 | SB |
| 3rd place, bronze medalist(s) | Anzhela Atroshchenko | Turkey | 14.15 | 1.70 | 13.22 | 25.26 | 6.17 | 40.73 | 2:16.61 | 5870 | |
| 4 | Julie Martin | France | 14.70 | 1.76 | 11.96 | 25.64 | 5.97 | 43.67 | 2:16.06 | 5753 | |
| 5 | Sarah Bouaoudia | Algeria | 14.04 | 1.85 | 9.12 | 24.85 | 6.18 | 30.84 | 2:14.03 | 5691 | PB |
| 6 | María Peinado | Spain | 14.16 | 1.67 | 12.37 | 25.92 | 6.04 | 37.00 | 2:18.87 | 5575 | SB |
| 7 | Ana Capdevila | Spain | 14.70 | 1.67 | 10.75 | 25.70 | 5.67 | 35.35 | 2:17.55 | 5288 | |
