= 2005 European Cup (athletics) =

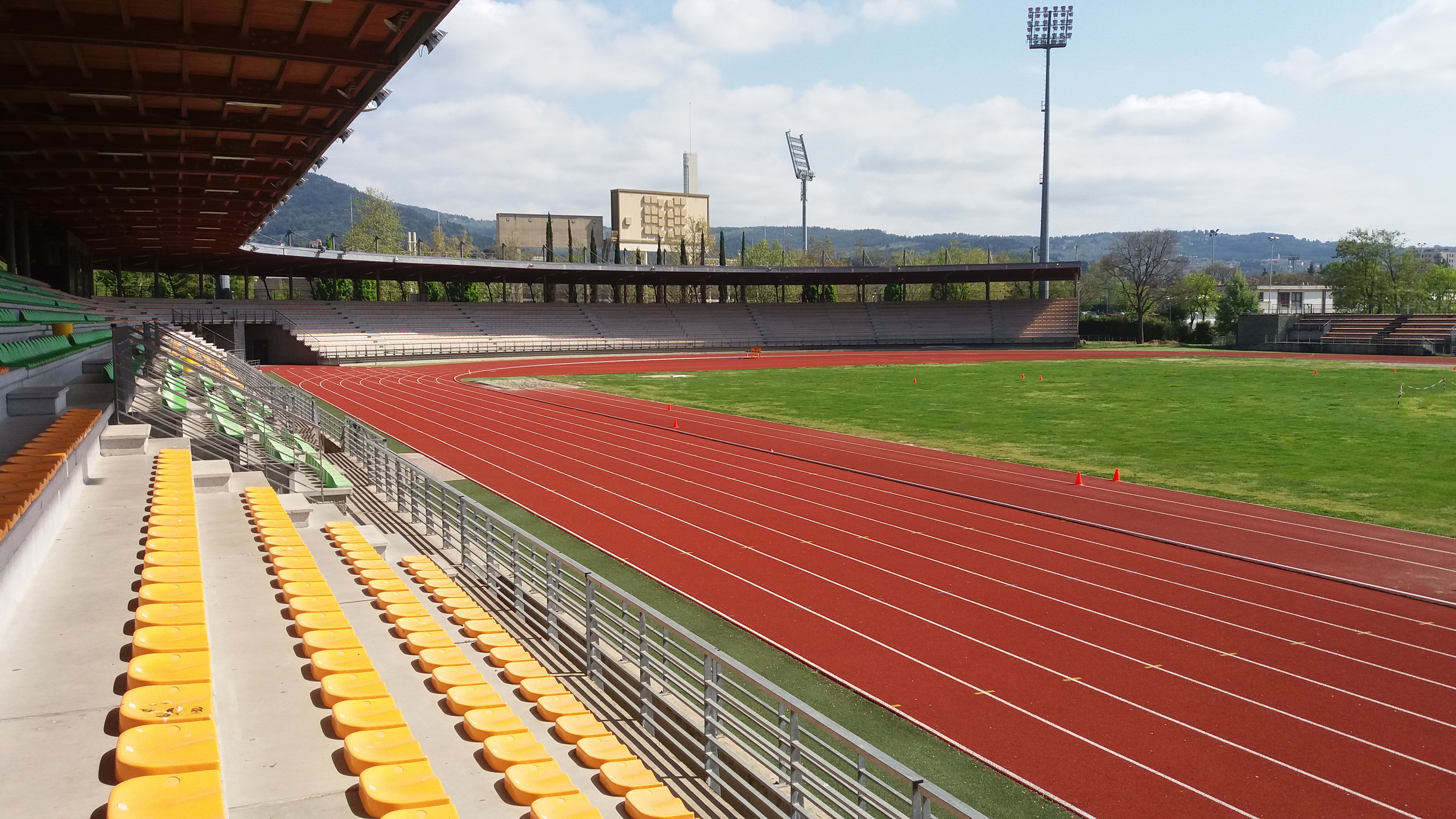
- Dates: 17–18 June (Super Leagues); 18–19 June (First & Second Leagues)
- Host city: Florence, Italy
- Venue: Stadio Luigi Ridolfi
- Level: Senior
- Type: Outdoor
- Events: 40

The 2005 European Cup was the 26th edition of the European Cup of athletics.

The Super League Finals were held in Florence, Italy from 17 to 19 June, like two years before the 2003 European Cup.

== Super League ==
=== Team standings ===
Men
Pos.	Nation	Points
1	Germany	113
2	France	104
3	Italy	98
4	Poland	94.5
5	Russia	88
6	Spain	86.5
7	Great Britain	70
8	Czech Republic	63

Women
Pos.	Nation	Points
1	Russia	131.5
2	Poland	94
3	Germany	93
4	France	90.5
5	Ukraine	86
6	Romania	85
7	Italy	77
8	Greece	62

Top six teams qualified for the 2006 European Indoor Cup.

=== Results summary ===
==== Men's events ====
Event	Gold		Silver		Bronze	
100 m (Wind: +2.1 m/s)	Ronald Pognon; France	10.06w	Mark Lewis-Francis; Great Britain	10.10w	Simone Collio; Italy	10.15w
200 m (Wind: -0.6 m/s)	Christian Malcolm; Great Britain	20.15	Tobias Unger; Germany	20.36	Jirí Vojtík; Czech Republic	20.66
400 m	Marc Raquil; France	45.80	Simon Kirch; Germany	45.86	Andrey Rudnitskiy; Russia	46.06
800 m	Antonio Manuel Reina; Spain	1:46.11	Grzegorz Krzosek; Poland	1:46.52	Dmitriy Bogdanov; Russia	1:46.79
1500 m	Juan Carlos Higuero; Spain	3:41.72	Mounir Yemmouni; France	3:42.10	Paweł Czapiewski; Poland	3:42.19
3000 m	Jesús España; Spain	8:16.48	Mo Farah; Great Britain	8:17.28	Yared Shegumo; Poland	8:18.06
5000 m	Juan Carlos de la Ossa; Spain	13:30.97	Bouabdellah Tahri; France	13:32.34	Jan Fitschen; Germany	13:33.46
3000 m steeplechase	Antonio Jiménez; Spain	8:20.17	Radosław Popławski; Poland	8:20.48	Vincent Le Dauphin; France	8:22.03
110 m hurdles (Wind: +2.0 m/s)	Ladji Doucouré; France	13.16	Thomas Blaschek; Germany	13.44	Andrea Giaconi; Italy	13.68
400 m hurdles	Naman Keïta; France	48.77	Marek Plawgo; Poland	48.99	Gianni Carabelli; Italy	49.04
4 × 100 m	Great Britain; Jason Gardener; Marlon Devonish; Christian Malcolm; Mark Lewis-Francis	38.67	Italy; Luca Verdecchia; Simone Collio; Marco Torrieri; Koura Kaba Fantoni	38.69	France; Lueyi Dovy; Ronald Pognon; Ladji Doucouré; Ydrissa M'Barke	38.78
4 × 400 m	Great Britain; Robert Tobin; Graham Hedman; Malachi Davis; Tim Benjamin	3:00.51	Poland; Piotr Klimczak; Marcin Marciniszyn; Robert Maćkowiak; Marek Plawgo	3:01.33	France; Abderhahim El Haouzy; Naman Keïta; Richard Maunier; Marc Raquil	3:01.65
High jump	Aleksey Dmitrik; Russia	2.30	Nicola Ciotti; Italy	2.30	Svatoslav Ton; Czech Republic	2.27
Pole vault	Giuseppe Gibilisco; Italy	5.80	Adam Ptácek; Czech Republic	5.60	Yevgeniy Mikhailichenko; Russia	5.50
Long jump	Nils Winter; Sweden	8.06	Salim Sdiri; France	8.05w	Vitaliy Shkurlatov; Russia	7.98
Triple jump	Charles Friedek; Germany	17.20	Danila Burkenya; Russia	17.06	Sébastien Pincemail; France	16.83
Shot put	Ralf Bartels; Germany	20.76	Manuel Martínez; Spain	20.28	Petr Stehlík; Czech Republic	20.24
Discus throw	Mario Pestano; Spain	66.29	Michael Möllenbeck; Germany	64.12	Diego Fortuna; Italy	61.06
Hammer throw	Szymon Ziółkowski; Poland	79.14	Ilya Konovalov; Russia	76.78	Markus Esser; Germany	76.11
Javelin throw	Mark Frank; Germany	82.38	Aleksandr Ivanov; Russia	81.96	Francesco Pignata; Italy	81.67
WR world record | AR area record | CR championship record | GR games record | NR national record | OR Olympic record | PB personal best | SB season best | WL world leading (in a given season)

==== Women's events ====
Event	Gold		Silver		Bronze	
100 m (Wind: 1.3 m/s)	Christine Arron; France	11.09	Olga Fyodorova; Russia	11.21	Maria Karastamati; Greece	11.30
200 m (Wind: -0.6 m/s)	Christine Arron; France	22.84	Yelena Bolsun; Russia	23.00	Marina Maydanova; Ukraine	23.01
400 m	Natalya Antyukh; Russia	50.67	Antonina Yefremova; Ukraine	51.56	Dimitra Dova; Greece	51.89
800 m	Maria Cioncan; Romania	2:00.88	Monika Gradzki; Germany	2:01.00	Svetlana Klyuka; Russia	2:01.02
1500 m	Yuliya Chizhenko; Russia	4:06.76	Maria Cioncan; Romania	4:07.39	Bouchra Ghezielle; France	4:08.02
3000 m	Yelena Zadorozhnaya; Russia	8:57.08	Maria Martins; France	9:00.71	Tatyana Krivobok; Ukraine	9:01.65
5000 m	Liliya Shobukhova; Russia	15:01.15	Wioletta Janowska; Poland	15:08.38	Mihaela Botezan; Romania	15:13.36
3000 m steeplechase	Cristina Casandra; Romania	9:35.95; CR	Lyubov Ivanova; Russia	9:46.63	Justyna Bąk; Poland	9:51.51
110 m hurdles (Wind: -1.3 m/s)	Linda Khodadin; France	12.73	Kirsten Bolm; Germany	12.79	Flora Rentoumi; Greece	13.03
400 m hurdles	Anna Jesień; Poland	54.90	Yekaterina Bikert; Russia	55.73	Claudia Marx; Germany	55.84
4 × 100 m	Russia; Olga Fyodorova; Yuliya Gushchina; Irina Khabarova; Yekaterina Kondratyeva	42.73	Germany; Katja Wakan; Esther Moller; Birgit Rockmeier; Verena Sailer	43.58	Italy; Elena Sordelli; Vincenza Calì; Manuela Grillo; Manuela Levorato	43.83
4 × 400 m	Russia; Yuliya Gushchina; Tatyana Levina; Mariya Lisnichenko; Natalya Antyukh	3:23.56	Poland; Zuzanna Radecka; Monika Bejnar; Grażyna Prokopek; Anna Jesień	3:24.61	Ukraine; Antonina Yefremova; Oksana Ilyushkina; Liliya Pilyuhina; Nataliya Pyhyda	3:26.72
High jump	Tatyana Kivimyagi; Russia	1.98	Vita Palamar; Ukraine	1.92	Melanie Skotnik; France	1.92
Pole vault	Anna Rogowska; Poland	4.60	Carolin Hingst; Germany	4.50	Natalya Kushch; Ukraine	4.30
Long jump	Irina Simagina; Russia	6.76	Fiona May; Italy	6.43	Adina Anton; Romania	6.35
Triple jump	Anna Pyatykh; Russia	14.72	Chrysopigi Devetzi; Greece	14.62	Magdelín Martínez; Italy	14.54w
Shot put	Olga Ryabinkin; Russia	19.65	Nadine Kleinert; Germany	18.89	Assunta Legnante; Italy	18.42
Discus throw	Franka Dietzsch; Germany	64.38	Yelena Antonova; Ukraine	62.59	Marzena Wysocka; Poland	62.28
Hammer throw	Kamila Skolimowska; Poland	72.38	Manuela Montebrun; France	71.10	Gulfiya Khanafeyeva; Russia	70.06
Javelin throw	Steffi Nerius; Germany	64.59	Barbara Madejczyk; Poland	61.72	Zahra Bani; Italy	61.66
WR world record | AR area record | CR championship record | GR games record | NR national record | OR Olympic record | PB personal best | SB season best | WL world leading (in a given season)

== First League ==
The First League was held on 18 and 19 June

=== Men ===
Group A
Held in Gävle, Sweden

Pos.	Nation	Points
1	Finland	120
2	Sweden	118
3	Switzerland	106
4	Hungary	99
5	Slovenia	79
6	Estonia	73
7	Croatia	69
8	Slovakia	54

Group B
Held in Leiria, Portugal

Pos.	Nation	Points
1	Ukraine	115
2	Greece	111
3	Netherlands	105
4	Portugal	102
5	Belgium	99
6	Romania	77
7	Ireland	65
8	Serbia and Montenegro	44

=== Women ===
Group A
Held in Gävle, Sweden

Pos.	Nation	Points
1	Sweden	134
2	Spain	131
3	Czech Republic	92
4	Finland	90
5	Hungary	87.5
6	Slovenia	69
7	Norway	64
8	Croatia	52.5

Group B
Held in Leiria, Portugal

Pos.	Nation	Points
1	Great Britain	134
2	Belarus	107.5
3	Belgium	90
4	Netherlands	85
5	Portugal	85
6	Bulgaria	83
7	Ireland	79
8	Serbia and Montenegro	53

The winner of each group also qualified for the 2006 European Indoor Cup.

== Second League ==
The Second League was held on 18 and 19 June

=== Men ===
Group A
Held in Tallinn, Estonia

Pos.	Nation	Points
1	Norway	127.5
2	Austria	109
3	Denmark	106
4	Lithuania	101
5	Israel	88.5
6	Latvia	88
7	Iceland	50
8	Luxembourg	40

Group B
Held in Istanbul, Turkey

Pos.	Nation	Points
1	Belarus	227
2	Turkey	225
3	Bulgaria	192
4	Moldova	171
5	Cyprus	167
6	Bosnia and Herzegovina	153
7	Azerbaijan	129
8	Georgia	104
9	Armenia	101
10	Andorra	97
11	AASSE	84
12	Albania	68
13	Macedonia	62

=== Women ===
Group A
Held in Tallinn, Estonia

Pos.	Nation	Points
1	Lithuania	110
2	Latvia	106
3	Estonia	103
4	Austria	101.5
5	Denmark	96.5
6	Slovakia	87
7	Israel	62
8	Iceland	51

Group B
Held in Istanbul, Turkey

Pos.	Nation	Points
1	Turkey	217
2	Switzerland	199
3	Cyprus	197
4	Moldova	176
5	Bosnia and Herzegovina	127
6	Albania	118
7	AASSE	117
8	Georgia	114.5
9	Armenia	98
10	Azerbaijan	71
11	Andorra	66.5
12	Macedonia	33
