= 2001 European Athletics U23 Championships – Men's 4 × 100 metres relay =

The men's 4 x 100 metres relay event at the 2001 European Athletics U23 Championships was held in Amsterdam, Netherlands, at Olympisch Stadion on 14 and 15 July.

== Medalists ==
| Gold | Tomasz Kondratowicz; Łukasz Chyła; Marcin Płacheta; Przemysław Rogowski; Poland |
| Silver | Jonathan O'Parka; Jonathan Barbour; Darren Chin; Ben Lewis; United Kingdom |
| Bronze | Matic Šušteršic; Matic Osovnikar; Boštjan Fridrih; Rok Orel; Slovenia |

== Results ==
=== Final ===
15 July

| Rank | Nation | Competitors | Time | Notes |
|---|---|---|---|---|
| 1st place, gold medalist(s) | Poland | Tomasz Kondratowicz; Łukasz Chyła; Marcin Płacheta; Przemysław Rogowski | 39.41 | |
| 2nd place, silver medalist(s) | United Kingdom | Jonathan O'Parka; Jonathan Barbour; Darren Chin; Ben Lewis | 39.45 | |
| 3rd place, bronze medalist(s) | Slovenia | Matic Šušteršic; Matic Osovnikar; Boštjan Fridrih; Rok Orel | 39.95 | |
| 4 | France | Yannick Urbino; Fabrice Calligny; Damien Degroote; Leslie Djhone | 40.02 | |
| 5 | Spain | Cecilio Maestra; Julián Martínez; Ángel David Rodríguez; Salvador Rodríguez | 40.22 | |
| | Italy | Massimiliano Dentali; Simone Collio; Massimiliano Donati; Alessandro Cavallaro | DNF | |
| | Switzerland | Guido Helfenstein; Marc Schneeberger; Marc Niederhäuser; Markus Lüthi | DNF | |
| | Germany | Tobias Pfennig; Steffen Otto; Tobias Unger; Oliver König | DQ | |

=== Heats ===
14 July
Qualified: first 3 in each heat and 2 best to the Final

==== Heat 1 ====
| Rank | Nation | Competitors | Time | Notes |
|---|---|---|---|---|
| 1 | Poland | Tomasz Kondratowicz; Łukasz Chyła; Marcin Płacheta; Przemysław Rogowski | 39.73 | Q |
| 2 | Germany | Tobias Pfennig; Steffen Otto; Tobias Unger; Oliver König | 39.78 | Q |
| 3 | France | Yannick Urbino; Fabrice Calligny; Sébastien Calpas; Leslie Djhone | 39.99 | Q |
| 4 | Italy | Massimiliano Dentali; Emanuele Di Gregorio; Massimiliano Donati; Alessandro Cavallaro | 40.07 | q |
| 5 | Switzerland | Guido Helfenstein; Marc Schneeberger; Marc Niederhäuser; Markus Lüthi | 40.92 | q |

==== Heat 2 ====
| Rank | Nation | Competitors | Time | Notes |
|---|---|---|---|---|
| 1 | United Kingdom | Jonathan O'Parka; James Chatt; Jonathan Barbour; Darren ChinBen Lewis | 39.90 | Q |
| 2 | Slovenia | Matic Šušteršic; Matic Osovnikar; Boštjan Fridrih; Rok Orel | 40.18 | Q |
| 3 | Spain | Cecilio Maestra; Julián Martínez; Ángel David Rodríguez; Alberto Dorrego | 41.05 | Q |
| | Sweden | Johan Hed; Christofer Sandin; Johan Engberg; Erik Wahn | DQ | |

== Participation ==
According to an unofficial count, 40 athletes from 9 countries participated in the event.

- France (5)
- Germany (4)
- Italy (5)
- Poland (4)
- Slovenia (4)
- Spain (5)
- Sweden (4)
- Switzerland (4)
- United Kingdom (5)
