= Julián Martínez =

Julián Martínez may refer to:

- Julian Martinez (1879–1943), San Ildefonso Pueblo potter, U.S. state of New Mexico
- Julián Martínez Soto (1921–2000) Spanish-born Mexican sculptor
- Julián Martínez (sprinter) (born 1980), Spanish sprinter
- Julián Martínez (footballer) (born 2003), Honduran footballer
- Julián Pedro Martínez (1889–1966), Argentine prelate of the Roman Catholic Church, bishop of Paraná

== See also ==
- Julia Martínez (born 1931), Spanish actress
