= Oliver Koenig =

German sprinter and long jumper (born 1981)

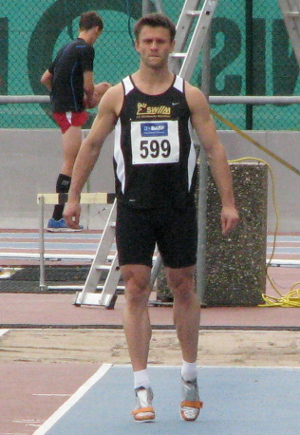
- Oliver Koenig at Mannheim DLV Competition 2011

Personal information
- Born: 31 January 1981 (age 45) Leipzig, West Germany

Sport
- Sport: Track and field

Oliver Koenig (born 31 January 1981) is a German sprinter and long jumper.

Koenig competed for the Iowa State Cyclones track and field team in the NCAA.

As a sprinter he finished eighth in the 200 metres in the 2002 IAAF World Cup. In the long jump he competed at the 2006 European Championships without reaching the final.

His personal best jump is 8.01 metres, achieved in June 2006 in Regensburg. He has 20.98 seconds in the 200 metres and 10.32 seconds in the 100 metres.

== Achievements ==
Year	Competition	Venue	Position	Event	Notes
Representing Germany
2001	European U23 Championships	Amsterdam, Netherlands	10th (h)	100m	10.64 (wind: 1.4 m/s)
2001	European U23 Championships	Amsterdam, Netherlands	2nd (h)	4 × 100 m relay	39.78
2006	European Championships	Gothenburg, Sweden	24th (q)	Long jump	7.36 m
