= 2001 European Athletics U23 Championships – Men's 100 metres =

The men's 100 metres event at the 2001 European Athletics U23 Championships was held in Amsterdam, Netherlands, at Olympisch Stadion on 12 and 13 July.

== Medalists ==
Gold	Jonathan Barbour; United Kingdom
Silver	Fabrice Calligny; France
Bronze	Przemysław Rogowski; Poland

== Results ==
=== Final ===
13 July
Wind: 2.2 m/s

Rank	Name	Nationality	Time	Notes
1st place, gold medalist(s)	Jonathan Barbour	United Kingdom	10.26 w	
2nd place, silver medalist(s)	Fabrice Calligny	France	10.40 w	
3rd place, bronze medalist(s)	Przemysław Rogowski	Poland	10.45 w	
4	Matic Osovnikar	Slovenia	10.47 w	
5	Simone Collio	Italy	10.48 w	
6	Ricardo Alves	Portugal	10.53 w	
7	Cecilio Maestra	Spain	10.54 w	
8	Yannick Urbino	France	10.71 w	

=== Heats ===
12 July
Qualified: first 2 in each heat and 2 best to the Final

==== Heat 1 ====
Wind: 1.4 m/s

Rank	Name	Nationality	Time	Notes
1	Fabrice Calligny	France	10.47	Q
2	Matic Osovnikar	Slovenia	10.56	Q
3	Simone Collio	Italy	10.59	q
4	Oliver König	Germany	10.64	
5	Christofer Sandin	Sweden	10.69	
6	Slaven Krajačić	Croatia	11.08	
7	Kostyantyn Vasyukov	Ukraine	22.39	

==== Heat 2 ====
Wind: 0.3 m/s

Rank	Name	Nationality	Time	Notes
1	Przemysław Rogowski	Poland	10.49	Q
2	Cecilio Maestra	Spain	10.65	Q
3	Antony Ferro	Belgium	10.69	
4	Rasgawa Pinnock	Germany	10.77	
5	Thomas Näsi	Finland	10.78	
6	Damien Degroote	France	11.76	

==== Heat 3 ====
Wind: 0.9 m/s

Rank	Name	Nationality	Time	Notes
1	Jonathan Barbour	United Kingdom	10.43	Q
2	Ricardo Alves	Portugal	10.49	Q
3	Yannick Urbino	France	10.56	q
4	Attila Farkas	Hungary	10.60	
5	Emanuele Di Gregorio	Italy	10.73	
6	Ángel David Rodríguez	Spain	10.75	
7	Gian Nicola Bernardi	San Marino	10.80	

== Participation ==
According to an unofficial count, 20 athletes from 15 countries participated in the event.

- Belgium (1)
- Croatia (1)
- Finland (1)
- France (3)
- Germany (2)
- Hungary (1)
- Italy (2)
- Poland (1)
- Portugal (1)
- San Marino (1)
- Slovenia (1)
- Spain (2)
- Sweden (1)
- Ukraine (1)
- United Kingdom (1)
