= Przemysław Rogowski =

Polish sprinter (born 1980)

Personal information
- Nationality: Poland
- Born: 9 February 1980 (age 46) Kalisz, Poland

Sport
- Sport: Running
- Event(s): 100 metres, 200 metres
Medal record
Men's athletics
Representing Poland
European Athletics Championships
Silver medal – second place	2006 Gothenburg	4×100 m relay

Przemysław Rogowski (born 9 February 1980) is a Polish track and field athlete who specializes in the 100 metres.

== International competitions ==
Year	Competition	Venue	Position	Event	Notes
Representing Poland
1999	European Junior Championships	Riga, Latvia	9th	100 metres	10.55 (w)
1999	European Junior Championships	Riga, Latvia	2nd	4 × 100 m relay	39.67
2001	European U23 Championships	Amsterdam, Netherlands	3rd	100 metres	10.45 w (wind: 2.2 m/s)
2001	European U23 Championships	Amsterdam, Netherlands	1st	4 × 100 m relay	39.41
2006	European Championships	Gothenburg, Sweden	2nd	4 × 100 m relay	39.05
