= Malachi Davis =

Athletics competitor

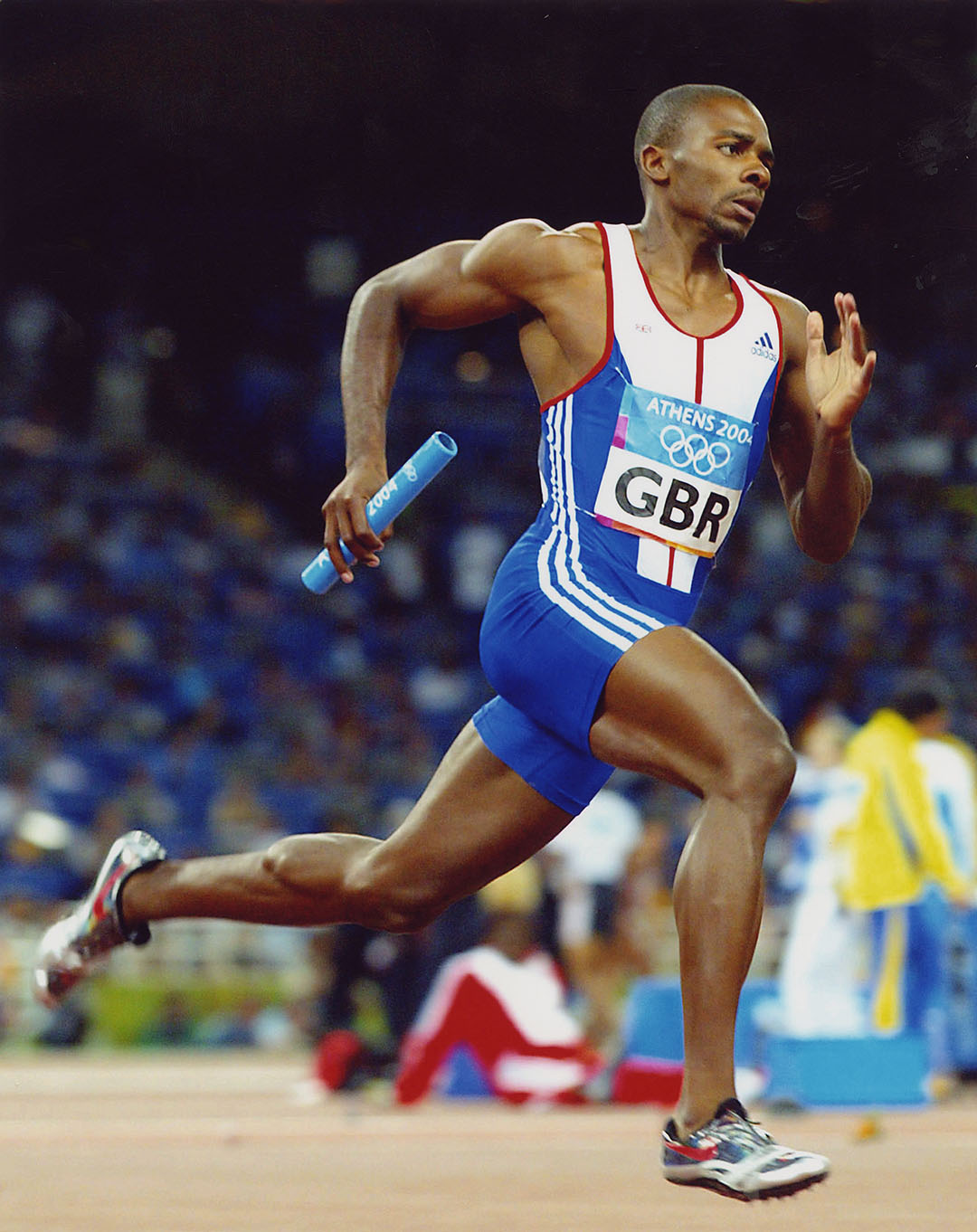

Personal information
- Nationality: American/British
- Born: September 13, 1977 (age 48) Sacramento, California, U.S.
- Height: 183 cm (6 ft 0 in)
- Weight: 79 kg (174 lb)

Sport
- Sport: Athletics
- Club: Woodford Green with Essex Ladies; California Golden Bears
- Retired: 2012

Malachi John Davis (born September 13, 1977) is a sprinter who competed in the 2004 Summer Olympic Games, representing Great Britain in the finals for the 4 × 400 m relay team. He competed in two Olympic events in 2004, and in the World Championships for his relay teams in 2005. After the Olympics, Davis and fellow 2004 Gold medalist Joanna Hayes formed Formula Gold, a sports performance company inspired by Olympic training methods and workouts. Today, Davis serves as the creative director and CEO for Formula Gold, where he does fitness consultant work for all major sports associations (the MLB, NFL, NBA and ATP) in addition to creating physical education curriculums for school districts throughout the state of California.

== Early life and college ==
Davis was born in Sacramento, California and raised in Davis, California. The middle of four children, he has two twin sisters and an older brother. Davis was first exposed to athletics at the early age of seven. Davis's mother entered his brother into a nationwide track meet, the Hershey Invitational, which was recruiting the best athletes from each state to compete. Davis accompanied his mother to watch the race, when she told him moments before the competition that she had entered him as well. From that first race forward, he competed and won every local track event, even qualifying for the state nationals.

In high school, Davis held the record in the 400m and 200m, which made him eligible for the state championships. From there, he attended Sacramento City College, where he became the state champion in the 400m and 4x4 relay. Davis was inducted into the Sacramento City College Hall of Fame in 2017.

From Sacramento City College, Davis attended the University of California, Los Angeles (UCLA) on a full scholarship, where he became an All-American NCAA champion. He competed in the 4 × 400 m relay split, in addition to the 4 × 400 m indoor record teams. Today, Davis is featured on UCLA's Wall of Fame at Drake Stadium for his track and field accomplishments.

== Professional career ==
=== 2004 Athens Summer Olympics ===
The highlight of Davis's athletic career came in 2004, when he competed in the 2004 Summer Olympics in Athens, Greece after being recruited by the British Athletic Confederation. While Davis is American, he represented his mother's native country of Great Britain, where he competed in two Olympic events. He qualified for the 400m and the 4 × 400 m relay. He was eliminated in the rounds of the 400m, but placed 5th for the 4 × 400 m relay team.

Following the Olympic Games, Davis was runner-up in the UK trials and competed in the 2005 World Athletics Championships in the 400m and the 4 × 400 m relay. While he was eliminated in the 400m, Davis made it to the finals of the 4 × 400 m team, placing 4th (2:58:82) in the relay split 44.3 anchor leg.

=== 2005-Today ===
After the Olympic Games Davis focused on his sports performance company, Formula Gold. His Olympic-style training programs combine swimming, running, balance and gymnastics, with levels ranging from amateur to professional athlete. Davis, who serves as the creative director of Formula Gold, also works closely with retired New York Yankees star, Alex Rodriguez. Davis designed Rodriguez's fitness regimen for his New York Yankees comeback in 2015, after the MLB star's year-long hiatus. Thanks to Davis's rigorous training program, Rodriguez had one of the best years of his athletic career. Davis served as the MLB star's trainer for the last two years of his New York Yankees contract, and now oversees the fitness division of Rodriguez's company, A-Rod Corp. Through A-Rod Corp, Davis does consultant work for fitness facilities.

== Achievements ==
During his adolescent years, Davis was a 2X State Qualifier in the 400m. He holds the record for the 400m at Davis High School, and became the state champion while competing in the 400m and 4 × 400 m at Sacramento City College. While attending UCLA on a full scholarship, Davis was named an All-American NCAA champion, where he was a member of the 4 × 400 m (3:01.12) relay split and the 4 × 400 m indoor record team. In 2004 Davis competed in the Summer Olympics for Great Britain, making it to the finals where he placed 5th for the relay team. Following the Olympic Games, he competed in the World Athletics Championships, where he placed 4th in the relay split anchor leg. Post Olympics, Davis starred in numerous athletic commercials for Nike, Adidas and Yahoo, in addition to snagging a feature in Runners World Magazine.

== Philanthropy ==
In 2003, Davis helped design after-school athletic curriculums for youth in the inner cities as part of Arnold Schwarzenegger's program, After-School All-Stars.

In 2012, Davis joined the Real Medicine Foundation where he worked on the L.A. Marathon campaign, raising awareness for people living in disaster-stricken areas across the world. Through the foundation, he provided those in need with medical and physical support.
