= Marcin Płacheta =

Polish bobsledder

Personal information
- Nationality: Polish
- Born: 23 March 1979 (age 46); Skierniewice, Poland

Sport
- Sport: Bobsleigh

Marcin Płacheta (born 23 March 1979) is a Polish bobsledder. He competed in the four man event at the 2006 Winter Olympics.
