= Elena Sordelli =

Italian sprinter

Personal information
- Nationality: Italian
- Born: 13 April 1976 (age 50) Sesto San Giovanni

Sport
- Country: Italy
- Sport: Athletics
- Event: Sprinting
- Club: Geas Atletica

Achievements and titles
- Personal bests: 100 m: 11.56 (2007); 60 indoor: 7.38 (2004)
Medal record
European Cup
Bronze medal – third place	2005 Florence	4×100 m relay
Mediterranean Games
Bronze medal – third place	2005 Almeria	4×100 m relay
European Junior Championships
Silver medal – second place	1995 Nyíregyháza	4×100 m relay
European U23 Championships
Bronze medal – third place	1997 Turku	4×100 m relay

Elena Sordelli (born 13 April 1976) is an Italian female retired sprinter, which participated at the 1997 World Championships in Athletics.

== Biography ==
She won four medals in international competitions with the Italian national track relay team (two at senior level and two at young level). After his retirement from the competitive competitions, which took place in 2014 at the age of 38, she is the sports manager of Bracco Atletica.

== Achievements ==
Year	Competition	Venue	Position	Event	Time	Notes
1995	European Junior Championships	(Hungary) Nyíregyháza	2nd	4×100 metres relay	45.37	
1997	World Indoor Championships	(France) Paris	Heat	60 metres	7.57	
1997	European U23 Championships	(Finland) Turku	3rd	4×100 metres relay	44.73	
1997	World Championships	(Greece) Athens	Heat	4×100 metres relay	44.16	
2005	European Cup (Super League)	(Italy) Florence	3rd	4×100 metres relay	43.83	
2005	Mediterranean Games	(Spain) Almeria	3rd	4×100 metres relay	45.18	

== National titles ==
Sordelli won two national championships at individual senior level at a distance of eight years from each other.

- Italian Athletics Championships
  - 100 m: 1998, 2006 (2)

== See also ==
- Italian national track relay team
