= Real Medicine Foundation =

Nonprofit organization

Real Medicine Foundation (RMF) is a US-based nonprofit public charity that provides humanitarian support and development around the world, helping communities recover from natural disasters, conflict, and poverty. RMF was created in response to the 2004 Indian Ocean tsunami, which killed over 200,000 people and displaced thousands more. Pediatrician Dr. Martina Fuchs traveled to Sri Lanka, where she opened a small medical clinic in the Mawella Camp for tsunami survivors. Based on the needs she witnessed and patients requiring longer-term support, Fuchs founded Real Medicine Foundation in 2005. As of September 2018, the organization has grown to include over 70 active projects and has worked in 24 countries.

Real Medicine Foundation Logo

Real Medicine Foundation defines holistic, or "real" medicine, as "providing medical/physical, emotional, economic, and social support." Because of this philosophy, the organization's projects often start with health clinics and disaster relief, but evolve into additional support that includes health research, mobile clinics and outreach, health systems strengthening, education and school support, vocational training, psychological trauma support, and malnutrition eradication. The end goal is "Liberating Human Potential"; by employing only nationals for in-country operations and working closely with communities in need, the organization works to empower local community members and leaders to create long-term solutions to natural disasters, conflict, and poverty.
