= Abderrahim El Haouzy =

French-Moroccan sprinter

Abderrahim El Haouzy (born 1 April 1975) is a French sprinter. He specializes in the 400 metres.

El Haouzy was born in Oued Jdida, and represented his birth country of Morocco until 2003.

El Haouzy finished sixth in the 4 × 400 m relay at the 2005 World Championships, together with teammates Leslie Djhone, Naman Keïta and Marc Raquil.

His personal best time is 45.82 seconds, achieved in May 2006 in Brazzaville.
