= Lueyi Dovy =

French sprinter of Gabonese descent

Personal information
- Born: November 10, 1975 (age 50) Marseille, France
Medal record
Men's athletics
Representing France
World Championships
Gold medal – first place	2005 Helsinki	4×100 m
Mediterranean Games
Silver medal – second place	2005 Almería	100 m
Representing Gabon
African Championships
Bronze medal – third place	2000 Algiers	4×100 m

Lueyi Dovy (born 1975 in Marseille) is a French sprinter of Gabonese descent. Together with Ladji Doucouré, Ronald Pognon and Eddy De Lépine he won a gold medal in 4 × 100 metres relay at the 2005 World Championships in Athletics.

== Personal bests ==
- 100 metres - 10.24 (2005)
- 200 metres - 20.68

== Results ==
- 2005 French Champion (Angers).
- 2007 French Champion (Niort).
