= Simon Kirch =

German sprinter

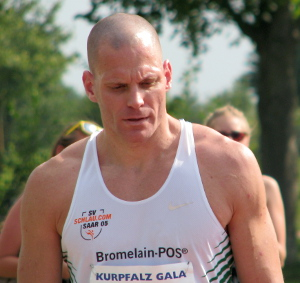
- Simon Kirch in 2012

Personal information
- Full name: Simon Kirch
- Born: 26 September 1979 (age 46) Neuwied, West Germany
- Height: 1.81 m (5 ft 11 in)

Sport
- Country: Germany
- Sport: Athletics
- Event: 400 metres

Achievements and titles
- Personal bests: 400 metres: 45.57 (Nuremberg; 6 July 2008)

Simon Kirch (born 26 September 1979 in Neuwied) is a German track and field athlete specialised in the 400 metres. A two time national champion, Kirch participated in the 2008 Summer Olympics in Beijing as part of the German 4 × 400m relay team which failed to reach the final.
