= Phara Anacharsis =

French athlete (born 1983)

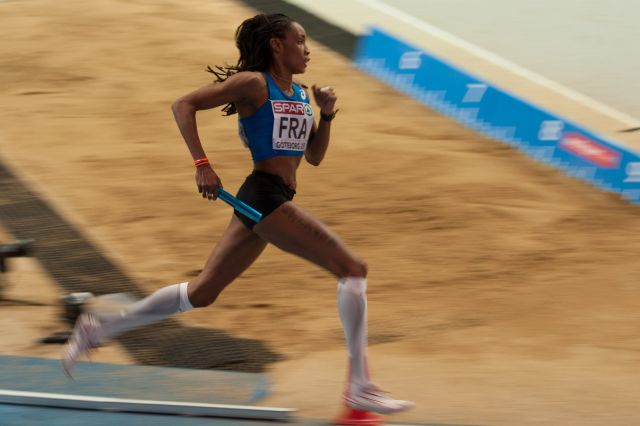
- Anacharsis in 2013

Personal information
- Born: 17 December 1983 (age 42) Fort-de-France, France
- Height: 1.77 m (5 ft 10 in)
- Weight: 58 kg (128 lb)

Sport
- Country: France
- Sport: Athletics
- Events: 400 metres 4 × 400m Relay
- Club: Lille Metropole Athletisme
- Coached by: Bruno Gajer
Medal record
World Championships
Bronze medal – third place	2013 Moscow	4×400 m relay
European Championships
Gold medal – first place	2014 Zürich	4x400 m relay
Silver medal – second place	2012 Helsinki	4x400 m relay
Silver medal – second place	2016 Amsterdam	4x400 m relay

Phara Anacharsis (born 17 December 1983) is a French athlete who specializes in the 400 metres and the 400 metres hurdles.

== Biography ==
She was born in Fort-de-France. In the 200 metres she won the bronze medal at the 2005 Jeux de la Francophonie, and in the 400 meters the silver medal at the 2005 Mediterranean Games. She also competed at the 2002 World Junior Championships, the 2005 European Indoor Championships and the 2006 European Championships without reaching the final. She later turned to the hurdles, and won the gold medal at the 2009 Mediterranean Games.

In the 4 x 400 metres relay she finished seventh at the 2006 European Championships, and also competed at the 2007 World Championships and the 2008 Olympic Games without reaching the final. At the 2012 Summer Olympics, she was part of the French team that came 6th in the final. At the 2014 European championships, she ran in the heats but not the final, when France won the gold.

In the 400 m hurdles, she competed at the 2013 World Championships but did not reach the final.

Her personal best times are 23.39 seconds in the 200 metres, achieved in August 2007 in La Chaux-de-Fonds; 51.87 seconds in the 400 metres, achieved in June 2008 in Patras and 55.84 seconds in the 400 metres hurdles, achieved in June 2016 in Montreuil.
