= Margaret Maury =

French long-distance runner

Margaret Maury, née Kerubo (born 15 May 1974 in Kenya) is a French long-distance runner who specializes in the 5000 metres. She changed nationality from her native Kenya in 2002.

== Achievements ==
Year	Tournament	Venue	Result	Extra
2004	Olympic Games	Athens, Greece	11th	5000 m
	World Athletics Final	Monte Carlo, Monaco	11th	3000 m
2005	French National Championships	Angers, France	1st	5000 m
2005	Mediterranean Games	Almería, Spain	1st	5000 m

=== Personal bests ===
- 1500 metres - 4:11.40 min (2004)
- 3000 metres - 8:57.82 min (2004)
- 3000 metres steeplechase - 10:05.15 min (2001)
- 5000 metres - 14:43.90 min (2004)
- 10,000 metres - 32:01.01 min (2004)
- Half marathon - 1:11:06 hrs (2001)
- Marathon - 2:38:21 hrs (2000)
