= Tetyana Kryvobok =

Ukrainian middle-distance runner

Tetyana Yuriyivna Mezentseva-Kryvobok (Ukrainian: Тетя́на Ю́ріївна Ме́зенцева-Кривобо́к; born 17 January 1972) is a Ukrainian middle distance runner who specializes in the 3000 metres.

She finished fifteenth at the 2005 European Indoor Athletics Championships in Madrid and ninth at the 2006 IAAF World Indoor Championships in Moscow.

Her personal best time over 3000 m is 8:58.87 min, achieved in May 2005 in Yalta.
