= Angela Rinicella =

Italian long-distance runner

Personal information
- National team: Italy (8 caps 2002-2006)
- Born: 7 May 1982 (age 44) Altofonte, Italy

Sport
- Country: Italy
- Sport: Athletics
- Events: Long-distance running; Cross country running
- Club: G.S. Esercito

Achievements and titles
- Personal bests: 3000 m: 9:14.93 (2006); 5000 m: 16:35.17 (2002); Half marathon: 1:23:35 (2013)

Angela Rinicella (born 7 May 1982) is a former Italian female long-distance runner and cross-country runner who competed at individual senior level at the World Athletics Cross Country Championships (2003, 2005, 2006).

== Biography ==
She was born in Altofonte near Palermo, Sicily as the silver Olympic medal Salvatore Antibo. Rinicella was 10th in 10,000 m at the 2005 Mediterranean Games.

== National titles ==
She won a national championship at individual senior level.

- Italian Cross Country Championships
  - Short race: 2006
