= Julián Martínez (sprinter) =

Spanish sprinter (born 1980)

Julian Martínez (born 9 February 1980) is a retired Spanish sprinter.

He finished seventh in the 200 metres in the 2002 IAAF World Cup. He also competed at the 2002 European Championships without reaching the final.

Martínez has managed a time of 21.00 seconds in the 200 metres, achieved in July 2002 in Salamanca; and 10.46 seconds in the 100 metres, achieved in September 2002 in La Laguna.
