= Richard Maunier =

French sprinter

Richard Maunier (born 8 December 1977 in Fort-de-France, Martinique) is a French athlete who specialises in the 400 meters. Maunier competed at the 2008 Summer Olympics.
