= Ydrissa M'Barke =

French sprinter

Ydrissa M'Barke (born 30 March 1983 in Rouen, France) is a French athlete who specialises in the 400 meters. M'Barke competed at the 2008 Summer Olympics.
