= 2006 European Athletics Championships – Men's 4 × 100 metres relay =

Men's 4 × 100 metres relay at the European Athletics Championships

The men's 4 × 100 metres relay at the 2006 European Athletics Championships were held at the Ullevi on August 12 and August 13.

== Medalists ==
Gold	Silver	Bronze
Great Britain; Dwain Chambers; Darren Campbell; Marlon Devonish; Mark Lewis-Francis	Poland; Przemysław Rogowski; Łukasz Chyła; Marcin Jędrusiński; Dariusz Kuć	France; Oudéré Kankarafou; Ronald Pognon; Fabrice Calligny; David Alerte

== Schedule ==
Date	Time	Round
August 12, 2006	16:55	Heats
August 13, 2006	15:30	Final

== Results ==
KEY:	q	Fastest non-qualifiers	Q	Qualified	NR	National record	PB	Personal best	SB	Seasonal best

=== Heats ===
First 3 in each heat (Q) and the next 2 fastest (q) advance to the Final.

Rank	Heat	Nation	Athlete	Time	Notes
1	1	Great Britain	Dwain Chambers, Darren Campbell, Marlon Devonish, Mark Lewis-Francis	38.77	Q
2	1	Italy	Luca Verdecchia, Stefano Anceschi, Massimiliano Donati, Francesco Scuderi	38.84	Q
3	2	France	Oudéré Kankarafou, Ronald Pognon, Fabrice Calligny, David Alerte	38.85	Q
4	2	Poland	Przemysław Rogowski, Łukasz Chyła, Marcin Jędrusiński, Dariusz Kuć	38.89	Q
5	1	Germany	Alexander Kosenkow, Marius Broening, Sebastian Ernst, Ronny Ostwald	38.94	Q
6	2	Netherlands	Timothy Beck, Caimin Douglas, Guus Hoogmoed, Patrick van Luijk	39.18	Q
7	1	Russia	Mikhail Yegorychev, Ivan Teplykh, Roman Smirnov, Andrey Yepishin	39.31	q
8	1	Ukraine	Kostyantyn Vasyukov, Dmytro Hlushchenko, Anatoliy Dovhal, Roman Bublyk	39.57	q
9	1	Switzerland	Andreas Baumann, Marco Cribari, Marc Niederhauser, Markus Lüthi	39.59	
10	2	Finland	Timo Salonen, Nghi Tran, Jarkko Ruostekivi, Tommi Hartonen	39.67	
11	1	Estonia	Argo Golberg, Henri Sool, Martin Vihmann, Marek Niit	39.74	
12	2	Sweden	Daniel Persson, Johan Engberg, Christofer Sandin, Stefan Tärnhuvud	40.14	
13	2	Norway	Martin Rypdal, John Ertzgaard, Christian Mogstad, Andreas Kristiansen	40.36	
	1	Belgium	Tom Schippers, Xavier De Baerdemaker, Anthony Ferro, Kristof Beyens	DNF	
	2	Slovenia	Marko Bratož, Jan Žumer, Matjaž Borovina, Matic Osovnikar	DNF	
	2	Spain	Iván Mocholí, Ángel David Rodríguez, Orkatz Beitia, Josué Mena	DQ	

=== Final ===
Rank	Nation	Athletes	Time	Notes
1st place, gold medalist(s)	Great Britain	Dwain Chambers, Darren Campbell, Marlon Devonish, Mark Lewis-Francis	38.91	
2nd place, silver medalist(s)	Poland	Przemysław Rogowski, Łukasz Chyła, Marcin Jędrusiński, Dariusz Kuć	39.05	
3rd place, bronze medalist(s)	France	Oudéré Kankarafou, Ronald Pognon, Fabrice Calligny, David Alerte	39.07	
4	Russia	Maksim Mokrousov, Mikhail Yegorychev, Roman Smirnov, Aleksandr Smirnov	39.29	
5	Germany	Alexander Kosenkow, Marius Broening, Sebastian Ernst, Ronny Ostwald	39.38	
6	Italy	Luca Verdecchia, Stefano Anceschi, Massimiliano Donati, Francesco Scuderi	39.42	
7	Ukraine	Roman Bublyk, Kostyantyn Vasyukov, Anatoliy Dovhal, Dmytro Hlushchenko	39.54	
8	Netherlands	Timothy Beck, Caimin Douglas, Guus Hoogmoed, Patrick van Luijk	39.64	
