= 2004 European Cup Super League =

These are the full results of the 2004 European Cup Super League which was held on 19 and 20 June 2004 at the Zdzisław Krzyszkowiak Stadium in Bydgoszcz, Poland.

== Final standings ==
Men
Pos.	Team	Points
1	Germany	107.5
2	France	105
3	Poland	104
4	Great Britain	102.5
5	Russia	99
6	Italy	72
7	Sweden	67
8	Netherlands	62

Women
Pos.	Team	Points
1	Russia	142
2	Ukraine	97
3	France	92.5
4	Germany	92
5	Poland	86.5
6	Greece	79
7	Spain	66
8	Great Britain	63

== Men's results ==
=== 100 metres ===
19 June
Wind: -3.2 m/s

Rank	Name	Nationality	Time	Notes	Points
1	Łukasz Chyła	Poland	10.42		8
2	Ronald Pognon	France	10.43		7
3	Ronny Ostwald	Germany	10.49		6
4	Simone Collio	Italy	10.53		5
5	Andrey Yepishin	Russia	10.62		4
6	Troy Douglas	Netherlands	10.80		3
7	Christofer Sandin	Sweden	10.85		2
	Mark Lewis-Francis	Great Britain	DQ		0

=== 200 metres ===
20 June
Wind: 0.0 m/s

Rank	Name	Nationality	Time	Notes	Points
1	Christian Malcolm	Great Britain	20.56		8
2	Johan Wissman	Sweden	20.61		7
3	Marco Torrieri	Italy	20.62		6
4	Ronald Pognon	France	20.63		5
5	Sebastian Ernst	Germany	20.63		4
6	Marcin Urbaś	Poland	20.77		3
7	Roman Smirnov	Russia	21.00	SB	2
8	Caimin Douglas	Netherlands	21.11		1

=== 400 metres ===
19 June

Rank	Name	Nationality	Time	Notes	Points
1	Tim Benjamin	Great Britain	45.37		8
2	Ingo Schultz	Germany	45.50		7
3	Leslie Djhone	France	45.73		6
4	Piotr Klimczak	Poland	46.04		5
5	Anton Galkin-Samitov	Russia	46.10		4
6	Andrea Barberi	Italy	46.17		3
7	Jimisola Laursen	Sweden	46.50		2
8	Youssef El Rhalfioui	Netherlands	46.51		1

=== 800 metres ===
20 June

Rank	Name	Nationality	Time	Notes	Points
1	Florent Lacasse	France	1:45.19		8
2	René Herms	Germany	1:45.27		7
3	Dmitry Bogdanov	Russia	1:45.64		6
4	Arnoud Okken	Netherlands	1:45.99		5
5	Grzegorz Krzosek	Poland	1:46.42		4
6	Livio Sciandra	Italy	1:46.81		3
7	Rickard Pell	Sweden	1:47.21		2
8	James McIlroy	Great Britain	1:51.13		1

=== 1500 metres ===
19 June

Rank	Name	Nationality	Time	Notes	Points
1	Mehdi Baala	France	3:49.13		8
2	Michael East	Great Britain	3:49.53		7
3	Yuriy Borzakovskiy	Russia	3:50.99	SB	6
4	Marko Koers	Netherlands	3:51.35		5
5	Toni Mohr	Germany	3:51.85		4
6	Zbigniew Graczyk	Poland	3:52.08		3
7	Christian Obrist	Italy	3:53.22		2
8	Ahmed Mohamed	Sweden	3:53.80		1

=== 3000 metres ===
20 June

Rank	Name	Nationality	Time	Notes	Points
1	Wolfram Müller	Germany	8:04.37		8
2	Gert-Jan Liefers	Netherlands	8:04.41	SB	7
3	Vyacheslav Shabunin	Russia	8:05.92		6
4	Irba Lakhal	France	8:07.25		5
5	Radosław Popławski	Poland	8:07.50	SB	4
6	Chris Thompson	Great Britain	8:08.16		3
7	Henrik Skoog	Sweden	8:08.22	SB	2
8	Massimo Pegoretti	Italy	8:08.52		1

=== 5000 metres ===
19 June

Rank	Name	Nationality	Time	Notes	Points
1	John Mayock	Great Britain	14:44.71		8
2	Sergey Ivanov	Russia	14:44.75		7
3	Mokhtar Benhari	France	14:44.78		6
4	Salvatore Vincenti	Italy	14:46.96		5
5	Kamiel Maase	Netherlands	14:47.46		4
6	Yared Shegumo	Poland	14:48.08		3
7	Thorsten Gombert	Germany	14:54.14		2
8	Erik Sjöqvist	Sweden	14:57.36		1

=== 110 metres hurdles ===
20 June
Wind: -1.0 m/s

Rank	Name	Nationality	Time	Notes	Points
1	Robert Kronberg	Sweden	13.58		8
2	Tomasz Ścigaczewski	Poland	13.66		7
3	Andy Turner	Great Britain	13.68		6
4	Mike Fenner	Germany	13.70		5
5	Sébastien Denis	France	13.74		4
6	Gregory Sedoc	Netherlands	13.76		3
7	Yevgeniy Pechonkin	Russia	13.79		2
8	Andrea Giaconi	Italy	13.83		1

=== 400 metres hurdles ===
19 June

Rank	Name	Nationality	Time	Notes	Points
1	Chris Rawlinson	Great Britain	48.59		8
2	Naman Keïta	France	49.04		7
3	Boris Gorban	Russia	49.71		6
4	Thomas Kortbeek	Netherlands	49.82		5
5	Paweł Januszewski	Poland	50.07		4
6	Gianni Carabelli	Italy	50.22		3
7	Andreas Wickert	Germany	50.82		2
8	Niklas Larsson	Sweden	53.14	SB	1

=== 3000 metres steeplechase ===
20 June

Rank	Name	Nationality	Time	Notes	Points
1	Bouabdellah Tahri	France	8:23.40		8
2	Jakub Czaja	Poland	8:25.51		7
3	Giuseppe Maffei	Italy	8:27.53		6
4	Mustafa Mohamed	Sweden	8:28.23		5
5	Roman Usov	Russia	8:30.99		4
6	Stephan Hohl	Germany	8:32.68		3
7	Joost Blokland	Netherlands	8:40.50	PB	2
8	Jermaine Mays	Great Britain	9:25.44		1

=== 4 × 100 metres relay ===
19 June

Rank	Nation	Athletes	Time	Note	Points
1	Great Britain	Christian Malcolm, Darren Campbell, Chris Lambert, Mark Lewis-Francis	38.67		8
2	Poland	Zbigniew Tulin, Łukasz Chyła, Marcin Jędrusiński, Marcin Urbaś	38.68		7
3	Germany	Alexander Kosenkow, Ronny Ostwald, Tobias Unger, Till Helmke	38.76		6
4	Italy	Marco Torrieri, Simone Collio, Massimiliano Donati, Alessandro Cavallaro	38.87		5
5	France	Eddy De Lépine, Ronald Pognon, Frédéric Krantz, David Alerte	38.87	SB	4
6	Russia	Sergey Bychkov, Aleksandr Ryabov, Roman Smirnov, Andrey Yepishin	38.95	SB	3
7	Sweden	Robert Kronberg, Christofer Sandin, Johan Wissman, Johan Engberg	39.52	SB	2
8	Netherlands	Timothy Beck, Troy Douglas, Guus Hoogmoed, Caimin Douglas	39.54		1

=== 4 × 400 metres relay ===
20 June

Rank	Nation	Athletes	Time	Note	Points
1	Germany	Ingo Schultz, Kamghe Gaba, Ruwen Faller, Bastian Swillims	3:01.78	SB	8
2	Russia	Anton Galkin, Andrey Rudnitskiy, Aleksandr Usov, Ruslan Mashchenko	3:01.88	SB	7
3	Poland	Piotr Klimczak, Artur Gąsiewski, Marcin Marciniszyn, Robert Maćkowiak	3:02.05	SB	6
4	France	Aberahim El Haouzy, Ahmed Douhou, Richard Maunier, Naman Keïta	3:02.09	SB	5
5	Great Britain	Sean Baldock, Tim Benjamin, Chris Rawlinson, Daniel Caines	3:02.90		4
6	Sweden	Thomas Nikitin, Jimisola Laursen, Johan Wissman, Andreas Mokdasi	3:03.35	SB	3
7	Netherlands	Youssef El Rhalfioui, Rikkert van Rhee, Thomas Kortbeek, Robert Lathouwers	3:06.29	SB	2
8	Italy	Andrea Barberi, Eugenio Mattei, Luca Galletti, Marco Salvucci	3:14.34		1

=== High jump ===
19 June

Rank	Name	Nationality	1.95	2.05	2.11	2.16	2.20	2.24	2.27	2.30	2.32	2.34	Result	Notes	Points
1	Stefan Holm	Sweden	–	–	–	–	o	o	o	o	xo	xxx	2.32		8
2	Grzegorz Sposób	Poland	–	–	o	–	o	o	xo	o	xxo	xxx	2.32		7
3	Roman Fricke	Germany	–	–	–	xo	o	o	o	x–	xx		2.27		6
4	Nicola Ciotti	Italy	–	–	–	–	o	xo	xxo	xxx			2.27		5
5	Dalton Grant	Great Britain	–	–	o	o	o	xxx					2.20		3.5
5	Vyacheslav Voronin	Russia	–	–	–	–	o	xxx					2.20		3.5
7	Grégory Gabella	France	–	–	–	o	xo	xxx					2.20		2
8	Joost van Bennekom	Netherlands	o	o	o	xxx							2.11	PB	1

=== Pole vault ===
20 June

Rank	Name	Nationality	5.00	5.20	535	5.45	5.55	5.65	5.70	5.75	5.80	5.85	Result	Notes	Points
1	Romain Mesnil	France	–	–	o	–	xo	xxo	–	xxo	–	xxx	5.75		8
2	Patrik Kristiansson	Sweden	–	–	–	o	o	o	o	–	xxx		5.70		7
3	Lars Börgeling	Germany	–	–	–	xo	–	o	xxx				5.65		6.5
3	Yevgeniy Mikhaylichenko	Russia	–	o	o	o	xo	o	xx–	x			5.65	SB	6.5
5	Adam Kolasa	Poland	–	xxo	o	o	o	xxo	xxx				5.65	SB	4
6	Rens Blom	Netherlands	–	–	–	o	–	xxx					5.45		3
7	Tim Thomas	Great Britain	o	o	xxo	xxx							5.35		2
8	Matteo Rubbiani	Italy	o	o	xxx								5.20		1

=== Long jump ===
19 June

Rank	Name	Nationality	#1	#2	#3	#4	Result	Notes	Points
1	Chris Tomlinson	Great Britain	7.99w	8.03w	8.28w	8.10w	8.28w		8
2	Salim Sdiri	France	x	8.24	x	x	8.24	SB	7
3	Vitaliy Shkurlatov	Russia	8.08w	8.05	8.00	8.13	8.13		6
4	Tomasz Mateusiak	Poland	x	7.82	8.02w	x	8.02w		5
5	Nils Winter	Germany	7.85w	7.90	7.99w	6.78w	7.99w		4
6	Nicola Trentin	Italy	x	x	x	7.96w	7.96w		3
7	Jurgen Cools	Netherlands	7.68	7.65w	x	x	7.68		2
8	Robert Bagge	Sweden	7.30	–	–	–	7.30		1

=== Triple jump ===
20 June

Rank	Name	Nationality	#1	#2	#3	#4	Result	Notes	Points
1	Christian Olsson	Sweden	17.07	x	17.05	17.30w	17.30w		8
2	Danil Burkenya	Russia	16.36	16.95	17.28	x	17.28		7
3	Phillips Idowu	Great Britain	16.50	16.66	16.73	17.10w	17.10w		6
4	Jacek Kazimierowski	Poland	16.17	16.47	x	16.89w	16.89w		5
5	Julien Kapek	France	x	x	16.34	16.86	16.86		4
6	Fabrizio Donato	Italy	16.05	16.17	x	16.11	16.17		3
7	Thomas Moede	Germany	15.73	14.30	15.95	15.95	15.95		2
8	Martijn Delissen	Netherlands	x	x	x	14.62	14.62	SB	1

=== Shot put ===
19 June

Rank	Name	Nationality	#1	#2	#3	#4	Result	Notes	Points
1	Carl Myerscough	Great Britain	x	19.16	20.28	20.85	20.85		8
2	Rutger Smith	Netherlands	20.56	x	x	x	20.56		7
3	Ralf Bartels	Germany	x	x	20.33	20.54	20.54		6
4	Tomasz Majewski	Poland	19.87	x	x	19.90	19.90		5
5	Paolo Dal Soglio	Italy	19.84	x	x	x	19.84		4
6	Pavel Chumachenko	Russia	x	x	19.47	x	19.47		3
7	Gaëtan Bucki	France	18.69	x	18.23	18.29	18.69		2
8	Magnus Lohse	Sweden	x	x	18.11	18.17	18.17		1

=== Discus throw ===
20 June

Rank	Name	Nationality	#1	#2	#3	#4	Result	Notes	Points
1	Michael Mollenbeck	Germany	57.26	62.52	61.15	64.42	64.42		8
2	Rutger Smith	Netherlands	62.53	61.18	63.68	60.79	63.68		7
3	Carl Myerscough	Great Britain	61.68	x	x	61.19	61.68		6
4	Andrzej Krawczyk	Poland	59.77	57.45	60.17	x	60.17		5
5	Bogdan Pishchalnikov	Russia	58.28	58.68	56.10	59.81	59.81		4
6	Diego Fortuna	Italy	58.57	59.76	58.12	59.05	59.76		3
7	Jean-Claude Retel	France	57.33	59.40	58.98	54.57	59.40		2
8	Kristian Pettersson	Sweden	54.26	x	52.18	53.35	54.26		1

=== Hammer throw ===
19 June

Rank	Name	Nationality	#1	#2	#3	#4	Result	Notes	Points
1	Szymon Ziółkowski	Poland	77.27	77.00	75.03	76.95	77.27		8
2	Markus Esser	Germany	73.83	75.91	76.97	74.24	76.97		7
3	Nicola Vizzoni	Italy	x	74.63	76.16	74.36	76.16		6
4	Sergey Kirmasov	Russia	x	73.62	x	x	73.62		5
5	Frédéric Pouzy	France	65.60	69.78	67.73	68.67	69.78		4
6	Bengt Johansson	Sweden	66.61	68.97	68.53	68.98	68.98		3
7	Mick Jones	Great Britain	68.37	68.56	x	x	68.56		2
8	Ronald Gram	Netherlands	62.34	65.78	67.12	65.57	67.12		1

=== Javelin throw ===
20 June

Rank	Name	Nationality	#1	#2	#3	#4	Result	Notes	Points
1	Aleksandr Ivanov	Russia	82.52	80.87	82.55	79.07	82.55		8
2	Peter Esenwein	Germany	80.38	82.43	x	78.65	82.43		7
3	Francesco Pignata	Italy	76.87	x	68.43	71.65	76.87		6
4	Nick Nieland	Great Britain	73.22	x	75.01	x	75.01		5
5	Dariusz Trafas	Poland	74.17	x	74.86	x	74.86		4
6	David Brisseault	France	72.05	74.37	74.07	73.87	74.37		3
7	Gabriel Wallin	Sweden	73.67	72.40	70.84	69.05	73.67		2
8	Elliott Thijssen	Netherlands	70.38	71.65	x	67.01	71.65		1

== Women's results ==
=== 100 metres ===
19 June
Wind: -1.9 m/s

Rank	Name	Nationality	Time	Notes	Points
1	Christine Arron	France	11.23		8
2	Yuliya Tabakova	Russia	11.39		7
3	Glory Alozie	Spain	11.49	SB	6
4	Joice Maduaka	Great Britain	11.56		5
5	Oksana Kaydash	Ukraine	11.65		4
6	Sina Schielke	Germany	11.65		3
7	Daria Onyśko	Poland	11.75		2
8	Effrosini Patsou	Greece	11.91		1

=== 200 metres ===
20 June
Wind: +0.6 m/s

Rank	Name	Nationality	Time	Notes	Points
1	Muriel Hurtis	France	22.78		8
2	Natalya Antyukh	Russia	22.83		7
3	Anzhela Kravchenko	Ukraine	23.10		6
4	Sina Schielke	Germany	23.22	SB	5
5	Anna Pacholak	Poland	23.24		4
6	Olga Kaidantzi	Greece	23.33		3
7	Joice Maduaka	Great Britain	23.43		2
8	Cristina Sanz	Spain	24.28		1

=== 400 metres ===
19 June

Rank	Name	Nationality	Time	Notes	Points
1	Olga Kotlyarova	Russia	50.09		8
2	Antonina Yefremova	Ukraine	51.79		7
3	Solen Désert	France	52.09		6
4	Claudia Marx	Germany	52.11		5
5	Donna Fraser	Great Britain	52.32		4
6	Grażyna Prokopek	Poland	52.40		3
7	Hrisa Goudenoudi	Greece	53.04		2
8	Julia Alba	Spain	53.87		1

=== 800 metres ===
19 June

Rank	Name	Nationality	Time	Notes	Points
1	Olga Raspopova	Russia	2:00.24		8
2	Claudia Gesell	Germany	2:01.27	SB	7
3	Susan Scott	Great Britain	2:01.35		6
4	Virginie Fouquet	France	2:01.63		5
5	Anna Zagórska	Poland	2:02.07		4
6	Esther Desviat	Spain	2:02.22		3
7	Tetyana Petlyuk	Ukraine	2:04.64		2
8	Konstadina Efedaki	Greece	2:05.61		1

=== 1500 metres ===
20 June

Rank	Name	Nationality	Time	Notes	Points
1	Iris Fuentes-Pila	Spain	4:08.05		8
2	Maria Martins	France	4:08.12		7
3	Yuliya Kosenkova	Russia	4:08.59		6
4	Nataliya Sydorenko Tobias	Ukraine	4:09.14		5
5	Kathleen Friedrich	Germany	4:09.48		4
6	Helen Clitheroe	Great Britain	4:09.97		3
7	Anna Jakubczak	Poland	4:11.30		2
8	Pagona Nika	Greece	4:25.12		1

=== 3000 metres ===
19 June

Rank	Name	Nationality	Time	Notes	Points
1	Gulnara Samitova	Russia	8:49.48	SB	8
2	Lidia Chojecka	Poland	8:52.60		7
3	Zulema Fuentes-Pila	Spain	8:52.90	PB	6
4	Margaret Maury	France	9:03.30		5
5	Antje Möldner	Germany	9:07.51	SB	4
6	Kate Reed	Great Britain	9:10.95		3
7	Tetyana Holovchenko	Ukraine	9:17.34		2
8	Pagona Nika	Greece	9:40.57	PB	1

=== 5000 metres ===
20 June

Rank	Name	Nationality	Time	Notes	Points
1	Paula Radcliffe	Great Britain	14:29.11	CR, NR	8
2	Liliya Shobukhova	Russia	14:52.19	SB	7
3	Sabrina Mockenhaupt	Germany	15:23.50		6
4	Wioletta Janowska	Poland	15:24.25	SB	5
5	Christelle Daunay	France	15:30.94	SB	4
6	María Cristina Petite	Spain	15:36.02	SB	3
7	Maryna Dubrova	Ukraine	15:50.31		2
8	Maria Protopappa	Greece	16:07.86		1

=== 100 metres hurdles ===
20 June
Wind: -1.0 m/s

Rank	Name	Nationality	Time	Notes	Points
1	Olena Krasovska	Ukraine	12.78		8
2	Irina Shevchenko	Russia	12.91		7
3	Glory Alozie	Spain	12.95		6
4	Flora Redoumi	Greece	12.99		5
5	Aurelia Trywiańska	Poland	12.99		4
6	Linda Khodadin	France	13.06		3
7	Kirsten Bolm	Germany	13.21		2
	Sarah Claxton	Great Britain	DNF		0

=== 400 metres hurdles ===
19 June

Rank	Name	Nationality	Time	Notes	Points
1	Fani Halkia	Greece	54.16		8
2	Yekaterina Bikert	Russia	54.60		7
3	Małgorzata Pskit	Poland	55.68		6
4	Anja Neupert	Germany	55.84		5
5	Cora Olivero	Spain	56.33		4
6	Liz Fairs	Great Britain	56.73	SB	3
7	Anastasiya Rabchenyuk	Ukraine	56.92		2
8	Corinne Tafflet	France	57.05		1

=== 3000 metres steeplechase ===
20 June

Rank	Name	Nationality	Time	Notes	Points
1	Élodie Olivarès	France	9:41.81	SB	8
2	Lyubov Ivanova	Russia	9:44.95	SB	7
3	Rosa María Morató	Spain	9:51.08	NR	6
4	Justyna Bąk	Poland	9:53.08		5
5	Verena Dreier	Germany	10:01.85		4
6	Tina Brown	Great Britain	10:16.19		3
7	Valentyna Gorpynych	Ukraine	10:27.15		2
8	Konstadina Kefala	Greece	10:33.15		1

=== 4 × 100 metres relay ===
19 June

Rank	Nation	Athletes	Time	Note	Points
1	France	Véronique Mang, Muriel Hurtis, Sylviane Félix, Christine Arron	42.41	SB	8
2	Russia	Olga Fedorova, Yuliya Tabakova, Irina Khabarova, Larisa Kruglova	42.93		7
3	Ukraine	Tetyana Tkalich, Anzhela Kravchenko, Oksana Kaydash, Iryna Shepetyuk	43.43		6
4	Germany	Cathleen Tschirch, Sina Schielke, Birgit Rockmeier, Katja Wakan	44.08		5
5	Poland	Iwona Dorobisz, Daria Onyśko, Małgorzata Flejszar, Dorota Dydo	44.62		4
6	Greece	Maria Karastamati, Effrosini Patsou, Olga Kaidantzi, Marina Vassarmidou	44.80		3
7	Spain	Carme Blay, Elena Corcoles, Belén Recio, Glory Alozie	44.81		2
8	Great Britain	Susan Deacon, Amy Spencer, Jeanette Kwakye, Joice Maduaka	45.02		1

=== 4 × 400 metres relay ===
20 June

Rank	Nation	Athletes	Time	Note	Points
1	Russia	Yuliya Gushchina, Natalya Ivanova, Yekaterina Bakhvalova, Tatyana Levina	3:26.04		8
2	Ukraine	Oleksandra Ryzhkova, Oksana Ilyushkina, Antonina Yefremova, Nataliya Pygyda	3:26.28	SB	7
3	Greece	Olga Kaidantzi, Hrisa Goudenoudi, Hariklia Bouda, Fani Halkia	3:26.33	NR	6
4	Great Britain	Christine Ohuruogu, Catherine Murphy, Helen Karagounis, Donna Fraser	3:27.22		5
5	Germany	Jana Neubert, Ulrike Urbansky, Claudia Hoffmann, Claudia Marx	3:27.38	SB	4
6	Poland	Marta Chrust, Monika Bejnar, Małgorzata Pskit, Grażyna Prokopek	3:28.10		3
7	France	Marie-Louise Bévis, Dado Kamissoko, Phara Anacharsis, Solene Désert	3:33.67	SB	2
8	Spain	Catalina Oliver, Cora Olivero, Belén Recio, Esther Desviat	3:40.47		1

=== High jump ===
20 June

Rank	Name	Nationality	1.75	1.80	1.85	1.89	1.92	1.95	2.00	2.02	2.04	2.06	Result	Notes	Points
1	Yelena Slesarenko	Russia	–	o	o	o	o	o	o	o	o	xxx	2.04		8
2	Iryna Myhalchenko	Ukraine	–	o	o	xo	xo	xxx					1.92		7
3	Ariane Friedrich	Germany	–	o	o	xo	xxo	xxx					1.92	SB	6
4	Gaëlle Niaré	France	o	o	o	o	xxx						1.89		4.5
4	Anna Ksok	Poland	o	o	o	o	xxx						1.89		4.5
6	Ruth Beitia	Spain	–	o	o	xxx							1.85		3
7	Nikolia Mitropoulou	Greece	–	o	xxx								1.80		2
8	Natalie Clark	Great Britain	xo	xxo	xxx								1.80		1

=== Pole vault ===
19 June

Rank	Name	Nationality	3.70	3.90	4.05	4.20	4.30	4.40	4.50	4.60	Result	Notes	Points
1	Anzhela Balakhonova	Ukraine	–	–	–	o	o	o	o	xxx	4.50		8
2	Monika Pyrek	Poland	–	–	–	o	–	xo	xxx		4.40		7
3	Tatyana Polnova	Russia	–	–	–	–	xo	xxx			4.30		6
4	Georgia Tsiliggiri	Greece	–	o	o	xo	xxo	xxx			4.30		5
5	Vanessa Boslak	France	–	–	o	o	xxx				4.20		4
6	Zoe Brown	Great Britain	o	o	xxx						3.90		3
7	Naroa Agirre	Spain	xo	o	xxx						3.90		2
	Carolin Hingst	Germany	–	–	–	xxx					NM		0

=== Long jump ===
20 June

Rank	Name	Nationality	#1	#2	#3	#4	Result	Notes	Points
1	Irina Simagina	Russia	x	6.91	6.78	x	6.91		8
2	Kelly Sotherton	Great Britain	6.68	x	x	x	6.68	SB	7
3	Ioanna Kafetzi	Greece	6.29	6.55	6.56	x	6.56		6
4	Kateryna Chernyavska	Ukraine	6.34	6.45w	6.44	x	6.45w		5
5	Bianca Kappler	Germany	6.19	6.43	6.22	6.39	6.43		4
6	Małgorzata Trybańska	Poland	6.29	6.40	6.21	6.29	6.40		3
7	Christelle Preau	France	6.23	6.30	6.12	5.82	6.30		2
8	Concepción Montaner	Spain	6.19	6.30	6.09	5.07	6.30		1

=== Triple jump ===
19 June

Rank	Name	Nationality	#1	#2	#3	#4	Result	Notes	Points
1	Anna Pyatykh	Russia	14.59	14.85	14.76	14.73	14.85	SB	8
2	Hrisopigi Devetzi	Greece	x	14.65	14.81w	x	14.81w		7
3	Olena Govorova	Ukraine	14.58	x	x	14.78	14.78	SB	6
4	Carlota Castrejana	Spain	13.85	14.07	14.31w	13.98w	14.31w		5
5	Liliana Zagacka	Poland	x	x	13.88	14.02	14.02		4
6	Aurelie Talbot	France	13.61	x	13.40	13.38	13.61		3
7	Silvia Otto	Germany	13.23w	x	x	13.32	13.32		2
8	Ashia Hansen	Great Britain	13.32	11.25	r		13.32	SB	1

=== Shot put ===
20 June

Rank	Name	Nationality	#1	#2	#3	#4	Result	Notes	Points
1	Olga Ryabinkina	Russia	18.40	18.92	18.60	18.54	18.92		8
2	Kalliopi Ouzouni	Greece	x	18.45	x	17.93	18.45		7
3	Nadine Kleinert	Germany	18.44	x	x	18.12	18.44		6
4	Krystyna Zabawska	Poland	18.42	17.94	x	x	18.42		5
5	Laurence Manfredi	France	18.19	18.04	17.97	18.30	18.30		4
6	Tetyana Nasonova	Ukraine	17.21	x	17.12	x	17.21		3
7	Martina De La Puente	Spain	16.75	16.77	x	x	16.77		2
8	Joanne Duncan	Great Britain	13.85	15.18	x	x	15.18		1

=== Discus throw ===
19 June

Rank	Name	Nationality	#1	#2	#3	#4	Result	Notes	Points
1	Ekaterini Voggoli	Greece	x	x	51.72	64.25	64.25		8
2	Franka Dietzsch	Germany	x	x	58.45	61.42	61.42		7
3	Joanna Wiśniewska	Poland	59.69	60.51	x	57.69	60.51		6
4	Melina Robert-Michon	France	58.62	x	x	60.49	60.49		5
5	Oksana Yesipchuk	Russia	57.36	54.42	53.88	57.75	57.75		4
6	Philippa Roles	Great Britain	58.88	x	x	57.05	57.05		3
7	Natalya Fokina	Ukraine	x	50.23	56.98	56.22	56.98		2
8	Irache Quintanal	Spain	51.30	53.12	52.25	x	53.12		1

=== Hammer throw ===
20 June

Rank	Name	Nationality	#1	#2	#3	#4	Result	Notes	Points
1	Iryna Sekachova	Ukraine	69.55	69.55	71.91	70.97	71.91		8
2	Olga Kuzenkova	Russia	69.63	70.77	70.39	70.89	70.89		7
3	Betty Heidler	Germany	66.33	70.05	68.21	69.24	70.05		6
4	Kamila Skolimowska	Poland	x	69.68	x	x	69.68		5
5	Manuela Montebrun	France	69.37	64.49	65.87	67.69	69.37		4
6	Alexandra Papageorgiou	Greece	x	x	x	65.75	65.75		3
7	Lorraine Shaw	Great Britain	x	65.30	62.24	x	65.30		2
8	Berta Castells	Spain	x	x	62.45	64.02	64.02		1

=== Javelin throw ===
19 June

Rank	Name	Nationality	#1	#2	#3	#4	Result	Notes	Points
1	Aggeliki Tsiolakoudi	Greece	62.80	x	x	56.52	62.80		8
2	Steffi Nerius	Germany	59.42	57.94	58.33	57.30	59.42		7
3	Valeriya Zabruskova	Russia	57.03	56.28	58.88	58.07	58.88		6
4	Tetyana Lyakhovych	Ukraine	55.19	56.01	55.46	58.67	58.67		4
5	Mercedes Chilla	Spain	55.52	55.21	x	56.46	56.46		4
6	Barbara Madejczyk	Poland	56.10	51.94	53.31	54.29	56.10		3
7	Goldie Sayers	Great Britain	49.04	x	47.68	52.90	52.90		2
8	Nadine Auzeil	France	50.22	49.07	47.67	x	50.22		1
