= 2006 European Athletics Championships – Men's 200 metres =

Men's 200 metres at the 2006 European Athletics Championships
- Venue: Ullevi
- Location: Gothenburg
- Dates: 9 August (heats & quarter-finals); 10 August (semi-finals & final)
- Competitors: 41 from 24 nations
- Winning time: 20.01

Medalists
gold medal	Francis Obikwelu	Portugal
silver medal	Johan Wissman	Sweden
bronze medal	Marlon Devonish	Great Britain

The men's 200 metres at the 2006 European Athletics Championships were held at the Ullevi on August 9 and August 10. Obikwelu completed the sprinters' double, leading comfortably out of the last curve and continuing all the way to the finish. Wissman took silver in a time level with the national record. Devonish faded in the end and just managed to hold on to third in front of Belgian Kristof Beyens.

== Schedule ==
Date	Time	Round
August 9, 2006	11:10	Round 1
August 9, 2006	19:35	Quarter-finals
August 10, 2006	19:15	Semi-finals
August 10, 2006	20:45	Final

== Results ==
=== Round 1 ===
Qualification: First 4 in each heat (Q) and the next 8 fastest (q) advance to the Quarter-finals.

==== Heat 1 ====
Rank	Athlete	Nation	Time	Notes
1	David Alerte	France	20.58	Q
2	Kristof Beyens	Belgium	20.61	Q, SB
3	Ruslan Abbasov	Azerbaijan	20.86	Q, NR
4	Morten Jensen	Denmark	20.94	Q
5	Panagiotis Sarris	Greece	20.99	q
6	Koura Kaba Fantoni	Italy	21.14	
7	Marco Cribari	Switzerland	21.16	
			Wind: +1.7 m/s	

==== Heat 2 ====
Rank	Athlete	Nation	Time	Notes
1	Marlon Devonish	Great Britain	20.53	Q, SB
2	Sebastian Ernst	Germany	20.67	Q, SB
3	Eddy De Lépine	France	20.70	Q, SB
4	Paul Brizzel	Ireland	20.84	Q, SB
5	Marcin Urbaś	Poland	20.87	q
6	Dmytro Hlushchenko	Ukraine	21.00	q
7	Tommi Hartonen	Finland	21.22	
			Wind: +1.8 m/s	

==== Heat 3 ====
Rank	Athlete	Nation	Time	Notes
1	Ivan Teplykh	Russia	20.71	Q, PB
2	Yordan Ilinov	Bulgaria	20.80	Q
3	Rikki Fifton	Great Britain	21.02	Q
4	Stefano Anceschi	Italy	21.04	Q
5	Patrick van Luijk	Netherlands	21.05	q
6	Johan Engberg	Sweden	21.12	
7	Ronald Pognon	France	DNS	
			Wind: +0.5 m/s	

==== Heat 4 ====
Rank	Athlete	Nation	Time	Notes
1	Anastasios Gousis	Greece	20.64	Q
2	Paul Hession	Ireland	20.81	Q
3	Alessandro Cavallaro	Italy	20.82	Q, SB
4	Caimin Douglas	Netherlands	20.97	Q
5	Marc Schneeberger	Switzerland	21.06	q
6	Vojtěch Šulc	Czech Republic	21.07	q
			Wind: -0.5 m/s	

==== Heat 5 ====
Rank	Athlete	Nation	Time	Notes
1	Francis Obikwelu	Portugal	20.78	Q
2	Roman Smirnov	Russia	20.92	Q
3	Guus Hoogmoed	Netherlands	20.93	Q
4	Tim Abeyie	Great Britain	21.03	Q
5	Josué Mena	Spain	21.09	q
6	Jan Schiller	Czech Republic	21.12	
7	Gary Ryan	Ireland	21.14	
			Wind: -1.1 m/s	

==== Heat 6 ====
Rank	Athlete	Nation	Time	Notes
1	Johan Wissman	Sweden	20.66	Q
2	Matic Osovnikar	Slovenia	20.90	Q
3	Daniel Schnelting	Germany	20.90	Q, SB
4	Jiří Vojtík	Czech Republic	20.91	Q
5	Daniel Abenzoar-Foulé	Luxembourg	20.93	q
6	Florin Suciu	Romania	21.10	
7	Josip Šoprek	Croatia	21.55	
			Wind: +0.4 m/s	

=== Quarter-finals ===
Qualification: First 4 in each heat (Q) advance to the semifinals.

==== Heat 1 ====
Rank	Athlete	Nation	Time	Notes
1	Marlon Devonish	Great Britain	20.67	Q
2	Sebastian Ernst	Germany	20.71	Q
3	Yordan Ilinov	Bulgaria	20.76	Q
4	Guus Hoogmoed	Netherlands	20.76	Q
5	Roman Smirnov	Russia	20.93	
6	Panagiotis Sarris	Greece	21.04	
7	Marcin Urbaś	Poland	21.39	
–	Stefano Anceschi	Italy	DQ	
			Wind: +0.6 m/s	

==== Heat 2 ====
Rank	Athlete	Nation	Time	Notes
1	David Alerte	France	20.68	Q
2	Kristof Beyens	Belgium	20.70	Q
3	Paul Hession	Ireland	20.80	Q
4	Jiří Vojtík	Czech Republic	20.90	Q
5	Daniel Abenzoar-Foulé	Luxembourg	20.96	
6	Ruslan Abbasov	Azerbaijan	20.98	
7	Tim Abeyie	Great Britain	21.17	
–	Marc Schneeberger	Switzerland	DNS	
			Wind: -0.1 m/s	

==== Heat 3 ====
Rank	Athlete	Nation	Time	Notes
1	Johan Wissman	Sweden	20.68	Q
2	Rikki Fifton	Great Britain	20.73	Q
3	Ivan Teplykh	Russia	20.82	Q
4	Eddy De Lépine	France	21.00	Q
5	Dmytro Hlushchenko	Ukraine	21.07	
6	Patrick van Luijk	Netherlands	21.46	
7	Morten Jensen	Denmark	21.56	
–	Daniel Schnelting	Germany	DNS	
			Wind: -0.5 m/s	

==== Heat 4 ====
Rank	Athlete	Nation	Time	Notes
1	Francis Obikwelu	Portugal	20.58	Q
2	Anastasios Gousis	Greece	20.68	Q
3	Matic Osovnikar	Slovenia	20.85	Q
4	Alessandro Cavallaro	Italy	20.91	Q
5	Josué Mena	Spain	21.09	
6	Caimin Douglas	Netherlands	21.18	
7	Vojtěch Šulc	Czech Republic	21.21	
–	Paul Brizzel	Ireland	DNF	
			Wind: -0.7 m/s	

=== Semi-finals ===
First 4 of each Semifinal will be directly qualified (Q) for the Final.

==== Heat 1 ====
Rank	Lane	Name	Nationality	Time	Notes
1	3	Francis Obikwelu	Portugal	20.36	Q
2	6	Johan Wissman	Sweden	20.38	Q, NR
3	7	Eddy De Lépine	France	20.70	Q, SB
4	5	Anastasios Gousis	Greece	20.76	Q
5	8	Guus Hoogmoed	Netherlands	20.80	
6	4	Rikki Fifton	Great Britain	20.85	
7	2	Yordan Ilinov	Bulgaria	21.00	
8	1	Matic Osovnikar	Slovenia	21.08	

==== Heat 2 ====
Rank	Lane	Name	Nationality	Time	Notes
1	4	Marlon Devonish	Great Britain	20.60	Q
2	3	Kristof Beyens	Belgium	20.62	Q
3	5	David Alerte	France	20.69	Q
4	1	Ivan Teplykh	Russia	20.82	Q
5	7	Jiří Vojtík	Czech Republic	20.83	
6	6	Sebastian Ernst	Germany	21.04	
7	2	Paul Hession	Ireland	21.09	
8	8	Alessandro Cavallaro	Italy	21.19	

=== Final ===
Rank	Lane	Name	Nationality	Time	Notes
1st place, gold medalist(s)	5	Francis Obikwelu	Portugal	20.01	NR, EL
2nd place, silver medalist(s)	4	Johan Wissman	Sweden	20.38	=NR
3rd place, bronze medalist(s)	3	Marlon Devonish	Great Britain	20.54	
4	6	Kristof Beyens	Belgium	20.57	SB
5	1	Ivan Teplykh	Russia	20.76	
6	7	Eddy De Lépine	France	20.77	
7	2	David Alerte	France	20.93	
8	8	Anastasios Gousis	Greece	20.94	
