= 2005 European Athletics U23 Championships – Men's 4 × 100 metres relay =

The men's 4 x 100 metres relay event at the 2005 European Athletics U23 Championships was held in Erfurt, Germany, at Steigerwaldstadion on 17 July.

== Medalists ==
Gold	Oudéré Kankarafou; Idrissa M'Barke; Eddy De Lépine; David Alerte; France
Silver	Florian Rentz; Marius Broening; Sebastian Ernst; Till Helmke; Germany
Bronze	Rosario La Mastra; Alessandro Rocco; Stefano Anceschi; Koura Kaba Fantoni; Italy

== Results ==
=== Final ===
17 July

Rank	Nation	Competitors	Time	Notes
1st place, gold medalist(s)	France	Oudéré Kankarafou; Idrissa M'Barke; Eddy De Lépine; David Alerte	38.95	CR
2nd place, silver medalist(s)	Germany	Florian Rentz; Marius Broening; Sebastian Ernst; Till Helmke	39.12	
3rd place, bronze medalist(s)	Italy	Rosario La Mastra; Alessandro Rocco; Stefano Anceschi; Koura Kaba Fantoni	39.41	
4	Great Britain	Andrew Matthews; James Ellington; Rikki Fifton; Leon Baptiste	39.45	
5	Poland	Kamil Masztak; Piotr Wiaderek; Adam Gaj; Michał Bielczyk	39.64	
6	Belgium	Tom Schippers; Mathieu Schoeps; Damien Broothaerts; Daniel Baerts	40.45	
	Spain	Alain López; José María García-Borreguero; Álvaro Aljarilla; Iván Mocholí	DQ	IAAF rule 170.13

== Participation ==
According to an unofficial count, 28 athletes from 7 countries participated in the event.

- Belgium (4)
- France (4)
- Great Britain (4)
- Germany (4)
- Italy (4)
- Poland (4)
- Spain (4)
