= Athletics at the 2005 Summer Universiade – Men's 4 × 100 metres relay =

The men's 4 × 100 metres relay event at the 2005 Summer Universiade was held on 19–20 August in İzmir, Turkey.

== Medalists ==
Gold	Silver	Bronze
Italy; Luca Verdecchia; Alessandro Rocco; Massimiliano Donati; Stefano Anceschi	Japan; Kazuya Kitamura; Masaya Aikawa; Masaya Minami; Shinji Takahira	Great Britain; Gavin Eastman; Tyrone Edgar; Darren Chin; Tim Abeyie

== Results ==
=== Heats ===
Rank	Heat	Nation	Athletes	Time	Notes
1	3	Italy	Luca Verdecchia, Alessandro Rocco, Massimiliano Donati, Stefano Anceschi	39.78	Q
2	3	Russia	Igor Gostev, Mikhail Yegorychev, Ivan Teplykh, Maksim Mokrousov	39.82	Q
3	3	Nigeria	Onyeabor Ngwogu, Bamise Adegboyega, Ahmed Ajiboye, Peter Emelieze	39.97	q
4	1	Japan	Kazuya Kitamura, Masaya Aikawa, Masaya Minami, Shinji Takahira	39.99	Q
5	1	Estonia	Argo Golberg, Henri Sool, Martin Vihmann, Tarmo Jallai	40.06	Q
6	1	China	Wang Xiaoxu, Jin Ke, Du Bing, Hu Kai	40.15	q
7	2	Germany	Florian Seibold, Till Helmke, Marius Broening, Peter Rapp	40.15	Q
8	2	Great Britain	Gavin Eastman, Tyrone Edgar, Darren Chin, Tim Abeyie	40.23	Q
9	2	South Africa	Snyman Prinsloo, Yaw Fosu-Amoah, Leigh Julius, Hennie Kotze	40.42	
10	2	Chinese Taipei	Lin Yi-wei, Cheng Ming-sheng, Wang Shi-wen, Liu Yuan-kai	40.83	
11	3	Canada	Anthony Garber, Neville Wright, Nathan Vadeboncoeur, Neil Hurtubise	40.85	
12	1	Brazil	Thiago Branco, Luis Eduardo Ambrósio, Fernando dos Reis, Sandro Viana	41.01	
13	3	Namibia	Christie van Wyk, Roger Haitengi, Elton Garus-Oab, Jasson Linekela	41.18	
14	2	Turkey	İsmail Aslan, Oytun Gören, Mustafa Delioğlu, Hakan Karacaoğlu	41.39	
15	3	Senegal	Moussa Baldé, Séléké Samake, Alassane Diallo, Katim Touré	41.42	
16	1	Hong Kong	Fan Wai Ho, Szeto Man Ho, Lui Ka Ho, Lai Ka Pun	41.81	
17	1	Macau	Leong Kin Kuan, Lam Cheng Fu, Lei Ka In, Chao Un Kai	42.61	
18	2	Uganda	Isaac Nabaasa, Andrew Opata, Julius Kasule, Raymond Diogo	42.90	
19	1	Lebanon	Marc Habib, Haykal Moussallem, Joseph Kharrat, Mohamed Tamin	43.64	
	2	Thailand	Siriroj Darasuriyong, Wachara Sondee, Sittichai Suwonprateep, Sompote Suwannarangsri	DNF	
	3	Bulgaria	Yordan Yovchev, Svetoslav Stanev, Stanislav Knezhanski, Miroslav Shishkov	DQ	

=== Final ===
Rank	Nation	Athletes	Time	Notes
1st place, gold medalist(s)	Italy	Luca Verdecchia, Alessandro Rocco, Massimiliano Donati, Stefano Anceschi	39.25	
2nd place, silver medalist(s)	Japan	Kazuya Kitamura, Masaya Aikawa, Masaya Minami, Shinji Takahira	39.29	
3rd place, bronze medalist(s)	Great Britain	Gavin Eastman, Tyrone Edgar, Darren Chin, Tim Abeyie	39.41	
4	China	Wang Xiaoxu, Jin Ke, Du Bing, Hu Kai	39.45	
5	Russia	Igor Gostev, Mikhail Yegorychev, Ivan Teplykh, Andrey Yepishin	39.61	
6	Nigeria	Onyeabor Ngwogu, Bamise Adegboyega, Ahmed Ajiboye, Peter Emelieze	39.84	
7	Germany	Florian Seibold, Till Helmke, Marius Broening, Peter Rapp	39.86	
	Estonia	Argo Golberg, Henri Sool, Martin Vihmann, Tarmo Jallai	DNF	
