= 2005 European Athletics U23 Championships – Men's 100 metres =

The men's 100 metres event at the 2005 European Athletics U23 Championships was held in Erfurt, Germany, at Steigerwaldstadion on 14 and 16 July.

== Medalists ==
Gold	Oudéré Kankarafou; France
Silver	Eddy De Lépine; France
Bronze	Stefan Wieser; Germany

== Results ==
=== Final ===
16 July
Wind: 2.4 m/s

Rank	Name	Nationality	Time	Notes
1st place, gold medalist(s)	Oudéré Kankarafou	France	10.26 w	
2nd place, silver medalist(s)	Eddy De Lépine	France	10.30 w	
3rd place, bronze medalist(s)	Stefan Wieser	Germany	10.32 w	
4	Koura Kaba Fantoni	Italy	10.34 w	
5	James Ellington	United Kingdom	10.35 w	
6	Marius Broening	Germany	10.39 w	
7	Adam Gaj	Poland	10.43 w	
8	Andrew Matthews	United Kingdom	10.52 w	

=== Heats ===
14 July
Qualified: first 3 in each heat and 2 best to the Final

==== Heat 1 ====
Wind: -0.9 m/s

Rank	Name	Nationality	Time	Notes
1	James Ellington	United Kingdom	10.42	Q
2	Koura Kaba Fantoni	Italy	10.50	Q
3	Stefan Wieser	Germany	10.52	Q
4	Eddy De Lépine	France	10.52	q
5	Adam Gaj	Poland	10.60	q
6	Stefano Anceschi	Italy	10.62	
7	Jarosław Wasiak	Poland	10.69	
8	Péter Miklós	Hungary	10.79	

==== Heat 2 ====
Wind: -2.0 m/s

Rank	Name	Nationality	Time	Notes
1	Oudéré Kankarafou	France	10.52	Q
2	Marius Broening	Germany	10.56	Q
3	Andrew Matthews	United Kingdom	10.59	Q
4	Alessandro Rocco	Italy	10.60	
5	Michał Bielczyk	Poland	10.64	
6	Christophe Bonnet	France	10.82	
7	Iván Mocholí	Spain	10.87	
	Kristof Beyens	Belgium	DNF	

== Participation ==
According to an unofficial count, 16 athletes from 8 countries participated in the event.

- Belgium (1)
- France (3)
- Germany (2)
- Hungary (1)
- Italy (3)
- Poland (3)
- Spain (1)
- United Kingdom (2)
