= Athletics at the 2005 Summer Universiade – Men's 100 metres =

The men's 100 metres event at the 2005 Summer Universiade was held on 15–16 August in İzmir, Turkey.

== Medalists ==
Gold	Silver	Bronze
Hu Kai; China	Andrey Yepishin; Russia	Sandro Viana; Brazil

== Results ==
=== Heats ===
Wind:
Heat 1: -0.9 m/s, Heat 2: -0.2 m/s, Heat 3: +1.3 m/s, Heat 4: +0.3 m/s, Heat 5: -0.2 m/s, Heat 6: +1.1 m/s
Heat 7: -1.3 m/s, Heat 8: -0.3 m/s, Heat 9: +0.8 m/s, Heat 10: -0.1 m/s, Heat 11: -0.9 m/s

Rank	Heat	Athlete	Nationality	Time	Notes
1	3	Andrey Yepishin	Russia	10.44	Q
2	8	Christie van Wyk	Namibia	10.45	Q, SB
2	10	Tyrone Edgar	Great Britain	10.45	Q
4	6	Masaya Aikawa	Japan	10.48	Q
5	1	Emanuel Parris	Canada	10.52	Q
5	4	Igor Gostev	Russia	10.52	Q
7	2	Peter Emelieze	Nigeria	10.53	Q
7	4	Hu Kai	China	10.53	Q
9	4	Wachara Sondee	Thailand	10.54	Q
9	8	Snyman Prinsloo	South Africa	10.54	Q
11	6	Neville Wright	Canada	10.55	Q, SB
12	6	Kostyantyn Vasyukov	Ukraine	10.58	Q
13	5	Marius Broening	Germany	10.59	Q
14	2	Liu Yuan-Kai	Chinese Taipei	10.60	Q
15	6	Jeon Duk-Hyung	South Korea	10.60	q
16	10	Alessandro Rocco	Italy	10.61	Q
16	11	Onyeabor Ngwogu	Nigeria	10.61	Q
18	7	Sandro Viana	Brazil	10.62	Q
18	8	Orion Nicely	Jamaica	10.62	Q
18	11	Gavin Eastman	Great Britain	10.62	Q
21	3	Kenta Wakasaki	Japan	10.63	Q
21	5	Matjaž Borovina	Slovenia	10.63	Q
21	9	Marc Schneeberger	Switzerland	10.63	Q, SB
24	5	Tal Mor	Israel	10.66	Q
25	1	Stefano Anceschi	Italy	10.67	Q
26	3	Thierry Adanabou	Burkina Faso	10.68	Q, SB
26	7	İsmail Aslan	Turkey	10.68	Q
26	10	Andrew Moore	New Zealand	10.68	Q
29	4	Miroslav Shishkov	Bulgaria	10.70	q, SB
30	11	Tshepang Tshube	Botswana	10.72	Q, SB
31	9	Attila Farkas	Hungary	10.73	Q
31	9	Ron Richards	Liberia	10.73	Q
33	3	Yordan Yovchev	Bulgaria	10.74	q, SB
34	3	Lui Ka Ho	Hong Kong	10.76	q
34	9	Boštjan Fridrih	Slovenia	10.76	q
36	5	Jesús Domínguez	Mexico	10.77	q
37	6	Moussa Baldé	Senegal	10.77	q
38	10	Prabashitha Caldera	Sri Lanka	10.80	
39	9	Fernando dos Reis	Brazil	10.82	
40	7	Lin Yi-Wei	Chinese Taipei	10.83	Q
41	3	Pirom Autas	Thailand	10.84	SB
41	9	Argo Golberg	Estonia	10.84	
43	6	Mustafa Delioğlu	Turkey	10.85	
44	2	Evaggelos Halastaras	Greece	10.89	Q
45	11	Lai Ka Pun	Hong Kong	10.90	
46	11	Chao Un Kei	Macau	10.91	PB
47	8	Craig Bearda	New Zealand	10.92	
48	1	Jasson Linekela	Namibia	10.94	Q
49	7	Katim Touré	Senegal	10.98	
50	7	Mohammad Talha Iftikhar	Pakistan	11.05	
51	11	Alain Olivier Nyoumai	Cameroon	11.06	
52	4	Joseph Kharrat	Lebanon	11.07	
53	4	Lei Ka In	Macau	11.10	
54	5	Eric Marende	Kenya	11.12	
55	11	Hassen Taresh	Iraq	11.21	
56	10	Boikaego Ennetse	Botswana	11.32	
57	8	Neal Borg	Malta	11.39	
58	5	Julius Kasule	Uganda	11.44	
59	8	Haykal Moussallem	Lebanon	11.46	
60	2	Félix Moulanier	Panama	11.73	
61	5	Edward Mkandawire	Malawi	11.84	
62	5	Niaina Andrianjatovo	Madagascar	12.16	
63	1	Achirov Abdel Basti	Benin	12.42	
64	11	Wissam Ehmaib	Libya	13.65	

=== Quarterfinals ===
Wind:
Heat 1: -2.2 m/s, Heat 2: +0.6 m/s, Heat 3: +0.2 m/s, Heat 4: +0.8 m/s, Heat 5: 0.0 m/s

Rank	Heat	Athlete	Nationality	Time	Notes
1	5	Tyrone Edgar	Great Britain	10.37	Q
2	3	Andrey Yepishin	Russia	10.38	Q
3	3	Sandro Viana	Brazil	10.47	Q
4	4	Christie van Wyk	Namibia	10.48	Q
5	1	Masaya Aikawa	Japan	10.50	Q
5	1	Wachara Sondee	Thailand	10.50	Q
5	4	Hu Kai	China	10.50	Q
8	2	Emanuel Parris	Canada	10.51	Q
8	3	Stefano Anceschi	Italy	10.51	Q
10	5	Snyman Prinsloo	South Africa	10.52	Q
11	1	Gavin Eastman	Great Britain	10.54	Q
11	4	Attila Farkas	Hungary	10.54	Q
11	5	Marius Broening	Germany	10.54	Q
14	1	Jeon Duk-Hyung	South Korea	10.55	q
15	1	Peter Emelieze	Nigeria	10.57	
15	5	Kenta Wakasaki	Japan	10.57	
17	2	Igor Gostev	Russia	10.58	Q
18	4	Onyeabor Ngwogu	Nigeria	10.59	PB
19	2	Kostyantyn Vasyukov	Ukraine	10.60	Q
20	2	Orion Nicely	Jamaica	10.60	
21	1	Neville Wright	Canada	10.65	
21	2	Alessandro Rocco	Italy	10.65	
23	1	Tal Mor	Israel	10.71	
23	4	Andrew Moore	New Zealand	10.71	
25	3	İsmail Aslan	Turkey	10.72	
25	5	Lui Ka Ho	Hong Kong	10.72	PB
27	2	Liu Yuan-Kai	Chinese Taipei	10.73	
28	3	Moussa Baldé	Senegal	10.74	
28	4	Matjaž Borovina	Slovenia	10.74	
28	5	Ron Richards	Liberia	10.74	
31	3	Lin Yi-Wei	Chinese Taipei	10.76	
32	1	Yordan Yovchev	Bulgaria	10.78	
33	5	Thierry Adanabou	Burkina Faso	10.81	
33	5	Jasson Linekela	Namibia	10.81	SB
35	3	Marc Schneeberger	Switzerland	10.85	
35	4	Jesús Domínguez	Mexico	10.85	
37	4	Evaggelos Halastaras	Greece	10.87	
38	2	Boštjan Fridrih	Slovenia	10.88	
39	3	Tshepang Tshube	Botswana	10.93	
	2	Miroslav Shishkov	Bulgaria	DQ	

=== Semifinals ===
Wind:
Heat 1: -0.4 m/s, Heat 2: -1.1 m/s

Rank	Heat	Athlete	Nationality	Time	Notes
1	2	Gavin Eastman	Great Britain	10.52	Q
2	2	Sandro Viana	Brazil	10.58	Q
3	2	Andrey Yepishin	Russia	10.59	Q
4	2	Stefano Anceschi	Italy	10.60	Q
5	1	Hu Kai	China	10.62	Q
6	2	Emanuel Parris	Canada	10.64	
7	1	Masaya Aikawa	Japan	10.66	Q
8	1	Wachara Sondee	Thailand	10.67	Q
8	2	Christie van Wyk	Namibia	10.67	
10	1	Snyman Prinsloo	South Africa	10.71	Q
11	1	Tyrone Edgar	Great Britain	10.72	
12	1	Igor Gostev	Russia	10.74	
13	1	Attila Farkas	Hungary	10.79	
14	1	Jeon Duk-Hyung	South Korea	10.82	
15	2	Kostyantyn Vasyukov	Ukraine	10.87	
	2	Marius Broening	Germany	DNS	

=== Final ===
Wind: +0.7 m/s

Rank	Athlete	Nationality	Time	Notes
1st place, gold medalist(s)	Hu Kai	China	10.30	
2nd place, silver medalist(s)	Andrey Yepishin	Russia	10.43	
3rd place, bronze medalist(s)	Sandro Viana	Brazil	10.49	
4	Gavin Eastman	Great Britain	10.50	
5	Stefano Anceschi	Italy	10.57	
6	Wachara Sondee	Thailand	10.58	
7	Masaya Aikawa	Japan	10.63	
8	Snyman Prinsloo	South Africa	10.64	
