= 2005 European Athletics U23 Championships – Men's 200 metres =

The men's 200 metres event at the 2005 European Athletics U23 Championships was held in Erfurt, Germany, at Steigerwaldstadion on 15 and 17 July.

== Medalists ==
Gold	David Alerte; France
Silver	Sebastian Ernst; Germany
Bronze	Koura Kaba Fantoni; Italy

== Results ==
=== Final ===
17 July
Wind: 1.3 m/s

Rank	Name	Nationality	Time	Notes
1st place, gold medalist(s)	David Alerte	France	20.47	
2nd place, silver medalist(s)	Sebastian Ernst	Germany	20.58	
3rd place, bronze medalist(s)	Koura Kaba Fantoni	Italy	20.71	
4	Rikki Fifton	United Kingdom	20.73	
5	Till Helmke	Germany	20.78	
6	Yordan Ilinov	Bulgaria	20.78	
7	Florin Suciu	Romania	20.88	
8	Idrissa M'Barke	France	21.13	

=== Heats ===
15 July
Qualified: first 2 in each heat and 2 best to the Final

==== Heat 1 ====
Wind: 0.1 m/s

Rank	Name	Nationality	Time	Notes
1	Till Helmke	Germany	20.76	Q
2	Yordan Ilinov	Bulgaria	20.91	Q
3	Ivan Teplykh	Russia	21.12	
4	Kamil Masztak	Poland	21.14	
5	Manuel Nivollet	France	21.34	

==== Heat 2 ====
Wind: 0.2 m/s

Rank	Name	Nationality	Time	Notes
1	Sebastian Ernst	Germany	20.54	Q
2	Koura Kaba Fantoni	Italy	20.79	Q
3	Rikki Fifton	United Kingdom	20.81	q
4	Idrissa M'Barke	France	21.08	q
5	Piotr Wiaderek	Poland	21.33	
6	Rudolf Götz	Czech Republic	21.35	

==== Heat 3 ====
Wind: -0.8 m/s

Rank	Name	Nationality	Time	Notes
1	David Alerte	France	20.69	Q
2	Florin Suciu	Romania	20.91	Q
3	Florian Rentz	Germany	21.23	
4	Paweł Ptak	Poland	21.36	
5	José María García-Borreguero	Spain	21.53	
6	Valentin Bulychov	Azerbaijan	21.92	

== Participation ==
According to an unofficial count, 17 athletes from 11 countries participated in the event.

- Azerbaijan (1)
- Bulgaria (1)
- Czech Republic (1)
- France (3)
- Germany (3)
- Italy (1)
- Poland (3)
- Romania (1)
- Russia (1)
- Spain (1)
- United Kingdom (1)
