= 2002 World Junior Championships in Athletics – Men's 200 metres =

The men's 200 metres event at the 2002 World Junior Championships in Athletics was held in Kingston, Jamaica, at National Stadium on 18 and 19 July.

== Medalists ==
Gold	Usain Bolt; Jamaica
Silver	Brendan Christian; Antigua and Barbuda
Bronze	Wes Felix; United States

== Results ==
=== Final ===
19 July
Wind: +0.9 m/s

Rank	Name	Nationality	Time	Notes
1st place, gold medalist(s)	Usain Bolt	Jamaica	20.61	
2nd place, silver medalist(s)	Brendan Christian	Antigua and Barbuda	20.74	
3rd place, bronze medalist(s)	Wes Felix	United States	20.82	
4	Rubin Williams	United States	20.90	
5	Bruno Pacheco	Brazil	20.95	
6	Sebastian Ernst	Germany	21.00	
7	Till Helmke	Germany	21.10	
	Grafton Ifill	Bahamas	DNF	

=== Semifinals ===
19 July

==== Semifinal 1 ====
Wind: -1.1 m/s

Rank	Name	Nationality	Time	Notes
1	Grafton Ifill	Bahamas	21.02	Q
2	Rubin Williams	United States	21.07	Q
3	Sebastian Ernst	Germany	21.09	q
4	Tyler Christopher	Canada	21.20	
5	Kristof Beyens	Belgium	21.22	
6	Paul Hession	Ireland	21.22	
7	Daisuke Sakai	Japan	21.56	
8	Tamunosiki Atorudibo	Nigeria	21.58	

==== Semifinal 2 ====
Wind: -2.5 m/s

Rank	Name	Nationality	Time	Notes
1	Usain Bolt	Jamaica	20.85	Q
2	Brendan Christian	Antigua and Barbuda	21.04	Q
3	Bruno Pacheco	Brazil	21.16	q
4	Adam Miller	Australia	21.39	
5	Ricardo Pacheco	Portugal	21.47	
6	Dániel Ágoston	Hungary	21.60	
7	Ivor-Tit Jurisic	Croatia	21.80	
8	Paweł Ptak	Poland	21.91	

==== Semifinal 3 ====
Wind: -4.1 m/s

Rank	Name	Nationality	Time	Notes
1	Wes Felix	United States	21.50	Q
2	Till Helmke	Germany	21.65	Q
3	Kazuteru Matsumoto	Japan	21.66	
4	Roman Smirnov	Russia	21.74	
5	Jorge Sena	Brazil	21.77	
6	Leigh Julius	South Africa	21.83	
7	Cédrick Audel	France	21.92	
8	Robert Majchrzak	Poland	21.95	

=== Heats ===
18 July

==== Heat 1 ====
Wind: +1.6 m/s

Rank	Name	Nationality	Time	Notes
1	Brendan Christian	Antigua and Barbuda	21.09	Q
2	Roman Smirnov	Russia	21.18	Q
3	Daisuke Sakai	Japan	21.25	Q
4	Ivor-Tit Jurisic	Croatia	21.43	q
5	José María García	Spain	21.48	
6	Ku King Kit	Hong Kong	22.19	
7	Abdulkarem Abdulkarem	Bahrain	22.96	

==== Heat 2 ====
Wind: +1.3 m/s

Rank	Name	Nationality	Time	Notes
1	Grafton Ifill	Bahamas	21.05	Q
2	Rubin Williams	United States	21.06	Q
3	Dániel Ágoston	Hungary	21.31	Q
4	Kapena Rukero	Namibia	21.44	
5	David Alerte	France	21.67	
6	Hayden Townsend	New Zealand	21.92	
7	Elio Gijon	Mexico	22.82	

==== Heat 3 ====
Wind: +1.0 m/s

Rank	Name	Nationality	Time	Notes
1	Tyler Christopher	Canada	21.03	Q
2	Kazuteru Matsumoto	Japan	21.16	Q
3	Ricardo Pacheco	Portugal	21.34	Q
4	Jeon Deok-Hyung	South Korea	21.54	
5	John Valoyes	Colombia	21.62	
6	Ahmed Mohamed Ali	Egypt	21.83	
7	Jone Biutilodoni	Fiji	22.91	

==== Heat 4 ====
Wind: +1.4 m/s

Rank	Name	Nationality	Time	Notes
1	Usain Bolt	Jamaica	20.58	Q
2	Sebastian Ernst	Germany	20.97	Q
3	Paul Hession	Ireland	21.03	Q
4	Kristof Beyens	Belgium	21.19	q
5	Tiarison Manandaza	Madagascar	22.20	
6	Khalid Brooks	Anguilla	23.39	
	Denis Kondratyev	Kazakhstan	DNF	

==== Heat 5 ====
Wind: +0.9 m/s

Rank	Name	Nationality	Time	Notes
1	Bruno Pacheco	Brazil	21.19	Q
2	Paweł Ptak	Poland	21.58	Q
3	Tamunosiki Atorudibo	Nigeria	21.61	Q
4	Kris Neofytou	Australia	21.76	
5	Darian Forbes	Turks and Caicos Islands	22.36	
6	Thulasizwe Mnisi	Swaziland	23.03	

==== Heat 6 ====
Wind: +1.1 m/s

Rank	Name	Nationality	Time	Notes
1	Till Helmke	Germany	20.97	Q
2	Jorge Sena	Brazil	21.28	Q
3	Cédrick Audel	France	21.53	Q
4	Robert Ibeh	Cayman Islands	21.71	
5	Andrés Rodríguez	Panama	23.54	
6	Enrique Cristobal Ndong	Equatorial Guinea	25.10	

==== Heat 7 ====
Wind: +1.5 m/s

Rank	Name	Nationality	Time	Notes
1	Wes Felix	United States	21.08	Q
2	Adam Miller	Australia	21.23	Q
3	Leigh Julius	South Africa	21.29	Q
4	Robert Majchrzak	Poland	21.36	q
5	Jaysuma Saidy Ndure	Gambia	21.53	
6	Darragh Graham	Ireland	21.78	
7	Emmanuel Ngom	Cameroon	21.81	

== Participation ==
According to an unofficial count, 47 athletes from 39 countries participated in the event.

- Anguilla (1)
- Antigua and Barbuda (1)
- Australia (2)
- Bahamas (1)
- Bahrain (1)
- Belgium (1)
- Brazil (2)
- Cameroon (1)
- Canada (1)
- Cayman Islands (1)
- Colombia (1)
- Croatia (1)
- Egypt (1)
- Equatorial Guinea (1)
- Fiji (1)
- France (2)
- Gambia (1)
- Germany (2)
- Hong Kong (1)
- Hungary (1)
- Ireland (2)
- Jamaica (1)
- Japan (2)
- Kazakhstan (1)
- Madagascar (1)
- Mexico (1)
- Namibia (1)
- New Zealand (1)
- Nigeria (1)
- Panama (1)
- Poland (2)
- Portugal (1)
- Russia (1)
- South Africa (1)
- South Korea (1)
- Spain (1)
- Swaziland (1)
- Turks and Caicos Islands (1)
- United States (2)
