= Piotr Wiaderek =

Polish sprinter

Personal information
- Nationality: Poland
- Born: 5 February 1984 (age 42)
- Height: 1.85 m (6 ft 1 in)
- Weight: 78 kg (172 lb)

Sport
- Sport: Athletics
- Event: 400 metres
- Club: AZS AWFiS Gdańsk

Piotr Wiaderek (born 5 February 1984 in Rymań) is a Polish sprinter. He competed in the 4 × 400 m relay event at the 2012 Summer Olympics. He was earlier a reserve relay member at the 2008 Summer Olympics but was ultimately not selected to run.

== Competition record ==
Year	Competition	Venue	Position	Event	Notes
Representing Poland
2003	European Junior Championships	Tampere, Finland	5th	4 × 100 m relay	41.20
2005	European U23 Championships	Erfurt, Germany	12th (h)	200m	21.33 (wind: +0.2 m/s)
2005	European U23 Championships	Erfurt, Germany	5th	4 × 100 m relay	39.64
2010	European Championships	Barcelona, Spain	26th (h)	200 m	21.20
2011	World Championships	Daegu, South Korea	11th (h)	4 × 400 m relay	3:01.84
2012	European Championships	Helsinki, Finland	11th (sf)	400 m	46.45
2012	European Championships	Helsinki, Finland	4th	4 × 400 m relay	3:02.37
2012	Olympic Games	London, United Kingdom	9th (h)	4 × 400 m relay	3:02.86

== Personal bests ==
Outdoor

- 100 metres - 10.42 (2010)
- 200 metres - 20.84 (2011)
- 400 metres - 45.46 (2012)

Indoor

- 60 metres - 6.80 (2006)
- 200 metres - 21.37 (2010)
- 400 metres - 48.06 (2009)
