= Ivan Teplykh =

Russian sprinter

Ivan Vladimirovich Teplykh (Russian: Иван Владимирович Теплых; born 8 February 1985 in Pervouralsk) is a Russian sprinter. He finished fifth in the 200m final at the 2006 European Athletics Championships in Gothenburg.

== International competitions ==
Representing Russia
Year	Competition	Venue	Position	Event	Notes
2004	World Junior Championships	Grosseto, Italy	9th (sf)	200m	21.12 (wind: +1.0 m/s)
2005	Universiade	İzmir, Turkey	15th (sf)	200 m	21.54
2005	Universiade	İzmir, Turkey	5th	4 × 100 m relay	39.61
2005	European U23 Championships	Erfurt, Germany	9th (h)	200m	21.12 (wind: +0.1 m/s)
2006	European Championships	Gothenburg, Sweden	5th	200 metres	20.76
2006	European Championships	Gothenburg, Sweden	4th	4 × 100 m relay	39.29
2007	World Championships	Osaka, Japan	27th (qf)	200 m	20.98
2007	World Championships	Osaka, Japan	12th (h)	4 × 100 m relay	39.08
2009	Universiade	Belgrade, Serbia	13th (sf)	200 m	21.19
2009	Universiade	Belgrade, Serbia	1st	4 × 100 m relay	39.21
