= Iván Mocholí =

Spanish sprinter

Personal information
- Born: 1 September 1983 (age 42) Picassent, Valencia, Spain
- Height: 1.72 m (5 ft 8 in)
- Weight: 74 kg (163 lb)

Sport
- Sport: Athletics
- Event(s): 60 m, 100 m
- Club: Valencia Terra i Mar
- Coached by: Rafael Blanquer

Iván Mocholí Calabuig (born 1 September 1983) is a former Spanish sprinter who competed primarily in the 60 and 100 metres. He represented his country at the 2006 and 2010 World Indoor Championships.

== International competitions ==
Year	Competition	Venue	Position	Event	Notes
Representing Spain
2004	Ibero-American Championships	Huelva, Spain	10th (h)	100 m	10.77
2004	Ibero-American Championships	Huelva, Spain	2nd	4 × 100 m relay	39.70
2005	European U23 Championships	Erfurt, Germany	15th (h)	100 m	10.87
2005	European U23 Championships	Erfurt, Germany	–	4 × 100 m relay	DQ
2006	World Indoor Championships	Moscow, Russia	19th (sf)	60 m	6.75
2006	Ibero-American Championships	Ponce, Puerto Rico	11th (h)	100 m	10.80
2006	European Championships	Gothenburg, Sweden	30th (qf)	100 m	10.67
2006	European Championships	Gothenburg, Sweden	–	4 × 100 m relay	DQ
2007	European Indoor Championships	Birmingham, United Kingdom	22nd (h)	60 m	6.81
2009	European Indoor Championships	Turin, Italy	15th (sf)	60 m	6.77
2010	World Indoor Championships	Doha, Qatar	29th (h)	60 m	6.79
2010	Ibero-American Championships	San Fernando, Spain	11th (h)	4 × 100 m relay	39.45
2011	European Indoor Championships	Paris, France	15th (sf)	60 m	6.71

== Personal bests ==
Outdoor

- 100 metres – 10.39 (+1.8 m/s, Vitoria 2004)
- 200 metres – 21.08 (0.0 m/s, Soria 2004)

Indoor

- 60 metres – 6.68 (San Sebastián 2006)
- 200 metres – 21.30 (Valencia 2004)
