= Amy Harris (sprinter) =

Australian sprinter

Amy Harris (born 7 October 1980) is a track and field sprinter from Australia.

She competed in the 2003 World Championships in Athletics – Women's 4 × 100 metres relay, in which the team was placed 6th in heat 2, and in the 2002–03 Australian Athletics Championships 100 metres, in which she won bronze.
