= Stefano Anceschi =

Italian sprinter (born 1984)

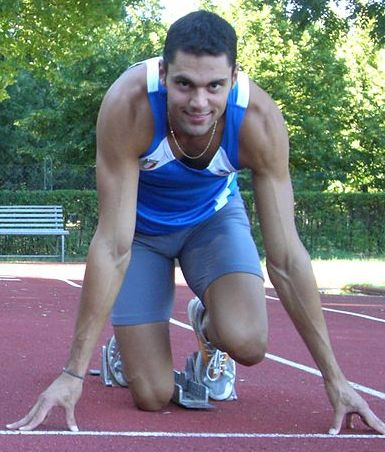

Personal information
- National team: Italy
- Born: 18 June 1984 (age 42) Scandiano, Italy
- Height: 1.93 m (6 ft 4 in)
- Weight: 86 kg (190 lb)

Sport
- Sport: Athletics
- Event: Sprint
- Club: Atletica Riccardi; G.S. Fiamme Gialle

Achievements and titles
- Personal bests: 100 m: 10.37 (2006); 200 m: 20.86 (2006)
Medal record
Summer Universiade
Gold medal – first place	2005 İzmir	4x100 metres relay
European U23 Championships
Bronze medal – third place	2005 Erfurt	4x100 metres relay

Stefano Anceschi (born 18 June 1984) is an Italian former sprinter.

== Biography ==
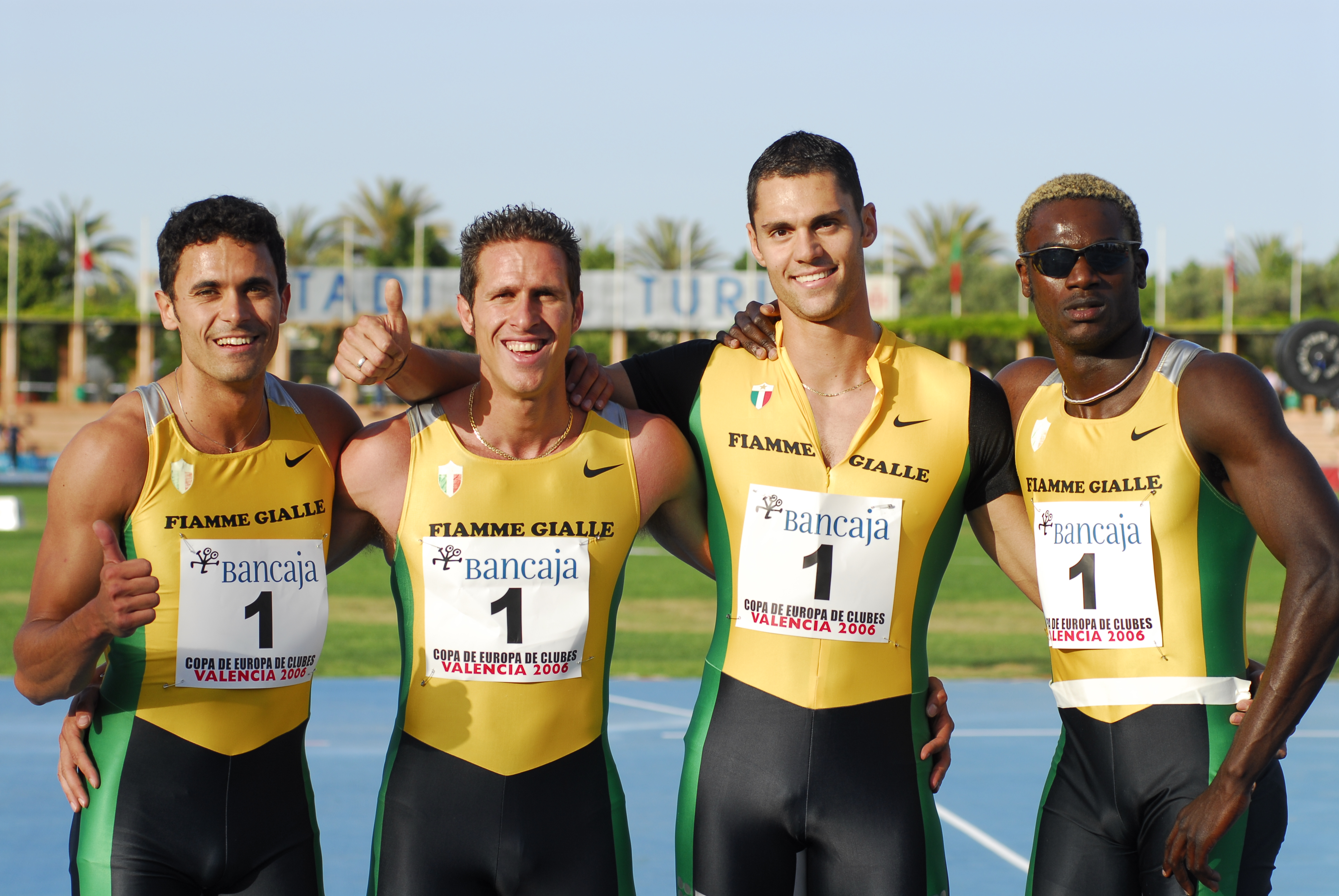
Anceschi (second from right) with the Fiamme Gialle 4 × 100 m relay team.

Anceschi was born in Scandiano. His best results at international level came with the Italian national relay team. He won six Italian youth championships before being recruited by Fiamme Gialle in 2003, having previously competed for the Reggio Event's track and field club. Early in his career he trained alongside Andrea Giaconi and Silvia Cucchi; from 2004 he became a training partner and clubmate of Giaconi. In early 2005 he was sidelined by an injury to his right scaphoid bone. After deciding against surgery, he managed to keep the pain under control and went on to make notable progress, particularly over 200 metres. That same year he won bronze at the European U23 Championships in Erfurt and, at the Universiade in İzmir, finished 5th in the 100 m and won gold in the 4 × 100 m relay.

In 2006 he won the Italian national title in the 200 metres in Turin, with a time of 20.86. He earned a place in the Italian national 4 × 100 m relay squad, showing good form as second leg. He competed at the European Championships in Gothenburg in both the 200 m and the 4×100 metres relay. In the 200 m he reached the quarterfinals, where he was disqualified for a lane infringement; in the relay, the Italian team reached the final, but a faulty baton change with Luca Verdecchia cost them a likely medal, and they finished 6th in 39.42. From 2008 he underwent four surgeries on his Achilles tendon, which affected his career for several years afterward.

He returned to competition in 2014 after his surgeries, making his comeback at a meeting in Geneva on 14 June. He finished the season with a time of 10.74 in the 100 m. He chose not to compete over 200 metres that year, postponing his return to that event. From April 2014 he was registered with the Atletica Riccardi club.

== Achievements ==
Year	Competition	Venue	Position	Event	Notes
Representing Italy
2005	European U23 Championships	Erfurt, Germany	10th (h)	100m	10.62 (wind: -0.9 m/s)
2005	European U23 Championships	Erfurt, Germany	3rd	4 × 100 m relay	39.41 (Note: Under 23 category.)
2005	Universiade	İzmir, Turkey	5th	100m	10.57 (wind: +0.7 m/s)
2005	Universiade	İzmir, Turkey	1st	4 × 100 metres relay	39.25
2006	European Championships	Gothenburg, Sweden	28th (h)^{1}	200 metres	21.04
2006	European Championships	Gothenburg, Sweden	6th	4 × 100 metres relay	39.42

^{1}: Disqualified in the quarterfinal.

== Progression ==
=== 100 metres ===
Season	Performance	Venue	Date	World Ranking
2015	10.73	(Italy) Osimo	5 July 2015	-
2014	10.74	(Switzerland) Chiasso (Italy) Modena	24 August 2014; 10 September 2014	-
2013	N.T.			-
2012	N.T.			-
2011	10.84	(Italy) Mondovì	12 June 2011	-
2010	N.T.			-
2009	10.56	(Italy) Pergine Valsugana	25 July 2009	-
2008	10.52	(Switzerland) Bellinzona	21 June 2008	-
2007	10.41	(Nigeria) Abuja	5 May 2007	-
2006	10.37	(Switzerland) Bellinzona	26 August 2006	-
2005	10.40	(Italy) Pergine Valsugana	22 July 2005	-
2004	10.42	-	-	-
2003	10.49	(Italy) Donnas	23 June 2003	-
2002	10.91	-	-	-
2001	10.92	(Italy) Gorizia	5 June 2001	-
2000	11.62	-	-	-

=== 200 metres ===
Season	Performance	Venue	Date	World Ranking
2015	21.74	(Italy) Modena	21 June 2015	-
2012	N.T.			-
2011	N.T.			-
2010	N.T.			-
2009	N.T.			-
2008	21.14	(Switzerland) Geneva	31 May 2008	-
2007	20.3	(Nigeria) Abuja	5 May 2007	46th
2006	20.86	(Italy) Turin	6 June 2006	Italian Champion
2005	21.22	(Italy) Brixen	26 June 2005	-
2004	21.33	-	-	-
2003	21.32	(Italy) Grosseto	23 June 2003	-
2002	22.01	(Italy) Milan	30 June 2002	-
2001	21.63	(Italy) Fano	23 September 2001	-

== National titles ==
Stefano Anceschi has won one national championship.

- 1 win in 200 metres (2006)

== See also ==
- Italy national relay team
