= Sophie Poser =

German athletics competitor

Personal information
- Born: 2 March 1985 (age 41) Jena, East Germany
- Height: 1.66 m (5 ft 5 in)
- Weight: 55 kg (121 lb)
- Spouse: Florian Poser (2013-present)

Sport
- Country: Germany
- Sport: Track and field
- Event(s): 110 metre hurdles Long jump Heptathlon
- Club: Leichtathletik Club Jena
Medal record
Track and field
Representing Germany
World Junior Championships
Silver medal – second place	2014 Grosseto	Women's long jump
European Junior Championships
Gold medal – first place	2003 Tampere	Women's long jump
Gold medal – first place	2003 Tampere	Women's 110m hurdles

Sophie Poser née Krauel (born 2 March 1985) is a former German track and field athlete who competed in mainly long jump events.

She married her boyfriend Florian Poser in May 2013, he competes in decathlon and they had a baby together in December the same year.
