= Daniela Lincoln-Saavedra =

Swedish long jumper

Daniela Lincoln-Saavedra (born 4 August 1984) is a retired Swedish long jumper.

She won the bronze medal at the 2003 European Junior Championships and competed at the 2006 European Championships and the 2007 European Indoor Championships without reaching the final.

Her personal best jump was 6.56 metres, achieved in June 2006 at Bislett stadion.
