= Koura Kaba Fantoni =

Italian sprinter

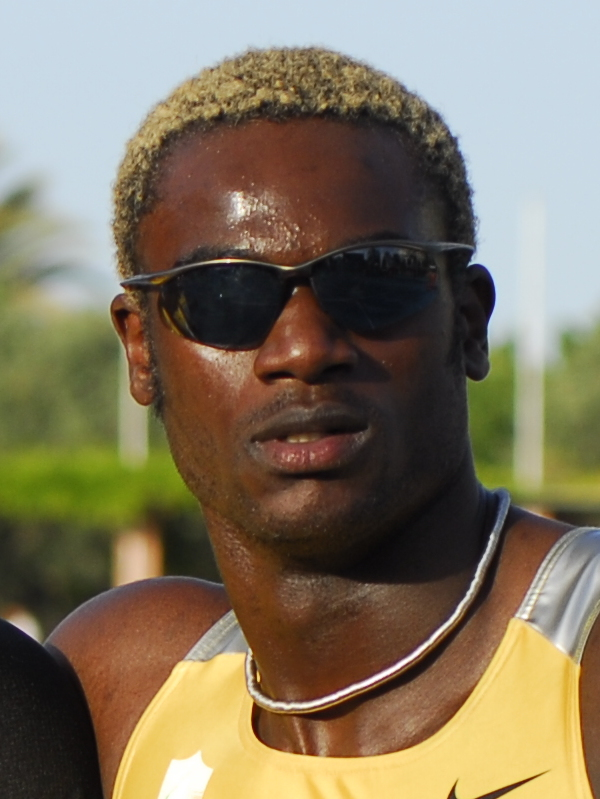
- Koura Kaba Fantoni in 2006

Personal information
- Nationality: Italian
- Born: 28 August 1984 (age 42) Kinshasa, Zaire
- Height: 1.93 m (6 ft 4 in)
- Weight: 78 kg (172 lb)

Sport
- Country: Italy
- Sport: Athletics
- Event: Sprint
- Club: G.S. Fiamme Gialle
- Coached by: Milvio Fantoni

Achievements and titles
- Personal bests: 100 m: 10.28 (2004); 200 m: 20.28 (2005)
Medal record
European U23 Championships
Bronze medal – third place	2005 Erfurt	200 metres
Bronze medal – third place	2005 Erfurt	4×100 metres relay

Koura Kaba Fantoni (born 28 August 1984) is an Italian former sprinter.

== Biography ==
Born in Zaire, he lived in Turin from the age of three.

== Achievements ==
Year	Competition	Venue	Position	Event	Notes
Representing Italy
2005	European U23 Championships	Erfurt, Germany	4th	100m	10.34 w (wind: +2.4 m/s)
2005	European U23 Championships	Erfurt, Germany	3rd	200m	20.71 (wind: +1.3 m/s)
2005	European U23 Championships	Erfurt, Germany	3rd	4 × 100 m relay	39.41
2005	World Championships	(Finland) Helsinki	40th (h)	200 metres	21.10 (wind: -0.4 m/s)
2006	European Championships	(Sweden) Gothenburg	36th (h)	200 metres	21.14

== National titles ==
Koura Kaba Fantoni has won the Italian Athletics Championships two times in sprint.

- 1 win in 100 metres (2007)
- 1 win in 200 metres (2005)

== See also ==
- Italy national relay team
