= Kostyantyn Vasyukov =

Ukrainian sprinter

Medal record

Men's athletics

Representing Ukraine

European Championships
Gold medal – first place	2002 Munich	4×100 m

Kostyantyn Vasyukov (born 10 January 1981) is a Ukrainian retired athlete specialising in the sprinting events. He won the bronze medal in the 60 metres at the 2005 European Indoor Championships.

== Competition record ==
Year	Competition	Venue	Position	Event	Notes
Representing Ukraine
1999	European Junior Championships	Riga, Latvia	3rd	100 m	10.41
2000	World Junior Championships	Santiago, Chile	12th (sf)	100 m	10.62 (wind: -0.3 m/s)
2000	World Junior Championships	Santiago, Chile	21st (qf)	200 m	21.50 (wind: -0.2 m/s)
2001	European U23 Championships	Amsterdam, Netherlands	20th (h)	100 m	22.39 (wind: 1.4 m/s)
2002	European Championships	Munich, Germany	1st	4 × 100 m relay	38.53
2003	World Championships	Paris, France	–	4 × 100 m relay	DQ
2005	European Indoor Championships	Madrid, Spain	3rd	60 m	6.62
2005	Universiade	İzmir, Turkey	15th (sf)	100 m	10.87
2006	World Indoor Championships	Moscow, Russia	7th (sf)	60 m	6.63
2006	European Championships	Gothenburg, Sweden	–	100 m	DQ
2006	European Championships	Gothenburg, Sweden	7th	4 × 100 m relay	39.54

== Personal bests ==
Outdoor

- 100 metres – 10.22 (+1.3 m/s) (Kyiv 2006)
- 200 metres – 21.32 (Kyiv 2000)

Indoor

- 50 metres – 5.84 (Groningen 2005)
- 60 metres – 6.61 (Zaporizhia 2004)
