= Rosario La Mastra =

Italian sprinter (born 1984)

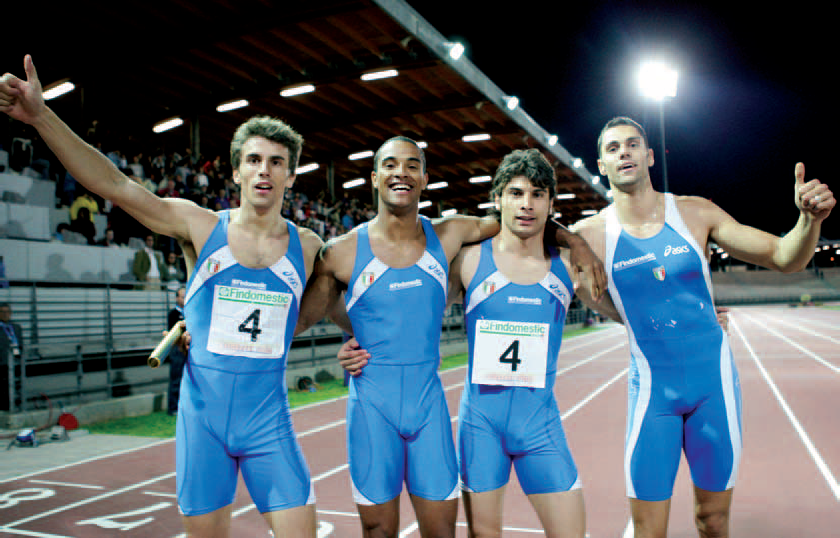
- Rosario La Mastra (2nd from right) in 2006

Personal information
- Nationality: Italian
- Born: 1 February 1984 (age 42) Catania, Italy
- Height: 1.79 m (5 ft 10 1/2 in)
- Weight: 76 kg (168 lb)

Sport
- Country: Italy
- Sport: Athletics
- Event: Sprint
- Club: C.S. Carabinieri
- Coached by: Filippo Di Mulo

Achievements and titles
- Personal bests: 100 m: 10.27 (2007); 200 m: 21.46 (2007)
Medal record
European U23 Championships
Bronze medal – third place	2005 Erfurt	4x100 m relay

Rosario La Mastra (1 February 1984) is an Italian sprinter.

== Biography ==
He qualified for the 2012 Summer Olympics, as replacement, in the national 4x100 metres relay team.

== Achievements ==
Year	Competition	Venue	Position	Event	Notes
Representing Italy
2005	European U23 Championships	Erfurt, Germany	3rd	4 × 100 m relay	39.41
2007	World Championships	Osaka, Japan	21st (Quarter-Finals)	100 metres	10.32
2007	World Championships	Osaka, Japan	10th (Heats)	4x100 metres relay	38.81 (junior)

== See also ==
- Italy at the 2012 Summer Olympics
