= Silvia La Barbera =

Italian long-distance runner

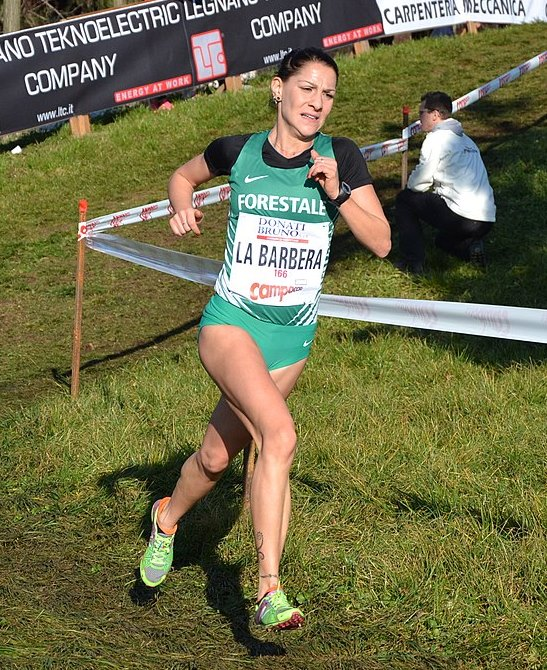

Personal information
- National team: Italy (7 caps)
- Born: 27 August 1984 (age 41) Altofonte, Italy
- Height: 1.64 m (5 ft 5 in)
- Weight: 48 kg (106 lb)

Sport
- Country: Italy
- Sport: Athletics
- Events: Long-distance running; Cross country running
- Club: G.S. Forestale; CUS Palermo
- Coached by: Antonio Cesarò

Achievements and titles
- Personal best: Half marathon: 1:16:14 (2014)
Medal record
European U23 Championships
| Bronze medal – third place | 2005 Erfurt | 5000 m |
European U20 Championships
| Gold medal – first place | 2003 Tampere | 5000 m |

Silvia La Barbera (born 27 August 1984) is an Italian female long-distance runner who competed at individual senior level at the IAAF World Half Marathon Championships and at the IAAF World Cross Country Championships (2005).

== Biografia ==
La Barbera won a bronze medal in 5000 metres at the 2005 European Athletics U23 Championships and gold medal at under-20 lve two years before at the 2003 European Athletics Junior Championships.

== National titles ==
She won a national championships at individual senior level.

- Italian Cross Country Championships
  - Long race: 2016
