= Sebastian Ernst =

German sprinter

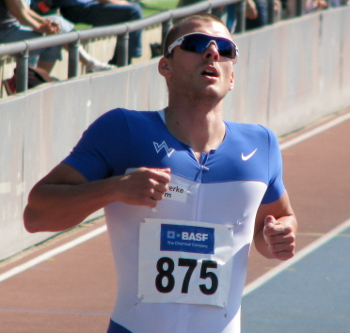
Sebastian Ernst

Sebastian Ernst (born 11 October 1984 in Gelsenkirchen) is a German sprinter who specializes in the 200 metres. His personal best time is 20.36 seconds, achieved during the heats at the 2004 Summer Olympics. This ranks him third among German 200m sprinters, only behind Tobias Unger and Frank Emmelmann. Ernst has represented the sports team TV Wattenscheid 01 and Schalke 04 domestically.

== Biography ==
As a junior, he finished sixth at the 2002 World Junior Championships. The following year he took the 200 m title at the 2003 European Athletics Junior Championships, as well as winning a silver medal in the relay. He made his senior international debut the following year at the 2004 IAAF World Indoor Championships, where he narrowly missed a spot in the 200 m finals. An Olympic debut came later that season for the nineteen-year-old and, after running a personal best of 20.36 seconds in the heats, he was eliminated in the semi-finals as the fastest non-qualifier.

His 2005 season was highlighted by a 200 m and 4 × 100 metres relay silver medal double at the 2005 European Athletics U23 Championships. He also made his first appearance at the World Championships in Athletics that year, but was eliminated in the quarter-finals. He began the following year by helping Germany to third in the Swedish medley relay at the 2006 European Athletics Indoor Cup. He claimed his first national title with a win at the German Athletics Championships and represented his country in the event at the 2006 European Athletics Championships, reaching the semi-finals. In the relay event, he finished fifth with teammates Alexander Kosenkow, Marius Broening and Ronny Ostwald.

He was the bronze medallist over 200 m at the 2010 European Team Championships but was runner-up to Daniel Schnelting at the 2010 German Athletics Championships the following month. He came close to a personal best in July, running 20.38 seconds in Mannheim, but faltered at the 2010 European Athletics Championships, coming last in his semi-final. He broke the German indoor record for the 200 m with a time of 20.42 seconds, which he achieved at the 2011 German Indoor Athletics Championships.

== Achievements ==
Year	Competition	Venue	Position	Event	Notes
Representing Germany
2002	World Junior Championships	Kingston, Jamaica	6th	200m	21.00 (wind: +0.9 m/s)
2002	World Junior Championships	Kingston, Jamaica	6th	4 × 100 m relay	40.00
2003	European Junior Championships	Tampere, Finland	1st	200 m	20.63 (wind: +1.0 m/s)
2004	World Indoor Championships	Budapest, Hungary	8th (semis)	200 m	21.02
2004	Olympic Games	Athens, Greece	9th (semis)	200 m	20.63 (wind: +0.2 m/s)
2005	European U23 Championships	Erfurt, Germany	2nd	200m	20.58 (wind: +1.3 m/s)
2005	European U23 Championships	Erfurt, Germany	2nd	4 × 100 m relay	39.12
2005	World Championships	Helsinki, Finland	26th (q-finals)	200 m	21.54 (wind: -3.4 m/s)
2006	European Championships	Gothenburg, Sweden	13th (semis)	200 m	21.04 (wind: +0.2 m/s)
2010	European Championships	Barcelona, Spain	16th (semis)	200 m	20.95 (wind: +1.2 m/s)

== See also ==
- German all-time top lists - 200 metres
