= Oksana Kaydash =

Ukrainian sprinter

Oksana Kaydash (Ukrainian: Оксана Кайдаш, born Oksana Guskova 16 June 1974) is a Ukrainian retired sprinter who specialized in the 100 metres.

In the 4 x 100 metres relay she finished fourth at the 2003 World Championships. The relay team was disqualified at the 1997 World Championships. She also competed at the 1999 World Championships without reaching the final.

Her personal best times are 7.23 seconds in the 60 metres (indoor), achieved in February 2000 in Lviv; and 11.25 seconds in the 100 metres, achieved in June 2004 in Erfurt.
