= 2003 European Athletics Junior Championships =

- Dates: 23 – 27 July
- Host city: Tampere, Finland
- Venue: Tampere Stadium
- Level: Under 20
- Events: 44
- Records set: 1 WR, 4 CRs

The 2003 European Athletics Junior Championships was held in Tampere, Finland from 23 to 27 July 2003. A total of 44 events were contested; 22 by men and 22 by women. Germany had the biggest medal haul with nine golds and a total of 26, closely followed by Russia (also 9 golds but 24 medals in total). Great Britain was third with 17 medals, while Romania was fourth with ten medals. Four championship records were set at the competition, although three were as a result of using lighter implements in the men's throwing events.

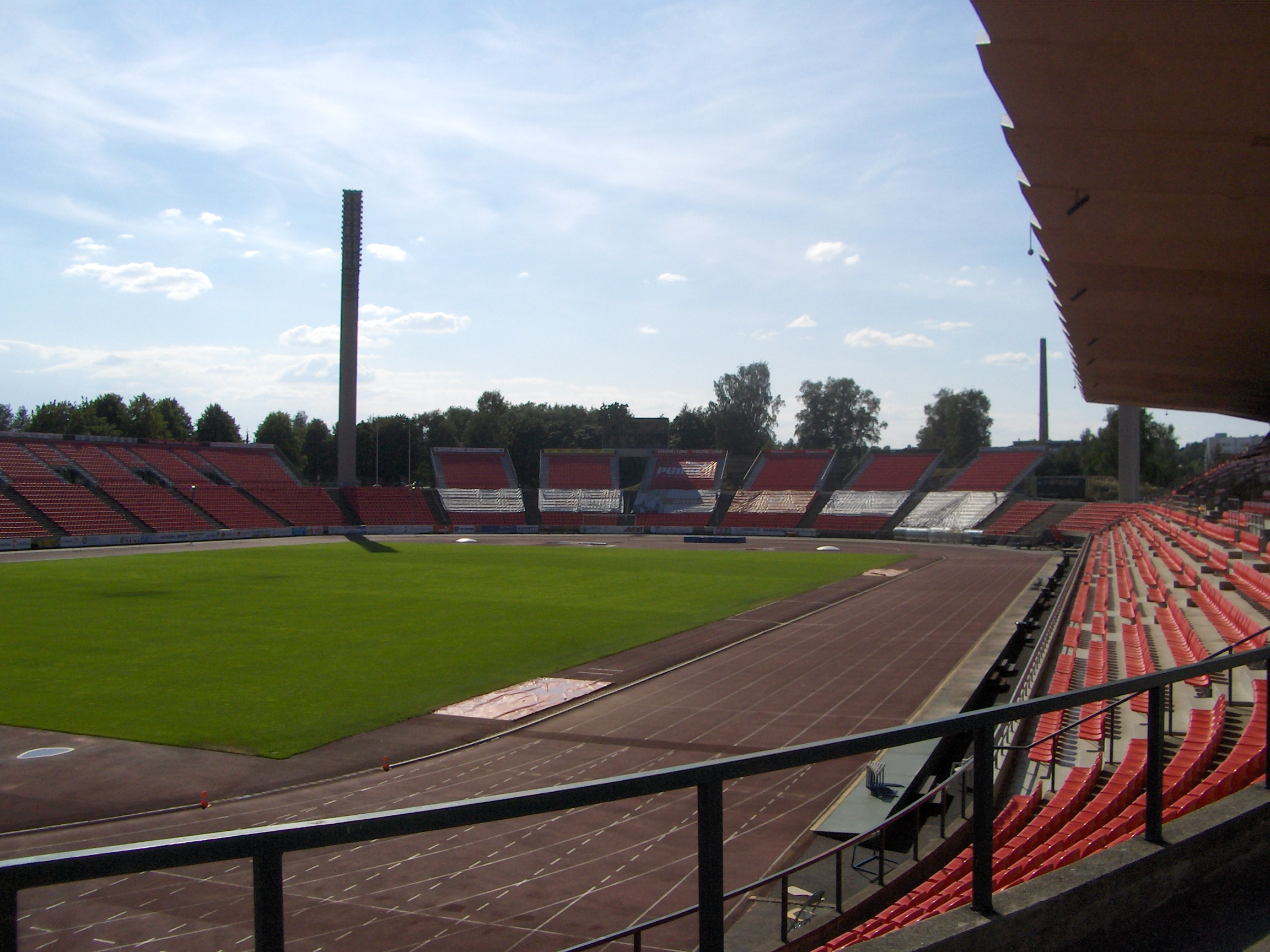
Host stadium in Tampere.

Nelson Évora was a stand-out performer, having won both the long jump and triple jump. Ivet Lalova of Bulgaria did the sprint double in the women's 100 metres and 200 metres, while Sophie Krauel showed her versatility by taking golds in the 100 metres hurdles and the long jump. The long-distance track events also provided opportunities for athletes to double up, as Inna Poluškina and Marius Ionescu both left the competition with a gold and a silver medal.

The men's javelin throw offered the chance for the hosts to demonstrate their ability in the country's favourite athletics event – the Finnish men swept the podium through the efforts of Teemu Wirkkala, Tero Järvenpää, and Antti Ruuskanen. In the women's 2000 m steeplechase, Catalina Oprea set a world record in the rarely competed event, despite falling over mid-race. This was the last time that the women's 2000 metres steeplechase was held, as it was replaced by a 3000 m version in 2005.

== Records ==
Name	Event	Country	Record	Type
Magnus Lohse	Shot put	Sweden	20.28 m†	CR
Erik Cadée	Discus throw	Netherlands	60.42 m†	CR
Lorenzo Povegliano	Hammer throw	Italy	72.72 m†	CR
Catalina Oprea	2000 metres steeplechase	Romania	6:21.78	WR, CR

Key:	WR — World record • AR — Area record • CR — Championship record • NR — National record

- † = New mark established with a lighter junior throwing implement (6 kg shot and hammer, 1.75 kg discus)

== Medal summary ==
=== Men ===
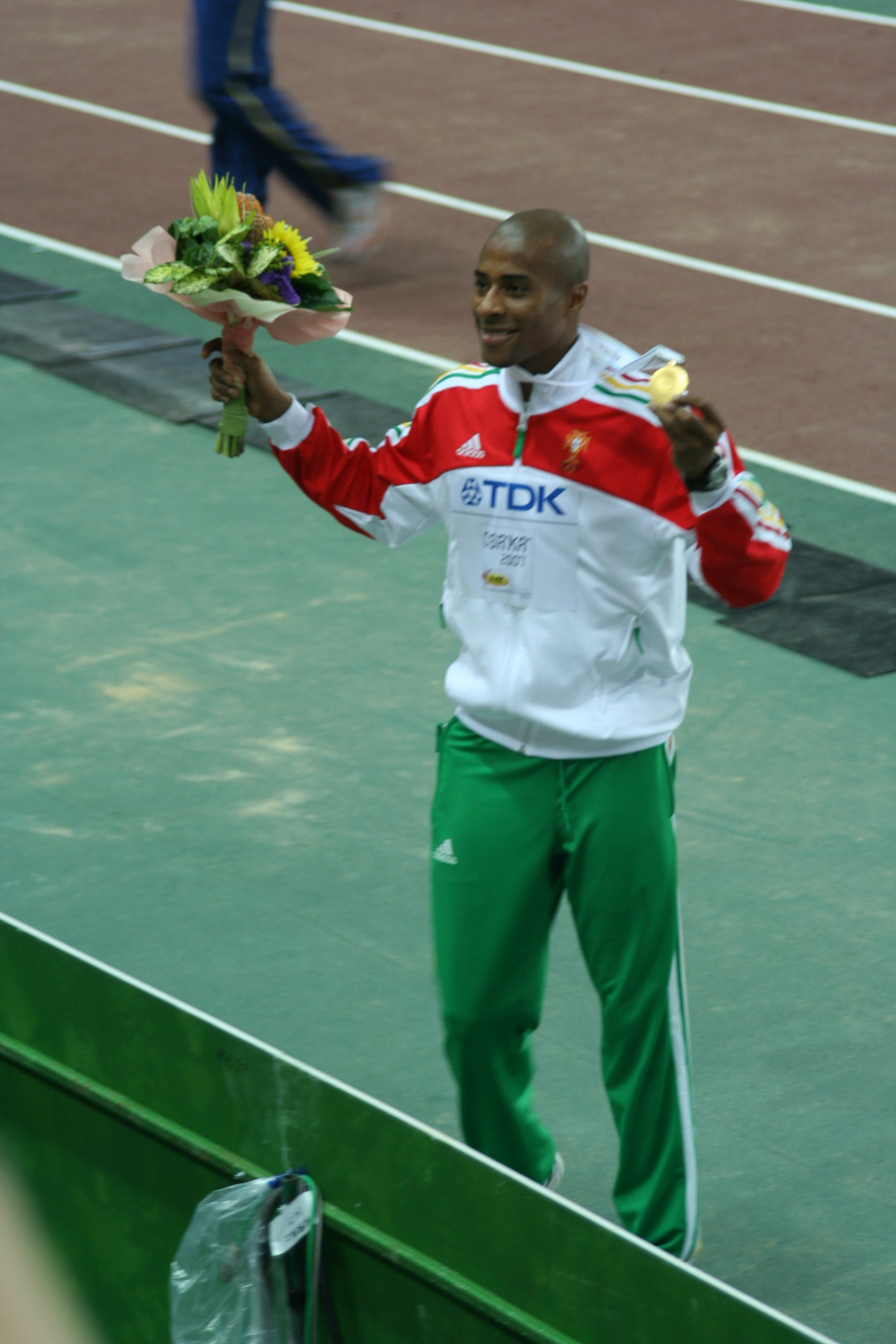
Nelson Évora completed a long jump/triple jump double

Event	Gold		Silver		Bronze	
100 m	Leon Baptiste; Great Britain	10.50	Till Helmke; Germany	10.52	Monu Miah; Great Britain	10.54
200 m	Sebastian Ernst; Germany	20.63	Roman Smirnov; Russia	20.86	Till Helmke; Germany	20.86
400 m	Dimítrios Gravalos; Greece	46.54	Kamghe Gaba; Germany	46.63	Piotr Kedzia; Poland	46.69
800 m	René Bauschinger; Germany	1:46.43	David Fiegen; Luxembourg	1:49.91	Ireneusz Sekretarski; Poland	1:49.97
1500 m	Bartosz Nowicki; Poland	3:45.01	Thomas Lancashire; Great Britain	3:45.60	Olle Walleräng; Sweden	3:46.17
5000 m	Anatoliy Rybakov; Russia	14:13.41	Marius Ionescu; Romania	14:16.12	Cristinel Irimia; Romania	14:17.30
10,000 m	Marius Ionescu; Romania	29:40.41	Alexey Reunkov; Russia	29:40.80	Mohammed Bashir; Denmark	29:42.42
3000 m steeplechase	Ruben Schwarz; Germany	8:46.21	Maricel Ionascu; Romania	8:53.31	Christoforos Meroussis; Greece	8:55.69
110 m hurdles	Bano Traore; France	13.95	Andreas Kundert; Switzerland	14.18	Kai Doskoczynski; Germany	14.26
400 m hurdles	Rhys Williams; Great Britain	51.15	Mohamed Atig; France	51.46	Rupert Gardner; Great Britain	51.83
4 × 100 metres relay	Great Britain; Andrew Matthews; Laurence Oboh; Monu Miah; Leon Baptiste	40.37	Germany; Martin Lohmann; Kai Doskoczynski; Sebastian Ernst; Till Helmke	40.41	France; Cédric Fagris; Jean-Paul Fernandez; Guillaume Wallard; Eddy De Lépine	40.50
4 × 400 metres relay	Germany; Lars Förster; Thomas Wilhelm; Christoph Gernand; Kamghe Gaba	3:08.31	Poland; Łukasz Pryga; Karol Grzegorczyk; Rafał Błocian; Piotr Kędzia	3:08.62	Russia; Konstantin Svechkar; Maksim Aleksandrenko; Ivan Kozhukhar; Dmitriy Shubin	3:08.81
10 km walk	Vladimir Parvatkin; Russia	41:33.55	Michal Blazek; Slovakia	41:54.66	Francisco Arcilla; Spain	42:06.15
High jump	Jaroslav Baba; Czech Republic	2.28 m	Aleksey Dmitrik; Russia	2.26 m	Linus Thörnblad; Sweden	2.23 m
Pole vault	Vincent Favretto; France	5.50 m	Artyom Kuptsov; Russia	5.50 m	Fabian Schulze; Germany	5.40 m
Long jump	Nelson Évora; Portugal	7.83 m	Christian Kaczmarek; Germany	7.81 m	Tim Riedel; Germany	7.65 m
Triple jump	Nelson Évora; Portugal	16.43 m	Dmitriy Detsuk; Belarus	16.13 m	Yevgen Semenenko; Ukraine	16.04 m
Shot put	Magnus Lohse; Sweden	20.28 m	Anton Lyuboslavskiy; Russia	20.10 m	Georgi Ivanov; Bulgaria	19.94 m
Discus throw	Erik Cadée; Netherlands	60.42 m	Martin Marić; Croatia	58.59 m	Andreas Porth; Germany	58.45 m
Hammer throw	Lorenzo Povegliano; Italy	72.72 m	Kamilius Bethke; Germany	72.60 m	Andrey Azarenkov; Russia	72.10 m
Javelin throw	Teemu Wirkkala; Finland	79.90 m	Tero Järvenpää; Finland	73.66 m	Antti Ruuskanen; Finland	72.87 m
Decathlon	Nicklas Wiberg; Sweden	7604 pts	Alexey Sysoev; Russia	7531 pts	Steffen Willwacher; Germany	7497 pts

=== Women ===
Event	Gold		Silver		Bronze	
100 metres	Ivet Lalova (BUL)	11.43	Véronique Mang (FRA)	11.56	Jade Lucas-Read (GBR)	11.60
200 metres	Ivet Lalova (BUL)	22.88	Jenny Ljunggren (SWE)	23.35	Virginie Michanol (FRA)	23.36
400 metres	Mariya Dryakhlova (RUS)	52.65	Joanne Cuddihy (IRL)	53.62	Christine Ohuruogu (GBR)	54.21
800 metres	Simona Barcau (ROM)	2:02.76	Charlotte Moore (GBR)	2:03.40	Jemma Simpson (GBR)	2:03.42
1500 metres	Nelya Neporadna (UKR)	4:12.57	Dani Barnes (GBR)	4:16.91	Corina Dumbravean (ROM)	4:17.56
3000 metres	Inna Poluškina (LAT)	9:07.85	Binnaz Uslu (TUR)	9:23.10	Adriënne Herzog (NED)	9:26.01
5000 metres	Silvia La Barbera (ITA)	15:52.20	Inna Poluškina (LAT)	15:55.69	Charlotte Dale (GBR)	16:07.26
100 metre hurdles	Sophie Krauel (GER)	13.28	Symone Belle (GBR)	13.53	Sabrina Altermatt (SUI)	13.59
400 metre hurdles	Yekaterina Kostetskaya (RUS)	57.52	Irina Obedina (RUS)	57.57	Zuzana Hejnová (CZE)	58.30
2000 metres steeplechase	Catalina Oprea (ROM)	6:21.78 WJR	Ancuţa Bobocel (ROM)	6:32.03	Yekaterina Bespalova (RUS)	6:35.11
4 × 100 metre relay	France (FRA); Natacha Vouaux; Lina Jacques-Sébastien; Aurélie Kamga; Véronique Mang	44.60	Great Britain (GBR); Anyika Onuora; Kadi-Ann Thomas; Amy Spencer; Jade Lucas-Read	44.81	Finland (FIN); Siina Pylkkä; Elina Korjansalo; Sari Keskitalo; Elisa Hakamäki	45.00
4 × 400 metre relay	Russia (RUS); Tatyana Popova; Yekaterina Kostetskaya; Yelena Migunova; Mariya Dryakhlova	3:33.48	France (FRA); Dora Jemaa; Thélia Sigère; Rose Ndje; Virginie Michanal	3:37.78	Great Britain (GBR); Christine Ohuruogu; Sian Scott; Victoria Griffiths; Gemma Nicol	3:38.96
10 km walk	Irina Petrova (RUS)	47:12.77	Anna Bragina (RUS)	47:17.56	Ana Cabecinha (POR)	47:36.15
High jump	Ariane Friedrich (GER)	1.88 m	Aileen Herrmann (GER)	1.86 m	Emma Green (SWE)	1.86 m
Pole vault	Silke Spiegelburg (GER)	4.15 m	Floé Kühnert (GER)	4.15 m	Aleksandra Kiryashova (RUS)	4.15 m
Long jump	Sophie Krauel (GER)	6.47 m	Adina Anton (ROM)	6.46 m	Daniela Lincoln-Saavedra (SWE)	6.35 m
Triple jump	Anastasiya Taranova (RUS)	13.61 m	Cristine Spataru (ROM)	13.54 m	Svetlana Bolshakova (RUS)	13.37 m
Shot put	Anna Avdeyeva (RUS)	16.71 m	Yulia Leantsiuk (BLR)	16.29 m	Petra Lammert (GER)	16.16 m
Discus throw	Ulrike Giesa (GER)	53.75 m	Nadine Müller (GER)	53.44 m	Darya Pishchalnikova (RUS)	52.39 m
Hammer throw	Katarzyna Kita (POL)	66.08 m	Maryia Smaliachkova (BLR)	65.89 m	Berta Castells (ESP)	65.64 m
Javelin throw	Julia Zandt (GER)	56.96 m	Mareike Rittweg (GER)	54.74 m	Ilze Gribule (LAT)	52.76 m
Heptathlon	Olga Levenkova (RUS)	5748 pts	Kathrin Geissler (GER)	5631 pts	Anna Kryazheva (RUS)	5605 pts

== Medal table ==
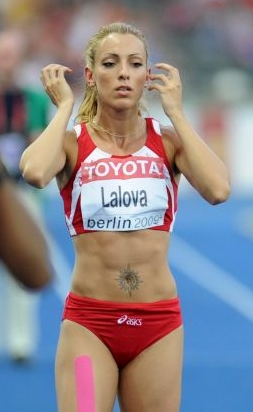
Sprinter Ivet Lalova won both of Bulgaria's gold medals

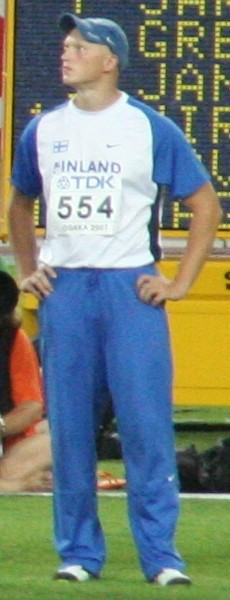
Teemu Wirkkala took the host's sole gold in the javelin

* Host nation (Finland)

Rank	Nation	Gold	Silver	Bronze	Total
1	Germany	9	10	7	26
2	Russia	9	8	7	24
3	Great Britain	4	5	8	17
4	Romania	3	5	2	10
5	France	3	3	2	8
6	Sweden	2	1	4	7
7	Poland	2	1	2	5
8	Bulgaria	2	0	1	3
8	Portugal	2	0	1	3
10	Italy	2	0	0	2
11	Finland*	1	1	2	4
12	Latvia	1	1	1	3
13	Czech Republic	1	0	1	2
13	Netherlands	1	0	1	2
13	Ukraine	1	0	1	2
16	Greece	1	0	0	1
17	Belarus	0	3	0	3
18	Switzerland	0	1	1	2
19	Croatia	0	1	0	1
19	Ireland	0	1	0	1
19	Luxembourg	0	1	0	1
19	Slovakia	0	1	0	1
19	Turkey	0	1	0	1
24	Spain	0	0	2	2
25	Denmark	0	0	1	1
Totals (25 entries)		44	44	44	132

== See also ==
- 2003 in athletics (track and field)
