= Ronald Pognon =

French sprinter

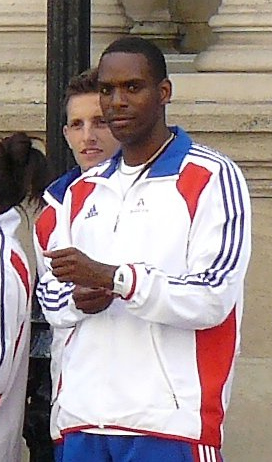
- Pognon in 2010

Personal information
- Nationality: France
- Born: 16 November 1982 (age 43) Le Lamentin, Martinique
- Height: 1.86 m (6 ft 1 in)
- Weight: 83 kg (183 lb)

Sport
- Sport: Running
- Events: 100 metres, 200 metres

Achievements and titles
- Personal bests: 100 m: 9.98 s (Lausanne 2005); 200 m: 20.27 s (Rieti 2005)
Medal record
Men's athletics
Representing France
Olympic Games
Bronze medal – third place	2012 London	4 × 100 m relay
World Championships
Gold medal – first place	2005 Helsinki	4 × 100 m relay
European Championships
Bronze medal – third place	2006 Gothenburg	4 × 100 m relay
Bronze medal – third place	2012 Helsinki	4 × 100 m relay
European Indoor Championships
Silver medal – second place	2005 Madrid	60 m
Bronze medal – third place	2007 Birmingham	60 m
Representing Martinique
CARIFTA Games Junior (U20)
Gold medal – first place	2001 Bridgetown	200 m

Ronald Pognon (born 16 November 1982) is a French sprint athlete. He originally specialized in the 200 metres, but later shifted to the shorter sprint distances. He was formerly the European record holder for the 60 metres indoors and is the first Frenchman to go under 10 seconds at the 100 metres.

== Early career ==
As a junior athlete he participated at the 2000 World Junior Championships, winning a silver medal in the 4 × 100 metres relay. He also competed individually in the 200 metres, without reaching the final. His personal best 200 m result at that time was 21.25 seconds, whereas his personal best 100 m result was 10.50 seconds. Two years later he had improved to 20.65 and 10.24 seconds respectively, and reached the 200 m semifinals at the 2002 European Championships. At the 2002 European Championships he also finished fourth in 4 × 100 m relay with teammates David Patros, Issa-Aimé Nthépé and Jérôme Éyana.

He then shifted focus to the 100 metres. He reached the semifinals in this event at both the 2003 World Championships and the 2004 Olympic Games. At the Olympics he also competed in the relay, but failed to reach the final with the French team. He lowered his personal best time to 10.13 seconds in 2003 and 10.11 in 2004, both times in the town Castres.

== Breakthrough ==
In 2005 he started the season by setting a French indoor record in the 60 metres, with 6.45 seconds on 2 March in Karlsruhe. He won the silver medal in the same event at the 2005 European Indoor Championships.

He competed at the 2005 World Championships in both 100 and 200 metres, but did not reach the final; however, in the 4 × 100 m relay he won a gold medal together with teammates Ladji Doucouré, Eddy De Lépine and Lueyi Dovy. He rounded off the season by finishing fifth in the 2005 World Athletics Final. He also set personal best times in both 100 and 200 metres that season. 9.99 seconds in the Lausanne Super Grand Prix in July, and 20.27 seconds in the Rieti Grand Prix in August. He became the first Frenchman to go under 10 seconds, and only four Europeans had run faster: Francis Obikwelu (9.86), Linford Christie (9.87), Dwain Chambers (9.97) and Jason Gardener (9.98).

In 2006 he finished sixth at the 2006 World Indoor Championships, fourth at the 2006 European Championships and sixth at the 2006 World Athletics Final, the latter in a season's best time of 10.10 seconds. At the European Championships he helped win a bronze medal in the relay, behind Great Britain and Poland, together with an entirely new team: Oudéré Kankarafou, Pognon, Fabrice Calligny and David Alerte. At the end of the season, Pognon was selected for the 2006 World Cup, finishing fifth in the 100 metres.

== Later career ==
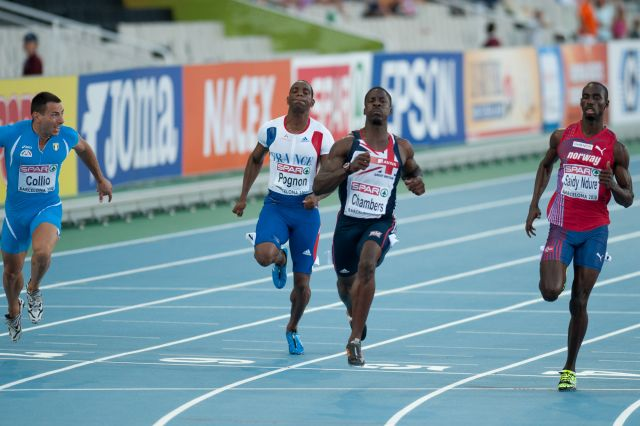
Ronald Pognon (2nd from the left) during the 2010 European Championships.

The 2007 season saw Pognon win a bronze medal in 60 metres at the 2007 European Indoor Championships. He had run the 60 metres in 6.55 seconds, better than the year before. However, during the outdoor season he did not compete. He returned to competition in 2008, running only 6.68 in the 60 m indoors but managing 10.13 seconds in July in Rethimno to qualify for the Olympic Games in Beijing. Competing in the 100 metres event, he placed third in his heat behind Tyrone Edgar and Darvis Patton in a time of 10.26 seconds. He qualified for the second round in which he improved his time to 10.21 seconds; however, he was unable to qualify for the semifinals as he finished in fourth place. He did not participate in the 4 × 100 m relay, although France did field a team.

At the 2012 Summer Olympics, he was part of the French 4 × 100 m relay team that went on to finish 3rd in the final, winning the bronze medal.

== Statistics ==
As of 2 April 2014

=== Personal bests ===
Date	Event	Venue	Time (seconds)
19 February 2005	50 metres	Liévin, France	5.67
13 February 2005	60 metres	Karlsruhe, Germany	6.45
5 July 2005	100 metres	Lausanne, Switzerland	9.99
28 August 2005	200 metres	Rieti, Italy	20.27

- All information from IAAF Profile
