= Rikki Fifton =

British sprinter

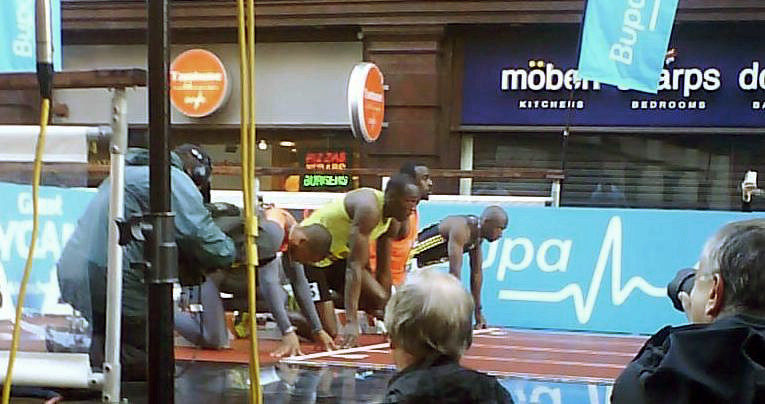
- Fifton (front) in the starting blocks for the 150 meters street race. Usain Bolt (in yellow) set a world best of 14.35 seconds.

Personal information
- Nationality: British (English)
- Born: 17 June 1985 (age 41) Lewisham, London, England
- Height: 180 cm (5 ft 11 in)
- Weight: 70 kg (150 lb)

Sport
- Sport: Athletics
- Event: Sprints
- College team: Loughborough University
- Club: Newham and Essex Beagles; VPHTH AC

Achievements and titles
- Personal bests: 100m: 10.16; 200m: 20.46
Medal record
Men's athletics
Representing Great Britain
European U23 Championships
Bronze medal – third place	2007 Debrecen	200 m

Rikki Darren Fifton (born 17 June 1985) is a British sprinter who mainly specialises in the 200 metres, but occasionally competes in 100 metres, 400 metres, and relay events. He was selected for the 2008 Summer Olympics.

== Biography ==
Before becoming involved in athletics, Fifton was an avid kick boxer. He currently runs for the Newham and Essex Beagles and is studying for a PE and Sociology degree at Loughborough University.

He made his first international junior appearance at the 2003 European Athletics Junior Championships, finishing fourth in the 200 m final. The following year he attended the 2004 World Junior Championships in Athletics and again reached the final, this time finishing in sixth place. His most accomplished performance to date on the senior athletics circuit is getting to the semi-finals of the European Championships in Athletics in 2006 and winning the 200 m at the national indoor championships in 2007. He won the 200 m bronze medal at the 2007 European Athletics U23 Championships, finishing behind Visa Hongisto and Vojtech Sulc.

In May 2009, Fifton took part in the 150 meters street race at the Great City Games in Manchester. He reached the final of the event and finished fourth with a time of 15.13 seconds, behind Ivory Williams, Marlon Devonish and Usain Bolt.

He won the 200 m at the European Athletics permit meet in Geneva in June with a new personal best of 20.46 seconds. This made him top of the European rankings in the event and improved his chances for a place in the 2009 European Team Championships. He was selected to run the 4×100 m relay and the 200 m at the competition. However, he suffered a hamstring injury in the relay race and Great Britain finished tenth. Teammate Dwain Chambers won as the stand-in 200 m runner.

== Personal bests ==
Event	Best	Location	Date
60 metres	6.61 s	Birmingham, England	16 February 2008
100 metres	10.16 s	Shanghai, China	28 September 2007
150 metres	15.13 s	Manchester, England	17 May 2009
200 metres (outdoor)	20.46 s	Geneva, Switzerland	6 June 2009
200 metres (indoor)	21.06 s	Sheffield, England	10 February 2007

- All information taken from IAAF profile.
