= 2005 European Athletics U23 Championships =

5th European Athletics U23 Championships
- Dates: 14–17 July 2005
- Host city: Erfurt, Germany
- Venue: Steigerwaldstadion
- Level: U23
- Type: Outdoor
- Events: 44
- Participation: 748 athletes from 41 nations

The 5th European Athletics U23 Championships were held in Erfurt, Germany, at Steigerwaldstadion between 14 and 17 July 2005.

Complete results and medal winners were published.

== Men's Results ==
Event	Gold		Silver		Bronze	
100 metres	Oudéré Kankarafou; France	10.26	Eddy De Lépine; France	10.30	Stefan Wieser; Germany	10.32
200 metres	David Alerte; France	20.47	Sebastian Ernst; Germany	20.58	Koura Kaba Fantoni; Italy	20.71
400 metres	Robert Tobin; Great Britain	46.81	Kamghe Gaba; Germany	47.07	Daniel Dąbrowski; Poland	47.44
800 metres	Kévin Hautcœur; France	1:51.29	Manuel Olmedo; Spain	1:51.47	René Bauschinger; Germany	1:51.49
1500 metres	Arturo Casado; Spain	3:47.02	Stefan Eberhardt; Germany	3:48.09	Francisco España; Spain	3:48.16
5000 metres	Anatoliy Rybakov; Russia	14:06.69	Mo Farah; Great Britain	14:10.96	Aleksey Aleksandrov; Russia	14:11.10
10,000 metres	Yevgeniy Rybakov; Russia	29:30.76	André Pollmächer; Germany	29:33.22	Marius Ionescu; Romania	29:34.52
110 metres hurdles	David Hughes; Great Britain	13.56	Willi Mathiszik; Germany	13.58	Stanislav Sajdok; Czech Republic	13.66
400 metres hurdles	Rhys Williams; Great Britain	49.60	Minas Alozidis; Greece	50.04	Ákos Dezso; Hungary	50.31
3000 metres steeplechase	Radosław Popławski; Poland	8:32.61	Halil Akkaş; Turkey	8:37.38	Pieter Desmet; Belgium	8:41.07
4 × 100 metres relay	France; Oudéré Kankarafou; Idrissa M'Barke; Eddy De Lépine; David Alerte	38.95	Germany; Florian Rentz; Marius Broening; Sebastian Ernst; Till Helmke	39.12	Italy; Rosario La Mastra; Alessandro Rocco; Stefano Anceschi; Koura Kaba Fantoni	39.41
4 × 400 metres relay	Poland; Witold Bańka; Piotr Zrada; Daniel Dąbrowski; Piotr Kędzia	3:04.41	Great Britain; Andrew Steele; Rhys Williams; Richard Davenport; Robert Tobin	3:04.83	Netherlands; Daniël Ward; Daniel de Wild; Sjors Kampen; Robert Lathouwers	3:04.99
20 kilometres walk	Igor Yerokhin; Russia	1:23:14	Benjamin Sánchez; Spain	1:23:30	Mikalai Seradovich; Belarus	1:23:56
High jump	Jaroslav Bába; Czech Republic	2.29	Artsiom Zaitsau; Belarus	2.27	Yuriy Krymarenko; Ukraine	2.27
Pole vault	Damiel Dossévi; France	5.75	Fabian Schulze; Germany	5.65	Jérôme Clavier; France; Matti Mononen; Finland	5.60
Long jump	Danut Simion; Romania	8.12	Dmitriy Sapinskiy; Russia	8.01	Povilas Mykolaitis; Lithuania	8.00
Triple jump	Aleksandr Sergeyev; Russia	17.11	Aleksandr Petrenko; Russia	17.03	Nelson Évora; Portugal	16.89
Shot put	Anton Lyuboslavskiy; Russia	20.44	Taavi Peetre; Estonia	19.85	Mika Vasara; Finland	19.84
Discus throw	Robert Harting; Germany	64.50	Piotr Małachowski; Poland	63.99	Dzmitry Sivakou; Belarus	60.62
Hammer throw	Pavel Kryvitski; Belarus	73.72	Aliaksandr Kazulka; Belarus	73.60	Andrey Azarenkov; Russia	71.18
Javelin throw	Igor Janik; Poland	77.25	Antti Ruuskanen; Finland	76.82	Magnus Arvidsson; Sweden	76.15
Decathlon	Aleksey Drozdov; Russia	8196	Aleksey Sysoyev; Russia	8089	Norman Müller; Germany	7989

=== Women's ===
Event	Gold		Silver		Bronze	
100 metres	Maria Karastamati; Greece	11.03	Lina Jacques-Sébastien; France	11.46	Verena Sailer; Germany	11.53
200 metres	Yelena Yakovleva; Russia	22.99	Nikolett Listar; Hungary	23.19	Vincenza Calì; Italy	23.31
400 metres	Olga Zaytseva; Russia	50.72	Christine Ohuruogu; Great Britain	50.73	Yelena Migunova; Russia	51.59
800 metres	Yevgeniya Zolotova; Russia	2:06.00	Jemma Simpson; Great Britain	2:06.16	Élodie Guégan; France	2:06.29
1500 metres	Corina Dumbrăvean; Romania	4:14.78	Olesya Syreva; Russia	4:16.23	Antje Möldner; Germany	4:16.34
5000 metres	Binnaz Uslu; Turkey	15:57.21	Tatyana Petrova; Russia	16:01.79	Silvia La Barbera; Italy	16:07.01
10,000 metres	Tatyana Petrova; Russia	33:55.99	Volha Minina; Belarus	34:03.55	Eva Maria Stower; Germany	34:05.03
100 metres hurdles	Mirjam Liimask; Estonia	12.93	Tina Klein; Germany	12.97	Anna Yevdokimova; Russia	13.12
400 metres hurdles	Yelena Ildeykina; Russia	56.43	Anastasiya Trifonova; Russia	56.51	Sian Scott; Great Britain	57.02
3000 metres steeplechase	Katarzyna Kowalska; Poland	9:54.17	Türkan Erismis; Turkey	9:55.45	Svetlana Ivanova; Russia	9:56.44
4 × 100 metres relay	France; Natacha Vouaux; Lina Jacques-Sébastien; Aurélie Kamga; Ayodele Ikuesan	44.22	Germany; Karoline Köhler; Verena Sailer; Johanna Kedzierski; Anne Möllinger	44.89	Italy; Claudia Baggio; Doris Tomasini; Alessia Berti; Vincenza Calì	45.03
4 × 400 metres relay	Russia; Anastasiya Ovchinnikova; Anastasiya Kochetova; Yelena Migunova; Olga Zaytseva	3:27.27	Great Britain; Kim Wall; Sian Scott; Lisa Miller; Christine Ohuruogu	3:31.64	France; Dora Jemaa; Thélia Sigère; Johanna Monthe; Phara Anacharsis	3:31.91
20 kilometres walk	Irina Petrova; Russia	1:33:24	Olga Kaniskina; Russia	1:33:33	Barbora Dibelková; Czech Republic	1:34:44
High jump	Tatjana Kivimägi; Russia	1.94	Emma Green; Sweden	1.92	Ariane Friedrich; Germany	1.90
Pole vault	Nataliya Kushch; Ukraine	4.30	Floé Kühnert; Germany	4.30	Julia Hütter; Germany	4.25
Long jump	Carolina Klüft; Sweden	6.79	Yuliya Zinovyeva; Russia	6.58	Adina Anton; Romania	6.55
Triple jump	Simona La Mantia; Italy	14.43	Svetlana Bolshakova; Russia	14.11	Athanasia Perra; Greece	13.94
Shot put	Petra Lammert; Germany	18.97	Christina Schwanitz; Germany	18.64	Chiara Rosa; Italy	18.22
Discus throw	Sabine Rumpf; Germany	60.75	Darya Pishchalnikova; Russia	59.45	Kateryna Karsak; Ukraine	56.81
Hammer throw	Yekaterina Khoroshikh; Russia	71.51	Betty Heidler; Germany	69.64	Nataliya Zolotukhina; Ukraine	67.75
Javelin throw	Annika Suthe; Germany	57.72	Katharina Molitor; Germany	57.01	Linda Brivule; Latvia	56.12
Heptathlon	Laurien Hoos; Netherlands	6291	Lilli Schwarzkopf; Germany	6196	Olga Levenkova; Russia	5950

== Medal table ==
* Host nation (Germany)

Rank	Nation	Gold	Silver	Bronze	Total
1	Russia (RUS)	15	10	6	31
2	France (FRA)	6	2	3	11
3	Germany (GER)*	4	14	8	26
4	Poland (POL)	4	1	1	6
5	Great Britain (GBR)	3	5	1	9
6	Romania (ROU)	2	0	2	4
7	Belarus (BLR)	1	3	2	6
8	Spain (ESP)	1	2	1	4
9	Turkey (TUR)	1	2	0	3
10	Greece (GRE)	1	1	1	3
10	Sweden (SWE)	1	1	1	3
12	Estonia (EST)	1	1	0	2
13	Italy (ITA)	1	0	6	7
14	Ukraine (UKR)	1	0	3	4
15	Czech Republic (CZE)	1	0	2	3
16	Netherlands (NED)	1	0	1	2
17	Finland (FIN)	0	1	2	3
18	Hungary (HUN)	0	1	1	2
19	Belgium (BEL)	0	0	1	1
19	Latvia (LAT)	0	0	1	1
19	Lithuania (LTU)	0	0	1	1
19	Portugal (POR)	0	0	1	1
Totals (22 entries)		44	44	45	133

== Participation ==
According to an unofficial count, 748 athletes from 41 countries participated in the event.

- Andorra (1)
- Armenia (1)
- Austria (5)
- Azerbaijan (2)
- Belarus (31)
- Belgium (18)
- Bosnia and Herzegovina (2)
- Bulgaria (7)
- Croatia (3)
- Cyprus (4)
- Czech Republic (15)
- Denmark (2)
- Estonia (14)
- Finland (16)
- France (70)
- Germany (77)
- Great Britain (48)
- Greece (22)
- Hungary (18)
- Iceland (1)
- Ireland (11)
- Israel (2)
- Italy (45)
- Latvia (11)
- Lithuania (14)
- Malta (2)
- Moldova (2)
- Netherlands (19)
- Norway (3)
- Poland (76)
- Portugal (4)
- Romania (16)
- Russia (56)
- Serbia and Montenegro (6)
- Slovakia (8)
- Slovenia (5)
- Spain (39)
- Sweden (20)
- Switzerland (13)
- Turkey (10)
- Ukraine (29)

== Notes and references ==
- Results at site European Athletics (Men)(Women)
- Official site
