= Onyeabor Ngwogu =

Nigerian sprinter

Personal information
- Born: 3 October 1983 (age 43) Abia State, Nigeria

Sport
- Country: Nigeria
- Sport: Athletics
- Events: 100 metres, 200 metres, 4 × 100 metres relay

Achievements and titles
- Personal bests: 100 metres: 10.21s 200 metres: 21.66s

Onyeabor Ngwogu (born 3 October 1983) is a track and field sprint athlete who competes internationally for Nigeria.

Ngwogu represented Nigeria at the 2008 Summer Olympics in Beijing. He competed at the 4 × 100 metres relay together with Obinna Metu, Chinedu Oriala and Uchenna Emedolu. In their qualification heat they did not finish due to a mistake in the baton exchange and they were eliminated.
