= Dmytro Hlushchenko =

Ukrainian sprinter

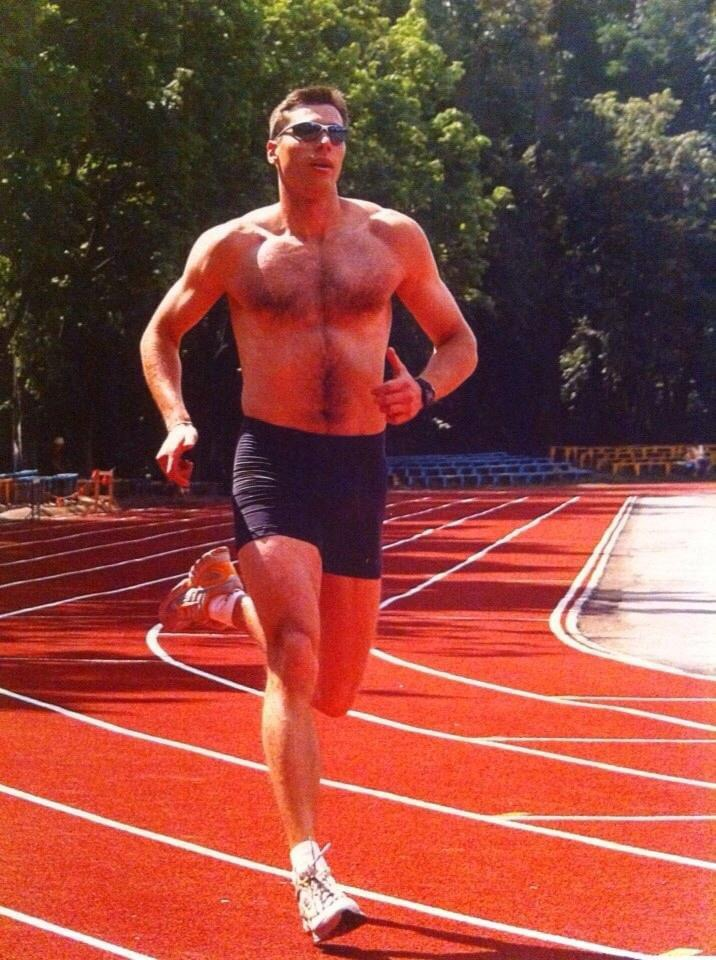
Hlushchenko in 2012

Dmytro Leonidovych Hlushchenko (also Glushchenko; Ukrainian: Дмитро Леонідович Глущенко; born 17 February 1981) is a Ukrainian and Israeli sprinter (changed family name in Israel to Dmitri Barskiy) who specializes in the 100 and 200 metres. His personal best time in the 200 metres is 20.75 seconds, achieved in May 2004 in Kyiv. In the 100 metres he has 10.25 seconds, achieved in July 2004 in Kyiv.

He finished fifth at the 2005 European Indoor Championships. He also competed at the 2005 World Championships, the 2006 European Championships, the 2008 World Indoor Championships and the 2008 Olympic Games without reaching the final.
