= Till Helmke =

German sprinter (born 1984)

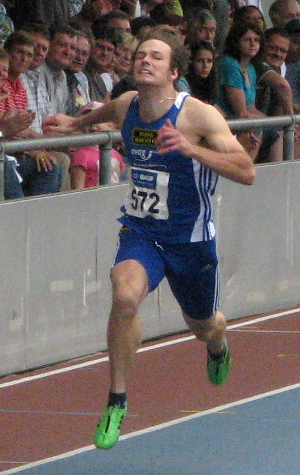
Till Helmke at Mannheim DLV Competition 2011

Till Helmke (born May 6, 1984 in Friedberg, Hesse) is a male track and field sprint athlete who competes internationally for Germany.

== Biography ==
Helmke represented Germany at the 2008 Summer Olympics in Beijing. He competed at the 4 × 100 metres relay with Tobias Unger, Alexander Kosenkow and Martin Keller. In their qualification heat they placed third behind Jamaica and Canada, but in front of China. Their time of 38.93 was the sixth fastest out of sixteen participating nations in the first round and they qualified for the final. There they sprinted to a time of 38.58 seconds, which was the fifth time.

== Achievements ==
Year	Competition	Venue	Position	Event	Notes
Representing Germany
2002	World Junior Championships	Kingston, Jamaica	7th	200 m	21.10 (wind: +0.9 m/s)
2002	World Junior Championships	Kingston, Jamaica	6th (h)	4 × 100 m relay	39.85
2003	European Junior Championships	Tampere, Finland	2nd	100 m	10.52
2003	European Junior Championships	Tampere, Finland	3rd	200 m	20.86
2003	European Junior Championships	Tampere, Finland	2nd	4 × 100 m relay	40.41
2005	European U23 Championships	Erfurt, Germany	5th	200 m	20.78 (wind: 1.3 m/s)
2005	European U23 Championships	Erfurt, Germany	2nd	4 × 100 m relay	39.12

== See also ==
- German all-time top lists - 200 metres
