= Argo Golberg =

Estonian sprinter

Argo Golberg (born 16 December 1982) is an Estonian sprinter.

He was born in Põlva. In 2001 he graduated from Audentes Sport Gymnasium.

He started his athletics career exercising in Põlva under the guidance of Sulev Arundi. Later his coach was Valter Espe. In 2003 he won a silver medal at the 2003 European Athletics U23 Championships. He is 7-times Estonian champion (between 2001 and 2006).

Records:

- 100 m: 10,28 (also Estonian national record)
- 60 m: 6,71
- 200 m 21,44 (2002)
