= Andrey Yepishin =

Russian sprinter

Medal record

Men's Athletics

Representing Russia

European Championships
| Silver medal – second place | 2006 Gothenburg | 100 m |

Summer Universiade
| Silver medal – second place | 2005 İzmir | 100 m |

World Indoor Championships
| Silver medal – second place | 2006 Moscow | 60 m |

Andrey Sergeyevich Yepishin (Russian: Андрей Серге́евич Епишин, born 10 June 1981 in Zhukovsky) is a Russian athlete specializing in the 100 metres.

== Career ==
He won a silver medal in 4 x 100 metres relay at the 2003 Summer Universiade. Participating in the 2004 Summer Olympics, he achieved fifth place in his 100 metres heat, thus failing to make it through to the second round. He also participated on the Russian relay team, which finished last. The next year Yepishin finished fifth at the European Indoor Championships, and won a silver medal at the Universiade in İzmir.

In 2006 he finished second in the 60 metres at the World Indoor Championships in Moscow to clock a new personal best and national record time of 6.52 seconds. He won the silver medal in the 100 m at the 2006 European Athletics Championships and recorded a new national record of 10.10 seconds.

He finished seventh at the 2006 IAAF World Cup, and eighth at the 2008 World Indoor Championships. At the 2008 Olympic Games he placed 2nd in his heat after Derrick Atkins in a time of 10.34 seconds. He qualified for the second round in which he improved his time to 10.25 seconds. However, he was unable to qualify for the semi-finals as he finished in 6th place of his heat.

== Personal bests ==
100m : 10.10(Gothenburg 2006)
