= Ronny Ostwald =

German sprinter

Medal record

Men's athletics

Representing Germany

European Championships
Bronze medal – third place	2002 Munich	4×100 m

Ronny Ostwald (born 7 April 1974, in Beeskow) is a German sprint athlete.

He finished 8th in the 100 m final at the 2006 European Athletics Championships in Gothenburg.

He has had more success as a relay runner for Germany, winning a bronze medal in the 4 × 100 m relay at the 2002 European Athletics Championships (belatedly when the United Kingdom team were disqualified after Dwain Chambers failed a drugs test in 2004) and competing in the relay team at the 2004 Summer Olympics.
