= Kristof Beyens =

Belgian sprinter

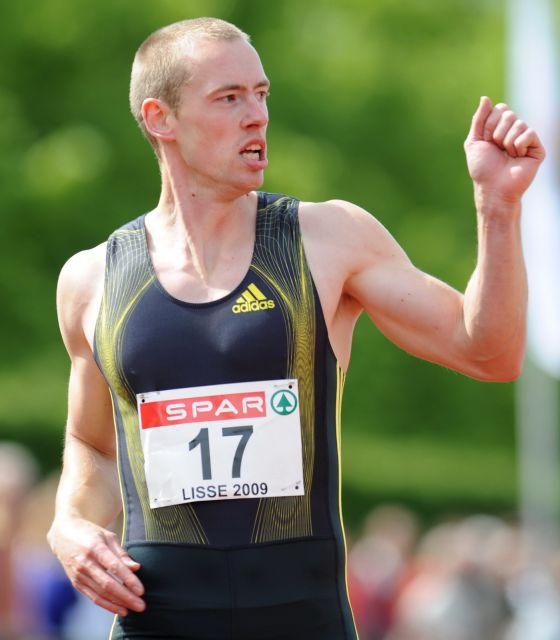
Beyens at the 2009 Ter Specke Bokaal Meeting in Lisse, the Netherlands.

Kristof Beyens (born 13 July 1983 in Herentals) is a Belgian sprint athlete, who specialises in the 100 and 200 metres. His personal best time over 200 metres is 20.44 s, achieved in Osaka during the World Championships.

Beyens finished fourth in the 200 metres final at the 2006 European Athletics Championships in Gothenburg. In the same year, he was awarded the Gouden Spike. He also competed in the 2005 World Athletics Championships in the same event, reaching the second round.

Beyens represented Belgium at the 2008 Summer Olympics in Beijing. He competed in the 200 metres and placed third in his first round heat after Rondel Sorrillo and Usain Bolt in a time of 20.69 seconds. He improved his time in the second round to 20.50 seconds and placed third again, this time behind Brendan Christian and Churandy Martina. He ran his semi final race in 20.69 seconds and placed eighth in his heat, which was not enough to reach the final.

== Palmares ==
2001
7th, European U19 Championships, 200m
7th, European U19 Championships, 4x100m
2006
4th, European Championships, 200m

== Personal bests ==
Outdoor
100m – 10"32 (2003)
200m – 20"44 (2007)
300m – 33"49 (2002)
400m – 49"17 (2002)
Indoor
60m – 6"80 (2008, Ghent)
200m – 21"27 (2006, Ghent)
