= Oudéré Kankarafou =

French sprinter

Medal record

Representing France

Men's athletics

European Championships
Bronze medal – third place	2006 Gothenburg	4 × 100 m relay

Oudéré Kankarafou (born 8 December 1983 in Tapan, Togo) is a French sprinter who specializes in the 100 metres.

In the 4 × 100 metres relay event he won a bronze medal at the 2006 European Championships and finished seventh at the 2006 World Cup.

He competed individually at the 2006 World Indoor Championships and the 2006 European Championships without reaching the final round.

His personal best time is 10.25 seconds, achieved in July 2006 in Tomblaine.
