= Marius Broening =

German sprinter

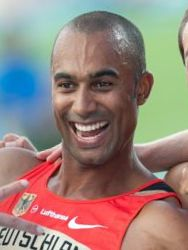
- Marius Broening at the 2010 European Championships.

Medal record

Representing Germany

Men's athletics

European Championships
| Bronze medal – third place | 2010 Barcelona | 4 x 100 m relay |

Marius Broening (born 24 October 1983) is a German sprinter who specializes in the 100 metres.

He finished seventh in 4 × 100 m relay at the 2005 World Championships, together with teammates Alexander Kosenkow, Marc Blume and Tobias Unger and fifth at the 2006 European Championships with Kosenkow, Sebastian Ernst and Ronny Ostwald.

His personal best time is 10.30 seconds, achieved in July 2004 in Braunschweig.
