= Eddy De Lépine =

French sprinter (born 1984)

Personal information
- Born: 30 March 1984 (age 42) Fort-de-France, Martinique
- Height: 175 cm (5 ft 9 in)
- Weight: 73 kg (161 lb)

Sport
- Country: France
- Sport: Athletics
- Club: ASC Zenith
Medal record
Men's athletics
Representing France
World Championships
Gold medal – first place	2005 Helsinki	4 × 100 m relay
Representing Martinique
CARIFTA Games Junior (U20)
Gold medal – first place	2003 Port of Spain	110 m hurdles
Silver medal – second place	2001 Bridgetown	110 m hurdles
CARIFTA Games Youth (U17)
Gold medal – first place	2000 St. George's	Triple jump
Bronze medal – third place	2000 St. George's	Long jump

Eddy De Lépine (born 30 March 1984 in Fort-de-France, Martinique) is a French sprinter. Together with Ladji Doucouré, Ronald Pognon, and Lueyi Dovy, he won a gold medal in 4 × 100 metres relay at the 2005 World Championships in Athletics.

He competed for France at the 2004 Summer Olympics; at the 2006 European Athletics Championships finished 6th in the 200 m.

== Personal bests ==
- 100 metres - 10.19 (2003)
- 200 metres - 20.62 (2004)
