= David Alerte =

French sprinter (born 1984)

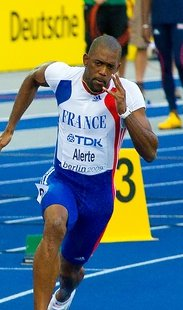
- Alerte at the 2009 World Championships

Personal information
- Nationality: France
- Born: 18 September 1984 (age 41) La Trinité, Martinique
- Height: 192 cm (6 ft 4 in)
- Weight: 83 kg (183 lb)

Sport
- Sport: Running

Achievements and titles
- Personal bests: 100m: 10.27 200m: 20.33 400m: 46.64
Medal record
Men's athletics
Representing France
European Championships
| Bronze medal – third place | 2006 Gothenburg | 4×100 m relay |
Representing Martinique
CARIFTA Games Junior (U20)
| Silver medal – second place | 2002 Nassau | Long jump |

David Alerte (born 18 September 1984 in La Trinité, Martinique) is a French sprinter who specializes in the 200 metres.

At the 2006 European Championships in Gothenburg he finished seventh in the 200 metres and won a bronze medal in the 4 x 100 metres relay. He also competed in the 4 × 100 m relay team for France in the 2004 Olympic Games, and in 200 metres at the 2004 World Indoor Championships.

His personal best time is 20.33 seconds, achieved in August 2007 in Niort. He also has 10.27 seconds in the 100 metres, achieved in July 2006 in Dreux, and 46.64 seconds in the 400 metres, achieved in May 2004 in St. George's.
