= 2004 World Junior Championships in Athletics – Men's 4 × 100 metres relay =

Men's 4x100 metres relay event

The men's 4x100 metres relay event at the 2004 World Junior Championships in Athletics was held in Grosseto, Italy, at Stadio Olimpico Carlo Zecchini on 17 and 18 July.

== Medalists ==
Gold	Trell Kimmons; Demi Omole; Ivory Williams; LaShawn Merritt; United States
Silver	Kawayne Fisher; Kevin Stewart; Andre Wellington; Renaldo Rose; Jamaica
Bronze	Naohiro Shinada; Hiroyuki Noda; Yuichi Shokawa; Naoki Tsukahara; Japan

== Results ==
=== Final ===
18 July

Rank	Nation	Competitors	Time	Notes
1st place, gold medalist(s)	United States	Trell Kimmons; Demi Omole; Ivory Williams; LaShawn Merritt	38.66	
2nd place, silver medalist(s)	Jamaica	Kawayne Fisher; Kevin Stewart; Andre Wellington; Renaldo Rose	39.27	
3rd place, bronze medalist(s)	Japan	Naohiro Shinada; Hiroyuki Noda; Yuichi Shokawa; Naoki Tsukahara	39.43	
4	Germany	Joachim Welz; Daniel Schnelting; Florian Rentz; Lucas Jakubczyk	40.00	
5	Poland	Leszek Spychala; Dariusz Kuć; Dariusz Burzynski; Karol Sienkiewicz	40.13	
6	Cyprus	Georgios Lavithis; George Georgiou; Georgios Kyriakides; Valentinos Athanasiou	40.50	
7	Botswana	Pedzani Madubeko; Bonno Modisenyane; Cisco Matsaakgang; Obakeng Ngwigwa	40.83	
	United Kingdom	Craig Pickering; Rikki Fifton; James Ellington; Leon Baptiste	DQ	IAAF rule 170.14

=== Heats ===
17 July

==== Heat 1 ====
Rank	Nation	Competitors	Time	Notes
1	Japan	Naohiro Shinada; Hiroyuki Noda; Yuichi Shokawa; Naoki Tsukahara	39.59	Q
2	Jamaica	Kawayne Fisher; Kevin Stewart; Nesta Carter; Renaldo Rose	39.90	Q
3	Botswana	Cisco Matsaakgang; Bonno Modisenyane; Pedzani Madubeko; Obakeng Ngwigwa	40.01	q
4	Finland	Jarkko Ruostekivi; Visa Hongisto; Antti Vainionpää; Rami Jokinen	40.58	
	Australia	Brandan Galic; Matt Davies; Jacob Groth; John Thornell	DQ	IAAF rule 170.14
	Greece	Konstadínos Papazafíris; Ioánnis Apostólou; Panayiótis Hrisospáthis; Theódoros Mathioudákis	DNF	

==== Heat 2 ====
Rank	Nation	Competitors	Time	Notes
1	United States	Trell Kimmons; Demi Omole; Ivory Williams; LaShawn Merritt	38.96	Q
2	Poland	Leszek Spychala; Dariusz Kuć; Dariusz Burzynski; Karol Sienkiewicz	39.95	Q
3	Germany	Joachim Welz; Daniel Schnelting; Florian Rentz; Lucas Jakubczyk	40.04	q
4	Nigeria	Peter Emelieze; Shola Anota; Udomsinachi Erete; Anthony Alozie	40.36	
5	Bahamas	Don Wood; Grafton Ifill; Derek Carey; Michael Sands, Jr.	40.44	
6	India	Arvind Alaguvel; Vishal Saxena; Mohamed Muddassir; Rahamatulla Molla	41.34	
	Sweden	Edmund Yeboah; Per Strandquist; Lukas Nilsson; Stefan Tärnhuvud	DNF	

==== Heat 3 ====
Rank	Nation	Competitors	Time	Notes
1	United Kingdom	Craig Pickering; Rikki Fifton; James Ellington; Leon Baptiste	39.72	Q
2	Cyprus	Georgios Lavithis; George Georgiou; Georgios Kyriakides; Valentinos Athanasiou	40.44	Q
3	New Zealand	Matt Brown; Graeme Read; Cory Innes; Jeffery Thumath	40.64	
4	Oman	Ahmed Nasser Al-Waheibi; Juma Al-Jabri; Abdullah Al-Souli; Yousef Awlad Thani	41.57	
	France	Cédric Laurier; Martial Mbandjock; Benjamin Chevrol; Christophe Bonnet	DNF	
	Switzerland	David Gallay; Marco Cribari; Cédric Le Glaunec; Phillipp Dünki	DNF	

== Participation ==
According to an unofficial count, 77 athletes from 19 countries participated in the event.

- Australia (4)
- Bahamas (4)
- Botswana (4)
- Cyprus (4)
- Finland (4)
- France (4)
- Germany (4)
- Greece (4)
- India (4)
- Jamaica (5)
- Japan (4)
- New Zealand (4)
- Nigeria (4)
- Oman (4)
- Poland (4)
- Sweden (4)
- Switzerland (4)
- United Kingdom (4)
- United States (4)
