= 2006 World Junior Championships in Athletics – Men's 4 × 100 metres relay =

The men's 4x100 metres relay event at the 2006 World Junior Championships in Athletics was held in Beijing, China, at Chaoyang Sports Centre on 19 and 20 August.

== Medalists ==
Gold	Winston Barnes; Renaldo Rose; Cawayne Jervis; Yohan Blake; Jamaica
Silver	Evander Wells; Gordon McKenzie; Willie Perry; Brandon Myers; United States
Bronze	Rion Pierre; Alex Nelson; Wade Bennett-Jackson; Harry Aikines-Aryeetey; United Kingdom

== Results ==
=== Final ===
20 August

Rank	Nation	Competitors	Time	Notes
1st place, gold medalist(s)	Jamaica	Winston Barnes; Renaldo Rose; Cawayne Jervis; Yohan Blake	39.05	
2nd place, silver medalist(s)	United States	Evander Wells; Gordon McKenzie; Willie Perry; Brandon Myers	39.21	
3rd place, bronze medalist(s)	United Kingdom	Rion Pierre; Alex Nelson; Wade Bennett-Jackson; Harry Aikines-Aryeetey	39.24	
4	Canada	Justyn Warner; Oluseyi Smith; Andrew Dargie; Bryan Barnett	39.78	
5	Poland	Karol Kleina; Jacek Roszko; Jakub Lewandowicz; Mateusz Pluta	39.98	
6	Russia	Mikhail Idrisov; Ramis Abdulkaderov; Igor Shevtsov; Gleb Tkachenko	40.03	
	Germany	Georg Petzold; Christian Blum; Nils Müller; Julian Reus	DNF	
	Nigeria	Ogho-Oghene Egwero; Obinna Metu; Ayokunle Odelusi; Ahmed Akinlawon	DNF	

=== Heats ===
19 August

==== Heat 1 ====
Rank	Nation	Competitors	Time	Notes
1	Russia	Mikhail Idrisov; Ramis Abdulkaderov; Igor Shevtsov; Gleb Tkachenko	40.06	Q
2	Germany	Georg Petzold; Christian Blum; Nils Müller; Julian Reus	40.07	Q
3	Australia	Brandan Galic; Aaron Rouge-Serret; Kurt Mulcahy; Andrew Yong	40.11	
4	Japan	Shogo Arao; Yusuke Ishitsuka; Daiki Goto; Takafumi Kumamoto	40.17	
5	Oman	Barakat Al-Harthi; Ahmed Nasser Al-Waheibi; Abdullah Al-Souli; Mohamed Al-Rawahi	40.53	
6	Cayman Islands	Kemar Hyman; Tyrell Cuffy; Maxwell Hyman; Rhymiech Adolphus	40.92	
7	Italy	Gavino Dettori; Giuseppe Aita; Alessandro Berdini; Matteo Galvan	41.59	

==== Heat 2 ====
Rank	Nation	Competitors	Time	Notes
1	United States	Evander Wells; Gordon McKenzie; Odell Harris; Brandon Myers	39.50	Q
2	Canada	Justyn Warner; Oluseyi Smith; Todd Pyper; Bryan Barnett	39.64	Q
3	Poland	Karol Kleina; Jacek Roszko; Jakub Lewandowicz; Mateusz Pluta	39.84	q
4	Thailand	Srimunta Montree; Taweesak Pooltong; Tawarit Chantaphan; Yutthapong Muadmueng	39.92	
5	Spain	José Andujar; Javier Sanz; José Enrique Pérez; Marc Altés	40.22	
6	Sweden	Edmund Yeboah; Per Strandquist; Erik Karlsson; Simon Johansson	40.28	
7	Senegal	Moussa Dembélé; Aliou Wagne; Khadim Diouf; Katim Touré	43.21	
	China	Chen Yibo; Zhang Peimeng; Yin Hualong; Liang Jiahong	DQ	

==== Heat 3 ====
Rank	Nation	Competitors	Time	Notes
1	Jamaica	Winston Barnes; Renaldo Rose; Cawayne Jervis; Yohan Blake	39.18	Q
2	United Kingdom	Ryan Scott; Harry Aikines-Aryeetey; Wade Bennett-Jackson; Leevan Yearwood	39.30	Q
3	Nigeria	Ogho-Oghene Egwero; Obinna Metu; Ayokunle Odelusi; Ahmed Akinlawon	39.68	q
4	France	Yannick Lesourd; Philémon Mubiayi; Alexandre Adalbert; Nyls Nubret	40.16	
5	Chinese Taipei	Liang Tse-Ching; Yi Wei-Chen; Wang Ching-Chun; Ho Hsien-Tsung	40.33	
6	South Africa	Ruaan Grobler; Willem de Beer; Kagisho Kumbane; Wilhelm van der Vyver	40.36	
7	Singapore	Mohd Amiruddin Jamal; Muhd Yusof Azhari; Lee Cheng Wei; Calvin Kang Li Loong	41.74	

== Participation ==
According to an unofficial count, 92 athletes from 22 countries participated in the event.

- Australia (4)
- Canada (5)
- Cayman Islands (4)
- China (4)
- Chinese Taipei (4)
- France (4)
- Germany (4)
- Italy (4)
- Jamaica (4)
- Japan (4)
- Nigeria (4)
- Oman (4)
- Poland (4)
- Russia (4)
- Senegal (4)
- Singapore (4)
- South Africa (4)
- Spain (4)
- Sweden (4)
- Thailand (4)
- United Kingdom (6)
- United States (5)
