= 2004 World Junior Championships in Athletics – Men's 100 metres =

The men's 100 metres event at the 2004 World Junior Championships in Athletics was held in Grosseto, Italy, at Stadio Olimpico Carlo Zecchini on 13 and 14 July.

== Medalists ==
Gold	Ivory Williams; United States
Silver	Demi Omole; United States
Bronze	Renaldo Rose; Jamaica

== Results ==
=== Final ===
14 July
Wind: +1.0 m/s

Rank	Name	Nationality	Time	Notes
1st place, gold medalist(s)	Ivory Williams	United States	10.29	
2nd place, silver medalist(s)	Demi Omole	United States	10.31	
3rd place, bronze medalist(s)	Renaldo Rose	Jamaica	10.34	
4	Daniel Bailey	Antigua and Barbuda	10.39	
5	Yahya Al-Ghahes	Saudi Arabia	10.40	
6	Grafton Ifill	Bahamas	10.51	
7	James Ellington	United Kingdom	10.56	
8	Efthímios Steryioúlis	Greece	10.58	

=== Semifinals ===
13 July

==== Semifinal 1 ====
Wind: +1.6 m/s

Rank	Name	Nationality	Time	Notes
1	Daniel Bailey	Antigua and Barbuda	10.19	Q
2	Demi Omole	United States	10.19	Q
3	Renaldo Rose	Jamaica	10.36	q
4	Grafton Ifill	Bahamas	10.39	q NJR
5	Shannon King	Canada	10.47	
6	Brian Mariano	Netherlands Antilles	10.55	
7	Jacob Groth	Australia	10.63	
8	Yahya Ibrahim	Saudi Arabia	11.37	

==== Semifinal 2 ====
Wind: +0.3 m/s

Rank	Name	Nationality	Time	Notes
1	Yahya Al-Ghahes	Saudi Arabia	10.38	Q
2	Efthímios Steryioúlis	Greece	10.46	Q
3	Edmund Yeboah	Sweden	10.53	
4	Naoki Tsukahara	Japan	10.55	
5	Leigh Julius	South Africa	10.56	
6	Karol Sienkiewicz	Poland	10.67	
7	Andre Wellington	Jamaica	10.72	
8	Daniel Grueso	Colombia	10.73	

==== Semifinal 3 ====
Wind: +0.8 m/s

Rank	Name	Nationality	Time	Notes
1	Ivory Williams	United States	10.30	Q
2	James Ellington	United Kingdom	10.41	Q
3	Leon Baptiste	United Kingdom	10.48	
4	Anthony Alozie	Nigeria	10.56	
5	Per Strandquist	Sweden	10.63	
6	Joachim Welz	Germany	10.75	
7	Derek Carey	Bahamas	10.78	
8	Yavid Zackey	Puerto Rico	10.83	

=== Heats ===
13 July

==== Heat 1 ====
Wind: -0.2 m/s

Rank	Name	Nationality	Time	Notes
1	Ivory Williams	United States	10.41	Q
2	Edmund Yeboah	Sweden	10.64	Q
3	Shannon King	Canada	10.67	q
4	Jean Du Randt	South Africa	10.80	
5	Cédric Laurier	France	10.93	
6	Mohammad Al-Masri	Jordan	11.61	

==== Heat 2 ====
Wind: +1.9 m/s

Rank	Name	Nationality	Time	Notes
1	Anthony Alozie	Nigeria	10.53	Q
2	Jacob Groth	Australia	10.61	Q
3	Moroni Rubio	Mexico	10.78	
4	Jaroslav Šmotek	Czech Republic	10.93	
5	Mervin Loizeau	Seychelles	10.94	
6	Jeandre Mallia	Malta	11.15	
7	Tang Yue Han	Singapore	11.20	
8	Matawesi Telawa	Fiji	11.23	

==== Heat 3 ====
Wind: -1.6 m/s

Rank	Name	Nationality	Time	Notes
1	Demi Omole	United States	10.45	Q
2	Yahya Ibrahim	Saudi Arabia	10.63	Q
3	Kael Becerra	Chile	10.73	
4	Hank Palmer	Canada	10.76	
5	Arnaldo Abrantes	Portugal	10.93	
6	Wong Ka Chun	Hong Kong	11.39	
7	Jean-Homère Fevry	Haiti	11.79	

==== Heat 4 ====
Wind: -0.2 m/s

Rank	Name	Nationality	Time	Notes
1	Renaldo Rose	Jamaica	10.67	Q
2	Derek Carey	Bahamas	10.75	Q
3	Dariusz Kuć	Poland	10.83	
4	Christophe Bonnet	France	10.84	
5	Ibrahim Firdaus	Brunei	11.90	
	Othman Raqib	Morocco	DQ	IAAF rule 162.7
	Mario Vona	Germany	DNF	

==== Heat 5 ====
Wind: +1.4 m/s

Rank	Name	Nationality	Time	Notes
1	Efthímios Steryioúlis	Greece	10.49	Q
2	Andre Wellington	Jamaica	10.56	Q
3	Brian Mariano	Netherlands Antilles	10.69	q
4	Sompote Suwannarangsri	Thailand	10.70	
5	Alessandro Minen	Italy	10.74	
6	Lovintz Tota	Bermuda	10.75	
7	Kumi 'Uhila	Tonga	11.65	
8	Moosa Khaleel	Maldives	12.03	

==== Heat 6 ====
Wind: +1.0 m/s

Rank	Name	Nationality	Time	Notes
1	Leon Baptiste	United Kingdom	10.53	Q
2	Grafton Ifill	Bahamas	10.54	Q
3	Desislav Gunev	Bulgaria	10.71	
4	Ram Mor	Israel	10.91	
5	Matija Krasevec	Slovenia	10.95	
6	Viphakone Phommanivong	Laos	11.84	
7	Elterson Rodriguez	Federated States of Micronesia	12.13	

==== Heat 7 ====
Wind: 0.0 m/s

Rank	Name	Nationality	Time	Notes
1	Leigh Julius	South Africa	10.53	Q
2	Naoki Tsukahara	Japan	10.60	Q
3	Daniel Grueso	Colombia	10.70	q
4	Matt Davies	Australia	10.70	
5	Peter Emelieze	Nigeria	10.81	
6	Philip Stanek	Austria	11.04	
7	Rhymeich Rockette	Cayman Islands	11.17	

==== Heat 8 ====
Wind: +1.8 m/s

Rank	Name	Nationality	Time	Notes
1	Yahya Al-Ghahes	Saudi Arabia	10.42	Q
2	Yavid Zackey	Puerto Rico	10.57	Q
3	Joachim Welz	Germany	10.64	q
4	Karol Sienkiewicz	Poland	10.65	q
5	Anton Lui	Papua New Guinea	10.82	
6	Jack Iroga	Solomon Islands	11.32	
7	Omar Harvey	Turks and Caicos Islands	11.79	
8	Deamo Baguga	Nauru	11.89	

==== Heat 9 ====
Wind: -0.7 m/s

Rank	Name	Nationality	Time	Notes
1	Daniel Bailey	Antigua and Barbuda	10.45	Q
2	James Ellington	United Kingdom	10.59	Q
3	Per Strandquist	Sweden	10.70	q
4	Chriswill De Wee	Namibia	10.79	
5	Aung Wai Phyo	Myanmar	11.13	
6	Rabangaki Nawai	Kiribati	16.70	
7	Dramane Ouédraogo	Burkina Faso	39.39	

== Participation ==
According to an unofficial count, 65 athletes from 52 countries participated in the event.

- Antigua and Barbuda (1)
- Australia (2)
- Austria (1)
- Bahamas (2)
- Bermuda (1)
- Brunei (1)
- Bulgaria (1)
- Burkina Faso (1)
- Canada (2)
- Cayman Islands (1)
- Chile (1)
- Colombia (1)
- Czech Republic (1)
- Fiji (1)
- France (2)
- Germany (2)
- Greece (1)
- Haiti (1)
- Hong Kong (1)
- Israel (1)
- Italy (1)
- Jamaica (2)
- Japan (1)
- Jordan (1)
- Kiribati (1)
- Laos (1)
- Maldives (1)
- Malta (1)
- Mexico (1)
- Federated States of Micronesia (1)
- Morocco (1)
- Myanmar (1)
- Namibia (1)
- Nauru (1)
- Netherlands Antilles (1)
- Nigeria (2)
- Papua New Guinea (1)
- Poland (2)
- Portugal (1)
- Puerto Rico (1)
- Saudi Arabia (2)
- Seychelles (1)
- Singapore (1)
- Slovenia (1)
- Solomon Islands (1)
- South Africa (2)
- Sweden (2)
- Thailand (1)
- Tonga (1)
- Turks and Caicos Islands (1)
- United Kingdom (2)
- United States (2)
