= 2006 World Junior Championships in Athletics – Men's 100 metres =

The men's 100 metres event at the 2006 World Junior Championships in Athletics was held in Beijing, China, at Chaoyang Sports Centre on 15 and 16 August.

== Medalists ==
Gold	Harry Aikines-Aryeetey; United Kingdom
Silver	Justyn Warner; Canada
Bronze	Yohan Blake; Jamaica

== Results ==
=== Final ===
16 August
Wind: -0.5 m/s

Rank	Name	Nationality	Time	Notes
1st place, gold medalist(s)	Harry Aikines-Aryeetey	United Kingdom	10.37	
2nd place, silver medalist(s)	Justyn Warner	Canada	10.39	
3rd place, bronze medalist(s)	Yohan Blake	Jamaica	10.42	
4	Renaldo Rose	Jamaica	10.43	
5	Liang Jiahong	China	10.43	
6	Wade Bennett-Jackson	United Kingdom	10.45	
7	Keston Bledman	Trinidad and Tobago	10.47	
8	Obinna Metu	Nigeria	10.50	

=== Semifinals ===
15 August

==== Semifinal 1 ====
Wind: -0.4 m/s

Rank	Name	Nationality	Time	Notes
1	Yohan Blake	Jamaica	10.43	Q
2	Justyn Warner	Canada	10.48	Q
3	Wade Bennett-Jackson	United Kingdom	10.48	q
4	Visa Hongisto	Finland	10.64	
5	Daiki Goto	Japan	10.67	
6	Kemar Hyman	Cayman Islands	10.81	
7	Rolf Njouongué-Fongué	Switzerland	11.03	
	Todd Bateman	Australia	DNS	

==== Semifinal 2 ====
Wind: -0.5 m/s

Rank	Name	Nationality	Time	Notes
1	Harry Aikines-Aryeetey	United Kingdom	10.38	Q
2	Renaldo Rose	Jamaica	10.45	Q
3	Ahmed Akinlawon	Nigeria	10.55	
4	Jacek Roszko	Poland	10.61	
5	Oluseyi Smith	Canada	10.75	
6	Ngonidzashe Makusha	Zimbabwe	10.84	
7	Mikhail Idrisov	Russia	10.86	
	Dayne Le Kay	South Africa	DNS	

==== Semifinal 3 ====
Wind: -0.9 m/s

Rank	Name	Nationality	Time	Notes
1	Liang Jiahong	China	10.48	Q
2	Keston Bledman	Trinidad and Tobago	10.52	Q
3	Obinna Metu	Nigeria	10.54	q
4	Aaron Rouge-Serret	Australia	10.57	
5	Christian Blum	Germany	10.59	
6	Ronalds Arājs	Latvia	10.63	
7	Willie Perry	United States	10.64	
	Miklós Szebeny	Hungary	DQ	

=== Heats ===
15 August

==== Heat 1 ====
Wind: +0.9 m/s

Rank	Name	Nationality	Time	Notes
1	Ahmed Akinlawon	Nigeria	10.54	Q
2	Rolf Njouongué-Fongué	Switzerland	10.64	Q
3	Gordon McKenzie	United States	10.74	
4	Csaba Antalóczi	Hungary	10.78	
5	Nicolás Piorno	Argentina	10.82	
6	Gabriel Mvumvure	Zimbabwe	10.93	
7	Kokurlo Roberts	Liberia	11.04	
8	Muhammad Asif Javed	Pakistan	11.53	

==== Heat 2 ====
Wind: +0.6 m/s

Rank	Name	Nationality	Time	Notes
1	Yohan Blake	Jamaica	10.52	Q
2	Dayne Le Kay	South Africa	10.63	Q
3	Franklin Nazareno	Ecuador	10.64	
4	Shogo Arao	Japan	10.67	
5	Jakub Lewandowicz	Poland	10.75	
6	Yi Wei-Chen	Chinese Taipei	10.76	
7	Ramil Guliyev	Azerbaijan	10.91	
8	Khiev Samnang	Cambodia	11.91	

==== Heat 3 ====
Wind: +0.9 m/s

Rank	Name	Nationality	Time	Notes
1	Aaron Rouge-Serret	Australia	10.43	Q
2	Harry Aikines-Aryeetey	United Kingdom	10.45	Q
3	Obinna Metu	Nigeria	10.59	q
4	Julian Reus	Germany	10.67	
5	Richard Richardson	Antigua and Barbuda	10.71	
6	Giovanni Codrington	Netherlands	10.82	
7	Carl Stuart	Bahamas	10.85	
8	Haita Bonyafala	DR Congo	11.31	

==== Heat 4 ====
Wind: +1.0 m/s

Rank	Name	Nationality	Time	Notes
1	Wade Bennett-Jackson	United Kingdom	10.33	Q
2	Kemar Hyman	Cayman Islands	10.50	Q
3	Ronalds Arājs	Latvia	10.54	q
4	Yin Hualong	China	10.64	
5	Lai Chun Ho	Hong Kong	10.69	
6	Ahmed Bongo	Mauritius	10.70	
7	Philémon Mubiayi	France	10.74	
8	Jonathan Williams	Côte d'Ivoire	10.82	

==== Heat 5 ====
Wind: +1.5 m/s

Rank	Name	Nationality	Time	Notes
1	Christian Blum	Germany	10.47	Q
2	Daiki Goto	Japan	10.54	Q
3	Todd Bateman	Australia	10.62	q
4	Matija Čop	Croatia	10.68	
5	Abdullah Al-Souli	Oman	10.69	
6	Gavino Dettori	Italy	10.75	
7	José Andujar	Spain	10.87	
8	Serge Tcheuko	Cameroon	11.00	

==== Heat 6 ====
Wind: +0.5 m/s

Rank	Name	Nationality	Time	Notes
1	Willie Perry	United States	10.58	Q
2	Ngonidzashe Makusha	Zimbabwe	10.77	Q
3	Tyrell Cuffy	Cayman Islands	10.87	
4	Miloš Savic	Serbia	10.88	
5	Lin Pao-Tung	Chinese Taipei	10.98	
6	Christian Desulme	Haiti	11.09	
7	Mervin Loizeau	Seychelles	11.18	
8	Rizzier Okoumou	Congo	11.36	
9	Uikelotu Palu	Tonga	11.44	

==== Heat 7 ====
Wind: +0.4 m/s

Rank	Name	Nationality	Time	Notes
1	Keston Bledman	Trinidad and Tobago	10.59	Q
2	Visa Hongisto	Finland	10.66	Q
3	Lim Jae-Yoel	South Korea	10.80	
4	Yip Siu Keung	Hong Kong	10.95	
5	Holder da Silva	Guinea-Bissau	11.01	
6	Duncan McLean	South Africa	11.35	
7	Alfred Adison	Solomon Islands	11.91	

==== Heat 8 ====
Wind: +0.1 m/s

Rank	Name	Nationality	Time	Notes
1	Justyn Warner	Canada	10.53	Q
2	Miklós Szebeny	Hungary	10.58	Q
3	Mikhail Idrisov	Russia	10.61	q
4	Jerrel Feller	Netherlands	10.69	
5	Mahmoud Taha	Bahrain	10.89	
6	Ahmed Al-Obaid	Saudi Arabia	10.99	
7	Ángel Miret	Andorra	11.50	
8	Tim Natua	Kiribati	11.81	

==== Heat 9 ====
Wind: +1.0 m/s

Rank	Name	Nationality	Time	Notes
1	Jacek Roszko	Poland	10.50	Q
2	Liang Jiahong	China	10.55	Q
3	Reto Schenkel	Switzerland	10.72	
4	Nedim Covic	Bosnia and Herzegovina	10.80	
5	Jason Smyth	Ireland	10.85	
6	Han Myung-Jun	South Korea	11.06	
7	Agus Setiyawan	Indonesia	11.27	
8	Souksavanh Tonsacktheva	Laos	11.68	

==== Heat 10 ====
Wind: +1.3 m/s

Rank	Name	Nationality	Time	Notes
1	Renaldo Rose	Jamaica	10.40	Q
2	Oluseyi Smith	Canada	10.54	Q
3	Katim Touré	Senegal	10.63	
4	Taweesak Pooltong	Thailand	10.64	
5	Yannick Lesourd	France	10.66	
6	Edmund Yeboah	Sweden	10.72	
7	Withley Williams	Saint Kitts and Nevis	10.84	
8	Tyrone Omar	Northern Mariana Islands	11.12	

== Participation ==
According to an unofficial count, 80 athletes from 60 countries participated in the event.

- Andorra (1)
- Antigua and Barbuda (1)
- Argentina (1)
- Australia (2)
- Azerbaijan (1)
- Bahamas (1)
- Bahrain (1)
- Bosnia and Herzegovina (1)
- Cambodia (1)
- Cameroon (1)
- Canada (2)
- Cayman Islands (2)
- China (2)
- Chinese Taipei (2)
- Congo (1)
- DR Congo (1)
- Côte d'Ivoire (1)
- Croatia (1)
- Ecuador (1)
- Finland (1)
- France (2)
- Germany (2)
- Guinea-Bissau (1)
- Haiti (1)
- Hong Kong (2)
- Hungary (2)
- Indonesia (1)
- Ireland (1)
- Italy (1)
- Jamaica (2)
- Japan (2)
- Kiribati (1)
- Laos (1)
- Latvia (1)
- Liberia (1)
- Mauritius (1)
- Netherlands (2)
- Nigeria (2)
- Northern Mariana Islands (1)
- Oman (1)
- Pakistan (1)
- Poland (2)
- Russia (1)
- Saint Kitts and Nevis (1)
- Saudi Arabia (1)
- Senegal (1)
- Serbia (1)
- Seychelles (1)
- Solomon Islands (1)
- South Africa (2)
- South Korea (2)
- Spain (1)
- Sweden (1)
- Switzerland (2)
- Thailand (1)
- Tonga (1)
- Trinidad and Tobago (1)
- United Kingdom (2)
- United States (2)
- Zimbabwe (2)
