= 2004 World Junior Championships in Athletics – Men's long jump =

International sporting competition

The men's long jump event at the 2004 World Junior Championships in Athletics was held in Grosseto, Italy, at Stadio Olimpico Carlo Zecchini on 13 and 14 July.

== Medalists ==
Gold	Andrew Howe; Italy
Silver	Khotso Mokoena; South Africa
Bronze	John Thornell; Australia

== Results ==
=== Final ===
14 July

Rank	Name	Nationality	Attempts						Result	Notes
Rank	Name	Nationality	1	2	3	4	5	6	Result	Notes
1st place, gold medalist(s)	Andrew Howe	Italy	7.94 (w: +1.0 m/s)	7.74 (w: 0.0 m/s)	7.68 (w: -0.2 m/s)	7.70 (w: +0.7 m/s)	8.11 (w: +0.9 m/s)	7.85 (w: +0.4 m/s)	8.11 (w: +0.9 m/s)	
2nd place, silver medalist(s)	Khotso Mokoena	South Africa	7.80 (w: 0.0 m/s)	7.84 (w: +0.3 m/s)	7.99 (w: 0.0 m/s)	8.00 (w: +0.9 m/s)	8.09 (w: +0.7 m/s)	8.06 (w: +0.7 m/s)	8.09 (w: +0.7 m/s)	
3rd place, bronze medalist(s)	John Thornell	Australia	7.71 (w: -0.4 m/s)	7.77 (w: -0.9 m/s)	7.89 (w: +0.3 m/s)	x	7.77 (w: +1.1 m/s)	7.85 (w: -0.1 m/s)	7.89 (w: +0.3 m/s)	
4	Chris Noffke	Australia	7.53 (w: -0.3 m/s)	7.50 (w: +0.2 m/s)	7.44 (w: -0.1 m/s)	7.36 (w: +0.7 m/s)	7.63 (w: +1.0 m/s)	7.66 (w: +0.9 m/s)	7.66 (w: +0.9 m/s)	
5	Naohiro Shinada	Japan	7.58 (w: +0.8 m/s)	x	7.66 (w: +0.5 m/s)	7.41 (w: +0.5 m/s)	x	x	7.66 (w: +0.5 m/s)	
6	Yu Zhenwei	China	x	7.48 (w: +0.4 m/s)	7.39 (w: +1.1 m/s)	7.55 (w: +1.2 m/s)	x	7.45 (w: +0.5 m/s)	7.55 (w: +1.2 m/s)	
7	Dmitriy Bilotserkiv'kyy	Ukraine	7.52 (w: +0.7 m/s)	x	x	7.23 (w: +0.8 m/s)	7.51 (w: +0.9 m/s)	x	7.52 (w: +0.7 m/s)	
8	Nikólaos Filandarákis	Greece	7.21 (w: +0.9 m/s)	7.35 (w: 0.0 m/s)	7.49 (w: -0.2 m/s)	7.35 (w: +0.4 m/s)	7.29 (w: +1.4 m/s)	7.37 (w: +0.7 m/s)	7.49 (w: -0.2 m/s)	
9	Yuki Imai	Japan	7.26 (w: 0.0 m/s)	7.43 (w: +1.2 m/s)	7.19 (w: +0.4 m/s)				7.43 (w: +1.2 m/s)	
10	Jonathan Martínez	Spain	7.17 (w: 0.0 m/s)	7.14 (w: +0.5 m/s)	7.35 (w: +0.4 m/s)				7.35 (w: +0.4 m/s)	
11	Rogério Bispo	Brazil	7.34 (w: +0.2 m/s)	7.18 (w: +0.4 m/s)	5.12 (w: +0.6 m/s)				7.34 (w: +0.2 m/s)	
12	Wilbert Walker	Jamaica	7.10 (w: +0.9 m/s)	6.96 (w: +0.6 m/s)	x				7.10 (w: +0.9 m/s)	

=== Qualifications ===
13 July

==== Group A ====
Rank	Name	Nationality	Attempts			Result	Notes
Rank	Name	Nationality	1	2	3	Result	Notes
1	John Thornell	Australia	7.76 (w: -0.8 m/s)	-	-	7.76 (w: -0.8 m/s)	Q
2	Khotso Mokoena	South Africa	7.57 (w: -0.4 m/s)	7.67 (w: -0.6 m/s)	-	7.67 (w: -0.6 m/s)	Q
3	Naohiro Shinada	Japan	7.62 (w: +0.7 m/s)	7.53 (w: -0.1 m/s)	-	7.62 (w: +0.7 m/s)	q
4	Jonathan Martínez	Spain	x	7.19 (w: -0.4 m/s)	7.48 (w: +0.7 m/s)	7.48 (w: +0.7 m/s)	q
5	Wilbert Walker	Jamaica	7.39 (w: +0.4 m/s)	7.43 (w: +0.3 m/s)	7.25 (w: 0.0 m/s)	7.43 (w: +0.3 m/s)	q
6	Nikólaos Filandarákis	Greece	7.30 (w: +0.5 m/s)	7.21 (w: +0.3 m/s)	7.34 (w: 0.0 m/s)	7.34 (w: 0.0 m/s)	q
7	Nicolas Gomont	France	7.34 (w: -1.2 m/s)	x	7.23 (w: -0.1 m/s)	7.34 (w: -1.2 m/s)	
8	Clinton Koilparambil Jackson	India	7.33 (w: -0.8 m/s)	5.93 (w: -0.1 m/s)	7.19 (w: +0.6 m/s)	7.33 (w: -0.8 m/s)	
9	Claudiu Bujin	Romania	7.15 (w: -0.9 m/s)	7.28 (w: -0.4 m/s)	7.27 (w: +0.8 m/s)	7.28 (w: -0.4 m/s)	
10	Wang Minsheng	China	7.24 (w: +0.3 m/s)	7.28 (w: +0.4 m/s)	x	7.28 (w: +0.4 m/s)	
11	Sebastian Bayer	Germany	4.58 (w: -3.3 m/s)	5.40 (w: +0.5 m/s)	7.27 (w: +0.1 m/s)	7.27 (w: +0.1 m/s)	
12	Yevgeniy Trubchaninov	Russia	7.12 (w: +0.6 m/s)	7.07 (w: +0.4 m/s)	6.82 (w: -0.2 m/s)	7.12 (w: +0.6 m/s)	
13	Arsen Dermoyan	Armenia	6.99 (w: -0.8 m/s)	6.78 (w: -0.6 m/s)	6.60 (w: +0.3 m/s)	6.99 (w: -0.8 m/s)	
14	Federico Gorrieri	San Marino	6.78 (w: 0.0 m/s)	6.73 (w: +0.1 m/s)	x	6.78 (w: 0.0 m/s)	

==== Group B ====
Rank	Name	Nationality	Attempts			Result	Notes
Rank	Name	Nationality	1	2	3	Result	Notes
1	Andrew Howe	Italy	7.69 (w: -1.5 m/s)	-	-	7.69 (w: -1.5 m/s)	Q
2	Yu Zhenwei	China	x	7.52 (w: -0.3 m/s)	-	7.52 (w: -0.3 m/s)	q
3	Rogério Bispo	Brazil	6.87 (w: -1.0 m/s)	7.29 (w: 0.0 m/s)	7.47 (w: -0.8 m/s)	7.47 (w: -0.8 m/s)	q
4	Dmitriy Bilotserkiv'kyy	Ukraine	x	7.35 (w: +0.1 m/s)	7.34 (w: -0.8 m/s)	7.35 (w: +0.1 m/s)	q
5	Yuki Imai	Japan	7.26 (w: -0.7 m/s)	x	7.35 (w: -0.6 m/s)	7.35 (w: -0.6 m/s)	q
6	Chris Noffke	Australia	7.31 (w: -0.3 m/s)	7.34 (w: 0.0 m/s)	7.29 (w: +0.2 m/s)	7.34 (w: 0.0 m/s)	q
7	Lucas Jakubczyk	Germany	7.05 (w: -1.2 m/s)	7.05 (w: -0.4 m/s)	7.22 (w: -0.3 m/s)	7.22 (w: -0.3 m/s)	
8	Norris Frederick	United States	6.70 (w: -1.2 m/s)	7.13 (w: -0.5 m/s)	7.18 (w: +0.3 m/s)	7.18 (w: +0.3 m/s)	
9	Kim Deok-Hyeon	South Korea	7.12 (w: -1.2 m/s)	7.00 (w: -1.1 m/s)	7.06 (w: +0.3 m/s)	7.12 (w: -1.2 m/s)	
10	Chris Kirk	United Kingdom	7.06 (w: -0.7 m/s)	6.11 (w: 0.0 m/s)	x	7.06 (w: -0.7 m/s)	
11	Lovintz Tota	Bermuda	6.55 (w: -0.1 m/s)	7.02 (w: -1.0 m/s)	6.81 (w: +0.5 m/s)	7.02 (w: -1.0 m/s)	
12	Seo Suk-Kyun	South Korea	6.98 (w: -0.2 m/s)	x	x	6.98 (w: -0.2 m/s)	
13	Shola Anota	Nigeria	5.78 (w: -0.4 m/s)	6.18 (w: +0.4 m/s)	6.93 (w: -0.8 m/s)	6.93 (w: -0.8 m/s)	

== Participation ==
According to an unofficial count, 27 athletes from 22 countries participated in the event.

- Armenia (1)
- Australia (2)
- Bermuda (1)
- Brazil (1)
- China (2)
- France (1)
- Germany (2)
- Greece (1)
- India (1)
- Italy (1)
- Jamaica (1)
- Japan (2)
- Nigeria (1)
- Romania (1)
- Russia (1)
- San Marino (1)
- South Africa (1)
- South Korea (2)
- Spain (1)
- Ukraine (1)
- United Kingdom (1)
- United States (1)
