= 2006 World Junior Championships in Athletics – Men's 200 metres =

The men's 200 metres event at the 2006 World Junior Championships in Athletics was held in Beijing, China, at Chaoyang Sports Centre on 17 and 18 August.

== Medalists ==
Gold	Marek Niit; Estonia
Silver	Bryan Barnett; Canada
Bronze	Alex Nelson; United Kingdom

== Results ==
=== Final ===
18 August
Wind: -1.1 m/s

Rank	Name	Nationality	Time	Notes
1st place, gold medalist(s)	Marek Niit	Estonia	20.96	
2nd place, silver medalist(s)	Bryan Barnett	Canada	21.00	
3rd place, bronze medalist(s)	Alex Nelson	United Kingdom	21.14	
4	Igor Bodrov	Ukraine	21.17	
5	Ramon Gittens	Barbados	21.25	
6	Franklin Nazareno	Ecuador	21.25	
	Matteo Galvan	Italy	DQ	
	Dmitriy Ostrovsky	Ukraine	DQ	

=== Semifinals ===
17 August

==== Semifinal 1 ====
Wind: -1.0 m/s

Rank	Name	Nationality	Time	Notes
1	Dmitriy Ostrovsky	Ukraine	21.00	Q
2	Matteo Galvan	Italy	21.26	Q
3	Julian Reus	Germany	21.30	
4	Zhang Peimeng	China	21.34	
5	Yusuke Ishitsuka	Japan	21.41	
6	Kurt Mulcahy	Australia	21.42	
7	Jerrel Feller	Netherlands	21.47	
8	Kemar Hyman	Cayman Islands	21.54	

==== Semifinal 2 ====
Wind: -0.9 m/s

Rank	Name	Nationality	Time	Notes
1	Marek Niit	Estonia	21.06	Q
2	Alex Nelson	United Kingdom	21.19	Q
3	Willie Perry	United States	21.45	
4	Arnout Matthys	Belgium	21.49	
5	Nils Müller	Germany	21.68	
6	Matija Čop	Croatia	21.79	
7	Per Strandquist	Sweden	21.81	
	Visa Hongisto	Finland	DNS	

==== Semifinal 3 ====
Wind: -1.5 m/s

Rank	Name	Nationality	Time	Notes
1	Bryan Barnett	Canada	20.96	Q
2	Igor Bodrov	Ukraine	21.18	Q
3	Franklin Nazareno	Ecuador	21.25	q
4	Ramon Gittens	Barbados	21.29	q
5	Miklós Szebeny	Hungary	21.37	
6	Calvin Smith	United States	21.46	
7	Mateusz Pluta	Poland	21.50	
8	Rion Pierre	United Kingdom	21.54	

=== Heats ===
17 August

==== Heat 1 ====
Wind: -0.2 m/s

Rank	Name	Nationality	Time	Notes
1	Willie Perry	United States	21.11	Q
2	Per Strandquist	Sweden	21.26	Q
3	Arnout Matthys	Belgium	21.36	q
4	Ramis Abdulkaderov	Russia	21.76	
5	Marc Altés	Spain	21.92	
6	Nicolás Piorno	Argentina	22.13	
	Abdullah Al-Souli	Oman	DQ	

==== Heat 2 ====
Wind: -1.1 m/s

Rank	Name	Nationality	Time	Notes
1	Kurt Mulcahy	Australia	21.26	Q
2	Matteo Galvan	Italy	21.33	Q
3	Igor Bodrov	Ukraine	21.36	q
4	Chen Yibo	China	21.71	
5	Nyls Nubret	France	21.92	
6	Leung Ki Ho	Hong Kong	22.13	
7	Daryl Vassallo	Gibraltar	22.24	

==== Heat 3 ====
Wind: -0.4 m/s

Rank	Name	Nationality	Time	Notes
1	Franklin Nazareno	Ecuador	21.21	Q
2	Marek Niit	Estonia	21.24	Q
3	Kemar Hyman	Cayman Islands	21.41	q
4	Yusuke Ishitsuka	Japan	21.42	q
5	Gabriel Mvumvure	Zimbabwe	22.08	
6	Yutthapong Muadmueng	Thailand	22.33	
	Aaron Vanderent	Australia	DNF	

==== Heat 4 ====
Wind: -1.5 m/s

Rank	Name	Nationality	Time	Notes
1	Ramon Gittens	Barbados	21.26	Q
2	Miklós Szebeny	Hungary	21.48	Q
3	Rion Pierre	United Kingdom	21.51	q
4	Reto Schenkel	Switzerland	21.65	
5	Yi Wei-Chen	Chinese Taipei	21.75	
6	Javier Sanz	Spain	21.87	
7	Christopher Kenty	Palau	24.43	

==== Heat 5 ====
Wind: -0.6 m/s

Rank	Name	Nationality	Time	Notes
1	Bryan Barnett	Canada	21.07	Q
2	Calvin Smith	United States	21.51	Q
3	Kagisho Kumbane	South Africa	21.71	
4	Elvijs Misāns	Latvia	22.05	
5	Kervin Morgan	Trinidad and Tobago	22.21	
6	Reagan Ngoshi	Namibia	22.39	
	Hassan Thabit	Yemen	DQ	

==== Heat 6 ====
Wind: 0.0 m/s

Rank	Name	Nationality	Time	Notes
1	Alex Nelson	United Kingdom	21.15	Q
2	Mateusz Pluta	Poland	21.30	Q
3	Zhang Peimeng	China	21.58	q
4	Giuseppe Aita	Italy	21.58	
5	Mitsuhiro Abiko	Japan	21.79	
6	Ahmed Bongo	Mauritius	21.93	
7	Serge Tcheuko	Cameroon	22.56	
	Tshegofatso Mputla	South Africa	DQ	

==== Heat 7 ====
Wind: -0.8 m/s

Rank	Name	Nationality	Time	Notes
1	Jerrel Feller	Netherlands	21.21	Q
2	Julian Reus	Germany	21.39	Q
3	Matija Čop	Croatia	21.51	q
4	Katim Touré	Senegal	21.66	
5	Simon Johansson	Sweden	21.75	
6	Alexandre Adalbert	France	21.96	
7	Withley Williams	Saint Kitts and Nevis	22.62	
	Richard Richardson	Antigua and Barbuda	DQ	

==== Heat 8 ====
Wind: -0.6 m/s

Rank	Name	Nationality	Time	Notes
1	Dmitriy Ostrovsky	Ukraine	21.00	Q
2	Visa Hongisto	Finland	21.51	Q
3	Nils Müller	Germany	21.57	q
4	Nedim Covic	Bosnia and Herzegovina	21.67	
5	Tristan Taylor	Jamaica	21.86	
6	Tyrell Cuffy	Cayman Islands	21.96	
7	Pavel Setin	Azerbaijan	22.31	
8	Keston Bledman	Trinidad and Tobago	25.57	

== Participation ==
According to an unofficial count, 59 athletes from 45 countries participated in the event.

- Antigua and Barbuda (1)
- Argentina (1)
- Australia (2)
- Azerbaijan (1)
- Barbados (1)
- Belgium (1)
- Bosnia and Herzegovina (1)
- Cameroon (1)
- Canada (1)
- Cayman Islands (2)
- China (2)
- Chinese Taipei (1)
- Croatia (1)
- Ecuador (1)
- Estonia (1)
- Finland (1)
- France (2)
- Germany (2)
- Gibraltar (1)
- Hong Kong (1)
- Hungary (1)
- Italy (2)
- Jamaica (1)
- Japan (2)
- Latvia (1)
- Mauritius (1)
- Namibia (1)
- Netherlands (1)
- Oman (1)
- Palau (1)
- Poland (1)
- Russia (1)
- Saint Kitts and Nevis (1)
- Senegal (1)
- South Africa (2)
- Spain (2)
- Sweden (2)
- Switzerland (1)
- Thailand (1)
- Trinidad and Tobago (2)
- Ukraine (2)
- United Kingdom (2)
- United States (2)
- Yemen (1)
- Zimbabwe (1)
