= 2010 African Championships in Athletics – Men's 100 metres =

The men's 100 metres at the 2010 African Championships in Athletics were held on July 28–29.

== Medalists ==
Gold	Silver	Bronze
Ben Youssef Meité; Ivory Coast	Aziz Zakari; Ghana	Simon Magakwe; South Africa

== Results ==
=== Heats ===
Qualification: First 3 of each heat (Q) and the next 3 fastest (q) qualified for the semifinals.

Rank	Heat	Name	Nationality	Time	Notes
1	7	Obinna Metu	Nigeria	10.37	Q
2	1	Ben Youssef Meité	Ivory Coast	10.38	Q
3	7	Amr Ibrahi Mostafa Seoud	Egypt	10.39	Q
4	6	Suwaibou Sanneh	Gambia	10.43	Q, SB
5	5	Ogho-Oghene Egwero	Nigeria	10.47	Q
6	5	Gérard Kobéané	Burkina Faso	10.48	Q
7	6	Aziz Zakari	Ghana	10.48	Q
8	4	Aziz Ouhadi	Morocco	10.49	Q
9	6	Benjamin Adukwu	Nigeria	10.54	Q
10	6	Hannes Dreyer	South Africa	10.55	q
11	5	Mouhamadou Lamine Niang	Senegal	10.57	Q
12	4	Fabrice Coiffic	Mauritius	10.59	Q
13	7	Wilfried Koffi Hua	Ivory Coast	10.59	Q
14	6	Pierre Paul Bisseck	Cameroon	10.62	q
15	7	Innocent Bologo	Burkina Faso	10.63	q
16	1	Ibrahim Kabia	Sierra Leone	10.63	Q
17	2	Kipkemoi Soy	Kenya	10.64	Q, SB
18	2	Simon Magakwe	South Africa	10.66	Q
19	1	Moussa Sissoko	Mali	10.67	Q
20	7	Delivert Kimbembe	Republic of the Congo	10.69	
21	4	Hitjivirue Kaanjuka	Namibia	10.70	Q
22	1	Allah Laryca-Arrong	Ghana	10.71	
23	3	Godwin Hukporti	Ghana	10.73	Q
24	1	Lehata Mosito	Lesotho	10.77	
25	7	Stephen Barasa	Kenya	10.80	
26	4	Simon Kimaru	Kenya	10.81	SB
27	2	Jesse Urikhob	Namibia	10.84	Q
28	5	Ahmed Ondimba Bongo	Mauritius	10.85	
29	2	Idrissa Adam	Cameroon	10.86	
30	3	Richard Chitambi	Zambia	10.88	Q
31	4	Danny D'Souza	Seychelles	10.93	
32	4	Titus Kafunda	Zambia	10.95	
33	1	Abyot Lencho	Ethiopia	10.96	
34	6	Geoffrey Akena	Uganda	11.02	
35	1	Ghyd Olonghot	Republic of the Congo	11.03	
36	7	Jack Ngumbi	Zambia	11.04	
37	3	Lazarous Inya	Uganda	11.05	Q
38	3	Gogbeu Francis Kone	Ivory Coast	11.09	
39	6	Mervin Loiseau	Seychelles	11.09	
40	4	Tezera Chamia	Ethiopia	11.10	
41	5	Martin Achila	Uganda	11.11	
42	3	Musa Mlekwa	Tanzania	11.13	
43	2	Yannick Vidot	Seychelles	11.22	
44	4	Lista Matonya	Tanzania	11.30	
45	1	Muhidini Yasini	Tanzania	11.35	
46	7	Dylan Rensburg	Zimbabwe	11.55	
47	5	Emmanuel Havugimana	Rwanda	11.58	
48	3	Wetere Galcha	Ethiopia	12.88	
	3	Haita Bonyatala	Democratic Republic of the Congo	DNF	
	2	Mhadjou Youssouf	Comoros	DNF	
	2	Prince Yangou Kpiangui	Central African Republic	DNS	
	2	Felix Mwango	Malawi	DNS	
	3	Abdouraim Haroun	Chad	DNS	
	5	Wilfried Bingangoye	Gabon	DNS	
	6	Henrico Louis	Mauritius	DNS	
	5	Abraham Morlu	Liberia	DNS	

=== Semifinals ===
Qualification: First 2 of each semifinal (Q) and the next 2 fastest (q) qualified for the final.

Rank	Heat	Name	Nationality	Time	Notes
1	3	Aziz Zakari	Ghana	10.16	Q, SB
2	3	Ogho-Oghene Egwero	Nigeria	10.17	Q
3	1	Ben Youssef Meité	Ivory Coast	10.22	Q
4	2	Simon Magakwe	South Africa	10.24	Q, SB
5	1	Amr Ibrahi Mostafa Seoud	Egypt	10.26	Q
6	1	Aziz Ouhadi	Morocco	10.28	q
7	2	Obinna Metu	Nigeria	10.30	Q
8	3	Mouhamadou Lamine Niang	Senegal	10.42	q
9	2	Kipkemoi Soy	Kenya	10.44	PB
10	1	Moussa Sissoko	Mali	10.45	SB
11	3	Gérard Kobéané	Burkina Faso	10.45	SB
12	2	Innocent Bologo	Burkina Faso	10.48	
13	3	Hannes Dreyer	South Africa	10.49	
14	3	Suwaibou Sanneh	Gambia	10.50	
15	1	Fabrice Coiffic	Mauritius	10.51	SB
16	1	Benjamin Adukwu	Nigeria	10.53	
17	2	Hitjivirue Kaanjuka	Namibia	10.54	
18	2	Ibrahim Kabia	Sierra Leone	10.58	
19	2	Wilfried Koffi Hua	Ivory Coast	10.60	
20	1	Pierre Paul Bisseck	Cameroon	10.67	
21	2	Godwin Hukporti	Ghana	10.76	
22	1	Jesse Urikhob	Namibia	10.78	
23	3	Richard Chitambi	Zambia	10.95	
24	3	Lazarous Inya	Uganda	11.14	

=== Final ===
Wind: +1.90 m/s

Rank	Lane	Name	Nationality	Time	Notes
1st place, gold medalist(s)	5	Ben Youssef Meité	Ivory Coast	10.08	PB
2nd place, silver medalist(s)	3	Aziz Zakari	Ghana	10.12	SB
3rd place, bronze medalist(s)	4	Simon Magakwe	South Africa	10.14	SB
4	7	Amr Ibrahi Mostafa Seoud	Egypt	10.18	NR
5	6	Ogho-Oghene Egwero	Nigeria	10.26	
6	1	Aziz Ouhadi	Morocco	10.26	SB
7	8	Obinna Metu	Nigeria	10.31	
8	2	Mouhamadou Lamine Niang	Senegal	10.40	
