= 2010 IAAF World Indoor Championships – Men's 60 metres =

The men's 60 metres at the 2010 IAAF World Indoor Championships was held at the ASPIRE Dome on 12 and 13 March.

Coming into the championships, Ivory Williams had run a world-leading time of 6.49 seconds to win the US indoor championships, positioning him as a possible gold medallist. However, he tested positive for marijuana and he received a three-month ban, while his world-leading performance was annulled. This made Dwain Chambers the competitor with the best pre-championships form, closely followed by Mike Rodgers, Nesta Carter and Daniel Bailey.

Chambers led the field on the first day heats, followed by Trell Kimmons and the home athlete Samuel Francis (athlete). Little-known Ryan Moseley upset the favourites in the sixth heat in which Lerone Clarke of Jamaica was eliminated. Clarke was the only surprise non-qualifier of the round, although Rolf Fongué was the first athlete to fall foul of the no false start rule at a global championships – a rule introduced at the start of the 2010 season. On the second day of competition, Chambers (6.51) and Kimmons (6.55)were again the fastest qualifiers in the semi-finals, with Mike Rodgers and Daniel Bailey improving as the rounds progressed. Nesta Carter and Ronald Pognon were the other semifinal leaders, while Francis progressed as a fastest-loser. Ibrahim Kabia and Rodney Green both ran national record times of 6.65 as did 2008 Olympic fourth placer Churandy Martina. However, only Kabia won selection for the final eight. Harry Aikines-Aryeetey, one of the fastest of the season, pulled up with an injury.

In the last day round of the competition, Rodgers and Bailey made quick starts to lead the final. However, Chambers hit his top speed to pull ahead of his rivals and leant at the line for the victory. The final saw a number of career firsts for athletes: Chambers won the race in 6.48 seconds (a world-leading time) to become the oldest ever winner of the event at 31, which was also his first ever world title after winning silver in 2008. Mike Rodgers was the next athlete home and his silver was his first ever medal on a global stage. Daniel Bailey had become the first ever Antiguan to reach a world indoor final, and he duly improved upon the feat to take the bronze to become the island nation's first ever medallist. Trell Kimmons, who was only a last minute replacement for Ivory Williams, took fourth place.

== Medalists ==
Gold	Silver	Bronze
Dwain Chambers; Great Britain	Mike Rodgers; United States	Daniel Bailey; Antigua and Barbuda

== Records ==
Standing records prior to the 2010 IAAF World Indoor Championships
World record	Maurice Greene (USA)	6.39	Madrid, Spain	3 February 1998
World record	Maurice Greene (USA)	6.39	Atlanta, United States	3 March 2001
Championship record	Maurice Greene (USA)	6.42	Maebashi, Japan	7 March 1999
World Leading	Dwain Chambers (GBR)	6.50	Sheffield, United Kingdom	13 February 2010
African record	Leonard Myles-Mills (GHA)	6.45	Colorado Springs, United States	20 February 1999
Asian record	Talal Mansour (QAT)	6.51	Karlsruhe, Germany	6 March 1993
European record	Dwain Chambers (GBR)	6.42	Turin, Italy	7 March 2009
North and Central American and Caribbean record	Maurice Greene (USA)	6.39	Madrid, Spain	3 February 1998
North and Central American and Caribbean record	Maurice Greene (USA)	6.39	Atlanta, United States	3 March 2001
Oceanian record	Matt Shirvington (AUS)	6.52	Maebashi, Japan	7 March 1999
South American record	José Carlos Moreira (BRA)	6.52	Paris, France	13 February 2009

== Qualification standards ==
Indoor	Outdoor
6.69	10.20 (100 m)

== Schedule ==
Date	Time	Round
March 12, 2010	15:00	Heats
March 13, 2010	16:20	Semifinals
March 13, 2010	18:50	Final

== Results ==
=== Heats ===
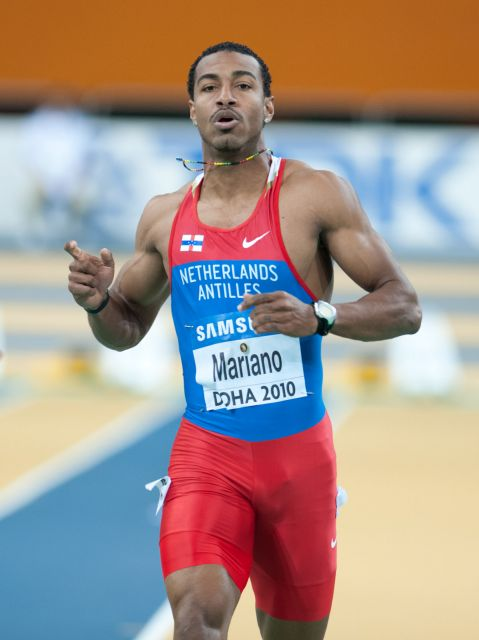
Brian Mariano of the Netherlands Antilles was the fourth-fastest on day one.

Qualification: First 3 in each heat (Q) and the next 3 fastest (q) advance to the semifinals.

Rank	Heat	Name	Nationality	Time	Notes
1	2	Dwain Chambers	Great Britain	6.59	Q
2	1	Trell Kimmons	United States	6.61	Q
DQ	1	Samuel Francis	Qatar	~~6.63~~	Q, Doping
3	3	Brian Mariano	Netherlands Antilles	6.66	Q
4	5	Ángel David Rodríguez	Spain	6.67	Q
5	1	Abraham Morlu	Liberia	6.68	Q
6	3	Barakat Mubarak Al-Harthi	Oman	6.69	Q
7	4	Mike Rodgers	United States	6.69	Q
8	5	Nesta Carter	Jamaica	6.69	Q
9	7	Daniel Bailey	Antigua and Barbuda	6.70	Q
10	3	Harry Aikines-Aryeetey	Great Britain	6.72	Q
11	2	Ogho-Oghene Egwero	Nigeria	6.73	Q
12	4	Rodney Green	Bahamas	6.73	Q
13	4	Ronald Pognon	France	6.73	Q
14	5	Vicente de Lima	Brazil	6.75	Q, SB
15	1	Masashi Eriguchi	Japan	6.75	q, PB
16	3	Aleksandr Vashurkin	Russia	6.75	q
17	5	Roman Smirnov	Russia	6.75	q
18	2	Ibrahim Kabia	Sierra Leone	6.76	Q
19	6	Ryan Moseley	Austria	6.76	Q
20	4	Ben Youssef Meité	Ivory Coast	6.76	
21	6	Churandy Martina	Netherlands Antilles	6.77	Q
22	6	Pascal Mancini	Switzerland	6.77	Q
23	7	Reza Ghasemi	Iran	6.78	Q
24	7	Peter Emelieze	Nigeria	6.78	Q
25	6	Lerone Clarke	Jamaica	6.78	
26	4	Martin Krabbe	Denmark	6.79	
27	4	David Lescay	Cuba	6.79	PB
28	7	Iván Mocholí	Spain	6.79	
29	3	Yasser Al-Nashri	Saudi Arabia	6.83	SB
30	1	Teddy Tinmar	France	6.88	
31	2	Lai Chun Ho	Hong Kong	6.88	
32	1	Calvin Kang Li Loong	Singapore	6.91	PB
33	2	Ággelos Aggelákis	Greece	6.94	
34	3	Yi Wei-Chen	Chinese Taipei	6.96	PB
35	1	Danny D'Souza	Seychelles	6.97	NR
36	1	Jared Lewis	Saint Vincent and the Grenadines	7.06	SB
37	7	Holder da Silva	Guinea-Bissau	7.07	
38	6	Adrian Ferreira	Paraguay	7.26	SB
39	2	John Howard	Federated States of Micronesia	7.30	PB
40	6	Federico Gorrieri	San Marino	7.31	SB
41	5	Moses Kamut	Vanuatu	7.32	NR
42	4	Jack Iroga	Solomon Islands	7.35	PB
43	2	Moussa Camara	Guinea	7.39	PB
44	6	Sibusiso Matsenjwa	Swaziland	7.39	PB
45	3	Leon Mengloi	Palau	7.45	NR
46	7	George Pine	Kiribati	7.46	PB
47	5	Yacouba Mamane	Niger	7.50	PB
48	7	Tiraa Arere	Cook Islands	7.64	PB
49	6	Jalal Kassab	Palestine	7.65	NR
50	3	Quaski Itaia	Nauru	7.66	PB
	5	Rolf Fongué	Switzerland	DQ	FS
	5	Mohamed Faisal	Brunei	DNS	

=== Semifinals ===
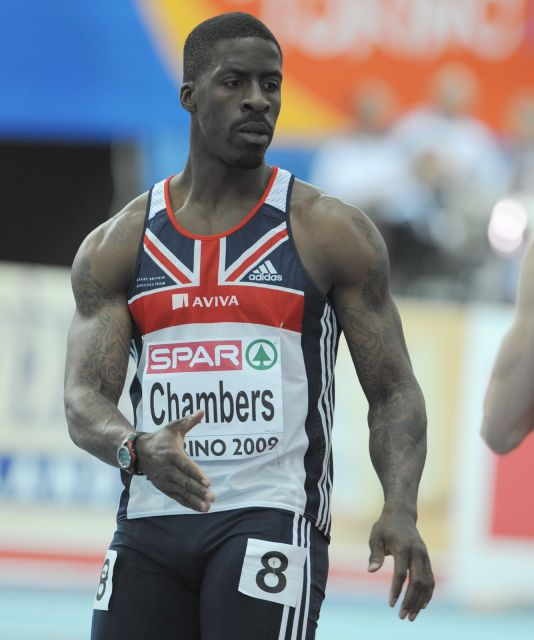
Dwain Chambers was the fastest qualifier on both occasions

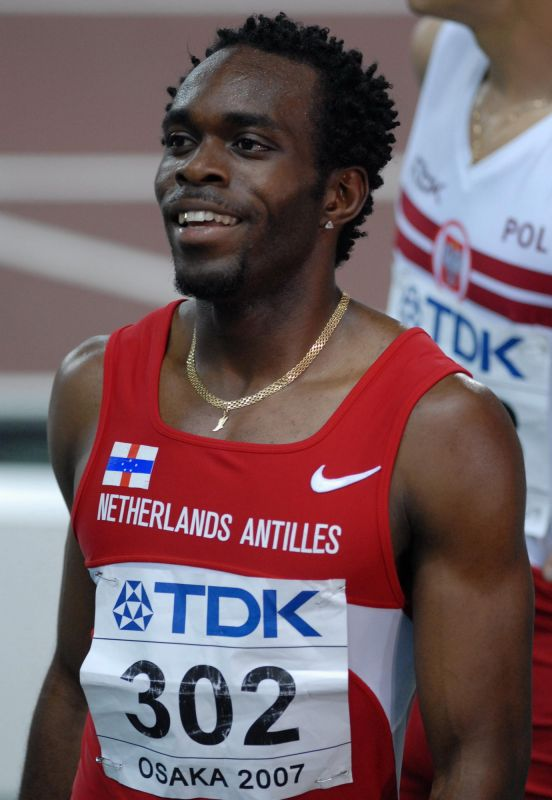
Churandy Martina was one of the more prominent casualties of the semi-finals.

Qualification: First 2 in each heat (Q) and the next 2 fastest (q) advance to the final.

Rank	Heat	Name	Nationality	Time	Notes
1	1	Dwain Chambers	Great Britain	6.51	Q
2	2	Trell Kimmons	United States	6.55	Q, SB
3	3	Mike Rodgers	United States	6.56	Q
4	2	Daniel Bailey	Antigua and Barbuda	6.62	Q
5	1	Nesta Carter	Jamaica	6.64	Q
6	3	Ronald Pognon	France	6.64	Q
DQ	2	Samuel Francis	Qatar	~~6.64~~	q, Doping
7	2	Ibrahim Kabia	Sierra Leone	6.65	q, NR
8	3	Churandy Martina	Netherlands Antilles	6.65	
9	3	Rodney Green	Bahamas	6.65	NR
10	1	Peter Emelieze	Nigeria	6.66	
11	1	Abraham Morlu	Liberia	6.67	NR
12	1	Barakat Mubarak Al-Harthi	Oman	6.67	NR
13	2	Ogho-Oghene Egwero	Nigeria	6.68	
14	3	Vicente de Lima	Brazil	6.69	SB
15	1	Ángel David Rodríguez	Spain	6.69	
16	2	Pascal Mancini	Switzerland	6.70	
17	3	Ryan Moseley	Austria	6.71	
18	3	Roman Smirnov	Russia	6.74	
19	1	Masashi Eriguchi	Japan	6.77	
20	2	Aleksandr Vashurkin	Russia	6.77	
21	1	Reza Ghasemi	Iran	6.80	
	2	Harry Aikines-Aryeetey	Great Britain	DNF	
	3	Brian Mariano	Netherlands Antilles	DQ	FS

=== Final ===
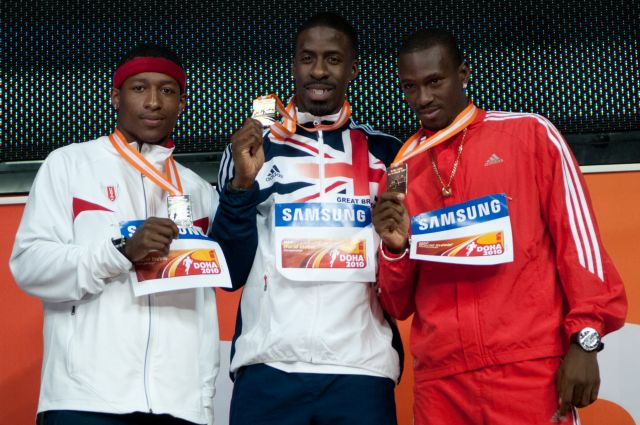
Rodgers, Chambers, and Bailey made up the 60 m podium in 2010

Rank	Name	Nationality	Time	Notes
1st place, gold medalist(s)	Dwain Chambers	Great Britain	6.48	WL
2nd place, silver medalist(s)	Mike Rodgers	United States	6.53	
3rd place, bronze medalist(s)	Daniel Bailey	Antigua and Barbuda	6.57	
4	Trell Kimmons	United States	6.59	
DQ	Samuel Francis	Qatar	~~6.62~~	Doping
6	Ronald Pognon	France	6.65	
7	Nesta Carter	Jamaica	6.72	
	Ibrahim Kabia	Sierra Leone	DNS	
