= Naohiro Shinada =

Japanese long jumper

Personal information
- Nationality: Japanese
- Born: 10 February 1986 (age 40) Sapporo, Japan
- Education: University of Tsukuba
- Height: 1.73 m (5 ft 8 in)
- Weight: 70 kg (150 lb)

Sport
- Country: Japan
- Sport: Track and field
- Event: Long jump

Achievements and titles
- Personal best(s): 100 m: 10.33 s (2005); Long jump: 7.93 m (2008)
Medal record
Men's athletics
Representing Japan
East Asian Games
Silver medal – second place	2009 Hong Kong	Long jump
World Junior Championships
Bronze medal – third place	2004 Grosseto	4×100 m relay
World Youth Championships
Gold medal – first place	2003 Sherbrooke	Long jump
Bronze medal – third place	2003 Sherbrooke	Medley relay

Naohiro Shinada (品田 直宏, Shinada Naohiro; born 10 February 1986 in Sapporo) is a Japanese long jumper. He is the 2003 World Youth Champion in the event.

He is currently the director of the track and field club at the International Pacific University.

== Personal bests ==
Event	Performance	Competition	Venue	Date	Notes
100 m	10.33 s	Six University Championships	Japan	2005	
100 m	10.30 s (wind: +3.4 m/s)	Kanto University Championships	Tokyo, Japan	13 May 2008	Wind-assisted
Long jump	7.93 m (wind: +1.2 m/s)	Japanese Championships	Kawasaki, Japan	28 June 2008	

== International competitions ==
Year	Competition	Venue	Position	Event	Performance
Representing Japan
2003	World Youth Championships	Sherbrooke, Canada	1st	Long jump	7.61 m (wind: -2.0 m/s)
2003	World Youth Championships	Sherbrooke, Canada	3rd	Medley relay	1:53.11 m (relay leg: 3rd) SB
2004	World Junior Championships	Grosseto, Italy	5th	Long jump	7.66 m (wind: +0.5 m/s) SB
2004	World Junior Championships	Grosseto, Italy	3rd	4×100 m relay	39.43 s (relay leg: 1st) SB
2007	Summer Universiade	Bangkok, Thailand	17th	Long jump	7.58 m (wind: +0.1 m/s)
2007	Summer Universiade	Bangkok, Thailand	5th	4×100 m relay	39.45 s (relay leg: 1st)
2009	East Asian Games	Hong Kong, China	2nd	Long jump	7.73 m (wind: +0.2 m/s)
