= Aleksandr Vashurkin =

Russian sprinter

Aleksandr Borisovich Vashurkin (Russian: Алекса́ндр Бори́сович Вашу́ркин; born 3 September 1986) is a Russian sprinter who specializes in the 100 metres.

He competed at the 2010 World Indoor Championships without reaching the final. His personal best time is 6.66 seconds in the 60 metres (indoor), achieved at the 2010 World Indoor Championships in Doha.
