= DécaNation =

DécaNation is an annual track and field meeting organized by the French Athletics Federation (Fédération Française d'Athlétisme) since 2005. The competition comprises national teams of athletes competing in a decathlon, with each athlete competing in their specialised event to score points for their respective countries. The first five editions took place at the Stade Charléty in Paris, but in 2010 it was held at Annecy, in 2011 at Nice and in 2012 it was at Albi. It is sponsored by SEAT and is referred to as the SEAT DecaNation.

== Format ==
- 100 metres
- 400 metres
- 100 metre hurdles / 110 metre hurdles
- 1500 metres
- long jump
- high jump
- pole vault
- shot put
- discus throw
- javelin throw

From 2009 edition on there were also competitions in non-classic events of the decathlon program.

- 800 metres
- 3000 metres steeplechase
- Hammer throw

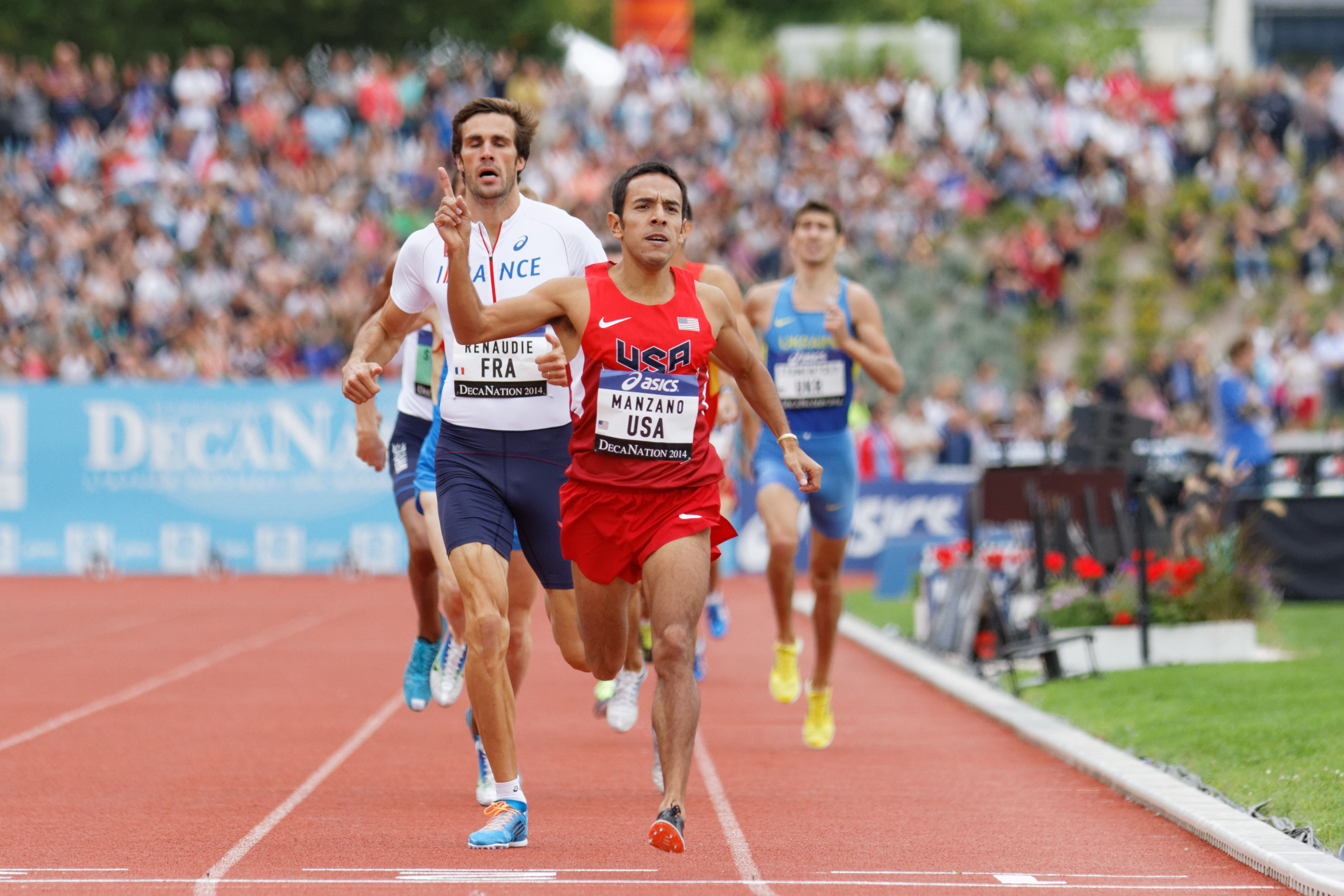
American Leonel Manzano winning the 800 metre event at the 2014 DécaNation

DécaNation is a competition for national teams, who battle it through the ten classic events of the decathlon program. There are 8 participating countries. Each country fields 20 athletes, 1 man and 1 woman per discipline. The concept is summarized in the promotional tagline L'Athlé Devient un Sport d'Equipe, that is, Athletics are Now a Team Sport.

== Venue ==
The contest is held at the Stade Sébastien Charléty, a 20,000 seater built on the site of the original Charléty. It was dedicated in 1994, when it hosted the IAAF Grand Prix Final (now the IAAF World Athletics Final). The Grand Prix Final returned to Charléty in 2002. For many years, the site was also home to the Meeting Gaz de France, which became the French leg of the IAAF Golden League in 1999, relocating to the recently opened Stade de France in the process.

== Past results ==
=== 2017 ===
DecaNation 2017
Rank	Team	Points
1	United States	122
2	France	103
3	Poland	95
4	Japan	80
5	Balkans	76
6	Ukraine	65
7	China	25

=== 2016 ===
DecaNation 2016
Rank	Team	Points
1	France	115
2	NACAC	109
3	Ukraine	102
4	Japan	92
5	China	68
6	DecaClubs	64

=== 2015 ===
DecaNation 2015
Rank	Team	Points
1	United States	131,5
2	Russia	120,5
3	France	86
4	Ukraine	72
5	China	59
6	Japan	52,5
7	Italy	51,5

=== 2014 ===
DecaNation 2014
Rank	Team	Points
1	United States	114
2	France	112
3	Russia	108
4	Ukraine	81
5	Balkans	67
6	Japan	48
7	China	47

=== 2013 ===
DecaNation 2013
Rank	Team	Points
1	United States	137
2	Russia	121
3	France	118
4	Germany	104
5	BALKANS	87
6	Ukraine	72
7	NORDIC	54
8	Italy	46

=== 2012 ===
DecaNation 2012
Rank	Team	Points
1	United States	66
2	Russia	56
3	Germany	39
4	France	38

=== 2011 ===
DecaNation 2011
Rank	Team	Points
1	United States	133.5
2	Russia	129
3	Germany	115
4	France	109
5	China	68
6	Spain	66.5
7	South Africa	66
8	United Kingdom	33

=== 2010 ===
DecaNation 2010
Rank	Team	Points
1	United States	133
2	Russia	94
3	Germany	91
4	France	88
5	Italy	70
6	Finland	51
7	China	46

=== 2009 ===
DecaNation 2009
Rank	Team	Points
1	United States	136
2	Germany	105
3	France	91
4	Russia	83
5	Italy	59
6	Spain	54
7	Finland	51

2009 event winners
	Men			Women		
Event	Winner	Nation	Performance	Winner	Nation	Performance
100 m	Michael Rodgers	United States	10.10 s	Verena Sailer	Germany	11.22 s
400 m	Angelo Taylor	United States	45.68 s	Monica Hargrove	United States	51.59 s
800 m	Nick Symmonds	United States	1 min 48.68 s	Maggie Vessey	United States	2 min 2.73 s
1500 m	Will Leer	United States	3 min 48.65 s	Erin Donohue	United States	4 min 10.62 s
110 / 100 m hurdles	Joel Brown	United States	13.35 s	Damu Cherry	United States	12.85 s
3000 m steeple	Dan Huling	United States	8 min 47.14 s	Sophie Duarte	France	9 min 43.51 s
Pole vault	Derek Miles	United States	5.70 m	Tatyana Polnova	Russia	4.55 m
Long jump	Christian Reif	Germany	8.18 m	Hyleas Fountain	United States	6.80 m
Shot put	Dan Taylor	United States	20.68 m	Nadine Kleinert	Germany	18.92 m
Discus	Robert Harting	Germany	66.91 m	Mélina Robert-Michon	France	63.04 m

=== 2008 ===
DecaNation 2008
Rank	Team	Points
1	United States	89.5
2	Germany	85
3	France	84
4	Russia	65
5	Ukraine	60.5
6	Spain	53

=== 2007 ===
DecaNation 2007
Rank	Team	Points
1	France	104
2	Germany	102
3	United States	100
4	Russia	88
5	Ukraine	63
5	Spain	62
7	Italy	59
8	Poland	DNP

=== 2006 ===
DecaNation 2006
Rank	Team	Points
1	United States	104.5
2	Germany	100
3	Poland	90.5
4	France	88
5	Ukraine	70
5	Russia	70
7	Spain	54
8	China	DNP

=== 2005 ===
DecaNation 2005
Rank	Team	Points
1	Russia	127
2	France	120
3	Poland	110
4	United States	103
5	United Kingdom	82.5
6	Spain	82
7	Italy	75.5
8	China	35
