= Remaldo Rose =

Jamaican sprinter (born 1987)

Personal information
- Born: 18 November 1987 (age 38) Saint Mary, Jamaica

Sport
- Sport: Track and field

Achievements and titles
- Personal best(s): 100m: 10.20 s (Kingston 2011); 200m: 20.91 s (Kingston 2006)
Medal record
Men's athletics
Representing Jamaica
Commonwealth Games
Silver medal – second place	2010 Delhi	4×100 m relay
World Junior Championships
Gold medal – first place	2006 Beijing	4×100 m relay
Silver medal – second place	2004 Grosseto	4×100 m relay
Bronze medal – third place	2004 Grosseto	100 m
CARIFTA Games Junior (U20)
Gold medal – first place	2004 Hamilton	4×100 m relay
Gold medal – first place	2006 Les Abymes	100 m
Gold medal – first place	2006 Les Abymes	4×100 m relay
Silver medal – second place	2004 Hamilton	100 m
CARIFTA Games Youth (U17)
Gold medal – first place	2003 Port of Spain	100 m
Gold medal – first place	2003 Port of Spain	4x100m relay

Remaldo Rose (born 18 November 1987) is a retired Jamaican sprinter who specialized in the 100 metres and 200 metres.

Rose went to Camperdown High School in September 2000, but was injured in his early years. His performances improved in 2003 and he broke the VMBS Boys and Girls Athletic Championship Class 2 100 m record three times consecutively in the heats, semis and final. He also took the Class 2 200 m title that year and went on to win the 100 m and 200 m Class 1 titles in his first year. He helped his team to many relay victories, including the 4 × 400 m relay which the school had not entered for a number of years. The Camperdown team also won at the Penn Relays, and he was selected for the junior international relay team.

At the 2004 World Junior Championships in Athletics he won the bronze medal in the 100 m and anchored the junior relay team to the silver medal behind the United States. He returned at the 2006 World Junior Championships in Athletics and (along with Yohan Blake) helped the 4×100 m relay team to the world junior gold medal. He was beaten the 100 m bronze medal by Blake, having finished in fourth place. He won the 100 m title at the 2006 CARIFTA Games.

Injuries abruptly interrupted his career at that point and it was not until 2010 that he was able to assert himself within the senior ranks. He ran at the Amsterdam Open meeting in August and was selected as a relay runner for Jamaica at the 2010 Commonwealth Games. He achieved a personal best of 10.20 seconds for the 100 m in 2011, but again suffered injuries.

Due to recurring injuries, Rose decided to stop competing and in 2012 he became a member of the coaching staff at Racers Track Club, the group containing Olympic and world champions Usain Bolt, Yohan Blake and Warren Weir. Turning away from his injury-ridden senior career, he instead set his sights on sharing his track and field knowledge with younger athletes.

== Achievements ==
Year	Competition	Venue	Position	Event	Notes
Representing Jamaica
2003	CARIFTA Games (U-17)	Port of Spain, Trinidad and Tobago	1st	100 m	10.65 (1.3 m/s)
2003	CARIFTA Games (U-17)	Port of Spain, Trinidad and Tobago	1st	4 × 100 m relay	41.77
2004	CARIFTA Games (U-20)	Hamilton, Bermuda	2nd	100 m	10.58 (-0.9 m/s)
2004	CARIFTA Games (U-20)	Hamilton, Bermuda	1st	4 × 100 m relay	39.48
2004	World Junior Championships	Grosseto, Italy	3rd	100 m	10.34 (1.0 m/s)
2004	World Junior Championships	Grosseto, Italy	2nd	4 × 100 m relay	39.27
2006	CARIFTA Games (U-20)	Les Abymes, Guadeloupe	1st	100 m	10.48 (0.0 m/s)
2006	CARIFTA Games (U-20)	Les Abymes, Guadeloupe	1st	4 × 100 m relay	39.81
2006	World Junior Championships	Beijing, China	4th	100 m	10.43 (-0.5 m/s)
2006	World Junior Championships	Beijing, China	1st	4 × 100 m relay	39.05
