= Ivory Williams =

American sprinter (born 1985)

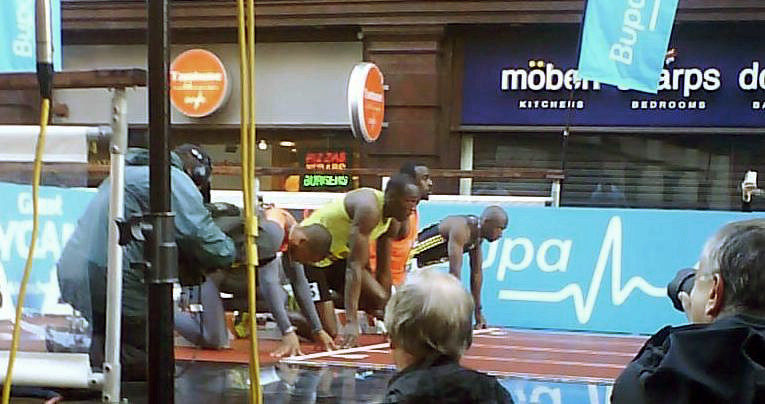
- Williams (in orange) in the starting blocks for the 150 meters street race. Usain Bolt (in yellow) set a world best of 14.35 seconds.

Personal information
- Nationality: American
- Born: May 2, 1985 (age 41) Beaumont, Texas, U.S.
- Height: 5 ft 8 in (173 cm)
- Weight: 170 lb (77 kg)

Sport
- Sport: Running

Achievements and titles
- Personal best(s): 100m: 9.93 200m: 20.62 400m: 46.25
Medal record
Men's athletics
Representing the United States
World Junior Championships
Gold medal – first place	2002 Kingston	4×100 m
Gold medal – first place	2004 Grosseto	100 m
Gold medal – first place	2004 Grosseto	4×100 m

Ivory Williams (born May 2, 1985) is an American sprint athlete who specializes in the 100 meters.

Born in Jefferson County, Texas, Williams attended Central High School in Beaumont, where he was a two-sport athlete. As a wide receiver and all-purpose back, he was ranked as the No. 40 football prospect in the state by Rivals.com. In track and field, he competed at the 2002 United States Junior Championships, taking bronze in the 200 meters and finishing in fourth place in the 100 m. In his senior season in 2003, Williams was unbeaten on the track. His first major junior tournament was the 2004 World Junior Championships in Athletics. He produced a season's best of 10.29 seconds to win the 100 m event, beating favourite Abidemi Omole. He followed this up with another gold medal in the 4×100 meters relay, setting a junior world record of 38.66 seconds with teammates Omole, Trell Kimmons, and LaShawn Merritt.

In the 2008 season he won the 100 m at the Prefontaine Classic. Shortly after, Williams broke the 10-second barrier for the first time, running a new 100 m personal best of 9.94 seconds in the quarter-finals of the 2008 US Olympic Trials. The time made him the fifth fastest American in the 100 m that year, and ninth in the world rankings. However, he failed to progress beyond the semi-finals: Williams was beaten into fifth place, and out of qualification, by Xavier Carter by just a thousandth of a second.

He ran a personal best of 6.52 seconds in the 60 meters at the 2009 USA Indoor Track and Field Championships, reaching the final as the fastest qualifier. However, he was disqualified in the final of the event for a false start. At the USA vs. The World relay competition at the Penn Relays, Williams took second place in 38.36 with the US red team comprising Terrence Trammell, Mark Jelks, and Mike Rodgers.

In May 2009, Williams took part in the 150 meters street race at the Great City Games in Manchester. He finished in third with a time of 15.08 seconds, behind Marlon Devonish and Usain Bolt (who ran a world best 14.35 seconds). He reached the final of the US Championships but finished seventh, missing out on the 2009 World Championships in Athletics. He recorded a new personal best the following month, running 9.93 seconds to win the 25th Vardinoyannia in Rethymno, Greece.

Williams won the 60 m at the USA Indoor Track and Field Championships in 2010, running a world leading and personal record time of 6.49 seconds, which set him up as a favorite for the 2010 IAAF World Indoor Championships. However, he was barred from competing at the championships after his sample from the US championships tested positive for Carboxy THC, a marijuana metabolite. He received a three-month suspension and his championship result was annulled.

== Personal bests ==
Event	Time (seconds)	Venue	Date
60 meters	6.51	Boston, Massachusetts, United States	February 6, 2010
100 meters	9.93	Rethymno, Greece	July 20, 2009
200 meters	20.62	Houston, Texas, United States	May 6, 2006
400 meters	46.25	Wichita, Kansas, United States	April 16, 2005

- All information taken from IAAF Profile.
