= Emmanuel Havugimana =

Rwandan politician

Senator of West Province, Rwanda
- Incumbent
- Assumed office September 10, 2019

Personal details
- Born: 4 January 1956 (age 70) Nyamagabe District
- Party: Rwanda Patriotic Front
- Spouse: Jacqueline Uwimana (since 1988)
- Education: University of Gothenburg (PhD in Human Ecology); Laval University (Masters of Arts in Land Use and Regional Development); University of Burundi (Bachelor of Sciences in Geography)
- Occupation: Lecturer, politician, academic administrator
- Known for: Public Administration, leadership, academic administration, Politics

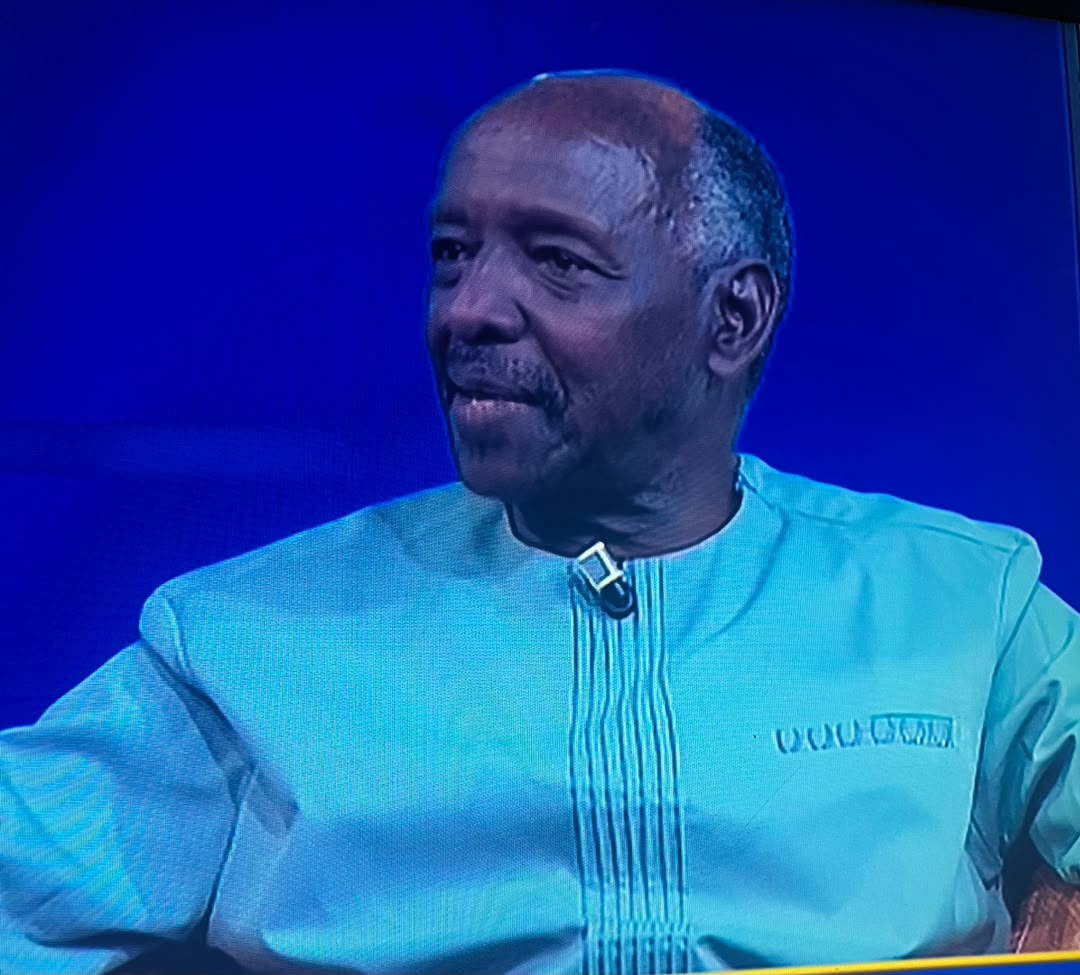
Senitor Havugimana Emmanuel

Emmanuel Havugimana is a Rwandan politician who is the Senator of Western province in Rwanda since September 2019. He is a member of Rwanda Patriotic Front political party. Formerly he served as a lecturer of geography at University of Rwanda.

== Early life and education background ==
Havugimana was born on 4 January 1956 in Nyamagabe District. He attended Mbazi Catholic Primary School (1962–1968), Birambo College School for O`level (1968–1971), Nyamasheke Teachers Training School (1971–1973), St Albert College Bujumbura (1978–1980). He graduated with a Bachelor of Sciences in Geography from University of Burundi in 1984, a Master of Arts in Land Use and Regional Development from Laval University Quebec, Canada in 2001 and a PhD in Human Ecology from University of Gothenburg, Sweden in 2009.

== Career ==
Havugimana started as a teacher in 1974 teaching in Ruramba Protestant Primary School (1974–1976), Rugenge Protestant Primary School, Mushiha Refugees Settlement (1976–1978) (schools in Burundi) after he fled war in Rwanda in 1973. He also taught in various secondary schools in Burundi like Bukeye Teachers Training School (1984–1991), Lycee du Saint Esprit Bujumbura (1990–1991) and in 1991 he went to Djibouti where he taught at Tadjourah Secondary School, Dikhil Secondary School and Ali Sabieh Secondary School (1991–1996). From September 1996 to April 1997, Havugimana was In Charge of Information and Technology at Rwanda National Commission of UNESCO. In 1997 he joined University of Rwanda where he has served in various positions such as from April 1997 to October 1998 he served as an Administrative Assistant in Faculty of Psychology and Educational Sciences at National University of Rwanda, from October 1998 to September 1999, he was the Personal Assistant of the Vice Rector Academics at National University of Rwanda, Since September 2001 to September 2019 he served as a lecturer in Department of Geography and Urban Planning at National University of Rwanda. as an Academic Registrar (February 2010 to July 2011), Head of Department of Geography and Urban Planning (2012 to 2017). While as a lecturer Dr. Havugimana lectured Urban and Rural Planning Theory, Introduction to Research Methodology, Environment Planning and Analysis, Principles and Techniques of Land Use Planning, Tourism and Management, Resource Assessment and Land Use Planning, Regional Ecology and Land Degradation, Watershed Management and Forestry & Land Management courses.

He has served on various committees such as the President of Tumba Sector Council, Huye District (2011–2016), President of Board of Commissioners of CNLG (2016–2019), Member of Huye District Council, Ruhashya Sector Councilor (2016–2019), in September 2019, he was elected as a Senator representing the Western Province of Rwanda and in October 2019 he sworn in as the Senator for West Province. He represents Rwanda Senate in Inter-Parliamentary Union (IPU) and in The Forum of Parliaments of Member States of The International Conference on The Great Lakes Region (FP-ICGLR). On September 26, 2024 he was sworn in for a second and last five years term as Senator. He is member of Committee on Political Affairs and Governance.

== Other considerations ==
He has published the finding of his research on Land Use, Water, Forestry and Livelihoods in Geographical books and other peer publications journals hence cited with an H-Index of 7 with 321 citations in over 120 peer-reviewed journal in Geographical publications.

== Personal life ==
Havugimana is married to Jacqueline Uwimana since 1988, and together they have four children and four grandchildren. He is member of Rotary International since 2008. He has been a member of Disciplinary Committee in the senate from 2019 to 2020 He belongs to Rwanda Patriotic Front political party and a Roman Catholic by religion.
