= Mike Rodgers =

American sprinter (born 1985)

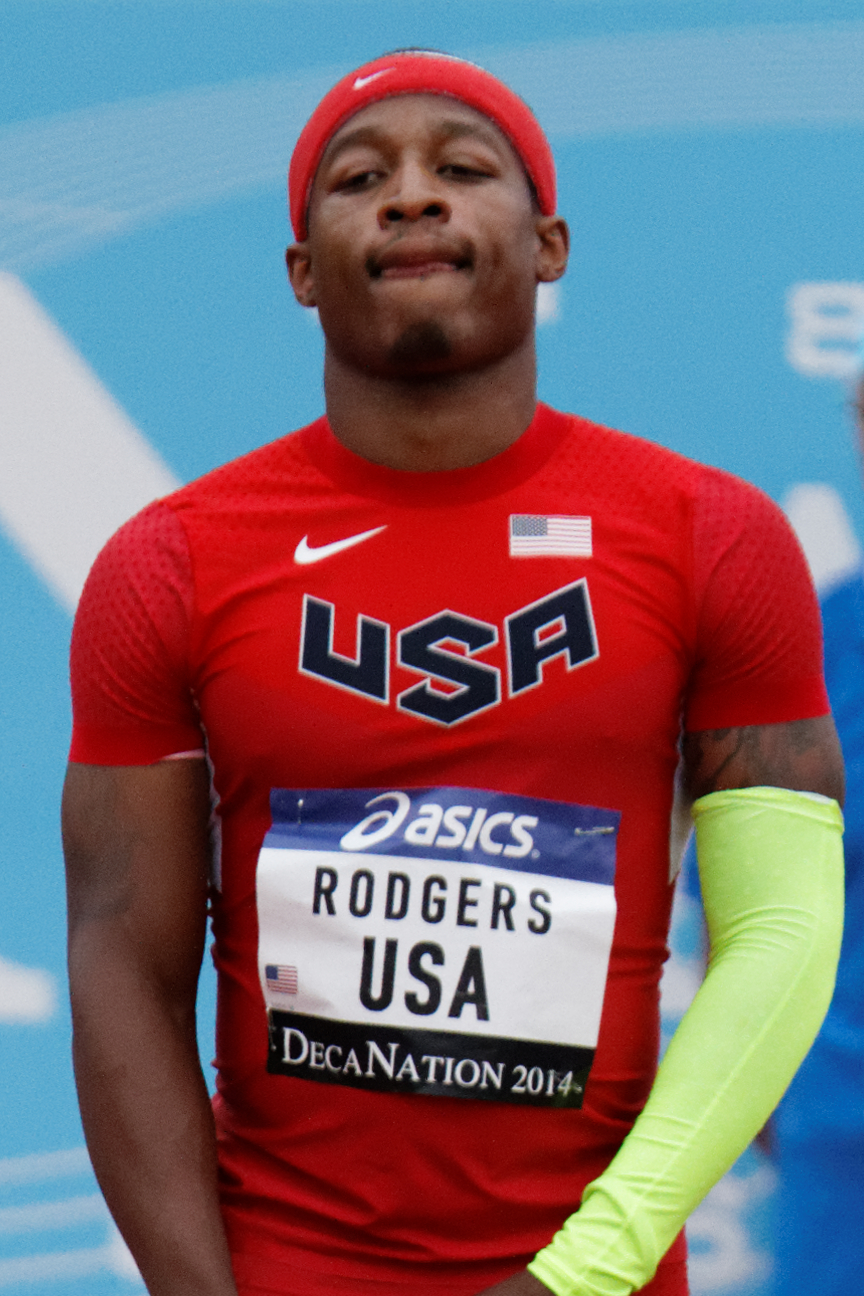
- Rodgers at the 2014 DécaNation

Personal information
- Full name: Michael Rodgers
- Born: April 24, 1985 (age 41) St. Louis, Missouri, U.S.
- Height: 5 ft 9 in (175 cm)
- Weight: 178 lb (81 kg)

Sport
- Country: United States
- Sport: Track and field
- Event: Sprinting
- College team: Oklahoma Baptist Bison; Lindenwood Lions
- Team: Nike
- Turned pro: 2007
- Coached by: Darryl Woodson

Achievements and titles
- Personal bests: 60 m: 6.48 (2011); 100 m: 9.85 (2011); 200 m: 20.24 (2009)
Medal record
Men's track and field
Representing the United States
World Championships
Gold medal – first place	2019 Doha	4 × 100 m relay
Silver medal – second place	2013 Moscow	4 × 100 m relay
Silver medal – second place	2017 London	4 × 100 m relay
World Indoor Championships
Silver medal – second place	2010 Doha	60 m
World Relays
Gold medal – first place	2015 Nassau	4 × 100 m relay
Gold medal – first place	2017 Nassau	4 × 100 m relay
Silver medal – second place	2019 Yokohama	4 × 100 m relay
World Indoor Tour
Winner	2016	60 m
Pan American Games
Gold medal – first place	2019 Lima	100 m
Bronze medal – third place	2019 Lima	4 × 100 m relay
Representing Americas
Continental Cup
Silver medal – second place	2014 Marrakesh	100 m
Gold medal – first place	2014 Marrakesh	4 × 100 m relay
Gold medal – first place	2018 Ostrava	4 × 100 m relay

Michael Rodgers (born April 24, 1985) is an American professional track and field sprinter who specializes in the 100 m and the 60 m. He won the gold medal in the 100 m relay in Doha 2019. He is also the Pan-Am Games Champion.

== Career ==
Rodgers attended Berkeley High School in St. Louis, Missouri, where he ran varsity track and played varsity basketball for the Bulldogs. Later attended Lindenwood University and Oklahoma Baptist University where he was a 10-time NAIA national champion from 2005 to 2007. Rodgers previously held the NAIA Indoor 60 m record with a 6.65.

In 60 meters, he became the 2008 US Indoor Champion and went on to finish fourth at the 2008 World Indoor Championships. In the 100 meters he finished sixth at the 2008 World Athletics Final.

The start of the 2009 outdoor season saw Rodgers improve his 100 and 200 meter personal bests: at the Grande Prêmio Brasil Caixa meet in May he recorded times of 10.01 and 20.24 seconds respectively. He further improved his 100 m best in June at the Prefontaine Classic, breaking the 10-second barrier for the first time with a world-leading performance of 9.94 seconds.

Rodgers qualified for his first World Championships in Athletics with a win at the 2009 US Championships in June. Of his first outdoor national victory he said: "This is my year. I came here with a lot of confidence. I think I can medal in Berlin if I work hard and stay humble." He reached the semi-finals at the 2009 World Championships, finishing fifth and just missing out on a place in the 100 m final. He closed the season with a fourth-place finish at the 2009 IAAF World Athletics Final.

The following year he turned to the 60 m at the 2010 IAAF World Indoor Championships and took the silver medal behind Dwain Chambers with a run of 6.53 seconds – his first medal on the global stage.

He improved up to running 9.85 at the Prefontaine classic 2011.

On July 19, 2011, he tested positive for a banned stimulant at a meeting in Italy. Rodgers claimed innocence, but accepted a provisional ban making him ineligible to participate at the World Championships in Daegu that year. He and his agent, Tony Campbell, initially claimed that Rodgers accidentally ingested the stimulant in an energy drink containing the stimulant at a club in Italy. He later accepted that he had taken a supplement called "Jack3d" which contained the stimulant methylhexanamine, a substance commonly found in nutritional supplements and energy drinks. In March 2012 he accepted a 9-month ban starting from the day his urine sample was taken, making him still eligible to participate at the USA Olympic Trials in Eugene that year.

== Statistics ==
- Information from World Athletics profile.

=== Personal bests ===
Event	Time	Wind (m/s)	Venue	Date	Notes
60 m	6.48 A	—N/a	Albuquerque, United States	February 27, 2011	Altitude-assisted, WL
100 m	9.85	+1.3	Eugene, United States	June 4, 2011	
100 m	9.80 w	+2.7	Eugene, United States	May 31, 2014	Wind-assisted
100 m	9.80 w	+2.4	Eugene, United States	June 27, 2014	Wind-assisted
200 m	20.24	0.0	Belém, Brazil	May 24, 2009	
4 × 100 m relay	37.10	—N/a	Doha, Qatar	October 5, 2019	WL, NR (Note: Shared with Christian Coleman, Justin Gatlin, and Noah Lyles for the USA.)

=== International championship results ===
Year	Competition	Venue	Position	Event	Time	Wind (m/s)	Notes
Representing the United States and the Americas (Continental Cup only)
2008	World Indoor Championships	Valencia, Spain	4th	60 m	6.57	—N/a	
2008	DécaNation	Paris, France	3rd	100 m	10.48	−0.5	
2009	World Championships	Berlin, Germany	9th	100 m	10.04	+0.2	
2009	World Championships	Berlin, Germany	DQ (semis)	4 × 100 m relay	—	—N/a	Passing out of zone
2009	DécaNation	Paris, France	1st	100 m	10.10	+0.8	
2010	World Indoor Championships	Doha, Qatar	2nd	60 m	6.53	—N/a	
2010	DécaNation	Annecy, France	1st	100 m	10.13	−0.8	
2013	World Championships	Moscow, Russia	2nd	4 × 100 m relay	37.66	—N/a	
2013	DécaNation	Valence, France	1st	100 m	10.21	−1.5	
2014	DécaNation	Angers, France	1st	100 m	10.14	+0.9	
2014	Continental Cup	Marrakesh, Morocco	2nd	100 m	10.04	−0.1	
2014	Continental Cup	Marrakesh, Morocco	1st	4 × 100 m relay	37.97	—N/a	SB
2015	World Relays	Nassau, Bahamas	1st	4 × 100 m relay	37.38	—N/a	CR, PB
2015	World Championships	Beijing, China	5th	100 m	9.94	−0.5	
2015	World Championships	Beijing, China	DQ	4 × 100 m relay	~~37.77~~	—N/a	Passing out of zone
2015	DécaNation	Paris, France	2nd	100 m	10.09	−0.6	
2016	World Indoor Championships	Portland, United States	6th	60 m	6.54	—N/a	
2016	Olympic Games	Rio de Janeiro, Brazil	DQ	4 × 100 m relay	—	—N/a	Passing out of zone
2017	World Relays	Nassau, Bahamas	1st	4 × 100 m relay	38.43	—N/a	
2017	World Championships	London, United Kingdom	2nd	4 × 100 m relay	37.52	—N/a	SB
2018	Continental Cup	Ostrava, Czech Republic	1st	4 × 100 m relay	38.05	—N/a	SB
2019	World Relays	Yokohama, Japan	2nd	4 × 100 m relay	38.07	—N/a	
2019	Pan American Games	Lima, Peru	1st	100 m	10.09	−0.5	
2019	Pan American Games	Lima, Peru	3rd	4 × 100 m relay	38.79	—N/a	
2019	World Championships	Doha, Qatar	9th	100 m	10.12	+0.8	
2019	World Championships	Doha, Qatar	1st	4 × 100 m relay	37.10	—N/a	WL, NR

=== Circuit wins ===
Outdoor

- Diamond League
  - Zürich Weltklasse: 2010 (4 × 100 m relay)
  - Monaco Herculis: 2012 (4 × 100 m relay), 2013 (4 × 100 m relay), 2015 (4 × 100 m relay)
  - Lausanne Athletissima: 2013 (100 m)
  - Paris Meeting Areva: 2014 (100 m)
- Other World Tour / World Challenge meets
  - Stockholm DN-galan: 2008 (4 × 100 m relay)
  - Belém Grande Prêmio Brasil Caixa de Atletismo: 2009 (100 m & 200 m), 2010 (100 m)
  - New York Reebok Grand Prix: 2009 (100 m)
  - Eugene Prefontaine Classic: 2009 (100 m)
  - Zhukovsky Znamensky Memorial: 2010 (100 m)
  - Tokyo Seiko Golden Grand Prix: 2013 (100 m)
  - Zagreb Hanžeković Memorial: 2013 (100 m), 2018 (100 m), 2019 (100 m)
  - Madrid Meeting de Atletismo: 2015 (100 m)
  - Nanjing World Challenge: 2019 (100 m)
  - Turku Paavo Nurmi Games: 2019 (100 m)

Indoor

- World Indoor Tour (60 m)
  - Overall winner: 2016
  - Karlsruhe Indoor Meeting: 2016
  - Boston New Balance Indoor Grand Prix: 2016
  - Madrid Indoor Meeting: 2018, 2019

=== National championship results ===
Year	Competition	Venue	Position	Event	Time	Wind (m/s)	Notes
Representing the Lindenwood Lions (2004–2005), Oklahoma Baptist Bison (2007), and Nike (2008–2011, 2013–2016, 2018–2019)
2004	U.S. Junior Championships	College Station, Texas	5th	100 m	10.37 w	+3.2	Wind-assisted
2004	U.S. Junior Championships	College Station, Texas	6th	200 m	21.40	0.0	
2005	U.S. Championships	Carson, California	18th	100 m	10.37	+1.0	
2006	U.S. Championships	Indianapolis, Indiana	22nd	100 m	10.41	+0.4	
2007	U.S. Indoor Championships	Boston, Massachusetts	11th	60 m	6.74	—N/a	
2007	U.S. Championships	Indianapolis, Indiana	14th	100 m	10.40	−1.4	
2008	U.S. Indoor Championships	Boston, Massachusetts	1st	60 m	6.54	—N/a	PB
2008	U.S. Olympic Trials	Eugene, Oregon	7th	100 m	10.01 w	+4.1	Wind-assisted
2009	U.S. Championships	Eugene, Oregon	1st	100 m	9.91 w	+3.1	Wind-assisted
2010	U.S. Indoor Championships	Albuquerque, New Mexico	1st	60 m	6.52 A	—N/a	Altitude-assisted, SB
2011	U.S. Indoor Championships	Albuquerque, New Mexico	1st	60 m	6.48 A	—N/a	Altitude-assisted, WL, PB
2011	U.S. Championships	Eugene, Oregon	3rd	100 m	9.99	+1.3	
2012	U.S. Olympic Trials	Eugene, Oregon	4th	100 m	9.94	+1.8	SB
2013	U.S. Championships	Des Moines, Iowa	3rd	100 m	9.98	+1.1	
2014	U.S. Indoor Championships	Albuquerque, New Mexico	1st (heats)	60 m	6.51 A	—N/a	Altitude-assisted, Q (Note: Did not start (DNS) in the semis.), SB
2014	U.S. Championships	Sacramento, California	1st	100 m	10.07	−1.7	
2015	U.S. Championships	Eugene, Oregon	3rd	100 m	9.97	0.0	
2016	U.S. Indoor Championships	Portland, Oregon	1st (heats)	60 m	6.56	—N/a	Q
2016	U.S. Olympic Trials	Eugene, Oregon	4th	100 m	10.00	+1.6	
2016	U.S. Olympic Trials	Eugene, Oregon	17th	200 m	20.94	−1.1	
2017	U.S. Championships	Sacramento, California	6th	100 m	10.17	−0.7	
2018	U.S. Indoor Championships	Albuquerque, New Mexico	3rd	60 m	6.50 A	—N/a	Altitude-assisted, SB
2018	U.S. Championships	Des Moines, Iowa	1st (heats)	100 m	9.89	+1.4	Q, WL, SB
2019	U.S. Championships	Des Moines, Iowa	2nd	100 m	10.12	−1.0	10.114 s
2021	U.S. Olympic Trials	Eugene, Oregon	15th	100 m	10.23	−0.3	

=== Seasonal bests ===
View chart definition.

Year	60 meters	100 meters
2003	6.89	10.81
2004	6.86	10.63
2005	6.71	10.30
2006	6.64	10.26
2007	6.65	10.10
2008	6.54	10.06
2009	6.51	9.94
2010	6.52	10.00
2011	6.48	9.85
2012	–	9.94
2013	6.53	9.90
2014	6.51	9.91
2015	6.52	9.86
2016	6.51	9.97
2017	6.62	10.00
2018	6.50	9.89
2019	6.54	9.97
2020	6.59	10.12
2021	6.52	10.00
2022	6.55	10.19
2023	6.66	10.41

=== Track records ===
As of 9 September 2024, Rodgers holds the following track records for 100 metres.

Location	Time	Windspeed m/s	Date	
Dubnica nad Váhom	9.90	+2.5	21/08/2013	
Glasgow	9.97	+0.3	11/07/2014	Track record shared with Nickel Ashmeade (JAM) from the same race.
Lima	10.09	–0.5	07/08/2019	
Nanjing	10.09	+0.2	21/05/2019	Track record shared with Andre De Grasse (CAN) from the same race.
Oxford, MS	9.96	+1.1	23/04/2011	
Plainview	10.07	0.0	21/04/2007	
Prague	9.92	+1.7	04/06/2018	
Sacramento	9.80	+2.4	27/06/2014	
Tomblaine	9.96	+ 2.4	08/07/2012	Track record shared with Kim Collins (SKN) from the same race.
Uberlândia	10.08	–1.0	20/05/2009	
