= Ibrahim Kabia =

Sierra Leonean sprinter

Ibrahim Kabia (born 28 July 1986) is a Sierra Leonean sprinter who specializes in the 100 metres. He attended the University of Minnesota in Minneapolis, MN. He ran for five years, redshirting his freshman year due to injury.

He was born in Freetown. He reached the semi-final in the 60 metres at the 2010 World Indoor Championships. He did qualify for the final, but did not start.

His personal best times are 6.63 seconds in the 60 metres (indoor), achieved in March 2007 in Fayetteville; 10.29 seconds in the 100 metres, achieved in May 2008 in Champaign; and 20.96 seconds in the 200 metres, achieved in June 2004 in Blaine.
