= Justyn Warner =

Canadian sprinter (born 1987)

Personal information
- Nationality: Canadian
- Born: June 28, 1987 (age 39) Toronto, Ontario
- Height: 5 ft 9 in (1.75 m)
- Weight: 175 lb (79 kg)

Sport
- Sport: Track and field
- Events: 100 metres, 200 metres
- College team: TCU Horned Frogs

Achievements and titles
- Personal bests: 60m: 6.57s (Birmingham 2015) 100m: 10.09s (London 2012) 200m: 20.95s (Toronto 2011)
Medal record
Men's Athletics
Representing Canada
World Championships
Bronze medal – third place	2013 Moscow	4×100 m relay
Bronze medal – third place	2015 Beijing	4×100 m relay
World Junior Championships
Silver medal – second place	2006 Beijing	100 m
Pan American Junior Championships
Silver medal – second place	2005 Windsor	100 m
Silver medal – second place	2005 Windsor	4×100 m relay

Justyn Warner, (born June 28, 1987) is a Canadian track athlete specializing in the 100 metres. He is the former Canadian Junior record holder at that distance with a time of 10.26. He anchored the Canadian 4 × 100 m relay team to a third-place finish at the 2012 Summer Olympics, but they were later disqualified for a teammate stepping out his lane. In 2013 he anchored Canada to a bronze in the same event at the 2013 World Championships in Athletics.

He was coached by Kevin Tyler.

== Career ==
Warner is a graduate of Birchmount Park Collegiate Institute in Scarborough, Ontario. He was a double-sport athlete playing football and running track, where he was an outstanding sprint athlete. In 2005, his senior year he won four provincial O.F.S.A.A titles on the track: 100m, 200m, 4 × 100 m, and 4 × 400 m.

On July 30, 2005, he finished second in the 100 m at the 2005 Pan Am Junior Games, held in Windsor, Ontario, in a time of 10.26, a new Canadian Junior record.

A year later on August 16, 2006, he claimed the silver medal in the 100 m at the 2006 World Junior Championships in Athletics, held in Beijing, China, in a time of 10.39.

Warner received a full scholarship to Texas Christian University where he competed in the NCAA as a Horned Frog under Darryl Anderson. He was a three-time All-American. He graduated TCU in 2009 with a bachelor's degree in kinesiology.

In 2012, Warner qualified in the 100m for the 2012 Summer Olympics by winning his first Canadian championship in 10.15s. That also qualified him to be a member of the 4 × 100 m relay team. At the Olympic Games, Warner finished 13th overall running a personal best of 10.09s twice in both the heat and the semi-final. Next up was the 4 × 100 m relay with Gavin Smellie, Oluseyi Smith, Jared Connaughton & Warner anchoring. In the final, the Canadian relay team arrived in third place and initially believed they had won bronze but they were disqualified when officials judged that Connaughton had stepped on the lane line just before passing the baton. The relay team from Trinidad and Tobago were awarded the bronze.

In August 2013 Warner anchored his Canadian teammates Gavin Smellie, Aaron Brown and Dontae Richards-Kwok to a bronze in the same men's sprint relay event at the 2013 World Championships in Athletics in Moscow, after Great Britain was disqualified for a baton exchange infraction.

== Personal life ==
Warner trains in Phoenix, Arizona. His hometown is Markham, Ontario, Canada.

Warner has a younger brother Ian who graduated from Iowa State University. His younger brother finished right behind him at the 2012 Canadian Olympic Trials with a time of 10.20.

Warner has a son, Kaedence, with Canadian hurdler Nikkita Holder.

== Statistics ==
=== Personal bests ===
Event	Best	Location	Date
60 metres	6.57s	Birmingham, UK	21 February 2015
100 metres	10.09s	London, England	4 August 2012
200 metres	20.95s	Toronto, ON Canada	13 June 2011
