= John Thornell (athlete) =

Australian long jumper

Personal information
- Nationality: Australian
- Born: 22 April 1985 (age 41)

Achievements and titles
- Personal best: 8.08 metres

John Thornell (born 22 April 1985) is an Australian long jumper.

He was born in Sydney. He finished eleventh at the 2001 World Youth Championships, sixth at the 2002 World Junior Championships, won the bronze medal at the 2004 World Junior Championships and finished fifth at the 2006 Commonwealth Games.

His personal best jump is 8.08 metres, achieved in January 2006 in Canberra.
