= Jacek Roszko =

Jacek Roszko and Kamil Kryński are sprinters running for KS Podlasie Białystok (KS stands for "Klub Sportowy" or "Sports' Club"), and are a part of the new wave of Polish sprinters who are chasing the dream of improving Marian Woronin's Polish national record over 100m of 10.00 s (9.998s) as well as the first European class sprinters from Podlasie.

- Born 1987-11-08
- Personal Best over 60m 6.64s (2009)
- Personal Best over 100m 10.39s (2007)
- Personal Best over 200m 22.02s (2007)
