= Anthony Alozie =

Australian track and field sprinter

Personal information
- Born: 18 August 1986 (age 40)
- Height: 1.71 m (5 ft 7 1/2 in)
- Weight: 79 kg (174 lb)

Sport
- Country: Australia
- Sport: Athletics
- Event: 4 × 100m relay

Anthony Alozie (born 18 August 1986 in Aba, Abia, Nigeria) is an Australian track and field sprinter. He was a member of the Australian 4 × 100 m relay team that equalled the Australian record when they qualified for the finals at the 2012 London Olympics.

== Doping case ==
Alozie was in 2014 handed a 20-month suspension after whereabouts breaches and for missing a drug test.
