= Trell Kimmons =

American sprinter (born 1985)

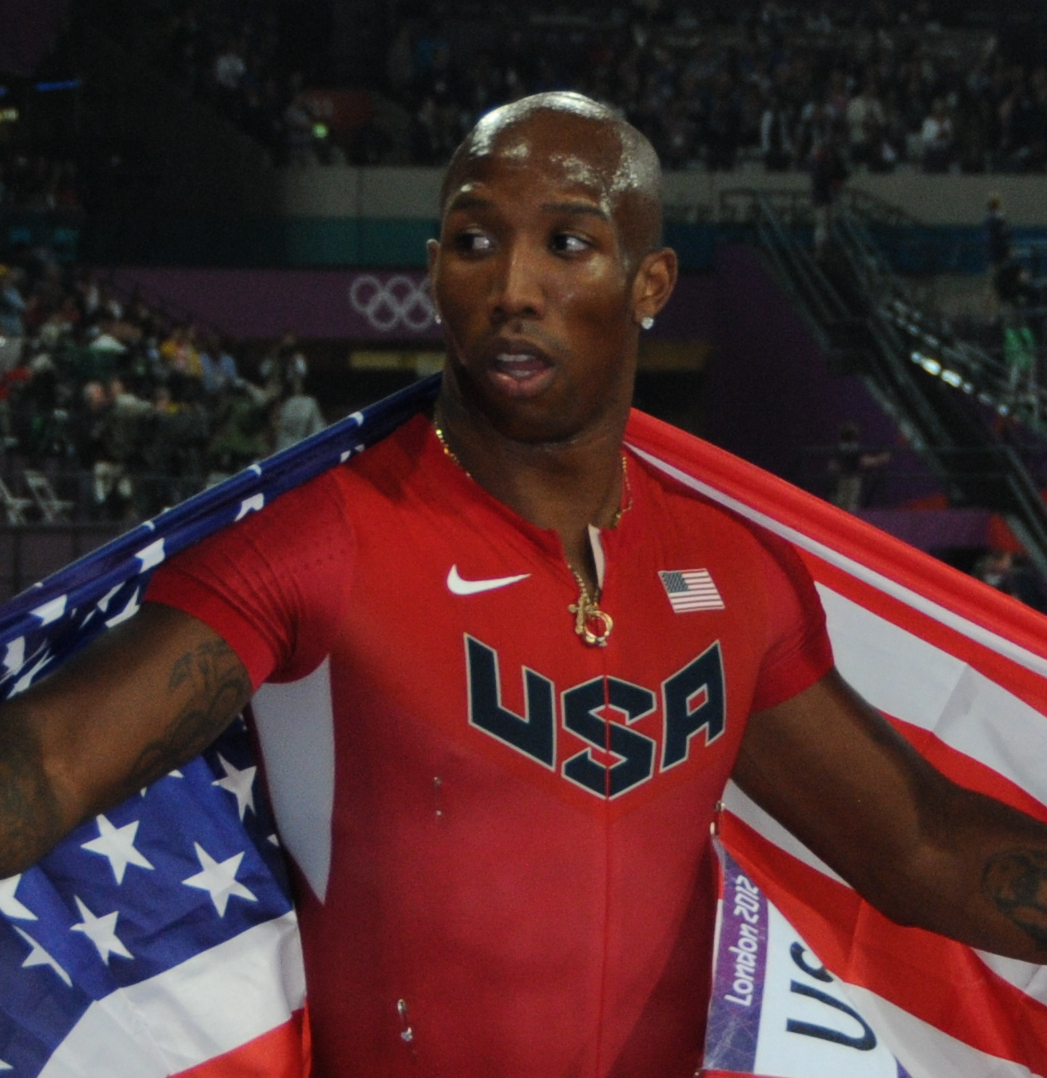

Personal information
- Born: July 13, 1985 (age 41) Coldwater, Mississippi, U.S.
- Height: 5 ft 8 in (1.73 m)
- Weight: 175 lb (79 kg)

Sport
- Sport: Running
- Event: Sprints

Achievements and titles
- Personal bests: 60 m: 6.45 s (Albuquerque 2012) 100 m: 9.95 s (Zürich 2010) 200 m: 20.37 s (Eugene 2009)
Medal record
Men's athletics
Representing the United States
Olympic Games
| Disqualified | 2012 London | 4×100 m relay |
NACAC Championships
| Silver medal – second place | 2015 Costa Rica | 4x100m relay |
USA Outdoor Championships
| Silver medal – second place | 2010 Des Moines | 100 m |
World Junior Championships
| Gold medal – first place | 2004 Grosseto | 4×100 m relay |

David Pretrell "Trell" Kimmons (born July 13, 1985) is an American sprinter.

== Career ==
At the 2004 World Junior Championships in Athletics, Kimmons was part of a Gold medal winning 4×100 meters relay squad that established a junior world record with 38.66 seconds. Kimmons attended Hinds Community College, where he won three individual national championships (200m outdoor in 2005, 60m and 200m indoor in 2006) and set national championship indoor meet records at 60m and 200m. He committed to Mississippi State University in November 2005, but chose to turn pro in March 2006.

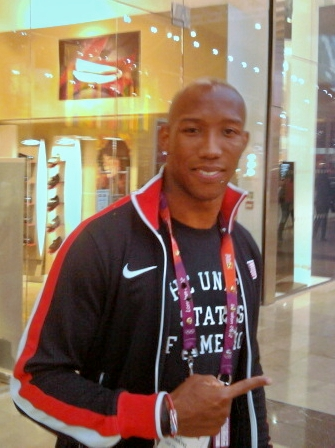
Kimmons at the 2012 Summer Olympics

Kimmons finished fourth in the 60 meters at the 2010 IAAF World Indoor Championships with 6.59 seconds. At the 2010 USA Outdoor Track and Field Championships, he won a silver medal behind Walter Dix. At the 2010 Weltklasse Zürich meeting, he ran a new personal best of 9.95 seconds over 100 metres, becoming the 72nd person to break the 10-second barrier.

At the 2012 Summer Olympics, Kimmons was part of the 4×100m relay team that broke Team USA's national record on route to winning the silver medal. However, on 13 May 2015, the United States Olympic Committee announced that following the doping conviction of Tyson Gay, the medal winning team of 2012 would all be stripped of their medals, meaning that Kimmons had to hand back the only Olympic medal he ever won in his career.

Kimmons finished second at the 2014 USA Indoor Track and Field Championships in the 60 metres and thus qualified for the 2014 IAAF World Indoor Championships.

USADA banned Kimmons for two years, starting in April 2016, for consumption of a banned stimulant via a supplement.

Also a football player in high school, Kimmons caught 13 touchdown passes and made four interceptions during his senior year. He was rated a two-star recruit by Scout.com.
