= Alexander Nelson =

British sprinter

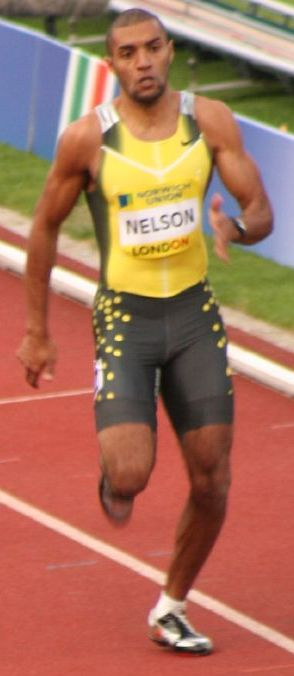
- Nelson at the 200 metres race at the London Grand Prix 2007.

Personal information
- Nationality: British (English)
- Born: 21 March 1988 (age 38) Stoke-on-Trent, England

Sport
- Sport: Athletics
- Event: Sprints
- Club: Cambridge & Coleridge AC

Achievements and titles
- Personal best(s): 100 m: 10.31 s (Mannheim 2005); 200 m: 20.49 s (Eton 2008)
Medal record
Men's Athletics
Representing United Kingdom
World Junior Championships
Bronze medal – third place	2006 Beijing	200 m
World Youth Championships
Silver medal – second place	2005 Marrakesh	100 m
European Junior Championships
Gold medal – first place	2007 Hengelo	200 m

Alexander Lloyd Nelson (born 21 March 1988) is a retired sprint athlete who represented Great Britain and Northern Ireland. His sister Ashleigh is also an international sprinter.

== Biography ==
During the 2006 Beijing World Junior Championships he picked up two bronze medals, in 200 metres and 4 × 100 metre relay. He has a personal best of 6.78 in 60 metres, 10.31 in 100 metres and 20.49 in 200 metres. Also, in 2005 he came second in the 100 metres World Youth Championships in Athletics in a British one, two, behind Harry Aikines-Aryeetey and third at the European Junior Athletics Championships in Kaunas Lithuania. Two years later he returned to the same competition only this time staged in Hengelo, Holland and was victorious over the 200 m and placed 2nd in the 4 × 100 relay.

In July 2007 he came second behind Marlon Devonish in the men's 200 metres sprint at the 2007 British Athletics Championships.

In 2008 Alex achieved the GB "A" Qualifying time for the Olympic Games and placed second at the AAA's Olympic Trials gaining him his first full senior international vest and first appearance at the Olympic Games. However at the 2008 Summer Olympics he did not start in his first round heat over 200 metres due to injury.

In 2011, Nelson retired from the athletics aged 23, saying a number of injuries has taken away his enjoyment of the sport.

== Personal life ==
Nelson is of Jamaican descent through his paternal grandparents. He is the cousin of both reality television contestant Wes Nelson and professional footballer Curtis Nelson.
