= Jerrel Feller =

Dutch athlete

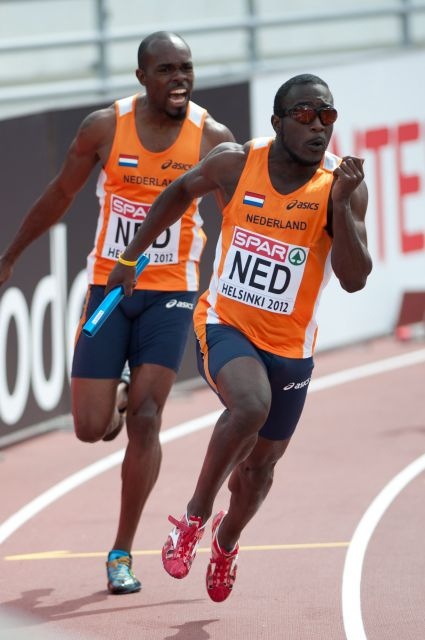
- Jerrel Feller (front) at the 2012 European Championships.

Personal information
- Nationality: Dutch
- Born: 9 June 1987 (age 39) Heemskerk, Netherlands

Sport
- Sport: Athletics

Jerrel Feller (born 9 June 1987 in Heemskerk) is a Dutch athlete who specialises in the 100 meter relay. Feller competed at the 2011 World Athletics Championships. For the 2012 Summer Olympics he was reserve in the 4x 100 meter relay but did not compete.
