= Oluseyi Smith =

Oluseyi Smith OLY
Personal information
- Born: February 21, 1987 (age 39) Ife, Nigeria
- Height: 1.90 m (6 ft 3 in)
- Weight: 95 kg (209 lb)

Sport
- Country: Canada
- Sport: Athletics/Bobsleigh
- Event: 4 × 100m relay/Four-man bobsleigh

Oluseyi "Seyi" Smith (born February 21, 1987) is a Nigerian-born Canadian sprinter and bobsledder. He took part in the 2012 Summer Olympics in the 4 × 100 m relay with teammates Jared Connaughton, Gavin Smellie and Justyn Warner. In the final, the Canadian relay team arrived in third place and initially believed they had won bronze but they were disqualified when officials judged that Connaughton had stepped on the lane line just before passing the baton. The relay team from Trinidad and Tobago were awarded the bronze. Six years later, he took part in the 2018 Winter Olympics in the four-man bobsleigh competition with teammates Justin Kripps, Jesse Lumsden and Alexander Kopacz. The Canadian team finished in 6th place, with a total of 3:16:69.
