= 2004 World Junior Championships in Athletics =

International athletics competition

- Host city: Grosseto, Italy
- Nations: 168
- Athletes: 1261
- Events: 44
- Dates: 12–18 July
- Main venue: Stadio Olimpico Carlo Zecchini

The 2004 World Junior Championships in Athletics were held in Grosseto, Italy on 12–18 July.

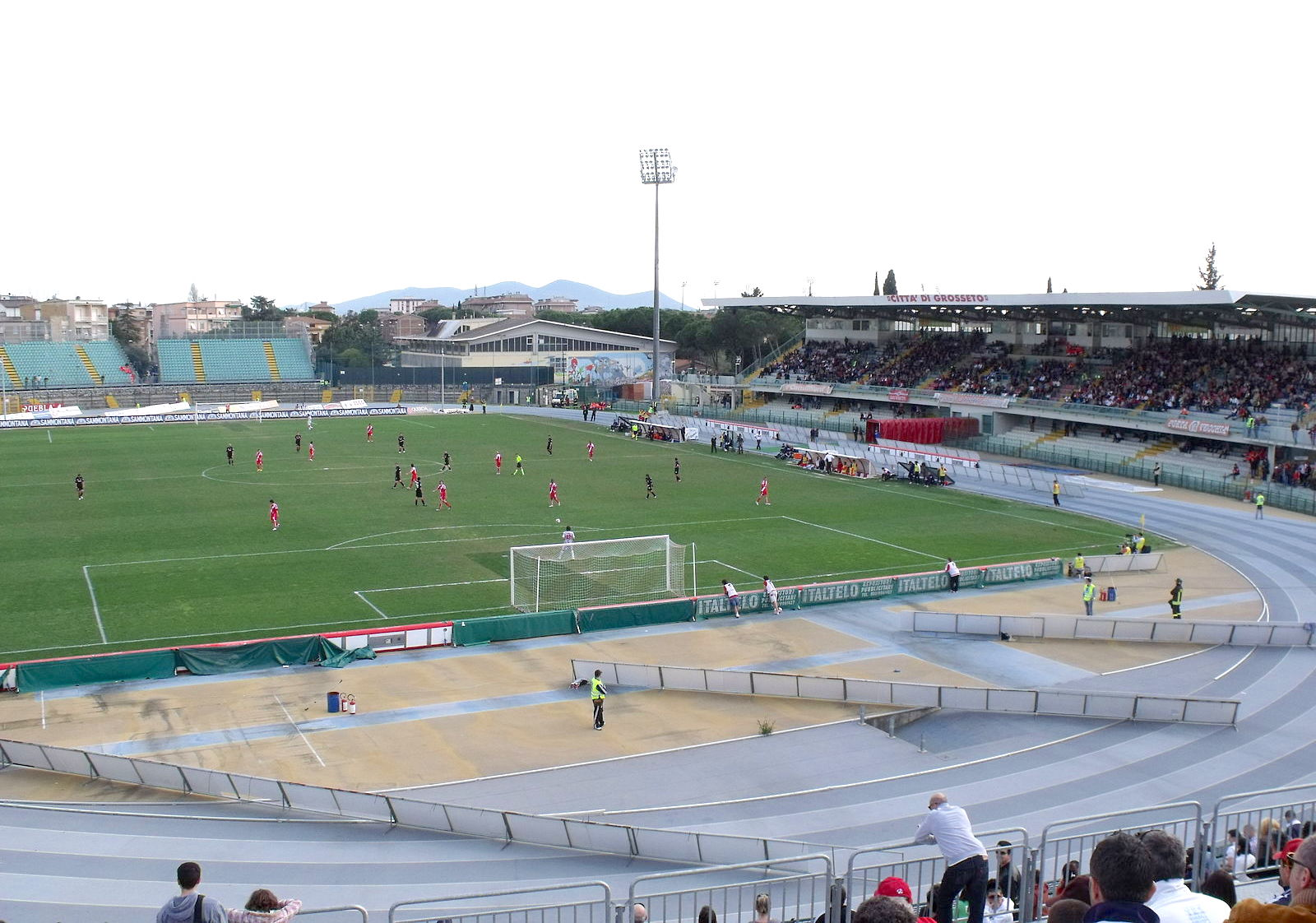
Host stadium in Grosseto.

== Results ==
=== Men ===
Event	Gold		Silver		Bronze	
100 metres	Ivory Williams; United States	10.29 SB	Abidemi Omole; United States	10.31	Remaldo Rose; Jamaica	10.34
200 metres	Andrew Howe; Italy	20.28 CR	Leigh Julius; South Africa	20.88	Jamil James; Trinidad and Tobago	21.00
400 metres	LaShawn Merritt; United States	45.25 WJL	Nagmeldin Ali Abubakr; Sudan	45.97	Obakeng Ngwigwa; Botswana	45.97 NJR
800 metres	Majed Saeed Sultan; Qatar	1:47.33 PB	Alfred Kirwa Yego; Kenya	1:47.39 PB	Selahattin Çobanoglu; Turkey	1:47.71 NJR
1500 metres	Abdalaati Iguider; Morocco	3:35.53 CR	Benson Marrianyi Esho; Kenya	3:35.80 PB	Brimin Kipruto; Kenya	3:35.96 PB
5000 metres	Augustine Kiprono Choge; Kenya	13:28.93 SB	Bado Worku; Ethiopia	13:30.45 PB	Tariku Bekele; Ethiopia	13:30.86
10,000 metres	Boniface Kiprop Toroitich; Uganda	28:03.77 CR	Fabiano Joseph Naasi; Tanzania	28:04.45 SB	Ryuji Ono; Japan	28:30.45
110 metres hurdles	Aries Merritt; United States	13.56	Dayron Robles; Cuba	13.77	Kevin Craddock; United States	13.77
400 metres hurdles	Kerron Clement; United States	48.51 CR	Brandon Johnson; United States	48.62 PB	Ibrahim Al-Hamaidi; Saudi Arabia	48.94 AJR
3000 metres steeplechase	Ronald Kipchumba Rutto; Kenya	8:23.32 PB	Musa Amer Obaid; Qatar	8:23.38 AJR	Moustafa Ahmed Shebto; Qatar	8:26.04 PB
10,000 metres walk	Andrey Ruzavin; Russia	40:58.15	Vladimir Kanaykin; Russia	40:58.48 SB	Kim Hyun-Sub; South Korea	40:59.24 SB
4 × 100 metres relay	United States; Trell Kimmons; Abidemi Omole; Ivory Williams; LaShawn Merritt	38.66 WJR	Jamaica; Kawayne Fisher; Kevin Stewart; Andre Wellington; Remaldo Rose	39.27 SB	Japan; Naohiro Shinada; Hiroyuki Noda; Yuichi Shokawa; Naoki Tsukahara	39.43 SB
4 × 400 metres relay	United States; Brandon Johnson; LaShawn Merritt; Jason Craig; Kerron Clement	3:01.09 WJR	South Africa; Wouter le Roux; Chris Gebhardt; Leigh Julius; L.J. van Zyl	3:04.50 AJR	Japan; Kazunori Ota; Hiroyuki Noda; Teppei Suzuki; Yudai Sasaki	3:05.33 AJR
High jump	Michael Mason; Canada	2.21 PB	Marius Hanniske; Germany	2.21	Hu Tong; China	2.21
Pole vault	Dmitry Starodubtsev; Russia	5.50 PB	Germán Chiaraviglio; Argentina	5.45	Liu Feiliang; China	5.40
Long jump	Andrew Howe; Italy	8.11 WJL	Godfrey Khotso Mokoena; South Africa	8.09 NJR	John Thornell; Australia	7.89
Triple jump	Godfrey Khotso Mokoena; South Africa	16.77	Zhu Shujing; China	16.64	Viktor Kuznyetsov; Ukraine	16.58 NJR
Shot put 6 kg	Georgi Ivanov; Bulgaria	20.70	Jakub Giża; Poland	20.05 PB	Aleksander Grekov; Russia	19.98
Discus throw 1.75 kg	Ehsan Haddadi; Iran	62.14	Oleg Pirog; Russia	60.28 PB	Luka Rujevic; Serbia and Montenegro	59.82
Hammer throw 6 kg	Andrey Azarenkov; Russia	74.11	Mohsen El Anany; Egypt	72.98	Kamilius Bethke; Germany	71.91
Javelin throw	Aleksey Tovarnov; Russia	79.38 WJL	Lohan Rautenbach; South Africa	74.42 PB	Júlio César de Oliveira; Brazil	73.86
Decathlon	Andrei Krauchanka; Belarus	8126 CR	Aleksey Sysoyev; Russia	8047 NJR	Norman Müller; Germany	7942
WR world record | AR area record | CR championship record | GR games record | NR national record | OR Olympic record | PB personal best | SB season best | WL world leading (in a given season)

=== Women ===
Event	Gold		Silver		Bronze	
100 metres	Ashley Owens; United States	11.13 WJL	Jasmen Baldwin-Foss; United States	11.34	Sally McLellan; Australia	11.40 PB
200 metres	Shalonda Solomon; United States	22.82 CR	Anneisha McLaughlin; Jamaica	23.21 SB	Nickesha Anderson; Jamaica	23.46
400 metres	Natasha Hastings; United States	52.04 PB	Sonita Sutherland; Jamaica	52.41	Ashlee Kidd; United States	52.45
800 metres	Natallia Kareiva; Belarus	2:01.47 NJR	Simona Barcău; Romania	2:02.23 PB	Kay-Ann Thompson; Jamaica	2:02.67 NJR
1500 metres	Nelya Neporadna; Ukraine	4:15.90	Anna Alminova; Russia	4:16.32 PB	Siham Hilali; Morocco	4:17.39
3000 metres	Jebichi Yator; Kenya	8:59.80 PB	Safa Aissaoui; Tunisia	9:02.47 NJR	Siham Hilali; Morocco	9:03.16 PB
5000 metres	Meselech Melkamu; Ethiopia	15:21.52 CR	Catherine Chikwakwa; Malawi	15:36.22 NJR	Chiaki Iwamoto; Japan	15:39.59
100 metres hurdles	Ronetta Alexander; United States	13.28	Sabrina Altermatt; Switzerland	13.39 NJR	Stephanie Lichtl; Germany	13.40
400 metres hurdles	Ekaterina Kostetskaya; Russia	55.55 WJL	Zuzana Hejnová; Czech Republic	57.44 NJR	Sherene Pinnock; Jamaica	57.54 PB
3000 metres steeplechase	Gladys Jerotich Kipkemoi; Kenya	9:47.26 CR	Ancuţa Bobocel; Romania	9:49.03 AJR	Cătălina Oprea; Romania	9:50.04 PB
10,000 metres walk	Irina Petrova; Russia	45:50.39 PB	Zhang Nan; China	45:58.54 SB	Vera Sokolova; Russia	46:53.02 SB
4 × 100 metres relay	United States; Ashley Owens; Juanita Broaddus; Jasmen Baldwin-Foss; Shalonda Solomon	43.49 WJL	Jamaica; Nickesha Anderson; Tracy-Ann Rowe; Anneisha McLaughlin; Schillonie Calvert	43.63 SB	France; Natacha Vouaux; Lina Jacques-Sébastien; Aurélie Kamga; Nelly Banco	43.68 NJR
4 × 400 metres relay	United States; Alexandria Anderson; Ashlee Kidd; Stephanie Smith; Natasha Hastings	3:27.60 WJR	Russia; Victoriya Talko; Mariya Shapaeva; Olga Soldatova; Ekaterina Kostetskaya	3:30.03 NJR	Jamaica; Nyoka Cole; Maris Wisdom; Sherene Pinnock; Sonita Sutherland	3:30.37 SB
High jump	Iryna Kovalenko; Ukraine	1.93 WJL	Svetlana Shkolina; Russia	1.91 PB	Sharon Day; United States	1.91 PB
Pole vault	Elizaveta Ryzih; Germany	4.30 PB	Anna Schultze; Germany Zhao Yingying; China 4.25			
Long jump	Denisa Ščerbová; Czech Republic	6.61	Sophie Krauel; Germany	6.47	Veronika Shutkova; Belarus	6.22 PB
Triple jump	Anastasiya Taranova; Russia	13.94 WJL	Xie Limei; China	13.77	Tatyana Yakovleva; Russia	13.67
Shot put	Michelle Carter; United States	17.55 PB	Anna Avdeyeva; Russia	17.13 PB	Christina Schwanitz; Germany	16.52
Discus throw	Ma Xuejun; China	57.85 SB	Darya Pishchalnikova; Russia	57.37	Nadine Müller; Germany	57.13
Hammer throw	Mariya Smolyachkova; Belarus	66.81 CR	Yang Qiaoyu; China	61.67	Laura Gibilisco; Italy	60.95
Javelin throw	Vivian Zimmer; Germany	58.50 CR	Annika Suthe; Germany	57.15	Annabel Thomson; Australia	56.01 AJR
Heptathlon	Justine Robbeson; South Africa	5868 WJL	Viktorija Zemaityte; Lithuania	5810 PB	Julia Mächtig; Germany	5679 PB
WR world record | AR area record | CR championship record | GR games record | NR national record | OR Olympic record | PB personal best | SB season best | WL world leading (in a given season)

== Medal table ==
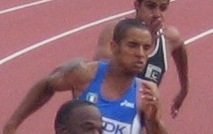
Andrew Howe of Italy won a rare 200 m/long jump double.

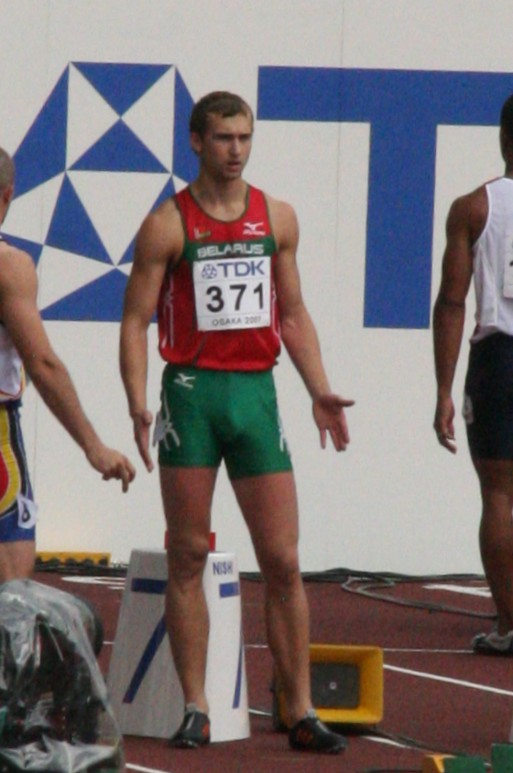
Andrei Krauchanka won the decathlon gold for Belarus.

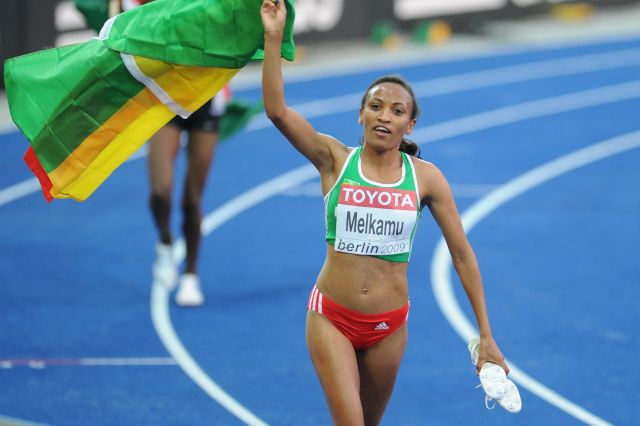
Meselech Melkamu of Ethiopia was triumphant in the 5000 metres.

* Host nation (Italy)

Rank	Nation	Gold	Silver	Bronze	Total
1	United States (USA)	13	3	3	19
2	Russia (RUS)	7	8	3	18
3	Kenya (KEN)	4	2	1	7
4	Belarus (BLR)	3	0	1	4
5	Germany (GER)	2	4	6	12
6	South Africa (RSA)	2	4	0	6
7	Italy (ITA)*	2	0	1	3
7	Ukraine (UKR)	2	0	1	3
9	China (CHN)	1	4	3	8
10	Ethiopia (ETH)	1	1	1	3
10	Qatar (QAT)	1	1	1	3
12	Czech Republic (CZE)	1	1	0	2
13	Morocco (MAR)	1	0	2	3
14	Bulgaria (BUL)	1	0	0	1
14	Canada (CAN)	1	0	0	1
14	Iran (IRN)	1	0	0	1
14	Uganda (UGA)	1	0	0	1
18	Jamaica (JAM)	0	4	5	9
19	Romania (ROM)	0	2	1	3
20	Argentina (ARG)	0	1	0	1
20	Cuba (CUB)	0	1	0	1
20	Egypt (EGY)	0	1	0	1
20	Lithuania (LTU)	0	1	0	1
20	Malawi (MAW)	0	1	0	1
20	Poland (POL)	0	1	0	1
20	Sudan (SUD)	0	1	0	1
20	Switzerland (SUI)	0	1	0	1
20	Tanzania (TAN)	0	1	0	1
20	Tunisia (TUN)	0	1	0	1
30	Japan (JPN)	0	0	4	4
31	Australia (AUS)	0	0	3	3
32	Botswana (BOT)	0	0	1	1
32	Brazil (BRA)	0	0	1	1
32	France (FRA)	0	0	1	1
32	Saudi Arabia (KSA)	0	0	1	1
32	Serbia and Montenegro (SCG)	0	0	1	1
32	South Korea (KOR)	0	0	1	1
32	Trinidad and Tobago (TTO)	0	0	1	1
32	Turkey (TUR)	0	0	1	1
Totals (39 entries)		44	44	44	132

== Participation ==
According to an unofficial count through an unofficial result list, 1261 athletes from 168 countries participated in the event. This is in agreement with the official numbers as published.

- Albania (2)
- Algeria (5)
- Andorra (2)
- Antigua and Barbuda (2)
- Argentina (3)
- Armenia (2)
- Aruba (1)
- Australia (42)
- Austria (3)
- Azerbaijan (1)
- Bahamas (10)
- Bahrain (1)
- Barbados (1)
- Belarus (23)
- Belgium (10)
- Belize (1)
- Benin (1)
- Bermuda (1)
- Bolivia (1)
- Bosnia and Herzegovina (2)
- Botswana (4)
- Brazil (19)
- British Virgin Islands (1)
- Brunei (1)
- Bulgaria (9)
- Burkina Faso (1)
- Burundi (5)
- Canada (21)
- Cape Verde (1)
- Cayman Islands (1)
- Central African Republic (1)
- Chile (5)
- China (31)
- Chinese Taipei (7)
- Colombia (4)
- Cook Islands (1)
- Croatia (14)
- Cuba (4)
- Cyprus (8)
- Czech Republic (15)
- Denmark (1)
- Djibouti (1)
- Dominica (1)
- Dominican Republic (1)
- Ecuador (3)
- Egypt (3)
- El Salvador (1)
- Eritrea (1)
- Estonia (9)
- Ethiopia (9)
- Fiji (2)
- Finland (27)
- France (48)
- French Polynesia (1)
- Gabon (1)
- Georgia (2)
- Germany (63)
- Ghana (1)
- Gibraltar (1)
- Great Britain (32)
- Greece (18)
- Grenada (1)
- Guam (1)
- Guatemala (1)
- Haiti (1)
- Hong Kong (1)
- Hungary (20)
- Iceland (2)
- India (7)
- Iran (4)
- Ireland (10)
- Israel (4)
- Italy (50)
- Jamaica (30)
- Japan (36)
- Jordan (1)
- Kazakhstan (3)
- Kenya (20)
- Kiribati (1)
- Kuwait (1)
- Kyrgyzstan (2)
- Laos (1)
- Latvia (9)
- Lebanon (1)
- Lesotho (1)
- Lithuania (7)
- Macau (1)
- Macedonia (1)
- Madagascar (1)
- Malawi (1)
- Malaysia (1)
- Maldives (1)
- Malta (2)
- Mauritius (1)
- Mexico (11)
- Micronesia (1)
- Monaco (1)
- Morocco (12)
- Myanmar (2)
- Namibia (3)
- Nauru (1)
- Nepal (1)
- Netherlands (10)
- Netherlands Antilles (1)
- New Zealand (10)
- Nicaragua (1)
- Niger (1)
- Nigeria (5)
- Norfolk Island (1)
- Norway (7)
- Oman (4)
- Pakistan (1)
- Palau (1)
- Palestine (1)
- Panama (1)
- Papua New Guinea (1)
- Paraguay (1)
- Peru (4)
- Philippines (1)
- Poland (31)
- Portugal (7)
- Puerto Rico (7)
- Qatar (6)
- Romania (21)
- Russia (60)
- Rwanda (2)
- Saint Kitts and Nevis (1)
- Saint Lucia (1)
- Saint Vincent and the Grenadines (1)
- Samoa (1)
- San Marino (1)
- São Tomé and Príncipe (1)
- Saudi Arabia (14)
- Senegal (6)
- Serbia and Montenegro (6)
- Seychelles (1)
- Singapore (1)
- Slovakia (5)
- Slovenia (6)
- Solomon Islands (1)
- South Africa (37)
- South Korea (8)
- Spain (22)
- Sri Lanka (1)
- Sudan (5)
- Swaziland (1)
- Sweden (17)
- Switzerland (13)
- Syria (1)
- Tajikistan (1)
- Tanzania (1)
- Thailand (1)
- Togo (1)
- Tonga (1)
- Trinidad and Tobago (11)
- Tunisia (4)
- Turkey (14)
- Turkmenistan (1)
- Turks and Caicos Islands (1)
- Uganda (7)
- Ukraine (33)
- United States (78)
- Uruguay (2)
- Uzbekistan (10)
- Venezuela (7)
- Yemen (1)
- Zambia (1)
- Zimbabwe (1)
