= 2009 European Team Championships =

Track and field athletics tournament

- Host city: Leiria, Portugal (Super League)
- Nations: 47
- Events: 40
- Dates: 20–21 June 2009
- Main venue: Estádio Dr. Magalhães Pessoa (Super League)

The first European Athletics Team Championships took place on 20 and 21 June 2009. The track and field athletics tournament run by European Athletics was the successor of the old European Cup competition which was held annually until 2008. The Championships saw a number of new rules introduced, which were criticised by some athletes and observers.

== New rules ==
The European Team Championships modified and added to the rules of its predecessor competition, the European Cup. Men and women's team competed under one unified national banner for the first time. Furthermore, the competition was opened to all European Athletics member states and was divided into four leagues: the Super League, First League, Second League, and Third League. The top two leagues each comprised twelve competing nations, while the Second and Third Leagues had eight and fourteen teams, respectively.

Elimination rules were added to the 3000 metres, 3000 metres steeplechase, and 5000 metres races. In the shorter races, the athlete in last place when five, four, and three laps were remaining was eliminated. In the 5000 m the cut off points were at seven, five, and three laps remaining. The rule change caused some confusion in the women's 3000 m when Spain's Natalia Rodríguez was eliminated with three laps remaining, but carried on running and eventually won the race. She was disqualified, however, and Russia's Gulnara Galkina-Samitova was announced as the winner. Rodriguez said that she thought the elimination stage came at a later point in the race, and winner Galkina-Samitova was critical of the change, stating "This new elimination rule shouldn't exist. Everyone should race till the end". Further problems arose in the men's 5000 m, when four athletes reached the five laps remaining mark at the same time. The group slowed, unable to tell who was eliminated, and while awaiting the photo-finish the four dropped away from the other runners. Race winner Mo Farah complied with the elimination rule but stated that every athlete had a right to finish, branding the rule change as "strange". Sections of the press also expressed reservations about the changes.

Other rule changes included a 'no false start rule' in all the track events. (Any athlete false starting would have been immediately disqualified and received no points, but this did not occur at the inaugural championships). Athletes in the high jump and pole vault events were permitted a maximum total of four fouls throughout the day's competition. Also, the jumping and throwing events featured elimination rounds: athletes had two trial attempts, then the six best-ranked athletes had a third attempt, then finally the top four athletes had a fourth attempt. The elimination rounds caused some upsets, with highly rated Russian hammer thrower, Aleksey Zagornyi failing to progress beyond the trial rounds.

Many athletes did not fully support the new regulations, and European Athletics President Hansjörg Wirz accepted that the rules needed refinement. However, he was pleased with the competition's reception and stated that the rule changes would make athletics more accessible to a wider audience. Portugal's Rui Silva, who won the 1500 metres, remarked that although the regulations had unusual outcomes, a positive approach to the rules, and further refinement, would be beneficial to the sport.

== Calendar ==
Division	Date	Host city	Host country
Super League	20–21 June 2009	Leiria	Portugal
First League	20–21 June 2009	Bergen	Norway
Second League	20–21 June 2009	Banská Bystrica	Slovakia
Third League	20–21 June 2009	Sarajevo	Bosnia and Herzegovina

== League positions ==
The leagues for the 2009 competition were formed by combination of each country's men and women's performances in the European Cup 2008. As the teams were 46, the winning team received 46 points, the second 45 and so on. The leagues were formed as:

Super League		First League		Second League		Third League	
Country	Pts	Country	Pts	Country	Pts	Country	Pts
Russia	1548	Belarus	1217	Ireland	971.5	Moldova	722
Great Britain	1518	Slovenia	1211	Bulgaria	947	Israel	714
Poland	1512	Romania	1182.5	Croatia	942	Denmark	709.5
Germany	1472	Turkey	1166	Latvia	933	Bosnia and Herzegovina	555.5
Italy	1455	Belgium	1139	Slovakia	901	Iceland	550.5
Spain	1426.5	Hungary	1133	Lithuania	839.5	Luxembourg	399.5
France	1423.5	Netherlands	1118	Austria	783	Georgia	356
Ukraine	1412.5	Finland	1072.5	Cyprus	749	Azerbaijan	332.5
Greece	1359.5	Estonia	1035.5			Montenegro	310.5
Sweden	1309	Switzerland	1032.5			Armenia	301.5
Czech Republic	1236	Serbia	1028.5			AASSE	280
Portugal	1222	Norway	974			Albania	191
						Andorra	187
						Macedonia	164

== Super League ==
Place: Estádio Dr. Magalhães Pessoa, Leiria, Portugal

=== Participating countries ===
Czech Republic
France
Germany
Great Britain
Greece
Italy

Poland
Portugal
Russia
Spain
Sweden
Ukraine

=== Men's events ===
Event	Gold		Silver		Bronze	
100 m	Dwain Chambers; Great Britain	10.07	Francis Obikwelu; Portugal	10.20; SB	Emanuele Di Gregorio; Italy	10.21; PB
200 m	Dwain Chambers; Great Britain	20.55	Arnaldo Abrantes; Portugal	20.62; SB	Martial Mbandjock; France	20.67; PB
400 m	Timothy Benjamin; Great Britain	45.57	Johan Wissman; Sweden	45.81; SB	Kamghe Gaba; Germany	45.88; SB
800 m	Miguel Quesada; Spain	1:47.76	Oleksandr Osmolovych; Ukraine	1:48.05	Jeff Lastennet; France	1:48.29
1500 m	Rui Silva; Portugal	3:42.07	Diego Ruiz; Spain	3:42.54	Yoann Kowal; France	3:42.73
3000 m	Jesús España; Spain	8:01.73; SB	Sergey Ivanov; Russia	8:02.18; SB	Daniele Meucci; Italy	8:02.22
5000 m	Mo Farah; Great Britain	13:43.01; SB	Carles Castillejo; Spain	13:49.54	Serhiy Lebid; Ukraine	13:59.85; SB
3000 m steeplechase	Mustafa Mohamed; Sweden	8:28.09	Vincent Zouaoui Dandrieux; France	8:32.05; SB	Ildar Minshin; Russia	8:34.06; SB
110 m hurdles	Andy Turner; Great Britain	13.42	Jackson Quiñónez; Spain	13.53; SB	Matthias Bühler; Germany	13.57
400 m hurdles	Dai Greene; Great Britain	49.26	Fadil Bellaabouss; France	49.91; SB	Periklis Iakovakis; Greece	50.09
4 × 100 m	Giovanni Tomasicchio; Simone Collio; Emanuele Di Gregorio; Fabio Cerutti; Italy	38.77	Stefan Schwab; Till Helmke; Alexander Kosenkow; Martin Keller; Germany	38.78	Ronald Pognon; Martial Mbandjock; Eddy De Lépine; Christophe Lemaitre; France	38.80
4 × 400 m	Conrad Williams; Robert Tobin; Richard Strachan; Timothy Benjamin; Great Britain	3:00.82	Miguel Rigau; Kamghe Gaba; Simon Kirch; Thomas Schneider; Germany	3:02.30	Piotr Klimczak; Kacper Kozłowski; Marcin Marciniszyn; Jan Ciepiela; Poland	3:03.54
High jump	Yuriy Krymarenko; Ukraine	2.31; SB	Jaroslav Bába; Czech Republic	2.31	Aleksandr Shustov; Russia	2.31
Pole vault	Renaud Lavillenie; France	6.01; NR WL	Malte Mohr; Germany	5.75	Łukasz Michalski; Poland	5.70
Long jump	Eusebio Cáceres; Spain	8.00; PB	Nelson Évora; Portugal	7.94	Louis Tsatoumas; Greece	7.91
Triple jump	Nelson Évora; Portugal	17.59	Phillips Idowu; Great Britain	17.50	Fabrizio Schembri; Italy	16.64
Shot put	Tomasz Majewski; Poland	20.81	Manuel Martínez; Spain	20.39; SB	Antonin Žalský; Czech Republic	20.11; SB
Discus	Piotr Małachowski; Poland	66.24	Robert Harting; Germany	65.40	Mario Pestano; Spain	64.66
Hammer	Nicola Vizzoni; Italy	78.15	Szymon Ziółkowski; Poland	78.01; SB	Markus Esser; Germany	77.62
Javelin	Mark Frank; Germany	78.63	Ilya Korotkov; Russia	77.56	Igor Janik; Poland	76.48
WR world record | AR area record | CR championship record | GR games record | NR national record | OR Olympic record | PB personal best | SB season best | WL world leading (in a given season)

=== Women's events ===
Event	Gold		Silver		Bronze	
100 m	Emily Freeman; Great Britain	11.42	Nataliya Pohrebnyak; Ukraine	11.49	Carima Louami; France	11.50; SB
200 m	Yuliya Gushchina; Russia	23.01	Marta Jeschke; Poland	23.34	Christine Ohuruogu; Great Britain	23.40
400 m	Libania Grenot; Italy	51.16; SB	Lyudmila Litvinova; Russia	51.23; SB	Nataliya Pyhyda; Ukraine	51.86
800 m	Yuliya Krevsun; Ukraine	1:58.62; WL	Yekaterina Kostetskaya; Russia	1:59.43; SB	Élodie Guégan; France	1:59.79; SB
1500 m	Nuria Fernández; Spain	4:08.00	Elisa Cusma; Italy	4:08.72; PB	Hannah England; Great Britain	4:09.25
3000 m	Gulnara Samitova-Galkina; Russia	8:46.88; SB	Sylwia Ejdys; Poland	8:58.26; PB	Inês Monteiro; Portugal	9:00.83; SB
5000 m	Dolores Checa; Spain	15:28.87; SB	Silvia Weissteiner; Italy	15:31.33; SB	Sabrina Mockenhaupt; Germany	15:37.67
3000 m steeplechase	Antje Möldner; Germany	9:32.65	Sophie Duarte; France	9:33.63; SB	Yelena Sidorchenkova; Russia	9:36.88
100 m hurdles	Lucie Škrobáková; Czech Republic	12.94; SB	Yuliya Kondakova; Russia	12.94; SB	Olena Krasovska; Ukraine	13.02
400 m hurdles	Anna Jesień; Poland	54.82	Anastasiya Rabchenyuk; Ukraine	55.05	Zuzana Hejnová; Czech Republic	55.29; SB
4 × 100 m	Yevgeniya Polyakova; Natalia Rusakova; Yuliya Gushchina; Yuliya Chermoshanskaya; Russia	43.35	Laura Turner; Kadi-Ann Thomas; Emily Freeman; Joice Maduaka; Great Britain	43.44	Katja Wakan; Anne Möllinger; Cathleen Tschirch; Marion Wagner; Germany	43.57
4 × 400 m	Yelena Voinova; Tatyana Firova; Anastasiya Kapachinskaya; Lyudmila Litvinova; Russia	3:25.25	Daniela Reina; Maria Enrica Spacca; Marta Milani; Libania Grenot; Italy	3:28.77	Vicki Barr; Eilidh Child; Jenny Meadows; Lee McConnell; Great Britain	3:29.29
High jump	Ariane Friedrich; Germany	2.02	Ruth Beitia; Spain	2.00; SB	Antonietta Di Martino; Italy	2.00; SB
Pole vault	Monika Pyrek; Poland	4.70	Yuliya Golubchikova; Russia	4.65; SB	Silke Spiegelburg; Germany	4.60; SB
Long jump	Naide Gomes; Portugal	6.83	Olga Kucherenko; Russia	6.73	Teresa Dobija; Poland	6.45
Triple jump	Teresa Nzola Meso Ba; France	14.40; SB	Anna Pyatykh; Russia	14.10	Magdelín Martínez; Italy	14.01
Shot put	Nadine Kleinert; Germany	19.59	Chiara Rosa; Italy	18.57	Laurence Manfredi; France	18.16; SB
Discus	Natalya Semenova; Ukraine	61.58	Mélina Robert-Michon; France	61.41	Věra Cechlová; Czech Republic	60.50
Hammer	Anita Włodarczyk; Poland	75.23	Betty Heidler; Germany	74.97; SB	Stiliani Papadopoulou; Greece	71.18
Javelin	Christina Obergföll; Germany	68.59; WL	Barbora Špotáková; Czech Republic	65.89	Zahra Bani; Italy	59.11
WR world record | AR area record | CR championship record | GR games record | NR national record | OR Olympic record | PB personal best | SB season best | WL world leading (in a given season)

=== Final standings ===
Pos	Country	Pts
1	Germany	329.5
2	Great Britain	308
3	France	306
4	Poland	295
5	Italy	284
6	Ukraine	265
7	Spain	262
8	Russia	256
9	Greece	223
10	Czech Republic	220.5
11	Portugal	207
12	Sweden	142

New standing points after Russian athletes’ late disqualification.

=== Score table ===
Event		CZE	FRA	GER	GBR	GRE	ITA	POL	POR	RUS	ESP	SWE	UKR
100 metres	M	2.5	9	7	12	4	10	8	11	1	5.5	2.5	5.5
100 metres	W	2	10	8	12	4	8	8	5	6	1	3	11
200 metres	M	2	10	9	12	4	5	3	11	6	8	1	7
200 metres	W	2	9	7	10	4	8	6	11	12	5	3	–
400 metres	M	5	9	10	12	6	1	4	11	8	2	11	3
400 metres	W	3	7	8	9	4	12	6	2	11	6	1	10
800 metres	M	5	10	6	9	8	7	4	3	2	12	1	11
800 metres	W	8	10	7	9	5	6	2	3	11	4	1	12
1500 metres	M	2	10	9	8	1	6	7	12	3	11	4	5
1500 metres	W	2	6	3	10	5	10	8	7	0	12	4	9
3000 metres	M	5	2	8	9	4	10	6	7	11	12	3	–
3000 metres	W	3	8	–	9	5	7	11	10	12	–	4	6
5000 metres	M	4	6	5	12	1	7	3	8	9	11	2	10
5000 metres	W	–	7	10	6	–	11	5	8	9	12	4	–
3000 metre steeple	M	6	11	8	5	2	3	7	1	10	9	12	4
3000 metre steeple	W	1	11	12	8	6	3	5	9	10	7	2	4
110/100 metre hurdles	M	2.5	9	10	12	2.5	5	7	1	8	11	6	4
110/100 metre hurdles	W	12	8	9	2	4	5	7	3	11	6	1	10
400 metre hurdles	M	6	11	7	12	10	4	5	3	9	2	1	8
400 metre hurdles	W	10	7	8	9	2	6	12	–	5	4	3	11
4 × 100 metres relay	M	–	10	11	3	5	12	8	9	7	6	4	–
4 × 100 metres relay	W	3	–	10	11	5	7	8	6	12	2	4	9
4 × 400 metres relay	M	4	8	11	12	5	6	9	2	10	3	1	7
4 × 400 metres relay	W	6	8	9	10	3	11	–	4	12	5	2	7
High jump	M	11	2.5	2.5	4	7	5	8	1	10	6	9	12
High jump	W	5	2.5	12	2.5	6.5	10	4	1	9	11	8	6.5
Pole vault	M	6.5	12	11	6.5	9	4	10	3	8	2	5	1
Pole vault	W	8	6	10	9	7	4	12	3	11	5	1	2
Long jump	M	9	6	3	8	10	1	2	11	7	12	4	5
Long jump	W	5	7	6	3	9	4	10	12	11	2	1	8
Triple jump	M	2	8	4	11	7	10	3	12	5	6	1	9
Triple jump	W	4	12	2	3	7	10	9	5	11	6	1	8
Shot put	M	10	8	9	7	3	2	12	4	5	11	1	6
Shot put	W	6	10	12	1	7	11	9	2	5	3	8	4
Discus throw	M	5	3	11	6	7	8	12	2	4	10	1	9
Discus throw	W	10	11	9	4	5	7	8	2	1	3	6	12
Hammer throw	M	8	4	10	1	7	12	11	2	5	6	3	9
Hammer throw	W	5	8	11	7	10	9	12	2	–	6	3	4
Javelin throw	M	7	4	12	5	8	1	10	3	11	6	2	9
Javelin throw	W	11	2	12	3	8	9	5	1	10	7	4	6
Event		CZE	FRA	GER	GBR	GRE	ITA	POL	POR	RUS	ESP	SWE	UKR

=== Records ===
Country	Name	Event	Results	Notes
Great Britain	Kate Dennison	Women's Pole Vault	4.55	NR
France	Renaud Lavillenie	Men's Pole Vault	6.01	NR
Portugal	Eva Vital	Women's 100 m hurdles	13.66	NJR

== First League ==
- Place: Fana Stadion, Bergen, Norway

=== Participating countries ===
Belarus
Belgium
Estonia
Finland
Hungary
Netherlands

Norway
Romania
Serbia
Slovenia
Switzerland
Turkey

=== Men's events ===
Event	Gold		Silver		Bronze	
100 m	Jaysuma Saidy Ndure; Norway	10.14; SB	Kristof Beyens; Belgium	10.37; SB	Patrick van Luijk; Netherlands	10.38
200 m	Jaysuma Saidy Ndure; Norway	20.94	Kristof Beyens; Belgium	21.03	Patrick van Luijk; Netherlands	21.03
400 m	Cédric Van Branteghem; Belgium	46.59	Matti Välimäki; Finland	46.83; PB	Sebastjan Jagarinec; Slovenia	47.20
800 m	Tamás Kazi; Hungary	1:48.99	Ioan Zaizin; Romania	1:49.37	Robert Lathouwers; Netherlands	1:49.48
1500 m	Halil Akkaş; Turkey	3:40.81; SB	Arnoud Okken; Netherlands	3:41.04; SB	Goran Nava; Serbia	3:42.73
3000 m	Selim Bayrak; Turkey	8:00.45; SB	Mirko Petrović; Serbia	8:06.38; SB	Tiidrek Nurme; Estonia	8:02.22
5000 m	Selim Bayrak; Turkey	13:58.71	Abdi Nageeye; Netherlands	14:02.43	Stsiapan Rahautsou; Belarus	14:03.70; SB
3000 m steeplechase	Jukka Keskisalo; Finland	8:30.89	Halil Akkaş; Turkey	8:31.85; SB	Bjørnar Ustad Kristensen; Norway	8:35.18
110 m hurdles	Maksim Lynsha; Belarus	13.86	Damien Broothaerts; Belgium	13.95	Juha Sonck; Finland	14.04
400 m hurdles	Jussi Heikkilä; Finland	50.49	Vincent Vanryckeghem; Belgium	50.50; SB	Vincent Kerssies; Netherlands	51.14; SB
4 × 100 m	Gregory Sedoc; Caimin Douglas; Guus Hoogmoed; Patrick van Luijk; Netherlands	39.04	Pascal Mancini; Marc Schneeberger; Marco Cribari; Reto Schenkel; Switzerland	39.55	Bostjan Fridrih; Matic Osovnikar; Joze Vrtacic; Gregor Kokalovic; Slovenia	39.82
4 × 400 m	Arnaud Ghislain; Vincent van Ryckeghem; Nils Duerinck; Antoine Gillet; Belgium	3:07.30	Joeri Moerman; Steven de Jesus; Steven Zwerink; Dennis Spillekom; Netherlands	3:07.57	Marcell Deák-Nagy; László Bartha; Dávid Takács; Zoltán Kovács; Hungary	3:08.54
High jump	Dragutin Topić; Serbia	2.29; SB	Martijn Nuijens; Netherlands	2.29; PB	Stijn Stroobants; Belgium	2.26; PB
Pole vault	Robbert Jansen; Netherlands	5.50	Jurij Rovan; Slovenia	5.40	Denis Goossens; Belgium	5.40
Long jump	Tommi Evilä; Finland	7.90; SB	Julien Fivaz; Switzerland	7.83; SB	Boštjan Fridrih; Slovenia	7.66
Triple jump	Alin Anghel; Romania	16.51; SB	Fabian Florant; Netherlands	16.41	Dzmitry Platnitski; Belarus	16.32
Shot put	Yury Bialou; Belarus	19.74	Lajos Kürthy; Hungary	19.61	Miran Vodovnik; Slovenia	19.53
Discus	Gerd Kanter; Estonia	67.00	Zoltán Kővágó; Hungary	63.44	Frantz Kruger; Finland	59.97
Hammer	Krisztián Pars; Hungary	77.78	Primož Kozmus; Slovenia	77.34	Pavel Kryvitski; Belarus	77.21
Javelin	Tero Pitkämäki; Finland	86.78; SB	Andreas Thorkildsen; Norway	85.04	Stefan Müller; Switzerland	79.08
WR world record | AR area record | CR championship record | GR games record | NR national record | OR Olympic record | PB personal best | SB season best | WL world leading (in a given season)

=== Women's events ===
Event	Gold		Silver		Bronze	
100 m	Ezinne Okparaebo; Norway	11.51	Aksana Drahun; Belarus	11.68	Olivia Borlée; Belgium	11.69; SB
200 m	Olivia Borlée; Belgium	23.82	Andreea Ograzeanu; Romania	23.89	Sabina Veit; Slovenia	23.96
400 m	Barbara Petráhn; Hungary	52.94; SB	Merve Aydin; Turkey	53.48; PB	Katsiaryna Bobryk; Belarus	53.63; SB
800 m	Yvonne Hak; Netherlands	2:01.50	Yeliz Kurt; Turkey	2:01.54	Natallia Kareiva; Belarus	2:02.06; SB
1500 m	Sonja Roman; Slovenia	4:13.75	Yeliz Kurt; Turkey	4:14.00	Natallia Kareiva; Belarus	4:14.17
3000 m	Dudu Karakaya; Turkey	9:02.57; PB	Sonja Roman; Slovenia	9:03.99; PB	Krisztina Papp; Hungary	9:10.46; SB
5000 m	Dudu Karakaya; Turkey	15:24.86; SB	Olivera Jevtić; Serbia	15:29.12	Karoline Bjerkeli Grøvdal; Norway	15:29.82; NJR
3000 m steeplechase	Ancuța Bobocel; Romania	9:42.87	Türkan Erişmiş; Turkey	9:43.25; SB	Karoline Bjerkeli Grøvdal; Norway	9:47.66; PB
100 m hurdles	Nevin Yanit; Turkey	13.10	Lisa Urech; Switzerland	13.27; NJR	Jelena Jotanovic; Serbia	13.44
400 m hurdles	Krystsina Viadzernikava; Belarus	58.59; SB	Angela Moroșanu; Romania	58.77	Hege Vold; Norway	58.86
4 × 100 m	Siri Eritsland; Folake Akinyemi; Elisabeth Slettum; Ezinne Okparaebo; Norway	44.47	Yuliya Balykina; Volha Aatashka; Anna Bagdanovich; Aksana Drahun; Belarus	44.79	Eline Berings; Hanna Mariën; Frauke Penen; Olivia Borlée; Belgium	44.97
4 × 400 m	Florina Rusu; Anamaria Ioniță; Elena Mirela Lavric; Angela Moroșanu; Romania	3:35.18	Bianka Varga; Anna Mátyus; Barbara Petráhn; Natalia Zsigovics; Hungary	3:35.55	Sanne Verstegen; Yvonne Hak; Romara van Noort; Annemarie Schulte; Netherlands	3:36.26
High jump	Stine Kufaas; Norway	1.91; PB	Anna Iljuštšenko; Estonia	1.86; SB	Hannelore Desmet; Belgium	1.86
Pole vault	Nicole Büchler; Switzerland	4.10; SB	Minna Nikkanen; Finland	4.10	Rianna Galiart; Netherlands	4.10
Long jump	Nastassia Mironchyk; Belarus	6.74	Karin Mey Melis; Turkey	6.57	Viorica Țigău; Romania	6.42
Triple jump	Snežana Rodić; Slovenia	13.44	Sirkka-Liisa Kivine; Estonia	13.39	Natallia Viatkina; Belarus	13.37
Shot put	Anca Heltne; Romania	18.43	Melissa Boekelman; Netherlands	17.19	Alena Kopets; Belarus	17.08
Discus	Nicoleta Grasu; Romania	62.51	Dragana Tomašević; Serbia	55.84	Hanna Mazhunova; Belarus	52.53
Hammer	Merja Korpela; Finland	69.34; PB	Sviatlana Sudak; Turkey	66.95	Alena Matoshka; Belarus	63.87
Javelin	Kirsi Ahonen; Finland	55.68; SB	Moonika Aava; Estonia	54.97	Maryna Novik; Belarus	54.90
WR world record | AR area record | CR championship record | GR games record | NR national record | OR Olympic record | PB personal best | SB season best | WL world leading (in a given season)

=== Final standings ===
Pos	Country	Pts
1	Belarus	332
2	Finland	289
3	Norway	279
4	Netherlands	274
5	Belgium	269.5
6	Turkey	266.5
7	Romania	262.5
8	Hungary	260
9	Slovenia	252.5
10	Estonia	223
11	Switzerland	203
12	Serbia	191

=== Records ===
Country	Name	Event	Results	Notes
Estonia	Lembi Vaher	Women's Pole Vault	4.00	=NR
Norway	Karoline Bjerkeli Grøvdal	Women's 5000 m	15:29.82	NJR
Switzerland	Lisa Urech	Women's 100 m hurdles	13.17	NJR

=== Score table ===
Event		BLR	BEL	EST	FIN	HUN	NED	NOR	ROU	SRB	SLO	SUI	TUR
100 metres	M	3	11	1	7	5	10	12	6	4	8	9	2
100 metres	W	11	10	2	7	4	3	12	5	6	9	8	1
200 metres	M	7	11	9	3	1	10	12	5	2	6	8	4
200 metres	W	9	12	6	8	7	3	5	11	1	10	2	4
400 metres	M	9	12	5	11	6	8	3	2	1	10	4	7
400 metres	W	10	9	3	2	12	4	7	8	1	5	6	11
800 metres	M	9	7	6	2	12	10	4	11	8	1	5	3
800 metres	W	10	6	2	5	1	12	9	8	7	3	4	11
1500 metres	M	4	9	7	3	8	11	6	1	10	2	5	12
1500 metres	W	10	3	1	4	5	9	6	7	8	12	2	11
3000 metres	M	7	4	10	6	1	5	8	2	11	3	9	12
3000 metres	W	8	5	1	3	10	2	9	7	6	11	4	12
5000 metres	M	10	7	1	5	4	11	8	6	9	2	3	12
5000 metres	W	7	6	4	5	8	9	10	1	11	3	2	12
3000 metre steeplechase	M	7	9	2	12	5	4	10	8	1	6	3	11
3000 metre steeplechase	W	6	5	7	9	8	0	10	12	2	3	4	11
110 metre hurdles 100 metre hurdles	M	12	11	8	10	0	0	4	9	7	5	0	6
110 metre hurdles 100 metre hurdles	W	9	1	6	3	5	4	7	2	10	8	11	12
400 metre hurdles	M	8	11	7	12	9	10	4	3	1	2	5	6
400 metre hurdles	W	12	6	3	9	4	8	10	11	7	1	5	2
4 × 100 metres relay	M	3	4	6	8	9	12	0	7	0	10	11	5
4 × 100 metres relay	W	11	10	3	0	7	5	12	9	6	8	0	4
4 × 400 metres relay	M	5	12	6	9	10	11	3	4	2	8	1	7
4 × 400 metres relay	W	8	2	1	6	11	10	7	12	3	5	9	4
High jump	M	9	10	2.5	8	5	11	4	6.5	12	6.5	1	2.5
High jump	W	5	10.5	10.5	8	4	2	12	9	1	3	6	7
Pole vault	M	9	10	7	8	4	12	6	2	5	11	0	3
Pole vault	W	3	5	7	11	9	10	6	2	4	8	12	0
Long jump	M	4	7	9	12	1	3	8	5	2	10	11	6
Long jump	W	12	5	9	4	2	3	1	10	8	7	6	11
Triple jump	M	10	2	9	8	1	11	4	12	3	7	6	5
Triple jump	W	10	2	11	9	8	6	7	5	1	12	4	3
Shot put	M	12	7	9	5	11	4	3	6	8	10	1	2
Shot put	W	10	0	6	7	8	11	5	12	4	2	3	9
Discus throw	M	5	2	12	10	11	7	9	6	1	3	8	4
Discus throw	W	10	5	3	6	7	8	9	12	11	1	2	4
Hammer throw	M	10	5	1	8	12	3	6	7	2	11	4	9
Hammer throw	W	10	6	0	12	8	4	7	0	3	9	5	11
Javelin throw	M	8	4	9	12	7	3	11	2	1	5	10	6
Javelin throw	W	10	6	11	12	7	5	3	9	1	8	4	2
Country		BLR	BEL	EST	FIN	HUN	NED	NOR	ROU	SRB	SLO	SUI	TUR
Total		332	269.5	223	289	257	274	279	262.5	191	254.5	203	266.5

== Second League ==
- Place: Banská Bystrica, Slovakia

=== Participating countries ===
Austria
Bulgaria
Croatia
Cyprus

Ireland
Latvia
Lithuania
Slovakia

=== Men's events ===
Event	Gold		Silver		Bronze	
100 m	Ryan Moseley; Austria	10.35	Panayiotis Ioannou; Cyprus	10.44	Rytis Sakalauskas; Lithuania	10.47
200 m	Paul Hession; Ireland	20.56; SB	Ryan Moseley; Austria	21.02	Elvijs Misāns; Latvia	21.05; PB
400 m	Clemens Zeller; Austria	46.41	Željko Vincek; Croatia	46.97; SB	Brian Gregan; Ireland	47.01
800 m	Thomas Chamney; Ireland	1:50.33	Jozef Repčík; Slovakia	1:50.90	Vitalij Kozlov; Lithuania	1:50.91
1500 m	Alan Obrien; Ireland	3:50.17; PB	Slavko Petrović; Croatia	3:50.57; SB	Felix Kernbichler; Austria	3:50.84
3000 m	Georg Mlynek; Austria	8:21.00; SB	Sean Connolly; Ireland	8:21.71	Slavko Petrović; Croatia	8:26.69
5000 m	Michael Schmid; Austria	14:17.20	Mark Hanrahan; Ireland	14:20.30	Mareks Floroseks; Latvia	14:36.87; SB
3000 m steeplechase	Konstantins Savcuks; Latvia	9:10.82	Mark Kirwan; Ireland	9:19.02	Yolo Nikolov; Bulgaria	9:28.33
110 m hurdles	Jurica Grabušić; Croatia	13.69; SB	Ian McDonald; Ireland	14.11	Karlis Daube; Latvia	14.16
400 m hurdles	Minás Alozídis; Cyprus	51.35; PB	Valdas Valintelis; Lithuania	52.00; PB	Tom Carey; Ireland	52.34
4 × 100 m	Toms Bergs; Janis Mezitis; Maris Grenis; Elvijs Misāns; Lithuania	40.19	Milen Tsvetanov; Yordan Yovchev; Nikolai Todorov; Desislav Gunev; Bulgaria	40.28	Jason Smyth; Paul Hession; Darragh Graham; Steven Colvert Tate; Ireland	40.33
4 × 400 m	Roman Turčáni; Jozef Pelikán; Juraj Mokráš; Jozef Repčík; Slovakia	3:11.97	Mirko Hižman; Ivan Rimac; Marko Babič; Željko Vincek; Croatia	3:12.38	Arturas Kulnis; Vitalij Kozlov; Egidijus Svegzda; Linas Bruzas; Lithuania	3:13.35
High jump	Kyriakos Ioannou; Cyprus	2.19	Peter Horák; Slovakia	2.16	Angel Kararadev; Bulgaria	2.16
Pole vault	Spas Buhalov; Bulgaria	5.50; SB	Mareks Ārents; Latvia	5.30; PB	Tomáš Čekan; Slovakia	5.00
Long jump	Povilas Mykolaitis; Lithuania	7.89; SB	Nikolay Atanasov; Bulgaria	7.83	Jaroslav Dobrovodský; Slovakia	7.43
Triple jump	Momchil Karailiev; Bulgaria	17.08	Povilas Mykolaitis; Lithuania	16.24	Elvijs Misans; Latvia	15.96
Shot put	Milan Haborák; Slovakia	19.74	Nedžad Mulabegović; Croatia	19.33	Māris Urtāns; Latvia	19.25
Discus	Gerhard Mayer; Austria	61.53	Apostolos Parellis; Cyprus	60.94; NR	Martin Marić; Croatia	57.99
Hammer	Libor Charfreitag; Slovakia	75.62	András Haklits; Croatia	74.04	Benjamin Siart; Austria	71.99; PB
Javelin	Kolio Neshev; Bulgaria	73.38	Tomas Intas; Lithuania	69.89	Martin Strasser; Austria	68.67; SB
WR world record | AR area record | CR championship record | GR games record | NR national record | OR Olympic record | PB personal best | SB season best | WL world leading (in a given season)

=== Women's events ===
Event	Gold		Silver		Bronze	
100 m	Lina Grinčikaitė; Lithuania	11.59; SB	Eleni Artymata; Cyprus	11.62	Bettina Müller-Weissina; Austria	11.63
200 m	Eleni Artymata; Cyprus	23.39	Lina Grinčikaitė; Lithuania	23.82	Inna Eftimova; Bulgaria	24.00
400 m	Agnė Orlauskaitė; Lithuania	53.44	Ieva Zunda; Latvia	53.65; SB	Danijela Grgic; Croatia	54.31
800 m	Lucia Klocová; Slovakia	2:03.54	Eglė Balčiūnaitė; Lithuania	2:04.12	Kelly McNeice; Ireland	2:05.18
1500 m	Irina Krakoviak; Lithuania	4:15.15	Deirdre Byrne; Ireland	4:16.32	Agata Strausa; Latvia	4:24.79
3000 m	Inna Poluškina; Latvia	9:09.00; SB	Kerry Harty; Ireland	9:09.50; PB	Yana Georgieva; Bulgaria	9:38.45; PB
5000 m	Rasa Drazdauskaitė; Lithuania	16:25.23	Lisa Stublic; Croatia	16:26.28; NR	Ava Hutchinson; Ireland	16:50.78
3000 m steeplechase	Fionnuala Britton; Ireland	10:05.70	Polina Jelizarova; Latvia	10:18.26; SB	Lisa Stublic; Croatia	10:24.10
100 m hurdles	Derval O'Rourke; Ireland	13.17	Miriam Bobková; Slovakia	13.22; SB	Sonata Tamošaitytė; Lithuania	13.52
400 m hurdles	Vania Stambolova; Bulgaria	55.86	Nikolina Horvat; Croatia	57.02; SB	Michelle Carey; Ireland	58.02
4 × 100 m	Silvija Peseckaitė; Lina Grinčikaitė; Sonata Tamošaitytė; Audra Dagelytė; Lithuania	44.79	Kelly Proper; Louise Kiernan; Claire Bergin; Niamh Whelan; Ireland	45.17	Bianca Dürr; Doris Röser; Beate Schrott; Bettina Müller-Weissina; Austria	45.50
4 × 400 m	Aina Valatkevičiūtė; Eglė Balčiūnaitė; Kristina Jasinskaitė; Agnė Orlauskaitė; Lithuania	3:36.15	Romana Tea Kirinić; Anita Banović; Nikolina Horvat; Danijela Grgić; Croatia	3:37.25	Michelle Carey; Joanne Cuddihy; Fiona O'Friel; Claire Bergin; Ireland	3:38.18
High jump	Blanka Vlašić; Croatia	2.04	Venelina Veneva; Bulgaria	1.90	Karina Vnukova; Lithuania	1.81
Pole vault	Marianna Zachariadou; Cyprus	4.35; PB	Daniela Höllwarth; Austria	3.70	Claire Wilkinson; Israel	3.70
Long jump	Jana Velďáková; Slovakia	6.54	Kelly Proper; Ireland	6.42	Lauma Grīva; Latvia	6.26
Triple jump	Dana Veldáková; Slovakia	14.17	Andriana Banova; Bulgaria	13.65; SB	Jolanta Verseckaitė; Lithuania	12.75
Shot put	Austra Skujytė; Lithuania	17.21	Bettina Schasse; Austria	14.16; PB	Florentia Kappa; Cyprus	13.99
Discus	Zinaida Sendriūtė; Lithuania	56.63	Vera Begic; Croatia	55.24	Dace Šteinerte; Latvia	49.05
Hammer	Martina Hrašnová; Slovakia	74.95	Eileen O'Keeffe; Ireland	68.25; SB	Laura Igaune; Latvia	59.60; NR
Javelin	Elisabeth Pauer; Austria	55.80	Madara Palameika; Latvia	53.93	Indrė Jakubaitytė; Lithuania	52.37
WR world record | AR area record | CR championship record | GR games record | NR national record | OR Olympic record | PB personal best | SB season best | WL world leading (in a given season)

=== Final standings ===
Pos	Country	Pts
1	Lithuania	216
2	Ireland	200.5
3	Latvia	181
4	Austria	180.5
5	Slovakia	180
6	Croatia	174
7	Bulgaria	163
8	Cyprus	140

=== Records ===
Country	Name	Event	Results	Notes
Cyprus	Mariánna Zahariádi	Women's Pole Vault	4.35	NJR
Cyprus	Apostolos Parellis	Men's Discus	60.94	NR
Croatia	Lisa Stublic	Women's 5000 m	16:26.28	NR
Latvia	Laura Igaune	Women's Hammer	59.60	NR

=== Score table ===
Event		AUT	BUL	CRO	CYP	IRL	LAT	LTU	SVK
100 metres	M	8	3	5	7	4	2	6	1
100 metres	W	6	4	5	7	3	2	8	1
200 metres	M	7	3	2	1	8	6	5	4
200 metres	W	5	6	3	8	4	1	7	2
400 metres	M	8	5	7	1	6	3	4	2
400 metres	W	2	3	6	1	5	7	8	4
800 metres	M	4	1	5	2	8	3	6	7
800 metres	W	5	1	4	2	6	3	7	8
1500 metres	M	6	1	7	3	8	2	4	5
1500 metres	W	2	5	1	3	7	6	8	4
3000 metres	M	8	1	6	3	7	2	5	4
3000 metres	W	5	6	2	1	7	8	4	3
5000 metres	M	8	3	2	1	7	6	5	4
5000 metres	W	1	3	7	2	6	4	8	5
3000 metre steeplechase	M	2	6	1	4	7	8	5	3
3000 metre steeplechase	W	1	3	6	4	8	7	5	2
110 metre hurdles 100 metre hurdles	M	4	2	8	1	7	6	3	5
110 metre hurdles 100 metre hurdles	W	3	1	4	5	8	2	6	7
400 metre hurdles	M	3	2	1	8	6	4	7	5
400 metre hurdles	W	5	8	7	1	6	4	2	3
4 × 100 metres relay	M	0	7	0	4	6	5	8	3
4 × 100 metres relay	W	6	4	5	1	7	3	8	2
4 × 400 metres relay	M	4	1	7	2	5	3	6	8
4 × 400 metres relay	W	2	5	7	1	6	3	8	4
High jump	M	2	6	1	8	3	5	4	7
High jump	W	3	7	8	1	5	5	5	2
Pole vault	M	5	8	0	3	4	7	2	6
Pole vault	W	6.5	1	5	8	6.5	4	2	3
Long jump	M	3	7	2	5	1	4	8	6
Long jump	W	4	5	2	3	7	6	1	8
Triple jump	M	2	8	3	4	1	6	7	5
Triple jump	W	5	7	3	2	4	1	6	8
Shot put	M	3	5	7	4	1	6	2	8
Shot put	W	7	3	1	6	2	4	8	5
Discus throw	M	8	5	6	7	1	4	3	2
Discus throw	W	3	2	7	5	1	6	8	4
Hammer throw	M	6	2	7	4	3	5	1	8
Hammer throw	W	4	2	5	0	7	6	3	8
Javelin throw	M	6	8	4	3	1	5	7	2
Javelin throw	W	8	3	5	4	1	7	6	2
Country		AUT	BUL	CRO	CYP	IRL	LAT	LTU	SVK
Total		180.5	163	174	140	200.5	181	216	180

== Third League ==
- Place: Sarajevo, Bosnia and Herzegovina

=== Participating countries ===
Athletic Association of Small States of Europe
(Liechtenstein, Malta, Monaco, San Marino)
Andorra
Armenia
Azerbaijan
Bosnia and Herzegovina
Denmark

Georgia
Iceland
Israel
Luxembourg
Macedonia
Moldova
Montenegro

=== Men's events ===
Event	Gold		Silver		Bronze	
100 m	Ramil Quliyev; Azerbaijan	10.76	Nedim Čović; Bosnia and Herzegovina	10.86	Martin Krabbe; Denmark	10.89
200 m	Ramil Quliyev; Azerbaijan	20.71	Nedim Čović; Bosnia and Herzegovina	21.48	Tal Mor; Israel	21.89
400 m	Andreas Bube; Denmark	47.06; PB	Yuriy Shapsai; Israel	47.77	Endrik Zilbershtein; Georgia	47.92; NJR
800 m	David Fiegen; Luxembourg	1:50.73	Dušan Babić; Bosnia and Herzegovina	1:51.77	Aram Davtyan; Armenia	1:51.95; PB
1500 m	Hayle Ibrahimov; Azerbaijan	3:46.77; NJR	Gezachw Yossef; Israel	3:48.06; SB	Darko Rosić; Bosnia and Herzegovina	3:53.02; PB
3000 m	Hayle Ibrahimov; Azerbaijan	8:08.13	Toft Munkholm Morten; Denmark	8:22.97; SB	Goran Stojiljković; Montenegro	8:24.06; SB
5000 m	Goran Stojiljković; Montenegro	14:36.48; SB	Tilahun Aliyev; Azerbaijan	14:38.08; NJR	Brihon Voba; Israel	14:41.62
3000 m steeplechase	Ion Luchianov; Moldova	8:50.69	Noam Ne'eman; Israel	9:14.43	Benjamin Wolthers; Denmark	9:20.55
110 m hurdles	David Ilariani; Georgia	14.02; SB	Adnan Malkić; Bosnia and Herzegovina	14.34	Jon Yde Bentsen; Denmark	14.43
400 m hurdles	Björgvin Víkingsson; Iceland	52.41	Jacques Frisch; Luxembourg	52.44	Alexei Cravcenco; Moldova	53.14
4 × 100 m	Valentin Bulichev; Ramil Quliyev; Ruslan Abbasov; Pavel Setin; Azerbaijan	39.78; NR	Martin Krabbe; Jesper Simonsen; Daniel B. Christensen; Nicklas Hyde; Denmark	40.31	Asaf Malka; Ram Mor; Tal Mor; Micky Bar-Yeoshua; Israel	40.64
4 × 400 m	Jakob Riis; Nicklas Hyde; Daniel B. Christensen; Andreas Bube; Denmark	3:09.09	German Florentz; Yuriy Shapsai; Tarass Shcherenko; Gil Shelleg; Israel	3:10.34; NR	Vadim Ryabikhin; Ibrahim Ahmadov; Pavel Setin; Valentin Bulichev; Azerbaijan	3:12.83
High jump	Dmitriy Kroyter; Israel	2.14	Janick Klausen; Denmark	2.08	Anton Balan; Moldova	2.08
Pole vault	Alex Averbukh; Israel	5.40	Goran Pejić; Bosnia and Herzegovina	4.70; PB	Andrei Fedotov; Moldova	4.50
Long jump	Vardan Pahlevanyan; Armenia	7.82; PB	Yochai Halevi; Israel	7.58	Borislav Skhirtladze; Georgia	7.43; SB
Triple jump	Teymur Abbasov; Azerbaijan	16.37	Yochai Halevi; Israel	16.34; PB	Vladimir Letnicov; Moldova	16.30
Shot put	Hamza Alić; Bosnia and Herzegovina	19.97	Ivan Emilianov; Moldova	18.31	Zurab Gigaia; Georgia	15.95; SB
Discus	Vadim Hranovschi; Moldova	58.58	Kemal Mešić; Bosnia and Herzegovina	50.56	Felix Gromadskiy; Israel	49.86
Hammer	Bergur Ingi Pétursson; Iceland	70.93	Torben Wolf; Denmark	63.95	Samir Vilić; Bosnia and Herzegovina	58.89; SB
Javelin	Dmitri Tarabin; Moldova	69.63; PB	Lars Møller Laursen; Denmark	68.38	Almir Kolašinac; Bosnia and Herzegovina	66.54
WR world record | AR area record | CR championship record | GR games record | NR national record | OR Olympic record | PB personal best | SB season best | WL world leading (in a given season)

=== Women's events ===
Event	Gold		Silver		Bronze	
100 m	Rita Pogorelov; Israel	12.15	Anna Olsson; Denmark	12.21	Anastasia Gherteva; Moldova	12.33
200 m	Sara Petersen; Denmark	24.34; PB	Rita Pogorelov; Israel	24.67	Anastasia Gherteva; Moldova	24.92
400 m	Jasna Horozic; Bosnia and Herzegovina	55.11	Olesea Cojuhari; Moldova	55.68; SB	Charline Mathias; Luxembourg	56.51; PB
800 m	Olesea Smovjenco; Moldova	2:09.79; SB	Layes Abdullayeva; Azerbaijan	2:11.21; PB	Vladana Gavranovic; Bosnia and Herzegovina	2:12.58; PB
1500 m	Gezashign Šafářová; Azerbaijan	4:26.14	Olesea Smovjenco; Moldova	4:29.72	Biljana Cvijanovic; Bosnia and Herzegovina	4:30.36; PB
3000 m	Mare Ibrahimova; Azerbaijan	9:27.05	Maria Stig Moeller; Denmark	9:38.59; PB	Valentina Delion; Moldova	10:06.39; SB
5000 m	Mare Ibrahimova; Azerbaijan	16:02.58; NR	Maria Stig Moeller; Denmark	16:16.81; PB	Natalia Cerches; Moldova	16:36.18
3000 m steeplechase	Layes Abdullayeva; Azerbaijan	10:40.59; NR	Laila Laursen; Denmark	10:52.09	Biljana Cvijanovic; Bosnia and Herzegovina	11:00.65
100 m hurdles	Irina Lenskiy; Israel	13.25	Anne Moller; Denmark	14.09	Gorana Cvijetic; Bosnia and Herzegovina	14.10; PB
400 m hurdles	Sara Petersen; Denmark	56.70; NR	Kim Reuland; Luxembourg	59.74; NR	Gorana Cvijetic; Bosnia and Herzegovina	1:01.32; SB
4 × 100 m	Rita Pogarelov; Irina Lensky; Rotem Batat; Olga Lensky; Israel	46.59	Anne Moller; Anna Olsson; Tine Ejlersen; Helena Scherer; Denmark	47.37	Linda Larusdottir; Helga Thorsteinssd; Hafdis Sigurdard; Hrafnhild Hermodsd; Iceland	47.46
4 × 400 m	Kathrina Mikkeyisen; Helena Sherer; Anna Olsson; Sara Petersen; Denmark	3:46.32	Chantal Hayen; Martine Nobili; Charlne Mathias; Kim Reuland; Luxembourg	3:46.69; NR	Olesea Cajuhaur; Anastasia Cherteve; Anna Bezfinferi; Valentina Dobzeu; Moldova	3:49.81
High jump	Ma'ayan Foreman; Israel	1.85	Marija Vuković; Montenegro	1.78	Liz Kuffer; Luxembourg	1.68
Pole vault	Caroline Bonde Holm; Denmark	4.15	Moran Azizi; Israel	3.80; SB	Hulda Thorsteinsdottir; Iceland	3.70
Long jump	Johanna Ingadottir; Iceland	6.09; PB	Rotem Batat; Israel	5.90; SB	Milena Milacevic; Montenegro	5.85; SB
Triple jump	Tatiana Cicanci; Moldova	13.10	Haykanush Beklaryan; Armenia	13.07; NR	Johanna Ingadottir; Iceland	12.84; PB
Shot put	Sivan Abali; Israel	14.67	Helga Ma Thorsteinsdottir; Iceland	13.78	Natalia Artic; Moldova	13.45
Discus	Natalia Artic; Moldova	49.58	Salome Rigishvili; Georgia	45.06; SB	Sivan Jean; Israel	44.83
Hammer	Zalina Marghieva; Moldova	68.26	Yevgeniya Zabolotniy; Israel	52.57	Pasa Sehic; Bosnia and Herzegovina	51.32
Javelin	Maria Jensen; Denmark	49.99; NJR	Valentina Croitori; Moldova	43.42	Noemie Pleimling; Luxembourg	42.77; PB
WR world record | AR area record | CR championship record | GR games record | NR national record | OR Olympic record | PB personal best | SB season best | WL world leading (in a given season)

=== Final standings ===
Pos	Country	Pts
1	Israel	401.5
2	Moldova	393.5
3	Denmark	391
4	Bosnia and Herzegovina	357
5	Azerbaijan	327.5
6	Iceland	327
7	Luxembourg	292
8	Armenia	245.5
9	Georgia	227
10	Montenegro	217.5
11	AASSE	135
12	Andorra	123
13	Macedonia	116.5

=== Records ===
Country	Name	Event	Results	Notes
Armenia	Kristine Harutyunyan	Women's Javelin	39.26	NR, NJR
Armenia	Haykanush Beklaryan	Women's Triple jump	13.07	NR, NJR
Azerbaijan		Men's 4 × 100 m	39.78	NR
Azerbaijan	Layes Abdullayeva	Women's 3000 m steeplechase	10:40.59	NR, NJR
Azerbaijan	Ulkar Ganbarova	Women's Pole Vault	2.80	NR
Azerbaijan	Hayle Ibrahimov	Men's 1500 m	3:46.77	NJR
Azerbaijan	Tilahun Aliyev	Men's 5000 m	14:38.08	NJR
Denmark	Sara Petersen	Women's 400 m hurdles	56.70	NR
Denmark	Maria L. Jensen	Women's Javelin	49.99	NJR
Georgia	Endrik Zilbershtein	Men's 200 m	21.94	NJR
Georgia	Endrik Zilbershtein	Men's 400 m	47.92	NJR
Israel		Men's 4 × 400 m	3:10.34	NR
Luxembourg	Kim Reuland	Women's 400 m hurdles	59.74	NR
Luxembourg		Men's 4 × 400 m	3:15.10	NR
Luxembourg		Women's 4 × 400 m	3:46.69	NR
San Marino	Martina Pretelli	Women's 400 m	60.17	NJR

=== Score table ===
Event		AASSE	AND	ARM	AZE	BIH	DEN	GEO	ISL	ISR	LUX	MKD	MDA	MNE
100 metres	M	7	1	10	13	12	11	3	5	8	6	2	9	4
100 metres	W	7	3	9	4	5	12	2	6	13	10	8	11	1
200 metres	M	4	3	6	13	12	9	10	8	11	5	1	7	2
200 metres	W	0	3	10	5	8	13	2	7	12	6	9	11	4
400 metres	M	0	2	7	5	10	13	11	8	12	6	3	9	4
400 metres	W	3	1	9	10	13	8	2	7	6	11	5	12	4
800 metres	M	3	1	11	6	12	8	10	4	7	13	2	9	5
800 metres	W	0	6	5	12	11	10	7	4	8	9	2	13	3
1500 metres	M	4	2	9	13	11	5	3	8	12	6	1	10	7
1500 metres	W	0	4	5	13	11	9	3	6	8	7	2	12	10
3000 metres	M	0	3	8	13	6	12	5	4	9	7	2	10	11
3000 metres	W	0	6	7	13	3	12	8	9	10	5	4	11	0
5000 metres	M	1	2	6	12	5	10	4	9	11	7	3	8	13
5000 metres	W	0	5	0	13	6	12	8	9	7	10	3	11	4
3000 metre steeplechase	M	0	7	8	5	10	11	6	9	12	0	3	13	4
3000 metre steeplechase	W	0	0	0	13	11	12	0	10	9	6	7	5	8
110 metre hurdles 100 metre hurdles	M	0	2	4	5	12	11	13	6	10	9	3	7	8
110 metre hurdles 100 metre hurdles	W	2	3	9	7	11	12	8	10	13	4	0	5	6
400 metre hurdles	M	2	1	4	9	6	7	8	13	10	12	3	11	5
400 metre hurdles	W	0	3	10	7	11	13	6	8	5	12	0	9	4
4 × 100 metres relay	M	5	2	4	13	8	12	7	10	11	6	3	9	0
4 × 100 metres relay	W	5	2	9	6	8	12	3	11	13	10	0	7	4
4 × 400 metres relay	M	3	1	5	11	6	13	7	8	12	10	2	9	4
4 × 400 metres relay	W	0	2	10	6	9	13	5	7	8	12	3	11	4
High jump	M	5.5	0	0	7	10	12	9	5.5	13	8	4	11	3
High jump	W	2	6	3	4.5	8	9	0	10.5	13	10.5	7	4.5	12
Pole vault	M	6.5	6.5	0	8	12	0	0	9	13	10	0	11	0
Pole vault	W	8	6	0	7	0	13	0	11	12	10	0	9	0
Long jump	M	6	3	13	1	9	2	11	10	12	5	4	8	7
Long jump	W	9	3	8	5	7	6	4	13	12	1	2	10	11
Triple jump	M	5	2	9	13	3	10	7	8	12	0	6	11	4
Triple jump	W	2	6	12	9	8	5	3	11	10	4	1	13	7
Shot put	M	3	2	4	8	13	0	11	9	6	7	5	12	10
Shot put	W	0	2	5	4	10	8	9	12	13	7	3	11	6
Discus throw	M	0	2	4	8	12	10	6	9	11	5	3	13	7
Discus throw	W	7	3	5	8	10	9	12	0	11	6	0	13	4
Hammer throw	M	8	4	9	5	11	12	0	13	10	0	6	0	7
Hammer throw	W	4	7	0	3	11	9	5	10	12	8	0	13	6
Javelin throw	M	7	4	0	3	11	12	9	0	8	10	6	13	5
Javelin throw	W	4	2	8	7	6	13	0	10	9	11	3	12	5
Country		AASSE	AND	ARM	AZE	BIH	DEN	GEO	ISL	ISR	LUX	MKD	MDA	MNE
Total		123	123.5	245	327.5	358	390	227	327	414	291.5	121	393.5	245
