= 2009 World Championships in Athletics – Men's 4 × 100 metres relay =

The men's 4 × 100 metres relay at the 2009 World Championships in Athletics took place at the Olympic Stadium in Berlin on August 21 and August 22. The two main contenders for the event were the reigning World Champions, the United States, and the reigning Olympic Champions, Jamaica. Jamaica held the world record at 37.10 (which was later rescinded), which was established at the 2008 Summer Olympics in Beijing, while the United States entered with the 2009 overall season-best 37.85.

== Medalists ==
Gold	Silver	Bronze
Jamaica; Steve Mullings; Michael Frater; Usain Bolt; Asafa Powell; Dwight Thomas*; Lerone Clarke*	Trinidad and Tobago; Darrel Brown; Marc Burns; Emmanuel Callander; Richard Thompson; Keston Bledman*	Great Britain & N.I. Simeon Williamson; Tyrone Edgar; Marlon Devonish; Harry Aikines-Aryeetey

* Runners who participated in the heats only and received medals.

== Records ==
Prior to the competition, the following records were as follows.

World record	United States (USA); Jon Drummond, Andre Cason, Dennis Mitchell, Leroy Burrell	37.40	Stuttgart, Germany	21 August 1993
Championship record	United States (USA); Jon Drummond, Andre Cason, Dennis Mitchell, Leroy Burrell	37.40	Stuttgart, Germany	21 August 1993
World Leading	Racers Track Club; Daniel Bailey, Yohan Blake, Mario Forsythe, Usain Bolt	37.46	London, Great Britain	25 July 2009
African Record	Nigeria (NGR); Osmond Ezinwa, Olapade Adeniken, Francis Obikwelu, Davidson Ezinwa	37.94	Athens, Greece	9 August 1997
Asian Record	Japan (JPN); Naoki Tsukahara, Shingo Suetsugu, Shinji Takahira, Nobuharu Asahara	38.03	Osaka, Japan	1 September 2007
North American Record	United States (USA); Jon Drummond, Andre Cason, Dennis Mitchell, Leroy Burrell	37.40	Stuttgart, Germany	21 August 1993
South American record	Brazil (BRA); André da Silva, Claudinei da Silva, Vicente de Lima, Édson Ribeiro	37.90	Sydney, Australia	30 September 2000
European Record	Great Britain (GBR); Dwain Chambers, Jason Gardener, Darren Campbell, Marlon Devonish	37.73	Seville, Spain	29 August 1999
Oceanian Record	Australia (AUS); Paul Henderson, Tim Jackson, Steve Brimacombe, Damien Marsh	38.17	Gothenburg, Sweden	12 August 1995

No new world or championship record was set during this competition.

== Qualification standard ==
Standard
39.10

== Schedule ==
Date	Time	Round
August 21, 2009	19:30	Heats
August 22, 2009	20:50	Final

== Results ==
=== Heats ===
The first 2 of each heat (Q) plus the 2 fastest times (q) qualify.

Rank	Heat	Nation	Athletes	Time	Notes
1	2	Great Britain & N.I.	Simeon Williamson, Tyrone Edgar, Marlon Devonish, Harry Aikines-Aryeetey	38.11	Q, SB
2	1	Trinidad and Tobago	Darrel Brown, Marc Burns, Keston Bledman, Richard Thompson	38.47	Q
3	3	Italy	Roberto Donati, Simone Collio, Emanuele Di Gregorio, Fabio Cerutti	38.52	Q, SB
4	1	Japan	Masashi Eriguchi, Naoki Tsukahara, Shinji Takahira, Kenji Fujimitsu	38.53	Q
5	1	France	Ronald Pognon, Martial Mbandjock, Pierre-Alexis Pessonneaux, Christophe Lemaitre	38.59	q, SB
6	2	Canada	Hank Palmer, Oluseyi Smith, Jared Connaughton, Bryan Barnett	38.60	Q, SB
6	3	Jamaica	Lerone Clarke, Michael Frater, Steve Mullings, Dwight Thomas	38.60	Q
8	1	Brazil	Vicente de Lima, Sandro Viana, Basílio de Moraes, José Carlos Moreira	38.72	q, SB
9	3	Australia	Anthony Alozie, Josh Ross, Aaron Rouge-Serret, Matt Davies	38.93	SB
10	2	Netherlands	Gregory Sedoc, Caimin Douglas, Guus Hoogmoed, Patrick van Luijk	38.95	SB
11	2	Portugal	Dany Gonçalves, Arnaldo Abrantes, Ricardo Monteiro, Francis Obikwelu	39.25	
12	1	Switzerland	Pascal Mancini, Marc Schneeberger, Reto Schenkel, Marco Cribari	39.47	
13	2	Ghana	Nana Kofi Samm, Tanko Braimah, Seth Amoo, Aziz Zakari	39.61	SB
14	1	South Africa	Hannes Dreyer, Leigh Julius, Thuso Mpuang, L. J. van Zyl	39.71	
15	3	Thailand	Apinan Sukaphai, Wachara Sondee, Suppachai Chimdee, Sittichai Suwonprateep	39.73	
	2	United States	Terrence Trammell, Michael Rodgers, Shawn Crawford, Darvis Patton	DQ	Illegal handover
	3	Germany	Tobias Unger, Marius Broening, Alexander Kosenkow, Martin Keller	DNF	
	3	Poland	Michał Bielczyk, Dariusz Kuć, Mikołaj Lewański, Robert Kubaczyk	DNS	

Key: DNF = Did not finish, DNS = Did not start, DQ = Disqualified, Q = qualification by place in heat, q = qualification by overall place, SB = Seasonal best

=== Final ===
Rank	Nation	Athletes	Time	Notes
1st place, gold medalist(s)	Jamaica	Steve Mullings, Michael Frater, Usain Bolt, Asafa Powell	37.31	WR
2nd place, silver medalist(s)	Trinidad and Tobago	Darrel Brown, Marc Burns, Emmanuel Callander, Richard Thompson	37.62	NR
3rd place, bronze medalist(s)	Great Britain & N.I.	Simeon Williamson, Tyrone Edgar, Marlon Devonish, Harry Aikines-Aryeetey	38.02	SB
4	Japan	Masashi Eriguchi, Naoki Tsukahara, Shinji Takahira, Kenji Fujimitsu	38.30	SB
5	Canada	Sam Effah, Oluseyi Smith, Jared Connaughton, Bryan Barnett	38.39	SB
6	Italy	Roberto Donati, Simone Collio, Emanuele Di Gregorio, Fabio Cerutti	38.54	
7	Brazil	Vicente de Lima, Sandro Viana, Basílio de Moraes, José Carlos Moreira	38.56	SB
8	France	Ronald Pognon, Martial Mbandjock, Eddy De Lepine, Christophe Lemaitre	39.21	

Key: CR = Championship record, NR = National record, SB = Seasonal best
