= 2010 European Athletics Championships – Men's 100 metres =

Men's 100 metres at the 2010 European Athletics Championships
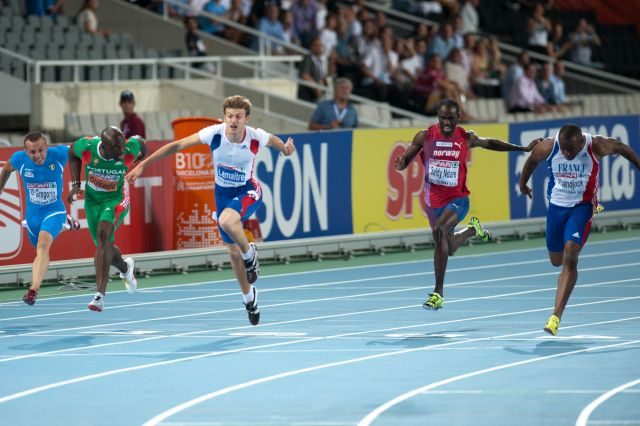
- Christophe Lemaitre winning the 100 m final.
- Venue: Estadi Olímpic Lluís Companys
- Location: Barcelona
- Dates: 27 July (heats); 28 July (semifinals & final)
- Competitors: 36 from 24 nations
- Winning time: 10.11

Medalists
gold medal	Christophe Lemaitre	France
silver medal	Mark Lewis-Francis	Great Britain
bronze medal	Martial Mbandjock	France

The men's 100 metres at the 2010 European Athletics Championships was held at the Estadi Olímpic Lluís Companys on 27 and 28 July.

== Records ==
Standing records prior to the 2010 European Athletics Championships
World record	Usain Bolt (JAM)	9.58	Berlin, Germany	16 August 2009
European record	Francis Obikwelu (POR)	9.86	Athens, Greece	22 August 2004
Championship record	Francis Obikwelu (POR)	9.99	Gothenburg, Sweden	8 August 2006
World Leading	Asafa Powell (JAM); Usain Bolt (JAM)	9.82	Rome, Italy; Lausanne, Switzerland	10 June 2010; 8 July 2010
European Leading	Christophe Lemaitre (FRA)	9.98	Valence, France	9 July 2010

== Schedule ==
Date	Time	Round
27 July 2010	19:15	Round 1
28 July 2010	19:50	Semifinals
28 July 2010	21:45	Final

== Results ==
=== Round 1 ===
First 4 in each heat (Q) and 4 best performers (q) advance to the Semifinals.

==== Heat 1 ====
Rank	Lane	Name	Nationality	React	Time	Notes
1	2	Dwain Chambers	Great Britain & N.I.	0.177	10.21	Q
2	6	Ronald Pognon	France	0.173	10.46	Q
3	8	Robert Kubaczyk	Poland	0.166	10.51	Q
4	4	Ronalds Arājs	Latvia	0.175	10.52	Q
5	7	Jesper Simonsen	Denmark	0.158	10.62	
6	3	Tom Kling-Baptiste	Sweden	0.154	10.64	
7	5	Jan Veleba	Czech Republic	0.178	10.68	
				Wind: -1.5 m/s		

==== Heat 2 ====
Rank	Lane	Name	Nationality	React	Time	Notes
1	6	Martial Mbandjock	France	0.162	10.26	Q
2	4	Emanuele Di Gregorio	Italy	0.166	10.31	Q
3	8	Matic Osovnikar	Slovenia	0.157	10.36	Q, SB
4	2	Alexander Kosenkow	Germany	0.161	10.44	Q
5	7	Dmitriy Glushchenko	Israel	0.184	10.44	q, SB
6	3	Ángel David Rodríguez	Spain	0.189	10.45	q
7	5	Panayiotis Ioannou	Cyprus	0.174	10.61	
				Wind: -1.2 m/s		

==== Heat 3 ====
Rank	Lane	Name	Nationality	React	Time	Notes
1	1	Francis Obikwelu	Portugal	0.176	10.27	Q
2	8	Tobias Unger	Germany	0.168	10.35	Q
3	3	Simone Collio	Italy	0.191	10.43	Q
4	4	Hannu Hämäläinen	Finland	0.158	10.49	Q
5	5	Paweł Stempel	Poland	0.207	10.58	q
6	2	Mario Bonello	Malta	0.184	11.09	
7	6	Nedim Čović	Bosnia and Herzegovina	0.168	34.89	
	7	Dominic Carroll	Gibraltar		DQ	F^{1}
				Wind: -0.8 m/s		

==== Heat 4 ====
Rank	Lane	Name	Nationality	React	Time	Notes
1	3	Jaysuma Saidy Ndure	Norway	0.149	10.31	Q
2	2	Ryan Moseley	Austria	0.154	10.38	Q
3	7	James Dasaolu	Great Britain & N.I.	0.231	10.40	Q
4	4	Christian Blum	Germany	0.161	10.57	Q
5	6	Joni Rautanen	Finland	0.188	10.63	
6	5	Gregor Kokalovič	Slovenia	0.174	10.68	
7	8	Arman Andreasyan	Armenia	0.256	11.01	
				Wind: -1.6 m/s		

==== Heat 5 ====
Rank	Lane	Name	Nationality	React	Time	Notes
1	4	Christophe Lemaitre	France	0.169	10.19	Q
2	3	Mark Lewis-Francis	Great Britain & N.I.	0.201	10.23	Q
3	7	Fabio Cerutti	Italy	0.160	10.38	Q
4	8	Jason Smyth	Ireland	0.165	10.43	Q
5	6	Dariusz Kuć	Poland	0.158	10.53	q
6	2	Mikhail Idrisov	Russia	0.162	10.62	
7	5	İzzet Safer	Turkey	0.165	10.68	
				Wind: -1.4 m/s		

==== Summary ====
Rank	Heat	Lane	Name	Nationality	React	Time	Note
1	5	4	Christophe Lemaitre	France	0.169	10.19	Q
2	1	2	Dwain Chambers	Great Britain & N.I.	0.177	10.21	Q
3	5	3	Mark Lewis-Francis	Great Britain & N.I.	0.201	10.23	Q
4	2	6	Martial Mbandjock	France	0.162	10.26	Q
5	3	1	Francis Obikwelu	Portugal	0.176	10.27	Q
6	2	4	Emanuele Di Gregorio	Italy	0.166	10.31	Q
6	4	3	Jaysuma Saidy Ndure	Norway	0.149	10.31	Q
8	3	8	Tobias Unger	Germany	0.168	10.35	Q
9	2	8	Matic Osovnikar	Slovenia	0.157	10.36	Q, SB
10	5	7	Fabio Cerutti	Italy	0.160	10.38	Q
10	4	2	Ryan Moseley	Austria	0.154	10.38	Q
12	4	7	James Dasaolu	Great Britain & N.I.	0.231	10.40	Q
13	3	3	Simone Collio	Italy	0.191	10.43	Q
13	5	8	Jason Smyth	Ireland	0.165	10.43	Q
15	2	2	Alexander Kosenkow	Germany	0.161	10.44	Q
16	2	7	Dmitriy Glushchenko	Israel	0.184	10.44	q, SB
17	2	3	Ángel David Rodríguez	Spain	0.189	10.45	q
18	1	6	Ronald Pognon	France	0.173	10.46	Q
19	3	4	Hannu Hämäläinen	Finland	0.158	10.49	Q
20	1	8	Robert Kubaczyk	Poland	0.166	10.51	Q
21	1	4	Ronalds Arājs	Latvia	0.175	10.52	Q
22	5	6	Dariusz Kuć	Poland	0.158	10.53	q
23	4	4	Christian Blum	Germany	0.161	10.57	Q
24	3	5	Paweł Stempel	Poland	0.207	10.58	q
25	2	5	Panayiotis Ioannou	Cyprus	0.174	10.61	
26	5	2	Mikhail Idrisov	Russia	0.162	10.62	
26	1	7	Jesper Simonsen	Denmark	0.158	10.62	
28	4	6	Joni Rautanen	Finland	0.188	10.63	
29	1	3	Tom Kling-Baptiste	Sweden	0.154	10.64	
30	4	5	Gregor Kokalovič	Slovenia	0.174	10.68	
30	5	5	İzzet Safer	Turkey	0.165	10.68	
30	1	5	Jan Veleba	Czech Republic	0.178	10.68	
33	4	8	Arman Andreasyan	Armenia	0.256	11.01	
34	3	2	Mario Bonello	Malta	0.184	11.09	
35	3	6	Nedim Čović	Bosnia and Herzegovina	0.168	34.89	
	3	7	Dominic Carroll	Gibraltar		DQ	F^{1}

=== Semifinals ===
First 2 in each heat and 2 best performers advance to the Final.

==== Semifinal 1 ====
Rank	Lane	Name	Nationality	React	Time	Notes
1	5	Christophe Lemaitre	France	0.175	10.06	Q
2	6	Emanuele Di Gregorio	Italy	0.168	10.17	Q, PB
3	4	Mark Lewis-Francis	Great Britain & N.I.	0.176	10.21	q, =SB
4	7	Jason Smyth	Ireland	0.159	10.46	
5	1	Ronalds Arājs	Latvia	0.153	10.47	
6	8	Hannu Hämäläinen	Finland	0.158	10.47	
7	3	Tobias Unger	Germany	0.158	10.52	
8	2	Paweł Stempel	Poland	0.178	10.53	
				Wind: -1.2 m/s		

==== Semifinal 2 ====
Rank	Lane	Name	Nationality	React	Time	Notes
1	5	Dwain Chambers	Great Britain & N.I.	0.163	10.10	Q
2	4	Jaysuma Saidy Ndure	Norway	0.179	10.16	Q
3	7	Simone Collio	Italy	0.164	10.23	q
4	3	Ryan Moseley	Austria	0.161	10.27	
5	8	Alexander Kosenkow	Germany	0.170	10.38	
6	6	Ronald Pognon	France	0.147	10.43	
7	2	Dmitriy Glushchenko	Israel	0.193	10.50	
8	1	Dariusz Kuć	Poland	0.208	10.65	
				Wind: -0.1 m/s		

==== Semifinal 3 ====
Rank	Lane	Name	Nationality	React	Time	Notes
1	5	Martial Mbandjock	France	0.161	10.19	Q
2	4	Francis Obikwelu	Portugal	0.172	10.25	Q
3	8	James Dasaolu	Great Britain & N.I.	0.224	10.31	
4	6	Fabio Cerutti	Italy	0.158	10.33	
5	3	Matic Osovnikar	Slovenia	0.173	10.51	
6	1	Ángel David Rodríguez	Spain	0.173	10.51	
7	7	Robert Kubaczyk	Poland	0.160	10.55	
8	2	Christian Blum	Germany	0.154	10.69	
				Wind: -1.0 m/s		

==== Summary ====
Rank	Semifinal	Lane	Name	Nationality	React	Time	Note
1	1	5	Christophe Lemaitre	France		10.06	Q
2	2	5	Dwain Chambers	Great Britain & N.I.		10.10	Q
3	2	4	Jaysuma Saidy Ndure	Norway		10.16	Q
4	1	6	Emanuele Di Gregorio	Italy		10.17	Q, PB
5	3	5	Martial Mbandjock	France		10.19	Q
6	1	4	Mark Lewis-Francis	Great Britain & N.I.		10.21	q, =SB
7	2	7	Simone Collio	Italy		10.23	q
8	3	4	Francis Obikwelu	Portugal		10.25	Q
9	2	3	Ryan Moseley	Austria		10.27	
10	3	8	James Dasaolu	Great Britain & N.I.		10.31	
11	3	6	Fabio Cerutti	Italy		10.33	
12	2	8	Alexander Kosenkow	Germany		10.38	
13	2	6	Ronald Pognon	France		10.43	
14	1	7	Jason Smyth	Ireland		10.46	
15	1	1	Ronalds Arājs	Latvia		10.47	
16	1	8	Hannu Hämäläinen	Finland		10.47	
17	2	2	Dmitriy Glushchenko	Israel		10.50	
18	3	3	Matic Osovnikar	Slovenia		10.51	
19	3	1	Ángel David Rodríguez	Spain		10.51	
20	1	3	Tobias Unger	Germany		10.52	
21	1	2	Paweł Stempel	Poland		10.53	
22	3	7	Robert Kubaczyk	Poland		10.55	
23	2	1	Dariusz Kuć	Poland		10.65	
24	3	2	Christian Blum	Germany		10.69	

=== Final ===
Rank	Lane	Athlete	Nationality	React	Time	Notes
1st place, gold medalist(s)	6	Christophe Lemaitre	France	0.224	10.11	
2nd place, silver medalist(s)	2	Mark Lewis-Francis	Great Britain & N.I.	0.164	10.18	SB
3rd place, bronze medalist(s)	4	Martial Mbandjock	France	0.168	10.18	
4	7	Francis Obikwelu	Portugal	0.171	10.18	SB
5	3	Dwain Chambers	Great Britain & N.I.	0.154	10.18	
6	5	Jaysuma Saidy Ndure	Norway	0.186	10.31	
7	8	Emanuele Di Gregorio	Italy	0.223	10.34	
	1	Simone Collio	Italy	0.150	DNF	
				Wind: −1.0 m/s		
