= 2009 European Athletics Indoor Championships – Men's 60 metres =

The Men's 60 metres event at the 2009 European Athletics Indoor Championships was held on March 7–8.

== Medalists ==
Gold	Silver	Bronze
Dwain Chambers; Great Britain	Fabio Cerutti; Italy	Emanuele Di Gregorio; Italy

== Results ==
=== Heats ===
First 2 of each heat (Q) and the next 6 fastest (q) qualified for the semifinals.

Rank	Heat	Name	Nationality	Time	Notes
1	3	Dwain Chambers	Great Britain	6.53	Q
2	2	Emanuele Di Gregorio	Italy	6.60	Q, =PB
3	4	Simeon Williamson	Great Britain	6.61	Q
4	5	Fabio Cerutti	Italy	6.62	Q
5	1	Craig Pickering	Great Britain	6.63	Q
6	2	Stefan Schwab	Germany	6.64	Q
7	5	Dariusz Kuć	Poland	6.67	Q
8	5	Pascal Mancini	Switzerland	6.67	q, NJR
9	4	Ryan Moseley	Austria	6.68	Q
9	5	Joni Rautanen	Finland	6.68	q, =PB
11	4	Jarkko Ruostekivi	Finland	6.70	q
12	4	Paul Hession	Ireland	6.70	q
13	1	Iván Mocholí	Spain	6.71	Q
13	2	Ramil Guliyev	Azerbaijan	6.71	q
13	2	Igor Bodrov	Ukraine	6.71	q
13	3	Christophe Lemaitre	France	6.71	Q
17	1	Simone Collio	Italy	6.72	
18	1	Patrick van Luijk	Netherlands	6.72	
19	3	Ángel David Rodríguez	Spain	6.73	
20	4	Matic Osovnikar	Slovenia	6.74	
21	2	İsmail Aslan	Turkey	6.77	
22	3	Arnaldo Abrantes	Portugal	6.78	
23	2	Mikhail Idrisov	Russia	6.80	
23	3	Veselin Pankov	Bulgaria	6.80	
25	1	Panayiotis Ioannou	Cyprus	6.81	
25	3	Jacek Roszko	Poland	6.81	
25	5	Libor Žilka	Czech Republic	6.81	
28	5	Martin Krabbe	Denmark	6.86	
29	1	Catalin Cîmpeanu	Romania	6.88	
30	4	Martynas Jurgilas	Lithuania	6.91	
31	5	Alberto Gavaldá	Spain	7.00	
32	2	Sébastien Gattuso	Monaco	7.03	SB
33	3	Asaf Malka	Israel	7.04	PB
34	4	Dominic Carroll	Gibraltar	7.34	NR

=== Semifinals ===
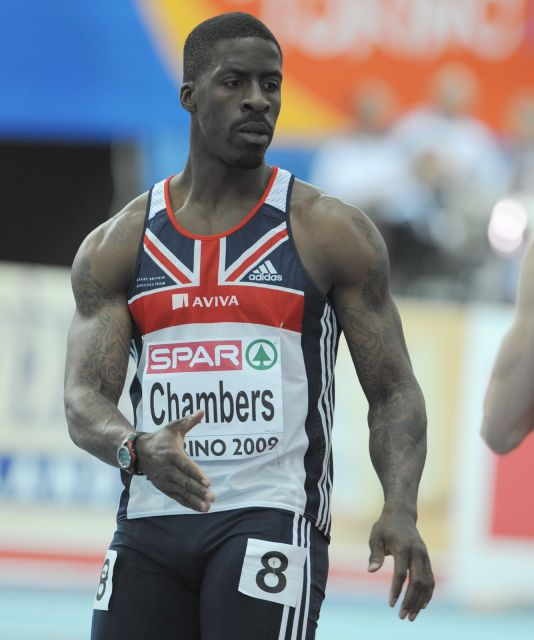
Dwain Chambers of Great Britain broke the European record in the semifinals and later won the gold medal.

First 4 of each semifinals qualified directly (Q) for the final.

Rank	Heat	Name	Nationality	Time	Notes
1	2	Dwain Chambers	Great Britain	6.42	Q, AR, CR
2	1	Simeon Williamson	Great Britain	6.57	Q
3	2	Fabio Cerutti	Italy	6.60	Q
4	1	Emanuele Di Gregorio	Italy	6.63	Q
4	2	Craig Pickering	Great Britain	6.63	Q
4	2	Ryan Moseley	Austria	6.63	Q, =PB
7	1	Dariusz Kuć	Poland	6.65	Q
8	1	Ramil Guliyev	Azerbaijan	6.66	Q, NJR
9	2	Paul Hession	Ireland	6.66	SB
10	1	Stefan Schwab	Germany	6.68	
11	2	Igor Bodrov	Ukraine	6.69	
12	1	Pascal Mancini	Switzerland	6.71	
12	2	Joni Rautanen	Finland	6.71	
14	1	Christophe Lemaitre	France	6.72	
15	2	Iván Mocholí	Spain	6.77	
16	1	Jarkko Ruostekivi	Finland	6.79	

=== Final ===
Rank	Lane	Name	Nationality	React	Time	Notes
1st place, gold medalist(s)	3	Dwain Chambers	Great Britain	0.149	6.46	
2nd place, silver medalist(s)	6	Fabio Cerutti	Italy	0.149	6.56	
3rd place, bronze medalist(s)	4	Emanuele Di Gregorio	Italy	0.139	6.56	PB
4	5	Simeon Williamson	Great Britain	0.164	6.57	
5	7	Craig Pickering	Great Britain	0.173	6.61	
6	8	Dariusz Kuć	Poland	0.173	6.62	
7	1	Ramil Guliyev	Azerbaijan	0.156	6.67	
8	2	Ryan Moseley	Austria	0.139	6.69	
