= 2010 European Athletics Championships – Men's 4 × 100 metres relay =

Men's 4 × 100 metres relay at the European Athletics Championships

The men's 4 × 100 metres relay at the 2010 European Athletics Championships was held at the Estadi Olímpic Lluís Companys on 31 July and 1 August.

Shortly after heat 2, it seemed that three teams (France, Poland and Switzerland) would qualify from heat 1, and five teams (Germany, Italy, Portugal, Russia and Spain) from heat 2, including Italy that finished second. However, it was announced that Italian team was disqualified, and subsequently Finnish team qualified from heat 1 to final. Later on, Italy made successful protest against Russia, so that Russia was disqualified and Italy proceeded to final.

== Medalists ==
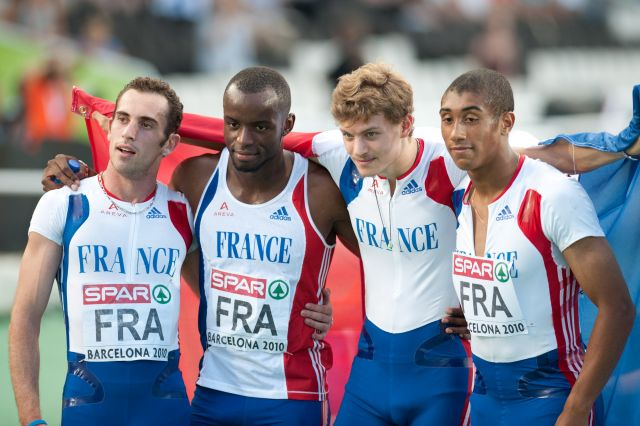
The French team won, with both Lemaitre and Mbandjock taking their third medal of the championships

Gold	Christophe Lemaitre, Jimmy Vicaut, Pierre-Alexis Pessonneaux, Martial Mbandjock; France (FRA)
Silver	Roberto Donati, Simone Collio, Emanuele di Gregorio, Maurizio Checcucci; Italy (ITA)
Bronze	Tobias Unger, Marius Broening, Alexander Kosenkow, Martin Keller; Germany (GER)

== Records ==
Standing records prior to the 2010 European Athletics Championships
World record	Jamaica; Nesta Carter, Michael Frater; Usain Bolt, Asafa Powell	37.10	Beijing, China	22 August 2008
European record	United Kingdom; Jason Gardener, Darren Campbell; Marlon Devonish, Dwain Chambers	37.73	Seville, Spain	29 August 1999
Championship record	France; Max Moriniere, Daniel Sangouma; Jean-Charles Trouabal, Bruno Marie-Rose	37.79	Split, Yugoslavia	1 September 1990
World Leading	Jamaica; Mario Forsythe, Yohan Blake; Marvin Anderson, Usain Bolt	37.90	Philadelphia, PA, United States	24 April 2010
European Leading	France; Ronald Pognon, Christophe Lemaitre; Yannick Lesourd, Martial Mbandjock	38.50	Rome, Italy	10 June 2010
Broken records during the 2010 European Athletics Championships
European Leading	France; Jimmy Vicaut, Christophe Lemaitre; Pierre-Alexis Pessonneaux, Martial Mbandjock	38.11	Barcelona, Spain	1 August 2010

== Schedule ==
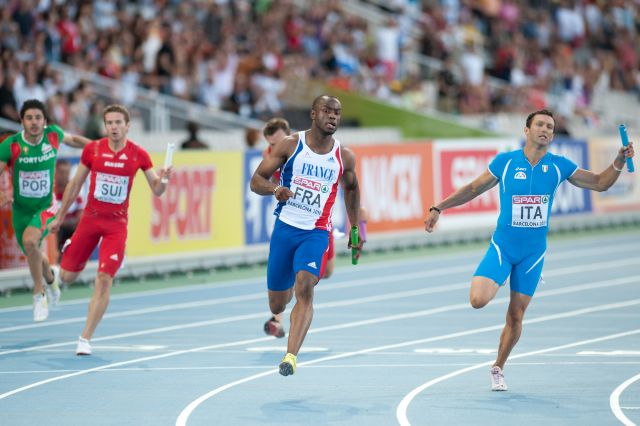
The French and Italian teams remained close throughout the race.

Date	Time	Round
31 July 2010	10:15	Round 1
1 August 2010	19:35	Final

== Results ==
=== Round 1 ===
First 3 in each heat (Q) and 2 best performers (q) advance to the Final.

==== Heat 1 ====
Rank	Lane	Nation	Athletes	React	Time	Notes
1	3	France	Imaad Hallay, Jimmy Vicaut, Pierre-Alexis Pessonneaux, Martial Mbandjock	0.168	39.12	Q
2	4	Poland	Dariusz Kuć, Paweł Stempel, Robert Kubaczyk, Kamil Kryński	0.173	39.20	Q
3	7	Switzerland	Pascal Mancini, Aron Beyene, Reto Schenkel, Marc Schneeberger	0.172	39.22	Q
4	6	Finland	Hannu Ali-Huokuna, Joni Rautanen, Jonathan Åstrand, Hannu Hämäläinen	0.143	39.40	q
5	5	Great Britain & N.I.	Leon Baptiste, Craig Pickering, Marlon Devonish, Mark Lewis-Francis	0.180	39.49	
6	8	Norway	Philip Bjørnå Berntsen, Tormod Hjortnæs Larsen, Christian Settemsli Mogstad, Jaysuma Saidy Ndure	0.162	40.04	
7	2	Turkey	Mustafa Delioğlu, Sezai Özkaya, Hakan Karacaoğlu, İzzet Safer	0.254	40.23	

==== Heat 2 ====
Rank	Lane	Nation	Athletes	React	Time	Notes
1	6	Germany	Tobias Unger, Marius Broening, Alexander Kosenkow, Martin Keller	0.174	38.75	Q
2	3	Italy	Roberto Donati, Simone Collio, Emanuele di Gregorio, Maurizio Checcucci	0.199	38.82	Q
3	4	Portugal	Ricardo Monteiro, Francis Obikwelu, Arnaldo Abrantes, Yazaldes Nascimento	0.201	39.09	Q
4	7	Spain	Alain López, Ángel David Rodríguez, Orkatz Beitia, Rubén Pros	0.230	39.30	q
	2	Russia	Mikhail Idrisov, Ivan Teplykh, Roman Smirnov, Vyacheslav Kolesnichenko	0.173	DQ	
	5	Slovenia	Jan Žumer, Matic Osovnikar, Boštjan Fridrih, Gregor Kokalovič	0.165	DQ	

==== Summary ====
Rank	Heat	Lane	Nation	Athletes	React	Time	Notes
1	2	6	Germany	Tobias Unger, Marius Broening, Alexander Kosenkow, Martin Keller	0.174	38.75	Q
2	2	3	Italy	Roberto Donati, Simone Collio, Emanuele di Gregorio, Maurizio Checcucci	0.199	38.82	Q
3	2	4	Portugal	Ricardo Monteiro, Francis Obikwelu, Arnaldo Abrantes, Yazaldes Nascimento	0.201	39.09	Q
4	1	3	France	Imaad Hallay, Jimmy Vicaut, Pierre-Alexis Pessonneaux, Martial Mbandjock	0.168	39.12	Q
5	1	4	Poland	Dariusz Kuć, Paweł Stempel, Robert Kubaczyk, Kamil Kryński	0.173	39.20	Q
6	1	7	Switzerland	Pascal Mancini, Aron Beyene, Reto Schenkel, Marc Schneeberger	0.172	39.22	Q
7	2	7	Spain	Alain López, Ángel David Rodríguez, Orkatz Beitia, Rubén Pros	0.230	39.30	q
8	1	6	Finland	Hannu Ali-Huokuna, Joni Rautanen, Jonathan Åstrand, Hannu Hämäläinen	0.143	39.40	q
9	1	5	Great Britain & N.I.	Leon Baptiste, Craig Pickering, Marlon Devonish, Mark Lewis-Francis	0.180	39.49	
10	1	8	Norway	Philip Bjørnå Berntsen, Tormod Hjortnæs Larsen, Christian Settemsli Mogstad, Jaysuma Saidy Ndure	0.162	40.04	
11	1	2	Turkey	Mustafa Delioğlu, Sezai Özkaya, Hakan Karacaoğlu, İzzet Safer	0.254	40.23	
	2	2	Russia	Mikhail Idrisov, Ivan Teplykh, Roman Smirnov, Vyacheslav Kolesnichenko	0.173	DQ	
	2	5	Slovenia	Jan Žumer, Matic Osovnikar, Boštjan Fridrih, Gregor Kokalovič	0.165	DQ	

=== Final ===
Rank	Lane	Nationality	Athlete	React	Time	Notes
1st place, gold medalist(s)	3	France	Jimmy Vicaut, Christophe Lemaitre, Pierre-Alexis Pessonneaux, Martial Mbandjock	0.275	38.11	EL
2nd place, silver medalist(s)	7	Italy	Roberto Donati, Simone Collio, Emanuele di Gregorio, Maurizio Checcucci	0.241	38.17	NR
3rd place, bronze medalist(s)	5	Germany	Tobias Unger, Marius Broening, Alexander Kosenkow, Martin Keller	0.184	38.44	
4	8	Switzerland	Pascal Mancini, Aron Beyene, Reto Schenkel, Marc Schneeberger	0.162	38.69	NR
5	4	Poland	Dariusz Kuć, Paweł Stempel, Robert Kubaczyk, Kamil Kryński	0.189	38.83	
6	6	Portugal	Ricardo Monteiro, Francis Obikwelu, Arnaldo Abrantes, João Ferreira	0.218	38.88	NR
7	1	Finland	Hannu Ali-Huokuna, Joni Rautanen, Jonathan Åstrand, Hannu Hämäläinen	0.149	39.29	NR
	2	Spain	Alain López, Ángel David Rodríguez, Orkatz Beitia, Rubén Pros	0.149	DNF	
