= 2010 European Athletics Championships – Men's 200 metres =

At the Estadi Olímpic Lluís Companys

Men's 200 metres at the 2010 European Athletics Championships
- Venue: Estadi Olímpic Lluís Companys
- Location: Barcelona
- Dates: 29 July (heats & semi-finals); 30 July (final)
- Competitors: 32 from 21 nations
- Winning time: 20.37

Medalists
gold medal	Christophe Lemaitre	France
silver medal	Christian Malcolm	Great Britain
bronze medal	Martial Mbandjock	France

The men's 200 metres at the 2010 European Athletics Championships was held at the Estadi Olímpic Lluís Companys on 29 and 30 July.

== Records ==
Standing records prior to the 2010 European Athletics Championships
World record	Usain Bolt (JAM)	19.19	Berlin, Germany	20 August 2009
European record	Pietro Mennea (ITA)	19.72	Mexico City, Mexico	12 September 1979
Championship record	Konstantinos Kenteris (GRE)	19.85	Munich, Germany	9 August 2002
World Leading	Usain Bolt (JAM)	19.56	Kingston, Jamaica	1 May 2010
European Leading	Christophe Lemaître (FRA)	20.16	Valence, France	10 July 2010

== Schedule ==
Date	Time	Round
29 July 2010	11:30	Round 1
29 July 2010	19:55	Semi-finals
30 July 2010	19:25	Final

== Results ==
=== Round 1 ===
First 3 in each heat (Q) and 4 best performers (q) advance to the Semifinals.

==== Heat 1 ====
Rank	Lane	Athlete	Nation	Time	Notes
1	6	Christian Malcolm	Great Britain & N.I.	20.63	Q
2	3	Kamil Kryński	Poland	20.81	Q, =PB
3	4	Martial Mbandjock	France	20.83	Q
4	5	Ihor Bodrov	Ukraine	20.98	
5	8	Jiří Vojtík	Czech Republic	21.02	
6	7	Jan Žumer	Slovenia	21.17	
7	2	Izzet Safer	Turkey	21.41	
8	1	Yordan Ilinov	Bulgaria	21.65	
				Wind: -1.6 m/s	

==== Heat 2 ====
Rank	Lane	Athlete	Nation	Time	Notes
1	7	Christophe Lemaitre	France	20.64	Q
2	8	Arnaldo Abrantes	Portugal	20.87	Q
3	2	Jeffrey Lawal-Balogun	Great Britain & N.I.	20.93	Q
4	4	Daniel Schnelting	Germany	20.98	
5	6	Petr Szetei	Czech Republic	21.06	
6	1	Ryan Moseley	Austria	21.07	
7	5	Matic Osovnikar	Slovenia	21.36	=SB
8	3	Alex Wilson	Switzerland	21.40	
				Wind: 0.0 m/s	

==== Heat 3 ====
Rank	Lane	Athlete	Nation	Time	Notes
1	2	Jaysuma Saidy Ndure	Norway	20.60	Q
2	5	David Alerte	France	20.70	Q
3	4	Johan Wissman	Sweden	20.79	Q
4	7	Marc Schneeberger	Switzerland	20.80	q
5	8	Vyacheslav Kolesnichenko	Russia	20.95	q, PB
6	1	Matteo Galvan	Italy	20.96	
7	3	Steven Colvert	Ireland	21.14	
8	6	Piotr Wiaderek	Poland	21.20	
				Wind: -0.6 m/s	

==== Heat 4 ====
Rank	Lane	Athlete	Nation	Time	Notes
1	2	Marlon Devonish	Great Britain & N.I.	20.68	Q, =SB
2	5	Paul Hession	Ireland	20.69	Q
3	6	Sebastian Ernst	Germany	20.72	Q
4	7	Likoúrgos-Stéfanos Tsákonas	Greece	20.74	q
5	1	Jonathan Åstrand	Finland	20.78	q, PB
6	4	Dmitriy Glushchenko	Israel	21.09	
7	8	Gregor Kokalovic	Slovenia	21.24	
–	3	Francis Obikwelu	Portugal	DNS	
				Wind: +0.2 m/s	

=== Semi-finals ===
First 3 in each heat and 2 best performers advance to the Final.

==== Heat 1 ====
Rank	Lane	Athlete	Nation	Time	Notes
1	4	Jaysuma Saidy Ndure	Norway	20.50	Q
2	3	Marlon Devonish	Great Britain & N.I.	20.55	Q, SB
3	8	Martial Mbandjock	France	20.62	Q
4	5	Paul Hession	Ireland	20.67	q
5	2	Likoúrgos-Stéfanos Tsákonas	Greece	20.75	q
6	1	Vyacheslav Kolesnichenko	Russia	20.88	PB
7	6	Arnaldo Abrantes	Portugal	20.88	
8	7	Sebastian Ernst	Germany	20.95	
				Wind: +1.2 m/s	

==== Heat 2 ====
Rank	Lane	Athlete	Nation	Time	Notes
1	6	Christophe Lemaitre	France	20.39	Q
2	5	Christian Malcolm	Great Britain & N.I.	20.58	Q
3	4	David Alerte	France	20.59	Q
4	8	Johan Wissman	Sweden	20.77	
5	3	Kamil Kryński	Poland	20.81	=PB
6	1	Jonathan Åstrand	Finland	20.81	
7	2	Marc Schneeberger	Switzerland	20.82	
8	7	Jeffrey Lawal-Balogun	Great Britain & N.I.	20.85	
				Wind: +0.8 m/s	

=== Final ===
Rank	Lane	Athlete	Nation	Time	Notes
1st place, gold medalist(s)	5	Christophe Lemaitre	France	20.37	
2nd place, silver medalist(s)	6	Christian Malcolm	Great Britain & N.I.	20.38	SB
3rd place, bronze medalist(s)	8	Martial Mbandjock	France	20.42	
4	3	Marlon Devonish	Great Britain & N.I.	20.62	
5	4	Jaysuma Saidy Ndure	Norway	20.63	
6	2	Paul Hession	Ireland	20.71	
7	1	Likoúrgos-Stéfanos Tsákonas	Greece	20.90	
8	7	David Alerte	France	1:27.24	
				Wind: -0.8 m/s	
