= Simone Collio =

Italian sprinter (born 1979)

Simone Collio OLY
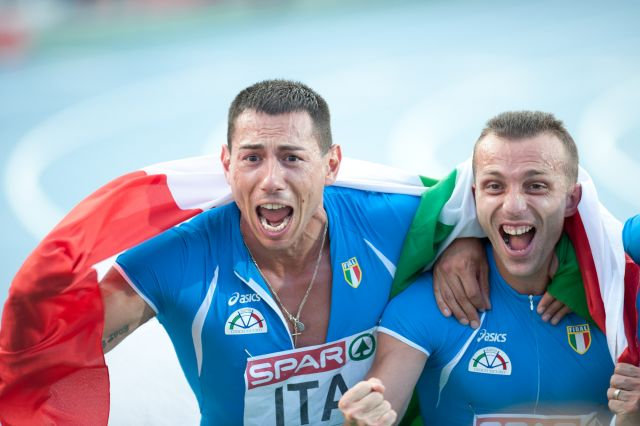
- Simone Collio (left) with Emanuele Di Gregorio at Barcelona 2010

Personal information
- Nationality: Italian
- Born: 27 December 1979 (age 46) Cernusco sul Naviglio, Italy
- Height: 1.80 m (5 ft 11 in)
- Weight: 74 kg (163 lb)

Sport
- Country: Italy
- Sport: Athletics
- Event: Sprint
- Club: G.S. Fiamme Gialle
- Retired: 2015

Achievements and titles
- Personal best: 100 m: 10.06 (2009)
Medal record
Event	1st	2nd	3rd
European Championships	0	1	0
European Team Championships	3	1	2
European Indoor Cup	0	1	0
Mediterranean Games	2	0	0
Total	5	3	2
European Championships
Silver medal – second place	2010 Barcelona	4 × 100 m relay
European Team Championships
Gold medal – first place	2003 Florence	4 × 100 m relay
Gold medal – first place	2009 Leira	4 × 100 m relay
Gold medal – first place	2010 Bergen	4 × 100 m relay
Silver medal – second place	2005 Florence	4 × 100 m relay
Bronze medal – third place	2005 Florence	100 m
Bronze medal – third place	2008 Annecy	4 × 100 m relay
European Indoor Cup
Silver medal – second place	2004 Leipzig	60 m
Mediterranean Games
Gold medal – first place	2009 Pescara	4 × 100 m relay
Gold medal – first place	2013 Mersin	4 × 100 m relay

Simone Collio (born 27 December 1979 in Cernusco sul Naviglio) is an Italian sprinter who specializes in the 60 and 100 metres. His personal best times are 6.55 seconds in the 60 metres (indoor) and 10.06 seconds in the 100 metres, the third all-time best performance in the Italian ranking of 100 meters, after the 10.01 at altitude of Pietro Mennea and 9.99 of Filippo Tortu.

== Biography ==
Participating in the 2004 Summer Olympics, he achieved fourth place in his 100 metres heat, thus securing qualification to the second round. He then achieved sixth place in his second round heat, thus failing to secure qualification to the semi-finals. At the 2008 Summer Olympics in Beijing he competed at the 100 metres sprint and placed 3rd in his heat behind Richard Thompson and Martial Mbandjock in a time of 10.32 seconds. He qualified for the second round, in which he failed to qualify for the semi-finals as his time of 10.33 was the 7th time in his race, causing elimination. Together with Fabio Cerutti, Emanuele di Gregorio and Jacques Riparelli he also competed at the 4 × 100 metres relay. In their qualification heat, they were disqualified and eliminated for the further competition.

== Personal life ==
He was engaged to the Bulgarian sprinter Ivet Lalova, whom he met in Sofia. They married in September 2013.

== Personal bests ==
Event	Time (seconds)	Venue	Date
50 metres	5.75	Liévin, France	10 February 2009
60 metres	6.55	Valencia, Spain	9 February 2008
100 metres	10.06	Rieti, Italy	22 July 2009
200 metres	20.84	Sofia	11 June 2009

- All information taken from IAAF profile.

== Achievements ==
Year	Competition	Venue	Position	Event	Notes
Representing Italy
2001	European U23 Championships	Amsterdam, Netherlands	5th	100 m	10.48 w (wind: 2.2 m/s)
2001	European U23 Championships	Amsterdam, Netherlands	—	4 × 100 m relay	DNF
2003	World Indoor Championships	Birmingham, United Kingdom	19th (sf)	60 m	6.71
2003	World Championships	Paris, France	13th (sf)	4 × 100 m relay	38.93
2004	World Indoor Championships	Budapest, Hungary	7th	60 m	6.60
2004	Olympic Games	Athens, Greece	29th (qf)	100 m	10.29
2004	Olympic Games	Athens, Greece	11th (h)	4 × 100 m relay	38.79
2005	European Indoor Championships	Madrid, Spain	5th	60 m	6.66
2005	World Championships	Helsinki, Finland	29th (qf)	100 m	10.60
2005	World Championships	Helsinki, Finland	–	4 × 100 m relay	DQ
2007	World Championships	Osaka, Japan	19th (qf)	100 m	10.31
2007	World Championships	Osaka, Japan	10th (h)	4 × 100 m relay	38.81
2008	World Indoor Championships	Valencia, Spain	20th (sf)	60 m	6.74
2008	Olympic Games	Beijing, China	30th (qf)	100 m	10.33
2008	Olympic Games	Beijing, China	–	4 × 100 m relay	DQ
2009	European Indoor Championships	Turin, Italy	17th (h)	60 m	6.72
2009	Mediterranean Games	Pescara, Italy	1st	4 × 100 m relay	38.82
2009	World Championships	Berlin, Germany	48th (h)	100 m	10.49
2009	World Championships	Berlin, Germany	6th	4 × 100 m relay	38.54
2010	European Championships	Barcelona, Spain	8th	100 m	DNF
2010	European Championships	Barcelona, Spain	2nd	4 × 100 m relay	38.17 (NR)
2011	World Championships	Daegu, South Korea	5th	4 × 100 m relay	38.96
2012	World Indoor Championships	Istanbul, Turkey	10th (sf)	60 m	6.71
2012	European Championships	Helsinki, Finland	—	100 m	DSQ
2012	Olympic Games	London. United Kingdom	Heat	4 × 100 metres relay	38.58
2013	Mediterranean Games	Mersin, Turkey	1st	4 × 100 m relay	39.06

== National titles ==
He won 7 national championships at individual senior level.

- Italian Athletics Championships
  - 100 metres: 2004, 2005, 2009, 2010
- Italian Indoor Athletics Championships
  - 60 metres: 2004, 2005, 2009

== See also ==
- Italian all-time lists - 100 metres
- Italy national relay team
