= 2005 European Athletics Indoor Championships – Men's 60 metres =

The Men's 60 metres event at the 2005 European Athletics Indoor Championships was held on March 4–5.

== Medalists ==
Gold	Silver	Bronze
Jason Gardener; Great Britain	Ronald Pognon; France	Kostyantyn Vasyukov; Ukraine

Note: Mark Lewis-Francis originally finished second but was later stripped off his medal for the use of cannabis.

== Results ==
=== Heats ===
First 3 of each heat (Q) and the next 4 fastest (q) qualified for the semifinals.

Rank	Heat	Name	Nationality	Time	Notes
1	4	Jason Gardener	Great Britain	6.58	Q
2	2	Ronald Pognon	France	6.59	Q
3	3	Luca Verdecchia	Italy	6.62	Q
3	4	Matic Osovnikar	Slovenia	6.62	Q, SB
5	1	Łukasz Chyła	Poland	6.63	Q
5	4	Andrey Yepishin	Russia	6.63	Q
7	1	Darren Chin	Great Britain	6.66	Q
8	1	Simone Collio	Italy	6.66	Q
9	3	Matic Šušteršic	Slovenia	6.67	Q, =PB
10	2	Nathan Bongelo	Belgium	6.68	Q
11	2	Efthimios Steryioulis	Greece	6.68	Q
12	2	Kostyantyn Vasyukov	Ukraine	6.70	q
13	2	Tim Göbel	Germany	6.70	q
14	2	Nipa Tran	Finland	6.74	q
15	4	Marc Blume	Germany	6.76	q
15	1	Markus Lüthi	Switzerland	6.76	
15	1	Tommi Hartonen	Finland	6.76	
18	2	Desislav Gunev	Bulgaria	6.79	
18	3	Darren Gilford	Malta	6.79	SB
18	3	Attila Farkas	Hungary	6.79	
18	3	Alexander Smirnov	Russia	6.79	
22	3	Sébastien Calpas	France	6.80	
23	4	Peter Krčmárek	Slovakia	6.82	
24	4	Jer O'Donoghue	Ireland	6.83	
25	1	Marko Janković	Serbia and Montenegro	6.86	
26	1	Daniel Persson	Sweden	6.88	
27	4	Simo Sipilä	Finland	7.19	
	3	Mark Lewis-Francis	Great Britain	DQ (6.64)	

=== Semifinals ===
First 4 of each semifinals qualified directly (Q) for the final.

Rank	Heat	Name	Nationality	Time	Notes
1	1	Andrey Yepishin	Russia	6.58	Q, PB
1	1	Jason Gardener	Great Britain	6.58	Q
1	2	Ronald Pognon	France	6.58	Q
4	1	Łukasz Chyła	Poland	6.62	Q
5	1	Simone Collio	Italy	6.63	Q
6	1	Matic Osovnikar	Slovenia	6.66	
7	2	Kostyantyn Vasyukov	Ukraine	6.68	Q
8	2	Tim Göbel	Germany	6.69	Q
9	1	Nathan Bongelo	Belgium	6.71	
10	1	Marc Blume	Germany	6.71	
11	2	Matic Šušteršic	Slovenia	6.72	
12	2	Luca Verdecchia	Italy	6.74	
13	2	Nipa Tran	Finland	6.75	
14	2	Darren Chin	Great Britain	7.11	
	2	Mark Lewis-Francis	Great Britain	DQ (6.60)	
	1	Efthimios Steryioulis	Greece	DNS	

=== Final ===
Rank	Lane	Name	Nationality	Time	React	Notes
1st place, gold medalist(s)	6	Jason Gardener	Great Britain	6.55	0.132	SB
2nd place, silver medalist(s)	5	Ronald Pognon	France	6.62	0.127	
3rd place, bronze medalist(s)	8	Kostyantyn Vasyukov	Ukraine	6.62	0.108	
4	3	Andrey Yepishin	Russia	6.65	0.150	
5	1	Simone Collio	Italy	6.66	0.137	
6	2	Łukasz Chyła	Poland	6.66	0.172	
7	7	Tim Göbel	Germany	6.80	0.192	
	4	Mark Lewis-Francis	Great Britain	DQ (6.59)		
