= Switzerland at the 2010 European Athletics Championships =

Sporting event delegation

Switzerland was represented by 22 athletes (12 men and 10 women) at the 2010 European Athletics Championships held in Barcelona, Spain, from 27 July to 1 August 2010.

== Participants ==
Event	Men	Women
200 m	Marc Schneeberger; Alex Wilson	
5000 m	Philipp Bandi	Sabine Fischer
10,000 m	Christian Belz	Martina Strähl
100 m hurdles		Lisa Urech; Clélia Reuse
400 m hurdles	Fausto Santini	
Marathon	Viktor Röthlin	Patricia Morceli; Maja Neuenschwander
High Jump		Beatrice Lundmark
Pole Vault		Anna Katharina Schmid
Long Jump		Irene Pusterla
Triple Jump	Alexander Martínez	
Decathlon	Simon Walter	
Heptathlon		Linda Züblin
4 × 100 m relay	Pascal Mancini; Aron Beyene; Marc Schneeberger; Reto Amaru Schenkel; Alex Wilson; Rolf Malcolm Fongué	

== Results ==
2010 Barcelona	Gold	Silver	Bronze	Total
Switzerland (SUI)	1	0	0	0
