= Steve Mullings =

Jamaican former sprint athlete (born 1982)

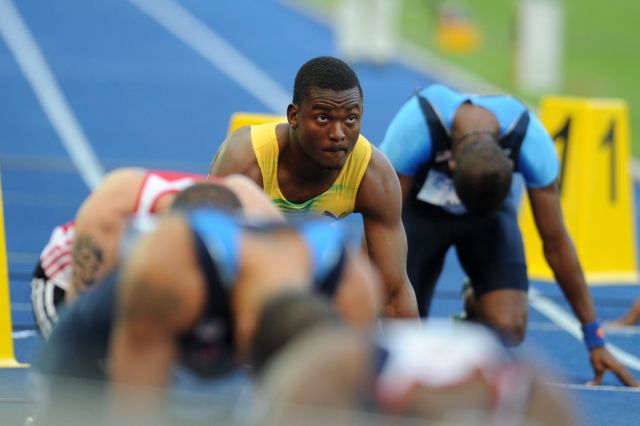
- Mullings at the 2009 World Championships 200 m race

Personal information
- Born: 28 November 1982 (age 43) Saint Elizabeth Parish, Jamaica
- Height: 1.76 m (5 ft 9 in)

Sport
- Sport: Running

Achievements and titles
- Personal bests: 100 m: 9.80 s (Eugene, Oregon 2011); 200 m: 19.98 s (Berlin 2009)
Medal record
Representing Jamaica
Men's athletics
World Championships in Athletics
Gold medal – first place	2009 Berlin	4 × 100 m relay
Silver medal – second place	2007 Osaka	4 × 100 m relay
Pan American Junior Championships
Silver medal – second place	2001 Santa Fe	4 × 100 m relay
Bronze medal – third place	2001 Santa Fe	100 m
CAC Junior Championships (U20)
Gold medal – first place	2000 San Juan	4 × 100 m relay
CARIFTA Games Junior (U20)
Silver medal – second place	2001 Bridgetown	4 × 100 m relay

Steve Mullings (born 28 November 1982) is a Jamaican former sprint athlete who specialized in the 100 and 200 metres events.

In 2011 he was given a lifetime ban for doping.

== Career ==
Mullings began his international athletics career with a bronze medal win in the 100 m at the Pan American Junior Championships. At the 2004 national championship he made his first impact in senior athletics, setting new bests of 10.04 and 20.22 in the sprints, and finishing as the 200 m national champion. This earned him qualification into the 2004 Summer Olympics, but he was withdrawn from the competition after his sample from the national championships tested positive for banned substances. After his B sample also tested positive for testosterone, he was banned from competition for two years and his results between mid-2004 and 2005 were removed from the record.

He returned to competition in 2006 but finished the season with unimpressive bests of 10.31 and 20.54. The following year was much more successful. He won the 100 m in Zaragoza with a wind-aided (3.7 m/s) run of 9.91 seconds, and featured on the 2007 IAAF Golden League circuit. He competed at the 2007 World Championships in Athletics as a heats runner for the Jamaican silver medal-winning 4 × 100 metres relay team.

After an uneventful 2008, Mullings returned to form in 2009. He placed second over 200 metres in the national championships behind Olympic champion Usain Bolt. He set new personal bests in both sprints in July, running 20.01 seconds over 200 m in Rethymno, and 10.01 seconds over 100 m at the Golden Gala. Competing at the 2009 World championships in Berlin, Mullings finished 5th behind Bolt in the 200 m in a personal best time of 19.98 seconds and won his first global gold medal as part of the successful Jamaican 4 × 100 metres relay team, running in both heats and the final.

In 2011, he broke the 10 second barrier for the first time at age 28, and by the end of the year had run under 10 seconds seven times.

== Lifetime ban for doping violations ==
However, on 11 August 2011, it was reported that Mullings had tested positive for the drug Furosemide, a masking agent. The positive test was recorded at the Jamaican national trials in June where he finished third in the men's 100-metre final. On 22 November the Jamaican Anti-Doping Disciplinary Panel handed him a lifetime ban from athletics. They voted unanimously on the decision. An appeal by Mullings was dismissed by the Court of Arbitration for Sport in March 2013 and his lifetime ban was confirmed.

== Personal bests ==
Event	Time	Venue	Date	Ref
60 metres	6.59	Manhattan, Kansas, United States	6 March 2004	
100 metres	9.80 (+1.3 m/s)	Eugene, Oregon, United States	4 June 2011	
200 metres	19.98	Berlin, Germany	20 August 2009	

- All information taken from IAAF profile.

=== Track records ===
As of 8 September 2024, Mullings holds the following track records for 100 metres and 200 metres.

==== 100 metres ====
Location	Time	Windspeed m/s	Date
Lappeenranta	10.03	+1.2	15/07/2010
Starkville, MS.	9.90	+2.0	16/04/2011

==== 200 metres ====
Location	Time	Windspeed m/s	Date
Fort Worth, TX	19.90	+3.8	17/04/2004
Lapinlahti	20.21	+2.8	18/07/2010
