= Roberto Donati =

Italian sprinter

Personal information
- Nationality: Italian
- Born: March 15, 1983 (age 43) Rieti, Italy
- Height: 1.85 m (6 ft 1 in)
- Weight: 83 kg (183 lb)

Sport
- Country: Italy
- Sport: Athletics
- Event: Sprint
- Club: C.S. Esercito

Achievements and titles
- Personal bests: 100 m: 10.34 (2009); 200 m: 20.88 (2009)
Medal record
Event	1st	2nd	3rd
European Championships	0	1	0
European Team Championships	1	0	0

Roberto Donati (born March 15, 1983, in Rieti) is an Italian sprinter.

== Biography ==
Roberto Donati won two medals at the International athletics competitions, all of these with national relays team. He has 4 caps in national team from 2009 to 2010. He is the brother of Massimiliano Donati.

== Achievements ==
Year	Competition	Venue	Position	Event	Notes
Representing Italy
2005	European U23 Championships	Erfurt, Germany	14th (h)	400m hurdles	51.95
2005	European U23 Championships	Erfurt, Germany	8th	4 × 400 m relay	3:11.10
2009	World Championships	Berlin, Germany	6th	4 × 100 m relay	38.54
2010	European Team Championships	Bergen, Norway	1st	4 × 100 m relay	38.83
2010	European Championships	Barcelona, Spain	2nd	4 × 100 m relay	38.17

== National titles ==
He has won two times the individual national championship.

- 2 wins in 200 metres (2009, 2010)

== See also ==
- Italy national relay team
