= Ryan Moseley =

Austrian sprinter

Ryan Moseley (born 8 October 1982 in Bridgetown) is a Barbados-born Austrian sprinter who specializes in the 100 metres and 200 metres. He is several times Austrian champion sprinter for 60m, 100m and 200m track & field events.

== Achievements ==
Year	Competition	Venue	Position	Event	Notes
Representing Austria
2009	European Indoor Championships	Turin, Italy	8th	60 m	6.69
2009	World Championships	Berlin, Germany	58th (h)	100 m	10.58
2010	World Indoor Championships	Doha, Qatar	18th (sf)	60 m	6.71
2010	European Championships	Barcelona, Spain	9th (sf)	100 m	10.27
2010	European Championships	Barcelona, Spain	22nd (h)	200 m	21.07
2011	European Indoor Championships	Paris, France	8th	60 m	6.68
