= Paul Hession =

Irish sprinter

- Paul Hession

Personal information
- Nationality: Irish
- Born: 27 January 1983 (age 43) Galway, Ireland
- Home town: Athenry
- Education: M.B. B.Ch. B.A.O., 2014, NUI Galway
- Height: 1.84 m (6 ft 0 in)
- Weight: 77 kg (170 lb; 12.1 st)

Sport
- Sport: Running
- Event(s): 100 metres, 200 metres
- Club: Athenry AC
Medal record
Representing Ireland
Men's Athletics
World Athletics Final
Silver medal – second place	2008 Stuttgart	200 m
European Team Championships
Silver medal – second place	2009 Banská Bystrica	Second League
Summer Universiade
Silver medal – second place	2003 Daegu	200 m
Bronze medal – third place	2005 Izmir	200 m

Paul Hession (born 27 January 1983 in Galway) is an Irish international track and field athlete who is the fastest Irishman in history over 200 metres. He specialises in the sprinting events, particularly the 200 metres. He has won silver and bronze medals at the World University Games, a silver medallist in the 200 m in the 2008 IAAF World Athletics Final and in 2007 made the leap into world class by setting 4 Irish national records at 100 metres and 200 metres. He is a member of the Athenry Athletics Club.

== Career ==
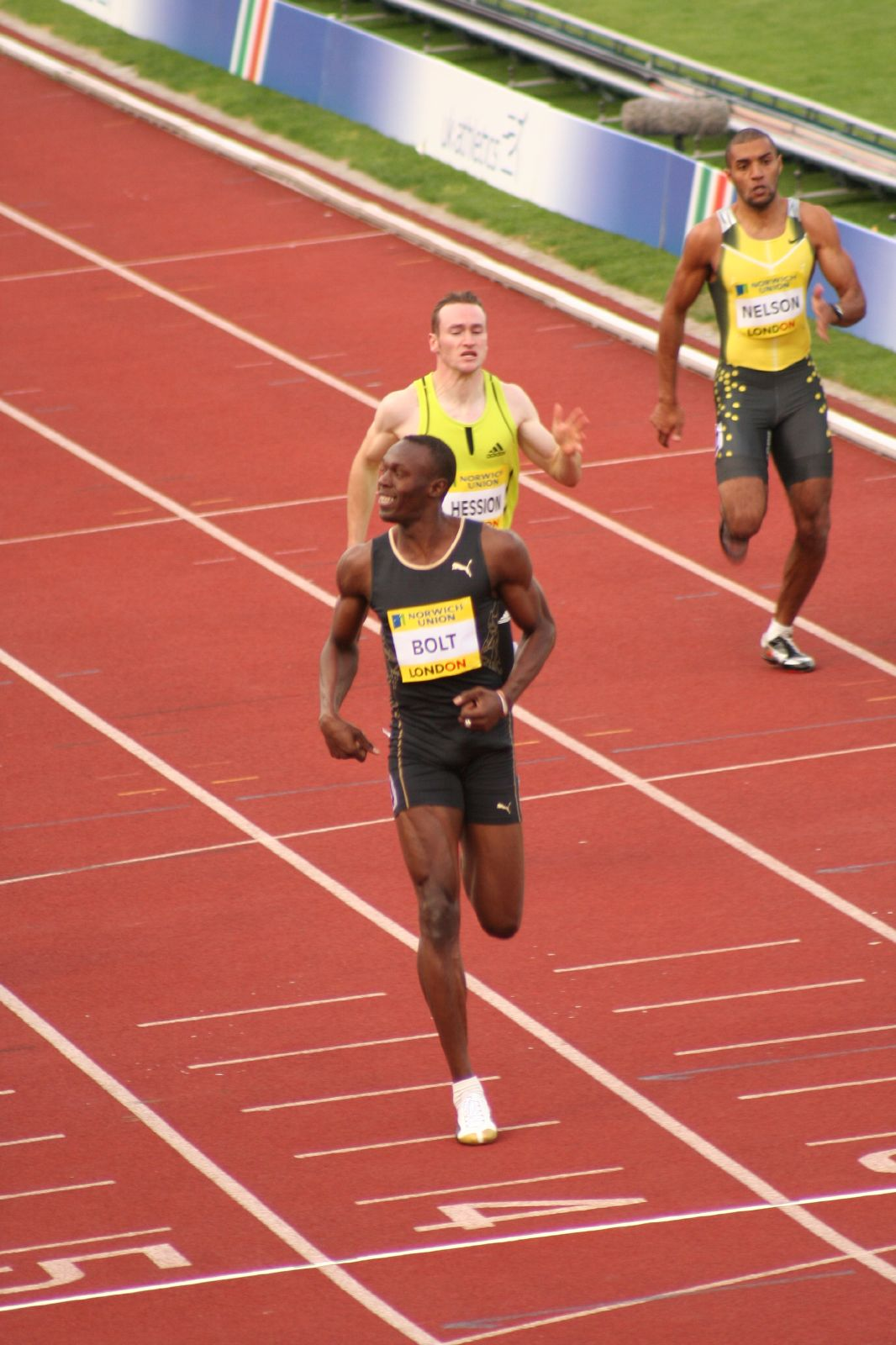
Paul Hession (in the third lane) finishes the 200 m race at the Crystal Palace Athletic Meeting 2007 behind Jamaican Usain Bolt

=== Early career ===
After competing in the IAAF World Junior Championships in 2002, Hession made his major championship debut for Ireland the same year, at the 2002 European Championships where he finished 7th in his heat in a time of 21.28. The following year Hession missed the World Championships but was rewarded with silver medal in the 200 m at the World University Games. Two years later Hession won bronze in the 2005 edition. He followed this up with a disappointing run in his first World Athletics Championship. In the 2006 European Championships Hession ran poorly in the semi-final and with a time of 20.80 was eliminated.

In 2007, Hession broke his first Irish national record by running the 100 m in 10.28 in Kalamata. Only three weeks later he lowered the record to 10.18 in Vaasa. When Hession stepped up to his preferred distance of 200 m he again broke the Irish record twice. First running 20.44 in the Sheffield Grand prix, and then 20.30 in the Irish national championships in Dublin.

=== Olympics and beyond ===
Hession competed in the 2008 Summer Olympics in Beijing. He trained in Japan in the build-up. On 18 August he won his 200 m quarter final to qualify for the semi-final in a time of 20.32, just after Usain Bolt had a time of 20.29. In the semi-final he finished fifth in a time of 20.38 however he missed out on a place in the final as only the top four qualified.

Hession had another very good season on the 2008 Grand Prix circuit, this time claiming second place in the 200 m at the World Athletics Final. On 15 November 2008 Paul was awarded Athlete of the Year at the annual Athletics Ireland awards dinner.

In the 2010 European Athletics Championships in Barcelona. Hession made history as the first Irishman to qualify for the finals of the 200 metres in the European Athletics Championships. Hession ran 20.71 seconds, finishing 6th in the final.

Hession participated in the 2012 London Olympics. In his first round heat he ran the 200m in a time of 20.69 sec which yielded him 5th place in his heat. That was not enough to see him through to the semi-final.

== Studies ==
A graduate of NUI Galway, at last he received a M.B. B.Ch., B.A.O. in 2014, as well as a Final Medical Medal for Outstanding Sporting Achievement on the same occasion. He had put his medical studies on hold to pursue athletics full-time. Hession is currently working as a doctor in Children's University Hospital, Temple Street, Dublin.
