= Martial Mbandjock =

French sprinter (born 1985)

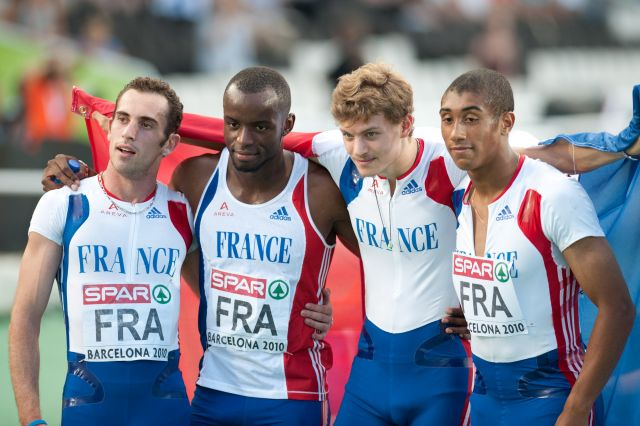
- Mbanjock (centre left) with the victorious 2010 European relay team

Personal information
- Nationality: France
- Born: 14 October 1985 (age 40) Roubaix, Nord, France
- Height: 187 cm (6 ft 2 in)
- Weight: 84 kg (185 lb)

Sport
- Sport: Running

Achievements and titles
- Personal bests: 100 m: 10.06 s (Albi 2008); 200 m: 20.38 s (Tomblaine 2010)
Medal record
Representing France
Men's athletics
European Championships
Gold medal – first place	2010 Barcelona	4 × 100 m
Bronze medal – third place	2010 Barcelona	100 m
Bronze medal – third place	2010 Barcelona	200 m
European U23 Championships
Bronze medal – third place	2007 Debrecen	100 m
Mediterranean Games
Gold medal – first place	2009 Pescara	100 m

Martial Mbandjock (born 14 October 1985 in Roubaix) is a French sprinter who specializes in the 100 metres. His personal best time is 10.06 seconds, achieved in July 2008 in Albi.

He won the bronze medal in the 100 m at the 2007 European Athletics U23 Championships and reached the quarterfinals at the 2007 World Championships later that year. He got to the semifinals at the 2008 World Indoor Championships and the 2008 Olympic Games. He won his first national title at the outdoor French championships, running a personal best of 10.06 seconds in the 100 m, helped by good running conditions with a 1.7 m/s tailwind.

At the 2008 Beijing Olympics he competed at the 100 metres sprint and placed second in his heat behind Richard Thompson in a time of 10.26 seconds. He qualified for the second round in which he improved his time to 10.16 seconds, finishing third behind Thompson and Tyson Gay, reaching the semi-finals. There he was unable to achieve his final spot as he finished in 8th place in 10.18 seconds. Together with Yannick Lesourd, Manuel Reynaert and Samuel Coco-Viloin he also competed at the 4 × 100 metres relay. In their qualification heat they finished sixth in a time of 39.53 seconds, which meant elimination.

In the 2009 season, Mbandjock began with modest times between 10.20 and 10.30 seconds. He improved to 10.11 at a meeting in Nancy, France in June, achieving the A standard qualifying time for the 2009 World Championships in Berlin later that year. Despite finishing out of the medals in fourth in the 100 m, he set a personal best of 20.67 seconds in the 200 m to take bronze at the 2009 European Team Championships. He won his first major gold shortly after with a win in the 100 m at the 2009 Mediterranean Games.

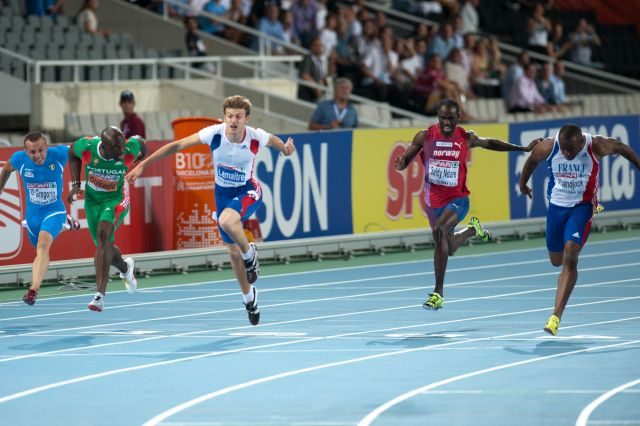
Mbanjock (right) taking the 100 m bronze at the 2010 European Championships

He competed in three events at the 2009 World Championships: he finished sixth in the 100 metres semi-finals, the second best performance by a European after finalist Dwain Chambers. Next came the 200 metres competition, where he recorded a personal best of 20.43 seconds in his semi-final for fifth place. He was eliminated at that stage, although he ran faster than compatriot David Alerte who did reach the final via the other semi-final. His final competition of the championships was with France in the 4 × 100 metres relay. The team reached the final and placed in eighth.

At the 2010 European Athletics Championships, Mbandjock had a significant breakthrough, winning bronze medals in both the 100 m and 200 m, as well as a gold in the relay – although his achievements were somewhat overshadowed by his compatriot Christophe Lemaitre, who won all three races.
