= Marco Cribari =

Swiss sprinter (born 1985)

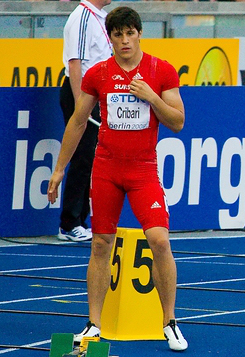
Marco Cribari at the 2009 World Championships in Athletics.

Marco Cribari (born 7 July 1985) is a former Swiss sprinter, who specialized in the 200 m.

Cribari was born in Zurich. He competed at the 2004 World Junior Championships, the 2006 European Championships, the 2007 World Championships, the 2008 Olympic Games and the 2009 World Championships without reaching the final. In the 4 x 100 metres relay he competed at the 2009 World Championships.

His personal best times are 10.35 seconds in the 100 m, achieved in July 2007 in Lausanne; and 20.54 seconds in the 200 m, achieved in June 2007 in Genève. He also held the Swiss record in the 4 × 100 m relay from 2008 until 2010.

In October 2009 Cribari ended his career because, as he stated, it was no longer possible for him to combine his sportive activities with his study of medicine.
