= Mark Lewis-Francis =

British track and field sprinter (b.1982)

Mark Lewis-Francis MBE
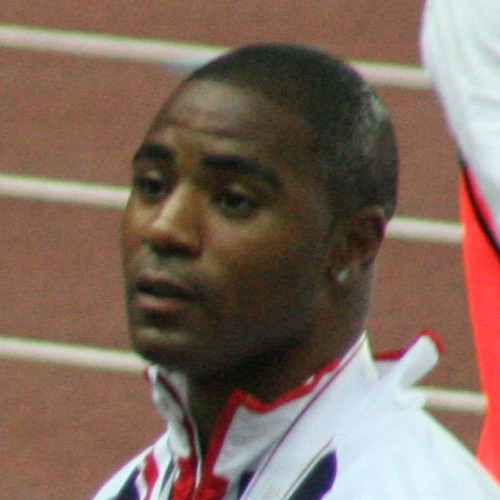
- Lewis-Francis in Osaka, 2007.

Personal information
- Nationality: British (English)
- Born: 4 September 1982 (age 43) Birmingham, England
- Height: 1.83 m (6 ft 0 in)
- Weight: 89 kg (196 lb)

Sport
- Sport: Athletics
- Events: Sprints (100 m & 4 × 100 m relay)
- Club: Birchfield Harriers

Achievements and titles
- Personal bests: 100 m: 10.04 s (Paris 2002); 200 m: 20.89 s (Loughborough 2010)
Medal record
Men's athletics
Representing Great Britain
Olympic Games
Gold medal – first place	2004 Athens	4 × 100 m relay
World Championships
Bronze medal – third place	2005 Helsinki	4 × 100 m relay
Bronze medal – third place	2007 Osaka	4 × 100 m relay
World Indoor Championships
Bronze medal – third place	2001 Lisbon	60 m
European Championships
Gold medal – first place	2006 Gothenburg	4 × 100 m relay
Silver medal – second place	2010 Barcelona	100 m
Representing England
Commonwealth Games
Gold medal – first place	2010 Delhi	4 × 100 m relay
Silver medal – second place	2010 Delhi	100 m
Representing Europe
Continental Cup
Silver medal – second place	2006 Athens	4 × 100 m relay
Bronze medal – third place	2010 Split	100 m

Mark Anthony Lewis-Francis, MBE (born 4 September 1982) is a retired British track and field athlete, specifically a sprinter, who specialised in the 100 metres and was an accomplished regular of GB 4 × 100 m relay. A renowned junior, his greatest sporting achievement at senior level has been to anchor the Great Britain and Northern Ireland 4 × 100 metres relay team to a gold medal at the 2004 Summer Olympics. Individually, Lewis-Francis has won the silver medal in the 100 m at the 2010 European Athletics Championships and silver medal in the 2010 Commonwealth Games, men's 100 m final.

== Career ==
Lewis-Francis, a member of the Birchfield Harriers athletics club and known as the "Darlaston Dart", burst onto the scene at an early age but did not attend the 2000 Summer Olympics, instead competing at the World Junior Championships, in which he won gold. In 2001 Lewis-Francis won a World Athletics Championships 100 m quarter-final heat in 9.97 seconds, which would have been a junior world record, but a wind gauge malfunction meant it was unratifiable.

Lewis-Francis became the British 100 metres champion after winning the British AAA Championships title at the 2002 AAA Championships and became Britain's top 100 m sprinter after Dwain Chambers was banned for drug use in 2003.

At the 2004 Olympic Games in Athens, he represented Great Britain and missed out on the final of the 100 m at the 2004 Summer Olympics, but days later ran the final leg of the 4 × 100 m relay, famously holding off former Olympic champion and world record holder Maurice Greene, allowing the Great Britain team to narrowly win in a time of 38.07 seconds. The gold medal team consisted of Lewis-Francis, Marlon Devonish, Darren Campbell and Jason Gardener. As the last of the four in both race and alphabetical order, Lewis-Francis became the fiftieth man to win a gold medal for Great Britain in Athletics at the Olympics.

He left his home town of Birmingham in 2005 to move to Eton and train with a new coach.

After a year out with an Achilles injury, Lewis-Francis engaged in warm weather training in California with his new coach Linford Christie. Putting a history of injuries behind him, he set his sights on making the 100 m final at the Berlin World Championships. However, he failed to make the team.

Following a late call up to the Great Britain squad, in July 2010 he won silver at the 2010 European Athletics Championships in a time of 10.18 seconds, his first major individual medal at senior level. Unfortunately, three days later in a heat of the 4 × 100 m relay, he blundered during the baton exchange that resulted in the team not making the final. Nonetheless, he was selected to represent Europe at the 2010 IAAF Continental Cup and he took the bronze medal, while European champion Christophe Lemaitre won the race. Lewis-Francis gained a second silver of the season at the 2010 Commonwealth Games: he recorded a season's best run of 10.15 seconds in the qualifiers and he ran 10.20 seconds to finish as runner-up behind Lerone Clarke in the final, having pulled himself back into contention after his starting blocks slipped.

Lewis-Francis joined the British bobsleigh team in August 2015, joining former track teammates Simeon Williamson and Joel Fearon in the team, with an aim to compete in the 2018 Winter Olympics in Pyeongchang, whilst also hoping to be selected for the sprints at the 2016 Summer Olympics in Rio de Janeiro.
