= Pierre-Alexis Pessonneaux =

French sprinter

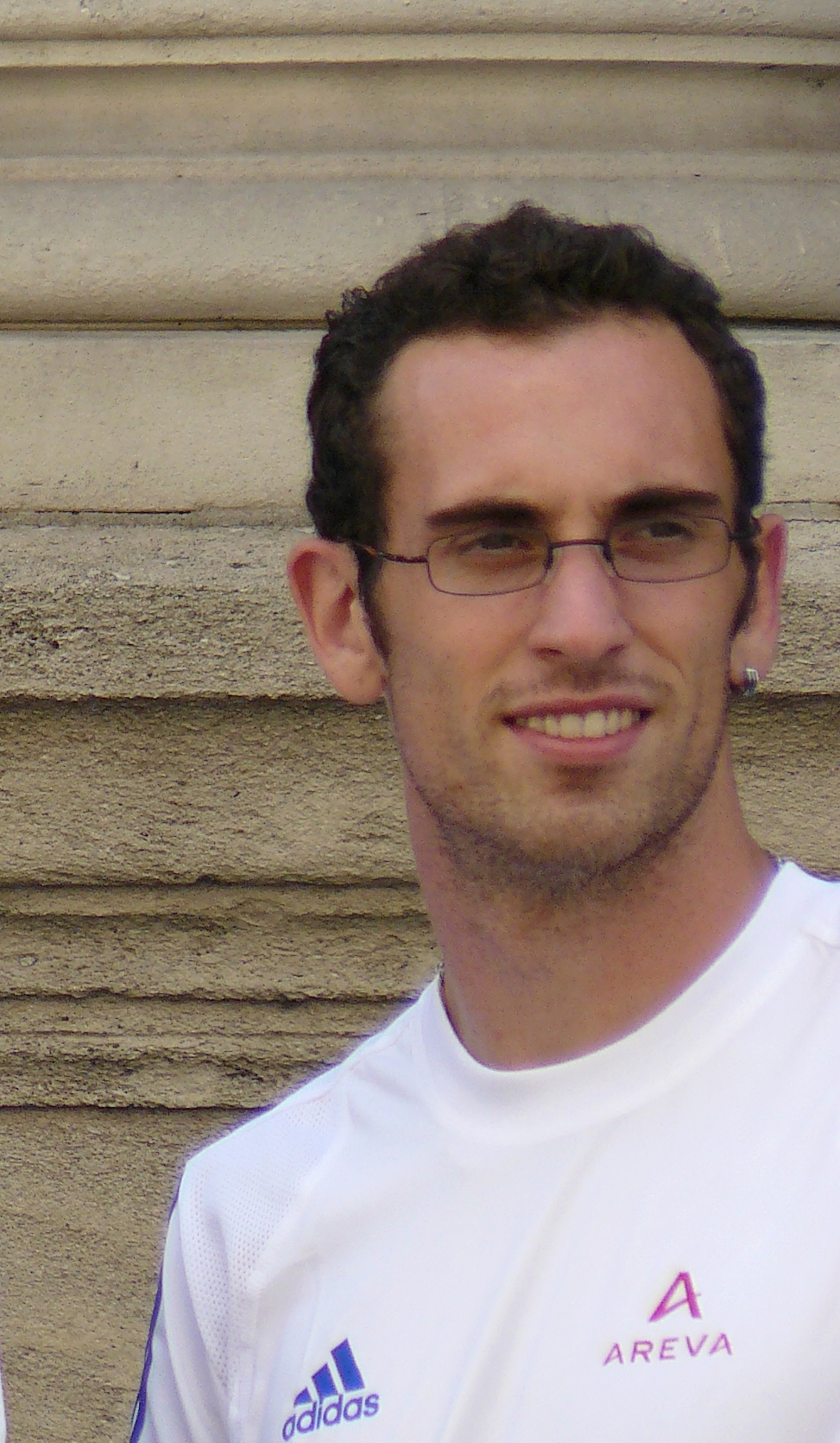
- Pessonneaux in 2010

Personal information
- Nationality: French
- Born: 25 November 1987 (age 38) Belley
- Height: 1.81 m (5 ft 11 1/2 in)
- Weight: 70 kg (150 lb)

Sport
- Sport: running
- Event: Sprinting (200 metres)

Achievements and titles
- Personal best: 200 m: 20.73 s (Geneva 2009)
Medal record
Men's athletics
Representing France
Olympic Games
| Bronze medal – third place | 2012 London | 4 × 100 m relay |
European Championships
| Gold medal – first place | 2010 Barcelona | 4 × 100 m relay |
| Bronze medal – third place | 2012 Helsinki | 4 × 100 m relay |
Mediterranean Games
| Silver medal – second place | 2009 Pescara | 4 × 100 m relay |

Pierre-Alexis Pessonneaux (born 25 November 1987) is a French sprinter who specialises in the 200 metres. He helped the French men's 4 × 100 metres relay team to the gold medal at the 2010 European Athletics Championships. At the 2012 Summer Olympics, Pessonneaux was part of France's 4 × 100 m relay team that claimed the bronze medal.

== Personal best ==
| Distance | Time | venue |
|---|---|---|
| 200 m | 20.61 s | Genève, Switzerland (6 June 2015) |
