= Martin Keller (athlete) =

German sprinter

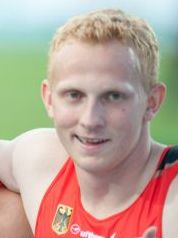
- Martin Keller at the 2010 European Championships.

Medal record

Representing Germany

Men's athletics

European Championships
Bronze medal – third place	2010 Barcelona	4 × 100 m relay

Martin Keller (born 26 September 1986, in Rochlitz, East Germany) is a track and field sprint athlete who competes internationally for Germany.

Keller represented Germany at the 2008 Summer Olympics in Beijing. He competed at the 4 × 100 metres relay together with Tobias Unger, Alexander Kosenkow and Till Helmke. In their qualification heat they placed third behind Jamaica and Canada, but in front of China. Their time of 38.93 was the sixth fastest out of sixteen participating nations in the first round and they qualified for the final. There they sprinted to a time of 38.58 seconds, which was the fifth time.
