= Nedim Čović =

Bosnian sprinter

Nedim Čović (born 27 May 1988 in Sarajevo) is a Bosnian former sprinter. Since 2010, he has held national records in the 100 metres, 200 metres and the 4 × 100 metres relay. Additionally, he represented his country at the 2010 European Athletics Championships, as well as four editions of the European Cup and European Team Championships between 2006 and 2010, where he managed several podium finishes.

As of 2019, he was working as a conditioning coach for a football club, FK Željezničar Sarajevo.

== Personal bests ==
Outdoors

- 100 metres – 10.42 (+0.2 m/s, Velenje 2010)
- 200 metres – 21.05 (+0.9 m/s, Sarajevo 2010)

Indoors

- 60 metres – 6.98 (Athens 2008)
