= Tobias Unger =

German sprinter

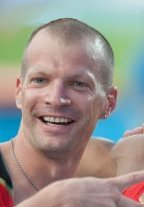
- Unger in 2010

Personal information
- Full name: Tobias Benjamin Unger
- Born: 10 July 1979 (age 46) Munich, West Germany
- Height: 1.79 m (5 ft 10 in)
- Weight: 70 kg (154 lb)

Sport
- Country: Germany
- Sport: Track and field
- Event(s): 100 metres, 200 metres

Achievements and titles
- Personal best(s): 100 m: 10.14 s (2010); 200 m: 20.20 s (2005)
Medal record
Men's athletics
Representing Germany
European Championships
Silver medal – second place	2012 Helsinki	4 × 100 m relay
Bronze medal – third place	2010 Barcelona	4 × 100 m relay
World Junior Championships
Bronze medal – third place	1998 Annecy	4 × 100 m relay

Tobias Benjamin Unger (born 10 July 1979) is a retired German track and field athlete who competed in sprints.

== Biography ==
Unger comes from Wendlingen am Neckar and studied sport science at the University of Tübingen and trained in Ludwigsburg. His trainer is the Romanian Micky Corucle. He was the tenth fastest 200 m runner in 2005, and the second fastest European that year. His personal bests in his two disciplines are 10.14 seconds (100 m) and 20.20 seconds (200 m).

Unger represented Germany at the 2008 Summer Olympics. In Beijing he competed in the 100 metres sprint and placed 4th in his heat behind Churandy Martina, Naoki Tsukahara and Simeon Williamson, normally causing elimination. However his time of 10.46 was the 10th fastest losing time, giving him a spot in the second round. There he improved his time to 10.36 seconds, but he was unable to qualify for the semifinals as he finished 7th place in his heat. Together with Till Helmke, Alexander Kosenkow and Martin Keller he also competed at the 4 × 100 metres relay. In their qualification heat they placed third behind Jamaica and Canada, but in front of China. Their time of 38.93 was the sixth-fastest out of sixteen participating nations in the first round, and they qualified for the final. There they sprinted to a time of 38.58 seconds, which was the fifth-best time.

== Honours ==
- Third in the 1998 junior World Championships relay
- German youth champion 2000
- Second place in the German Championships in 2001
- Seventh in the U-23 European Championships in 2001
- German champion in 2003
- Participant at the 2003 World Championships in Athletics
- German champion in 2004
- German indoor champion in 2004 (60 m, 200 m)
- Seventh place in the 2004 Summer Olympics in Athens (200 m)
- Bronze medal in the Indoor World Championships 2004
- Indoor European Champion 2005
- Double German champion in 2005 (100 metres, with a personal best time of 10.16 s; 200 metres, breaking Frank Emmelmann's national record with a time of 20.20)
- Seventh place in the 2005 World Championships, with a time of 20.81 s over 200 m

== See also ==
- German all-time top lists - 100 metres
- German all-time top lists - 200 metres
