= Marc Schneeberger =

Swiss sprinter

Personal information
- Born: 5 July 1981 (age 45) Täuffeln, Canton of Bern, Switzerland

Sport
- Sport: Track and field

Marc Schneeberger (born 5 July 1981) is a Swiss sprinter who specializes in the 200 metres.

He was born in Täuffeln. He competed at the 2006 European Championships, the 2007 World Championships, the 2008 Olympic Games, the 2009 World Championships, the 2010 European Championships and the 2011 World Championships without reaching the final. In the 4 x 100 metres relay he competed at the 2009 World Championships, the 2010 European Championships and the 2011 World Championships.

His personal best times are 10.46 seconds in the 100 metres, achieved in June 2009 in Frauenfeld; and 20.42 seconds in the 200 metres, achieved in August 2010 in Rieti. He also holds the Swiss record in the 4 x 100 metres relay.
