= Amaru Reto Schenkel =

Swiss sprinter (born 1988)

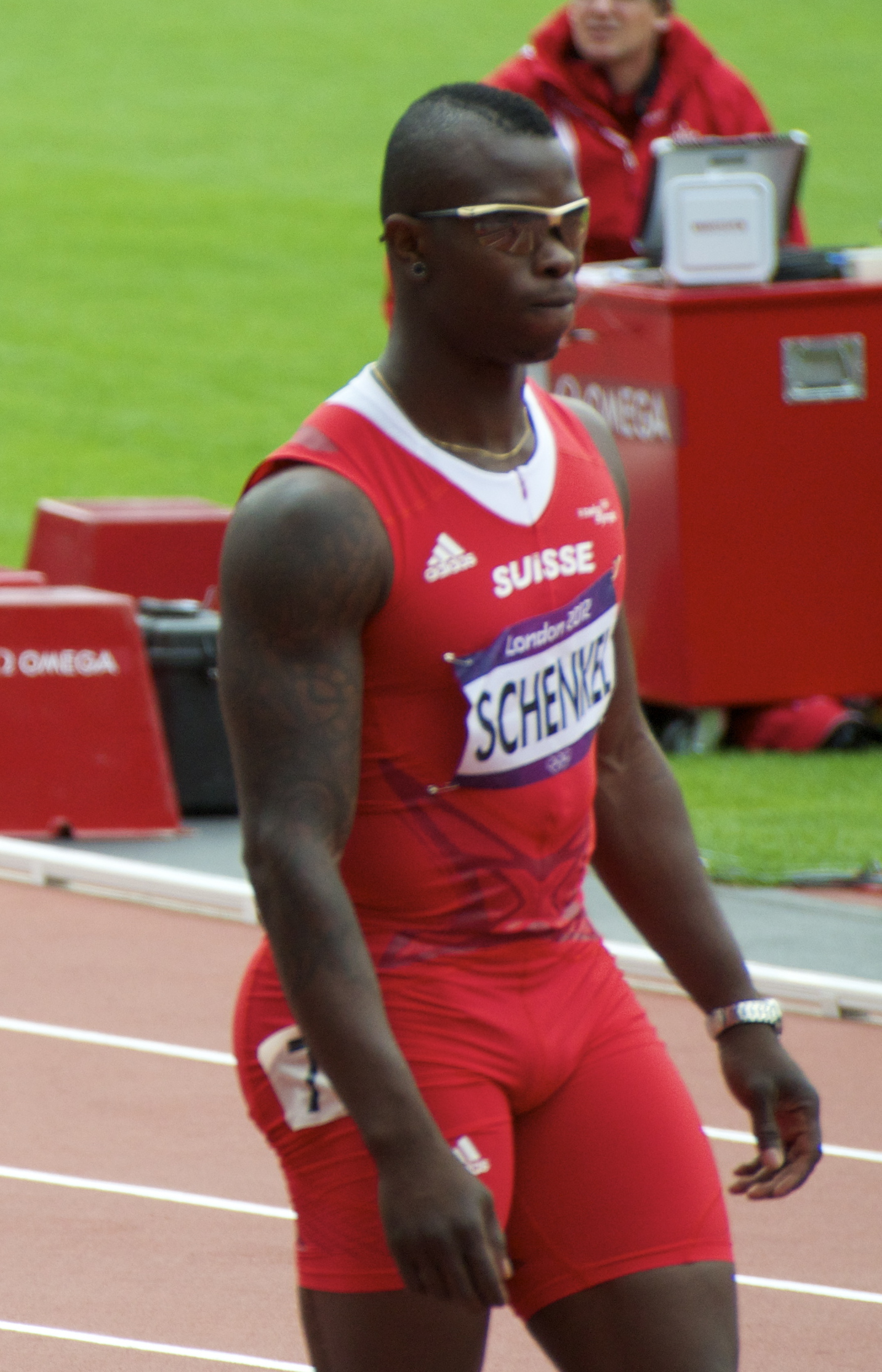
Reto Schenkel at the 2012 Olympics

Amaru Reto Schenkel (born 28 April 1988) is a sprinter who specializes in the 100 metres. Born in Lomé, Togo, he represents Switzerland.

Schenkel competed in both 100 and 200 m at the 2006 World Junior Championships. He finished fifth in the 100 m at the 2007 European Junior Championships. In the 4 × 100 m relay he finished fourth at the 2007 European Junior Championships and competed at the 2009 World Championships. He competed for Switzerland at the 2011 World Championships in 100 and 200 m and the 2012 Summer Olympics in the 200 m.

His personal best times are 6.65 seconds in the 60 m (indoor), achieved in January 2012 in Magglingen; 10.19 seconds in the 100 m, achieved in July 2011 in Fribourg; and 20.48 seconds in the 200 m, achieved in May 2012 in Weinheim. He was part of the team that holds the Swiss record in the 4 × 100 m relay.
