= Emanuele Di Gregorio =

Italian sprinter (born 1980)

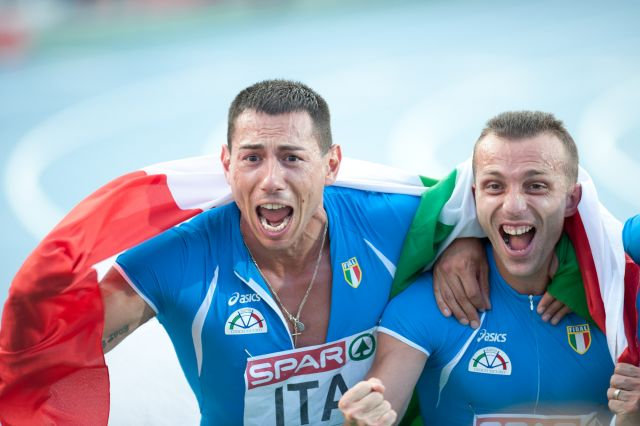
- Emanuele Di Gregorio (right) with Simone Collio at Barcelona 2010

Personal information
- Nationality: Italian
- Born: 13 December 1980 (age 45) Castellammare del Golfo, Italy
- Height: 1.73 m (5 ft 8 in)
- Weight: 64 kg (141 lb)

Sport
- Country: Italy
- Sport: Athletics
- Event: Sprint
- Club: C.S. Aeronautica Militare
- Retired: 2013

Achievements and titles
- Personal best: 100 m: 10"17 (2009)
Medal record
European Championships
Silver medal – second place	2010 Barcelona	4 x 100 m relay
European Indoor Championships
Bronze medal – third place	2009 Torino	60 m
Mediterranean Games
Gold medal – first place	2009 Pescara	4x100 m
Silver medal – second place	2009 Pescara	100 m

Emanuele Di Gregorio (born 13 December 1980 in Castellammare del Golfo, Sicily) is a track and field sprint athlete who competes internationally for Italy.

== Biography ==
Di Gregorio represented Italy at the 2008 Summer Olympics in Beijing. He competed in the 4×100 metres relay together with Fabio Cerutti, Simone Collio and Jacques Riparelli. In their qualification heat, they were disqualified and eliminated. He achieved a new personal best at the 2009 European Athletics Indoor Championships in Turin with a 6.56-second run for the 60 metres dash. A photo-finish revealed he came in third just ahead of Great Britain's Simeon Williamson (6.57).

He succeeded at the regional level with a silver medal in the 100 m at the 2009 Mediterranean Games, before adding the relay gold to his honours. He ran at the 2009 World Championships in Athletics, reaching the 100 m quarter-finals and he also helped the men's 4×100 metres relay team to sixth in the final.

He ran a personal best in the 100 m at the 2010 European Athletics Championships, finishing in 10.17 seconds into a headwind to earn himself a place in the event final. He finished seventh in his first major outdoor final. He scored his first Italian record in the 100 m relay event with the men's team, who took the silver behind France in a record time of 38.17 seconds.

== See also ==
- Italian all-time lists - 100 metres
- Italy national relay team
