= Athletics at the 2009 Summer Universiade – Men's 100 metres =

The men's 100 metres event at the 2009 Summer Universiade was held on 7–8 July.

== Medalists ==
Gold	Silver	Bronze
Rolando Palacios; Honduras	Amr Ibrahim Mostafa Seoud; Egypt	Masashi Eriguchi; Japan

== Results ==
=== Heats ===
Qualification: First 3 of each heat (Q) and the next 5 fastest (q) qualified for the quarterfinals.

Wind:
Heat 1: -0.5 m/s, Heat 2: -0.9 m/s, Heat 3: -0.8 m/s, Heat 4: -1.7 m/s, Heat 5: -0.3 m/s
Heat 6: -2.6 m/s, Heat 7: -1.0 m/s, Heat 8: -0.4 m/s, Heat 9: -0.4 m/s

Rank	Heat	Name	Nationality	Time	Notes
1	8	Amr Ibrahim Mostafa Seoud	Egypt	10.35	Q
2	8	Rytis Sakalauskas	Lithuania	10.42	Q
3	8	Catalin Câmpeanu	Romania	10.43	Q
4	5	Masashi Eriguchi	Japan	10.48	Q
5	2	Wilhelm van der Vyver	South Africa	10.51	Q
6	2	Rolando Palacios	Honduras	10.52	Q
6	9	Shintaro Kimura	Japan	10.52	Q
8	9	Sean Wroe	Australia	10.53	Q
9	9	Kael Becerra	Chile	10.55	Q
10	8	Yeo Ho-sua	South Korea	10.56	q
11	8	Gérard Kobéané	Burkina Faso	10.57	q
12	1	Konstantin Petryashov	Russia	10.61	Q
13	5	Oluseyi Smith	Canada	10.62	Q
14	5	Dany Gonçalves	Portugal	10.62	Q
15	8	Maksim Mokrousov	Russia	10.64	q
16	3	David Ambler	New Zealand	10.66	Q
16	6	Yip Siu Keung	Hong Kong	10.66	Q
18	1	Kim Min-kyun	South Korea	10.68	Q
18	8	Sun Libing	China	10.68	q
20	7	Yi Wei-Chen	Chinese Taipei	10.71	Q
21	7	Gregor Kokalovič	Slovenia	10.72	Q
22	3	Tshepang Tshube	Botswana	10.74	Q
23	1	Giovanni Tomasicchio	Italy	10.75	Q
24	5	Artur Zaczek	Poland	10.76	q
24	7	Miloš Savić	Serbia	10.76	Q
26	1	Yordan Ilinov	Bulgaria	10.77	
27	4	Dariusz Kuć	Poland	10.78	Q
28	3	Franklin Nazareno	Ecuador	10.83	Q
28	9	Jeffery Thumath	New Zealand	10.83	
30	5	Enock Sekum	Ghana	10.84	SB
31	3	Marvin Kamuingona	Namibia	10.85	SB
32	7	Apinan Sukaphai	Thailand	10.86	
33	7	Nedim Čović	Bosnia and Herzegovina	10.86	
34	2	Marko Antić	Serbia	10.89	Q
35	6	Wachara Sondee	Thailand	10.89	Q
36	5	Lu Lei	China	10.92	
37	6	Paulus Mathijssen	Netherlands Antilles	10.94	Q
38	4	Kagisho Kumbane	South Africa	10.97	Q
39	4	Okatakyie Akwasi Afrifa	Ghana	11.01	Q
40	1	Omar Al-Momani	Jordan	11.11	
40	4	Kermeliss Olonghot Ghyd	Republic of the Congo	11.11	
42	7	Ali Al-Rashdi	Oman	11.12	
43	5	Mmoloki Fredrick Seele	Botswana	11.16	
44	4	Lau Yu Leong	Hong Kong	11.18	
45	2	Lazarous Inya	Uganda	11.20	
46	2	Saša Kecman	Bosnia and Herzegovina	11.24	
47	7	Michael Guerrero	Costa Rica	11.26	SB
48	2	Ali Raza Toor	Pakistan	11.29	
49	3	Michel Al-Zinati	Lebanon	11.41	
50	5	Rogers Aheebwa	Uganda	11.57	
51	8	Mubarak Al Malik	Qatar	11.64	
52	1	Ao Chan Kit	Macau	11.69	
53	3	Tran Van Luong	Vietnam	11.70	
54	4	Elias Silumbwe	Zambia	11.73	
55	2	Ramsey Nasser	Lebanon	11.74	
56	6	Rashid Al-Musheifri	Oman	11.74	
57	9	Abdulrahman Mohammedy Al-Khaibary	Saudi Arabia	11.76	
58	2	Hamadabdullaziz Al-Shudukhi	Saudi Arabia	12.18	
59	6	Kouame Florentin Dossou Ayedjo	Benin	17.70	
	1	Roussel Muteka	Democratic Republic of the Congo	DNS	
	1	Jacob Wolfgang	Denmark	DNS	
	3	Martynas Jurgilas	Lithuania	DNS	
	3	Chukwuma Onyeaky	Nigeria	DNS	
	4	Stanley Gbagbeke	Nigeria	DNS	
	6	Jurica Grabušić	Croatia	DNS	
	6	Martin Krabbe	Denmark	DNS	
	6	Jan Schiller	Czech Republic	DNS	
	7	Eneme Sergio Mba Nso	Equatorial Guinea	DNS	
	9	Dmitrii Iliin	Kyrgyzstan	DNS	
	9	Basílio de Morães	Brazil	DNS	
	9	Dragoje Rajković	Montenegro	DNS	

=== Quarterfinals ===
Qualification: First 3 of each heat (Q) and the next 4 fastest (q) qualified for the semifinals.

Wind:
Heat 1: -0.4 m/s, Heat 2: -0.1 m/s, Heat 3: -0.4 m/s, Heat 4: -0.1 m/s

Rank	Heat	Name	Nationality	Time	Notes
1	3	Rolando Palacios	Honduras	10.37	Q
2	2	Masashi Eriguchi	Japan	10.38	Q
2	4	Oluseyi Smith	Canada	10.38	Q
4	1	Amr Ibrahim Mostafa Seoud	Egypt	10.40	Q
5	4	Shintaro Kimura	Japan	10.43	Q
6	4	Konstantin Petryashov	Russia	10.43	Q, PB
7	3	David Ambler	New Zealand	10.45	Q
8	2	Rytis Sakalauskas	Lithuania	10.46	Q
8	3	Wilhelm van der Vyver	South Africa	10.46	Q
8	4	Kael Becerra	Chile	10.46	q
11	1	Dariusz Kuć	Poland	10.50	Q
12	3	Catalin Câmpeanu	Romania	10.52	q
13	4	Sean Wroe	Australia	10.55	q
14	4	Gérard Kobéané	Burkina Faso	10.55	q
15	2	Gregor Kokalovič	Slovenia	10.56	Q
16	4	Yeo Ho-sua	South Korea	10.58	
17	2	Yip Siu Keung	Hong Kong	10.59	SB
18	3	Giovanni Tomasicchio	Italy	10.61	
19	1	Franklin Nazareno	Ecuador	10.62	Q
20	2	Miloš Savić	Serbia	10.65	
21	2	Kagisho Kumbane	South Africa	10.65	
22	1	Tshepang Tshube	Botswana	10.66	
22	1	Yi Wei-Chen	Chinese Taipei	10.66	
22	2	Artur Zaczek	Poland	10.66	
22	4	Dany Gonçalves	Portugal	10.66	
26	3	Kim Min-kyun	South Korea	10.67	
27	2	Sun Libing	China	10.69	
28	3	Maksim Mokrousov	Russia	10.71	
29	1	Wachara Sondee	Thailand	10.76	
30	3	Okatakyie Akwasi Afrifa	Ghana	10.82	
31	1	Paulus Mathijssen	Netherlands Antilles	10.93	
	1	Marko Antić	Serbia	DNS	

=== Semifinals ===
Qualification: First 4 of each semifinal qualified directly (Q) for the final.

Wind:
Heat 1: +0.1 m/s, Heat 2: +0.2 m/s

Rank	Heat	Name	Nationality	Time	Notes
1	2	Masashi Eriguchi	Japan	10.28	Q
2	1	Amr Ibrahim Mostafa Seoud	Egypt	10.30	Q
3	1	Rolando Palacios	Honduras	10.32	Q
4	2	Rytis Sakalauskas	Lithuania	10.39	Q
5	1	Konstantin Petryashov	Russia	10.40	Q, PB
6	2	David Ambler	New Zealand	10.42	Q
7	2	Oluseyi Smith	Canada	10.43	Q
8	1	Kael Becerra	Chile	10.44	Q, SB
8	2	Catalin Câmpeanu	Romania	10.44	
10	2	Wilhelm van der Vyver	South Africa	10.46	
11	1	Dariusz Kuć	Poland	10.48	
12	1	Shintaro Kimura	Japan	10.49	
13	2	Gregor Kokalovič	Slovenia	10.52	PB
14	1	Gérard Kobéané	Burkina Faso	10.53	
15	2	Sean Wroe	Australia	10.59	
16	1	Franklin Nazareno	Ecuador	10.63	

=== Final ===
Wind: -0.7 m/s

Rank	Lane	Name	Nationality	Time	Notes
1st place, gold medalist(s)	5	Rolando Palacios	Honduras	10.30	
2nd place, silver medalist(s)	6	Amr Ibrahim Mostafa Seoud	Egypt	10.31	
3rd place, bronze medalist(s)	4	Masashi Eriguchi	Japan	10.33	
4	1	Kael Becerra	Chile	10.38	SB
5	3	Rytis Sakalauskas	Lithuania	10.41	
6	8	Konstantin Petryashov	Russia	10.42	
7	7	David Ambler	New Zealand	10.44	
8	2	Oluseyi Smith	Canada	10.48	
