= Athletics at the 2009 Summer Universiade – Men's 4 × 100 metres relay =

The men's 4 × 100 metres relay event at the 2009 Summer Universiade was held on 11–12 July.

== Medalists ==
Gold	Silver	Bronze
Russia; Maksim Mokrousov; Ivan Teplykh; Roman Smirnov; Konstantin Petryashov	Poland; Robert Kubaczyk; Artur Zaczek; Kamil Masztak; Dariusz Kuć	South Africa; Leigh Julius; Thuso Mpuang; Kagisho Kumbane; Wilhelm van der Vyver

== Results ==
=== Heats ===
Qualification: First 3 teams of each heat (Q) plus the next 2 fastest (q) qualified for the final.

Rank	Heat	Nation	Athletes	Time	Notes
1	2	Russia	Maksim Mokrousov, Ivan Teplykh, Roman Smirnov, Konstantin Petryashov	39.21	Q
2	1	South Africa	Leigh Julius, Thuso Mpuang, Kagisho Kumbane, Wilhelm van der Vyver	39.34	Q
3	1	Poland	Robert Kubaczyk, Artur Zaczek, Kamil Masztak, Dariusz Kuć	39.39	Q
4	1	Thailand	Apinan Sukaphai, Siriroj Darasuriyong, Atthapol Prajammoon, Wachara Sondee	39.93	Q
4	2	Lithuania	Egidijus Dilys, Rytis Sakalauskas, Žilvinas Adomavičius, Aivaras Pranckevičius	39.93	Q, SB
6	1	Hong Kong	Tang Yik Chun, Yip Siu Keung, Leung Ki Ho, Lau Yu Leong	40.19	q
7	2	Canada	Sam Effah, Gavin Smellie, Oluseyi Smith, Daniel Harper	40.27	Q
8	1	China	You Cheng, Sun Libing, Zheng Xiao, Lu Lei	40.66	q
9	2	Botswana	Edward Jele Ofentse, Tshepang Tshube, Mompati Tsiang Kabelo, Mmoloki Fredrick Seele	41.51	
9	2	Uganda	Ricky Achila Martin, Lazarous Inya, Geofrey Lukwiya Akena, Alli Ngaimoko	41.51	
11	2	Macau	Ao Chan Kit, Wong Wai In, Chan Chon In, Wong Cheok Wa	44.91	
	1	Japan	Masashi Eriguchi, Shintaro Kimura, Mitsuhiro Abiko, Hitoshi Saito	DQ	
	2	Ghana	Enock Sekum, Okatakyie Akwasi Afrifa, Eric Goloe, Christopher Kofi Gyapong	DQ	
	1	Serbia		DNS	
	2	Denmark		DNS	

=== Final ===
Rank	Lane	Nation	Athletes	Time	Notes
1st place, gold medalist(s)	6	Russia	Maksim Mokrousov, Ivan Teplykh, Roman Smirnov, Konstantin Petryashov	39.21	
2nd place, silver medalist(s)	4	Poland	Robert Kubaczyk, Artur Zaczek, Kamil Masztak, Dariusz Kuć	39.33	
3rd place, bronze medalist(s)	3	South Africa	Leigh Julius, Thuso Mpuang, Kagisho Kumbane, Wilhelm van der Vyver	39.52	
4	7	Thailand	Apinan Sukaphai, Siriroj Darasuriyong, Atthapol Prajammoon, Wachara Sondee	39.70	
5	5	Lithuania	Egidijus Dilys, Rytis Sakalauskas, Žilvinas Adomavičius, Aivaras Pranckevičius	39.81	SB
6	2	Hong Kong	Tang Yik Chun, Yip Siu Keung, Leung Ki Ho, Lau Yu Leong	40.60	
	2	China	You Cheng, Sun Libing, Zheng Xiao, Lu Lei	DNF	
	8	Canada		DNS	
