= 2009 European Team Championships Super League =

Athletics team competitions

- Host city: (Portugal) Leiria
- Nations: 12
- Events: 40 (20 men, 20 women)
- Dates: 20–21 June 2009
- Main venue: Estádio Dr. Magalhães Pessoa

The 2009 European Team Championships Super League was the Super League of the 1st edition of the European Team Championships (European Athletics Team Championships from 2013 edition), the 2009 European Team Championships, which took place on 20 and 21 June 2009 in Leiria, Portugal. A couple of rules were introduced applying specifically to this competition, some of which were discarded or altered for the subsequent editions. See the main article for more details.

== Final standings ==
Pos	Country	Pts
1	Germany	327.5
2	Russia	308
3	Great Britain	304
4	France	302
5	Poland	290
6	Italy	279
7	Ukraine	267
8	Spain	258
9	Greece	217
10	Czech Republic	214.5
11	Portugal	201
12	Sweden	139

== Men's results ==
=== 100 metres ===
June 20

Wind:
Heat A: -0.3 m/s, Heat B: +0.2 m/s

Rank	Heat	Name	Nationality	Time	Notes	Points
1	B	Dwain Chambers	Great Britain	10.07		12
2	A	Francis Obikwelu	Portugal	10.20	SB	11
3	B	Emanuele Di Gregorio	Italy	10.21	PB	10
4	B	Martial Mbandjock	France	10.27		9
5	B	Dariusz Kuć	Poland	10.35		8
6	B	Stefan Schwab	Germany	10.40		7
7	A	Ángel David Rodríguez	Spain	10.44	SB	6
8	A	Kostyantyn Vasyukov	Ukraine	10.44		5
9	A	Aggelos Aggelakis	Greece	10.48	=PB	4
10	A	Stefan Tärnhuvud	Sweden	10.49		3
11	A	Jan Schiller	Czech Republic	10.49		2
12	B	Roman Smirnov	Russia	10.60		1

=== 200 metres ===
June 21

Wind:
Heat A: -0.4 m/s, Heat B: -0.9 m/s

Rank	Heat	Name	Nationality	Time	Notes	Points
1	B	Dwain Chambers	Great Britain	20.55		12
2	A	Arnaldo Abrantes	Portugal	20.62	SB	11
3	B	Martial Mbandjock	France	20.67	PB	10
4	B	Alexander Kosenkow	Germany	20.82		9
5	A	Ángel David Rodríguez	Spain	20.88	SB	8
6	A	Dmytro Ostrovskyy	Ukraine	20.95		7
7	B	Roman Smirnov	Russia	20.97		6
8	A	Simone Collio	Italy	21.04		5
9	A	Lykourgos-Stefanos Tsakonas	Greece	21.08	PB	4
10	A	Kamil Masztak	Poland	21.14		3
11	B	Jiří Vojtík	Czech Republic	21.24		2
12	B	Fredrik Johansson	Sweden	21.49		1

=== 400 metres ===
June 20

Rank	Heat	Name	Nationality	Time	Notes	Points
1	B	Timothy Benjamin	Great Britain	45.57		12
2	B	Johan Wissman	Sweden	45.81	SB	11
3	B	Kamghe Gaba	Germany	45.88	SB	10
4	A	Teddy Venel	France	46.13	SB	9
5	B	Denis Alekseyev	Russia	46.14	SB	8
6	B	Marcin Marciniszyn	Poland	46.22		7
7	A	Petros Kiriakidis	Greece	46.40		6
8	A	Rudolf Götz	Czech Republic	46.51		5
9	A	João Ferreira	Portugal	46.66	PB	4
10	B	Myhaylo Knysh	Ukraine	46.74		3
11	A	Mark Ujakpor	Spain	46.79		2
12	A	Andrea Barberi	Italy	46.88		1

=== 800 metres ===
June 21

Rank	Name	Nationality	Time	Notes	Points
1	Miguel Quesada	Spain	1:47.76		12
2	Oleksandr Osmolovych	Ukraine	1:48.05		11
3	Jeff Lastennet	France	1:48.29		10
4	Colin McCourt	Great Britain	1:48.41		9
5	Konstadinos Nakopoulos	Greece	1:48.60		8
6	Lukas Rifesser	Italy	1:48.76		7
7	Sebastian Keiner	Germany	1:49.12		6
8	Jakub Holuša	Czech Republic	1:49.22		5
9	Adam Kszczot	Poland	1:49.41		4
10	Fábio Gonçalves	Portugal	1:49.41	PB	3
11	Stepan Poistogov	Russia	1:49.56		2
12	Mattias Claesson	Sweden	1:49.57		1

=== 1500 metres ===
June 20

Rank	Name	Nationality	Time	Notes	Points
1	Rui Silva	Portugal	3:42.07		12
2	Diego Ruíz	Spain	3:42.54		11
3	Yoann Kowal	France	3:42.73		10
4	Stefan Eberhardt	Germany	3:43.02		9
5	Tom Lancashire	Great Britain	3:43.19		8
6	Marcin Lewandowski	Poland	3:44.39		7
7	Stefano La Rosa	Italy	3:44.52		6
8	Oleksandr Borysyuk	Ukraine	3:44.52		5
9	Rizak Dirshe	Sweden	3:44.54	SB	4
10	Aleksandr Krivchonkov	Russia	3:44.58	=SB	3
11	Tomáš Belada	Czech Republic	3:47.41		2
12	Vasilios Papaioannou	Greece	3:51.23		1

=== 3000 metres ===
June 21

Rank	Name	Nationality	Time	Notes	Points
1	Jesús España	Spain	8:01.73		12
2	Sergey Ivanov	Russia	8:02.18		11
3	Daniele Meucci	Italy	8:02.22		10
4	Nick McCormick	Great Britain	8:03.45		9
5	Arne Gabius	Germany	8:09.00		8
6	Manuel Damião	Portugal	8:12.30		7
7	Łukasz Parszczyński	Poland	8:19.75		6
8	Milan Kocourek	Czech Republic	9:06.80		5
9	Vasilios Papaioannou	Greece	SA3		4
10	Olle Walleräng	Sweden	SA2		3
11	Mourad Amdouni	France	SA1		2
	Vitaliy Shafar	Ukraine	DQ	R163.2	0

=== 5000 metres ===
June 20

Rank	Name	Nationality	Time	Notes	Points
1	Mo Farah	Great Britain	13:43.01		12
2	Carles Castillejo	Spain	13:49.54		11
3	Serhiy Lebid	Ukraine	13:59.85		10
4	Yevgeniy Rybakov	Russia	14:01.78	PB	9
5	Rui Pedro Silva	Portugal	14:08.66		8
6	Andrea Lalli	Italy	14:27.60		7
7	Noureddine Smaïl	France	14:30.52		6
8	Christian Glatting	Germany	14:32.17		5
9	Jakub Živec	Czech Republic	14:51.56		4
10	Marcin Chabowski	Poland	SA3		3
11	Oskar Käck	Sweden	SA2		2
12	Adonios Papadonis	Greece	SA1		1

=== 3000 metres steeplechase ===
June 21

Rank	Name	Nationality	Time	Notes	Points
1	Mustafa Mohamed	Sweden	8:28.09		12
2	Vincent Zouaoui-Dandrieux	France	8:32.05	SB	11
3	Ildar Minshin	Russia	8:34.06	SB	10
4	Eliseo Martín	Spain	8:39.31		9
5	Filmon Ghirmai	Germany	8:41.54		8
6	Tomasz Szymkowiak	Poland	8:52.71		7
7	Petr Mikulenka	Czech Republic	8:57.33		6
8	Stuart Stokes	Great Britain	9:05.13		5
9	Vadym Slobodenyuk	Ukraine	9:12.43		4
10	Matteo Villani	Italy	SA3		3
11	Alexandros Litsis	Greece	SA2		2
12	Alberto Paulo	Portugal	SA1		1

=== 110 metres hurdles ===
June 21

Wind:
Heat A: +0.4 m/s, Heat B: +1.3 m/s

Rank	Heat	Name	Nationality	Time	Notes	Points
1	B	Andy Turner	Great Britain	13.42		12
2	B	Jackson Quiñónez	Spain	13.53	SB	11
3	B	Matthias Bühler	Germany	13.57		10
4	B	Ladji Doucouré	France	13.65		9
5	A	Yevgeniy Borisov	Russia	13.71	SB	8
6	B	Artur Noga	Poland	13.78	SB	7
7	A	Robert Kronberg	Sweden	13.87	SB	6
8	B	Emanuele Abate	Italy	13.89		5
9	A	Oleksandr Vahnyakov	Ukraine	14.03		4
10	A	Stanislav Sajdok	Czech Republic	14.19		3
11	A	Nikolaos Filandarakis	Greece	14.19		2
12	A	Luís Sá	Portugal	14.33		1

=== 400 metres hurdles ===
June 20

Rank	Heat	Name	Nationality	Time	Notes	Points
1	B	Dai Greene	Great Britain	49.26		12
2	A	Fadil Bellaabouss	France	49.91	SB	11
3	B	Periklis Iakovakis	Greece	50.09		10
4	B	Aleksandr Derevyagin	Russia	50.40		9
5	B	Stanislav Melnykov	Ukraine	50.62		8
6	B	Thomas Goller	Germany	50.80		7
7	A	Josef Prorok	Czech Republic	51.05		6
8	B	Marek Plawgo	Poland	51.06		5
9	A	Nicola Cascella	Italy	51.16	SB	4
10	A	Edivaldo Monteiro	Portugal	51.22		3
11	A	Ignacio Sarmiento	Spain	52.14		2
12	A	Thomas Nikitin	Sweden	52.76		1

=== 4 × 100 metres relay ===
June 20

Rank	Heat	Nation	Athletes	Time	Note	Points
1	A	Italy	Giovanni Tomasicchio, Simone Collio, Emanuele Di Gregorio, Fabio Cerutti	38.77		12
2	B	Germany	Stefan Schwab, Till Helmke, Alexander Kosenkow, Martin Keller	38.78		11
3	B	France	Ronald Pognon, Martial Mbandjock, Eddy De Lépine, Christophe Lemaitre	38.80		10
4	A	Portugal	Dany Gonçalves, Arnaldo Abrantes, João Ferreira, Francis Obikwelu	39.02	NR	9
5	B	Poland	Robert Kubaczyk, Marcin Jędrusiński, Kamil Masztak, Dariusz Kuć	39.11		8
6	B	Russia	Maksim Mokrousov, Ivan Teplykh, Roman Smirnov, Konstantin Petryashov	39.12		7
7	A	Spain	Orkatz Beitia, Ángel David Rodríguez, Josué Mena, Álvaro Aljarilla	39.88		6
8	A	Greece	Panagiotis Sarris, Lykourgos-Stefanos Tsakonas, Georgios Koutsotheodorou, Aggelos Aggelakis	40.37		5
9	A	Sweden	Jens Löfgren, Stefan Tärnhuvud, Erik Karlsson, Oskar Åberg	40.58		4
10	B	Great Britain	Simeon Williamson, Tyrone Edgar, Rikki Fifton, Harry Aikines-Aryeetey	41.91		3
	A	Czech Republic	Libor Žilka, Jiří Vojtík, Jan Schiller, Jan Veleba	DQ	R170.14	0
	B	Ukraine	Serhiy Sahutkin, Kostyantyn Vasyukov, Anatoliy Dovhal, Dmytro Ostrovskyy	DNF		0

=== 4 × 400 metres relay ===
June 21

Rank	Heat	Nation	Athletes	Time	Note	Points
1	B	Great Britain	Conrad Williams, Robert Tobin, Richard Strachan, Timothy Benjamin	3:00.82	EL	12
2	B	Germany	Miguel Rigau, Kamghe Gaba, Simon Kirch, Thomas Schneider	3:02.30		11
3	B	Russia	Aleksandr Derevyagin, Valentin Kruglyakov, Konstantin Svechkar, Denis Alekseyev	3:02.42		10
4	B	Poland	Piotr Klimczak, Kacper Kozłowski, Marcin Marciniszyn, Jan Ciepiela	3:03.54		9
5	B	France	Yannick Fonsat, Teddy Venel, Mame-Ibra Anne, Nicolas Fillon	3:05.41		8
6	A	Ukraine	Oleksiy Rachkovskyy, Stanislav Melnykov, Volodymyr Burakov, Myhaylo Knysh	3:05.84		7
7	B	Italy	Isalbet Juarez, Domenico Rao, Marco Vistalli, Domenico Fontana	3:06.35		6
8	A	Greece	Petros Kiriakidis, Dimitrios Gravalos, Padeleimon Melahrinoudis, Periklis Iakovakis	3:07.11		5
9	A	Czech Republic	Rudolf Götz, Petr Szetei, Pavel Jirán, Petr Klofáč	3:07.23		4
10	A	Spain	Mark Ujakpor, Santiago Ezquerro, Aitor Martín, Marc Orozco	3:07.79		3
11	A	Portugal	Edivaldo Monteiro, António Rodrigues, Bruno Gualberto, João Ferreira	3:08.08		2
12	A	Sweden	Fredrik Johansson, Andreas Mokdasi, Thomas Nikitin, Fredrik Hallinder	3:08.35		1

=== High jump ===
June 20

Rank	Name	Nationality	2.05	2.15	2.20	2.24	2.28	2.31	2.33	Result	Notes	Points
1	Yuriy Krymarenko	Ukraine	o	o	o	o	o	xo	xxx	2.31	SB	12
2	Jaroslav Bába	Czech Republic	–	o	o	o	xo	xo	xx	2.31	=SB	11
3	Aleksandr Shustov	Russia	–	–	o	o	xxo	xo	x	2.31	=PB	10
4	Linus Thörnblad	Sweden	–	–	o	o	o	xxx		2.28		9
5	Grzegorz Sposób	Poland	o	o	xo	o	o	xxx		2.28	SB	8
6	Konstadinos Baniotis	Greece	–	o	o	o	xo	xxx		2.28	PB	7
7	Javier Bermejo	Spain	o	o	o	o	xxo	xxx		2.28	=PB	6
8	Andrea Bettinelli	Italy	–	o	xo	o	xxx			2.24		5
9	Samson Oni	Great Britain	–	o	xo	xxo	x			2.24	SB	4
10	Fabrice Saint-Jean	France	o	o	xxx					2.15		2.5
10	Raul Spank	Germany	–	o	xxx					2.15		2.5
12	Paulo Gonçalves	Portugal	o	xxx						2.05		1

=== Pole vault ===
June 21

Rank	Name	Nationality	5.00	5.25	5.35	5.45	5.55	5.65	5.70	5.75	5.80	5.85	5.90	6.01	6.10	Result	Notes	Points
1	Renaud Lavillenie	France	–	–	o	–	o	–	o	–	xxo	–	o	xo	x	6.01	WL, NR	12
2	Malte Mohr	Germany	–	–	o	–	xo	o	–	xo	–	xx				5.75		11
3	Łukasz Michalski	Poland	–	–	o	–	o	o	o	–	xxx					5.70		10
4	Konstadinos Filippidis	Greece	o	o	o	o	xxo	xo	–	x						5.65	SB	9
5	Sergey Kucheryanu	Russia	–	xxo	–	–	o	–	x–	x						5.55		8
6	Jan Kudlička	Czech Republic	–	xo	–	o	xxo	–	x							5.55	SB	6.5
6	Steven Lewis	Great Britain	–	–	xo	–	xxo	x								5.55	SB	6.5
8	Alhaji Jeng	Sweden	–	–	–	xo	–									5.45		5
9	Giorgio Piantella	Italy	o	o	xo	xo	xx									5.45		4
10	Edi Maia	Portugal	o	xo	o	xxx										5.35	PB	3
11	Alberto Martínez	Spain	xxo	o	xo	x										5.35	SB	2
12	Denys Yurchenko	Ukraine	–	xo	–	xxx										5.25		1

=== Long jump ===
June 20

Rank	Name	Nationality	#1	#2	#3	#4	Result	Notes	Points
1	Eusebio Cáceres	Spain	7.87	8.00	7.77	x	8.00	PB	12
2	Nelson Évora	Portugal	7.66	7.86	7.80	7.94	7.94	=SB	11
3	Louis Tsatoumas	Greece	7.84	7.91	7.84	x	7.91		10
4	Roman Novotný	Czech Republic	7.88	7.68	x	7.51	7.88		9
5	Chris Tomlinson	Great Britain	7.61	7.78	7.71		7.78		8
6	Aleksandr Menkov	Russia	7.78	7.53	7.69		7.78	PB	7
7	Salim Sdiri	France	7.69	7.74			7.74		6
8	Viktor Kuznyetsov	Ukraine	7.35	7.73			7.73		5
9	Michel Tornéus	Sweden	x	7.62			7.62		4
10	Nils Winter	Germany	7.58	7.56			7.58		3
11	Marcin Starzak	Poland	x	7.51			7.51		2
12	Stefano Tremigliozzi	Italy	6.99	x			6.99		1

=== Triple jump ===
June 21

Rank	Name	Nationality	#1	#2	#3	#4	Result	Notes	Points
1	Nelson Évora	Portugal	17.47	16.95	17.59	x	17.59		12
2	Phillips Idowu	Great Britain	17.48	17.50	x	17.36	17.50		11
3	Fabrizio Schembri	Italy	16.37	17.64	16.62	16.34	16.64		10
4	Mykola Savolaynen	Ukraine	16.51	15.98	16.32	16.18	16.51		9
5	Karl Taillepierre	France	14.36	16.48	x		16.48		8
6	Dimitrios Tsiamis	Greece	16.47	16.38	x		16.47		7
7	Andrés Capellán	Spain	15.87	16.22			16.22		6
8	Aleksey Fyodorov	Russia	16.09	15.94			16.09		5
9	Charles Friedek	Germany	x	16.09			16.09		4
10	Paweł Kruhlik	Poland	15.71	15.99			15.99		3
11	Tomáš Cholenský	Czech Republic	15.56	15.11			15.56		2
12	Andreas Otterling	Sweden	15.35	x			15.35		1

=== Shot put ===
June 20

Rank	Name	Nationality	#1	#2	#3	#4	Result	Notes	Points
1	Tomasz Majewski	Poland	20.09	20.67	20.65	20.81	20.81		12
2	Manuel Martínez	Spain	20.39	20.21	20.20	19.93	20.39	SB	11
3	Antonín Žalský	Czech Republic	18.67	19.38	20.11	20.10	20.11	SB	10
4	Peter Sack	Germany	19.70	x	19.76	x	19.76		9
5	Yves Niaré	France	19.54	x	19.50		19.54		8
6	Carl Myerscough	Great Britain	18.92	19.54	x		19.54		7
7	Andriy Semenov	Ukraine	19.18	19.37			19.37		6
8	Anton Lyuboslavskiy	Russia	19.26	x			19.26		5
9	Marco Fortes	Portugal	19.07	18.88			19.07		4
10	Michalis Stamatogiannis	Greece	17.71	18.62			18.62		3
11	Paolo Dal Soglio	Italy	17.73	x			17.73		2
12	Mats Olsson	Sweden	17.03	16.58			17.03		1

=== Discus throw ===
June 21

Rank	Name	Nationality	#1	#2	#3	#4	Result	Notes	Points
1	Piotr Małachowski	Poland	62.76	x	66.24	62.14	66.24		12
2	Robert Harting	Germany	61.93	x	64.83	65.40	65.40		11
3	Mario Pestano	Spain	60.04	61.58	63.74	64.66	64.66		10
4	Oleksiy Semenov	Ukraine	59.79	59.04	58.78	x	59.79		9
5	Giovanni Faloci	Italy	52.29	59.77	59.10		59.77		8
6	Stefanos Konstas	Greece	57.04	59.29	58.05		59.29	SB	7
7	Abdul Buhari	Great Britain	x	58.79			58.79	SB	6
8	Miroslav Pudivítr	Czech Republic	x	57.22			57.22		5
9	Bogdan Pishchalnikov	Russia	53.42	57.07			57.07		4
10	Yannick Gunzle	France	x	52.71			52.71		3
11	Jorge Grave	Portugal	x	49.55			49.55		2
12	Ulf Ankarling	Sweden	49.26	x			49.26		1

=== Hammer throw ===
June 20

Rank	Name	Nationality	#1	#2	#3	#4	Result	Notes	Points
1	Nicola Vizzoni	Italy	76.44	78.15	73.61	77.79	78.15		12
2	Szymon Ziółkowski	Poland	x	75.13	74.02	78.01	78.01	SB	11
3	Markus Esser	Germany	75.72	75.46	x	77.62	77.62		10
4	Artem Rubanko	Ukraine	x	76.29	75.54	x	76.29		9
5	Lukáš Melich	Czech Republic	x	72.38	74.72		74.72		8
6	Alexandros Papadimitriou	Greece	71.58	72.68	72.46		72.68		7
7	Javier Cienfuegos	Spain	x	71.03			71.03		6
8	Aleksey Zagornyi	Russia	69.91	70.99			70.99		5
9	Jérôme Bortoluzzi	France	69.51	68.84			69.51		4
10	Mattias Jons	Sweden	67.54	x			67.54		3
11	Dário Manso	Portugal	66.62	x			66.62		2
12	Andy Frost	Great Britain	62.07	62.59			62.59		1

=== Javelin throw ===
June 21

Rank	Name	Nationality	#1	#2	#3	#4	Result	Notes	Points
1	Mark Frank	Germany	77.58	x	76.30	78.63	78.63		12
2	Ilya Korotkov	Russia	74.83	76.86	77.56	73.18	77.56		11
3	Igor Janik	Poland	x	76.48	74.53	74.61	76.48		10
4	Roman Avramenko	Ukraine	x	74.81	75.25	x	75.25		9
5	Spyridon Lebesis	Greece	74.21	x	72.44		74.21		8
6	Petr Frydrych	Czech Republic	74.11	x	72.48		74.11		7
7	Rafael Baraza	Spain	72.03	73.08			73.08		6
8	Mervyn Luckwell	Great Britain	71.91	72.40			72.40		5
9	Berenguer Demerval	France	68.61	71.16			71.16		4
10	Elias Leal	Portugal	68.62	x			68.62		3
11	Jonas Lohse	Sweden	63.77	68.28			68.28		2
12	Roberto Bertolini	Italy	66.70	67.37			67.37		1

== Women's results ==
=== 100 metres ===
June 20

Wind:
Heat A: +1.1 m/s, Heat B: +0.6 m/s

Rank	Heat	Name	Nationality	Time	Notes	Points
1	B	Emily Freeman	Great Britain	11.42		12
2	B	Nataliya Pohrebnyak	Ukraine	11.49		11
3	A	Carima Louami	France	11.50	SB	10
4	A	Maria Aurora Salvagno	Italy	11.51	PB	9
5	B	Marika Popowicz	Poland	11.51		8
6	B	Marion Wagner	Germany	11.51		7
7	B	Yevgeniya Polyakova	Russia	11.55		6
8	A	Sónia Tavares	Portugal	11.57		5
9	B	Georgia Kokloni	Greece	11.58		4
10	A	Lena Berntsson	Sweden	11.73		3
11	A	Kateřina Čechová	Czech Republic	11.81		2
12	A	Amparo María Cotán	Spain	11.97		1

=== 200 metres ===
June 21

Wind:
Heat A: -0.4 m/s, Heat B: 0.0 m/s

Rank	Heat	Name	Nationality	Time	Notes	Points
1	B	Yuliya Gushchina	Russia	23.01		12
2	B	Marta Jeschke	Poland	23.34		11
3	B	Christine Ohuruogu	Great Britain	23.40		10
4	A	Muriel Hurtis-Houairi	France	23.53		9
5	B	Vincenza Calì	Italy	23.62		8
6	B	Cathleen Tschirch	Germany	23.71		7
7	A	Sónia Tavares	Portugal	23.71	SB	6
8	A	Estela García	Spain	23.99		5
9	A	Maria Karastamati	Greece	24.09		4
10	A	Lena Berntsson	Sweden	24.35		3
11	A	Kateřina Čechová	Czech Republic	24.41		2
	B	Yelyzaveta Bryzhina	Ukraine	DNF		0

=== 400 metres ===
June 20

Rank	Heat	Name	Nationality	Time	Notes	Points
1	B	Libania Grenot	Italy	51.16	SB	12
2	A	Lyudmila Litvinova	Russia	51.23		11
3	B	Nataliya Pyhyda	Ukraine	51.86		10
4	B	Lee McConnell	Great Britain	51.92		9
5	B	Sorina Nwachukwu	Germany	51.99	PB	8
6	B	Symphora Béhi	France	52.88		7
7	A	Jolanta Wójcik	Poland	53.82		6
8	A	Aauri Bokesa	Spain	53.94	PB	5
9	B	Agni Derveni	Greece	54.39		4
10	A	Jitka Bartoničková	Czech Republic	54.49		3
11	A	Maria Carmo Tavares	Portugal	55.09		2
12	A	Moa Hjelmer	Sweden	56.93		1

=== 800 metres ===
June 20

Rank	Name	Nationality	Time	Notes	Points
1	Yuliya Krevsun	Ukraine	1:58.62	WL	12
2	Yekaterina Kostetskaya	Russia	1:59.43	SB	11
3	Élodie Guégan	France	1:59.79	SB	10
4	Hannah England	Great Britain	1:59.79	PB	9
5	Lenka Masná	Czech Republic	2:00.10	PB	8
6	Jana Hartmann	Germany	2:00.71	PB	7
7	Elisa Cusma Piccione	Italy	2:00.93		6
8	Eleni Filandra	Greece	2:01.17	PB	5
9	Irene Alfonso	Spain	2:01.63		4
10	Sandra Teixeira	Portugal	2:02.00	SB	3
11	Renata Pliś	Poland	2:02.44	PB	2
12	Sofia Öberg	Sweden	2:04.36	PB	1

=== 1500 metres ===
June 21

Rank	Name	Nationality	Time	Notes	Points
~~1~~	Anna Alminova	Russia	~~4:07.59~~	DQ (doping)	0
1	Nuria Fernández	Spain	4:08.00		12
2	Elisa Cusma Piccione	Italy	4:08.72	PB	11
3	Hannah England	Great Britain	4:09.25		10
4	Anna Mishchenko	Ukraine	4:10.34	SB	9
5	Lidia Chojecka	Poland	4:11.71		8
6	Sara Moreira	Portugal	4:12.94	PB	7
7	Laurane Picoche	France	4:15.13		6
8	Maria Kladou	Greece	4:18.29	PB	5
9	Ulrika Johansson	Sweden	4:18.77		4
10	Denise Krebs	Germany	4:21.65		3
11	Tereza Čapková	Czech Republic	4:22.33		2

=== 3000 metres ===
June 20

Rank	Name	Nationality	Time	Notes	Points
1	Gulnara Galkina-Samitova	Russia	8:46.88		12
2	Sylwia Ejdys	Poland	8:58.26	PB	11
3	Inês Monteiro	Portugal	9:00.83		10
4	Stephanie Twell	Great Britain	9:09.65		9
5	Élodie Olivarès	France	9:14.94		8
6	Federica Dal Ri	Italy	9:20.11		7
7	Tetyana Holovchenko	Ukraine	9:23.36		6
8	Maria Kladou	Greece	9:53.25		5
9	Charlotte Schönbeck	Sweden	10:02.22		4
10	Lenka Všetečková	Czech Republic	SA2		3
	Natalia Rodríguez	Spain	DQ	R125.5	0
	Simret Restle	Germany	DNF		0

=== 5000 metres ===
June 21

Rank	Name	Nationality	Time	Notes	Points
1	Dolores Checa	Spain	15:28.87		12
2	Silvia Weissteiner	Italy	15:31.33		11
3	Sabrina Mockenhaupt	Germany	15:37.67		10
4	Natalya Medvedeva	Russia	15:44.30	PB	9
5	Dulce Félix	Portugal	15:47.37	PB	8
6	Christelle Daunay	France	15:51.47		7
7	Laura Kenney	Great Britain	15:53.29		6
8	Agnieszka Ciołek	Poland	15:59.69	PB	5
9	Ida Nilsson	Sweden	16:00.31		4
10	Petra Kamínková	Czech Republic	SA3		3
11	Tetyana Filonyuk	Ukraine	SA2		2
12	Maria Pardalou	Greece	SA1		1

=== 3000 metres steeplechase ===
June 20

Rank	Name	Nationality	Time	Notes	Points
1	Antje Möldner	Germany	9:32.65		12
2	Sophie Duarte	France	9:33.63	SB	11
3	Yelena Sidorchenkova	Russia	9:36.88		10
4	Sara Moreira	Portugal	9:43.99		9
5	Helen Clitheroe	Great Britain	9:44.67	SB	8
6	Rosa Morató	Spain	9:48.40	SB	7
7	Eirini Kokkinariou	Greece	9:52.82		6
8	Katarzyna Kowalska	Poland	9:58.54		5
9	Valentyna Horpynych	Ukraine	10:04.13		4
10	Emma Qualia	Italy	SA3		3
11	Ulrika Johansson	Sweden	SA2		2
12	Marcela Lustigová	Czech Republic	SA1		1

=== 100 metres hurdles ===
June 21

Wind:
Heat A: +0.3 m/s, Heat B: +0.6 m/s

Rank	Heat	Name	Nationality	Time	Notes	Points
1	B	Lucie Škrobáková	Czech Republic	12.94	SB	12
2	B	Yuliya Kondakova	Russia	12.94	SB	11
3	B	Olena Krasovska	Ukraine	13.02		10
4	B	Carolin Nytra	Germany	13.08		9
5	B	Sandra Gomis	France	13.13	=PB	8
6	A	Joanna Kocielnik	Poland	13.16	SB	7
7	B	Glory Alozie	Spain	13.40		6
8	A	Francesca Doveri	Italy	13.41	PB	5
9	A	Flora Redoumi	Greece	13.59		4
10	A	Eva Vital	Portugal	13.66	PB	3
11	A	Phyllis Agbo	Great Britain	13.73	SB	2
12	A	Emma Magnusson	Sweden	13.93	SB	1

=== 400 metres hurdles ===
June 20

Rank	Heat	Name	Nationality	Time	Notes	Points
1	B	Anna Jesień	Poland	54.82		12
2	B	Anastasiya Rabchenyuk	Ukraine	55.05		11
3	B	Zuzana Hejnová	Czech Republic	55.29	SB	10
4	B	Eilidh Child	Great Britain	55.48		9
5	A	Jonna Tilgner	Germany	56.45	SB	8
6	B	Aurore Kassambara	France	56.79		7
7	A	Benedetta Ceccarelli	Italy	57.12	SB	6
8	B	Yekaterina Bikert	Russia	58.31		5
9	A	Laia Forcadell	Spain	58.50		4
10	A	Ulrika Johansson	Sweden	58.56		3
11	A	Hristina Hantzi-Neag	Greece	1:00.87		2
	A	Patrícia Lopes	Portugal	DQ	R 163.3	0

=== 4 × 100 metres relay ===
June 20

Rank	Heat	Nation	Athletes	Time	Note	Points
1	B	Russia	Yevgeniya Polyakova, Natalya Rusakova, Yuliya Gushchina, Yuliya Chermoshanskaya	43.35		12
2	B	Great Britain	Laura Turner, Kadi-Ann Thomas, Emily Freeman, Joice Maduaka	43.44		11
3	B	Germany	Katja Wakan, Anne Möllinger, Cathleen Tschirch, Marion Wagner	43.57		10
4	B	Ukraine	Nataliya Pohrebnyak, Iryna Shtanhyeyeva, Mariya Ryemyen, Yelizaveta Bryzhina	43.60		9
5	B	Poland	Iwona Ziółkowska, Marta Jeschke, Marika Popowicz, Iwona Brzezińska	44.04		8
6	A	Italy	Anita Pistone, Vincenza Calì, Doris Tomasini, Maria Aurora Salvagno	44.09		7
7	A	Portugal	Eva Vital, Naide Gomes, Carla Tavares, Sónia Tavares	44.70	NR	6
8	A	Greece	Maria Gatou, Maria Karastamati, Andriana Ferra, Georgia Kokloni	44.75		5
9	A	Sweden	Emma Rienas, Lena Berntsson, Julia Skugge, Isabelle Eurenius	45.22		4
10	A	Czech Republic	Iveta Mazáčová, Lucie Škrobáková, Pavla Hřivnová, Kateřina Čechová	45.27		3
11	A	Spain	Plácida Martínez, Estela García, Amparo María Cotán, Glory Alozie	45.35		2
	B	France	Carima Louami, Muriel Hurtis-Houairi, Lina Jacques-Sébastien, Myriam Soumaré	DQ	R170.14	0

=== 4 × 400 metres relay ===
June 21

Rank	Heat	Nation	Athletes	Time	Note	Points
1	B	Russia	Yelena Voinova, Tatyana Firova, Anastasiya Kapachinskaya, Lyudmila Litvinova	3:25.25	EL	12
2	B	Italy	Daniela Reina, Maria Enrica Spacca, Marta Milani, Libania Grenot	3:28.77		11
3	B	Great Britain	Vicky Barr, Eilidh Child, Jennifer Meadows, Lee McConnell	3:29.29		10
4	B	Germany	Sorina Nwachukwu, Claudia Hoffmann, Jonna Tilgner, Florence Ekpo-Umoh	3:29.31		9
5	B	France	Solen Désert-Mariller, Thélia Sigère, Aurélie Kamga, Symphora Behi	3:29.85		8
6	A	Ukraine	Anastasiya Rabchenyuk, Zoya Hladun-Nesterenko, Yuliya Baraley, Nataliya Pyhyda	3:30.73		7
7	A	Czech Republic	Drahomíra Eidrnová, Lenka Masná, Jitka Bartoničková, Zuzana Hejnová	3:34.87		6
8	A	Spain	Aauri Bokesa, Natalia Romero, Teresa Torres, Begoña Garrido	3:36.00		5
9	A	Portugal	Vera Barbosa, Maria Carmo Tavares, Joceline Monteiro, Patrícia Lopes	3:36.15		4
10	A	Greece	Ekaterini Sirou, Eleni Filandra, Maria Panagiotidou, Agni Derveni	3:39.34		3
11	A	Sweden	Josefin Magnusson, Moa Hjelmer, Rebecca Högberg, Ulrika Johansson	3:42.87		2
	B	Poland	Anna Kiełbasińska, Jolanta Wójcik, Agnieszka Karpiesiuk, Anna Jesień	DQ		0

=== High jump ===
June 21

Rank	Name	Nationality	1.71	1.80	1.87	1.91	1.95	1.98	2.00	2.02	2.07	Result	Notes	Points
1	Ariane Friedrich	Germany	–	–	–	o	o	–	o	o	xx–	2.02		12
2	Ruth Beitia	Spain	–	o	o	o	o	o	o	xxx		2.00	SB	11
3	Antonietta Di Martino	Italy	–	o	o	o	o	xxo	o	xx		2.00	SB	10
4	Svetlana Shkolina	Russia	–	o	o	o	xo	o	xxx			1.98	=PB	9
5	Emma Green	Sweden	–	o	o	o	xo	xxx				1.95	SB	8
6	Vita Palamar	Ukraine	–	o	o	o	xxx					1.91	SB	6.5
6	Antonia Stergiou	Greece	o	o	o	o	xxx					1.91	SB	6.5
8	Iva Straková	Czech Republic	–	o	xo	o	xxx					1.91		5
9	Kamila Stepaniuk	Poland	o	o	o	xxx						1.87		4
10	Adele Lassu	Great Britain	o	o	xxx							1.80		2.5
10	Nina Manga	France	o	o	xxx							1.80		2.5
12	Marisa Anselmo	Portugal	o	xo	xxx							1.80	SB	1

=== Pole vault ===
June 20

Rank	Name	Nationality	3.80	4.10	4.25	4.35	4.45	4.50	4.55	4.60	4.65	4.70	Result	Notes	Points
1	Monika Pyrek	Poland	–	–	–	o	–	o	–	xo	–	xo	4.70		12
2	Yuliya Golubchikova	Russia	–	–	o	–	xo	–	o	xxo	o	x	4.65	SB	11
3	Silke Spiegelburg	Germany	–	–	–	o	o	–	xxo	o	xx		4.60	SB	10
4	Kate Dennison	Great Britain	–	o	o	o	xo	–	o	xx			4.55	NR	9
5	Jiřina Ptáčníková	Czech Republic	–	o	xo	xo	xo	–	x				4.45		8
6	Nikoleta Kyriakopoulou	Greece	–	o	o	o	xxx						4.35		7
7	Télie Mathiot	France	o	o	o	xo	xxx						4.35	PB	6
8	Naroa Agirre	Spain	o	o	o	xxx							4.25		5
9	Anna Giordano Bruno	Italy	o	xo	o	xxx							4.25		4
10	Sandra-Hélèna Tavares	Portugal	xxo	o	o	xx							4.25		3
11	Nataliya Kushch	Ukraine	–	o	xxx								4.10		2
12	Malin Dahlström	Sweden	o	xxx									3.80		1

=== Long jump ===
June 21

Rank	Name	Nationality	#1	#2	#3	#4	Result	Notes	Points
1	Naide Gomes	Portugal	6.56	6.83	6.77	6.63	6.83		12
2	Olga Kucherenko	Russia	x	6.58	6.73	6.55	6.73		11
3	Teresa Dobija	Poland	6.19	6.25	6.45	6.45	6.45		10
4	Maria-Eleni Kafourou	Greece	6.20	6.39	x	6.32	6.39		9
5	Viktoriya Molchanova	Ukraine	6.34	6.25	6.37		6.37		8
6	Éloyse Lesueur	France	6.29	6.23	6.16		6.29		7
7	Bianca Kappler	Germany	6.03	6.25			6.25		6
8	Jana Korevová	Czech Republic	6.22	6.00			6.22		5
9	Tania Vicenzino	Italy	5.99	6.18			6.18		4
10	Phyllis Agbo	Great Britain	5.95	6.07			6.07		3
11	María del Mar Jover	Spain	5.95	6.05			6.05		2
12	Angelica Ström	Sweden	5.88	x			5.88		1

=== Triple jump ===
June 20

Rank	Name	Nationality	#1	#2	#3	#4	Result	Notes	Points
1	Teresa Nzola Meso Ba	France	14.40	13.62	13.78	14.06	14.40	SB	12
2	Anna Pyatykh	Russia	12.86	13.91	14.08	14.10	14.10		11
3	Magdelin Martinez	Italy	13.57	14.01	13.80	x	14.01		10
4	Małgorzata Trybańska	Poland	13.43	13.75	13.89	13.77	13.89	SB	9
5	Liliya Kulyk	Ukraine	13.58	13.77	13.85		13.85		8
6	Athanasia Perra	Greece	13.66	12.98	13.79		13.79		7
7	Patricia Sarrapio	Spain	13.24	13.56			13.56	SB	6
8	Patrícia Mamona	Portugal	13.49	13.50			13.50		5
9	Martina Šestáková	Czech Republic	13.26	13.27			13.27		4
10	Nadia Williams	Great Britain	13.07	13.21			13.21		3
11	Katja Demut	Germany	13.04	x			13.04		2
12	Angelica Ström	Sweden	12.46	12.63			12.63		1

=== Shot put ===
June 21

Rank	Name	Nationality	#1	#2	#3	#4	Result	Notes	Points
1	Nadine Kleinert	Germany	18.98	19.52	19.03	19.59	19.59		12
2	Chiara Rosa	Italy	17.92	18.41	18.46	18.57	18.57		11
3	Laurence Manfredi	France	17.59	x	17.48	18.16	18.16	SB	10
4	Magdalena Sobieszek	Poland	17.26	x	16.87	x	17.26		9
5	Helena Engman	Sweden	x	16.96	x		16.96		8
6	Irini Terzoglou	Greece	16.37	16.86	x		16.86		7
7	Jana Kárníková	Czech Republic	15.90	16.76			16.76	SB	6
8	Anna Omarova	Russia	16.47	x			16.47		5
9	Viktoriya Dehtyar	Ukraine	16.34	16.10			16.34		4
10	Irache Quintanal	Spain	15.63	15.71			15.71		3
11	Maria Antónia Borges	Portugal	15.01	15.46			15.46		2
12	Alison Rodger	Great Britain	14.61	15.43			15.43		1

=== Discus throw ===
June 20

Rank	Name	Nationality	#1	#2	#3	#4	Result	Notes	Points
1	Nataliya Semenova	Ukraine	58.25	61.58	56.86	57.98	61.58		12
2	Mélina Robert-Michon	France	58.22	60.84	x	61.41	61.41		11
3	Věra Cechlová	Czech Republic	58.58	x	60.50	x	60.50		10
4	Nadine Müller	Germany	58.80	59.53	x	57.67	59.53		9
5	Wioletta Potępa	Poland	58.44	56.78	58.81		58.81		8
6	Laura Bordignon	Italy	56.03	x	56.45		56.45		7
7	Sofia Larsson	Sweden	52.34	x			52.34		6
8	Evaggelia Sofani	Greece	50.17	51.19			51.19		5
9	Eden Francis	Great Britain	49.80	x			49.80		4
10	Irache Quintanal	Spain	47.53	45.72			47.53		3
11	Liliana Cá	Portugal	47.41	x			47.41		2
12	Olesya Korotkova	Russia	x	46.25			46.25		1

=== Hammer throw ===
June 21

Rank	Name	Nationality	#1	#2	#3	#4	Result	Notes	Points
1	Anita Włodarczyk	Poland	71.63	75.23	74.70	73.37	75.23		12
2	Betty Heidler	Germany	74.81	74.97	69.90	71.49	74.97	SB	11
3	Stiliani Papadopoulou	Greece	68.27	71.18	x	x	71.18	SB	10
4	Clarissa Claretti	Italy	68.61	69.32	69.79	70.52	70.52		9
5	Stéphanie Falzon	France	69.00	x	69.71		69.71		8
6	Zoe Derham	Great Britain	65.57	65.59	x		65.59		7
7	Berta Castells	Spain	x	65.07			65.07		6
8	Lenka Ledvinová	Czech Republic	63.85	64.94			64.94		5
9	Iryna Sekachova	Ukraine	x	64.78			64.78		4
10	Tracey Andersson	Sweden	61.70	64.75			64.75		3
11	Vânia Silva	Portugal	58.30	61.36			61.36		2
	Mariya Bespalova	Russia	x	x			NM		0

=== Javelin throw ===
June 20 Than the new ranking after IAAF decision for doping disqualification.

Rank	Name	Nationality	#1	#2	#3	#4	Result	Notes	Points
1	Christina Obergföll	Germany	x	68.59	–	x	68.59	WL	12
2	Barbora Špotáková	Czech Republic	x	65.89	x	63.92	65.89		11
~~3~~	~~Mariya Abakumova~~	~~Russia~~	~~59.80~~	~~60.62~~	~~58.86~~	~~62.01~~	~~62.01~~		~~10~~
3	Zahra Bani	Italy	56.58	50.92	59.11	x	59.11	SB	9
4	Savva Lika	Greece	56.70	58.56	x		58.56		8
5	Mercedes Chilla	Spain	58.43	x	52.50		58.43		7
6	Vira Rebryk	Ukraine	55.88	55.26			55.88		6
7	Barbara Madejczyk	Poland	53.52	53.05			53.52		5
8	Anna Wessman	Sweden	51.32	52.30			52.30		4
9	Laura Whittingham	Great Britain	49.84	51.13			51.13		3
10	Nadia Vigliano	France	47.35	50.59			50.59		2
11	Sílvia Cruz	Portugal	50.30	x			50.30		1
