= Track and field at the 2015 Military World Games – Men's 4 × 100 metres relay =

The men's 4 × 100 metres relay event at the 2015 Military World Games was held on 7 and 8 October at the KAFAC Sports Complex.

== Records ==
Prior to this competition, the existing world and CISM record were as follows:

World Record	Jamaica (Nesta Carter, Michael Frater, Yohan Blake, Usain Bolt)	36.84	London, Great Britain	11 August 2012
CISM World Record	Italy (Alessandro Cavallaro, Simone Collio, Rosario La Mastra, Jacques Riparelli)	39.28	Hyderabad, India	October 2007

== Schedule ==
Date	Time	Round
7 October 2015	17:50	Round 1
8 October 2015	16:55	Final

== Medalists ==
Gold	Silver	Bronze
Poland; Robert Kubaczyk; Grzegorz Zimniewicz; Kamil Masztak; Dariusz Kuć	Dominican Republic; Mayobanex de Óleo; Yohandris Andújar; Stanley del Carmen; Yancarlos Martinez	Sri Lanka; Vinoj Suranjaya; Mohamed Abdul Ladeef; Mohamed Abdul Rasheed; Yupun Abeykoon

== Results ==
=== Round 1 ===
Qualification: First 3 in each heat (Q) and next 2 fastest (q) qualified for the semifinals.

Rank	Heat	Nation	Name	Time	Notes
1	2	Sri Lanka	Vinoj Suranjaya, Mohamed Abdul Ladeef, Mohamed Abdul Rasheed, Yupun Abeykoon	39.67	Q
2	2	Poland	Robert Kubaczyk, Grzegorz Zimniewicz, Kamil Masztak, Dariusz Kuć	39.73	Q
3	1	Dominican Republic	Stanly del Carmen, Yancarlos Martinez, Yohandris Andújar, Mayobanex de Óleo	39.88	Q
4	2	Oman	Fahad Al-Jabri, Barakat Al-Harthi, Mohamed Hindi, Khalid Al-Ghailani	40.18	Q
5	1	Brazil	Jonathan Mendes, Aldemir da Silva Júnior, Bruno de Barros, José Carlos Moreira	40.24	Q
6	2	Kenya	Alphas Kishoyian, Mike Mokamba Nyang'au, Vincent Mumo Kiilu, Tony Kipruto Chirchir	40.27	q
7	1	South Korea	Lee Ju-ho, Kim Min-kyun, Won Jong-jin, Lim Jae-youl	40.54	Q
8	1	Italy	Fabio Cerutti, Eseosa Desalu, Matteo Galvan, Delmas Obou	40.60	q
9	1	Indonesia	Farrel Octaviandi, Muhammad Patoniah, Fernando Lumain, Rio Maholtra	41.15	
10	2	India	Manish Kumar, Vidya Sagar, Jyoti Debnath Shankar, Yesu Raj	41.25	
11	1	Turkey	Emrah Altunkalem, Hakan Karacaoğlu, Okan Kamis, Yavuz Can	41.28	
12	2	Switzerland	Steven Gugerli, Pascal Muller, Marquis Richards, Benjamin Gfohler	41.57	
	2	United States	Kyler Martin, Parnelle Shands, Oronde Vassell, Anton Graphenreed	DQ	R170.7
	1	Iran	Reza Ghasemi, Hassan Taftian, Mahdi Zamani, Sajjad Hashemiahangari	DQ	R142.4

=== Final ===
Rank	Lane	Nation	Name	Time	Notes
1st place, gold medalist(s)	6	Poland	Robert Kubaczyk, Grzegorz Zimniewicz, Kamil Masztak, Dariusz Kuć	39.35	
2nd place, silver medalist(s)	3	Dominican Republic	Mayobanex de Óleo, Yohandris Andújar, Stanly del Carmen, Yancarlos Martinez	39.41	
3rd place, bronze medalist(s)	4	Sri Lanka	Vinoj Suranjaya, Mohamed Abdul Ladeef, Mohamed Abdul Rasheed, Yupun Abeykoon	39.43	
4	2	Italy	Fabio Cerutti, Eseosa Desalu, Matteo Galvan, Delmas Obou	39.64	
5	5	Brazil	Jonathan Mendes, Aldemir da Silva Júnior, Bruno de Barros, José Carlos Moreira	39.77	
6	8	Oman	Mohamed Hindi, Barakat Al-Harthi, Abdullah Al-Sooli, Khalid Al-Ghailani	39.81	
7	7	South Korea	Lee Ju-ho, Kim Min-kyun, Won Jong-jin, Jang Chong-myung	40.49	
8	1	Kenya	Tony Kipruto Chirchir, Mike Mokamba Nyang'au, Vincent Mumo Kiilu, Alphas Kishoyian	40.58	
