= Athletics at the 2009 Summer Universiade – Men's 200 metres =

The men's 200 metres event at the 2009 Summer Universiade was held on 9–10 July.

== Medalists ==
Gold	Silver	Bronze
Ramil Guliyev; Azerbaijan	Amr Ibrahim Mostafa Seoud; Egypt	Thuso Mpuang; South Africa

== Results ==
=== Heats ===
Qualification: First 3 of each heat (Q) and the next 2 fastest (q) qualified for the quarterfinals.

Wind:
Heat 1: +1.0 m/s, Heat 2: +1.3 m/s, Heat 3: -0.7 m/s, Heat 4: -0.6 m/s, Heat 5: +0.2 m/s
Heat 6: +2.1 m/s, Heat 7: -0.5 m/s, Heat 8: -0.5 m/s, Heat 9: +0.9 m/s, Heat 10: -0.7 m/s

Rank	Heat	Name	Nationality	Time	Notes
1	6	Amr Ibrahim Mostafa Seoud	Egypt	20.79	Q
2	5	Gavin Smellie	Canada	20.92	Q
3	1	Sam Effah	Canada	20.96	Q
4	1	Mitsuhiro Abiko	Japan	21.16	Q
5	1	Zheng Xiao	China	21.19	Q, PB
6	7	Thuso Mpuang	South Africa	21.25	Q
7	2	Rolando Palacios	Honduras	21.26	Q
7	5	Robert Kubaczyk	Poland	21.26	Q, SB
7	9	Christopher Kofi Gyapong	Ghana	21.26	Q
10	5	Jiří Vojtík	Czech Republic	21.29	Q
11	2	Egidijus Dilys	Lithuania	21.30	Q
12	1	Jeong Duk-hyung	South Korea	21.32	q
12	4	Yordan Ilinov	Bulgaria	21.32	Q
14	9	Jeffery Thumath	New Zealand	21.33	Q
15	7	Tshepang Tshube	Botswana	21.38	Q
16	9	Franklin Nazareno	Ecuador	21.41	Q
17	3	Sean Wroe	Australia	21.43	Q
18	3	Žilvinas Adomavičius	Lithuania	21.44	Q
19	7	Nicklas Kirk Hyde	Denmark	21.45	Q
20	10	Hitoshi Saito	Japan	21.46	Q
21	4	Gregor Kokalovič	Slovenia	21.47	Q
22	9	Fredrik Johansson	Sweden	21.48	q, SB
23	7	Tang Yik Chun	Hong Kong	21.51	
24	6	Leung Ki Ho	Hong Kong	21.53	Q
25	6	Henri Sool	Estonia	21.53	Q
26	1	Ali Ekber Kayaş	Turkey	21.57	
26	8	Ivan Teplykh	Russia	21.57	Q
28	7	Liang Tse-Ching	Chinese Taipei	21.61	
29	4	Alli Ngaimoko	Uganda	21.62	Q
30	10	Ramis Abdulkaderov	Russia	21.63	Q
31	5	Catalin Câmpeanu	Romania	21.66	
31	8	Kamil Masztak	Poland	21.66	Q
33	8	Ramil Guliyev	Azerbaijan	21.68	Q
34	10	Leigh Julius	South Africa	21.70	Q
35	1	Gábor Pásztor	Hungary	21.74	
36	5	Dany Gonçalves	Portugal	21.79	
37	4	Daniel Christensen	Denmark	21.80	
38	6	Krasimir Braikov	Bulgaria	21.83	
39	1	Aymar Oboba Fleury	Republic of the Congo	21.84	
40	2	Takeshi Fujiwara	El Salvador	21.89	Q
41	10	Marvin Kamuingona	Namibia	21.94	SB
42	3	Jan Schiller	Czech Republic	21.95	Q
42	8	Andrew Moore	New Zealand	21.95	
44	10	Gary Robinson	Costa Rica	22.00	SB
45	2	Matevz Arh	Slovenia	22.06	PB
46	4	Eric Goloe	Ghana	22.12	
46	9	Paulus Mathijssen	Netherlands Antilles	22.12	
48	3	Lazarous Inya	Uganda	22.26	
49	6	Kabelo Tsiang	Botswana	22.33	
50	2	Saša Kecman	Bosnia and Herzegovina	22.35	
51	4	Miloš Simović	Serbia	22.44	
52	3	Kermeliss Olonghot Ghyd	Republic of the Congo	22.54	
53	8	Ali Hazer	Lebanon	22.63	
54	7	Michael Guerrero	Costa Rica	22.69	SB
55	3	Hammam Al-Farsi	Oman	22.83	
56	7	Omar Al-Momani	Jordan	23.02	
57	9	Alexandros Hardovvalis	Greece	23.09	
58	5	Ali Raza Toor	Pakistan	23.23	
59	2	Yeo Ho Sua	South Korea	23.47	
60	4	Ismail Al-Kindi	Oman	23.58	
61	8	Tran Van Luong	Vietnam	23.65	
62	5	Mubarak Al-Malik	Qatar	23.84	PB
63	6	Abdulah Ibrahimm Al-Habib	Saudi Arabia	26.10	
64	8	Khalid Sulimana Al-Saeed	Saudi Arabia	27.99	
	2	Miloš Savić	Serbia	DQ	
	9	Michel Al-Zinati	Lebanon	DQ	
	2	Gérard Kobéané	Burkina Faso	DNS	
	3	Nedim Čović	Bosnia and Herzegovina	DNS	
	3	Bob Niamali	Democratic Republic of the Congo	DNS	
	4	Cyrus Wesley	Liberia	DNS	
	5	Dmitrii Iliin	Kyrgyzstan	DNS	
	6	Hafiz Greigre	Liberia	DNS	
	6	Roussel Muteka	Democratic Republic of the Congo	DNS	
	7	Kael Becerra	Chile	DNS	
	8	Gregory Bailey	Liberia	DNS	
	9	Eneme Sergio Mba Nso	Equatorial Guinea	DNS	
	10	Obinna Ekechi	Nigeria	DNS	
	10	João Ferreira	Portugal	DNS	

=== Quarterfinals ===
Qualification: First 3 of each heat (Q) and the next 4 fastest (q) qualified for the semifinals.

Wind:
Heat 1: +0.5 m/s, Heat 2: +1.6 m/s, Heat 3: -0.7 m/s, Heat 4: +0.8 m/s

Rank	Heat	Name	Nationality	Time	Notes
1	4	Amr Ibrahim Mostafa Seoud	Egypt	20.73	Q
2	1	Gavin Smellie	Canada	20.75	Q
3	2	Ramil Guliyev	Azerbaijan	20.87	Q
4	2	Sam Effah	Canada	20.97	Q
5	1	Jeong Duk-hyung	South Korea	20.98	Q, SB
5	3	Thuso Mpuang	South Africa	20.98	Q
7	1	Yordan Ilinov	Bulgaria	21.02	Q
8	2	Rolando Palacios	Honduras	21.04	Q
9	4	Hitoshi Saito	Japan	21.06	Q
10	4	Kamil Masztak	Poland	21.09	Q
11	3	Robert Kubaczyk	Poland	21.10	Q, SB
12	2	Jiří Vojtík	Czech Republic	21.12	q
13	1	Ivan Teplykh	Russia	21.15	q
14	4	Sean Wroe	Australia	21.20	q
15	2	Mitsuhiro Abiko	Japan	21.27	q
16	4	Žilvinas Adomavičius	Lithuania	21.28	
17	3	Gregor Kokalovič	Slovenia	21.29	Q
18	2	Leigh Julius	South Africa	21.31	
19	1	Franklin Nazareno	Ecuador	21.35	
20	2	Jeffery Thumath	New Zealand	21.36	
20	3	Christopher Kofi Gyapong	Ghana	21.36	
22	4	Nicklas Kirk Hyde	Denmark	21.39	
23	3	Egidijus Dilys	Lithuania	21.45	
24	1	Alli Ngaimoko	Uganda	21.47	SB
25	1	Tshepang Tshube	Botswana	21.50	
25	2	Ramis Abdulkaderov	Russia	21.50	
27	4	Fredrik Johansson	Sweden	21.68	
28	4	Henri Sool	Estonia	21.71	
29	1	Leung Ki Ho	Hong Kong	21.78	
29	3	Zheng Xiao	China	21.78	
	3	Takeshi Fujiwara	El Salvador	DNS	
	3	Jan Schiller	Czech Republic	DNS	

=== Semifinals ===
Qualification: First 4 of each semifinal qualified directly (Q) for the final.

Wind:
Heat 1: +0.9 m/s, Heat 2: -0.2 m/s

Rank	Heat	Name	Nationality	Time	Notes
1	2	Amr Ibrahim Mostafa Seoud	Egypt	20.64	Q
2	1	Gavin Smellie	Canada	20.67	Q
3	2	Sam Effah	Canada	20.75	Q
4	1	Ramil Guliyev	Azerbaijan	20.79	Q
5	1	Rolando Palacios	Honduras	20.83	Q
6	1	Hitoshi Saito	Japan	20.87	Q
7	2	Thuso Mpuang	South Africa	20.89	Q
8	1	Jeong Duk-hyung	South Korea	20.93	PB
9	2	Robert Kubaczyk	Poland	21.02	Q, PB
10	2	Mitsuhiro Abiko	Japan	21.06	
11	2	Yordan Ilinov	Bulgaria	21.10	
12	1	Kamil Masztak	Poland	21.12	
13	1	Ivan Teplykh	Russia	21.19	
14	2	Jiří Vojtík	Czech Republic	21.28	
15	2	Gregor Kokalovič	Slovenia	21.36	
16	1	Sean Wroe	Australia	21.37	

=== Final ===
Wind: +0.1 m/s

Rank	Lane	Name	Nationality	Time	Notes
1st place, gold medalist(s)	4	Ramil Guliyev	Azerbaijan	20.04	NR, AJR
2nd place, silver medalist(s)	5	Amr Ibrahim Mostafa Seoud	Egypt	20.52	
3rd place, bronze medalist(s)	8	Thuso Mpuang	South Africa	20.69	
4	7	Rolando Palacios	Honduras	20.78	
5	6	Sam Effah	Canada	20.83	
6	3	Gavin Smellie	Canada	20.84	
7	1	Hitoshi Saito	Japan	22.22	
	2	Robert Kubaczyk	Poland	DNF	
