= Italy at the European Athletics Team Championships =

Italy team at athletics event

- WA code: ITA
- National federation: FIDAL
- Website: www.fidal.it
- Medals Ranked 8th: Gold 21 Silver 25 Bronze 37 Total 83

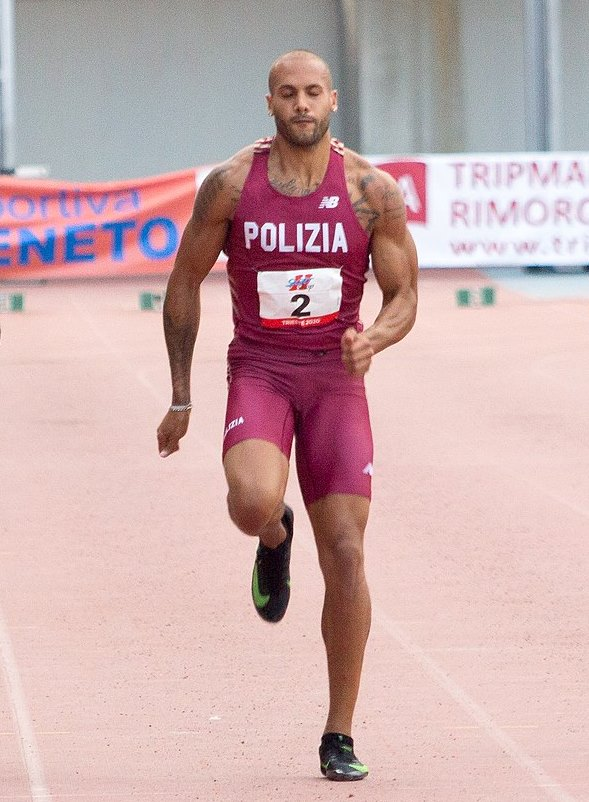
Marcell Jacobs.

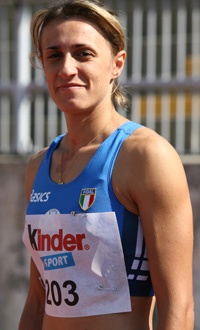
Antonietta Di Martino.

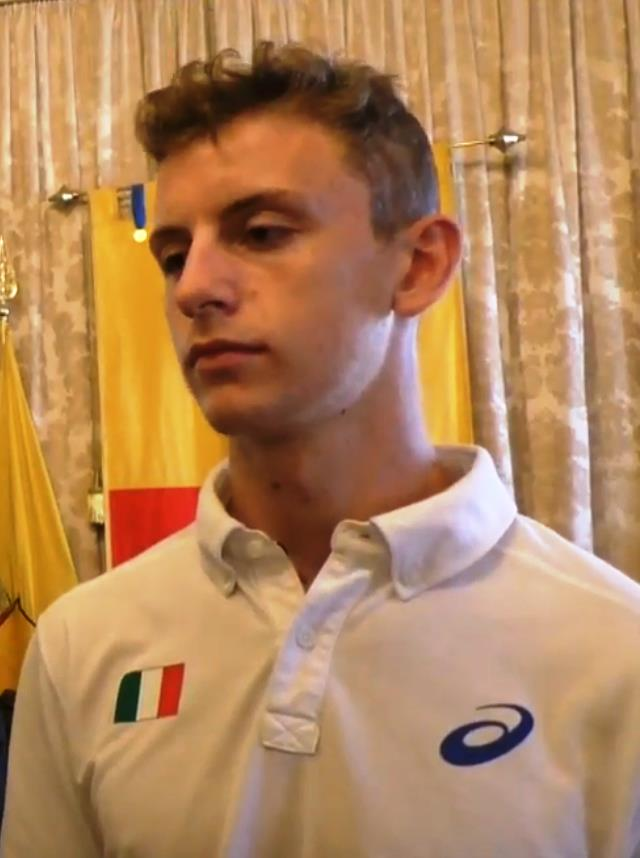
Alessandro Sibilio to wins at Silesia 2021.

Italy at the European Athletics Team Championships participated at all editions of the European Athletics Team Championships from Leiria 2009.

== Final standings ==
Italy national athletics team participated in the Super League in all editions.

Country	2009	2010	2011	2013	2014	2015	2017	2019	2021	2023	2025
Italy	5	7	8	7	7	6	7	4	2	1	1

== Results ==
Updated to 2021 European Athletics Team Championships

=== Overall ===
Edition	1st place, gold medalist(s)	2nd place, silver medalist(s)	3rd place, bronze medalist(s)	4	5	6	7	8
(Portugal) Leiria 2009	4	3	5	2	4	5	3	4
(Norway) Bergen 2010	2	3	4	5	4	8	3	4
(Sweden) Stockholm 2011	1	1	3	4	7	3	4	5
(United Kingdom) Gateshead 2013	-	2	2	6	6	9	5	2
(Germany) Braunschweig 2014	-	2	3	7	3	4	5	4
(Russia) Cheboksary 2015	2	1	7	9	4	2	1	4
(France) Lille 2017	-	4	3	4	3	5	9	2
(Poland) Bydgoszcz 2019	4	3	5	5	5	7	3	4
(Poland) Silesia 2021	8	6	5	9	5	5	1	-
	21	25	37	51	41	48	34	29

=== Men ===
Edition	1st place, gold medalist(s)	2nd place, silver medalist(s)	3rd place, bronze medalist(s)	4	5	6	7	8
(Portugal) Leiria 2009	2	-	2	-	2	3	1	3
(Norway) Bergen 2010	1	2	2	2	2	3	2	2
(Sweden) Stockholm 2011	1	-	1	2	4	2	2	2
(United Kingdom) Gateshead 2013	-	1	-	1	5	4	4	-
(Germany) Braunschweig 2014	-	1	2	3	2	3	2	2
(Russia) Cheboksary 2015	2	1	4	4	3	-	-	2
(France) Lille 2017	-	2	1	2	2	2	7	1
(Poland) Bydgoszcz 2019	3	2	1	3	2	5	1	2
(Poland) Silesia 2021	5	2	2	7	2	1	0	-
	14	11	15	24	24	23	19	14

=== Women ===
Edition	1st place, gold medalist(s)	2nd place, silver medalist(s)	3rd place, bronze medalist(s)	4	5	6	7	8
(Portugal) Leiria 2009	2	3	3	2	2	2	2	1
(Norway) Bergen 2010	1	1	2	3	2	5	1	2
(Sweden) Stockholm 2011	-	1	2	2	3	1	2	3
(United Kingdom) Gateshead 2013	-	1	2	5	1	5	1	2
(Germany) Braunschweig 2014	-	1	1	4	1	1	3	2
(Russia) Cheboksary 2015	-	-	3	5	1	2	1	2
(France) Lille 2017	-	2	2	2	1	3	2	1
(Poland) Bydgoszcz 2019	1	1	4	2	3	2	2	2
(Poland) Silesia 2021	3	4	3	2	3	4	1	-
	7	14	22	27	17	25	15	15

== Top three finishes ==
Updated to 2019 European Athletics Team Championships

=== Men ===
Athlete	Events
Giordano Benedetti	800m: 15 ETC 1 / 14 ETC 3 / 17 ETC 2
Leonardo Capotosti	400mH: 15 ETC 3
Fabio Cerutti	4 × 100 m: 09 ETC 1
Maurizio Checcucci	4 × 100 m: 10 ETC 1
Simone Collio	4 × 100 m: 10 ETC 1 / 09 ETC 1
Yemaneberhan Crippa	5000m: 19 ETC 1
Enrico Demonte	200m: 15 ETC 3 / 4 × 100 m: 15 ETC 3
Fausto Desalu	200m: 19 ETC 2 / 4 × 100 m: 14 ETC 3
Emanuele Di Gregorio	100m: 10 ETC 3 / 4 × 100 m: 10 ETC 1 / 09 ETC 1
Roberto Donati	4 × 100 m: 10 ETC 1
Fabrizio Donato	TJ: 14 ETC 2 / 15 ETC 1
Marco Fassinotti	HJ: 15 ETC 2 / 17 ETC 2
Massimiliano Ferraro	4 × 100 m: 15 ETC 3 / 14 ETC 3
Yuri Floriani	3000mSC: 15 ETC 3
Matteo Galvan	4 × 400 m: 19 ETC 1
Giuseppe Gibilisco	PV: 10 ETC 3 / 13 ETC 2
Marcell Jacobs	100m: 19 ETC 2
Brayan Lopez	4 × 400 m: 19 ETC 1
Davide Manenti	4 × 100 m: 15 ETC 3
Diego Marani	4 × 100 m: 14 ETC 3
Daniele Meucci	3000m: 09 ETC 3
Delmas Obou	4 × 100 m: 15 ETC 3 / 14 ETC 3
Christian Obrist	1500m: 10 ETC 2
Davide Re	400m: 17 ETC 3 / 19 ETC 1 / 4 × 400 m: 19 ETC 1
Fabrizio Schembri	TJ: 11 ETC 1 / 09 ETC 3
Edoardo Scotti	4 × 400 m: 19 ETC 1
Stefano Sottile	HJ: 19 ETC 3
Giovanni Tomasicchio	4 × 100 m: 09 ETC 1
Marco Francesco Vistalli	400m: 11 ETC 3
Nicola Vizzoni	HT: 10 ETC 2 / 09 ETC 1

=== Women ===
Athlete	Events
Audrey Alloh	4 × 100 m: 17 ETC 3
Zahra Bani	JT: 09 ETC 3
Luminosa Bogliolo	100mH: 19 ETC 1
Anna Bongiorni	4 × 100 m: 17 ETC 3
Rebecca Borga	4 × 400 m: 19 ETC 3
Marzia Caravelli	100mH: 11 ETC 3
Ottavia Cestonaro	TJ: 19 ETC 3
Maria Benedicta Chigbolu	400m: 19 ETC 3 / 4 × 400 m: 19 ETC 3
Elisa Cusma	800m: 10 ETC 2 / 1500m: 09 ETC 2
Antonietta Di Martino	HJ: 10 ETC 1 / 09 ETC 3
Ayomide Folorunso	4 × 400 m: 19 ETC 3
Libania Grenot	400m: 15 ETC 3 / 09 ETC 1 / 10 ETC 3 / 4 × 400 m: 09 ETC 1
Gloria Hooper	4 × 100 m: 17 ETC 3
Simona La Mantia	TJ: 13 ETC 3 / 15 ETC 3 / 11 ETC 2
Margherita Magnani	1500m: 13 ETC 3
Magdelín Martínez	TJ: 09 ETC 3
Marta Milani	4 × 400 m: 09 ETC 1
Yadisleidis Pedroso	400mH: 15 ETC 3 / 17 ETC 2
Daniela Reina	4 × 400 m: 09 ETC 1
Chiara Rosa	SP: 09 ETC 2 / 10 ETC 3 / 11 ETC 3 / 14 ETC 3
Yuneysi Santiusti	800m: 17 ETC 2
Irene Siragusa	4 × 100 m: 17 ETC 3
Maria Enrica Spacca	4 × 400 m: 09 ETC 1
Giancarla Trevisan	4 × 400 m: 19 ETC 3
Alessia Trost	HJ: 19 ETC 3 / 17 ETC 3 / 13 ETC 2
Giulia Viola	5000m: 14 ETC 2
Silvia Weissteiner	5000m: 09 ETC 2
Marta Zenoni	3000m: 19 ETC 2

== Silesia 2021 ==
Italy competes in the 2021 European Athletics Team Championships in 39 out of 40 races and so signs 0 points in the high jump due to the absence of the last moment of Gianmarco Tamberi, high jumper who had the best measure among those entered in the race, therefore the damage made to the classification is quantifiable in 7 points. The Italian team won eight events in this edition.

=== Men ===
Event	Athlete	Rank
200 m	Fausto Desalu	1st place, gold medalist(s)
5000 m	Yemaneberhan Crippa	1st place, gold medalist(s)
400 m hs	Alessandro Sibilio	1st place, gold medalist(s)
Long jump	Filippo Randazzo	1st place, gold medalist(s)
4×400 m relay	Davide Re, Alessandro Sibilio, Edoardo Scotti, Vladimir Aceti	1st place, gold medalist(s)
100 m	Lorenzo Patta	2nd place, silver medalist(s)
Shot put	Leonardo Fabbri	2nd place, silver medalist(s)
400 m	Davide Re	3rd place, bronze medalist(s)
3000 m steeple	Osama Zoghlami	3rd place, bronze medalist(s)
800 m	Simone Barontini	4
3000 m	Yassin Bouih	4
110 m hs	Lorenzo Perini	4
Pole vault	Matteo Capello	4
Triple jump	Tobia Bocchi	4
Discus throw	Giovanni Faloci	4
Javelin throw	Roberto Orlando	4
Hammer throw	Simone Falloni	5
4x100 m relay	Federico Cattaneo, Fausto Desalu, Davide Manenti, Lorenzo Patta	5
1500 m	Matteo Guelfo	6

=== Women ===
Event	Athlete	Rank
1500 m	Gaia Sabbatini	1st place, gold medalist(s)
5000 m	Nadia Battocletti	1st place, gold medalist(s)
Pole vault	Roberta Bruni	1st place, gold medalist(s)
200 m	Dalia Kaddari	2nd place, silver medalist(s)
800 m	Elena Bellò	2nd place, silver medalist(s)
100 m hs	Luminosa Bogliolo	2nd place, silver medalist(s)
High jump	Alessia Trost	2nd place, silver medalist(s)
400 m hs	Linda Olivieri	3rd place, bronze medalist(s)
Hammer throw	Sara Fantini	3rd place, bronze medalist(s)
4x400 m relay	Alice Mangione, Eleonora Marchiando, Petra Nardelli, Raphaela Lukudo	3rd place, bronze medalist(s)
3000 m steeple	Martina Merlo	4
Long jump	Laura Strati	4
4x100 m relay	Irene Siragusa, Gloria Hooper, Anna Bongiorni, Vittoria Fontana	5
3000 m	Micol Majori	5
Javelin throw	Zahra Bani	5
100 m	Gloria Hooper	6
400 m	Alice Mangione	6
Shot put	Chiara Rosa	6
Discus throw	Stefania Strumillo	6
Triple jump	Dariya Derkach	7

== See also ==
- Italy national athletics team
- Italy at the European Cup
