= Darko Šarović =

Serbian medical doctor and athlete (born 1990)

- Serbian 200 m Champion in 2011

Personal information
- Nationality: Serbia & Sweden
- Born: May 16, 1990 (age 36) Belgrade, Serbia
- Height: 168 cm (66 in)
- Weight: 71 kg (157 lb)

Sport
- Sport: Track & Field
- Event(s): 60m and 100m
- Club: Red Star Belgrade & IK Ymer

Achievements and titles
- Personal best(s): 60m: 6.89 (Gothenburg 2012) 6.89 (Istanbul 2012); 100m: 10.46 (Sliven 2011); 200m: 21.52 (Novi Sad 2012); 400m: 51.17 (Novi Sad 2011); Pole Vault: 4.13i (Borås 2011); Long Jump: 6.73i (Borås 2008); High Jump: 1.85 (Bar 2011); Javelin: 48.23 (Borås 2011); 60mH: 8.56 (Gothenburg 2009) 110mH: 15.97 (Eskilstuna 2009)
Medal record
Representing Serbia
Balkan Championships
Gold medal – first place	2012 Eskisehir	100 m
Bronze medal – third place	2012 Eskisehir	4x100 m
Balkan Indoor Championships
Bronze medal – third place	2012 Istanbul	60 m
Representing Red Star Belgrade
Serbian Championships
Gold medal – first place	2010 Sremska Mitrovica	Pole Vault
Gold medal – first place	2011 Kragujevac	200 m
Gold medal – first place	2012 Novi Sad	100 m
Gold medal – first place	2012 Novi Sad	200 m
Silver medal – second place	2011 Kragujevac	100 m
Bronze medal – third place	2011 Novi Sad	Decathlon
Bronze medal – third place	2012 Novi Sad	4x100 m
Serbian Indoor Championships
Silver medal – second place	2014 Novi Sad	60 m
Serbian Championships U23
Gold medal – first place	2012 Novi Sad	100 m
Gold medal – first place	2011 Novi Sad	400 m
Gold medal – first place	2011 Novi Sad	4x100 m
Silver medal – second place	2011 Novi Sad	100 m
Silver medal – second place	2012 Novi Sad	4x100 m
Representing IK Ymer
Swedish Championships U20
Silver medal – second place	2009 Sollentuna	Decathlon
Swedish High School Championships
Bronze medal – third place	2008 Sollentuna	High Jump

Darko Šarović (Serbian: Дарко Шаровић, born 16 May 1990) is a Serbian medical doctor, PhD in child psychiatry, Master of Science in psychology, and former professional athlete who specialised in the short sprint events, holding a national 100m record in the under 23 category. He is a postdoctoral research fellow at Harvard Medical School and Massachusetts General Hospital. He holds both Serbian and Swedish citizenships.

He currently represents the Swedish National Dodgeball Team in the men's and mixed categories, having been voted MVP at the European Championships and won a silver medal at the Central European Dodgeball Championships in 2019. He is the medical director for the World Dodgeball Federation.

== Personal life ==
Šarović was born in Belgrade on May 16, 1990, as an only child to parents Zorica Zarkovic and Dusan Sarovic. In 1992, he moved to Borås, Sweden. In 2009, he moved to Belgrade to study medicine at the University of Belgrade, and graduated in 2015. In 2016 he moved to Gothenburg and embarked on a PhD program in child and adolescent psychiatry. He is of Serbian, Croatian and Montenegrin descent.

Šarović's parents were both athletes competing in the highest national leagues in basketball and volleyball. His maternal grandfather was the captain of the Yugoslavia men's national volleyball team, playing the position of setter. He also has cousins in the Serbian National gymnastics and taekwondo Teams. He was previously a member of Mensa.

== Education ==
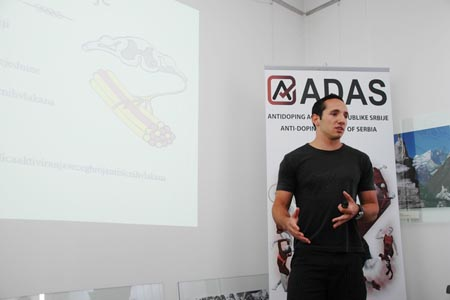
Šarović giving a lecture for the Anti-Doping Agency of Serbia

Šarović finished the International Baccalaureate Diploma Programme at Sven-Eriksonsgymnasiet to receive a bilingual diploma. After high school, in 2009, he enrolled in the 6 year long Medicine and Surgery program at the Medical Faculty at Belgrade University. In 2010, he got elected as the best student having the highest grade point average at the English Medical Faculty. During his second and third years he was a student researcher at the Institute of anatomy where he investigated the effects of maternal deprivation on brain development in rats. He graduated in 2015 after defending his graduation thesis in child plastic and neurosurgery on the topic of craniosynostosis.

He has done a clinical internship with integrated research (forskar-AT) at the Sahlgrenska University Hospital in Gothenburg, and is currently a resident (ST-läkare) in radiology at the same hospital. He was the medical director and chief physician at the 2019 European Athletics U20 Championships, a physician at the 2022 World Athletics Indoor Championships, and is the current director of medicine and anti-doping for the World Dodgeball Federation.

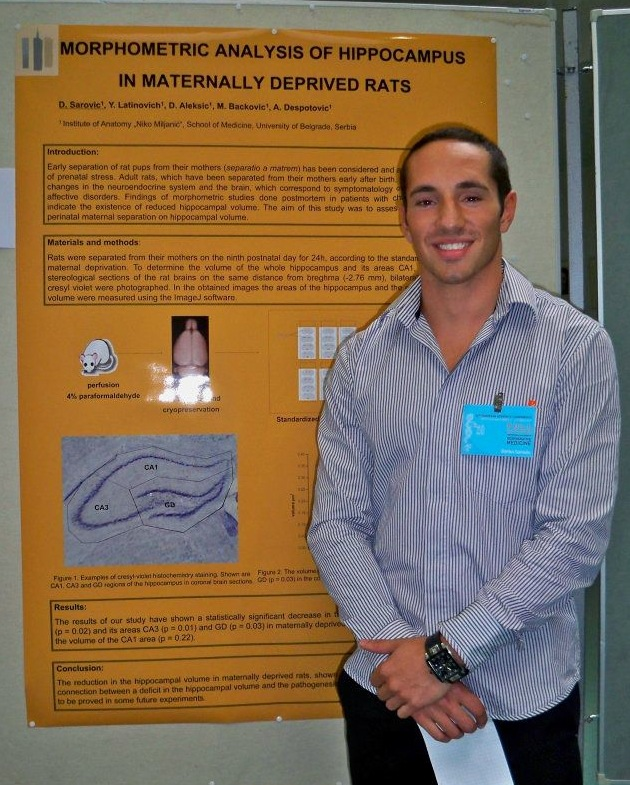
Šarović presenting his research at the European Students' Congress in Berlin, September 2011

Besides studying medicine, he also holds Bachelors and Master's degrees in psychology and a PhD in child and adolescent psychiatry from the University of Gothenburg where his main area of research was studying autism using magnetoencephalography and magnetic resonance imaging. He has published a theoretical framework for the development of autism called the Pathogenetic Triad. He is currently a postdoctoral researcher in radiology at Harvard Medical School and Massachusetts General Hospital where he studies social communication using hyperscanning with magneto- and electroencephalography. He is also an affiliated researcher at Uppsala University where he studies ADHD in females.

Sarovic supervises Bachelors and Masters theses in medicine (at the Sahlgrenska Academy) and engineering (at Chalmers University of Technology), and also clinically supervises and teaches medical students. He has been a guest lecturer at the University of Belgrade, Faculty of Sport and Physical Education, the Anti-Doping Agency of Serbia, and the Bioethical Society of Serbia on topics such as exercise physiology, psychology, medical ethics, sports ethics, and doping.

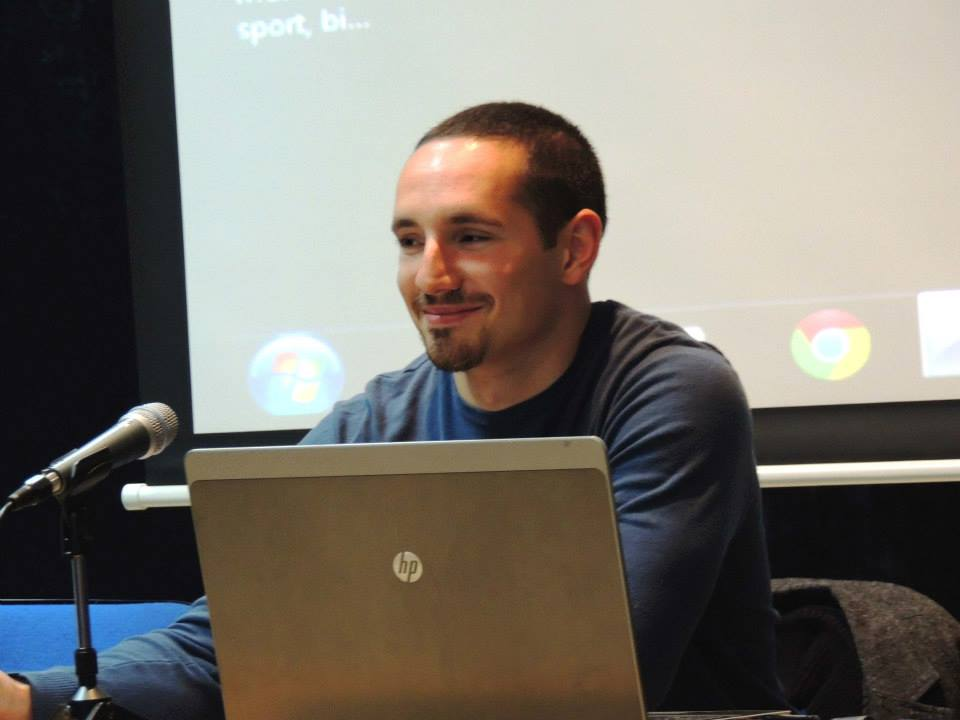
Šarović giving a lecture for the Bioethical Society of Serbia

== Early athletic career ==
After starting to practice swimming and gymnastics at age 4, he tried most sports and had multiple practices a day up to his late teens, when he decided to focus solely on track and field.

Sport	Time
Soccer	2001–2002 + 2004–2009
Handball	2002–2009
Volleyball	2003–2006 + 2008–2009
Football	2006–2008
Tennis	2007–2009
Athletics	2008–present

=== Soccer ===
Played on the Regional U13 Team. He also participated in the try-outs for the Regional U16 Team. Became regional champion (Västra Götaland) with Byttorps IF's Reserve Team in the Premier Division for reserve teams. Coached the club's U13 team for the seasons 2007–2008. Was a referee for the Junior League 2006–2007.

=== Handball ===
Played in Byttorps IF in Borås. Made his debut in the senior team at an age of 14, scoring the most goals in a game that season (14). Was on the try-outs for the regional team and got a place on the team, but later lost his place. Competed at the Swedish National Championships in 2006 and was the 5th best scorer (9.8 goals per game). He also got elected as the MVP of the game in 5 of the 6 matches they played.

=== Volleyball ===
At an age of 13 he started playing the position of setter for the first team in the club IK Ymer, which was at the time in the 3rd division in the Swedish league. In 2006 he finished a referee course to become a referee for the 1st division for women and 3rd division for men.

=== Football ===
Played in the club Borås Rhinos and got elected MVP offence in 2007. While playing in the club he scored 21 touchdowns and 86% of the team's points.

== Track and field ==
Sarovic started practicing track and field in 2008 in the Swedish club IK Ymer. He practiced track for 3 months as early as in 2001 and placed 3rd in the Regional Championships in the high jump event with a record of 1.25m, but soon lost interest due to the lack of coaches in the club.

He is the fifth fastest serb of all time, and the Serbian U23 record holder in the 100 m. Sarovic is a Balkan 100 m Champion, and 60 m and 4 × 100 m bronze medallist. He is also the Serbian Champion in the 100 m, 200 m (twice) and the pole vault events and Serbian U23 Champion in the 100 m, 400 m and 4 × 100 m. Sarovic represented the Serbian National Athletics Team in the 60 m, 100 m, 200 m, and 4 × 100 m.

=== 2008 ===
In his first 60 m competition he clocked a time of 7.47 to tie for the 4th place at the Regional Indoor Championships. He ended the indoor 2008 season with a personal best of 7.34, recording personal bests in all 10 races.

In his first 100 m race he ran 11.60 at a division 1 meet with IK Ymer placing 2nd. The remainder of the season he traveled around Sweden to competitions trying to qualify for the Swedish U20 Championships (11.50 s). He ended the season with a personal best of 11.53 in allowed winds; 11.26, 11.28, 11.41 and 11.46 with +2.4 or more wind. Since he was close to the qualifying norm, the club decided to allow him to compete at the National Junior Championships in the 100 m and 200 m events where he placed 21st and 19th respectively.

At the end of the season he placed 3rd in the high jump event at the Swedish High School Championships; Also 7th in the 100 m and 300 mH, and 8th in the long jump event.

=== 2009 ===
In the beginning of the season he lowered his personal best to 7.04 at the Regional Championships. He won the gold medal in the 60m, long jump and 60mH events for U20. He also won another gold and a silver in the long jump and 60m events respectively for the senior class.

On March 14–15 he competed at the Swedish National Indoor Multi Event Championships in Eskilstuna and did his first heptathlon. He finished 5th after having scored 4 personal bests.

On March 23, 2009, he badly injured his left ankle when practicing pole vaulting due to a bad fall. After this he was out of practice for more than 4 months, and back in competition in late July. There was little time to get back in shape but he still finished the season with a small personal best of 11.40.

At the end of the season the injury was almost completely healed and he decided to compete in the Swedish National U20 Championships in the decathlon, his first time. He placed second after having scored 5 personal bests. That result still stands as the club record U20 in IK Ymer.

=== 2010 ===
In September 2009, Sarovic moved to Belgrade, Serbia to study medicine. He then started practicing in Red Star Belgrade with coach Ljubisa Stevanovic (Serbian: Љубиша Стевановић). This proved to be a successful cooperation.

The winter season of 2010, still recovering from the injury and not having had a regular practice since March, he averaged 7.21 in the 60m dash.

After getting back on track with practices he opened the outdoor season with a personal best in the 100 m of 11.19. He lowered his personal best 9 more times that season and finally broke the 11 s-barrier at the Serbian National Championships; 10.89 in the qualifying round and 10.90 in the finals to finish 5th on the first day. On the second day he competed in the 200 m and pole vault. He qualified for the final in the 200m event but did not run in it since it was at the same time as the pole vault; the discipline which he went on to win a gold medal in; his first at a national championship.

In 2010 he won a triple gold at the Belgrade Championships: 100 m, 400 m and 4 × 100 m.

Towards the end of the season he lowered his personal best down to 10.83, running out of competition at the Serbian National U18 Championships in Kragujevac, Serbia.

He finished off the season with his second decathlon and became the champion of Vojvodina with 6 new personal bests.

In November he pulled his left hamstring; an injury that persisted across the winter season to April 2011.

=== 2011 ===
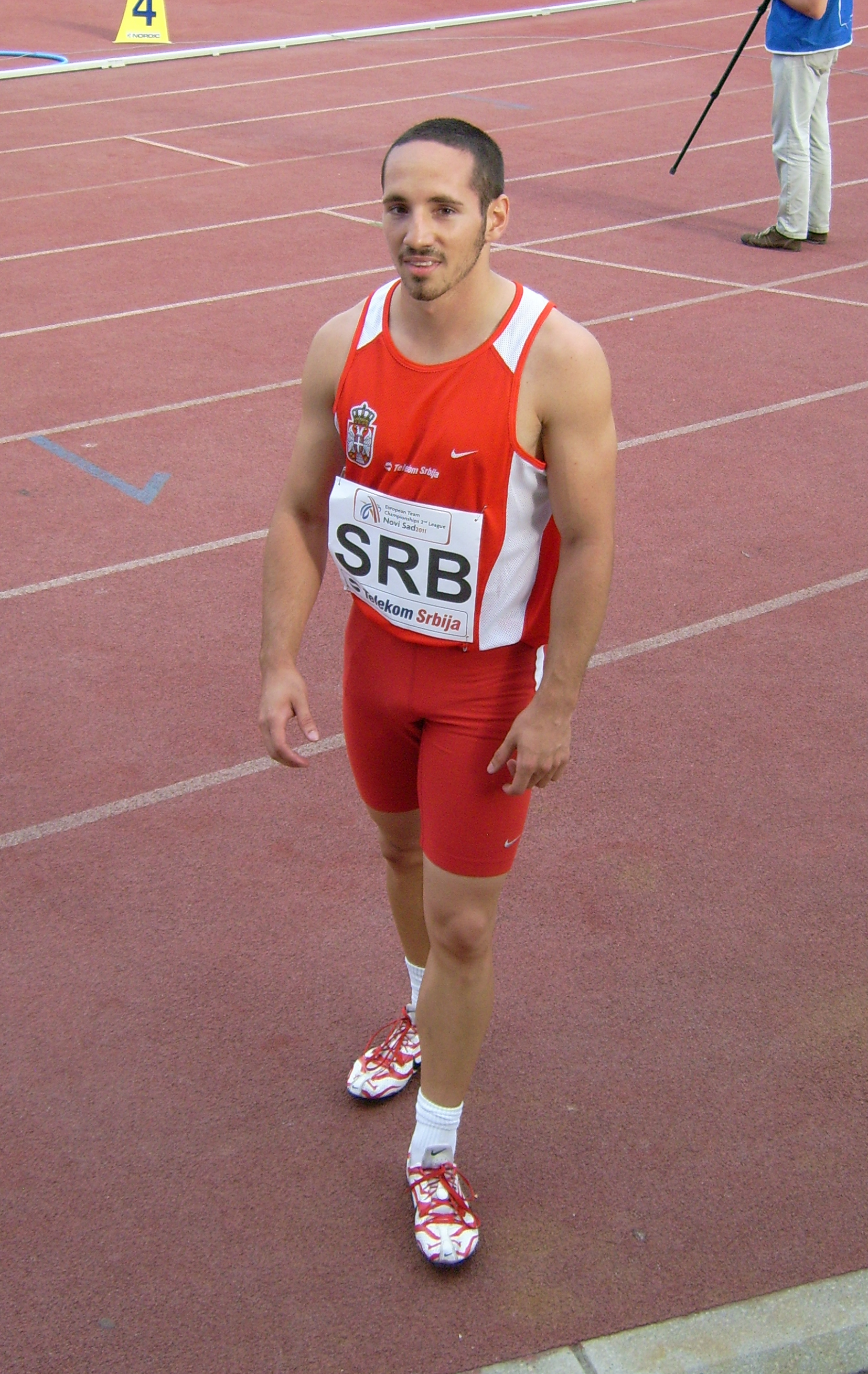
Sarovic's first appearance for the Serbian National Team at the European Team Championships 2nd League in Novi Sad 2011

During the winter break at his University, Sarovic went back to Sweden to compete. On February 5 he broke the 7 s-barrier with a personal best of 6.96 to finish first in the qualifying rounds of the Gothenburg Regional Championships. In the final he won with a time of 6.86, but that race got restarted due to unknown circumstances. In the re-race he placed 3rd with 7.02.

He also competed in the preparative competition (Road To Göteborg 2013) for the European Indoor Championships that will be held in Gothenburg 2013. There he ran under 7 s for the third time to finish 6th with 6.96 (7.002 in the qualifying rounds).

In the summer of 2011 Sarovic competed in his first major competitions:

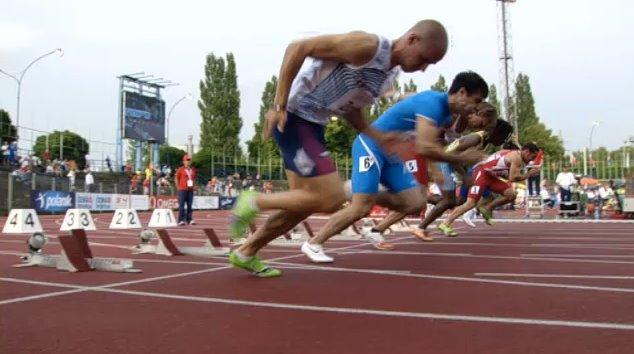
Sarovic in the lead in the 100 m semifinals at the European U23 Championships in Ostrava 2011

First at the Belgrade International Athletics Meet (10.93), then at the European Champion Clubs Cup at his own Red Star stadium (22.18 PB & 10.84). He made his debut in the national team in Novi Sad at the European Team Championships, 2nd League, for the 4 × 100 m (40.91). He made his second appearance for the National Team at the 64th Balkan Championships in Sliven, Bulgaria, running the 4x100 and the 100 m and 200 m out of competition. In the 100 m he lowered his personal best to 10.46 (2nd fastest at the Balkan Championships overall) and thus qualified for the European U23 Championships (10.55) in Ostrava, Czech Republic. That is also the 5th fastest time in history in Serbia, a National U23 Record and the fastest time in Serbia in 2011. In the 200 m event he broke the 22s-barrier with a slightly wind assisted race 21.97 (+2.1). His last major competition was the European Championships U23 in Ostrava where he finished 20th after having injured his hamstring.

During the outdoor season he competed at three national championships. At the Serbian U23 championships he finished first in the 400 m and 4 × 100 m, and second in the 100 m event. At the Serbian championships he won the gold medal in the 200 m, the silver in the 100 m, and the bronze in the decathlon event.

=== 2012 ===
Sarovic opened up the season with a personal best of 6.95 seconds in the 60 m. He followed up by winning gold at the Belgrade Championships (6.92 PB) and the Open Championship of Vojvodina (6.91 PB). In February he travelled to Sweden to compete at the Gothenburg Regional Championships; despite running a slow race in the 200 m and having a bad start in the 60 m, he lowered his indoor personal best twice in the 200 m to 22.57 to win gold, and also in the 60 m to 6.89 for second place.

On February 18 Sarovic made his first appearance in the 60 m dash for the Serbian National Team at the Balkan Championships in Istanbul, Turkey. He won the bronze medal, his first at an international competition. In the semifinal he fell out of the blocks, but recuperated to qualify for the final with the second-best time and an equalled personal best of 6.89. In the final he placed third with 6.90.

The summer season started off with a victory at the Belgrade Cup in the 100 m with 10.79. At the Serbian Team Championships he won the 100 m at 10.96, running into a headwind of -1.0. At the first international competition of the season, the European Champion Clubs Cup in Dubnica nad Váhom, Slovakia, he won his race in the 100 m at 10.76 to finish 4th in total. At the Serbian Cup he placed first in the 100 m with the time 10.73. Second in this race was Milos Savic, a Serbian sprinter that had not lost a single race on national competitions in six years. In the 200 m he placed third with 21.95 (+2.1) after a poorly distributed race, 0.03 s from the gold.

At the Serbian Championships in Novi Sad, the competition for the 100 m was stronger than ever; 9 sprinters under 11s at the start of the season, with a couple more to join after the qualifying rounds. In the semifinals, Sarovic sprinted with ease, winning the race at 10.79. In the finals he gained pole position after 10 m and maintained the lead to win the gold medal at 10.49 with a slightly wind-assisted race (+2.4). In the 4×100 m relay he won the bronze medal together with Suad Gasi, Predrag Jovanovic, and Filip Istvanovic. In the 200 m event, Sarovic qualified for the final with 22.48 into a slight headwind. In the final he lowered his personal best by 0.42 s to 21.52 and defended his title from 2011. This result brought him up from 46th to 19th in the Serbian all-time lists.

In the beginning of July, Sarovic travelled to Gothenburg, Sweden, to compete at Världsungdomsspelen at Ullevi Stadium, a competition that attracts many of the top athletes from the region and beyond. In the 100 m he ran a controlled race at 10.92 to qualify for the finals. In the finals he lost his only race in the 2012 season: 10.89 and a fourth place. In the 200 m, he won the qualifying race at 22.04 and finished fifth in the finals with 21.99.

At the Serbian U23 Championships he won his first gold medal in the 100 m dash in that competition, and a silver in the 4×100 m relay.

He finished the 2012 season by competing at the 65th Balkan Championships, and making his first appearances for the Serbian National Team in the 100 m, and 200 m dashes. He made his third appearance in the 4×100 m relay. In the 100 m he got off to a bad start, but caught up with the Turkish and Bulgarian sprinters in the lead during the last 20 m to win the race at 10.76 (+0.3), and become the Balkan champion in the discipline; this was his second medal at the Balkan Championships (the first being a bronze from the Balkan Indoor Championships in Istanbul in March earlier that year). Together with fellow countrymen Milan Ristic, Marko Antic, and Aleksandar Stojanovic, Sarovic got the bronze medal in the 4 × 100 m relay with the time 40.94. The next day he competed in the 200 m dash, where he finished 5th in a race with very heavy winds.

=== Results ===
PB	60 m	100 m	200 m
2008	7.34	11.51	23.31
2009	7.04	11.40	23.09i
2010	‡	10.83	22.44
2011	6.96	10.46	21.94
2012	6.89	10.49w	21.52

Average	60 m	100 m	200 m
2008	7.434	11.621	23.385
2009	7.174	11.453	23.240
2010	‡	11.057	22.637
2011	7.019	10.850	22.153
2012	6.939	10.748	21.873

‡Injured

Awards
Preceded by (Serbia) Milos Savic	Belgrade U23 Athlete Of The Year; 2010	Succeeded by (Serbia) Emir Bekrić
