= Konstantin Petryashov =

Russian sprinter

Konstantin Evgenevich Petryashov (Russian: Константин Евгеньевич Петряшов; born 16 December 1984, in Leningrad) is a Russian sprinter.

== Personal bests ==
Distance	Time	Place	Date
100 m	10.33	Viljandi	2 July 2013
200 m	20.65	Viljandi	2 July 2013

== International competitions ==
Representing Russia
Year	Competition	Venue	Position	Event	Notes
2009	Universiade	Belgrade, Serbia	1st	4 × 100 m relay	39.21
2009	Universiade	Belgrade, Serbia	6th	100 m	10.42
2009	European Team Championships Super League	Leiria, Portugal	6th	4 × 100 m relay	39.12
2011	Universiade	Shenzhen, China	—	4 × 100 m relay	DQ
2011	European Team Championships Super League	Stockholm, Sweden	5th	4 × 100 m relay	39.11
2012	European Athletics Championships	Helsinki, Finland	4th	4 × 100 m relay	38.67
2013	World Championships	Moscow, Russia	19th	4 × 100 m relay	39.01
2014	European Team Championships Super League	Braunschweig, Germany	8th	4 × 100 m relay	39.35
2014	World Indoor Championships	Sopot, Poland	5th	4 × 100 m relay	3:07.12
