= Thomas Nikitin =

Swedish sprinter (born 1982)

Thomas Nikitin (born 15 November 1982) is a Swedish sprinter who specialized in the 400 metres, and from 2007 to 2011 also in the 400 metres hurdles. He competed as a relay runner at one World Championships and one European Championships, also taking five individual Swedish titles outdoors (three hurdles, two flat) and three indoors.

== Career ==
Nikitin finished fourth at the 1999 European Youth Olympic Festival, in the 200 metres; his season's best was 21.93 seconds from the Finland–Sweden Youth International. Progressing to 21.88 as well as 48.40 in the 400 metres in 2000; in 2001 Nikitin improved to 47.75 and 21.87 shortly before the European Junior Championships, where he finished fifth in the 4 × 400 metres relay and competed individually without reaching the final. Nikitin also became Swedish U23 champion and took the bronze at the 2001 Swedish championships. He improved to 21.39 and 47.52 before upgrading to silver at the 2001 Swedish championships, as well as finishing fourth in his first senior Finland–Sweden International, the latter in another personal best of 47.21.

He was stable on a slightly lower level at the largest meets in 2003; running in 47.47 at the 2003 European U23 Championships without reaching the final; 47.49 at the Swedish championships where he took bronze; and 47.41 at the Finland–Sweden International where he took silver. He also became double Swedish U23 champion. After taking his first Swedish indoor title in 2004, he took more silvers at the Swedish championships (47.05) and Finland–Sweden International (47.19).

In 2005, having become back-to-back Swedish indoor champion, Nikitin broke the 47-second barrier with 46.80 during the national events segment of DN Galan. He was selected for the 2005 World Championships in the relay, where the Swedish team did not reach the final. In the closure of the 2005 season, 46.98 seconds was enough for a bronze at the Swedish nationals, followed by a fourth place at the Finland–Sweden International.

Nikitin competed at the 2006 European Cup First League. Another silver at the Swedish nationals was enough to secure a berth at the 2006 European Championships, held on home soil in Gothenburg, where he was eliminated in the heats both individually and in the relay. A personal best of 46.72 in the 400 metres came to no avail, and the relay race was squandered mainly due to a bad baton pass between Nikitin and Andreas Mokdasi. His season highlight came in the last meet, winning the Finland–Sweden International in another personal best of 46.51 seconds.

Nikitin's first double national title in the 400 metres came in 2007, taking both the indoor and outdoor national championships. He did the latter in a lifetime best of 46.14 seconds. At the same time, Nikitin had taken up the 400 metres hurdles. Following a debut in 52.44 seconds in June 2007, he took the silver medal at the 2007 nationals in 52.28. Lastly, Nikitin entered the Finland–Sweden International in both events. He first finished second in the 400 metres flat before winning the hurdles event. His victory at the Finland–Sweden International was described by media as a surprise. Being a newcomer, he set a personal best by almost one second (51.33), but "had severe problems with his technique and had to tiptoe".

Nikitin's 2008 season was modest up until the Swedish championships, when he managed to win the low hurdles race in 50.91 seconds. As a result of him competing in the hurdles, his club Spårvägens FK protested against a decision to stage the 400 metres flat without a semi-final. The club claimed that Nikitin would be drawn into a worse lane in the 400 metres, and the arrangers re-instated the semi-final. This, however, caused Sweden's number one Johan Wissman to withdraw from the competition, not wanting three whole races shortly before the 2008 Olympics. Without Wissman, who was capable of running two seconds faster than Nikitin, the latter won the 400 metres to become double outdoor champion of 2008.

Nikitin competed in two events at the 2009 European Team Championships Super League; also won the Swedish 400 hurdles title in 2009, finished third in two events at the 2009 Finland–Sweden International, and won back-to-back hurdles titles at the 2010 nationals and Finland–Sweden International. He also ran the hurdles at the 2011 European Team Championships Super League and completed briefly in early 2012 before retiring. His lifetime best results remained 21.39 in the 200 metres (2002), 46.14 in the 400 metres (2007) and 50.91 in the 400 metres hurdles (2008).

Thomas Nikitin was indicted into the Swedish version of the hall of fame, receiving a Stora grabbars märke. He represented the club Spårvägens FK.
