= Shintaro Kimura =

Japanese sprinter

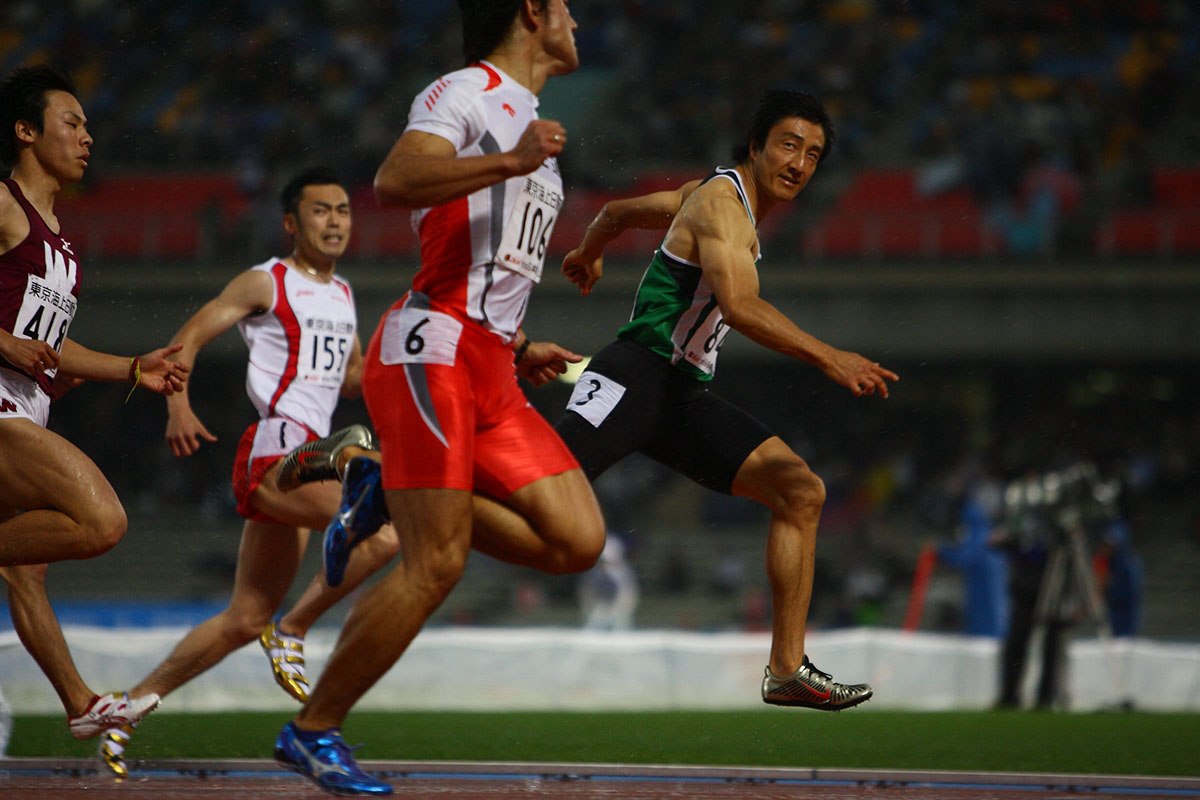
- The 92nd Japan Athletics Championships (left end)

Personal information
- Nationality: Japanese
- Born: 30 June 1987 (age 38) Miyake, Nara, Japan
- Height: 1.71 m (5 ft 7 in)
- Weight: 68 kg (150 lb)

Sport
- Sport: Running
- Event(s): 100 metres, 200 metres

Shintaro Kimura (木村 慎太郎, Kimura Shintarō; born June 30, 1987) is a Japanese sprinter who specialises in the 100 metres and 200 metres.

== Achievements ==
Year	Competition	Venue	Position	Event	Notes
Representing Japan
2009	Universiade	Belgrade, Serbia	12th (sf)	100 m	10.49
2009	World Championships	Berlin, Germany	37th (qf)	100 m	10.54
2009	East Asian Games	Hong Kong, China	2nd	100 m	10.39
2010	Continental Cup	Split, Croatia	2nd	4 × 100 m relay	39.28
