= Wilhelm van der Vyver =

South African sprinter

Wilhelm van der Vyver (born 22 September 1989 in Grabouw) is a South African sprinter who specializes in the 100 metres.

== Achievements ==
Year	Competition	Venue	Position	Event	Notes
Representing South Africa
2006	World Junior Championships	Beijing, China	16th (h)	4 × 100 m relay	40.36
2008	World Junior Championships	Bydgoszcz, Poland	2nd	100m	10.42 (wind: -0.8 m/s)
2008	World Junior Championships	Bydgoszcz, Poland	3rd	4 × 100 m relay	39.70
2009	Universiade	Belgrade, Serbia	10th (sf)	100 m	10.46
2009	Universiade	Belgrade, Serbia	3rd	4 × 100 m relay	39.52
2010	Continental Cup	Split, Croatia	3rd	4 × 100 m relay	39.82
