= Thuso Mpuang =

South African sprinter

Medal record

Representing South Africa

Men's athletics

African Championships
| Gold medal – first place | 2008 Addis Ababa | 200 m |
| Gold medal – first place | 2008 Addis Ababa | 4×100 m |
| Gold medal – first place | 2010 Nairobi | 4×100 m |
| Gold medal – first place | 2012 Porto-Novo | 4×100 m |

Thuso Mpuang (born 15 August 1985) is a South African sprinter who specializes in the 200 metres.

Mpuang represented South Africa at the 2008 Summer Olympics in Beijing. He competed at the 4 × 100 metres relay together with Leigh Julius, Ishmael Kumbane and Hannes Dreyer. In their qualification heat they did not finish due to a mistake in the baton exchange and they were eliminated. He also took part in the 200 metres individual, running the distance in 20.87 seconds and only placing sixth in his heat. Still his time was among the best losing times and he achieved a second round spot. With 21.04 seconds he finished seventh in his second round heat, failing to qualify for the semi-finals.

== Achievements ==
| Year | Competition | Venue | Position | Event | Notes |
Representing South Africa
| 2008 | African Championships | Addis Ababa, Ethiopia | 1st | 200 m | 20.53 |
| 2008 | African Championships | Addis Ababa, Ethiopia | 1st | 4 × 100 m relay | 38.75 |
| 2008 | Olympic Games | Beijing, China | 30th (qf) | 200 m | 21.04 |
| 2008 | Olympic Games | Beijing, China | – (h) | 4 × 100 m relay | DNF |
| 2009 | Universiade | Belgrade, Serbia | 3rd | 200 m | 20.69 |
| 2009 | Universiade | Belgrade, Serbia | 3rd | 4 × 100 m relay | 39.52 |
| 2009 | World Championships | Berlin, Germany | 25th (h) | 200 m | 20.91 |
| 2009 | World Championships | Berlin, Germany | 14th (h) | 4 × 100 m relay | 39.71 |
| 2010 | African Championships | Nairobi, Kenya | 7th | 200 m | 21.09 |
| 2010 | African Championships | Nairobi, Kenya | 1st | 4 × 100 m relay | 39.12 |
| 2011 | Universiade | Shenzhen, China | 2nd | 200 m | 20.59 |
| 2011 | Universiade | Shenzhen, China | 1st | 4 × 100 m relay | 39.25 |
| 2011 | World Championships | Daegu, South Korea | 37th (h) | 200 m | 21.07 |
| 2011 | World Championships | Daegu, South Korea | 11th (h) | 4 × 100 m relay | 38.72 |
| 2012 | African Championships | Porto-Novo, Benin | 8th | 200 m | 21.39 |
| 2012 | African Championships | Porto-Novo, Benin | 1st | 4 × 100 m relay | 39.26 |

=== Personal bests ===
- 100 metres 10.35 1.80, Pretoria 27 March 2008
- 200 metres 20.64 0.60, Pretoria 28 March 2008

=== Progression report ===
100 meters

- 2008 10.35 1.80, Pretoria 2008-03-27
- 2007 10.42 -0.20, Pretoria 2007-04-13
- 2006 10.65, Pretoria 2006-04-07

200 meters

- 2009 20.92 0.60, Stellenbosch 2009-04-04
- 2008 20.64 0.60, Pretoria 2008-03-28
- 2007 20.75, Gaborone 2007-04-05
- 2006 21.18 0.20, Pretoria 2006-04-08
- 2005 21.48 0.40, Marrakesh 2005-07-16

=== Honours ===
200 meters

- 11th IAAF World Junior Championships 21.71 -0.60, Beijing (Chaoyang Sport Center) 2006-08-17
- 4th IAAF World Youth Championships 21.78 1.20, Marrakesh 2005-07-16
