= Dany Gonçalves =

Portuguese sprinter (born 1985)

Personal information
- Nationality: Portugal
- Born: 14 March 1985 (age 41) Venezuela
- Height: 1.81
- Weight: 78

Sport
- Sport: Athletics
- Event: 100 metres
- Coached by: Adriano Gonçalves
Medal record
Silver Medal European 2007 - Hungary

Dany Gonçalves (born 14 March 1985) is a Portuguese sprinter. He represented his country in the 4 × 100 metres relay at the 2009 World Championships without qualifying for the final.

== International competitions ==
Year	Competition	Venue	Position	Event	Notes
Representing Portugal
2007	European U23 Championships	Debrecen, Hungary	2nd	4 × 100 m relay	39.37
2009	Universiade	Belgrade, Serbia	22nd (h)	100 m	10.66
2009	Universiade	Belgrade, Serbia	36th (h)	200 m	21.79
2009	Lusophony Games	Lisbon, Portugal	6th	100 m	10.54
2009	Lusophony Games	Lisbon, Portugal	2nd	4 × 100 m relay	39.31
2009	World Championships	Berlin, Germany	11th (h)	4 × 100 m relay	39.25
2012	European Championships	Helsinki, Finland	6th	4 × 100 m relay	39.96

== Personal bests ==
Outdoor

- 100 metres – 10.39 (+1.4 m/s, Leiria 2009)
- 200 metres – 21.44 (Lisbon 2012)

Indoor

- 60 metres – 6.81 (Pombal 2009)
- 200 metres – 21.48 (Pombal 2009)
