= Roman Smirnov (sprinter) =

Russian sprinter

Personal information
- Full name: Russian: Роман Петрович Смирнов
- Nationality: Russian
- Born: September 2, 1984 (age 41) St. Petersburg
- Height: 183 cm (6 ft 0 in)
- Weight: 72 kg (159 lb)

Sport
- Sport: Running
- Club: Russian Army, Moscow

Roman Petrovich Smirnov (born 2 September 1984) is a Russian sprinter who specializes in the 200 metres. His personal best time is 20.57 seconds, achieved in June 2008 in Chania. He also has 10.38 seconds in the 100 metres, achieved in June 2008 in Zhukovsky; and 6.74 seconds in the 60 metres, achieved in December 2005 in Omsk.

He was born in Leningrad. He won the silver medal at the 2003 European Junior Championships, and competed at the 2002 World Junior Championships, the 2006 European Championships and the 2008 Olympic Games without reaching the final round.

== International competitions ==
Representing Russia
Year	Competition	Venue	Position	Event	Notes
2002	World Junior Championships	Kingston, Jamaica	11th (sf)	100m	10.55 (wind: +1.4 m/s)
2002	World Junior Championships	Kingston, Jamaica	18th (sf)	200m	21.74 (wind: -4.1 m/s)
2003	European Junior Championships	Tampere, Finland	2nd	200 m	20.86
2003	Universiade	Daegu, South Korea	2nd	4 × 100 m relay	39.67
2006	European Championships	Gothenburg, Sweden	16th (qf)	4 × 100 m relay	20.93
2006	European Championships	Gothenburg, Sweden	4th	200 m	39.29
2007	World Championships	Osaka, Japan	12th (h)	4 × 100 m relay	39.08
2008	Olympic Games	Beijing, China	20th (qf)	200 m	20.62
2009	Universiade	Belgrade, Serbia	1st	4 × 100 m relay	39.21
2009	World Championships	Berlin, Germany	19th (qf)	200 m	20.72
2010	World Indoor Championships	Doha, Qatar	19th (sf)	60 m	6.74
2010	European Championships	Barcelona, Spain	–	4 × 100 m relay	DQ
2011	Universiade	Shenzhen, China	–	4 × 100 m relay	DQ
2013	World Championships	Moscow, Russia	19th (h)	4 × 100 m relay	39.01
