= Mayobanex de Óleo =

Dominican sprinter (born 1993)

Personal information
- Born: 26 May 1993 (age 33)

Sport
- Country: Dominican Republic
- Sport: Athletics

Mayobanex de Óleo (born 26 May 1993) is a Dominican sprinter. He competed in the men's 4 × 100 metres relay at the 2016 Summer Olympics.
