= Siriroj Darasuriyong =

Thai sprinter (born 1984)

Siriroj Darasuriyong (Thai: ศิริโรจน์ ดาราสุริยงค์; RTGS: Sirirot Darasuriyong, born July 13, 1984, in Bangkok) is a track and field sprint athlete who competes internationally for Thailand.

Darasuriyong represented Thailand at the 2008 Summer Olympics in Beijing. He competed at the 4 × 100 metres relay together with Apinan Sukaphai, Sompote Suwannarangsri and Sittichai Suwonprateep. In their qualification heat they placed fifth in a time of 39.40 seconds and they were eliminated.
