= Kamil Masztak =

Polish sprinter (born 1984)

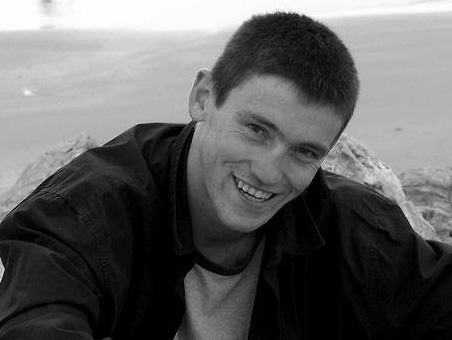

Personal information
- Born: July 16, 1984 (age 41)
- Height: 1.86 m (6 ft 1 in)
- Weight: 81 kg (179 lb)

Sport
- Country: Poland
- Sport: Athletics
- Event: 4 × 100m relay

Kamil Masztak (born 16 July 1984 in Białystok) is a Polish sprinter. He competed in the 4 × 100 m relay event at the 2012 Summer Olympics.

== Competition record ==
Year	Competition	Venue	Position	Event	Notes
Representing Poland
2005	European U23 Championships	Erfurt, Germany	10th (h)	200 m	21.14
2005	European U23 Championships	Erfurt, Germany	5th	4 × 100 m relay	39.64
2009	Universiade	Belgrade, Serbia	12th (sf)	200 m	21.12
2009	Universiade	Belgrade, Serbia	2nd	4 × 100 m relay	39.33
2012	Olympic Games	London, United Kingdom	9th (h)	4 × 100 m relay	38.31
2013	World Championships	Moscow, Russia	4th	4 × 100 m relay	38.04
2014	IAAF World Relays	Nassau, Bahamas	9th (h)	4 × 100 m relay	38.60
2014	European Championships	Zürich, Switzerland	6th (h)	4 × 100 m relay	38.75
2015	IAAF World Relays	Nassau, Bahamas	19th (h)	4 × 100 m relay	39.48
2015	IAAF World Relays	Nassau, Bahamas	4th	4 × 200 m relay	1:22.85
