= Giovanni Tomasicchio =

Italian sprinter

Personal information
- National team: Italy (2 caps)
- Born: 27 March 1982 (age 44) Bari, Italy
- Height: 1.67 m (5 ft 6 in)
- Weight: 66 kg (146 lb)

Sport
- Country: Italy
- Sport: Athletics
- Event: Sprint
- Club: C.S. Aeronautica Militare; Atletica Riccardi Milano; Ass. Atletica Libertas Orvieto

Achievements and titles
- Personal bests: 60 m: 6.71 (2005); 100 m: 10.25 (2010); 200 m; 21.46 (2010)
Medal record
European Team Championships
Gold medal – first place	2009 Leira	4 x 100 m relay

Giovanni Tomasicchio (born 27 March 1982) is an Italian sprinter who won a gold medal with the Italian national relay team at the 2009 European Team Championships and also won one individual national title at the senior level.

== Biography ==
Tomasicchio won a silver medal in the masters athletics, in 100 metres category M35, at the 2019 European Masters Athletics Championships held in Jesolo.

== Achievements ==
Year	Competition	Venue	Position	Event	Time	Notes
2009	European Team Championships (Super League)	(Portugal) Leiria	1st	4 × 100 m relay	38.77	

== National titles ==
- Italian Athletics Indoor Championships
  - 60 m: 2008

== See also ==
- Italy national relay team
