= Apinan Sukaphai =

Thai sprinter

Apinan Sukaphai (born August 21, 1983, in Chon Buri) is a track and field sprint athlete who competes internationally for Thailand.

Sukaphai represented Thailand at the 2008 Summer Olympics in Beijing. He competed at the 4 × 100 metres relay together with Siriroj Darasuriyong, Sompote Suwannarangsri and Sittichai Suwonprateep. In their qualification heat they placed fifth in a time of 39.40 seconds and they were eliminated.
