= Robert Kubaczyk =

Polish sprinter (born 1986)

Personal information
- Nationality: Polish
- Born: 4 August 1986 (age 39) Wolsztyn, Poland
- Height: 1.77 m (5 ft 9 1/2 in)
- Weight: 73 kg (161 lb)

Sport
- Sport: Running
- Event: Sprints
Medal record
Men's athletics
Representing Poland
World Championships
Universiade
Silver medal – second place	2009 Belgrade	4x100 m

Robert Kubaczyk (born 4 August 1986 in Wolsztyn) is a Polish athlete, sprinter, member of the Polish Team in the 2012 Summer Olympics. He represents the club of AZS Poznań and Poland in the 4 × 100 m relay race.

== Competition record ==
Year	Competition	Venue	Position	Event	Notes
Representing Poland
2007	European U23 Championships	Debrecen, Hungary	17th (h)	100 m	10.53
2009	Universiade	Belgrade, Serbia	8th	200 m	DNF
2009	Universiade	Belgrade, Serbia	2nd	4 × 100 m relay	39.33
2010	European Championships	Barcelona, Spain	22nd (sf)	100 m	10.55
2010	European Championships	Barcelona, Spain	5th	4 × 100 m relay	38.83
2011	World Championships	Daegu, South Korea	4th	4 × 100 m relay	38.50
2012	European Championships	Helsinki, Finland	–	4 × 100 m relay	DNF
2012	Olympic Games	London, United Kingdom	9th (h)	4 × 100 m relay	38.31
2013	World Championships	Moscow, Russia	11th (h)	4 × 100 m relay	38.51
2014	European Championships	Zürich, Switzerland	26th (h)	100 m	10.45
2014	European Championships	Zürich, Switzerland	6th	4 × 100 m relay	38.85

== Personal bests ==
Outdoor

- 100 metres – 10.35 (1.0 m/s) (Bydgoszcz 2009)
- 200 metres – 21.02 (-0.2 m/s) (Belgrade 2009)

Indoor

- 60 metres – 6.71 (Spała 2012)
- 200 metres – 21.27 (Spała 2012)
