= Ishmael Kumbane =

South African sprinter

Kagiso Kumbane (born 21 November 1988) is a track and field sprint athlete who competes internationally for South Africa.

Kumbane represented South Africa at the 2008 Summer Olympics in Beijing. He competed at the 4 × 100 metres relay together with Leigh Julius, Thuso Mpuang and Hannes Dreyer. In their qualification heat they did not finish due to a mistake in the baton exchange and they were eliminated.

- Personal Best – Outdoor
- Performance Wind Place Date
  - 100 Metres 10.35 1.80 Pretoria 27 March 2008
  - 200 Metres 20.64 0.60 Pretoria 28 March 2008
- Progression – Outdoor
- Season Performance Wind Place Date
  - 100 Metres 2008 10.35 1.80 Pretoria 27 March 2008
  - 2007 10.42 -0.20 Pretoria 13 April 2007
  - 2006 10.65 Pretoria 7 April 2006
  - 200 Metres 2009 20.92 0.60 Stellenbosch 4 April 2009
  - 2008 20.64 0.60 Pretoria 28 March 2008
  - 2007 20.75 Gaborone 5 April 2007
  - 2006 21.18 0.20 Pretoria 8 April 2006
  - 2005 21.48 0.40 Marrakesh 16 July 2005
- Honours
- Rank Performance Wind Place Date
  - 200 Metre||s
  - 11th IAAF World Junior Championships 3 h 21.71 -0.60 Beijing (Chaoyang Sport Center) 17 August 2006
  - 4th IAAF World Youth Championships 3 sf 21.78 1.20 Marrakesh 16 July 2005
