= Miloš Savić =

Serbian bobsledder

Miloš Savić (born 1 March 1987 in Kragujevac) is a Serbian bobsledder who has competed since 2009. He finished 18th in the four-man event at the 2010 Winter Olympics in Vancouver. Savić's only experience prior to the Olympics was 19th in a four-man event at Igls in November 2009 in a lesser cup event.

He is also a sprinter.
