= Athletics at the 2009 Summer Universiade =

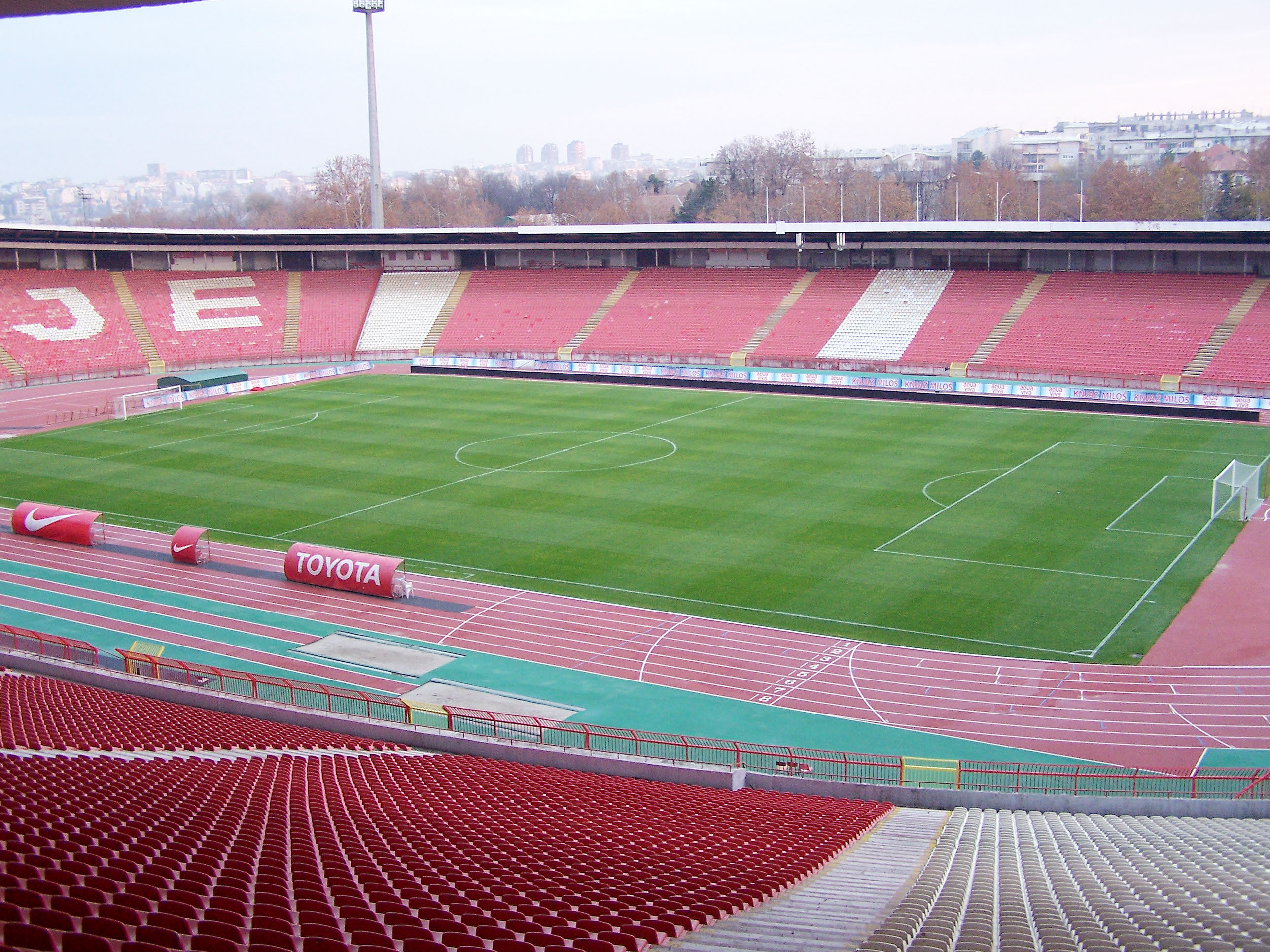
- Dates: 7 July – 12 July
- Host city: Belgrade, Serbia
- Venue: Stadion Crvena Zvezda
- Level: Senior
- Events: 46
- Participation: 982 athletes from 96 nations
- Records set: 4 UR's

The athletics competition at the 2009 Summer Universiade was held at the Stadion Crvena Zvezda in Belgrade, Serbia from July 7 to July 12, 2009.

== Medal summary ==
=== Men's events ===
Event	Gold		Silver		Bronze	
100 metres	Rolando Palacios; Honduras	10.30	Amr Seoud; Egypt	10.31	Masashi Eriguchi; Japan	10.33
200 metres	Ramil Guliyev; Azerbaijan	20.04 NR	Amr Seoud; Egypt	20.52	Thuso Mpuang; South Africa	20.69
400 metres	Yuzo Kanemaru; Japan	45.68	Clemens Zeller; Austria	46.12	Daniel Harper; Canada	46.22
800 metres	Sajjad Moradi; Iran	1:48.02	Goran Nava; Serbia	1:48.06	Fabiano Peçanha; Brazil	1:48.07
1500 metres	Vyacheslav Sokolov; Russia	3:42.49	Samir Khadar; Algeria	3:42.50	Goran Nava; Serbia	3:42.88
5000 metres	Halil Akkaş; Turkey	14:06.96	Piedra Bayron; Ecuador	14:07.11	Elroy Gelant; South Africa	14:07.97
10,000 metres	Sibabalwe Mzazi; South Africa	28:21.44	Denis Mayaud; France	28:21.50	Lungisa Mdedelwa; South Africa	28:21.52
Half marathon	Zhao Ran; China	1:04:28	Tomoya Onishi; Japan	1:04:30	Francesco Bona; Italy	1:04:35
3000 metres steeplechase	Ion Luchianov; Moldova	8:25.79	Halil Akkaş; Turkey	8:25.80	Steffen Uliczka; Germany	8:26.18
110 metres hurdles	Yin Jing; China	13.38	Lehann Fourie; South Africa	13.66	Emanuele Abate; Italy	13.70
400 metres hurdles	Tristan Thomas; Australia	48.75	Kazuaki Yoshida; Japan	49.78	Michael Bultheel; Belgium	49.79
20 km walk	Sergey Bakulin; Russia	1:20:52 UR	Andrey Ruzavin; Russia	1:21:08	Moacir Zimmermann; Brazil	1:21:35
4 × 100 m relay	Maxim Mokrousov; Ivan Teplykh; Roman Smirnov; Konstantin Petryashov; Russia	39.21	Robert Kubaczyk; Artur Zaczek; Kamil Masztak; Dariusz Kuć; Poland	39.33	Leigh Julius; Thuso Mpuang; Kagisho Kumbane; Wilhelm van der Vyver; South Africa	39.52
4 × 400 m relay	Chris Troode; Brendan Cole; Tristan Thomas; Sean Wroe; Clay Watkins; John Burstow; Australia	3:03.67	Witold Bańka; Kacper Kozłowski; Piotr Kędzia; Rafał Wieruszewski; Piotr Wiaderek; Poland	3:05.69	Hideyuki Hirose; Yusuke Ishitsuka; Kazuaki Yoshida; Yuzo Kanemaru; Japan	3:06.46
High jump	Eduard Malchenko; Russia	2.23	Michael Mason; Canada	2.23	Ivan Ilichev; Russia	2.20
Pole vault	Aleksandr Gripich; Russia	5.60	Giorgio Piantella; Italy	5.55	Hendrik Gruber; Germany	5.45
Long jump	Kim Deok-Hyeon; South Korea	8.41w	Ndiss Kaba Badji; Senegal	8.19	Marcin Starzak; Poland	8.10
Triple jump	Nelson Évora; Portugal	17.22	Héctor Dairo Fuentes; Cuba	17.13	Vladimir Letnicov; Moldova	16.80
Shot put	Soslan Tsyrikhov; Russia	19.59	Zhang Jun; China	19.58	Krzysztof Krzywosz; Poland	19.38
Discus throw	Mohammad Samimi; Iran	65.33	Mahmoud Samimi; Iran	64.67	Markus Münch; Germany	63.76
Hammer throw	Yury Shayunou; Belarus	76.92	James Steacy; Canada	74.88	Oleksiy Sokyrsky; Ukraine	73.73
Javelin throw	Ainārs Kovals; Latvia	81.58	Stuart Farquhar; New Zealand	79.48	Park Jae-Myong; South Korea	79.29
Decathlon	Mikalai Shubianok; Belarus	7960	Brent Newdick; New Zealand	7874	Attila Szabó; Hungary	7748

=== Women's events ===
Event	Gold		Silver		Bronze	
100 metres	Lina Grincikaitė; Lithuania	11.31	Momoko Takahashi; Japan	11.52	Sónia Tavares; Portugal	11.54
200 metres	Monique Williams; New Zealand	23.11	Isabel Le Roux; South Africa	23.18	Sabina Veit; Slovenia	23.34
400 metres	Fatou Bintou Fall; Senegal	51.65	Esther Akinsulie; Canada	51.70	Carline Muir; Canada	52.07
800 metres	Madeleine Pape; Australia	2:01.91	Olga Cristea; Moldova	2:03.49	Rebecca Johnstone; Canada	2:03.67
1500 metres	Marina Muncan; Serbia	4:15.53	Kaila McKnight; Australia	4:16.10	Elena Garcia Grimau; Spain	4:17.02
5000 metres	Sara Moreira; Portugal	15:32.78	Kasumi Nishihara; Japan	15:46.95	Natalia Medvedeva; Russia	15:49.60
10,000 metres	Kasumi Nishihara; Japan	33:14.62	Tatiana Shutova; Russia	33:29.99	Volha Minina; Belarus	33:32.35
Half marathon	Chisato Saito; Japan	1:13:44	Kikuyo Tsuzaki; Japan	1:14:03	Sayo Nomura; Japan	1:14:23
3000 metres steeplechase	Sara Moreira; Portugal	9:32.62 UR	Ancuța Bobocel; Romania	9:38.14	Türkan Erişmiş; Turkey	9:38.87
100 metres hurdles	Nevin Yanıt; Turkey	12.89	Sonata Tamošaitytė; Lithuania	13.10	Andrea Miller; New Zealand	13.13
400 metres hurdles	Vania Stambolova; Bulgaria	55.14	Jonna Tilgner; Germany	56.02	Sara Slott Petersen; Denmark	56.40
20 km walk	Olga Mikhaylova; Russia	1:30:43 UR	Masumi Fuchise; Japan	1:31:42	Olga Povalyaeva; Russia	1:33:58
4 × 100 m relay	Audrey Alloh; Doris Tomasini; Giulia Arcioni; Maria Aurora Salvagno; Italy	43.83	Ewelina Ptak; Marika Popowicz; Dorota Jędrusińska; Marta Jeschke; Iwona Brzezińska; Poland	43.96	Laetitia Denis; Ayodelé Ikuesan; Amandine Elard; Lucienne M'belu; France	44.31
4 × 400 m relay	Carline Muir; Amonn Nelson; Kimberly Hyacinthe; Esther Akinsulie; Canada	3:33.09	Ekaterina Voronenkova; Alexandra Zaytseva; Nadezda Sozontova; Ekaterina Vukolova; Russia	3:34.45	Ndeye Fatouseck Soumah; Mame Fatou Faye; Fatou Diabaye; Fatou Bintou Fall; Senegal	3:36.33
High jump	Ariane Friedrich; Germany	2.00	Yekaterina Yevseyeva; Kazakhstan	1.91	Julia Wanner; Germany	1.91
Pole vault	Jiřina Ptáčníková; Czech Republic	4.55	Nicole Büchler; Switzerland	4.50	Kristina Gadschiew; Germany	4.50
Long jump	Ivana Španović; Serbia	6.64	Irina Kryachkova; Russia	6.47	Ruky Abdulai; Canada	6.44
Triple jump	Yarianna Martínez; Cuba	14.40	Natalia Kutyakova; Russia	14.14	Anastasia Matveeva; Russia	13.94
Shot put	Mailín Vargas; Cuba	18.91	Chiara Rosa; Italy	18.21	Alena Kopets; Belarus	17.48
Discus throw	Dani Samuels; Australia	62.48	Żaneta Glanc; Poland	60.57	Kateryna Karsak; Ukraine	60.47
Hammer throw	Betty Heidler; Germany	75.83 UR	Martina Hrašnová; Slovakia	72.85	Kathrin Klaas; Germany	70.97
Javelin throw	Sunette Viljoen; South Africa	62.52	Vira Rebryk; Ukraine	61.02	Mareike Rittweg; Germany	59.44
Heptathlon	Jessica Samuelsson; Sweden	6004	Jana Korešová; Czech Republic	5956	Saludes Cristina Barcena; Spain	5828

== Medal table ==
Rank	Nation	Gold	Silver	Bronze	Total
1	Russia (RUS)	7	5	4	16
2	Australia (AUS)	4	1	0	5
3	Japan (JPN)	3	6	3	12
4	Portugal (POR)	3	0	1	4
5	South Africa (RSA)	2	2	4	8
6	Germany (GER)	2	1	7	10
7	Serbia (SRB)	2	1	1	4
7	Turkey (TUR)	2	1	1	4
9	China (CHN)	2	1	0	3
9	Cuba (CUB)	2	1	0	3
9	Iran (IRI)	2	1	0	3
12	Belarus (BLR)	2	0	2	4
13	Canada (CAN)	1	3	4	8
14	Italy (ITA)	1	2	2	5
15	New Zealand (NZL)	1	2	1	4
16	Moldova (MDA)	1	1	1	3
16	Senegal (SEN)	1	1	1	3
18	Czech Republic (CZE)	1	1	0	2
18	Lithuania (LTU)	1	1	0	2
20	South Korea (KOR)	1	0	1	2
21	Azerbaijan (AZE)	1	0	0	1
21	Bulgaria (BUL)	1	0	0	1
21	Honduras (HON)	1	0	0	1
21	Latvia (LAT)	1	0	0	1
21	Sweden (SWE)	1	0	0	1
26	Poland (POL)	0	4	2	6
27	Egypt (EGY)	0	2	0	2
28	Ukraine (UKR)	0	1	2	3
29	France (FRA)	0	1	1	2
30	Algeria (ALG)	0	1	0	1
30	Austria (AUT)	0	1	0	1
30	Ecuador (ECU)	0	1	0	1
30	Kazakhstan (KAZ)	0	1	0	1
30	Romania (ROU)	0	1	0	1
30	Slovakia (SVK)	0	1	0	1
30	Switzerland (SUI)	0	1	0	1
37	Brazil (BRA)	0	0	2	2
37	Spain (ESP)	0	0	2	2
39	Belgium (BEL)	0	0	1	1
39	Denmark (DEN)	0	0	1	1
39	Hungary (HUN)	0	0	1	1
39	Slovenia (SLO)	0	0	1	1
Totals (42 entries)		46	46	46	138

== Participating nations ==
- Afghanistan (1)
- Albania (3)
- Algeria (14)
- Australia (37)
- Austria (5)
- Azerbaijan (2)
- Bahrain (1)
- Belarus (10)
- Belgium (9)
- Benin (1)
- Bosnia and Herzegovina (17)
- Botswana (11)
- Brazil (5)
- Bulgaria (11)
- Burkina Faso (2)
- Canada (27)
- Chile (2)
- China (37)
- Chinese Taipei (8)
- Colombia (2)
- Costa Rica (5)
- Croatia (7)
- Cuba (3)
- Cyprus (8)
- Czech Republic (16)
- Denmark (14)
- Ecuador (5)
- Egypt (3)
- Estonia (15)
- Finland (12)
- France (9)
- Germany (20)
- Ghana (18)
- Greece (23)
- Guatemala (3)
- Honduras (3)
- Hong Kong (7)
- Hungary (14)
- Iran (6)
- Ireland (13)
- Italy (30)
- Japan (30)
- Jordan (1)
- Kazakhstan (14)
- Latvia (12)
- Lebanon (5)
- Libya (1)
- Lithuania (22)
- Macau (6)
- Macedonia (1)
- Maldives (2)
- Mexico (5)
- Moldova (7)
- Montenegro (4)
- Morocco (9)
- Namibia (5)
- Netherlands Antilles (2)
- New Zealand (10)
- North Korea (3)
- Norway (1)
- Oman (7)
- Pakistan (4)
- Paraguay (4)
- Peru (1)
- Poland (29)
- Portugal (11)
- Puerto Rico (1)
- Qatar (2)
- Republic of the Congo (3)
- Romania (19)
- Russia (68)
- El Salvador (1)
- Saudi Arabia (10)
- Senegal (7)
- Serbia (47)
- Singapore (1)
- Slovakia (8)
- Slovenia (19)
- South Africa (34)
- South Korea (18)
- Spain (18)
- Sri Lanka (2)
- Sudan (1)
- Swaziland (2)
- Sweden (12)
- Switzerland (2)
- Tajikistan (1)
- Thailand (11)
- Togo (1)
- Turkey (9)
- Uganda (23)
- Ukraine (16)
- United States (2)
- Vietnam (2)
- Zambia (5)
- Zimbabwe (2)

== See also ==
- 2007 in the sport of athletics
- FISU World University Games
- University and college sport
