= Maksim Mokrousov =

Russian bobsledder

Maxim Mokrousov
Personal information
- Born: 4 October 1983 (age 42)
- Height: 1.84 m (6 ft 0 in)
- Weight: 96 kg (212 lb)

Sport
- Country: Russia
- Sport: Bobsleigh
- Event: Four-man
- Turned pro: 2010
Medal record
World Championships
| Silver medal – second place | 2013 St. Moritz | Four-man |
| Disqualified | 2016 Igls | Mixed team |

Maxim Vladimirovich Mokrousov (Russian: Максим Владимирович Мокроусов; born 4 October 1983) is a bobsledder and former athlete who has competed since 2010.
