= 2007 European Athletics U23 Championships – Men's 4 × 100 metres relay =

The men's 4 x 100 metres relay event at the 2007 European Athletics U23 Championships was held in Debrecen, Hungary, at Gyulai István Atlétikai Stadion on 15 July.

== Medalists ==
Gold	Ryan Scott; Craig Pickering; Rikki Fifton; James Ellington; Great Britain
Silver	Dany Gonçalves; Arnaldo Abrantes; Ricardo Martins; Yazaldes Nascimento; Portugal
Bronze	Hannu Hämäläinen; Visa Hongisto; Rami Jokinen; Jonathan Åstrand; Finland

== Results ==
=== Final ===
15 July

Rank	Nation	Competitors	Time	Notes
1st place, gold medalist(s)	Great Britain	Ryan Scott; Craig Pickering; Rikki Fifton; James Ellington	38.95	=CR
2nd place, silver medalist(s)	Portugal	Dany Gonçalves; Arnaldo Abrantes; Ricardo Martins; Yazaldes Nascimento	39.37	
3rd place, bronze medalist(s)	Finland	Hannu Hämäläinen; Visa Hongisto; Rami Jokinen; Jonathan Åstrand	39.53	
4	Czech Republic	Libor Žilka; Jan Schiller; Vojtěch Šulc; Ondřej Benda	39.92	
5	Greece	Dimitrios Regas; Yeoryios Koutsotheodorou; Ioannis Apostolou; Nikolaos Filandarakis	40.41	
	Poland	Fabian Ziółkowski; Mikołaj Lewański; Mateusz Pluta; Dariusz Kuć	DNF	
	France	Christophe Bonnet; Guillaume Guffroy; Manuel Reynaert; Martial Mbandjock	DNF	
	Germany	Christian Blum; Daniel Schnelting; Nils Müller; Alex-Platini Menga	DNF	

=== Heats ===
15 July
Qualified: first 2 in each heat and 4 best to the Final

==== Heat 1 ====
Rank	Nation	Competitors	Time	Notes
1	Great Britain	Ryan Scott; Craig Pickering; Rikki Fifton; James Ellington	39.27	Q
2	Germany	Sven Mehlhorn; Daniel Schnelting; Nils Müller; Alex-Platini Menga	39.57	Q
3	Czech Republic	Libor Žilka; Jan Schiller; Vojtěch Šulc; Ondřej Benda	40.05	q
4	Finland	Hannu Hämäläinen; Visa Hongisto; Rami Jokinen; Jonathan Åstrand	40.19	q
5	Hungary	Gábor Oláh; Gergely Resán; Csaba Jeleni; Péter Miklós	40.27	
6	Lithuania	Egidijus Dilys; Rytis Sakalauskas; Žilvinas Adomavičius; Justas Burgas	40.51	
	Norway	Rasmus Rypdal; Henrik Johnsen; Christian Settemsli Mogstad; Tormod Hjortnæs Larsen	DNF	

==== Heat 2 ====
Rank	Nation	Competitors	Time	Notes
1	Poland	Fabian Ziółkowski; Mikołaj Lewański; Mateusz Pluta; Dariusz Kuć	39.27	Q
2	Portugal	Dany Gonçalves; Arnaldo Abrantes; Ricardo Martins; Yazaldes Nascimento	39.52	Q
3	France	Christophe Bonnet; Guillaume Guffroy; Manuel Reynaert; Martial Mbandjock	39.57	q
4	Greece	Dimitrios Regas; Yeoryios Koutsotheodorou; Ioannis Apostolou; Konstadinos Douvalidis	40.10	q
5	Netherlands	Reggae Monsels; Leomar Davis; Steven de Jesus; Alex Ward	40.46	
6	Spain	Javier Ramos; David Aguirreburualde; José López; Jonathan Martínek	40.55	
	Latvia	Konstantīns Germanovičs; Sandis Sabājevs; Jānis Mezītis; Andrejs Maškancevs	DNF	

== Participation ==
According to an unofficial count, 58 athletes from 14 countries participated in the event.

- Czech Republic (4)
- Finland (4)
- France (4)
- Germany (5)
- Great Britain (4)
- Greece (5)
- Hungary (4)
- Latvia (4)
- Lithuania (4)
- Netherlands (4)
- Norway (4)
- Poland (4)
- Portugal (4)
- Spain (4)
