= 2007 European Athletics U23 Championships – Men's 100 metres =

The men's 100 metres event at the 2007 European Athletics U23 Championships was held in Debrecen, Hungary, at Gyulai István Atlétikai Stadion on 12 and 13 July.

== Medalists ==
Gold	Simeon Williamson; Great Britain
Silver	Craig Pickering; Great Britain
Bronze	Martial Mbandjock; France

== Results ==
=== Final ===
13 July
Wind: 0.2 m/s

Rank	Name	Nationality	Time	Notes
1st place, gold medalist(s)	Simeon Williamson	Great Britain	10.10	CR
2nd place, silver medalist(s)	Craig Pickering	Great Britain	10.14	
3rd place, bronze medalist(s)	Martial Mbandjock	France	10.27	
4	Fabio Cerutti	Italy	10.40	
5	Dariusz Kuć	Poland	10.41	
6	Manuel Reynaert	France	10.47	
7	Christian Blum	Germany	10.48	
8	Efthimios Steryioulis	Greece	10.58	

=== Semifinals ===
12 July
Qualified: first 4 in each heat to the Final

==== Semifinal 1 ====
Wind: 0.5 m/s

Rank	Name	Nationality	Time	Notes
1	Craig Pickering	Great Britain	10.28	Q
2	Fabio Cerutti	Italy	10.29	Q
3	Manuel Reynaert	France	10.42	Q
4	Christian Blum	Germany	10.42	Q
5	Arnaldo Abrantes	Portugal	10.43	
6	Igor Gostev	Russia	10.46	
7	Guillaume Guffroy	France	10.52	
8	Mikołaj Lewański	Poland	10.54	

==== Semifinal 2 ====
Wind: 1.6 m/s

Rank	Name	Nationality	Time	Notes
1	Martial Mbandjock	France	10.16	Q
2	Simeon Williamson	Great Britain	10.23	Q
3	Dariusz Kuć	Poland	10.31	Q
4	Efthimios Steryioulis	Greece	10.39	Q
5	Ryan Scott	Great Britain	10.40	
6	Miklós Szebeny	Hungary	10.41	
7	Alex-Platini Menga	Germany	10.55	
8	Ruslan Abbasov	Azerbaijan	10.58	

=== Heats ===
12 July
Qualified: first 2 in each heat and 6 best to the Semifinals

==== Heat 1 ====
Wind: 1.2 m/s

Rank	Name	Nationality	Time	Notes
1	Martial Mbandjock	France	10.27	Q
2	Ryan Scott	Great Britain	10.28	Q
3	Miklós Szebeny	Hungary	10.43	q
4	Rami Jokinen	Finland	10.60	
5	Libor Žilka	Czech Republic	10.69	
6	Benjamin Grill	Austria	10.70	

==== Heat 2 ====
Wind: 0.4 m/s

Rank	Name	Nationality	Time	Notes
1	Simeon Williamson	Great Britain	10.36	Q
2	Manuel Reynaert	France	10.39	Q
3	Igor Gostev	Russia	10.44	q
4	Péter Miklós	Hungary	10.67	
5	Veselin Pankov	Bulgaria	10.68	
6	Alexander Trembach	Israel	10.79	
7	Matija Čop	Croatia	11.46	

==== Heat 3 ====
Wind: 0.3 m/s

Rank	Name	Nationality	Time	Notes
1	Alex-Platini Menga	Germany	10.40	Q
2	Arnaldo Abrantes	Portugal	10.40	Q
3	Guillaume Guffroy	France	10.44	q
4	Robert Kubaczyk	Poland	10.53	
5	Roman Bublyk	Ukraine	10.65	
6	José López	Spain	10.74	
7	Ronalds Arājs	Latvia	10.97	

==== Heat 4 ====
Wind: 1.9 m/s

Rank	Name	Nationality	Time	Notes
1	Christian Blum	Germany	10.37	Q
2	Efthimios Steryioulis	Greece	10.41	Q
3	Mikołaj Lewański	Poland	10.45	q
4	Ruslan Abbasov	Azerbaijan	10.51	q
5	Hannu Hämäläinen	Finland	10.55	
6	Rolf Fongué	Switzerland	10.83	
7	Boris Savić	Montenegro	10.92	

==== Heat 5 ====
Wind: 0.1 m/s

Rank	Name	Nationality	Time	Notes
1	Craig Pickering	Great Britain	10.23	Q
2	Fabio Cerutti	Italy	10.39	Q
3	Dariusz Kuć	Poland	10.45	q
4	Yazaldes Nascimento	Portugal	10.69	
5	Christian Settemsli Mogstad	Norway	10.78	
6	Andreas Paphitis	Cyprus	11.11	
	Timo Salonen	Finland	DNS	

== Participation ==
According to an unofficial count, 33 athletes from 23 countries participated in the event.

- Austria (1)
- Azerbaijan (1)
- Bulgaria (1)
- Croatia (1)
- Cyprus (1)
- Czech Republic (1)
- Finland (2)
- France (3)
- Germany (2)
- Great Britain (3)
- Greece (1)
- Hungary (2)
- Israel (1)
- Italy (1)
- Latvia (1)
- Montenegro (1)
- Norway (1)
- Poland (3)
- Portugal (2)
- Russia (1)
- Spain (1)
- Switzerland (1)
- Ukraine (1)
