= 2014 European Athletics Team Championships Super League =

Athletics team competitions

These are the complete results of the 2014 European Team Championships Super League on 21 and 22 June 2014 in Braunschweig, Germany. As with the previous championships there were a couple of rules applying specifically to this competition, such as the limit of three attempts in the throwing events, long jump and triple jump (only the top four were allowed the fourth attempt) and the limit of four misses total in the high jump and pole vault.

Two athletes, Quentin Bigot of France and Rutger Koppelaar of the Netherlands, were later found guilty of doping use. Their results were subsequently annulled and the points readjusted which cost France the third place and the bronze medal. Later more athletes from Russia and Turkey were found out to be doping and subsequently disqualified. The results of these athletes were also annulled but the reallocation of points did not change the position of any team.

== Final standings ==
Pos	Country	Pts	Note
1	Germany	373	Gold Medalist
2	Russia	343.5	Silver Medalist
3	Poland	297	Bronze Medalist
4	France	286	
5	Great Britain	285.5	
6	Ukraine	277	
7	Italy	243.5	
8	Spain	224.5	
9	Sweden	215	
10	Czech Republic	212.5	Relegated to 2015 First League
11	Netherlands	205	Relegated to 2015 First League
12	Turkey	128.5	Relegated to 2015 First League

== Men ==
=== 100 metres ===
Wind:
Heat 1: -0.3 m/s
Heat 2: +0.7 m/s

Rank	Heat	Lane	Name	Nationality	React	Time	Notes	Points
1	2	3	Jimmy Vicaut	France	0.189	10.03		12
2	2	4	Danny Talbot	Great Britain	0.161	10.30		11
3	2	1	Ramil Guliyev	Turkey	0.171	10.37		10
4	2	2	Vitaliy Korzh	Ukraine	0.139	10.45		9
5	2	5	Ángel David Rodríguez	Spain	0.158	10.46		8
6	1	1	Giovanni Codrington	Netherlands	0.162	10.46		7
7	1	6	Karol Zalewski	Poland	0.173	10.47		6
8	1	2	Delmas Obou	Italy	0.190	10.48		5
9	2	6	Martin Keller	Germany	0.146	10.49		4
10	1	4	Jan Veleba	Czech Republic	0.152	10.53		3
11	1	3	Mikhail Idrisov	Russia	0.145	10.54		2
12	1	5	Odain Rose	Sweden	0.164	10.56		1

=== 200 metres ===
Wind:
Heat 1: +1.2 m/s
Heat 2: +2.0 m/s

Rank	Heat	Lane	Name	Nationality	React	Time	Notes	Points
1	2	4	Karol Zalewski	Poland	0.170	20.56		12
2	2	7	Ramil Guliyev	Turkey	0.153	20.57	SB	11
3	2	6	James Ellington	Great Britain	0.155	20.60		10
4	2	2	Serhiy Smelyk	Ukraine	0.159	20.60	SB	9
5	2	5	Julian Reus	Germany	0.142	20.81		8
6	1	4	Diego Marani	Italy	0.152	21.02		7
7	1	5	Alexander Brorsson	Sweden	0.160	21.15	PB	6
8	1	2	Aleksandr Khyutte	Russia	0.155	21.39		5
9	1	6	Jan Veleba	Czech Republic	0.172	21.44		4
10	1	3	Iván Jesús Ramos	Spain	0.161	21.72		3
	1	7	Ben Bassaw	France	0.188	DQ		0
	2	3	Churandy Martina	Netherlands	0.158	DQ		0

=== 400 metres ===
Rank	Heat	Lane	Name	Nationality	React	Time	Notes	Points
1	2	6	Mame-Ibra Anne	France	0.177	45.71		12
2	2	5	Pavel Ivashko	Russia	0.220	45.95		11
3	2	7	Daniel Awde	Great Britain	0.151	46.10		10
4	2	4	Rafał Omelko	Poland	0.212	46.21		9
5	2	3	Matteo Galvan	Italy	0.162	46.28	SB	8
6	2	2	Kamghe Gaba	Germany	0.178	46.58		7
7	1	4	Terrence Agard	Netherlands	0.228	46.68		6
8	1	2	Yavuz Can	Turkey	0.173	46.90		5
9	1	3	Yevhen Hutsol	Ukraine	0.189	47.06		4
10	1	5	Johan Wissman	Sweden	0.157	47.39	SB	3
11	1	7	Jan Tesař	Czech Republic	0.165	47.46		2
12	1	6	Mark Ujakpor	Spain	0.150	48.00		1

=== 800 metres ===
Rank	Name	Nationality	Time	Notes	Points
1	Timo Benitz	Germany	1:46.24	PB	12
2	Adam Kszczot	Poland	1:46.36		11
3	Giordano Benedetti	Italy	1:46.45		10
4	Pierre-Ambroise Bosse	France	1:46.46		9
5	Kevin López	Spain	1:47.26	SB	8
6	Thijmen Kupers	Netherlands	1:47.29		7
7	Jan Kubista	Czech Republic	1:48.01		6
8	Johan Rogestedt	Sweden	1:48.72		5
9	Oleh Kafaya	Ukraine	1:48.81	SB	4
10	Stepan Poistogov	Russia	1:49.08		3
11	Mukhtar Mohammed	Great Britain	1:50.27		2
12	İlham Tanui Özbilen	Turkey	1:56.34		1

=== 1500 metres ===
Rank	Name	Nationality	Time	Notes	Points
1	Jakub Holuša	Czech Republic	3:37.74	CR	12
2	Homiyu Tesfaye	Germany	3:38.10		11
3	Marcin Lewandowski	Poland	3:38.19	PB	10
4	Florian Carvalho	France	3:38.59		9
5	Charlie Grice	Great Britain	3:38.63		8
6	Ilham Tanui Özbilen	Turkey	3:38.67		7
7	Oleksandr Osmolovych	Ukraine	3:39.83	PB	6
8	Álvaro Rodríguez	Spain	3:44.22		5
9	Johan Rogestedt	Sweden	3:45.22		4
10	Valentin Smirnov	Russia	3:46.25		3
11	René Stokvis	Netherlands	3:48.15		2
12	Ali Mohad Abdikadar Sheikh	Italy	3:55.69		1

=== 3000 metres ===
Rank	Name	Nationality	Time	Notes	Points
1	Richard Ringer	Germany	7:50.99	PB	12
2	Jakub Holuša	Czech Republic	7:51.43	PB	11
3	Antonio Abadía	Spain	7:52.22	PB	10
4	Jonathan Mellor	Great Britain	7:52.47	SB	9
5	Yohan Durand	France	7:52.69		8
6	Dennis Licht	Netherlands	7:54.91	PB	7
7	Stefano La Rosa	Italy	7:55.75		6
8	Ali Kaya	Turkey	8:00.00	SB	5
9	Oleksandr Borysyuk	Ukraine	8:02.39	PB	4
10	Mateusz Demczyszak	Poland	8:05.49	SB	3
11	Yegor Nikolayev	Russia	8:07.36	PB	2
12	Elmar Engholm	Sweden	8:34.40	PB	1

=== 5000 metres ===
Rank	Name	Nationality	Time	Notes	Points
1	Arne Gabius	Germany	13:55.89		12
2	Jesús España	Spain	13:56.00		11
3	Ali Kaya	Turkey	13:56.64		10
4	Yevgeniy Rybakov	Russia	13:57.54		9
5	Łukasz Parszczyński	Poland	13:58.29	SB	8
6	Luke Caldwell	Great Britain	13:59.25		7
7	Yassine Mandour	France	14:00.46		6
8	Tom Wiggers	Netherlands	14:01.04		5
9	Mikael Ekvall	Sweden	14:07.24		4
10	Jamel Chatbi	Italy	14:28.89	SB	3
11	Oleksandr Borysyuk	Ukraine	14:48.28		2
12	Lukáš Kourek	Czech Republic	14:52.83		1

=== 3000 metres steeplechase ===
Rank	Name	Nationality	Time	Notes	Points
1	Yoann Kowal	France	8:25.50	SB	12
2	Martin Grau	Germany	8:29.16		11
3	Nikolay Chavkin	Russia	8:30.61		10
4	Yuri Floriani	Italy	8:36.18		9
5	Luke Gunn	Great Britain	8:36.45		8
6	Vadym Slobodenyuk	Ukraine	8:37.12		7
7	Krystian Zalewski	Poland	8:37.55		6
8	Daniel Lundgren	Sweden	8:38.80	PB	5
9	Víctor García	Spain	8:40.40		4
10	Tarık Langat Akdağ	Turkey	8:44.60		3
11	Milan Kocourek	Czech Republic	8:47.62		2
12	Richard Douma	Netherlands	9:02.66	PB	1

=== 110 metres hurdles ===
Wind:
Heat 1: -1.1 m/s
Heat 2: +1.0 m/s

Rank	Heat	Lane	Name	Nationality	React	Time	Notes	Points
1	2	3	Sergey Shubenkov	Russia	0.164	13.20	SB	12
2	2	5	William Sharman	Great Britain	0.150	13.21	PB	11
3	2	4	Pascal Martinot-Lagarde	France	0.163	13.35		10
4	2	6	Matthias Bühler	Germany	0.167	13.67		9
5	1	5	Philip Nossmy	Sweden	0.155	13.78		8
6	2	1	Koen Smet	Netherlands	0.174	13.78		7
7	2	2	Dominik Bochenek	Poland	0.153	13.89		6
8	1	3	Francisco Javier López	Spain	0.153	13.91		5
9	1	4	Hassane Fofana	Italy	0.159	13.97		4
10	1	6	Artem Shamatryn	Ukraine	0.146	14.21	SB	3
11	1	1	Jan Ján	Czech Republic	0.150	14.23	PB	2
12	1	2	Mustafa Günes	Turkey	0.159	14.24	SB	1

=== 400 metres hurdles ===
Rank	Heat	Lane	Name	Nationality	React	Time	Notes	Points
1	2	5	Denis Kudryavtsev	Russia	0.158	49.38		12
2	2	6	Silvio Schirrmeister	Germany	0.178	49.80		11
3	2	4	Richard Yates	Great Britain	0.173	50.11		10
4	2	2	Yoan Décimus	France	0.187	50.50		9
5	1	5	Robert Bryliński	Poland	0.184	50.64	PB	8
6	2	3	Leonardo Capotosti	Italy	0.175	50.72		7
7	1	4	Denys Nechyporenko	Ukraine	0.240	51.55		6
8	1	6	Jesper Arts	Netherlands	0.164	51.58		5
9	2	7	Michal Brož	Czech Republic	0.188	51.75		4
10	1	3	Oliwer Åstrand	Sweden	0.170	52.60	PB	3
11	1	2	Diego Cabello	Spain	0.186	53.22		2
12	1	7	Mehmet Güzel	Turkey	0.279	53.64		1

=== 4 × 100 metres relay ===
Rank	Heat	Nationality	Name	Time	Note	Points
1	2	Great Britain	Richard Kilty, Harry Aikines-Aryeetey, James Ellington, Adam Gemili	38.51		12
2	2	Germany	Christian Blum, Sven Knipphals, Alexander Kosenkow, Julian Reus	38.88		11
3	1	Italy	Massimiliano Ferraro, Eseosa Desalu, Diego Marani, Delmas Obou	39.06		10
4	1	Netherlands	Giovanni Codrington, Churandy Martina, Wouter Brus, Hensley Paulina	39.12		9
5	2	Poland	Robert Kubaczyk, Artur Zaczek, Kamil Masztak, Karol Zalewski	39.15		8
6	1	Ukraine	Roman Kravtsov, Serhiy Smelyk, Vitaliy Korzh, Volodymyr Suprun	39.24		7
7	1	Sweden	Tom Kling-Baptiste, Stefan Tärnhuvud, Alexander Brorsson, Patrik Andersson	39.33		6
8	2	Russia	Aleksandr Brednev, Konstantin Petryashov, Maksim Polovinkin, Mikhail Idrisov	39.35		5
9	1	Spain	Eduard Viles, Sergio Ruiz, Adrià Burriel, Ángel David Rodríguez	39.85		4
10	2	Czech Republic	Jan Veleba, Lukáš Šťastný, Jan Jirka, Michal Desenský	39.96		3
11	1	Turkey	Aykut Ay, İzzet Safer, Fatih Aktaş, Ramil Guliyev	40.25		2
	1	France	Pierre Vincent, Ken Romain, Jeffrey John, Ben Bassaw	DQ		0

=== 4 × 400 metres relay ===
Rank	Heat	Nationality	Name	Time	Note	Points
1	2	Russia	Maksim Dyldin, Lev Mosin, Pavel Trenikhin, Vladimir Krasnov	3:02.68		12
2	2	France	Mame-Ibra Anne, Teddy Venel, Marc Macedot, Thomas Jordier	3:03.05		11
3	2	Germany	Miguel Rigau, Kamghe Gaba, David Gollnow, Thomas Schneider	3:03.18		10
4	2	Great Britain	Andrew Steele, Rory Evans, Rabah Yousif, Jarryd Dunn	3:03.44		9
5	2	Poland	Łukasz Krawczuk, Andrzej Jaros, Mateusz Fórmański, Rafał Omelko	3:03.93		8
6	1	Netherlands	Bjorn Blauwhof, Jürgen Wielart, Bram Peters, Terrence Agard	3:06.56		7
7	2	Ukraine	Oleksiy Pozdnyakov, Yevhen Hutsol, Dmytro Bikulov, Volodymyr Burakov	3:07.00		6
8	1	Spain	Mark Ujakpor, Samuel García, Lucas Bua, Julio Arenas	3:07.01		5
9	1	Turkey	Buğrahan Kocabeyoğlu, Halit Kılıç, Batuhan Altıntaş, Yavuz Can	3:08.25		4
10	1	Sweden	Felix François, Axel Bergrahm, Oliwer Åstrand, Erik Martinsson	3:10.12		3
	1	Italy	Davide Re, Isalbet Juarez, Lorenzo Valentini, Matteo Galvan	DQ		0
	1	Czech Republic	Patrik Šorm, Daniel Němeček, Michal Desenský, Jan Tesař	DQ		0

=== High jump ===
Rank	Name	Nationality	2.00	2.05	2.10	2.15	2.19	2.23	2.26	2.28	2.30	2.40	Mark	Notes	Points
1	Andriy Protsenko	Ukraine	–	–	–	o	o	o	o	x–	o	xx	2.30		12
2	Andrey Silnov	Russia	–	–	–	o	xo	o	o	o	xxx		2.28	=SB	11
3	Jaroslav Bába	Czech Republic	–	–	–	o	o	o	xo	xxx			2.26	SB	10
4	Marco Fassinotti	Italy	–	–	o	xo	o	xx–	x				2.19		9
5	Chris Baker	Great Britain	–	–	o	o	xo	xxx					2.19		7.5
5	Wojciech Theiner	Poland	–	–	o	o	xo	xxx					2.19		7.5
7	Florian Labourel	France	–	o	o	o	xxx						2.15		6
8	Emil Svensson	Sweden	–	o	o	xo	xxx						2.15	SB	5
9	Martin Günther	Germany	–	–	xo	xo	xx						2.15		4
10	Douwe Amels	Netherlands	–	o	o	xxo	xx						2.15		3
11	Serhat Birinci	Turkey	–	–	xo	xxx							2.10		2
12	Miguel Ángel Sancho	Spain	o	o	xxo	xx							2.10		1

=== Pole vault ===
Rank	Name	Nationality	4.82	5.02	5.22	5.42	5.52	5.62	5.72	Mark	Notes	Points
1	Renaud Lavillenie	France	–	–	–	–	–	o	xxx	5.62		12
2	Jan Kudlička	Czech Republic	–	–	–	xo	–	xo	xx	5.62		10.5
2	Aleksandr Gripich	Russia	–	o	o	xo	o	xo	xx	5.62		10.5
4	Tobias Scherbarth	Germany	–	–	o	xxo	o	xx		5.52		9
~~5~~	Rutger Koppelaar	Netherlands	–	–	o	o	xo	xxx		~~5.52~~	DQ (doping)	0
5	Piotr Lisek	Poland	–	–	o	xo	–	xxx		5.42		7
6	Didac Salas	Spain	–	o	o	xxx				5.22		6
7	Vladyslav Revenko	Ukraine	–	o	o	xx–	x			5.22		5
8	Giuseppe Gibilisco	Italy	–	–	xxo	–	xx			5.22		4
	Melker Svärd-Jakobsson	Sweden	–	–	xxx					NM		0
	Ümit Sungur	Turkey	xxx							NM		0
	Steven Lewis	Great Britain	–	–	–	–	xxx			NM		0

=== Long jump ===
Rank	Name	Nationality	#1	#2	#3	#4	Mark	Notes	Points
1	Christian Reif	Germany	7.57	7.74	8.13	7.99	8.13		12
2	Greg Rutherford	Great Britain	7.99	7.88	7.84	7.93	7.99		11
3	Eusebio Cáceres	Spain	7.74	7.97	7.79	7.87	7.97		10
4	Tomasz Jaszczuk	Poland	7.22	7.95	7.75	x	7.95		9
5	Michel Tornéus	Sweden	x	7.69	7.88		7.88		8
6	Pavel Shalin	Russia	x	7.79	7.65		7.79		7
7	Ignisious Gaisah	Netherlands	7.74	7.77	7.68		7.77		6
8	Radek Juška	Czech Republic	7.76	7.47	7.55		7.76		5
9	Salim Sdiri	France	7.72	7.72	7.57		7.72		4
10	Artem Shpytko	Ukraine	7.71	7.71	7.36		7.71		3
11	Alper Kulaksiz	Turkey	7.29	7.53	x		7.53		2
12	Stefano Tremigliozzi	Italy	7.03	x	7.24		7.24		1

=== Triple jump ===
Rank	Name	Nationality	#1	#2	#3	#4	Mark	Notes	Points
1	Aleksey Fyodorov	Russia	16.84	16.58	16.95	16.66	16.95	SB	12
2	Fabrizio Donato	Italy	16.80	16.82	x	16.75	16.82		11
3	Viktor Kuznetsov	Ukraine	16.28w	16.24	16.63	x	16.63	SB	10
4	Phillips Idowu	Great Britain	x	16.37	x	x	16.37		9
5	Adrian Świderski	Poland	16.25	x	15.92		16.25		8
6	Pablo Torrijos	Spain	15.84	15.93	16.16		16.16		7
7	Mathias Ström	Sweden	x	16.13	16.05		16.13	SB	6
8	Kevin Luron	France	15.85	15.62	x		15.85		5
9	Musa Tüzen	Turkey	x	15.85w	15.42		15.85		4
10	Andreas Pohle	Germany	15.81	15.80	x		15.81		3
11	Jiří Vondráček	Czech Republic	x	15.15	15.69		15.69	PB	2
12	Sander Hage	Netherlands	x	15.49	15.03		15.49	PB	1

=== Shot put ===
Rank	Name	Nationality	#1	#2	#3	#4	Mark	Notes	Points
1	David Storl	Germany	20.26	20.85	21.20	x	21.20		12
2	Tomasz Majewski	Poland	20.00	20.50	20.57	20.09	20.57		11
3	Aleksandr Lesnoy	Russia	19.88	19.97	20.21	20.24	20.24		10
4	Borja Vivas	Spain	19.69	x	19.79	20.00	20.00		9
5	Leif Arrhenius	Sweden	19.63	x	18.52		19.63		8
6	Tomáš Stanek	Czech Republic	x	19.52	x		19.52		7
7	Gaëtan Bucki	France	x	18.07	18.15		18.15		6
8	Zane Duquemin	Great Britain	17.77	17.94	17.82		17.94		5
9	Patrick Cronie	Netherlands	17.15	17.63	17.73		17.73		4
10	Hüseyin Atici	Turkey	17.61	17.37	16.99		17.61		3
11	Daniele Secci	Italy	17.32	x	x		17.32		2
12	Vladyslav Chernikov	Ukraine	16.21	15.91	16.25		16.25		1

=== Discus throw ===
Rank	Name	Nationality	#1	#2	#3	#4	Mark	Notes	Points
1	Robert Harting	Germany	66.72	67.42	65.82	65.52	67.42		12
2	Piotr Małachowski	Poland	63.75	65.35	x	63.06	65.35		11
3	Viktor Butenko	Russia	61.95	62.26	58.98	62.81	62.81		10
4	Erik Cadée	Netherlands	60.14	62.42	62.72	62.58	62.72		9
5	Mario Pestano	Spain	59.23	61.35	62.12		62.12		8
6	Jan Marcell	Czech Republic	61.63	61.91	58.70		61.91	SB	7
7	Hannes Kirchler	Italy	61.14	59.05	x		61.14		6
8	Brett Morse	Great Britain	59.21	60.01	58.46		60.01		5
9	Oleksiy Semenov	Ukraine	58.96	59.54	59.65		59.65		4
10	Ercüment Olgundeniz	Turkey	57.88	x	x		57.88		3
11	Daniel Ståhl	Sweden	x	57.24	57.12		57.24		2
12	Stéphane Marthely	France	x	54.62	x		54.62		1

=== Hammer throw ===
Rank	Name	Nationality	#1	#2	#3	#4	Mark	Notes	Points
1	Sergey Litvinov	Russia	73.78	75.33	76.34	75.62	76.34		12
~~2~~	Quentin Bigot	France	~~73.40~~	~~74.67~~	~~76.15~~	~~76.03~~	~~76.15~~	DQ (doping)	0
2	Paweł Fajdek	Poland	x	x	75.26	x	75.26		11
3	Markus Esser	Germany	74.73	74.90	x	x	74.90		10
4	Nick Miller	Great Britain	72.59	73.56	72.35		73.56		9
5	Markus Johansson	Sweden	69.68	72.70	72.30		72.70		8
6	Nicola Vizzoni	Italy	71.08	x	71.38		71.38		7
7	Yevhen Vynohradov	Ukraine	x	x	70.21		70.21		6
8	Özkan Baltaci	Turkey	67.73	67.93	69.79		69.79		5
9	Lukáš Melich	Czech Republic	69.01	69.33	x		69.33		4
10	Javier Cienfuegos	Spain	68.61	x	x		68.61		3
11	Danzel Comenentia	Netherlands	63.01	x	63.17		63.17	SB	2

=== Javelin throw ===
Rank	Name	Nationality	#1	#2	#3	#4	Mark	Notes	Points
1	Andreas Hofmann	Germany	86.13	x	75.39	77.40	86.13	PB	12
2	Dmitriy Tarabin	Russia	83.40	x	x	x	83.40		11
3	Maksym Bohdan	Ukraine	80.93	x	x	x	80.93		10
4	Norbert Bonvecchio	Italy	80.37	73.58	75.22	73.22	80.37	PB	9
5	Kim Amb	Sweden	80.14	x	76.57		80.14		8
6	Fatih Avan	Turkey	78.86	x	75.24		78.86		7
7	Łukasz Grzeszczuk	Poland	78.42	x	x		78.42		6
8	Petr Frydrych	Czech Republic	77.54	77.25	75.89		77.54		5
9	Lee Doran	Great Britain	x	67.58	71.29		71.29		4
10	Daan Meijer	Netherlands	71.25	70.03	68.66		71.25		3
11	Borja Barbeito	Spain	67.55	65.30	65.43		67.55		2
12	Killian Durechou	France	x	59.79	66.17		66.17		1

== Women ==
=== 100 metres ===
Wind:
Heat 1: -2.9 m/s
Heat 2: -0.9 m/s

Rank	Heat	Lane	Name	Nationality	React	Time	Notes	Points
1	2	3	Myriam Soumaré	France	0.149	11.35		12
2	2	5	Jamile Samuel	Netherlands	0.156	11.42		11
3	2	4	Verena Sailer	Germany	0.138	11.45		10
4	2	6	Hrystyna Stuy	Ukraine	0.155	11.51		9
5	2	2	Kateřina Čechová	Czech Republic	0.148	11.65		8
6	1	5	Rachel Johncock	Great Britain	0.151	11.77		7
7	1	1	Daniella Busk	Sweden	0.184	11.83		6
8	2	1	Audrey Alloh	Italy	0.153	11.86		5
9	1	3	Yekaterina Voronenkova	Russia	0.159	11.91		4
10	1	6	Weronika Wedler	Poland	0.151	11.96		3
11	1	4	Estela García	Spain	0.168	12.09		2
12	1	2	Nimet Karakuş	Turkey	0.184	12.88		1

=== 200 metres ===
Wind:
Heat 1: +1.3 m/s
Heat 2: +1.2 m/s

Rank	Heat	Lane	Name	Nationality	React	Time	Notes	Points
1	2	5	Dafne Schippers	Netherlands	0.157	22.74		12
2	2	6	Nataliya Pohrebnyak	Ukraine	0.172	23.13		11
3	2	2	Anyika Onuora	Great Britain	0.172	23.24		10
4	2	4	Jennifer Galais	France	0.174	23.35		9
5	2	7	Irene Ekelund	Sweden	0.213	23.55		8
6	1	4	Rebekka Haase	Germany	0.179	23.64		7
7	2	3	Yelizaveta Savlinis	Russia	0.186	23.86		6
8	1	3	Weronika Wedler	Poland	0.163	24.03		5
9	1	7	Denisa Rosolová	Czech Republic	0.198	24.04	SB	4
10	1	5	Irene Siragusa	Italy	0.150	24.08		3
11	1	6	Estela García	Spain	0.200	24.40		2
12	1	2	Sibel Ağan	Turkey	0.164	25.99	SB	1

=== 400 metres ===
Rank	Heat	Lane	Name	Nationality	React	Time	Notes	Points
1	2	6	Alena Tamkova	Russia	0.188	51.72		12
2	2	2	Esther Cremer	Germany	0.142	52.23		11
3	2	4	Olha Zemlyak	Ukraine	0.183	52.28		10
4	2	7	Libania Grenot	Italy	0.167	52.46		9
5	2	5	Floria Gueï	France	0.217	52.58		8
6	1	4	Aauri Lorena Bokesa	Spain	0.177	52.71		7
7	2	3	Shana Cox	Great Britain	0.193	52.91		6
8	1	5	Madiea Ghafoor	Netherlands	0.198	53.04		5
9	1	6	Justyna Święty	Poland	0.201	53.32		4
10	1	7	Lenka Masná	Czech Republic	0.175	54.32		3
11	1	3	Josefin Magnusson	Sweden	0.180	54.42		2
12	1	2	Birsen Engin	Turkey	0.187	56.84	SB	1

=== 800 metres ===
Rank	Name	Nationality	Time	Notes	Points
1	Yekaterina Poistogova	Russia	2:02.65		12
2	Rénelle Lamote	France	2:03.36		11
3	Olha Lyakhova	Ukraine	2:03.39		10
4	Fabienne Kohlmann	Germany	2:03.51		9
5	Khadija Rahmouni	Spain	2:03.69		8
6	Angelika Cichocka	Poland	2:03.70		7
7	Jenny Meadows	Great Britain	2:03.97		6
8	Lenka Masná	Czech Republic	2:04.13		5
9	Lovisa Lindh	Sweden	2:04.19	SB	4
10	Marta Milani	Italy	2:04.54		3
11	Sanne Verstegen	Netherlands	2:05.20		2
12	Tuğba Koyuncu	Turkey	2:11.87		1

=== 1500 metres ===
Rank	Name	Nationality	Time	Notes	Points
1	Abeba Aregawi	Sweden	4:14.20		12
2	Anna Shchagina	Russia	4:15.04		11
3	Nataliya Pryshchepa	Ukraine	4:15.71		10
4	Federica Del Buono	Italy	4:16.01		9
5	Hannah England	Great Britain	4:16.88		8
6	Danuta Urbanik	Poland	4:17.24		7
7	Maureen Koster	Netherlands	4:17.95		6
8	Diana Mezuliáníková	Czech Republic	4:18.47		5
9	Isabel Macías	Spain	4:18.54	SB	4
10	Justine Fedronic	France	4:19.10	SB	3
11	Elina Sujew	Germany	4:20.27		2
12	Özlem Kaya	Turkey	4:22.35	PB	1

=== 3000 metres ===
Rank	Name	Nationality	Time	Notes	Points
1	Sifan Hassan	Netherlands	8:45.24	CR	12
2	Yelena Korobkina	Russia	8:51.00	PB	11
3	Nuria Fernández	Spain	8:51.54		10
4	Kristiina Mäki	Czech Republic	8:51.69	NR	9
5	Margherita Magnani	Italy	8:51.82	PB	8
6	Renata Pliś	Poland	8:52.55		7
7	Clémence Calvin	France	8:54.29		6
8	Diana Sujew	Germany	8:54.50		5
9	Kate Avery	Great Britain	8:56.24	PB	4
10	Esma Aydemir	Turkey	9:20.77		3
11	Linn Nilsson	Sweden	9:22.34	PB	2
~~12~~	Svitlana Shmidt	Ukraine	~~9:38.44~~	DQ (doping)	0

=== 5000 metres ===
Rank	Name	Nationality	Time	Notes	Points
1	Meraf Bahta	Sweden	15:36.36		12
~~2~~	Gamze Bulut	Turkey	~~15:37.70~~	~~PB~~, DQ (doping)	0
2	Giulia Viola	Italy	15:40.30	PB	10
3	Jip Vastenburg	Netherlands	15:40.74		9
4	Beth Potter	Great Britain	15:42.22		8
5	Alla Kulyatina	Russia	15:42.80		7
6	Laila Traby	France	15:48.23	PB	6
7	Karolina Jarzyńska	Poland	15:49.40		5
8	Dolores Checa	Spain	15:51.99		4
9	Sabrina Mockenhaupt	Germany	15:58.47		3
10	Lucie Sekanová	Czech Republic	16:23.77		2
11	Mariya Hodakyvska	Ukraine	17:02.51		1

=== 3000 metres steeplechase ===
Rank	Name	Nationality	Time	Notes	Points
1	Charlotta Fougberg	Sweden	9:35.92		12
2	Antje Möldner-Schmidt	Germany	9:40.21		11
3	Katarzyna Kowalska	Poland	9:41.78		10
4	Diana Martín	Spain	9:42.18	SB	9
5	Yekaterina Doseykina	Russia	9:42.61		8
6	Claire Perraux	France	9:49.64	SB	7
7	Lennie Waite	Great Britain	9:52.45		6
8	Özlem Kaya	Turkey	9:58.97		5
9	Valeria Roffino	Italy	10:02.56	PB	4
10	Oksana Rayta	Ukraine	10:28.43		3
11	Tereza Novotná	Czech Republic	11:12.37		2
12	Jolanda Verstraten	Netherlands	11:19.97		1

=== 100 metres hurdles ===
Wind:
Heat 1: -0.4 m/s
Heat 2: +1.8 m/s

Rank	Heat	Lane	Name	Nationality	React	Time	Notes	Points
1	2	3	Cindy Billaud	France	0.167	12.66	SB	12
2	2	5	Nadine Hildebrand	Germany	0.166	12.80	PB	11
3	2	2	Yuliya Kondakova	Russia	0.150	12.86	SB	10
4	2	4	Hanna Platitsyna	Ukraine	0.170	12.93	PB	9
5	2	1	Sharona Bakker	Netherlands	0.146	12.95	PB	8
6	1	3	Karolina Kołeczek	Poland	0.150	13.13	=PB	7
7	1	4	Marzia Caravelli	Italy	0.156	13.13		6
8	1	5	Serita Solomon	Great Britain	0.172	13.22	SB	5
9	2	6	Lucie Škrobáková	Czech Republic	0.187	13.33		4
10	1	1	Elin Westerlund	Sweden	0.155	13.60		3
11	1	2	Teresa Errandonea	Spain	0.137	13.67	PB	2
12	1	6	Sema Apak	Turkey	0.152	14.25	SB	1

=== 400 metres hurdles ===
Rank	Heat	Lane	Name	Nationality	React	Time	Notes	Points
1	2	4	Hanna Ryzhykova	Ukraine	0.172	55.00	SB	12
2	2	6	Eilidh Child	Great Britain	0.171	55.36		11
3	2	5	Irina Davydova	Russia	0.220	55.79		10
4	2	7	Denisa Rosolová	Czech Republic	0.206	56.10		9
5	2	3	Christiane Klopsch	Germany	0.198	56.38		8
6	1	6	Joanna Linkiewicz	Poland	0.185	56.62		7
7	2	2	Yadisleidy Pedroso	Italy	0.201	56.70		6
8	1	5	Laura Sotomayor	Spain	0.171	57.32		5
9	1	4	Phara Anarchasis	France	0.210	58.22		4
10	1	2	Frida Persson	Sweden	0.168	58.82		3
11	1	7	Emel Sanli	Turkey	0.190	59.79		2
12	1	3	Graciella Woutersen	Netherlands	0.339	59.98	PB	1

=== 4 × 100 metres relay ===
Rank	Heat	Nationality	Name	Time	Note	Points
1	1	Netherlands	Naomi Sedney, Dafne Schippers, Tessa van Schagen, Jamile Samuel	42.95		12
2	2	France	Céline Distel-Bonnet, Ayodelé Ikuesan, Jennifer Galais, Stella Akakpo	43.19		11
3	2	Russia	Marina Panteleyeva, Natalya Rusakova, Yelizaveta Savlinis, Yuliya Chermoshanskaya	43.45		10
4	2	Ukraine	Nataliya Strohova, Nataliya Pohrebnyak, Hrystyna Stuy, Hanna Platitsyna	43.49		9
5	2	Great Britain	Jodie Williams, Anyika Onuora, Hayley Jones, Louise Bloor	43.66		8
6	2	Germany	Yasmin Kwadwo, Rebekka Haase, Tatjana Pinto, Verena Sailer	43.78		7
7	2	Poland	Anna Kiełbasińska, Weronika Wedler, Marta Jeschke, Ewelina Ptak	43.97		6
8	1	Italy	Jessica Paoletta, Irene Siragusa, Martina Amidei, Audrey Alloh	44.13		5
9	1	Czech Republic	Petra Urbánková, Jana Slaninová, Martina Schmidová, Kateřina Čechová	44.63		4
10	1	Sweden	Irene Ekelund, Linnea Killander, Daniella Busk, Pernilla Nilsson	44.66		3
11	1	Turkey	Yudum Iliksiz, Sibel Ağan, Gizem Demirel, Birsen Engin	47.93		2
	1	Spain	María Isabel Pérez, Fatima Diame, Estela García, Cristina Lara	DQ		0

=== 4 × 400 metres relay ===
Rank	Heat	Nationality	Name	Time	Note	Points
1	2	Ukraine	Darya Prystupa, Hanna Ryzhykova, Hrystyna Stuy, Olha Zemlyak	3:27.66		12
2	2	Germany	Esther Cremer, Lena Schmidt, Lara Hoffmann, Ruth Sophia Spelmeyer	3:28.34		11
3	2	France	Elea-Mariama Diarra, Agnès Raharolahy, Estelle Perrossier, Floria Gueï	3:28.35		10
4	2	Great Britain	Laura Wake, Emily Diamond, Seren Bundy-Davies, Jodie Williams	3:28.91		9
5	2	Poland	Agata Bednarek, Małgorzata Hołub, Justyna Święty, Patrycja Wyciszkiewicz	3:29.02		8
6	1	Italy	Chiara Bazzoni, Maria Enrica Spacca, Elena Bonfanti, Libania Grenot	3:30.17		7
7	2	Russia	Mariya Mikhailyuk, Yekaterina Renzhina, Irina Davydova, Olga Tovarnova	3:30.36		6
8	1	Netherlands	Marit Dopheide, Anna Voskamp, Nicky van Leuveren, Madiea Ghafoor	3:32.84		5
9	1	Czech Republic	Denisa Rosolová, Helena Jiranová, Zdeňka Seidlová, Lenka Masná	3:35.38		4
10	2	Sweden	Elin Moraiti, Josefin Magnusson, Lovisa Lindh, Sofia Hellberg-Jonsén	3:38.21		3
~~11~~	1	Turkey	Emel Şanlı, Birsen Engin, Nihan Karuk, Meliz Redif	~~3:46.17~~	DQ (doping)	0
	1	Spain	Indira Terrero, Aauri Lorena Bokesa, Begoña Garrido, Natalia Romero	DQ		0

=== High jump ===
Rank	Name	Nationality	1.70	1.75	1.79	1.83	1.87	1.90	1.93	1.95	1.97	2.00	Mark	Notes	Points
1	Mariya Kuchina	Russia	–	–	o	o	o	o	xo	xo	–	xx	1.95		12
2	Oksana Okuneva	Ukraine	–	–	o	o	xo	o	o	xxo	x		1.95		11
3	Ruth Beitia	Spain	–	–	o	o	o	xo	xxx				1.90		10.5
3	Kamila Lićwinko	Poland	–	–	o	o	o	xo	xxx				1.90		10.5
5	Marie-Laurence Jungfleisch	Germany	–	o	o	o	o	xxx					1.87		8
6	Michaela Hrubá	Czech Republic	xo	o	o	xxo	o	x					1.87	=PB	7
7	Sietske Noorman	Netherlands	o	o	o	o	xxx						1.83		5.5
7	Burcu Yüksel	Turkey	–	o	o	o	xxx						1.83		5.5
9	Erika Furlani	Italy	o	o	xo	o	xxx						1.83		4
10	My Nordström	Sweden	–	o	xo	xo	xx						1.83	SB	3
11	Isobel Pooley	Great Britain	–	–	o	xxo	xx						1.83		2
12	Dior Delophont	France	o	o	o	xxx							1.79		1

=== Pole vault ===
Rank	Name	Nationality	3.60	3.80	4.00	4.15	4.25	4.35	4.40	4.45	4.50	4.55	4.60	4.65	4.70	Mark	Notes	Points
1	Anzhelika Sidorova	Russia	–	–	–	–	–	o	–	xo	–	o	xo	o	x	4.65	=EL	12
2	Jiřina Svobodová	Czech Republic	–	–	–	–	–	o	–	o	–	xo	o	xxx		4.60	SB	11
3	Katharina Bauer	Germany	–	–	–	–	o	xo	o	xxx						4.40		10
4	Marion Fiack	France	–	–	–	o	o	o	xxx							4.35		9
5	Naroa Agirre	Spain	–	o	o	o	xo	xxx								4.25		8
6	Michaela Meijer	Sweden	–	–	o	xo	xo	xx								4.25	SB	7
7	Rianna Galiart	Netherlands	–	o	o	xo	xxx									4.15	SB	5.5
7	Sonia Malavisi	Italy	–	–	o	xo	xxx									4.15		5.5
9	Lucy Bryan	Great Britain	–	–	o	–	xxx									4.00		3
10	Demet Parlak	Turkey	o	xxx												3.60		2
	Kateryna Kozlova	Ukraine	–	–	xxx											NM		0
	Anna Rogowska	Poland	–	–	–	–	–	–	xxx							NM		0

=== Long jump ===
Rank	Name	Nationality	#1	#2	#3	#4	Mark	Notes	Points
1	Malaika Mihambo	Germany	6.90	6.71	6.90w	6.53	6.90	PB	12
2	Éloyse Lesueur	France	6.48	6.87w	x	6.68	6.87w		11
3	Erica Jarder	Sweden	6.65	6.67	x	6.26	6.67	PB	10
4	Tania Vicenzino	Italy	6.51	6.19	6.42w	x	6.51		9
5	María del Mar Jover	Spain	6.45	5.77	x		6.45		8
~~6~~	Olga Kucherenko	Russia	~~6.43w~~	~~6.43~~	~~x~~		~~6.43~~	DQ (doping)	0
6	Anna Kornuta	Ukraine	5.84	6.31	x		6.31		7
7	Teresa Dobija	Poland	6.30w	x	6.18		6.30w		6
8	Jazmin Sawyers	Great Britain	6.10	x	6.27		6.27		5
9	Nadine Visser	Netherlands	6.02	6.23w	6.04		6.23w		4
10	Büsra Mutay	Turkey	6.15	5.85	5.88		6.15		3
11	Jana Korešová	Czech Republic	5.94	6.06	x		6.06		2

=== Triple jump ===
Rank	Name	Nationality	#1	#2	#3	#4	Mark	Notes	Points
1	Yekaterina Koneva	Russia	13.77	14.55	14.29	14.20	14.55		12
2	Olha Saladukha	Ukraine	x	x	14.33	14.17	14.33	SB	11
3	Jenny Elbe	Germany	13.64	x	14.01	13.69	14.01		10
4	Anna Jagaciak	Poland	13.67	13.95	13.86	13.90	13.95		9
5	Angelica Ström	Sweden	x	x	13.43		13.43	PB	8
6	Lucie Májková	Czech Republic	13.18	13.34	13.29		13.34		7
7	Yamilé Aldama	Great Britain	12.94	x	13.31		13.31		6
8	Jeanine Assani Issouf	France	13.21	13.21	13.28		13.28		5
9	Ana Peleteiro	Spain	13.09	x	13.02		13.09		4
10	Simona La Mantia	Italy	12.94	x	13.06		13.06		3
11	Sevin Sinmez Serbest	Turkey	12.86	x	12.83		12.86		2
12	Nora Ritzen	Netherlands	12.02	12.06	12.58		12.58		1

=== Shot put ===
Rank	Name	Nationality	#1	#2	#3	#4	Mark	Notes	Points
1	Christina Schwanitz	Germany	x	19.43	18.87	18.87	19.43		12
2	Irina Tarasova	Russia	17.99	18.05	18.36	x	18.36		11
3	Chiara Rosa	Italy	17.92	17.51	17.60	17.91	17.92	SB	10
4	Olha Holodna	Ukraine	16.79	17.66	17.39	17.73	17.73		9
5	Jessica Cérival	France	16.68	17.33	16.83		17.33	SB	8
6	Úrsula Ruiz	Spain	16.78	x	16.84		16.84		7
7	Melissa Boekelman	Netherlands	16.63	16.79	16.42		16.79		6
8	Emel Dereli	Turkey	16.32	x	16.41		16.41		5
9	Agnieszka Maluśkiewicz	Poland	x	16.28	16.09		16.28		4
10	Fanny Roos	Sweden	14.15	14.78	15.68		15.68		3
11	Jana Kárníková	Czech Republic	15.63	x	15.41		15.63		2
12	Rachel Wallader	Great Britain	15.26	x	15.56		15.56		1

=== Discus throw ===
Rank	Name	Nationality	#1	#2	#3	#4	Mark	Notes	Points
1	Mélina Robert-Michon	France	x	65.51	61.71	63.65	65.51	SB	12
2	Shanice Craft	Germany	65.07	64.64	61.18	62.56	65.07		11
3	Yekaterina Strokova	Russia	61.06	62.87	59.70	63.97	63.97		10
4	Żaneta Glanc	Poland	55.77	58.80	60.18	59.12	60.18		9
5	Nataliya Semenova	Ukraine	x	56.12	59.14		59.14		8
6	Sabina Asenjo	Spain	54.94	56.54	x		56.54		7
7	Eliška Staňková	Czech Republic	50.85	x	55.43		55.43		6
8	Jade Lally	Great Britain	51.84	x	53.71		53.71		5
9	Sofia Larsson	Sweden	x	x	51.62		51.62		4
10	Valentina Aniballi	Italy	x	x	50.91		50.91		3
11	Elçin Kaya	Turkey	47.51	50.10	x		50.10		2
12	Corinne Nugter	Netherlands	48.76	46.90	47.82		48.76		1

=== Hammer throw ===
Rank	Name	Nationality	#1	#2	#3	#4	Mark	Notes	Points
1	Betty Heidler	Germany	72.22	73.80	74.63	73.94	74.63		12
2	Joanna Fiodorow	Poland	71.89	72.23	71.64	71.96	72.23		11
~~3~~	Anna Bulgakova	Russia	~~x~~	~~69.83~~	~~x~~	~~71.83~~	~~71.83~~	DQ (doping)	0
3	Sophie Hitchon	Great Britain	68.93	x	69.23	x	69.23		10
4	Silvia Salis	Italy	65.29	67.82	67.98		67.98		9
5	Tracey Andersson	Sweden	65.65	67.88	67.30		67.88		8
6	Berta Castells	Spain	62.62	63.45	66.71		66.71		7
7	Alexandra Tavernier	France	x	66.01	x		66.01		6
8	Tereza Králová	Czech Republic	63.81	65.41	x		65.41		5
9	Iryna Novozhylova	Ukraine	64.59	x	x		64.59		4
10	Wendy Koolhaas	Netherlands	57.54	58.43	58.28		58.43		3
11	Zeliha Uzunbilek	Turkey	x	50.74	52.10		52.10		2

=== Javelin throw ===
Rank	Name	Nationality	#1	#2	#3	#4	Mark	Notes	Points
1	Barbora Špotáková	Czech Republic	62.26	63.27	x	65.57	65.57		12
2	Hanna Hatsko-Fedusova	Ukraine	57.75	x	63.01	61.04	63.01		11
3	Linda Stahl	Germany	61.58	57.02	59.42	55.56	61.58		10
4	Viktoriya Sudarushkina	Russia	59.40	58.69	55.54	56.25	59.40		9
5	Sofi Flinck	Sweden	51.31	56.51	55.34		56.51		8
6	Mercedes Chilla	Spain	53.02	53.51	56.03		56.03	SB	7
7	Izzy Jeffs	Great Britain	52.63	x	x		52.63		6
8	Barbara Madejczyk	Poland	52.32	52.04	49.94		52.32		5
9	Sara Jemai	Italy	50.22	48.88	52.06		52.06		4
10	Lisanne Schol	Netherlands	51.84	x	x		51.84		3
11	Berivan Şakir	Turkey	48.83	50.18	49.34		50.18		2
12	Alexie Alaïs	France	47.40	46.15	x		47.40		1
