= 2007 European Athletics U23 Championships – Men's 200 metres =

The men's 200 metres event at the 2007 European Athletics U23 Championships was held at the Gyulai István Atlétikai Stadion in Debrecen, Hungary between 13–14 July 2007.

== Medalists ==
Gold	Visa Hongisto; Finland
Silver	Vojtěch Šulc; Czech Republic
Bronze	Rikki Fifton; United Kingdom

== Results ==
=== Final ===
14 July
Wind: -1.9 m/s

Rank	Name	Nationality	Time	Notes
1st place, gold medalist(s)	Visa Hongisto	Finland	20.84	
2nd place, silver medalist(s)	Vojtěch Šulc	Czech Republic	20.91	
3rd place, bronze medalist(s)	Rikki Fifton	United Kingdom	21.02	
4	Daniel Schnelting	Germany	21.04	
5	Marco Cribari	Switzerland	21.08	
6	Leon Baptiste	United Kingdom	21.08	
7	Igor Bodrov	Ukraine	21.18	
8	Jan Schiller	Czech Republic	21.46	

=== Semifinals ===
14 July
Qualified: first 4 in each heat to the Final

==== Semifinal 1 ====
Wind: -0.4 m/s

Rank	Name	Nationality	Time	Notes
1	Visa Hongisto	Finland	20.88	Q
2	Rikki Fifton	United Kingdom	20.93	Q
3	Igor Bodrov	Ukraine	20.97	Q
4	Jan Schiller	Czech Republic	21.00	Q
5	Miklós Szebeny	Hungary	21.08	
6	Mateusz Pluta	Poland	21.25	
7	Marek Niit	Estonia	27.46	
	Jerrel Feller	Netherlands	DNF	

==== Semifinal 2 ====
Wind: -0.2 m/s

Rank	Name	Nationality	Time	Notes
1	Vojtěch Šulc	Czech Republic	20.92	Q
2	Daniel Schnelting	Germany	20.96	Q
3	Marco Cribari	Switzerland	20.97	Q
4	Leon Baptiste	United Kingdom	21.10	Q
5	Ruslan Abbasov	Azerbaijan	21.13	
5	Arnaldo Abrantes	Portugal	21.13	
7	Jeffrey Lawal-Balogun	United Kingdom	21.31	
8	Krzysztof Jabłoński	Poland	21.31	

=== Heats ===
13 July
Qualified: first 2 in each heat and 6 best to the Semifinals

==== Heat 1 ====
Wind: -0.4 m/s

Rank	Name	Nationality	Time	Notes
1	Rikki Fifton	United Kingdom	21.00	Q
2	Vojtěch Šulc	Czech Republic	21.05	Q
3	Ruslan Abbasov	Azerbaijan	21.36	q
4	Marek Niit	Estonia	21.47	q
5	Yordan Ilinov	Bulgaria	21.48	
6	Péter Miklós	Hungary	21.70	
7	Benjamin Grill	Austria	21.80	

==== Heat 2 ====
Wind: -0.9 m/s

Rank	Name	Nationality	Time	Notes
1	Visa Hongisto	Finland	20.75	Q
2	Marco Cribari	Switzerland	20.91	Q
3	Arnaldo Abrantes	Portugal	20.97	q
4	Miklós Szebeny	Hungary	21.24	q
5	Mateusz Pluta	Poland	21.26	q
6	Dmytro Ostrovskyy	Ukraine	21.55	
7	Gregor Kokalovič	Slovenia	21.56	

==== Heat 3 ====
Wind: -0.8 m/s

Rank	Name	Nationality	Time	Notes
1	Leon Baptiste	United Kingdom	21.15	Q
2	Igor Bodrov	Ukraine	21.24	Q
3	Krzysztof Jabłoński	Poland	21.39	q
4	Nils Müller	Germany	21.48	
5	Vasile Boboș	Romania	21.55	
6	Andreas Paphitis	Cyprus	22.47	
	Alexander Trambich	Israel	DNS	

==== Heat 4 ====
Wind: -1.2 m/s

Rank	Name	Nationality	Time	Notes
1	Jerrel Feller	Netherlands	21.25	Q
2	Jeffrey Lawal-Balogun	United Kingdom	21.51	Q
3	Christian Settemsli Mogstad	Norway	21.59	
4	Jonathan Åstrand	Finland	21.65	
5	Veselin Pankov	Bulgaria	22.04	
	Christian Blum	Germany	DNF	

==== Heat 5 ====
Wind: -0.5 m/s

Rank	Name	Nationality	Time	Notes
1	Daniel Schnelting	Germany	21.19	Q
2	Jan Schiller	Czech Republic	21.31	Q
3	Yeoryios Koutsotheodorou	Greece	21.48	
4	Nicklas Hyde	Denmark	21.51	
	Dariusz Kuć	Poland	DNF	
	Matija Čop	Croatia	DNS	

== Participation ==
According to an unofficial count, 31 athletes from 20 countries participated in the event.

- Austria (1)
- Azerbaijan (1)
- Bulgaria (2)
- Cyprus (1)
- Czech Republic (2)
- Denmark (1)
- Estonia (1)
- Finland (2)
- Germany (3)
- Greece (1)
- Hungary (2)
- Netherlands (1)
- Norway (1)
- Poland (3)
- Portugal (1)
- Romania (1)
- Slovenia (1)
- Switzerland (1)
- Ukraine (2)
- United Kingdom (3)
