= 2007 European Athletics Indoor Championships – Men's 60 metres =

The Men's 60 metres event at the 2007 European Athletics Indoor Championships was held on March 3–4.

== Medalists ==
Gold	Silver	Bronze
Jason Gardener; Great Britain	Craig Pickering; Great Britain	Ronald Pognon; France

== Results ==
=== Heats ===
First 3 of each heat (Q) and the next 4 fastest (q) qualified for the semifinals.

Rank	Heat	Name	Nationality	Time	Notes
1	3	Jason Gardener	Great Britain	6.59	Q
2	1	Craig Pickering	Great Britain	6.61	Q
3	1	Paul Hession	Ireland	6.61	Q, NR
4	4	Christian Blum	Germany	6.64	Q
5	1	Timo Salonen	Finland	6.65	Q, PB
5	2	Ronald Pognon	France	6.65	Q
5	3	Jarkko Ruostekivi	Finland	6.65	Q
5	4	Mikhail Yegorychev	Russia	6.65	Q
5	4	Fabio Cerutti	Italy	6.65	Q
10	2	Ryan Scott	Great Britain	6.67	Q
11	1	Ronny Ostwald	Germany	6.68	q
12	4	Ángel David Rodríguez	Spain	6.70	q
13	3	Matic Osovnikar	Slovenia	6.71	Q
14	1	Martin Rypdal	Norway	6.74	q
14	2	Massimiliano Donati	Italy	6.74	Q
14	4	Martial Mbandjock	France	6.74	q
17	3	Łukasz Chyła	Poland	6.75	
18	2	Nghi Tran	Finland	6.78	
18	3	Gergely Németh	Hungary	6.78	
20	4	Miklós Szebeny	Hungary	6.79	
21	2	Andreas Baumann	Switzerland	6.80	
22	1	Igor Gostev	Russia	6.81	
22	2	Iván Mocholí	Spain	6.81	
24	3	Marek Niit	Estonia	6.87	
25	2	Henrik Johnsen	Norway	6.88	
26	1	Darren Gilford	Malta	6.92	SB
27	3	Sébastien Gattuso	Monaco	7.01	NR
28	3	Dominic Carroll	Gibraltar	7.41	PB
	1	Daryl Vassallo	Gibraltar	DQ	
	4	Stanislav Olijar	Latvia	DNS	

=== Semifinals ===
First 4 of each semifinals qualified directly (Q) for the final.

Rank	Heat	Name	Nationality	Time	Notes
1	1	Jason Gardener	Great Britain	6.58	Q
1	2	Craig Pickering	Great Britain	6.58	Q
3	1	Ronald Pognon	France	6.59	Q
4	2	Fabio Cerutti	Italy	6.62	Q, PB
5	1	Ryan Scott	Great Britain	6.63	Q, SB
6	1	Paul Hession	Ireland	6.64	Q
7	2	Matic Osovnikar	Slovenia	6.65	Q
8	2	Mikhail Yegorychev	Russia	6.66	Q
9	2	Christian Blum	Germany	6.66	
10	1	Ronny Ostwald	Germany	6.67	
11	2	Jarkko Ruostekivi	Finland	6.68	
12	1	Timo Salonen	Finland	6.70	
12	2	Ángel David Rodríguez	Spain	6.70	
14	1	Massimiliano Donati	Italy	6.72	
15	2	Martial Mbandjock	France	6.75	
16	1	Martin Rypdal	Norway	6.79	

=== Final ===
Rank	Lane	Name	Nationality	Time	Notes
1st place, gold medalist(s)	3	Jason Gardener	Great Britain	6.51	SB
2nd place, silver medalist(s)	5	Craig Pickering	Great Britain	6.59	
3rd place, bronze medalist(s)	6	Ronald Pognon	France	6.60	
4	2	Matic Osovnikar	Slovenia	6.63	SB
5	8	Mikhail Yegorychev	Russia	6.65	
6	4	Fabio Cerutti	Italy	6.65	
7	1	Paul Hession	Ireland	6.68	
	7	Ryan Scott	Great Britain	DQ	
