= 2014 European Athletics Championships – Men's 4 × 100 metres relay =

Men's 4 × 100 metres relay at the European Athletics Championships

The men's 4 × 100 metres relay at the 2014 European Athletics Championships took place at the Letzigrund on 16 and 17 August.

== Medalists ==
Gold	James Ellington, Harry Aikines-Aryeetey, Richard Kilty, Adam Gemili, Daniel Talbot; Great Britain
Silver	Julian Reus, Sven Knipphals, Alexander Kosenkow, Lucas Jakubczyk; Germany
Bronze	Pierre Vincent, Christophe Lemaitre, Teddy Tinmar, Ben Bassaw; France

== Records ==
Standing records prior to the 2014 European Athletics Championships
World record	Jamaica; Nesta Carter, Michael Frater; Yohan Blake, Usain Bolt	36.84	London, Great Britain	11 August 2012
European record	Great Britain; Jason Gardener, Darren Campbell; Marlon Devonish, Dwain Chambers	37.73	Seville, Spain	29 August 1999
Championship record	France; Max Moriniere, Daniel Sangouma; Jean-Charles Trouabal, Bruno Marie-Rose	37.79	Split, Yugoslavia	1 September 1990
World Leading	Jamaica; Jason Livermore, Kemar Bailey-Cole; Nickel Ashmeade, Usain Bolt	37.58	Glasgow, Great Britain	2 August 2014
European Leading	Great Britain; Richard Kilty, Harry Aikines-Aryeetey; James Ellington, Daniel Talbot	37.93	Nassau, Bahamas	25 May 2014

== Schedule ==
Date	Time	Round
16 August 2014	15:35	Round 1
17 August 2014	17:05	Final

All times are local times (UTC+2)

== Results ==
=== Round 1 ===
First 3 in each heat (Q) and 2 best performers (q) advance to the Final.

Rank	Heat	Lane	Nation	Athletes	Time	Notes
1	2	5	Germany	Julian Reus, Sven Knipphals, Alexander Kosenkow, Lucas Jakubczyk	38.15	Q, SB
2	1	4	Great Britain	James Ellington, Harry Aikines-Aryeetey, Richard Kilty, Daniel Talbot	38.26	Q
3	1	5	Switzerland	Pascal Mancini, Reto Schenkel, Suganthan Somasundaram, Alex Wilson	38.54	Q, NR
4	2	4	France	Pierre Vincent, Christophe Lemaitre, Teddy Tinmar, Ben Bassaw	38.55	Q
5	2	7	Italy	Fabio Cerutti, Eseosa Desalu, Diego Marani, Delmas Obou	38.71	Q, SB
6	2	2	Poland	Robert Kubaczyk, Dariusz Kuć, Kamil Masztak, Karol Zalewski	38.75	q
7	2	1	Portugal	Diogo Antunes, Francis Obikwelu, Arnaldo Abrantes, Yazaldes Nascimento	38.79	q, NR
8	1	8	Netherlands	Giovanni Codrington, Churandy Martina, Hensley Paulina, Wouter Brus	38.90	Q
9	1	1	Ukraine	Roman Kravtsov, Serhiy Smelyk, Vitaliy Korzh, Emil Ibrahimov	39.03	
10	1	7	Sweden	Tom Kling-Baptiste, Stefan Tärnhuvud, Alexander Brorsson, Erik Hagberg	39.27	SB
11	1	6	Finland	Eetu Rantala, Ville Myllymäki, Jonathan Åstrand, Hannu Hämäläinen	39.47	SB
12	1	3	Estonia	Mart Muru, Rait Veesalu, Markus Ellisaar, Marek Niit	39.52	NR
13	2	3	Romania	Stefan Alexandru Codreanu, Doru Teofilescu, Alexandru Terpezan, Catalin Cîmpeanu	39.67	SB
14	1	2	Turkey	Umutcan Emektas, İzzet Safer, Aykut Ay, Ramil Guliyev	39.83	SB
15	2	8	Lithuania	Žilvinas Adomavičius, Kostas Skrabulis, Ugnius Savickas, Rytis Sakalauskas	40.15	
	2	6	Spain	Eduard Viles, Sergio Ruíz, Iván Jesús Ramos, Adrià Burriel	DNF	

=== Final ===
Rank	Lane	Nation	Athletes	Time	Notes
1st place, gold medalist(s)	3	Great Britain	James Ellington, Harry Aikines-Aryeetey, Richard Kilty, Adam Gemili	37.93	EL
2nd place, silver medalist(s)	4	Germany	Julian Reus, Sven Knipphals, Alexander Kosenkow, Lucas Jakubczyk	38.09	SB
3rd place, bronze medalist(s)	6	France	Pierre Vincent, Christophe Lemaitre, Teddy Tinmar, Ben Bassaw	38.47	
4	5	Switzerland	Pascal Mancini, Reto Schenkel, Suganthan Somasundaram, Alex Wilson	38.56	
5	8	Netherlands	Giovanni Codrington, Churandy Martina, Hensley Paulina, Wouter Brus	38.60	
6	1	Poland	Adam Pawłowski, Dariusz Kuć, Robert Kubaczyk, Karol Zalewski	38.85	
	7	Italy	Fabio Cerutti, Eseosa Desalu, Diego Marani, Delmas Obou	DNF	
	2	Portugal	Diogo Antunes, Francis Obikwelu, Arnaldo Abrantes, Yazaldes Nascimento	DNF	
