= Dariusz Kuć =

Polish sprinter (born 1986)

Personal information
- Nationality: Poland
- Born: 24 April 1986 (age 40) Kraków, Poland
- Height: 1.76 m (5 ft 9 in)
- Weight: 73 kg (161 lb)

Sport
- Sport: Running
- Events: 100 metres, 200 metres
Medal record
Men's athletics
Representing Poland
World Youth Championships
| Silver medal – second place | 2003 Sherbrooke | Medley relay |
European Championships
| Silver medal – second place | 2006 Gothenburg | 4×100 m relay |
Summer Universiade
| Silver medal – second place | 2009 Belgrade | 4 × 100 m relay |
| Bronze medal – third place | 2013 Kazan | 4 × 100 m relay |

Dariusz Kuć (born 24 April 1986) is a Polish sprint athlete. His personal best time over 100 metres is 10.15 seconds, achieved in June 2011 in Kraków.

At the 2006 European Athletics Championships he finished sixth in the 100 metres final and won a silver medal, running the anchor leg, in the 4 × 100 m relay. He also competed at the 2006 World Indoor Championships, the 2007 World Championships and the 2008 Olympic Games without reaching the final. However, in Beijing he qualified for the second round after finishing fifth in his heat behind Asafa Powell, Kim Collins, Craig Pickering and Daniel Grueso. His time of 10.44 was the 9th fastest losing time after the 10.25 of Nobuharu Asahara, advancing him to the second round. In that second round he only came to 10.46 seconds, which was the seventh time of the heat, causing elimination. Together with Marcin Nowak, Łukasz Chyła and Marcin Jędrusiński he also competed at the 4×100 metres relay. In their qualification heat they did not finish due to a mistake in the baton exchange and they were eliminated.

== Achievements ==
| Year | Competition | Venue | Position | Event | Notes |
Representing Poland
| 2003 | European Junior Championships | Tampere, Finland | 12th (h) | 100 m | 10.80 |
| 2003 | World Youth Championships | Sherbrooke, Canada | 17th (sf) | 100 m | 11.06 |
| 2003 | World Youth Championships | Sherbrooke, Canada | 2nd | Medley relay | 1:53.08 |
| 2004 | World Junior Championships | Grosseto, Italy | 37th (h) | 100m | 10.83 (wind: -0.2 m/s) |
| 2004 | World Junior Championships | Grosseto, Italy | 5th | 4 × 100 m relay | 40.13 |
| 2005 | European Junior Championships | Kaunas, Lithuania | 6th | 100 m | 10.84 |
| 2005 | European Junior Championships | Kaunas, Lithuania | 2nd | 4 × 100 m relay | 40.03 |
| 2006 | World Indoor Championships | Moscow, Russia | 10th (sf) | 60 m | 6.64 |
| 2006 | European Championships | Gothenburg, Sweden | 6th | 100 m | 10.21 |
| 2006 | European Championships | Gothenburg, Sweden | 2nd | 4 × 100 m relay | 39.05 |
| 2007 | European U23 Championships | Debrecen, Hungary | 5th | 100 m | 10.41 |
| 2007 | European U23 Championships | Debrecen, Hungary | — | 200m | DNF |
| 2007 | European U23 Championships | Debrecen, Hungary | 1st (h) | 4 × 100 m relay | 39.27 |
| 2007 | World Championships | Osaka, Japan | 24th (qf) | 100 m | 10.37 |
| 2007 | World Championships | Osaka, Japan | – | 4 × 100 m relay | DNF |
| 2008 | Olympic Games | Beijing, China | 39th (qf) | 100 m | 10.46 |
| 2008 | Olympic Games | Beijing, China | – | 4 × 100 m relay | DNF |
| 2009 | European Indoor Championships | Turin, Italy | 6th | 60 m | 6.62 |
| 2009 | Universiade | Belgrade, Serbia | 11th (sf) | 100 m | 10.48 |
| 2009 | Universiade | Belgrade, Serbia | 2nd | 4 × 100 m relay | 39.21 |
| 2009 | World Championships | Berlin, Germany | 31st (qf) | 100 m | 10.38 |
| 2010 | European Championships | Barcelona, Spain | 23rd (sf) | 100 m | 10.65 |
| 2010 | European Championships | Barcelona, Spain | 5th | 4 × 100 m relay | 38.83 |
| 2011 | World Championships | Daegu, South Korea | 23rd (sf) | 100 m | 10.51 |
| 2011 | World Championships | Daegu, South Korea | 4th | 4 × 100 m relay | 38.50 |
| 2012 | European Championships | Helsinki, Finland | 12th (sf) | 100 m | 10.38 |
| 2012 | European Championships | Helsinki, Finland | – | 4 × 100 m relay | DNF |
| 2012 | Olympic Games | London, United Kingdom | 27th (h) | 100 m | 10.24 |
| 2012 | Olympic Games | London, United Kingdom | 9th (h) | 4 × 100 m relay | 38.31 |
| 2013 | Universiade | Kazan, Russia | 3rd | 4 × 100 m relay | 39.29 |
| 2014 | World Indoor Championships | Sopot, Poland | 11th (sf) | 60 m | 6.60 |
| 2014 | IAAF World Relays | Nassau, Bahamas | 13th | 4 × 100 m relay | 39.31 |
| 2014 | European Championships | Zürich, Switzerland | 6th | 4 × 100 m relay | 38.85 |
