= Christian Blum =

German track and field sprinter

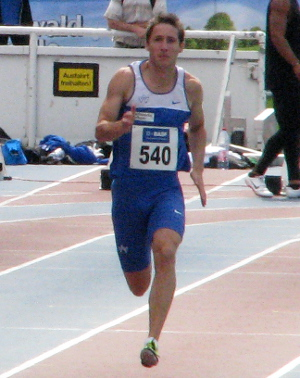
- Blum competing in Mannheim in 2011.

Medal record

Men's athletics

Representing Germany

European Indoor Championships
Silver medal – second place	2015 Prague	60 m

Christian Blum (born 10 March 1987) is a German track and field sprinter who specialises in the 100 metres and 60 metres. He holds personal bests of 10.20 seconds and 6.56 seconds for those events. He was the 60 m silver medallist at the European Athletics Indoor Championships in 2015. He has also won medals with the 4 × 100 metres relay team. He is a five-time German champion over 60 m.

== Career ==
Born in Neubrandenburg, he initially took part in canoe racing as a youngster, but turned more to athletics after the age of thirteen. He later joined the athletics section of the TV Wattenscheid 01 sports club.

His first international competition was the 2005 European Athletics Junior Championships, where he was a 200 metres semi-finalist and a gold medallist with the German 4 × 100 metres relay team. He established himself on the national scene in 2006 with German junior titles over 60 metres and 200 m indoors, then an outdoor 100 metres national junior title. That year he also competed at the 2006 World Junior Championships in Athletics and was a semi-finalist in the 100 m and a relay finalist.

Blum reached the peak of national athletics in his first year as a senior by winning the 60 m title at the 2007 German Indoor Athletics Championships. This led to his first senior international call-up and he was a semi-finalist over that distance at the 2007 European Athletics Indoor Championships. He ran in three events at the 2007 European Athletics U23 Championships: he was seventh in the 100 m final but failed to finish in the relay and 200 m. He did manage third place in the 2007 European Cup 100 m, however. He improved his personal bests over all distance that year: 10.26 seconds for the 100 m, 20.85 seconds for the 200 m and 6.59 seconds for the 60 m.

He missed the majority of the 2008 season after suffering a thigh injury and his sole highlights of 2009 were a new 60 m best of 6.56 seconds and a seventh-place finish in the relay at the 2009 European Athletics U23 Championships. He returned to form in 2010, being runner-up to Alexander Kosenkow over 100 m at the 2010 German Athletics Championships. He teamed up with Kosenkow to take third in the relay at the 2010 European Team Championships, then was an individual semi-finalist at the 2010 European Athletics Championships.

He won his second national title at the start of 2011, topping the podium at the German Indoor Championships, but failed to get past the 60 m heats at the 2011 European Athletics Indoor Championships. He was national runner-up in the 100 m again at the 2011 German Athletics Championships – this time to Tobias Unger. He has a similar 2012 season, retaining his German indoor title and reaching the semi-finals at the 2012 IAAF World Indoor Championships.

After an absence during the 2013 season, he returned to top condition in the 2014 season. That year, the 27-year-old finally improved his 100 m best to 10.20 seconds, beating his previous mark which has stood since 2007. He won the fourth German 60 m title at the beginning of the year. He also helped the German relay quartet, including Sven Knipphals, Kosenkow and Julian Reus, to second place at the 2014 European Team Championships held in his native Germany.

Blum equalled his 60 m best at the German Indoor Championships in 2015, winning in a time of 6.56 seconds. He finally reached an international individual podium at the 2015 European Athletics Indoor Championships. Finishing behind the reigning world champion Richard Kilty, he edged out his compatriot Reus to claim the 60 m silver medal.

== Personal bests ==
Outdoor

- 100 metres – 10.20 (2014)
- 200 metres – 20.85 (2007)

Indoor

- 60 metres – 6.56 (2009 & 2015)
- 200 metres – 21.37 (2007)
- All information from IAAF.

== International competitions ==
Year	Competition	Venue	Position	Event	Notes
Representing Germany
2005	European Junior Championships	Kaunas, Lithuania	16th (semis)	100 m	10.93
2005	European Junior Championships	Kaunas, Lithuania	1st	4 × 100 m	39.90
2006	World Junior Championships	Beijing, China	11th (semis)	100 m	10.59 (wind: -0.9 m/s)
2006	World Junior Championships	Beijing, China	DNF	4 × 100 m	DNF
2007	European Indoor Championships	Birmingham, United Kingdom	9th (semis)	60 m	6.66
2007	European U23 Championships	Debrecen, Hungary	7th	100 m	10.48 (wind: 0.2 m/s)
2007	European U23 Championships	Debrecen, Hungary	—	200 m	DNF (heats)
2007	European U23 Championships	Debrecen, Hungary	—	4 × 100 m	DNF
2009	European U23 Championships	Kaunas, Lithuania	7th	4 × 100 m	40.06
2010	European Team Championships	Bergen, Norway	3rd	4 × 100 m	39.07
2010	European Championships	Barcelona, Spain	24th (semis)	100 m	10.69
2011	European Indoor Championships	Paris, France	27th (heats)	60 m	6.80
2012	World Indoor Championships	Istanbul, Turkey	16th (semis)	60 m	6.79
2014	European Team Championships	Braunschweig, Germany	2nd	4 × 100 m	38.88
2015	European Indoor Championships	Prague, Czech Republic	2nd	60 m	6.58

== National titles ==
- German Indoor Athletics Championships
  - 60 metres: 2007, 2011, 2012, 2014, 2015
