= 2015 European Athletics Indoor Championships – Men's 60 metres =

The men's 60 metres event at the 2015 European Athletics Indoor Championships was held on 7 March 2015 at 10:35 (heats), on 8 March at 14:55 (semifinals) and 17:15 (final) local time.

== Medalists ==
Gold	Silver	Bronze
Richard Kilty; Great Britain	Christian Blum; Germany	Julian Reus; Germany

== Results ==
=== Heats ===
Qualification: First 4 of each heat (Q) and the next 4 fastest (q) qualified for the semifinals.

Rank	Heat	Athlete	Nationality	Time	Note
1	2	Richard Kilty	Great Britain	6.57	Q
1	4	Chijindu Ujah	Great Britain	6.57	Q
3	1	Lucas Jakubczyk	Germany	6.62	Q
3	5	Julian Reus	Germany	6.62	Q
5	1	Emmanuel Biron	France	6.63	Q, SB
5	5	Michael Tumi	Italy	6.63	Q, SB
7	2	Brian Mariano	Netherlands	6.64	Q, =SB
7	3	Pascal Mancini	Switzerland	6.64	Q, SB
9	1	Cătălin Cîmpeanu	Romania	6.65	Q
9	2	Ángel David Rodríguez	Spain	6.65	Q, SB
9	3	Christian Blum	Germany	6.65	Q
9	4	Denis Dimitrov	Bulgaria	6.65	Q, PB
13	3	Remigiusz Olszewski	Poland	6.66	Q
14	5	Sean Safo-Antwi	Great Britain	6.67	Q
15	5	Odain Rose	Sweden	6.67	Q, SB
16	2	Zvonimir Ivašković	Croatia	6.68	Q, PB
16	4	Kamil Kryński	Poland	6.68	Q, PB
18	1	Yasaldes Nascimento	Portugal	6.68	Q, PB
18	1	Fabio Cerutti	Italy	6.69	q, SB
18	2	Erik Hagberg	Sweden	6.69	q
18	4	Delmas Obou	Italy	6.69	Q
18	5	Morten Madsen	Denmark	6.69	q, PB
23	3	Jan Veleba	Czech Republic	6.71	Q
24	3	Ville Myllymäki	Finland	6.72	q
25	1	János Sipos	Hungary	6.73	
26	4	Zdeněk Stromšík	Czech Republic	6.74	
27	3	Jakub Matúš	Slovakia	6.75	PB
28	5	Marek Bakalář	Czech Republic	6.79	
29	2	Markus Fuchs	Austria	6.85	
30	4	Ján Volko	Slovakia	6.86	
31	4	Luka Rakić	Montenegro	6.87	
32	3	Richard Pulst	Estonia	6.88	
33	1	Riste Pandev	Macedonia	6.91	SB
33	2	Tomáš Benko	Slovakia	6.91	
35	5	Rachid Chouhal	Malta	7.06	
36	5	Sean Penalver	Gibraltar	7.75	
	1	Efthímios Steryioúlis	Greece	DQ	R162.7

=== Semifinals ===
Qualification: First 2 of each heat (Q) and the next 2 fastest (q) qualified for the final.

Rank	Heat	Athlete	Nationality	Time	Note
1	3	Richard Kilty	Great Britain	6.53	Q, SB
2	2	Chijindu Ujah	Great Britain	6.57	Q
3	1	Lucas Jakubczyk	Germany	6.59	Q
4	2	Pascal Mancini	Switzerland	6.60	Q, =NR
5	2	Christian Blum	Germany	6.60	q
6	1	Emmanuel Biron	France	6.61	Q, SB
7	3	Michael Tumi	Italy	6.62	Q, SB
8	3	Julian Reus	Germany	6.62	q
9	1	Sean Safo-Antwi	Great Britain	6.63	
10	1	Brian Mariano	Netherlands	6.64	=SB
11	1	Denis Dimitrov	Bulgaria	6.66	
11	3	Remigiusz Olszewski	Poland	6.66	
13	1	Fabio Cerutti	Italy	6.67	SB
14	3	Yasaldes Nascimento	Portugal	6.67	PB
15	2	Delmas Obou	Italy	6.68	
16	2	Kamil Kryński	Poland	6.69	
17	2	Zvonimir Ivašković	Croatia	6.71	
18	2	Erik Hagberg	Sweden	6.72	
19	2	Cătălin Cîmpeanu	Romania	6.73	
20	1	Odain Rose	Sweden	6.74	
20	3	Jan Veleba	Czech Republic	6.74	
22	3	Ville Myllymäki	Finland	6.81	
23	3	Ángel David Rodríguez	Spain	6.91	
24	1	Morten Madsen	Denmark	9.47	

=== Final ===
Rank	Lane	Athlete	Nationality	Time	Note
1st place, gold medalist(s)	3	Richard Kilty	Great Britain	6.51	SB
2nd place, silver medalist(s)	1	Christian Blum	Germany	6.58	
3rd place, bronze medalist(s)	2	Julian Reus	Germany	6.60	=SB
4	8	Michael Tumi	Italy	6.61	SB
5	4	Pascal Mancini	Switzerland	6.62	
6	6	Lucas Jakubczyk	Germany	6.62	
7	7	Emmanuel Biron	France	6.72	
	5	Chijindu Ujah	Great Britain	DQ	R162.7
