= Aleixo-Platini Menga =

German sprinter

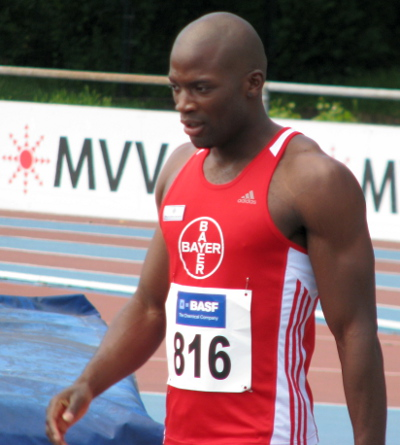

Personal information
- Nationality: German
- Born: 29 September 1987 (age 38) Luanda, Angola
- Height: 1.82 m (6 ft 0 in)
- Weight: 82 kg (181 lb)

Sport
- Country: Germany
- Sport: Athletics
- Event: Sprint
- Club: TSV Bayer 04 Leverkusen

Achievements and titles
- Personal bests: 100 m: 10.09 (2018); 200 m: 20.27 (2016)

Aleixo-Platini Menga (born 29 September 1987 in Luanda) is a German sprinter, born in Angola.

== Biography ==
His personal best on 200 metres (20.27) is the third best German performance of all-time.

== International competitions ==
Year	Competition	Venue	Position	Event	Notes
Representing Germany
2007	European U23 Championships	Debrecen, Hungary	15th (sf)	100 m	10.55 (+1.6 m/s)
2007	European U23 Championships	Debrecen, Hungary	4th (h)^{†}	4 × 100 m relay	39.57^{†}
2009	European U23 Championships	Kaunas, Lithuania	2nd	200 m	20.59 (-0.2 m/s)
2009	World Championships	Berlin, Germany	16th (qf)	200 m	20.68 (-0.3 m/s)
2015	World Championships	Beijing, China	4th	4 × 100 m relay	38.15
2016	European Championships	Amsterdam, Netherlands	19th (sf)	200 m	21.06
2016	Olympic Games	Rio de Janeiro, Brazil	61st (h)	200 m	20.80
2017	European Indoor Championships	Belgrade, Serbia	12th (sf)	60 m	6.73
2017	World Relays	Nassau, Bahamas	2nd (B)	4 × 100 m relay	39.15
2017	World Relays	Nassau, Bahamas	–	4 × 200 m relay	DNF
2018	European Championships	Berlin, Germany	20th (sf)	200 m	20.83
2019	World Relays	Yokohama, Japan	3rd	4 × 200 m relay	1:21.26

^{†}: Did not finish in the final.

== See also ==
- German all-time top lists - 200 metres
