= Delmas Obou =

Italian sprinter (born 1991)

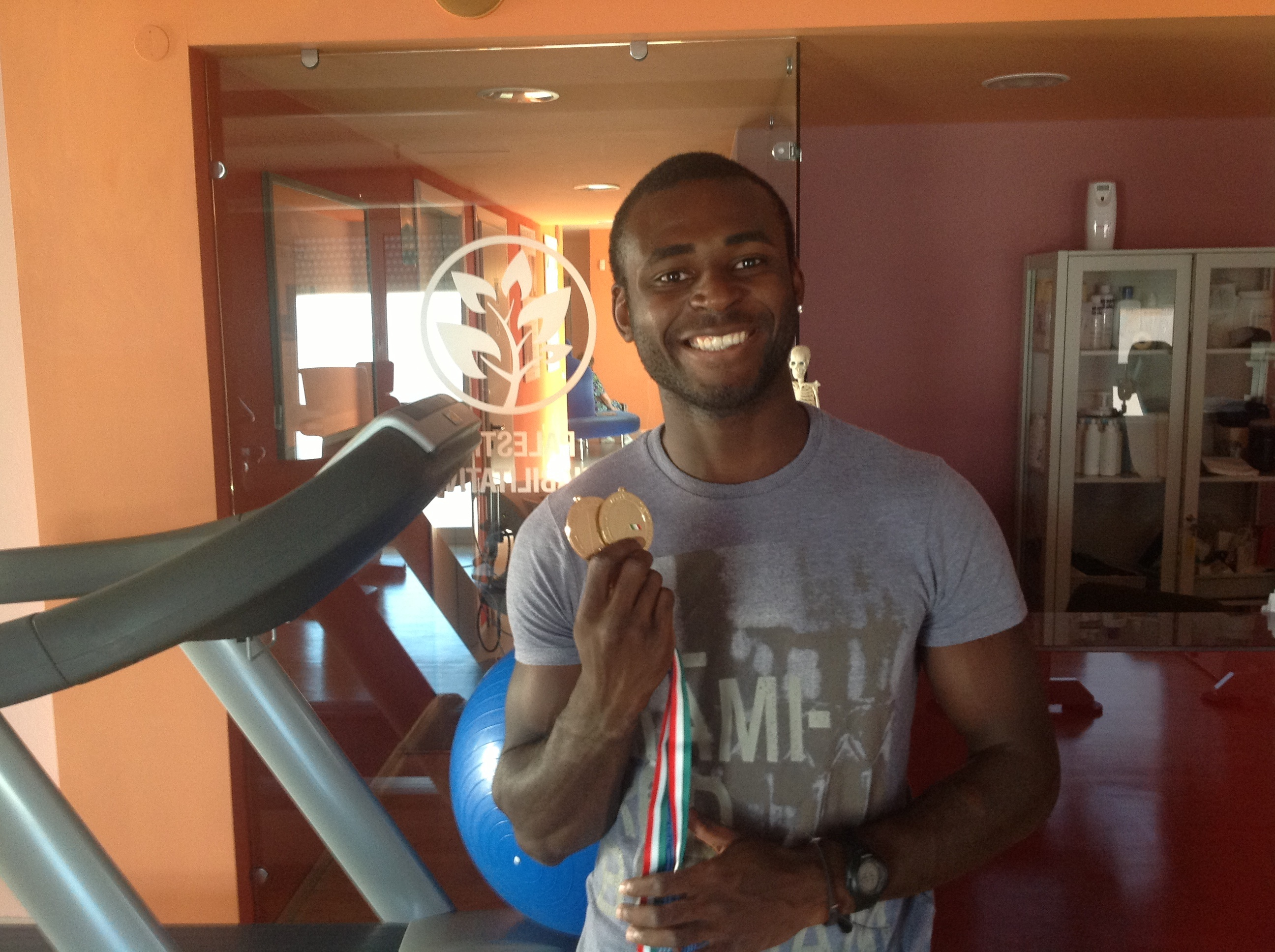

Personal information
- Full name: Josè Delmas Obou
- Nationality: Italian
- Born: 25 October 1991 (age 34) Treichville, Ivory Coast
- Height: 1.84 m (6 ft 0 in)
- Weight: 80 kg (176 lb)

Sport
- Country: Italy
- Sport: Athletics
- Event: Sprint
- Club: G.S. Fiamme Gialle

Achievements and titles
- Personal bests: 100 m: 10.27 (2013); 60 m: 6.66 (2015)
Medal record
European U23 Championships
Gold medal – first place	Ostrava 2011	4×100 m relay
European Team Championships
Bronze medal – third place	Braunschweig 2014	4×100 m relay
Bronze medal – third place	Cheboksary 2015	4×100 m relay

Delmas Obou (born 25 October 1991) is an Italian male sprinter, which participated at the 2013 World Championships in Athletics.

== Biography ==
His parents are from Ivory Coast and moved to Italy in 1993, he reached them in 1999 at the age of eight, so he soon became Italian citizen.

== Achievements ==
Year	Competition	Venue	Position	Event	Performance	Notes
2013	World Championships	(Russia) Moscow	10th Semi	4 × 100 m relay	38.49	SB
2014	European Championships	(Switzerland) Zürich	17th Semi	100 m	10.41	SB
2014	European Championships	(Switzerland) Zürich	Final	4 × 100 m relay	DNF	SB
2015	European Indoor Championships	(Czech Republic) Prague	15th Semi	60 m	6.68	

== National titles ==
He won 3 national championships at individual senior level.

- Italian Athletics Championships
  - 100 metres: 2013, 2014
- Italian Indoor Athletics Championships
  - 60 metres: 2015

== Bobsleigh ==
In the winter Olympics 2022, he joined the Italian 4-person bobsleigh team with Mattia Variola.
