= Marek Niit =

Estonian sprinter

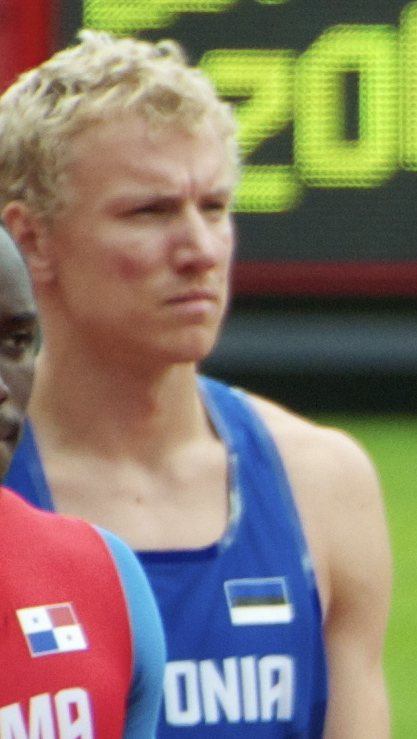
- Niit in 2012

Medal record

Representing Estonia

Men's athletics

World Junior Championships
Gold medal – first place	2006 Beijing	200 m

Marek Niit (born 9 August 1987, in Kuressaare) is a sprinter from Estonia who won a gold medal at the 200 metres at the 2006 World Junior Championships in Athletics in Beijing, China. He is also the current national record holder in 100 metres, 200 meters and 400 meters.

Competing for the Arkansas Razorbacks track and field team, Niit won the 2012 and 2013 4 × 400 meter relay at the NCAA Division I Indoor Track and Field Championships.

== International competitions ==
Year	Competition	Venue	Position	Event	Result
Representing Estonia
2005	European Junior Championships	Kaunas, Lithuania	15th (sf)	100 m	10.85
2005	European Junior Championships	Kaunas, Lithuania	6th	200 m	21.47
2006	World Junior Championships	Beijing, China	1st	200 m	20.96 (-1.1 m/s)
2007	European Indoor Championships	Birmingham, United Kingdom	24th (h)	60 m	6.87
2007	European U23 Championships	Debrecen, Hungary	15th (sf)	200 m	27.46
2009	European U23 Championships	Kaunas, Lithuania	5th	200 m	20.88
2009	European U23 Championships	Kaunas, Lithuania	8th	4 × 400 m relay	3:12.30
2009	World Championships	Berlin, Germany	39th (h)	200 m	21.21
2011	World Championships	Daegu, South Korea	32nd (h)	100 m	10.53
2011	World Championships	Daegu, South Korea	29th (h)	200 m	20.90
2012	European Championships	Helsinki, Finland	21st (sf)	200 m	21.44
2012	Olympic Games	London, United Kingdom	38th (h)	200 m	20.82
2014	World Indoor Championships	Sopot, Poland	11th (sf)	400 m	47.67
2014	European Championships	Zürich, Switzerland	23rd (h)	200 m	21.04
2014	European Championships	Zürich, Switzerland	9th (sf)	400 m	45.80
2014	European Championships	Zürich, Switzerland	12th (h)	4 × 100 m relay	39.52
2015	European Indoor Championships	Prague, Czech Republic	23rd (h)	400 m	47.79
2016	World Indoor Championships	Portland, United States	18th (h)	400 m	47.39
2016	European Championships	Amsterdam, Netherlands	17th (h)	100 m	10.48
2016	European Championships	Amsterdam, Netherlands	23rd (h)	200 m	21.93
2016	European Championships	Amsterdam, Netherlands	15th (h)	4 × 400 m relay	3:10.63

== Personal Best ==
=== Personal bests – Outdoor ===
- 100 meters – 10.19 s (2012) Arkansas Spring Invitational NR
- 200 meters – 20.43 s (2011) NCAA Division I Championships NR
- 300 meters – 32.24 s (2014) Rieti Meeting 2014 NR
- 400 meters – 45.74 s (2014) European Championships NR

=== Personal bests – Indoor ===
- 50 meters – 5.92 s (2008)
- 60 meters – 6.73 s (2007)
- 200 meters – 20.63 s (2014) NR
- 400 meters – 45.99 s (2011) NR
- 600 meters – 1.22,92 (2011)
