= Richard Kilty =

British sprinter (born 1989)

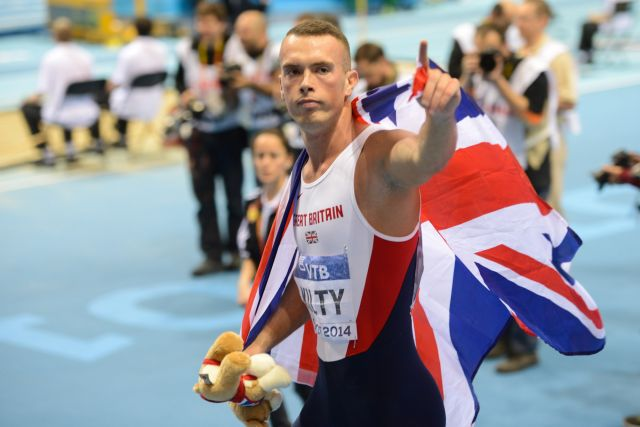
- Kilty at the 2014 IAAF World Indoor Championships

Personal information
- Nationality: British (English)
- Born: 2 September 1989 (age 37) Middlesbrough, England
- Education: Northfield School and Sports College
- Height: 1.84 m (6 ft 0 in)
- Weight: 82 kg (181 lb)

Sport
- Sport: Athletics
- Event: Sprinting
- Club: Gateshead Harriers

Achievements and titles
- Personal bests: 60 m: 6.49 (Sopot 2014) 100 m: 10.01 (tottenham 2016) 200 m: 20.34 (La Chaux-de-Fonds, 2013)
Medal record
Men's athletics
Representing Great Britain
Olympic Games
Bronze medal – third place	2024 Paris	4 × 100 m relay
Disqualified	2020 Tokyo	4 × 100 m relay
World Championships
Silver medal – second place	2019 Doha	4 × 100 m relay
World Indoor Championships
Gold medal – first place	2014 Sopot	60 m
European Championships
Gold medal – first place	2014 Zurich	4 × 100 m relay
European Indoor Championships
Gold medal – first place	2015 Prague	60 m
Gold medal – first place	2017 Belgrade	60 m
European U23 Championships
Silver medal – second place	2011 Ostrava	4 × 100 m relay
World Relays
Bronze medal – third place	2014 Bahamas	4 × 100 m relay
Representing England
Commonwealth Games
Gold medal – first place	2018 Gold Coast	4 × 100 m relay
Silver medal – second place	2014 Glasgow	4 × 100 m relay

Richard Kilty (born 2 September 1989) is a British former sprinter who competed both Indoor and Outdoor across all the sprint events including 60 metres, 100 metres, 150 metres, and 200 metres. An exceptional starter, and considered a specialist in both 60 metres and relays, he is a former World and double European Champion indoors at 60 metres, and also a silver medalist in the World Athletics Championships, as well as a European and Commonwealth champion in the 4 × 100 metre relay for Great Britain and England respectively. Kilty is one of the few British athletes to have won medals at every major championships, indoors and out, including the World Relays.

A core member of the Great Britain relay squad, Kilty has won medals at every major championship, including a global silver medal running legs in the finals of the World Championships in 2019. Kilty was one of the few British athletes to have won medals in all seven available major indoor and outdoor championships, including gold in both the Commonwealth Games and the European Athletics Championships as a relay runner, gold in the European and World Indoors as a 60-metre specialist, and medals, again as a relay runner, in the World Athletics World Relays, the World Athletics specialist event for international relays runners.

Having originally won silver in the relay event at the 2020 Summer Olympics, on 18 February 2022 it was announced that Kilty and his teammates Nethaneel Mitchell-Blake, Zharnel Hughes, and CJ Ujah would be stripped of their 4 × 100 metres relay 2020 Summer Olympics silver medals after Court of Arbitration for Sport found CJ Ujah guilty of a doping violation. Three years later, aged 34, he was a heat runner as Great Britain won the bronze medal in the 4 × 100 metres relay in Paris.

Having been coached for several years by 1992 Olympic 100 m champion Linford Christie, Kilty switched to Rana Reider in late 2013, when the American coach was recruited by UK Athletics. He is the 2014 World, and 2015 and 2017 European Indoor 60 m champion. He also gained numerous British national sprint titles, including UK junior 100 m champion and two-time English Schools national 100 metres champion, during his years at Northfield School and Sports College. On the British club-level he represents Gateshead Harriers.

Nicknamed "The Teesside Tornado" His personal bests for the three individual events are 6.49 seconds (60 m), 10.01 seconds (100 m) and 20.34 seconds (200 m), respectively.

As an age-grade runner he was ranked first in Great Britain over 200 m in the U23 age group in 2011, with a time of 20.53 seconds. He won a silver at the 2011 European Athletics U23 Championships with the British 4 × 100 metres relay team. For the majority of 2011 he was without a coach and not funded, but he achieved personal bests in the 100 and 200 m.

Kilty announced his retirement from athletics in March 2025.

== Early career ==
After winning the 2014 World indoor sprint title, Kilty spoke to BBC News in mid-March about his family's dire financial conditions when he was young. Kilty broke the aged-12 UK record for 60 m in 2001 and since then competed for Great Britain throughout the youth levels. "It's been a crazy journey. I actually won my first national title [in 2001] whilst living in a homeless hostel," he said, sharing a one bedroom flat with his parents and 4 brothers and sisters. His father, Kevin Kilty, is Richard's strongest supporter and was himself a 10.8 sprinter in his youth before turning to bodybuilding and later becoming a bodyguard (according to an April 2012 interview with Athletics Weekly).

In July 2006, Kilty won the English Schools (national) Championship in 100 metres in the Intermediate age group (under 17) with a time of 11.0, when the championship was held in Gateshead. He repeated as champion at the Senior level (age 17–18) in July 2007, winning in 10.73. [Note: Schoolboys are limited to a single event (plus a relay), because of the huge number of athletes who compete in the Championships each summer.] Kilty was then named as a captain of the GB team at the 2008 IAAF World Juniors in Bydgoszcz, where he made the semi-finals of his favoured 200 metres. But his progress stalled a little as he trained alone in Middlesbrough before moving to London in 2011 to train under the tutelage of coach Linford Christie, to include winter training in Arizona in early 2012.

Kilty won the 60 m at the 2009 "Athletics Ashes" England Vs Australia Great North City Games, where he won in a time of 6.67 seconds.

== On track for London 2012 ==
During the 2012 indoor season, Kilty lowered his 60 m best to 6.61 seconds, at Birmingham on 4 February 2012. But he had to cut short his indoor season after picking up a slight hamstring problem, saying "I felt I was in shape to run 6.5" and compete at the Aviva Indoor Grand Prix in Birmingham. Then at an early season outdoor meet in the United States, Kilty set a new personal bests in both the 100 and 200 metres, clocking 10.23 and 20.50 seconds respectively at the Sun Angel Classic meet in Tempe, Arizona on 7 April 2012. His time bettered the "A" qualifying standard (20.51) for the upcoming London Olympics (in early August), while his 100 m time was just inside the "B" standard of 10.24. However, he failed to improve on those early season marks. At the 2012 Aviva British National trials – held at Birmingham's Alexander Stadium, where athletes were selected for the London Olympics – Kilty entered only one event, the 200 metres, skipping the 100 m. After running fourth-fastest in heats (21.09), he finished last (out of eight) in the 200 m finals on 24 June, running only 21.15 seconds despite a blazing fast start. Afterwards he said a hamstring muscle "pulled" during the Finals race.

Team GB selected only two men, first and second-place finishers Christian Malcolm and James Ellington, for the 200 m, rejecting Kilty despite his having met the qualifying time. (Nations are entitled to send three runners per event if all three meet the "A" standard qualifying time.) Not only did Team GB officials decide to leave Kilty off the Olympic team, but he was also left off the squad headed to the European Championships in Helsinki later that month – despite having been provisionally named in the 100 metres the week before Nationals.

The athletics officials who selected Team GB for London said Kilty was not included in the squad because he lacked current form, having strained a hamstring muscle at the British Championships.

=== 2012 London Olympic snubbing by Team GB selectors ===
Kilty was upset about his treatment by British Athletics officials who selected the UK team for the 2012 London Olympics. They deliberately left him off Team GB, and they eliminated funding for his training – which was his only source of income. Kilty had met the qualifying standard for the Olympics in the 200 metres and believed that even though a pulled hamstring compromised his training in final weeks before the Games, he should have been the UK's third entry in the 200 m. The team selectors choose instead not to fill the third slot. The chance of a lifetime to compete "at home", before friends and family, on the world's biggest sporting stage was denied him.

After his lottery funding was cut, he was reliant on his family for support. "I couldn't have become world champion without my parents, especially my dad," Kilty told BBC. "We didn't have much money and he sacrificed jobs and funded my athletics for a long time – I couldn't be more grateful. When I was younger we had a lot of struggles and moved to a lot of different council estates. I just hope I can motivate people on Teesside. No matter your background, if you're willing to never take no for an answer and give things a shot, you can achieve your dreams."

=== 2013: A difficult year of decision ===
After an unsuccessful appeal against his Olympics omission in 2012, Kilty thought about walking away from the sport, saying he felt "let down" by governing body British Athletics. Forced to rest because of his hamstring, he struggled to get by without any funding. Kilty wound up taking nearly six months off from training- the last half of 2012. Kilty would say, later, that he was desperately close to quitting the sport and, by way of a job, he considered joining the army. Reflecting back on the difficulties of 2013 – following his March 2014 win at Sopot – Kilty told UK's Sky Sports, "I considered quitting because I had no income and had to train on the road in trainers [running shoes]. I couldn't afford to get to the track. Nobody's had it harder than me last year."

In mid-January 2013 he resumed training for the indoor season and after four weeks entered his first race, winning the 60 metres at the North East Counties Indoor Championship at Gateshead College Indoor Athletics Arena on 17 February 2013, with a time of 6.69 seconds in the heats and 6.62 victory in the finals, both times under the meet record of 6.68. However, his time at Gateshead was just outside the qualifying standard of 6.60 for the 2013 European Indoor Championships and once again he would fail to improve on his early season form. In spring 2013 he started lifting weights again and conducted sprint workouts at his local Middlesbrough track and occasionally along the banks of the River Tees, as his father supervised his workouts.

=== More disappointment with 2013 World Championships in Moscow ===
The 2013 outdoor season brought a dramatic improvement in the 200 m, as Kilty ran a personal best of 20.34 seconds at the annual Résisprint International sprinters meet in La Chaux-de-Fonds, Switzerland (at 1,000 metres elevation) on 7 July 2013. He also ran 10.24 seconds in the 100 m at the Swiss meet. One week later, at the Sainsbury's British National Championships in Birmingham – where the team for the 2013 World Championships in Athletics was selected – Kilty skipped the 100 m to focus on the 200. He opened with the fastest start and qualifying time of 20.65 in heats on 14 July, but in the finals that night he finished second (20.50) to James Ellington (20.45).

But when athletes were named to Team GB for the outdoor World Championships held in Moscow in mid-August), 2nd-place finisher Kilty was left off the 200 m in favour of Adam Gemili (who had competed at the European Under-23 Championships), winner Ellington and 3rd-place finisher Delano Williams. However, he was included as relay squad member and he ran the lead-off leg of the 4 X 100M in the heats at Moscow, where the team qualified with the second-fastest time (38.12 seconds) behind the United States. But in the Finals, Kilty was replaced by Adam Gemili. Britain would finish 3rd, but was then disqualified for an illegal baton handover. Two weeks after Worlds, Kilty improved his best time in the 100 m to 10.10 seconds at a (relatively minor) track meet in Hexham, northern England on Saturday 31 August 2013 (still coached at that time by Linford Christie).

=== Fortunes improve, late 2013 ===
In October 2013, British Athletics' restored Kilty's funding – but only at the lower level of "Podium Potential". Nonetheless, the lottery funding allowed him to shift his training to the English Midlands, joining the British Athletics High Performance Athletics Centre (HiPAC) at Loughborough University so that he could train, full-time, with elite-level athletes under coach Rana Reider, with friend and fellow Teesside long jumper Chris Tomlinson. While acknowledging the strong local support he had received in northeast England, Kilty said the move south to the Loughborough HiPAC was necessary because of the lack of elite-level sprinters with which to train in Teesside. A late 2013 winter training camp in South Africa also greatly improved Kilty's fitness and attitude towards the sport.

== Breakthrough at 2014 World Indoor championships ==
At the 2014 British Indoor Championships held in Birmingham on 8 February 2014, Kilty lowered his personal best in the 60 metres to 6.58 in the semi-finals, and he then ran 6.53 in the finals to finish third behind James Dasaolu and Dwain Chambers. With just the top two allowed to compete at the World Indoor Championships, Kilty looked to be left on the sidelines again. But he was added to Team GB one week later, when Dasaolu strained his left hamstring muscle while winning another 60 m race in Birmingham on 15 February. His selection for the World Indoors was his first as an individual competitor at the senior-level, having previously been named only as a member of 4 × 100 m relay squads.

Given his first opportunity to represent Team GB as a senior in a major individual competition, Kilty made the most of it. In the semi-finals at Sopot, he lowered his personal best to 6.52 in the semi-finals. He then won the 15th World Indoor Athletics Championships 60 m indoor title with a new personal best of 6.49 seconds on 8 March 2014, running at sea level in the Baltic Sea city of Sopot, Poland. In both the semi-final and final he registered the fastest reaction times of any competitor, with 0.122 and 0.129, respectively. The Finals were the closest race in the history of World Indoor Championships, as all eight men crossed the finish line less than one-tenth of a second apart, with the top six runners separated by only 0.04 s.

== Sprint racing and the issue of ethnicity ==
After his win at the World Championships, Kilty said he has set his sights on the outdoors and becoming only the second white man in history to run under 10 seconds, after France's Christophe Lemaitre (who ran a French national record of 9.98 on 9 July 2010, and lowered it to 9.92 on 29 July 2011). Speaking to a group of British sports reporters on 9 March 2014, Kilty said, "I think I can run nine seconds. I'm not going to say I'm going to do it this year or next year but within my career I can run well into nine seconds. I know that's a pretty big statement with my skin colour but I wouldn't mind being the next man to break 10 seconds." Kilty ran a wind-assisted 9.92 in May 2016 when finishing second in the final of the Max Corso Memorial in Gavardo, Italy.

== Reaction times ==
Records maintained by British Athletics show Kilty is the sixth British sprinter ever to have run the 60 m in under 6.50 seconds. Since the end of the 2013 outdoor season he has been coached by Rana Reider who is coaching a number of elite sprinters and jumpers, including Christian Taylor who won gold in the triple jump at the 2012 London Olympics and 2010 60 m World Indoor Champion Dwain Chambers. Long known for his exceptionally fast reaction time at the start of races (as automatically recorded by pressure pads embedded in starting blocks), Kilty routinely reacted to the starter's gun in less than 0.130 seconds, several hundredths of a second faster than his competitors. Under rules established by the IAAF to discourage sprinters from "anticipating" the gun, any racer who reacts faster than 0.10, is deemed to have "false started" and is disqualified. Kilty's win in the 60 metres at the 2014 World Indoor championships was all the more remarkable because of his lack of success in previous major competitions. Prior to his breakthrough at Sopot, during outdoor competitions he had failed to break the 10 and 20-second "barriers" in the 100 and 200 metres, respectively. Sub-10-second 100 m and sub-20-second 200 m times are viewed as the marks necessary to be ranked amongst the world's elite sprinters. As of July 2016, his personal bests outdoors are 10.01 and 20.34.

- As of June 2014, only five British men have run under 10 seconds in the 100 m: Linford Christie, with the UK record of 9.87; Dwain Chambers (9.97); Jason Gardener (9.98); James Dasaolu (9.91); and Chijindu Ujah (9.96).

An online track and field website, SpeedEndurance.com, wrote on 12 March 2014 that across the history of the previous world indoor championships 60 m final (through 2012), there had been a total of 10 sub 6.50 clockings, and all 10 of those athletes had run sub 10 seconds in the 100 metres.

== Personal life ==
Kilty is married to Lithuanian triple jumper Dovilė Dzindzaletaitė, whom he met during the IAAF Diamond League meeting in London. They have a child.
