= Ángel David Rodríguez =

Spanish sprinter

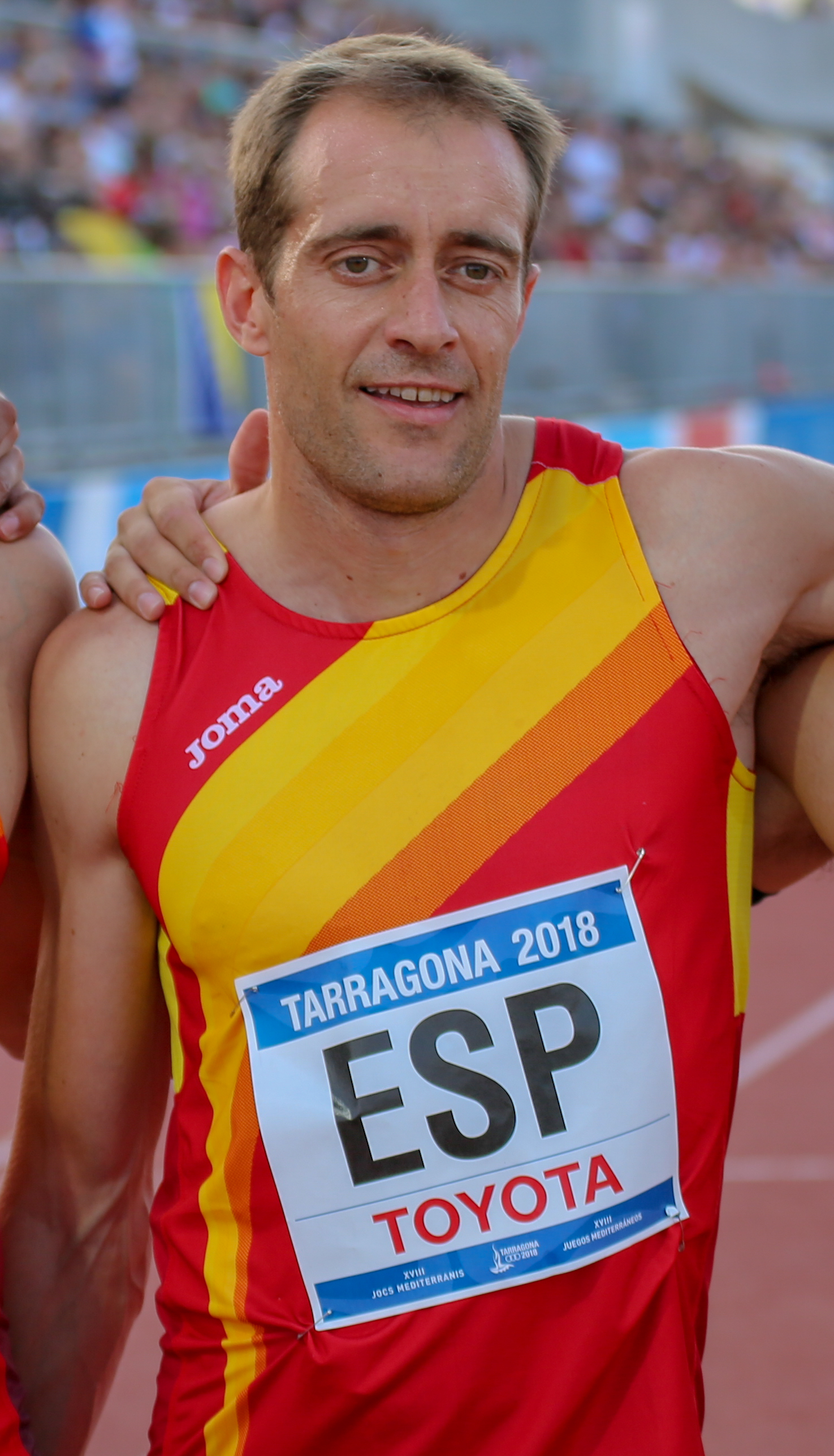
- Ángel David Rodríguez in 2018

Personal information
- Nationality: Spain
- Born: 25 April 1980 (age 46) Madrid, Spain
- Height: 1.78 m (5 ft 10 in)
- Weight: 66 kg (146 lb)

Sport
- Sport: Running
- Events: 100 metres, 200 metres
- Club: FC Barcelona
- Coached by: Juan Carlos Álvarez
Medal record
Men's athletics
Representing Spain
Ibero-American Championships
Silver medal – second place	2010 San Fernando	4×100 m relay

Ángel David Rodríguez García (born 25 April 1980) is a Spanish sprinter. He specializes in the 100 metres. His personal best time is 10.23 seconds in the 100 metres, achieved in July 2008 in Salamanca, and 20.61 seconds in the 200 metres, achieved in July 2008 in Barcelona.

Rodríguez finished eighth in 100 m and 4 × 100 m relay at the 2002 World Cup. He also competed at the 2006 European Championships, the 2007 World Championships, the 2008 World Indoor Championships, the 2008 Olympic Games and the 2012 Olympic Games without reaching the final. In Beijing, he competed at the 100 metres sprint and placed 4th in his heat in a time of 10.34 seconds. Only the first three of each heat qualified, but his time was the third fastest losing time after Nobuharu Asahara's 10.25, advancing him to the next round. There he came to 10.35 but was eliminated after he finished in 8th place in his heat. He also took part in the 200 metres individual, finishing fourth with a time of 20.87 seconds in his first round heat. With 20.96 seconds in his second round he only placed eighth in his heat, which was not enough for the semi-finals.

In 2011, Rodríguez was featured in Castrol's Ronaldo: Tested to the Limit when he ran against Cristiano Ronaldo over a 25-metre straight sprint, in which he beat Ronaldo 0.30 seconds, and a 25-metre zig-zag course, in which Ronaldo beat him by 0.51 seconds.

== Competition record ==
Year	Competition	Venue	Position	Event	Notes
Representing Spain
1998	World Junior Championships	Annecy, France	28th (qf)	100 m	10.91 (−0.7 m/s)
1998	World Junior Championships	Annecy, France	4th	4 × 100 m relay	40.48
1999	European Junior Championships	Riga, Latvia	4th (h)	4 × 100 m relay	40.40
2001	European U23 Championships	Amsterdam, Netherlands	13th (h)	100 m	10.75 (+0.9 m/s)
2001	European U23 Championships	Amsterdam, Netherlands	5th	4 × 100 m relay	40.22
2002	European Championships	Munich, Germany	5th	4 × 100 m relay	39.07
2004	Ibero-American Championships	Huelva, Spain	4th	200 m	21.69
2004	Ibero-American Championships	Huelva, Spain	2nd	4 × 100 m relay	39.70
2005	Mediterranean Games	Almería, Spain	7th (h)	100 m	10.63
2005	Mediterranean Games	Almería, Spain	5th	4 × 100 m relay	39.84
2006	European Championships	Gothenburg, Sweden	10th (sf)	100 m	10.33
2006	European Championships	Gothenburg, Sweden	–	4 × 100 m relay	DQ
2007	European Indoor Championships	Birmingham, United Kingdom	12th (h)	60 m	6.70
2007	World Championships	Osaka, Japan	26th (qf)	100 m	10.39
2008	World Indoor Championships	Valencia, Spain	15th (sf)	60 m	6.70
2008	Olympic Games	Beijing, China	33rd (qf)	100 m	10.35
2008	Olympic Games	Beijing, China	28th (qf)	200 m	20.96
2009	European Indoor Championships	Turin, Italy	19th (h)	60 m	6.73
2009	Mediterranean Games	Pescara, Italy	5th	100 m	10.41
2009	Mediterranean Games	Pescara, Italy	5th	200 m	21.05
2009	World Championships	Berlin, Germany	32nd (qf)	100 m	10.39
2009	World Championships	Berlin, Germany	45th (h)	200 m	21.37
2010	World Indoor Championships	Doha, Qatar	16th (sf)	60 m	6.69
2010	Ibero-American Championships	San Fernando, Spain	2nd	4 × 100 m relay	39.45
2010	European Championships	Barcelona, Spain	19th (sf)	100 m	10.51
2010	European Championships	Barcelona, Spain	8th (sf)	4 × 100 m relay	DNF
2011	European Indoor Championships	Paris, France	22nd (sf)	60 m	6.76
2011	World Championships	Daegu, South Korea	22nd (sf)	100 m	10.49
2012	World Indoor Championships	Istanbul, Turkey	10th (sf)	60 m	6.71
2012	Olympic Games	London, Great Britain	37th (h)	100 m	10.34
2013	World Championships	Moscow, Russia	25th (h)	100 m	10.23
2013	World Championships	Moscow, Russia	9th (h)	4 × 100 m relay	38.46
2014	European Championships	Zürich, Switzerland	22nd (sf)	100 m	10.76
2015	European Indoor Championships	Prague, Czech Republic	23rd (sf)	60 m	6.91
2016	World Indoor Championships	Portland, United States	28th (h)	60 m	6.74
2016	Ibero-American Championships	Rio de Janeiro, Brazil	10th (sf)	100 m	10.45
2016	Ibero-American Championships	Rio de Janeiro, Brazil	4th	4 × 100 m relay	39.28
2016	European Championships	Amsterdam, Netherlands	24th (sf)	100 m	12.13
2016	European Championships	Amsterdam, Netherlands	9th (h)	4 × 100 m relay	39.15
2017	European Indoor Championships	Belgrade, Serbia	17th (h)	60 m	6.79
2018	World Indoor Championships	Birmingham, United Kingdom	18th (sf)	60 m	6.67
2018	Mediterranean Games	Tarragona, Spain	6th	100 m	10.49
2018	Mediterranean Games	Tarragona, Spain	4th	4 × 100 m relay	39.52
2018	European Championships	Berlin, Germany	30th (h)	100 m	10.55
2018	European Championships	Berlin, Germany	9th (h)	4 × 100 m relay	39.12
2019	European Games	Minsk, Belarus	16th	100 m	10.78
2019	European Games	Minsk, Belarus	TBD	DNA Athletics	TBD
