= Ryan Scott (sprinter) =

British sprinter (born 1987)

Personal information
- Nationality: Great Britain
- Born: 22 February 1987 (age 39)

Sport
- Sport: Track and field
- Event: 100 metres
Medal record
Men's Athletics
Representing England
Commonwealth Games
Gold medal – first place	2010 Delhi	4 × 100 m relay

Ryan Scott (born 22 February 1987 in Bristol) is an English sprint runner from Henleaze who competes in the 100 metres.

His first international appearances for Great Britain came in 2007. He ran in the 60 metres at the 2007 European Athletics Indoor Championships, but was disqualified in the final while his running mates Jason Gardener and Craig Pickering took gold and silver. In the summer he entered the 100 m at the 2007 European Athletics U23 Championships and recorded a personal best of 10.28 seconds in the heats. He did not make the final, however, as he was fifth in the semis.

In 2008 he set two new personal bests, running 6.59 seconds over 60 m and recording a mark of 10.20 seconds for the 100 m. He was selected as a relay 4 × 100 metres relay runner for the 2009 European Athletics U23 Championships and he started off the British team (including Toby Sandeman, Rion Pierre and Leevan Yearwood) which went on to secure the gold medal.

He won a gold medal in the 2010 Commonwealth Games in the 4 × 100 m relay race held in Delhi, India in October 2010. It was first senior international medal. He competes domestically for Newham and Essex.
