= Ruslan Abbasov =

Azerbaijani sprinter (born 1986)

- Born: 24 June 1986 (age 39)
- Notable work: He represented Azerbaijan at the 2008 Summer Olympics in Beijing.

Ruslan Abbasov (born 24 June 1986) is a track and field sprint athlete who competes internationally for Azerbaijan.

Abbasov represented Azerbaijan at the 2008 Summer Olympics in Beijing. He competed at the 100 metres sprint and placed 5th in his heat without advancing to the second round. He ran the distance in a time of 10.58 seconds.
