= Manuel Reynaert =

French sprinter

Manuel Reynaert (born 5 June 1985 in Saint-Pol-sur-Mer, Nord) is a track and field sprint athlete who competes internationally for France.

Reynaert represented France at the 2008 Summer Olympics in Beijing. He competed at the 4 × 100 metres relay together with Martial Mbandjock, Yannick Lesourd and Samuel Coco-Viloin. In their qualification heat they placed sixth in a time of 39.53 seconds and they were eliminated.
