= Visa Hongisto =

Finnish sprinter (born 1987)

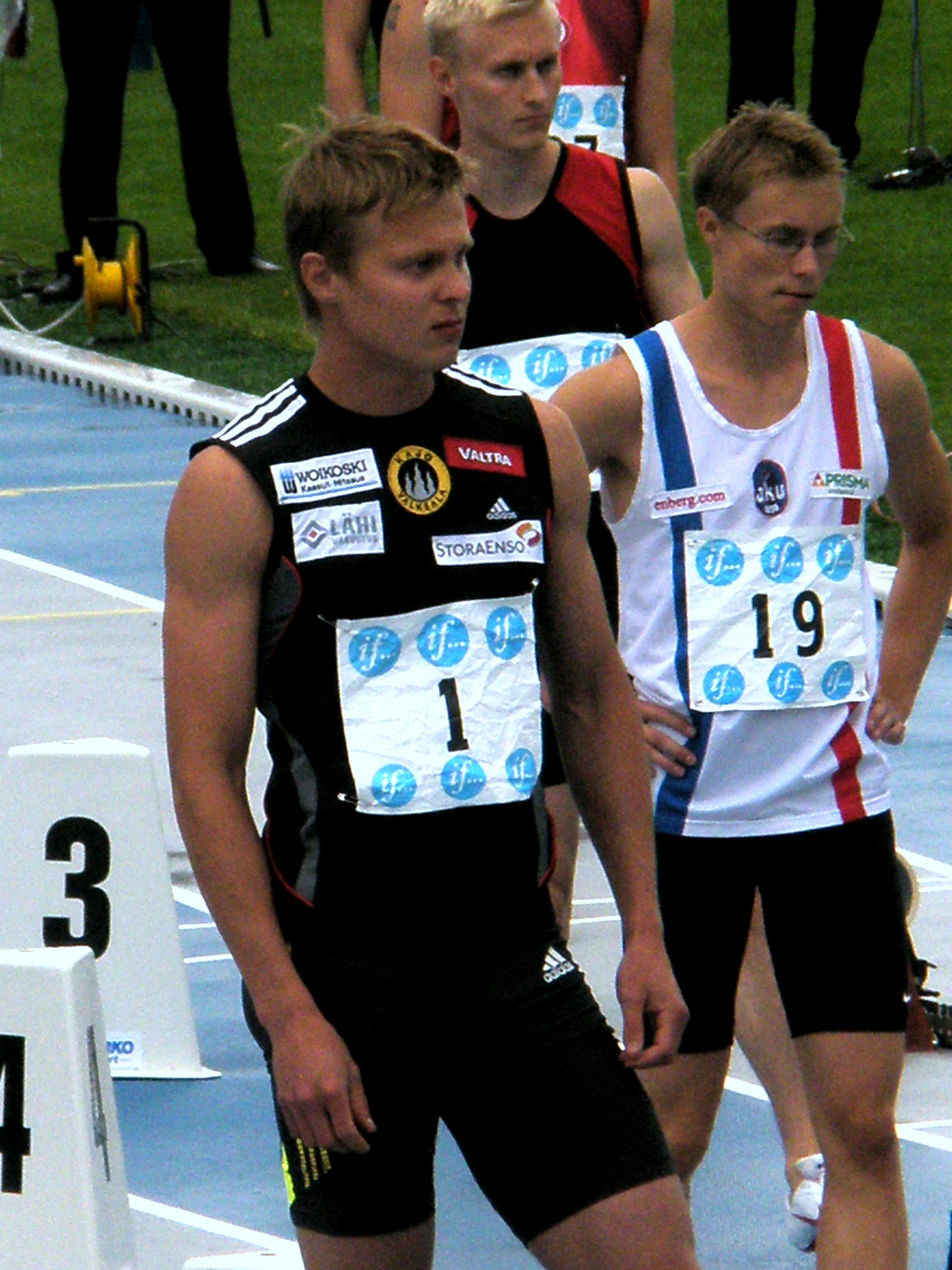
Visa Hongisto at the 2009 Finnish Championships in Athletics.

Visa Veli Hongisto (born 9 April 1987 in Valkeala) is a Finnish sprinter. His club team is Valkealan Kajo. He is the son of Eeva Haimi.

Hongisto represented Finland at the 2008 Summer Olympics in Beijing. He competed at the 200 metres and placed fourth in his first round heat in a time of 20.62 seconds. He did not improve his time in the second round and finished in 20.76 seconds, placing sixth, which was not enough to qualify for the semi-finals.

== Progression ==
=== 100m ===
Year	Time	Wind	City	Date
2002	11,51	-0.8	Iisalmi	17 August 2002
2003	10,94	-0.4	Paris, France	28 July 2003
2004	10,56	+0.5	Kotka	22 July 2004
2005	10,48	-0.8	Gothenburg, Sweden	27 August 2005
2006	10,45	+1.1	Tampere	7 June 2006

=== 200m ===
Year	Time	Wind	City	Date
2004	21,23	+1.6	Grosseto, Italy	15 July 2004
2005	21,05	+0.8	Gothenburg, Sweden	28 August 2005
2006	21,33	+0.0	Eurajoki	14 June 2006
2007	20,56	+0.2	Osaka, Japan	28 August 2007

=== 400m ===
Year	Time	City	Date
2008	47,02	Dessau, Germany	30 May 2008

== Personal bests ==
- 60m (indoor): 6,72 in Helsinki, 2006
- 100m: 10,45 in Tampere, 2006
- 200m: 20,56 in Osaka, 2007
- 400m: 47.02 in Dessau, 2008

== Physical characteristics ==
- Height: 184 cm
- Weight: 77 kg
