= James Ellington =

British sprinter (born 1985)

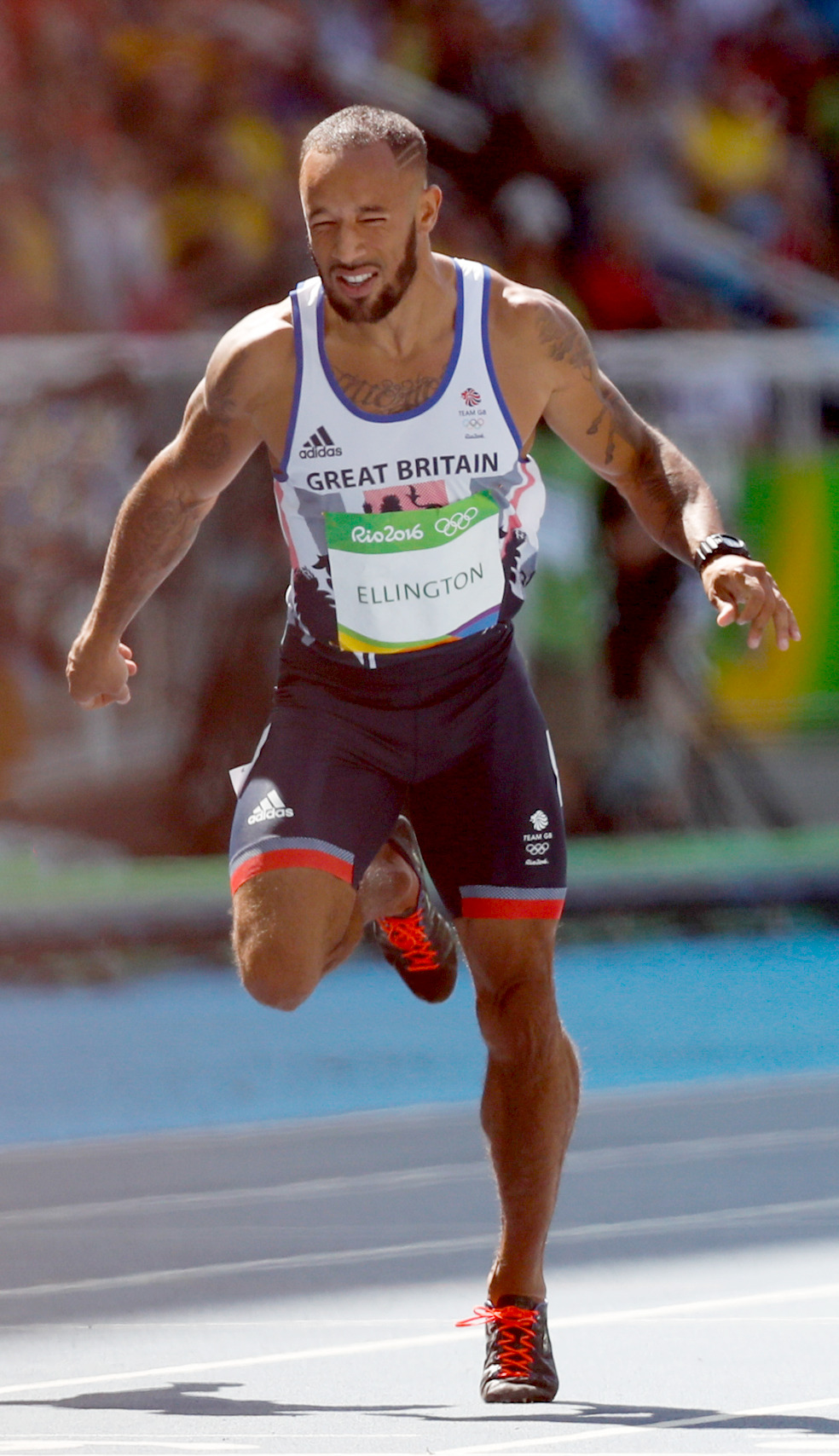
- Ellington at the 2016 Olympics

Personal information
- Nationality: British (English)
- Born: 6 September 1985 (age 40) Lewisham, London, England
- Height: 179 cm (5 ft 10 in)
- Weight: 81 kg (179 lb)

Sport
- Sport: Athletics
- Events: 100 metres, 200 metres
- Club: Newham and Essex Beagles

Achievements and titles
- Personal bests: 100 m 10.04 (+1.5 m/s)(Amsterdam European Championships); 200 m 20.31 (+1.2 m/s) (NTC/PURE Athletics Spring Invitational 2016)
Medal record
Representing Great Britain
European Championships
Gold medal – first place	2014 Zurich	4 × 100 m relay
Gold medal – first place	2016 Amsterdam	4 × 100 m relay
IAAF World Relays
Bronze medal – third place	2014 Bahamas	4 × 100 m relay
Representing England
Commonwealth Games
Silver medal – second place	2014 Glasgow	4 × 100 m relay

James Ellington (born 6 September 1985) is a British retired sprinter, who raced in the 100 metres and 200 metres. He represented his country twice at the Olympic Games (2012, 2016), is a two-time relay gold medallist with Great Britain at the European Athletics Championships (2014, 2016), a silver medallist at the 2014 Commonwealth Games with the England relay team, and is a three-time participant at the World Athletics Championships.

At national level, he won back-to-back titles in the 200 m at the British Athletics Championships from 2012 to 2013.

== Career ==
He made his world senior championship debut at the 2011 World Championships in Athletics in Daegu, running 20.82 in the 200 m and finishing 5th in his heat. James was in the Great Britain Olympic team for the 2012 Summer Olympics, running in the 200 metres. He finished fifth in his heat of the 200 metres and failed to progress. At the 2014 Commonwealth Games, he failed to reach the 200 m final, but was part of the England team that won the silver medal in men's 4 × 100 m, running in the heats. At the 2014 European Championships, he reached the semifinal in the men's 200 m, and was part of the Great Britain team that won the gold medal, running in the heat and final.

In November 2011 Ellington attracted widespread press coverage by selling his sponsorship rights on eBay in the run up to London 2012. The winning bid was £32,550, but the winning bidder was not genuine. Ellington eventually attracted sponsorship from skincare company King of Shaves, who offered to sponsor him if the eBay deal fell through.

== Accident ==
On 17 January 2017, Ellington was injured in a road accident alongside fellow sprinter Nigel Levine; the pair "were riding a motorbike when they were struck head on by a car travelling on the wrong side of the road". They were in Tenerife, Spain, undertaking warm-weather training with a group of British sprinters. Both athletes were admitted to hospital and were described on 18 January as "conscious and stable". The Guardian suggested that Ellington's injuries were "career ending" and stated that they consisted of "broken bones in his tibia and fibula and [he] is also believed to have fractured his pelvis". On 8 May 2024, Ellington received a six figure out-of-court settlement from a Spanish motor insurance company which had admitted liability in relation to the incident.
