= Yazaldes Nascimento =

Portuguese sprinter

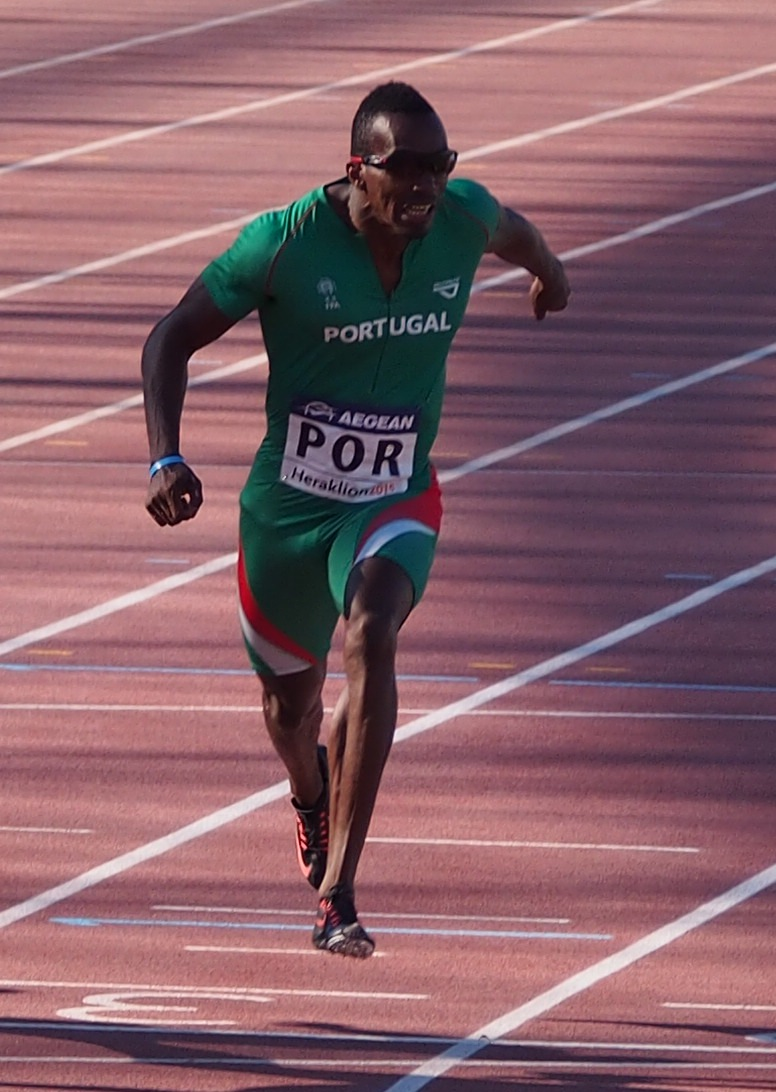
- Nascimento during 2015 European Team Championships First League

Personal information
- Full name: Yazaldes Valdemar Nascimento Alfonso
- National team: Portugal
- Born: 17 April 1986 (age 40) São Tomé and Príncipe
- Height: 1.84 m (6 ft 0 in)
- Weight: 77 kg (170 lb)

Sport
- Country: Portugal
- Sport: Athletics
- Event: Sprints
- Coached by: João Abrantes

Yazaldes Valdemar Nascimento Alfonso (born 17 April 1986) is a Portuguese athlete who specializes in the 100 metres.

Participating in the 2004 Summer Olympics, Nascimento achieved eighth place in his 100 m heat, thus missing out on a placing in Round 2 of the event. He did however achieve a personal best time with 11.00 seconds. He also competed at the 2005 World Championships.

Born in São Tomé and Príncipe, Nascimento became a Portuguese citizen on 12 June 2007. Before changing nationality he set the current São Tomé and Príncipe record in high jump with 1.98 m.

His personal best time in the 100 metres is 10.16, achieved in 2015 in Madrid.

Olympic Games
Preceded by Naide Gomes	Flagbearer for São Tomé and Príncipe; 2004 Athens	Succeeded by Celma Bonfim da Graça
