= Arnaldo Abrantes =

Portuguese sprinter (born 1986)

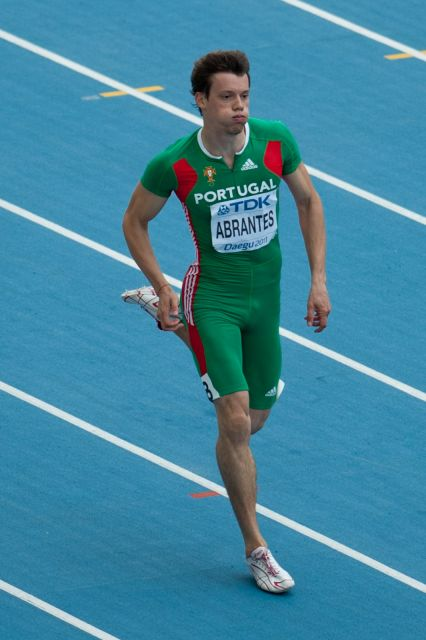

Personal information
- Nationality: Portuguese
- Born: 27 November 1986 (age 39) Cova da Piedade, Portugal

Sport
- Sport: Athletics
- Events: 100 metres, 200 metres

Achievements and titles
- Personal bests: 60 m: 6.65 100 m: 10.19 (+0.5 m/s) 200 m: 20.48 (+0.0 m/s)
Medal record
Men's athletics
Representing Portugal
Lusophony Games
Gold medal – first place	Lisboa 2009	200 m
Silver medal – second place	Macau 2006	200 m
European Athletics U23 Championships
Silver medal – second place	Debrecen 2007	4×100m relay

Arnaldo Luís Isaías Abrantes (born 7 November 1986) is a Portuguese track and field sprinter, specialising in the distances of 100 metres and 200 metres. He also competes in the 4×100 metres relay. His father, Arnaldo Abrantes, was also a sprinter.

Abrantes currently acts as Head of Performance at Premier League football side Arsenal

== Career ==
Born in Cova da Piedade, Abrantes began running at the Núcleo Desportivo Juvenil do Laranjeiro in 2002 where he remained until 2003. He joined Sporting Clube de Portugal in 2004, but left in 2010 (competing only for the Portuguese team).

At the 2007 Summer Universiade he managed a sixth place in the final 100 m, with a time of 10.53 seconds. He participated in the 2007 European Athletics U23 Championships in Debrecen and was a semi-finalist in both the 100 and 200 m, before going on to claim a silver medal in the relay with colleagues Dany Gonçalves, Ricardo Martins and Yazaldes Nascimento. At the Osaka 2007 World Athletics Championships, Abrantes reached the quarter-finals of the 200 m. As well as achieving the entry standard time for the Olympic Games 2008 he also beat his personal best and national under-23 record of 20.48 seconds.

He qualified to compete at the 2008 Summer Olympics, but was eliminated in the opening rounds. The following year he improved his 100 m personal best to 10.19 seconds (the third best time by a Portuguese sprinter ever). He achieved a second-place finish at the European Team Championships in the 200 metres, behind only to Dwain Chambers. At the Portuguese Championships he was runner-up to Francis Obikwelu with a wind-assisted run of 10.13 seconds. He was not in shape to compete in the 200 m at the 2009 World Championships in Athletics, but he did run in the national relay team.

== 2010 ==
He managed to reach the entry standard for the European Championships in Barcelona, the time being slightly above his personal best. He participated in the 200 metres reaching the semi-finals. In the 4x100 metre relay, along with fellow Ricardo Monteiro, Francis Obikwelu and João Ferreira, he beat the national record to 38.88 seconds. It was the first time a Portuguese team completed the relay race in under 39 seconds.

== 2011 ==
Having left Sporting Clube de Portugal, he began the 2010/2011 season as an individual athlete. Despite competing as individual, he surprised everyone at the National Indoor Championships by winning the 60 m race, beating fellow countryman Francis Obikwelu. Abrantes set a new personal best of 6.65 seconds.

At the 2011 European Athletics Indoor Championships in Paris, he qualified for the semi-finals with a time of 6.65 (matching his personal best), but did not make the final. He started the outdoor season on 15 May at the University National Championships, opening the season with a time 10.56 seconds. A week later, at the Meeting of Leiria, he won with a time of 10.54 seconds. In early June, he participated in the International Flanders Athletics Meeting in Belgium. In the 100 metres he lined up against the then world champion in the 60 metres Dwain Chambers, taking second place with 10.70 seconds. Chambers finished the race in 10.27 seconds – a heavy headwind of -2.3 m/s affected the race. Later in the same meeting, Abrantes won the 200 metres in 20.90 seconds.

On 3 July, Arnaldo Abrantes participated in the Meeting of Chaux de Fonds in the 200 metres finishing second with 20.61 seconds (wind: +0.8 m / s). This result achieved the entry standard for the 2011 World Championships in Athletics in Daegu and 2012 Olympic Games in London.

== Personal bests ==
Event	Time (sec)	Venue	Date
60 metres	6.65	Paris, France	5 March 2011
60 metres hurdles	8.11	Alpiarça, Portugal	22 January 2006
100 metres	10.19	Salamanca, Spain	8 July 2008
110 metres hurdles	13.74	Paris, France	29 July 2003
200 metres	20.48	Osaka, Japan	28 August 2007
300 metres	33.70	Ghent, Belgium	2 February 2013

- All information taken from IAAF profile, except 300 metres record.

== Competition performances ==
- National Championships
  - 1st place Outdoor National Championship 2007 100 m - 10.33
  - 1st place Outdoor National Championship 2004 200 m - 21.63
  - 1st place Indoor National Championship 2009 60 m - 6.72
  - 1st place Indoor National Championship 2011 60 m - 6.65
- Olympic Games
  - Beijing 2008, 200 m (Heats - 21.46)
- World Championships
  - Berlin 2009, 100 m (Heats - 10.41 / Quarter Final - 10.40)
  - Osaka 2007, 200 m (Heats - 20.48 / Quarter Final - 20.82)
- European Championships
  - Barcelona 2010, 200 m (Heats - 20.87 / Quarter Final - 20.88)
  - Barcelona 2010, 4 × 100 m (Heats - 39.30 / Final (6th) - 38.88)
- European Indoor Championships
  - Turin 2009, 60 m (Heats - 6.78)
  - Paris 2011, 60 m (Heats - 6.65 / Semi-Final - 6.66)
- World Junior Championships
  - Grosseto 2004, 100 m (Heats - 10.93)
- Lusophony Games
  - Macau 2006, 200 m (Final (2nd) - 21.92)
  - Lisbon 2009, 200 m (Final (1st) - 20.64)
- Universiade
  - Bangkok 2007, 100 m 7th place
