= Craig Pickering =

English sprinter and bobsleigher (born 1986)

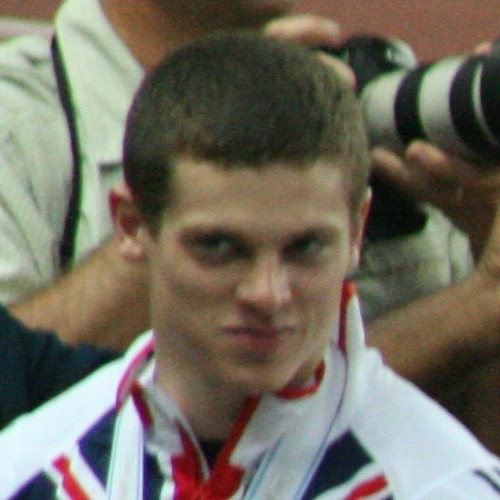

Personal information
- Nationality: British (English)
- Born: 16 October 1986 (age 39) Crawley, England
- Height: 184 cm (6 ft 0 in)
- Weight: 84 kg (185 lb)

Sport
- Sport: Athletics
- Event: Sprints
- Club: Milton Keynes AC
Medal record
Representing Great Britain
Men’s athletics
World Championships
Bronze medal – third place	2007 Osaka	4x100 m relay
World Youth Championships
Bronze medal – third place	2003 Sherbrooke	100 m
European Indoor Championships
Silver medal – second place	2007 Birmingham	60 m

Craig Keith Pickering (born 16 October 1986) is an English retired sprinter and bobsleigher. He competed at the 2008 Summer Olympics.

== Biography ==
=== Early life ===
Pickering was born in Crawley, West Sussex to parents probation officer Linda Pickering and accountant David Pickering. He has two younger siblings Luke Pickering and Lauren Pickering. Pickering is a former student of the Royal Latin School and got pointed in the sprinting direction by his P.E teacher Adam Izzard.

=== Athletics ===
As a sprinter, he was based at the Marshall Milton Keynes Athletics Club; however, he also ran for the University of Bath and Newham and Essex Beagles. Pickering had success as a youth athlete, winning the bronze medal in the 100m at the 2003 World Youth Championships in Athletics. He first came into the public eye in June 2005, when he beat Darren Campbell in the 100 m at a meet in Bedford. During 2007, he has found success on the indoor circuit, winning the 60m event at the European Indoor Trials and UK Championships in Sheffield in early February, following this with a second-place finish in the Norwich Union Grand Prix in Birmingham in the same event, behind his Bath team-mate Jason Gardener. His indoor form prompted The Scotsman to hint in January 2007 that Pickering could be a gold-medal prospect for the London Olympics.

More recently, he won the silver medal, again in the 60 m event, at the 2007 European Athletics Indoor Championships in Birmingham. He is currently regarded as a hot contender for the British number one spot, having soundly beaten Mark Lewis-Francis among others at the Glasgow Norwich Union Grand Prix held on 3 June 2007. Despite dismal rainy conditions, Pickering equalled his personal best of 10.22 sec.

On 23 June 2007 he achieved a new personal best of 10.15 sec to win the men's 100 m at the 2007 European Cup in Munich. He also participated to the British Relay 4x100 win, with 38.30 (World Leading Time of 2007).

Pickering soon followed this up with a new personal best (10.14) and a silver medal at the 2007 European Under 23 Championships (Debrecen, Hungary), behind compatriot Simeon Williamson.

At the 2007 UK Championships and World Trials, Pickering finished second (by 0.01) behind Marlon Devonish, and was then selected to compete at the 2007 World Championships, in the 100 m. He also was part of the 4 × 100 m relay team which won the bronze medal.

He opened his 2008 season with a win at the Norwich Union international match in the 60 m, securing a win for Great Britain, in the international match.

Pickering was GBs solo qualifier to the 100m final at the 2008 Aviva London Grand Prix, Crystal Palace, finishing 8th.

3 August 2008 Craig and Simeon were featured in a BBC documentary called Sprint along with other 100m hopefuls Harry Aikines-Aryeetey and Wade Bennett-Jackson.

In the Beijing Olympics of 2008 Pickering started his run too early when running the last leg of Great Britain's 4 × 100 m relay team. As a result, the baton was not passed properly and the team were disqualified. Pickering took full responsibility.

Pickering missed the London 2012 Olympics after back surgery and lost his UK Athletics funding in October of the same year.

=== Bobsleigh ===
Following this it was announced on 7 December 2012 that Pickering would join the GB Bobsleigh team, with the aim of making the 2014 Winter Olympics. He finished 19th, with pilot John Jackson, on his World Cup debut in the two-man bobsleigh, earning selection to the GB Bobsleigh World Championship squad. However Pickering was forced to withdraw from the British bobsleigh squad for the Sochi Olympics due to a back injury.

=== Personal life ===
Pickering married medical doctor Susan Roberts on 7 June 2016. They currently reside in Gold Coast, Australia. On 11 March 2021, Pickering's wife gave birth to their first child, a daughter named Isla. Following his retirement from professional sport, he became an academic researcher and gained a professional doctorate in sports performance from the University of Central Lancashire. He relocated to Australia in 2015 and currently works as director of performance sustainability at Athletics Australia.

=== Competition record ===
European Indoor Championships, 60m – Silver (2007)
European U23 Championships, 100m – Silver (2007)
European Cup, 100m – Gold (2007)
World Championships, 4 × 100 m – Bronze (2007)
World Championships, 100m – 11th (2007)
AAAs Under-23 Championships, 100m – Gold (2006)
European Junior Championships, 100m – Gold (2005)
World Junior Championships, 100m – Bronze (2003)

=== Personal bests ===
Event	Best	Location	Date
60 metres	6.55 s	Glasgow, Scotland	27 January 2007
100 metres	10.14 s	Debrecen, Hungary	13 Jul 2007
100 metres	10.08 s (wind-aided +2.1 m/s)	Ostrava, Czech Republic	17 June 2009
200 metres	20.89 s	Loughborough, England	23 May 2010
