= 2010 European Team Championships Super League =

Athletics team competitions

- Host city: (Norway) Bergen
- Nations: 12
- Events: 40 (20 men, 20 women)
- Dates: 19–20 June 2010
- Main venue: Fana Stadion

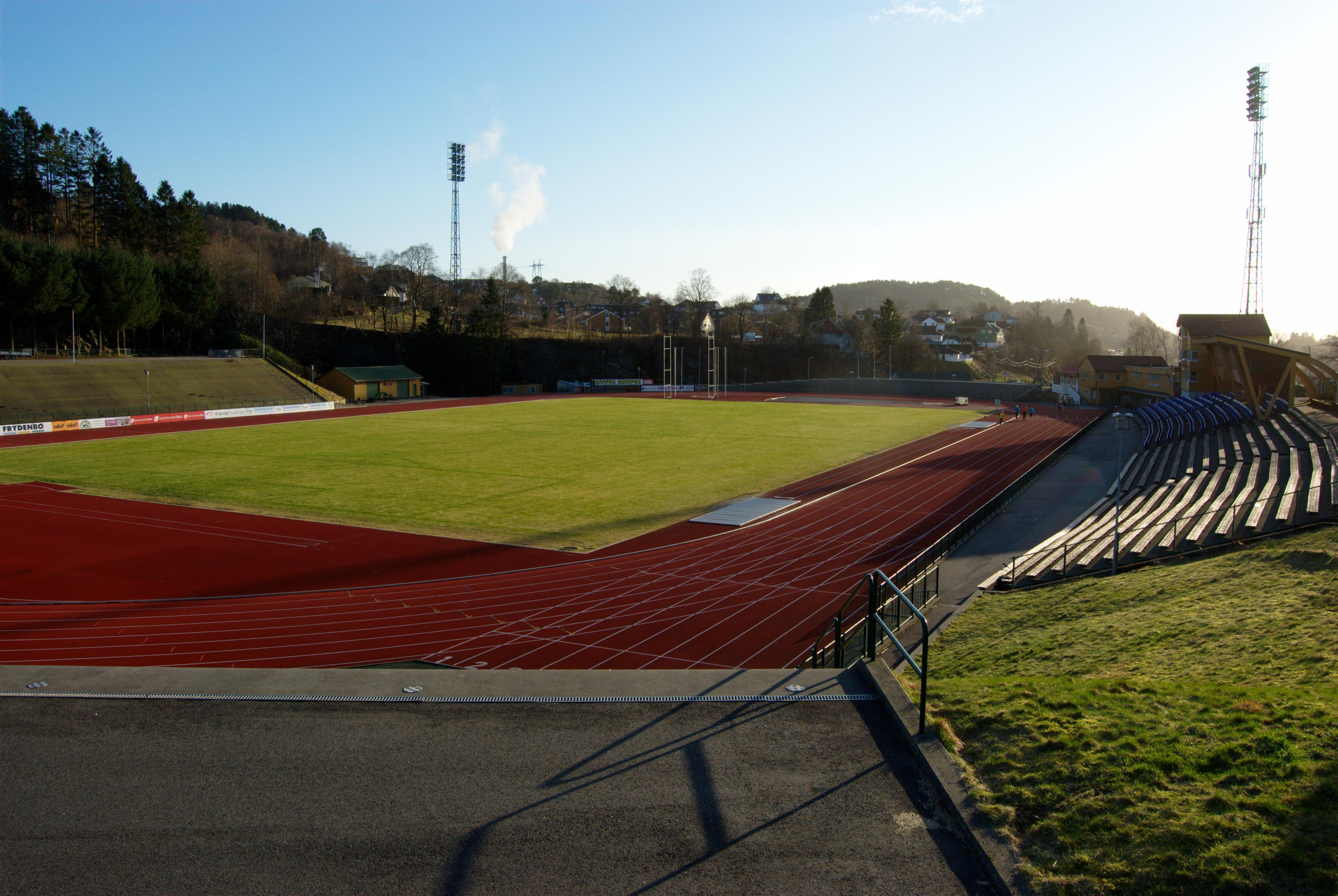
The event was held at Fana Stadion

The 2010 European Team Championships Super League was the Super League of the 2nd edition of the European Team Championships (European Athletics Team Championships from 2013 edition), the 2010 European Team Championships, which took place on 19 and 20 June 2010 in Bergen, Norway. As with the previous championships there were a couple of rules applying specifically to this competition, such as the limit of three attempts in the throwing events, long jump and triple jump (only the top four were allowed the fourth attempt) and the limit of four misses total in the high jump and pole vault.

== Final standings ==
Pos	Country	Pts
1	Russia	368.5
2	Great Britain	318.5
3	Germany	307
4	France	291
5	Ukraine	287
6	Italy	284.5
7	Poland	278
8	Belarus	236.5
9	Spain	220
10	Greece	189
11	Norway	177
12	Finland	152

== Men ==
=== 100 metres ===
Wind:
Heat A: +1.1 m/s
Heat B: +2.1 m/s

Rank	Heat	Lane	Name	Nationality	React	Time	Notes	Points
1	A	5	Dwain Chambers	Great Britain	0.162	9.99	CR, EL	12
2	A	6	Christophe Lemaître	France	0.195	10.02	PB	11
3	A	4	Emanuele Di Gregorio	Italy	0.182	10.20	PB	10
4	A	3	Ángel David Rodríguez	Spain	0.155	10.23	SB	9
5	B	6	Andrey Yepishin	Russia	0.150	10.40		8
6	B	5	Aliaksandr Linnik	Belarus	0.172	10.44		7
7	A	7	Paweł Stempel	Poland	0.219	10.48		6
8	B	2	Serhiy Smelyk	Ukraine	0.177	10.57		5
9	B	3	Hannu Hämäläinen	Finland	0.157	10.64		4
10	B	7	Tormod Larsen	Norway	0.163	10.71		3
11	B	4	Ággelos Aggelákis	Greece	0.245	10.82		2
	A	2	Martin Keller	Germany		DQ	R 162.7	0

=== 200 metres ===
Wind:
Heat A: +0.4 m/s
Heat B: +1.0 m/s

Rank	Heat	Lane	Name	Nationality	React	Time	Notes	Points
1	A	6	Martial Mbandjock	France	0.159	20.55	=CR	12
2	A	7	Likoúrgos-Stéfanos Tsákonas	Greece	0.167	20.69	PB	11
3	A	3	Sebastian Ernst	Germany	0.151	20.77	SB	10
4	A	5	Igor Bodrov	Ukraine	0.229	20.77	SB	9
5	A	4	Leon Baptiste	Great Britain	0.169	20.84		8
6	A	2	Kamil Kryński	Poland	0.179	20.89		7
7	B	4	Jonathan Åstrand	Finland	0.163	20.92	PB	6
8	B	3	Roberto Donati	Italy	0.190	21.01	SB	5
9	B	2	Ángel David Rodríguez	Spain	0.174	21.11		4
10	B	6	Aliaksandr Linnik	Belarus	0.225	21.15		3
11	B	5	Roman Smirnov	Russia	0.178	21.37		2
12	B	7	Per Magnus Solli	Norway	0.255	21.68		1

=== 400 metres ===
Rank	Heat	Lane	Name	Nationality	React	Time	Notes	Points
1	A	4	Martyn Rooney	Great Britain	0.214	45.67		12
2	A	2	Leslie Djhone	France	0.167	45.72	SB	11
3	A	6	Vladimir Krasnov	Russia	0.229	45.74		10
4	B	5	Dimítrios Grávalos	Greece	0.183	46.35	SB	9
5	A	7	Thomas Schneider	Germany	0.345	46.36		8
6	A	3	Andrea BarberI	Italy	0.167	46.62		7
7	A	5	Piotr Klimczak	Poland	0.208	47.00		6
8	B	6	Volodymyr Burakov	Ukraine	0.246	47.18		5
9	B	7	Matti Välimäki	Finland	0.176	47.29	=SB	4
10	B	4	Mark Ujakpor	Spain	0.173	47.78		3
11	B	2	Lars Jahr Røine	Norway	0.185	48.19		2
12	B	3	Dzmitry Paluyan	Belarus	0.265	48.38		1

=== 800 metres ===
Rank	Name	Nationality	Time	Notes	Points
1	Yuriy Borzakovskiy	Russia	1:45.41	CR	12
2	Michael Rimmer	Great Britain	1:45.62		11
3	Marcin Lewandowski	Poland	1:45.74		10
4	Robin Schembera	Germany	1:46.38	SB	9
5	Antonio Manuel Reina	Spain	1:46.55		8
6	Anis Ananenka	Belarus	1:47.66	PB	7
7	Hamid Oualich	France	1:48.07		6
8	Giordano Benedetti	Italy	1:48.50		5
9	Vitaliy Voloshyn	Ukraine	1:48.63		4
10	Thomas Roth	Norway	1:48.82		3
11	Tommy Granlund	Finland	1:49.16	SB	2
12	Konstadínos Nakópoulos	Greece	1:49.61	SB	1

=== 1500 metres ===
Rank	Name	Nationality	Time	Notes	Points
1	Colin McCourt	Great Britain	3:46.70		12
2	Christian Obrist	Italy	3:46.77		11
3	Carsten Schlangen	Germany	3:46.89		10
4	Mateusz Demczyszak	Poland	3:47.16		9
5	Oleksandr Borysyuk	Ukraine	3:47.22		8
6	Henrik Ingebrigtsen	Norway	3:47.40		7
7	Niclas Sandells	Finland	3:47.48		6
8	Ivan Tukhtachev	Russia	3:47.79		5
9	Diego Ruíz	Spain	3:47.84		4
10	Yoann Kowal	France	3:48.47		3
11	Siarhei Chabiarak	Belarus	3:50.03		2
12	Andréas Dimitrákis	Greece	3:58.66		1

=== 3000 metres ===
Rank	Name	Nationality	Time	Notes	Points
1	Jesús España	Spain	8:19.39		12
2	Mykola Labovskyy	Ukraine	8:20.01		11
3	Valentin Smirnov	Russia	8:20.11		10
4	Yohan Durand	France	8:20.14		9
5	Bartosz Nowicki	Poland	8:20.16		8
6	Stefano La Rosa	Italy	8:20.39		7
7	Arne Gabius	Germany	8:20.99		6
8	Siarhei Platonau	Belarus	8:21.31		5
9	Mikael Bergdahl	Finland	8:21.91		4
10	Sindre Buraas	Norway	8:25.34		3
11	James Wilkinson	Great Britain	8:28.33		2
12	Konstantinos Touche	Greece	8:32.36		1

=== 5000 metres ===
Rank	Name	Nationality	Time	Notes	Points
1	Mo Farah	Great Britain	13:46.93		12
2	Alemayehu Bezabeh	Spain	13:49.24		11
3	Serhiy Lebid	Ukraine	13:49.90		10
4	Yevgeniy Rybakov	Russia	13:55.04	PB	9
5	Daniele Meucci	Italy	13:56.95	SB	8
6	Matti Räsänen	Finland	13:58.40		7
7	Sondre Nordstad Moen	Norway	14:00.03	PB	6
8	Radosław Kłeczek	Poland	14:01.41		5
9	Abdellatif Meftah	France	14:06.10		4
10	Stsiapan Rahautsou	Belarus	14:08.55		3
11	Christian Glatting	Germany	14:09.78		2
12	Adónios Papadónis	Greece	14:45.05		1

=== 3000 metres steeplechase ===
Rank	Name	Nationality	Time	Notes	Points
1	Tomasz Szymkowiak	Poland	8:31.53		12
2	Steffen Uliczka	Germany	8:33.39		11
3	Jukka Keskisalo	Finland	8:33.41		10
4	José Luis Blanco	Spain	8:36.15		9
5	Luke Gunn	Great Britain	8:38.65		8
6	Vincent Zouaoui Dandrieux	France	8:39.38		7
7	Matteo Villani	Italy	8:39.72		6
~~8~~	Ildar Minshin	Russia	~~8:44.38~~	DQ (doping)	0
8	Bjørnar Ustad Kristensen	Norway	8:44.55		5
9	Ilya Slavenski	Belarus	8:44.68		4
10	Theódoros Anagnóstou	Greece	9:06.40		3
	Vadym Slobodenyuk	Ukraine	DQ	R 163.3	0

=== 110 metres hurdles ===
Wind:
Heat A: -0.1 m/s
Heat B: -0.5 m/s

Rank	Heat	Lane	Name	Nationality	React	Time	Notes	Points
1	A	4	Andy Turner	Great Britain	0.144	13.48		12
2	A	6	Artur Noga	Poland	0.162	13.54		11
3	A	3	Jackson Quiñónez	Spain	0.169	13.67		10
4	B	7	Maksim Lynsha	Belarus	0.212	13.70		9
5	A	5	Konstadínos Douvalídis	Greece	0.164	13.74		8
6	B	6	Stefano Tedesco	Italy	0.175	13.78		7
7	A	7	Alexander John	Germany	0.165	13.79		6
8	B	4	Yevgeniy Borisov	Russia	0.160	13.82		4.5
8	A	2	Cédric Lavanne	France	0.149	13.82		4.5
10	B	3	Juha Sonck	Finland	0.130	13.97		3
11	B	5	Serhiy Demydyuk	Ukraine	0.162	14.06		2
12	B	2	Vladimir Vukicevic	Norway	0.150	14.13	PB	1

=== 400 metres hurdles ===
Rank	Heat	Lane	Name	Nationality	React	Time	Notes	Points
1	A	5	Dai Greene	Great Britain	0.166	49.53		12
2	A	2	Periklís Iakovákis	Greece	0.198	50.13	SB	11
3	A	7	Aleksandr Derevyagin	Russia	0.188	50.20		10
4	A	6	Stanislav Melnykov	Ukraine	0.273	50.48		9
5	A	4	Sébastien Maillard	France	0.260	51.14		8
6	A	3	Silvio Schirrmeister	Germany	0.232	51.16		7
7	B	6	Gianni Carabelli	Italy	0.174	51.21		6
8	B	5	Siarhei Serkou	Belarus	0.196	51.37		5
9	B	2	Rafał Omelko	Poland	0.190	52.70		4
10	B	3	Andreas Totsås	Norway	0.174	52.96		3
	B	4	Jussi Heikkilä	Finland		DNS		0
	B	7	Ignacio Sarmiento	Spain		DNS		0

=== 4 × 100 metres relay ===
Rank	Heat	Lane	Name	Nationality	Time	Note	Points
1	A	4	Roberto Donati, Simone Collio, Emanuele Di Gregorio, Maurizio Checcucci	Italy	38.83		12
2	A	5	Jeffrey Lawal-Balogun, Craig Pickering, Marlon Devonish, Tyrone Edgar	Great Britain	39.00		11
3	B	6	Christian Blum, Till Helmke, Alexander Kosenkow, Martin Keller	Germany	39.07		10
4	A	2	Robert Kubaczyk, Paweł Stempel, Kamil Masztak, Kamil Kryński	Poland	39.09		9
5	A	6	Aleksandr Brednev, Ivan Teplykh, Roman Smirnov, Andrey Yepishin	Russia	39.32		8
6	A	7	Igor Bodrov, Kostyantyn Vasyukov, Vitaliy Korzh, Serhiy Sahutkin	Ukraine	39.52		7
7	B	7	Iván Mocholí, Ángel David Rodríguez, Orkatz Beitia, Daniel Molowny	Spain	40.04		6
8	B	2	Hannu Ali-Huokuna, Joni Rautanen, Jonathan Åstrand, Hannu Hämäläinen	Finland	40.06		5
9	B	4	Efthímios Steryioúlis, Likoúrgos-Stéfanos Tsákonas, Yeóryios Koutsotheodórou, Ággelos Aggelákis	Greece	40.30		4
10	B	5	Yury Melnikau, Aliaksandr Linnik, Yury Bahdanovich, Ivan Dymar	Belarus	40.71		3
11	B	3	Simon Rønsholm Sandvik, Alexander Karlsson, Tormod Larsen, Christian Mogstad	Norway	40.87		2
	A	3	Jimmy Vicaut, Ronald Pognon, Emmanuel Biron, Martial Mbandjock	France	DNF		0

=== 4 × 400 metres relay ===
Rank	Heat	Lane	Name	Nationality	Time	Note	Points
1	A	4	Maksim Dyldin, Valentin Kruglyakov, Pavel Trenikhin, Vladimir Krasnov	Russia	3:01.72	EL	12
2	A	5	Conrad Williams, Richard Buck, Chris Clarke, Michael Bingham	Great Britain	3:03.50		11
3	A	7	Dmytro Ostrovskyy, Stanislav Melnykov, Myhaylo Knysh, Volodymyr Burakov	Ukraine	3:04.21		10
4	A	3	Barberi Andrea, Luca Galletti, Domenico Fontana, Claudio Licciardello	Italy	3:04.52		9
5	A	2	Marcin Marciniszyn, Daniel Dąbrowski, Kacper Kozłowski, Piotr Klimczak	Poland	3:04.52		8
6	B	6	Marco Kaiser, Jonas Plass, Niklas Zender, Thomas Schneider	Germany	3:04.90		7
7	A	6	Mathieu Lahaye, Youness Gurachi, Sébastien Maillard, Teddy Venel	France	3:04.96		6
8	B	2	Dimitrios Gravalos, Petros Kypiakidis, Padeleímon Melahrinoúdis, Periklís Iakovákis	Greece	3:06.38		5
9	B	5	Marc Orozco, Mark Ujakpor, Adrián González, Antonio Manuel Reina	Spain	3:09.37		4
10	B	4	Dzmitry Paluyan, Mikhail Ratnikau, Aliaksandr Patsyenka, Siarhei Siarkou	Belarus	3:11.24		3
11	B	7	Lars Jahr Røine, Thomas Roth, Carl Emil Kåshagen, Mauritz Kåshagen	Norway	3:12.71		2
12	B	3	Antti Toivonen, Gustav Klingstedt, Tommy Granlund, Matti Välimäki	Finland	3:12.74		1

=== High jump ===
Rank	Name	Nationality	2.10	2.14	2.18	2.22	2.25	2.28	2.30	2.32	2.34	Mark	Note	Points
1	Aleksandr Shustov	Russia	–	o	o	o	o	xo	x-	x-	x	2.28		12
2	Tom Parsons	Great Britain	o	o	o	o	xxo	x-	x			2.25		11
3	Andriy Protsenko	Ukraine	o	o	o	o	xxx					2.22		10
4	Fabrice Saint-Jean	France	o	o	o	xo	xxx					2.22		9
5	Konstadínos Baniótis	Greece	o	o	xo	xo	xx					2.22		7.5
5	Giulio Ciotti	Italy	o	xo	o	xo	xx					2.22	SB	7.5
7	Javier Bermejo	Spain	o	o	xo	xxo						2.22		6
8	Sylwester Bednarek	Poland	o	o	o	xxx						2.18		4.5
8	Artsiom Zaitsau	Belarus	o	o	o	xxx						2.18		4.5
10	Raúl Spank	Germany	–	o	xo	xxx						2.18		3
11	Niko Kyyhkynen	Finland	o	xxo	xo	x						2.18	SB	2
12	Brede Raa Ellingsen	Norway	xo	xxo	x							2.14		1

=== Pole vault ===
Rank	Name	Nationality	4.50	4.80	5.05	5.25	5.40	5.50	5.60	5.65	5.70	5.80	Mark	Note	Points
1	Renaud Lavillenie	France	–	–	–	–	o	–	o	–	xxo	xxx	5.70		12
2	Przemysław Czerwiński	Poland	–	–	–	o	o	–	o	–	xxx		5.60		11
3	Giuseppe Gibilisco	Italy	–	–	–	–	o	–	xxo				5.60		10
4	Konstadínos Filippídis	Greece	–	–	o	o	x-	o	xxx				5.50	=SB	9
5	Tobias Scherbarth	Germany	–	–	–	o	–	xo					5.50		8
6	Aleksandr Gripich	Russia	–	–	o	o	o	xxx					5.40		7
7	Igor Bychkov	Spain	–	–	xxo	o	xo	x					5.40		6
8	Maksym Mazuryk	Ukraine	–	–	–	xo	x-	xx					5.25		5
9	Matti Mononen	Finland	–	–	–	xxo	x						5.25		4
10	Igor Alekseev	Belarus	–	–	xo	xxx							5.05		3
11	Henning Dahl Holti	Norway	o	o	xxx								4.80		2
	Steven Lewis	Great Britain	–	–	–	xxx							NM		0

=== Long jump ===
Rank	Name	Nationality	#1	#2	#3	#4	Mark	Notes	Points
1	Pavel Shalin	Russia	7.75	7.68	8.26w	7.37	8.26w		12
2	Kafétien Gomis	France	7.88	7.82w	x	8.09	8.09	CR	11
3	Chris Tomlinson	Great Britain	7.98	x	7.88w	7.15	7.98		10
4	Mikko Kivinen	Finland	7.84w	7.55w	7.80	7.62w	7.84w		9
5	Eusebio Cáceres	Spain	7.81	7.48	7.58		7.81	SB	8
6	Christian Reif	Germany	x	7.54	7.80		7.80		7
7	Mihaíl Mertzanídis-Despotéris	Greece	7.35	7.52	7.71w		7.71w		6
8	Krzysztof Lewandowski	Poland	x	7.53	7.13		7.53		5
9	Emanuele Formichetti	Italy	7.20	7.38	7.47		7.47		4
10	Vetle Utsi Onstad	Norway	7.33w	7.28	x		7.33w		3
11	Maksym Moskalenko	Ukraine	x	7.18w	x		7.18w		2
12	Dzmitry Astrouski	Belarus	x	7.08	6.64w		7.08		1

=== Triple jump ===
Rank	Name	Nationality	#1	#2	#3	#4	Mark	Notes	Points
1	Viktor Kuznyetsov	Ukraine	17.26	16.96	16.72	x	17.26	PB	12
2	Phillips Idowu	Great Britain	17.07	16.32	17.12	x	17.12		11
3	Teddy Tamgho	France	x	17.10	17.10	16.96	17.10		10
4	Fabrizio Donato	Italy	16.33	16.81	x	x	16.81		9
5	Aleksey Fyodorov	Russia	16.60	16.60	16.19		16.60		8
6	Dzmitry Platnitski	Belarus	16.44	16.21	16.54		16.54		7
7	Dimítrios Tsiámis	Greece	15.55	16.22	16.20		16.22		6
8	Adrian Świderski	Poland	15.33	16.12	15.92		16.12		5
9	Andrés Capellán	Spain	16.07w	15.71	15.87		16.07w		4
10	Andreas Pohle	Germany	15.96	x	15.90		15.96		3
11	Aleksi Tammentie	Finland	15.89	x	15.80		15.89	SB	2
12	Sindre Almsengen	Norway	15.05	15.34	14.29		15.34	SB	1

=== Shot put ===
Rank	Name	Nationality	#1	#2	#3	#4	Mark	Notes	Points
1	Tomasz Majewski	Poland	x	19.90	20.63	x	20.63		12
2	Ralf Bartels	Germany	x	20.08	20.23	20.61	20.61		11
3	Yves Niaré	France	19.65	20.35	x	x	20.35		10
4	Pavel Lyzhyn	Belarus	x	19.97	x	x	19.97		9
5	Carl Myerscough	Great Britain	x	19.91	19.29		19.91		8
6	Pavel Sofin	Russia	19.55	19.42	x		19.55		7
7	Andriy Semenov	Ukraine	19.38	x	19.29		19.38		6
8	Borja Vivas	Spain	19.21	18.85	19.02		19.21		5
9	Mihaíl Stamatóyiannis	Greece	18.20	18.83	x		18.83		4
10	Marco Dodoni	Italy	17.70	18.00	18.36		18.36		3
11	Robert Häggblom	Finland	x	18.20	x		18.20		2
12	Stian Andersen	Norway	16.91	x	16.58		16.91		1

=== Discus throw ===
Rank	Name	Nationality	#1	#2	#3	#4	Mark	Notes	Points
1	Robert Harting	Germany	64.25	64.75	66.80	64.88	66.80	CR	12
2	Piotr Małachowski	Poland	65.55	64.07	64.67	x	65.55		11
3	Bogdan Pishchalnikov	Russia	60.55	63.72	x	63.72	63.72		10
4	Frank Casañas	Spain	62.12	61.71	60.36	62.62	62.62		9
5	Dzmitry Sivakou	Belarus	x	x	59.30		59.30		8
6	Ivan Hryshyn	Ukraine	58.94	57.16	57.72		58.94		7
7	Mikko Kyyrö	Finland	58.89	57.16	57.72		58.89		6
8	Jean-François Aurokiom	France	53.66	52.58	58.56		58.56		5
9	Spirídon Arabatzís	Greece	53.66	52.58	56.21		56.21		4
10	Marco Zitelli	Italy	55.67	54.42	x		55.67		3
11	Brett Morse	Great Britain	51.35	54.39	55.09		55.09		2
	Gaute Myklebust	Norway	x	x	x		NM		0

=== Hammer throw ===
Rank	Name	Nationality	#1	#2	#3	#4	Mark	Notes	Points
1	Pavel Kryvitski	Belarus	x	71.01	77.79	x	77.79		12
2	Nicola Vizzoni	Italy	74.46	72.14	75.70	77.54	77.54		11
3	Markus Esser	Germany	74.00	74.05	75.79	x	75.79		10
4	Nicolas Figère	France	70.04	74.76	x	72.41	74.76		9
5	Wojciech Kondratowicz	Poland	x	73.77	x		73.77		8
6	Olli-Pekka Karjalainen	Finland	72.30	71.65	71.86		72.30		7
7	Igor Vinichenko	Russia	71.81	x	71.85		71.85		6
8	Eivind Henriksen	Norway	71.11	68.94	69.76		71.11	PB	5
9	Stamátios Papadoníou	Greece	69.94	70.93	x		70.93		4
10	Artem Rubanko	Ukraine	68.72	x	67.51		68.72		3
11	Alex Smith	Great Britain	66.23	x	66.72		66.72		2
12	Javier Cienfuegos	Spain	64.05	64.75	x		64.75		1

=== Javelin throw ===
Rank	Name	Nationality	#1	#2	#3	#4	Mark	Notes	Points
1	Matthias de Zordo	Germany	77.86	83.80	80.51	82.49	83.80	CR	12
2	Andreas Thorkildsen	Norway	80.98	82.98	81.90	80.59	82.98		11
3	Ari Mannio	Finland	79.44	81.71	x	79.91	81.71		10
4	Oleksandr Pyatnytsya	Ukraine	75.28	78.75	77.49	76.98	78.75		9
5	Ilya Korotkov	Russia	77.56	x	x		77.56		8
6	Uladzimir Kazlou	Belarus	70.90	77.15	x		77.15		7
7	Igor Janik	Poland	72.35	76.47	76.08		76.47		6
8	Mervyn Luckwell	Great Britain	64.25	68.86	71.80		71.80		5
9	Spirídon Lebésis	Greece	71.79	x	x		71.79		4
10	Gianluca Tamberi	Italy	71.29	65.73	66.68		71.29		3
11	Rafael Baraza	Spain	66.29	x	63.04		66.29		2
12	Berenguer Demerval	France	x	62.71		64.12	64.12		1

== Women ==
=== 100 metres ===
Wind:
Heat A: +2.4 m/s
Heat B: +1.3 m/s

Rank	Heat	Lane	Name	Nationality	React	Time	Notes	Points
1	A	7	Véronique Mang	France	0.194	11.23		12
2	A	4	Ezinne Okparaebo	Norway	0.150	11.30		11
3	A	6	Yeoryía Koklóni	Greece	0.167	11.31		9.5
3	B	4	Laura Turner	Great Britain	0.172	11.31	CR, SB	9.5
5	A	5	Yevgeniya Polyakova	Russia	0.163	11.36		8
6	A	3	Olesya Povh	Ukraine	0.147	11.38		7
7	A	2	Verena Sailer	Germany	0.196	11.39		6
8	B	5	Digna Luz Murillo	Spain	0.192	11.45		5
9	B	3	Daria Korczyńska	Poland	0.182	11.51	SB	4
10	B	6	Yuliya Balykina	Belarus	0.193	11.53		3
11	B	7	Manuela Levorato	Italy	0.188	11.67		2
12	B	2	Sari Keskitalo	Finland	0.158	11.93	SB	1

=== 200 metres ===
Wind:
Heat A: +1.8 m/s
Heat B: +0.7 m/s

Rank	Heat	Lane	Name	Nationality	React	Time	Notes	Points
1	A	4	Yelizaveta Bryzhina	Ukraine	0.223	22.71	CR, EL	12
2	A	6	Yuliya Chermoshanskaya	Russia	0.203	22.86	SB	11
3	A	5	Lina Jacques-Sébastien	France	0.200	23.06	PB	10
4	A	7	Alena Neumiarzhytskaya	Belarus	0.233	23.32	SB	9
5	A	2	Emily Freeman	Great Britain	0.208	23.34	SB	8
6	A	3	Weronika Wedler	Poland	0.206	23.47		7
7	B	5	Anne Möllinger	Germany	0.197	23.79		6
8	B	6	Andriána Férra	Greece	0.229	23.88		5
9	B	4	Giulia Arcioni	Italy	0.167	23.91		4
10	B	7	Digna Luz Murillo	Spain	0.178	23.96		3
11	B	3	Ezinne Okparaebo	Norway	0.183	24.01		2
12	B	2	Ella Räsänen	Finland	0.173	24.35		1

=== 400 metres ===
Rank	Heat	Lane	Name	Nationality	React	Time	Notes	Points
1	A	6	Kseniya Ustalova	Russia	0.214	51.79		12
2	A	5	Antonina Yefremova	Ukraine	0.203	52.47		11
3	A	4	Sviatlana Usovich	Belarus	0.261	52.91		10
4	A	2	Libania Grenot	Italy	0.236	52.97		9
5	A	3	Virginie Michanol	France	0.243	53.33		8
6	B	5	Kim Wall	Great Britain	0.186	53.48		7
7	B	6	Agata Bednarek	Poland	0.209	54.59		6
8	A	7	Esther Cremer	Germany	0.195	54.59		5
9	B	4	Agní Dervéni	Greece	0.242	54.71		4
10	B	2	Benedicte Hauge	Norway	0.183	55.29		3
11	B	3	Begoña Garrido	Spain	0.246	55.51		2
12	B	7	Emma Millard	Finland	0.389	55.87		1

=== 800 metres ===
Rank	Name	Nationality	Time	Notes	Points
1	Nataliya Lupu	Ukraine	2:02.74		12
~~2~~	Svetlana Klyuka	Russia	~~2:03.49~~	DQ (doping)	0
2	Elisa Cusma Piccione	Italy	2:03.91		11
3	Emma Jackson	Great Britain	2:04.53		10
4	Fanjanteino Félix	France	2:04.55		9
5	Eléni Filándra	Greece	2:04.69		8
6	Ingvill Måkestad Bovim	Norway	2:04.81		7
7	Natallia Kareiva	Belarus	2:04.94		6
8	Nuria Fernández	Spain	2:05.08		5
9	Claudia Hoffmann	Germany	2:05.22		4
10	Agnieszka Leszczyńska	Poland	2:05.64		3
11	Suvi Selvenius	Finland	2:10.81		2

=== 1500 metres ===
Rank	Name	Nationality	Time	Notes	Points
1	Anna Mishchenko	Ukraine	4:05.32	CR	12
2	Hannah England	Great Britain	4:05.70		11
3	Natallia Kareiva	Belarus	4:07.98	PB	10
4	Fanjanteino Félix	France	4:08.34		9
5	Elisa Cusma Piccione	Italy	4:08.53	SB	8
6	Ingvill Måkestad Bovim	Norway	4:08.75		7
7	Sylwia Ejdys	Poland	4:14.45		6
8	María Pánou	Greece	4:16.85		5
9	Irina Maracheva	Russia	4:17.28		4
10	Mari Järvenpää	Finland	4:21.95	SB	3
11	Iris María Fuentes-Pila	Spain	4:24.15		2
12	Denise Krebs	Germany	4:28.54		1

=== 3000 metres ===
Rank	Name	Nationality	Time	Notes	Points
1	Yelena Zadorozhnaya	Russia	9:08.42		12
2	Renata Pliś	Poland	9:08.94	PB	11
3	Ragnhild Kvarberg	Norway	9:09.59	PB	10
4	Natalia Rodríguez	Spain	9:09.92		9
5	Sviatlana Kudzelich	Belarus	9:16.06	PB	8
6	Valentina Costanza	Italy	9:16.59		7
7	Emma Pallant	Great Britain	9:17.47		6
8	Olga Iekimenko	Ukraine	9:17.86		5
9	Konstadína Kefála	Greece	9:21.74	PB	4
10	Simret Restle	Germany	9:21.82		3
11	Saara Pekkarinen	Finland	9:34.81	SB	2
12	Fanny Pruvost	France	9:35.71		1

=== 5000 metres ===
Rank	Name	Nationality	Time	Notes	Points
1	Sabrina Mockenhaupt	Germany	15:17.38	CR	12
2	Jo Pavey	Great Britain	15:17.87		11
3	Karoline Bjerkeli Grøvdal	Norway	15:25.40	PB	10
4	Judith Plá	Spain	15:29.14	SB	9
5	Natalya Popkova	Russia	15:31.01		8
6	Wioletta Frankiewicz	Poland	15:37.83		7
7	Federica Dal Ri	Italy	15:39.21	PB	6
8	Tetyana Holovchenko	Ukraine	15:48.06		5
9	Konstadína Kefála	Greece	15:55.23	PB	4
10	Christelle Daunay	France	15:55.52		3
11	Nastassia Staravoitava	Belarus	15:55.75	SB	2
12	Sanni Klemelä	Finland	17:05.51		1

=== 3000 metres steeplechase ===
Rank	Name	Nationality	Time	Notes	Points
1	Yuliya Zarudneva	Russia	9:23.00	CR	12
2	Rosa María Morató	Spain	9:42.10		11
3	Katarzyna Kowalska	Poland	9:43.40		10
4	Barbara Parker	Great Britain	9:44.81		9
5	Sophie Duarte	France	9:44.85		8
6	Elena Romagnolo	Italy	9:45.19		7
7	Karoline Bjerkeli Grøvdal	Norway	9:47.92		6
8	Iryna Padabed	Belarus	10:03.57	PB	5
9	Sandra Eriksson	Finland	10:05.50		4
10	Verena Dreier	Germany	10:06.41		3
11	Mariya Shatalova	Ukraine	10:08.13		2
12	Athina Koini	Greece	11:11.24		1

=== 100 metres hurdles ===
Wind:
Heat A: -0.3 m/s
Heat B: +0.9 m/s

Rank	Heat	Lane	Name	Nationality	React	Time	Notes	Points
1	A	6	Tatyana Dektyareva	Russia	0.184	12.68	CR, EL	12
2	A	5	Carolin Nytra	Germany	0.189	12.81		11
3	A	2	Christina Vukicevic	Norway	0.162	12.87	SB	10
4	B	4	Alina Talai	Belarus	0.200	13.02	PB	9
5	A	7	Joanna Kocielnik	Poland	0.199	13.04	PB	8
6	B	5	Marzia Caravelli	Italy	0.171	13.10	PB	7
7	A	3	Cindy Billaud	France	0.173	13.14		6
8	B	6	Angie Broadbelt-Blake	Great Britain	0.150	13.33		5
9	B	7	Ana Torrijos	Spain	0.197	13.38	PB	4
10	B	3	Flóra Redoúmi	Greece	0.158	13.50	SB	3
11	B	2	Nooralotta Neziri	Finland	0.148	13.57	SB	2
	B	4	Yevheniya Snihur	Ukraine		DQ	R 162.7	0

=== 400 metres hurdles ===
Rank	Heat	Lane	Name	Nationality	React	Time	Notes	Points
1	A	6	Natalya Antyukh	Russia	0.234	55.27		12
2	A	4	Eilidh Child	Great Britain	0.189	56.48		11
3	A	2	Anastasiya Rabchenyuk	Ukraine	0.214	56.79		10
4	A	5	Anna Jesień	Poland	0.312	57.05		9
5	A	7	Manuela Gentili	Italy	0.254	57.86		8
6	B	3	Stine Tomb	Norway	0.220	58.01		7
7	B	4	Nastassia Buldakova	Belarus	0.274	58.02		6
8	A	3	Fabienne Kohlmann	Germany	0.193	58.06		5
9	B	5	Phara Anacharsis	France	0.237	58.96		4
10	B	7	Ilona Ranta	Finland	0.220	59.25		3
11	B	6	Laia Forcadell	Spain	0.337	59.61		2
12	B	2	Hristína Hantzí-Neag	Greece	0.241	1:00.29		1

=== 4 × 100 metres relay ===
Rank	Heat	Lane	Name	Nationality	Time	Note	Points
1	A	5	Yevgeniya Polyakova, Aleksandra Fedoriva, Yuliya Gushchina, Yuliya Chermoshanskaya	Russia	42.98	CR, EL	12
2	A	7	Lina Jacques-Sébastien, Muriel Hurtis-Houairi, Johanna Danois, Véronique Mang	France	43.47		11
3	A	3	Olesya Povh, Iryna Shtanhyeyeva, Mariya Ryemyen, Nataliya Pohrebnyak	Ukraine	43.72		10
4	A	4	Joice Maduaka, Emily Freeman, Laura Turner, Katherine Endacott	Great Britain	43.77		9
5	B	6	Carolin Nytra, Marion Wagner, Anne Möllinger, Verena Sailer	Germany	43.79		8
6	A	2	Anna Kielbasińska, Daria Korczyńska, Marta Jeschke, Weronika Wedler	Poland	43.97		7
7	A	6	Maria Aurora Salvagno, Martina Giovanetti, Giulia Arcioni, Manuela Levorato	Italy	44.14		6
8	B	4	Yuliya Balykina, Alena Kievich, A Neumiarzhytskaya, Hanna Liapeshka	Belarus	44.51		5
9	B	5	Elefthéria Kobídou, María Karastamáti, Andriána Férra, Yeo Koklóni	Greece	44.71		4
10	B	2	Ana Torrijos, Digna Luz Murillo, Estela García, Amparo María Cotán	Spain	45.34		3
11	B	7	Siri Eritsland, Mari Gilde Brubak, Ida Bakke Hansen, Nina Brandt	Norway	46.37		2
12	B	3	Jasmin Showlah, Noora Hämäläinen, Sari Keskitalo, Minna Laukka	Finland	46.60		1

=== 4 × 400 metres relay ===
Rank	Heat	Lane	Name	Nationality	Time	Note	Points
1	A	6	Kseniya Zadorina, Natalya Ivanova, Natalya Antyukh, Kseniya Ustalova	Russia	3:23.76	WL, CR	12
2	B	5	Fabienne Kohlmann, Esther Cremer, Janin Lindenberg, Claudia Hoffmann	Germany	3:26.96		11
3	A	2	Darya Prystupa, Anastasiya Rabchenyuk, Alina Lohvynenko, Antonina Yefremova	Ukraine	3:27.60		10
4	A	4	Kim Wall, Nadine Okyere, Nicola Sanders, Perri Shakes-Drayton	Great Britain	3:27.75		9
5	A	5	Marie-Angélique Lacordelle, Muriel Hurtis-Houairi, Floria Gueï, Thélia Sigère	France	3:29.72		8
6	B	6	Hanna Tashpulatava, Katsiaryna Mishyna, Maryna Liboza, Sviatlana Usovich	Belarus	3:30.67		7
7	A	7	Chiara Bazzoni, Marta Milani, Daniela Reina, Libania Grenot	Italy	3:31.16		6
8	A	3	Izabela Kostruba, Aneta Jakóbczak, Agata Bednarek, Anna Jesień	Poland	3:33.78		5
9	B	4	Aauri Bokesa, Natalia Romero, Begoña Garrido, Teresa Torres	Spain	3:37.05		4
10	B	2	Ella Räsänen, Emma Millard, Jenniina Halkoaho, Ilona Ranta	Finland	3:37.67		3
11	B	3	Irene Høvik Helgesen, Benedicte Hauge, Nina Brandt, Stine Tomb	Norway	3:38.47		2
12	B	7	María Panayiotídou, María Belibasáki, Aléna-María Pádi, Agní Dervéni	Greece	3:40.83		1

=== High jump ===
Rank	Name	Nationality	1.70	1.75	1.80	1.85	1.89	1.92	1.95	1.98	2.00	2.02	Mark	Note	Points
1	Antonietta Di Martino	Italy	–	–	o	o	o	o	o	o	xo	xxx	2.00	SB	12
2	Svetlana Shkolina	Russia	–	–	o	o	o	o	xo	o	xxx		1.98	=PB	11
3	Ariane Friedrich	Germany	–	–	–	o	o	o	o	xxo	xx		1.98	SB	10
4	Ruth Beitia	Spain	–	–	o	o	o	o	o	xx-	x		1.95		9
5	Viktoriya Styopina	Ukraine	–	o	o	o	xo	xxx					1.89		8
6	Tonje Angelsen	Norway	o	xo	o	o	xxx						1.85		7
7	Maryia Nestsiarchuk	Belarus	o	o	o	xxx							1.80		5.5
7	Adonía Steryíou	Greece	o	o	o								1.80		5.5
9	Stephanie Pywell	Great Britain	–	xo	o	xxx							1.80		4
10	Nina Manga	France	o	o	xxx								1.75		3
11	Mari Sepänmaa	Finland	o	xo	xxx								1.75		2
12	Justyna Kasprzycka	Poland	o	xxo	xx								1.75		1

=== Pole vault ===
Rank	Name	Nationality	3.45	3.85	4.05	4.20	4.30	4.40	4.50	4.55	4.60	4.65	4.70	Mark	Note	Points
1	Svetlana Feofanova	Russia	–	–	–	–	–	o	–	o	–	o		4.65		12
2	Silke Spiegelburg	Germany	–	–	–	–	o	–	o	–	xx-	o	xxx	4.65		11
3	Anna Rogowska	Poland	–	–	–	–	–	xo	–	x-	xx			4.40		10
4	Elena Scarpellini	Italy	–	o	o	o	o	xxx						4.30	SB	9
5	Minna Nikkanen	Finland	–	o	xo	xx-	o	x						4.30		8
6	Cathrine Larsåsen	Norway	–	o	o	o	xxo	xx						4.30	=NR	7
7	Kate Dennison	Great Britain	–	–	–	o	–	xxx						4.20		6
8	Telie Mathiot	France	–	o	o	o	xxx							4.20		5
9	Anna María Pinero	Spain	–	o	xxo	xo	x							4.20		4
10	Afrodíti Skafída	Greece	–	xxo	xx									3.85		3
11	Zhanna Bayandzina	Belarus	o	xxx										3.45		2
12	Kateryna Kozlova	Ukraine	xo	xxx										3.45		1

=== Long jump ===
Rank	Name	Nationality	#1	#2	#3	#4	Mark	Notes	Points
1	Éloyse Lesueur	France	6.78	6.65	6.44	6.34	6.78	PB	12
2	Olga Kucherenko	Russia	6.67	6.44	6.67	x	6.67		11
3	Margrethe Renstrøm	Norway	x	6.49	x	x	6.49	SB	10
4	Nastassia Mironchyk	Belarus	6.48	6.33	6.37	6.40	6.48		9
5	Malgorzata Trybańska	Poland	6.41	6.47	6.35		6.47		8
6	Viktoriya Rybalko	Ukraine	x	6.42	6.32		6.42		7
7	Jade Johnson	Great Britain	6.26	6.05	6.18		6.26		6
8	Bianca Kappler	Germany	x	6.19	6.22		6.22		5
9	Noora Pesola	Finland	x	5.88	5.92		5.92		4
10	Ruth Ndoumbe	Spain	5.91	5.81	x		5.91		3
11	Enrica Cipolloni	Italy	4.43	5.76	x		5.76	PB	2
12	Athanasía Pérra	Greece	5.75	5.69	5.29		5.75		1

=== Triple jump ===
Rank	Name	Nationality	#1	#2	#3	#4	Mark	Notes	Points
1	Olha Saladuha	Ukraine	14.39	14.20w	13.99	14.02	14.39		12
2	Athanasía Pérra	Greece	14.07w	14.34w	14.15w	14.37	14.37		11
3	Yekaterina Kayukova	Russia	x	14.15	14.01	14.26w	14.26w		10
4	Kseniya Dzetsuk	Belarus	x	14.15	14.01	13.89	14.15		9
5	Simona La Mantia	Italy	14.04	13.65	13.79		14.04		8
6	Teresa Nzola Meso Ba	France	x	13.83	14.00		14.00		7
~~7~~	Joanna Skibińska	Poland	~~13.89~~	~~x~~	~~x~~		~~13.89~~	DQ (doping)	0
7	Katja Demut	Germany	13.52	13.43	13.78		13.78		6
8	Inger Anne Frøysedal	Norway	13.43	13.63	x		13.63	PB	5
9	Nadia Williams	Great Britain	13.29	13.38	12.99		13.38		4
10	Patricia Sarrapio	Spain	13.37	x	11.76		13.37		3
11	Kristiina Mäkelä	Finland	12.61	12.76	12.51		12.76		2

=== Shot put ===
Rank	Name	Nationality	#1	#2	#3	#4	Mark	Notes	Points
1	Anna Avdeyeva	Russia	19.14	19.00	18.58	19.12	19.14	SB	12
2	Petra Lammert	Germany	18.07	x	x	18.31	18.31		11
3	Chiara Rosa	Italy	17.63	x	x	17.77	17.77		10
4	Vera Yepimashka	Belarus	13.93	17.77	x	16.52	17.77		9
5	Agnieszka Bronisz	Poland	16.77	16.29	17.00		17.00	SB	8
6	Jessica Cérival	France	16.86	16.41	16.96		16.96		7
7	Úrsula Ruiz	Spain	16.02	15.87	16.47		16.47		6
8	Iríni Terzóglou	Greece	15.79	16.17	15.56		16.17	SB	5
9	Rebecca Peake	Great Britain	15.48	15.67	15.27		15.67		4
10	Hanna Samolyuk	Ukraine	15.14	x	15.49		15.49		3
11	Kristin Sundsteigen	Norway	x	14.83	14.26		14.83	PB	2
12	Hennariikka Järvinen	Finland	13.73	14.28	13.84		14.28		1

=== Discus throw ===
Rank	Name	Nationality	#1	#2	#3	#4	Mark	Notes	Points
1	Nadine Müller	Germany	63.53	x	x	61.30	63.53	CR	12
2	Natalya Sadova	Russia	56.26	57.36	59.59	x	59.59		11
3	Kateryna Karsak	Ukraine	x	54.59	57.20	x	57.20		10
4	Laura Bordignon	Italy	53.99	54.09	54.53	x	54.53		9
5	Joanna Wiśniewska	Poland	53.68	54.25	x		54.25		8
6	Melanie Pingeon	France	x	47.85	53.59		53.59	PB	7
7	Philippa Roles	Great Britain	53.30	53.33	52.07		53.33		6
8	Nastassia Kashtanava	Belarus	50.27	x	52.78		52.78		5
9	Grete Etholm	Norway	52.71	51.00	x		52.71		4
10	Irache Quintanal	Spain	x	47.79	50.53		50.53		3
11	Tanja Komulainen	Finland	x	50.29	x		50.29		2
12	Dorothéa Kalpakídou	Greece	48.69	48.93	x		48.93		1

=== Hammer throw ===
Rank	Name	Nationality	#1	#2	#3	#4	Mark	Notes	Points
1	Betty Heidler	Germany	72.70	x	72.30	73.24	73.24		12
2	Tatyana Lysenko	Russia	69.55	69.45	69.06	70.21	70.21		11
3	Daryia Pchelnik	Belarus	67.76	69.86	x	x	69.86		10
4	Stéphanie Falzon	France	66.68	69.24	x	x	69.24		9
5	Nataliya Zolotuhina	Ukraine	68.32	66.64	67.97		68.32		8
6	Stilianí Papadopoúlou	Greece	63.40	x	68.19		68.19		7
7	Merja Korpela	Finland	66.72	66.91	x		66.91		6
8	Berta Castells	Spain	64.86	x	66.63		66.63		5
9	Clarissa Claretti	Italy	66.14	x	66.19		66.19		4
10	Mona Holm	Norway	66.01	x	x		66.01		3
11	Małgorzata Zadura	Poland	65.08	x	x		65.08		2
12	Sarah Holt	Great Britain	x	55.66	x		55.66		1

=== Javelin throw ===
Rank	Name	Nationality	#1	#2	#3	#4	Mark	Notes	Points
1	Christina Obergföll	Germany	59.32	x	59.88	x	59.88		12
2	Goldie Sayers	Great Britain	57.26	57.84	56.17	59.25	59.25		11
3	Mariya Abakumova	Russia	58.24	x	x	x	58.24		10
4	Oona Sormunen	Finland	57.11	57.02	x	53.57	57.11		9
5	Vira Rebryk	Ukraine	56.97	x	51.96		56.97		8
6	Mercedes Chilla	Spain	51.40	52.86	55.83		55.83		7
7	Zahra Bani	Italy	51.94	x	54.79		54.79		6
8	Sávva Líka	Greece	47.24	53.12	x		53.12		5
9	Maryna Novik	Belarus	47.13	52.06	51.37		52.06		4
10	Matilde Andraud	France	46.29	46.03	48.54		48.54		3
11	Magdalena Czenska	Poland	43.98	48.51	47.93		48.51		2
12	Ina Cathrin Kartum	Norway	41.29	44.13	42.78		44.13		1

== Score table ==
Event		RUS	GBR	GER	FRA	UKR	POL	ITA	BLR	ESP	GRE	NOR	FIN
100 metres	M	8	12	0	11	5	6	10	7	9	2	3	4
100 metres	W	8	9.5	6	12	7	4	2	3	5	9.5	11	1
200 metres	M	2	8	10	12	9	7	5	3	4	11	1	6
200 metres	W	11	8	6	10	12	7	4	9	3	5	2	1
400 metres	M	10	12	8	11	5	6	7	1	3	9	2	4
400 metres	W	12	7	5.5	8	11	5.5	9	10	2	4	3	1
800 metres	M	12	11	9	6	4	10	5	7	8	1	3	2
800 metres	W	0	10	4	9	12	3	11	6	5	8	7	2
1500 metres	M	5	12	10	3	8	9	11	2	4	1	7	6
1500 metres	W	4	11	1	9	12	6	8	10	2	5	7	3
3000 metres	M	10	2	6	9	11	8	7	5	12	1	3	4
3000 metres	W	12	6	3	1	5	11	7	8	9	4	10	2
5000 metres	M	9	12	2	4	10	5	8	3	11	1	6	7
5000 metres	W	8	11	12	3	5	7	6	2	9	4	10	1
3000 metre steeplechase	M	5	8	11	7	0	12	6	3	9	2	4	10
3000 metre steeplechase	W	12	9	4	8	3	10	7	0	11	2	6	5
110/100 metre hurdles	M	4.5	12	6	4.5	2	11	7	9	10	8	1	3
110/100 metre hurdles	W	12	5	11	6	0	8	7	9	4	3	10	2
400 metre hurdles	M	10	12	7	8	9	4	6	5	0	11	3	0
400 metre hurdles	W	12	11	5	4	10	9	8	6	2	1	7	3
4 × 100 metres relay	M	8	11	10	0	7	9	12	3	6	4	2	5
4 × 100 metres relay	W	12	9	8	11	10	7	6	5	3	4	2	1
4 × 400 metres relay	M	12	11	7	6	10	8	9	3	4	5	2	1
4 × 400 metres relay	W	12	9	11	8	10	5	6	7	4	1	2	3
High jump	M	12	11	3	9	10	4.5	7.5	4.5	6	7.5	1	2
High jump	W	11	4	10	3	8	1	12	5.5	9	5.5	7	2
Pole vault	M	7	0	8	12	5	11	10	3	6	9	2	4
Pole vault	W	12	5.5	11	5.5	1	10	9	2	4	3	7	8
Long jump	M	12	10	7	11	2	5	4	1	8	6	3	9
Long jump	W	11	6	5	12	7	8	2	9	3	1	10	4
Triple jump	M	8	11	3	10	12	5	9	7	4	6	1	2
Triple jump	W	10	4	6	7	12	0	8	9	3	11	5	2
Shot put	M	7	8	11	10	6	12	3	9	5	4	1	2
Shot put	W	12	4	11	7	3	8	10	9	6	5	2	1
Discus throw	M	10	2	12	5	7	11	3	8	9	4	0	6
Discus throw	W	11	6	12	7	10	8	9	5	3	1	4	2
Hammer throw	M	6	2	10	9	3	8	11	12	1	4	5	7
Hammer throw	W	11	1	12	9	8	2	4	10	5	7	3	6
Javelin throw	M	8	5	12	1	9	6	3	7	2	4	11	10
Javelin throw	W	10	11	12	3	8	2	6	4	7	5	1	9
Country		RUS	GBR	GER	FRA	UKR	POL	ITA	BLR	ESP	GRE	NOR	FIN
Total		368.5	318.5	307	291	287	278	284.5	236.5	220	189	177	152
