= Athletics at the 2013 Summer Universiade – Men's 4 × 100 metres relay =

The men's 4 x 100 metres relay event at the 2013 Summer Universiade was held on 11–12 July.

== Medalists ==
Gold	Silver	Bronze
Ukraine; Ruslan Perestiuk; Serhiy Smelyk; Ihor Bodrov; Vitaliy Korzh	Japan; Ryota Yamagata; Yousuke Hara; Rui Yonaguni; Shōta Iizuka; Jun Kimura*	Poland; Jakub Adamski; Dariusz Kuć; Artur Zaczek; Kamil Kryński

* Athletes who competed in heats only and received medals.

== Results ==
=== Heats ===
Qualification: First 2 teams of each heat (Q) plus the next 2 fastest (q) qualified for the final.

Rank	Heat	Nation	Athletes	Time	Notes
1	3	Ukraine	Ruslan Perestiuk, Serhiy Smelyk, Ihor Bodrov, Vitaliy Korzh	38.75	Q
2	2	Canada	Michael Robertson, Oluwasegun Makinde, Brendon Rodney, Samuel Effah	39.64	Q
3	1	Poland	Jakub Adamski, Dariusz Kuć, Artur Zaczek, Kamil Kryński	39.71	Q
4	3	Thailand	Ruttanapon Sowan, Aphisit Promkaew, Jirapong Meenapra, Suppachai Chimdee	39.80	Q
5	3	Japan	Ryota Yamagata, Yousuke Hara, Jun Kimura, Shōta Iizuka	39.85	q
6	1	China	Yang Zhanlin, Gao Dongshi, Yang Yang, Wu Zhiqiang	39.86	Q
7	2	South Africa	Akani Simbine, Henricho Bruintjies, Gideon Trotter, Jacques de Swardt	39.94	Q
8	3	Singapore	Calvin Kang Li Loong, Mohd Amiruddin Jamal, Lee Cheng Wei, Lim Yao Peng	40.15	q
9	1	United States Virgin Islands	Eddie Lovett, David Walters, Collister Fahie, Leon Hunt	40.48	
10	2	Ghana	Eric Goloe, Emmanuel Kubi, Saalu Chiba Seidu, Malik Ibrahim	41.59	
11	2	Sri Lanka	Thisara Weerasinghe, Daham Agampodi, Kahatagaspele Gedara, Lahiru Dilankara	42.15	
12	1	Uganda	Daniel Bingi, Noah Mwidu, Johnson Anywar, Eric Wanume	42.62	
13	1	Oman		43.50	
	1	Russia	Aleksandr Brednev, Maksim Polovinkin, Aleksandr Khyutte, Artur Reysbikh	DNF	
	2	Lithuania		DNS	
	2	Sierra Leone		DNS	
	3	Namibia		DNS	

=== Final ===
Rank	Lane	Nation	Athletes	Time	Notes
1st place, gold medalist(s)	3	Ukraine	Ruslan Perestiuk, Serhiy Smelyk, Ihor Bodrov, Vitaliy Korzh	38.56	
2nd place, silver medalist(s)	2	Japan	Ryota Yamagata, Yousuke Hara, Rui Yonaguni, Shōta Iizuka	39.12	
3rd place, bronze medalist(s)	5	Poland	Jakub Adamski, Dariusz Kuć, Artur Zaczek, Kamil Kryński	39.29	
4	4	Thailand	Ruttanapon Sowan, Aphisit Promkaew, Jirapong Meenapra, Suppachai Chimdee	39.30	
5	7	China	Yang Zhanlin, Gao Dongshi, Yang Yang, Wu Zhiqiang	39.54	
6	1	Singapore	Calvin Kang Li Loong, Mohd Amiruddin Jamal, Lee Cheng Wei, Lim Yao Peng	40.27	
7	8	South Africa	Akani Simbine, Henricho Bruintjies, Gideon Trotter, Anaso Jobodwana	45.82	
	6	Canada	Michael Robertson, Oluwasegun Makinde, Brendon Rodney, Samuel Effah	DQ	
