= Athletics at the 2013 Summer Universiade – Men's 100 metres =

The men's 100 metres event at the 2013 Summer Universiade was held on 7–8 July.

== Medalists ==
Gold	Silver	Bronze
Anaso Jobodwana; South Africa	Ryota Yamagata; Japan	Hua Wilfried Serge Koffi; Ivory Coast

== Results ==
=== Heats ===
Qualification: First 3 in each heat and 5 best performers advanced to the quarterfinals.

Wind:
Heat 1: +0.4 m/s, Heat 2: +0.8 m/s, Heat 3: -0.4 m/s, Heat 4: +0.3 m/s, Heat 5: -0.8 m/s, Heat 6: +0.4 m/s, Heat 7: 0.0 m/s, Heat 8: -0.8 m/s, Heat 9: -0.8 m/s

Rank	Heat	Name	Nationality	Time	Notes
1	1	Akani Simbine	South Africa	10.36	Q, SB
2	9	Hua Wilfried Koffi	Ivory Coast	10.37	Q
3	8	Justin Austin	United States	10.40	Q
4	7	Ryota Yamagata	Japan	10.41	Q
5	4	Nicholas Watson	Jamaica	10.43	Q
6	3	Sergii Smelyk	Ukraine	10.47	Q
7	8	Igor Bodrov	Ukraine	10.49	Q
8	7	Rytis Sakalauskas	Lithuania	10.49	Q
9	9	Vitaliy Korzh	Ukraine	10.50	Q
10	1	Tom Gamble	Australia	10.52	Q
11	8	Aleksandr Brednev	Russia	10.52	Q
12	3	Mikhail Idrisov	Russia	10.53	Q
13	4	Nicholas Hough	Australia	10.53	Q
14	7	Yang Yang	China	10.55	Q
15	6	Artur Zaczek	Poland	10.56	Q
16	7	Emmanuel Kubi	Ghana	10.57	q
17	2	Anaso Jobodwana	South Africa	10.61	Q
18	6	Wu Zhiqiang	China	10.63	Q
19	5	Samuel Effah	Canada	10.64	Q
20	9	Jirapong Meenapra	Thailand	10.68	Q
21	2	Rui Yonaguni	Japan	10.70	Q
22	8	Battulgyn Achitbileg	Mongolia	10.71	q, NR
23	4	David Walters	U.S. Virgin Islands	10.72	Q
24	4	Enrique Polanco	Chile	10.72	q
25	8	Aphisit Promkaew	Thailand	10.74	q
26	1	Itayi Vambe	Zimbabwe	10.75	Q, PB
27	5	Sibusiso Matsenjwa	Swaziland	10.76	Q
28	4	Keene Motukisi	Botswana	10.80	q, PB
29	8	Lee Jae-ha	South Korea	10.80	
30	2	LeSean Noel	Trinidad and Tobago	10.81	Q
31	5	Pedro Bernardo	Portugal	10.83	Q
32	3	Iswandi Iswandi	Indonesia	10.85	Q
33	6	Mak Shing Hei	Hong Kong	10.86	Q
34	2	Mike Kalisz	Denmark	10.88	
35	3	Jesse Uri-Khob	Namibia	10.95	
36	1	Davron Atabaev	Tajikistan	10.98	
37	3	Kannan Subramaniam	Malaysia	10.98	
38	8	Blaž Brulc	Slovenia	10.98	
39	7	Moulaye Sonko	Senegal	10.99	
40	7	Daham Agampodi	Sri Lanka	11.00	
41	5	Eric Goloe	Ghana	11.04	
42	1	Maninder Singh Hira	India	11.07	
43	9	Kasper Olsen	Denmark	11.07	
44	1	Andy Grech	Malta	11.16	
45	1	Prince Yangou Bethykpaingui	Central African Republic	11.18	
46	8	Ali Limoosa	United Arab Emirates	11.18	
47	3	Leong Wang Kuong	Macau	11.39	
48	3	Daniel Bingi	Uganda	11.50	
49	7	El Hadad Houmadi	Comoros	11.66	
50	3	Tran Quoc Nhan	Vietnam	11.67	
51	4	Alassane Diakite	Mali	11.75	
52	9	Razat Chakratbartey	Bangladesh	11.77	
53	9	Eric Wanume	Uganda	11.83	
54	6	Aboubacar Coulibaly	Mali	11.94	
55	6	Mashaka Onyango	Tanzania	12.06	
56	5	Steve Patton	DR Congo	12.31	
57	5	Hafiz Shehbaz Ali	Pakistan	13.08	
	2	Dariusz Kuć	Poland	DNF	
	1	Rasheed Dwyer	Jamaica	DNS	
	2	Mohamed Kamara	Sierra Leone	DNS	
	2	Douglas Kanuri	Kenya	DNS	
	4	Lo Yen-Yao	Chinese Taipei	DNS	
	4	Nigel Tomah	Zimbabwe	DNS	
	5	Adeseye Ogunlewe	Nigeria	DNS	
	6	Ahmed Ali	United States	DNS	
	6	Ogho-Oghene Egwero	Nigeria	DNS	
	6	Amr Seoud	Egypt	DNS	
	9	Fredrick Agbaje	Nigeria	DNS	
	9	Mohamed Kamara	Sierra Leone	DNS	

=== Quarterfinals ===
Qualification: First 3 in each heat (Q) and the next 4 fastest (q) qualified for the semifinals.

Wind:
Heat 1: -0.2 m/s, Heat 2: -0.3 m/s, Heat 3: -0.1 m/s, Heat 4: -0.4 m/s

Rank	Heat	Name	Nationality	Time	Notes
1	1	Sergii Smelyk	Ukraine	10.25	Q, PB
2	3	Ryota Yamagata	Japan	10.27	Q
3	4	Anaso Jobodwana	South Africa	10.28	Q
4	1	Rytis Sakalauskas	Lithuania	10.30	Q, SB
5	4	Igor Bodrov	Ukraine	10.32	Q
6	2	Samuel Effah	Canada	10.34	Q
7	4	Hua Wilfried Koffi	Ivory Coast	10.35	Q
8	3	Nicholas Watson	Jamaica	10.35	Q
9	2	Akani Simbine	South Africa	10.38	Q
10	1	Mikhail Idrisov	Russia	10.41	Q
11	1	Justin Austin	United States	10.42	q
12	3	Aleksandr Brednev	Russia	10.42	Q
13	4	Nicholas Hough	Australia	10.47	q
14	1	David Walters	U.S. Virgin Islands	10.48	q
15	1	Yang Yang	China	10.52	q
16	4	Sibusiso Matsenjwa	Swaziland	10.53	
17	3	Tom Gamble	Australia	10.60	
18	3	Emmanuel Kubi	Ghana	10.62	
19	2	Artur Zaczek	Poland	10.68	Q
20	2	Pedro Bernardo	Portugal	10.71	
21	2	Keene Motukisi	Botswana	10.72	PB
22	2	Wu Zhiqiang	China	10.72	
23	3	Battulgyn Achitbileg	Mongolia	10.73	
24	1	Enrique Polanco	Chile	10.78	
25	4	Aphisit Promkaew	Thailand	10.78	
26	2	LeSean Noel	Trinidad and Tobago	10.79	
27	2	Rui Yonaguni	Japan	10.80	
28	4	Iswandi Iswandi	Indonesia	10.80	
29	3	Jirapong Meenapra	Thailand	10.84	
30	4	Itayi Vambe	Zimbabwe	10.97	
31	1	Mak Shing Hei	Hong Kong	11.03	
	3	Vitaliy Korzh	Ukraine	DQ	

=== Semifinals ===
Qualification: First 4 in each heat (Q) qualified for the final.

Wind:
Heat 1: -0.2 m/s, Heat 2: -0.4 m/s

Rank	Heat	Name	Nationality	Time	Notes
1	1	Anaso Jobodwana	South Africa	10.29	Q
2	2	Hua Wilfried Koffi	Ivory Coast	10.32	Q
3	1	Ryota Yamagata	Japan	10.34	Q
4	2	Samuel Effah	Canada	10.34	Q
5	1	Igor Bodrov	Ukraine	10.36	Q
6	2	Rytis Sakalauskas	Lithuania	10.37	Q
7	2	Sergii Smelyk	Ukraine	10.42	Q
8	1	Mikhail Idrisov	Russia	10.48	Q
9	1	Nicholas Watson	Jamaica	10.49	
9	2	Akani Simbine	South Africa	10.49	
11	1	Nicholas Hough	Australia	10.50	
12	2	Aleksandr Brednev	Russia	10.51	
13	2	Justin Austin	United States	10.59	
13	2	Yang Yang	China	10.59	
15	1	David Walters	U.S. Virgin Islands	10.62	
16	1	Artur Zaczek	Poland	10.75	

=== Final ===
Wind: +0.5 m/s

Rank	Lane	Name	Nationality	Time	Notes
1st place, gold medalist(s)	3	Anaso Jobodwana	South Africa	10.10	=PB
2nd place, silver medalist(s)	5	Ryota Yamagata	Japan	10.21	
3rd place, bronze medalist(s)	4	Hua Wilfried Koffi	Ivory Coast	10.21	PB
4	1	Sergii Smelyk	Ukraine	10.21	PB
5	8	Igor Bodrov	Ukraine	10.29	
6	6	Samuel Effah	Canada	10.29	
7	7	Rytis Sakalauskas	Lithuania	10.30	=SB
8	2	Mikhail Idrisov	Russia	10.64	
