= Athletics at the 2011 Summer Universiade – Men's 4 × 100 metres relay =

The men's 4 x 100 metres relay event at the 2011 Summer Universiade was held on 20–21 August.

== Medalists ==
Gold	Silver	Bronze
South Africa; Hannes Dreyer; Simon Magakwe; Rapula Sefanyetso; Thuso Mpuang	China; Yang Yang; Huan Minhua; Chang Pengben; Zheng Dongsheng; Kao Haichao*	Hong Kong; Yip Siukeung; Lai Chunho; Leung Kiho; Ho Manloklawrence

* Athletes who competed in heats only and received medals.

== Results ==
=== Heats ===
Qualification: First 2 teams of each heat (Q) plus the next 2 fastest (q) qualified for the final.

Rank	Heat	Nation	Athletes	Time	Notes
1	2	Russia	Aleksandr Brednev, Konstantin Petriashov, Roman Smirnov, Aleksandr Khyutte	39.37	Q
2	3	Hong Kong	Yip Siukeung, Lai Chunho, Leung Kiho, Ho Manloklawrence	39.53	Q
3	1	South Africa	Hannes Dreyer, Simon Magakwe, Rapula Sefanyetso, Thuso Mpuang	39.56	Q
4	2	China	Yang Yang, Huan Minhua, Kao Haichao, Zheng Dongsheng	39.57	Q
5	3	Thailand	Weerawat Pharueang, Wachara Sondee, Sompote Suwannarangsri, Suppachai Chimdee	39.81	Q
6	3	Lithuania	Martynas Jurgilas, Rytis Sakalauskas, Martas Skrabulis, Aivaras Pranckevičius	40.05	q
7	2	Singapore	Kang Li Loong Calvin, Muhammad Amirudin Jamal, Lee Cheng Wei, Yeo Fu Ee Gary	40.33	q, SB
8	3	Great Britain	Richard Davenport, James Alaka, Rion Pierre, Ashley Bryant	40.38	
9	2	Nigeria	Emmanuel Bamise, Obinna Metu, Stanley Gbagbeke, Ogho-Oghene Egwero	40.43	
10	3	Ghana	Kelvin Asare, Enoch Sekum, Elorm Amenakpor, Michael Tinadu	41.13	
11	1	Botswana	Goabaone Moitoi, Thapelo Ketlogetswe, Tirafalo Batsholelwang, Keene Motukisi	41.19	Q
12	3	Malaysia	Mohd Zabidi Ghazali, Mohammad Noor Imran A Hadi, Latif Nyat, Nor Mohd Ikhwan	41.50	
13	3	Namibia	Gregor Areseb, Johannes Maritz, Jesse Uri Khob, Lee Roy Bock	41.51	
14	1	Oman	Abdullah Said Alabri, Mohammed Khalfan Al Mayahi, Ouf Hamed Aloufi, Ismail Alkindi	43.76	
	1	Jamaica	Peter Matthews, Jason Young, Rasheed Dwyer, Jacques Harvey	DQ	170.14
	2	Japan	Ryota Yamagata, Yusuke Kotani, Sota Kawatsura, Shōta Iizuka	DQ	170.14
	1	Italy		DNS	
	1	Latvia		DNS	
	2	Indonesia		DNS	

=== Final ===
Rank	Lane	Nation	Athletes	Time	Notes
1st place, gold medalist(s)	6	South Africa	Hannes Dreyer, Simon Magakwe, Rapula Sefanyetso, Thuso Mpuang	39.25	
2nd place, silver medalist(s)	5	China	Yang Yang, Huan Minhua, Chang Pengben, Zheng Dongsheng	39.39	
3rd place, bronze medalist(s)	3	Hong Kong	Yip Siukeung, Lai Chunho, Leung Kiho, Ho Manloklawrence	39.44	
4	1	Singapore	Kang Li Loong Calvin, Muhammad Amirudin Jamal, Lee Cheng Wei, Yeo Fu Ee Gary	40.44	
5	8	Botswana	Goabaone Moitoi, Thapelo Ketlogetswe, Tirafalo Batsholelwang, Keene Motukisi	41.73	
	2	Lithuania	Egidijus Dilys, Rytis Sakalauskas, Martas Skrabulis, Martynas Jurgilas	DQ	170.14
	4	Russia	Aleksandr Brednev, Konstantin Petriashov, Roman Smirnov, Aleksandr Khyutte	DQ	170.14
	7	Thailand	Weerawat Pharueang, Wachara Sondee, Sompote Suwannarangsri, Suppachai Chimdee	DQ	170.14
