= Athletics at the 2015 Summer Universiade – Men's 4 × 100 metres relay =

The men's 4 x 100 metres relay event at the 2015 Summer Universiade was held on 11 and 12 July at the Gwangju Universiade Main Stadium.

== Medalists ==
Gold	Silver	Bronze
Japan; Kazuma Oseto; Takuya Nagata; Tatsuro Suwa; Kotaro Taniguchi; Yuki Koike*	Poland; Adam Pawłowski; Grzegorz Zimniewicz; Artur Zaczek; Kamil Kryński; Jakub Adamski*	South Africa; Ncincilili Titi; Gideon Trotter; Eckhardt Rossouw; Akani Simbine

* Athletes who competed in heats only.

== Results ==
=== Heats ===
Qualification: First 2 teams of each heat (Q) plus the next 2 fastest (q) qualified for the final.

Rank	Heat	Nation	Athletes	Time	Notes
1	1	Japan	Kazuma Oseto, Takuya Nagata, Yuki Koike, Tatsuro Suwa	38.93	Q, SB
2	2	Poland	Adam Pawłowski, Jakub Adamski, Artur Zaczek, Kamil Kryński	39.12	Q
3	3	Australia	Jin Su Jung, Tom Gamble, Nicholas Hough, Hugh Donovan	39.24	Q, SB
4	1	Thailand	Ruttanapon Sowan, Aphisit Promkaew, Jirapong Meenapra, Jaran Sathoengram	39.29	Q
5	2	Russia	Dmitriy Lopin, Aleksandr Brednev, Vyacheslav Kolesnichenko, Maksim Polovinkin	39.42	Q
6	2	South Africa	Ncincilili Titi, Gideon Trotter, Eckhardt Rossouw, Akani Simbine	39.44	q
7	3	China	Yang Zhanlin, Gao Ze, Ma Jingwei, Yang Yang	39.69	Q
8	3	South Korea	Kim Woo-sam, Choi Min-suk, Kim Kuk-young, Kim Ui-yeon	39.75	q
9	1	Ghana	Martin Owusu Antwi, Emmanuel Appiah Kubi, Elorm Amenakpor, Desmond Aryee	39.99	SB
10	1	Canada	Bismark Boateng, Drelan Bramwell, Khalil Parris, Mobolade Ajomale	40.30	
11	1	Nigeria	Chukwuma Onyeaku, Ayotoluwafunmi Agusto, Afoke Oshasha, Tega Odele	40.45	
12	2	Uganda	Solomon Obuto, Pius Adome, Daniel Bingi, Godwin Byamukama	40.67	SB
13	1	Botswana	Thabo Motsokono, Rebeilwe Thwanyane, Katlego Lenkopane, Ditiro Sebele	40.69	
14	2	Hong Kong	Li Lut Yin, Chan Ka Chun, Leung King Hung, Choi Ho Sing	41.05	SB
15	3	Oman	Saif Al-Obaidani, Usama Al-Gheilani, Ali Rashid Al-Marjabi, Mohammed Al-Maqbali	41.71	
	2	United States	Markesh Woodson, Ronald Baker, Bryce Robinson, Leon Powell	DNF	
	3	Chinese Taipei	Wang Wen-Tang, Yang Chun-Han, Cheng Po-Yu, Chen Chia-Hsun	DNF	
	3	Lithuania	Lukas Gaudutis, Rytis Sakalauskas, Kostas Skrabulis, Ugnius Savickas	DNF	

=== Final ===
Official Video

Rank	Lane	Nation	Athletes	Time	Notes
1st place, gold medalist(s)	3	Japan	Kazuma Oseto, Takuya Nagata, Tatsuro Suwa, Kotaro Taniguchi	39.08	
2nd place, silver medalist(s)	4	Poland	Adam Pawłowski, Grzegorz Zimniewicz, Artur Zaczek, Kamil Kryński	39.50	
3rd place, bronze medalist(s)	2	South Africa	Ncincilili Titi, Gideon Trotter, Eckhardt Rossouw, Akani Simbine	39.68	
4	5	Australia	Jin Su Jung, Tom Gamble, Ben Jaworski, Hugh Donovan	39.71	
5	6	Thailand	Ruttanapon Sowan, Aphisit Promkaew, Jirapong Meenapra, Jaran Sathoengram	39.86	
6	7	China	Yang Zhanlin, Gao Ze, Ma Jingwei, Yang Yang	40.12	
7	1	South Korea	Kim Woo-sam, Choi Min-suk, Park Chan-yang, Han Du-hyeon	41.70	
	8	Russia	Dmitriy Lopin, Aleksandr Brednev, Vyacheslav Kolesnichenko, Artur Reysbikh	DNF	
