= Athletics at the 2014 Asian Games – Men's 4 × 100 metres relay =

Men's 4 × 100 metres relay at the 2014 Asian Games
- Venue: Incheon Asiad Main Stadium
- Dates: 29 September – 2 October 2014
- Competitors: 41 from 11 nations

Medalists
gold medal	China; Chen Shiwei, Xie Zhenye, Su Bingtian, Zhang Peimeng, Yang Yang, Mo Youxue
silver medal	Japan; Ryota Yamagata, Shota Iizuka, Shinji Takahira, Kei Takase, Shota Hara
bronze medal	Hong Kong; Tang Yik Chun, So Chun Hong, Ng Ka Fung, Tsui Chi Ho, Lai Chun Ho

The men's 4 × 100 metres relay event at the 2014 Asian Games was held at the Incheon Asiad Main Stadium, Incheon, South Korea on 29 September – 2 October.

== Schedule ==
All times are Korea Standard Time (UTC+09:00)

Date	Time	Event
Monday, 29 September 2014	19:45	Round 1
Thursday, 2 October 2014	19:45	Final

== Records ==
Prior to this competition, the existing world, Asian and Games records were as follows.

World Record	Jamaica	36.84	London, United Kingdom	11 August 2012
Asian Record	Japan	38.03	Osaka, Japan	1 September 2007
Games Record	China	38.78	Guangzhou, China	26 November 2010

== Results ==
Legend

- DNS — Did not start
- DSQ — Disqualified

=== Round 1 ===
- Qualification: First 3 in each heat (Q) and the next 2 fastest (q) advance to the final.

==== Heat 1 ====
Rank	Team	Time	Notes
1	South Korea (KOR); Yeo Ho-sua; Cho Kyu-won; Oh Kyong-soo; Kim Kuk-young	38.97	Q
2	China (CHN); Chen Shiwei; Xie Zhenye; Yang Yang; Mo Youxue	39.07	Q
3	Thailand (THA); Jaran Sathoengram; Aphisit Promkaew; Jirapong Meenapra; Ruttanapon Sowan	39.25	Q
4	Chinese Taipei (TPE); Yang Chun-han; Liu Yuan-kai; Wang Wen-tang; Lo Yen-yao	39.67	q
5	Macau (MAC); Pao Hin Fong; Leong Wang Kuong; Lao Iong; Iong Kim Fai	41.17	q
—	Kuwait (KUW) — — — —	DNS	

==== Heat 2 ====
Rank	Team	Time	Notes
1	Japan (JPN); Ryota Yamagata; Shota Iizuka; Shinji Takahira; Shota Hara	39.18	Q
2	Singapore (SIN); Calvin Kang; Gary Yeo; Lee Cheng Wei; Elfi Mustapa	39.80	Q
3	Hong Kong (HKG); Tang Yik Chun; Lai Chun Ho; Ng Ka Fung; Tsui Chi Ho	45.34	Q
—	Oman (OMA); Obaid Al-Quraini; Barakat Al-Harthi; Mohamed Obaid Al-Saadi; Yahya Al-Noufali	DSQ	
—	Qatar (QAT) — — — —	DNS	

=== Final ===
Rank	Team	Time	Notes
1st place, gold medalist(s)	China (CHN); Chen Shiwei; Xie Zhenye; Su Bingtian; Zhang Peimeng	37.99	AR
2nd place, silver medalist(s)	Japan (JPN); Ryota Yamagata; Shota Iizuka; Shinji Takahira; Kei Takase	38.49	
3rd place, bronze medalist(s)	Hong Kong (HKG); Tang Yik Chun; So Chun Hong; Ng Ka Fung; Tsui Chi Ho	38.98	
4	Thailand (THA); Ruttanapon Sowan; Aphisit Promkaew; Jirapong Meenapra; Kritsada Namsuwan	39.08	
5	Chinese Taipei (TPE); Yang Chun-han; Liu Yuan-kai; Wang Wen-tang; Lo Yen-yao	39.20	
6	Singapore (SIN); Calvin Kang; Gary Yeo; Lee Cheng Wei; Elfi Mustapa	39.47	
7	Macau (MAC); Pao Hin Fong; Leong Wang Kuong; Lao Iong; Iong Kim Fai	41.11	
—	South Korea (KOR); Yeo Ho-sua; Cho Kyu-won; Oh Kyong-soo; Kim Kuk-young	DSQ	
