= Thomas Gamble =

Thomas Gamble may refer to:

- Thomas Gamble (mayor) (1868–1945), historian and mayor of Savannah, Georgia
- Thomas Gamble (cricketer) (1800–?), English cricketer
- Thomas Evan Gamble (1883–1931), English-born farmer and political figure in Saskatchewan
- Tom Gamble (athlete) (born 1991), Australian sprinter
- Tom Gamble (racing driver) (born 2001), British racing driver
