= 2016 European Athletics Championships – Men's 200 metres =

Men's 200 metres at the 2016 European Athletics Championships
- Venue: Olympic Stadium
- Location: Amsterdam
- Dates: July 7 (round 1); July 8 (semi-finals & final)
- Competitors: 34 from 22 nations
- Winning time: 20.45

Medalists
| gold medal | Bruno Hortelano | Spain |
| silver medal | Ramil Guliyev | Turkey |
| bronze medal | Daniel Talbot | Great Britain |

The men's 200 metres at the 2016 European Athletics Championships took place at the Olympic Stadium on 7 and 8 July.

== Records ==
Standing records prior to the 2016 European Athletics Championships
| World record | Usain Bolt (JAM) | 19.19 | Berlin, Germany | 20 August 2009 |
| European record | Pietro Mennea (ITA) | 19.72 | Mexico City, Mexico | 12 September 1979 |
| Championship record | Konstantinos Kenteris (GRE) | 19.85 | Munich, Germany | 9 August 2002 |
| World Leading | LaShawn Merritt (USA) | 19.78 | Nassau, The Bahamas | 16 April 2016 |
| European Leading | Nethaneel Mitchell-Blake (GBR) | 19.95 | Tuscaloosa, United States | 14 May 2016 |

== Schedule ==
| Date | Time | Round |
|---|---|---|
| 7 July 2016 | 11:20 | Round 1 |
| 8 July 2016 | 18:50 | Semi-finals |
| 8 July 2016 | 20:35 | Final |

All times are local times (UTC+2)

== Results ==
=== Round 1 ===
First 3 (Q) and next 5 fastest (q) qualify for the semi-finals.

==== Heat 1 ====
| Rank | Lane | Athlete | Nation | Time | Notes |
|---|---|---|---|---|---|
| 1 | 7 | Bruno Hortelano | Spain | 20.55 | Q |
| 2 | 8 | Karol Zalewski | Poland | 20.69 | Q |
| 3 | 5 | Mickaël-Meba Zézé | France | 20.84 | Q |
| 4 | 6 | Johan Wissman | Sweden | 20.96 | q |
| 5 | 3 | Marcus Lawler | Ireland | 21.06 | q |
| 6 | 4 | Ionut Andrei Neagoe | Romania | 21.18 | |
| 7 | 2 | Zharnel Hughes | Great Britain | 21.21 | |
| 8 | 1 | Samuli Samuelsson | Finland | 21.36 | |
| | | | | Wind: -1.1 m/s | |

==== Heat 2 ====
| Rank | Lane | Athlete | Nation | Time | Notes |
|---|---|---|---|---|---|
| 1 | 4 | Alex Wilson | Switzerland | 20.80 | Q |
| 2 | 8 | Davide Manenti | Italy | 20.82 | Q |
| 3 | 1 | Ján Volko | Slovakia | 21.00 | Q |
| 4 | 6 | Hensley Paulina | Netherlands | 21.04 | q |
| 5 | 5 | Robin Erewa | Germany | 21.05 | q |
| 6 | 7 | Vitaliy Korzh | Ukraine | 21.49 | |
| 7 | 3 | Marek Niit | Estonia | 21.93 | |
| 8 | 2 | Mikel de Sa | Andorra | 22.74 | |
| | | | | Wind: -1.2 m/s | |

==== Heat 3 ====
| Rank | Lane | Athlete | Nation | Time | Notes |
|---|---|---|---|---|---|
| 1 | 2 | Solomon Bockarie | Netherlands | 20.55 | Q |
| 2 | 5 | David Lima | Portugal | 20.82 | Q |
| 3 | 8 | Antonio Infantino | Italy | 20.99 | Q |
| 4 | 3 | Tom Kling-Baptiste | Sweden | 21.06 | q |
| 5 | 1 | Igor Bodrov | Ukraine | 21.13 | |
| 6 | 4 | Robin Vanderbemden | Belgium | 21.17 | |
| 7 | 7 | Silvan Wicki | Switzerland | 21.41 | |
| 8 | 6 | Gábor Pásztor | Hungary | 21.60 | |
| | | | | Wind: -0.1 m/s | |

=== Semi-finals ===
First 2 (Q) and next 2 fastest (q) qualify for the final.

==== Heat 1 ====
| Rank | Lane | Athlete | Nation | Time | Notes |
|---|---|---|---|---|---|
| 1 | 5 | Ramil Guliyev* | Turkey | 20.69 | Q |
| 2 | 7 | Alex Wilson | Switzerland | 20.71 | Q |
| 3 | 3 | Jaysuma Saidy Ndure* | Norway | 20.92 | |
| 4 | 6 | Eseosa Desalu* | Italy | 20.94 | |
| 5 | 4 | Aleixo Platini Menga* | Germany | 21.06 | |
| 6 | 2 | Ján Volko | Slovakia | 21.28 | |
| 7 | 1 | Marcus Lawler | Ireland | 21.33 | |
| 8 | 8 | Hensley Paulina | Netherlands | 23.49 | |
| | | | | Wind: -1.7 m/s | |

==== Heat 2 ====
| Rank | Lane | Athlete | Nation | Time | Notes |
|---|---|---|---|---|---|
| 1 | 4 | Danny Talbot* | Great Britain | 20.37 | Q, SB |
| 2 | 3 | Churandy Martina* | Netherlands | 20.44 | Q |
| 3 | 5 | Davide Manenti | Italy | 20.46 | q |
| 4 | 7 | Karol Zalewski | Poland | 20.69 | |
| 5 | 8 | Mickaël-Meba Zézé | France | 20.81 | |
| 6 | 6 | Julian Reus* | Germany | 20.83 | |
| 7 | 2 | David Lima | Portugal | 20.86 | |
| – | 1 | Johan Wissman | Sweden | DNF | |
| | | | | Wind: -0.1 m/s | |

==== Heat 3 ====
| Rank | Lane | Athlete | Nation | Time | Notes |
|---|---|---|---|---|---|
| 1 | 7 | Bruno Hortelano | Spain | 20.39 | Q, NR |
| 2 | 6 | Solomon Bockarie | Netherlands | 20.39 | Q, PB |
| 3 | 3 | Nethaneel Mitchell-Blake* | Great Britain | 20.46 | q |
| 4 | 5 | Lykourgos-Stefanos Tsakonas* | Greece | 20.48 | |
| 5 | 4 | Serhiy Smelyk* | Ukraine | 20.76 | |
| 6 | 8 | Antonio Infantino | Italy | 20.93 | |
| 7 | 1 | Robin Erewa | Germany | 20.98 | |
| 8 | 2 | Tom Kling-Baptiste | Sweden | 21.34 | |
| | | | | Wind: -1.1 m/s | |

*Athletes who received a bye to the semi-finals

=== Final ===
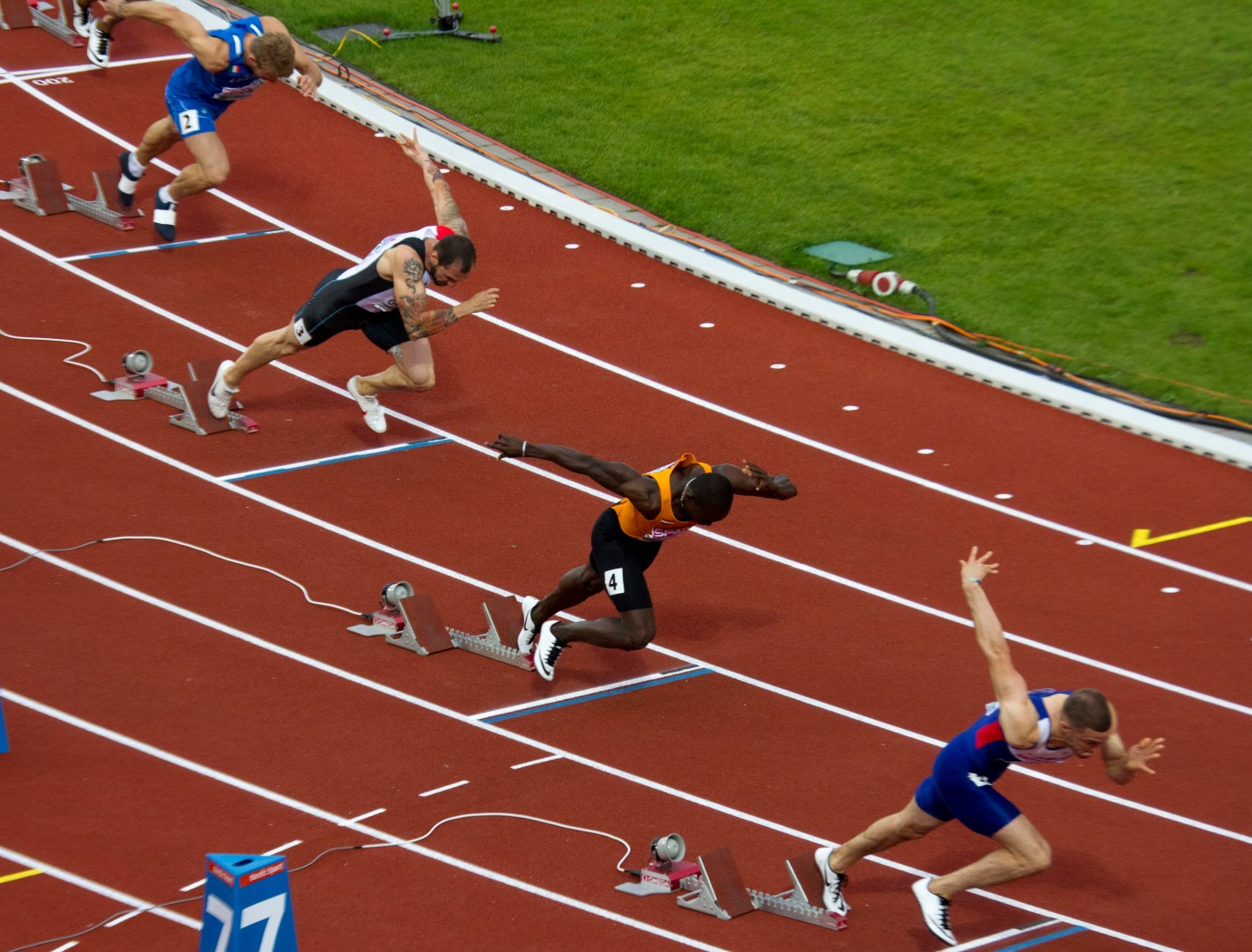
The start of the final

| Rank | Lane | Athlete | Nation | Time | Notes |
|---|---|---|---|---|---|
| 1st place, gold medalist(s) | 6 | Bruno Hortelano | Spain | 20.45 | |
| 2nd place, silver medalist(s) | 3 | Ramil Guliyev | Turkey | 20.51 | |
| 3rd place, bronze medalist(s) | 5 | Danny Talbot | Great Britain | 20.56 | |
| 4 | 4 | Solomon Bockarie | Netherlands | 20.56 | |
| 5 | 1 | Nethaneel Mitchell-Blake | Great Britain | 20.60 | |
| 6 | 2 | Davide Manenti | Italy | 20.66 | |
| 7 | 7 | Alex Wilson | Switzerland | 20.70 | |
| – | 8 | Churandy Martina | Netherlands | DQ | R163.3a |
| | | | | Wind: -0.9 m/s | |
