= 2009 European Athletics U23 Championships – Men's 200 metres =

The men's 200 metres event at the 2009 European Athletics U23 Championships was held in Kaunas, Lithuania, at S. Dariaus ir S. Girėno stadionas (Darius and Girėnas Stadium) on 17 and 18 July.

== Medalists ==
Gold	Toby Sandeman; United Kingdom
Silver	Alex-Platini Menga; Germany
Bronze	Igor Bodrov; Ukraine

== Results ==
=== Final ===
18 July
Wind: -0.2 m/s

Rank	Name	Nationality	Time	Notes
1st place, gold medalist(s)	Toby Sandeman	United Kingdom	20.37	
2nd place, silver medalist(s)	Alex-Platini Menga	Germany	20.59	
3rd place, bronze medalist(s)	Igor Bodrov	Ukraine	20.61	
4	Matteo Galvan	Italy	20.62	
5	Marek Niit	Estonia	20.88	
6	Dmytro Ostrovskyy	Ukraine	20.90	
7	Richard Kilty	United Kingdom	20.93	
8	Pierre-Alexis Pessonneaux	France	21.13	

=== Semifinals ===
18 July
Qualified: first 4 each to Final

==== Semifinal 1 ====
Rank	Name	Nationality	Time	Notes
1	Toby Sandeman	United Kingdom	20.80	Q
2	Igor Bodrov	Ukraine	20.95	Q
3	Matteo Galvan	Italy	20.98	Q
4	Pierre-Alexis Pessonneaux	France	21.07	Q
5	Mickaël Arminana	France	21.08	
6	Visa Hongisto	Finland	21.28	
7	Miloš Savić	Serbia	21.57	
8	Edgar Pérez	Spain	21.68	

==== Semifinal 2 ====
Wind: -0.7 m/s

Rank	Name	Nationality	Time	Notes
1	Alex-Platini Menga	Germany	20.61	Q
2	Marek Niit	Estonia	20.88	Q
3	Richard Kilty	United Kingdom	20.99	Q
4	Dmytro Ostrovskyy	Ukraine	21.03	Q
5	Kamil Kryński	Poland	21.11	
6	Bruno Naprix	France	21.35	
7	Ali Ekber Kayaş	Turkey	21.45	
8	Reto Schenkel	Switzerland	21.45	

=== Heats ===
17 July
Qualified: first 3 each heat and 4 best to Semifinals

==== Heat 1 ====
Wind: -0.4 m/s

Rank	Name	Nationality	Time	Notes
1	Marek Niit	Estonia	20.95	Q
2	Pierre-Alexis Pessonneaux	France	21.05	Q
3	Kamil Kryński	Poland	21.10	Q
4	Pascal Mancini	Switzerland	21.41	
5	Teo Turchi	Italy	21.74	
	Rytis Sakalauskas	Lithuania	DNS	

==== Heat 2 ====
Rank	Name	Nationality	Time	Notes
1	Toby Sandeman	United Kingdom	20.87	Q
2	Matteo Galvan	Italy	20.91	Q
3	Mickaël Arminana	France	21.25	Q
4	Ali Ekber Kayaş	Turkey	21.38	q
5	Javier Sanz	Spain	21.83	
6	Pavel Setin	Azerbaijan	21.96	
	Gil Sheleg	Israel	DQ	Rule 163.3

==== Heat 3 ====
Wind: 0.1 m/s

Rank	Name	Nationality	Time	Notes
1	Alex-Platini Menga	Germany	20.70	Q
2	Dmytro Ostrovskyy	Ukraine	21.03	Q
3	Visa Hongisto	Finland	21.17	Q
4	Miloš Savić	Serbia	21.40	q
5	Egidijus Dilys	Lithuania	21.43	
6	Davide Pelizzoli	Italy	21.44	
	Elvijs Misāns	Latvia	DNS	

==== Heat 4 ====
Wind: 0.3 m/s

Rank	Name	Nationality	Time	Notes
1	Igor Bodrov	Ukraine	20.94	Q
2	Richard Kilty	United Kingdom	21.19	Q
3	Bruno Naprix	France	21.27	Q
4	Reto Schenkel	Switzerland	21.41	q
5	Edgar Pérez	Spain	21.41	q
6	George Cristian Vulcu	Romania	21.75	

== Participation ==
According to an unofficial count, 24 athletes from 16 countries participated in the event.

- Azerbaijan (1)
- Estonia (1)
- Finland (1)
- France (3)
- Germany (1)
- Israel (1)
- Italy (3)
- Lithuania (1)
- Poland (1)
- Romania (1)
- Serbia (1)
- Spain (2)
- Switzerland (2)
- Turkey (1)
- Ukraine (2)
- United Kingdom (2)
