= Artur Zaczek =

Polish sprinter

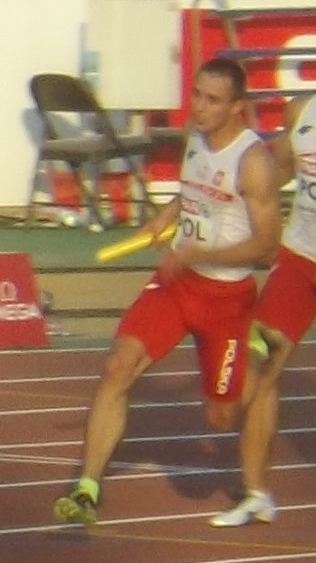
- Artur Zaczek in 2015

Personal information
- Born: 28 February 1989 (age 37) Łomża, Poland
- Education: College of Education and Therapy, Poznań
- Height: 1.82 m (6 ft 0 in)
- Weight: 77 kg (170 lb)

Sport
- Sport: Athletics
- Event(s): 100 metres, 200 metres
- Club: OŚ AZS Poznań
- Coached by: Tadeusz Osik
Medal record
Men's athletics
Representing Poland
European Athletics U23 Championships
Bronze medal – third place	2009 Kaunas	4 x 100 m

Artur Zaczek (born 28 February 1989) is a Polish athlete specialising in the sprinting events. He won a bronze medal in the 4 × 100 metres relay at the 2009 European U23 Championships in addition to three medals won in the same event at the Summer Universiades between 2009 and 2015. He was also an unused reserve runner at the 2012 Summer Olympics, as well as the 2011 and 2013 World Championships.

== International competitions ==
Year	Competition	Venue	Position	Event	Notes
Representing Poland
2007	European Junior Championships	Hengelo, Netherlands	11th (sf)	100 m	10.73
2007	European Junior Championships	Hengelo, Netherlands	1st (h)	4 × 100 m relay	40.23^{1}
2008	World Junior Championships	Bydgoszcz, Poland	39th (h)	100 m	10.86
2008	World Junior Championships	Bydgoszcz, Poland	12th (h)	4 × 100 m relay	40.61
2009	Universiade	Belgrade, Serbia	22nd (qf)	100 m	10.66
2009	Universiade	Belgrade, Serbia	2nd	4 × 100 m relay	39.33
2009	European U23 Championships	Novi Sad, Serbia	3rd	4 × 100 m relay	39.52
2011	European U23 Championships	Prague, Czech Republic	13th (sf)	200 m	21.30
2011	European U23 Championships	Prague, Czech Republic	4th	4 × 100 m relay	39.40
2013	Universiade	Kazan, Russia	16th (sf)	100 m	10.75
2013	Universiade	Kazan, Russia	3rd	4 × 100 m relay	39.29
2015	Universiade	Gwangju, South Korea	16th (qf)	200 m	21.28
2015	Universiade	Gwangju, South Korea	2nd	4 × 100 m relay	39.50
2017	IAAF World Relays	Nassau, Bahamas	17th (h)	4 × 100 m relay	39.84
2017	IAAF World Relays	Nassau, Bahamas	9th (h)	4 × 200 m relay	1:24.78
2017	Universiade	Taipei, Taiwan	18th (sf)	200 m	21.64
2017	Universiade	Taipei, Taiwan	–	4 × 100 m relay	DQ

^{1}Did not finish in the final

== Personal bests ==
Outdoor

- 100 metres – 10.47 (+1.6 m/s, Szczecin 2012)
- 200 metres – 20.76 (+0.9 m/s, Gdańsk 2015)

Indoor

- 60 metres – 6.75 (Vienna 2013)
- 200 metres – 21.48 (Spała 2010)
