= Takuya Nagata (athlete) =

Japanese sprinter (born 1993)

Personal information
- Nationality: Japanese
- Born: 14 June 1994 (age 32) Aichi Prefecture, Japan
- Education: Hosei University
- Height: 1.82 m (6 ft 0 in)
- Weight: 70 kg (150 lb)

Sport
- Sport: Track and field
- Event(s): 100 metres 200 metres 4×100 metres relay
- Club: Fujitsu Track & Field Team

Achievements and titles
- Personal best(s): 100 m: 10.14 (Hiratsuka 2018); 200 m: 20.57 (Osaka 2015)
Medal record
Men's athletics
Representing Japan
Universiade
| Gold medal – first place | 2015 Gwangju | 4×100 m relay |

Takuya Nagata (長田 拓也, Nagata Takuya; born 12 December 1993) is a Japanese sprinter. He competed in the 4 × 100 metres relay event at the 2015 World Championships in Athletics in Beijing, China.

== International competition ==
| Year | Competition | Venue | Position | Event | Time | Notes |
Representing Japan
| 2015 | Universiade | Gwangju, South Korea | 6th | 200 m | 20.90 (wind: -2.5 m/s) | |
| 2015 | Universiade | Gwangju, South Korea | 1st | 4×100 m relay | 39.08 (relay leg: 2nd) | |
| 2015 | World Championships | Beijing, China | 10th (h) | 4×100 m relay | 38.60 (relay leg: 3rd) | |
