= 2009 European Athletics U23 Championships – Men's 4 × 100 metres relay =

The men's 4 x 100 metres relay event at the 2009 European Athletics U23 Championships was held in Kaunas, Lithuania, at S. Dariaus ir S. Girėno stadionas (Darius and Girėnas Stadium) on 19 July.

== Medalists ==
Gold	Ryan Scott; Toby Sandeman; Rion Pierre; Leevan Yearwood; United Kingdom
Silver	Emmanuel Biron; Mickaël Arminana; Pierre-Alexis Pessonneaux; Teddy Tinmar; France
Bronze	Kamil Kryński; Artur Zaczek; Olaf Paruzel; Jakub Adamski; Poland

== Results ==
=== Final ===
19 July

Rank	Nation	Competitors	Time	Notes
1st place, gold medalist(s)	United Kingdom	Ryan Scott; Toby Sandeman; Rion Pierre; Leevan Yearwood	39.09	
2nd place, silver medalist(s)	France	Emmanuel Biron; Mickaël Arminana; Pierre-Alexis Pessonneaux; Teddy Tinmar	39.26	
3rd place, bronze medalist(s)	Poland	Kamil Kryński; Artur Zaczek; Olaf Paruzel; Jakub Adamski	39.52	
4	Italy	Davide Deimichei; Gavino Giacomo Dettori; Davide Pelizzoli; Francesco Garzia	39.72	
5	Netherlands	Adrian Rijken; Giovanni Codrington; Jerrel Feller; Frits Frederiks	39.72	
6	Switzerland	Pascal Mancini; Benjamin Sunier; Kwasi Asante Ofosu; Reto Schenkel	39.73	
7	Germany	Maximilian Panthen; Christian Blum; Kevin Sellke; Alwin Flohr	40.06	
8	Portugal	Ivo Vital; Marcos Chuva; Edi Sousa; Bruno Gualberto	40.36	

=== Heats ===
19 July
Qualified: first 3 in each heat and 2 to the Final

==== Heat 1 ====
Rank	Nation	Competitors	Time	Notes
1	France	Emmanuel Biron; Mickaël Arminana; Pierre-Alexis Pessonneaux; Teddy Tinmar	39.77	Q
2	Switzerland	Pascal Mancini; Benjamin Sunier; Kwasi Asante Ofosu; Reto Schenkel	40.06	Q
3	Netherlands	Adrian Rijken; Giovanni Codrington; Jerrel Feller; Frits Frederiks	40.13	Q
4	Portugal	Ivo Vital; Marcos Chuva; Edi Sousa; Bruno Gualberto	40.21	q
5	Germany	Maximilian Panthen; Christian Blum; Alwin Flohr; Kevin Sellke	40.22	q

==== Heat 2 ====
Rank	Nation	Competitors	Time	Notes
1	United Kingdom	Ryan Scott; Toby Sandeman; Rion Pierre; Leevan Yearwood	39.85	Q
2	Poland	Kamil Kryński; Jakub Adamski; Olaf Paruzel; Artur Zaczek	40.04	Q
3	Italy	Davide Deimichei; Gavino Giacomo Dettori; Davide Pelizzoli; Francesco Garzia	40.12	Q
4	Lithuania	Egidijus Dilys; Rytis Sakalauskas; Martas Skrabulis; Aivaras Pranckevičius	40.23	
5	Spain	José Antonio Andújar; Edgar Pérez; Sergio Ruiz; Javier Planas	40.67	

== Participation ==
According to an unofficial count, 40 athletes from 10 countries participated in the event.

- France (4)
- Germany (4)
- Italy (4)
- Lithuania (4)
- Netherlands (4)
- Poland (4)
- Portugal (4)
- Spain (4)
- Switzerland (4)
- United Kingdom (4)
