= Yang Yang (sprinter) =

Chinese sprinter

Yang Yang (Chinese: 杨洋; born 26 June 1991 in Shangrao, Jiangxi province) is a Chinese athlete specialising in the sprinting events. He won the silver medal with the Chinese 4 × 100 metres relay at the 2011 Summer Universiade.

A student of broadcasting at the Beijing University, he represented his country at three consecutive Summer Universiades.

== Competition record ==
Year	Competition	Venue	Position	Event	Notes
Representing China
2011	Universiade	Shenzhen, China	2nd	4 × 100 m relay	39.39
2013	Universiade	Kazan, Russia	13th (sf)	100 m	10.59
2013	Universiade	Kazan, Russia	5th	4 × 100 m relay	39.54
2014	IAAF World Relays	Nassau, Bahamas	11th (B)	4 × 100 m relay	38.83
2014	IAAF World Relays	Nassau, Bahamas	7th	4 × 200 m relay	1:25.83
2014	Asian Games	Incheon, South Korea	2nd (h)	4 × 100 m relay	39.07
2015	IAAF World Relays	Nassau, Bahamas	21st (h)	4 × 100 m relay	57.98
2015	IAAF World Relays	Nassau, Bahamas	–	4 × 200 m relay	DQ
2015	Asian Championships	Wuhan, China	5th	100 m	10.27
2015	Universiade	Gwangju, South Korea	8th	100 m	10.41
2015	Universiade	Gwangju, South Korea	6th	4 × 100 m relay	40.12

== Personal bests ==
Outdoor

- 100 metres – 10.24 (+1.8 m/s) (Gwangju 2015)

Indoor

- 60 metres – 6.55 (Nanjing 2016)
