= Tom Gamble (athlete) =

Australian sprinter (born 1991)

Personal information
- Born: 25 November 1991 (age 34)
- Education: University of Queensland
- Height: 1.98 m (6 ft 6 in)
- Weight: 70 kg (154 lb)

Sport
- Sport: Athletics
- Event: 100 metres
- Coached by: Peter Gamble

Thomas Gamble (born 25 November 1991) is an Australian sprinter competing mostly in the 100 metres. He represented his country in the 4 × 100 metres relay at the 2017 World Championships without qualifying for the final.

His personal bests are 10.28 seconds in the 100 metres (+0.3 m/s, Gwangju 2015) and 20.61 seconds in the 200 metres (+0.9 m/s, Canberra 2017).

== International competitions ==
Year	Competition	Venue	Position	Event	Notes
Representing Australia
2010	World Junior Championships	Moncton, Canada	–	4 × 100 m relay	DNF
2013	Universiade	Kazan, Russia	17th (qf)	100 m	10.60
2013	Universiade	Kazan, Russia	5th	4 × 400 m relay	3:08.82
2015	Universiade	Gwangju, South Korea	8th (sf)	100 m	10.28
2015	Universiade	Gwangju, South Korea	4th	4 × 100 m relay	39.71
2017	IAAF World Relays	Nassau, The Bahamas	4th	4 × 100 m relay	39.73
2017	World Championships	London, United Kingdom	12th (h)	4 × 100 m relay	38.88
