= Ryota Yamagata =

Japanese sprinter (born 1992)

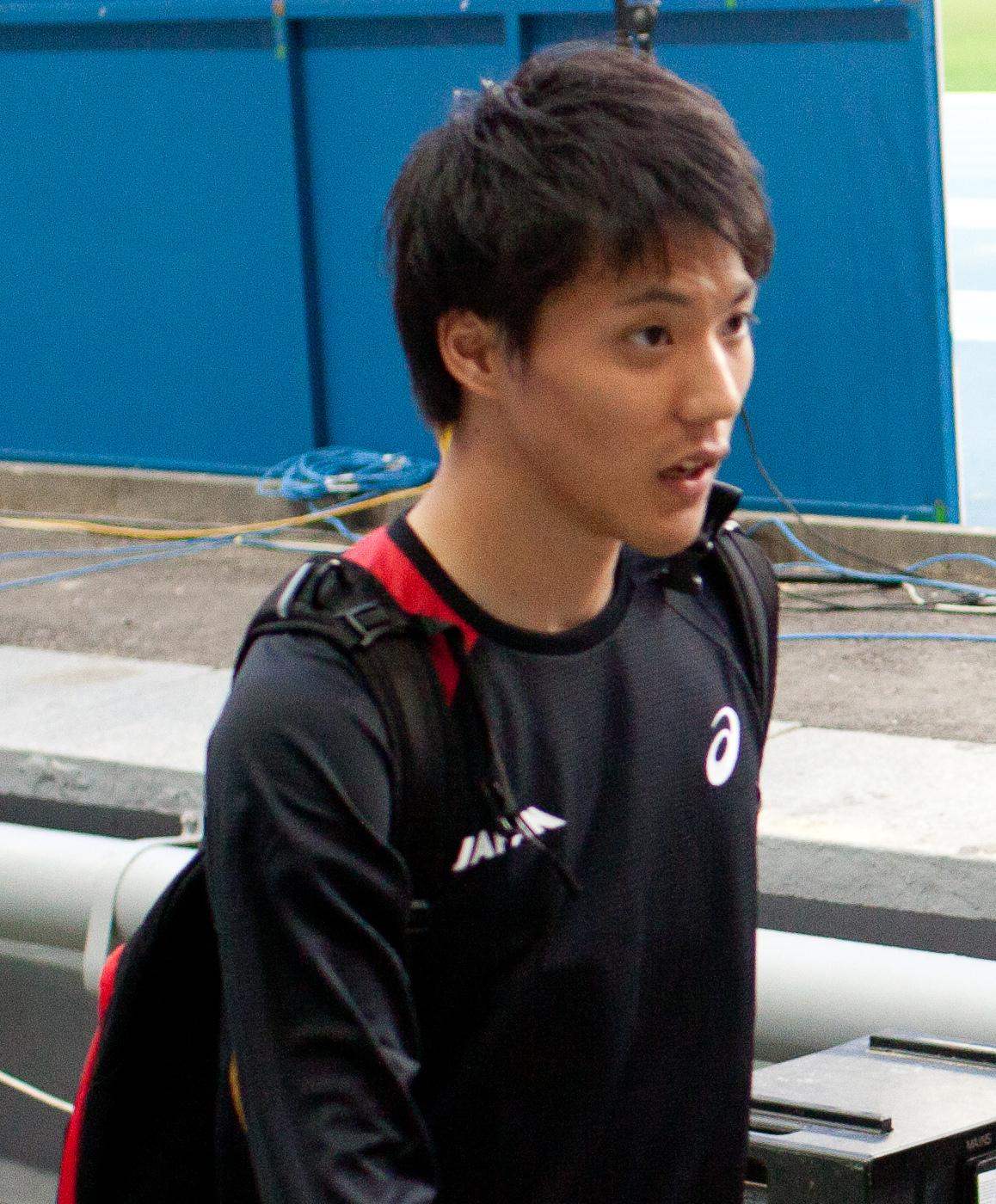
- Yamagata at the 2013 World Championships

Personal information
- Nationality: Japan
- Born: 10 June 1992 (age 34) Hiroshima, Hiroshima Prefecture, Japan
- Height: 1.77 m (5 ft 9 1/2 in)
- Weight: 154 lb (70 kg)

Sport
- Country: Japan
- Sport: Athletics
- Event: Sprints
- University team: Keio University
- Club: Seiko AC

Achievements and titles
- Personal bests: 60 m: 6.62 (Osaka 2016); 100 m: 9.95 (Tottori 2021); 200 m: 20.41 (Yokohama 2013)
Medal record
Olympic Games
Silver medal – second place	2016 Rio de Janeiro	4×100 m relay
Summer Universiade
Silver medal – second place	2013 Kazan	100 m
Silver medal – second place	2013 Kazan	4×100 m relay
Asian Games
Silver medal – second place	2014 Incheon	4×100 m relay
Gold medal – first place	2018 Jakarta-Palembang	4 × 100 m relay
Bronze medal – third place	2018 Jakarta-Palembang	100 m
East Asian Games
Gold medal – first place	2013 Tianjin	4×100 m relay
Silver medal – second place	2013 Tianjin	100 m
World Youth Championships
Bronze medal – third place	2009 Brixen	Medley relay

Ryota Yamagata (山縣 亮太, Yamagata Ryōta; born 10 June 1992) is a Japanese sprinter holding the Japanese record of 9.95 in the 100m.

He won the bronze medal in the medley relay at the 2009 World Youth Championships in Athletics.

In the 2016 Olympic Games in Rio de Janeiro, Yamagata was part of the 4 × 100 m relay team for Japan, which took the silver medal in the final.

He served as the captain of Japan's team at the Tokyo 2020 Summer Olympics.

== Personal bests ==
Event	Time	Wind	Venue	Date	Notes
Outdoor
100 m	09.95 s	+2.0 m/s	Tottori, Japan	6 June 2021	Japanese record
200 m	20.41 s	−0.5 m/s	Yokohama, Japan	26 May 2013	
Indoor
60 m	6.62 s		Osaka, Japan	13 March 2016	

== Records ==
- 100 metres
  - Current Japanese record holder - 9.95 s (wind: +2.0 m/s) (Tottori, 6 June 2021)
  - Former Japanese junior record holder – 10.23 s (wind: +1.8 m/s) (Yamaguchi, 8 October 2011)
- 4 × 100 m relay
  - Current Asian and Japanese record holder – 37.60 s (relay leg: 1st) (Rio de Janeiro, 19 August 2016)^{[a]}
  - Current Japanese university record holder – 38.44 s (relay leg:1st) (Tianjin, 9 October 2013)^{[b]}
- 60 metres (Indoor)
  - Former Japanese junior record holder – 6.71 s (Osaka, 5 February 2011)

^{a} with Shōta Iizuka, Yoshihide Kiryū, and Asuka Cambridge
^{b} with Shōta Iizuka, Asuka Cambridge, and Kazuma Ōseto

== Competition record ==
Year	Competition	Venue	Position	Event	Notes
2009	World Youth Championships	Brixen, Italy	4th	100 m	10.80 (wind: -1.2 m/s)
2009	World Youth Championships	Brixen, Italy	3rd	Medley relay	1:52.82 (relay leg: 2nd)
2012	Olympic Games	London, United Kingdom	13th (sf)	100 m	10.10 (wind: +1.7 m/s)
2012	Olympic Games	London, United Kingdom	4th	4 × 100 m relay	38.35 (relay leg: 1st)
2013	Universiade	Kazan, Russia	2nd	100 m	10.21 (wind: +0.5 m/s)
2013	Universiade	Kazan, Russia	2nd	4 × 100 m relay	39.12 (relay leg: 1st)
2013	World Championships	Moscow, Russia	22nd (h)	100 m	10.21 (wind: -0.4 m/s)
2013	East Asian Games	Tianjin, China	2nd	100 m	10.31 (wind: -0.1 m/s)
2013	East Asian Games	Tianjin, China	1st	4 × 100 m relay	38.44 (relay leg: 1st) GR, NUR
2014	Asian Games	Incheon, South Korea	6th	100 m	10.26 (wind: +0.4 m/s)
2014	Asian Games	Incheon, South Korea	2nd	4 × 100 m relay	38.49 (relay leg: 1st)
2016	Olympic Games	Rio de Janeiro, Brazil	11th (sf)	100 m	10.05 (wind: +0.2 m/s) PB
2016	Olympic Games	Rio de Janeiro, Brazil	2nd	4 × 100 m relay	37.60 (relay leg: 1st) AR
2018	Asian Games	Jakarta, Indonesia	2nd	100 m	10.00 (wind: +0.4 m/s)
2018	Asian Games	Jakarta, Indonesia	1st	4 × 100 m relay	38.16 (relay leg: 1st)
2019	Asian Championships	Doha, Qatar	4th (sf)	100 m	10.18^{1} (wind: +1.2 m/s)
2019	World Relays	Yokohama, Japan	–	4 × 100 m relay	DQ
2021	Olympic Games	Tokyo, Japan	24th (h)	100 m	10.15 (wind: +0.1 m/s)
2021	Olympic Games	Tokyo, Japan	9th (h)	4 × 100 m relay	38.16^{2} (relay leg: 2nd)

^{1}Did not start in the final
^{2}Did not finish in the final

=== National Championship ===
Year	Competition	Venue	Position	Event	Notes
2011	Japan Championships	Kumagaya, Saitama	4th	100 m	10.52 (wind: -0.5 m/s)
2011	Japan Championships	Kumagaya, Saitama	6th	200 m	20.84 (wind: 0.0 m/s)
2012	Japan Championships	Osaka, Osaka	3rd	100 m	10.34 (wind: 0.0 m/s)
2013	Japan Championships	Chōfu, Tokyo	1st	100 m	10.11 (wind: +0.7 m/s)
2014	Japan Championships	Fukushima, Fukushima	2nd	100 m	10.27 (wind: +0.6 m/s)
2015	Japan Championships	Niigata, Niigata	– (sf)	100 m	DNS
2016	Japan Championships	Nagoya, Aichi	2nd	100 m	10.17 (wind: -0.3 m/s)
2017	Japan Championships	Osaka, Osaka	6th	100 m	10.39 (wind: +0.6 m/s)
