= Thomas Gamble (cricketer) =

English cricketer

Personal information
- Full name: Thomas Gamble
- Born: 21 June 1800; Leicester
- Died: Unknown
- Role: Batsman

Domestic team information
- Years: Team
- 1826: Sheffield and Leicester
- 1825–1829: Leicester Cricket Club
- Source: CricInfo, 18 June 2013

Thomas Gamble (born 21 June 1800) was an English cricketer who was recorded in one match in 1826 when he played for a combined Sheffield and Leicester team, scoring 61 runs in his only innings and holding one catch. Gamble played for Leicester Cricket Club from 1825 to 1829.
