= Kamil Kryński =

Polish sprinter (born 1987)

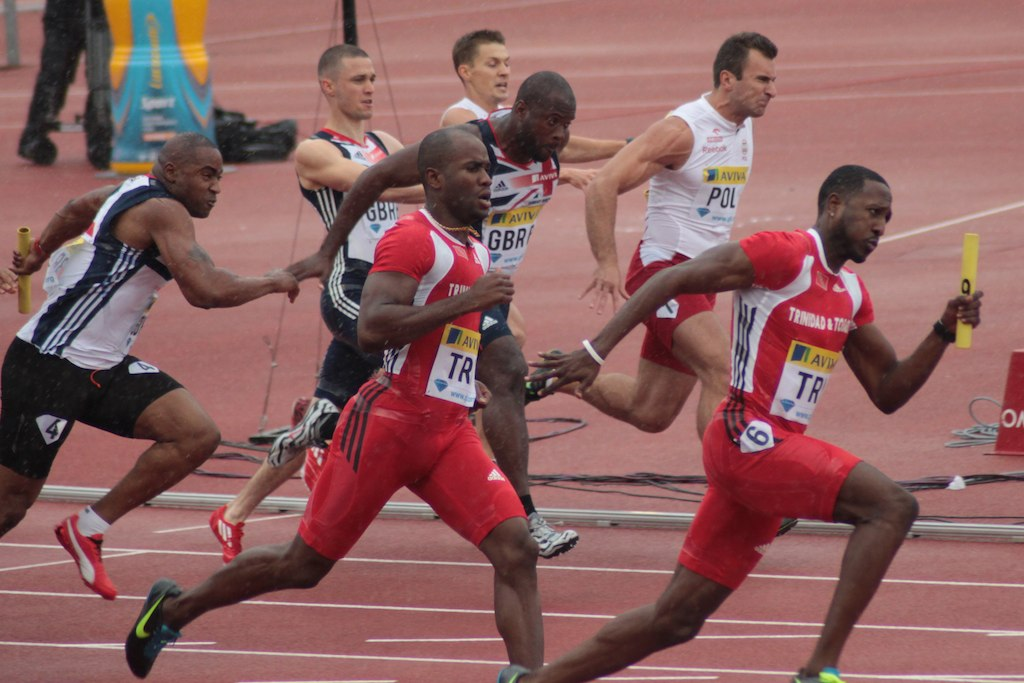
- Kamil Kryński (second from right) during a relay race.

Personal information
- Nationality: Poland
- Born: 12 May 1987 (age 39)
- Height: 1.87 m (6 ft 2 in)
- Weight: 88 kg (194 lb)

Sport
- Sport: Running
- Events: 100 metres, 200 metres
- Club: KS Podlasie Białystok
Medal record
Men's athletics
Representing Poland
European Athletics U23 Championships
Bronze medal – third place	2009 Kaunas	4 x 100 m
Universiade
Silver medal – second place	2015 Gwangju	4 × 100 m relay
Bronze medal – third place	2013 Kazan	4 × 100 m relay

Kamil Kryński (born 12 May 1987) is a Polish sprinter who specializes in the 200 metres. His biggest success to date is finishing 4th in the 4 x 100 metres relay final at the 2011 World Championships in Daegu, South Korea.

== Competition record ==
Year	Competition	Venue	Position	Event	Notes
2009	European U23 Championships	Kaunas, Lithuania	10th (sf)	200 m	21.11
2009	European U23 Championships	Kaunas, Lithuania	3rd	4 × 100 m relay	39.52
2010	European Championships	Barcelona, Spain	10th (sf)	200 m	20.81
2010	European Championships	Barcelona, Spain	5th	4 × 100 m relay	38.83
2011	World Championships	Daegu, South Korea	4th	4 × 100 m relay	38.50
2012	European Championships	Helsinki, Finland	13th (sf)	200 m	20.93
2012	European Championships	Helsinki, Finland	–	4 × 100 m relay	DNF
2012	Olympic Games	London, United Kingdom	20th (sf)	200 m	20.83
2012	Olympic Games	London, United Kingdom	9th (q)	4 × 100 m relay	38.31
2013	Universiade	Kazan, Russia	7th	200 m	20.94 (w)
2013	Universiade	Kazan, Russia	3rd	4 × 100 m relay	39.29
2013	World Championships	Moscow, Russia	11th (h)	4 × 100 m relay	38.51
2015	European Indoor Championships	Prague, Czech Republic	16th (sf)	60 m	6.69
2015	Universiade	Gwangju, South Korea	2nd	4 × 100 m relay	39.50

== Personal bests ==
Outdoor

- 100m – 10.33 (2012)
- 200m – 20.56 (2012)
- 400m – 47.68 (2008)

Indoor

- 60m – 6.69 (2011)
- 200m – 21.11 (2013)
