= Serhiy Smelyk =

Ukrainian sprinter

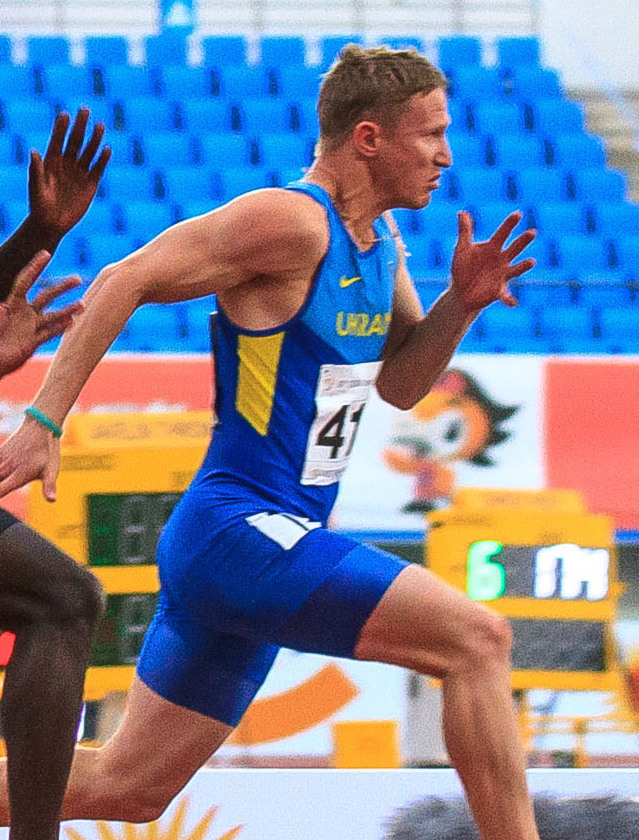
- Smelyk at the 2015 Military World Games

Medal record

Men's athletics

Representing Ukraine

European Championships
Bronze medal – third place	2014 Zürich	200 m

European Team Championships
Gold medal – first place	2015 Cheboksary	200 m
Gold medal – first place	2017 Lille	200 m
Bronze medal – third place	2013 Gateshead	200 m

Serhiy Volodymyrovych Smelyk or Serhii Volodymyrovych Smelyk (Ukrainian: Сергій Володимирович Смелик; born 19 April 1987 in Krasnodon) is a Ukrainian sprinter. He won the bronze medal in the 200 metres at the 2014 European Championships.

He has personal bests of 10.10 in the 100 metres (Erzurum 2016) and 20.30 in the 200 metres (Zürich 2014).

== Achievements ==
Year	Competition	Venue	Position	Event	Notes
Representing Ukraine
2012	European Championships	Helsinki, Finland	5th	100 m	10.34
2012	European Championships	Helsinki, Finland	–	200 m	DQ
2012	Olympic Games	London, United Kingdom	22nd (h)	200 m	20.65
2013	Universiade	Kazan, Russia	4th	100 m	10.21
2013	Universiade	Kazan, Russia	1st	4 × 100 m relay	38.56
2013	World Championships	Moscow, Russia	10th	200 m	20.42
2013	World Championships	Moscow, Russia	12th	4 × 100 m relay	38.57
2014	World Relays	Nassau, Bahamas	9th	4 × 100 m relay	38.53
2014	European Championships	Zürich, Switzerland	3rd	200 m	20.30
2014	European Championships	Zürich, Switzerland	9th	4 × 100 m relay	39.03
2015	World Championships	Beijing, China	37th (h)	200 m	20.60
2015	World Championships	Beijing, China	11th (h)	4 × 100 m relay	38.79
2016	European Championships	Amsterdam, Netherlands	11th (sf)	200 m	20.76
2016	Olympic Games	Rio de Janeiro, Brazil	52nd (h)	200 m	20.66
2017	World Championships	London, United Kingdom	23rd (h)	200 m	20.58
2017	DécaNation	Angers, France	3rd	200 m	20.97
2018	European Championships	Berlin, Germany	12th (sf)	200 m	20.54
2018	European Championships	Berlin, Germany	5th	4 × 100 m relay	38.71
2019	World Relays	Yokohama, Japan	14th (h)	4 × 100 m relay	38.84
2019	Balkan Championships	Pravets, Bulgaria	1st	200 m	20.50
2019	World Championships	Doha, Qatar	18th (sf)	200 m	20.55
2021	World Relays	Chorzów, Poland	9th (h)	4 × 100 m relay	39.06
2021	Olympic Games	Tokyo, Japan	17th (h)	200 m	20.53
2022	European Championships	Munich, Germany	14th (h)	4 × 100 m relay	39.62
