= Calvin Kang Li Loong =

Singaporean sprinter (born 1990)

Calvin Kang
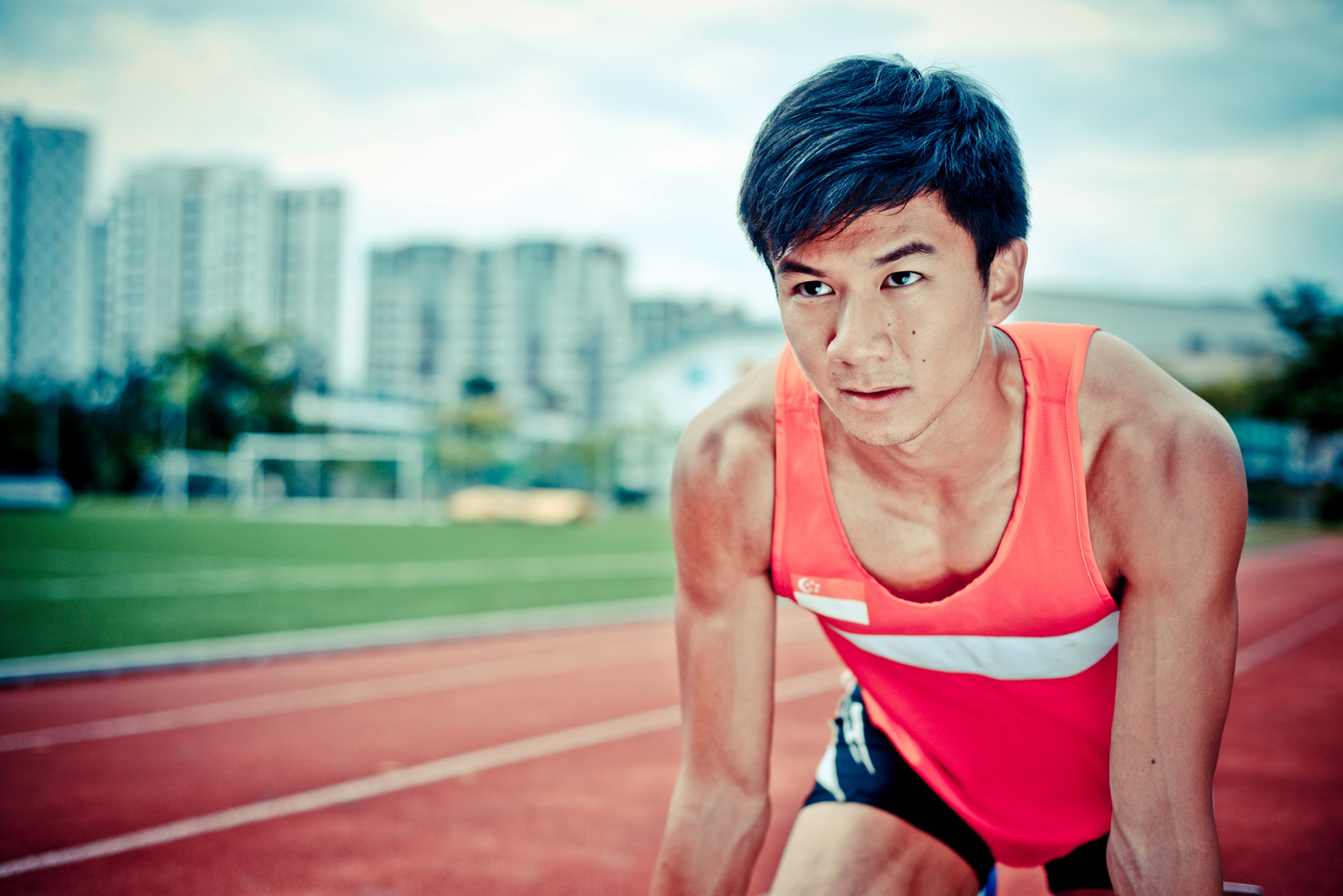
- Kang in 2013

Personal information
- Full name: Kang Li Loong
- National team: Singapore
- Born: 16 April 1990 (age 36) Singapore
- Height: 1.75 m (5 ft 9 in)
- Weight: 64 kg (141 lb)
Medal record
Men's athletics
Representing Singapore
Southeast Asian Games
Silver medal – second place	2011 Jakarta	4 × 100 m relay
Silver medal – second place	2015 Singapore	4 × 100m relay

Calvin Kang (born Kang Li Loong, (Note: Chinese: 江利龙; pinyin: Jiāng Lì Lóng; IPA: [tɕjáŋ lî lʊ̌ŋ].) 16 April 1990) is a track and field sprint athlete who competes internationally for Singapore. He specialises in the 100m sprint, but also runs the 200m and 4 × 100 m events

== Personal life ==
Kang attended Victoria School and Singapore Sports School. Upon graduation from Singapore Sports School, Kang entered Nanyang Technological University to pursue his undergraduate degree in sport science and management in 2011 before deciding to defer his studies to train professionally in 2013.

== Career ==
He represented Singapore at the 2008 Summer Olympics in Beijing in the 100m sprint and placed 6th in his heat without advancing to the second round. He ran a time of 10.73 seconds, 0.2 seconds outside his national junior record time of 10.53 seconds. Kang has represented Singapore at four major competitions – Southeast Asian Games (Nakhon Ratchasima, 2007), Summer Olympic Games (Beijing, 2008), Commonwealth Games (Delhi, 2010) and Asian Games (Guangzhou, 2010), making him the only Singaporean athlete to do so before the age of 20.

In the 2011 Southeast Asian Games held in Indonesia, Kang ran in the 4 × 100 m relay with his teammates and achieved the silver medal with a timing of 39.91 seconds.

In August 2013, Kang was the sole representative of Singapore in the IAAF World Championships 2013 held in Moscow. Clocking a time of 10.52 seconds in the men's 100m event, Kang finished first in heat 4 of the preliminaries and equalled his personal best. He later ran a time of 10.66 seconds in his heat.

In the 2015 Southeast Asian Games held in Singapore, Kang and his team, consisting of Muhammad Amirudin, Lee Cheng Wei and Gary Yeo, set a new national record of 39.24 seconds for the 4 × 100 m relay, beating the previous record of 39.45 seconds. The timing earned them a silver medal, narrowly losing the gold medal to the Thai team. Kang also ran a personal best 100m timing of 10.47 seconds, but missed out on a podium placing as he came in 4th.

Kang has had the backing of several notable sponsors such as MILO (under Nestle Singapore) from 2008 to 2014 and 100PLUS in 2015 to present. He has been featured prominently in their campaigns, and was affectionately known as the "MILO boy" for the duration of his MILO sponsorship.

Besides excelling at athletics, Kang has ventured into several entrepreneurship undertakings, such as the director of community partnerships in Shiok SG, a local social enterprise, and the lead trainer at The Impressionist, an agency that specialises in imparting interview skills.
