= Gideon Trotter =

South African sprinter

Personal information
- Nationality: South Africa
- Born: 3 March 1992 (age 34)

Sport
- Sport: Athletics
- Event(s): 100 metres, 200 metres

Achievements and titles
- Personal best(s): 100 m: 10.24 (Port Elizabeth 2014); 200 m: 20.83 (Germiston 2011)
Medal record
Men's athletics
Representing South Africa
African Junior Championships
Gold medal – first place	2011 Gaborone	100 m
Bronze medal – third place	2011 Gaborone	4×400 m relay

Gideon Trotter (born 3 March 1992) is a South African sprinter who specialises in the 100 metres.

Trotter won a gold medal in the 100 metres at the 2011 African Junior Athletics Championships in Gaborone, Botswana.

== Personal best ==
Distance	Time	venue
100 m	10.24 s A	Port Elizabeth, South Africa (21 March 2014)
200 m	20.83 s A	Germiston, South Africa (4 April 2011)
