= Gary Yeo =

Singaporean sprinter

Yeo Foo Ee Gary
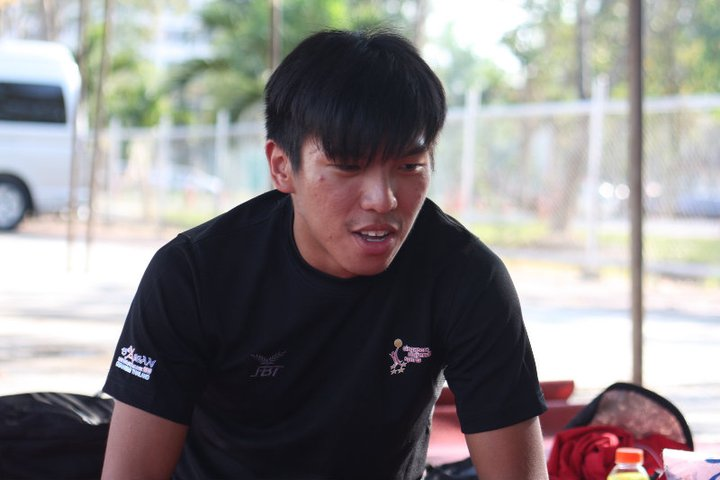

Personal information
- National team: Singapore
- Born: 30 August 1986 (age 39) Singapore
Medal record
Athletics (sport)
Representing Singapore
Southeast Asian Games
Silver medal – second place	2009 Vientiane	4 x 100 m relay
Silver medal – second place	2011 Palembang	100 m sprint
Silver medal – second place	2011 Palembang	4 x 100 m relay
Silver medal – second place	2013 Naypyidaw	4 x 100 m relay
Silver medal – second place	2015 Singapore	4 x 100 m relay
ASEAN University Games
Gold medal – first place	2012 Vientiane	100 m sprint
Bronze medal – third place	2010 Chang Mai	4x100 m relay

Yeo Foo Ee Gary (born 30 August 1986) is a former track and field sprint athlete who competed internationally for Singapore. Yeo is a 5-time SEA Games Silver medalist and the 2012 ASEAN University Games 100m Champion. Yeo also represented Singapore in athletics at the 2012 London Olympics, as well as the 2010 and 2014 Asian Games. He was the flag bearer for Singapore at the 2014 Asian Games.

Yeo won the silver medal in the Men's 100 metres at the 2011 Southeast Asian Games.

In 2012, Yeo represented Singapore at the 2012 Summer Olympics. In the men's 100m preliminary round, he broke his personal best timing of 10.62secs to 10.57secs to qualify for Round 1. He subsequently finished last in his heat and did not qualify for the next round.

In the same year, Yeo won the gold medal in the 100m sprint at the 2012 ASEAN University Games, lowering his personal best timing to 10.44secs as well as qualifying for the SEA Games 2013 in the process.

In 2013, Yeo started training full-time and broke the 4 × 100 m relay record in May with a timing of 39.45secs.

At the 2015 Southeast Asian Games, Yeo was part of the quartet that rewrote the national 4 × 100 m record, finishing 2nd behind Thailand with a time of 39.24s.

Yeo was a former student of Victoria School and is now studying business at the Singapore Management University.
