= Jirapong Meenapra =

Thai sprinter (born 1993)

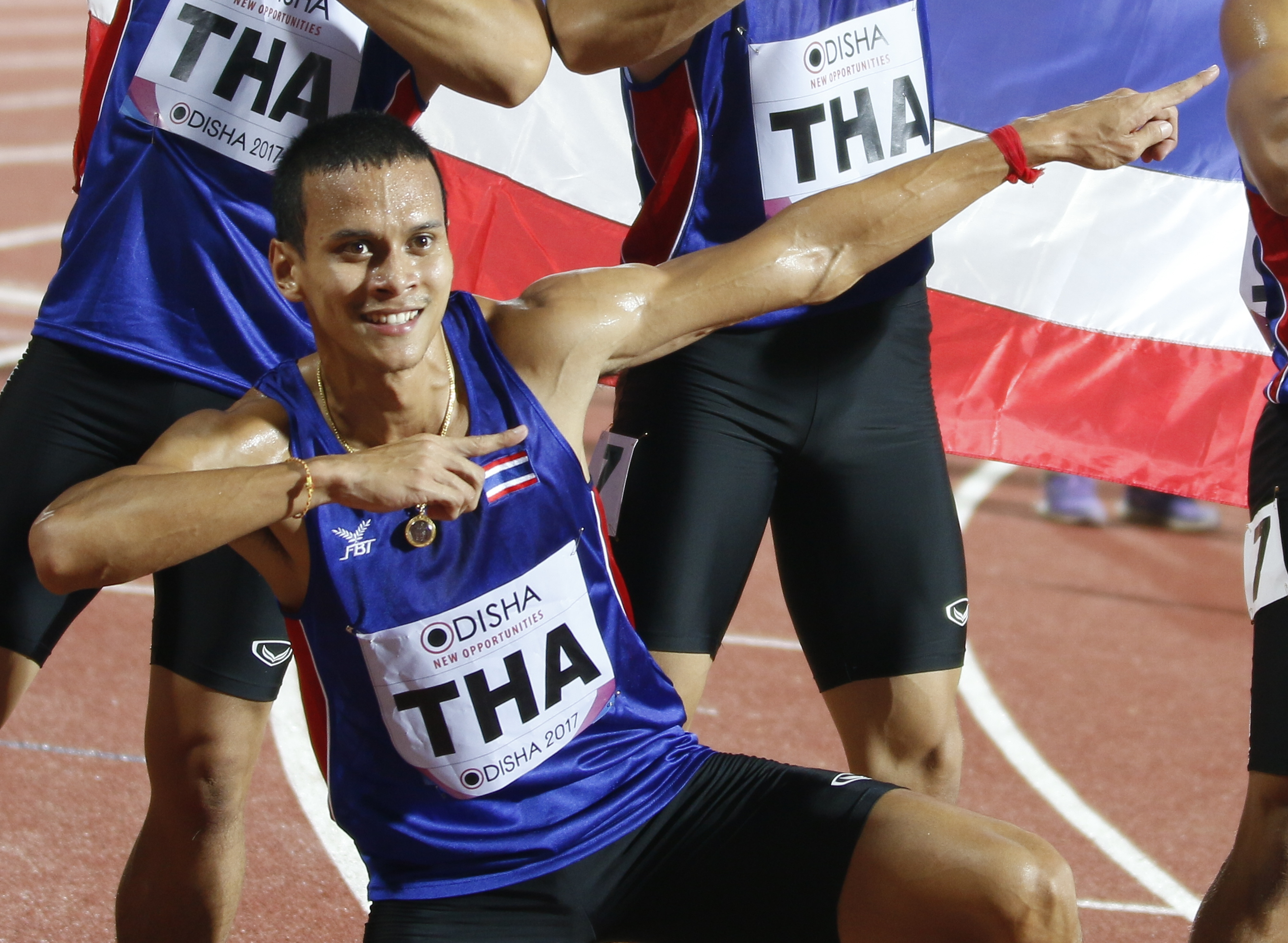
- Jirapong Meenapra in 2017

Personal information
- Nationality: Thailand
- Born: 11 May 1993 (age 33) Surat Thani, Thailand
- Height: 1.76 m (5 ft 9 in)
- Weight: 70 kg (154 lb)

Sport
- Sport: Running
- Event(s): 100 metres, 200 metres
Medal record
Men's athletics
Representing Thailand
Asian Games
Bronze medal – third place	2010 Guangzhou	4×100 m relay
Asian Championships
Gold medal – first place	2019 Doha	4×100 m relay
Asian Youth Games
Gold medal – first place	2009 Singapore	4×200 m relay
Southeast Asian Games
Gold medal – first place	2013 Naypyidaw	100 m
Gold medal – first place	2013 Naypyidaw	200 m
Gold medal – first place	2013 Naypyidaw	4×100 m relay
Gold medal – first place	2015 Singapore	4×100 m relay
Gold medal – first place	2017 Kuala Lumpur	4×100 m relay
Gold medal – first place	2019 Philippines	4×100 m relay
Silver medal – second place	2017 Kuala Lumpur	200 m
Bronze medal – third place	2015 Singapore	100 m

Jirapong Meenapra (Thai: จิระพงศ์ มีนาพระ; RTGS: Chiraphong Minaphra; born 11 May 1993) is a Thai sprinter who specialises in the 100 metres. He was born in Surat Thani, Thailand.

At the inaugural 2010 Summer Youth Olympics, he finished fifth in the 100 metres.

Olympic Games
Preceded by None	Flagbearer for Thailand; Singapore 2010	Succeeded by Vitsanu Phosri
