= Ihor Bodrov =

Ukrainian sprinter

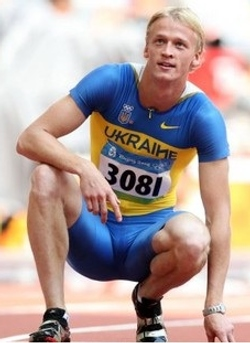
- Ihor Bodrov at the 2008 Olympics

Personal information
- Born: 9 July 1987 (age 39) Kharkiv, Ukrainian SSR, Soviet Union
- Height: 1.83 m (6 ft 0 in)
- Weight: 78 kg (172 lb)

Sport
- Sport: Athletics
- Events: 60 metres, 100 metres, 200 metres, 4 × 100 m relay
- Club: Dynamo
- Coached by: Valery Bodrov; Nadya Bodrova; Oleg Mukhin

Achievements and titles
- Personal bests: 60 m: 6.65 (Symu (UKR) 2008) 100 m: 10.28 (Znamensky (RUS) 2013); 200 m: 20.49 (Kirovograd 2014) 4 × 100 m relay: 38.53 (Nassau 2014)
Medal record
Representing Ukraine
2009 European Athletics U23 Championships
Bronze medal – third place	2009 Kaunas	200 m
2008 European Cup (athletics)
Gold medal – first place	2008 1st League, Istanbul	4 × 100 m relay
Bronze medal – third place	2008 1st League, Istanbul	200 m
Summer Universiade
Gold medal – first place	2013 Kazan	4 × 100 m relay

Ihor Bodrov (Ukrainian: І́гор Вале́рійович Бодро́в; born 9 July 1987) is a Ukrainian sprinter.

== Career ==
Bodrov began his sport career at the 34th International Children's Games, held in Plock, Poland, in 2002. When he took the gold medal in the 100 m, his result was 11.61 seconds. He finished fourth in the 200 m at the 2006 World Junior Championships, setting his personal best at 21.17 seconds. He also competed at the 2008 World Indoor Championships and the 2008 Olympic Games without reaching the final.

At the 2009 European Athletics U23 Championships, he placed third over 200 m, improving his personal record to 20.61 seconds. At the 2010 European Team Championships, he finished fourth with a time of 20.77 seconds.

He won a gold medal in the 4 × 100 m relay at the 2013 Summer Universiade, where he also placed fifth in the individual 100 m with a time of 10.29 seconds.

== Personal life ==
Bodrov is trained by his parents Valery Bodrov and Nadya Bodrova, both being former international runners. Nadya competed in two Olympic games, coached by her husband. As a result, Bodrov literally grew up on the stadium and can not recall when he began training. He graduated in coaching from the Kharkiv State Academy of Physical Culture and in law from the Sumy State University.

== Statistics ==
Event	Date	Venue	Time (seconds)
60 metres	22 February 2008	Sumy, Ukraine	6.65
100 metres	2013	Yalta, Ukraine	10.28
200 metres	July 2014	Kirovograd, Ukraine	20.49
4 × 100 m relay	25 May 2014	Nassau, Bahamas	38.53
