= Vitaliy Korzh =

Ukrainian sprinter

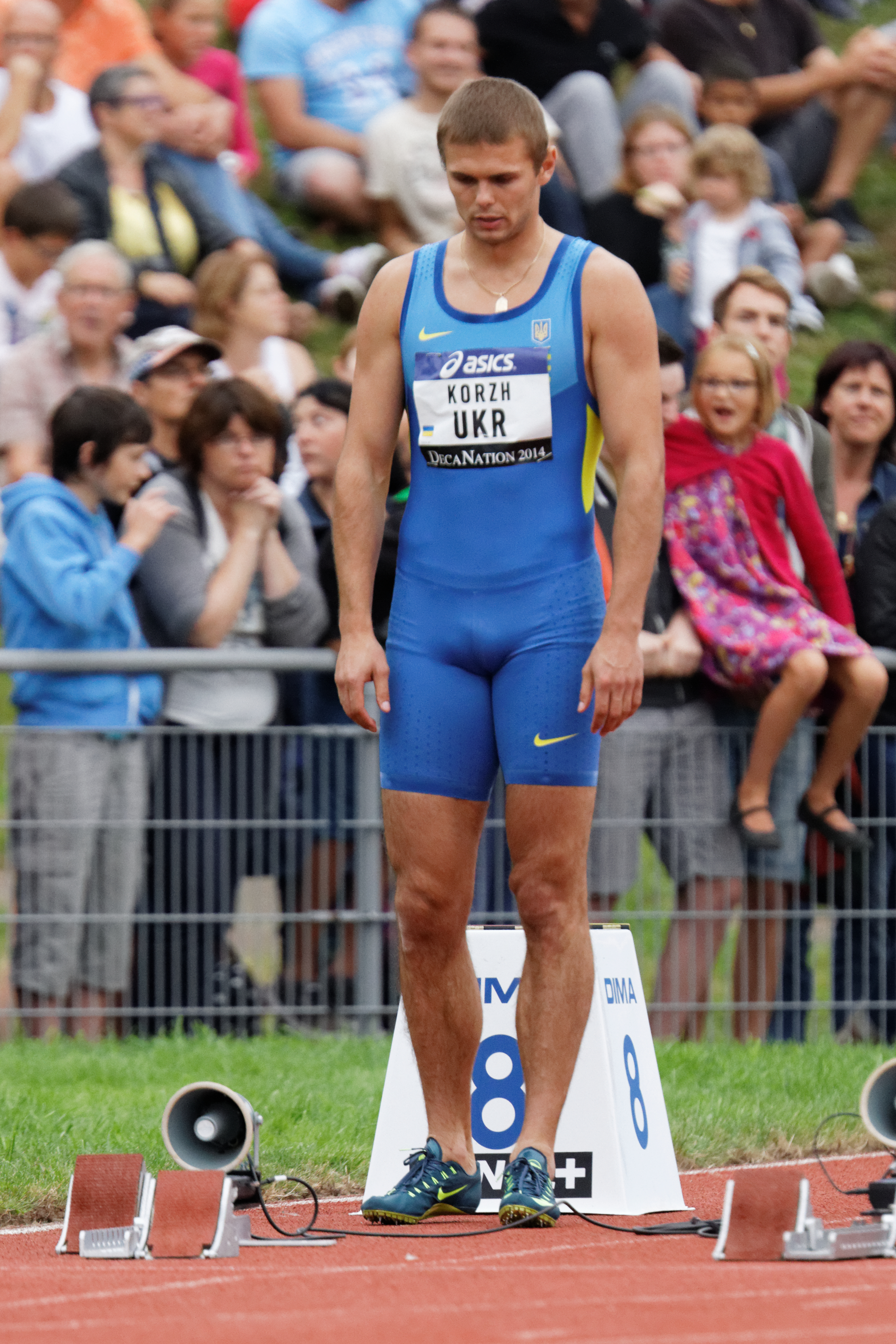
- Vitaliy Korzh in 2014

Personal information
- Born: 5 October 1987 (age 38)

Sport
- Country: Ukraine
- Sport: Track and field
- Event(s): 100 metres 4 × 100 metres relay

Vitaliy Korzh (born 5 October 1987) is a Ukrainian sprinter. He competed in the 4 × 100 metres relay event at the 2015 World Championships in Athletics in Beijing, China.
