= Aleksandr Brednev =

Russian sprinter

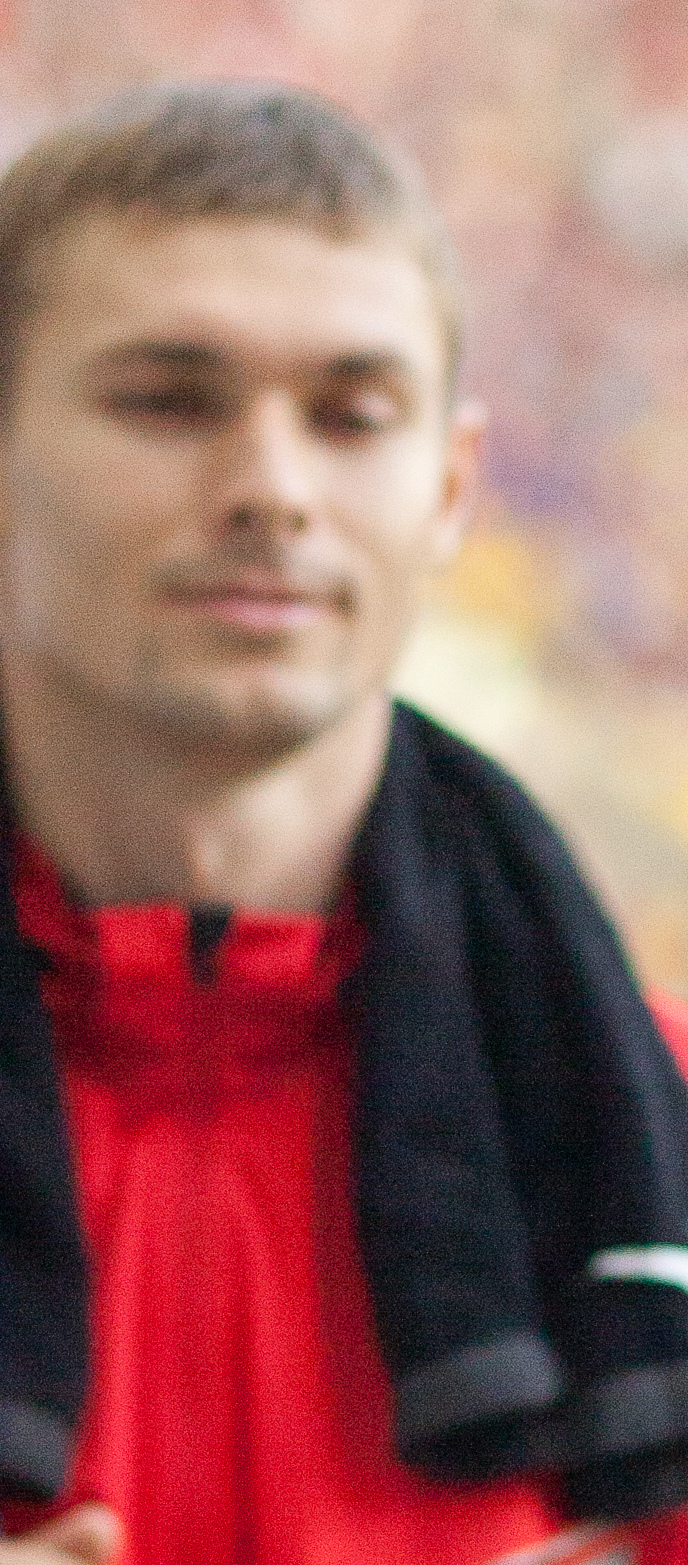
- Aleksandr Brednev in 2013

Personal information
- Nationality: Russian
- Born: 6 June 1988 (age 38)

Sport
- Sport: Track and field
- Event: 100m

Aleksandr Brednev (born 6 June 1988) is a Russian sprinter. He competed in the 100 metres event at the 2013 World Championships in Athletics.
