= 2012 European Athletics Championships – Men's 100 metres =

Men's 100 metres at the 2012 European Athletics Championships
- Venue: Helsinki Olympic Stadium
- Location: Helsinki
- Dates: 27 June (heats); 28 June (semifinals & final)
- Competitors: 35 from 26 nations
- Winning time: 10.09

Medalists
gold medal	Christophe Lemaitre	France
silver medal	Jimmy Vicaut	France
bronze medal	Jaysuma Saidy Ndure	Norway

The men's 100 metres at the 2012 European Athletics Championships was held at the Helsinki Olympic Stadium on 27 and 28 June.

== Records ==
Standing records prior to the 2012 European Athletics Championships
World record	Usain Bolt (JAM)	9.58	Berlin, Germany	16 August 2009
European record	Francis Obikwelu (POR)	9.86	Athens, Greece	22 August 2004
Championship record	Francis Obikwelu (POR)	9.99	Gothenburg, Sweden	8 August 2006
World Leading	Usain Bolt (JAM)	9.76	Rome, Italy	31 May 2012
European Leading	Christophe Lemaitre (FRA)	10.04	Rome, Italy	31 May 2012

== Schedule ==
Date	Time	Round
27 June 2012	11:40	Round 1
27 June 2012	20:15	Semifinals
28 June 2012	19:45	Final

== Results ==
=== Round 1 ===
First 4 in each heat (Q) and 4 best performers (q) advance to the Semifinals.

Wind:

- Heat 1: +1.4 m/s
- Heat 2: +1.0 m/s
- Heat 3: +0.4 m/s
- Heat 4: 0.0 m/s
- Heat 5: +1.7 m/s

Rank	Heat	Lane	Name	Nationality	Time	Note
1	3	5	Christophe Lemaitre	France	10.14	Q
2	1	1	Jimmy Vicaut	France	10.18	Q
3	2	5	Rytis Sakalauskas	Lithuania	10.23	Q
4	5	2	Jaysuma Saidy Ndure	Norway	10.24	Q
5	4	6	Lucas Jakubczyk	Germany	10.26	Q
5	5	1	Dariusz Kuć	Poland	10.26	Q
7	3	4	Harry Aikines-Aryeetey	Great Britain	10.27	Q, SB
8	2	4	Ronalds Arājs	Latvia	10.28	Q, SB
8	5	7	Emmanuel Biron	France	10.28	Q, PB
10	3	1	Julian Reus	Germany	10.31	Q
10	4	3	Simone Collio	Italy	10.31	Q
12	1	7	Serhiy Smelyk	Ukraine	10.32	Q, SB
13	5	3	Stefan Tärnhuvud	Sweden	10.35	Q, PB
14	1	6	Fabio Cerutti	Italy	10.36	Q
15	2	3	Reto Schenkel	Switzerland	10.38	Q
16	1	5	Mark Lewis-Francis	Great Britain	10.39	Q
17	3	7	Jacques Riparelli	Italy	10.42	Q
18	2	2	Jason Smyth	Ireland	10.47	Q
19	4	1	Jan Veleba	Czech Republic	10.48	Q
20	2	6	Arnaldo Abrantes	Portugal	10.49	q, SB
21	1	4	Rolf Fongué	Switzerland	10.53	q
21	5	5	Rostislav Šulc	Czech Republic	10.53	q
23	4	5	Richard Pulst	Estonia	10.57	Q
24	2	1	Ruslan Abbasov	Azerbaijan	10.58	q
25	3	3	Demitri Barski	Israel	10.59	
26	1	3	Matic Osovnikar	Slovenia	10.60	=SB
27	3	6	Catalin Cîmpeanu	Romania	10.65	
28	3	2	Panagiotis Ioannou	Cyprus	10.67	
29	1	2	Eetu Rantala	Finland	10.73	
30	5	6	Rachid Chouhal	Malta	10.86	
31	4	4	Mikel de Sa	Andorra	11.26	
	2	7	İzzet Safer	Turkey	DNF	
	4	2	Georgi Kirilov Georgiev	Bulgaria	DNF	
	4	7	Ángel David Rodríguez	Spain	DNS	
	5	4	Tobias Unger	Germany	DNS	

=== Semifinals ===
First 2 in each heat (Q) and 2 best performers (q) advance to the Semifinals.

Wind:
Heat 1: +1.1 m/s, Heat 2: +0.1 m/s, Heat 3: +0.8 m/s

Rank	Heat	Lane	Name	Nationality	Time	Note
1	1	4	Jaysuma Saidy Ndure	Norway	10.13	Q, SB
2	2	6	Christophe Lemaitre	France	10.14	Q
3	3	3	Jimmy Vicaut	France	10.22	Q
4	1	5	Rytis Sakalauskas	Lithuania	10.23	Q
5	3	5	Serhiy Smelyk	Ukraine	10.28	Q, PB
6	3	4	Ronalds Arājs	Latvia	10.29	q
7	2	3	Harry Aikines-Aryeetey	Great Britain	10.30	Q
7	1	3	Simone Collio	Italy	10.30	q
9	3	6	Lucas Jakubczyk	Germany	10.32	
10	3	8	Jacques Riparelli	Italy	10.33	
11	3	7	Mark Lewis-Francis	Great Britain	10.36	
12	2	4	Dariusz Kuć	Poland	10.38	
13	1	6	Emmanuel Biron	France	10.43	
14	2	5	Julian Reus	Germany	10.44	
15	1	7	Stefan Tärnhuvud	Sweden	10.47	
16	1	1	Arnaldo Abrantes	Portugal	10.47	SB
17	2	8	Reto Schenkel	Switzerland	10.48	
18	1	2	Rolf Fongué	Switzerland	10.50	
18	2	7	Fabio Cerutti	Italy	10.50	
20	2	2	Jason Smyth	Ireland	10.52	
21	3	1	Richard Pulst	Estonia	10.57	
22	1	8	Jan Veleba	Czech Republic	10.60	
22	3	2	Rostislav Šulc	Czech Republic	10.60	
24	2	1	Ruslan Abbasov	Azerbaijan	10.71	

=== Final ===
Wind: -0.7 m/s

Rank	Lane	Name	Nationality	Time	Note
1st place, gold medalist(s)	5	Christophe Lemaitre	France	10.09	
2nd place, silver medalist(s)	6	Jimmy Vicaut	France	10.12	SB
3rd place, bronze medalist(s)	3	Jaysuma Saidy Ndure	Norway	10.17	
4	7	Harry Aikines-Aryeetey	Great Britain	10.31	
5	8	Serhiy Smelyk	Ukraine	10.34	
	2	Ronalds Arājs	Latvia	DNF	
	4	Rytis Sakalauskas	Lithuania	DNF	
	1	Simone Collio	Italy	DQ	FS
