= 2014 European Athletics Championships – Men's 100 metres =

Men's 100 metres at the 2014 European Athletics Championships
- Venue: Letzigrund
- Location: Zürich
- Dates: 12 August (heats); 13 August (semifinals & final)
- Competitors: 37 from 23 nations
- Winning time: 10.06

Medalists
gold medal	James Dasaolu	Great Britain
silver medal	Christophe Lemaitre	France
bronze medal	Harry Aikines-Aryeetey	Great Britain

The men's 100 metres at the 2014 European Athletics Championships took place at the Letzigrund on 12 and 13 August.

The event was won by Great Britain's James Dasaolu, with defending champion Christophe Lemaitre of France in second, and Dasaolu's team-mate Harry Aikines-Aryeetey edging out fellow Briton Dwain Chambers for bronze. Pre-event favourite Jimmy Vicaut of France withdrew at the semi-finals tage with injury, despite running the fastest time in the heats.

== Records ==
Standing records prior to the 2014 European Athletics Championships
World record	Usain Bolt (JAM)	9.58	Berlin, Germany	16 August 2009
European record	Francis Obikwelu (POR)	9.86	Athens, Greece	22 August 2004
Championship record	Francis Obikwelu (POR)	9.99	Gothenburg, Sweden	8 August 2006
World Leading	Justin Gatlin (USA)	9.80	Lausanne, Switzerland	3 July 2014
European Leading	Jimmy Vicaut (FRA)	9.95	Aix-les-Bains, France	18 May 2014

== Schedule ==
Date	Time	Round
12 August 2014	18:28	Round 1
13 August 2014	19:23	Semifinals
13 August 2014	21:49	Final

All times are local times (UTC+2)

== Results ==
=== Round 1 ===
First 4 in each heat (Q) and 4 best performers (q) advance to the Semifinals.

Wind:

- Heat 1: +0.4 m/s
- Heat 2: -0.4 m/s
- Heat 3: -0.1 m/s
- Heat 4: -0.1 m/s
- Heat 5: 0.0 m/s

Rank	Heat	Lane	Name	Nationality	Time	Note
1	4	2	Jimmy Vicaut	France	10.06	Q
2	1	3	Christophe Lemaitre	France	10.16	Q
3	2	4	Dwain Chambers	Great Britain	10.18	Q
4	5	1	Harry Aikines-Aryeetey	Great Britain	10.19	Q
5	3	2	James Dasaolu	Great Britain	10.22	Q
6	2	7	Lucas Jakubczyk	Germany	10.23	Q
7	5	3	Yazaldes Nascimento	Portugal	10.27	Q
8	5	8	Jaysuma Saidy Ndure	Norway	10.30	Q
9	3	7	Churandy Martina	Netherlands	10.31	Q
10	1	6	Mikhail Idrisov	Russia	10.32	Q
11	1	4	Julian Reus	Germany	10.32	Q
12	5	2	Delmas Obou	Italy	10.32	Q, SB
13	2	5	Catalin Cîmpeanu	Romania	10.34	Q, =SB
14	1	8	Eetu Rantala	Finland	10.36	Q
15	3	5	Sven Knipphals	Germany	10.37	Q
16	1	7	Vitaliy Korzh	Ukraine	10.38	q
17=	2	6	Fabio Cerutti	Italy	10.40	Q
17=	1	5	Rytis Sakalauskas	Lithuania	10.40	q, =SB
19=	2	3	Ronalds Arajs	Latvia	10.41	q, SB
19=	3	8	Denis Dimitrov	Bulgaria	10.41	Q
19=	5	7	Jan Veleba	Czech Republic	10.41	q
22	4	7	Pascal Mancini	Switzerland	10.43	Q
23	4	8	Giovanni Codrington	Netherlands	10.43	Q
24=	4	4	Ángel David Rodríguez	Spain	10.44	Q
24=	5	6	Reto Schenkel	Switzerland	10.44	
26	4	5	Robert Kubaczyk	Poland	10.45	
27	1	2	Efthímios Steryioúlis	Greece	10.46	
28	5	5	Kevin Moore	Malta	10.49	NR
29	3	6	Tom Kling-Baptiste	Sweden	10.50	
30	2	8	Odain Rose	Sweden	10.53	
31	3	3	Eduard Viles	Spain	10.57	
32=	4	3	Patrik Andersson	Sweden	10.61	
32=	3	4	Diogo Antunes	Portugal	10.61	
34	5	4	Petar Kremenski	Bulgaria	10.87	
35	2	2	Jorén Tromp	Netherlands	11.28	
36	2	1	Thomas Bollati	Monaco	11.94	
	4	6	Ramil Guliyev	Turkey	DQ	

=== Semifinals ===
First 2 in each heat (Q) and 2 best performers (q) advance to the final.

Wind:

Heat 1: -0.8 m/s, Heat 2: 0.6 m/s, Heat 3: -1.1 m/s

Rank	Heat	Lane	Name	Nationality	Time	Note
1	2	6	James Dasaolu	Great Britain	10.04	Q
2	2	3	Christophe Lemaitre	France	10.10	Q, SB
3	1	6	Harry Aikines-Aryeetey	Great Britain	10.21	Q
4=	3	6	Lucas Jakubczyk	Germany	10.23	Q
4=	2	4	Jaysuma Saidy Ndure	Norway	10.23	q
6	3	5	Dwain Chambers	Great Britain	10.25	Q
7	1	8	Catalin Cîmpeanu	Romania	10.29	Q, SB
8	1	5	Yazaldes Nascimento	Portugal	10.30	q
9	2	5	Churandy Martina	Netherlands	10.34	
10	1	4	Julian Reus	Germany	10.35	
11	1	7	Fabio Cerutti	Italy	10.36	
12	2	8	Sven Knipphals	Germany	10.37	
13=	3	3	Pascal Mancini	Switzerland	10.38	
13=	1	2	Jan Veleba	Czech Republic	10.38	
15	3	2	Vitaliy Korzh	Ukraine	10.39	
16	3	8	Giovanni Codrington	Netherlands	10.39	
17	3	7	Delmas Obou	Italy	10.41	
18	3	4	Mikhail Idrisov	Russia	10.41	
19	3	1	Rytis Sakalauskas	Lithuania	10.44	
20	2	1	Ronalds Arājs	Latvia	10.52	
21	2	7	Eetu Rantala	Finland	10.54	
22	2	2	Ángel David Rodríguez	Spain	10.76	
23	1	1	Denis Dimitrov	Bulgaria	10.98	
	1	3	Jimmy Vicaut	France	DNS	

=== Final ===
Wind: -0.4 m/s

Rank	Lane	Name	Nationality	Time	Note
1st place, gold medalist(s)	3	James Dasaolu	Great Britain	10.06	
2nd place, silver medalist(s)	6	Christophe Lemaitre	France	10.13	
3rd place, bronze medalist(s)	5	Harry Aikines-Aryeetey	Great Britain	10.22	
4	8	Dwain Chambers	Great Britain	10.24	
5	4	Lucas Jakubczyk	Germany	10.25	
6	1	Jaysuma Saidy Ndure	Norway	10.35	
7	7	Catalin Cîmpeanu	Romania	10.44	
8	2	Yazaldes Nascimento	Portugal	10.46	
