= 2011 European Athletics Indoor Championships – Men's 60 metres =

The Men's 60 metres event at the 2011 European Athletics Indoor Championships was held at March 5–6 with the final being held on March 6 at 16:55 local time.

== Records ==
Standing records prior to the 2011 European Athletics Indoor Championships
World record	Maurice Greene (USA)	6.39	Madrid, Spain	3 February 1998
World record	Maurice Greene (USA)	6.39	Atlanta, United States	3 March 2001
European record	Dwain Chambers (GBR)	6.42	Turin, Italy	7 March 2009
Championship record	Dwain Chambers (GBR)	6.42	Turin, Italy	7 March 2009
World Leading	Mike Rodgers (USA)	6.48	Albuquerque, United States	27 February 2011
European Leading	Dwain Chambers (GBR)	6.57	Sheffield, United Kingdom	12 February 2011

== Results ==
=== Heats ===
First 4 in each heat and 4 best performers advanced to the Semifinals.

Rank	Heat	Name	Nationality	React	Time	Notes
1	3	Christophe Lemaitre	France	0.148	6.59	Q
2	1	Pascal Mancini	Switzerland	0.136	6.61	Q, PB
2	2	Francis Obikwelu	Portugal	0.155	6.61	Q, SB
4	3	Cédric Nabe	Switzerland	0.154	6.64	Q, PB
5	3	Arnaldo Abrantes	Portugal	0.149	6.65	Q, =PB
6	2	Martial Mbandjock	France	0.168	6.66	Q, =SB
7	1	Brian Mariano	Netherlands	0.162	6.68	Q
8	3	Ryan Moseley	Austria	0.141	6.69	Q, SB
8	3	Jan Veleba	Czech Republic	0.156	6.69	q
10	1	Rytis Sakalauskas	Lithuania	0.175	6.70	Q, =PB
10	2	Emanuele Di Gregorio	Italy	0.172	6.70	Q
10	4	Ronalds Arājs	Latvia	0.157	6.70	Q
10	4	Joel Fearon	Great Britain	0.164	6.70	Q
10	5	Jonathan Åstrand	Finland	0.156	6.70	Q, PB
10	5	Aliaksandr Linnik	Belarus	0.163	6.70	Q, =PB
16	1	Libor Žilka	Czech Republic	0.141	6.71	Q
16	4	Patrick van Luijk	Netherlands	0.173	6.71	Q
16	5	Dwain Chambers	Great Britain	0.164	6.71	Q
19	1	Michael Tumi	Italy	0.172	6.72	q
19	4	Stefan Tärnhuvud	Sweden	0.167	6.72	Q, =PB
21	2	Iván Mocholí	Spain	0.159	6.74	Q
21	5	Ángel David Rodríguez	Spain	0.160	6.74	Q
23	4	Hannu Hämäläinen	Finland	0.143	6.75	q
23	4	Aleksandr Shpaer	Russia	0.183	6.75	q
25	3	Ruslan Abbasov	Azerbaijan	0.144	6.77	SB
25	5	Aggelos Aggelakis	Greece	0.162	6.77	
27	1	Christian Blum	Germany	0.156	6.80	
27	5	Panayiotis Ioannou	Cyprus	0.161	6.80	
29	2	Dario Horvat	Croatia	0.154	6.81	
30	3	Jarkko Ruostekivi	Finland	0.159	6.82	
31	4	Arman Andreasyan	Armenia	0.167	6.93	NR
32	2	Harry Aikines-Aryeetey	Great Britain	0.162	6.94	
33	2	Ilija Cvijetić	Bosnia and Herzegovina	0.137	6.94	NR
34	1	Federico Gorrieri	San Marino	0.149	7.13	PB
35	1	Andrew Cavilla	Gibraltar	0.258	7.61	
	5	Martin Keller	Germany		DNS	

=== Semifinals ===
First 2 in each heat and 2 best performers advanced to the Final.

Rank	Heat	Name	Nationality	React	Time	Notes
1	2	Christophe Lemaitre	France	0.146	6.55	Q, EL
2	2	Brian Mariano	Netherlands	0.146	6.60	Q, NR
3	1	Dwain Chambers	Great Britain	0.149	6.61	Q
3	1	Martial Mbandjock	France	0.158	6.61	Q, PB
3	3	Francis Obikwelu	Portugal	0.164	6.61	Q, SB
6	2	Emanuele Di Gregorio	Italy	0.159	6.62	q, =SB
6	2	Cédric Nabe	Switzerland	0.155	6.62	q, PB
8	1	Arnaldo Abrantes	Portugal	0.150	6.66	
9	1	Pascal Mancini	Switzerland	0.153	6.67	
10	1	Libor Žilka	Czech Republic	0.146	6.68	
10	1	Aleksandr Shpaer	Russia	0.159	6.68	
10	3	Ryan Moseley	Austria	0.171	6.68	Q, SB
13	3	Joel Fearon	Great Britain	0.178	6.69	
14	3	Patrick van Luijk	Netherlands	0.171	6.70	
15	2	Rytis Sakalauskas	Lithuania	0.180	6.71	
15	2	Hannu Hämäläinen	Finland	0.132	6.71	
15	2	Iván Mocholí	Spain	0.147	6.71	
15	3	Jan Veleba	Czech Republic	0.154	6.71	
15	3	Aliaksandr Linnik	Belarus	0.159	6.71	
15	3	Michael Tumi	Italy	0.172	6.71	=PB
21	2	Stefan Tärnhuvud	Sweden	0.160	6.72	=PB
22	1	Ángel David Rodríguez	Spain	0.143	6.76	
23	1	Jonathan Åstrand	Finland	0.154	6.77	
24	3	Ronalds Arājs	Latvia	0.161	6.78	

=== Final ===
The final was held at 16:55.

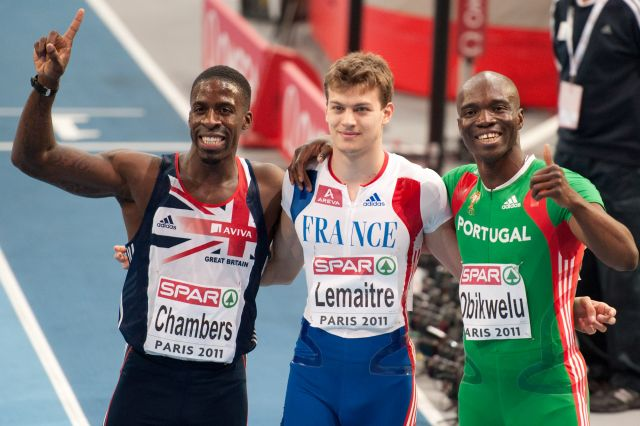
The top three finishers.

Rank	Lane	Name	Nationality	React	Time	Notes
1st place, gold medalist(s)	3	Francis Obikwelu	Portugal	0.155	6.53	NR, EL
2nd place, silver medalist(s)	6	Dwain Chambers	Great Britain	0.142	6.54	SB
3rd place, bronze medalist(s)	4	Christophe Lemaitre	France	0.162	6.58	
4	2	Emanuele Di Gregorio	Italy	0.133	6.59	SB
5	7	Martial Mbandjock	France	0.148	6.61	=PB
6	5	Brian Mariano	Netherlands	0.150	6.64	
7	1	Cédric Nabe	Switzerland	0.162	6.67	
8	8	Ryan Moseley	Austria	0.160	6.68	
