= 2013 European Athletics Indoor Championships – Men's 60 metres =

The men's 60 metres event at the 2013 European Athletics Indoor Championships was held at March 1, 2013 at 17:00 (round 1), March 2, 17:15 (semi-final) and 18:40 (final) local time.

== Records ==
Standing records prior to the 2013 European Athletics Indoor Championships
World record	Maurice Greene (USA)	6.39	Madrid, Spain	3 February 1998
World record	Maurice Greene (USA)	6.39	Atlanta, United States	3 March 2001
European record	Dwain Chambers (GBR)	6.42	Turin, Italy	7 March 2009
Championship record	Dwain Chambers (GBR)	6.42	Turin, Italy	7 March 2009
World Leading	Darvis Patton (USA)	6.50	New York City, United States	16 February 2013
European Leading	Michael Tumi (ITA)	6.51	Ancona, Italy	17 February 2013

== Results ==
=== Round 1 ===
Qualification: First 4 (Q) and the 4 fastest athletes (q) advanced to the semifinals.

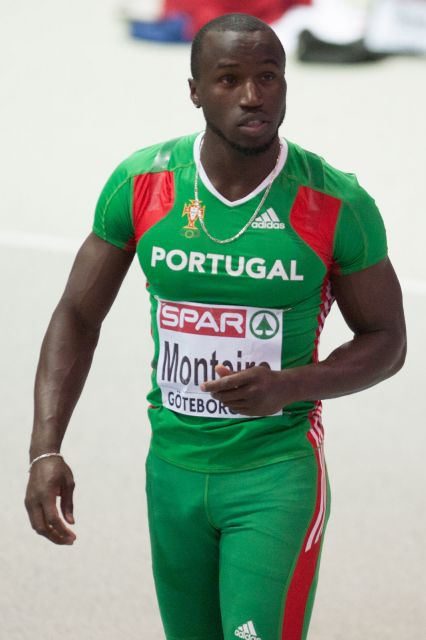
Ricardo Monteiro of Portugal.

Rank	Heat	Athlete	Nationality	Time	Note
1	2	Jimmy Vicaut	France	6.55	Q
2	3	Michael Tumi	Italy	6.59	Q
3	3	James Dasaolu	Great Britain	6.62	Q
4	1	Catalin Cîmpeanu	Romania	6.64	Q
5	1	Julian Reus	Germany	6.64	Q
6	1	Harry Aikines-Aryeetey	Great Britain	6.65	Q, SB
6	2	Jaysuma Saidy Ndure	Norway	6.65	Q
8	3	Aleksandr Brednev	Russia	6.68	Q
8	1	Emmanuel Biron	France	6.72	Q
8	2	Simone Collio	Italy	6.72	Q
11	3	Stefan Tärnhuvud	Sweden	6.73	Q, SB
11	1	Rolf Fongué	Switzerland	6.73	q
13	2	Odain Rose	Sweden	6.74	Q
13	1	Tom Kling-Baptiste	Sweden	6.74	q, SB
13	3	Ricardo Monteiro	Portugal	6.74	q
16	3	Adam Zavacký	Slovakia	6.76	q
17	2	Dwain Chambers	Great Britain	6.78	
18	2	Visa Hongisto	Finland	6.79	
19	1	Diogo Antunes	Portugal	6.81	
20	2	Riste Pandev	Macedonia	6.95	
21	1	Mikel de Sa	Andorra	7.36	
22	2	Dominic Carroll	Gibraltar	7.44	

=== Semifinals ===
Qualification: First 4 (Q) advanced to the final.

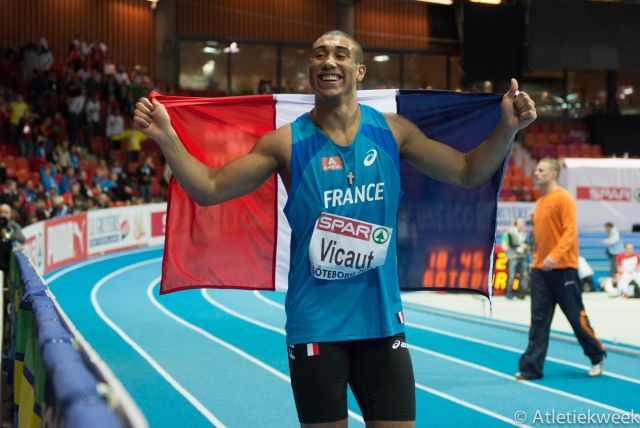
Jimmy Vicaut won the gold for France.

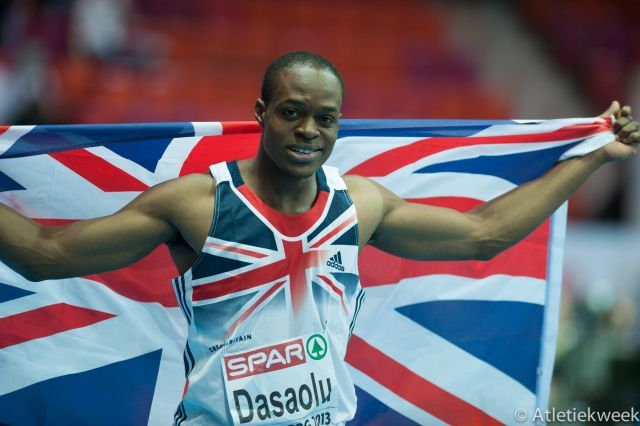
James Dasaolu of Great Britain finished second in the final.

Rank	Heat	Athlete	Nationality	Time	Note
1	2	James Dasaolu	Great Britain	6.52	Q, PB
2	1	Michael Tumi	Italy	6.58	Q
3	1	Jaysuma Saidy Ndure	Norway	6.59	Q, SB
4	2	Jimmy Vicaut	France	6.60	Q
5	2	Odain Rose	Sweden	6.63	Q, PB
6	1	Harry Aikines-Aryeetey	Great Britain	6.64	Q, SB
7	1	Emmanuel Biron	France	6.65	Q
8	1	Catalin Cîmpeanu	Romania	6.66	
8	2	Julian Reus	Germany	6.66	Q
10	1	Stefan Tärnhuvud	Sweden	6.67	PB
11	1	Tom Kling-Baptiste	Sweden	6.73	SB
12	2	Rolf Fongué	Switzerland	6.75	
13	2	Adam Zavacký	Slovakia	6.75	
14	2	Aleksandr Brednev	Russia	6.75	
15	1	Ricardo Monteiro	Portugal	6.76	
16	2	Simone Collio	Italy	6.89	

=== Final ===
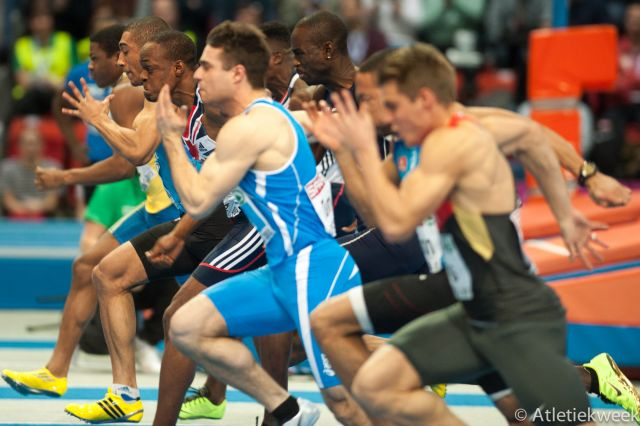
The 60 metres final in progress.

The final was held at 18:40.

Rank	Lane	Athlete	Nationality	Time	Note
1st place, gold medalist(s)	6	Jimmy Vicaut	France	6.48	WL, PB
2nd place, silver medalist(s)	5	James Dasaolu	Great Britain	6.48	=WL, PB
3rd place, bronze medalist(s)	3	Michael Tumi	Italy	6.52	
4	4	Jaysuma Saidy Ndure	Norway	6.61	
5	8	Odain Rose	Sweden	6.62	PB
6	1	Julian Reus	Germany	6.62	
7	7	Harry Aikines-Aryeetey	Great Britain	6.63	SB
8	2	Emmanuel Biron	France	6.63	=SB
