= James Dasaolu =

British sprint track and field athlete

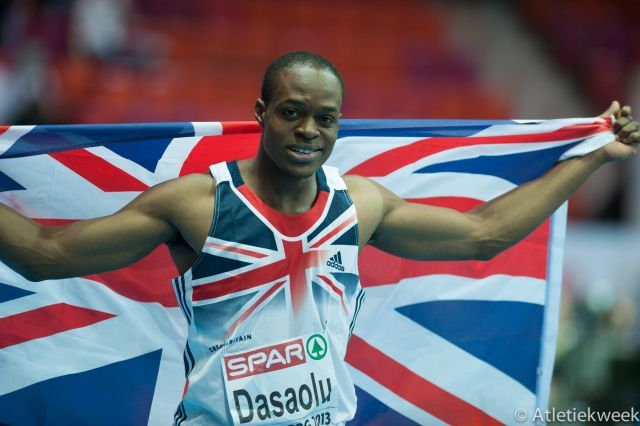
- Dasaolu after his silver medal at 2013 European Athletics Indoor Championships

Personal information
- Nationality: British (English)
- Born: 5 September 1987 (age 38) London, England
- Height: 187 cm (6 ft 2 in)
- Weight: 88 kg (194 lb)

Sport
- Sport: Athletics
- Events: 100 metres 4 × 100 m relay
- Club: Croydon Harriers
- Coached by: Steve Fudge

Achievements and titles
- Personal bests: 100 m: 9.91 (Birmingham 2013); 60 m: 6.47 (Birmingham 2014)
Medal record
Representing Great Britain
European Championships
| Gold medal – first place | 2014 Zurich | 100 m |
| Gold medal – first place | 2016 Amsterdam | 4 × 100 m |
European Indoor Championships
| Silver medal – second place | 2013 Gothenburg | 60 m |
Representing Europe
Continental Cup
| Gold medal – first place | 2014 Marrakesh | 100 m |

Oyeyemi Olugbenga Olatokunbo James Dasaolu (born 5 September 1987) is a British retired track and field athlete who specialised in the 100 metres. In July 2013, he became the second fastest Briton of all time after running a 100 m time of 9.91 seconds in the British Championships. In 2014 he won his first major title, claiming the gold medal in the 100 metres at the 2014 European Athletics Championships.

== Biography ==
Born in south London to Nigerian parents, Dasaolu did not take up sprinting seriously until he was 17.

=== Early career ===
He began his career in competitive athletics relatively late, first competing in 2006; as a result he had a limited youth and junior career. However, having begun, Croydon Harrier Dasaolu made steady and significant improvements in his first few years; his 100 m personal best in 2006 was 10.75 seconds, then 10.33 seconds in 2007, and 10.26 seconds in 2008.

=== 2008 ===
The 2008 season saw Dasaolu rise up the national rankings and introduced to the UK Athletics warm weather training camp. Under the tutelage of coach Michael Khmel at Loughborough University and training with 2006 World Junior Champion Harry Aikines-Aryeetey and former European Junior Champion Leon Baptiste, Dasaolu won the 2008 England under-23 championships and reached the semi-finals at the British Olympic Trials.

=== 2009 ===
The beginning of the 2009 season showed further improvement for Dasaolu. At the seventh Graziano Della Valle meet in Italy, he recorded a new personal best of 10.15 seconds and finished in second place overall behind Aikines-Aryeetey. Two weeks later he finished with 10.25 seconds at the Papaflessia meet in Greece, second only to European season leader Dwain Chambers. A 100 m win at the European Athletics permit meet in Geneva in June placed him among the top European sprinters for the first time. His new personal best time of 10.09 seconds made him joint second, with Simeon Williamson, in the season's 100 m European rankings and improved his chances for a place on the British relay team at the Berlin World Championships.

=== 2010 ===
The 2010 season saw Dasaolu make his senior GB debut when he represented GB at the European Championships in Barcelona after finishing second only to Dwain Chambers in the UK trials with a time of 10.23. However he disappointed at the Championships where he stumbled through his heat with a time of 10.40 and then crashed out in the semi-finals with at time of 10.31.

=== 2012 ===
Dasaolu was selected by UK Athletics for the 100 metres at the 2012 Olympics. He set a season's best time of 10.13 in his heat, finishing third behind winner Usain Bolt to qualify for the semi-finals. He finished seventh in his semi-final with a time of 10.18.

=== 2013 ===
He began 2013 by winning a silver medal at the 2013 European Athletics Indoor Championships in the 60 metres, running a personal best of 6.48 seconds in the final, finishing centimetres behind champion Jimmy Vicaut. On 13 July at the British trials, Dasaolu ran a personal best of 9.91, the second fastest time ever by a Briton behind Linford Christie. He was selected as a member of the British squad for the 2013 World Championships in Athletics for the 100 metres and 4 × 100 metres relay. In the 100 metres Dasaolu advanced from the heats as a fastest loser before setting a time of 9.97 in the semi-final to qualify for a world-level final for the first time, where he finished in eighth with a time of 10.21.

=== 2014 ===
2014 started brightly for Dasaolu as he opened with a 6.50 in the 60 m at the annual Glasgow International match to start his indoor campaign. A time only 0.02 shy of his personal best achieved in the previous year at the European Indoor Championships in Gothenburg. He would later run 6.47 at the Sainsbury's Indoor Grand Prix, improving his personal best by one hundredth of a second. In the final of the Grand Prix, Dasaolu won with a time of 6.50 but pulled up 20 m from the line after a slight tear in his thigh muscle, causing him to give up his automatic selection place for the World Indoor Championships and focus on the outdoor season instead. Dasaolu won his first major senior gold in the final of the 100 m at the 2014 European Athletics Championships with a time of 10.06 seconds, beating out two-time defending champion Christophe Lemaitre.

=== 2018 ===
In November 2018 Dasaolu suffered an injury, rupturing his Achilles tendon. After raising money on his go fund me page. Dasaolu raised over £10000 for his surgery and recovery. He eventually retired from the sport in 2022.

== Personal bests ==
| Event | Best | Location | Date |
|---|---|---|---|
| 60 metres | 6.47 s | Birmingham, United Kingdom | 15 February 2014 |
| 100 metres | 9.91 s | Birmingham, United Kingdom | 13 July 2013 |

- All information taken from IAAF profile.

== See also ==
- Great Britain at the Olympics
