= Stefan Tärnhuvud =

Swedish sprinter

Personal information
- Born: 16 January 1985 (age 40) Ärentuna, Sweden

Sport
- Sport: Athletics
- Event: 100 metres
- Club: Sundsvalls FI
- Coached by: Håkan Andersson

Stefan Hjalmar Tärnhuvud (born 16 January 1985) is a Swedish sprinter. He represented his country at three outdoor and two indoor European Championships.

== International competitions ==
Year	Competition	Venue	Position	Event	Notes
Representing Sweden
2004	World Junior Championships	Grosseto, Italy	–	4 × 100 m relay	DNF
2006	European Championships	Gothenburg, Sweden	12th (h)	4 × 100 m relay	40.14
2011	European Indoor Championships	Paris, France	21st (sf)	60 m	6.72
2012	European Championships	Helsinki, Finland	15th (sf)	100 m	10.47
2012	European Championships	Helsinki, Finland	11th (h)	4 × 100 m relay	39.87
2013	European Indoor Championships	Gothenburg, Sweden	10th (sf)	60 m	6.67
2014	European Championships	Zürich, Switzerland	10th (h)	4 × 100 m relay	39.27
2018	European Championships	Berlin, Germany	–	4 × 100 m relay	DNF

== Personal bests ==
Outdoor

- 100 metres – 10.35 (+1.7 m/s, Helsinki 2012)
- 200 metres – 21.30 (+0.4 m/s, Helsinki 2008)

Indoor

- 60 metres – 6.67 (Gotheburg 2013)
- 200 metres – 22.13 (Malmö 2008)
