= Christophe Lemaitre =

French sprinter (born 1990)

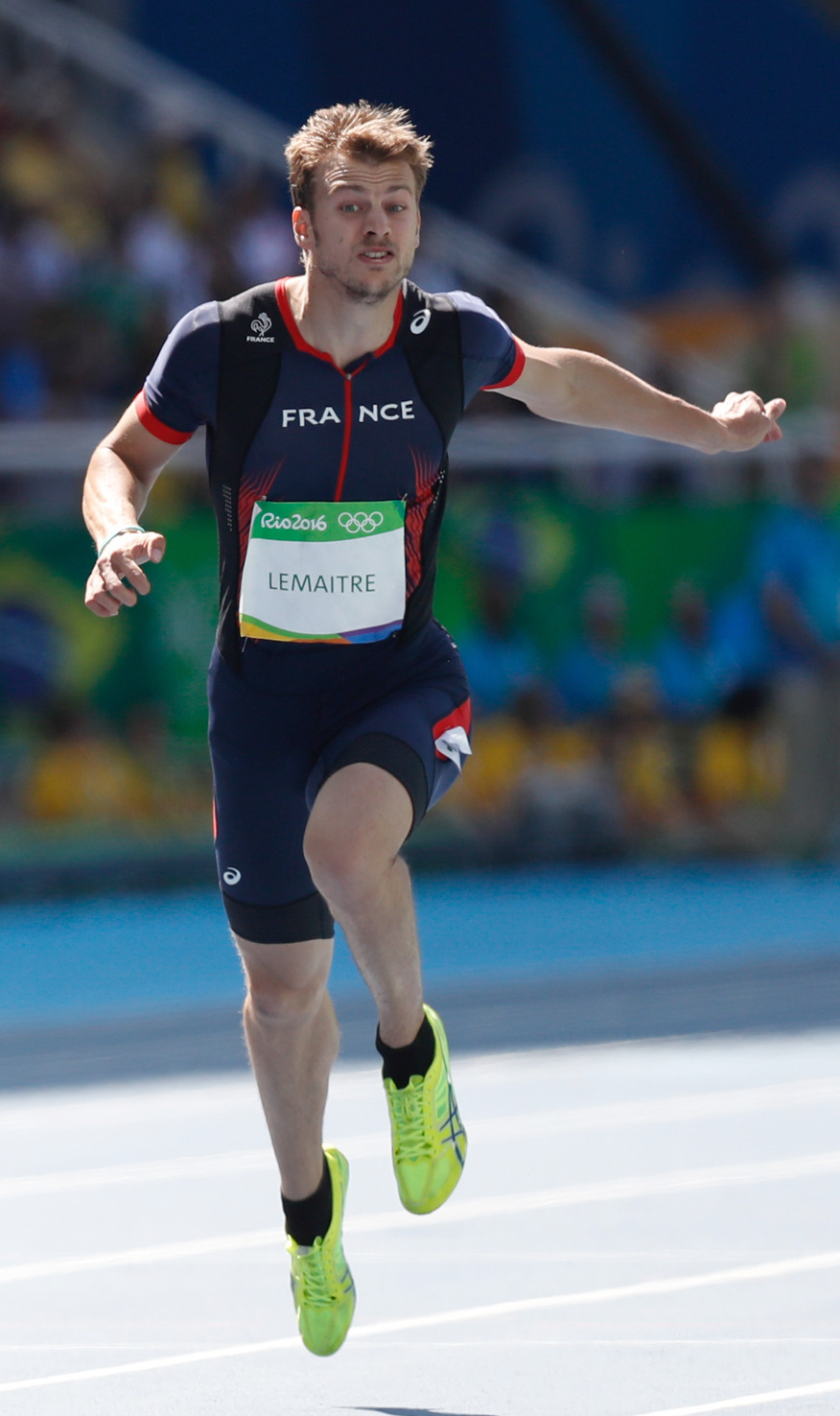
- Lemaitre during the Rio 2016 Olympic Games

Personal information
- Full name: Christophe Alexandre Christian Lemaitre
- Born: 11 June 1990 (age 36) Annecy, France
- Home town: Aix-les-Bains
- Height: 1.90 m (6 ft 3 in)
- Weight: 82 kg (181 lb)

Sport
- Country: France
- Sport: Athletics
- Events: 100 metres, 200 m
- Club: Athlétique Sport Aixois

Achievements and titles
- Personal bests: 100 m: 9.92 (Albi 2011); 200 m: 19.80 NR (Daegu 2011)
Medal record
Men's athletics
Representing France
Olympic Games
Bronze medal – third place	2012 London	4 × 100 m relay
Bronze medal – third place	2016 Rio de Janeiro	200 m
World Championships
Silver medal – second place	2011 Daegu	4 × 100 m relay
Bronze medal – third place	2011 Daegu	200 m
European Championships
Gold medal – first place	2010 Barcelona	100 m
Gold medal – first place	2010 Barcelona	200 m
Gold medal – first place	2010 Barcelona	4 × 100 m relay
Gold medal – first place	2012 Helsinki	100 m
Silver medal – second place	2014 Zurich	100 m
Silver medal – second place	2014 Zurich	200 m
Bronze medal – third place	2012 Helsinki	4 × 100 m relay
Bronze medal – third place	2014 Zurich	4 × 100 m relay
European Indoor Championships
Bronze medal – third place	2011 Paris	60 m
World Junior Championships
Gold medal – first place	2008 Bydgoszcz	200 m
European Junior Championships
Gold medal – first place	2009 Novi Sad	100 m
Representing Europe
Continental Cup
Gold medal – first place	2010 Split	100 m
Silver medal – second place	2014 Marrakesh	4 × 100 m relay

Christophe Alexandre Christian Lemaitre (French pronunciation: [kʁistɔf ləmɛtʁ]; born 11 June 1990) is a French former sprinter who specialised in the 100 and 200 metres. In 2010, Lemaitre became the first white athlete to break the 10-second barrier in an officially timed 100 m event. Lemaitre ran a sub-10 second 100 m on seven occasions: three times in 2010 and four times in 2011. He won a bronze medal in the 4 × 100 m relay at the 2012 London Olympic Games and in the 200 metres at the Rio 2016 Summer Olympics.

At the age of 20, Lemaitre won the 100 m, 200 m and the 4 × 100 m relay titles at the 2010 European Championships, the first French sprinter ever to achieve that triple. He was the fastest European 100 m and 200 m sprinter in 2010. He won a bronze medal in the 200 m at the 2011 World Championships. As of August 2013, Lemaitre was one of the three Frenchmen (the other two are Ronald Pognon and Jimmy Vicaut) to have broken the 10-second barrier in the 100 metres outdoor.

Due to injury and a negative reaction to his COVID-19 vaccination, Lemaitre did not compete in the 2020 Olympics in Tokyo.

== Career ==
=== Growing up ===
Lemaitre grew up in the town of Annecy, where he took part in handball, rugby and football, before his sprinting prowess was discovered. In 2005 at the age of 15, during national sprinting events, Lemaitre ended up with the fastest 50 metres in the country. A month after his 16th birthday in 2006, and less than a year after joining an athletics club in Aix-les-Bains, Lemaitre ran 100 m in 10.96 seconds. His personal best improved to 10.53 seconds in 2007.

=== 2008–2009 ===
In 2008, he ran a new 100 m personal best of 10.26 seconds. At the 2008 World Junior Championships in Athletics, Lemaitre won the 200 m title with a time of 20.83 seconds.

At the 2009 European Athletics Junior Championships, Lemaitre won gold in the 100 m and set a new European junior record with a time of 10.04 seconds. He won the 2009 men's European Athletics Rising Star of the Year Award for his achievements in 2009.

=== 2010: European champion in 100 m, 200 m, and 4 × 100 m ===
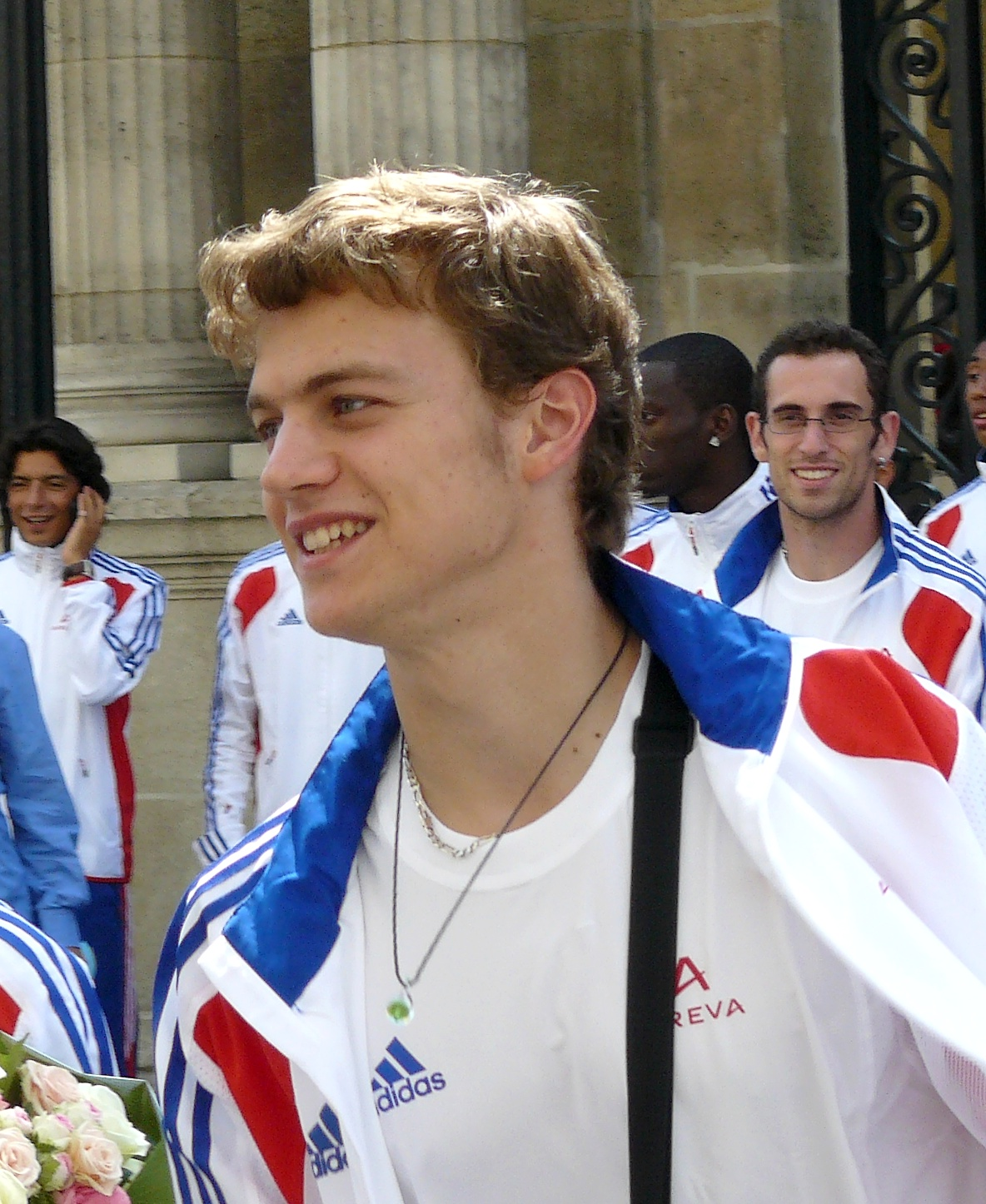
Lemaitre after winning his medals in Barcelona.

At the start of the 2010 outdoor season, he opened with a run of 10.09 seconds in Aix-les-Bains before winning in 10.24 into a headwind of −2.2 m/s in Vénissieux. He ran at the French National Interclub Championships in Franconville in May 2010 and recorded a new 100 m personal best of 10.03 seconds, although he said he was disappointed to have missed Ronald Pognon's French record of 9.99 seconds. He aimed once more at the record at the 2010 European Team Championships and, although he again missed his target, he finished as runner-up against Dwain Chambers with a personal best of 10.02 seconds.

On 9 July 2010, Lemaitre officially became the first man purely of European descent to run 100 metres in under 10 seconds, with a time of 9.98 s at the 2010 French National Championships in the city of Valence. By doing so, Lemaitre also broke the 100 m French national record of 9.99 s set by Ronald Pognon on 5 July 2005 in Lausanne. Afterwards Lemaitre said, "Of course, it was my goal to break it (the 10-second barrier). One has to run under 10 seconds in order to be part of the world's best. I will be recognised as the first white man to do so, but today's achievement is mainly about making history for myself!...It is not about the color (of one's skin), it is about hard work." One day later (at the same 2010 French National Championships), Lemaitre equalled the 200 m French national outdoor record with a time of 20.16 seconds. Gilles Quénéhervé had held the 200 m French national outdoor record exclusively for almost 23 years - since 3 September 1987.

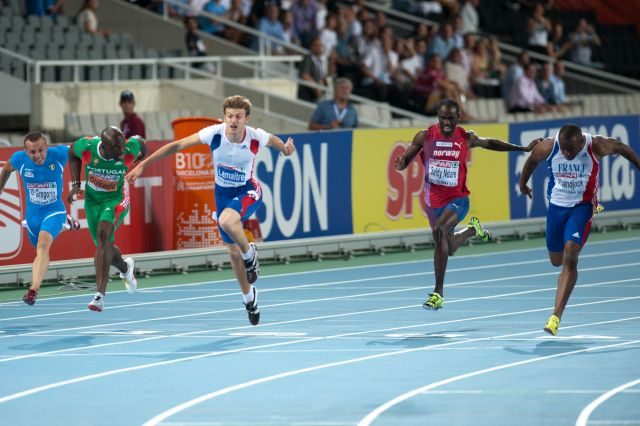
100 m final at the 2010 European Athletics Championships in Barcelona.

At the 2010 European Championships, he won the gold medal in the 100 m with a time of 10.11 s. The next day, after comfortably progressing through the heats and semi-finals of the 200 m, Lemaitre became the double European champion by storming to victory in the 200 m final in a time of 20.37 s, beating Great Britain's Christian Malcolm by 0.01 s (Malcolm clocked his season's best time of 20.38 s in the final). Lemaitre then combined with Jimmy Vicaut, Pierre-Alexis Pessonneaux, and Martial Mbandjock in the 4 × 100 m relay final to finish first ahead of Italy and Germany in a time of 38.11 s. At the IAAF World Challenge's Rieti Meeting in Rieti, Italy on 29 August 2010, Lemaitre competed in the 100 m. In that event, he equalled his personal best in his heat with a time of 9.98 s, and improved on it in the final with a time of 9.97 s (reaction time 0.199 s).

=== 2011: World Championships 200 m bronze and 4 × 100 m silver ===
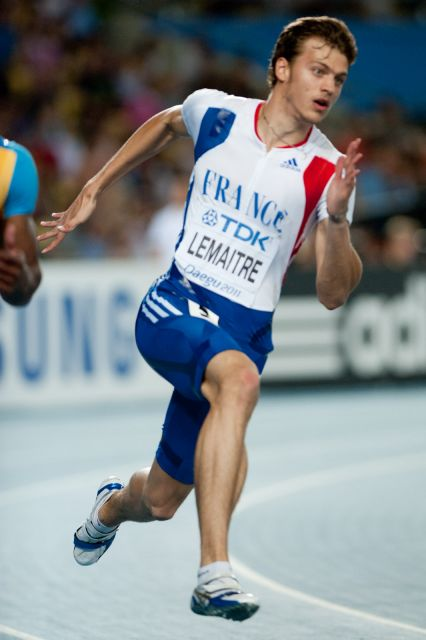
Lemaitre at the 2011 World Championships in Athletics in Daegu.

During the 2011 European Indoor Championships in Paris, Christophe Lemaitre was the fastest during the heats of the 60 m event. He also had the fastest time in the semi-finals, but he only finished in third place in the final.

On 7 June, at the first meeting of the Pro Athlé Tour in Montreuil, he broke his own national record with a time of 9.96 s. On 18 June, he went on to again lower his national record, clocking a time of 9.95 s at the 2011 European Team Championships in Stockholm, Sweden. On 30 June, he matched his national record with a time of 9.95 s in Lausanne. On 29 July, he again lowered the French national record at the French National Championships in Albi, with a time of 9.92 s. By winning that race in 9.92 s, he became the third fastest sprinter of non-west African descent (after Frankie Fredericks and 0.01 s ahead of Patrick Johnson).

On 30 July, he appeared to break the 200 metres French national record, but it did not count as the wind speed was 2.3 m/s, which was 0.3 m/s over the limit. At the 2011 World Championships in Daegu, Lemaitre reached the final of the 100 m event, where he finished fourth. On 3 September, he won the bronze medal in the 200 m event, with a time of 19.80 s and a wind speed of 0.8 m/s in the final. In doing so, he pulverized the previous French national record (20.16 s) that he had shared with Gilles Quénéhervé for 14 months by 0.36 seconds. In that race he became the second-fastest European 200 m sprinter in history after Pietro Mennea and also the first white man to break 10 seconds for 100 metres and 20 seconds for 200 metres. On 4 September, Lemaitre teamed up with Jimmy Vicaut, Teddy Tinmar and Yannick Lesourd to run a season best of 38.20 s in the 4 × 100 metres relay final, finishing second behind the world record-breaking Jamaican team and thus taking the silver medal.

=== 2012: Olympic 4 × 100 m bronze in London ===
Lemaitre, after consulting with his coach, opted out of competing in the 100 m in the 2012 London Olympics. Lemaitre would thus only participate in the 200 m, in which he was ranked fourth that year, and the 4 × 100 m relay. His coach, Pierre Carraz, said: "In the results over 100m, Christophe is only ranked 10th among those who have entered. Over 200m, we can hope for a medal." Lemaitre finished sixth in the 200 m final in a time of 20.19 s. After the final, he said, "I started very well. And then I still had this problem at the bend. I did my best, but it was too difficult. I finished sixth. There is not much to say. For me, it was not the final I was hoping for." In the 4 × 100 m relay final, Lemaitre won his first Olympic medal, with his team taking the bronze behind Jamaica (gold) and Trinidad and Tobago (silver).

=== 2013 ===
In the 100 m final at the 2013 World Championships in Moscow, Lemaitre finished in seventh place in a time of 10.06. On 12 August, one day after the 100 m final, he withdrew from the 200 m and the 4 × 100 m relay due to an injury near the right knee sustained during the 100 m final.

=== 2014 ===
At the 2014 European Championships, he won three medals, with silvers in the 100 m and 200 m behind the British sprinters James Dasaolu and Adam Gemili respectively, before winning bronze in the 4 × 100 m relay. He has now won a record eight medals at the European Championships.

=== 2016: Olympic 200 m bronze in Rio de Janeiro ===
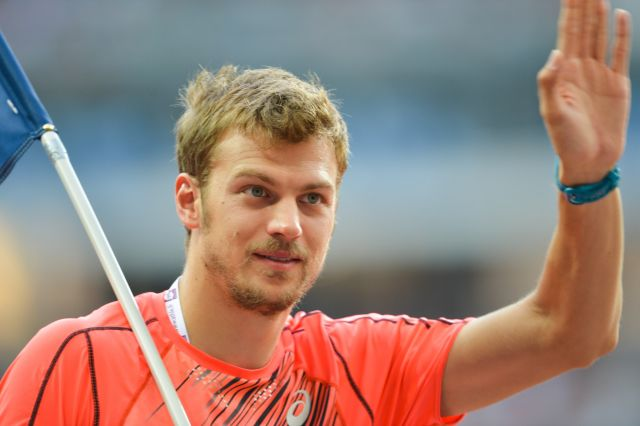
Christophe Lemaitre at the Meeting de Paris several days after having won the 200 m bronze medal at the Olympics in Rio.

After a disappointing 2015 season in which he failed to reach the World Championships final in Beijing in either the 100 m or the 200 m, Lemaitre started to think about changing his coach. After months of reflection, he decided to stay and train in his hometown of Aix-les-Bains. On 27 February, Lemaitre captured the indoor 200 m French national title with a personal best time of 20.43. Afterwards, he stated his desire to run a sub-20 second 200 m again, a time he had not achieved since 2012. However, an injury in June forced him to withdraw from the European Championships in Amsterdam in order to prepare for the Olympic Games.

At the Olympics, Lemaitre didn't reach the 100 m final after finishing third in his semi-final in 10.07, although it was his season's best. However, in the 200 m, he qualified for the final after clocking 20.01 in the semi-final behind America's LaShawn Merritt. In the 200 metres final, Lemaitre won the bronze medal in a 20.12 clocking, just 3 milliseconds ahead of Great Britain's Adam Gemili, with the podium spot determined in a photo finish. In the process, Lemaitre became the first French athlete to win a medal in the event since Abdoulaye Seye in 1960.

=== 2017 ===
Lemaitre in the 200 metres event competed at the 2017 IAAF World Championships in Athletics. There, he finished third in his heat with a time of 20.40, behind Ameer Webb, and Ramil Guliyev, who would win the final 3 days later. 2 days later, Lemaitre failed to advance to the final, finishing 4th in his semi, but clocking 20.30. His time however, was the 8th fastest, but Japanese sprinter Abdul Hakim Sani Brown qualified automatically with 20.43.

=== 2018 ===
During the indoor season Lemaitre came within 0.02 of his personal best with a 6.57 in the 60 m heats at a meeting in Mondeville and finished ahead of Jimmy Vicaut in the final, but during the outdoor season injured his right hamstring during the 100 m Diamond League race at the Meeting de Paris. This ruled him out of the 2018 European Athletics Championships later that year.

=== 2019 ===
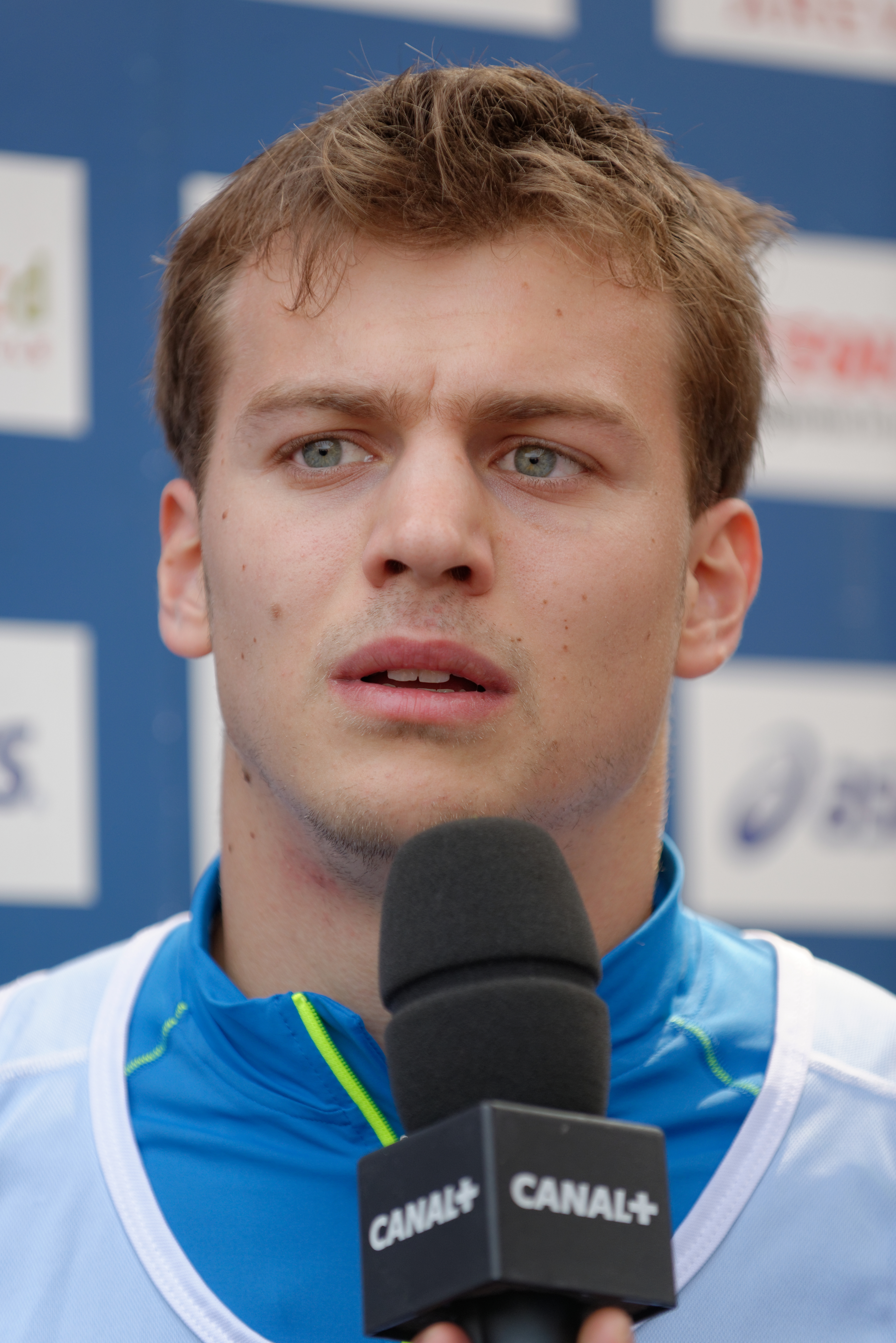
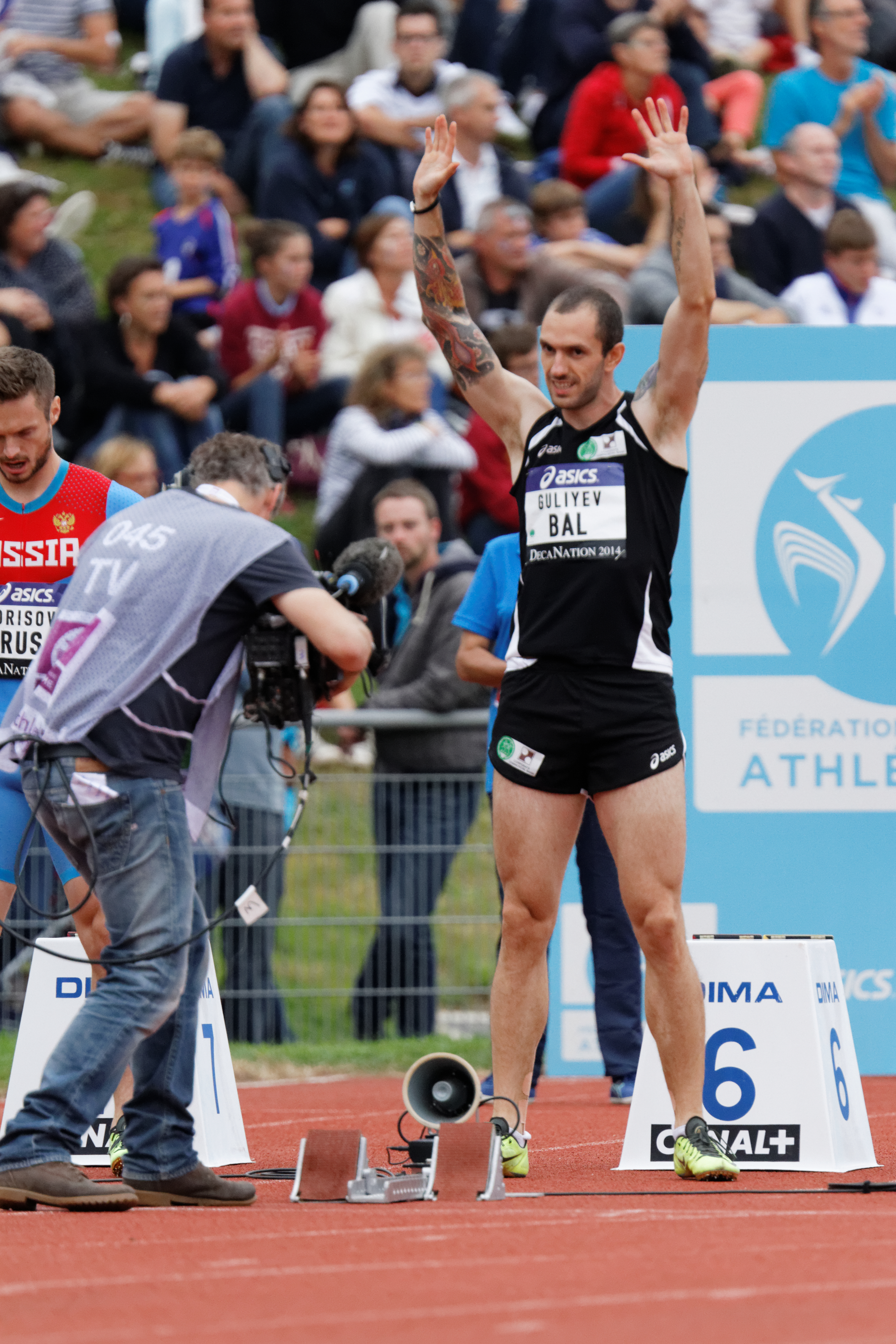
Christophe Lemaitre (left) and Ramil Guliyev (right) were the first and second white athletes to break the 10-second barrier in 2010 and 2017 respectively.

Lemaitre was selected by the French Athletics Federation for the 200 m and 4 × 100 m relay at the 2019 World Athletics Championships. After some disappointing results at 200 m leading up to the competition, Lemaitre gave up the 200 m and decided to focus only on the relay at the World Championships. Lemaitre was assigned to run the anchor leg for France in the 4 × 100 m final in Doha, but the French team failed to pass the baton on the first exchange and did not finish the race.

=== 2021 ===
Lemaitre struggled with injuries in the buildup to the 2020 Summer Olympics and his preparation was further hampered by a bad reaction following a COVID-19 vaccination. As a result, he withdrew from the French Athletics Championships, and was not selected to represent France at the Olympics.

=== 2024 ===
Lemaitre announced his retirement in June 2024 after failing to qualify for the 2024 Olympics in Paris .

=== Recognition ===
Christophe Lemaitre was the winner of the 2010 men's European Athlete of the Year Trophy. He was also named the 2010 L'Équipe Champion of Champions (France category) (ahead of Sébastien Loeb and Teddy Riner) by the French sports daily L'Équipe and the 2010 RTL Champion of Champions by the French commercial radio network RTL.

After Lemaitre had first broken the ten seconds barrier in the 100 m in 2010, L'Équipe put him on the front page, even though the Tour de France was taking place. During his European Championships treble gold medal-winning year of 2010, Lemaitre ran faster than the former world record-holder Asafa Powell and the former double world champion Tyson Gay did at his age.

Lemaitre took second place in the total points received that decided who was to win the 2011 men's European Athlete of the Year Trophy.

=== Personal life ===
In addition to his career in athletics, Lemaitre attends the University of Savoy, where he is studying for a professional bachelor's degree in industrial electrical engineering and computer science.

== Personal bests ==
Event	Time	Wind	Venue	Date	Ref.
60 metres indoor	6.55		(France) Aubière	13 February 2010	
100 metres	9.92	+2.0 m/s	(France) Albi	29 July 2011	
200 metres	19.80 NR	+0.8 m/s	(South Korea) Daegu	3 September 2011	
200 metres indoor	20.43		(France) Aubière	28 February 2016	

Key: NR = National record

Awards and achievements
Preceded by Sébastien Loeb; Daniel Elena	French Sportsperson of the Year; 2010	Succeeded by Nikola Karabatić
