= Brian Mariano =

Curaçaoan sprinter

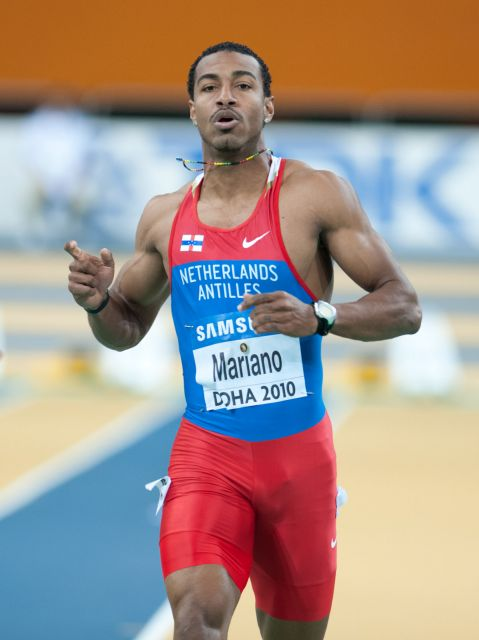
- Mariano in Doha, 2010

Personal information
- Nationality: Netherlands
- Born: 22 January 1985 (age 41) Willemstad
- Height: 1.78 m (5 ft 10 in) (2010)
- Weight: 70 kg (154 lb) (2010)

Sport
- Sport: Sprint
- Event(s): 60 metres, 100 metres, 200 metres
Medal record
Representing Netherlands Antilles
Men's athletics
Central American and Caribbean Games
Bronze medal – third place	2010 Mayaguez	4 × 100 m relay
Representing Netherlands
Men's athletics
European Athletics Championships
Gold medal – first place	2012 Helsinki	4 × 100 m relay

Brian Mariano (born 22 January 1985) is a Curaçaoan sprinter who specializes in the 100 and 200 metres and starts for the Netherlands, formerly for Netherlands Antilles until October 1, 2010. He finished fourth-fastest in the men's 60 metres heats at the 2010 IAAF World Indoor Championships in Doha, but was disqualified in the semifinals. He won a bronze medal in the 4 × 100 metres relay at the 2010 Central American and Caribbean Games in Mayaguez alongside Prince Kwidama, Curtis Cock and Churandy Martina.

Mariano finished sixth in the 60 metres at the 2011 European Athletics Indoor Championships in Paris, representing the Netherlands for the first time.

Mariano ran his personal best over 100 m and 200 m at the UTEP Invitational on 10 April 2010.

After a race on 6 February 2016 he tested positive in a doping test.

== Personal best ==
Distance	Time	venue
60 m	6.60 s (indoor)	Ghent, Belgium (14 February 2010) Paris, France (5 March 2011)
100 m	10.23 s	El Paso, Texas, United States (10 April 2010)
200 m	20.81 s	El Paso, Texas, United States (10 April 2010)
