= Jan Veleba (athlete) =

Czech sprinter

Jan Veleba (born 6 December 1986 in Brno) is a Czech athlete specialising in the sprinting events. He represented his country at three outdoor and two indoor European Championships.

== Competition record ==
Year	Competition	Venue	Position	Event	Notes
Representing the Czech Republic
2010	European Championships	Barcelona, Spain	30th (h)	100 m	10.68
2011	European Indoor Championships	Paris, France	15th (sf)	60 m	6.71
2012	European Championships	Helsinki, Finland	22nd (sf)	100 m	10.60
2012	European Championships	Helsinki, Finland	7th (h)	4 × 100 m relay	39.52^{1}
2014	European Championships	Zürich, Switzerland	13th (sf)	100 m	10.38
2015	European Indoor Championships	Prague, Czech Republic	20th (sf)	60 m	6.74
2016	European Championships	Amsterdam, Netherlands	16th (sf)	100 m	10.28
2017	European Indoor Championships	Belgrade, Serbia	16th (sf)	60 m	6.80
2018	European Championships	Berlin, Germany	25th (h)	100 m	10.52
2018	European Championships	Berlin, Germany	6th (h)	4 × 100 m relay	38.94^{2}
2019	World Relays	Yokohama, Japan	12th (h)	4 × 100 m relay	38.77
2021	European Indoor Championships	Toruń, Poland	32nd (h)	60 m	6.75
2021	World Relays	Chorzów, Poland	–	4 × 100 m relay	DNF
2024	European Championships	Rome, Italy	20th (h)	100 m	10.53
2024	European Championships	Rome, Italy	11th (h)	4 × 100 m relay	39.22

^{1}Did not finish in the final
^{2}Did not start in the final

== Personal bests ==
Outdoor

- 100 metres – 10.16 (+1.6 m/s) (Brno 2019)
- 200 metres – 20.86 (+2.0 m/s) (Tábor 2012)
- 400 metres – 48.81 (Prague 2008)

Indoor

- 60 metres – 6.65 (Prague 2011)
