= Ricardo Monteiro =

Portuguese sprinter

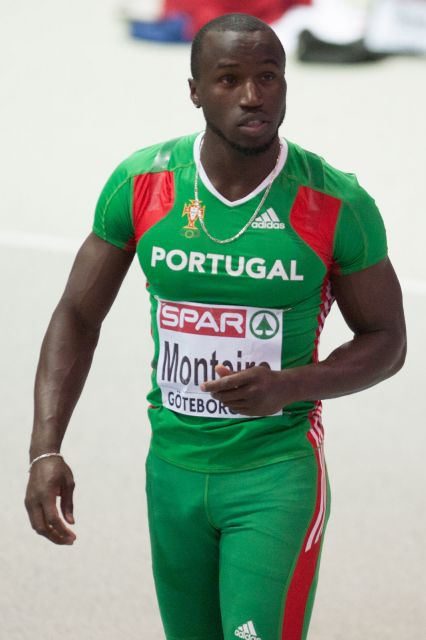
- Ricardo Monteiro in 2013

Personal information
- Born: 2 October 1985 (age 40)

Sport
- Sport: Athletics
- Event: 100 metres

Ricardo Monteiro (born 2 October 1985) is a Portuguese-French former sprinter. He represented his country in the 4 × 100 metres relay at the 2009 and 2011 World Championships without qualifying for the final.

== International competitions ==
Year	Competition	Venue	Position	Event	Notes
Representing Portugal
2006	Lusophony Games	Macau, China	3rd	100 m	10.83
2009	World Championships	Berlin, Germany	11th (h)	4 × 100 m relay	39.25
2010	Ibero-American Championships	San Fernando, Spain	11th (h)	100 m	10.62
2010	European Championships	Barcelona, Spain	6th	4 × 100 m relay	38.88
2011	World Championships	Daegu, South Korea	14th (h)	4 × 100 m relay	39.09
2012	European Championships	Helsinki, Finland	6th	4 × 100 m relay	39.96
2013	European Indoor Championships	Gothenburg, Sweden	15th (sf)	60 m	6.76

== Personal bests ==
Outdoor

- 100 metres – 10.30 (+1.0 m/s, Salamanca 2013)
- 200 metres – 21.97 (+1.5 m/s, Seixal 2006)

Indoor

- 60 metres – 6.72 (Lisbon 2013)
- 200 metres – 21.96 (Pombal 2010)
