= Tom Kling-Baptiste =

Swedish sprinter

Personal information
- Born: 29 August 1990 (age 35) Sundsvall, Sweden
- Education: Mid Sweden University

Sport
- Sport: Athletics
- Event(s): 100 m, 200 m
- Club: Huddinge AIS

Tom Kling-Baptiste (born 29 August 1990 in Sundsvall) is a Swedish athlete competing in sprinting events. He represented his country at the 2014 World Indoor Championships without advancing from the first round.

== International competitions ==
| Year | Competition | Venue | Position | Event | Notes |
Representing Sweden
| 2009 | European Junior Championships | Kaunas, Lithuania | 21st (sf) | 100 m | 10.84 |
| 2009 | European Junior Championships | Kaunas, Lithuania | 8th | 4x100 m relay | 40.56 |
| 2010 | European Championships | Barcelona, Spain | 29th (h) | 100 m | 10.64 |
| 2011 | European U23 Championships | Ostrava, Czech Republic | 16th (h) | 100 m | 10.74 |
| 2011 | European U23 Championships | Ostrava, Czech Republic | 9th (h) | 4x100 m relay | 40.45 |
| 2012 | European Championships | Helsinki, Finland | 11th (h) | 4x100 m relay | 39.87 |
| 2013 | European Indoor Championships | Gothenburg, Sweden | 11th (sf) | 60 m | 6.73 |
| 2014 | World Indoor Championships | Sopot, Poland | 29th (h) | 60 m | 6.72 |
| 2014 | European Championships | Zürich, Switzerland | 29th (h) | 100 m | 10.50 |
| 2014 | European Championships | Zürich, Switzerland | 10th (h) | 4x100 m relay | 39.27 |
| 2015 | Universiade | Gwangju, South Korea | 16th (qf) | 100 m | 10.59 |
| 2015 | Universiade | Gwangju, South Korea | 13th (sf) | 200 m | 21.30 |
| 2016 | European Championships | Amsterdam, Netherlands | 22nd (sf) | 200 m | 21.34 |
| 2016 | European Championships | Amsterdam, Netherlands | 11th (h) | 4x100 m relay | 39.37 |

== Personal bests ==
Outdoor

- 100 metres – 10.29 (+1.4 m/s, Skara 2014)
- 200 metres – 20.81 (+1.6 m/s, Söderhamn 2015)

Indoor

- 60 metres – 6.65 (Gothenburg 2014)
- 200 metres – 21.07 (Växjö 2016)
