= Odain Rose =

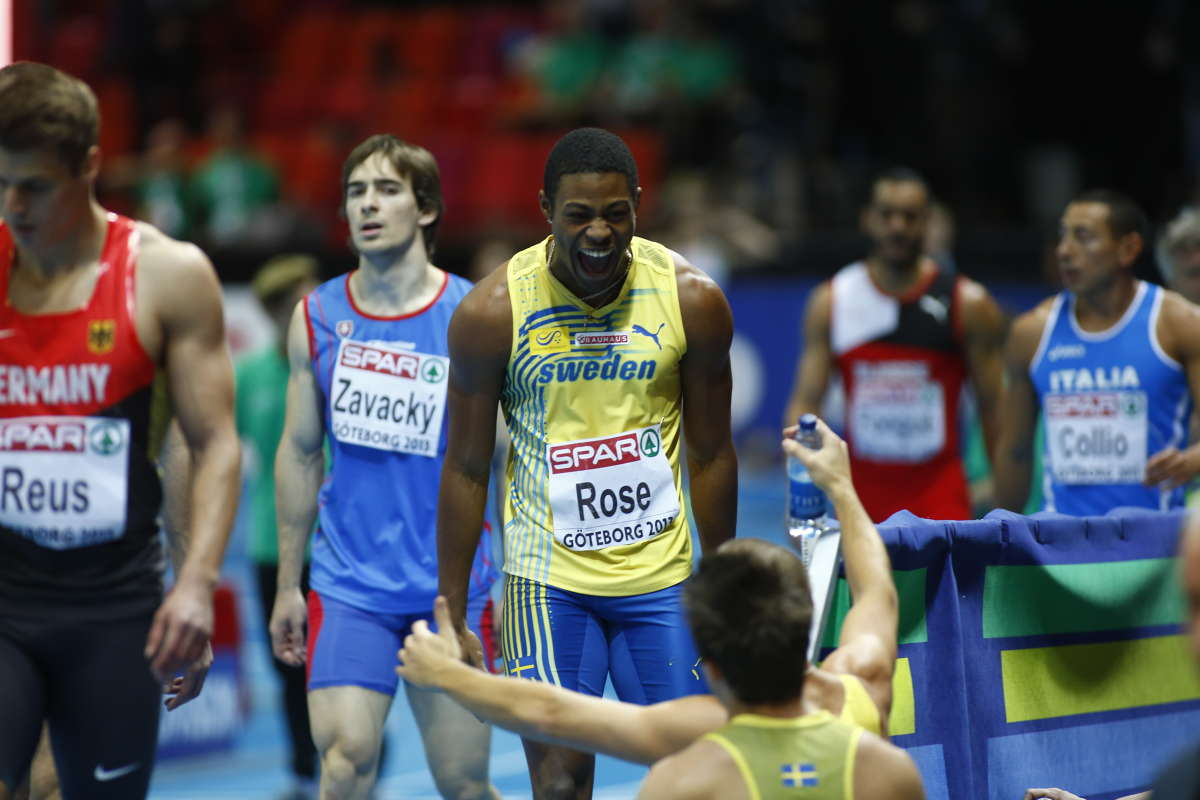
- Odain Rose at the 2013 European Indoor Championships

Personal information
- Born: 19 July 1992 (age 33) Port Antonio, Jamaica
- Education: Umeå University

Sport
- Sport: Athletics
- Event(s): 60 m, 100 m
- Club: IFK Umeå

Odain Rose (born 19 July 1992 in Port Antonio, Jamaica) is a Jamaican-born Swedish athlete specialising in the sprinting events. His biggest success to date is the fifth place in the 60 metres at the 2013 European Indoor Championships.

Born in Jamaica, Odain moved to Sweden with his mother at the age of three.

== Competition record ==
Year	Competition	Venue	Position	Event	Notes
Representing Sweden
2011	European Junior Championships	Tallinn, Estonia	12th (h)	100 m	10.80
2013	European Indoor Championships	Gothenburg, Sweden	5th	60 m	6.62
2014	World Indoor Championships	Sopot, Poland	28th (h)	60 m	6.71
2014	European Championships	Zurich, Switzerland	30th (h)	100 m	10.53
2015	European Indoor Championships	Prague, Czech Republic	20th (sf)	60 m	6.74
2015	Universiade	Gwangju, South Korea	24th (sf)	100 m	10.75
2016	World Indoor Championships	Portland, United States	24th (h)	60 m	6.69
2017	European Indoor Championships	Belgrade, Serbia	4th	60 m	6.63
2018	World Indoor Championships	Birmingham, United Kingdom	20th (sf)	60 m	6.74
2019	European Indoor Championships	Glasgow, United Kingdom	33rd (h)	60 m	6.88
2021	European Indoor Championships	Toruń, Poland	50th (h)	60 m	6.81

== Personal bests ==
Outdoor

- 100 metres – 10.30 (+1.8 m/s) (Gothenburg 2014)
- 200 metres – 21.65 (+1.1 m/s) (Jessheim 2012)

Indoor

- 60 metres – 6.62 (Gothenburg 2013)
