= Rolf Fongué =

Swiss sprinter (born 1987)

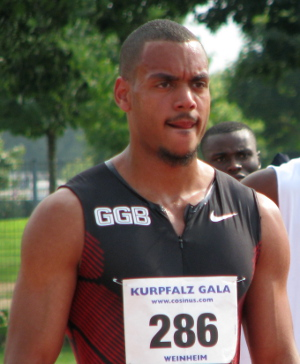
- Rolf Fongué in 2012

Personal information
- Born: 25 November 1987 (age 37) Sorengo, Switzerland

Sport
- Sport: Athletics
- Event(s): 60 m, 100 m
- Club: LC Zürich
- Coached by: Dieter Baumgartner

Rolf Malcolm Njouongué-Fongué (born 25 November 1987) is a Swiss sprinter. He represented his country in the 60 metres at the 2010 World Indoor Championships getting disqualifying in the first round.

He has a Cameroonian father and a Swiss mother. His brothers are also sportsmen, the younger Eric is a basketball player while the older Thierry is a handballer.

== International competitions ==
Year	Competition	Venue	Position	Event	Notes
Representing Switzerland
2005	European Junior Championships	Kaunas, Lithuania	3rd (h)	4 × 100 m relay	40.41
2006	World Junior Championships	Beijing, China	21st (sf)	4 × 100 m relay	11.03
2007	European U23 Championships	Debrecen, Hungary	29th (h)	100 m	10.83
2011	World Indoor Championships	Doha, Qatar	–	60 m	DQ
2012	European Championships	Helsinki, Finland	18th (sf)	100 m	10.50
2012	European Championships	Helsinki, Finland	5th	4 × 100 m relay	38.83
2013	European Indoor Championships	Gothenburg, Sweden	12th (sf)	60 m	6.75
2015	IAAF World Relays	Nassau, Bahamas	–	4 × 100 m relay	DNF

== Personal bests ==
Outdoor

- 100 metres – 10.25 (+1.5 m/s, Bulle 2012)
- 200 metres – 21.42 (0.0 m/s, Bern 2012)

Indoor

- 60 metres – 6.65 (Magglingen 2013)
- 200 metres – 22.12 (Magglingen 2013)

== Career after Athletics ==
In 2023, Fongué founded Fongué Performance & Consulting GmbH, a company based in Switzerland specializing in speed performance training for professional football players. His work focuses exclusively on football, aiming to improve players’ sprinting technique, acceleration, and overall speed performance on the pitch. Among the athletes he has accompanied are Swiss internationals Noah Okafor, Nico Elvedi, Silvan Hefti, as well as German international Ridle Baku.
