= 2011 European Athletics U23 Championships – Men's 100 metres =

The men's 100 metres at the 2011 European Athletics U23 Championships were held at the Městský stadion on 14 and 15 July.

== Medalists ==
Gold	(United Kingdom) James Alaka; Great Britain (GBR)
Silver	Michael Tumi; Italy (ITA)
Bronze	(United Kingdom) Andrew Robertson; Great Britain (GBR)

== Schedule ==
Date	Time	Round
14 July 2011	17:40	Round 1
15 July 2011	16:25	Final

== Results ==
=== Round 1 ===
Qualification: First 2 in each heat (Q) and 2 best performers (q) advance to the Final.

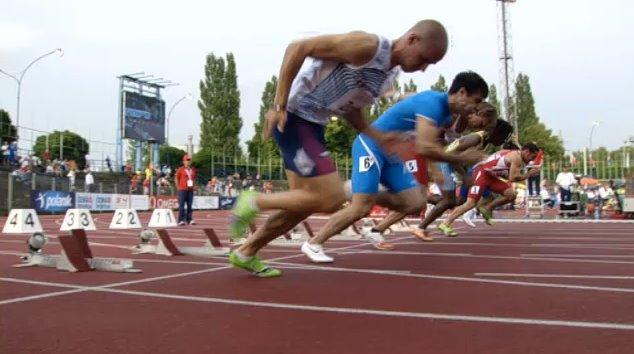
Heat 2

Rank	Heat	Name	Nationality	React	Time	Notes
1	2	Michael Tumi	Italy	0.166	10.48	Q
2	3	James Alaka	Great Britain	0.154	10.49	Q
3	1	Francesco Basciani	Italy	0.146	10.50	Q
4	1	Dániel Karlik	Hungary	0.163	10.52	Q
5	1	Eduard Viles	Spain	0.163	10.53	q
6	1	Andrew Robertson	Great Britain	0.170	10.54	q
7	1	Izzet Safer	Turkey	0.157	10.55	
8	3	Delmas Obou	Italy	0.155	10.57	Q
9	3	Pascal Mancini	Switzerland	0.149	10.63	
10	3	Ruslan Perestyuk	Ukraine	0.164	10.63	
11	3	Grzegorz Zimniewicz	Poland	0.194	10.64	
12	2	Elvijs Misans	Latvia	0.183	10.65	Q
13	2	Benjamin Olsson	Sweden	0.201	10.68	
14	3	Ben Bassaw	France	0.187	10.70	
15	2	Václav Zich	Czech Republic	0.157	10.71	
16	1	Tom Kling-Baptiste	Sweden	0.167	10.74	
16	3	Bruno Hortelano	Spain	0.206	10.74	
18	2	Dylan Rigot	France	0.256	10.80	
19	1	Benjamin Georg	France	0.189	10.83	
20	2	Darko Šarović	Serbia	0.157	10.97	

=== Final ===
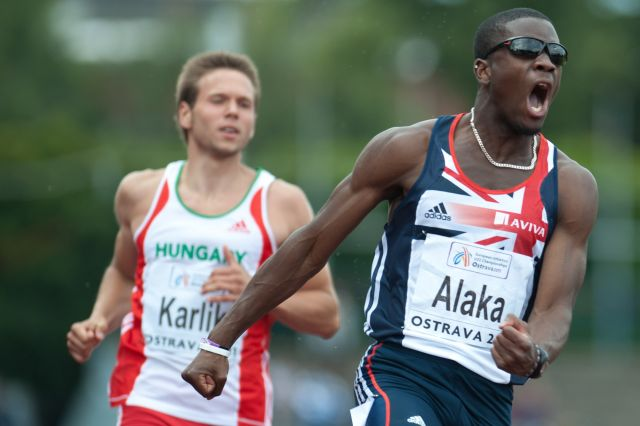
Gold medalist, James Alaka

Rank	Name	Nationality	React	Time	Notes
1st place, gold medalist(s)	James Alaka	Great Britain	0.167	10.45	
2nd place, silver medalist(s)	Michael Tumi	Italy	0.143	10.47	
3rd place, bronze medalist(s)	Andrew Robertson	Great Britain	0.141	10.52	
4	Francesco Basciani	Italy	0.145	10.57	
5	Delmas Obou	Italy	0.172	10.59	
6	Elvijs Misans	Latvia	0.251	10.63	
7	Daniel Karlik	Hungary	0.174	10.64	
8	Eduard Viles	Spain	0.183	10.69	
