= 2012 European Athletics Championships – Men's 4 × 100 metres relay =

Event in Helsinki

Men's 4 × 100 metres relay at the European Athletics Championships

The men's 4 × 100 metres relay at the 2012 European Athletics Championships was held at the Helsinki Olympic Stadium on 30 June and 1 July.

== Medalists ==
Gold	Brian Mariano, Churandy Martina; Giovanni Codrington, Patrick van Luijk; Netherlands
Silver	Julian Reus, Tobias Unger; Alexander Kosenkow, Lucas Jakubczyk; Germany
Bronze	Ronald Pognon, Christophe Lemaitre; Pierre-Alexis Pessonneaux, Emmanuel Biron; France

== Records ==
Standing records prior to the 2012 European Athletics Championships
World record	Jamaica; Nesta Carter, Michael Frater; Yohan Blake, Usain Bolt	37.04	Daegu, South Korea	4 September 2011
European record	United Kingdom; Jason Gardener, Darren Campbell; Marlon Devonish, Dwain Chambers	37.73	Seville, Spain	29 August 1999
Championship record	France; Max Moriniere, Daniel Sangouma; Jean-Charles Trouabal, Bruno Marie-Rose	37.79	Split, Yugoslavia	1 September 1990
World Leading	Racers Track Club; Mario Forsythe, Yohan Blake; Kimmari Roach, Usain Bolt	37.80	Kingston, Jamaica	14 April 2012
European Leading	Germany; Tobias Unger, Martin Keller; Alexander Kosenkow, Alex-Platini Menga	38.41	Weinheim, Germany	26 May 2012
Broken records during the 2012 European Athletics Championships
European Leading	Netherlands; Brian Mariano, Churandy Martina; Giovanni Codrington, Patrick van Luijk	38.34	Helsinki, Finland	1 July 2012

== Schedule ==
Date	Time	Round
30 June 2012	11:20	Round 1
1 July 2012	18:25	Final

== Results ==
=== Round 1 ===
First 3 in each heat (Q) and 2 best performers (q) advance to the Final.

Rank	Heat	Lane	Nation	Athletes	Time	Notes
1	1	5	Great Britain	Christian Malcolm, Dwain Chambers, James Ellington, Mark Lewis-Francis	38.98	Q
2	2	6	France	Emmanuel Biron, Christophe Lemaitre, Pierre-Alexis Pessonneaux, Jimmy Vicaut	39.01	Q, SB
3	2	7	Germany	Lucas Jakubczyk, Tobias Unger, Alexander Kosenkow, Martin Keller	39.04	Q
4	1	1	Russia	Mikhail Idrisov, Konstantin Petryashov, Vyacheslav Kolesnichenko, Pavel Karavaev	39.08	Q, SB
5	1	8	Netherlands	Brian Mariano, Churandy Martina, Jerrel Feller, Giovanni Codrington	39.34	Q
6	2	2	Switzerland	Alex Wilson, Reto Schenkel, Steven Gugerli, Marc Schneeberger	39.41	Q
7	2	4	Czech Republic	Jan Veleba, Rostislav Šulc, Vojtěch Šulc, Lukás Štastný	39.52	q
8	1	7	Portugal	Ricardo Monteiro, Dany Gonçalves, Arnaldo Abrantes, Yazaldes Nascimento	39.66	q, SB
9	2	5	Spain	Eduard Viles, Bruno Hortelano, Alberto Gavaldá, Diego Alonso	39.81	
10	1	6	Finland	Eetu Rantala, Visa Hongisto, Jonathan Åstrand, Ville Myllymäki	39.85	
11	1	4	Sweden	David Sennung, Benjamin Olsson, Tom Kling-Baptiste, Stefan Tärnhuvud	39.87	
12	1	2	Latvia	Ņikita Paņkins, Jānis Leitis, Sandis Sabâjevs, Jānis Mezītis	40.46	
13	2	8	Lithuania	Egidijus Dilys, Žilvinas Adomavičius, Martas Skrabulis, Aivaras Pranckevičius	40.68	
14	2	3	Turkey	Birol Yildirim, Furkan Şen, Aykut Ay, Yiğitcan Hekimoglu	41.42	
	2	1	Italy	Fabio Cerutti, Simone Collio, Emanuele Di Gregorio, Jacques Riparelli	DNF	
	1	3	Poland	Jakub Adamski, Dariusz Kuć, Robert Kubaczyk, Kamil Kryński	DNF	

=== Final ===
Rank	Lane	Nation	Athletes	Time	Notes
1st place, gold medalist(s)	8	Netherlands	Brian Mariano, Churandy Martina, Giovanni Codrington, Patrick van Luijk	38.34	EL, NR
2nd place, silver medalist(s)	3	Germany	Julian Reus, Tobias Unger, Alexander Kosenkow, Lucas Jakubczyk	38.44	
3rd place, bronze medalist(s)	5	France	Ronald Pognon, Christophe Lemaitre, Pierre-Alexis Pessonneaux, Emmanuel Biron	38.46	
4	6	Russia	Mikhail Idrisov, Konstantin Petryashov, Vyacheslav Kolesnichenko, Pavel Karavaev	38.67	
5	7	Switzerland	Alex Wilson, Marc Schneeberger, Reto Schenkel, Rolf Fongué	38.83	
6	1	Portugal	Ricardo Monteiro, Dany Gonçalves, Diogo Antunes, Yazaldes Nascimento	39.96	
	2	Czech Republic	Jan Veleba, Rostislav Šulc, Vojtěch Šulc, Lukás Štastný	DNF	
	4	Great Britain	Christian Malcolm, Dwain Chambers, James Ellington, Mark Lewis-Francis	DNF	
