= 2017 European Athletics Indoor Championships – Men's 60 metres =

The men's 60 metres event at the 2017 European Athletics Indoor Championships was held on 4 March 2017 at 10:20 (heats), at 18:35 (semifinals) and 20:57 (final) local time.

== Medalists ==
Gold	Silver	Bronze
Richard Kilty; United Kingdom	Ján Volko; Slovakia	Austin Hamilton; Sweden

== Records ==
Standing records prior to the 2017 European Athletics Indoor Championships
World record	Maurice Greene (USA)	6.39	Madrid, Spain	3 February 1998
World record	Maurice Greene (USA)	6.39	Atlanta, United States	3 March 2001
European record	Dwain Chambers (GBR)	6.42	Turin, Italy	7 March 2009
Championship record	Dwain Chambers (GBR)	6.42	Turin, Italy	7 March 2009
World Leading	Ronnie Baker (USA)	6.46	Toruń, Poland	10 February 2017
European Leading	Chijindu Ujah (GBR)	6.56	Toruń, Poland	10 February 2017

== Results ==
=== Heats ===
Qualification: First 3 in each heat (Q) and the next 4 fastest (q) advance to the Semifinal.

Rank	Heat	Athlete	Nationality	Time	Note
1	2	Richard Kilty	Great Britain	6.61	Q
2	3	Theo Etienne	Great Britain	6.62	Q
3	3	Austin Hamilton	Sweden	6.65	Q, PB
4	4	Andrew Robertson	Great Britain	6.66	Q
5	2	Ján Volko	Slovakia	6.68	Q
5	2	Aleixo-Platini Menga	Germany	6.68	Q
7	4	Michael Tumi	Italy	6.69	Q
8	2	Sulayman Bah	Sweden	6.71	q
9	4	Odain Rose	Sweden	6.72	Q
10	3	Marvin René	France	6.73	Q
10	2	Eetu Rantala	Finland	6.73	q
12	3	Ancuiam Lopes	Portugal	6.74	q
13	1	Pascal Mancini	Switzerland	6.76	Q
13	4	Petre Rezmives	Romania	6.76	q
15	1	Jan Veleba	Czech Republic	6.77	Q
15	4	János Sipos	Hungary	6.77	
17	3	Ángel David Rodríguez	Spain	6.79	
17	3	Zvonimir Ivašković	Croatia	6.79	
19	1	Volodymyr Suprun	Ukraine	6.80	Q
20	1	Kristoffer Hari	Denmark	6.81	
21	1	Denis Dimitrov	Bulgaria	6.82	
22	1	Markus Fuchs	Austria	6.84	
23	2	Luke Bezzina	Malta	7.02	SB
24	2	Sashko Golubikj	Macedonia	7.07	
25	4	Francesco Molinari	San Marino	7.11	
26	4	Jerrai Torres	Gibraltar	7.23	

=== Semifinals ===
Qualification: First 4 in each heat (Q) advance to the Final.

Rank	Heat	Athlete	Nationality	Time	Note
1	1	Richard Kilty	Great Britain	6.58	Q
2	2	Theo Etienne	Great Britain	6.59	Q
3	2	Ján Volko	Slovakia	6.62	Q, NR
4	2	Andrew Robertson	Great Britain	6.63	Q
5	1	Pascal Mancini	Switzerland	6.66	Q
5	2	Odain Rose	Sweden	6.66	Q, SB
7	1	Austin Hamilton	Sweden	6.67	Q
8	2	Marvin René	France	6.70	
9	2	Ancuiam Lopes	Portugal	6.71	PB
10	1	Sulayman Bah	Sweden	6.72	Q
10	2	Michael Tumi	Italy	6.72	
12	1	Aleixo-Platini Menga	Germany	6.73	
13	1	Eetu Rantala	Finland	6.75	
13	1	Volodymyr Suprun	Ukraine	6.75	
15	2	Petre Rezmives	Romania	6.79	
16	1	Jan Veleba	Czech Republic	6.80	

=== Final ===
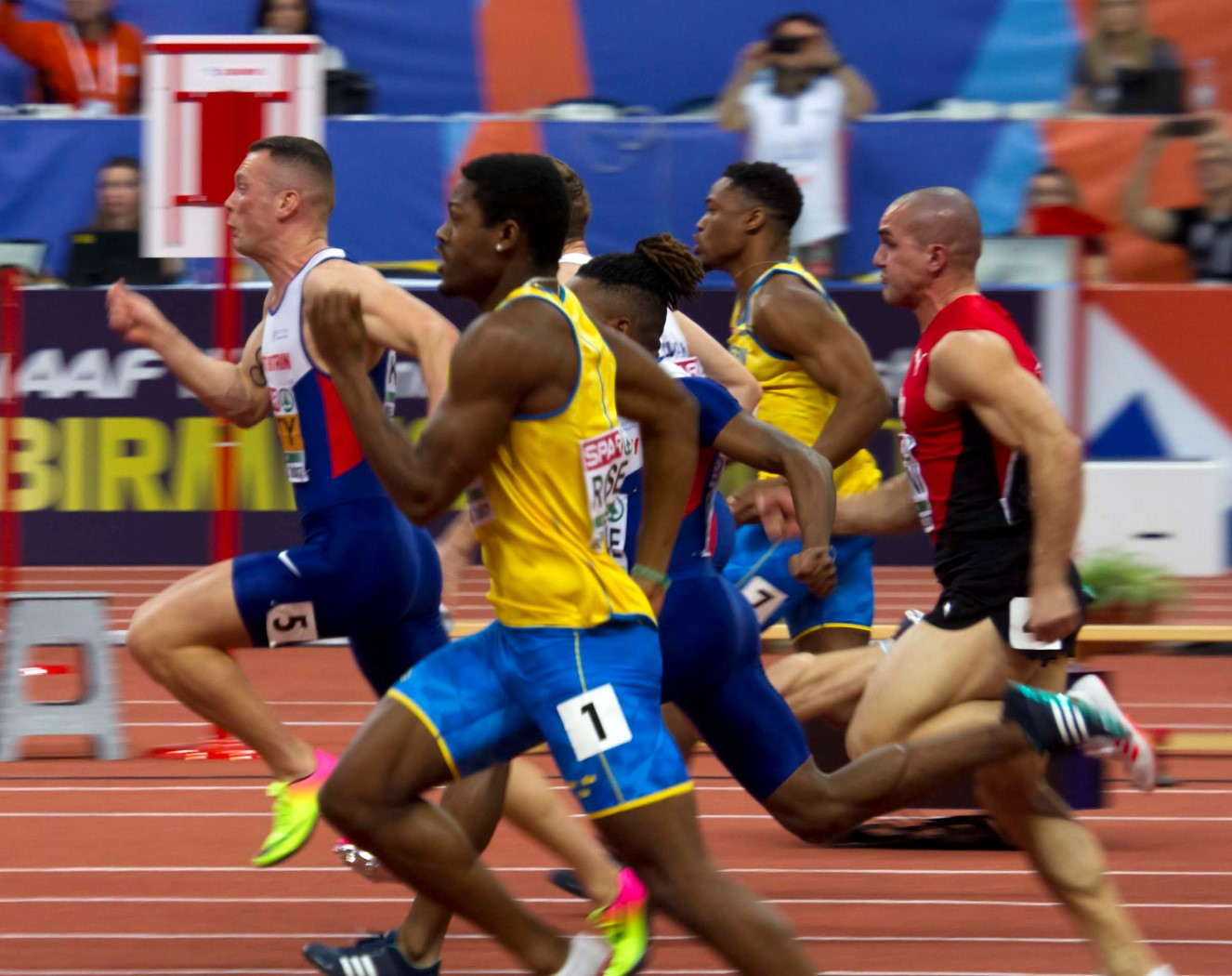
The final

Rank	Lane	Athlete	Nationality	Time	Note
1st place, gold medalist(s)	5	Richard Kilty	Great Britain	6.54	EL
2nd place, silver medalist(s)	6	Ján Volko	Slovakia	6.58	NR
3rd place, bronze medalist(s)	7	Austin Hamilton	Sweden	6.63	PB
4	1	Odain Rose	Sweden	6.63	SB
5	3	Theo Etienne	Great Britain	6.67	
6	4	Pascal Mancini	Switzerland	6.70	
7	2	Sulayman Bah	Sweden	6.96	
	8	Andrew Robertson	Great Britain	DQ	R162.7
