= Michael Tumi =

Italian sprinter (born 1990)

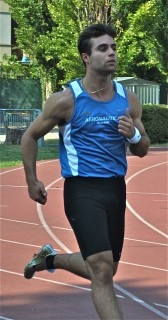
- Tumi with the jersey of the Aeronautica

Personal information
- Nationality: Italian
- Born: February 12, 1990 (age 36) Padua, Italy
- Height: 1.83 m (6 ft 0 in)
- Weight: 82 kg (181 lb)

Sport
- Country: Italy
- Sport: Athletics
- Event: Sprint
- Club: C.S. Aeronautica Militare; G.S. Fiamme Oro

Achievements and titles
- Personal bests: 100 m: 10.19 (2013); 60 m indoor: 6.51 (2013)
Medal record
European Indoor Championships
Bronze medal – third place	2013 Gothenburg	60 metres
Mediterranean Games
Gold medal – first place	2013 Mersin	4×100 m relay
Bronze medal – third place	2013 Mersin	100 metres
European U23 Championships
Gold medal – first place	Ostrava 2011	4×100 m relay
Silver medal – second place	Ostrava 2011	100 metres

Michael Tumi (born 12 February 1990 in Padua) is an Italian sprinter.

== Biography ==
He placed second at 2011 European Athletics U23 Championships in Ostrava, where he set a personal best in the 100 metres at 10.19 seconds (+0.1). He has won individual national championships four times.

In 2013, Tumi set a new Italian national record in the 60 meters, beating a 23-year-old record set by Pierfrancesco Pavoni in 1990. He won the bronze medal at the European Championships in athletics over the same distance.

== National records ==
- 60 metres indoor: 6.51 ( (Italy) Ancona, 17 February 2013) - Current holder

== Achievements ==
Year	Competition	Venue	Position	Event	Time	Notes
2011	European U23 Championships	(Czech Republic) Ostrava	2nd	100m	10.47	
2011	European U23 Championships	(Czech Republic) Ostrava	1st	4 × 100 m relay	39.05	
2011	World Championships	(South Korea) Daegu	5th	4×100 metres relay	38.96	
2013	European Indoor Championships	(Sweden) Gothenburg	3rd	60 metres	6.52	
2013	Mediterranean Games	(Turkey) Mersin	3rd	100 metres	10.26	
2013	Mediterranean Games	(Turkey) Mersin	1st	4 × 100 m relay	39.06	
2015	European Indoor Championships	(Czech Republic) Prague	4th	60 metres	6.61	
2017	European Indoor Championships	Serbia	10th (sf)	60 m	6.72	

== National titles ==
- 5 wins in the 60 metres indoor (2011, 2012, 2013, 2016, 2018)

== See also ==
- Italian records in athletics
- Italy national relay team
- Italian all-time top lists - 100 metres
