= Pro Athlé Tour =

The Pro Athlé Tour (formerly the Alma Athlé Tour) is a series of the foremost annual outdoor track and field meetings in France. It is organised by the Ligue Nationale d’Athlétisme (LNA) and the Fédération française d'athlétisme. The series was sponsored by Groupe Lagardère from 2006 to 2008 and Alma Consulting Group held the title sponsor role in 2009 and 2010.

The meetings feature elite-level competition of both an international and national nature. The world best in the 2000 metres steeplechase was beaten twice on the 2010 tour, first by Bouabdellah Tahri and then by Mahiedine Mekhissi-Benabbad. At the first meeting of the 2011 series, Christophe Lemaitre improved the French record in the 100 metres to 9.96 seconds in Montreuil.

The series currently comprises five meetings:

- Meeting de Montreuil
- Meeting de Stanislas-Nancy
- Meeting de Sotteville-lès-Rouen
- Meeting de la ville de Reims
- Herculis (Monaco)

A sixth meeting, the Meeting Lille Métropole, was previously part of the circuit but it was dropped for the 2011 series.
