= Jimmy Vicaut =

French sprinter

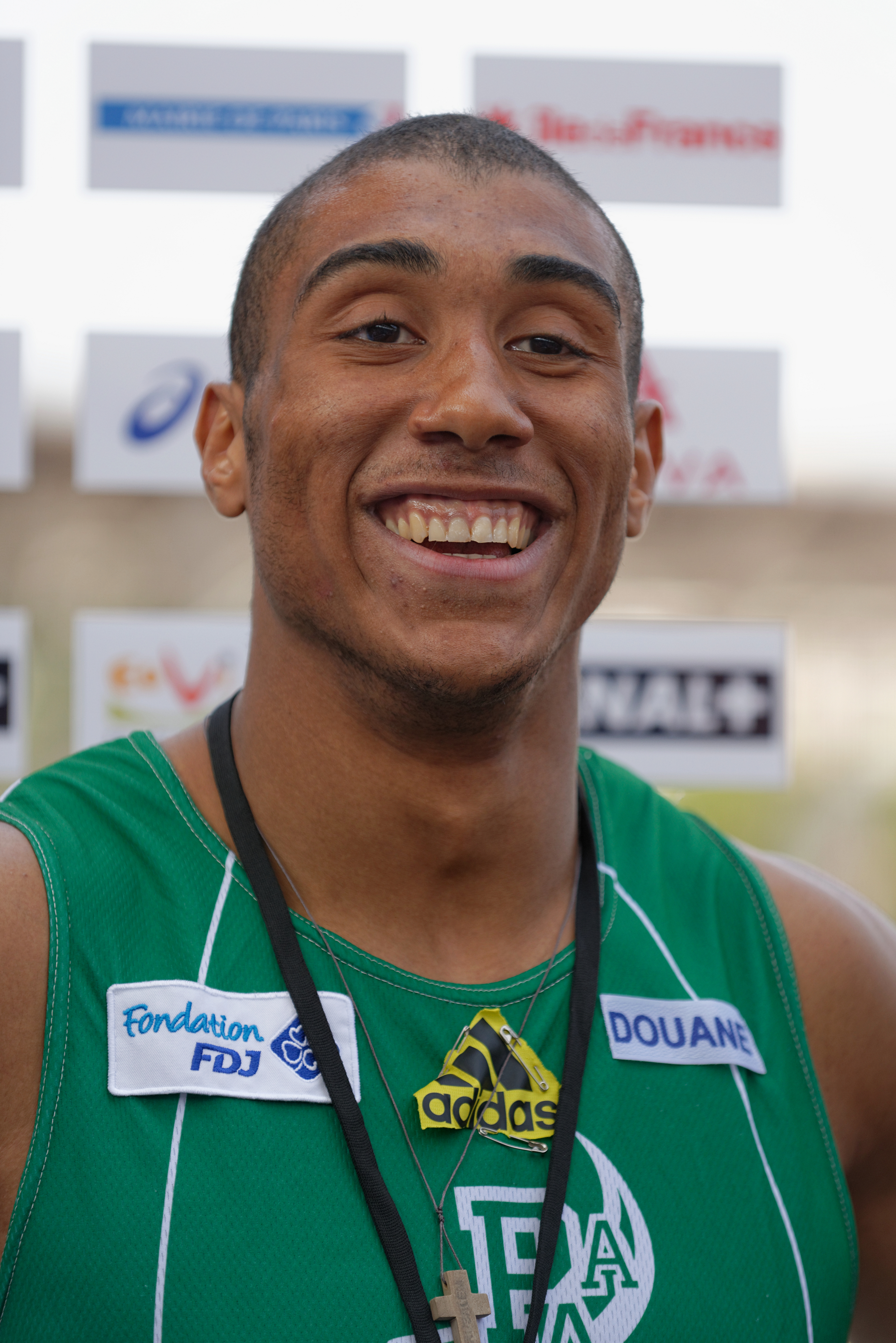
- Vicaut at the 2013 French Championships

Personal information
- Born: 27 February 1992 (age 34) Bondy, Seine-Saint-Denis, France
- Height: 1.88 m (6 ft 2 in)
- Weight: 83 kg (183 lb)

Sport
- Country: France
- Sport: Athletics (Sprint)
- Events: 60 metres, 100 metres, 200 metres
- Coached by: Guy Ontanon

Achievements and titles
- Personal bests: 100 m outdoor: 9.86 (Paris 2015, Montreuil 2016) 200 m outdoor: 20.30 (Paris 2013) 60 m indoor: 6.48 (Gothenburg 2013)
Medal record
Men's athletics
Representing France
Olympic Games
Bronze medal – third place	2012 London	4 × 100 m relay
World Championships
Silver medal – second place	2011 Daegu	4 × 100 m relay
European Championships
Gold medal – first place	2010 Barcelona	4 × 100 m relay
Silver medal – second place	2012 Helsinki	100 m
Silver medal – second place	2022 Munich	4 × 100 m relay
Silver medal – second place	2016 Amsterdam	4 × 100 m relay
Bronze medal – third place	2012 Helsinki	4 × 100 m relay
Bronze medal – third place	2016 Amsterdam	100 m
European Indoor Championships
Gold medal – first place	2013 Gothenburg	60 m
European Games
Bronze medal – third place	2023 Kraków-Małopolska	4 × 100 m relay
World Junior Championships
Bronze medal – third place	2010 Moncton	100 m
European Junior Championships
Gold medal – first place	2011 Tallinn	100 m
Gold medal – first place	2011 Tallinn	4 × 100 m relay

Jimmy Vicaut (born 27 February 1992 in Bondy, Seine-Saint-Denis) is a French sprinter who specializes in the 100 and 200 metres. His personal best of 9.86 in the 100 m is the joint second fastest time of any European athlete.

== Biography ==
Vicaut was born to a French father and an Ivorian mother. He began athletics at the age of ten years and has specialized in the sprint. He won the bronze medal at the 2010 World Junior Championships in Athletics in Moncton, Canada and promptly travelled to Barcelona to help the French men's 4 × 100 metres relay team to the gold medal at the 2010 European Athletics Championships.

Vicaut's junior personal best over 100 m, 10.07 seconds, is the fourth fastest time ever run by a European junior, behind only Christophe Lemaitre (10.04), Adam Gemili (10.05) and Dwain Chambers (10.06).

At the French national championships in Albi on 29 July 2011, Vicaut finished second behind Christophe Lemaitre, tying his personal best of 10.07 sec. Lemaitre set a new French national record with 9.92 sec.

At the 2011 World Championships in Daegu, Vicaut became only the second junior to ever run in a World Championship 100 m final, after Darrel Brown in 2003. Vicaut finished sixth with 10.27 sec, while his fellow countryman Lemaitre finished fourth with 10.19 sec.

At the 2012 Summer Olympics, Vicaut was part of France's 4 × 100 m relay team that claimed the bronze medal.

On 13 July 2013, at the French national championships in Paris, Vicaut won the title in 9.95 sec., a personal best.

At the 2013 World Championships in Moscow, Vicaut took part in three events—the 100 metres, 200 metres and 4 × 100 metres relay. He was eliminated in the semi-finals of the 100 and 200 metres events, while his relay team did not advance to the final from the heats.

In 2015, Vicaut equalled the European 100 m record time of 9.86 that Portugal's Francis Obikwelu had set almost 11 years before at the Olympic Games in Athens. That time also broke the French national record of 9.92 set by Lemaitre in 2011.

In June 2016, ahead of the Rio Summer Olympics, Vicaut equalled again his 9.86 time on the 100 metre dash at the Pro Athlé Tour meeting in Montreuil.

His younger brother, Willy, also an athlete, competes in the shot put.

== Personal bests ==
Distance	Time	venue
100 m (outdoor)	9.86 s	Paris (4 July 2015); Montreuil (7 June 2016)
200 m (outdoor)	20.30 s	Paris (6 July 2013)
60 m (indoor)	6.48 s	Gothenburg (2 March 2013) Birmingham (15 February 2014)

=== Track records ===
As of September 2024, Vicault holds the following track records for 100 metres.

Location	Time	Windspeed m/s	Date
Aix-les-Bains	9.95	+1.7	18 May 2014
Angers	9.88	+1.9	25 June 2016
Dijon	9.97	+0.5	21 May 2017
Grenoble	10.00	+1.6	20 May 2018
La Roche-sur-Yon	10.06	−1.2	3 September 2021
Marseille	9.92	+0.3	16 June 2018
Montreuil, Seine-Saint-Denis	9.86; NR	+1.8	7 June 2016
Saint-Étienne	10.02	+1.4	26 July 2019
Tallinn	10.07	+0.3	22 July 2011
Tourcoing	10.02	−0.7	24 May 2015

Records
Preceded by (Portugal) Francis Obikwelu	Men's 100 metres European Record Holder; 4 July 2015 – 1 August 2021 (shared with (Portugal) Francis Obikwelu)	Succeeded by (Italy) Marcell Jacobs
