= Lucas Jakubczyk =

German athlete (born 1985)

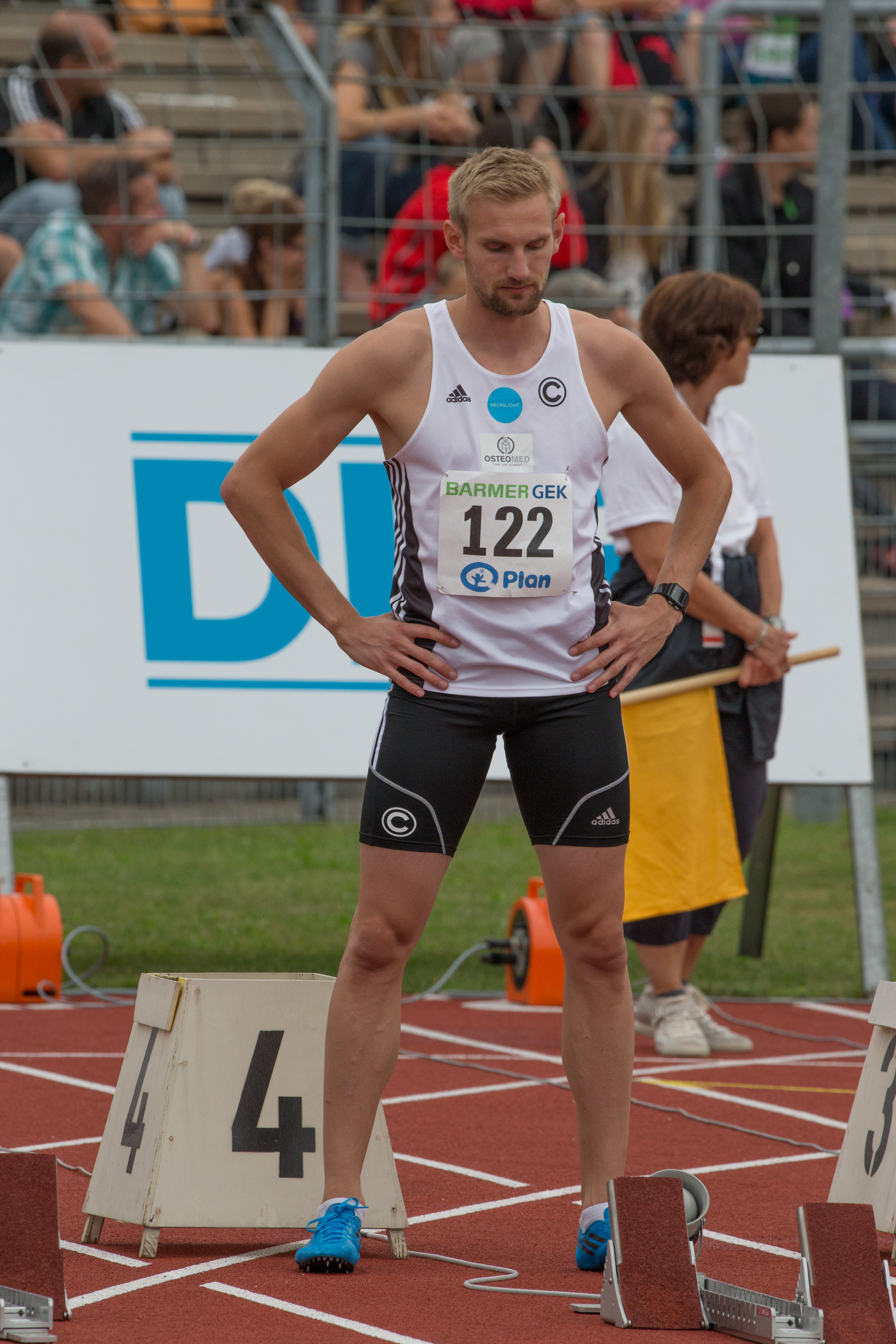
- Lucas Jakubczyk in 2014

Personal information
- Full name: Lucas Jakubczyk
- Born: 28 April 1985 (age 41) Plauen, East Germany
- Height: 1.83 m (6 ft 0 in)
- Weight: 78 kg (172 lb)

Sport
- Country: Germany
- Sport: Athletics
- Event(s): Sprint, long jump

Achievements and titles
- Regional finals: 2nd at the 2012 European Athletics Championships
Medal record
European Championships
Silver medal – second place	2012 Helsinki	4 × 100 m relay
Silver medal – second place	2014 Zürich	4 × 100 m relay
Bronze medal – third place	2016 Amsterdam	4 × 100 m relay

Lucas Jakubczyk (born 28 April 1985) is a German athlete who competes in the sprint and long jump with a personal best time of 10.07 seconds at the 100 metres event.

Jakubczyk won silver medals at the 2012 European Athletics Championships in Helsinki and 2014 European Athletics Championships in Zurich in the 4 × 100 metres relay.

Jakubczyk competed in the 2012 London Summer Olympic Games and the 2016 Rio de Janeiro Summer Olympic Games for team Germany.
