= Emmanuel Biron =

French sprinter

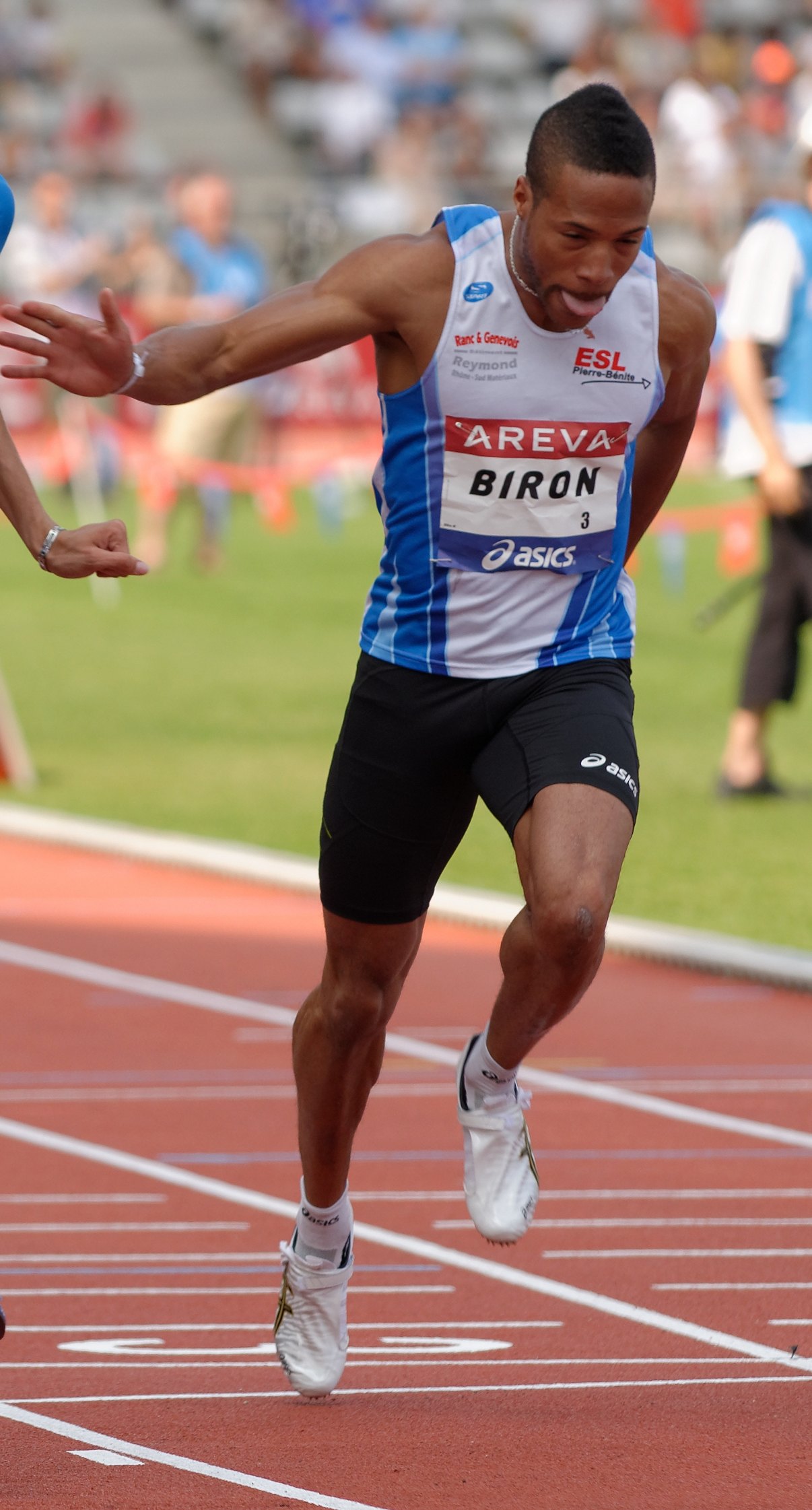
Emmanuel Biron in 2013

Emmanuel Biron (born 29 July 1988, in Lyon) is a French sprinter.

== Achievements ==
Year	Competition	Venue	Position	Event	Notes
Representing France
2006	World Junior Championships	Beijing, China	17th (q)	Long jump	7.35 m (wind: -0.4 m/s)
2006	World Junior Championships	Beijing, China	8th (h)	4 × 400 m relay	3:07.76
2009	European U23 Championships	Kaunas, Lithuania	10th	Long jump	7.54 m (wind: -0.5 m/s)
2009	European U23 Championships	Kaunas, Lithuania	2nd	4 × 100 m relay	39.26
2012	World Indoor Championships	Istanbul, Turkey	6th	60 m	6.63
2012	European Championships	Helsinki, Finland	3rd	4×100 metres	38.46
2013	Mediterranean Games	Mersin, Turkey	1st	100 m	10.22
2015	European Indoor Championships	Prague, Czech Republic	7th	60 m	6.72
2015	World Championships	Beijing, China	5th	4 × 100 m relay	38.23
