= Francis Obikwelu =

Nigerian-born Portuguese sprinter (born 1978)

GOIH Francis Obikwelu
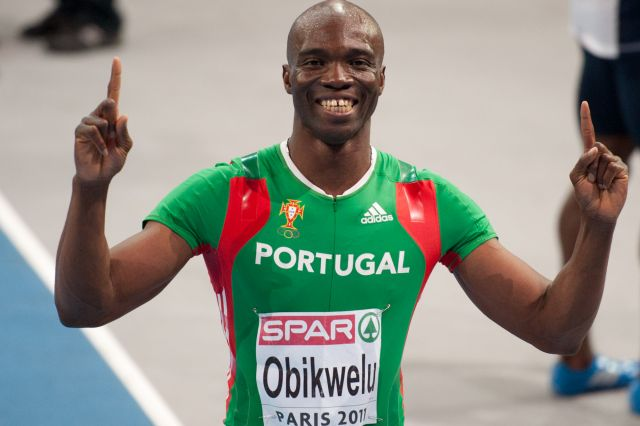
- Obikwelu in 2011

Personal information
- Full name: Francis Obiorah Obikwelu
- Nationality: Portuguese
- Born: 22 November 1978 (age 47) Onitsha, Anambra State, Nigeria
- Height: 1.90 m (6 ft 3 in)
- Weight: 78 kg (172 lb)

Sport
- Sport: Track and field
- Events: 100 metres, 200 metres
Medal record
Men's Athletics
Representing Nigeria
World Junior Championships
Gold medal – first place	1996 Sydney	100 m
Gold medal – first place	1996 Sydney	200 m
World Championships
Silver medal – second place	1997 Athens	4 × 100 m relay
Bronze medal – third place	1999 Seville	200 m
All-Africa Games
Gold medal – first place	1999 Johannesburg	200 m
Representing Portugal
Olympic Games
Silver medal – second place	2004 Athens	100 m
European Championships
Gold medal – first place	2002 Munich	100 m
Gold medal – first place	2006 Gothenburg	100 m
Gold medal – first place	2006 Gothenburg	200 m
Silver medal – second place	2002 Munich	200 m
European Indoor Championships
Gold medal – first place	2011 Paris	60 m
Lusophony Games
Gold medal – first place	2009 Lisbon	100 m
Representing Europe
IAAF World Cup
Gold medal – first place	2002 Madrid	200 m
Silver medal – second place	2006 Athens	100 m
Bronze medal – third place	2002 Madrid	100 m

Francis Obiorah Obikwelu, GOIH (born 22 November 1978) is a retired Nigerian-born Portuguese sprinter, who specialized in 100 metres and 200 metres. He was the 2004 Olympic silver medalist in the 100 metres. In the same race, he set the European record in the event at 9.86 seconds, which stood for nearly 17 years. At club level, he was a professional athlete for Sporting CP.

== Biography ==
Obikwelu was born in Onitsha, Nigeria. At the age of 14, one of Obikwelu's football coaches noticed him and suggested he try out athletics. After two years, he represented Nigeria in the 1994 African Junior Championships and won the silver medal in the 400 metres.

Obikwelu moved to Lisbon, Portugal as a 16-year-old. After being rejected by both Sport Lisboa e Benfica and Sporting Clube de Portugal, he worked as a construction worker in the Algarve. He decided to learn Portuguese, and his teacher put him in contact with sports club Belenenses, where he resumed practising in 1995 before signing for Sporting Clube de Portugal in 1996. While living in Portugal, Obikwelu was adopted by a lady who he now refers to as his "mother".

In July 2000, Lisbon-based Nigerian sprinter Mercy Nku said Obikwelu had decided to compete for Portugal because of neglect by Nigerian sports officials when he was injured while representing Nigeria in Sydney, Australia. "He had to go to Canada to undergo an operation on his knee spending his own money." Obikwelu became a Portuguese citizen in October 2001.

Obikwelu's athletics achievements, his life story and his personality made him a popular figure in Portugal, where he is nicknamed Chico, the short form of the Portuguese version of his first name.

In 2019, Obikwelu was reported to have worked as a speed trainer, on a temporary basis, for fellow Portuguese athlete, footballer Cristiano Ronaldo.

== Athletics career ==
Obikwelu finished second in the 100 m at the 2004 Summer Olympics in Athens, Greece, the first medal ever in athletics sprinting events for Portugal. In the qualifiers at the 2004 Summer Olympics he ran two times under ten seconds, setting a national record. In the final he recovered from a non-medal position in the second half of the race to win silver, just one-hundredth of a second behind Justin Gatlin and one-hundredth ahead of Maurice Greene, beating the former European record set by Linford Christie in 1993. Obikwelu finished fifth in the 200 m.

He won 100 m and 200 m in 2006 at the European Championships in Athletics and became the first male athlete to win both 100 m and 200 m in the European Championship.

Obikwelu was voted Waterford Crystal European Male Athlete of the Year for 2006 by the European Athletic Association, in an internet poll open to member federations, media and the general public.

Obikwelu announced his retirement from competitive athletics after failing to qualify for the 100 m finals in the 2008 Beijing Olympics, but retracted his statement, agreeing to honour the last year of his contract with his track club. Obikwelu won the 100 m gold medal at the 2009 Lusophony Games.

== Statistics ==
As of 9 September 2008

=== Personal bests ===
As of August 2024, the highlighted time for 200 metres is a track record.

Event	Time (seconds)	Venue	Date
50 metres	5.79	Liévin, France	28 February 2004
60 metres	6.53	Paris, France	5 March 2011
100 metres	9.86	Athens, Greece	22 August 2004
200 metres	19.84	Seville, Spain	25 August 1999
400 metres	46.29	Unknown	3 June 1998

- All information from IAAF Profile

=== Awards and honours ===
==== Olympic Games ====
2nd 100 m, 2004 Athens, GRE 9.86
5th 200 m, 2004 Athens, GRE 20.14

==== World Championships ====
2nd 4 × 100 m Relay 1997 Athens, GRE 38.07
3rd 200 m 1999 Seville, ESP 20.11

==== World Indoor Championships ====
3rd 200 m 1997 Paris, FRA 21.10

==== European Indoor Championships ====
1st 60 m 2011 Paris, FRA 6.53

==== European Championships ====
1st 100 m 2002 Munich, GER
2nd 200 m 2002 Munich, GER
1st 100 m 2006 Goteborg, SWE 9.99
1st 200 m 2006 Goteborg, SWE 20.01

==== Golden League ====
1st 100 m 2004 Saint-Denis, FRA 10.06
1st 200 m 2004 Saint-Denis, FRA 20.12
1st 100 m 2001 Berlin, GER 9.98
2nd 100 m 2002 Brussels, BEL 10.01
3rd 200 m 2004 Zurich, SUI 20.36
3rd 200 m 2004 Bergen, NOR 20.46
1st 100 m 2008 Madrid. ESP 10.04

==== Grand Prix ====
1st 100 m 2002 Lausanne, SUI 10.09
3rd 200 m 2001 Athens, GRE 20.59
3rd 200 m 2001 Nice, FRA 20.41

==== Grand Prix Final ====
3rd 200 m 2001 Melbourne, AUS 20.52
5th 100 m 2002 Saint-Denis, FRA 10.03

==== Super Grand Prix ====
1st 200 m 2004 Madrid, ESP 20.29
2nd 100 m 2004 Lausanne, SUI 10.02
2nd 200 m 2003 Madrid, ESP 20.59

Obikwelu was the 1996 world junior champion over 100 m and 200 m.

=== Orders ===
- Grand Cross of the Order of Prince Henry

=== Track records ===
As of September 2024, Obikwelu holds the following track records for 100 metres and 200 metres.

==== 100 metres ====
Location	Time	Windspeed m/s	Date
Braga	9.98	+2.0	21/06/2000
Castellón de la Plana	10.09	+2.2	30/05/2009
Istanbul	10.02	+4.0	19/06/2004
Lisbon	10.05	+1.8	05/06/2004
Seixal	10.06	+3.0	25/07/2009
Zaragoza	9.84	+5.4	03/06/2006

==== 200 metres ====
Location	Time	Windspeed m/s	Date
Monachil	20.27	+4.1	09/07/1997
Seville	19.84; PB	+1.7	25/08/1999

Awards
Preceded by (Lithuania) Virgilijus Alekna	Men's European Athlete of the Year; 2006	Succeeded by (Finland) Tero Pitkämäki
Preceded by José Veras	Portuguese Sportsman of the Year; 2006	Succeeded by Nelson Évora
Sporting positions
Preceded by (Trinidad and Tobago) Ato Boldon	Men's 200 m Best Year Performance; 1999	Succeeded by (United States) Michael Johnson
Records
Preceded by (United Kingdom) Linford Christie	European Record Holder Men's 100 m 22 August 2004 – 1 August 2021 (shared with (France) Jimmy Vicaut from 4 July 2015)	Succeeded by (Italy) Marcell Jacobs
