= Ronalds Arājs =

Latvian sprinter (born 1987)

Personal information
- Nationality: Latvian
- Born: 29 November 1987 (age 38) Tukums, Latvian SSR, Soviet Union
- Height: 1.83 m (6 ft 0 in)
- Weight: 90 kg (198 lb)

Sport
- Country: Latvia
- Sport: Track and field
- Event: Sprint

Achievements and titles
- Olympic finals: 2008
- Personal bests: 100m: 10.18s; 200m: 20.75s

Ronalds Arājs (born 29 November 1987 in Tukums) is a Latvian athlete. Arājs is the current Latvian record holder in the 100 metres sprint, having a personal best of 10.18 seconds. His personal record in the 200 metres is 20.75 seconds.

Arājs attended high school in El Paso, Texas. He competed for the UTEP Miners track and field team.

Arājs represented Latvia at the 2008 Summer Olympics in Beijing. He competed at the 200 metres and placed fifth in his first round heat in a time of 21.22 seconds, which was not fast enough to qualify for the second round.

He has expressed his intentions of converting towards bobsleigh after the 2012 Summer Olympics in London.
