= Harry Aikines-Aryeetey =

British sprinter (born 1988)

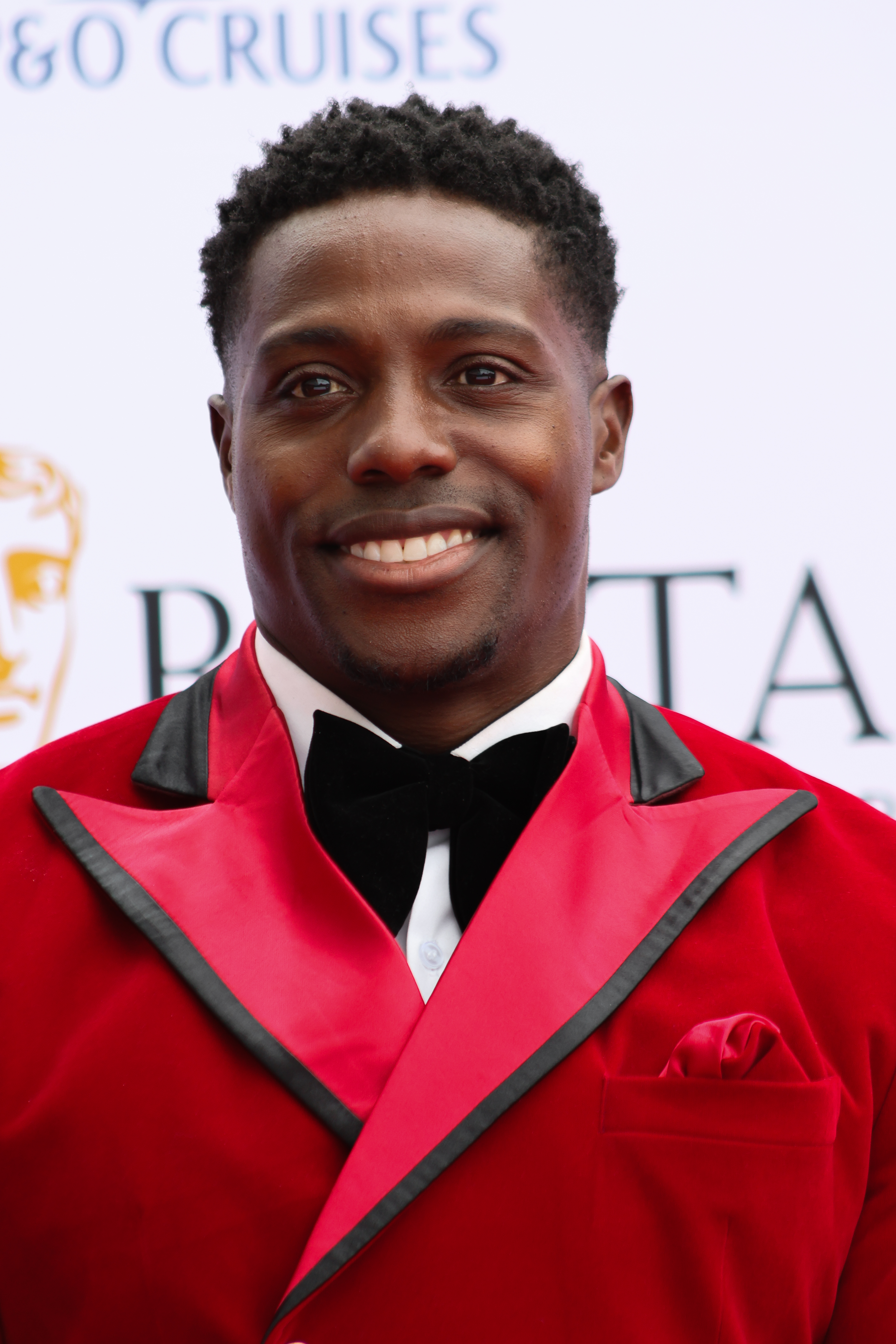
- Aikines-Aryeetey at the 2026 BAFTA Television Awards

Personal information
- Nicknames: Harry A-A; Nitro
- Born: 29 August 1988 (age 38) Carshalton, London, England
- Height: 1.81 m (5 ft 11 in)
- Weight: 85 kg (187 lb)

Sport
- Sport: Athletics
- Event: Sprinting
- Club: Sutton and District Athletics Club

Achievements and titles
- Personal bests: 100 m: 10.08; 200 m: 20.46
Medal record
Men's Athletics
Representing Great Britain
World Championships
Bronze medal – third place	2009 Berlin	4 × 100 m relay
European Championships
Gold medal – first place	2022 Munich	4 × 100 m relay
Gold medal – first place	2018 Berlin	4 × 100 m relay
Gold medal – first place	2014 Zurich	4 × 100 m relay
Bronze medal – third place	2014 Zurich	100 m
World Relays
Bronze medal – third place	2014 Nassau	4 × 100 m relay
Bronze medal – third place	2019 Yokohama	4 × 100 m relay
Representing England
Commonwealth Games
Gold medal – first place	2022 Birmingham	4 × 100 m relay
Gold medal – first place	2018 Gold Coast	4 × 100 m relay
Silver medal – second place	2014 Glasgow	4 × 100 m relay

Harry Leslie Aikines-Aryeetey (born 29 August 1988) is an English former Commonwealth sprinter and television personality, known for appearing as "Nitro" in the BBC sports endurance competition series Gladiators. He has also taken part in BBC Radio 5's sports quiz Fighting Talk.

In 2005, Aikines-Aryeetey was named as the BBC Young Sports Personality of the Year and the IAAF's Rising Star of the Year after becoming the first athlete to win gold medals at both 100 metres and 200 metres at the World Youth Championships.

An Olympian for Great Britain at the Rio Olympics, Aikines-Aryeetey won his first senior individual medal, a bronze, in the 100 metres at the 2014 European Athletics Championships. At the same championships he earned his first senior title as part of the Great Britain team that won gold in the men's 4 × 100 metres relay. Thereafter, Aikines-Aryeetey won relay gold twice more at European level, and twice at the Commonwealth Games representing England.

== Career ==
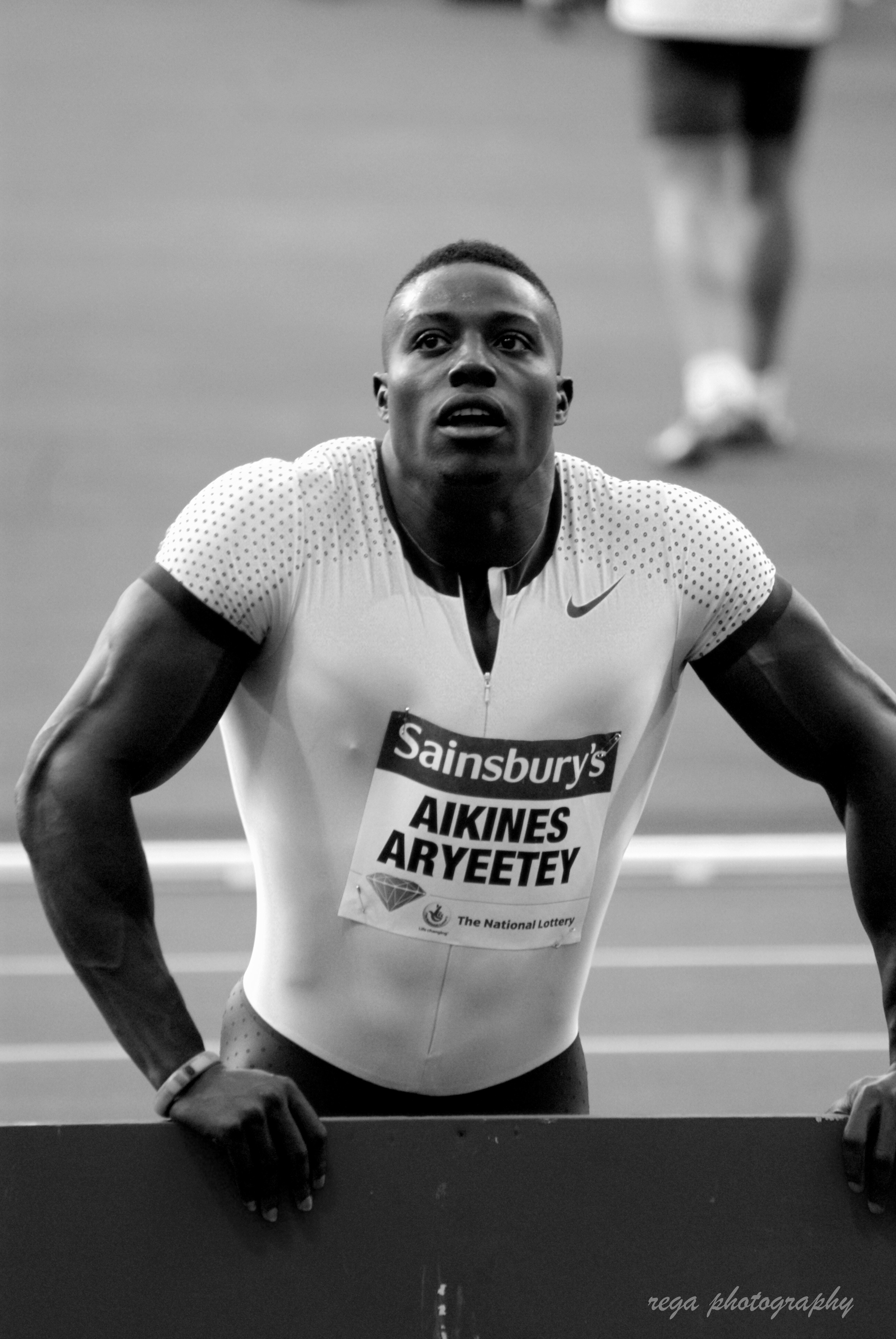
Aryeetey at the Sainsbury's Anniversary Games in July 2013

Aikines-Aryeetey was born on 29 August 1988 in Carshalton, London, to Ghanaian parents. He studied at Greenshaw High School in Sutton, London from 2000 to 2006.

His first major tournament medal came at the 2004 Commonwealth Youth Games where he won the silver medal in the 100 m.

On 11 June 2006, aged 17, he competed in the 100 m at Gateshead in which Asafa Powell equalled the world record of 9.77 s. On 16 August 2006, he won the gold in the 100 m at the 2006 World Junior Championships in Athletics, held in Beijing, China, setting a season's best 10.37 s.

He was advised not to run in 2007 due to minor fractures in the spine that could affect later development. After an eleven-month recuperation period, he returned to action in 2008 with a 60 metres personal best of 6.59 s in France to signal a return to form.

Aikines-Aryeetey was selected for Team GB at the 2009 World Championships in Athletics. As part of the men's 4 × 100 m relay team with Simeon Williamson, Tyrone Edgar and Marlon Devonish, he took bronze in Berlin with a season's best of 38.02 seconds. In 2009 Harry became a Lucozade Sport Ambassador he is also an ambassador for Mirafit.

During the 2010 IAAF World Indoor Championships, Aikines-Aryeetey had to pull out of his semi-final after qualifying third in his first-round heat due to injury. He then returned in August but was not up to full fitness and then took months to regain it for the 2011 season. In the 2011 indoor season, Aikines-Aryeetey returned to some kind of form, finishing second in the UK indoor championships and European Trials. After having qualified, he again was restrained in his heat by injury running 6.94. However, he ran a 200 m personal best of 20.46 in La Chaux-de-Fonds in Switzerland in July. He went on to win the UK championships in Birmingham and qualified for the IAAF World Championships in Daegu with a time of 10.14.

Aikines-Aryeetey won his first senior individual medal in the final of the 2014 European Championships in Zurich where he finished third in a time of 10.22 seconds. In 2018 he was part of the relay team that took gold at both the commonwealth games and also the European championships, his second European gold (after Zurich 2014).

In 2020 he became British champion when winning the 100 metres event at the 2020 British Athletics Championships with a time of 10.35 sec. After sustaining an injury while running in the 2021 European Athletics Indoor Championships Harry was forced to miss the Tokyo Olympics, though 2022 saw his track return, being selected as a member of the 4 × 100 m squad for the 2022 World Championships, the 2022 Commonwealth Games and the 2022 European Championships. Harry regularly trains at Loughborough University.

== Personal bests ==
Event	Best	Location	Date
60 metres	6.55 s	Birmingham, United Kingdom	13 February 2010
100 metres	10.08 s	Birmingham, United Kingdom	13 July 2013
200 metres	20.46 s	La Chaux-de-Fonds, Switzerland	3 July 2011

== Television appearances ==
In March 2021, Aikines-Aryeetey appeared on the MTV series Celebs on the Farm. He finished as the runner-up. In May 2023, he was named as "Nitro", one of the Gladiators in a reboot of the television series of the same name to be broadcast on BBC One. Aikines-Aryeetey's character on the show has become one of the most beloved amongst the fans, and his "explosive energy" and the notorious 41 in (1.0 m) vertical jump are well known amongst the Gladiators community. He was unable to participate in season 2 of the show, due to a knee injury picked up in training. As Nitro, he also appears as the "host" of spin-off series Gladiators: Epic Pranks, which was aired in 2025 on CBBC channel.

Aikines-Aryeetey also appeared as a contestant on Celebrity MasterChef in September 2024, and participated in the Christmas special of Strictly Come Dancing in December 2024, alongside professional dancer Nancy Xu. On 11 August 2025, Aikines-Aryeetey was announced as the first contestant taking part in that year's series of Strictly Come Dancing.
