= Athletics at the 2005 Summer Universiade – Women's 100 metres =

The women's 100 metres event at the 2005 Summer Universiade was held on 15–16 August in İzmir, Turkey.

== Medalists ==
Gold	Silver	Bronze
Olga Khalandyreva; Russia	Ailis McSweeney; Ireland	Nikolett Listár; Hungary

== Results ==
=== Heats ===
Wind:
Heat 1: -1.5 m/s, Heat 2: -0.5 m/s, Heat 3: +1.7 m/s, Heat 4: +0.4 m/s, Heat 5: +1.1 m/s, Heat 6: -0.3 m/s, Heat 7: +0.1 m/s, Heat 8: +0.8 m/s

Rank	Heat	Athlete	Nationality	Time	Notes
1	7	LaVerne Jones-Ferrette	United States Virgin Islands	11.61	Q
2	1	Ailis McSweeney	Ireland	11.67	Q
3	3	Céline Thelamon	France	11.68	Q
4	6	Emily Freeman	Great Britain	11.69	Q
5	2	Olga Khalandyreva	Russia	11.70	Q
6	6	Nongnuch Sanrat	Thailand	11.75	Q
7	3	Laura Turner	Great Britain	11.79	Q
8	1	Yekaterina Butusova	Russia	11.80	Q
9	4	Doris Tomasini	Italy	11.81	Q, SB
10	5	Natacha Vouaux	France	11.82	Q
11	4	Shola Ogundemi	Nigeria	11.87	Q, SB
12	5	Anna Boyle	Ireland	11.88	Q
13	7	Burcu Şentürk	Turkey	11.90	Q
14	5	Nikolett Listár	Hungary	11.91	Q
15	1	Nicole Buchholz	Canada	11.93	Q
15	3	Cindy Stewart	South Africa	11.93	Q
15	4	Edita Kavaliauskienė	Lithuania	11.93	Q
18	1	Élisabeth Davin	Belgium	12.02	q
18	2	Audra Dagelytė	Lithuania	12.02	Q
20	5	Orranut Klomdee	Thailand	12.03	q
21	2	Kerron Stewart	Jamaica	12.04	Q
22	6	Birsen Bekgöz	Turkey	12.13	Q
22	8	Ilze Jordaan	South Africa	12.13	Q
24	2	Alessia Berti	Italy	12.16	q
24	5	Kristina Žumer	Slovenia	12.16	q
26	6	Karlyn Serby	Canada	12.17	q
27	5	Chen Shu-chuan	Chinese Taipei	12.23	q
27	6	Chan Ho Yee	Hong Kong	12.23	q
29	3	Lin Yi-chun	Chinese Taipei	12.25	q
30	4	Marleni Mejía	Dominican Republic	12.29	
31	4	Nana Blakimé	Togo	12.37	
32	8	Millysand de la Paz	Netherlands Antilles	12.53	Q
33	8	Christa Clyde	New Zealand	12.56	Q
34	1	Lai Choi Iok	Macau	12.67	
35	2	Repeka Codrokadroka	Fiji	12.69	
36	7	Maty Salame	Senegal	12.78	Q
37	8	Kirblee Britt	Liberia	12.83	
38	8	Beenish Amin	Pakistan	12.86	
39	2	Leung Shuk Wa	Hong Kong	12.89	
40	1	Lina Bejjani	Lebanon	13.14	
41	3	Bonazgbj Chancelly	Republic of the Congo	13.18	
42	6	Grace Mitambo	Kenya	13.24	
43	7	Jeannette Dicka	Chad	13.27	
44	6	Chan Wai Lan	Macau	13.33	
45	4	Victoria Chipunza	Zimbabwe	13.45	
46	4	Stanislava Nazarova	Azerbaijan	13.52	
47	3	Linda Opiyo	Kenya	13.71	
48	1	Sanele Shongwe	Swaziland	13.99	
49	7	Tracey Ardos	Federated States of Micronesia	14.11	

=== Quarterfinals ===
Wind:
Heat 1: -1.2 m/s, Heat 2: +0.4 m/s, Heat 3: -0.6 m/s, Heat 4: -0.2 m/s

Rank	Heat	Athlete	Nationality	Time	Notes
1	4	LaVerne Jones-Ferrette	United States Virgin Islands	11.51	Q
2	3	Olga Khalandyreva	Russia	11.56	Q
3	1	Ailis McSweeney	Ireland	11.64	Q
4	3	Anna Boyle	Ireland	11.69	Q
5	4	Nongnuch Sanrat	Thailand	11.70	Q
6	4	Nikolett Listár	Hungary	11.73	Q
7	2	Céline Thelamon	France	11.77	Q
7	3	Emily Freeman	Great Britain	11.77	Q
9	2	Kristina Žumer	Slovenia	11.81	Q
9	2	Doris Tomasini	Italy	11.81	Q
11	1	Orranut Klomdee	Thailand	11.82	Q
11	3	Edita Kavaliauskienė	Lithuania	11.82	Q
13	1	Laura Turner	Great Britain	11.83	Q
14	2	Yekaterina Butusova	Russia	11.84	Q
15	2	Burcu Şentürk	Turkey	11.86	
16	4	Élisabeth Davin	Belgium	11.89	Q
17	3	Shola Ogundemi	Nigeria	11.90	
18	1	Nicole Buchholz	Canada	11.91	Q
18	3	Kerron Stewart	Jamaica	11.91	
20	1	Audra Dagelytė	Lithuania	11.95	
21	1	Natacha Vouaux	France	12.01	
22	2	Cindy Stewart	South Africa	12.05	
23	4	Ilze Jordaan	South Africa	12.08	
24	1	Birsen Bekgöz	Turkey	12.13	
25	4	Lin Yi-chun	Chinese Taipei	12.25	
26	1	Chen Shu-chuan	Chinese Taipei	12.45	
27	2	Chan Ho Yee	Hong Kong	12.54	
28	4	Millysand de la Paz	Netherlands Antilles	12.63	
29	8	Christa Clyde	New Zealand	12.70	
30	3	Alessia Berti	Italy	13.47	
	4	Maty Salame	Senegal	DQ	
	3	Karlyn Serby	Canada	DNS	

=== Semifinals ===
Wind:
Heat 1: +0.6 m/s, Heat 2: +0.5 m/s

Rank	Heat	Athlete	Nationality	Time	Notes
1	2	Ailis McSweeney	Ireland	11.65	Q
2	2	Olga Khalandyreva	Russia	11.69	Q
3	2	Emily Freeman	Great Britain	11.73	Q
4	1	Céline Thelamon	France	11.75	Q
5	1	Anna Boyle	Ireland	11.75	Q
6	1	Nikolett Listár	Hungary	11.80	Q
7	1	Laura Turner	Great Britain	11.81	Q
8	2	Nongnuch Sanrat	Thailand	11.87	Q
9	2	Kristina Žumer	Slovenia	11.89	
10	1	LaVerne Jones-Ferrette	United States Virgin Islands	11.92	
11	2	Doris Tomasini	Italy	11.94	
12	1	Orranut Klomdee	Thailand	11.95	
13	1	Edita Kavaliauskienė	Lithuania	11.98	
14	2	Élisabeth Davin	Belgium	12.00	
15	1	Yekaterina Butusova	Russia	12.05	
16	2	Nicole Buchholz	Canada	12.17	

=== Final ===
Wind: +1.1 m/s

Rank	Athlete	Nationality	Time	Notes
1st place, gold medalist(s)	Olga Khalandyreva	Russia	11.64	
2nd place, silver medalist(s)	Ailis McSweeney	Ireland	11.68	
3rd place, bronze medalist(s)	Nikolett Listár	Hungary	11.71	PB
4	Céline Thelamon	France	11.72	
5	Laura Turner	Great Britain	11.73	
6	Anna Boyle	Ireland	11.77	
7	Nongnuch Sanrat	Thailand	11.79	
8	Emily Freeman	Great Britain	11.90	
