= 2005 European Athletics U23 Championships – Women's 100 metres =

The women's 100 metres event at the 2005 European Athletics U23 Championships was held in Erfurt, Germany, at Steigerwaldstadion on 14 and 16 July.

== Medalists ==
Gold	Maria Karastamati; Greece
Silver	Lina Jacques-Sébastien; France
Bronze	Verena Sailer; Germany

== Results ==
=== Final ===
16 July
Wind: 1.5m/s

Rank	Name	Nationality	Time	Notes
1st place, gold medalist(s)	Maria Karastamati	Greece	11.03	CR
2nd place, silver medalist(s)	Lina Jacques-Sébastien	France	11.46	
3rd place, bronze medalist(s)	Verena Sailer	Germany	11.53	
4	Yekaterina Butusova	Russia	11.54	
5	Anna Boyle	Ireland	11.57	
5	Fabienne Weyermann	Switzerland	11.57	
7	Natacha Vouaux	France	11.64	
	Jeanette Kwakye	Great Britain	DNS	

=== Heats ===
14 July
Qualified: first 2 in each heat and 2 best to the Final

==== Heat 1 ====
Wind: -1.3m/s

Rank	Name	Nationality	Time	Notes
1	Anna Boyle	Ireland	11.77	Q
2	Verena Sailer	Germany	11.77	Q
3	Yekaterina Butusova	Russia	11.77	q
4	Ayodelé Ikuesan	France	11.86	
5	Katrin Käärt	Estonia	11.86	
6	Monika Ivanova	Bulgaria	11.90	
7	Nastassia Shuliak	Belarus	12.10	

==== Heat 2 ====
Wind: -1.2m/s

Rank	Name	Nationality	Time	Notes
1	Maria Karastamati	Greece	11.29	Q
2	Jeanette Kwakye	Great Britain	11.66	Q
3	Natacha Vouaux	France	11.77	q
4	Nikolett Listár	Hungary	11.82	
5	Sari Keskitalo	Finland	11.94	
6	Anne Möllinger	Germany	12.03	
7	Jennifer Schneeberger	Austria	12.20	

==== Heat 3 ====
Wind: -1.7m/s

Rank	Name	Nationality	Time	Notes
1	Lina Jacques-Sébastien	France	11.77	Q
2	Fabienne Weyermann	Switzerland	11.90	Q
3	Ailis McSweeney	Ireland	11.93	
4	Diana Tudorache	Romania	11.98	
5	Burcu Şentürk	Turkey	12.16	

== Participation ==
According to an unofficial count, 19 athletes from 15 countries participated in the event.

- Austria (1)
- Belarus (1)
- Bulgaria (1)
- Estonia (1)
- Finland (1)
- France (3)
- Germany (2)
- Great Britain (1)
- Greece (1)
- Hungary (1)
- Ireland (2)
- Romania (1)
- Russia (1)
- Switzerland (1)
- Turkey (1)
