= Athletics at the 2005 Summer Universiade – Women's 200 metres =

The women's 200 metres event at the 2005 Summer Universiade was held on 17–18 August in İzmir, Turkey.

== Medalists ==
Gold	Silver	Bronze
Natalya Ivanova; Russia	Yelena Yakovleva; Russia	Elodie Ouédraogo; Belgium

== Results ==
=== Heats ===
Wind:
Heat 1: -0.5 m/s, Heat 2: +2.6 m/s, Heat 3: +0.6 m/s, Heat 4: -1.7 m/s, Heat 5: -0.1 m/s, Heat 6: +0.8 m/s, Heat 7: +1.7 m/s

Rank	Heat	Athlete	Nationality	Time	Notes
1	7	Nataliya Pyhyda	Ukraine	23.64	Q
2	6	Yelena Yakovleva	Russia	23.68	Q
3	3	Kim Wall	Great Britain	23.87	Q
4	2	Natalya Ivanova	Russia	23.94	Q
5	3	Grażyna Prokopek	Poland	23.98	Q
6	7	Elodie Ouédraogo	Belgium	23.99	Q
7	7	Raquel da Costa	Brazil	24.05	Q
8	3	Adrienne Power	Canada	24.08	Q
9	4	Alena Neumiarzhitskaya	Belarus	24.09	Q
10	5	LaVerne Jones-Ferrette	United States Virgin Islands	24.12	Q
11	1	Emily Maher	Ireland	24.19	Q
12	6	Juthamas Thavoncharoen	Thailand	24.21	Q
13	1	Monika Bejnar	Poland	24.22	Q
14	6	Burcu Şentürk	Turkey	24.28	Q
14	7	Yuangjan Panthakarn	Thailand	24.28	Q, PB
16	5	Ruth Grajeda	Mexico	24.33	Q
17	3	Nikolett Listár	Hungary	24.34	Q
18	4	Edita Kavaliauskienė	Lithuania	24.37	Q
19	4	Cindy Stewart	South Africa	24.45	Q
20	5	Doris Tomasini	Italy	24.48	Q
21	5	Kristina Žumer	Slovenia	24.51	Q
22	5	Birsen Bekgöz	Turkey	24.51	q
23	6	Lorena de Oliveira	Brazil	24.53	Q
24	7	Shola Ogundemi	Nigeria	24.57	q
25	4	Kerron Stewart	Jamaica	24.59	Q
26	7	Katsiaryna Bobryk	Belarus	24.60	q
27	1	Audra Dagelytė	Lithuania	24.62	Q
28	6	Alessia Berti	Italy	24.65	q
29	1	Violeta Kiskinova	Bulgaria	24.74	Q
30	2	Fiona O'Friel	Ireland	24.88	Q
31	3	Justine Bayiga	Uganda	24.99	
32	5	Vaya Vladeva	Bulgaria	25.17	
33	2	Ilze Jordaan	South Africa	25.27	Q
34	6	Chen Shu-chuan	Chinese Taipei	25.34	
35	5	Chan Ho Yee	Hong Kong	25.42	
36	4	Sarah Nambawa	Uganda	25.66	
37	4	Lin Yi-chun	Chinese Taipei	25.69	
38	6	Melissa Moraga	Costa Rica	26.01	
39	2	Marleni Mejía	Dominican Republic	26.14	Q
40	2	Millysand de la Paz	Netherlands Antilles	26.48	
41	6	Kirblee Britt	Liberia	26.60	
42	5	Lai Choi Iok	Macau	26.63	
43	3	Bonazgbj Chancelly	Republic of the Congo	26.73	
44	7	Grace Mitambo	Kenya	27.12	
45	3	Jeannette Dicka	Chad	27.14	
46	4	Hoi Wai Kuan	Macau	27.31	
47	1	Sanele Shongwe	Swaziland	27.42	
48	2	Victoria Chipunza	Zimbabwe	27.83	
49	2	Linda Opiyo	Kenya	28.04	

=== Quarterfinals ===
Wind:
Heat 1: -0.2 m/s, Heat 2: +0.5 m/s, Heat 3: +0.8 m/s, Heat 4: -0.1 m/s

Rank	Heat	Athlete	Nationality	Time	Notes
1	2	Natalya Ivanova	Russia	23.31	Q
2	4	Yelena Yakovleva	Russia	23.34	Q
3	1	LaVerne Jones-Ferrette	United States Virgin Islands	23.41	Q
4	1	Monika Bejnar	Poland	23.48	Q
5	3	Elodie Ouédraogo	Belgium	23.60	Q
6	3	Grażyna Prokopek	Poland	23.63	Q
7	3	Adrienne Power	Canada	23.66	Q
8	3	Nataliya Pyhyda	Ukraine	23.69	Q
9	1	Kim Wall	Great Britain	23.75	Q
9	4	Nikolett Listár	Hungary	23.75	Q
11	4	Emily Maher	Ireland	23.76	Q
12	2	Alena Neumiarzhitskaya	Belarus	23.79	Q
13	2	Ruth Grajeda	Mexico	23.95	Q
13	4	Raquel da Costa	Brazil	23.95	Q
15	2	Edita Kavaliauskienė	Lithuania	23.96	Q
16	1	Doris Tomasini	Italy	24.11	Q, SB
17	3	Kristina Žumer	Slovenia	24.22	
18	4	Burcu Şentürk	Turkey	24.25	
19	4	Kerron Stewart	Jamaica	24.26	
20	1	Audra Dagelytė	Lithuania	24.29	
21	3	Cindy Stewart	South Africa	24.34	
22	1	Violeta Kiskinova	Bulgaria	24.49	
23	1	Katsiaryna Bobryk	Belarus	24.55	
24	1	Fiona O'Friel	Ireland	24.55	
25	2	Shola Ogundemi	Nigeria	24.63	
26	2	Ilze Jordaan	South Africa	24.74	
27	3	Lorena de Oliveira	Brazil	24.82	
28	3	Birsen Bekgöz	Turkey	24.83	
29	4	Alessia Berti	Italy	24.84	
30	2	Yuangjan Panthakarn	Thailand	25.09	
31	2	Marleni Mejía	Dominican Republic	25.46	
	4	Juthamas Thavoncharoen	Thailand	DQ	

=== Semifinals ===
Wind:
Heat 1: +0.2 m/s, Heat 2: +0.7 m/s

Rank	Heat	Athlete	Nationality	Time	Notes
1	1	Natalya Ivanova	Russia	23.11	Q
2	1	Elodie Ouédraogo	Belgium	23.23	Q
3	2	Yelena Yakovleva	Russia	23.37	Q
4	1	Monika Bejnar	Poland	23.39	Q, SB
5	1	Nataliya Pyhyda	Ukraine	23.40	Q, SB
6	2	LaVerne Jones-Ferrette	United States Virgin Islands	23.49	Q
7	1	Alena Neumiarzhitskaya	Belarus	23.52	
8	1	Adrienne Power	Canada	23.62	
9	2	Grażyna Prokopek	Poland	23.69	Q
10	2	Nikolett Listár	Hungary	23.87	Q
11	2	Emily Maher	Ireland	23.89	
12	1	Ruth Grajeda	Mexico	23.96	
13	2	Edita Kavaliauskienė	Lithuania	24.09	
14	2	Raquel da Costa	Brazil	24.18	
15	2	Kim Wall	Great Britain	24.31	
16	1	Doris Tomasini	Italy	24.40	

=== Final ===
Wind: -1.0 m/s

Rank	Athlete	Nationality	Time	Notes
1st place, gold medalist(s)	Natalya Ivanova	Russia	23.28	
2nd place, silver medalist(s)	Yelena Yakovleva	Russia	23.45	
3rd place, bronze medalist(s)	Elodie Ouédraogo	Belgium	23.62	
4	Nataliya Pyhyda	Ukraine	23.72	
5	Monika Bejnar	Poland	23.75	
6	Grażyna Prokopek	Poland	23.79	
7	LaVerne Jones-Ferrette	United States Virgin Islands	24.00	
8	Nikolett Listár	Hungary	24.08	
