= 2002 World Junior Championships in Athletics – Women's 100 metres =

The women's 100 metres event at the 2002 World Junior Championships in Athletics was held in Kingston, Jamaica, at National Stadium on 16 and 17 July.

== Medalists ==
Gold	Lauryn Williams; United States
Silver	Simone Facey; Jamaica
Bronze	Marshevet Hooker; United States

== Results ==
=== Final ===
17 July
Wind: -0.2 m/s

Rank	Name	Nationality	Time	Notes
1st place, gold medalist(s)	Lauryn Williams	United States	11.33	
2nd place, silver medalist(s)	Simone Facey	Jamaica	11.43	
3rd place, bronze medalist(s)	Marshevet Hooker	United States	11.48	
4	Kerron Stewart	Jamaica	11.53	
5	Thatiana Ignâcio	Brazil	11.79	
6	Ann Cathrine Bakken	Norway	11.84	
7	Krysia Bayley	Canada	11.85	
8	Wanda Hutson	Trinidad and Tobago	11.87	

=== Semifinals ===
17 July

==== Semifinal 1 ====
Wind: +0.3 m/s

Rank	Name	Nationality	Time	Notes
1	Lauryn Williams	United States	11.46	Q
2	Thatiana Ignâcio	Brazil	11.73	Q
3	Jeanette Kwakye	United Kingdom	11.75	
4	Margarita Anisimova	Russia	11.79	
5	Kerri-Ann Mitchell	Canada	11.95	
6	Nikolett Listár	Hungary	11.98	
7	Sandra Gomis	France	12.00	
8	Sille Søndergaard	Denmark	12.51	

==== Semifinal 2 ====
Wind: +0.7 m/s

Rank	Name	Nationality	Time	Notes
1	Marshevet Hooker	United States	11.43	Q
2	Simone Facey	Jamaica	11.44	Q
3	Krysia Bayley	Canada	11.64	q
4	Ivet Lalova	Bulgaria	11.83	
5	Katrin Käärt	Estonia	11.90	
6	Virgil Hodge	Saint Kitts and Nevis	11.94	
7	Kelly-Ann Baptiste	Trinidad and Tobago	12.03	
8	Mae Koime	Papua New Guinea	12.17	

==== Semifinal 3 ====
Wind: +0.9 m/s

Rank	Name	Nationality	Time	Notes
1	Kerron Stewart	Jamaica	11.46	Q
2	Ann Cathrine Bakken	Norway	11.64	Q
3	Wanda Hutson	Trinidad and Tobago	11.72	q
4	Iuliana Belcheva	Bulgaria	11.77	
5	Siina Pylkkä	Finland	11.92	
6	Joan van den Akker	Netherlands	11.96	
7	Delphine Atangana	Cameroon	12.28	
8	Olga Fyodorova	Russia	20.01	

=== Heats ===
16 July

==== Heat 1 ====
Wind: -0.4 m/s

Rank	Name	Nationality	Time	Notes
1	Marshevet Hooker	United States	11.65	Q
2	Iuliana Belcheva	Bulgaria	11.81	Q
3	Joan van den Akker	Netherlands	12.04	Q
4	Mae Koime	Papua New Guinea	12.29	Q
5	Sille Søndergaard	Denmark	12.35	Q
6	Gloria Diogo	São Tomé and Príncipe	12.46	

==== Heat 2 ====
Wind: -2.9 m/s

Rank	Name	Nationality	Time	Notes
1	Lauryn Williams	United States	11.69	Q
2	Kerron Stewart	Jamaica	11.81	Q
3	Kerri-Ann Mitchell	Canada	11.91	Q
4	Ivet Lalova	Bulgaria	11.97	Q
5	Wanda Hutson	Trinidad and Tobago	12.00	Q
6	Sandra Gomis	France	12.17	q
7	Losalini Tadulala	Fiji	12.69	

==== Heat 3 ====
Wind: -0.6 m/s

Rank	Name	Nationality	Time	Notes
1	Olga Fyodorova	Russia	11.51	Q
2	Krysia Bayley	Canada	11.67	Q
3	Simone Facey	Jamaica	11.68	Q
4	Ann Cathrine Bakken	Norway	11.74	Q
5	Jeanette Kwakye	United Kingdom	11.76	Q
6	Katrin Käärt	Estonia	11.95	q
7	Delphine Atangana	Cameroon	12.26	q

==== Heat 4 ====
Wind: +1.3 m/s

Rank	Name	Nationality	Time	Notes
1	Thatiana Ignâcio	Brazil	11.61	Q
2	Margarita Anisimova	Russia	11.71	Q
3	Virgil Hodge	Saint Kitts and Nevis	11.80	Q
4	Nikolett Listár	Hungary	11.80	Q
5	Siina Pylkkä	Finland	11.82	Q
6	Kelly-Ann Baptiste	Trinidad and Tobago	11.84	q
7	Aseel Danan	Jordan	13.09	

== Participation ==
According to an unofficial count, 27 athletes from 21 countries participated in the event.

- Brazil (1)
- Bulgaria (2)
- Cameroon (1)
- Canada (2)
- Denmark (1)
- Estonia (1)
- Fiji (1)
- Finland (1)
- France (1)
- Hungary (1)
- Jamaica (2)
- Jordan (1)
- Netherlands (1)
- Norway (1)
- Papua New Guinea (1)
- Russia (2)
- Saint Kitts and Nevis (1)
- São Tomé and Príncipe (1)
- Trinidad and Tobago (2)
- United Kingdom (1)
- United States (2)
