= 2002 World Junior Championships in Athletics – Women's 200 metres =

The women's 200 metres event at the 2002 World Junior Championships in Athletics was held in Kingston, Jamaica, at National Stadium on 18 and 19 July.

== Medalists ==
Gold	Vernicha James; United Kingdom
Silver	Anneisha McLaughlin; Jamaica
Bronze	Sanya Richards; United States

== Results ==
=== Final ===
19 July
Wind: -0.2 m/s

Rank	Name	Nationality	Time	Notes
1st place, gold medalist(s)	Vernicha James	United Kingdom	22.93	
2nd place, silver medalist(s)	Anneisha McLaughlin	Jamaica	22.94	
3rd place, bronze medalist(s)	Sanya Richards	United States	23.09	
4	Vincenza Calì	Italy	23.25	
5	Allyson Felix	United States	23.48	
6	Nickesha Anderson	Jamaica	23.59	
7	Amy Spencer	United Kingdom	23.76	
8	Ashley Purnell	Canada	23.97	

=== Semifinals ===
19 July

==== Semifinal 1 ====
Wind: +0.4 m/s

Rank	Name	Nationality	Time	Notes
1	Sanya Richards	United States	23.33	Q
2	Nickesha Anderson	Jamaica	23.52	Q
3	Ashley Purnell	Canada	23.80	q
4	Nikolett Listár	Hungary	24.10	
5	Yuliya Gushchina	Russia	24.12	
6	Tiandra Ponteen	Saint Kitts and Nevis	24.67	
7	Claire Bergin	Ireland	24.97	
8	Virginie Michanol	France	25.35	

==== Semifinal 2 ====
Wind: -0.1 m/s

Rank	Name	Nationality	Time	Notes
1	Vernicha James	United Kingdom	23.07	Q
2	Allyson Felix	United States	23.73	Q
3	April Brough	New Zealand	24.09	
4	Johanna Kedzierski	Germany	24.31	
5	Petya Borisova	Bulgaria	24.48	
6	Phara Anacharsis	France	24.68	
7	Elina Korjansalo	Finland	24.97	
	Lyn-Marie Cox	Barbados	DNS	

==== Semifinal 3 ====
Wind: -0.3 m/s

Rank	Name	Nationality	Time	Notes
1	Anneisha McLaughlin	Jamaica	23.39	Q
2	Vincenza Calì	Italy	23.42	Q
3	Amy Spencer	United Kingdom	23.65	q
4	Iuliana Belcheva	Bulgaria	24.15	
5	Ann Cathrine Bakken	Norway	24.28	
6	Carla Bosco	Finland	24.29	
7	Janina Schwidde	Germany	24.67	
8	Jenny Ljunggren	Sweden	24.74	

=== Heats ===
18 July

==== Heat 1 ====
Wind: +1.6 m/s

Rank	Name	Nationality	Time	Notes
1	Vincenza Calì	Italy	23.27	Q
2	Nickesha Anderson	Jamaica	23.34	Q
3	Yuliya Gushchina	Russia	23.98	Q
4	Phara Anacharsis	France	24.14	Q
5	Jenny Ljunggren	Sweden	24.30	q
6	Megan Clarke	Canada	24.69	
7	Gabriela Patterson	Costa Rica	24.69	
8	Imma Sabate	Andorra	28.02	

==== Heat 2 ====
Wind: +1.5 m/s

Rank	Name	Nationality	Time	Notes
1	Sanya Richards	United States	23.13	Q
2	Ashley Purnell	Canada	23.28	Q
3	Ann Cathrine Bakken	Norway	24.20	Q
4	Elina Korjansalo	Finland	24.77	Q
5	Delphine Atangana	Cameroon	24.96	
6	Rina Fujimaki	Japan	25.03	
	Virgil Hodge	Saint Kitts and Nevis	DQ	

==== Heat 3 ====
Wind: +1.4 m/s

Rank	Name	Nationality	Time	Notes
1	Vernicha James	United Kingdom	23.14	Q
2	Iuliana Belcheva	Bulgaria	24.12	Q
3	Johanna Kedzierski	Germany	24.16	Q
4	Tiandra Ponteen	Saint Kitts and Nevis	24.29	Q
5	Virginie Michanol	France	24.49	q
6	Daniela Riderelli	Chile	24.69	
	Josephine Ngaluafe	Australia	DNF	

==== Heat 4 ====
Wind: +2.0 m/s

Rank	Name	Nationality	Time	Notes
1	Allyson Felix	United States	23.77	Q
2	April Brough	New Zealand	23.94	Q
3	Nikolett Listár	Hungary	24.08	Q
4	Claire Bergin	Ireland	24.36	Q
5	Gayane Beglaryan	Uzbekistan	25.11	
	Katrin Käärt	Estonia	DNF	

==== Heat 5 ====
Wind: +1.6 m/s

Rank	Name	Nationality	Time	Notes
1	Anneisha McLaughlin	Jamaica	23.30	Q
2	Amy Spencer	United Kingdom	23.46	Q
3	Lyn-Marie Cox	Barbados	23.86	Q
4	Carla Bosco	Finland	24.11	Q
5	Janina Schwidde	Germany	24.37	q
6	Petya Borisova	Bulgaria	24.61	q
7	Joan van den Akker	Netherlands	25.06	

== Participation ==
According to an unofficial count, 35 athletes from 26 countries participated in the event.

- Andorra (1)
- Australia (1)
- Barbados (1)
- Bulgaria (2)
- Cameroon (1)
- Canada (2)
- Chile (1)
- Costa Rica (1)
- Estonia (1)
- Finland (2)
- France (2)
- Germany (2)
- Hungary (1)
- Ireland (1)
- Italy (1)
- Jamaica (2)
- Japan (1)
- Netherlands (1)
- New Zealand (1)
- Norway (1)
- Russia (1)
- Saint Kitts and Nevis (2)
- Sweden (1)
- United Kingdom (2)
- United States (2)
- Uzbekistan (1)
