= 2009 World Championships in Athletics – Women's 200 metres =

The women's 200 metres at the 2009 World Championships in Athletics was held at the Olympic Stadium on 19, 20 and 21 August.

Olympic silver medalist and defending World champion Allyson Felix (USA) established herself as the pre-race favorite, having run under 22 seconds earlier in the season. Double Olympic champion Veronica Campbell-Brown (JAM) suffered a toe injury and entered Berlin below her peak form.

In the final, Campbell-Brown and Allyson Felix both went out of the blocks quickly and entered the home straight even with one another. Felix, however, was able to hold her form as Campbell-Brown faltered, crossing the line in 22.02 seconds to win her third World 200m title. Campbell-Brown earned another silver medal in the 200m, and Debbie Ferguson-McKenzie (BAH) won the bronze medal.

== Medalists ==
Gold	Silver	Bronze
Allyson Felix; United States	Veronica Campbell-Brown; Jamaica	Debbie Ferguson-McKenzie; Bahamas

== Records ==
World Record	Florence Griffith-Joyner (USA)	21.34	Seoul, South Korea	29 September 1988
Championship Record	Silke Gladisch-Möller (GDR)	21.74	Rome, Italy	3 September 1987
World Leading	Allyson Felix (USA)	21.88	Stockholm, Sweden	31 July 2009
African Record	Mary Onyali-Omagbemi (NGR)	22.07	Zürich, Switzerland	14 August 1996
Asian Record	Li Xuemei (CHN)	22.01	Shanghai, China	22 October 1997
North American record	Florence Griffith-Joyner (USA)	21.34	Seoul, South Korea	29 September 1988
South American record	Lucimar de Moura (BRA)	22.60	Bogotá, Colombia	26 June 1999
European Record	Marita Koch (GDR)	21.71	Karl-Marx-Stadt, East Germany	10 June 1979
Oceanian Record	Melinda Gainsford-Taylor (AUS)	22.23	Stuttgart, Germany	13 July 1997

== Qualification standards ==
A time	B time
23.00	23.30

== Schedule ==
Date	Time	Round
August 19, 2009	19:45	Heats
August 20, 2009	19:50	Semifinals
August 21, 2009	21:00	Final

== Results ==
=== Heats ===
Qualification: First 3 in each heat (Q) and the next 6 fastest (q) advance to the semifinals.

Rank	Heat	Name	Nationality	Time	Notes
1	4	Marshevet Hooker	United States	22.51	Q, SB
2	5	Cydonie Mothersille	Cayman Islands	22.69	Q
3	4	Debbie Ferguson-McKenzie	Bahamas	22.71	Q
4	2	Muna Lee	United States	22.76	Q, SB
5	1	Simone Facey	Jamaica	22.83	Q
5	4	Eleni Artymata	Cyprus	22.83	Q, NR
7	3	Allyson Felix	United States	22.88	Q
8	5	Anneisha McLaughlin	Jamaica	22.91	Q, PB
9	3	Monique Williams	New Zealand	22.96	Q, NR
10	5	LaVerne Jones-Ferrette	U.S. Virgin Islands	22.97	Q
11	2	Kelly-Ann Baptiste	Trinidad and Tobago	23.00	Q
12	6	Veronica Campbell-Brown	Jamaica	23.01	Q
13	4	Yelena Bolsun	Russia	23.06	q
14	2	Yuliya Gushchina	Russia	23.07	Q
15	1	Charonda Williams	United States	23.08	Q
16	6	Emily Freeman	Great Britain & N.I.	23.10	Q
17	6	Olivia Borlée	Belgium	23.25	Q
18	3	Tameka Williams	Saint Kitts and Nevis	23.27	Q, SB
19	3	Olga Zaytseva	Russia	23.28	q
20	1	Johanna Danois	France	23.29	Q
21	5	Vida Anim	Ghana	23.33	q
22	2	Virgil Hodge	Saint Kitts and Nevis	23.34	q
22	3	Roqaya Al-Gassra	Bahrain	23.34	q, SB
24	6	Sheniqua Ferguson	Bahamas	23.35	q, SB
25	3	Adrienne Power	Canada	23.38	
26	1	Chisato Fukushima	Japan	23.40	
27	1	Darlenis Obregón	Colombia	23.42	
27	1	Andreea Ograzeanu	Romania	23.42	
29	2	Carol Rodríguez	Puerto Rico	23.54	
30	4	Alena Kievich	Belarus	23.59	
31	4	Ivet Lalova	Bulgaria	23.60	SB
32	3	Momoko Takahashi	Japan	23.61	
32	5	Isabel Le Roux	South Africa	23.61	
34	6	Guzel Khubbieva	Uzbekistan	23.61	SB
35	4	Meritzer Williams	Saint Kitts and Nevis	23.72	
36	2	Sabina Veit	Slovenia	23.77	
37	6	Jade Bailey	Barbados	23.84	
38	5	Makelesi Batimala	Fiji	24.13	SB
39	5	Oludamola Osayomi	Nigeria	24.24	
40	2	Sunayna Wahi	Suriname	24.74	PB
41	1	Nomvula Dlamini	Swaziland	25.70	PB
42	2	Saria Traboulsi	Lebanon	26.90	
43	3	Selloane Tsoaeli	Lesotho	28.34	
	1	Munira Saleh	Syria	DNF	
	6	Elizaveta Bryzhina	Ukraine	DNS	

Key: PB = Personal best, Q = qualification by place in heat, q = qualification by overall place, SB = Seasonal best

=== Semifinals ===
Qualification: First 2 in each semifinal (Q) and the next 2 fastest (q) advance to the final.

Rank	Heat	Name	Nationality	Time	Notes
1	1	Debbie Ferguson-McKenzie	Bahamas	22.24	Q
2	1	Veronica Campbell-Brown	Jamaica	22.29	Q, SB
3	3	Muna Lee	United States	22.30	Q, SB
4	2	Allyson Felix	United States	22.44	Q
5	2	Anneisha McLaughlin	Jamaica	22.55	Q, PB
6	3	Simone Facey	Jamaica	22.58	Q, SB
7	1	Emily Freeman	Great Britain & N.I.	22.64	q, PB
8	1	Eleni Artymata	Cyprus	22.64	q, NR
9	2	LaVerne Jones-Ferrette	U.S. Virgin Islands	22.74	
10	2	Cydonie Mothersille	Cayman Islands	22.80	
11	2	Charonda Williams	United States	22.81	
12	3	Monique Williams	New Zealand	22.90	NR
13	3	Kelly-Ann Baptiste	Trinidad and Tobago	22.96	
14	1	Johanna Danois	France	23.03	PB
15	2	Olga Zaytseva	Russia	23.19	
16	3	Virgil Hodge	Saint Kitts and Nevis	23.19	SB
17	3	Yuliya Gushchina	Russia	23.24	
18	1	Roqaya Al-Gassra	Bahrain	23.26	SB
19	1	Yelena Bolsun	Russia	23.27	
20	3	Vida Anim	Ghana	23.36	
21	2	Sheniqua Ferguson	Bahamas	23.40	
22	3	Olivia Borlée	Belgium	23.42	
23	2	Tameka Williams	Saint Kitts and Nevis	23.47	
	1	Marshevet Hooker	United States	DNF	

=== Final ===
Rank	Name	Nationality	Time	Notes
1st place, gold medalist(s)	Allyson Felix	United States	22.02	
2nd place, silver medalist(s)	Veronica Campbell-Brown	Jamaica	22.35	
3rd place, bronze medalist(s)	Debbie Ferguson-McKenzie	Bahamas	22.41	
4	Muna Lee	United States	22.48	
5	Anneisha McLaughlin	Jamaica	22.62	
6	Simone Facey	Jamaica	22.80	
7	Emily Freeman	Great Britain & N.I.	22.98	
8	Eleni Artymata	Cyprus	23.05	
