= Jeanette Kwakye =

British sprinter (born 1983)

Jeanette Kwakye MBE
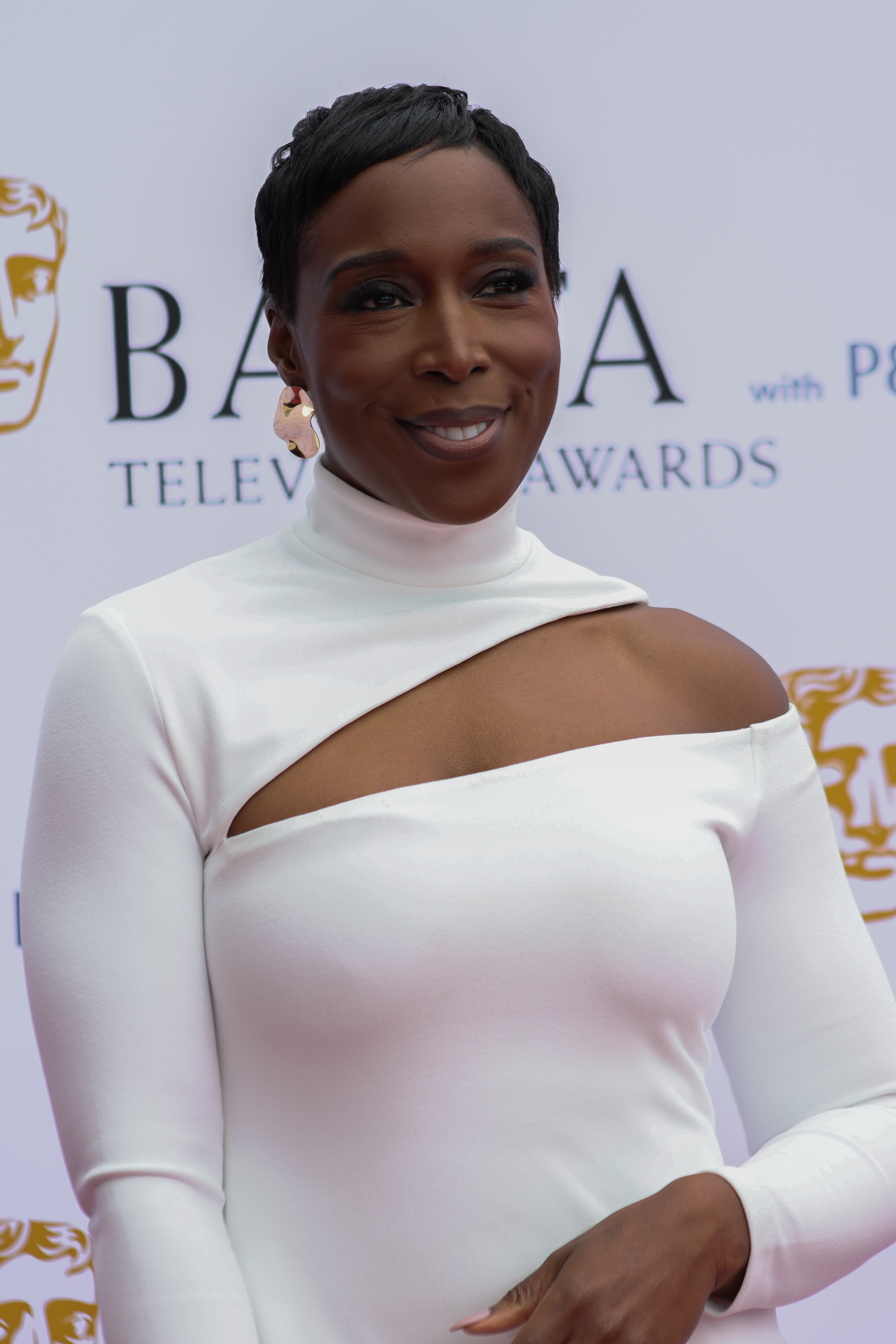
- Kwakye at the 2026 British Academy Television Awards

Personal information
- Born: 20 March 1983 (age 43) London Borough of Waltham Forest, England
- Height: 5 ft 3 in (1.60 m)
- Weight: 61 kg (134 lb)

Sport
- Country: (United Kingdom) Great Britain
- Club: Woodford Green with Essex Ladies
- Turned pro: 2005
- Retired: 2014

Achievements and titles
- Olympic finals: 2008 – 6th
- World finals: 2008 Indoor – 2nd
- Highest world ranking: 60 m: 2 (2008); 100 m: 9 (2008); 200 m: 45 (2007)
- Personal bests: 60 m 7.08; 100 m 11.14; 200 m 23.11
Medal record
Representing Great Britain
Women's athletics
World Indoor Championships
Silver medal – second place	2008 Valencia	60 m
- Updated on 17 August 2008

Jeanette Boahemaa Kwakye (/ˈkwɑːtʃi/ KWAH-chee; born 20 March 1983) is a British broadcaster and retired sprinter.

== Athletics career ==
Kwakye won a bronze medal in the 4×100 metres relay at the 2002 World Junior Championships, with teammates Jade Lucas-Read, Amy Spencer and Vernicha James. At the 2007 European Indoor Championships she finished fourth in the 60 metres. In the semi-final she recorded a time of 7.17 seconds, this being the fastest time by a British woman in the 60m since 1986.

Kwakye, became the 2007 British Champion over 100m in a time of 11.59, beating Laura Turner (who recorded the same time) and defending champion Joice Maduaka. The next day, she also won the 200m title, after beating Emily Freeman and Donna Fraser, who took silver and bronze, respectively.

In the 2008 IAAF World Indoor Championships in Valencia, Kwakye equalled the British 60m record of 7.13 by Beverly Kinch in her semi-final before breaking it with a 7.08 run to claim silver behind American Angela Williams who won in 7.06, this placing Kwakye as number 2 in the 2008 world female rankings.

On 12 July 2008, Kwakye defended her British 100m title, whilst also winning the Olympic trials, and was accordingly automatically selected to compete at the 2008 Summer Olympics. Her time of 11.26 equalled her then lifetime best.

Representing Great Britain
Year	Competition	Venue	Position	Event	Time
2012	European Athletics Championships	Helsinki, Finland	29th	100 m	11.98
2011	World Championships	Daegu, South Korea	13th	100 m	11.48
2011	World Championships	Daegu, South Korea	12th	4 × 100 metres relay	43.95
2008	Olympic Games	Beijing, China	6th	100 m	11.14
2008	Olympic Games	Beijing, China	8th	4 × 100 metres relay	DNF
2008	World Indoor Championships	Valencia, Spain	2nd	60 m	7.08
2007	World Championships	Osaka, Japan	22nd	100 m	11.40
2007	European Indoor Championships	Birmingham, England	4th	60 m	7.20
2005	European Athletics U23 Championships	Erfurt, Germany	8th	100 m	DNS
2005	European Athletics Indoor Championships	Madrid, Spain	13th	60 m	7.34
2003	Summer Universiade	Daegu, South Korea	11th	100 m	11.85
2003	European Athletics U23 Championships	Bydgoszcz, Poland	7th	100 m	11.62
2003	European Athletics U23 Championships	Bydgoszcz, Poland	6th	4 x 100 meters relay	44.87
2002	World Junior Championships	Kingston, Jamaica	9th	100 m	11.75
2002	World Junior Championships	Kingston, Jamaica	3rd	4 × 100 metres relay	44.22

=== 2008 Summer Olympics ===
In the heats of the 100 metres, Kwakye finished in second place behind Torri Edwards, clocking a time of 11.30 seconds, allowing her to progress through to the quarter-final stage. In the quarter-final, she was beaten to the line by Shelly-Ann Fraser and Yevgeniya Polyakova, but still qualified for the semi-final by finishing in third place. In the semi-final on 17 August 2008, Kwakye finished third, with a time of 11.19. She became the first British woman to reach the 100 metres final since Heather Oakes in 1984. At these Olympics, Kwakye was also the only European athlete to appear in the final. In the final, she clocked 11.14, a personal best, to finish in sixth place, ahead of Debbie Ferguson-McKenzie of the Bahamas and Torri Edwards of the United States.

Great Britain reached the final of the 4×100 metres relay, and along with the Jamaican team, were favourites to claim a medal. Kwakye ran a good first bend in the final, but the British team failed to finish due to a mix-up in the changeover between Montell Douglas and Emily Freeman. Jamaica also failed to finish after a similar error between Sherone Simpson and Kerron Stewart.

=== Injuries, return to competition and retirement ===
After the 2008 Summer Olympics, Kwakye suffered from Achilles tendon and knee injuries, missing the 2010 athletics season. She returned to competition in 2011 and became the British 100m champion. Kwakye reached the semi-final of the Women's 100m at the 2011 World Championships, in Daegu, South Korea. In 2012, Kwakye won the British 60m Indoor title, but failed to qualify for the 2012 Summer Olympics due to injury. She did not compete in 2013.

Kwakye announced her retirement from competition in January 2014.

== Broadcasting career ==
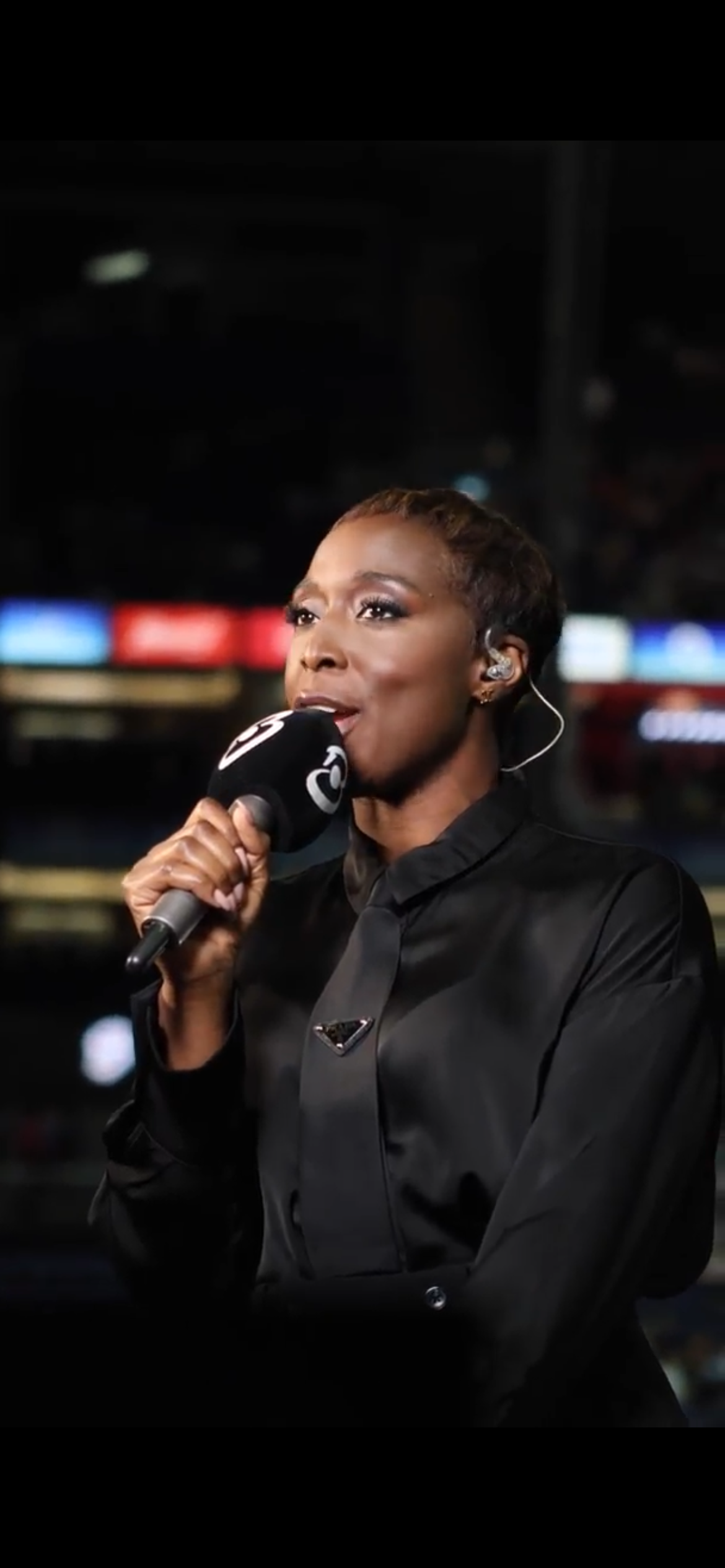
Kwakye in 2024

After retiring, Kwakye studied for an NCTJ qualification and began working for BBC Radio Berkshire, before joining BBC Radio London's sports team in 2014.

Kwakye is a regular host of BBC Radio 5 Live's Football Daily podcast and covers for 5 Live Sport. She is also a regular contributor to Ian Wright's podcast, Wrighty's House.

Kwakye has presented various sports programmes for BBC Sport, including the 2018 Summer Youth Olympics, 2019 World Aquatics Championships, 2019 World Athletics Championships, The Women's Football Show and reported for the 2019 BBC Sports Personality of the Year Award. She is the BBC's athletics trackside reporter.

In addition to being the BBC's trackside reporter for athletics events, at the delayed 2020 Summer Olympics, Kwakye presented a highlights show each evening with Nihal Arthanayake. For the 2022 Winter Olympics, Kwakye presented coverage of the games each morning for the BBC. She presented morning coverage of the 2024 Summer Olympics, alongside JJ Chalmers. Kwakye presented the afternoon action for the BBC at the 2026 Winter Olympics.

Kwakye previously presented a weekly hour long show at 1:00pm each Saturday on BBC Radio London entitled The Women's Sport Show.

In December 2020, Kwakye was announced as Channel 5's lead presenter for their boxing coverage.

On 31 October 2023, Martin Lewis welcomed Kwakye to ITV's The Martin Lewis Money Show as the series co-presenter.

Kwakye is a keen writer and has been published by The Guardian, the Daily Mirror and BT Sport. Kwakye also works for the Youth Sport Trust as an Athlete Mentor on the Sky Sports Changing Lives program. She was also a reporter for the Sky Sports children's TV show Game Changers from 2013 until 2019.

== Personal life ==
Both of Kwakye's parents were born in the Brong-Ahafo Region of Ghana. The Kwakye family moved to England in the early 1980s. Kwakye's younger brother, Louis, is also involved in National athletics. Her younger sister, Chelsea, is the co-author of Taking Up Space, a Penguin (Merky Books) book released in 2020.

Kwakye is a graduate of Loughborough University where she attained a degree in Politics and Economics. She is close friends with singer Estelle.

Kwakye was the lead trainer on the set for 2012 British film Fast Girls, training Lily James and Lenora Crichlow for their respective roles as athletes. She also featured in director Sam Blair's 2012 documentary film Personal Best.

In October 2016, Kwakye was part of a consortium involved with a takeover of English National League football team Dagenham & Redbridge.

In 2017, Kwakye self-published a children's book, Femi the Fox.

Kwakye was appointed Member of the Order of the British Empire (MBE) in the 2021 Birthday Honours for services to sport and sports broadcasting.

== Personal bests ==
Updated 26 April 2009

Event	Time	Location	Date
60 metres	7.08 s	Valencia, Spain	7 March 2008
100 metres	11.14 s	Beijing, China	17 August 2008
200 metres	23.11 s	Cuxhaven, Germany	14 July 2007

All information taken from IAAF profile.

== See also ==
- List of British champions in 100 metres
- List of British champions in 200 metres
