= 2003 European Athletics U23 Championships – Women's 100 metres =

The women's 100 metres event at the 2003 European Athletics U23 Championships was held in Bydgoszcz, Poland, at Zawisza Stadion on 17 and 19 July.

== Medalists ==
Gold	Yeoryia Kokloni; Greece
Silver	Daria Onyśko; Poland
Bronze	Aksana Drahun; Belarus

== Results ==
=== Final ===
19 July
Wind: 1.3 m/s

Rank	Name	Nationality	Time	Notes
1st place, gold medalist(s)	Yeoryia Kokloni	Greece	11.33	
2nd place, silver medalist(s)	Daria Onyśko	Poland	11.46	
3rd place, bronze medalist(s)	Aksana Drahun	Belarus	11.48	
4	Maja Nose	Slovenia	11.50	
5	Élodie Ouédraogo	Belgium	11.55	
6	Nataliya Pyhyda	Ukraine	11.59	
7	Jeanette Kwakye	United Kingdom	11.62	
8	Małgorzata Flejszar	Poland	11.66	

=== Heats ===
17 July
Qualified: first 2 in each heat and 2 best to the Final

==== Heat 1 ====
Wind: 0.0 m/s

Rank	Name	Nationality	Time	Notes
1	Daria Onyśko	Poland	11.56	Q
2	Aksana Drahun	Belarus	11.61	Q
3	Leonarda Morana	Italy	11.79	
4	Anna Boyle	Ireland	11.83	
5	Audrey Rochtus	Belgium	11.86	
6	Gwladys Belliard	France	11.91	
7	Jennifer Schneeberger	Austria	11.97	
8	Sara Maroncelli	San Marino	13.42	

==== Heat 2 ====
Wind: 0.4 m/s

Rank	Name	Nationality	Time	Notes
1	Yeoryia Kokloni	Greece	11.45	Q
2	Nataliya Pyhyda	Ukraine	11.53	Q
3	Maja Nose	Slovenia	11.59	q
4	Katja Wakan	Germany	11.67	
5	Amélie Huyghes	France	11.80	
5	Nikolett Listár	Hungary	11.86	
7	Yuliyana Belcheva	Bulgaria	11.93	
8	Emily Maher	Ireland	11.95	

==== Heat 3 ====
Wind: -0.2 m/s

Rank	Name	Nationality	Time	Notes
1	Jeanette Kwakye	United Kingdom	11.59	Q
2	Élodie Ouédraogo	Belgium	11.63	Q
3	Małgorzata Flejszar	Poland	11.65	q
4	Erica Marchetti	Italy	11.68	
5	Emmelie Barenfeld	Sweden	11.72	
6	Iryna Shepetyuk	Ukraine	11.85	
7	Elina Lax	Finland	11.97	
	Katrin Käärt	Estonia	DNF	

== Participation ==
According to an unofficial count, 24 athletes from 18 countries participated in the event.

- Austria (1)
- Belarus (1)
- Belgium (2)
- Bulgaria (1)
- Estonia (1)
- Finland (1)
- France (2)
- Germany (1)
- Greece (1)
- Hungary (1)
- Ireland (2)
- Italy (2)
- Poland (2)
- San Marino (1)
- Slovenia (1)
- Sweden (1)
- Ukraine (2)
- United Kingdom (1)
