= Athletics at the 2011 Pan American Games – Women's 100 metres =

Women's 100 metres at the 2011 Pan American Games
- Venue: Telmex Athletics Stadium
- Dates: October 24 – October 25
- Competitors: 19 from 13 nations

Medalists
Gold medal	Rosângela Santos	Brazil
Silver medal	Barbara Pierre	United States
Bronze medal	Shakera Reece	Barbados

The women's 100 metres sprint competition of the athletics events at the 2011 Pan American Games will take place between the 24 and 25 of October at the Telmex Athletics Stadium. The defending Pan American Games champion is Mikele Barber of the United States.

== Records ==
Prior to this competition, the existing world and Pan American Games records were as follows:

World record	Florence Griffith-Joyner (USA)	10.49	Indianapolis, United States	16 July 1988
Pan American Games record	Mikele Barber (USA)	11.02	Rio de Janeiro, Brazil	2007

== Qualification ==
Each National Olympic Committee (NOC) was able to enter up to two entrants providing they had met the minimum standard (11.50) in the qualifying period (January 1, 2010 to September 14, 2011).

== Schedule ==
Date	Time	Round
October 24, 2011	14:45	Heats
October 24, 2011	17:30	Semifinals
October 25, 2011	17:40	Final

== Results ==
All times shown are in seconds.

KEY:	q	Fastest non-qualifiers	Q	Qualified	NR	National record	PB	Personal best	SB	Seasonal best

=== Heats ===
The first round scheduled for October 24 was bypassed as there were only 19 competitors entered.

=== Semifinals ===
The semifinals were held on October 24, with three semi-finals. The first two places plus the next to best times qualified.

Rank	Heat	Name	Nationality	Time	Notes
1	1	Rosângela Santos	Brazil	11.26	Q PB
2	2	Barbara Pierre	United States	11.37	Q
3	1	Yomara Hinestroza	Colombia	11.41	Q
4	3	Shakera Reece	Barbados	11.43	Q PB
5	1	Laverne Jones-Ferrette	Virgin Islands	11.45	q
6	3	Ana Cláudia Silva	Brazil	11.46	Q
7	2	Nelkis Casabona	Cuba	11.56	Q
8	2	Mariely Sánchez	Dominican Republic	11.57	q PB
9	2	Courtney Cerene Patterson	Virgin Islands	11.59	
10	2	Tameka Williams	Saint Kitts and Nevis	11.68	
11	3	Kenyanna Wilson	United States	11.74	
12	3	Eliecith Palacios	Colombia	11.77	
13	3	Jessica Lynn Sanchez	Mexico	11.80	PB
14	3	Kerri-Ann Mitchell	Canada	11.81	
15	1	Daniela Claudia Pavez	Chile	11.85	
16	1	Ramona Van der Vloot	Suriname	12.01	PB
17	1	Charnelle Enriques	Belize	13.15	
18	2	Matilde Álvarez	Mexico	13.25	
	1	Fany Chalas	Dominican Republic	DNS	

=== Final ===
Rank	Athlete	Country	Time	Notes
1st place, gold medalist(s)	Rosângela Santos	Brazil	11.22	PB
2nd place, silver medalist(s)	Barbara Pierre	United States	11.25	
3rd place, bronze medalist(s)	Shakera Reece	Barbados	11.26	NR
4	Ana Cláudia Silva	Brazil	11.35	
5	Mariely Sánchez	Dominican Republic	11.49	NR
6	Yomara Hinestroza	Colombia	11.50	
7	Nelkis Casabona	Cuba	11.56	
8	Laverne Jones-Ferrette	Virgin Islands	11.60	
