= 2005 European Athletics Indoor Championships – Women's 200 metres =

The women's 200 metres event at the 2005 European Athletics Indoor Championships were held on March 5–6, 2005. This was the last time the 200 metres were contested at the European Indoor Championships.

== Medalists ==
Gold	Silver	Bronze
Ivet Lalova; Bulgaria	Karin Mayr-Krifka; Austria	Jacqueline Poelman; Netherlands

== Results ==
=== Heats ===
The winner of each heat (Q) and the next 5 fastest (q) qualified for the semifinals.

Rank	Heat	Name	Nationality	Time	Notes
1	5	Karin Mayr-Krifka	Austria	23.20	Q
2	3	Ivet Lalova	Bulgaria	23.21	Q
3	4	Yekaterina Kondratyeva	Russia	23.22	Q
4	4	Anna Pacholak	Poland	23.24	q, PB
5	5	Lina Jacques-Sébastien	France	23.41	q, PB
6	1	Fabé Dia	France	23.47	Q
7	1	Jacqueline Poelman	Netherlands	23.48	q
8	5	Alenka Bikar	Slovenia	23.53	q, SB
9	3	Sylviane Félix	France	23.57	q
10	3	Ciara Sheehy	Ireland	23.73	SB
11	2	Angela Moroșanu	Romania	23.79	Q
12	4	Daniela Graglia	Italy	23.90	
13	4	Kristina Žumer	Slovenia	24.00	
14	1	Belén Recio	Spain	24.12	
	2	Yuliya Gushchina	Russia	DQ	
	2	Natalya Salahub	Belarus	DQ	
	3	Natalia Ivanova	Russia	DNS	
	5	Katrin Käärt	Estonia	DNS	

=== Semifinals ===
First 3 of each heat (Q) qualified directly for the final.

Rank	Heat	Name	Nationality	Time	Notes
1	1	Ivet Lalova	Bulgaria	23.08	Q
2	2	Karin Mayr-Krifka	Austria	23.24	Q
3	1	Yekaterina Kondratyeva	Russia	23.27	Q
4	1	Anna Pacholak	Poland	23.45	Q
5	1	Lina Jacques-Sébastien	France	23.49	
6	2	Jacqueline Poelman	Netherlands	23.54	Q
7	2	Fabé Dia	France	23.57	Q
8	2	Angela Moroșanu	Romania	23.63	SB
9	2	Alenka Bikar	Slovenia	23.82	
10	1	Sylviane Félix	France	23.93	

=== Final ===
Rank	Lane	Name	Nationality	Time	React	Notes
1st place, gold medalist(s)	5	Ivet Lalova	Bulgaria	22.91	0.155	NR
2nd place, silver medalist(s)	6	Karin Mayr-Krifka	Austria	22.94	0.194	SB
3rd place, bronze medalist(s)	4	Jacqueline Poelman	Netherlands	23.42	0.157	SB
4	2	Anna Pacholak	Poland	23.55	0.178	
5	3	Yekaterina Kondratyeva	Russia	23.57	0.165	
6	1	Fabé Dia	France	24.23	0.168	
