= Nikolett Listár =

Hungarian sprinter

Listár Nikolett
Personal information
- Born: 6 December 1983 (age 42) Székesfehérvár, Hungary
- Height: 1.69 m (5 ft 7 in)

Sport
- Country: Hungary
- Sport: Athletics
- Event(s): 100 meters, 200 meters
- Club: ARAK
Medal record
Representing Hungary
European Athletics U23 Championshipe
Silver medal – second place	2005, Erfurt	200m
Summer Universiade
Bronze medal – third place	2005, İzmir	200m
Hungarian Athletic Outdoor Championships
Bronze medal – third place	1999	4x100m
Bronze medal – third place	2002	200m
Silver medal – second place	2003	100m
Silver medal – second place	2003	200m
Gold medal – first place	2003	4x100m
Bronze medal – third place	2003	4x400m
Gold medal – first place	2003	Long jump in team
Silver medal – second place	2004	100m
Silver medal – second place	2004	200m
Silver medal – second place	2004	4x100m
Silver medal – second place	2005	100m
Gold medal – first place	2005	200m
Gold medal – first place	2005	4x100m
Gold medal – first place	2006	200m
Gold medal – first place	2006	4x100m
Silver medal – second place	2006	4x400m
Silver medal – second place	2007	100m
Gold medal – first place	2008	100m
Silver medal – second place	2008	200m
Gold medal – first place	2008	4x100m
Silver medal – second place	2009	4x100m
Silver medal – second place	2010	4x100m
Hungarian Athletic Indoor Championships
Silver medal – second place	2003	60m
Gold medal – first place	2003	200m
Silver medal – second place	2004	60m
Gold medal – first place	2004	200m
Bronze medal – third place	2004	4x400m
Silver medal – second place	2007	60m
Gold medal – first place	2007	200m
Gold medal – first place	2007	4x40000m
Gold medal – first place	2008	200m
Gold medal – first place	2008	400m
Gold medal – first place	2008	4x400m

Nikolett Listár (born 6 December 1983) is a Hungarian sprinter. Her main events are 100m and 200m.

- Team: Alba Régia Atlétikai Klub (ARAK), Székesfehérvár.
- Trainer: Tamas Varga
- Personal bests:
  - 100m 11.71 İzmir 2005
  - 200m 23.19 Erfurt 2005

== Achievements ==
Year	Competition	Venue	Position	Event	Notes
Representing Hungary
2008	World Indoor Championships	Valencia, Spain	15th	400 m	55.37
2005	Universiade	İzmir, Turkey	3rd	100 m	11.71 (wind: +1.1 m/s)
2005	Universiade	İzmir, Turkey	8th	200 m	24.08 (wind: -1.0 m/s)
2005	European U23 Championships	Erfurt, Germany	9th (h)	100m	11.82 (wind: -1.2 m/s)
2005	European U23 Championships	Erfurt, Germany	2nd	200m	23.19 (wind: +0.7 m/s) U-23NR
2004	World Indoor Championships	Budapest, Hungary	10th	200 m	23.71 U-23NR
2003	European U23 Championships	Bydgoszcz, Poland	16th (h)	100m	11.86 (wind: 0.4 m/s)
2003	European U23 Championships	Bydgoszcz, Poland	6th	200m	23.68 (wind: 1.0 m/s)
2002	World Junior Championships	Kingston, Jamaica	17th (sf)	100 m	11.98 (wind: +0.3 m/s)
2002	World Junior Championships	Kingston, Jamaica	10th (sf)	200 m	24.10 (wind: +0.4 m/s)
