= 2006 European Athletics Championships – Women's 100 metres =

Women's 100 metres at the 2006 European Athletics Championships
- Venue: Ullevi
- Location: Gothenburg
- Dates: 8 August (heats); 9 August (semifinals & final)
- Competitors: 30 from 18 nations
- Winning time: 11.06

Medalists
gold medal	Kim Gevaert	Belgium
silver medal	Yekaterina Grigoryeva	Russia
bronze medal	Irina Khabarova	Russia

These are the results of the Women's 100 metres event at the 2006 European Athletics Championships in Gothenburg, Sweden. There were a total number of 30 participating athletes.

The final was held on Wednesday August 9, 2006. Gevaert lead from the start, and was an obvious winner, with a few other athletes in contention however Grigoryeva and the 40-year-old Khabarova claimed the silver and bronze medals respectively.

== Schedule ==
Date	Time	Round
August 8, 2006	11:50	Round 1
August 9, 2006	18:15	Semifinals
August 9, 2006	20:25	Final

== Records ==
Standing records prior to the 2006 European Athletics Championships
World Record	Florence Griffith-Joyner (USA)	10.49	July 16, 1988	Indianapolis, United States
European Record	Christine Arron (FRA)	10.73	August 19, 1998	Budapest, Hungary
Event Record	Christine Arron (FRA)	10.73	August 19, 1998	Budapest, Hungary

== Results ==
KEY:	q	Fastest non-qualifiers	Q	Qualified	NR	National record	PB	Personal best	SB	Seasonal best

=== Round 1 ===
Qualification: First 3 in each heat (Q) and the next 4 fastest (q) advance to the semifinals.

Rank	Heat	Name	Nationality	Time	Notes
1	1	Kim Gevaert	Belgium	11.19	Q
2	2	Joice Maduaka	United Kingdom	11.24	Q
3	4	Sylviane Félix	France	11.26	Q, SB
4	1	Yekaterina Grigoryeva	Russia	11.27	Q
4	4	Irina Khabarova	Russia	11.27	Q
6	2	Alena Neumiarzhitskaya	Belarus	11.28	Q
7	3	Yuliya Gushchina	Russia	11.29	Q
7	4	Georgia Kokloni	Greece	11.29	Q, PB
9	3	Véronique Mang	France	11.31	Q
10	4	Yulia Nestsiarenka	Belarus	11.33	q
11	1	Anyika Onuora	United Kingdom	11.38	Q
12	2	Merlene Ottey	Slovenia	11.41	Q, SB
12	3	Emma Ania	United Kingdom	11.41	Q
14	1	Daria Onyśko	Poland	11.45	q, SB
14	3	Pia Tajnikar	Slovenia	11.45	q
14	4	Verena Sailer	Germany	11.45	q
17	2	Ksenija Balta	Estonia	11.47	NR
18	2	Carima Louami	France	11.48	SB
18	4	Belén Recio	Spain	11.48	PB
20	2	Katja Wakan	Germany	11.54	
21	1	Anna Boyle	Ireland	11.60	
22	3	Bettina Müller-Weissina	Austria	11.61	
22	4	Dorota Dydo	Poland	11.61	
24	1	Heidi Hannula	Finland	11.64	
25	1	Kristina Žumer	Slovenia	11.69	
26	3	Audra Dagelytė	Lithuania	11.74	
27	3	Emma Rienas	Sweden	11.76	
28	2	Aleksandra Vojneska	Macedonia	12.15	
29	2	Diane Borg	Malta	12.42	
	4	Emily Maher	Ireland		DNS

=== Semifinals ===
First 4 of each Semifinal will be directly qualified (Q) for the Final.

==== Semifinal 1 ====
Rank	Lane	Name	Nationality	React	Time	Notes
1	3	Joice Maduaka	United Kingdom	0.129	11.32	Q
2	6	Irina Khabarova	Russia	0.143	11.33	Q
3	4	Sylviane Félix	France	0.160	11.38	Q
4	7	Daria Onyśko	Poland	0.166	11.41	Q, PB
5	2	Merlene Ottey	Slovenia	0.147	11.44	
6	5	Alena Neumiarzhitskaya	Belarus	0.209	11.45	
7	1	Anyika Onuora	United Kingdom	0.138	11.45	
8	8	Verena Sailer	Germany	0.157	11.61	

==== Semifinal 2 ====
Rank	Lane	Name	Nationality	React	Time	Notes
1	3	Kim Gevaert	Belgium	0.148	11.19	Q
2	1	Yuliya Gushchina	Russia	0.160	11.25	Q
3	5	Yulia Nestsiarenka	Belarus	0.145	11.28	Q
4	4	Yekaterina Grigoryeva	Russia	0.158	11.28	Q
5	6	Georgia Kokloni	Greece	0.157	11.29	PB
6	7	Emma Ania	United Kingdom	0.178	11.49	
7	8	Véronique Mang	France	0.159	11.49	
8	2	Pia Tajnikar	Slovenia	0.150	11.61	

=== Final ===
Rank	Lane	Name	Nationality	React	Time	Notes
1st place, gold medalist(s)	4	Kim Gevaert	Belgium	0.144	11.06	
2nd place, silver medalist(s)	1	Yekaterina Grigoryeva	Russia	0.150	11.22	SB
3rd place, bronze medalist(s)	5	Irina Khabarova	Russia	0.144	11.22	
4	4	Joice Maduaka	United Kingdom	0.164	11.24	
5	6	Yuliya Gushchina	Russia	0.146	11.31	
6	7	Yulia Nestsiarenka	Belarus	0.166	11.34	
7	8	Sylviane Félix	France	0.190	11.40	
8	2	Daria Onyśko	Poland	0.173	11.43	
