= Yuliya Gushchina =

Russian sprinter (born 1983)

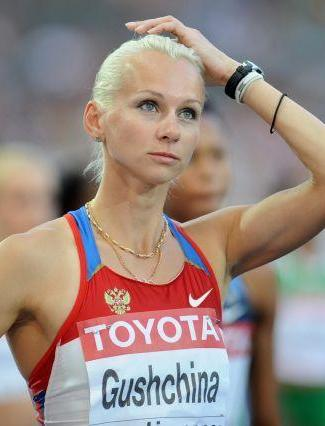

Personal information
- Born: 4 March 1983 (age 43)
- Height: 1.75 m (5 ft 9 in)
- Weight: 62 kg (137 lb)

Sport
- Country: Russia
- Sport: Women's athletics
- Event: 4 × 400 m Relay
Medal record
Olympic Games
Disqualified	2008 Beijing	4 × 100 m relay
Disqualified	2008 Beijing	4 × 400 m relay
Disqualified	2012 London	4 × 400 m relay
World Championships
Disqualified	2013 Moscow	4 × 400 m relay
World Indoor Championships
Gold medal – first place	2008 Valencia	4 × 400 m relay
Disqualified	2012 Istanbul	4 × 400 m relay
European Championships
Gold medal – first place	2006 Gothenburg	4 × 100 m relay
Silver medal – second place	2006 Gothenburg	200 meters
World Junior Championships
Bronze medal – third place	2002 Kingston	4 × 100 m relay

Yuliya Aleksandrovna Gushchina (Russian: Ю́лия Александровна Гу́щина, born 4 March 1983 in Novocherkassk, Rostov Oblast) is a retired Russian sprinter who specializes in the 200 metres.

On 30 November 2017 her results from the 2012 Summer Olympics were disqualified as a result of a positive doping test.

== Career ==
Gushchina represented Russia at the 2008 Summer Olympics in Beijing competing at the 4 × 100 metres relay, together with Aleksandra Fedoriva, Yuliya Chermoshanskaya and Yevgeniya Polyakova. In their first round heat they placed second behind Jamaica, but in front of Germany and China. With this result they qualified for the final in which they sprinted to 42.31 seconds, the first place and the gold medal. Belgium and Nigeria took the other medals. The Jamaican team did not finish due to a mistake in the baton exchange. In August 2016, Gushchina and her three Russian teammates were stripped of their Olympic gold medal due to a doping violation by Chermoshanskaya.

With the 2017 announcement of the disqualification of the 2012 Russian 4 × 400 team, due to the doping violation of Antonina Krivoshapka, all three of Gushchina's Olympic medals have been taken away.

In the 2009 World Championships in Berlin, Gushchina changed from the 400 m to the 200 m and competed, she reached the 200 m semi-finals but narrowly missed out to the finals, in the 4 × 100 m relay Russia were fourth in the final a great disappointment, Jamaica won, Bahamas 2nd and Germany 3rd.

In the 2013 World Championships, during the medal ceremony for the women's 4 × 400 metres relay images of Kseniya Ryzhova and Yuliya Gushchina (Note: Several sources misidentified the pictures of Gushchina as fellow relay medallist Tatyana Firova.) sharing a kiss on the lips spread through social media and were interpreted as a protest against the anti-gay laws. Both Ryzhova and Gushchina denied any intention to make such a protest, rather they were simply happy with their athletic success, and stated that they were married to men. Although reports were principally focused on the pair, all four of the Russia relay runners briefly kissed each other on the podium. Ryzhova described her assumed connection to LGBT as insulting. The Russian Minister for Sport, Vitaly Mutko, said that Western media had overemphasised the issue, noting that same-sex relations are not illegal in Russia and sparser coverage of the issue in domestic media.

== International competitions ==
Representing Russia
Year	Competition	Venue	Position	Event	Time	Notes
2002	World Junior Championships	Kingston, Jamaica	11th (sf)	200 m	24.12	wind: +0.4 m/s
2002	World Junior Championships	Kingston, Jamaica	3rd	4 × 400 m relay	3:30.72	
2003	European U23 Championships	Bydgoszcz, Poland	5th	200 m	23.59	wind: 1.0 m/s
2003	European U23 Championships	Bydgoszcz, Poland	1st	4 × 400 m relay	3:29.55	
2005	European Indoor Championships	Madrid, Spain	–	200 m	DQ	
2005	World Championships	Helsinki, Finland	6th	200 m	22.75	
2005	World Championships	Helsinki, Finland	–	4 × 100 m relay	DNF	
2005	World Athletics Final	Monte Carlo, Monaco	6th	200 m	23.18	
2006	European Championships	Gothenburg, Sweden	5th	100 m	11.31	
2006	European Championships	Gothenburg, Sweden	2nd	200 m	22.93	
2006	European Championships	Gothenburg, Sweden	1st	4 × 100 m relay	42.71	
2007	European Indoor Championships	Birmingham, United Kingdom	17th (h)	60 m	7.31	
2007	World Championships	Osaka, Japan	5th	4 × 100 m relay	42.97	
2008	World Indoor Championships	Valencia, Spain	1st	4 × 400 m relay	3:28.17	
2008	Olympic Games	Beijing, China	4th	400 m	50.01	
2008	Olympic Games	Beijing, China	DSQ (1st)	4 × 100 m relay	42.31	
2008	Olympic Games	Beijing, China	DSQ (2nd)	4 × 400 m relay	3:18.82	
2009	World Championships	Berlin, Germany	17th (sf)	200 m	23.24	
2009	World Championships	Berlin, Germany	4th	4 × 100 m relay	43.00	
2010	European Championships	Barcelona, Spain	5th	4 × 100 m relay	42.91	
2011	World Championships	Daegu, South Korea	18th (sf)	200 m	23.26	
2011	World Championships	Daegu, South Korea	6th	4 × 100 m relay	42.93	
2012	World Indoor Championships	Istanbul, Turkey	DSQ (3rd)	4 × 400 m relay	3:29.55	
2013	World Championships	Moscow, Russia	DSQ (1st)	4 × 400 m relay	3:20.19	

== Personal bests ==
- 100 metres – 11.13 s (2006)
- 200 metres – 22.53 s (2005)
- 400 metres – 49.28 s (2012)

== See also ==
- List of doping cases in athletics
