= 2009 IAAF World Athletics Final – Results =

These are the results of the 2009 IAAF World Athletics Final, which took place in Thessaloniki, Greece on 12 and 13 September.

The year's top seven athletes, based on their points ranking of the 2009 IAAF World Athletics Tour, qualified to compete in each event, with an extra four athletes selected for races of 1500 metres and above. One additional athlete, a wildcard, was allocated to each event by the IAAF and replacement athletes were admitted to replace the qualified athletes that could not attend the final.

Key

Wild card athlete

== Track ==
Events
100 m	200 m	400 m	800 m	1500 m	3000 m	5000 m	110/100 m h	400 m h	3000 m st

=== 100 metres ===
Men's
Rank	Athlete	Time (sec)	Notes	WAT rank
Gold medal	Tyson Gay (USA)	9.88		5
Silver medal	Asafa Powell (JAM)	9.90		1
Bronze medal	Darvis Patton (USA)	10.00		3
4	Michael Rodgers (USA)	10.09		9
5	Michael Frater (JAM)	10.16		7
6	Churandy Martina (AHO)	10.20		6
7	Ronald Pognon (FRA)	10.30		18
8	Simeon Williamson (GBR)	10.48		10

Women's
Rank	Athlete	Time (sec)	Notes	WAT rank
Gold medal	Carmelita Jeter (USA)	10.67	CR	2
Silver medal	Shelly-Ann Fraser (JAM)	10.89		3
Bronze medal	Kerron Stewart (JAM)	10.90		1
4	Chandra Sturrup (BAH)	11.17		4
5	Sherone Simpson (JAM)	11.20		20
6	Debbie Ferguson-McKenzie (BAH)	11.24		5
7	LaVerne Jones-Ferrette (ISV)	11.25		9
8	Kelly-Ann Baptiste (TRI)	11.27		9

=== 200 metres ===
Men's
Rank	Athlete	Time (sec)	Notes	WAT rank
Gold medal	Usain Bolt (JAM)	19.68	=CR	3
Silver medal	Wallace Spearmon (USA)	20.21		1
Bronze medal	Brendan Christian (ATG)	20.65		4
4	Stéphan Buckland (MRI)	20.75		9
5	Paul Hession (IRL)	20.78		2
6	Marlon Devonish (GBR)	20.85		7
7	Mark Jelks (USA)	20.90		6
8	Brian Dzingai (ZIM)	21.22		4

Women's
Rank	Athlete	Time (sec)	Notes	WAT rank
Gold medal	Allyson Felix (USA)	22.29		5
Silver medal	Sanya Richards (USA)	22.29	SB	41
Bronze medal	Kerron Stewart (JAM)	22.42	SB	3
4	Debbie Ferguson-McKenzie (BAH)	22.45		1
5	Shericka Williams (JAM)	22.57	SB	4
6	Cydonie Mothersille (CAY)	22.83		8
7	LaVerne Jones-Ferrette (ISV)	22.90		2
8	Emily Freeman (GBR)	22.91		7

=== 400 metres ===
Men's
Rank	Athlete	Time (sec)	Notes	WAT rank
Gold medal	LaShawn Merritt (USA)	44.93		4
Silver medal	Chris Brown (BAH)	45.49		2
Bronze medal	David Neville (USA)	45.60		8
4	Michael Bingham (GBR)	45.67		6
5	Gary Kikaya (COD)	45.72		7
6	David Gillick (IRL)	46.09		5
7	Angelo Taylor (USA)	46.20		10
8	Sean Wroe (AUS)	47.10		9

Women's
Rank	Athlete	Time (sec)	Notes	WAT rank
Gold medal	Sanya Richards (USA)	49.95		1
Silver medal	Novlene Williams-Mills (JAM)	50.34		4
Bronze medal	Shericka Williams (JAM)	50.49		2
4	Nicola Sanders (GBR)	51.01		9
5	Amantle Montsho (BOT)	51.39		3
6	Christine Ohuruogu (GBR)	51.42		7
7	Tatyana Firova (RUS)	51.81		11
8	Monica Hargrove (USA)	52.05		5

=== 800 metres ===
Men's
Rank	Athlete	Time (min)	Notes	WAT rank
Gold medal	David Rudisha (KEN)	1:44.85	CR	2
Silver medal	Gary Reed (CAN)	1:45.23		4
Bronze medal	Mbulaeni Mulaudzi (RSA)	1:45.53		7
4	Bram Som (NED)	1:45.86		16
5	Yuriy Borzakovskiy (RUS)	1:46.04		1
6	Nick Symmonds (USA)	1:46.19		9
7	Alfred Kirwa Yego (KEN)	1:46.66		3
8	Mohammed Al-Salhi (KSA)	1:50.55		8

Women's
Rank	Athlete	Time (min)	Notes	WAT rank
Gold medal	Anna Willard (USA)	2:00.20		7
Silver medal	Maggie Vessey (USA)	2:00.31		2
Bronze medal	Jennifer Meadows (GBR)	2:00.41		6
4	Mariya Savinova (RUS)	2:00.72		4
5	Elisa Cusma Piccione (ITA)	2:00.84		3
6	Mayte Martínez (ESP)	2:00.86		4
7	Jemma Simpson (GBR)	2:00.99		1
8	Oksana Zbrozhek (RUS)	2:04.79		9

=== 1500 metres ===
Men's
Rank	Athlete	Time (min)	Notes	WAT rank
Gold medal	William Biwott Tanui (KEN)	3:35.04		2
Silver medal	Leonel Manzano (USA)	3:35.40		8
Bronze medal	Augustine Kiprono Choge (KEN)	3:35.46		1
4	Yusuf Saad Kamel (BHR)	3:36.11		11
5	Gideon Gathimba (KEN)	3:36.36		9
6	Belal Mansoor Ali (BHR)	3:36.42		2
7	Mohamed Moustaoui (MAR)	3:37.43		14
8	Deresse Mekonnen (ETH)	3:37.51		4
9	Nathan Brannen (CAN)	3:40.12		10
10	Christian Obrist (ITA)	3:45.81		—

Women's
Rank	Athlete	Time (min)	Notes	WAT rank
Gold medal	Nancy Lagat (KEN)	4:13.63		24
Silver medal	Hannah England (GBR)	4:14.05		7
Bronze medal	Christin Wurth-Thomas (USA)	4:14.10		3
4	Maryam Yusuf Jamal (BHR)	4:14.12		1
5	Shannon Rowbury (USA)	4:14.18		5
6	Gelete Burka (ETH)	4:14.51		1
7	Anna Alminova (RUS)	4:15.76		9
8	Lisa Dobriskey (GBR)	4:15.94		4
9	Sonja Roman (SLO)	4:17.98		10
10	Viola Kibiwot (KEN)	4:19.35		8
11	Lidia Chojecka (POL)	4:21.34		16
	Btissam Lakhouad (MAR)	DNS		14

=== 3000 metres ===
Men's
Rank	Athlete	Time (min)	Notes	WAT rank
Gold medal	Kenenisa Bekele (ETH)	8:03.79		12
Silver medal	Bernard Lagat (USA)	8:04.00		3
Bronze medal	Sammy Alex Mutahi (KEN)	8:04.64		7
4	Deresse Mekonnen (ETH)	8:05.32		4
5	Silas Kipruto (KEN)	8:05.54		8
6	Chris Solinsky (USA)	8:05.76		11
7	Edwin Soi (KEN)	8:06.69		4
8	Mark Kosgey Kiptoo (KEN)	8:07.22		10
9	Eliud Kipchoge (KEN)	8:07.26		1
10	Thomas Longosiwa (KEN)	8:07.63		2
11	Leonard Komon (KEN)	8:12.51		8

Women's
Rank	Athlete	Time (min)	Notes	WAT rank
Gold medal	Meseret Defar (ETH)	8:30.15	WL	—
Silver medal	Vivian Cheruiyot (KEN)	8:30.61	PB	3
Bronze medal	Wude Ayalew (ETH)	8:30.93	SB	1
4	Iness Chepkesis Chenonge (KEN)	8:37.17	PB	2
5	Kalkidan Gezahegne (ETH)	8:38.61	PB	6
6	Sylvia Jebiwott Kibet (KEN)	8:46.46		3
7	Lidia Chojecka (POL)	8:49.55		3
8	Laura Kenney (GBR)	8:50.37	PB	8
9	Frehiwat Goshu (ETH)	8:58.21		11
10	Krisztina Papp (HUN)	8:58.47		11
11	Kseniya Agafonova (RUS)	9:11.21		11
12	Konstadina Kefala (GRE)	9:43.14	PB	—

=== 5000 metres ===
Men's
Rank	Athlete	Time (min)	Notes	WAT rank
Gold medal	Imane Merga (ETH)	13:29.75		3
Silver medal	Micah Kipkemboi Kogo (KEN)	13:29.76		7
Bronze medal	Edwin Soi (KEN)	13:29.76		6
4	Joseph Kitur Kiplimo (KEN)	13:30.22		28
5	Mark Kosgey Kiptoo (KEN)	13:30.59		8
6	Lucas Kimeli Rotich (KEN)	13:30.75		14
7	Vincent Kiprop Chepkok (KEN)	13:30.76		2
8	Silas Kipruto (KEN)	13:31.48		28
9	Abraham Chebii (KEN)	13:35.59		10
10	Leonard Komon (KEN)	13:41.93		16
11	Mike Kigen (KEN)	13:45.96		10
12	Ali Abdosh (ETH)	13:50.82		4

Women's
Rank	Athlete	Time (min)	Notes	WAT rank
Gold medal	Meseret Defar (ETH)	15:25.31		6
Silver medal	Tirunesh Dibaba (ETH)	15:25.92		1
Bronze medal	Vivian Cheruiyot (KEN)	15:26.21		5
4	Sylvia Jebiwott Kibet (KEN)	15:26.50		14
5	Wude Ayalew (ETH)	15:27.34		12
6	Sentayehu Ejigu (ETH)	15:28.96		6
7	Iness Chepkesis Chenonge (KEN)	15:29.55		15
8	Grace Momanyi (KEN)	15:32.43		15
9	Meselech Melkamu (ETH)	15:32.58		4
10	Zakia Mrisho Mohamed (TAN)	15:38.15		—
11	Jennifer Rhines (USA)	15:42.92		2

=== 110/100 metres hurdles ===
Men's
Rank	Athlete	Time (sec)	Notes	WAT rank
Gold medal	Ryan Brathwaite (BAR)	13.16		5
Silver medal	Dexter Faulk (USA)	13.26		2
Bronze medal	Dwight Thomas (JAM)	13.29		3
4	Petr Svoboda (CZE)	13.50		19
5	Andrew Turner (GBR)	13.57		7
6	Joel Brown (USA)	13.62		5
7	Antwon Hicks (USA)	13.81		4
8	Ryan Wilson (USA)	14.19		11

Women's
Rank	Athlete	Time (sec)	Notes	WAT rank
Gold medal	Brigitte Foster-Hylton (JAM)	12.58		1
Silver medal	Dawn Harper (USA)	12.61		4
Bronze medal	Delloreen Ennis-London (JAM)	12.61		6
4	Priscilla Lopes-Schliep (CAN)	12.61		1
5	Perdita Felicien (CAN)	12.61		7
6	Damu Cherry (USA)	12.75		5
7	Lacena Golding-Clarke (JAM)	13.03		12
8	Danielle Carruthers (USA)	13.37		10

=== 400 metres hurdles ===
Men's
Rank	Athlete	Time (sec)	Notes	WAT rank
Gold medal	Kerron Clement (USA)	48.11		1
Silver medal	L.J. van Zyl (RSA)	48.74		2
Bronze medal	Periklís Iakovákis (GRE)	48.90		13
4	Michael Tinsley (USA)	49.03		9
5	Rhys Williams (GBR)	50.02		15
6	Danny McFarlane (JAM)	50.28		5
7	Justin Gaymon (USA)	51.19		7
	Isa Phillips (JAM)	DQ		3

Women's
Rank	Athlete	Time (sec)	Notes	WAT rank
Gold medal	Melaine Walker (JAM)	53.36	CR	1
Silver medal	Kaliese Spencer (JAM)	53.99		8
Bronze medal	Josanne Lucas (TRI)	54.31		6
4	Angela Moroșanu (ROU)	54.62		7
5	Anna Jesień (POL)	54.98		2
6	Sheena Tosta (USA)	55.31		4
7	Tiffany Williams (USA)	56.29		3
	Lashinda Demus (USA)	DNF		5

=== 3000 metres steeplechase ===
Men's
Rank	Athlete	Time (min)	Notes	WAT rank
Gold medal	Ezekiel Kemboi (KEN)	8:04.38		1
Silver medal	Paul Kipsiele Koech (KEN)	8:05.47		2
Bronze medal	Bouabdellah Tahri (FRA)	8:09.14		20
4	Roba Gary (ETH)	8:11.32	NR	10
5	Jukka Keskisalo (FIN)	8:12.04		5
6	Brimin Kipruto (KEN)	8:16.44		7
7	Michael Kipyego (KEN)	8:17.46		3
8	Richard Mateelong (KEN)	8:18.83		9
9	Abel Kiprop Mutai (KEN)	8:24.11		6
10	Wesley Kiprotich (KEN)	8:24.95		8
11	Elijah Chelimo Kipterege (KEN)	8:32.76		10
12	Tareq Mubarak Taher (BHR)	8:36.99		4

Women's
Rank	Athlete	Time (min)	Notes	WAT rank
Gold medal	Ruth Bisibori Nyangau (KEN)	9:13.43	CR	1
Silver medal	Milcah Chemos Cheywa (KEN)	9:20.19		20
Bronze medal	Gladys Jerotich Kipkemoi (KEN)	9:21.18		13
4	Sofia Assefa (ETH)	9:26.10		2
5	Lydia Jebet Rotich (KEN)	9:26.94		10
6	Sophie Duarte (FRA)	9:27.78		8
7	Lisa Galaviz (USA)	9:33.11	SB	6
8	Katarzyna Kowalska (POL)	9:37.86		7
9	Ancuța Bobocel (ROU)	9:39.92		10
10	Mekdes Bekele (ETH)	9:55.33		4
11	Iríni Kokkinaríou (GRE)	9:58.38		16
	Habiba Ghribi (TUN)	DNF		4

== Field ==
Events
High jump	Pole vault	Long jump	Triple jump	Shot put	Discus	Hammer	Javelin

=== High jump ===
Men's
Rank	Athlete	Best (m)	Notes	WAT rank
Gold medal	Yaroslav Rybakov (RUS)	2.34		6
Silver medal	Jaroslav Bába (CZE)	2.32		1
Bronze medal	Jesse Williams (USA)	2.29		2
4	Andra Manson (USA)	2.29		5
5	Ivan Ukhov (RUS)	2.26		3
6	Alessandro Talotti (ITA)	2.26	SB	4
7	Kyriakos Ioannou (CYP)	2.22		31
7	Konstadinos Baniotis (GRE)	2.22		—

Women's
Rank	Athlete	Best (m)	Notes	WAT rank
Gold medal	Blanka Vlašić (CRO)	2.04	CR	1
Silver medal	Anna Chicherova (RUS)	2.00		2
Bronze medal	Antonietta Di Martino (ITA)	1.97		5
4	Chaunte Howard Lowe (USA)	1.97		3
5	Irina Gordeeva (RUS)	1.94		10
6	Svetlana Shkolina (RUS)	1.94		7
7	Ruth Beitia (ESP)	1.90		3
8	Viktoriya Klyugina (RUS)	1.90		11

=== Pole vault ===
Men's
Rank	Athlete	Best (m)	Notes	WAT rank
Gold medal	Maksym Mazuryk (UKR)	5.70		4
Silver medal	Derek Miles (USA)	5.60		3
Bronze medal	Damiel Dossévi (FRA)	5.60		7
4	Romain Mesnil (FRA)	5.50		5
4	Viktor Chistiakov (RUS)	5.50		8
6	Konstadinos Filippidis (GRE)	5.50		—
6	Jeremy Scott (USA)	5.50		6
	Renaud Lavillenie (FRA)	NM		2

Women's
Rank	Athlete	Best (m)	Notes	WAT rank
Gold medal	Elena Isinbaeva (RUS)	4.80		1
Silver medal	Fabiana Murer (BRA)	4.60		5
Silver medal	Monika Pyrek (POL)	4.60		3
4	Anna Rogowska (POL)	4.50		2
4	Yuliya Golubchikova (RUS)	4.50		7
6	Silke Spiegelburg (GER)	4.40		4
	Aleksandra Kiryashova (RUS)	NM		9
	Chelsea Johnson (USA)	NM		8

=== Long jump ===
Men's
Rank	Athlete	Best (m)	Notes	WAT rank
Gold medal	Fabrice Lapierre (AUS)	8.33	w	3
Silver medal	Dwight Phillips (USA)	8.24		2
Bronze medal	Godfrey Khotso Mokoena (RSA)	8.17		1
4	Ndiss Kaba Badji (SEN)	7.96		6
5	Salim Sdiri (FRA)	7.90		5
6	Nils Winter (GER)	7.89		39
7	Chris Tomlinson (GBR)	7.85		4
8	Roman Novotný (CZE)	7.64		16

Women's
Rank	Athlete	Best (m)	Notes	WAT rank
Gold medal	Brittney Reese (USA)	7.08	CR	2
Silver medal	Yelena Sokolova (RUS)	6.81		6
Bronze medal	Tatyana Lebedeva (RUS)	6.79		9
4	Olga Kucherenko (RUS)	6.61		7
5	Ksenija Balta (EST)	6.58		3
6	Funmi Jimoh (USA)	6.58		1
7	Keila Costa (BRA)	6.53		5
8	Irina Meleshina (RUS)	6.50		15

=== Triple jump ===
Men's
Rank	Athlete	Best (m)	Notes	WAT rank
Gold medal	Arnie David Girat (CUB)	17.45		1
Silver medal	Leevan Sands (BAH)	17.19		2
Bronze medal	Momchil Karailiev (BUL)	17.18		5
4	Phillips Idowu (GBR)	17.03		3
5	Fabrizio Schembri (ITA)	16.78		12
6	Brandon Roulhac (USA)	16.73		4
7	Randy Lewis (GRN)	16.46		8
8	Jadel Gregório (BRA)	15.38		7

Women's
Rank	Athlete	Best (m)	Notes	WAT rank
Gold medal	Mabel Gay (CUB)	14.62		6
Silver medal	Biljana Topić (SRB)	14.56	NR	10
Bronze medal	Tatyana Lebedeva (RUS)	14.48	SB	4
4	Yamilé Aldama (SUD)	14.39		2
5	Dana Velďáková (SVK)	14.38		5
6	Anna Pyatykh (RUS)	14.33		3
7	Trecia Smith (JAM)	13.89		7
8	Teresa Nzola Meso (FRA)	13.64		12

=== Shot put ===
Men's
Rank	Athlete	Best (m)	Notes	WAT rank
Gold medal	Christian Cantwell (USA)	22.07	CR	3
Silver medal	Tomasz Majewski (POL)	21.21		2
Bronze medal	Pavel Sofin (RUS)	20.82	PB	6
4	Reese Hoffa (USA)	20.66		1
5	Ralf Bartels (GER)	20.58		14
6	Andrei Mikhnevich (BLR)	20.48		4
7	Adam Nelson (USA)	20.03		6
8	Dylan Armstrong (CAN)	19.61		5

Women's
Rank	Athlete	Best (m)	Notes	WAT rank
Gold medal	Valerie Vili (NZL)	21.07	CR	4
Silver medal	Nadzeya Ostapchuk (BLR)	19.56		6
Bronze medal	Natallia Mikhnevich (BLR)	19.27		3
4	Nadine Kleinert (GER)	19.05		1
5	Michelle Carter (USA)	19.05		2
6	Misleydis González (CUB)	18.45		6
7	Denise Hinrichs (GER)	17.91		5
8	Anca Heltne (ROU)	17.68		8

=== Discus throw ===
Men's
Rank	Athlete	Best (m)	Notes	WAT rank
Gold medal	Virgilijus Alekna (LTU)	67.63		3
Silver medal	Robert Harting (GER)	66.37		4
Bronze medal	Piotr Małachowski (POL)	65.60		2
4	Zoltán Kövágó (HUN)	65.60		5
5	Gerd Kanter (EST)	65.34		1
6	Yennifer Frank Casañas (ESP)	63.24		5
7	Omar Ahmed El Ghazaly (EGY)	61.95		8
8	Märt Israel (EST)	48.61		7

Women's
Rank	Athlete	Best (m)	Notes	WAT rank
Gold medal	Yarelis Barrios (CUB)	65.86	CR	1
Silver medal	Żaneta Glanc (POL)	63.36		6
Bronze medal	Mélina Robert-Michon (FRA)	61.74		9
4	Nicoleta Grasu (ROU)	61.57		3
5	Dani Samuels (AUS)	59.94		8
6	Stephanie Brown Trafton (USA)	59.66		5
7	Aretha Thurmond (USA)	59.64		6
8	Sandra Perković (CRO)	54.87		31

=== Hammer throw ===
Men's
Rank	Athlete	Best (m)	Notes	WAT rank
Gold medal	Primož Kozmus (SLO)	79.80		2
Silver medal	Igors Sokolovs (LAT)	79.32		5
Bronze medal	Krisztián Pars (HUN)	77.49		1
4	Aleksey Zagornyi (RUS)	77.26		4
5	Dilshod Nazarov (TJK)	77.14		3
6	Szymon Ziółkowski (POL)	76.96		7
7	András Haklits (CRO)	75.35		7
8	Ali Al-Zinkawi (KUW)	73.61		6

Women's
Rank	Athlete	Best (m)	Notes	WAT rank
Gold medal	Betty Heidler (GER)	72.03		5
Silver medal	Clarissa Claretti (ITA)	70.56		3
Bronze medal	Martina Hrasnová (SVK)	70.45		2
4	Kathrin Klaas (GER)	69.50		10
5	Darya Pchelnik (BLR)	69.00		7
6	Sultana Frizell (CAN)	68.07		4
7	Marina Marghiev (MDA)	65.29		5
8	Stilianí Papadopoúlou (GRE)	64.90		—

=== Javelin throw ===
Men's
Rank	Athlete	Best (m)	Notes	WAT rank
Gold medal	Andreas Thorkildsen (NOR)	87.75		1
Silver medal	Tero Pitkämäki (FIN)	84.09		2
Bronze medal	Mark Frank (GER)	82.46		6
4	Vadims Vasiļevskis (LAT)	81.86		3
5	Oleksandr Pyatnytsya (UKR)	80.60		7
6	Teemu Wirkkala (FIN)	80.50		3
7	Ainārs Kovals (LAT)	80.07		8
8	Ēriks Rags (LAT)	74.93		5

Women's
Rank	Athlete	Best (m)	Notes	WAT rank
Gold medal	Maria Abakumova (RUS)	64.60		4
Silver medal	Barbora Špotáková (CZE)	63.45		2
Bronze medal	Steffi Nerius (GER)	62.59		1
4	Christina Obergföll (GER)	62.14		6
5	Osleidys Menéndez (CUB)	59.93		7
6	Kimberley Mickle (AUS)	57.57		3
7	Monica Stoian (ROU)	57.32		4
8	Martina Ratej (SLO)	56.21		12
