= Lina Jacques-Sébastien =

French sprinter (born 1985)

Medal record

Representing France

Women's athletics

European Championships
Silver medal – second place	2010 Barcelona	4 × 100 m relay

Mediterranean Games
Silver medal – second place	2005 Almería	200 metres

European U23 Championships
Gold medal – first place	2005 Erfurt	4 × 100 m relay
Silver medal – second place	2005 Erfurt	100 m

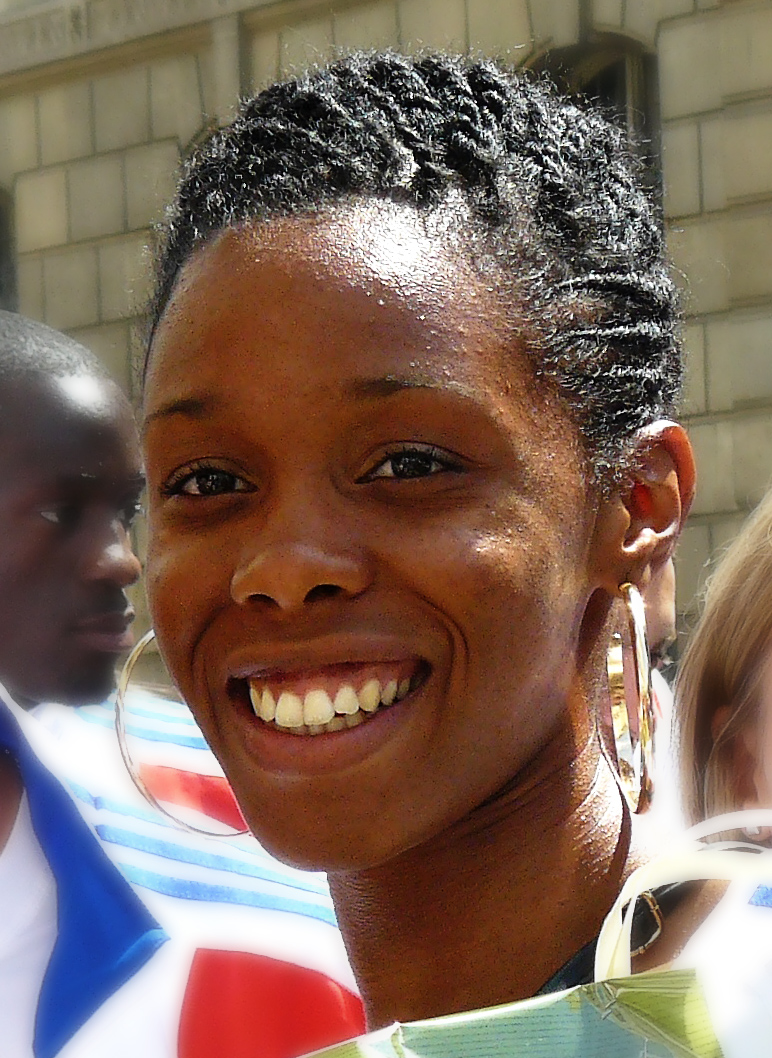

Lina Jacques-Sébastien (born 10 April 1985 in Créteil, France) is a French sprint athlete who specializes in the 100 metres and 200 metres.

== Biography ==
She finished sixth in the 100 metres at the 2004 World Junior Championships, and also won a bronze medal in the 4 × 100 metres relay. She won the silver medal in the 100 metres at the 2005 European U23 Championships, and in the 200 metres at the 2005 Mediterranean Games. She competed at the 2005 European Indoor Championships and the 2009 European Indoor Championships without reaching the final.

In the 4 × 100 metres relay she finished fourth at the 2005 World Championships. She also competed at the 2008 Olympic Games together with Muriel Hurtis-Houairi, Myriam Soumaré and Carima Louami, but in their first round heat they did not finish and were eliminated due to a mistake with the baton exchange. Jacques-Sebastien later won a silver medal at the 2009 Jeux de la Francophonie.

Her personal best times are 7.35 seconds in the 60 metres (indoor), achieved in February 2008 in Bordeaux; 11.30 seconds in the 100 metres, achieved in June 2008 in Sotteville-lès-Rouen; and 22.59 seconds in the 200 metres, achieved at the 2010 European Championships in Barcelona.

== Achievements ==
Year	Competition	Venue	Position	Event	Notes
Representing France
2003	European Junior Championships	Tampere, Finland	11th (h)	100 m	11.91
2003	European Junior Championships	Tampere, Finland	1st	4 × 100 m relay	44.60
2004	World Junior Championships	Grosseto, Italy	6th	100m	11.58 (wind: +1.5 m/s)
2004	World Junior Championships	Grosseto, Italy	3rd	4 × 100 m relay	43.68
2005	European Indoor Championships	Madrid, Spain	5th (sf)	200 m	23.49
2005	Mediterranean Games	Almería, Spain	2nd	200 m	23.75
2005	Mediterranean Games	Almería, Spain	1st	4 × 100 m relay	43.75
2005	European U23 Championships	Erfurt, Germany	2nd	100m	11.46 (wind: +1.5 m/s)
2005	European U23 Championships	Erfurt, Germany	6th	200m	23.91 (wind: +0.7 m/s)
2005	European U23 Championships	Erfurt, Germany	1st	4 × 100 m relay	44.22
2005	World Championships	Helsinki, Finland	4th	4 × 100 m relay	42.85
2007	Universiade	Bangkok, Thailand	12th (sf)	100 m	11.98
2009	European Indoor Championships	Turin, Italy	18th (h)	60 m	7.43
2009	Jeux de la Francophonie	Beirut, Lebanon	6th	200 m	24.80
2009	Jeux de la Francophonie	Beirut, Lebanon	2nd	4 × 100 m relay	45.19
2010	European Championships	Barcelona, Spain	5th	200 m	22.59
2010	European Championships	Barcelona, Spain	2nd	4 × 100 m relay	42.45
2011	World Championships	Daegu, South Korea	5th	4 × 100 m relay	42.70
