= LaVerne Jones-Ferrette =

United States Virgin Islands sprinter

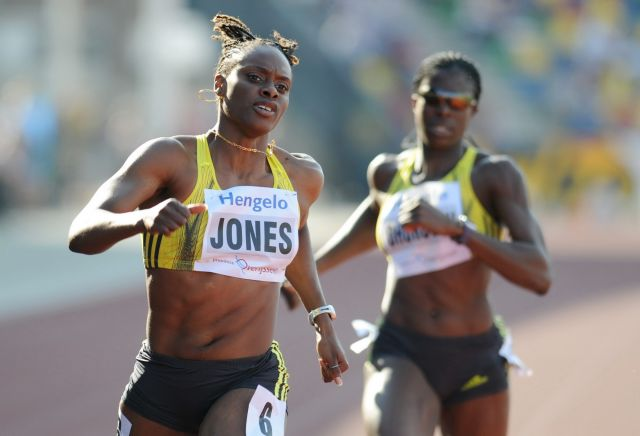

Personal information
- Full name: Coach Jones
- Born: Frederiksted, Saint Croix, United States Virgin Islands
- Height: 1.73 m (5 ft 8 in)
- Weight: 66 kg (146 lb)

Sport
- Country: United States Virgin Islands
- Sport: Athletics
- Event: Sprint
Medal record
Women's athletics
Representing the United States Virgin Islands
World Indoor Championships
Disqualified	2010 Doha	60 m
CAC Games
Silver medal – second place	2006 Cartagena	100 m
- Updated on 28 December 2014

LaVerne Janet Jones-Ferrette (born September 16, 1981) is a sprinter from the United States Virgin Islands who specializes in the 100 and 200 meters. She represented her country at the Summer Olympics in 2004, 2008 and 2012. She won the silver medal over 60 meters at the 2010 IAAF World Indoor Championships in a time of 6.97 seconds; a subsequent drug test revealed a banned substance in her system and she was stripped of her medal.

Jones-Ferrette competed at the World Championships in Athletics in 2005, 2007 and 2009, but did not reach an event final on any of those occasions. Her first international medal came at the 2006 Central American and Caribbean Games, where she was the 100 m silver medalist. She represented her country at the 2007 Pan American Games. She holds all the US Virgin Islands records for the sprint events from 60 to 400 meters.

== Career ==
She grew up on Saint Croix and later moved to the United States on an athletic scholarship. She attended Barton County Community College and was coached by Lance Brauman, who also coached Tyson Gay and Veronica Campbell. She attended the University of Oklahoma and represented the Oklahoma Sooners in the NCAA Championships before graduating in 2003. She made her Olympic debut at the 2004 Athens Olympics, reaching the second round in both the 100 m and 200 m. She was one of only two athletes from the country to compete in the athletics competition that year and was chosen to be the 2004 Olympic flag bearer for the US Virgin Islands.

She came fourth in the 100 m at the 2005 CAC Championships and ran at the 2005 World Championships in Athletics later that season, reaching the semi-finals of the 200 m. She also reached the semi-final stage of the 60 m at the 2006 IAAF World Indoor Championships. At the 2006 Central American and Caribbean Games she entered both the 100 m and 200 m – she just missed out on a medal in the 200 m, finishing fourth, but was the runner-up in the 100 m, taking the silver medal behind Tahesia Harrigan. In 2007, she competed at the Pan American Games for the first time and was seventh in the women's 100 m final. She reached the 200 m semis for a second time running at the World Championships in Osaka.

Jones-Ferrette represented the US Virgin Islands at the 2008 Summer Olympics in Beijing competing at the 100 metres sprint. In her first round heat she placed third behind Kerron Stewart and Ezinne Okparaebo in a time of 11.41 to advance to the second round. There she failed to qualify for the semi-finals as her time of 11.55 was only the fifth time of her heat, causing elimination.

She further improved her 100 and 200 meter national records at the Grande Prêmio Brasil Caixa meeting in May 2009. Breaking both records in just over an hour, she ran 11.18 in the 100 m and 22.49 seconds in the 200 m. She competed at the 2009 World Championships in Athletics but she just missed out on making the 200 metres final. She ended the year with seventh-place finishes in the sprints at the 2009 IAAF World Athletics Final.

Jones-Ferrette made a strong start to 2010, building up to the 2010 IAAF World Indoor Championships by running the fastest 60 m time recorded in eleven years. Her time of 6.97 seconds made her the sixth fastest woman over the distance and even she was surprised to have run such a quick time. An absence from competition that summer was later explained when she announced that she and her husband, Stephen Ferrette, were expecting a child. However, on December 16, 2010, it was made public that she was banned from competition for 6 months from April to October of the same year due to a positive test of a banned substance, as well as had her world indoor medal stripped. She stated though that the substance was used to help her fertility.

She competed at the 2012 Summer Olympics, finishing in 9th in the 200 m and in 14th in the 100 m, not qualifying for either final.

== Competition record ==
Year	Competition	Venue	Position	Event	Notes
Representing the United States Virgin Islands
1999	CARIFTA Games (U20)	Fort-de-France, Martinique	—	100 m	DNF
2000	Central American and Caribbean Junior Championships (U20)	San Juan, Puerto Rico	4th (h)	200 m	25.07 w (wind: +3.9 m/s)
2000	Central American and Caribbean Junior Championships (U20)	San Juan, Puerto Rico	4th	4 × 400 m relay	3:55.13
2003	CAC Championships	St George's, Grenada	8th	100 m	11.63 (wind: +0.6 m/s)
2004	Olympic Games	Athens, Greece	6th (second round)	100 m	11.44 (wind: +0.2 m/s)
2004	Olympic Games	Athens, Greece	6th (second round)	200 m	23.09 (wind: +0.3 m/s)
2005	CAC Championships	Nassau, Bahamas	4th	100 m	11.45 (wind: +1.1 m/s)
2005	CAC Championships	Nassau, Bahamas	6th	200 m	23.15 w (wind: +3.8 m/s)
2005	World Championships	Helsinki, Finland	21st (qf)	100 m	11.51 (wind: -0.1 m/s)
2005	World Championships	Helsinki, Finland	7th (semis)	200 m	23.62 (wind: -4.0 m/s)
2005	Universiade	İzmir, Turkey	10th (sf)	100 m	11.92 (wind: +0.6 m/s)
2005	Universiade	İzmir, Turkey	7th	200 m	24.00 (wind: -1.0 m/s)
2006	World Indoor Championships	Moscow, Russia	11th (sf)	60 m	7.27
2006	Central American and Caribbean Games	Cartagena, Colombia	2nd	100 m	11.50 (wind: +0.5 m/s)
2006	Central American and Caribbean Games	Cartagena, Colombia	4th	200 m	23.33 (wind: -0.4 m/s)
2007	Pan American Games	Rio de Janeiro, Brazil	7th	100 m	11.49 (wind: +0.8 m/s)
2007	Pan American Games	Rio de Janeiro, Brazil	7th	400 m	52.97
2007	World Championships	Osaka, Japan	8th (semis)	200 m	23.34 (wind: -0.4 m/s)
2008	World Indoor Championships	Valencia, Spain	3rd (semis)	60 m	7.24
2008	Olympic Games	Beijing, China	29th (qf)	100 m	11.55 (wind: +0.1 m/s)
2008	Olympic Games	Beijing, China	24th (qf)	200 m	23.37 (wind: 0.0 m/s)
2009	World Championships	Berlin, Germany	9th (sf)	200 m	22.74 (wind: +0.3 m/s)
2009	World Athletics Final	Thessaloniki, Greece	7th	100 m	11.25 (wind: -0.1 m/s)
2009	World Athletics Final	Thessaloniki, Greece	7th	200 m	22.90 (wind: +0.1 m/s)
2010	World Indoor Championships	Doha, Qatar	2nd (disqualified)	60 m	DSQ
2011	Pan American Games	Guadalajara, Mexico	8th	100 m	11.60 A (wind: -0.2 m/s)
2012	World Indoor Championships	Istanbul, Turkey	1st (h)^{1}	60 m	7.21
2012	Olympic Games	London, United Kingdom	4th (sf)	100 m	11.22 (wind: 0.0 m/s)
2012	Olympic Games	London, United Kingdom	4th (sf)	200 m	22.62 (wind: +1.0 m/s)
2014	World Indoor Championships	Sopot, Poland	28th (h)	60 m	7.39
2014	Central American and Caribbean Games	Xalapa, Mexico	3rd	100m	11.54 A (wind: +1.5 m/s)
2015	NACAC Championships	San José, Costa Rica	7th	100m	11.53 (wind: -0.1 m/s)
2015	NACAC Championships	San José, Costa Rica	8th	200m	23.51 (wind: +1.3 m/s)
2015	World Championships	Beijing, China	47th (h)	200 m	23.83
2016	Olympic Games	Rio de Janeiro, Brazil	6th (h)	200 m	23.35 (wind: +0.5 m/s)

== Personal bests ==
- 60 meters - 6.97 s (2010) - national record.
- 100 meters - 11.07 s (2012) - national record.
- 200 meters - 22.46 s (2009) - national record.
- 400 meters - 51.47 s (2007) - national record.
