= 2003 European Athletics U23 Championships – Women's 200 metres =

The women's 200 metres event at the 2003 European Athletics U23 Championships was held in Bydgoszcz, Poland, at Zawisza Stadion on 18 and 20 July.

== Medalists ==
Gold	Maryna Maydanova; Ukraine
Silver	Maja Nose; Slovenia
Bronze	Dorota Dydo; Poland

== Results ==
=== Final ===
20 July
Wind: 1.0 m/s

Rank	Name	Nationality	Time	Notes
1st place, gold medalist(s)	Maryna Maydanova	Ukraine	22.82	
2nd place, silver medalist(s)	Maja Nose	Slovenia	23.09	
3rd place, bronze medalist(s)	Dorota Dydo	Poland	23.34	
4	Vincenza Calì	Italy	23.55	
5	Yuliya Gushchina	Russia	23.59	
6	Nikolett Listár	Hungary	23.68	
7	Danielle Norville	United Kingdom	23.69	
8	Audrey Rochtus	Belgium	24.11	

=== Heats ===
18 July
Qualified: first 3 in each heat and 2 best to the Final

==== Heat 1 ====
Wind: 1.9 m/s

Rank	Name	Nationality	Time	Notes
1	Maryna Maydanova	Ukraine	23.16	Q
2	Dorota Dydo	Poland	23.66	Q
3	Vincenza Calì	Italy	23.69	Q
4	Nikolett Listár	Hungary	23.83	q
5	Audrey Rochtus	Belgium	24.23.	q

==== Heat 2 ====
Wind: 1.8 m/s

Rank	Name	Nationality	Time	Notes
1	Yuliya Gushchina	Russia	23.93	Q
2	Maja Nose	Slovenia	24.02	Q
3	Danielle Norville	United Kingdom	24.14	Q
4	Natalia Losange	France	24.30	
5	Olena Chebanu	Ukraine	24.37	

== Participation ==
According to an unofficial count, 10 athletes from 9 countries participated in the event.

- Belgium (1)
- France (1)
- Hungary (1)
- Italy (1)
- Poland (1)
- Russia (1)
- Slovenia (1)
- Ukraine (2)
- United Kingdom (1)
