= 2005 World Championships in Athletics – Women's 200 metres =

Video on YouTube Official video

The women's 200 metres at the 2005 World Championships in Athletics was held on August 10, 11 and 12 at the Helsinki Olympic Stadium.

Olympic gold medalist Veronica Campbell, Christine Arron and Kim Gevaert were the early leaders out of the blocks. The powerful Campbell ran on the outside of her lane 7 and into the lane of Yulia Gushchina though she was so far ahead of Gushchina that she wasn't in danger of interfering. Arron held the lead as Gevaert faded from contention. Teenage sensation and Olympic silver medalist, Allyson Felix was more than a stride behind and slightly behind her was Rachelle Boone-Smith. While Campbell corrected her heading, Felix began to go by, gaining on Arron. Felix went by Arron and on to the win showing little strain. Arron and Campbell strained to get to the line against each other. Virtually unnoticed, Boone-Smith gained steadily and was able to nip both of them at the line with Arron holding on to beat Campbell for bronze.

== Medals ==
Gold:	Silver:	Bronze:
Allyson Felix (United States)	Rachelle Boone-Smith (United States)	Christine Arron (France)

== Results ==
All times shown are in seconds.

AR area record | CR championship record | GR games record | NR national record | OR Olympic record | PB personal best | SB season best | WL world leading (in a given season)
DNS = did not start | DQ = disqualification | NM = no mark (i.e. no valid result) | Q = qualification by place in heat | q = qualification by overall place

=== Heats ===
August 10, 2005

==== Heat 1 ====
1. (Cayman Islands) Cydonie Mothersill 23.72 Q
2. (United States) LaTasha Colander 23.89 Q
3. (United States Virgin Islands) LaVerne Jones-Ferrette 24.12 Q
4. (Australia) Lauren Hewitt 24.20
5. (Jamaica) Sheri-Ann Brooks 24.20
6. (Russia) Yelena Bolsun 24.30
7. (Austria) Karin Mayr-Krifka 24.61

==== Heat 2 ====
1. (Russia) Yulia Gushchina 22.53 Q (PB)
2. (United States) Allyson Felix 22.68 Q
3. (Belgium) Kim Gevaert 22.78 Q
4. (Belarus) Natallia Solohub 23.16 q
5. (Ukraine) Maryna Maydanova 23.31 q
6. (Costa Rica) Tracy Joseph Hamblet 24.84 (PB)
7. (Equatorial Guinea) Gertrudis Luna 26.28 (NR)

==== Heat 3 ====
1. (Benin) Fabienne Féraez 23.72 Q
2. (Russia) Irina Khabarova 23.78 Q
3. (United States) Rachelle Boone-Smith 23.78 Q
4. (The Bahamas) Christine Amertil 23.88
5. (Ghana) Vida Anim 24.16
6. (Papua New Guinea) Mae Koime 25.31
7. (Eswatini) Gcinile Moyane 27.79 (SB)

==== Heat 4 ====
1. (France) Christine Arron 22.89 Q
2. (Jamaica) Veronica Campbell-Brown 23.28 Q
3. (Brazil) Lucimar Aparecida de Moura 23.36 Q
4. (South Africa) Geraldine Pillay 23.58 q
5. (Slovenia) Alenka Bikar 23.77 q
6. (Nigeria) Mercy Nku 23.99

=== Semifinals ===
August 11, 2005

==== Heat 1 ====
1. (France) Christine Arron 22.45 Q
2. (United States) Rachelle Boone-Smith 22.69 Q
3. (United States) LaTasha Colander 22.69 Q
4. (Cayman Islands) Cydonie Mothersill 23.13 Q
5. (Russia) Irina Khabarova 23.26
6. (Brazil) Lucimar Aparecida de Moura 23.42
7. (Ukraine) Maryna Maydanova 23.78
8. (South Africa) Geraldine Pillay 24.22

==== Heat 2 ====
1. (United States) Allyson Felix 22.90 Q
2. (Belgium) Kim Gevaert 22.97 Q
3. (Jamaica) Veronica Campbell-Brown 23.02 Q
4. (Russia) Yulia Gushchina 23.10 Q
5. (Benin) Fabienne Féraez 23.29
6. (Belarus) Natallia Solohub 23.62
7. (United States Virgin Islands) LaVerne Jones-Ferrette 23.62
8. (Slovenia) Alenka Bikar 23.94

=== Final ===
August 12, 2005

1. (United States) Allyson Felix 22.16
2. (United States) Rachelle Boone-Smith 22.31
3. (France) Christine Arron 22.31 (SB)
4. (Jamaica) Veronica Campbell-Brown 22.38
5. (United States) LaTasha Colander 22.66
6. (Russia) Yulia Gushchina 22.75
7. (Belgium) Kim Gevaert 22.86
8. (Cayman Islands) Cydonie Mothersill 23.00
