= 2005 European Athletics U23 Championships – Women's 200 metres =

The women's 200 metres event at the 2005 European Athletics U23 Championships was held in Erfurt, Germany, at Steigerwaldstadion on 15 and 17 July 2005.

== Medalists ==
Gold	Yelena Yakovleva; Russia
Silver	Nikolett Listár; Hungary
Bronze	Vincenza Calì; Italy

== Results ==
=== Final ===
17 July 2005
Wind: 0.7 m/s

Rank	Name	Nationality	Time	Notes
1st place, gold medalist(s)	Yelena Yakovleva	Russia	22.99	
2nd place, silver medalist(s)	Nikolett Listár	Hungary	23.19	
3rd place, bronze medalist(s)	Vincenza Calì	Italy	23.31	
4	Olha Andreyeva	Ukraine	23.62	
5	Anna Boyle	Ireland	23.78	
6	Lina Jacques-Sébastien	France	23.91	
7	Aurélie Kamga	France	24.15	
8	Eleftheria Kobidou	Greece	24.20	

=== Heats ===
15 July 2005
Qualified: first 3 in each heat and 2 best to the Final

==== Heat 1 ====
Wind: -1.5 m/s

Rank	Name	Nationality	Time	Notes
1	Yelena Yakovleva	Russia	23.06	Q
2	Nikolett Listár	Hungary	23.45	Q
3	Anna Boyle	Ireland	24.02	Q
4	Lina Jacques-Sébastien	France	24.02	q
5	Anyika Onuora	United Kingdom	24.29	
6	Nastassia Shuliak	Belarus	24.41	
7	Yana Kolpakova	Azerbaijan	26.29	

==== Heat 2 ====
Wind: 1.4 m/s

Rank	Name	Nationality	Time	Notes
1	Vincenza Calì	Italy	23.55	Q
2	Olha Andreyeva	Ukraine	23.67	Q
3	Aurélie Kamga	France	23.99	Q
4	Eleftheria Kobidou	Greece	24.27	q
5	Ayodelé Ikuesan	France	24.28	

== Participation ==
According to an unofficial count, 12 athletes from 10 countries participated in the event.

- Azerbaijan (1)
- Belarus (1)
- France (3)
- Greece (1)
- Hungary (1)
- Ireland (1)
- Italy (1)
- Russia (1)
- Ukraine (1)
- United Kingdom (1)
