= Kristina Žumer =

Slovenian sprinter

Personal information
- Born: 2 February 1980

Sport
- Sport: Athletics
- Event: 100 m

Kristina Žumer (born 2 February 1980) is a Slovenian retired sprinter. She represented her country in the 4 × 100 meters relay at the 2003 World Championships. In addition she won a bronze medal in the 100 metres at the 2005 Mediterranean Games.

== International competitions ==
Year	Competition	Venue	Position	Event	Notes
Representing Slovenia
2003	World Championships	Paris, France	–	4 × 100 m relay	DQ
2005	European Indoor Championships	Madrid, Spain	13th (h)	200 m	24.00
2005	Mediterranean Games	Almería, Spain	3rd	100 m	11.63
2005	Mediterranean Games	Almería, Spain	5th	200 m	23.93
2005	Universiade	İzmir, Turkey	9th (sf)	100 m	11.89
2005	Universiade	İzmir, Turkey	17th (h)	200 m	24.22
2006	European Championships	Gothenburg, Sweden	25th (h)	100 m	11.69
2006	European Championships	Gothenburg, Sweden	19th (h)	200 m	23.63
2010	European Championships	Barcelona, Spain	12th (h)	4 × 100 m relay	44.30
2012	European Championships	Helsinki, Finland	21st (sf)	200 m	24.20
2012	European Championships	Helsinki, Finland	11th (h)	4 × 100 m relay	44.28
2013	Mediterranean Games	Mersin, Turkey	9th (h)	100 m	11.89
2013	Mediterranean Games	Mersin, Turkey	7th	200 m	23.75
2014	European Championships	Zurich, Switzerland	33rd (h)	100 m	11.85
2014	European Championships	Zurich, Switzerland	31st (h)	200 m	24.24

== Personal bests ==
Outdoor

- 100 metres – 11.50 (+0.5 m/s, Kaunas 2013)
- 200 metres – 23.51 (+0.8 m/s, Celje 2013)
- 400 metres – 55.22 (Sestriere 2004)
- Long jump – 6.52 (+1.7 m/s, Dolenjske Toplice 2003)
- Triple jump – 13.19 (Celje 2003)

Indoor

- 60 metres – 7.42 (Vienna 2004)
- 200 metres – 23.98 (Vienna 2012)
- Long jump – 6.39 (Ljubljana 2003)
