= Kerron Stewart =

Jamaican sprinter

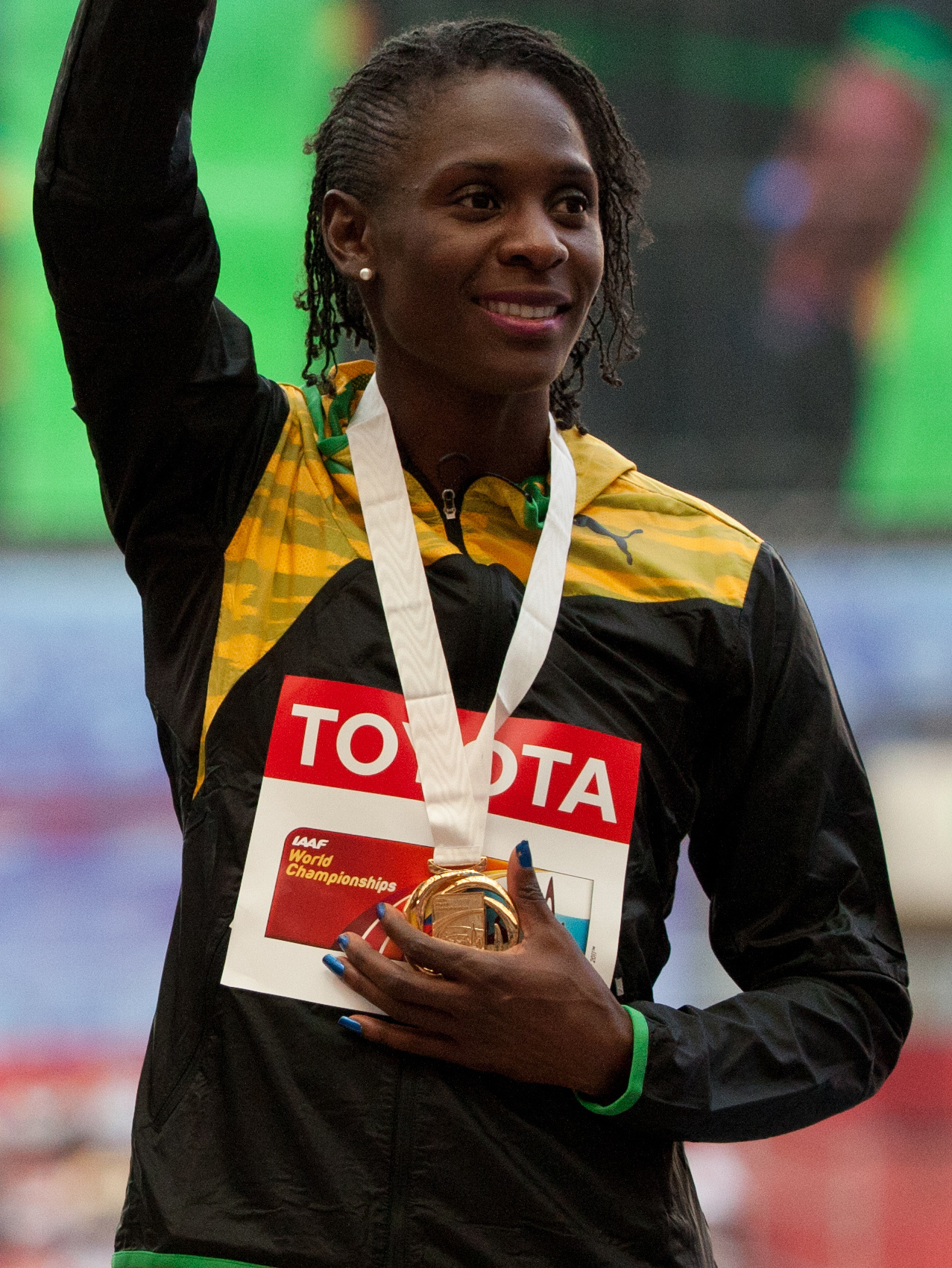

Personal information
- Born: 16 April 1984 (age 42) Kingston, Jamaica
- Height: 175 cm (5 ft 9 in)
- Weight: 61 kg (134 lb)

Sport
- Sport: Athletics
- Event: Sprints
- Coached by: Henry Rolle
Medal record
Women's athletics
Representing Jamaica
Olympic Games
Silver medal – second place	2008 Beijing	100 m
Silver medal – second place	2012 London	4 × 100 m relay
Bronze medal – third place	2008 Beijing	200 m
World Championships
Gold medal – first place	2009 Berlin	4 × 100 m relay
Gold medal – first place	2013 Moscow	4 × 100 m relay
Gold medal – first place	2015 Beijing	4 × 100 m relay
Silver medal – second place	2007 Osaka	4 × 100 m relay
Silver medal – second place	2009 Berlin	100 m
Silver medal – second place	2011 Daegu	4 × 100 m relay
World Relay Championships
Silver medal – second place	2014 Nassau	4 × 100 m relay
World Athletics Final
Silver medal – second place	2008 Stuttgart	100 m
Bronze medal – third place	2008 Stuttgart	200 m
Bronze medal – third place	2009 Thessaloniki	100 m
Bronze medal – third place	2009 Thessaloniki	200 m
World Junior Championships
Gold medal – first place	2002 Kingston	4 × 100 m relay
Silver medal – second place	2000 Santiago	4 × 100 m relay
World Youth Championships
Silver medal – second place	2001 Hungary	100 m
CAC Junior Championships (U17)
Gold medal – first place	2000 San Juan	4 × 100 m relay
Bronze medal – third place	2000 San Juan	100 m
Bronze medal – third place	2000 San Juan	200 m
CARIFTA Games Junior (U20)
Gold medal – first place	2001 Bridgetown	4 × 100 m relay
Gold medal – first place	2003 Port of Spain	100 m
Gold medal – first place	2003 Port of Spain	4 × 100 m relay
Silver medal – second place	2002 Nassau	100 m
Bronze medal – third place	2003 Port of Spain	200 m
CARIFTA Games Youth (U17)
Gold medal – first place	2000 St. George's	100 m
Bronze medal – third place	2000 St. George's	300 m hurdles

Kerron Stewart (born 16 April 1984) is a retired Jamaican sprinter who specialized in the 100 metres and 200 metres. She is the 2008 Jamaican national champion in the 100 m clocking 10.80s. She defeated World Champion Veronica Campbell-Brown in the process and now is the 2008 Summer Olympics silver medalist after she tied with Sherone Simpson in a time of 10.98s. She also earned a bronze medal in the 200 metres at the 2008 Summer Olympics with a time of 22.00s. She was born in Kingston and retired after the 2018 season.

Stewart holds one of the fastest non-winning times for the women's 100 metres. In the 2009 World Athletics Championships from Berlin, she ran 10.75 seconds only to finish second to compatriot, Shelly-Ann Fraser-Pryce who ran a 10.73 race. Stewart also anchored the Jamaican 4 × 100 m relay team to victory in a time of 42.06.

== Junior career ==
Stewart attended St. Jago High School. She won the U18 100 m at the 2000 Carifta Games. She also represented Jamaica at the World Junior Championships that year, winning a silver medal in the 4 × 100 m relay. In 2001, she finished second in the 200 m at the World Youth Games. In the following year, she finished fourth in the 100 m at the World Junior Championships, and second at the U20 100 m at the 2002 Carifta Games. After winning the U20 100 m, and coming third in the U20 200 m at the 2003 Carifta Games, she was selected for the 2003 Pan American Games, but injured herself in the athlete's village by walking through a plate glass window in the dark, forcing her out of action for three months.

Recovering, she was selected as an alternate for the Jamaican 2004 Olympic team, but did not get to race.

== Auburn University ==
Stewart first competed in the NJCAA for Essex County College and then transferred to Auburn University. She ran for the Auburn Tigers track and field team under coach Henry Rolle at NCCA division I level. She was named 2007 SEC Runner of the Year and USTFCCCA National Runner of the Year after capturing the SEC and NCAA Championships in the 60 m and the 200 m. She was named All-American for seven times and one of the best athlete in the school's history. In 2007, she won the Honda Sports Award as the nation's best female collegiate track and field athlete.

== 2008 Beijing Summer Olympics ==
At the 2008 Summer Olympics in Beijing she competed at the 100 metres sprint. In her first round heat she placed first in front of Ezinne Okparaebo and LaVerne Jones-Ferrette in a time of 11.28 to advance to the second round. There she improved her time to 10.98 seconds to win her heat in front of Lauryn Williams and Kim Gevaert. With 11.05 seconds in her semi final she won the race and earned her spot in the Olympic final. In a remarkable race with fellow Jamaican Shelly-Ann Fraser-Pryce taking the gold, Stewart and Sherone Simpson both finished in 10.98 seconds to share the silver medal and to complete the Jamaican sweep. Together with Fraser, Simpson, Sheri-Ann Brooks, Aleen Bailey and Veronica Campbell-Brown she also took part in the 4 × 100 metres relay. In their first round heat (without Simpson and Stewart) they placed first in front of Russia, Germany and China. Their time of 42.24 seconds was the first time overall out of sixteen participating nations. With this result they qualified for the final in which they replaced Brooks and Bailey with Simpson and Stewart. Eventually they did not finish their race due to a mistake in the baton exchange.

== 2009 World Championships in Athletics ==
Stewart came second in the 100 m at the 2009 Jamaican national championships, finishing in 10.93 s and qualifying for the 2009 World Championships.

At the 2009 IAAF Golden Gala, Stewart won a gold medal in the Women's 100 m in front of Olympic Champion Shelly-Ann Fraser, with a time of 10.75s, which tied the meet record. This was the fastest time in ten years recorded by a woman in the event, and the third-fastest time ever recorded by a Jamaican, shy of Merlene Ottey's 10.74s and Shelly-Ann Fraser's 10.73 national record.

At the 2009 World Championships Kerron Stewart won a silver medal in 100 m just two hundredths of a second behind Jamaican teammate Shelly-Ann Fraser equalling her personal best of 10.75 seconds and ensuring a Jamaican one-two. Stewart did not compete in the 200 m due to an ankle injury, but was anchor for the Jamaican quartet that took gold in the 4 × 100 m Relay.

== 2014 Commonwealth Games ==
Having moved back to Jamaica in 2013 to train under new coach Glenn Mills and help to coach the next generation of Jamaican sprinting talent, she competed at the 2014 Commonwealth Games, winning a bronze medal in the 100 m and a gold medal in the 4 × 100 m (with Veronica Campbell-Brown, Schillonie Calvert and Shelly-Ann Fraser-Pryce) in a games record time.

== Achievements ==
Year	Competition	Venue	Position	Event	Notes
Representing Jamaica
2000	World Junior Championships	Santiago, Chile	2nd	4 × 100 m relay	44.05
2001	World Youth Championships	Debrecen, Hungary	2nd	100 m	11.72 (wind: +0.5 m/s)
2001	World Youth Championships	Debrecen, Hungary	2nd	Medley relay	2:07.45
2002	World Junior Championships	Kingston, Jamaica	4th	100 m	11.53 (wind: -0.2 m/s)
2002	World Junior Championships	Kingston, Jamaica	1st	4 × 100 m relay	43.40
2002	World Junior Championships	Kingston, Jamaica	2nd (h)	4 × 400 m relay	3:32.20
2004	NACAC U-23 Championships	Sherbrooke, Canada	2nd	100 m	11.40 (wind: +0.0 m/s)
2004	NACAC U-23 Championships	Sherbrooke, Canada	5th	200 m	25.18 (wind: -4.0 m/s)
2004	NACAC U-23 Championships	Sherbrooke, Canada	1st	4 × 100 m relay	43.62
2005	Universiade	İzmir, Turkey	18th (qf)	100 m	11.91 (wind: -0.6 m/s)
2005	Universiade	İzmir, Turkey	19th (qf)	200 m	24.26 (wind: -0.1 m/s)
2007	World Championships	Osaka, Japan	7th	100 m	11.12 (wind: -0.2 m/s)
2007	World Championships	Osaka, Japan	2nd	4 × 100 m relay	42.01
2008	Olympic Games	Beijing, China	2nd	100 m	10.98 (wind: +0.0 m/s)
2008	Olympic Games	Beijing, China	3rd	200 m	22.00 (wind: +0.6 m/s)
2008	Olympic Games	Beijing, China	− (f)	4 × 100 m relay	DNF
2008	IAAF World Athletics Final	Stuttgart, Greece	2nd	100 m	11.03 (wind: +0.3 m/s)
2008	IAAF World Athletics Final	Stuttgart, Greece	3rd	200 m	22.72 (wind: +0.1 m/s)
2009	World Championships	Berlin, Germany	2nd	100 m	10.75 (wind: +0.1 m/s)
2009	World Championships	Berlin, Germany	1st	4 × 100 m relay	42.06
2009	IAAF World Athletics Final	Thessaloniki, Greece	3rd	100 m	10.90 (wind: -0.1 m/s)
2009	IAAF World Athletics Final	Thessaloniki, Greece	3rd	200 m	22.42 (wind: +0.1 m/s)
2011	World Championships	Daegu, South Korea	6th	100 m	11.15 (wind: -1.4 m/s)
2011	World Championships	Daegu, South Korea	5th	200 m	22.70 (wind: -1.0 m/s)
2011	World Championships	Daegu, South Korea	2nd	4 × 100 m relay	41.70
2012	Olympic Games	London, Great Britain	9th (sf)	100 m	11.04 (wind: +1.2 m/s)
2012	Olympic Games	London, Great Britain	2nd	4 × 100 m	41.41
2013	World Championships	Moscow, Russia	5th	100 m	10.97 (wind: -0.3 m/s)
2013	World Championships	Moscow, Russia	1st	4 × 100 m relay	41.29 CR
2014	World Relays	Nassau, Bahamas	2nd	4 × 100 m relay	42.28
2014	Commonwealth Games	Glasgow, Scotland	3rd	100 m	11.07
2014	Commonwealth Games	Glasgow, Scotland	1st	4 × 100 m relay	41.83
2015	NACAC Championships	San José, Costa Rica	4th	200 m	22.80 (wind: +1.3 m/s)
2015	Pan American Games	Toronto, Canada	5th	200 m	23.07 (wind: +1.1 m/s)
2015	Pan American Games	Toronto, Canada	2nd	4 × 100 m relay	42.68
2015	World Championships	Beijing, China	1st	4 × 100 m relay	41.84 (only heats)

=== Personal bests ===
- 100 metres – 10.75 s (2009)
- 200 metres – 21.99 s (2008)
