= Megan Clarke =

American epidemiologist

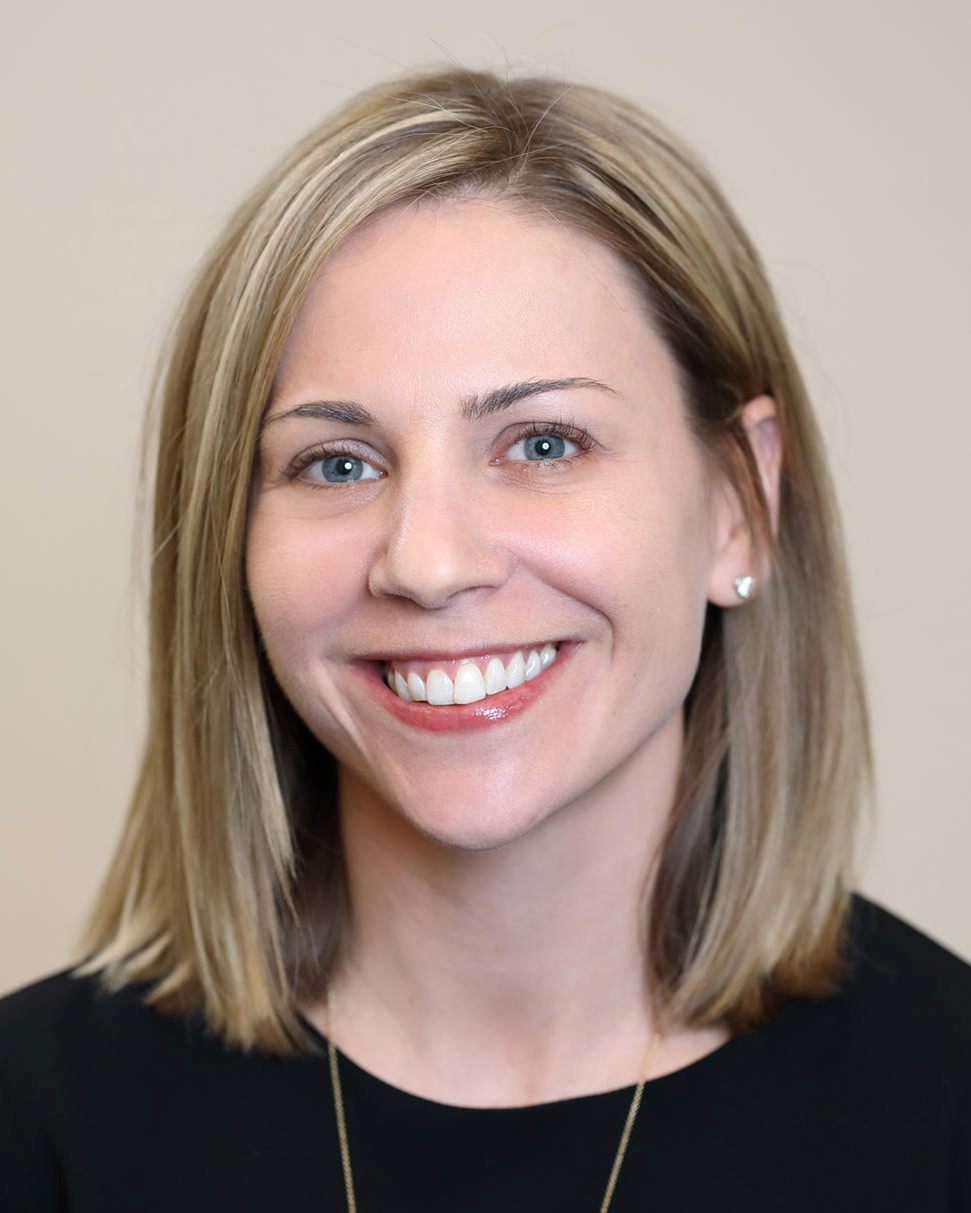
- Clarke in 2018
- Education: Johns Hopkins Bloomberg School of Public Health
- Scientific career
- Fields: Cancer epidemiology, DNA methylation
- Workplaces: National Institutes of Health
- Doctoral advisor: Corinne Joshu

Megan A. Clarke is an American cancer epidemiologist who researches anogenital and endometrial cancers. She is a Stadtman investigator in the clinical genetics branch at the National Cancer Institute.

== Life ==
Clarke was a postbaccalaureate fellow in the clinical genetics branch (CGB) at the National Cancer Institute (NCI). She completed a M.H.S. in biochemistry and molecular biology in 2010 and a Ph.D. in epidemiology in 2016, both from the Johns Hopkins Bloomberg School of Public Health. Her dissertation was titled, Early-life exposures and adult cancer risk: a life course approach to cancer prevention. Corinne Joshu was her doctoral advisor. Clarke was a postdoctoral cancer prevention fellow at the CGB.

Clark was promoted to research fellow in 2019 and was appointed as an Earl Stadtman Tenure-Track Investigator in 2020. She conducts research combining molecular, clinical, and population-based approaches to address etiology, prevention, and early detection of anogenital and endometrial cancers, yielding results that inform natural history and clinical management and address cancer disparities. Clarke studies cervical cancer disparities including race, ethnicity, and other factors such as obesity. She identified host gene and HPV DNA methylation as potential biomarkers for cervical carcinogenesis. Clarke collaborates with the NCI cancer genome research laboratory to develop a low-cost, next-generation sequencing methylation assay. She leads efforts to validate this assay in natural history studies and has designed a study (Selfie) for large-scale evaluation of methylation testing in self-collected samples.
