= Ailis McSweeney =

Irish sprinter

Medal record

Women's athletics

Representing Ireland

Summer Universiade
Silver medal – second place	2005 Izmir	100 m
Bronze medal – third place	2005 Izmir	4 × 100 m Relay

Ailis McSweeney (born 4 October 1983) is an Irish sprinter who specialises in 60 (indoor) and 100 metres. She previously held the Irish record at 100 metres, having posted a time of 11.40 s at an IAAF permit event in Liège, Belgium.

== Athletics career ==
McSweeney is affiliated with the Leevale Athletic Club in Cork City, Ireland.

She won the silver medal at the 2005 Summer Universiade and Bronze in the 4 × 100 m Relay. She also reached the semi-finals of the 100 m at the 2010 European Athletics Championships. She also competes over 60 metres and was a semi-finalist at the 2008 IAAF World Indoor Championships. She also finished ninth overall at the 2010 European Championships in Athletics, having missed out on a spot in the final by a one hundredth of a second. McSweeney competed in the 4 × 100 m relay at the same championships with Amy Foster, Niamh Whelan and Claire Brady. McSweeney ran the anchor leg alongside Olympic legend Merlene Ottey to finish fourth, and missed out on a spot in the final by 0.03 of a second.

McSweeney participated in the 2011 European Athletics Indoor Championships in the Women's 60 metres. In her first round heat, she finished fourth behind winner Hrystyna Stuy, Myriam Soumaré and youngster, Jodie Williams in a time of 7.38 and qualified as a fastest loser. In her semi-final, she started very strongly but ended up finishing seventh with Mariya Ryemyen winning the race in a time of 7.16, Véronique Mang finishing second and Hrystyna Stuy finishing third and Shane Healy coming fourth. McSweeney clocked a time of 7.34, which was not enough to advance and was 0.04 off the national record set by Anna Boyle.

McSweeney missed the Irish National Championships due to injury and was unable to defend her title. Amy Foster eventually took both the 100 and 200 metre titles.

== Personal life ==
Ailis McSweeney was born on 4 October 1983; her home town is Carrigtwohill in County Cork. McSweeney attended school at St. Aloysius' College in Carrigtwohill, where she led a 4 × 100 metres relay team that went undefeated during her time there. She went on to undergraduate study at University College Cork, finishing a BCL degree in 2004; McSweeney was selected to participate in the Law Faculty Annual Moot Court during her final year. In 2006, she studied for a Master's Degree in Globalisation at the Dublin City University School of Law and Government while preparing to become a solicitor. McSweeney married Dublin footballer Bryan Cullen in January 2013.

She currently works for A & L Goodbody in the International Financial Services Centre.
