= Adrienne Power =

Canadian sprinter

Personal information
- Nationality: Canada
- Born: December 11, 1981 (age 44) Halifax, Nova Scotia, Canada
- Height: 1.63 m (5 ft 4 in)
- Weight: 64 kg (141 lb)

Sport
- Sport: Athletics
- Event(s): 200 metres, 400 metres
- Club: Tiger Track Club
- Coached by: Peter Lord

Achievements and titles
- Personal best(s): 200 m: 22.86 s (2008); 400 m: 51.85 (2008)
Medal record
Women's athletics
Representing Canada
Commonwealth Games
Bronze medal – third place	2010 Delhi	200 m
Bronze medal – third place	2010 Delhi	4×400 m relay

Adrienne Power (born December 11, 1981) is a Canadian sprinter, who specialized in the 200 metres. She won two bronze medals for both the 200 metres and 4×400-metre relay at the 2010 Commonwealth Games in Delhi, India.

== Personal life ==
Born in Halifax, Nova Scotia, Power was raised by and spent most of her life with her grandparents in East Jeddore. She attended Dalhousie University in her birthplace, where she was a key member of the women's track and field program, under her personal and head coach Dan Hennigar. She won a total of nine medals, including six gold, at the Canadian Interuniversity Sport (CIS) championships, and was the only Atlantic University athlete to ever win the CIS Athlete of the Year award. In 2005, Power graduated from the University, with a bachelor's degree in commerce.

== Athletic career ==
Since graduating from the University, Power began training for the Tiger Track Club under her personal coach Hennigar. In 2005, she claimed her first title for the 200 metres, and won the bronze in the 100-metre sprint two years later. She made her international debut at the 2007 Pan American Games in Rio de Janeiro, Brazil, where she achieved a top-ten finish as part of the national team in the sprint relay. The following year, Power set her personal best time of 22.86 seconds for the 200-metre sprint at the U.S.A. Track and Field High Performance Sprint and Power meet in Provo, Utah. She qualified for the 2008 Summer Olympics in Beijing by winning the gold medal for the 200 metres at the Canadian Track and Field Championships.

At the 2008 Summer Olympics, Power was the nation's lone female sprinter to compete for the 200 metres. She ran in the fifth heat against seven other athletes, including defending Olympic champion Veronica Campbell-Brown of Jamaica. She finished the race in fifth place by seven hundredths of a second behind Sheniqua Ferguson of the Bahamas, outside her personal best time of 23.40 seconds. Although she was ranked below the mandatory qualifying slots, Power advanced into the next round based on her fastest time allotted in the preliminary heats. Power, however, fell short in her bid for the semi-finals, as she placed sixth in the second round, with her slowest possible time of 23.51 seconds.

At the 2010 Commonwealth Games in Delhi, India, Power made her international breakthrough, as she captured the bronze medal in the 200 metres, with an impressive time of 23.52 seconds, placing behind four-time Olympian Cydonie Mothersill of the Cayman Islands and England's Abi Oyepitan. She nearly missed out of the podium, together with her national team, as they placed fourth in the women's 4 × 400 m relay; however, they were immediately upgraded into the bronze medal position, following the disqualification of the Nigerian team.

Power currently trains for the Tiger Track Club in Halifax, and serves as a coach and mentor to the current track team.
