= Doris Tomasini =

Italian sprinter

Personal information
- Nationality: Italian
- Born: February 13, 1984 (age 42) Rovereto, Italy
- Height: 1.64 m (5 ft 4 1/2 in)
- Weight: 49 kg (108 lb)

Sport
- Country: Italy
- Sport: Athletics
- Event: Sprint
- Club: US Quercia Rovereto

Achievements and titles
- Personal bests: 100 m: 11.52 (2009); 200 m: 23.86 (2006); 60 m indoor: 7.53 (2008)
Medal record
Summer Universiade
Gold medal – first place	2009 Belgrade	4×100 m relay
Mediterranean Games
Bronze medal – third place	2005 Almeria	4×100 m relay
European U23 Championships
Silver medal – second place	2005 Erfurt	4×100 m relay

Doris Tomasini (born 13 February 1984, in Rovereto) is an Italian female sprinter.

== Biography ==
At senior level she two medals, with the national relay team, at the International athletics competitions.

== Achievements ==
Year	Competition	Venue	Position	Event	Notes
Representing Italy
2005	European U23 Championships	Erfurt, Germany	3rd	4 × 100 m relay	45.03
2005	Mediterranean Games	Almeria, Spain	3rd	4×100 metres relay	45.18
2009	Summer Universiade	Belgrade, Serbia	13th (sf)	200 metres	24.08
2009	Summer Universiade	Belgrade, Serbia	1st	4×100 metres relay	43.83

== See also ==
- Italy national relay team
