= Kerri-Ann Mitchell =

Canadian sprinter (born 1983)

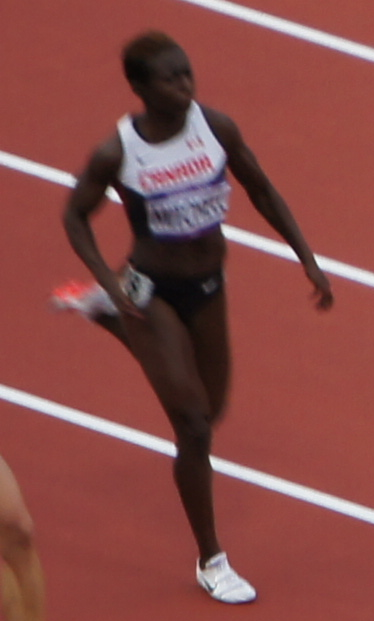
- Mitchell at the 2012 Summer Olympics

Personal information
- Born: 29 March 1983 (age 42) Toronto, Canada

Sport
- Sport: Track and field
- Club: Arkansas Razorbacks

Kerri-Ann Mitchell (born March 29, 1983) is a Canadian sprinter. She competed in the 100 metres competition at the 2012 Summer Olympics; she ran Round 1 in 11.49 seconds, which did not qualify her for the semifinals.
