= Katrin Käärt =

Estonian athletics competitor (born 1983)

Katrin Käärt (born 10 October 1983) is an Estonian athletics competitor.

She was born in Kohtla-Järve.

She began his athletics career in 1994, coached by his father. She is multiple-times Estonian champion in different athletics disciplines. 1998–2006 she was a member of Estonian national athletics team.

Her personal best in 400 m is 53,61 (2004).
