= 2006 European Athletics Championships – Women's 4 × 100 metres relay =

Women's 4 × 100 metres relay at the European Athletics Championships

The women's 4 × 100 metres relay at the 2006 European Athletics Championships were held at the Ullevi on 12 and 13 August.

== Medalists ==
Gold	Silver	Bronze
Russia; Yuliya Gushchina; Natalia Rusakova; Irina Khabarova; Yekaterina Grigoryeva; Yekaterina Kondratyeva; Larisa Kruglova	United Kingdom; Anyika Onuora; Emma Ania; Emily Freeman; Joice Maduaka; Laura Turner	Belarus; Yulia Nestsiarenka; Natallia Safronnikava; Alena Neumiarzhitskaya; Aksana Drahun

== Schedule ==
Date	Time	Round
12 August 2006	16:35	Heats
13 August 2006	14:50	Final

== Results ==
KEY:	q	Fastest non-qualifiers	Q	Qualified	NR	National record	PB	Personal best	SB	Seasonal best

=== Heats ===
First three in each heat (Q) and the next two fastest (q) advance to the final.

Rank	Heat	Nation	Athlete	Time	Notes
1	2	France	Véronique Mang, Fabienne Beret-Martinel, Adrianna Lamalle, Muriel Hurtis-Houairi	43.38	Q
2	1	Germany	Katja Wakan, Marion Wagner, Cathleen Tschirch, Verena Sailer	43.49	Q
3	2	Ukraine	Olena Chebanu, Halyna Tonkovyd, Iryna Shtanhyeyeva, Iryna Shepetyuk	43.62	Q
4	1	Russia	Yekaterina Kondratyeva, Natalia Rusakova, Irina Khabarova, Larisa Kruglova	43.65	Q
5	1	Belgium	Hanna Mariën, Frauke Penen, Olivia Borlée, Kim Gevaert	43.65	Q
6	2	Belarus	Yulia Nestsiarenka, Natallia Safronnikava, Alena Neumiarzhitskaya, Aksana Drahun	43.70	Q
7	2	United Kingdom	Anyika Onuora, Emily Freeman, Laura Turner, Joice Maduaka	44.00	q
8	1	Sweden	Emma Rienas, Susanna Kallur, Jenny Kallur, Emma Green	44.08	q
9	2	Greece	Hariklia Bouda, Effrosini Patsou, Eleftheria Kobidou, Georgia Kokloni	44.20	
10	1	Poland	Joanna Gabryelewicz, Daria Onyśko, Iwona Dorobisz, Beata Makaruk	44.27	
11	1	Finland	Sari Keskitalo, Johanna Manninen, Ilona Ranta, Heidi Hannula	44.32	
12	2	Ireland	Derval O'Rourke, Joanne Cuddihy, Ailis McSweeney, Anna Boyle	44.38	NR
13	1	Spain	Ruth Conde, Belén Recio, Claudia Troppa, Glory Alozie	44.85	
14	2	Turkey	Gülay Kirsan-Kiliç, Nevin Yanıt, Esen Kizildag, Saliha Memis-Özyurt	46.32	
	2	Czech Republic	Lucie Martincová, Štěpánka Klapáčová, Petra Seidlová, Iveta Mazáčová	DQ	

=== Final ===
Rank	Nation	Athletes	Time	Notes
1st place, gold medalist(s)	Russia	Yuliya Gushchina, Natalia Rusakova, Irina Khabarova, Yekaterina Grigoryeva	42.71	
2nd place, silver medalist(s)	United Kingdom	Anyika Onuora, Emma Ania, Emily Freeman, Joice Maduaka	43.51	
3rd place, bronze medalist(s)	Belarus	Yulia Nestsiarenka, Natallia Safronnikava, Alena Neumiarzhitskaya, Aksana Drahun	43.61	
4	Ukraine	Olena Chebanu, Halyna Tonkovyd, Iryna Shtanhyeyeva, Iryna Shepetyuk	43.97	
5	Sweden	Susanna Kallur, Carolina Klüft, Jenny Kallur, Emma Green	44.16	
	Belgium	Hanna Mariën, Frauke Penen, Olivia Borlée, Kim Gevaert	DNF	
	France	Véronique Mang, Fabienne Beret-Martinel, Adrianna Lamalle, Muriel Hurtis-Houairi	DNF	
	Germany	Katja Wakan, Marion Wagner, Cathleen Tschirch, Verena Sailer	DNF	
