= 2007 World Championships in Athletics – Women's 4 × 100 metres relay =

The women's 4 × 100 metre relay at the 2007 World Championships in Athletics was held at the Nagai Stadium in Osaka, Japan on 1 September.

== Medalists ==
Gold	Silver	Bronze
United States; Lauryn Williams; Allyson Felix; Mikele Barber; Torri Edwards; Carmelita Jeter*; Mechelle Lewis*	Jamaica; Sheri-Ann Brooks; Kerron Stewart; Simone Facey; Veronica Campbell; Shelly-Ann Fraser*	Belgium; Olivia Borlée; Hanna Mariën; Élodie Ouédraogo; Kim Gevaert

* Runners who participated in the heats only and received medals.

== Schedule ==
Date	Time	Round
September 1, 2007	9:45	Heats
September 1, 2007	22:05	Final

== Results ==
=== Heats ===
The first 2 of each heat (Q) plus the 2 fastest times (q) qualify.

Rank	Heat	Nation	Athletes	Time	Notes
1	2	United States	Carmelita Jeter, Mechelle Lewis, Mikele Barber, Lauryn Williams	42.24	Q, WL
2	2	Jamaica	Sheri-Ann Brooks, Kerron Stewart, Simone Facey, Shelly-Ann Fraser	42.70	Q, SB
3	2	Great Britain	Laura Turner, Montell Douglas, Emily Freeman, Joice Maduaka	42.82	Q, SB
4	1	Belgium	Olivia Borlee, Hanna Mariën, Elodie Ouédraogo, Kim Gevaert	42.85	Q, NR
5	1	Russia	Irina Khabarova, Natalia Rusakova, Yuliya Gushchina, Yevgeniya Polyakova	42.90	Q
6	1	Belarus	Nastassia Shuliak, Natallia Safronnikava, Alena Neumiarzhitskaya, Aksana Drahun	43.16	Q, SB
7	2	Germany	Katja Wakan, Cathleen Tschirch, Johanna Kedzierski, Verena Sailer	43.17	q
8	2	Poland	Marta Jeschke, Daria Korczyńska, Dorota Jędrusińska, Ewelina Klocek	43.25	q, SB
9	1	China	Tao Yujia, Chen Jue, Jiang Lan, Qin Wangping	43.39	SB
10	1	Finland	Heidi Hannula, Sari Keskitalo, Ilona Ranta, Johanna Manninen	43.41	
11	1	Nigeria	Gloria Kemasuode, Endurance Ojokolo, Oludamola Osayomi, Ene Franca Idoko	43.58	SB
12	2	Ghana	Gifty Addy, Elizabeth Amolofo, Esther Dankwah, Vida Anim	43.76	SB
13	1	France	Carima Louami, Muriel Hurtis-Houairi, Fabienne Beret-Martinel, Christine Arron	43.88	
14	1	Australia	Sally McLellan, Melanie Kleeberg, Crystal Attenborough, Fiona Cullen	43.91	
15	1	Brazil	Thatiana Regina Ignâcio, Lucimar Aparecida de Moura, Thaissa Presti, Luciana dos Santos	44.64	
	2	Cuba	Virgen Benavides, Roxana Díaz, Misleidys Lazo, Yenima Arencibia	DSQ	
	2	Japan	Saori Kitakaze, Sakie Nobuoka, Mayumi Watanabe, Momoko Takahashi	DSQ	
	2	Ukraine	Olena Chebanu, Nataliya Pohrebnyak, Iryna Shtanhyeyeva, Iryna Shepetyuk	DNF	

=== Final ===
Rank	Nation	Athletes	Time	Notes
1st place, gold medalist(s)	United States	Lauryn Williams, Allyson Felix, Mikele Barber, Torri Edwards	41.98	WL
2nd place, silver medalist(s)	Jamaica	Sheri-Ann Brooks, Kerron Stewart, Simone Facey, Veronica Campbell	42.01	SB
3rd place, bronze medalist(s)	Belgium	Olivia Borlee, Hanna Mariën, Elodie Ouédraogo, Kim Gevaert	42.75	NR
4	Great Britain	Laura Turner, Montell Douglas, Emily Freeman, Joice Maduaka	42.87	SB
5	Russia	Ekaterina Grigorieva, Natalia Rusakova, Yuliya Gushchina, Yevgeniya Polyakova	42.97	
6	Belarus	Nastassia Shuliak, Natallia Safronnikava, Alena Neumiarzhitskaya, Aksana Drahun	43.37	
7	Germany	Katja Wakan, Cathleen Tschirch, Johanna Kedzierski, Verena Sailer	43.51	
8	Poland	Marta Jeschke, Daria Korczyńska, Dorota Jędrusińska, Ewelina Klocek	43.57	
