= 2001 European Athletics U23 Championships – Women's 100 metres =

The women's 100 metres event at the 2001 European Athletics U23 Championships was held in Amsterdam, Netherlands, at Olympisch Stadion on 12 and 13 July.

== Medalists ==
Gold	Sina Schielke; Germany
Silver	Abiodun Oyepitan; United Kingdom
Bronze	Johanna Manninen; Finland

== Results ==
=== Final ===
13 July
Wind: -1.2 m/s

Rank	Name	Nationality	Time	Notes
1st place, gold medalist(s)	Sina Schielke	Germany	11.52	
2nd place, silver medalist(s)	Abiodun Oyepitan	United Kingdom	11.58	
3rd place, bronze medalist(s)	Johanna Manninen	Finland	11.61	
4	Yuliya Tabakova	Russia	11.65	
5	Heidi Hannula	Finland	11.71	
6	Yuliya Bartsevich	Belarus	11.80	
7	Georgia Kokloni	Greece	11.89	
8	Emily Maher	Ireland	11.93	

=== Heats ===
12 July
Qualified: first 2 in each heat and 2 best to the Final

==== Heat 1 ====
Wind: -0.2 m/s

Rank	Name	Nationality	Time	Notes
1	Yuliya Tabakova	Russia	11.37	Q
2	Emily Maher	Ireland	11.82	Q
3	Sandra Möller	Germany	11.88	
4	Sara Botto	Italy	11.92	
5	Céline Nyanga	France	11.97	
6	Olena Pastushenko	Ukraine	11.98	
7	Oksana Dragun	Belarus	12.08	

==== Heat 2 ====
Wind: 1.1 m/s

Rank	Name	Nationality	Time	Notes
1	Johanna Manninen	Finland	11.59	Q
2	Sina Schielke	Germany	11.65	Q
3	Céline Thélamon	France	11.85	
4	Susan Burnside	United Kingdom	11.94	
5	Yelena Nevmerzhitskaya	Belarus	11.98	
6	Athina Kopsia	Greece	12.03	
7	Élodie Ouédraogo	Belgium	12.07	
8	Iryna Kozhemyakina	Ukraine	12.13	

==== Heat 3 ====
Wind: 0.2 m/s

Rank	Name	Nationality	Time	Notes
1	Abiodun Oyepitan	United Kingdom	11.43	Q
2	Heidi Hannula	Finland	11.58	Q
3	Georgia Kokloni	Greece	11.70	q
4	Yuliya Bartsevich	Belarus	11.77	q
5	Audra Dagelytė	Lithuania	11.93	
6	Carima Louami	France	11.93	
7	Pascal van Assendelft	Netherlands	11.93	
8	Sabrina Scott	United Kingdom	11.94	

== Participation ==
According to an unofficial count, 23 athletes from 13 countries participated in the event.

- Belarus (3)
- Belgium (1)
- Finland (2)
- France (3)
- Germany (2)
- Greece (2)
- Ireland (1)
- Italy (1)
- Lithuania (1)
- Netherlands (1)
- Russia (1)
- Ukraine (2)
- United Kingdom (3)
