= 2003 European Athletics U23 Championships – Women's 4 × 100 metres relay =

The women's 4 x 100 metres relay event at the 2003 European Athletics U23 Championships was held in Bydgoszcz, Poland, at Zawisza Stadion on 19 and 20 July.

== Medalists ==
Gold	Nataliya Pyhyda; Iryna Shepetyuk; Olena Chebanu; Marina Maydanova; Ukraine
Silver	Anna Radoszewska; Daria Onyśko; Dorota Dydo; Małgorzata Flejszar; Poland
Bronze	Tanja Kuckelkorn; Lisa Schorr; Katja Wakan; Nadine Hentschke; Germany

== Results ==
=== Final ===
20 July

Rank	Nation	Competitors	Time	Notes
1st place, gold medalist(s)	Ukraine	Nataliya Pyhyda; Iryna Shepetyuk; Olena Chebanu; Marina Maydanova	44.29	
2nd place, silver medalist(s)	Poland	Anna Radoszewska; Daria Onyśko; Dorota Dydo; Małgorzata Flejszar	44.51	
3rd place, bronze medalist(s)	Germany	Tanja Kuckelkorn; Lisa Schorr; Katja Wakan; Nadine Hentschke	44.59	
4	France	Amélie Huyghes; Solene Désert; Gwladys Belliard; Natalia Losange	44.71	
5	Italy	Leonarda Morana; Micol Cattaneo; Erica Marchetti; Vincenza Calì	44.82	
6	United Kingdom	Jeanette Kwakye; Lisa Miller; Danielle Norville; Laura Turner	44.87	
7	Belgium	Elisabeth Davin; Lien Huyghebaert; Audrey Rochtus; Élodie Ouédraogo	44.94	
8	Switzerland	Barbara Morza; Jessica Kilian; Renate Kohler; Barbara Leuthard	45.69	

=== Heats ===
19 July
Qualified: first 3 in each heat and 2 best to the Final

==== Heat 1 ====
Rank	Nation	Competitors	Time	Notes
1	Belgium	Elisabeth Davin; Lien Huyghebaert; Élodie Ouédraogo; Audrey Rochtus	45.20	Q
2	Germany	Tanja Kuckelkorn; Lisa Schorr; Katja Wakan; Nadine Hentschke	45.35	Q
3	United Kingdom	Kelly Thomas; Lisa Miller; Danielle Norville; Laura Turner	45.41	Q
4	Italy	Leonarda Morana; Vincenza Calì; Erica Marchetti; Micol Cattaneo	45.59	q
5	Switzerland	Barbara Morza; Jessica Kilian; Renate Kohler; Barbara Leuthard	46.21	q

==== Heat 2 ====
Rank	Nation	Competitors	Time	Notes
1	Ukraine	Nataliya Pyhyda; Iryna Shepetyuk; Olena Chebanu; Marina Maydanova	44.34	Q
2	Poland	Anna Radoszewska; Daria Onyśko; Dorota Dydo; Małgorzata Flejszar	44.55	Q
3	France	Amélie Huyghes; Natalia Losange; Gwladys Belliard; Stéphanie Luzieux	45.29	Q
	Ireland	Emily Maher; Anna Boyle; Fiona O'Friel; Ailis McSweeney	DQ	

== Participation ==
According to an unofficial count, 38 athletes from 9 countries participated in the event.

- Belgium (4)
- France (5)
- Germany (4)
- Ireland (4)
- Italy (4)
- Poland (4)
- Switzerland (4)
- Ukraine (4)
- United Kingdom (5)
