= Athletics at the 2007 Summer Universiade – Women's 4 × 100 metres relay =

The women's 4 × 100 metres relay event at the 2007 Summer Universiade was held on 9 July.

== Medalists ==
| Gold | Silver | Bronze |
|---|---|---|
| Finland; Heidi Hannula; Sari Keskitalo; Ilona Ranta; Johanna Manninen | Thailand; Sangwan Jaksunin; Orranut Klomdee; Jutamass Tawoncharoen; Nongnuch Sanrat | Ukraine; Olena Chebanu; Halyna Tonkovyd; Iryna Shtanhyeyeva; Iryna Shepetyuk |

== Results ==
=== Heats ===
Qualification: First 3 teams of each heat (Q) plus the next 2 fastest (q) qualified for the final.

| Rank | Heat | Nation | Athletes | Time | Notes |
|---|---|---|---|---|---|
| 1 | 1 | Finland | Heidi Hannula, Sari Keskitalo, Ilona Ranta, Johanna Manninen | 43.95 | Q |
| 2 | 2 | Russia | Yuna Mekhti-Zade, Kseniya Vdovina, Natalya Murinovich, Anna Geflikh | 43.97 | Q |
| 3 | 1 | Ukraine | Olena Chebanu, Halyna Tonkovyd, Iryna Shtanhyeyeva, Iryna Shepetyuk | 44.10 | Q |
| 4 | 1 | Thailand | Sangwan Jaksunin, Orranut Klomdee, Jutamass Tawoncharoen, Nongnuch Sanrat | 44.31 | Q |
| 5 | 1 | Lithuania | Edita Lingytė, Lina Andrijauskaitė, Sonata Tamošaitytė, Audra Dagelytė | 44.72 | q |
| 6 | 2 | Italy | Chiara Gervasi, Maria Aurora Salvagno, Giulia Arcioni, Audrey Alloh | 44.77 | Q |
| 7 | 1 | China | Zhang Rong, Tao Yujia, Han Ling, Qin Wangping | 46.05 | q |
| 8 | 1 | Turkey | Saliha Özyurt, Burcu Şentürk, ?, ? | 46.67 | |
| 9 | 2 | Chinese Taipei | Lin Yi-chun, Chuang Shu-chuan, Lee Chen Ying-ru, Yu Sheue-an | 46.82 | Q |
| 10 | 2 | Ghana | Rita Petershie, Olivia Kyere-Boateng, Limian Kyei Frimpomaa, Edwina Judith Nanevie | 48.42 | |
| 11 | 2 | Sri Lanka | Subashinishiromala Hemakumari, Sandamal Nilmini Kumari, Thanuja Malkanthi, Maheshika Chandani Karunanayake | 52.12 | |
| 12 | 1 | Pakistan | Amina Khalib, Sidra Syed Ali, Beenish Amin, ? | 58.77 | |
| | 2 | France | Violaine Noyat, Lina Jacques-Sébastien, Natacha Vouaux, Amandine Elard | DNF | |

=== Final ===
| Rank | Lane | Nation | Athletes | Time | Notes |
|---|---|---|---|---|---|
| 1st place, gold medalist(s) | 3 | Finland | Heidi Hannula, Sari Keskitalo, Ilona Ranta, Johanna Manninen | 43.48 | |
| 2nd place, silver medalist(s) | 7 | Thailand | Sangwan Jaksunin, Orranut Klomdee, Jutamass Tawoncharoen, Nongnuch Sanrat | 43.92 | SB |
| 3rd place, bronze medalist(s) | 6 | Ukraine | Olena Chebanu, Halyna Tonkovyd, Iryna Shtanhyeyeva, Iryna Shepetyuk | 43.99 | |
| 4 | 5 | Russia | Yuna Mekhti-Zade, Kseniya Vdovina, Natalya Murinovich, Aleksandra Fedoriva | 44.16 | |
| 5 | 4 | Italy | Chiara Gervasi, Maria Aurora Salvagno, Giulia Arcioni, Audrey Alloh | 44.71 | |
| 6 | 8 | Lithuania | Edita Lingytė, Lina Andrijauskaitė, Sonata Tamošaitytė, Audra Dagelytė | 44.88 | |
| 7 | 1 | China | Zhang Rong, Tao Yujia, Han Ling, Qin Wangping | 45.77 | |
| 8 | 2 | Chinese Taipei | Lin Yi-chun, Chuang Shu-chuan, Lee Chen Ying-ru, Yu Sheue-an | 46.74 | |
