= Athletics at the 2007 Summer Universiade – Women's 100 metres =

The women's 100 metres event at the 2007 Summer Universiade was held on 10–11 August.

== Medalists ==
Gold	Silver	Bronze
Johanna Manninen; Finland	Olena Chebanu; Ukraine	Audra Dagelytė; Lithuania

== Results ==
=== Heats ===
Qualification: First 4 of each heat (Q) and the next 4 fastest (q) qualified for the quarterfinals.

Wind:
Heat 1: -1.2 m/s, Heat 2: -0.6 m/s, Heat 3: -0.3 m/s, Heat 4: -0.8 m/s, Heat 5: -2.0 m/s, Heat 6: -0.4 m/s, Heat 7: -1.8 m/s

Rank	Heat	Name	Nationality	Time	Notes
1	2	Johanna Manninen	Finland	11.53	Q
2	2	Audra Dagelytė	Lithuania	11.63	Q
3	5	Olena Chebanu	Ukraine	11.68	Q
4	6	Yuna Mekhti-Zade	Russia	11.71	Q
5	7	Natalya Murinovich	Russia	11.76	Q
6	7	Iryna Shepetyuk	Ukraine	11.77	Q
7	5	Maria Aurora Salvagno	Italy	11.82	Q
8	2	Celiangeli Morales	Puerto Rico	11.84	Q
9	3	Natacha Vouaux	France	11.85	Q
10	3	Edita Lingytė	Lithuania	11.87	Q
11	6	Tao Yujia	China	11.92	Q
12	1	Cindy Stewart	South Africa	11.93	Q
13	2	Audrey Alloh	Italy	11.94	Q
13	4	Sabina Veit	Slovenia	11.94	Q
15	6	Maja Golub	Croatia	11.95	Q
16	4	Thaissa Presti	Brazil	11.98	Q
17	7	Heidi Hannula	Finland	11.99	Q
18	6	Sonia Tavares	Portugal	12.00	Q
19	5	Lina Jacques-Sébastien	France	12.01	Q
20	4	Saliha Özyurt	Turkey	12.07	Q
21	3	Thandiwe Vilakazi	South Africa	12.08	Q
22	6	Momoko Takahashi	Japan	12.09	q
23	1	Ailis McSweeney	Ireland	12.13	Q, FS1
23	7	Anna Boyle	Ireland	12.13	Q
25	3	Nongnuch Sanrat	Thailand	12.14	Q
26	2	Zsófia Rózsa	Hungary	12.20	q
26	4	Lin Yi-chun	Chinese Taipei	12.20	Q
28	1	Burcu Şentürk	Turkey	12.29	Q
28	5	Orranut Klomdee	Thailand	12.29	Q
30	1	Mirjam Liimask	Estonia	12.35	Q
31	4	Maty Salame	Senegal	12.36	q
32	3	Nina Kovačič	Slovenia	12.38	q
33	3	Chan Ho Yee	Hong Kong	12.46	
34	4	Norjannah Hafiszah Jamaludin	Malaysia	12.53	
35	4	Olivia Kyere-Boateng	Ghana	12.56	
36	7	Millysand De La Paz	Netherlands Antilles	12.61	
37	5	Choo Amanda	Singapore	12.63	
38	2	Lee Chen Ying-ru	Chinese Taipei	12.67	
39	6	Edwina Judith Nanevie	Ghana	12.71	
39	7	Siao Mei Ann	Singapore	12.71	FS1
41	5	Patricia Riesco	Peru	12.87	
42	6	Emmanuela Oroma	Uganda	12.92	
43	4	Leckat Snege	Gabon	13.31	
44	3	Beenish Amin	Pakistan	13.35	
45	7	Linda Opiyo	Kenya	13.64	
46	6	Lina Bejjani	Lebanon	13.76	
47	1	Khurshida Khatun	Bangladesh	14.61	
48	1	Sidra Syed Ali	Pakistan	16.44	
	5	Jung Soon-Ok	South Korea	DNF	
	2	Amina Khalib	Pakistan	DNS	
	3	Justine Bayigga	Uganda	DNS	
	5	Restituta Ayetebe Bibang	Equatorial Guinea	DNS	
	7	Qin Wangping	China	DNS	

=== Quarterfinals ===
Qualification: First 4 of each heat qualified directly (Q) for the semifinals.

Wind:
Heat 1: -0.9 m/s, Heat 2: -0.3 m/s, Heat 3: -0.5 m/s, Heat 4: -1.4 m/s

Rank	Heat	Name	Nationality	Time	Notes
1	1	Johanna Manninen	Finland	11.36	Q, FS1
2	2	Olena Chebanu	Ukraine	11.51	Q
3	1	Audra Dagelytė	Lithuania	11.60	Q
4	3	Yuna Mekhti-Zade	Russia	11.61	Q
5	2	Maria Aurora Salvagno	Italy	11.66	Q
6	1	Iryna Shepetyuk	Ukraine	11.69	Q
7	1	Maja Golub	Croatia	11.73	Q
7	2	Lina Jacques-Sébastien	France	11.73	Q
9	4	Tao Yujia	China	11.74	Q, FS1
10	2	Sabina Veit	Slovenia	11.78	Q, FS1
10	4	Natalya Murinovich	Russia	11.78	Q
12	3	Edita Lingytė	Lithuania	11.83	Q
13	4	Thaissa Presti	Brazil	11.85	Q
14	3	Cindy Stewart	South Africa	11.88	Q
14	4	Heidi Hannula	Finland	11.88	Q
16	4	Natacha Vouaux	France	11.90	
17	2	Celiangeli Morales	Puerto Rico	11.92	
17	3	Ailis McSweeney	Ireland	11.92	Q, SB, FS1
19	1	Nongnuch Sanrat	Thailand	11.98	
19	4	Momoko Takahashi	Japan	11.98	
21	2	Sonia Tavares	Portugal	11.99	
22	3	Saliha Özyurt	Turkey	12.01	
23	3	Audrey Alloh	Italy	12.02	
24	1	Anna Boyle	Ireland	12.03	
25	2	Lin Yi-chun	Chinese Taipei	12.10	
25	3	Orranut Klomdee	Thailand	12.10	
27	3	Zsófia Rózsa	Hungary	12.23	
28	4	Burcu Şentürk	Turkey	12.26	
29	1	Nina Kovačič	Slovenia	12.28	
29	2	Maty Salame	Senegal	12.28	
31	4	Mirjam Liimask	Estonia	12.31	
	1	Thandiwe Vilakazi	South Africa	DQ	FS2

=== Semifinals ===
Qualification: First 4 of each semifinal qualified directly (Q) for the final.

Wind:
Heat 1: -2.0 m/s, Heat 2: -1.9 m/s

Rank	Heat	Name	Nationality	Time	Notes
1	2	Johanna Manninen	Finland	11.54	Q
2	1	Olena Chebanu	Ukraine	11.59	Q
3	1	Yuna Mekhti-Zade	Russia	11.72	Q
4	2	Tao Yujia	China	11.75	Q
5	2	Audra Dagelytė	Lithuania	11.76	Q
6	2	Iryna Shepetyuk	Ukraine	11.83	Q
7	1	Maria Aurora Salvagno	Italy	11.84	Q
8	1	Edita Lingytė	Lithuania	11.85	Q
9	2	Natalya Murinovich	Russia	11.89	
10	1	Sabina Veit	Slovenia	11.91	FS1
11	2	Maja Golub	Croatia	11.93	
12	1	Lina Jacques-Sébastien	France	11.98	
13	1	Thaissa Presti	Brazil	12.00	
14	1	Heidi Hannula	Finland	12.01	
15	2	Cindy Stewart	South Africa	12.05	
16	2	Ailis McSweeney	Ireland	12.14	

=== Final ===
Wind: -0.8 m/s

Rank	Lane	Name	Nationality	Time	Notes
1st place, gold medalist(s)	5	Johanna Manninen	Finland	11.46	
2nd place, silver medalist(s)	3	Olena Chebanu	Ukraine	11.56	
3rd place, bronze medalist(s)	7	Audra Dagelytė	Lithuania	11.65	
4	6	Yuna Mekhti-Zade	Russia	11.68	
5	4	Tao Yujia	China	11.70	
6	8	Iryna Shepetyuk	Ukraine	11.71	
7	2	Maria Aurora Salvagno	Italy	11.73	
8	1	Edita Lingytė	Lithuania	11.82	
