= 2001 European Athletics U23 Championships – Women's 4 × 100 metres relay =

The women's 4 x 100 metres relay event at the 2001 European Athletics U23 Championships was held in Amsterdam, Netherlands, at Olympisch Stadion on 15 July.

== Medalists ==
Gold	Susan Burnside; Helen Roscoe; Sabrina Scott; Abiodun Oyepitan; United Kingdom
Silver	Yuliya Bartsevich; Oksana Dragun; Yelena Nevmerzhitskaya; Yevgeniya Likhuta; Belarus
Bronze	Elina Lax; Heidi Hannula; Johanna Manninen; Katja Salivaara; Finland

== Results ==
=== Final ===
15 July

Rank	Nation	Competitors	Time	Notes
1st place, gold medalist(s)	United Kingdom	Susan Burnside; Helen Roscoe; Sabrina Scott; Abiodun Oyepitan	44.31	
2nd place, silver medalist(s)	Belarus	Yuliya Bartsevich; Oksana Dragun; Yelena Nevmerzhitskaya; Yevgeniya Likhuta	44.64	
3rd place, bronze medalist(s)	Finland	Elina Lax; Heidi Hannula; Johanna Manninen; Katja Salivaara	44.76	
4	France	Armelle Tessia-Kuyo; Céline Nyanga; Carima Louami; Céline Thélamon	44.80	
5	Greece	Georgia Kokloni; Olga Kaidantzi; Athina Kopsia; Chariklia Bouda	45.11	
	Germany	Tatjana Koob; Sina Schielke; Sandra Möller; Korinna Fink	DQ	

== Participation ==
According to an unofficial count, 24 athletes from 6 countries participated in the event.

- Belarus (4)
- Finland (4)
- France (4)
- Germany (4)
- Greece (4)
- United Kingdom (4)
