= 2005 World Championships in Athletics – Women's 4 × 100 metres relay =

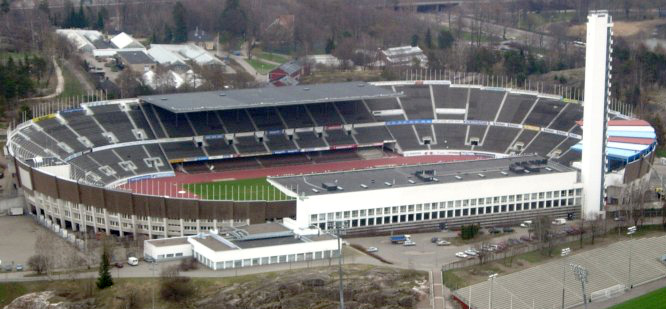
Helsinki Olympic Stadium in Helsinki, Finland.

The 4 × 100 metre relay at the 2005 World Championships in Athletics was held at the Helsinki Olympic Stadium on August 13 and August 14.

== Medals ==
Gold:	Silver:	Bronze:
United States: Angela Daigle; Muna Lee; Me'Lisa Barber; Lauryn Williams	Jamaica: Daniele Browning; Sherone Simpson; Aleen Bailey; Veronica Campbell	Belarus: Yulia Nesterenko; Natalya Sologub; Alena Nevmerzhitskaya; Oksana Dragun

== Qualifying ==
From the initial two heats the first three teams in each plus two fastest losers progressed through to the final.

All times shown are in seconds.

- Q denotes automatic qualification.
- q denotes fastest losers.
- DNS denotes did not start.
- DNF denotes did not finish.
- AR denotes area record.
- NR denotes national record.
- PB denotes personal best.
- SB denotes season's best.

== Heats ==
=== Heat 1 ===
1. United States (Angela Daigle, Muna Lee, Me'Lisa Barber, Lauryn Williams) 42.16s Q (WL)
2. Nigeria (Gloria Kemasuode, Endurance Ojokolo, Oludamola Osayomi, Mercy Nku) 43.53s Q (SB)
3. Sweden (Emma Rienas, Carolina Klüft, Jenny Kallur, Susanna Kallur) 43.67s (NR)
4. Great Britain (Emily Freeman, Emma Ania, Laura Turner, Katherine Endacott) 43.83 (SB)
- Netherlands (Pascal van Assendelft, Jacqueline Poelman, Annemarie Kramer, Judith Baarssen) DQ
- Bahamas (Tamicka Clarke, Chandra Sturrup, Savatheda Fynes, Philippa Arnett-Willie) DNF

=== Heat 2 ===
1. France (Patricia Buval, Lina Jacques-Sébastien, Fabe Dia, Christine Arron) 42.86 Q (SB)
2. Jamaica (Daniele Browning, Sherone Simpson, Beverly McDonald, Aleen Bailey) 42.97s Q (SB)
3. Colombia (Melisa Murillo, Felipa Palacios, Darlenis Obregón, Norma Gonzalez) 43.03s q (NR)
4. Brazil (Raquel Martins da Costa, Lucimar Aparecida de Moura, Thatiana Regina Ignâcio, Luciana Alves dos Santos) 43.22s q (SB)
5. Italy (Elena Sordelli, Vincenza Calì, Manuela Grillo, Maria Aurora Salvagno) 44.03s
- Finland (Ilona Ranta, Katja Salivaara, Sari Keskitalo, Heidi Hannula) DNF

=== Heat 3 ===
1. Belarus (Yulia Nesterenko, Natalya Sologub, Alena Nevmerzhitskaya, Oksana Dragun) 42.80s Q (NR)
2. Poland (Iwona Dorobisz, Daria Onyśko, Dorota Dydo, Iwona Brzezińska) 43.37s Q (SB)
3. Belgium (Katleen De Caluwé, Nancy Callaerts, Élodie Ouédraogo, Kim Gevaert) 43.40s (SB)
4. Ukraine (Iryna Kozhemyakina, Iryna Shepetyuk, Iryna Shtanhyeyeva, Olena Pastushenko-Sinyavina) 43.62s (SB)
5. Japan (Tomoko Ishida, Ayumi Suzuki, Yuka Sato, Sakie Nobuoka) 44.52s (SB)
- Russia (Yekaterina Kondratyeva, Yuliya Gushchina, Irina Khabarova, Larisa Kruglova) DNF

== Final ==
1. United States (Angela Daigle, Muna Lee, Me'Lisa Barber, Lauryn Williams) 41.78s (WL)
2. Jamaica (Daniele Browning, Sherone Simpson, Aleen Bailey, Veronica Campbell) 41.99s (SB)
3. Belarus (Yulia Nesterenko, Natalya Sologub, Alena Nevmerzhitskaya, Oksana Dragun) 42.56s (NR)
4. France (Patricia Buval, Lina Jacques-Sébastien, Fabe Dia, Christine Arron) 42.85 (SB)
5. Brazil (Raquel Martins da Costa, Lucimar Aparecida de Moura, Thatiana Regina Ignâcio, Luciana Alves dos Santos) 42.99s (SB)
6. Colombia (Melisa Murillo, Felipa Palacios, Darlenis Obregón, Norma Gonzalez) 43.07s
7. Nigeria (Gloria Kemasuode, Endurance Ojokolo, Oludamola Osayomi, Mercy Nku) 43.25s (SB)
8. Poland (Iwona Dorobisz, Daria Onyśko, Dorota Dydo, Iwona Brzezińska) 43.49s
