= 2005 European Athletics Indoor Championships – Women's 60 metres =

The Women's 60 metres event at the 2005 European Athletics Indoor Championships was held on March 4–5.

== Medalists ==
Gold	Silver	Bronze
Kim Gevaert; Belgium	Georgia Kokloni; Greece	Maria Karastamati; Greece

== Results ==
=== Heats ===
First 3 of each heat (Q) and the next 4 fastest (q) qualified for the semifinals.

Rank	Heat	Name	Nationality	Time	Notes
1	4	Georgia Kokloni	Greece	7.14	Q, PB
2	3	Kim Gevaert	Belgium	7.17	Q
3	3	Maria Karastamati	Greece	7.25	Q
4	4	Larisa Kruglova	Russia	7.27	Q
5	2	Heidi Hannula	Finland	7.28	Q, =PB
5	4	Daria Onyśko	Poland	7.28	Q
7	1	Nadine Hentschke	Germany	7.29	Q
8	1	Alena Neumiarzhitskaya	Belarus	7.30	Q
8	3	Mariya Bolikova	Russia	7.30	Q
8	4	Katrin Käärt	Estonia	7.30	q, NR
11	2	Marion Wagner	Germany	7.31	Q
12	1	Jeanette Kwakye	Great Britain	7.33	Q
12	2	Yekaterina Grigoryeva	Russia	7.33	Q
14	4	Johanna Manninen	Finland	7.36	q
15	3	Linda Ferga-Khodadin	France	7.37	q
16	1	Lina Grinčikaitė	Lithuania	7.41	q
17	3	Katherine Endacott	Great Britain	7.43	
18	4	Ailis McSweeney	Ireland	7.44	
19	1	Vukosava Đapić	Serbia and Montenegro	7.48	
20	2	Carme Blay	Spain	7.50	SB
21	2	Joice Maduaka	Great Britain	7.51	
21	3	Fabienne Weyermann	Switzerland	7.51	
23	1	Emily Maher	Ireland	7.60	
24	2	Therese Mallia	Malta	7.96	NR
	2	Christine Arron	France	DNF	

=== Semifinals ===
First 4 of each semifinals qualified directly (Q) for the final.

Rank	Heat	Name	Nationality	Time	Notes
1	2	Georgia Kokloni	Greece	7.16	Q
2	1	Maria Karastamati	Greece	7.19	Q, PB
3	1	Kim Gevaert	Belgium	7.22	Q
3	2	Larisa Kruglova	Russia	7.22	Q
5	2	Mariya Bolikova	Russia	7.23	Q
6	2	Alena Neumiarzhitskaya	Belarus	7.28	Q
7	2	Nadine Hentschke	Germany	7.28	
8	1	Marion Wagner	Germany	7.29	Q
9	1	Heidi Hannula	Finland	7.31	Q
10	1	Yekaterina Grigoryeva	Russia	7.32	
11	1	Johanna Manninen	Finland	7.32	
12	2	Katrin Käärt	Estonia	7.34	
13	2	Jeanette Kwakye	Great Britain	7.34	
14	1	Daria Onyśko	Poland	7.35	
15	1	Linda Ferga-Khodadin	France	7.37	
16	2	Lina Grinčikaitė	Lithuania	7.41	

=== Final ===
Rank	Lane	Name	Nationality	Time	React	Notes
1st place, gold medalist(s)	5	Kim Gevaert	Belgium	7.16	0.123	
2nd place, silver medalist(s)	6	Georgia Kokloni	Greece	7.18	0.108	
3rd place, bronze medalist(s)	4	Maria Karastamati	Greece	7.25	0.148	
4	1	Mariya Bolikova	Russia	7.29	0.159	
5	3	Larisa Kruglova	Russia	7.32	0.192	
6	7	Marion Wagner	Germany	7.32	0.160	
7	2	Alena Neumiarzhitskaya	Belarus	7.41	0.221	
8	8	Heidi Hannula	Finland	7.44	0.240	
