= 2009 European Athletics Indoor Championships – Women's 60 metres =

The Women's 60 metres event at the 2009 European Athletics Indoor Championships was held on March 7–8.

== Medalists ==
Gold	Silver	Bronze
Yevgeniya Polyakova; Russia	Ezinne Okparaebo; Norway	Verena Sailer; Germany

== Results ==
=== Heats ===
First 3 of each heat (Q) and the next 4 fastest (q) qualified for the semifinals.

Rank	Heat	Name	Nationality	Time	Notes
1	3	Ezinne Okparaebo	Norway	7.22	Q, NR
2	1	Anna Geflikh	Russia	7.30	Q
2	2	Yevgeniya Polyakova	Russia	7.30	Q
2	3	Verena Sailer	Germany	7.30	Q
5	2	Inna Eftimova	Bulgaria	7.31	Q
5	4	Natalya Murinovich	Russia	7.31	Q
7	1	Emma Rienas	Sweden	7.32	Q, PB
7	4	Lena Berntsson	Sweden	7.32	Q
9	3	Anita Pistone	Italy	7.33	Q
10	2	Maria Aurora Salvagno	Italy	7.34	Q, PB
11	2	Bettina Müller-Weissina	Austria	7.34	q
12	1	Lina Grinčikaitė	Lithuania	7.37	Q
12	2	Folake Akinyemi	Norway	7.37	q
14	1	Ayodelé Ikuesan	France	7.38	q
15	4	Angela Moroșanu	Romania	7.39	Q
16	4	Martina Giovanetti	Italy	7.40	q
17	1	Yuliya Balykina	Belarus	7.41	
18	3	Lina Jacques-Sébastien	France	7.43	
18	4	Aksana Drahun	Belarus	7.43	
20	3	Amparo María Cotán	Spain	7.48	
21	1	Niamh Whelan	Ireland	7.49	
21	4	Liene Purina	Latvia	7.49	PB
23	2	Ailis McSweeney	Ireland	7.51	
24	4	Edita Kavaliauskienė	Lithuania	7.52	
25	2	Belén Recio	Spain	7.58	
26	3	Yelizaveta Bryzhina	Ukraine	7.63	
27	1	Jekaterina Čekele	Latvia	7.65	
28	3	Anna Olsson	Denmark	7.70	
29	3	Rotem Batat	Israel	7.83	PB
30	4	Lara Scerri	Malta	7.98	PB
31	2	Ivana Rožman	Macedonia	8.05	

=== Semifinals ===
First 4 of each semifinals qualified directly (Q) for the final.

Rank	Heat	Name	Nationality	Time	Notes
1	1	Verena Sailer	Germany	7.17	Q
2	1	Ezinne Okparaebo	Norway	7.22	Q, =NR
3	2	Yevgeniya Polyakova	Russia	7.25	Q
4	2	Anna Geflikh	Russia	7.29	Q
5	1	Anita Pistone	Italy	7.32	Q, SB
6	1	Lena Berntsson	Sweden	7.34	Q
6	1	Bettina Müller-Weissina	Austria	7.34	
6	2	Lina Grinčikaitė	Lithuania	7.34	Q
9	1	Natalya Murinovich	Russia	7.37	
10	2	Maria Aurora Salvagno	Italy	7.38	Q
11	2	Folake Akinyemi	Norway	7.38	
12	2	Emma Rienas	Sweden	7.40	
13	1	Martina Giovanetti	Italy	7.41	
14	1	Angela Moroșanu	Romania	7.42	
14	2	Ayodelé Ikuesan	France	7.42	
16	2	Inna Eftimova	Bulgaria	7.45	

=== Final ===
Rank	Name	Nationality	React	Time	Notes
1st place, gold medalist(s)	Yevgeniya Polyakova	Russia	0.157	7.18	SB
2nd place, silver medalist(s)	Ezinne Okparaebo	Norway	0.145	7.21	NR
3rd place, bronze medalist(s)	Verena Sailer	Germany	0.159	7.22	
4	Anna Geflikh	Russia	0.173	7.25	
5	Lena Berntsson	Sweden	0.190	7.26	SB
6	Anita Pistone	Italy	0.161	7.33	
7	Lina Grinčikaitė	Lithuania	0.225	7.38	
8	Maria Aurora Salvagno	Italy	0.151	7.43	
