= 2010 IAAF World Indoor Championships – Women's 60 metres =

The women's 60 metres competition at the 2010 IAAF World Indoor Championships was held at the ASPIRE Dome on 12 and 14 March.

The race was expected to be a duel between LaVerne Jones-Ferrette and Carmelita Jeter who had run some of the fastest times for many seasons at 6.97 and 7.02 seconds, respectively. In the first round of competition Myriam Soumaré was the surprise winner of the first heat, Jones-Ferrette clocked the fastest of the day in her heat with 7.14 seconds, while Veronica Campbell-Brown and Jeter topped their qualifiers comfortably. Ruddy Zang Milama of Gabon was another surprise in the final heat as she beat the more experienced Sheri-Ann Brooks and Mikele Barber.

On the second day of competition, Campbell-Brown placed herself in contention for a medal with a 7.07 second run in the first semi-final, although Jones-Ferrette's time in the second semi was faster still. Brooks ran a personal best to beat Jeter in the last semi-final of the day. Among the other qualifiers, Zang Milama surprised further with 7.13-second national record to become the first Gabonese athlete to reach an indoor final in any event. Barber and reigning European 60 m champion Yevgeniya Polyakova were among the casualties of the round.

In the final, Campbell-Brown ran a personal best of 7.00 seconds – the fastest winning time for 11 year – to upset the pre-race favourites. Finishing just after in 7.03 seconds, Jones-Ferrette settled for silver – the first global athletics medal for the United States Virgin Islands. Jeter rounded out the top three with a run of 7.05 seconds, continuing her bronze medal run from the World Championships in Athletics. Zang Milama and Brooks shared fourth place having made significant career progressions over the distance. Chandra Sturrup's sixth-place finish was notable in that, at the age of 38 years, she was almost a decade older than the next oldest athlete to reach the final (Jeter).

Jones-Ferrette was later disqualified due to a doping infraction and banned for six months. The positions and medals were redistributed, with Jeter receiving the silver and Zang Milama taking the bronze medal.

== Medalists ==
Gold	Silver	Bronze
Veronica Campbell-Brown; Jamaica	Carmelita Jeter; United States	Ruddy Zang Milama; Gabon

== Records ==
Standing records prior to the 2010 IAAF World Indoor Championships
World record	Irina Privalova (RUS)	6.92	Madrid, Spain	11 February 1993
Championship record	Gail Devers (USA)	6.95	Toronto, Canada	12 March 1993
World Leading	LaVerne Jones-Ferrette (ISV)	6.97	Stuttgart, Germany	6 February 2010
African record	Christy Opara-Thompson (NGR)	7.02	Ghent, Belgium	12 February 1997
African record	Chioma Ajunwa (NGR)	7.02	Liévin, France	22 February 1998
Asian record	Susanthika Jayasinghe (SRI)	7.09	Stuttgart, Germany	17 February 1999
European record	Irina Privalova (RUS)	6.92	Madrid, Spain	11 February 1993
European record	Irina Privalova (RUS)	6.92	Madrid, Spain	9 February 1995
North and Central American and Caribbean record	Gail Devers (USA)	6.95	Toronto, Canada	12 March 1993
North and Central American and Caribbean record	Marion Jones (USA)	6.95	Maebashi, Japan	7 March 1998
Oceanian Record	Sally McLellan (AUS)	7.30	Boston, United States	7 February 2009
South American record	Esmeralda de Jesus Garcia (BRA)	7.26	Pocatello, United States	13 March 1981

== Qualification standards ==
Indoor	Outdoor
7.37	11.25 (100 m)

== Schedule ==
Date	Time	Round
March 12, 2010	18:25	Heats
March 14, 2010	16:00	Semifinals
March 14, 2010	18:10	Final

== Results ==
=== Heats ===
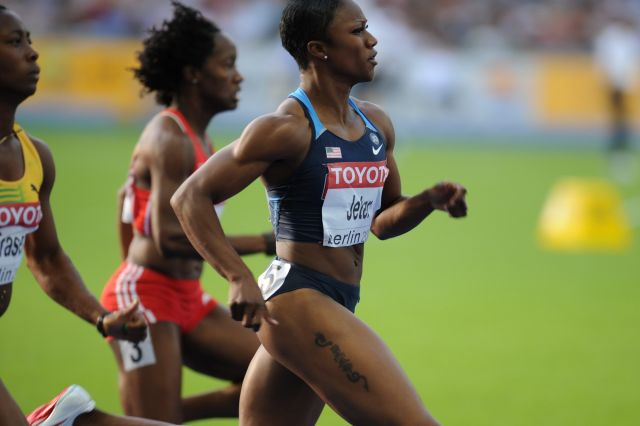
Carmelita Jeter topped her heat in 7.30 s

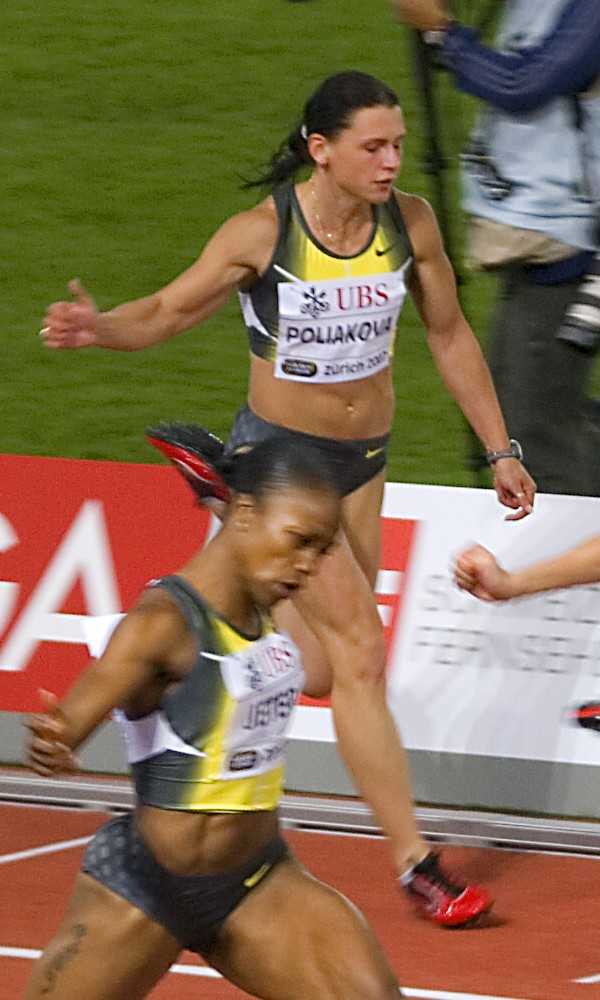
Yevgeniya Polyakova was one of the fastest through the first round

Qualification: First 4 in each heat (Q) and the next 4 fastest (q) advance to the semifinals.

Rank	Heat	Name	Nationality	Time	Notes
	3	LaVerne Jones-Ferrette	United States Virgin Islands	~~7.14~~	Q
1	2	Veronica Campbell-Brown	Jamaica	7.21	Q
2	1	Myriam Soumaré	France	7.22	Q
3	2	Chandra Sturrup	Bahamas	7.22	Q
4	1	Yevgeniya Polyakova	Russia	7.26	Q
5	1	Tahesia Harrigan	British Virgin Islands	7.26	Q, SB
6	3	Véronique Mang	France	7.27	Q
7	4	Carmelita Jeter	United States	7.30	Q
8	5	Ruddy Zang Milama	Gabon	7.31	Q
9	5	Sheri-Ann Brooks	Jamaica	7.32	Q
10	4	Yuliya Katsura	Russia	7.34	Q
11	3	Olesya Povh	Ukraine	7.37	Q
12	5	Mikele Barber	United States	7.37	Q
13	2	Yasmin Kwadwo	Germany	7.38	Q
14	4	Digna Luz Murillo	Spain	7.38	Q
15	3	Lena Berntsson	Sweden	7.39	Q
16	2	Maria Aurora Salvagno	Italy	7.41	Q
17	4	Ivet Lalova	Bulgaria	7.42	Q
18	5	Lina Grinčikaitė	Lithuania	7.42	Q
19	3	Claire Brady	Ireland	7.43	q
20	4	Emma Rienas	Sweden	7.45	q
21	5	Folake Akinyemi	Norway	7.45	q
22	1	Joice Maduaka	Great Britain	7.46	Q
23	2	Mariya Ryemyen	Ukraine	7.46	q
24	2	Marika Popowicz	Poland	7.56	
25	1	Tatjana Mitić	Serbia	7.57	
26	4	Virgil Hodge	Saint Kitts and Nevis	7.61	SB
27	4	Gloria Diogo	São Tomé and Príncipe	7.89	SB
28	2	Norjannah Hafiszah Jamaludin	Malaysia	7.90	NR, PB
29	1	Martina Pretelli	San Marino	7.94	
30	5	Yelena Ryabova	Turkmenistan	8.27	
31	3	Hawwa Haneefa	Maldives	8.31	PB
32	5	Angie Mangion	Malta	8.33	PB
33	1	Yvette Bennett	Northern Mariana Islands	8.68	PB
	3	Ahamada Feta	Comoros	DQ	

=== Semifinals ===
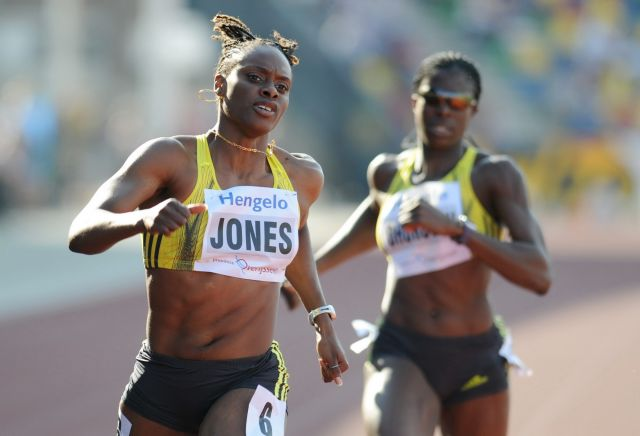
LaVerne Jones-Ferrette ran the fastest time for both qualifying rounds

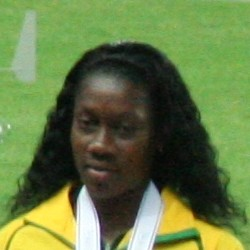
Sheri-Ann Brooks ran a new best to win her semi-final.

Qualification: First 2 in each heat (Q) and the next 2 fastest (q) advance to the final.

Rank	Heat	Name	Nationality	Time	Notes
	2	LaVerne Jones-Ferrette	United States Virgin Islands	~~7.05~~	Q
1	1	Veronica Campbell-Brown	Jamaica	7.07	Q, SB
2	1	Ruddy Zang Milama	Gabon	7.13	Q, NR
3	3	Sheri-Ann Brooks	Jamaica	7.14	Q, PB
4	3	Carmelita Jeter	United States	7.15	Q
5	2	Chandra Sturrup	Bahamas	7.20	Q, SB
6	3	Myriam Soumaré	France	7.21	q
7	1	Tahesia Harrigan	British Virgin Islands	7.22	q, SB
8	2	Mikele Barber	United States	7.24	
9	2	Yevgeniya Polyakova	Russia	7.24	
10	1	Véronique Mang	France	7.28	
11	3	Digna Luz Murillo	Spain	7.33	
12	2	Lina Grinčikaitė	Lithuania	7.34	
13	1	Joice Maduaka	Great Britain	7.35	
14	3	Yuliya Katsura	Russia	7.38	
15	1	Emma Rienas	Sweden	7.38	
16	1	Yasmin Kwadwo	Germany	7.39	
17	3	Claire Brady	Ireland	7.40	
18	2	Ivet Lalova	Bulgaria	7.41	
19	3	Mariya Ryemyen	Ukraine	7.41	
20	3	Lena Berntsson	Sweden	7.41	
21	2	Olesya Povh	Ukraine	7.45	
22	2	Folake Akinyemi	Norway	7.47	
23	1	Maria Aurora Salvagno	Italy	7.49	

=== Final ===
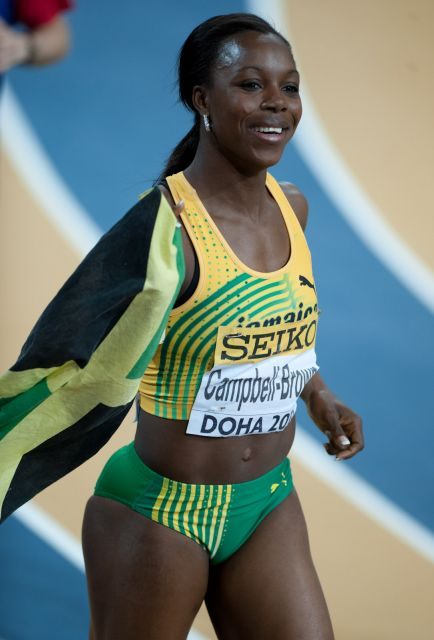
Campbell-Brown celebrating her gold medal performance for Jamaica

Rank	Name	Nationality	Time	Notes
1st place, gold medalist(s)	Veronica Campbell-Brown	Jamaica	7.00	PB
DQ	LaVerne Jones-Ferrette	United States Virgin Islands	~~7.03~~	
2nd place, silver medalist(s)	Carmelita Jeter	United States	7.05	
3rd place, bronze medalist(s)	Ruddy Zang Milama	Gabon	7.14	
3rd place, bronze medalist(s)	Sheri-Ann Brooks	Jamaica	7.14	PB
5	Chandra Sturrup	Bahamas	7.16	SB
6	Tahesia Harrigan	British Virgin Islands	7.17	SB
7	Myriam Soumaré	France	7.29	
