= 2007 World Championships in Athletics – Women's 100 metres =

These are the official results of the women's 100 metres event at the 2007 World Championships in Athletics in Osaka, Japan. There were a total number of 74 participating athletes, with eight qualifying heats and the final held on Monday August 27.

== Medalists ==
Gold	Veronica Campbell; Jamaica (JAM)
Silver	Lauryn Williams; United States (USA)
Bronze	Carmelita Jeter; United States (USA)

== Records ==
World Record	Florence Griffith Joyner (USA)	10.49	Indianapolis, United States	16 July 1988
Championship Record	Marion Jones (USA)	10.70	Seville, Spain	22 August 1999

== Results ==
=== Heats ===
First 3 of each Heat qualifies (Q) plus the 8 fastest non-direct qualifiers (q) reached the Quarterfinals.

==== Heat 1 ====
Rank	Lane	Athlete	Nation	Time (sec)	Notes
1	9	Carmelita Jeter	United States	11.07	Q
2	2	Kim Gevaert	Belgium	11.09	Q, SB
3	4	Susanthika Jayasinghe	Sri Lanka	11.13	Q, SB
4	7	Merlene Ottey	Slovenia	11.64	
5	3	Inna Eftimova	Bulgaria	11.66	
6	8	Nataliya Pohrebnyak	Ukraine	11.71	
7	5	Fatou Tiyana	Gambia	12.44	PB
8	6	Jenny Keni	Solomon Islands	13.31	

==== Heat 2 ====
Rank	Lane	Athlete	Nation	Time (sec)	Notes
1	5	Veronica Campbell	Jamaica	11.33	Q
2	8	Laura Turner	Great Britain & N.I.	11.43	Q
3	3	Lucimar Aparecida de Moura	Brazil	11.49	Q
4	1	Mae Koime	Papua New Guinea	11.64	
5	4	Anastasiya Vinogradova	Kazakhstan	11.74	
6	6	Marestella Torres	Philippines	12.44	PB
7	7	Yvonne Bennett	Northern Mariana Islands	13.16	NR
8	2	Shokhida Ziyaeva	Tajikistan	13.16	
9	9	Aleksandra Vojneska	Macedonia	13.24	

==== Heat 3 ====
Rank	Lane	Athlete	Nation	Time (sec)	Notes
1	2	Sally McLellan	Australia	11.14	Q, PB
2	5	Tezzhan Naimova	Bulgaria	11.15	Q
3	7	Tahesia Harrigan	British Virgin Islands	11.26	Q
4	4	Affoue Amandine Allou	Ivory Coast	11.27	q, PB
5	9	Verena Sailer	Germany	11.33	q
6	1	Valentina Nazarova	Turkmenistan	12.02	SB
7	8	Charlene Attard	Malta	12.06	
8	6	Selloane Tsoaeli	Lesotho	13.29	PB
9	3	Sry Hang	Cambodia	13.55	

==== Heat 4 ====
Rank	Lane	Athlete	Nation	Time (sec)	Notes
1	3	Christine Arron	France	11.27	Q
2	7	Debbie Ferguson-McKenzie	Bahamas	11.36	Q
3	6	Ivet Lalova	Bulgaria	11.47	Q
4	9	Irina Khabarova	Russia	11.49	q
5	4	Nombulelo Constance Mkenku	South Africa	11.50	q
6	2	Momoko Takahashi	Japan	11.98	
7	5	Barbara Rustignoli	San Marino	13.33	SB
8	8	Maria Ikelap	Micronesia	13.93	SB

==== Heat 5 ====
Rank	Lane	Athlete	Nation	Time (sec)	Notes
1	7	Chandra Sturrup	Bahamas	11.32	Q
2	6	Kerron Stewart	Jamaica	11.35	Q
3	4	Sasha Springer	Trinidad and Tobago	11.50	Q
4	8	Guzel Khubbieva	Uzbekistan	11.59	
5	9	Carima Louami	France	11.59	
6	2	Gloria Diogo	São Tomé and Príncipe	12.21	SB
7	3	Sze-Min Choo	Singapore	12.29	SB
8	5	Loi Ieong	Macau	12.76	SB
9	1	Fathia Ali Bouraleh	Djibouti	14.14	

==== Heat 6 ====
Rank	Lane	Athlete	Nation	Time (sec)	Notes
1	2	Mechelle Lewis	United States	11.16	Q
2	4	Sheri-Ann Brooks	Jamaica	11.29	Q
3	1	Montell Douglas	Great Britain & N.I.	11.39	Q
4	9	Daria Korczyńska	Poland	11.41	q
5	3	Ekaterina Grigorieva	Russia	11.44	q
6	7	Kin Yee Wan	Hong Kong	12.12	
7	5	Elis Lapenmal	Vanuatu	13.10	PB
8	8	Lilly Pine	Kiribati	13.86	PB
9	6	Waseelah Fadhl Saad	Yemen	14.31	SB

==== Heat 7 ====
Rank	Lane	Athlete	Nation	Time (sec)	Notes
1	9	Yevgeniya Polyakova	Russia	11.30	Q
2	7	Lauryn Williams	United States	11.41	Q
3	6	Johanna Manninen	Finland	11.52	Q
4	3	Paulette Zang-Milama	Gabon	11.53	
5	2	Myriam Leonie Mani	Cameroon	11.55	
6	8	Tamicka Clarke	Bahamas	11.59	
7	5	Florence Dembert	Chad	13.01	PB
8	4	Fatima Mohammadi	Afghanistan	16.17	PB

==== Heat 8 ====
Rank	Lane	Athlete	Nation	Time (sec)	Notes
1	4	Torri Edwards	United States	11.14	Q
2	7	Oludamola Osayomi	Nigeria	11.15	Q, PB
3	6	Vida Anim	Ghana	11.22	Q, SB
4	3	Jeanette Kwakye	Great Britain & N.I.	11.26	q, PB
5	1	Sherry Fletcher	Grenada	11.28	q
6	5	Milena Milašević	Montenegro	12.24	NR
7	2	Rosa Mystique Jones	Nauru	12.69	SB
8	9	Felicia Saburo	Palau	13.40	PB
9	8	Bounkou Camara	Mauritania	13.93	SB

=== Quarterfinals ===
First 4 of each Quarterfinal qualified (Q) for the Semifinals.

==== Heat 1 ====
Rank	Lane	Athlete	Nation	Time (sec)	Notes
1	4	Torri Edwards	United States	11.13	Q
2	7	Kerron Stewart	Jamaica	11.20	Q
3	5	Oludamola Osayomi	Nigeria	11.21	Q
4	6	Yevgeniya Polyakova	Russia	11.24	Q
5	3	Sherry Fletcher	Grenada	11.32	
6	8	Tahesia Harrigan	British Virgin Islands	11.33	
7	2	Lucimar Aparecida de Moura	Brazil	11.61	
-	9	Nombulelo Constance Mkenku	South Africa	DNS	

==== Heat 2 ====
Rank	Lane	Athlete	Nation	Time (sec)	Notes
1	6	Veronica Campbell	Jamaica	11.08	Q
2	4	Kim Gevaert	Belgium	11.15	Q
3	7	Carmelita Jeter	United States	11.17	Q
4	5	Laura Turner	Great Britain & N.I.	11.32	Q
5	3	Irina Khabarova	Russia	11.38	SB
6	8	Affoue Amandine Allou	Ivory Coast	11.57	
-	2	Susanthika Jayasinghe	Sri Lanka	DSQ	
-	9	Johanna Manninen	Finland	DSQ	

==== Heat 3 ====
Rank	Lane	Athlete	Nation	Time (sec)	Notes
1	6	Christine Arron	France	11.17	Q
2	7	Sheri-Ann Brooks	Jamaica	11.23	Q
3	5	Mechelle Lewis	United States	11.25	Q
4	4	Debbie Ferguson-McKenzie	Bahamas	11.29	Q
5	9	Ivet Lalova	Bulgaria	11.33	
6	2	Montell Douglas	Great Britain & N.I.	11.43	
7	3	Verena Sailer	Germany	11.43	
8	8	Daria Korczyńska	Poland	11.44	

==== Heat 4 ====
Rank	Lane	Athlete	Nation	Time (sec)	Notes
1	7	Chandra Sturrup	Bahamas	11.15	Q, SB
2	6	Lauryn Williams	United States	11.16	Q
3	4	Tezzhan Naimova	Bulgaria	11.21	Q
4	5	Sally McLellan	Australia	11.31	Q
5	9	Vida Anim	Ghana	11.36	
6	8	Jeanette Kwakye	Great Britain & N.I.	11.40	
7	2	Ekaterina Grigorieva	Russia	11.49	
8	3	Sasha Springer	Trinidad and Tobago	11.56	

=== Semifinals ===
First 4 of each Semifinal qualified (Q) for the final.

==== Heat 1 ====
Rank	Lane	Name	Nationality	Time	Notes
1	7	Torri Edwards	United States	11.02	Q
2	5	Lauryn Williams	United States	11.09	Q, SB
3	4	Kerron Stewart	Jamaica	11.12	Q
4	3	Oludamola Osayomi	Nigeria	11.18	Q
5	2	Tezzhan Naimova	Bulgaria	11.18	
6	6	Chandra Sturrup	Bahamas	11.22	
7	9	Laura Turner	Great Britain & N.I.	11.32	
8	8	Sally McLellan	Australia	11.32	

==== Heat 2 ====
Rank	Lane	Name	Nationality	Time	Notes
1	7	Veronica Campbell	Jamaica	10.99	Q
2	6	Christine Arron	France	11.04	Q, SB
3	5	Kim Gevaert	Belgium	11.06	Q, SB
4	3	Carmelita Jeter	United States	11.08	Q
5	8	Mechelle Lewis	United States	11.16	
6	2	Yevgeniya Polyakova	Russia	11.16	
7	4	Sheri-Ann Brooks	Jamaica	11.21	
8	9	Debbie Ferguson-McKenzie	Bahamas	11.25	

=== Final ===
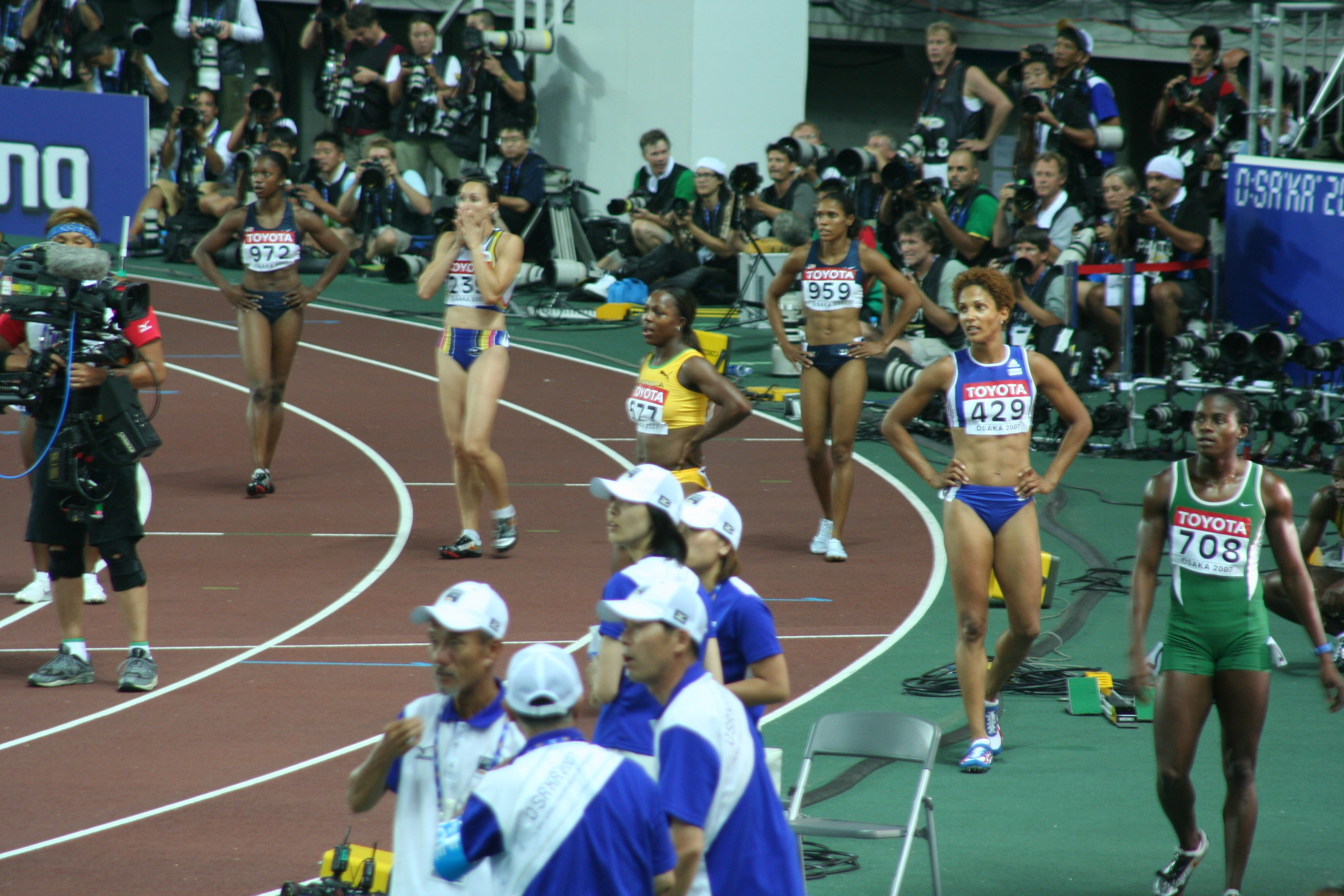
After the final

Rank	Athlete	Nation	Time	Notes
1st place, gold medalist(s)	Veronica Campbell	Jamaica	11.01	
2nd place, silver medalist(s)	Lauryn Williams	United States	11.01	SB
3rd place, bronze medalist(s)	Carmelita Jeter	United States	11.02	PB
4	Torri Edwards	United States	11.05	
5	Kim Gevaert	Belgium	11.05	SB
6	Christine Arron	France	11.08	
7	Kerron Stewart	Jamaica	11.12	
8	Oludamola Osayomi	Nigeria	11.26	
