= Johanna Manninen =

Finnish sprinter (born 1980)

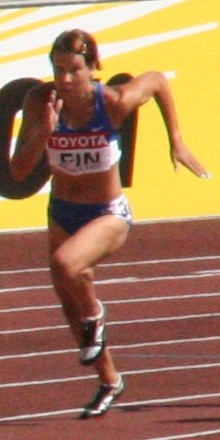
- Johanna Manninen in 2007.

Personal information
- Full name: Johanna Katriina Manninen
- Nationality: Finland
- Born: 4 April 1980 (age 46) Nurmo, Finland
- Height: 1.70 m (5 ft 7 in)
- Weight: 58 kg (128 lb)

Sport
- Sport: Athletics
- Event(s): 100 m, 200 m
Medal record
Universiade
Gold medal – first place	2007 Bangkok	100m
Gold medal – first place	2007 Bangkok	4×100m

Johanna Katriina Manninen (born 4 April 1980) is a Finnish former athlete specializing in sprinting events. She won two gold medals at the 2007 Summer Universiade, in addition to several medals in younger age categories.

== Biography ==
She competed at 3 Olympic Games, 1996 Summer Olympics, 2000 Summer Olympics and 2004 Summer Olympics.

== Achievements ==
Year	Competition	Venue	Position	Event	Notes
Representing Finland
1996	World Junior Championships	Sydney, Australia	11th (sf)	100m	11.76
1996	World Junior Championships	Sydney, Australia	8th	200m	23.89 (wind: -2.2 m/s)
1996	World Junior Championships	Sydney, Australia	—	4 × 100 m relay	DQ
1996	Olympic Games	Atlanta, United States	11th (sf)	4 × 100 m relay	44.21
1997	European Junior Championships	Ljubljana, Slovenia	1st	100 m	11.39
1997	European Junior Championships	Ljubljana, Slovenia	3rd	200 m	23.43
1997	World Championships	Athens, Greece	36th (h)	100 m	11.59
1997	World Championships	Athens, Greece	13th (h)	4 × 100 m relay	44.08
1998	World Junior Championships	Annecy, France	8th (sf)	100m	11.75 (wind: +1.1 m/s)
1998	World Junior Championships	Annecy, France	4th	200m	23.68 (wind: -1.1 m/s)
1998	World Junior Championships	Annecy, France	4th (h)	4 × 100 m relay	45.36
1998	European Championships	Budapest, Hungary	28th (h)	100 m	11.94
1998	European Championships	Budapest, Hungary	27th (h)	200 m	24.10
1998	European Championships	Budapest, Hungary	6th	4 × 100 m relay	44.10
1999	European Junior Championships	Riga, Latvia	2nd	100 m	11.47
1999	European Junior Championships	Riga, Latvia	2nd	200 m	23.26
1999	European Junior Championships	Riga, Latvia	2nd	4 × 100 m relay	44.40
1999	World Championships	Seville, Spain	24th (qf)	100 m	11.45
1999	World Championships	Seville, Spain	10th (h)	4 × 100 m relay	43.86
2000	European Indoor Championships	Ghent, Belgium	21st (h)	60 m	7.40
2000	European Indoor Championships	Ghent, Belgium	12th (sf)	200 m	23.83
2000	Olympic Games	Sydney, Australia	27th (sf)	200 m	23.41
2000	Olympic Games	Sydney, Australia	12th (sf)	4 × 100 m relay	43.50
2001	European U23 Championships	Amsterdam, Netherlands	1st	100 m	11.61 (wind: -1.2 m/s)
2001	European U23 Championships	Amsterdam, Netherlands	1st	200 m	23.30 (wind: -0.3 m/s)
2001	European U23 Championships	Amsterdam, Netherlands	1st	4 × 100 m relay	44.76
2001	World Championships	Edmonton, Canada	12th (sf)	100 m	11.46
2001	World Championships	Edmonton, Canada	15th (sf)	200 m	23.11
2002	European Championships	Munich, Germany	20th (h)	100 m	11.58
2002	European Championships	Munich, Germany	16th (h)	200 m	23.47
2003	World Indoor Championships	Birmingham, United Kingdom	13th (sf)	60 m	7.26
2003	World Championships	Paris, France	23rd (qf)	200 m	23.42
2004	World Indoor Championships	Budapest, Hungary	13th (sf)	60 m	7.30
2004	World Indoor Championships	Budapest, Hungary	10th (h)	200 m	23.79
2004	Olympic Games	Athens, Greece	34th (h)	100 m	11.45
2004	Olympic Games	Athens, Greece	35th (h)	200 m	23.45
2005	European Indoor Championships	Madrid, Spain	11th (sf)	60 m	7.32
2006	European Championships	Gothenburg, Sweden	11th (h)	4 × 100 m relay	44.32
2007	European Indoor Championships	Birmingham, United Kingdom	5th (sf)	60 m	7.24
2007	Universiade	Bangkok, Thailand	1st	100 m	11.46
2007	Universiade	Bangkok, Thailand	1st	4 × 100 m relay	43.48
2007	World Championships	Osaka, Japan	32nd (h)	100 m	11.52
2007	World Championships	Osaka, Japan	10th (h)	4 × 100 m relay	43.41

== Personal bests ==
Outdoor

- 100 metres – 11.27 (+1.2 m/s) (Vaasa 2007)
- 200 metres – 22.93 (-0.7 m/s) (Edmonton 2001)
- 400 metres – 54.86 (Bratislava 2002)

Indoor

- 50 metres – 6.32 (Liévin 2003)
- 60 metres – 7.22 (Stuttgart 2003)
- 200 metres – 23.28 (Liévin 2003)
