= Heidi Hannula =

Finnish sprinter (born 1980)

Personal information
- Born: 26 February 1980 (age 46) Oulu, Finland
- Height: 1.64 m (5 ft 5 in)
- Weight: 55 kg (121 lb)

Sport
- Sport: Athletics
- Event(s): 60 metres, 100 metres
- Club: Oulun Pyrintö

Heidi Johanna Hannula (born 26 February 1980 in Oulu) is a retired Finnish athlete who specialised in the sprinting events. She represented her country at the 2000 Summer Olympics, as well as three outdoor and one indoor World Championships.

== Competition record ==
Year	Competition	Venue	Position	Event	Notes
Representing Finland
1997	European Junior Championships	Ljubljana, Slovenia	12th (h)	100 m	12.14
1997	European Junior Championships	Ljubljana, Slovenia	6th	4 × 100 m relay	45.36
1998	World Junior Championships	Annecy, France	23rd (qf)	100 m	12.19
1998	World Junior Championships	Annecy, France	4th (h)	4 × 100 m relay	45.36
1998	European Championships	Budapest, Hungary	6th	4 × 100 m relay	44.10
1999	European Junior Championships	Riga, Latvia	5th	100 m	11.72
1999	European Junior Championships	Riga, Latvia	15th (h)	200 m	24.36
1999	European Junior Championships	Riga, Latvia	2nd	4 × 100 m relay	44.40
1999	World Championships	Seville, Spain	10th (h)	4 × 100 m relay	43.86
2000	Olympic Games	Sydney, Australia	49th (h)	100 m	11.68
2000	Olympic Games	Sydney, Australia	12th (sf)	4 × 100 m relay	43.50
2001	European U23 Championships	Amsterdam, Netherlands	5th	100 m	11.71
2001	European U23 Championships	Amsterdam, Netherlands	3rd	4 × 100 m relay	44.76
2003	Universiade	Daegu, South Korea	5th	100 m	11.75
2003	Universiade	Daegu, South Korea	5th (sf)	200 m	24.60
2005	European Indoor Championships	Madrid, Spain	8th	60 m	7.44
2005	World Championships	Helsinki, Finland	23rd (qf)	100 m	11.52
2005	World Championships	Helsinki, Finland	–	4 × 100 m relay	DNF
2006	World Indoor Championships	Moscow, Russia	10th (sf)	60 m	7.26
2006	European Championships	Gothenburg, Sweden	24th (h)	100 m	11.64
2006	European Championships	Gothenburg, Sweden	11th (h)	4 × 100 m relay	44.32
2007	Universiade	Bangkok, Thailand	14th (sf)	100 m	12.01
2007	Universiade	Bangkok, Thailand	1st	4 × 100 m relay	43.48
2007	World Championships	Osaka, Japan	10th (h)	4 × 100 m relay	43.41

== Personal bests ==
Outdoor

- 100 metres – 11.49 (+1.7 m/s) (Lahti 2000)
- 200 metres – 24.71 (-0.4 m/s) (Helsinki 1999)

Indoor

- 60 metres – 7.24 (Moscow 2006)
