= Daria Korczyńska =

Polish sprinter (born 1981)

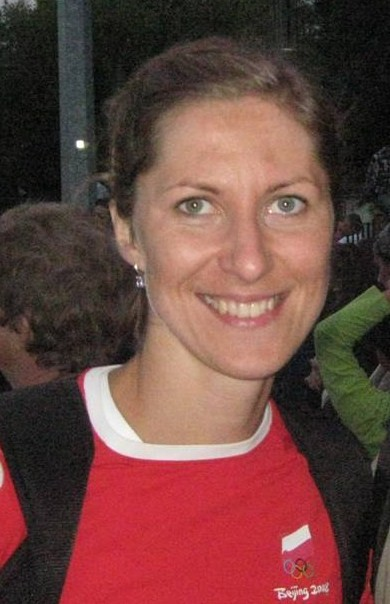
- Daria Korczyńska in 2010

Personal information
- Full name: Daria Onyśko-Korczyńska
- Nationality: Poland
- Born: Daria Onyśko; 30 July 1981 (age 44) Kołobrzeg, Poland
- Height: 1.68 m (5 ft 6 in)
- Weight: 60 kg (132 lb) (2012)

Sport
- Sport: Athletics
- Event: 100 m
- Club: WKS Śląsk Wrocław
Medal record
Women's athletics
Representing Poland
European Championships
Bronze medal – third place	2010 Barcelona	4 × 100 m
Bronze medal – third place	2012 Helsinki	4 × 100 m
European Indoor Championships
Bronze medal – third place	2007 Birmingham	60 m

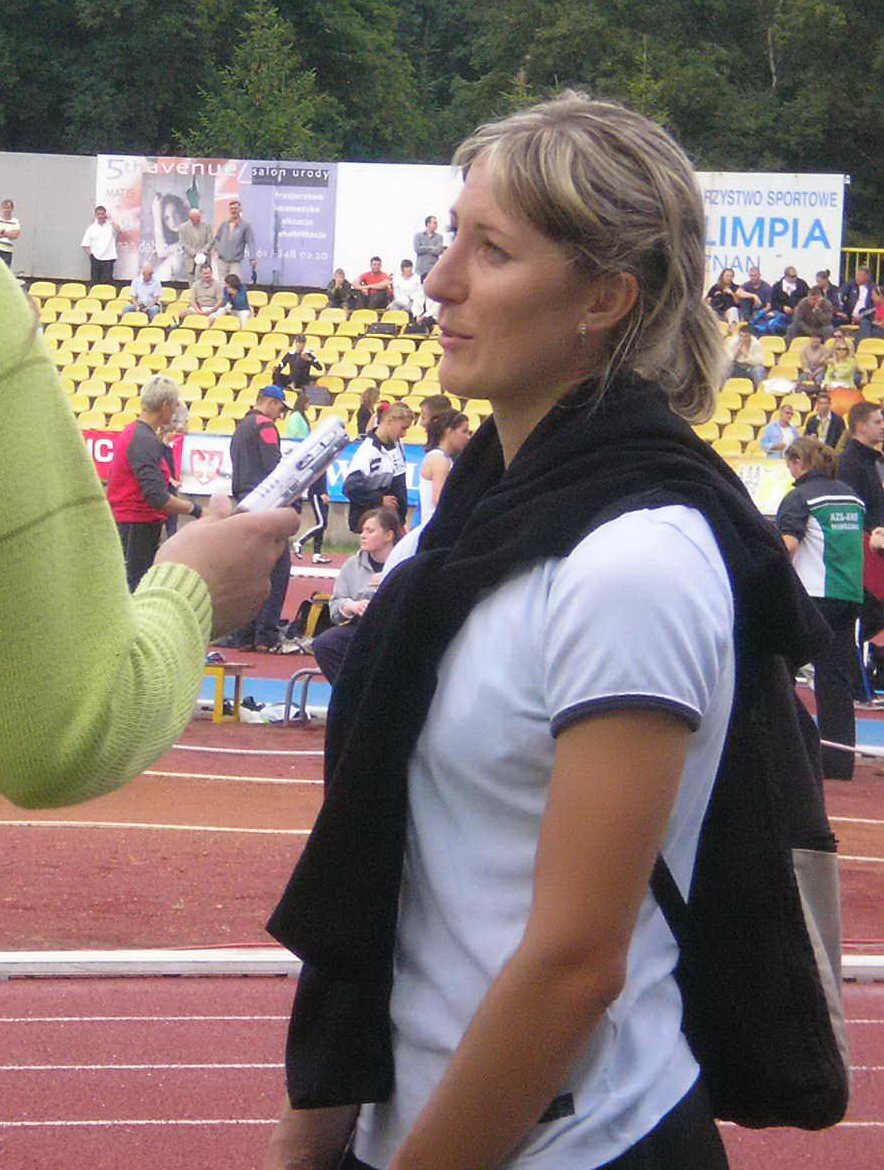
Daria Onyśko-Korczyńska

Daria Onyśko-Korczyńska (born 30 July 1981 in Kołobrzeg) is a retired track and field sprint athlete who competed internationally for Poland.

She finished eighth in the 100 metres final at the 2006 European Athletics Championships in Gothenburg, and ninth one month later at the 2006 IAAF World Cup. She won the bronze medal in 60 metres at the 2007 European Indoor Championships.

Korczynska represented Poland at the 2008 Summer Olympics in Beijing. She competed at the 100 metres sprint and placed third in her first round heat after Oludamola Osayomi and Debbie Ferguson in a time of 11.22 seconds. She qualified for the second round in which she failed to qualify for the semi-finals as her time of 11.41 was the fifth time of her race. Together with Ewelina Klocek, Dorota Jędrusińska and Marta Jeschke she also took part in the 4 × 100 metres relay. In their first round heat they placed fifth behind Belgium, Great Britain, Brazil and Nigeria. Their time of 43.47 seconds was the second best non-directly qualifying time and the seventh time overall out of sixteen participating nations. With this result they qualified for the final in which they replaced Jeschke with Joanna Henryka Kocielnik. In the final they were eventually disqualified.

She won the bronze medal with the Polish 4 × 100 metres relay at the 2010 European Athletics Championships.

She was part of the Polish 4 × 100 m team at the 2012 Summer Olympics.

== Competition record ==
Year	Competition	Venue	Position	Event	Notes
Representing Poland
2002	European Championships	Munich, Germany	7th	4 × 100 m relay	43.96
2003	European U23 Championships	Bydgoszcz, Poland	2nd	100 m	11.46 (+1.3 m/s)
2003	European U23 Championships	Bydgoszcz, Poland	2nd	4 × 100 m relay	44.51
2005	European Indoor Championships	Madrid, Spain	14th (sf)	60 m	7.35
2005	World Championships	Helsinki, Finland	8th	4 × 100 m relay	43.49
2006	European Championships	Gothenburg, Sweden	8th	100 m	11.43
2006	European Championships	Gothenburg, Sweden	10th (h)	4 × 100 m relay	44.27
2007	European Indoor Championships	Birmingham, United Kingdom	3rd	60 m	7.20
2007	World Championships	Osaka, Japan	25th (qf)	100 m	11.43
2007	World Championships	Osaka, Japan	8th	4 × 100 m relay	43.57
2008	Olympic Games	Beijing, China	21st (qf)	100 m	11.41
2008	Olympic Games	Beijing, China	8th	4 × 100 m relay	DQ
2010	European Championships	Barcelona, Spain	3rd	4 × 100 m relay	42.68
2012	European Championships	Helsinki, Finland	10th (sf)	100 m	11.43
2012	European Championships	Helsinki, Finland	3rd	4 × 100 m relay	43.06
2012	Olympic Games	London, United Kingdom	9th (h)	4 × 100 m relay	43.07

== Personal bests ==
- 100 metres - 11.22 s (2008)
- 200 metres - 23.17 s (2008)
