= Claire Brady (athlete) =

Irish short-distance runner

Claire Brady is an Irish short-distance runner.

Brady was born in Kildare and represents Celbridge Athletic Club in domestic competitions. She represented Dublin City University at college level, winning two indoor gold medals at 60 metres, one outdoor 100 metres gold, two outdoor gold medals at 200m and one gold at the 4 x 100 metres relay, setting a new Irish university record.

Brady represented Ireland at the 2009 European Athletics U23 Championships in the 100 metres but failed to win a medal. She qualified for the 2010 IAAF World Indoor Championships in Doha, Qatar, at the Women's 60 metres, advancing past the heats in 7.43 seconds. The semi-finals and final took place on 14 March 2010.
