= Iryna Shtanhyeyeva =

Ukrainian sprinter

Iryna Shtanhyeyeva (born 8 February 1982) is a Ukrainian sprint athlete who specializes in the 200 metres.

In individual competition she competed at the 2007 European Indoor Championships and the 2007 World Championships without reaching the final, but she won the gold medal at the 2007 Summer Universiade. Here she also won a bronze medal in the 4 x 400 metres relay.

She also competed in relay at the 2005 World Championships without reaching the final. At the 2007 World Championships the Ukrainian team failed to finish the race.

Her personal best times are 7.24 seconds in the 60 metres (indoor), achieved in January 2004 in Zaporizhia; 11.31 seconds in the 100 metres, achieved in May 2005 in Donetsk; and 22.72 seconds in the 200 metres, achieved in June 2007 in Yalta.

== Competition record ==
Year	Competition	Venue	Position	Event	Notes
Representing Ukraine
2005	World Championships	Helsinki, Finland	10th (h)	4 × 100 m relay	43.62
2006	European Championships	Gothenburg, Sweden	4th	4 × 100 m relay	43.97
2007	European Indoor Championships	Birmingham, United Kingdom	25th (h)	60 m	7.40
2007	Universiade	Bangkok, Thailand	1st	200 m	22.95
2007	Universiade	Bangkok, Thailand	3rd	4 × 100 m relay	43.99
2007	World Championships	Osaka, Japan	20th (qf)	200 m	23.17
2007	World Championships	Osaka, Japan	–	4 × 100 m relay	DNF
