= Véronique Mang =

French sprinter

Véronique Ngo Mang
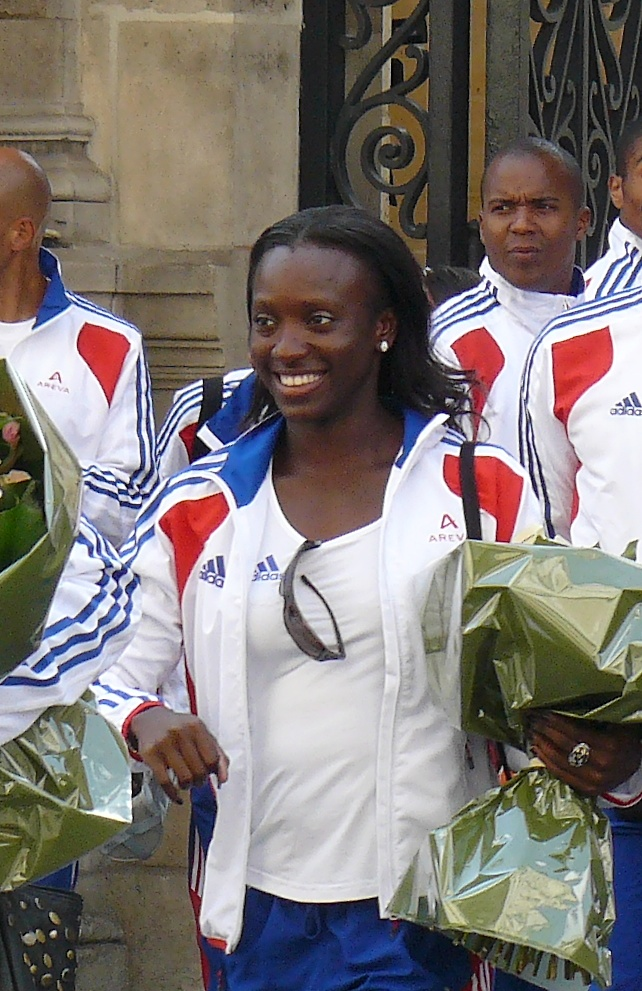

Personal information
- Nationality: France
- Born: December 15, 1984 (age 41) Douala, Cameroon
- Height: 173 cm (5 ft 8 in)
- Weight: 63 kg (139 lb)

Sport
- Sport: Running
- Event: 100 metres

Achievements and titles
- Personal best(s): 100m: 11.11 s (Barcelona 2010); 200m: 22.92 s (Geneva 2004)
Medal record
Women's Athletics
Representing France
Olympic Games
Bronze medal – third place	2004 Athens	4 × 100 m relay
European Championships
Silver medal – second place	2010 Barcelona	100 metres
Silver medal – second place	2010 Barcelona	4 × 100 m relay
Mediterranean Games
Gold medal – first place	2005 Almería	100 metres
Gold medal – first place	2005 Almería	4 × 100 m relay
Jeux de la Francophonie
Gold medal – first place	2005 Niamey	100 metres
Gold medal – first place	2005 Niamey	4 × 100 m relay

Véronique Ngo Mang (born December 15, 1984) is a track and field sprint athlete, competing internationally for France.

== Biography ==
She arrived in France with her mother, brother and sister in 1995. She represented Cameroon until 2003 when she gained French citizenship. She started running at age 12 in France. She suffered a strained leg muscle in 2000 and a knee injury in 2001.

She won the bronze medal in the 4 × 100 m relay at the 2004 Olympic Games in Athens, Greece.

She competed at the 2005 Mediterranean Games in the 100 metres which was held at Almería. She went on to win gold, 0.02 ahead of compatriot Sylviane Félix. She later teamed up with Félix, Lina Jacques-Sebastien and Fabé Dia to win the 4 × 100 metres relay

She also competed at the 2005 Jeux de la Francophonie, in Niamey. She went on to claim gold in the 100 metre event, compatriot Fabienne Beret-Martinel claimed bronze. She also won gold in the 4 × 100 metres relay with Beret-Martinel, Aurelie Kamga and Carima Louami.

Mang competed at the 2006 European Athletics Championships in the 100 metres and 4 × 100 metres relay. Despite being considered a medal contender, she only managed to reach the semi-final stage in the 100 metres. In the relay, she teamed up with Fabienne Beret-Martinel, Adrianna Lamalle and Muriel Hurtis-Houairi. The French women ran an impressive heat and were the fastest qualifiers in a time of 43.38. In the final, they did not finish the race due to a failed baton exchange.

In June 2013, she ruptured a tendon, preventing her from competing for 12 months.

She retired in 2016. Her hobbies are music, dancing and collecting postcards.
