= Dorota Jędrusińska =

Polish sprinter (born 1982)

Personal information
- Nationality: Poland
- Born: 4 February 1982 (age 44) Mielec, Poland

Sport
- Sport: Athletics
- Club: KS AZS AWF Kraków
Medal record
Women's athletics
Representing Poland
Universiade
Bronze medal – third place	2009 Belgrad	4 × 100 m relay

Dorota Jędrusińska, née Dydo (born 4 February 1982 in Mielec) is a track and field sprint athlete who competes internationally for Poland. She is married to a fellow Polish sprinter Marcin Jędrusiński.

Jędrusińska represented Poland at the 2008 Summer Olympics in Beijing. She competed at the 4 × 100 metres relay together with Daria Korczyńska, Ewelina Klocek and Marta Jeschke. In their first round heat they placed fifth behind Belgium, Great Britain, Brazil, and Nigeria. Their time of 43.47 seconds was the second best non-directly qualifying time and the seventh time overall out of sixteen participating nations. With this result they qualified for the final in which they replaced Jeschke with Joanna Henryka Kocielnik. In the final they were eventually disqualified.

== Major competitions record ==
Year	Competition	Venue	Position	Event	Notes
Representing Poland
1999	World Youth Championships	Bydgoszcz, Poland	3rd	4 × 100 m relay	45.49
2000	World Junior Championships	Santiago, Chile	4th	4 × 400 m relay	3:36.11
2002	European Championships	Munich, Germany	7th	4 × 100 m relay	43.96
2003	European U23 Championships	Bydgoszcz, Poland	3rd	200 m	23.34 (wind: 1.0 m/s)
2003	European U23 Championships	Bydgoszcz, Poland	2nd	4 × 100 m relay	44.51
2005	World Championships	Helsinki, Finland	8th	4 × 100 m relay	43.49
2006	European Championships	Gothenburg, Sweden	22nd (h)	100 m	11.61
2007	European Indoor Championships	Birmingham, United Kingdom	21st (h)	60 m	7.35
2007	World Championships	Osaka, Japan	8th	4 × 100 m relay	43.57
2008	Olympic Games	Beijing, China	8th	4 × 100 m relay	DQ
2009	Universiade	Belgrade, Serbia	2nd	4 × 100 m relay	43.96
2009	World Championships	Berlin, Germany	9th (h)	4 × 100 m relay	43.63
