= Iryna Shepetyuk =

Ukrainian sprinter

Iryna Lyubomyrivna Shepetyuk (Ukrainian: Ірина Любомирівна Шепетюк; born 13 February 1982) is a Ukrainian sprint athlete who specializes in the 100 metres.

She was born in Kolomiya, and represents the club Dynamo Ivano-Frankivska. In the 4 x 400 metres relay she won a bronze medal at the 2007 Summer Universiade. She also competed at the 2005 World Championships without reaching the final, The Ukrainian team failed to finish the race at the 2007 World Championships, and was disqualified at the 2008 Olympic Games.

Her personal best times are 7.35 seconds in the 60 metres (indoor), achieved in February 2004 in Sumy; 11.37 seconds in the 100 metres, achieved in May 2004 in Kyiv; and 23.31 seconds in the 200 metres, achieved in July 2004 in Kyiv.

== Competition record ==
Year	Competition	Venue	Position	Event	Notes
Representing Ukraine
2003	European U23 Championships	Bydgoszcz, Poland	15th (h)	100m	11.85 (wind: 0.4 m/s)
2003	European U23 Championships	Bydgoszcz, Poland	1st	4 × 100 m relay	44.29
2005	World Championships	Helsinki, Finland	10th (h)	4 × 100 m relay	43.62
2006	European Championships	Gothenburg, Sweden	4th	4 × 100 m relay	43.97
2007	Universiade	Bangkok, Thailand	6th	100 m	11.71
2007	Universiade	Bangkok, Thailand	3rd	4 × 100 m relay	43.99
2007	World Championships	Osaka, Japan	–	4 × 100 m relay	DNF
2008	Olympic Games	Beijing, China	–	4 × 100 m relay	DQ
