= Maria Aurora Salvagno =

Italian sprinter

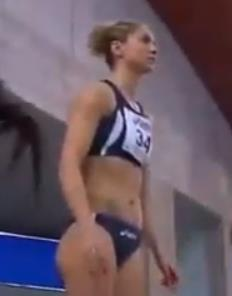
- Salvagno at the 2018 Italian Athletics Indoor Championships.

Personal information
- Nationality: Italian
- Born: March 3, 1986 (age 40) Alghero, Italy
- Height: 1.73 m (5 ft 8 in)
- Weight: 56 kg (123 lb)

Sport
- Country: Italy
- Sport: Athletics
- Event: Sprint
- Club: C.S. Aeronautica Militare

Achievements and titles
- Personal bests: 100 m: 11.50 (2009); 200 m: 24.13 (2008); 60 m indoor: 7.34 (2009)
Medal record
Summer Universiade
Gold medal – first place	2009 Belgrade	4x100 m relay
Mediterranean Games
Silver medal – second place	2009 Pescara	4x100 m relay
Military World Games
Gold medal – first place	2007 Hyderabad	4x100 m relay
European Team Championships
Silver medal – second place	2009 Leiria	100 m

Maria Aurora Salvagno (born 3 March 1986) is an Italian female sprinter. She was born in Alghero.

At senior level she has won one medal individually and three with the national relay team in international athletics competitions. She has gained ten caps for the national team from 2007 to 2011.

== International competitions ==
Year	Competition	Venue	Position	Event	Notes
Representing Italy
2002	Gymnasiade	Caen, France	2nd	200 m	12.18
2002	Gymnasiade	Caen, France	2nd	Medley relay	2:10.63
2005	European Junior Championships	Kaunas, Lithuania	7th	100 m	11.96
2007	European U23 Championships	Debrecen, Hungary	8th	100 m	11.89 (wind: -2.0 m/s)
2007	European U23 Championships	Debrecen, Hungary	4th	4x100 m relay	44.08
2007	Summer Universiade	Bangkok, Thailand	5th	4x100 m relay	44.71
2007	Summer Universiade	Bangkok, Thailand	7th	100 m	11.73
2007	Military World Games	Hyderabad, India	1st	4x100 m relay	44.97
2009	European Indoor Championships	Turin, Italy	8th	60 m	7.43
2009	Mediterranean Games	Pescara, Italy	2nd	4x100 m relay	43.86
2009	European Team Championships	Leiria, Portugal	2nd	100 m	11.51 PB
2009	Summer Universiade	Belgrade, Serbia	1st	4x100 m relay	43.83
2009	Summer Universiade	Belgrade, Serbia	4th	100 m	11.55

== National titles ==
Maria Aurora Salvagno has won one time the individual national championship.

- 1 win in the 60 metres indoor (2010)

== See also ==
- Italy national relay team
