= Yulia Nestsiarenka =

Belarusian sprinter

Yuliya Nesterenko
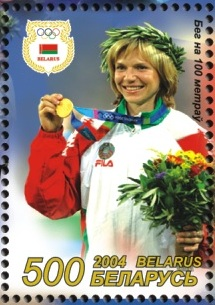
- Nestsiarenka on a 2004 Belarusian stamp

Personal information
- Born: 15 June 1979 (age 47) Brest, Byelorussian SSR, Soviet Union
- Height: 1.73 m (5 ft 8 in)
- Weight: 60 kg (132 lb)

Sport
- Country: Belarus
Medal record
Women's athletics
Representing Belarus
Olympic Games
Gold medal – first place	2004 Athens	100 m
World Championships
Bronze medal – third place	2005 Helsinki	4 × 100 m relay
World Indoor Championships
Bronze medal – third place	2004 Budapest	60 metres
European Championships
Bronze medal – third place	2006 Gothenburg	4 × 100 m relay

Yuliya Nesterenko (alt. spelling: Yulia Nestsiarenka, Belarusian: Юлія Несцярэнка, Julija Nieściarenka, Russian: Юлия Нестеренко, Yuliya Nesterenko; born 15 June 1979), née Bartsevich, is a Belarusian sprinter who was the Olympic 100 meters champion in 2004.

Nesterenko won the women's 100 metres at the 2004 Summer Olympics in Athens in 10.93 seconds, becoming the first non-black athlete to win the event since the 1980 Summer Olympics. She ran all four times (two qualification rounds, semifinal and final) under 11 seconds.

After the Olympic games in Athens she took an almost year-long break. At the 2005 World Championships in Athletics in Helsinki she reached the final in the 100 metres, though came only 8th (11.13 seconds). She won a bronze medal in another event, the 4 × 100 metres relay, together with her compatriots Natallia Solohub, Alena Neumiarzhitskaya and Aksana Drahun. At the 2006 European Athletics Championships in Gothenburg she was 6th in the 100 m final and won a bronze medal in the 4 × 100 m relay.

At the 2008 Summer Olympics in Beijing, Nesterenko competed in the 100 m again. In her first round heat she came 2nd behind Kim Gevaert in a time of 11.40 to advance to the second round. There she improved down to 11.14 seconds, but finished 4th, normally causing elimination, however hers was the fastest losing time and enough to qualify for the semifinals. She came close to reaching the final to defend her title with a time of 11.26, 5th place, while the first four athletes qualified for the final. Together with Aksana Drahun, Nastassia Shuliak and Anna Bagdanovich she took part in the 4 × 100 m relay. In their first round heat they placed 6th with a time of 43.69 seconds, which was the 9th overall out of 16 countries. With this result they failed to qualify for the final.

Nesterenko is a member of the Belarus Olympic Committee.
