= Emma Rienas =

Swedish sprinter

Personal information
- Born: 15 October 1982 (age 43) Storfors, Sweden
- Height: 1.68 m (5 ft 6 in)
- Weight: 54 kg (119 lb)

Sport
- Sport: Athletics
- Event: 100 metres
- Club: Filipstads IF (–2000); IF Göta (2001–2010)

Emma Karolin Rienas (born 15 October 1982) is a retired Swedish sprinter. She represented her country in the 4 × 100 meters relay at the 2005 World Championships. Additionally, she finished sixth in the same event at the 2010 European Championships.

== International competitions ==
Year	Competition	Venue	Position	Event	Notes
Representing Sweden
1999	European Youth Olympic Days	Esbjerg, Denmark	3rd	100 m	12.11
2000	World Junior Championships	Santiago, Chile	3rd	4 × 100 m relay	44.78
2005	World Championships	Helsinki, Finland	11th (h)	4 × 100 m relay	43.67
2006	European Championships	Gothenburg, Sweden	27th (h)	100 m	11.76
2006	European Championships	Gothenburg, Sweden	8th (h)	4 × 100 m relay	44.08
2009	European Indoor Championships	Turin, Italy	12th (sf)	60 m	7.40
2010	World Indoor Championships	Doha, Qatar	15th (sf)	60 m	7.38
2010	European Championships	Barcelona, Spain	6th	4 × 100 m relay	43.75

== Personal bests ==
Outdoor

- 100 metres – 11.54 (+1.8 m/s, Sundsvall 2009)
- 200 metres – 24.00 (0.0 m/s, Sollentuna 2006)

Indoor

- 60 metres – 7.32 (Turin 2009)
- 200 metres – 25.18 (Malmö 2005)
