= Lien Huyghebaert =

Belgian sprinter

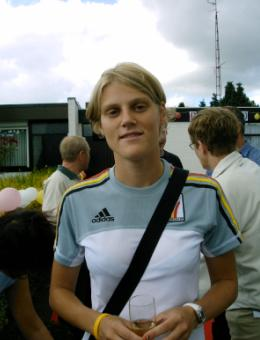
Lien Huyghebaert

Lien Huyghebaert (born 31 August 1982) is a Belgian sprinter, who specializes in the 100 metres.

Huyghebaert finished sixth in 4 x 100 metres relay at the 2004 Summer Olympics, with teammates Katleen De Caluwé, Élodie Ouédraogo and Kim Gevaert. This team set a national record of 43.08 seconds in the heat.

Her personal best time is 11.49 seconds, achieved in July 2004 in Brussels.
