= Nastassia Shuliak =

Belarusian sprinter

Nastassia Shuliak (Belarusian: Настасься Шуляк; born February 11, 1983) is a track and field sprint athlete who competes internationally for Belarus.

Shuliak represented Belarus at the 2008 Summer Olympics in Beijing. She competed at the 4 × 100 metres relay together with Yuliya Nestsiarenka, Aksana Drahun and Anna Bagdanovich. In their first round heat they placed sixth with a time of 43.69 seconds, which was the 9th time overall out of sixteen participating nations. With this result they failed to qualify for the final.

== Bibliography ==
- Nastassia Shuliak at World Athletics
