= Jessica Kilian =

Swiss skeleton racer

Jessica Kilian (born 8 December 1981 in Colombo, Sri Lanka) is a Swiss skeleton racer who has competed since 2002. Her best Skeleton World Cup finish was fourth at St. Moritz in January 2008.

Kilian's best finish at the FIBT World Championships was 16th in the women's event at Altenberg in 2008.
