= Fabienne Béret-Martinel =

French sprinter

Fabienne Beret-Martinel (born 22 December 1977), is a French athlete specialising in the sprints.

== Prize list ==
- Champion of France in 2006 for 200 m
- Champion of France in 2006 for indoor 60m: (7.30)
- 4th in championships of France in Rouen in the sotteville (11.34) in 2004
- 3rd in 400m relay at Athens Olympic Games in 2004 with the French relay Christine Arron, Murielle Hurtis, Veronique Mang, Sylviane Felix and Fabé Dia. They finished in 3rd place.
- Finalist and second leg runner of 4 × 100m at 2006 European Athletics Championships (Beside Véronique Mang, Adrianna Lamalle & Muriel Hurtis). The French team was forced to abandon the race in the last leg of the relay due to an injury of the third leg Adrianna Lamalle
- 2007 World Athletics Championships to Osaka (Japan)
  - eliminated in the semifinals of the relay 4 × 100 m
