= Georgia Kokloni =

Greek sprinter

Personal information
- Born: 7 May 1981 (age 45)

Sport
- Country: Greece
- Sport: Athletics
- Event(s): 60m, 100m

Achievements and titles
- Personal best(s): 7.14 sec, 11.24 sec
Medal record
European Indoor Championships
| Silver medal – second place | 2005 Madrid | 60 m |
| Bronze medal – third place | 2002 Vienna | 60 m |

Georgia (or Yeoryía) Koklóni (Greek: Γεωργία Κοκλώνη) (born 7 May 1981 in Athens) is a Greek sprinter who specializes in 60 metres and 100 metres.

Her first major competition was the 2001 IAAF World Indoor Championships, but she was eliminated in the semi-finals of the 60 m. She won the 60 m bronze at the 2002 European Athletics Indoor Championships, however, and went on to win a gold medal at the 2003 European Athletics U23 Championships, winning the 100 m in 11.33 seconds.

Her first global outdoor championships was the 2003 World Championships in Athletics, where she was part of the Greek 4 x 100 metres relay team. They finished third in their heat but were not fast enough to reach the final. She had the honour of representing Greece in her home town at the 2004 Athens Olympics, running as part of the women's 4x100 metre relay team. The team finished last in their heat.

She had greater success at 60 metres, in which her personal best is 7.14 seconds, performed at the 2005 European Indoor Championships, in Madrid. At this final she missed the gold by Kim Gevaert only for 0.02 seconds.

She represented Greece as a host athlete of the 2006 IAAF World Cup and finished sixth in the women's 100 m.

She won her first major gold medal at the 2009 Mediterranean Games, beating Myriam Soumaré in the women's 100 m final to take the gold.

Her personal best at 100 metres is 11.24 seconds, achieved in 2010 in Patras.

== Honours ==
| Year | Competition | Venue | Position | Event | Notes |
Representing Greece
| 2001 | European U23 Championships | Amsterdam, Netherlands | 7th | 100m | 11.89 (wind: -1.2 m/s) |
| 2001 | European U23 Championships | Amsterdam, Netherlands | 5th | 4 × 100 m relay | 45.11 |
| 2001 | World Championships | Edmonton, Canada | 6th | 4 × 100 m relay | 43.25 SB |
| 2002 | European Indoor Championships | Vienna, Germany | 3rd | 60 m | 7.22 |
| 2002 | European Championships | Munich, Germany | 9th (sf) | 100 m | 11.44 |
| 2002 | European Championships | Munich, Germany | 9th (sf) | 4 × 100 m relay | 44.04 SB |
| 2003 | European U23 Championships | Bydgoszcz, Poland | 1st | 100 m | 11.33 (wind: 1.3 m/s) |
| 2004 | World Indoor Championships | Budapest, Hungary | 16th (sf) | 60 m | 7.33 |
| 2004 | Olympic Games | Athens, Greece | 14th (sf) | 4 × 100 m relay | 44.45 SB |
| 2005 | European Indoor Championships | Madrid, Spain | 2nd | 60 m | 7.18 |
| 2006 | European Championships | Gothenburg, Sweden | 9th (sf) | 100 m | 11.29 |
| 2006 | World Cup | Athens, Greece | 6th | 100 m | 11.40 |
| 2009 | European Team Championships | Leiria, Portugal | 6th | 100 m | 11.58 |
| 2009 | Mediterranean Games | Pescara, Italy | 1st | 100 m | 11.41 |
| 2009 | Mediterranean Games | Pescara, Italy | 3rd | 4 × 100 m relay | 45.45 |
| 2010 | European Championships | Barcelona, Spain | 7th | 100 m | 11.36 |
| 2011 | European Indoor Championships | Paris, France | 9th (sf) | 60 m | 7.23 |
| 2014 | European Championships | Zurich, Switzerland | 9th (sf) | 4 × 100 m relay | 43.81 SB |
