= Athletics at the 2007 Summer Universiade =

- Athletics pictogram
- Dates: 9 – 14 August
- Host city: Bangkok, Thailand
- Venue: Thammasat Stadium
- Level: Senior
- Events: 46
- Participation: 1016 athletes from 107 nations

The athletics competition at the 2007 Summer Universiade was held in the Main Stadium at Thammasat University in Bangkok, Thailand, between 9 August and 14 August 2007.

== Medal summary ==
=== Men's events ===
| Event | Gold | | Silver | | Bronze | |
|---|---|---|---|---|---|---|
| 100 metres | Simeon Williamson (GBR) | 10.22 | Zhang Peimeng (CHN) | 10.30 | Neville Wright (CAN) | 10.37 |
| 200 metres | Amr Seoud (EGY) | 20.74 PB | Leigh Julius (RSA) | 20.96 | Tomoya Kamiyama (JPN) | 20.97 |
| 400 metres | Sean Wroe (AUS) | 45.49 | Piotr Klimczak (POL) | 46.06 SB | Dmitry Buryak (RUS) | 46.22 SB |
| 800 metres | Ehsan Mohajer Shojaei (IRI) | 1:46.04 | Fabiano Peçanha (BRA) | 1:46.11 | Livio Sciandra (ITA) | 1:46.19 |
| 1500 metres | Samir Khadar (ALG) | 3:39.62 | Álvaro Rodríguez (ESP) | 3:39.78 | Fabiano Peçanha (BRA) | 3:40.98 |
| 5000 metres | Halil Akkaş (TUR) | 14:08.47 | Yuki Matsuoka (JPN) | 14:09.33 | Simon Ayeko (UGA) | 14:10.13 |
| 10,000 metres | Mohamed Fadil (MAR) | 30:19.41 SB | Simon Ayeko (UGA) | 30:22.58 | Stephen Mokoka (RSA) | 30:31.78 |
| Half marathon | Mohamed Fadil (MAR) | 1:05:49 SB | Najim El Gady (MAR) | 1:06:04 | Takashi Toyoda (JPN) | 1:06:30 |
| 3000 metre steeplechase | Halil Akkaş (TUR) | 8:20.83 CR | Barnabas Kirui (KEN) | 8:22.67 | Ion Luchianov (MDA) | 8:23.83 |
| 110 metres hurdles | Sergey Demidyuk (UKR) | 13.33 PB | Ji Wei (CHN) | 13.57 | Anselmo Gomes da Silva (BRA) | 13.58 |
| 400 metres hurdles | Petrus Koekemoer (RSA) | 49.06 | Kurt Couto (MOZ) | 49.12 SB | Javier Culson (PUR) | 49.35 |
| 4 × 100 m relay | Thailand; Pirom Autas, Wachara Sondee, Sompote Suwannarangsri, Sittichai Suwonprateep | 39.15 | South Africa; Johannes Dreyer, Leigh Julius, Hendrik Kotze, Snyman Prinsloo; Petrus Koekemoer | 39.20 | China; Wang Xiaoxu, Zhang Peimeng, Du Bing, Yin Hualong | 39.30 |
| 4 × 400 m relay | Poland; Witold Bańka, Piotr Klimczak, Piotr Kędzia, Daniel Dąbrowski | 3:02.05 | Australia; Dylan Grant, Mark Ormrod, Joel Milburn, Sean Wroe | 3:02.76 | Russia; Maxim Alexandrenko, Valentin Kruglyakov, Vladimir Antmanis, Dmitry Buryak | 3:05.04 |
| 20 km walk | Chu Yafei (CHN) | 1:24:37 | Park Chil-Sung (KOR) | 1:24:42 | Koichiro Morioka (JPN) | 1:25:10 |
| High jump | Aleksandr Shustov (RUS) | 2.31 | Kyriacos Ioannou (CYP) | 2.26 | Oleksandr Nartov (UKR) | 2.26 |
| Pole vault | Alexander Straub (GER) | 5.60 | Leonid Kivalov (RUS) | 5.60 | Dmitry Starodubtsev (RUS) | 5.50 |
| Long jump | Robert Crowther (AUS) | 8.02 PB | Chao Chih-chien (TPE) | 7.95 PB | Roman Novotny (CZE) | 7.88 |
| Triple jump | Kim Deok-Hyeon (KOR) | 17.02 SB | Viktor Kuznyetsov (UKR) | 16.94 SB | Wu Bo (CHN) | 16.64 |
| Shot put | Maxim Sidorov (RUS) | 20.01 | Māris Urtāns (LAT) | 19.38 | Chang Ming-huang (TPE) | 19.36 |
| Discus throw | Gerhard Mayer (AUT) | 61.55 | Omar Ahmed El Ghazaly (EGY) | 60.89 | Märt Israel (EST) | 60.32 |
| Hammer throw | Aleksandr Vashchyla (BLR) | 76.94 | Aliaksandr Kazulka (BLR) | 74.52 | Igor Vinichenko (RUS) | 73.94 |
| Javelin throw | Vadims Vasiļevskis (LAT) | 83.92 SB | Igor Janik (POL) | 82.28 SB | Ainārs Kovals (LAT) | 82.23 |
| Decathlon | Jacob Minah (GER) | 8099 PB | Hans Van Alphen (BEL) | 8047 PB | Carlos Chinin (BRA) | 7920 |

=== Women's events ===
| Event | Gold | | Silver | | Bronze | |
|---|---|---|---|---|---|---|
| 100 metres | Johanna Manninen; Finland | 11.46 | Olena Chebanu; Ukraine | 11.56 | Audra Dagelytė; Lithuania | 11.65 |
| 200 metres | Iryna Shtangyeyeva; Ukraine | 22.95 | Kadi-Ann Thomas; Great Britain | 23.28 PB | Hanna Mariën; Belgium | 23.48 |
| 400 metres | Olga Tereshkova; Kazakhstan | 51.62 PB | Danijela Grgić; Croatia | 51.88 SB | Ksenia Zadorina; Russia | 51.89 |
| 800 metres | Yuliya Krevsun; Ukraine | 1:57.63 WL, PB | Ekaterina Kostetskaya; Russia | 1:59.52 | Charlotte Best; Great Britain | 2:01.50 PB |
| 1500 metres | Olesya Chumakova; Russia | 4:09.32 | Tatyana Holovchenko; Ukraine | 4:10.46 | Sylwia Ejdys; Poland | 4:11.51 |
| 5000 metres | Jessica Augusto; Portugal | 15:28.78 CR | Tatyana Holovchenko; Ukraine | 15:40.56 | Elizaveta Grechishnikova; Russia | 15:50.58 |
| 10,000 metres | Ksenia Agafonova; Russia | 32:20.94 | Ryoko Kizaki; Japan | 32:55.11 PB | Jo Pun-Hui; North Korea | 33:20.55 |
| Half marathon | Kim Kum-Ok; North Korea | 1:12:31 | Kei Terada; Japan | 1:12:37 | Jong Yong-Ok; North Korea | 1:13:56 |
| 3000 metre steeplechase | Dobrinka Shalamanova; Bulgaria | 9:45.04 | Valentyna Gorpynych; Ukraine | 9:45.55 | Türkan Erişmiş; Turkey | 9:46.12 PB |
| 100 metres hurdles | Yauheniya Valadzko; Belarus | 13.03 PB | Nevin Yanit; Turkey | 13.07 | Yevgeniya Snihur; Ukraine | 13.08 |
| 400 metres hurdles | Tatyana Azarova; Kazakhstan | 55.52 | Anastasiya Rabchenyuk; Ukraine | 55.98 | Jonna Tilgner; Germany | 56.27 SB |
| 4 × 100 m relay | Finland; Heidi Hannula, Sari Keskitalo, Ilona Ranta, Johanna Manninen | 43.48 | Thailand; Sangwan Jaksunin, Orranut Klomdee, Jutamass Tawoncharoen, Nongnuch Sanrat | 43.92 SB | Ukraine; Olena Chebanu, Halyna Tonkovyd, Iryna Shtangyeyeva, Iryna Shepetyuk | 43.99 |
| 4 × 400 m relay | Ukraine; Nataliya Pygyda, Antonina Yefremova, Olha Zavhorodnya, Oksana Shcherbak | 3:29.59 | Russia; Olga Shulikova, Elena Voinova, Anastasia Kochetove, Ksenia Zadorina | 3:30.49 | Great Britain; Kelly Massey, Laura Finucane, Kadi-Ann Thomas, Faye Harding | 3:33.70 |
| 20 km walk | Jiang Qiuyan; China | 1:35:22 | Lidia Mongelli; Italy | 1:37:23 | Sniazhana Yurchanka; Belarus | 1:37:26 |
| High jump | Marina Aitova; Kazakhstan | 1.92 | Ariane Friedrich; Germany; Anna Ustinova; Kazakhstan | 1.90 | | |
| Pole vault | Aleksandra Kiryashova; Russia | 4.40 | Kristina Gadschiew; Germany | 4.40 | Nicole Büchler; Switzerland | 4.35 PB |
| Long jump | Olga Rypakova; Kazakhstan | 6.85 SB | Yelena Sokolova; Russia | 6.61 | Styliani Pilatou; Greece | 6.52 |
| Triple jump | Olha Saladukha; Ukraine | 14.79 PB | Dana Velďáková; Slovakia | 14.41 PB | Yarianna Martínez; Cuba | 14.25 |
| Shot put | Irina Tarasova; Russia | 17.46 | Yuliya Leantsiuk; Belarus | 17.20 | Magdalena Sobieszek; Poland | 16.88 |
| Discus throw | Yarelis Barrios; Cuba | 61.36 | Dani Samuels; Australia | 60.47 SB | Dragana Tomašević; Serbia | 56.82 |
| Hammer throw | Darya Pchelnik; Belarus | 68.74 | Eileen O'Keeffe; Ireland | 68.46 | Lenka Ledvinová; Czech Republic | 66.41 |
| Javelin throw | Buoban Pamang; Thailand | 61.40 NR | Monica Stoian; Romania | 61.19 PB | Urszula Jasińska; Poland | 60.63 |
| Heptathlon | Viktorija Žemaitytė; Lithuania | 5971 | Sara Aerts; Belgium | 5904 | Hanna Melnychenko; Ukraine | 5852 |

== Medals table ==
| Rank | Nation | Gold | Silver | Bronze | Total |
|---|---|---|---|---|---|
| 1 | Russia | 6 | 4 | 7 | 17 |
| 2 | Ukraine | 5 | 6 | 4 | 15 |
| 3 | Kazakhstan | 4 | 1 | 0 | 5 |
| 4 | Belarus | 3 | 2 | 0 | 5 |
| 5 | Germany | 2 | 3 | 0 | 5 |
| 6 | China | 2 | 2 | 2 | 6 |
| 7 | Australia | 2 | 2 | 0 | 4 |
| 8 | Turkey | 2 | 1 | 1 | 4 |
| 9 | Morocco | 2 | 1 | 0 | 3 |
| 9 | Thailand | 2 | 1 | 0 | 3 |
| 11 | Finland | 2 | 0 | 0 | 2 |
| 12 | Poland | 1 | 2 | 3 | 6 |
| 13 | South Africa | 1 | 2 | 1 | 4 |
| 14 | Great Britain | 1 | 1 | 2 | 4 |
| 15 | Latvia | 1 | 1 | 1 | 3 |
| 16 | Egypt | 1 | 1 | 0 | 2 |
| 16 | South Korea | 1 | 1 | 0 | 2 |
| 18 | North Korea | 1 | 0 | 2 | 3 |
| 19 | Cuba | 1 | 0 | 1 | 2 |
| 19 | Lithuania | 1 | 0 | 1 | 2 |
| 21 | Algeria | 1 | 0 | 0 | 1 |
| 21 | Austria | 1 | 0 | 0 | 1 |
| 21 | Bulgaria | 1 | 0 | 0 | 1 |
| 21 | Iran | 1 | 0 | 0 | 1 |
| 21 | Portugal | 1 | 0 | 0 | 1 |
| 26 | Japan | 0 | 3 | 3 | 6 |
| 27 | Belgium | 0 | 2 | 1 | 3 |
| 28 | Brazil | 0 | 1 | 3 | 4 |
| 29 | Chinese Taipei | 0 | 1 | 1 | 2 |
| 29 | Italy | 0 | 1 | 1 | 2 |
| 29 | Uganda | 0 | 1 | 1 | 2 |
| 32 | Croatia | 0 | 1 | 0 | 1 |
| 32 | Cyprus | 0 | 1 | 0 | 1 |
| 32 | Ireland | 0 | 1 | 0 | 1 |
| 32 | Kenya | 0 | 1 | 0 | 1 |
| 32 | Mozambique | 0 | 1 | 0 | 1 |
| 32 | Romania | 0 | 1 | 0 | 1 |
| 32 | Slovakia | 0 | 1 | 0 | 1 |
| 32 | Spain | 0 | 1 | 0 | 1 |
| 40 | Czech Republic | 0 | 0 | 2 | 2 |
| 41 | Canada | 0 | 0 | 1 | 1 |
| 41 | Estonia | 0 | 0 | 1 | 1 |
| 41 | Greece | 0 | 0 | 1 | 1 |
| 41 | Moldova | 0 | 0 | 1 | 1 |
| 41 | Puerto Rico | 0 | 0 | 1 | 1 |
| 41 | Serbia | 0 | 0 | 1 | 1 |
| 41 | Switzerland | 0 | 0 | 1 | 1 |
| Totals (47 entries) | | 46 | 48 | 44 | 138 |

== Participating nations ==
- Albania (1)
- Algeria (10)
- Armenia (1)
- Australia (19)
- Austria (5)
- Azerbaijan (1)
- Bahrain (1)
- Bangladesh (2)
- Belarus (26)
- Belgium (5)
- Benin (1)
- Bhutan (5)
- Botswana (5)
- Brazil (11)
- Bulgaria (2)
- Burkina Faso (2)
- Canada (20)
- Chad (2)
- Chile (1)
- China (39)
- Chinese Taipei (12)
- Comoros (2)
- Costa Rica (1)
- Croatia (9)
- Cuba (5)
- Cyprus (7)
- Czech Republic (10)
- Democratic Republic of the Congo (1)
- Denmark (16)
- Ecuador (6)
- Egypt (4)
- Equatorial Guinea (1)
- Estonia (27)
- Fiji (2)
- Finland (16)
- France (15)
- Gabon (1)
- Ghana (13)
- Germany (20)
- Great Britain (20)
- Greece (20)
- Guatemala (2)
- Hong Kong (6)
- Hungary (14)
- India (5)
- Indonesia (2)
- Iraq (2)
- Iran (9)
- Ireland (10)
- Israel (7)
- Italy (28)
- Japan (29)
- Kazakhstan (17)
- Kenya (10)
- Laos (1)
- Latvia (13)
- Lebanon (8)
- Liberia (6)
- Lithuania (13)
- Luxembourg (1)
- Macau (3)
- Madagascar (2)
- Malaysia (16)
- Mali (2)
- Mexico (11)
- Moldova (5)
- Mongolia (1)
- Morocco (10)
- Mozambique (1)
- Namibia (10)
- Nepal (2)
- Netherlands Antilles (5)
- New Zealand (6)
- Nicaragua (1)
- North Korea (4)
- Oman (4)
- Pakistan (7)
- Paraguay (1)
- Peru (2)
- Poland (18)
- Portugal (10)
- Puerto Rico (4)
- Qatar (3)
- Republic of the Congo (1)
- Romania (12)
- Russia (70)
- San Marino (1)
- Senegal (6)
- Serbia (11)
- Singapore (9)
- Slovakia (7)
- Slovenia (10)
- South Africa (24)
- South Korea (13)
- Spain (18)
- Sri Lanka (14)
- Swaziland (2)
- Switzerland (10)
- Thailand (58)
- Togo (2)
- Turkey (11)
- Uganda (20)
- Ukraine (29)
- United States Virgin Islands (1)
- Vietnam (5)
- Zambia (3)
- Zimbabwe (1)

== See also ==
- 2007 in the sport of athletics
- FISU World University Games
- University and college sport
