= Élodie Ouédraogo =

Belgian sprinter

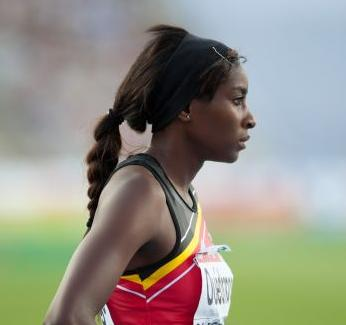

Personal information
- Born: 27 February 1981 (age 45) Saint-Josse-ten-Noode, Brussels, Belgium
- Height: 1.75 m (5 ft 9 in)
- Weight: 61 kg (134 lb)

Sport
- Event: 400 m Hurdles
Medal record
Olympic Games
Gold medal – first place	2008 Beijing	4 × 100 m relay
World Championships
Bronze medal – third place	2007 Osaka	4 × 100 m relay
Summer Universiade
Bronze medal – third place	2005 Izmir	200 m

Élodie Ouédraogo (born 27 February 1981 in Saint-Josse-ten-Noode) is a retired Belgian sprinter of Burkinabé descent, who specializes in the 200 metres and 400 m hurdles. An Olympic gold medalist, her personal best time in the 200 m is 23.11 seconds, achieved in July 2004 in Brussels, while her personal best in the 400 m hurdles is 55.20, achieved at the 2012 Summer Olympics. Ouédraogo is also the joint third-fastest Belgian woman after Kim Gevaert and Olivia Borlée and equalling Nancy Callaerts with her best 100 metres time of 11.40. Her 200 metres best ranks her fourth amongst Belgian women after Gevaert, Borlée and Hanna Mariën. Her 400 m hurdles best places her as the second-fastest Belgian woman over the distance, after Ann Mercken.

== Athletic career ==
In Ouédraogo's early career she concentrated on the 100 m hurdles, and participated in the 2000 World Junior Championships. She set a national record of 13.87 seconds for Burkina Faso, the country she represented until 2000. Her personal best time while competing for Belgium is 13.34 seconds, achieved in August 2003 in Jambes. Her Burkinabé national record was surpassed by Béatrice Kamboulé in 2007.

Ouédraogo finished sixth in the 4 × 100 metres relay at the 2004 Summer Olympics with teammates Katleen De Caluwé, Lien Huyghebaert and Kim Gevaert. Ouédraogo also won the bronze medal at the 2005 Summer Universiade. At the 2007 World Championships she won a bronze medal in the 4 × 100 m relay with teammates Olivia Borlée, Hanna Mariën and Kim Gevaert, setting another national record.

Ouédraogo represented Belgium at the 2008 Summer Olympics in Beijing. She competed at the 4 × 100 m relay together with Gevaert, Mariën and Borlée. In their first-round heat they placed first in front of Great Britain, Brazil and Nigeria. Their time of 42.92 seconds was the third time overall out of sixteen participating nations. In the finals they finished in second place behind Russia in a national record time of 42.54 seconds, though after re-testing samples in 2016, Yuliya Chermoshanskaya's tests revealed two illegal substances. The Russian team was disqualified for doping, and the Belgian's team silver medal was upgraded to a gold medal.

She qualified for the semi-finals of the 400 m hurdles at the 2012 Summer Olympics.

== Miscellaneous ==
Ouédraogo retired from athletics in 2012 with the Memorial Van Damme as her last event. She is married to cartoon artist Jeroom. She is the daughter of Marie Blandine Sawadogo.

In 2026, the Chemin Élodie Ouédraogo/Élodie Ouédraogoweg in the Heysel neighbourhood of Brussels, Belgium, was named in her honour.
