= Natalya Murinovich =

Russian sprinter

Natalya Murinovich (born 27 May 1985 in Shakhty) is a track and field sprint athlete who competes internationally for Russia.

Murinovich represented Russia at the 2008 Summer Olympics in Beijing. She competed at the 100 metres sprint and placed fifth in her first round heat, which normally meant elimination. However, her time of 11.55 was among the ten fastest losing times, resulting in a second round spot. There she failed to qualify for the semi-finals as her time of 11.51 was the seventh time of her race.
