= Natallia Solohub =

Belarusian sprinter

Medal record

Women's athletics

World Championships
| Bronze medal – third place | 2005 Helsinki | 4x100 m relay |

World Indoor Championships
| Silver medal – second place | 2004 Budapest | 4x400 m relay |
| Silver medal – second place | 2006 Moscow | 4x400 m relay |

Natallia Solohub, sometimes spelt Sologub (see Ge or He) (Belarusian: Наталля Салагуб; born March 31, 1975), is a Belarusian sprinter.

Solohub has won silver medals in 4 x 400 metres relay at the 2004 and 2006 World Indoor Championships, and a bronze medal in 4 × 100 m relay at the 2005 World Championships.

At the 2001 World Championships she failed a drugs test for norandrosterone. She was banned from the sport between August 2001 and August 2003.

== See also ==
- List of sportspeople sanctioned for doping offences

=== Personal bests ===
- 100 metres – 11.30 s (2005)
- 200 metres – 22.82 s (2005)
- 400 metres – 51.61 s (2001)
