= Audra Dagelytė =

Lithuanian sprinter (born 1981)

Audra Dagelytė (born 26 March 1981) was a Lithuanian sprinter, who mostly competed at 100 m and 200 m running events. She is also Akmenė district politician.

== Achievements ==
Year	Competition	Venue	Position	Event	Notes
2000	Lithuanian Athletics Championships	Kaunas, Lithuania	1st	100 m	11.64
2001	European U23 Championships	Amsterdam, Netherlands	12th (h)	100m	11.93 (wind: 0.2 m/s)
2001	Lithuanian Athletics Championships	Kaunas, Lithuania	1st	100 m	11.67
2002	Lithuanian Athletics Championships	Kaunas, Lithuania	2nd	100 m	11.87
2002	Lithuanian Athletics Championships	Kaunas, Lithuania	1st	200 m	24.30
2005	Lithuanian Athletics Championships	Kaunas, Lithuania	1st	100 m	11.68
2005	Lithuanian Athletics Championships	Kaunas, Lithuania	2nd	200 m	23.86
2006	Lithuanian Athletics Championships	Kaunas, Lithuania	2nd	100 m	11.85
2006	Lithuanian Athletics Championships	Kaunas, Lithuania	2nd	200 m	23.98
2006	European Championships in Athletics	Gothenburg, Sweden	26th (h)	100 m	11.74
2005	Lithuanian Athletics Championships	Kaunas, Lithuania	1st	100 m	11.50
2008	Lithuanian Athletics Championships	Kaunas, Lithuania	2nd	100 m	11.59
2008	Lithuanian Athletics Championships	Kaunas, Lithuania	1st	200 m	24.23

== Personal bests ==
Event	Result
60 m	7.39
100 m	11.38
200 m	24.29
