= Aksana Drahun =

Belarusian sprinter

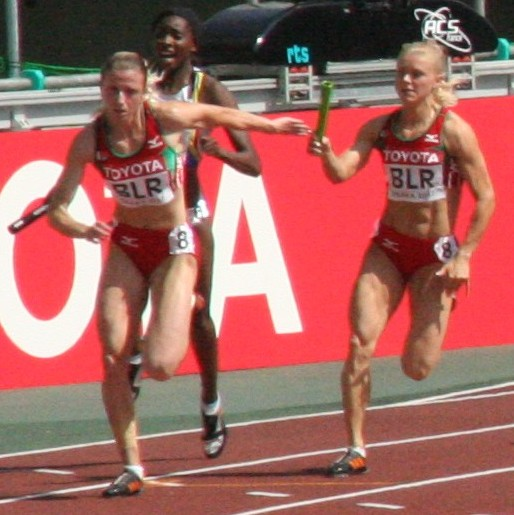
- Aksana Drahun (left) at the 2007 World Championships

Medal record

Representing Belarus

Women's athletics

World Championships
Bronze medal – third place	2005 Helsinki	4x100 m relay

Aksana Drahun (Belarusian: Аксана Драгун; born May 19, 1981), a.k.a. Oksana Dragun, is a Belarusian sprinter, who specializes in the 100 metres. Her personal best time is 11.28 seconds, achieved in July 2005 in Minsk.

Drahun won a bronze medal in 4 x 100 metres relay at the 2005 World Championships in Athletics together with Yulia Nestsiarenka, Natallia Solohub and Alena Neumiarzhitskaya. At the 2006 European Athletics Championships in Gothenburg she won a bronze medal in 4 × 100 m relay with Nestsiarenka, Natallia Safronnikava and Neumiarzhitskaya.

Drahun represented Belarus at the 2008 Summer Olympics in Beijing. She competed in the 4 × 100 m relay together with Nestsiarenka, Nastassia Shuliak and Anna Bagdanovich. In their first round heat they placed sixth with a time of 43.69 seconds, which was the 9th time overall out of sixteen participating nations. With this result they failed to qualify for the final.
