= Alena Newmyarzhytskaya =

Belarusian sprinter

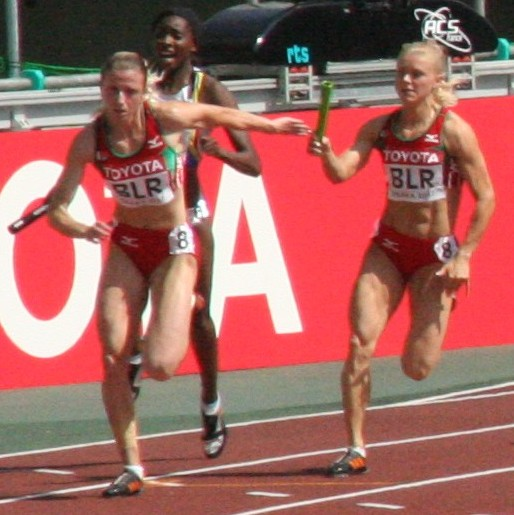
- Neumiarzhitskaya (right) at the 2007 World Championships

Medal record

Representing Belarus

Women's athletics

World Championships
| Bronze medal – third place | 2005 Helsinki | 4x100 m relay |

Alena Neumiarzhitskaya (Belarusian: Алена Неўмяржыцкая; born 27 July 1980) is a Belarusian sprinter.

Neumiarzhitskaya won a bronze medal in 4 x 100 metres relay at the 2005 World Championships in Athletics together with Yulia Nestsiarenka, Natallia Solohub and Aksana Drahun. At the 2006 European Athletics Championships in Gothenburg she won a bronze medal in 4 × 100 m relay with Nestsiarenka, Natallia Safronnikava and Drahun.

== Personal bests ==
- 100 metres – 11.05 s (2010)
- 200 metres – 22.99 s (2006)
