= Elena Chebanu =

Ukrainian-Azerbaijani Paralympic sprinter

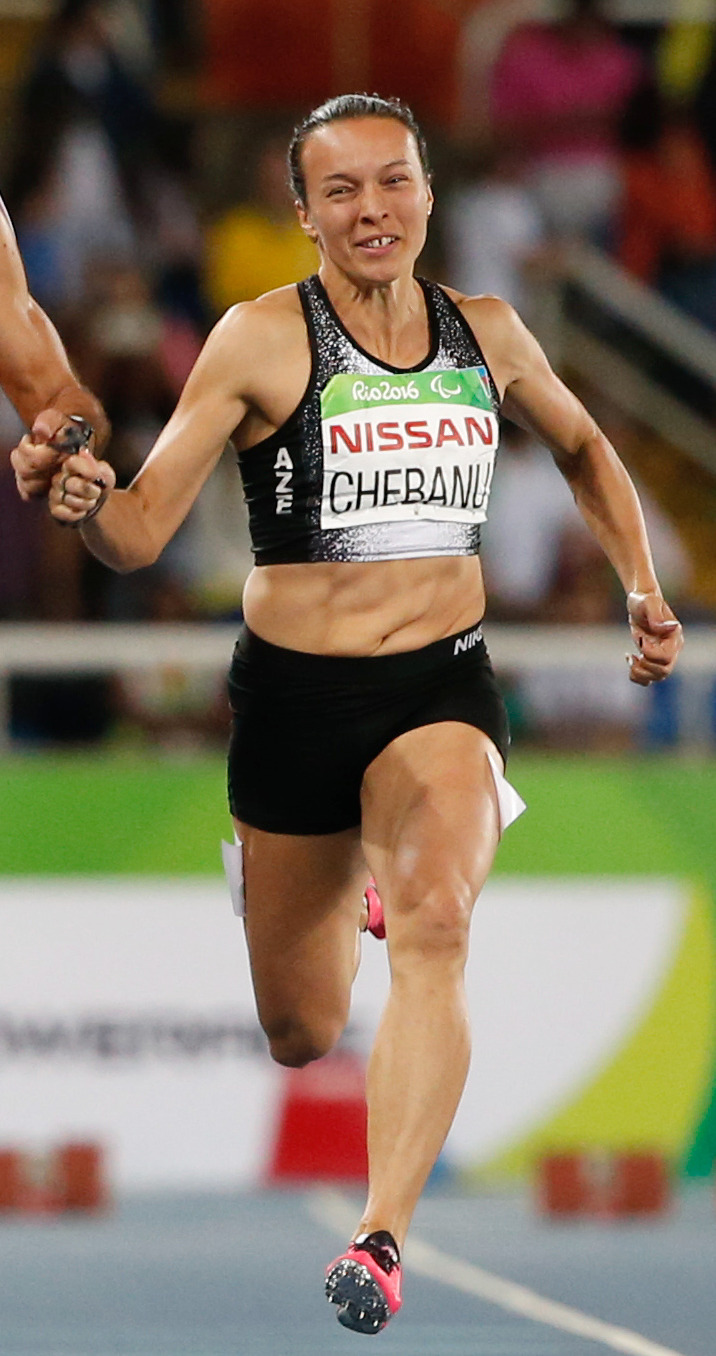
- Chebanu at the 2016 Paralympics

Personal information
- Nationality: Ukraine (until 2015); Azerbaijan (since 2015)
- Born: 4 January 1981 (age 45) Kharkiv, Ukraine

Sport
- Sport: Paralympic athletics
- Disability class: T12
- Event: Sprint
Medal record
Representing Ukraine
Summer Universiade
Silver medal – second place	2007 Bangkok	100 m
Bronze medal – third place	2007 Bangkok	4×100 m relay
Representing Azerbaijan
Paralympic Games
Silver medal – second place	2016 Rio	100 m – T12
Bronze medal – third place	2016 Rio	200 m – T12
IPC Athletics World Championships
Silver medal – second place	2015 Doha	100 m – T12
Bronze medal – third place	2015 Doha	200 m – T12

Elena Chebanu (Ukrainian: Олена Чебану; born 4 January 1981) is a Ukrainian-born Azerbaijani sprinter who specializes in the 100 and 200 metres. She was born in Ukraine and initially took part in regular sprint events, but since 2015, she has competed for Azerbaijan in the visually impaired category T12. She won the silver medal in the 100 m – T12 event at the 2016 Rio Paralympics.

In the 200 metres, she finished seventh at the 2006 European Championships and competed without reaching the final at the 2007 World Championships. In the 100 metres, she won the silver medal at the 2007 Summer Universiade. She also won a bronze medal in the 4 × 100 m relay here.

She also competed in the relay at the 2009 World Championships without reaching the final. At the 2007 World Championships, the Ukrainian team failed to finish the race. Her personal best times are 7.46 seconds in the 60 metres (indoor), achieved in January 2007 in Zaporizhzhya; 11.42 seconds in the 100 metres, achieved in June 2006 in Kyiv; and 22.97 seconds in the 200 metres, achieved in June 2006 in Málaga.
