= Emily Freeman =

British athlete (born 1980)

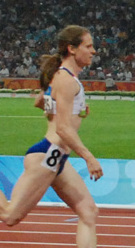
- Freeman at the 2008 Summer Olympics

Personal information
- Nationality: British (English)
- Born: 24 November 1980 (age 45) Huddersfield, England

Sport
- Sport: Athletics
- Event: Sprints

Emily Kaye Freeman (born 24 November 1980) is a retired British Olympic sprinter and advocate for gender equality in sports from Yorkshire, England. She is a co-founder of Totally Runable, an organisation that encourages girls and women to take up running.

Freeman competed both nationally and internationally between 2006 and her retirement from athletics in 2014. She represented England and Team GB in the Olympic Games, World Championships, Commonwealth Games and European Championships, specialising in 100m, 200m sprints and 4 × 100 m relay. Freeman worked for several years as a personal trainer with Pro Fit Personal Training at Total Fitness Gym in Wakefield. She co-founded Totally Runable after her retirement and now works full-time for that social enterprise company in and with schools, pupils, staff and parents, with the aim of inspiring and empowering others to be the people they dream of being.

== Early life and education ==
Freeman was born in Huddersfield, West Yorkshire, the daughter of Paul David Freeman, a GP and Susan Elizabeth Freeman, a nurse. She has 1 younger sister, Amy Jane Freeman-Hughes. Growing up in Mirfield, West Yorkshire, Freeman attended Primary School in Battyeford before Heckmondwike Grammar School, where she completed her GCSEs. From 1997 to 1999 she attended Greenhead College to take A-Levels in PE, Maths and Chemistry.

Freeman began her degree at the University of Birmingham in 1999, where she lived until 2001. Following the unexpected death of her father in 2000, she transferred to UCL to complete a master's degree in civil engineering (MEng). She graduated from UCL with a 2:1 in 2004.

== Athletics career ==
=== Childhood ===
Freeman began her athletics career aged 10 at Spenborough AC in Liversedge, West Yorkshire, England. She was taken to her local track by her grandparents after showing promise in races at school. She continued to train with Spenborough AC and later with Mike Williams at Beckett's Park Athletics Centre and Wakefield District Harriers & AC. She continues to hold Wakefield club records for all outdoor sprint distances.

=== English Schools Athletics Championships ===
Emily first competed at the English Schools Athletics Championships in Telford when she was aged 13. The following year she failed to qualify for the competition in Nottingham and watched from the stands. In 1996 she made a return, finishing 6th in the 200m. She went on to compete in the 200m in Sheffield in 1997 (finishing 2nd) and 1998 (finishing 5th) before moving to the 100m at Bury St Edmonds in 1999, to win the competition in a time of 12.34.

=== Junior career ===
Freeman's first domestic success came in 1997, aged 16, when she won the U17 200m at the AAA Junior Indoor Championships in a time of 24.19, a then all time UK record. She went on to win the 100m at the AAA U20 Championships in 1999 before competing at the 1999 European Athletics Junior Championships in Riga, Latvia.

=== Senior career ===
Moving up to Senior level, Freeman came 2nd in the 200m at the 2001 AAA Indoor Championships. 2002 then saw victory at the BUSA Athletics Championships in the 100m and 200m, along with 2nd place in the 60m at the BUSA Indoor Championships and 200m 3rd place at the AAA Championships. It also saw another 1st place in the AAA U23 Championships along with 3rd place in the English Commonwealth Games Trials 200m, followed by competing for England in the 200m in Manchester at the 2002 Commonwealth Games.

2003 and 2004 were frustrating for Freeman, with Achilles problems ruling her out of competing. These were managed in 2005 to allow her to compete, finishing 8th in the World University Games 100m in Izmir, Turkey and competing in the 4 × 100 m relay at the World Championships in Helsinki. 2006 saw a European Silver Medal in the 4 × 100 m relay, 200m 2nd place in the AAA Championships and 3rd place in the 60m at the AAA Indoor Championships.

In 2007 Freeman finished 2nd in the Norwich Union World Championship Trials 200m, qualifying to compete in the World Championships in 2007 in Osaka, Japan in the 200m. Disappointment followed however when a false start resulted in disqualification from her first individual 200m race in a World Championships. At the same competition she did however finish 4th as part of the 4 × 100 m relay team, narrowly missing out on a bronze medal by only 0.02 seconds.

The following year she won the 200m British Olympic Trials and competed at the 2008 Olympic Games in Beijing, finishing 7th in the 200m semi-final. She also competed as part of the 4 x 100 relay team, reaching the final with a qualifying time which would have earned an Olympic Bronze Medal had the team finished the race. In an event which saw 4 DNFs and 4 DQs over the heats and finals, Team GB failed to transfer the baton from the 2nd to the 3rd leg of the race, ending in a DNF, along with Jamaica, to add to Poland's disqualification from the final. In 2008 Freeman was ranked UK number 1 in the 200m, competing (in addition to the Olympics) in France, the Netherlands, Germany and Switzerland, as well as all over the UK.

2009 was even better for Freeman, competing in Germany, Portugal, France, Greece, Italy, Switzerland and all over the UK. She came 1st in the 200m GB Aviva World Championship Trials and went on to reach a World Final, finishing 7th in the 200m and running a PB in the semi-final, a time of 22.64. The same year she won Gold at the European Team Championships 100m in a time of 11.42, the first British woman to win the event. She was ranked UK number 1 in both 100m and 200m, having retained her 200m UK National title at the 2009 British Athletics Championships.

2010 was a frustrating year, with recurring Achilles issues limiting how well Freeman could capitalise on her successes of 2009. She continued to compete as much as possible, travelling to Spain, Norway and New York to do so, most notably finishing with a 5th place over 200m at the European Team Championships in Bergen and 5th place semi-final finish in the 200m at the European Championships in Barcelona.

Continuing Achilles problems ruled Freeman out of competition in 2011, 2012 and 2013, including what would have been a home Olympic Games in London in 2012.

Following recovery from injury Freeman switched to the 400m for the last season of her athletic career. She returned to fitness winning the 2014 Yorkshire Championships in a time of 55.31, retiring after that event, aged 33, to pursue a career outside athletics.

Throughout her career Freeman was coached by Brian Hall. Freeman received lottery funding from 2007 until December 2010 and was a full-time athlete until 2012.

=== Athlete Committees ===
Since 2010 Freeman has been an athlete representative on the UK Anti-Doping Athlete Committee, whose role on behalf of UKAD is to engage with athletes to ensure that their views are represented and to collect feedback on UKAD programmes.

Between November 2010 and November 2012 Freeman was an Athlete Committee Member for the British Olympic Association.

=== Since retirement ===
Since retirement Freeman has continued to run longer distances for fun. She regularly runs at Dewsbury, Nostell Priory, Concord, Wakefield Thornes and Rother Valley parkruns. In October 2015 she ran the Yorkshire Marathon, finishing in a time of 4 hours 22 minutes 58 seconds, to fundraise for Brainkind.

== Personal bests ==
Event	PB
60m	7.42i
100m	11.33
200m	22.64
300m	38.04
400m	53.31
5k	24.02
parkrun	22.18
10k	50.41
Marathon	4.22.58

== Personal life ==
In 2004 Freeman moved from London back to Yorkshire, living in Thorpe Hesley, Rotherham. She began working for JNP Group as Graduate Engineer in 2004, and worked there until October 2007. Whilst working for JNP Group she met her now husband Philip Cantrell, whom she married in December 2009.

== Business ==
Freeman qualified as a Personal Trainer in late 2012 and began working at Total Fitness in Wakefield with Pro Fit Personal Training the same year. She was a Pro Fit Level 5 Personal Trainer until January 2017.

Following retirement in 2014, Freeman co-founded Totally Runable, a coaching and mindset training company. Totally Runable began working with adult beginner and challenge runners, companies and charities. Since February 2016 Totally Runable has been working with schools and children, particularly girls, with the aim of improving confidence and self-esteem, both in and out of sport.
