= Laura Turner (sprinter) =

British sprinter (born 1982)

Personal information
- Nationality: British (English)
- Born: 12 August 1982 (age 43) London, England
- Height: 168 cm (5 ft 6 in)
- Weight: 57 kg (126 lb)

Sport
- Sport: athletics
- Club: Harrow AC

Achievements and titles
- Olympic finals: n/a
- Personal best(s): 60 m 7.25; 100 m 11.09; 200 m 23.29
Medal record
Representing England
Commonwealth Games
Gold medal – first place	2010 Delhi	4x100 m relay

Laura Kate Turner-Alleyne (born 12 August 1982) is a British former sprinter, who represented Great Britain at the 2008 Olympics in Beijing.

== Biography ==
Turner competed in four Athletics World Championships and took five British national championship titles across her career, in 60 m, 100 m and 200 m.

She was part of the British 4 × 100 m relay team that finished 4th at the 2007 World Championships in Athletics in Osaka (along with Montell Douglas, Joice Maduaka and Emily Freeman).

Turner represented Great Britain at the 2008 Summer Olympics in Beijing, competing at the 100 m sprint. In her first round heat she placed fourth in a time of 11.65, which was not enough to advance to the second round.

At the 2010 Commonwealth Games in Delhi, Turner, competing for England, was involved in the controversial false start incident as a result of which the race winner Sally Pearson was later disqualified. Both Turner and Pearson false-started, but initially only Turner was given the red card to exclude her from the race. Turner immediately protested at being singled out, and decided to run the race and appeal afterwards. She finished last, and her appeal was turned down. Pearson was subsequently disqualified and the gold medal was awarded to Nigeria's Oludamola Osayomi. However, she also won a gold medal in Delhi as part of the English team in the 4 × 100 m relay, alongside Douglas, Katherine Endacott and Abiodun Oyepitan. She finished her competitive career in 2013, becoming a coach.

Turner attended Brunel University London, where she graduated with a BSc in Sports Sciences and an MSc in High Performance Physiology.
