= Carima Louami =

French sprinter (born 1979)

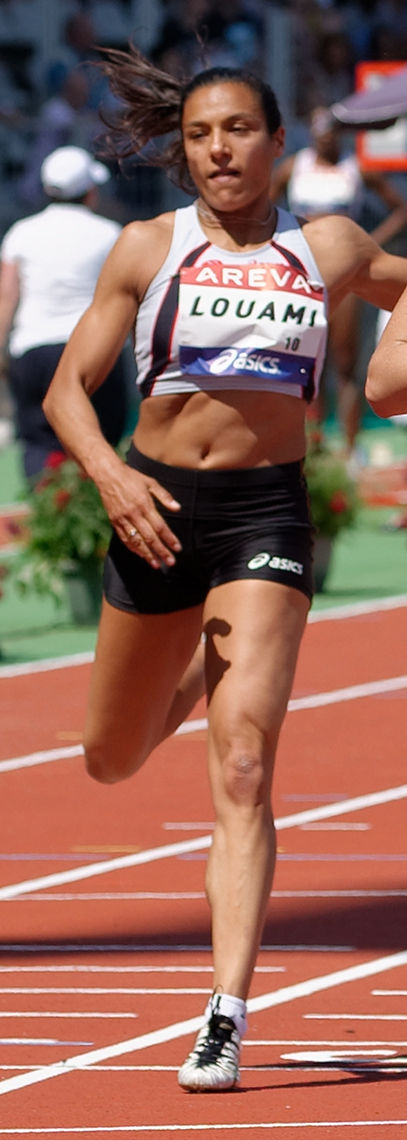
Carima Louami at the first series of the women's 200-metre race during the French Athletics Championships 2013 at Stade Charléty in Paris, 14 July 2013.

Carima Louami (born 12 May 1979 in Tourcoing) is a track and field sprint athlete who competes internationally for France.

Louami represented France at the 2008 Summer Olympics in Beijing. She competed at the 4 × 100 metres relay together with Muriel Hurtis-Houairi, Myriam Soumaré and Lina Jacques-Sébastien. In their first round heat they did not finish and were eliminated due to a mistake with the baton exchange.
