= 2005 World Championships in Athletics – Women's 100 metres =

These are the official results of the Women's 100 metres event at the 2005 IAAF World Championships in Helsinki, Finland. The final was held on August 8.

== Medalists ==
Gold	Lauryn Williams; United States (USA)
Silver	Veronica Campbell; Jamaica (JAM)
Bronze	Christine Arron; France (FRA)

== Records ==
World Record	Florence Griffith Joyner (USA)	10.49	Indianapolis, United States	16 July 1988
Championship Record	Marion Jones (USA)	10.70	Seville, Spain	22 August 1999

== Results ==
=== Heats ===
7 August 2005 (14:45)

Rank	Heat	Name	Result	Notes
1	2	Christine Arron (FRA)	11.15	Q
1	4	Chandra Sturrup (BAH)	11.15	Q
3	2	Yulia Nestsiarenka (BLR)	11.21	Q (SB)
4	6	Veronica Campbell-Brown (JAM)	11.30	Q
5	8	Me'Lisa Barber (USA)	11.32	Q
6	3	Sherone Simpson (JAM)	11.33	Q
7	5	Olga Fedorova (RUS)	11.36	Q
7	8	Kim Gevaert (BEL)	11.36	Q
9	5	Lauryn Williams (USA)	11.38	Q
10	2	Zhanna Block (UKR)	11.39	Q
11	1	Maria Karastamati (GRE)	11.40	Q
11	3	Muna Lee (USA)	11.40	Q
11	4	Lucimar Aparecida de Moura (BRA)	11.40	Q
11	6	Endurance Ojokolo (NGR)	11.40	Q
15	4	Mariya Bolikova (RUS)	11.41	Q
16	3	Manuela Levorato (ITA)	11.46	Q
17	6	Kelly-Ann Baptiste (TRI)	11.48	Q
18	1	Larisa Kruglova (RUS)	11.50	Q
18	5	Vida Anim (GHA)	11.50	Q
20	7	Aleen Bailey (JAM)	11.52	Q
21	5	Sylviane Félix (FRA)	11.54	q
22	2	Tahesia Harrigan (IVB)	11.55	q
22	4	Heidi Hannula (FIN)	11.55	q
24	1	Sylvie Mballa Éloundou (CMR)	11.59	Q
24	3	Delphine Atangana (CMR)	11.59	q
26	7	Geraldine Pillay (RSA)	11.60	Q
27	1	Mercy Nku (NGR)	11.61	q
27	8	Oluwatoyin Olupona (CAN)	11.61	Q
29	6	LaVerne Jones-Ferrette (ISV)	11.63	Q
30	7	Affoué Amandine Allou (CIV)	11.65	Q
31	4	Alenka Bikar (SLO)	11.68	q
32	7	Emma Ania (GBR)	11.69	q
33	8	Melisa Murillo (COL)	11.71	
34	5	Deysie Natalia Sumigar (INA)	11.88	
35	2	Yah Soucko Koïta (MLI)	12.06	
36	3	Gloria Diogo (STP)	12.09	
37	3	Basma Al-Eshosh (JOR)	12.37	(SB)
38	8	Tricia Flores (BIZ)	12.59	
39	1	Diane Borg (MLT)	12.61	
40	3	Ngerak Florencio (PLW)	12.64	(NR)
41	5	Desiree Craggette (GUM)	12.80	(NR)
42	7	Curlee Gumbs (AIA)	12.87	
43	7	Valentina Nazarova (TKM)	12.87	(SB)
44	8	Olga Gerasimova (TJK)	12.95	(PB)
45	7	Montserrat Pujol (AND)	13.01	
46	6	Im Wa Cheong (MAC)	13.04	(SB)
47	8	Rosa Mystique Jone (NRU)	13.16	
48	5	Marie-Victoire Mboh (CAF)	13.25	(PB)
49	2	Pauline Kwalea (SOL)	13.43	(PB)
50	1	Dolores Dogba (PYF)	13.44	
51	2	Tit Linda Sou (CAM)	13.45	(PB)
52	6	Evangeleen Ikelap (FSM)	13.51	(SB)
53	7	Christina Maltape (VAN)	13.65	(SB)
54	4	Kaitinano Mwemweata (KIR)	13.80	(SB)
55	4	Severina Chilala (ANG)	14.21	(PB)
-	1	Takilang Kabua (MHL)	DNS	
-	6	Shu-Chuan Chuang (TPE)	DNS	

=== Quarterfinals ===
7 August 2005 (18:40)

Rank	Heat	Name	Result	Notes
1	2	Christine Arron (FRA)	11.03	Q
2	3	Chandra Sturrup (BAH)	11.10	Q
3	4	Sherone Simpson (JAM)	11.12	Q
4	4	Me'Lisa Barber (USA)	11.15	Q
5	1	Veronica Campbell-Brown (JAM)	11.17	Q
6	2	Yulia Nestsiarenka (BLR)	11.18	Q (SB)
7	1	Lauryn Williams (USA)	11.22	Q
7	3	Muna Lee (USA)	11.22	Q
9	3	Kim Gevaert (BEL)	11.25	Q
10	2	Zhanna Block (UKR)	11.27	Q
10	3	Mariya Bolikova (RUS)	11.27	q
12	4	Lucimar Aparecida de Moura (BRA)	11.28	Q
13	2	Aleen Bailey (JAM)	11.29	q
13	3	Maria Karastamati (GRE)	11.29	q
15	4	Endurance Ojokolo (NGR)	11.33	q
16	1	Olga Fedorova (RUS)	11.37	Q
17	4	Vida Anim (GHA)	11.41	(SB)
18	4	Kelly-Ann Baptiste (TRI)	11.42	
19	2	Tahesia Harrigan (IVB)	11.47	
20	1	Geraldine Pillay (RSA)	11.48	
21	3	Sylviane Félix (FRA)	11.51	
21	4	LaVerne Jones-Ferrette (ISV)	11.51	
23	1	Heidi Hannula (FIN)	11.52	
23	4	Delphine Atangana (CMR)	11.52	
25	1	Manuela Levorato (ITA)	11.54	
26	1	Sylvie Mballa Éloundou (CMR)	11.55	
27	2	Larisa Kruglova (RUS)	11.56	
28	1	Mercy Nku (NGR)	11.57	
28	2	Affoué Amandine Allou (CIV)	11.57	
28	2	Emma Ania (GBR)	11.57	
28	3	Oluwatoyin Olupona (CAN)	11.57	
32	3	Alenka Bikar (SLO)	11.69	

=== Semifinals ===
8 August 2005 (18:50)

Rank	Heat	Name	Result	Notes
1	1	Christine Arron (FRA)	10.96	Q
2	1	Veronica Campbell (JAM)	11.00	Q
3	2	Lauryn Williams (USA)	11.03	Q
4	1	Me'Lisa Barber (USA)	11.08	Q
5	2	Chandra Sturrup (BAH)	11.09	Q
6	1	Muna Lee (USA)	11.10	Q (SB)
7	2	Yulia Nestsiarenka (BLR)	11.10	Q (SB)
8	2	Sherone Simpson (JAM)	11.15	Q
9	2	Zhanna Block (UKR)	11.18	(SB)
10	2	Maria Karastamati (GRE)	11.20	
11	1	Aleen Bailey (JAM)	11.23	
12	2	Lucimar de Moura (BRA)	11.27	
13	1	Olga Fedorova (RUS)	11.27	
14	1	Kim Gevaert (BEL)	11.30	
15	2	Mariya Bolikova (RUS)	11.31	
16	1	Endurance Ojokolo (NGR)	11.60	

=== Final ===
8 August 2005 (21:35)

Rank	Athlete	Time	Notes
Gold medal	Lauryn Williams (USA)	10.93	
Silver medal	Veronica Campbell (JAM)	10.95	SB
Bronze medal	Christine Arron (FRA)	10.98	
4	Chandra Sturrup (BAH)	11.09	
5	Me'Lisa Barber (USA)	11.09	
6	Sherone Simpson (JAM)	11.09	
7	Muna Lee (USA)	11.09	SB
8	Yulia Nestsiarenka (BLR)	11.13	
