= 2005 USA Outdoor Track and Field Championships =

- Dates: June 23–26
- Host city: Carson, California
- Venue: The Home Depot Center
- Level: Senior
- Type: Outdoor
- Events: 40 (men: 20; women: 20)

The 2005 USA Outdoor Track and Field Championships was organised by USA Track & Field and held from June 23 to 26 at The Home Depot Center in Carson, California. The four-day competition served as the national championships in track and field for the United States and also the trials for the 2005 World Championships in Athletics.

It was the first that the stadium in Carson had held the combined gender national track and field event, but the fourth straight time that the event was hosted in California, having previously been to Sacramento and Palo Alto. The Home Depot Center launched the Adidas Track Classic earlier that year, which was briefly a prominent annual track meeting for American athletes. The USA Junior Championships were held in conjunction with the event and the events served as selection for the 2005 Pan American Junior Athletics Championships.

Athletes that finished in the top three of their event and held the IAAF qualifying standard were eligible to represent the United States at the 2005 World Championships. The United States was able to send three athletes per event to the competition, excluding any American reigning world champions, who received automatic qualification separate from the national selection. The World Championships national selection for the marathon and 50 kilometres walk were incorporated into the discrete national championship meets for those events. Selection for the relay races were made by committee.

On the first day, 2004 Olympic champion Timothy Mack became a high profile omission from the national team and he finished outside of the top three of the men's pole vault. The men's 100 m provided drama with the initial disqualification of reigning Olympic champion Justin Gatlin for a false start being overturned. Gatlin won the title while fellow Olympic winner Maurice Greene pulled up injured mid-race. Gatlin also won the 200 m, being the first to do that double since Kirk Baptiste in 1985. Erin Gilreath won the women's hammer throw in an American record mark of 73.87 m (242 ft 4 1/4 in). Stacy Dragila won a seventh straight women's pole vault title (her ninth in total). Tim Broe had a third straight men's 5000 m win in a championship record time. Hammer thrower James Parker also won his third consecutive national title while javelin specialist Breaux Greer extended his unbeaten run to six.

A total of twelve athletes selected from the national championships went on to win individual gold medals at the World Championships that year. A total of 120 athletes were selected for the national team as a result of the national championships.

One athlete was disqualified for a doping infraction: Rickey Harris, a men's 400 m hurdles finalist, was later shown to have failed a drug test a month earlier at the same venue. Sprinters Marion Jones, Chryste Gaines and Tim Montgomery both attended but withdrew from the championships, citing injury. Montgomery and Gaines were banned from the sport later that year for doping as part of the BALCO scandal, which also implicated Jones.

The meet was marred before it began as official Paul Suzuki was killed, being struck in the head by a shot put during practice for the shot put competition. The resulting analysis of official's procedures and risk management greatly affected the conduct of throwing events since.

== Results ==
Key: ≠ Not selected for World Championships in Athletics due to failure to reach IAAF qualifying standard within the specified time limit.

=== Men track events ===
Event	Gold		Silver		Bronze	
100 metres	Justin Gatlin	10.08	Shawn Crawford	10.17	Leonard Scott	10.18
200 metres	Justin Gatlin	20.04	Tyson Gay	20.06	Shawn Crawford	20.12
400 metres	Jeremy Wariner	44.20	Darold Williamson	44.62	Andrew Rock	44.70
800 metres	Khadevis Robinson	1:45.27	David Krummenacker	1:46.80	Kevin Hicks	1:46.99
1500 metres	Alan Webb	3:41.97	Chris Lukezic	3:42.06	Rob Myers	3:42.27
5000 metres	Tim Broe	13:12.76 CR	Ian Dobson	13:15.33	Ryan Hall	13:16.03
10,000 metres	Abdihakem Abdirahman	28:10.38	Meb Keflezighi	28:10.57	Matthew Downin≠	28:34.65
110 m hurdles	Allen Johnson	12.99	Dominique Arnold	13.01	Terrence Trammell	13.02
400 m hurdles	Kerron Clement	47.24	Bershawn Jackson	47.80	James Carter	48.03
3000 m s'chase	Daniel Lincoln	8:17.27	Anthony Famiglietti	8:20.49	Steve Slattery	8:25.52
20,000 m walk	Tim Seaman	1:26:41.36	John Nunn	1:27:15.75	Benjamin Shorey≠	1:32:28.03

=== Men field events ===
Event	Gold		Silver		Bronze	
High jump	Matt Hemingway	2.27 m	Jesse Williams	2.27 m	Keith Moffatt≠	2.27 m
Pole vault	Brad Walker	5.75 m	Nick Hysong	5.65 m	Toby Stevenson	5.65 m
Long jump	Miguel Pate	8.35 m	Dwight Phillips	8.28 m	Brian Johnson	8.09 m
Triple jump	Walter Davis	17.15 m	Kenta Bell	16.82 m	Aarik Wilson	16.73 m
Shot put	Christian Cantwell	21.64 m	Adam Nelson	21.52 m	John Godina	20.99 m
Discus throw	Ian Waltz	64.54 m	Jarred Rome	62.50 m	Carl Brown	61.77 m
Hammer throw	James Parker	74.15 m	Jake Freeman≠	72.60 m	A. G. Kruger	71.48 m
Javelin throw	Breaux Greer	79.19 m	John Hetzendorf≠	78.23 m	Rob Minnitti≠	74.99 m
Decathlon	Bryan Clay	8506 pts	Paul Terek	7976 pts	Phillip McMullen	7795 pts

=== Women track events ===
Event	Gold		Silver		Bronze	
100 metres	Me'Lisa Barber	11.10	Muna Lee	11.28	Lauryn Williams	11.29
200 metres	Allyson Felix	22.13	Rachelle Smith	22.22	LaTasha Colander	22.34
400 metres	Sanya Richards	49.28	DeeDee Trotter	49.88	Monique Henderson	49.96
800 metres	Hazel Clark	1:59.74	Kameisha Bennett	2:00.59	Alice Schmidt	2:02.09
1500 metres	Treniere Clement	4:06.73	Jen Toomey≠	4:07.39	Amy Mortimer≠	4:07.58
5000 metres	Shalane Flanagan	15:10.96	Lauren Fleshman	15:16.80	Amy Rudolph	15:18.92
10,000 metres	Katie McGregor	31:33.82	Blake Russell	31:35.25	Jennifer Rhines	31:37.20
100 m hurdles	Michelle Perry	12.66	Joanna Hayes	12.77	Virginia Powell	12.87
400 m hurdles	Lashinda Demus	53.35	Shauna Smith	54.21	Sandra Glover	54.62
3000 m s'chase	Elizabeth Jackson	9:39.78	Lisa Galaviz	9:40.58	Carrie Messner	9:41.37
20,000 m walk	Teresa Vaill	1:33:28.15 CR	Amber Antonia≠	1:36:03.23	Joanne Dow	1:37:14.81

=== Women field events ===
Event	Gold		Silver		Bronze	
High jump	Amy Acuff	1.90 m	Chaunté Howard	1.90 m	Sharon Day≠	1.90 m
Pole vault	Stacy Dragila	4.45 m	Tracy O'Hara	4.40 m	Jillian Schwartz	4.40 m
Long jump	Grace Upshaw	6.70 m	Tianna Madison	6.70 m	Brianna Glenn≠	6.68 m
Triple jump	Erica McLain	14.01 m	Candice Baucham≠	14.00 m	Nicole Whitman≠	13.78 m
Shot put	Kristin Heaston	18.68 m	Michelle Carter≠	18.26 m	Elizabeth Wanless	18.14 m
Discus throw	Becky Breisch	62.92 m	Seilala Sua	61.82 m	Aretha Thurmond	61.77 m
Hammer throw	Erin Gilreath	73.87 m NR	Bethany Hart	69.15 m	Amber Campbell	68.95 m
Javelin throw	Kim Kreiner	58.95 m	Dana Pounds≠	54.05 m	Sarah Malone≠	53.71 m
Heptathlon	Hyleas Fountain	6208 pts	Virginia Miller	6192 pts	Fiona Asigbee≠	5994 pts

== World Championships qualification ==
=== Automatic byes ===
A total of five American athletes were eligible for automatic byes into the 2005 World Championships in Athletics as a result of their being the defending champions from the 2003 World Championships in Athletics. Torri Edwards, the reigning women's 100 meters world champion was ineligible due to doping ban.

- John Capel: men's 200 meters
- Tyree Washington: men's 400 meters (did not take up bye)
- Allen Johnson: men's 110 m hurdles
- Dwight Phillips: men's long jump
- Tom Pappas: men's decathlon (did not take up bye)

=== Non-top three selections ===
One month after the national championships, the men's 200 m third placer Shawn Crawford opted to withdraw from that World Championship event due a foot injury and to focus on the 100 m instead, allowing the national fourth place athlete Wallace Spearmon to take the third individual 200 m spot. Men's 20 km walk third place athlete Benjamin Shorey did not have the qualifying standard and Kevin Eastler (fourth in Carson) took his place as he has the standard. The third men's high jump spot went to fourth place Kyle Lancaster as Keith Moffatt did not have the "A" standard.

Joel Brown, fourth in the men's 110 m hurdles, was selected as the trials winner Allen Johnson had a bye as defending champion. Walter Davis gained similarly from the bye of men's long jump champion Dwight Phillips.

Erin Aldrich won the third women's high jump spot as third place Sharon Day failed to meet the "A" standard. Rose Richmond, fourth behind Brianna Glenn, took the women's long jump spot in the same circumstance.
