= 2006 IAAF World Indoor Championships – Women's 60 metres =

The Women's 60 metres event at the 2006 IAAF World Indoor Championships was held on 10 March 2006.

For the first time in the women's 60 metres at these championships, the gold and silver medallists achieved the same time. As of July 2024, this is the only time this has happened at these championships.

== Medalists ==
Gold	Silver	Bronze
Me'Lisa Barber; United States	Lauryn Williams; United States	Kim Gevaert; Belgium

== Results ==
=== Heats ===
First 4 of each heat (Q) and next 4 fastest (q) qualified for the semifinals.

Rank	Heat	Name	Nationality	Time	Notes
1	2	Christine Arron	France	7.16	Q
2	1	Kim Gevaert	Belgium	7.17	Q
3	5	Me'Lisa Barber	United States	7.18	Q
4	5	Sylvie Mballa Éloundou	Cameroon	7.22	Q
5	5	LaVerne Jones-Ferrette	United States Virgin Islands	7.22	Q, NR
6	3	Alena Neumiarzhitskaya	Belarus	7.23	Q, SB
7	3	Heidi Hannula	Finland	7.24	Q, PB
DQ	2	Zhanna Block	Ukraine	~~7.26~~	Q, Doping
8	3	Mariya Bolikova	Russia	7.26	Q
9	4	Lauryn Williams	United States	7.28	Q
10	1	Larisa Kruglova	Russia	7.31	Q
11	1	Angela Moroșanu	Romania	7.36	Q
11	2	Joice Maduaka	Great Britain	7.36	Q
13	3	Endurance Ojokolo	Nigeria	7.36	Q, SB
14	4	Guzel Khubbieva	Uzbekistan	7.38	Q
14	5	Emily Maher	Ireland	7.38	Q
16	1	Tezzhan Naimova	Bulgaria	7.39	Q
17	2	Affoué Amandine Allou	Ivory Coast	7.42	Q
18	4	Fabienne Beret-Martinel	France	7.43	Q
19	3	Ailis McSweeney	Ireland	7.44	q
20	3	Lina Grinčikaitė	Lithuania	7.46	q
21	1	Aksel Gürcan	Turkey	7.63	q, SB
22	5	Lucimar de Moura	Brazil	7.65	q
23	2	Lin Wen-Wen	Chinese Taipei	7.78	PB
23	5	Valentina Nazarova	Turkmenistan	7.78	PB
25	5	Auxiliadora Bonilla Lacayo	Nicaragua	7.79	PB
26	1	Qin Wangping	China	7.81	SB
27	2	Aleksandra Vojneska	Macedonia	7.88	
28	2	Charlene Attard	Malta	7.89	PB
29	4	Loi Ieong	Macau	7.94	Q, NR
30	1	Desiree Craggette	Guam	8.23	
31	4	Montserrat Pujol	Andorra	8.30	
32	3	Gharid Ghrouf	Palestine	8.42	NR
	4	Delphine Atangana	Cameroon	DNS	
	4	Fana Ashby	Trinidad and Tobago	DNS	

=== Semifinals ===
Rank	Heat	Name	Nationality	Time	Notes
1	1	Lauryn Williams	United States	7.10	Q, PB
2	2	Christine Arron	France	7.11	Q
3	3	Me'Lisa Barber	United States	7.12	Q
4	1	Kim Gevaert	Belgium	7.13	Q, SB
5	2	Mariya Bolikova	Russia	7.16	Q
DQ	1	Zhanna Block	Ukraine	~~7.19~~	q, ~~SB~~, Doping
6	3	Larisa Kruglova	Russia	7.21	Q
7	2	Sylvie Mballa Éloundou	Cameroon	7.23	q
7	3	Alena Neumiarzhitskaya	Belarus	7.23	SB
9	2	Heidi Hannula	Finland	7.26	
10	1	LaVerne Jones-Ferrette	United States Virgin Islands	7.27	
11	2	Angela Moroșanu	Romania	7.33	
11	3	Guzel Khubbieva	Uzbekistan	7.33	
13	2	Tezzhan Naimova	Bulgaria	7.36	
14	1	Emily Maher	Ireland	7.37	
14	2	Affoué Amandine Allou	Ivory Coast	7.37	
14	3	Fabienne Beret-Martinel	France	7.37	
17	3	Lina Grinčikaitė	Lithuania	7.38	
18	1	Joice Maduaka	Great Britain	7.41	
19	3	Ailis McSweeney	Ireland	7.42	
20	3	Endurance Ojokolo	Nigeria	7.53	
21	2	Lucimar de Moura	Brazil	7.72	
22	1	Aksel Gürcan	Turkey	7.78	
23	1	Loi Ieong	Macau	7.88	NR

=== Final ===
Rank	Lane	Name	Nationality	Time	React	Notes
1st place, gold medalist(s)	3	Me'Lisa Barber	United States	7.01	0.158	WL
2nd place, silver medalist(s)	6	Lauryn Williams	United States	7.01	0.145	WL
3rd place, bronze medalist(s)	5	Kim Gevaert	Belgium	7.11	0.150	NR
4	4	Christine Arron	France	7.13	0.147	
5	7	Mariya Bolikova	Russia	7.17	0.161	
DQ	1	Zhanna Block	Ukraine	~~7.19~~	0.216	Doping
6	2	Larisa Kruglova	Russia	7.23	0.143	
7	8	Sylvie Mballa Éloundou	Cameroon	7.30	0.127	
