= 2003 IAAF World Indoor Championships – Women's 60 metres =

The women's 60 metres event at the 2003 IAAF World Indoor Championships was held on March 14.

Zhanna Block originally won the gold medal, but she was disqualified in 2011 after her results from 30 November 2002 and onward were deleted as part of a sanction in connection with the BALCO scandal. Angela Williams was instead promoted to 2003 World champion.

== Medalists ==
Gold	Silver	Bronze
Angela Williams; United States	Torri Edwards; United States	Merlene Ottey; Slovenia

== Results ==
=== Heats ===
First 4 of each heat (Q) and next 4 fastest (q) qualified for the semifinals.

Rank	Heat	Name	Nationality	Time	Notes
DQ	5	Zhanna Block	Ukraine	7.16	Q, Doping
1	2	Angela Williams	United States	7.19	Q
2	1	Merlene Ottey	Slovenia	7.21	Q
3	3	Torri Edwards	United States	7.21	Q
3	5	Sylviane Félix	France	7.21	Q, SB
5	2	Marina Kislova	Russia	7.24	Q
6	1	Karin Mayr-Krifka	Austria	7.25	Q
6	5	Johanna Manninen	Finland	7.25	Q
8	1	Agné Eggerth	Lithuania	7.26	Q
8	2	Virgen Benavides	Cuba	7.26	Q
8	3	Chandra Sturrup	Bahamas	7.26	Q
11	1	Natasha Mayers	Saint Vincent and the Grenadines	7.27	Q
12	3	Iryna Kozhemyakina	Ukraine	7.29	Q
13	3	Mariya Bolikova	Russia	7.30	Q
13	5	Liliana Allen	Mexico	7.30	Q
15	4	Joice Maduaka	Great Britain	7.32	Q
16	2	Bettina Müller-Weissina	Austria	7.34	Q
16	4	Petya Pendareva	Bulgaria	7.34	Q
16	4	Philomena Mensah	Canada	7.34	Q
16	4	Savatheda Fynes	Bahamas	7.34	Q
20	2	Heather Samuel	Antigua and Barbuda	7.36	q, PB
21	1	Mercy Nku	Nigeria	7.39	q
21	5	Makaridja Sanganoko	Ivory Coast	7.39	q, PB
23	1	Erica Marchetti	Italy	7.41	q
23	5	Qin Wangping	China	7.41	
25	3	Yeoryia Kokloni	Greece	7.42	
26	3	Kadiatou Camara	Mali	7.42	
27	4	Fana Ashby	Trinidad and Tobago	7.43	
28	5	Susan Deacon	Great Britain	7.45	
29	2	Radmila Vukmirović	Slovenia	7.49	
30	4	Lyubov Perepelova	Uzbekistan	7.66	
31	1	Silvienne Krosendijk	Aruba	8.32	
	3	Patricia Riesco	Peru	DNS	
	4	Melocia Clarke	Jamaica	DNS	

=== Semifinals ===
First 2 of each semifinal (Q) and next 2 fastest (q) qualified for the final.

Rank	Heat	Name	Nationality	Time	Notes
DQ	2	Zhanna Block	Ukraine	7.08	Q, ~~WL~~, Doping
1	1	Merlene Ottey	Slovenia	7.17	Q, =NR
2	3	Karin Mayr-Krifka	Austria	7.18	Q
3	3	Savatheda Fynes	Bahamas	7.19	Q
4	3	Angela Williams	United States	7.19	q
5	3	Joice Maduaka	Great Britain	7.19	q, PB
6	1	Torri Edwards	United States	7.20	Q, PB
6	2	Marina Kislova	Russia	7.20	Q
8	1	Natasha Mayers	Saint Vincent and the Grenadines	7.23	
9	1	Chandra Sturrup	Bahamas	7.24	
9	2	Sylviane Félix	France	7.24	
11	2	Liliana Allen	Mexico	7.25	
12	3	Johanna Manninen	Finland	7.26	
13	2	Virgen Benavides	Cuba	7.28	
14	1	Heather Samuel	Antigua and Barbuda	7.30	NR
15	2	Agné Eggerth	Lithuania	7.31	
16	3	Iryna Kozhemyakina	Ukraine	7.32	
17	3	Mariya Bolikova	Russia	7.36	
18	1	Mercy Nku	Nigeria	7.37	
19	1	Philomena Mensah	Canada	7.39	
20	2	Bettina Müller-Weissina	Austria	7.40	
21	2	Erica Marchetti	Italy	7.41	
22	1	Petya Pendareva	Bulgaria	7.46	
22	3	Makaridja Sanganoko	Ivory Coast	7.46	

=== Final ===
Rank	Lane	Name	Nationality	Time	React	Notes
DQ	3	Zhanna Block	Ukraine	~~7.04~~	0.148	~~WL~~, ~~NR~~, Doping
1st place, gold medalist(s)	2	Angela Williams	United States	7.16	0.198	SB
2nd place, silver medalist(s)	7	Torri Edwards	United States	7.17	0.146	PB
3rd place, bronze medalist(s)	5	Merlene Ottey	Slovenia	7.20	0.148	
4	6	Karin Mayr-Krifka	Austria	7.23	0.141	
5	8	Marina Kislova	Russia	7.26	0.123	
6	1	Joice Maduaka	Great Britain	7.34	0.193	
	4	Savatheda Fynes	Bahamas	DNS		
