= Athletics at the 2004 Summer Olympics – Women's 4 × 100 metres relay =

Women's 4 × 100 metres relay at the Games of the XXVIII Olympiad
- Olympic Athletics
- Venue: Athens Olympic Stadium
- Dates: 26 August 2004 (round 1); 27 August 2004 (final)
- Competitors: 65 from 16 nations
- Winning time: 41.73 NR

Medalists
1st place, gold medalist(s)		Tayna Lawrence, Sherone Simpson, Aleen Bailey, Veronica Campbell, Beverly McDonald*	Jamaica
2nd place, silver medalist(s)		Olga Fyodorova, Yuliya Tabakova, Irina Khabarova, Larisa Kruglova	Russia
3rd place, bronze medalist(s)		Véronique Mang, Muriel Hurtis, Sylviane Félix, Christine Arron; *Indicates the athlete only competed in the preliminary heats.	France

The women's 4 × 100 metres relay at the 2004 Summer Olympics as part of the athletics program was held at the Athens Olympic Stadium from August 26 to 27. The sixteen teams competed in a two-heat qualifying round in which the first three teams from each heat, together with the next two fastest teams, were given a place in the final race.

The final started off quickly with an early lead from Jamaica, before the U.S. team, led by Angela Williams, made a tactical move to pass their Jamaican rivals towards the exchange zone. Marion Jones ran the second leg confidently to put the Americans a more decent lead, until she finally approached the 100 metres silver medalist Lauryn Williams to do the handoff. By the time Williams was about to move off her mark on the third leg, Jones lunged out of breath with baton and desperately tried to catch her at the exchange zone that never happened, costing the Americans' chances for the Olympic medal. As the race continued without the U.S. team, the Jamaicans, anchored by 200 metres champion Veronica Campbell, scorched their way down the home stretch to an effortless victory in 41.73 seconds. They were soon followed by Russia taking the silver, and the French quartet rounding out the medal podium with the bronze.

== Records ==
Prior to the competition, the existing World and Olympic records were as follows:

World record	East Germany (GDR); Silke Gladisch; Sabine Rieger; Ingrid Auerswald; Marlies Göhr	41.37	Canberra, Australia	6 October 1985
Olympic record	East Germany; Romy Müller; Bärbel Wöckel; Ingrid Auerswald; Marlies Göhr	41.60	Moscow, Soviet Union	1 August 1980

No new records were set during the competition.

== Qualification ==
The qualification period for athletics was 1 January 2003 to 9 August 2004. A National Olympic Committee (NOC) could enter one qualified relay team per relay event, with a maximum of six athletes. For this event, an NOC would be invited to participate with a relay team if the average of the team's two best times, obtained in IAAF-sanctioned meetings or tournaments, would be among the best sixteen, at the end of this period.

== Schedule ==
All times are Greece Standard Time (UTC+2)

Date	Time	Round
Thursday, 26 August 2004	22:00	Round 1
Friday, 27 August 2004	22:45	Final

== Results ==
=== Round 1 ===
Qualification rule: The first three teams in each heat (Q) plus the next two fastest overall (q) moved on to the final.

==== Heat 1 ====
Rank	Lane	Nation	Competitors	Time	Notes
1	1	United States	LaTasha Colander, Lauryn Williams, Marion Jones, Angela Williams	41.67	Q, =SB
2	6	Bahamas	Debbie Ferguson, Shandria Brown, Chandra Sturrup, Tamicka Clarke	43.02	Q, SB
3	4	Belgium	Kim Gevaert, Élodie Ouédraogo, Lien Huyghebaert, Katleen De Caluwé	43.08	Q, NR
4	3	Brazil	Luciana dos Santos, Rosemar Coelho Neto, Lucimar de Moura, Kátia Regina Santos	43.12	
5	2	Colombia	Norma González, Digna Luz Murillo, Felipa Palacios, Melisa Murillo	43.30	
6	8	Germany	Katja Wakan, Birgit Rockmeier, Marion Wagner, Sina Schielke	43.64	SB
7	5	Ukraine	Zhanna Block, Tetyana Tkalich, Maryna Maydanova, Iryna Kozhemyakina	43.77	
8	7	Greece	Maria Karastamati, Marina Vasarmidou, Effrosíni Patsoú, Georgia Kokloni	44.45	SB

==== Heat 2 ====
Rank	Lane	Nation	Competitors	Time	Notes
1	4	Russia	Larisa Kruglova, Irina Khabarova, Yuliya Tabakova, Olga Fyodorova	42.12	Q, SB
2	1	Jamaica	Aleen Bailey, Beverly McDonald, Sherone Simpson, Tayna Lawrence	42.20	Q, SB
3	8	France	Christine Arron, Sylviane Félix, Muriel Hurtis, Véronique Mang	42.98	Q
4	2	Nigeria	Endurance Ojokolo, Oludamola Osayomi, Mercy Nku, Gloria Kemasuode	43.00	q, SB
5	5	Belarus	Aksana Drahun, Alena Neumiarzhitskaya, Natallia Safronnikava, Yulia Nestsiarenka	43.06	q
6	3	Cuba	Misleydis Lazo, Ana López, Roxana Díaz, Virgen Benavides	43.60	
	6	Netherlands	Annemarie Kramer, Pascal van Assendelft, Jacqueline Poelman, Joan van den Akker	DNF	
	7	Trinidad and Tobago	Ayanna Hutchinson, Wanda Hutson, Fana Ashby, Kelly-Ann Baptiste	DNF	

=== Final ===
Rank	Lane	Nation	Competitors	Time	Notes
1st place, gold medalist(s)	4	Jamaica	Tayna Lawrence, Sherone Simpson, Aleen Bailey, Veronica Campbell	41.73	NR
2nd place, silver medalist(s)	6	Russia	Olga Fyodorova, Yuliya Tabakova, Irina Khabarova, Larisa Kruglova	42.27	
3rd place, bronze medalist(s)	2	France	Veronique Mang, Muriel Hurtis, Sylviane Félix, Christine Arron	42.54	
4	3	Bahamas	Tamicka Clarke, Chandra Sturrup, Shandria Brown, Debbie Ferguson-McKenzie	42.69	SB
5	1	Belarus	Yulia Nestsiarenka, Natallia Safronnikava, Alena Neumiarzhitskaya, Aksana Drahun	42.94	NR
6	7	Belgium	Katleen De Caluwé, Lien Huyghebaert, Elodie Ouedraogo, Kim Gevaert	43.11	
7	8	Nigeria	Gloria Kemasuode, Mercy Nku, Oludamola Osayomi, Endurance Ojokolo	43.42	
	5	United States	Angela Williams, Marion Jones, Lauryn Williams, LaTasha Colander	~~DNF~~, DQ	
