= Angela Daigle =

American sprinter (born 1976)

Personal information
- Born: May 28, 1976 (age 50) San Francisco, California, United States

Sport
- Sport: Track and field
- Club: Fresno State Bulldogs
Medal record
Representing United States
World Championships
Gold medal – first place	2005 Helsinki	4 × 100 m relay
Pan American Games
Gold medal – first place	2003 Santo Domingo	4 × 100 m relay

Angela Daigle (born May 28, 1976, in San Francisco, California) is an American sprinter. She graduated from Fresno State University in 1999 and competed for the Fresno State Bulldogs team.

Together with Muna Lee, Me'Lisa Barber and Lauryn Williams she won a gold medal in 4 × 100 metres relay at the 2005 World Championships in Athletics. She had previously won a relay gold medal at the 2003 Pan American Games.

She was the American national champion in the 60-meter dash in 2005.

== Personal bests ==
- 100 metres - 11.23 (2003)
- 200 metres - 22.59 (2004)

== External ==
- Angela Daigle at World Athletics
