= Vladislav Kozhemyakin =

Vladislav Kozhemyakin may refer to:

- Vladislav Kozhemyakin (footballer, born 1983), Russian football player
- Vladislav Kozhemyakin (footballer, born 2001), Russian football player
