= Kozhemyakin =

Kozhemyakin (Russian: Кожемякин, from кожемяка meaning a leather worker) is a Russian masculine surname, its feminine counterpart is Kozhemyakina. It may refer to

- Anatoli Kozhemyakin (1953–1974), Russian football player
- Andriy Kozhemiakin (born 1965), Ukrainian politician and former security service officer
- Iryna Kozhemyakina (born 1980), Ukrainian sprinter
- Oleg Kozhemyakin (born 1995), Russian football player
- Vladislav Kozhemyakin (footballer, born 1983), Russian football player
- Vladislav Kozhemyakin (footballer, born 2001), Russian football player
