= Kozhemyaka =

Kozhemyaka (Russian: Кожемяка, Ukrainian: Кожум'я́ка, meaning a leather worker, tanner) is a gender-neutral Russian surname. It may refer to

- Nikita the Tanner (Nikita Kozhemyaka), East Slavic folk hero
- Stepan Kozhumyaka (1898–1989), Ukrainian engineer, bridge-builder and linguist

== See also ==
- Kozhemyakin, derivative surname
