= Angela Williams (sprinter, born 1980) =

American athlete

Personal information
- Born: January 30, 1980 (age 46) Bellflower, California, United States

Sport
- Sport: Track and field
Medal record
Women's athletics
Representing United States
World Championships
Silver medal – second place	2003 Paris	4 × 100 m relay
Pan American Games
Gold medal – first place	2003 Santo Domingo	4 x 100 m relay
Silver medal – second place	1999 Winnipeg	100 m
Silver medal – second place	1999 Winnipeg	4 x 100 m relay
Silver medal – second place	2003 Santo Domingo	100 m
World Indoor Championships
Gold medal – first place	2008 Valencia	60 m
Gold medal – first place	2003 Birmingham	60 m
Silver medal – second place	2001 Lisbon	60 m
Summer Universiade
Gold medal – first place	1999 Palma de Mallorca	100 m
Gold medal – first place	1999 Palma de Mallorca	4 x 100 m relay

Angela Tramaine Williams (born January 30, 1980) is an American retired athlete. Williams attended the University of Southern California, graduating in 2002. She won the Honda Sports Award as the nation's best female track and field competitor in 2002, which qualified her as a nominee for the Honda-Broderick Cup, awarded to the best overall female collegiate athlete in 12 sports. She was named the winner of that award also in 2002.

Starting for the American national team in 2001, she won a silver medal in the 60 metres competition at the 2001 IAAF World Indoor Championships. She later repeated the event at the 2003 Indoor Championships, but was upgraded to gold winner after Zhanna Block was disqualified for doping. At the 2003 World Championships in Athletics she won silver in the 4 × 100 m relay, along with teammates Chryste Gaines, Inger Miller, and Torri Edwards. Williams also competed in the 4 × 100 metres relay at the 2004 Summer Olympics, with the American team easily winning in the first heat but not being able to finish in the final. In 2002, Angela Williams became the first person to win four consecutive individual NCAA titles in the 100 m. In 1999, she won in 11.04 at the age of 19. In 2000, she clocked 11.12, 11.05w in 2001 and 11.29 in 2002.

Williams represented the United States at the 2008 Summer Olympics in Beijing. She competed at the 4 × 100 metres relay together with Mechelle Lewis, Torri Edwards and Lauryn Williams. In their first round heat they were disqualified and eliminated from the final.

Williams had a successful career as a youth athlete, setting the still currently ratified American records in the 100 meters, for age 9–10, 11–12, and 15–16, along with the 11–12 record for 200 meters.

Williams attended Chino High School and won the CIF California State Championships in the 100 metres in 1997 and 1998. Her 11.10 1998 winning time was the top mark of the twentieth century, beating Marion Jones. She also won the 200 metres in 1998 In 1997 and 1998 she was named the national Girl's "High School Athlete of the Year" by Track & Field News. She was the fourth female, and the fourth female California sprinter, to receive the honor twice.

Williams was inducted into the USTFCCCA Collegiate Athlete Hall of Fame in 2024.
