= Misleydis Lazo =

Cuban sprinter

Personal information
- Nationality: Cuban
- Born: 7 September 1981 (age 44)

Sport
- Sport: Sprinting
- Event: 4 × 100 metres relay

Misleydis Lazo (born 7 September 1981) is a Cuban sprinter. She competed in the women's 4 × 100 metres relay at the 2004 Summer Olympics.
