= Christine Arron =

French sprinter (born 1973)

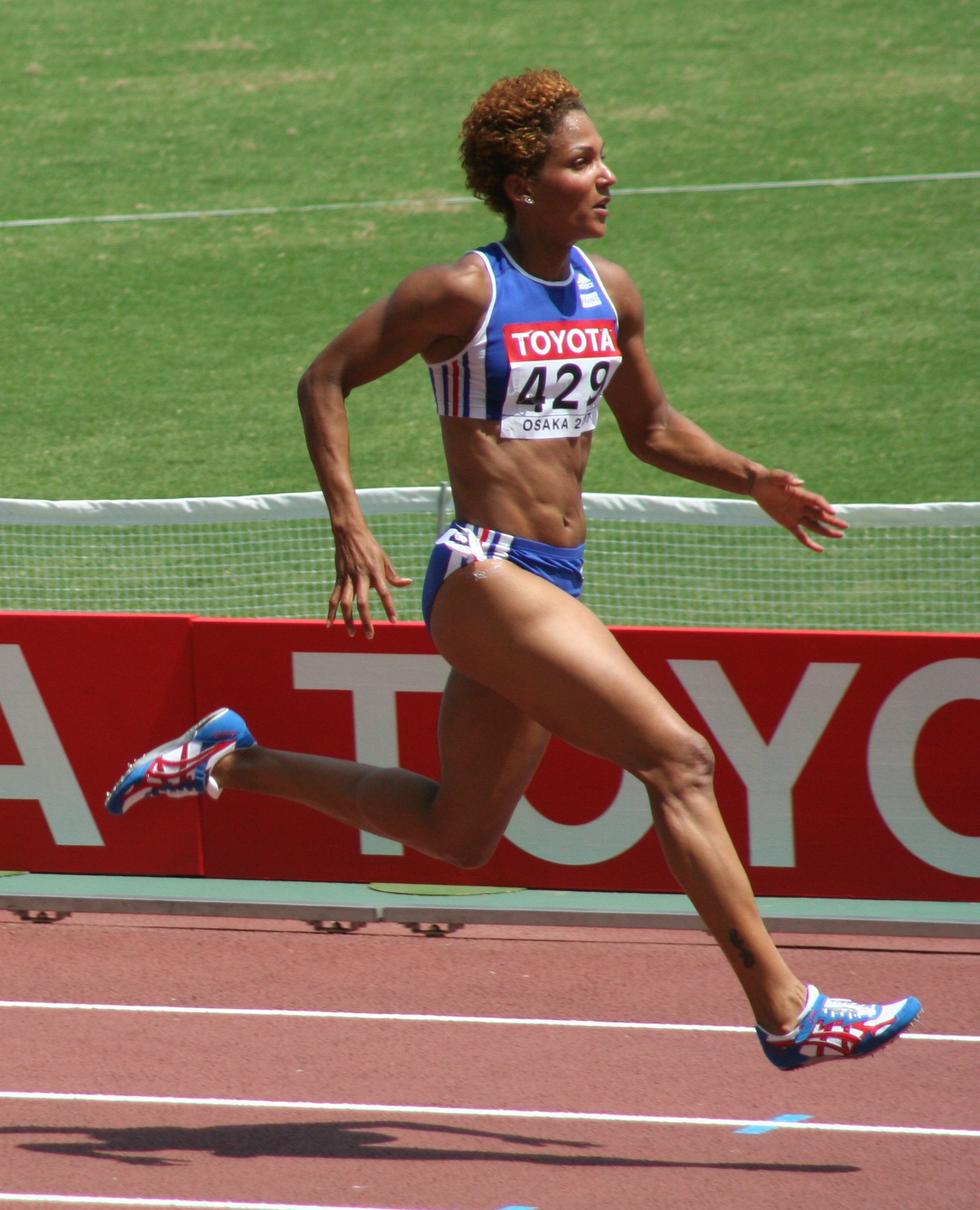
- Christine Arron at the 2007 World Championships in Athletics

Personal information
- Nationality: French
- Born: 13 September 1973 (age 52) Les Abymes, Guadeloupe, France
- Height: 1.77 m (5 ft 10 in)
- Weight: 64 kg (141 lb)

Sport
- Sport: Sprint
- Event(s): 60 metres, 100 metres, 200 metres and the 4 × 100 metres relay
Medal record
Women's athletics
Representing France
Olympic Games
Bronze medal – third place	2004 Athens	4 × 100 m relay
World Championships
Gold medal – first place	2003 Paris	4 × 100 m relay
Silver medal – second place	1999 Seville	4 × 100 m relay
Bronze medal – third place	1997 Athens	4 × 100 m relay
Bronze medal – third place	2005 Helsinki	100 m
Bronze medal – third place	2005 Helsinki	200 m
European Championships
Gold medal – first place	1998 Budapest	100 m
Gold medal – first place	1998 Budapest	4 × 100 m relay
Silver medal – second place	2010 Barcelona	4 × 100 m relay
Mediterranean Games
Gold medal – first place	1997 Bari	200 m
Gold medal – first place	1997 Bari	4 × 100 m relay

Christine Arron (born 13 September 1973) is a French former track and field sprinter, who competed internationally for France in the 60 metres, 100 metres, 200 metres and the 4 × 100 metres relay. She is one of the fastest female 100 metres sprinters of all time with a time of 10.73 seconds set in 1998. At the time it made her the world's second-fastest female 100 metres sprinter of all time, and which as of October 2025 is still the European record. She set the record when winning at the 1998 European Championships, where she also won a gold medal in the 4 × 100 m relay. Also in the relay, she is a 2003 World Championship gold medallist and a 2004 Olympic bronze medallist.

== Running career ==
Born in Les Abymes, Guadeloupe, Arron arrived in Metropolitan France in 1990 and first trained with Fernand Urtebise, who also coached the former 400 metres hurdles and 4 × 400 metres relay world champion Stephane Diagana.

On 19 Aug 1998, Arron won the 100 metres gold medal at the 1998 European Championships in Budapest by finishing the final in a new European record time of 10.73 seconds. Her time of 10.73 seconds made her then the world's second-fastest ever, female 100 metres sprinter, behind Florence Griffith-Joyner (10.49 seconds, set in 1988). She also won the 4 × 100 metres relay gold medal at the same championships. She was named the 1998 European Women's Athlete of the Year.

In 2001, after a heavy training period in the US with John Smith and the HSI group, Arron quit training for a year, saying she was physically exhausted from the experience. "It was hell. Every morning I wondered how I was going to put up with the burden of training." She had a hip injury which kept her out of the 2001 World Championships.

Arron was also the anchor runner of the French 4 × 100 relay team which upset the heavy favourites the US to win the gold medal at the 2003 World Championships in Paris. She recovered from 3 m behind the newly crowned, 100 m 2003 World Champion, Torri Edwards, to give the home crowd at the Stade de France an unexpected joy.

Arron won her only Olympic medal, a bronze medal, in the 4 × 100 m relay at the 2004 Olympic Games in Athens, Greece.

In August 2005, Arron won a bronze medal in the 100 metres and 200 metres at the 2005 World Championships.

At the 2008 Olympic Games in Beijing, Arron competed in the 100 metres event. In her first round heat, she placed first in front of Lauryn Williams and Tahesia Harrigan in a time of 11.37 sec to advance to the second round. But in the second round, she failed to advance to the semi-finals as her time of 11.36 sec was only the fourth fastest time of her heat, behind Debbie Ferguson, Oludamola Osayomi and Vida Anim, causing her elimination from the event.

As of March 2025, Arron is the world's tenth-fastest female 100 metres sprinter (10.73 sec) of all time. Considering the controversy surrounding the performances of the world record-holder (10.49 sec, set in 1988), Florence Griffith-Joyner, many considered Arron's time of 10.73 sec. set during the 1998 European Championships to be the 'true' world record. Besides Griffith-Joyner, only Marion Jones, Carmelita Jeter, Shelly-Ann Fraser-Pryce, Elaine Thompson-Herah, Shericka Jackson, Marie-Josée Ta Lou, Julien Alfred, and Sha'Carri Richardson have run faster than Arron in the 100 metres.

In December 2012, Arron announced her retirement from athletics. She was expecting her second child then. She did not rule out the possibility of returning to athletics competition after the birth of her second child.

On 9 October 2013, Arron was awarded the Chevalier de la Légion d'honneur by French President François Hollande in the Élysée Palace.

== Views on doping ==
Arron has voiced her annoyance with Marion Jones, her fiercest rival during her career: "She has lied for years [...] She treated everyone as idiots. I'm not shocked she is going to jail. Many people criticised me because I was always the one who lost in the Jones-Arron battle, even if I had very good results. We started running together in 1997. She has stolen my best years. Everything could have been different for me."

== Family ==
In 2002, Arron gave birth to her first child, a son by the name of Ethan. On 16 May 2013, Arron gave birth to her second child, a daughter by the name of Cassandre. Cassandre's father Benjamin Compaoré, a French triple jumper, became Arron's companion in 2009.

== Achievements ==
Year	Competition	Venue	Position	Event	Notes
Representing Guadeloupe
1988	1988 CARIFTA Games (youth)	Kingston, Jamaica	3rd	100 m	12.04
1992	1992 CARIFTA Games (junior)	Nassau, Bahamas	1st	100 m	11.31 w
1992	1992 CARIFTA Games (junior)	Nassau, Bahamas	3rd	4 × 100 m	45.79
Representing France
1992	World Junior Championships	Seoul, South Korea	12th (sf)	100 m	11.85 (wind: +1.2 m/s)
1992	World Junior Championships	Seoul, South Korea	5th	4 × 100 m relay	44.70
1997	Mediterranean Games	Bari, Italy	1st	200 m	22.62
1997	Mediterranean Games	Bari, Italy	1st	4 × 100 m	42.63
1997	World Championships	Athens, Greece	4th	100 m	11.05
1997	World Championships	Athens, Greece	3rd	4 × 100 m	42.21
1998	European Championships	Budapest, Hungary	1st	100 m	10.73
1998	European Championships	Budapest, Hungary	1st	4 × 100 m	42.59
1999	World Championships	Seville, Spain	6th	100 m	10.97
1999	World Championships	Seville, Spain	2nd	4 × 100 m	42.06
2000	Olympic Games	Sydney, Australia	semi-final	100 m	11.42 (11.26)
2000	Olympic Games	Sydney, Australia	4th	4 × 100 m	42.42
2003	World Championships	Paris, France	4th	100 m	11.06
2003	World Championships	Paris, France	1st	4 × 100 m	41.78
2004	Olympic Games	Athens, Greece	semi-final	100 m	11.21 (11.10)
2004	Olympic Games	Athens, Greece	semi-final	200 m	23.05
2004	Olympic Games	Athens, Greece	3rd	4 × 100 m	42.54
2005	World Championships	Helsinki, Finland	3rd	100 m	10.98
2005	World Championships	Helsinki, Finland	3rd	200 m	22.31
2005	World Championships	Helsinki, Finland	4th	4 × 100 m	42.85
2006	World Indoor Championships	Moscow, Russia	4th	60 m	7.13 (7.11)
2008	Olympic Games	Beijing, China	quarter-final	100 m	11.36
2010	European Championships	Barcelona, Spain	8th	100 m	11.37 (11.24)
2010	European Championships	Barcelona, Spain	2nd	4 × 100 m	42.45
2012	European Championships	Helsinki, Finland	heats	100 m	11.55
2012	European Championships	Helsinki, Finland	5th	4 × 100 m	43.44

Note: Results in brackets indicate a superior time achieved in an earlier round.

Records
Preceded by Irina Privalova	Women's 100 m European Record Holder; 19 August 1998 –	Succeeded by Incumbent
Awards
Preceded by Astrid Kumbernuss	Women's European Athlete of the Year; 1998	Succeeded by Gabriela Szabo
