= Olga Stulneva =

Russian athlete and bobsledder (born 1983)

Personal information
- Full name: Olga Olegovna Stulneva
- Born: July 14, 1983 (age 42) Alapayevsk, Russian SFSR

Sport
- Country: Russia
- Sport: Women's athletics
Medal record
Olympic Games
Silver medal – second place	2004 Athens	4×100 m relay
World Championships
Bronze medal – third place	2003 Paris	4x100 m relay

Olga Olegovna Stulneva (Russian: Ольга Олеговна Фёдорова, née Fyodorova, sometimes listed as Fedorova; born July 14, 1983, in Alapayevsk, Russian SFSR) is a Russian athlete and bobsledder. She's married with bobsledder Alexey Stulnev.

== Athletics career ==
Mainly competing in the 100 metres, her greatest success has come in relay races, where she earned an Olympic silver medal in the 4 × 100 m relay at the 2004 Summer Olympics in Athens.

=== Personal bests ===
- 100 metres – 11.21 (2005)
- 200 metres – 23.19 (2004)

=== International competitions ===
Representing Russia
Year	Competition	Venue	Position	Event	Time	Notes
2002	World Junior Championships	Kingston, Jamaica	24th (sf)	100 m	20.01	wind: +0.9 m/s
2003	World Championships	Paris, France	3rd	4 × 100 m relay	42.66	
2004	Summer Olympics	Athens, Greece	2nd	4 × 100 m relay	42.27	

== Bobsleigh career ==
Switching to bobsleigh in 2006, Fyodorova's best World Cup finish was fifth twice with one in 2006 and on in 2008.

Her best finish at the FIBT World Championships was seventh in the two-woman event at St. Moritz in 2007. Fyodorova finished 18th in the two-woman event at the 2010 Winter Olympics in Vancouver. She competed at the 2014 Winter Olympics in the two-woman event where she finished in 9th place but was disqualified for a doping violation on 24 November 2017.

== Education ==
In 2008 Stulneva graduated from the chair "Multimedia Technology" of the Ural State Technical University in Ekaterinburg majoring in computer science.

== See also ==
- List of athletes who competed in both the Summer and Winter Olympics
- List of doping cases in athletics
- List of multi-sport athletes
