= 2003 World Championships in Athletics =

Athletics competition in Saint-Denis, France

IX World Championships in Athletics Championnats du monde d'athlétisme-Saint-Denis
- Host city: Saint-Denis, France
- Nations: 198
- Athletes: 1679
- Dates: 23–31 August 2003
- Opened by: Prime Minister Jean-Pierre Raffarin
- Closed by: IAAF President Lamine Diack
- Main venue: Stade de France

The 9th World Championships in Athletics (French: Championnats du monde d'athlétisme 2003), under the auspices of the International Association of Athletics Federations, were held from 23 August to 31 August 2003 in the streets of Paris and the Stade de France in Saint-Denis, Seine-Saint-Denis, France.

== Men's results ==
=== Track ===
1999 | 2001 | 2003 | 2005 | 2007

Event	Gold		Silver		Bronze	
100 m	Kim Collins; Saint Kitts and Nevis	10.07	Darrel Brown; Trinidad and Tobago	10.08	Darren Campbell; Great Britain	10.08 (SB)
200 m	John Capel; United States	20.30	Darvis Patton; United States	20.31	Shingo Suetsugu; Japan	20.38
400 m	Tyree Washington; United States	44.77^{1}	Marc Raquil; France	44.79 (NR)	Michael Blackwood; Jamaica	44.80
800 m	Djabir Saïd-Guerni; Algeria	1:44.81	Yuriy Borzakovskiy; Russia	1:44.84	Mbulaeni Mulaudzi; South Africa	1:44.90
1500 m	Hicham El Guerrouj; Morocco	3:31.77	Mehdi Baala; France	3:32.31	Ivan Heshko; Ukraine	3:33.17
5000 m	Eliud Kipchoge; Kenya	12:52.79 (CR)	Hicham El Guerrouj; Morocco	12:52.83	Kenenisa Bekele; Ethiopia	12:53.12
10,000 m	Kenenisa Bekele; Ethiopia	26:49.57 (CR)	Haile Gebrselassie; Ethiopia	26:50.77 (SB)	Sileshi Sihine; Ethiopia	27:01.44
Marathon	Jaouad Gharib; Morocco	2:08:31 (CR)	Julio Rey; Spain	2:08:38	Stefano Baldini; Italy	2:09:14
110 m hurdles	Allen Johnson; United States	13.12	Terrence Trammell; United States	13.20 (SB)	Liu Xiang; China	13.23
400 m hurdles	Félix Sánchez; Dominican Republic	47.25 (WL)	Joey Woody; United States	48.18 (SB)	Periklís Iakovákis; Greece	48.24
3000 m steeplechase	Saif Saaeed Shaheen; Qatar	8:04.39	Ezekiel Kemboi; Kenya	8:05.11	Eliseo Martin; Spain	8:09.09 (PB)
20 km race walk	Jefferson Pérez; Ecuador	1:17:21 (WBP)	Paquillo Fernández; Spain	1:18:00 (SB)	Roman Rasskazov; Russia	1:18:07 (SB)
50 km race walk	Robert Korzeniowski; Poland	3:36:03 (WBP)	German Skurygin; Russia	3:36:42 (NR)	Andreas Erm; Germany	3:37:46 (NR)
4 × 100 m relay	United States (USA); John Capel; Bernard Williams; Darvis Patton; Joshua J. Johnson	38.06	Brazil (BRA); Vicente de Lima; Édson Ribeiro; André da Silva; Cláudio Roberto Souza	38.26 (SB)	Netherlands (NED); Timothy Beck; Troy Douglas; Patrick van Balkom; Caimin Douglas; Guus Hoogmoed*	38.87
4 × 400 m relay	France (FRA); Leslie Djhone; Naman Keïta; Stéphane Diagana; Marc Raquil; Ahmed Douhou*	2:58.96^{2} (NR)	Jamaica (JAM); Brandon Simpson; Danny McFarlane; Davian Clarke; Michael Blackwood; Michael Campbell*; Lansford Spence*	2:59.60 (SB)	Bahamas (BAH); Avard Moncur; Dennis Darling; Nathaniel McKinney; Chris Brown; Carl Oliver*	3:00.53 (SB)
WR world record | AR area record | CR championship record | GR games record | NR national record | OR Olympic record | PB personal best | SB season best | WL world leading (in a given season)

Note: * Indicates athletes who ran in preliminary rounds.
^{1} Jerome Young of the United States originally finished first in 44.50, but was disqualified after he tested positive for drugs in 2004.
^{2} The United States (Calvin Harrison, Tyree Washington, Derrick Brew, Jerome Young) originally finished first in 2:58.88, but were disqualified after Jerome Young and Calvin Harrison both tested positive for drugs in 2004.

=== Field ===
1999 | 2001 | 2003 | 2005 | 2007

Event	Gold		Silver		Bronze	
High jump	Jacques Freitag; South Africa	2.35 (SB)	Stefan Holm; Sweden	2.32	Mark Boswell; Canada	2.32 (SB)
Long jump	Dwight Phillips; United States	8.32	James Beckford; Jamaica	8.28 (SB)	Yago Lamela; Spain	8.22
Pole vault	Giuseppe Gibilisco; Italy	5.90 (NR)	Okkert Brits; South Africa	5.85 (SB)	Patrik Kristiansson; Sweden	5.85 (PB)
Triple jump	Christian Olsson; Sweden	17.72	Yoandri Betanzos; Cuba	17.28 (SB)	Leevan Sands; Bahamas	17.26
Shot put	Andrei Mikhnevich; Belarus	21.69 (PB)	Adam Nelson; United States	21.26	Yuriy Bilonoh; Ukraine	21.10
Discus	Virgilijus Alekna; Lithuania	69.69 (SB)	Róbert Fazekas; Hungary	69.01	Vasiliy Kaptyukh; Belarus	66.51 (SB)
Javelin	Sergey Makarov; Russia	85.44	Andrus Värnik; Estonia	85.17	Boris Henry; Germany	84.74
Hammer	Ivan Tikhon; Belarus	83.05	Adrián Annus; Hungary	80.36	Koji Murofushi; Japan	80.12
Decathlon	Tom Pappas; United States	8750	Roman Šebrle; Czech Republic	8634	Dmitry Karpov; Kazakhstan	8374 (NR)
WR world record | AR area record | CR championship record | GR games record | NR national record | OR Olympic record | PB personal best | SB season best | WL world leading (in a given season)

== Women's results ==
=== Track ===
1999 | 2001 | 2003 | 2005 | 2007

Event	Gold		Silver		Bronze	
100 m	Torri Edwards; United States	10.93 (PB)	Chandra Sturrup; Bahamas	11.02	Ekaterini Thanou; Greece	11.03 (SB)
200 m	Anastasiya Kapachinskaya; Russia	22.38 (PB)	Torri Edwards; United States	22.47	Muriel Hurtis; France	22.59
400 m	Ana Guevara; Mexico	48.89 (PB)	Lorraine Fenton; Jamaica	49.43 (SB)	Amy Mbacké Thiam; Senegal	49.95 (SB)
800 m	Maria Mutola; Mozambique	1:59.89	Kelly Holmes; Great Britain	2:00.18	Natalya Khrushchelyova; Russia	2:00.29
1500 m	Tatyana Tomashova; Russia	3:58.52 (CR)	Süreyya Ayhan; Turkey	3:59.04	Hayley Tullett; Great Britain	3:59.95 (PB)
5000 m	Tirunesh Dibaba; Ethiopia	14:51.72	Marta Domínguez; Spain	14:52.26	Edith Masai; Kenya	14:52.30
10,000 m	Berhane Adere; Ethiopia	30:04.18 (CR)	Werknesh Kidane; Ethiopia	30:07.15 (PB)	Sun Yingjie; China	30:07.20 (PB)
Marathon	Catherine Ndereba; Kenya	2:23:55 (CR)	Mizuki Noguchi; Japan	2:24:14	Masako Chiba; Japan	2:25:09
100 m hurdles	Perdita Felicien; Canada	12.53 (NR)	Brigitte Foster; Jamaica	12.57	Miesha McKelvy; United States	12.67
400 m hurdles	Jana Pittman; Australia	53.22 (PB)	Sandra Glover; United States	53.65 (SB)	Yuliya Pechonkina; Russia	53.71
20 km walk	Yelena Nikolayeva; Russia	1:26:52 (CR)	Gillian O'Sullivan; Ireland	1:27:34	Valentina Tsybulskaya; Belarus	1:28:10 (NR)
4 × 100 m relay	France (FRA); Patricia Girard-Léno; Muriel Hurtis; Sylviane Félix; Christine Arron	41.78 (WL)	United States (USA); Angela Williams; Chryste Gaines; Inger Miller; Torri Edwards; Lauryn Williams*	41.83 (SB)	Russia (RUS); Olga Fyodorova; Yuliya Tabakova; Marina Kislova; Larisa Kruglova	42.66
4 × 400 m relay	United States (USA); Demetria Washington; Jearl Miles Clark; Me'Lisa Barber; Sanya Richards; DeeDee Trotter*	3:22.63 (WL)	Russia (RUS); Anastasiya Kapachinskaya; Natalya Nazarova; Olesya Zykina; Yuliya Pechonkina (Nosova); Svetlana Pospelova*; Svetlana Goncharenko*	3:22.91 (SB)	Jamaica (JAM); Allison Beckford; Lorraine Fenton (Graham); Ronetta Smith; Sandie Richards; Michelle Burgher*	3:22.92 (SB)
WR world record | AR area record | CR championship record | GR games record | NR national record | OR Olympic record | PB personal best | SB season best | WL world leading (in a given season)

Note: * Indicates medalists who ran in preliminary rounds.

=== Field ===
1999 | 2001 | 2003 | 2005 | 2007

Event	Gold		Silver		Bronze	
High jump	Hestrie Cloete; South Africa	2.06 (WL, AR)	Marina Kuptsova; Russia	2.00	Kajsa Bergqvist; Sweden	2.00
Pole vault	Svetlana Feofanova; Russia	4.75 (CR)	Annika Becker; Germany	4.70 (SB)	Yelena Isinbayeva; Russia	4.65
Long jump	Eunice Barber; France	6.99 (SB)	Tatyana Kotova; Russia	6.74	Anju Bobby George; India	6.70 (SB)
Triple jump	Tatyana Lebedeva; Russia	15.18 (SB)	Françoise Mbango Etone; Cameroon	15.05 (AR)	Magdelín Martínez; Italy	14.90 (NR)
Shot put	Svetlana Krivelyova; Russia	20.63	Nadzeya Astapchuk; Belarus	20.12 (PB)	Vita Pavlysh; Ukraine	20.08 (SB)
Discus throw	Irina Yatchenko; Belarus	67.32 (SB)	Anastasia Kelesidou; Greece	67.14 (SB)	Ekaterini Voggoli; Greece	66.73 (PB)
Hammer throw	Yipsi Moreno; Cuba	73.33	Olga Kuzenkova; Russia	71.71	Manuela Montebrun; France	70.92
Javelin throw	Mirela Manjani; Greece	66.52 (WL)	Tatyana Shikolenko; Russia	63.28	Steffi Nerius; Germany	62.70
Heptathlon	Carolina Klüft; Sweden	7001 (WL)	Eunice Barber; France	6755 (SB)	Natallia Sazanovich; Belarus	6524 (SB)
Heptathlon	Swedish Carolina Klüft won with big margin following a breaking of her personal best in six of the seven events and the totals. She was the third woman ever to score more than 7000 points.					
WR world record | AR area record | CR championship record | GR games record | NR national record | OR Olympic record | PB personal best | SB season best | WL world leading (in a given season)

== Medal table ==
* Host nation (France)

Rank	Nation	Gold	Silver	Bronze	Total
1	United States (USA)	8	7	1	16
2	Russia (RUS)	7	7	5	19
3	France (FRA)*	3	3	2	8
4	Ethiopia (ETH)	3	2	2	7
5	Belarus (BLR)	3	1	3	7
6	Sweden (SWE)	2	1	2	5
7	Kenya (KEN)	2	1	1	4
7	South Africa (RSA)	2	1	1	4
9	Morocco (MAR)	2	1	0	3
10	Greece (GRE)	1	1	3	5
11	Cuba (CUB)	1	1	0	2
12	Italy (ITA)	1	0	2	3
13	Canada (CAN)	1	0	1	2
14	Algeria (ALG)	1	0	0	1
14	Australia (AUS)	1	0	0	1
14	Dominican Republic (DOM)	1	0	0	1
14	Ecuador (ECU)	1	0	0	1
14	Lithuania (LTU)	1	0	0	1
14	Mexico (MEX)	1	0	0	1
14	Mozambique (MOZ)	1	0	0	1
14	Poland (POL)	1	0	0	1
14	Qatar (QAT)	1	0	0	1
14	Saint Kitts and Nevis (SKN)	1	0	0	1
24	Jamaica (JAM)	0	4	2	6
25	Spain (ESP)	0	3	2	5
26	Hungary (HUN)	0	2	0	2
27	Germany (GER)	0	1	3	4
27	Japan (JPN)	0	1	3	4
29	Bahamas (BAH)	0	1	2	3
29	Great Britain (GBR)	0	1	2	3
31	Brazil (BRA)	0	1	0	1
31	Cameroon (CMR)	0	1	0	1
31	Czech Republic (CZE)	0	1	0	1
31	Estonia (EST)	0	1	0	1
31	Ireland (IRL)	0	1	0	1
31	Trinidad and Tobago (TRI)	0	1	0	1
31	Turkey (TUR)	0	1	0	1
38	Ukraine (UKR)	0	0	3	3
39	China (CHN)	0	0	2	2
40	India (IND)	0	0	1	1
40	Kazakhstan (KAZ)	0	0	1	1
40	Netherlands (NED)	0	0	1	1
40	Senegal (SEN)	0	0	1	1
Totals (43 entries)		46	46	46	138
