= Lauryn Williams =

American sprinter and bobsledder

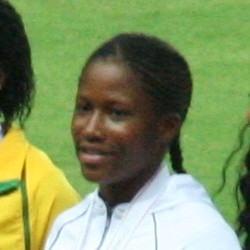

Personal information
- Born: September 11, 1983 (age 42) Rochester, Pennsylvania, U.S.
- Education: University of Miami
- Height: 5 ft 3 in (160 cm)
- Weight: 127 lb (58 kg)

Sport
- Country: United States
- Club: Florida
- Turned pro: 2004

Achievements and titles
- Olympic finals: 2nd Athens 2004– 100 metres
- World finals: 1st Helsinki 2005– 100 metres
- Highest world ranking: 2
- Personal bests: 100 m- 10.88; 200 m- 22.27
Medal record
Women's athletics
Representing the United States
Olympic Games
Gold medal – first place	2012 London	4 × 100 m relay
Silver medal – second place	2004 Athens	100 meters
World Championships
Silver medal – second place	2003 Paris	4 × 100 m relay
Gold medal – first place	2005 Helsinki	100 meters
Gold medal – first place	2005 Helsinki	4 × 100 m relay
Gold medal – first place	2007 Osaka	4 × 100 m relay
Silver medal – second place	2007 Osaka	100 meters
World Indoor Championships
Silver medal – second place	2006 Moscow	60 meters
World Athletics Final
Bronze medal – third place	2004 Monaco	100 meters
Bronze medal – third place	2005 Monaco	100 meters
World Junior Championships
Gold medal – first place	2002 Kingston	100 meters
Silver medal – second place	2002 Kingston	4 × 100 m relay
Pan American Games
Gold medal – first place	2003 Santo Domingo	100 meters
Women's bobsleigh
Representing the United States
Olympic Games
Silver medal – second place	2014 Sochi	Two-woman
- Updated on February 19, 2014

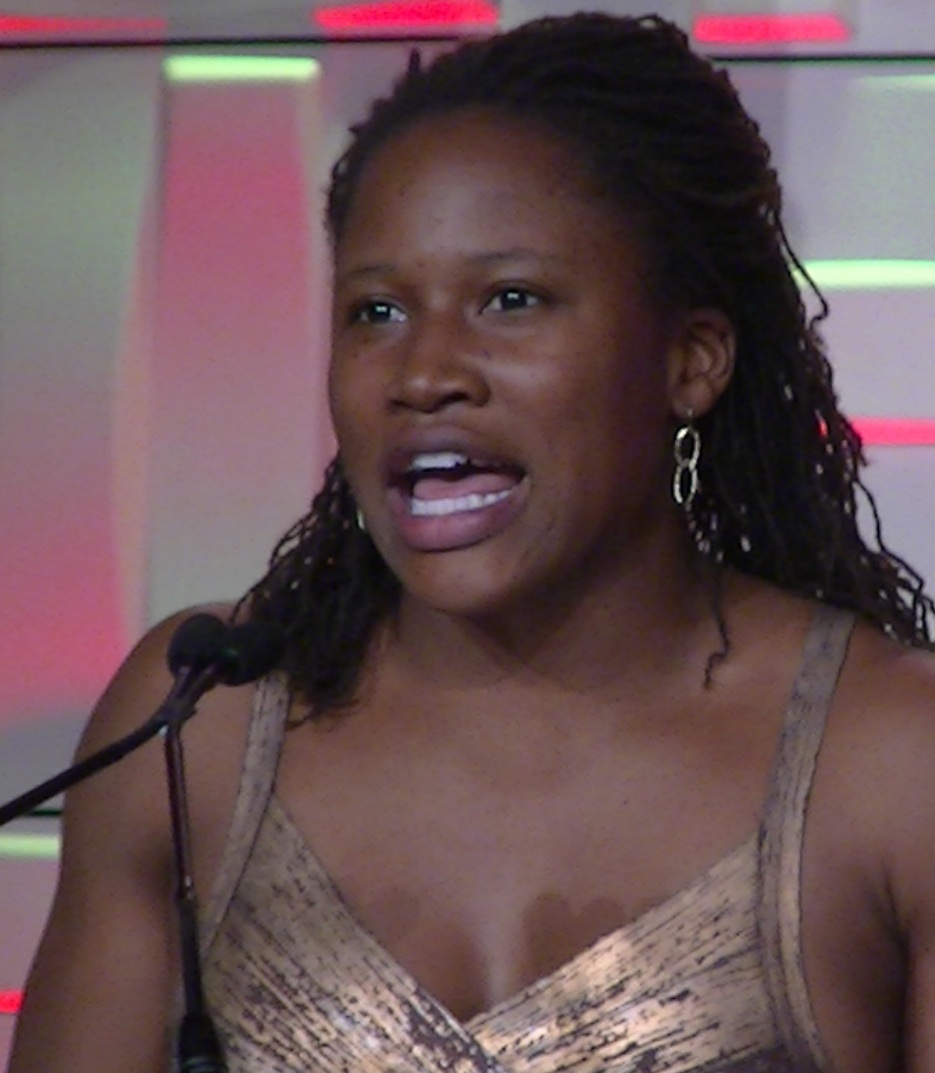
Lauryn Williams speaking at the USA Track & Field national meeting, December 2014

Lauryn Williams (born September 11, 1983) is an American sprinter and bobsledder. She was the gold medalist in the 100 meter dash at the 2005 World Championships in Athletics and won silver medals at the 2004 Summer Olympics, 2007 World Championships, and 2006 IAAF World Indoor Championships. She won a silver medal in the two-woman bobsleigh at the 2014 Winter Olympics.

A World Junior Champion in 2002, she went on to win the 100 m at the 2003 Pan American Games and claimed the NCAA title over the distance for the University of Miami the following year. She has also featured as part of the American 4 × 100 meter relay team, winning gold medals at the 2005 and 2007 World Championships and at the 2012 Summer Olympics.

Williams is one of six athletes to have won a medal in both the Summer and Winter Olympic games, as well as the first American woman to do so.

== Career ==
Williams was born in Rochester, Pennsylvania and raised in suburban Pittsburgh and Detroit. She currently resides in suburban Pittsburgh. She holds her high school records for the 100, 200 m, long jump and 4 × 100 meters relay. She ran for The Wings of Moon Track Club founded by Coach Rubin Carter based in Moon Township, Pennsylvania, a suburb near Pittsburgh. She was a star with the new club and qualified for the National Junior Olympics.

== College ==
She attended the University of Miami, where she competed on the track team and graduated in 2004. She was inducted into the Iron Arrow Honor Society, the university's highest honor.

== Track career ==
Williams was a part of the 4 × 100 meter relay team at the 2003 World Championships in Athletics, where she anchored the American team with Angela Williams, Chryste Gaines and Inger Miller in their heat. She did not run in the final.

Later that season, she participated in the 2003 Pan American Games in the 100 metre event. She went on to claim gold in a time of 11.12, followed closely by Angela Williams and Liliana Allen.

Williams is a silver medalist in the 100 meters at the 2004 Summer Olympics and a 4-time medalist at the World Championships in Athletics, where she won (together with Angela Daigle, Muna Lee and Me'Lisa Barber) a gold medal in the 4 × 100 m relay in 2005 and 2007, as well as gold and silver in the 100 m in 2005 and 2007 editions of the meet.

At the 2004 Summer Olympics, Williams ran the third leg for the women's 4 × 100 relay team in the final. Marion Jones, who ran the second leg, and Williams failed to complete the baton exchange within the 20-meter passing zone, resulting in disqualification of the U.S. team.

In the Beijing Olympics of 2008, Williams ran the anchor leg in the relay, but a mix-up in the semi-final with team-mate Torri Edwards caused Edwards to drop the baton. Williams picked up the baton to finish in last place, but the USA was disqualified because she had had to run outside her lane in order to retrieve the baton. At the individual 100 metres sprint she placed 2nd in her first round heat behind Christine Arron in a time of 11.38 to advance to the second round. There she improved her time to 11.07 seconds and placed 2nd again, this time behind Kerron Stewart. With the third time in her semi final heat behind Shelly-Ann Fraser and Muna Lee she qualified for the final in 11.10 seconds. In the final she came to 11.03, finishing in fourth place, behind three runners from Jamaica.

Williams took third place in the 100 m at the 2009 US Championships and as a result she qualified for the 2009 World Championships in Athletics, her third consecutive championships. A week before the World Championships began, she was part of a United States 4 × 100 m relay team that ran the fastest women's sprint relay in twelve years. Williams, Allyson Felix, Muna Lee and Carmelita Jeter finished with a time of 41.58 seconds, bringing them to eighth on the all-time list.

She spent the entirety of 2010 away from competitive athletics and, among other things, she worked in the athletic department at the University of Miami. She returned to competition in 2011.

In the 2012 Olympics in London, Lauryn Williams ran the anchor leg of 4 × 100 meter relay for USA in the qualification round. The team went on to win gold and earn a new world record with a time of 40.82

== 2014 Winter Olympics ==
On January 19, 2014, Williams won her first bobsled gold medal in a World Cup event at Igls, Austria. She was later selected to be a part of the U.S. Olympic 2014 women's bobsled team.

On February 19, 2014, Williams along with Elana Meyers won the silver medal at the 2014 Winter Olympic Games. Their first run was a time of 57.26, a track record. Their second run was 57.63, the third was 57.69 and fourth was 58.13 for a total of 3:50.71, a difference of +0.10 from first place, just edged out by Canada 1.

Williams is one of six Olympians, three Americans to win medals at the Winter and Summer Olympic Games. Eddie Eagan won Gold as a boxer in 1920 and on the bobsled in 1932. Eddy Alvarez won a silver medal in 2014 as a speedskater and another silver medal in Tokyo for baseball.

== After the Olympics ==
In 2013, Williams became an intern at Briaud Financial Advisors. She later became a certified financial planner, passing the exam in 2017.

== Major achievements ==
Year	Competition	Venue	Position	Event	Notes
Representing the United States
2002	World Junior Championships	Kingston, Jamaica	1st	100 m	11.33 (wind: -0.2 m/s)
2002	World Junior Championships	Kingston, Jamaica	2nd	4 × 100 m relay	43.66
2003	Pan American Games	Santo Domingo, Dominican Republic	1st	100 m	11.12 secs
2004	Olympic Games	Athens, Greece	2nd	100 m	10.96 secs
2004	World Athletics Final	Monaco, Monaco	3rd	100 m	11.21 secs
2005	World Championships	Helsinki, Finland	1st	100 m	10.93 secs
2005	World Athletics Final	Monaco, Monaco	3rd	100 m	11.04 secs
2006	World Indoor Championships	Moscow, Russia	2nd	60 m	7.01 secs
2007	World Championships	Osaka, Japan	2nd	100 m	11.01 secs
2012	Olympic Games	London, Great Britain	1st	4 × 100 m relay	Competed in heats but not in final.
2014	Olympic Games	Sochi, Russia	2nd	2 Woman bobsleigh	3:50.71

== See also ==
- List of multi-sport athletes
- World Fit
