= Maria Karastamati =

Greek sprinter

Medal record

Women's athletics

Representing Greece

European Indoor Championships
Bronze medal – third place	2005 Madrid	60 m

Maria Karastamati (Greek: Μαρία Καρασταμάτη; born 10 December 1984 in Piraeus) is a Greek sprinter who specializes in 60 metres and 100 metres. She was part of the Greek women's 4×100 metres relay team at the 2004 Athens Olympics.

In her first individual appearance in a major competition, at the European Indoor Championships in Madrid she won the bronze medal with 7.25 seconds. The same year, at 100 metres she set an impressive personal best with 11.03, becoming the second fastest Greek female athlete, only behind Katerina Thanou. She made it till the semi-final at the World Championships in Helsinki.

== Personal bests ==
Event	Time	Date	Venue
100 m	11.03	16 July 2005	Erfurt, Germany
60 m	7.19	4 March 2005	Madrid, Spain
