= Sylvie Mballa Éloundou =

French-Cameroonian sprinter (born 1977)

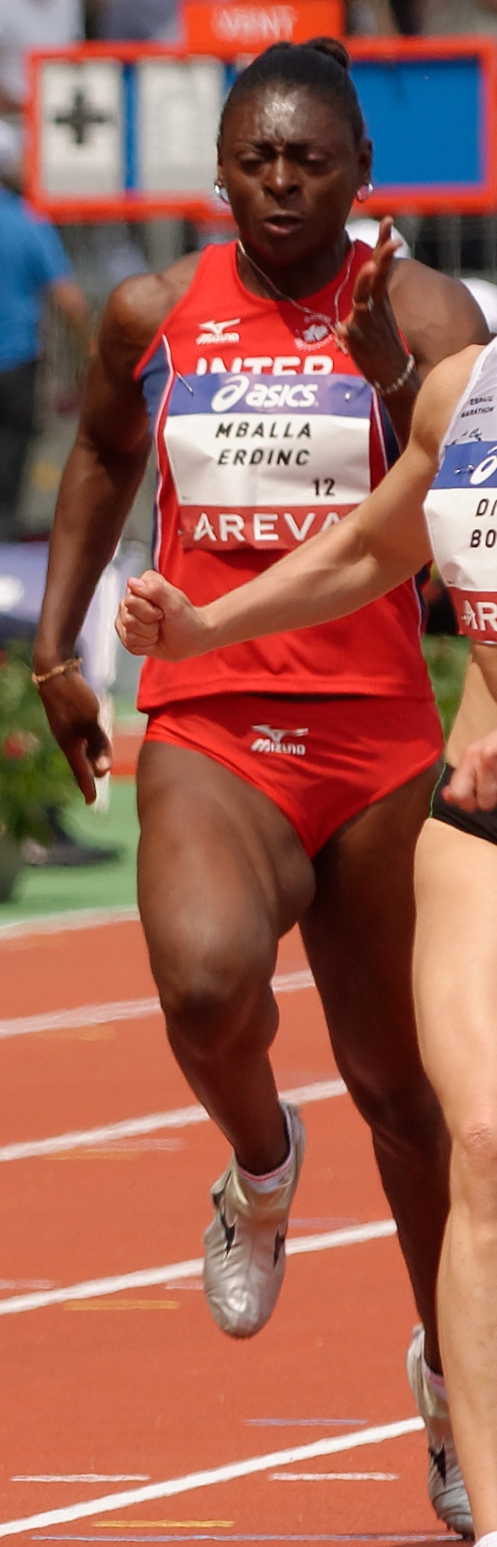
- Sylvie Mballa - Women 100m French Athletics Championships in 2013

Medal record

Women's athletics

Representing Cameroon

African Championships
Bronze medal – third place	1998 Dakar	4×400 m

Sylvie Florence Mballa Éloundou (born 21 April 1977) is a French-Cameroonian sprinter who specializes in the 100 metres.

A native of Yaoundé, the capital of Cameroon, Sylvie Mballa Éloundou originally represented the country of her birth, but changed nationality on 10 October 2002 in order to compete as a member of the French team. Following another change, on 1 April 2005, she once again entered competition under the flag of Cameroon.

Her personal best time for 100 metres is 11.13 seconds, achieved in July 2005 in Angers, however, at the 2006 IAAF World Indoor Championships in Moscow, she finished the 60 metres race in eighth place.
