= Vladislav Kozhemyakin (footballer, born 1983) =

Russian footballer

Personal information
- Full name: Vladislav Vyacheslavovich Kozhemyakin
- Date of birth: 9 February 1983 (age 43)
- Place of birth: Moscow, Russian SFSR
- Height: 1.92 m (6 ft 3 1/2 in)
- Position: Forward

Youth career
- FC Spartak Moscow

Senior career*
Years	Team	Apps	(Gls)
1999–2000	FC Spartak-2 Moscow	28	(2)
2001	FC Chernomorets Novorossiysk	0	(0)
2001–2003	FC Torpedo Moscow	3	(0)
2003	FC Kristall Smolensk	16	(4)
2004	FC Metallurg Lipetsk	32	(4)
2006	FC Spartak Vladikavkaz	3	(1)
2007	FC Lukhovitsy	8	(1)
2009	FC Znamya Truda Orekhovo-Zuyevo	11	(1)
2009	FC Nara-ShBFR Naro-Fominsk	14	(3)
- * Club domestic league appearances and goals

Vladislav Vyacheslavovich Kozhemyakin (Russian: Владислав Вячеславович Кожемякин; born 9 February 1983) is a former Russian professional footballer.

== Club career ==
He made his debut in the Russian Premier League in 2002 for FC Torpedo Moscow.
