= Iryna Kozhemyakina =

Ukrainian sprinter

Iryna Kozhemyakina (Ukrainian: Ірина Кожемякіна, born 16 June 1980) is a Ukrainian sprinter who specializes in the 100 metres.

In individual competition she competed at the 2003 World Indoor Championships and the 2004 World Indoor Championships without reaching the final. In the 4 x 100 metres relay she finished fifth at the 2002 European Championships. She also competed at the 2004 Olympic Games and the 2005 World Championships without reaching the final.

Her personal best times are 7.16 seconds in the 60 metres (indoor), achieved in January 2004 in Zaporizhzhia; and 11.39 seconds in the 100 metres, achieved in June 2004 in Kharkiv.
