= Muna Lee (sprinter) =

American sprinter

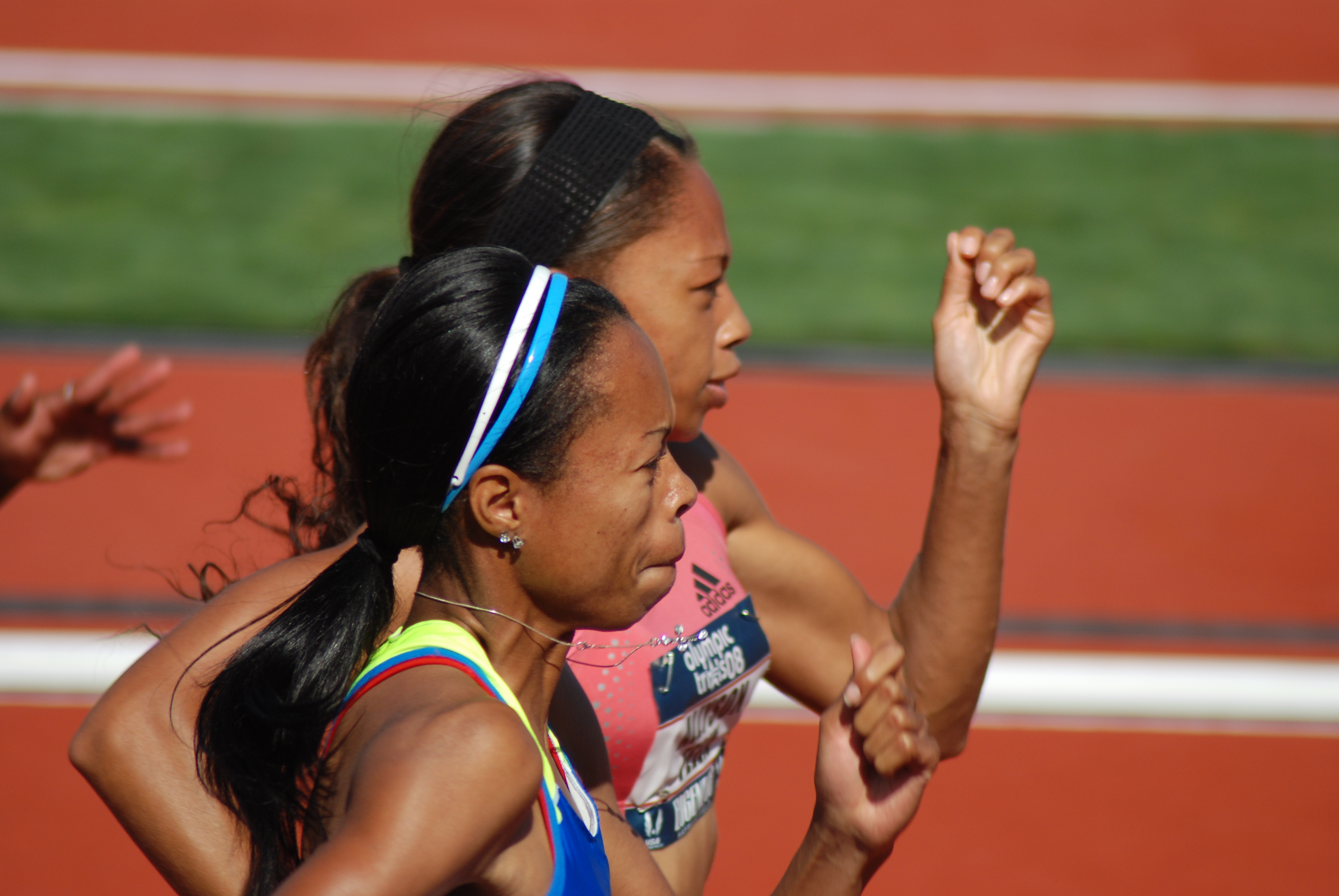
- Muna Lee (in foreground)

Personal information
- Born: October 30, 1981 (age 44) Little Rock, Arkansas, U.S.
- Height: 5 ft 8 in (1.73 m)
- Weight: 119 lb (54 kg)

Sport
- Country: United States
- Sport: Athletics
- Event(s): 4 × 100 m, 100 m, 200 m
Medal record
World Championships
Gold medal – first place	2005 Helsinki	4 × 100 m relay

Muna Lee (born October 30, 1981) is a retired American sprinter who currently serves as an Assistant Coach:Sprints/Hurdles for the UAB Blazers Track & Field program.

== High school career ==
Lee graduated from Central High School in Kansas City, Missouri where she competed in track and field and basketball from 1997-2000.

Lee won 10 individual and 3 relay Missouri Class 4A (largest class) State Championships in her high school career.

- 100-meter dash – 1997 (12.49), 1998 (12.03), 1999 (11.81), 2000 (11.54)
- 200-meter dash – 1997 (24.52), 1998 (24.80), 1999 (24.14), 2000 (23.83)
- Long Jump – 1997 (18-06.00), 2000 (19-06.00)
- 4 × 100-meter relay – 1997 (47.93), 1998 (48.16)
- 4 × 200-meter relay – 2000 (1:39.72)

Lee also led Central High School to the 2000 Missouri 4A Team championship.

Lee won both the Gatorade Missouri High School Track athlete of the year and Wayne F. Campbell Award (top high school track and field athlete in Kansas City) in 1999 and 2000.

Named the AAU’s Most Outstanding girls’ high school track and field athlete in 1999.

== College career ==
Lee ran track collegiately for the Lady Tigers of Louisiana State University from 2001-2004 where she finished her career as LSU's most decorated track and field athlete as a 7-time NCAA champion, 12-time SEC champion and 20-time All-American.

=== 2001 ===
- Earned 4 NCAA All-American honors (Outdoor 100-meter dash, Outdoor 200-meter dash, Outdoor 4 × 100-meter relay, Indoor 200-meter dash).
- Best times were 100-meter dash (11.17) and 200-meter dash (23.13).
- At the 2001 NCAA Division I Indoor Track and Field Championships at Randal Tyson Track Center, University of Arkansas, Fayetteville, Arkansas Lee finished 2nd in the 200-meter dash (23.51).
- At the 2001 NCAA Division I Outdoor Track and Field Championships at Hayward Field, University of Oregon, Eugene, Oregon, Lee finished 1st in the 4 × 100-meter relay (43.54), 2nd in the 200-meter dash (23.05), and 4th in the 100-meter dash (11.22).

=== 2002 ===
- Named USTCA Women’s Athlete of the Year and SEC Women’s Indoor Track Athlete of the Year.
- Earned 6 NCAA All-American honors (Indoor 60-meter dash, Indoor 200-meter dash, Indoor 4 × 100-meter Relay, Outdoor 100-meter dash, Outdoor 200-meter dash, Outdoor 4 × 100-meter relay).
- Best times were 100-meter dash (11.19) and 200-meter dash (22.66).
- Helped LSU to the 2002 NCAA Division I Indoor Track and Field Championships team title in the meet that was held at the Randal Tyson Track Center, University of Arkansas, Fayetteville, Arkansas where she finished 1st in the 200-meter dash (22.82), 3rd in the 60-meter dash (7.23), and 3rd in the 4 × 100-meter relay (3:35:13).
- At the 2002 NCAA Division I Outdoor Track and Field Championships held at Bernie Moore Track Stadium, Louisiana State University, Baton Rouge, Louisiana finished 4th in the 200-meter dash (23.19), 3rd in the 100-meter dash (11.44), and 2nd in the 4 × 100-meter relay (43.28).

=== 2003 ===
- Named USTCA Women’s Indoor Athlete of the Year.
- Earned 5 NCAA All-American honors (Indoor 60-meter dash, Indoor 200-meter dash, Outdoor 100-meter dash, Outdoor 200-meter dash, Outdoor 4 × 100-meter relay).
- Best times were 100-meter dash (11.04) and 200-meter dash (22.74).
- Led LSU to their second consecutive 2003 NCAA Division I Indoor Track and Field Championships that was held at Randal Tyson Track Center, University of Arkansas, Fayetteville, Arkansas where she earned 1st in the 60-meter dash (7.17), 1st in the 200-meter dash (22.61) – (second consecutive championship).
- At the 2003 NCAA Division I Indoor Track and Field Championships at Alex G. Spanos Stadium, Sacramento, California, Lee earned 2nd in the 100-meter dash (11.22), 2nd in the 200-meter dash (22.76), and 1st in the 4 × 100-meter relay (42.55).

=== 2004 ===
- Named NCAA Mideast Region Women’s Athlete of the Year.
- Earned 5 NCAA All-American honors (Indoor 60-meter dash, Indoor 200-meter dash, Outdoor 100-meter dash, Outdoor 200-meter dash, Outdoor 4 × 100-meter relay)
- Best times were 100-meter dash (11.12) and 200-meter dash (22.36).
- Led LSU to their 3rd straight NCAA Indoor Track and Field Championship that was held at the Randal Tyson Track Center, University of Arkansas, Fayetteville, Arkansas where Lee earned 1st in the 60-meter dash (7.21) – (second consecutive championship) and 5th in the 200-meter dash (22.87).
- At the NCAA Outdoor Track and Field Championships held at the Mike A. Myers Stadium, University of Texas, Austin, Texas, Lee earned 2nd in the 200-meter dash (22.55), 2nd in the 100-meter dash (11.12), and 1st in the 4 × 100-meter relay (42.61).

== USA Track & Field career ==
=== 2000 ===
- On July 25, 2000, before entering LSU, Lee competed in 2000 Olympic Trials 100-meter dash in Sacramento, California. Lee sprinted to an 11.36 time in the first round before finishing 8th in the semifinals with a time of 11.67.

=== 2001 ===
- Ranked #6 in the USA in the 200-meter dash by Track and Field News.

=== 2002 ===
- Finished 4th in the 200-meter dash at the USA Outdoor Track & Field Championships held at Cobb Track & Angell Field at Stanford University in Palo Alto, California.

=== 2003 ===
- Ranked #7 in the USA in the 100-meter dash and 5th in the 200-meter dash by Track & Field News.

=== 2004 ===
- Tied for 7th in the 200-meter dash (22.87) at the 2004 Summer Olympics held at the Athens Olympic Stadium in Athens, Greece.
- Finished 2nd in the 200-meter dash (22.36) at the USA Olympic Trials at the Alex G. Spanos Stadium in Sacramento, California.
- Ranked #7 in the World and #2 in the USA in the 200-meter dash by Track & Field News.
- Ranked #7 in the USA in the 100-meter dash by Track & Field News.

=== 2005 ===
- Finished 2nd in the 100-meter dash (11.28) and 5th in the 200-meter dash (22.46) at the USA Outdoor Track & Field Championships at the Home Depot Center in Carson, California.
- Finished 7th in the 100-meter dash (11.09) and won the 4 × 100-meter relay gold medal (41.78) at the 2005 World Track & Field Championships at Olympic Stadium in Helsinki, Finland.
- Finished 2nd in the 60-meter dash (7.11) in the USA Indoor Track & Field Championships at the Reggie Lewis Track and Athletic Center in Boston, Massachusetts.
- Ranked #6 in the USA in the 200-meter dash by Track & Field News.
- Ranked #7 in World and #3 in the USA in the 100-meter dash by Track & Field News.

=== 2006 ===
- Did not compete due to injury.

=== 2007 ===
- Finished 8th in 100-meter dash at the USA Outdoor Track & Field Championships at IU Michael A. Carroll Track & Soccer Stadium in Indianapolis, Indiana.
- Best time was 100-meter dash (11.10)

=== 2008 ===
- Finished 4th in the 200-meter dash (22.01) and 5th in the 100-meter dash semifinal (11.18) in the 2008 Olympic Games at the Beijing National Stadium in Beijing, China.
- Won the gold medal in the 100-meter dash (10.85) and 2nd in the 200-meter dash (21.99) at the Olympic Trials at Hayward Field, University of Oregon, Eugene, Oregon.
- Ranked #4 in the World and #2 in the USA in the 200-meter dash by Track & Field News.
- Ranked #7 in the World and #3 in the USA in the 100-meter dash by Track & Field News.
- Best times were 100-meter dash (10.85) and 200-meter dash (22.01)

=== 2009 ===
- Finished 4th in the 200-meter dash (22.48) and 5th in the 100-meter semifinals (11.18) at the 2009 World Track and Field Championships held at Olympiastadion in Berlin, Germany.
- Finished 2nd in the 100-meter dash (10.78) and 2nd in the 200-meter dash (22.13) at the USA Outdoor Track & Field Championships at the Home Depot Center in Carson, California.
- Best times were 100-meter dash (11.13) and 200-meter dash (22.30)

== Career highlights ==
Lee made her Olympics debut for the United States immediately following her senior season at LSU in 2004. In Athens, Greece, Lee qualified for her first career final in international competition as she took seventh place in the 200-meter dash. She also had an impressive performance at the 2004 USA Olympic Trials, moving up in the final stretch while running in lane 1 to place second and win a spot on the Olympic Team.

Lee won a gold medal as part of the women's 4 × 100-meter relay team at the 2005 World Track and Field Championships. Lee also placed 7th in the 100-meter dash at the 2005 World Track and Field Championships

At the 2008 Summer Olympics in Beijing, Lee competed in the 100-meter dash. In her first round heat she placed first in front of Anita Pistone and Guzel Khubbieva in a time of 11.44 to advance to the second round. There she improved her time to 11.08 to finish second behind Sherone Simpson to qualify for the semifinals. In the semifinals, she placed second with a time of 11.06 behind Shelly-Ann Fraser to qualify for the final, in which she placed in fifth position with a time of 11.07 seconds.

Lee earned second place at the 2009 USA Track and Field Championships (just one thousandth of a second behind in-form Carmelita Jeter) and qualified for the 2009 World Championships in Athletics.

A week before the 2009 World Championships, Lee was part of the USA 4 × 100-meter relay team that ran the fastest women's sprint relay in twelve years. Lauryn Williams, Allyson Felix, Lee and Jeter finished with a time of 41.58 seconds, bringing them to eighth on the all-time list.

At the 2009 World Championships, Lee finished 5th in the Semifinals but failed to advance to the finals in the 100-meter dash. Lee finished 4th in the final in 200-meter dash.

== Personal bests ==
- 100 metres – 10.85 (2008) (USA Track and Field Championships) Position = 1st
- 100 metres – wind aided 10.78 (2009) (USA Track and Field Championships) Position = 2nd
- 200 metres – 22.01 (2008) (Olympic Finals)Position = 4th
- 200 metres – wind aided 21.91 (2009) (Guadeloupe) Position = 1st
