= Larisa Kruglova =

Russian sprinter

Medal record

Representing Russia

Women's athletics

Olympic Games
Silver medal – second place	2004 Athens	4×100 m relay

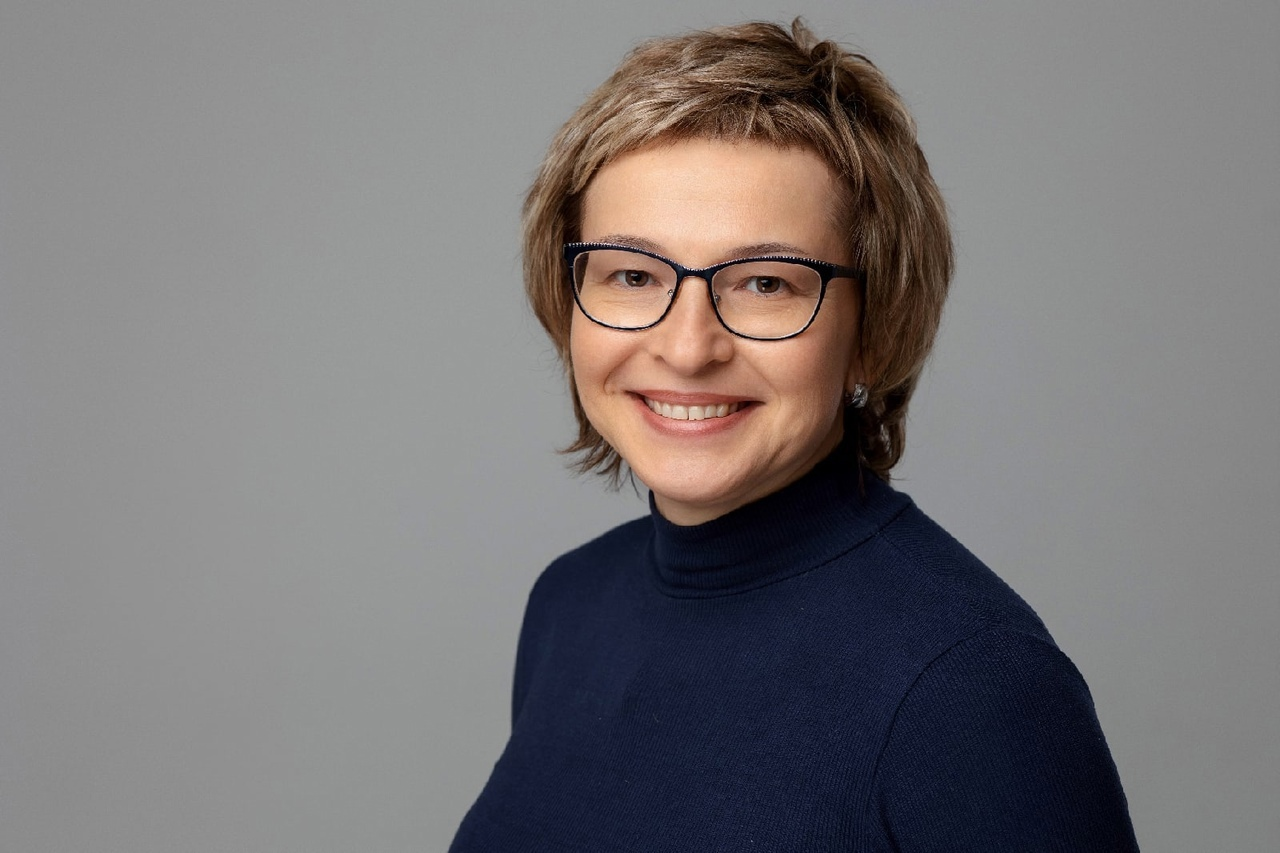

Larisa Nikolayevna Kruglova (Russian: Лариса Николаевна Круглова; born 27 October 1972 in Murmansk) is a Russian sprinter who mainly competes in the 100 metres.

Her greatest success has come in relay races, where she has Olympic silver medal to her name.

== Achievements ==
Year	Competition	Venue	Position	Notes
2002	European Indoor Championships	Vienna, Austria	6th	60 m
	European Championships	Munich, Germany	3rd	4 × 100 m relay
2003	World Championships	Paris, France	3rd	4 × 100 m relay
2004	Summer Olympics	Athens, Greece	2nd	4 × 100 m relay
2005	European Indoor Championships	Madrid, Spain	6th	60 m
2006	World Indoor Championships	Moscow, Russia	7th	60 m

=== Personal bests ===
- 100 metres - 11.20 s (2006)
- 200 metres - 22.84 s (2004)
