= Vladislav Kozhemyakin (footballer, born 2001) =

Russian footballer

Personal information
- Full name: Vladislav Aleksandrovich Kozhemyakin
- Date of birth: 25 July 2001 (age 25)
- Height: 1.78 m (5 ft 10 in)
- Position: Defender

Senior career*
| Years | Team | Apps | (Gls) |
| 2018–2021 | FC Yenisey Krasnoyarsk | 1 | (0) |
| 2021–2022 | FC Yenisey-2 Krasnoyarsk | 7 | (0) |
- * Club domestic league appearances and goals as of 5 June 2022

Vladislav Aleksandrovich Kozhemyakin (Russian: Владислав Александрович Кожемякин; born 25 July 2001) is a Russian football player.

== Club career ==
He made his debut in the Russian Football National League for FC Yenisey Krasnoyarsk on 27 September 2020 in a game against FC Krasnodar-2.
