= Torri Edwards =

American sprinter (born 1977)

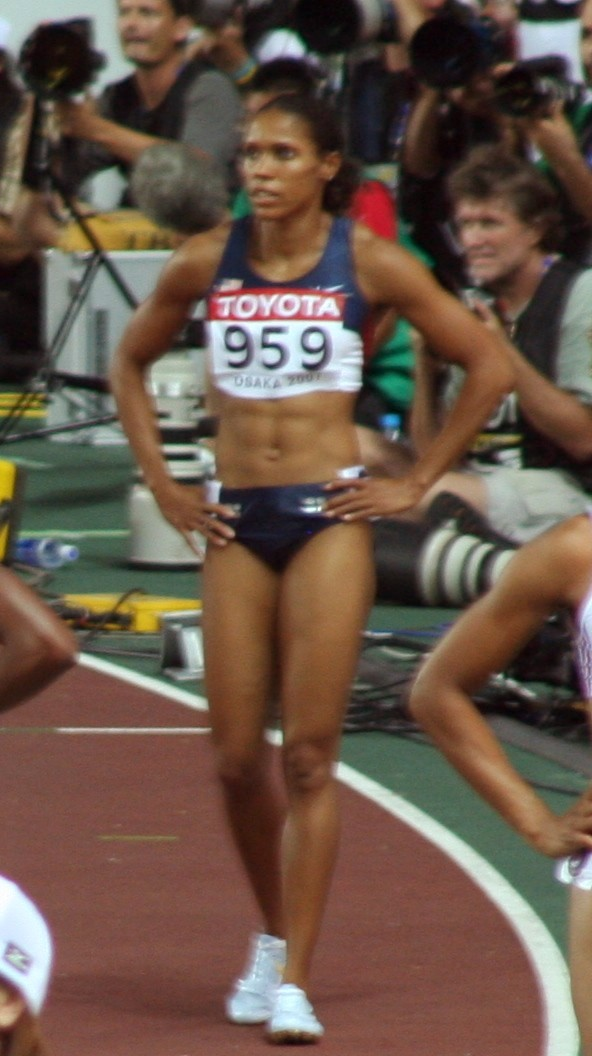

Personal information
- Nationality: American
- Born: January 31, 1977 (age 49) Fontana, California
- Height: 5 ft 4 in (1.63 m)
- Weight: 127 lb (58 kg)

Sport
- Sport: Running
- Events: 100 meters, 200 meters,

Achievements and titles
- Personal best: 100 m: 10.78 s 200 m: 22.18 s
Medal record
Women's athletics
Representing the United States
Olympic Games
Bronze medal – third place	2000 Sydney	4×100 m relay
World Championships
Gold medal – first place	2003 Paris	100 m
Gold medal – first place	2007 Osaka	4 × 100 m relay
Silver medal – second place	2003 Paris	200 m
Silver medal – second place	2003 Paris	4×100 m relay
World Indoor Championships
Silver medal – second place	2003 Birmingham	60 m
World Athletics Final
Bronze medal – third place	2003 Monaco	100 m
Bronze medal – third place	2003 Monaco	200 m
Summer Universiade
Gold medal – first place	1999 Palma de Mallorca	4x100 m relay

Torri Edwards (born January 31, 1977) is an American sprinter. She competes in 100 and 200 meters, winning an Olympic medal in 4 × 100-meter relay in 2000. In 2003, she won six medals in major international competitions, including one World Championship gold. Edwards competed in the 100 m at the 2008 Olympic Games.

== Early career ==
Edwards states that she began sprinting when she joined her school team in junior high . Edwards was an average sprinter when she attended Pomona High School, with her best state meet finish ever coming her senior year when she was fourth in the 200 m. Edwards would then attend the University of Southern California.

That track season, she won the Pac-10 titles in both the 100 m and 200 m for USC. She states:

Not until I got to college did I realize that I could be good,...Winning the Pac-10 titles gave me a big boost in confidence, and I found myself setting higher and higher goals.

== Doping ban ==
She was banned for two years effective from July 18, 2004, missing the 2004 Summer Olympics. In August 2004, Edwards appealed the ban, and an arbitration panel acknowledged that Edwards "conducted herself with honesty, integrity and character ... she has not sought to gain any improper advantage or to 'cheat' in any way." In November 2005, her two-year ban was shortened to 15 months when the World Anti-Doping Agency downgraded nikethamide infractions to maximum one-year suspensions. The drug had come from pills she had taken at a meet in Martinique to combat a minor illness. Though arbitrators decided Edwards had taken the drug inadvertently, saying in their ruling that she had conducted herself with "honesty, integrity and character," they did not overturn the suspension, because the glucose tablets given to her by her doctor contained a warning for athletes advising that the pills could cause a positive doping test. Therefore, Edwards did not take performance enhancement drugs to improve her performance.

However, since Edwards was a teammate of Marion Jones in the 2000 Olympic 4 × 100 meters relay, she was stripped of her medal following Jones's admission to using steroids during the games, though she and 6 other members of the 2000 team would successfully appeal this decision in July 2010.

== Personal bests ==
- 100 meters - 10.78 (2008)
- 200 meters - 22.28 (2003

== 2008 Olympics ==
At the 2008 Olympic finals for the women's 100 meters, Edwards stated that she thought she had false started and apparently hesitated, believing that the officials were going to call a false start.

Edwards eventually finished eighth place with a time of 11.20, an under-par performance for the American sprinter, who has a best time of 10.78. Edwards states:

I thought I moved before the gun,...I kind of hesitated because I expected to hear a second gun. It threw me off a lot. It's pretty tough.

However, Edwards actually had a reaction time of 0.179 seconds, which was not the fastest or the slowest of the eight runners. It is possible, therefore, that Edwards had not applied enough pressure on the blocks to trigger a false start warning, however she twitched her upper body, but possibly left her feet solid."

Another disappointment came in the 4 × 100 m relay when the American team dropped the baton in the semi-final due to a misunderstanding between Edwards, on the top bend, and Lauryn Williams on the anchor leg. Williams picked up the baton to finish the race in last place, but the USA was disqualified because she had had to run out of her lane in order to retrieve the baton.

== International competitions ==
Year	Competition	Venue	Position	Event	Notes
2000	Summer Olympics	Sydney, Australia	3rd	4 × 100 m relay	DQ - doping by Marion Jones
2003	World Indoor Championships	Birmingham, United Kingdom	2nd	60 m	
2003	World Championships	Paris, France	1st	100 m	10.93 PB
2003	World Championships	Paris, France	2nd	200 m	
2003	World Championships	Paris, France	2nd	4 × 100 m relay	
2003	World Athletics Final	Monte Carlo, Monaco	3rd	100 m	
2003	World Athletics Final	Monte Carlo, Monaco	3rd	200 m	
2008	Olympic Games	Beijing, China	8th	100 m	

== Coaching career ==
Torri Edwards was a sprint track coach at North Carolina State University from 2017 - 2022.

Torri Edwards was named head track coach at Kentucky State University from August 2015 - 2020.

She worked seasons with the UK Kentucky Wildcats track and field programs from 2013 - 2015.

Coach Edwards served as an assistant coach in the Riverside Community College track and field program. While serving as an assistant at RCC, Edwards helped the men's track and field team capture conference and state titles in 2012 and 2013.

Edwards most recently worked as a volunteer assistant at Cal Poly Pomona the past two years (2012–2014). She helped Angela Garcia reach the NCAA Division II National Championships in just her first collegiate season of track and field. Garcia also earned All-West Region honors for her work in the 100- and 200-meter events. At the 2013 California Collegiate Athletic Association (CCAA) Track & Field Championships, CPP placed second on the men's side for the best finish since 2006 while the women finished third to mark the first top-three result in more than a decade. The two teams combined for six individual conference champions while 25 Broncos received All-CCAA honors.

== See also ==
- List of doping cases in athletics
