= Mariya Bolikova =

Russian sprinter (born 1977)

Mariya Bolikova (born 23 May 1977 in Elista, Russian: Мария Боликова) is a Russian sprinter who specializes in the 100 metres. She finished fifth in the 60 metres at the 2005 European Athletics Indoor Championships in Madrid and fourth at the 2006 IAAF World Indoor Championships in Moscow.

Her personal best time over 100 m is 11.20 seconds, achieved in July 2005 in Tula.
