= Me'Lisa Barber =

American sprinter

Personal information
- Born: October 4, 1980 (age 46) Livingston, New Jersey, U.S.
Medal record
Women's athletics
World Championships
Gold medal – first place	2003 Paris	4 × 400 m relay
Gold medal – first place	2005 Helsinki	4 × 100 m relay
World Indoor Championships
Gold medal – first place	2006 Moscow	60 metres

Me'Lisa Barber is an American sprinter. After graduating from University of South Carolina, she was the 2005 USA Outdoor Champion in the 100 metres and the 2006 World Indoor Champion in the 60 metres. She was also one of the 2003 World Champions in the 4 × 400 metres relay and one of the 2005 World Champions in the 4 × 100 metres relay.

== Life and career ==
Barber grew up in Montclair, New Jersey. Her 4 × 100 metre and 4 × 400 metre high school relays with her twin sister, Miki, at Montclair High School were both honored as All-American.

Throughout her collegiate career, Barber won four SEC titles. In 2001, while attending the University of South Carolina, she won a gold medal at the World University Games in the 4 × 400 metres relay as part of Team USA. She was made co-captain of the South Carolina Gamecocks women's track and field team in 2002, when the team won at the NCAA Outdoor Championships. During the championships, she ran in place of her sister in the 400 metres due to her sister's injury. Barber graduated from the University of South Carolina in 2002 with a degree in business and retail management. She won a gold medal in the 4 × 400 meters relay as part of Team USA at the 2003 World Championships in Paris, and competed in the 4 × 100 metres relay with Team USA at the 2005 World Championships in Helsinki. During the 2005 USA Outdoor Track and Field Championships, she won gold in the 100 metres and placed fourth in the 200 metres.

At the 2006 IAAF World Indoor Championships, she won a gold medal in the 60 metres, running the fastest time of that season at 7.01 seconds. Barber left coach Trevor Graham in 2006 following his involvement in the BALCO scandal. In 2009, Barber ruptured her Achilles tendon after a drunk driver rear-ended her car in Atlanta, Georgia, and stopped competing for several years.

Barber runs a line of jewelry called The Honey Collection, a juice company, and a personal training company called Body Code. She and her sister also began doing motivational speaking tours in schools in 2018.

== Public image ==
NJ.com selected Barber as one of Montclair High School's four best athletes of all time.
