= 2005 World Championships in Athletics =

Athletics competition in Helsinki, Finland

- Host city: Helsinki, Finland
- Nations: 196
- Athletes: 1,891
- Events: 47
- Dates: 6–14 August 2005
- Opened by: President Tarja Halonen
- Closed by: IAAF President Lamine Diack
- Main venue: Helsinki Olympic Stadium

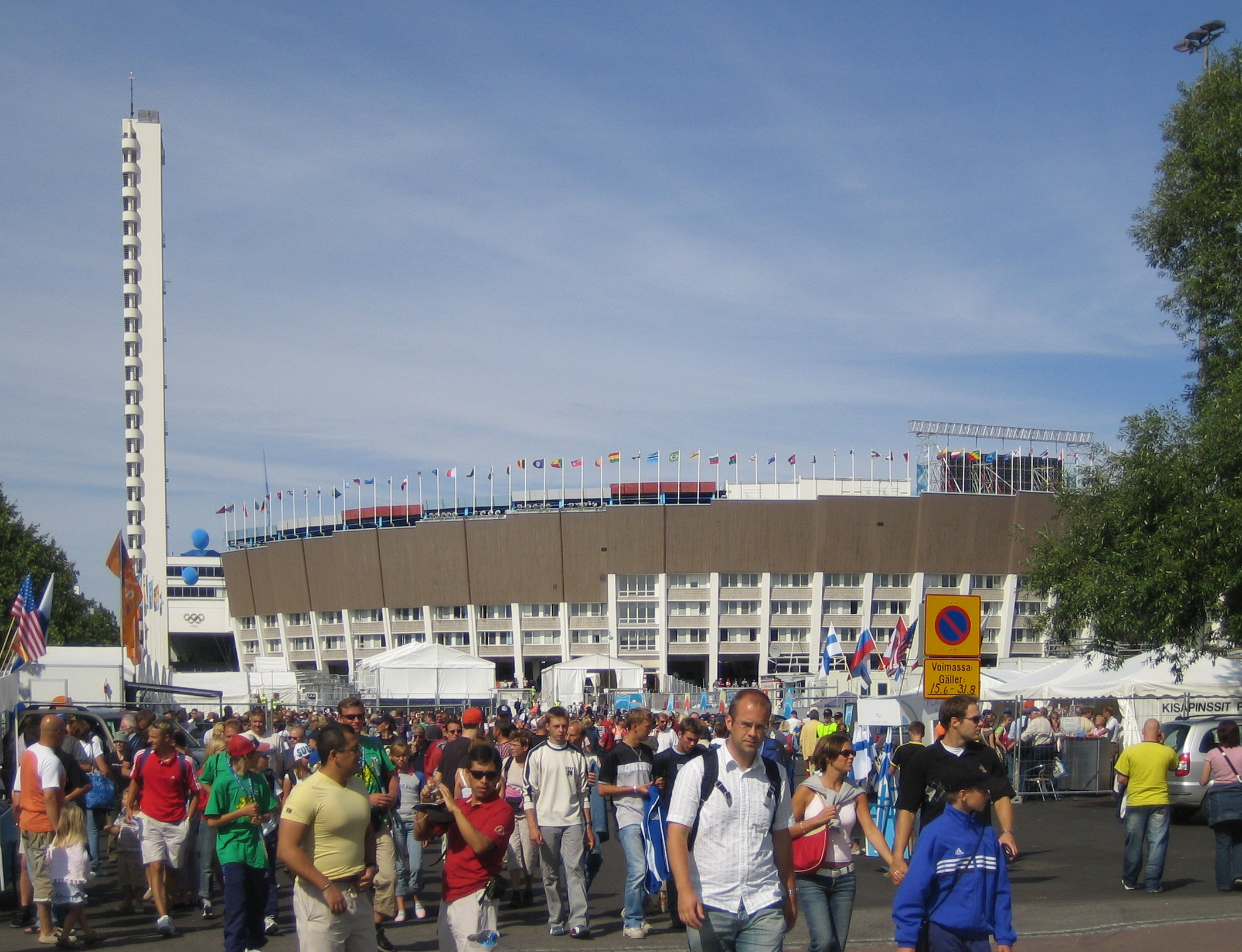
Helsinki Olympic Stadium at the opening day of the 2005 World Championships in Athletics.

The 10th World Championships in Athletics (Finnish: Yleisurheilun maailmanmestaruuskilpailut 2005, Swedish: Världsmästerskapen i friidrott 2005), under the auspices of the International Association of Athletics Federations (IAAF), were held in the Olympic Stadium, Helsinki, Finland (6 August 2005 – 14 August 2005), the site of the first IAAF World Championships in 1983. One theme of the 2005 championships was paralympic events, some of which were included as exhibition events. Much of the event was played in extremely heavy rainfall.

== Background ==
=== Bidding ===
The original winning bid for the competition was for London but the cost to build the required stadium at Picketts Lock and host the event was deemed too expensive by the government. UK Athletics suggested to move the host city to Sheffield (using Don Valley Stadium), but the IAAF stated that having London as the host city was central to their winning the bid. The championships bidding process was reopened as a result. The United Kingdom's withdrawal as host was the first case for a major sporting event in a developed country since Denver's withdrawal as host of the 1976 Winter Olympics.

Helsinki was considered by many to be the outsider in the race to host the games with rival bids being presented by Berlin in Germany; Brussels in Belgium, Budapest in Hungary, Moscow in Russia and Rome in Italy.

=== Opening ceremony ===
Apocalyptica and Nightwish performed at the opening ceremony of the event over a heavy rainfall. Geir Rönning, Finland's Eurovision Song Contest 2005 entrant, sang "Victory" the official song of the 2005 IAAF World Championships.

=== Events ===
With the addition of the women's 3000 metres steeplechase to the schedule, that year's program of events was closer to parity for women and men. With the exception of the 50 km walk the women competed in practically the same events as the men. Two differences remaining from before, though, were the short hurdles race (100 metres for women vs. 110 metres for men), and the multi-event competition (heptathlon for women vs. decathlon for men).

Since the first World Championships in Helsinki 1983, seven new events have been added for women:

- 10,000 metres, introduced in 1987
- 5000 metres, replaced 3000 metres in 1995
- triple jump, introduced in 1993
- 20 km walk introduced in 1999, replaced 10 km walk that first appeared in 1987
- pole vault, introduced in 1999
- hammer throw, introduced in 1999
- 3000 metres steeplechase, introduced in 2005

== Drug testing ==
The IAAF conducted their largest ever anti-doping program at an athletics event for the championships, with 705 athletes subjected to a total 884 of tests. There were two athletes who failed drugs tests: Indian discus thrower Neelam Jaswant Singh tested positive for the stimulant pemoline, and Vladyslav Piskunov, a Ukrainian hammer thrower, tested positive for the steroid drostanolone. Singh received a two-year ineligibility ban, while Piskunov received a life ban from athletics as this was his second offence.

In March 2013, the IAAF announced that re-testing of samples taken during these championships revealed that five medal winners had proved positive for banned substances. The athletes involved were Belarusian Nadzeya Ostapchuk (shot put gold), Belarusian Ivan Tsikhan (hammer throw gold), Russian Olga Kuzenkova (hammer throw gold), Russian Tatyana Kotova (long jump silver) and Belarus's Vadim Devyatovskiy (men's hammer silver). Belarusian Andrei Mikhnevich (shot put 6th) had also tested positive and was disqualified.

== Men's results ==
=== Track ===
2001 | 2003 | 2005 | 2007 | 2009

Event	Gold		Silver		Bronze	
100 m	Justin Gatlin; United States	9.88; SB	Michael Frater; Jamaica	10.05	Kim Collins; Saint Kitts and Nevis	10.05
200 m	Justin Gatlin; United States	20.04	Wallace Spearmon; United States	20.20	John Capel; United States	20.31; SB
200 m	Justin Gatlin wins the 200 metres, becoming the second athlete to win a sprint double in a single World Championships (Maurice Greene was the first, in 1999). Tyson Gay finishes fourth (20.34) to complete an American 1-2-3-4, the first time any nation has achieved this in a world championship athletics event. Usain Bolt of Jamaica pulls a muscle at about 150 m into the race and finishes last.					
400 m	Jeremy Wariner; United States	43.93; WL	Andrew Rock; United States	44.35; PB	Tyler Christopher; Canada	44.44; NR
400 m	Olympic champion Wariner wins easily, with his first time under 44 seconds.					
800 m	Rashid Ramzi; Bahrain	1:44.24; PB	Yuriy Borzakovskiy; Russia	1:44.51	William Yiampoy; Kenya	1:44.55
800 m	Yuriy Borzakovskiy starts his trademark sprint finish at 200m to go, but was boxed in behind Mehdi Baala of France which allowed Rashid Ramzi to win his second gold in the championships.					
1500 m	Rashid Ramzi; Bahrain	3:37.88	Adil Kaouch; Morocco	3:38.00; SB	Rui Silva; Portugal	3:38.02
1500 m	This was the first 800–1500 m double in open global championship since New Zealand's Peter Snell achieved it at the Tokyo Olympics in 1964. Ramzi, near the front at the bell, kicked with 300 metres to go and made another decisive move with 200 to go.					
5000 m	Benjamin Limo; Kenya	13:32.55	Sileshi Sihine; Ethiopia	13:32.81	Craig Mottram; Australia	13:32.96
5000 m	A slow pace race, ending in a sprint for the line in the last lap. Defending champion Eliud Kipchoge of Kenya just misses out of the bronze. (13:33.04)					
10,000 m	Kenenisa Bekele; Ethiopia	27:08.33	Sileshi Sihine; Ethiopia	27:08.87	Moses Mosop; Kenya	27:08.96; PB
10,000 m	The pace was slow for the first sixteen laps until Bekele surged to the front with a 62-second seventeenth lap, whittling the pack down to nine men. The pace would dawdle again, the ninth kilometre was the slowest since the first in 2:48, though the last one was run in a furious 2:29. The pack of nine was still together at the bell, although somewhat strung out. Bekele ran the last lap in 54 seconds, holding off the challenge of Mosop thanks to help from Sihine and Dinkessa, who boxed him on the penultimate straight. Bekele would then hold off a charge from Sihine, while Dinkessa faded to seventh due to his exertions.					
Marathon	Jaouad Gharib; Morocco	2:10:10	Christopher Isengwe; Tanzania	2:10:21; PB	Tsuyoshi Ogata; Japan	2:11:16; SB
Marathon	Gharib attacked just before 30 km mark, getting Italian Olympic champion Stefano Baldini with him. Baldini had cramps few kilometres later and he retired after 35 kilometres.					
110 m hurdles	Ladji Doucouré; France	13.07	Liu Xiang; China	13.08	Allen Johnson; United States	13.10
110 m hurdles	In a very tight race, Frenchman Ladji Doucouré wins the 110 m hurdles, battling with Allen Johnson in the middle lanes and just crossing the line ahead of the fast finishing Liu Xiang.					
400 m hurdles	Bershawn Jackson; United States	47.30; PB	James Carter; United States	47.43; PB	Dai Tamesue; Japan	48.10; SB
400 m hurdles	In driving rain, Dai Tamesue starts fast to take the early lead before being overtaken on the final bend. Bershawn Jackson shows better form in the final straight to stretch away from James Carter. Tamesue dives over the line for a bronze to edge out Kerron Clement of the USA who jogs over the line.					
3000 m s'chase	Saif Saaeed Shaheen; Qatar	8:13.31	Ezekiel Kemboi; Kenya	8:14.95	Brimin Kipruto; Kenya	8:15.30
3000 m s'chase	A comfortable race for Said Saaeed Shaheen as Ezekiel Kemboi fails to mount a serious challenge. Brimin Kipruto finishes fast to edge Brahim Boulami into fourth place by two hundredths of a second.					
20 km walk	Jefferson Pérez; Ecuador	1:18:35; SB	Paquillo Fernández; Spain	1:19:36	Juan Manuel Molina; Spain	1:19:44; PB
50 km walk	Sergey Kirdyapkin; Russia	3:38:08; PB	Aleksey Voyevodin; Russia	3:41:25	Alex Schwazer; Italy	3:41:54; NR
50 km walk	Sergey Kirdyapkin, the former junior world champion led from early on and secures the global title in a personal best time. At around the 20 km mark he was caught by Aleksey Voyevodin, but by 40 km Kirdyapkin had shaken off his fellow Russian, who went on to earn silver in 3:41.25. Italian Alex Schwazer powers through late on to claim the bronze in a national record 3:41.54. There were fourteen disqualifications, and seven athletes did not finish.					
4 × 100 m	France; Ladji Doucouré; Ronald Pognon; Eddy De Lépine; Lueyi Dovy; Oudéré Kankarafou*	38.08; WL	Trinidad and Tobago; Kevon Pierre; Marc Burns; Jacey Harper; Darrel Brown	38.10; NR	Great Britain; Jason Gardener; Marlon Devonish; Christian Malcolm; Mark Lewis-Francis	38.27; SB
4 × 100 m	The Great Britain team just beat Jamaica (38.28, SB) and Australia (38.32, SB) to bronze medal position. The United States' team does not participate, having bungled their first relay stick handoff in their qualification heat the previous day.					
4 × 400 m	United States; Andrew Rock; Derrick Brew; Darold Williamson; Jeremy Wariner; Miles Smith*; LaShawn Merritt*	2:56.91; WL	Bahamas; Nathaniel McKinney; Avard Moncur; Andrae Williams; Chris Brown; Troy McIntosh*	2:57.32; NR	Jamaica; Sanjay Ayre; Brandon Simpson; Lansford Spence; Davian Clarke; Michael Blackwood*	2:58.07; SB
WR world record | AR area record | CR championship record | GR games record | NR national record | OR Olympic record | PB personal best | SB season best | WL world leading (in a given season)

Note: * Indicates athletes who ran in preliminary rounds.

=== Field ===
2001 | 2003 | 2005 | 2007 | 2009

Event	Gold		Silver		Bronze	
High jump	Yuriy Krymarenko; Ukraine	2.32	Víctor Moya; Cuba	2.29		
High jump	Yuriy Krymarenko; Ukraine	2.32	Yaroslav Rybakov; Russia	2.29		
High jump	Surprise winner. Eight athletes had cleared 2.29 m but on 2.32 m, 23 straight attempts were failed, until Krymarenko cleared with his last attempt.					
Pole vault	Rens Blom; Netherlands	5.80; SB	Brad Walker; United States	5.75	Pavel Gerasimov; Russia	5.65; SB
Pole vault	In rain and heavy wind, Rens Blom wins the first Dutch gold medal at a World Championship.					
Long jump	Dwight Phillips; United States	8.60; WL	Ignisious Gaisah; Ghana	8.34; NR	Tommi Evilä; Finland	8.25
Long jump	Dwight Phillips takes the gold comfortably with his first jump, but the contest for the other medals is fierce. Tommi Evilä wins the host nation Finland's only medal of the championships, just beating Salim Sdiri of France and Joan Lino Martínez of Spain to third place.					
Triple jump	Walter Davis; United States	17.57; SB	Yoandri Betanzos; Cuba	17.42; SB	Marian Oprea; Romania	17.40
Triple jump	Leevan Sands, of the Bahamas, is in bronze medal position for a long time, but is pipped to fourth by Marian Oprea's last jump.					
Shot put	Adam Nelson; United States	21.73; SB	Rutger Smith; Netherlands	21.29	Ralf Bartels; Germany	20.99
Shot put	After two Olympic and two World Championship silver medals, Adam Nelson finally took his first gold at the global level. Nelson would retroactively gain the 2004 Olympic gold after drug sample retesting disqualified the original gold medalist, but without a podium ceremony.					
Discus throw	Virgilijus Alekna; Lithuania	70.17; CR	Gerd Kanter; Estonia	68.57	Michael Möllenbeck; Germany	65.95
Discus throw	Defending champion Virgilijus Alekna takes home the gold with the competition's only longer-than-70 m throw. Fellow Balt Gerd Kanter is the runner-up.					
Hammer throw	Vadim Devyatovskiy; Belarus	82.60	Szymon Ziółkowski; Poland	79.35; SB	Markus Esser; Germany	79.16
Hammer throw	Ivan Tsikhan (1st) was later disqualified for doping.					
Javelin throw	Andrus Värnik; Estonia	87.17	Andreas Thorkildsen; Norway	86.18	Sergey Makarov; Russia	83.54
Javelin throw	Surprise winner Andrus Värnik takes Estonia's first gold medal at the World Championships, beating the reigning Olympic champion Andreas Thorkildsen by 99 cm. Finland's young star Tero Pitkämäki throws below his usual level in the heavy rain, and finishes fourth (81.27 m).					
Decathlon	Bryan Clay; United States	8732; WL	Roman Šebrle; Czech Republic	8521	Attila Zsivoczky; Hungary	8385
Decathlon	Aleksandr Pogorelov just loses the bronze after the 1500 m.					
WR world record | AR area record | CR championship record | GR games record | NR national record | OR Olympic record | PB personal best | SB season best | WL world leading (in a given season)

== Women's results ==
=== Track ===
2001 | 2003 | 2005 | 2007 | 2009

Event	Gold		Silver		Bronze	
100 m	Lauryn Williams; United States	10.93	Veronica Campbell; Jamaica	10.95; SB	Christine Arron; France	10.98
100 m	Lauryn Williams obtains a surprise victory beating the favourite Christine Arron that finished only third behind also Veronica Campbell.					
200 m	Allyson Felix; United States	22.16	Rachelle Boone-Smith; United States	22.31	Christine Arron; France	22.31; SB
200 m	Veronica Campbell ran a terrible bend (she runs out of her lane) and finished fourth.					
400 m	Tonique Williams-Darling; Bahamas	49.55; SB	Sanya Richards; United States	49.74	Ana Guevara; Mexico	49.81
400 m	In a high quality final (despite heavy rainfall), Tonique Williams-Darling overtakes Sanya Richards just before the finish.					
800 m	Zulia Calatayud; Cuba	1:58.82	Hasna Benhassi; Morocco	1:59.42	Tatyana Andrianova; Russia	1:59.60
800 m	Former world champion Maria de Lurdes Mutola comes fourth.					
1500 m	Tatyana Tomashova; Russia	4:00.35; SB	Olga Yegorova; Russia	4:01.46	Bouchra Ghezielle; France	4:02.45
1500 m	Yuliya Chizhenko finished second in 4:00.93, but she was disqualified for obstructing Maryam Yusuf Jamal of Bahrain, therefore Olga Yegorova gets the silver and Bouchra Ghezielle of France gets the bronze.					
5000 m	Tirunesh Dibaba; Ethiopia	14:38.59; CR	Meseret Defar; Ethiopia	14:39.54	Ejegayehu Dibaba; Ethiopia	14:42.47
5000 m	Tirunesh Dibaba becomes the first woman to win the 5000 and 10,000 m at the same championships. Also, as in the 10,000 m race, the winner's elder sister Ejegayehu Dibaba takes the bronze, stepping onto an entirely Ethiopian podium. Ethiopia claim the first four places, the second time that a country has ever achieved this (after the USA Men's 200m above).					
10,000 m	Tirunesh Dibaba; Ethiopia	30:24.02	Berhane Adere; Ethiopia	30:25.41; SB	Ejegayehu Dibaba; Ethiopia	30:26.00
10,000 m	Fascinating race with Paula Radcliffe, using the race as preparation for the marathon, setting most of the pace before her lack of competitive 10k races this season sees her drop back with three laps to go. The three medal winners shows amazing acceleration with one lap to go, Berhane Adere kicking first but quickly covered by Tirunesh Dibaba with elder sister Ejegayehu Dibaba unable to match their pace. Tirunesh kicks again and goes past Adere with 250 metres to go to claim the gold. Reigning Olympic champion Xing Huina cannot cope with the acceleration and finishes fourth.					
Marathon	Paula Radcliffe; Great Britain	2:20:57; CR	Catherine Ndereba; Kenya	2:22:01; SB	Constantina Tomescu; Romania	2:23:19
Marathon	Paula Radcliffe sets the pace of the race, leading all the way from start to finish. Constantina Tomescu is able to keep up with Radcliffe the longest, but begins to fall behind after the 25 km mark and at the end finds herself overtaken by the defending champion Catherine Ndereba. Derartu Tulu finishes fourth.					
100 m hurdles	Michelle Perry; United States	12.66	Delloreen Ennis-London; Jamaica	12.76	Brigitte Foster-Hylton; Jamaica	12.76
100 m hurdles	A dramatic race, as Olympic champion Joanna Hayes leads but loses her balance after the second last hurdle, runs into the last hurdle, and comes last.					
400 m hurdles	Yuliya Pechonkina; Russia	52.90; WL	Lashinda Demus; United States	53.27; PB	Sandra Glover; United States	53.32; PB
400 m hurdles	Yuliya Pechonkina wins the gold. The USA appeals after Pechonkina appears to have not jumped over the first hurdle correctly, but the appeal fails.					
3000 m s'chase	Dorcus Inzikuru; Uganda	9:18.24; CR	Yekaterina Volkova; Russia	9:20.49; PB	Jeruto Kiptum; Kenya	9:26.95; NR
3000 m s'chase	Dorcus Inzikuru wins Uganda's first ever gold medal in the World Championships					
20 km walk	Olimpiada Ivanova; Russia	1:25:41; WL	Ryta Turava; Belarus	1:27:05; NR	Susana Feitor; Portugal	1:28:44; SB
4 × 100 m relay	United States; Angela Daigle; Muna Lee; Me'Lisa Barber; Lauryn Williams	41.78; WL	Jamaica; Daniele Browning; Sherone Simpson; Aleen Bailey; Veronica Campbell; Beverly McDonald*	41.99; SB	Belarus; Yulia Nestsiarenka; Natalya Sologub; Alena Nevmerzhitskaya; Oksana Dragun	42.56; NR
4 × 400 m relay	Russia; Yuliya Pechonkina; Olesya Krasnomovets; Natalya Antyukh; Svetlana Pospelova; Tatyana Firova*; Olesya Zykina*	3:20.95	Jamaica; Shericka Williams; Novlene Williams; Ronetta Smith; Lorraine Fenton	3:23.29; SB	Great Britain; Lee McConnell; Donna Fraser; Nicola Sanders; Christine Ohuruogu	3:24.44; SB
WR world record | AR area record | CR championship record | GR games record | NR national record | OR Olympic record | PB personal best | SB season best | WL world leading (in a given season)

Note: * Indicates athletes who ran in preliminary rounds.

=== Field ===
2001 | 2003 | 2005 | 2007 | 2009

Event	Gold		Silver		Bronze	
High jump	Kajsa Bergqvist; Sweden	2.02; WL	Chaunte Howard; United States	2.00; PB	Emma Green; Sweden	1.96; PB
High jump	The weather conditions during final were not the best, and may well have hampered performances. Kajsa Bergqvist showed what willpower and dedication can achieve, as she claimed her first world championship gold medal after clearing 2.02m with only one foul in her entire series of jumps despite being having only recovered from injury within the past few months. Newcomer Chaunte Howard was the only real threat to Kajsa, and a big surprise, seemingly to herself as much as to the spectators. Her respectable jump technique and result make her someone to keep an eye on in the future. Swede Emma Green continued her quick rise to the elite level, taking the bronze in her first ever major championships.					
Pole vault	Yelena Isinbayeva; Russia	5.01; WR	Monika Pyrek; Poland	4.60	Pavla Hamáčková; Czech Republic	4.50
Pole vault	Already having secured her victory by doing the competition's only 4.70 m jump, Yelena Isinbayeva breaks her own world record from three weeks ago by 1 centimetre.					
Long jump	Tianna Madison; United States	6.89; PB	Eunice Barber; France	6.76	Yargelis Savigne; Cuba	6.69
Long jump	An unexpected win for Tianna Madison, as Tatyana Kotova finishes second for the third World Outdoor Championships in a row. In 2013 Kotova's drug test sample from this event had been retested and found to be positive.					
Triple jump	Trecia Smith; Jamaica	15.11; WL	Yargelis Savigne; Cuba	14.82; PB	Anna Pyatykh; Russia	14.78
Triple jump	Trecia Smith makes the three longest jumps in the final to take the gold. Yargelis Savigne takes silver in her first international competition with Anna Pyatykh third. Pre-event favourite Tatyana Lebedeva from Russia, who would go on to be the sole winner of the 2005 Golden League jackpot, did not take part because of injury.					
Shot put	Olga Ryabinkina; Russia	19.64	Valerie Vili; New Zealand	19.62	Nadine Kleinert; Germany	19.07
Shot put	Twenty-year-old Valerie Vili earns a surprise bronze, as Nadzeya Ostapchuk wins her first Outdoor World Championships Gold. In March 2013 the IAAF reported that Ostapchuk's drug test sample from this event had been retested and found to be positive. Her result was subsequently annulled.					
Discus throw	Franka Dietzsch; Germany	66.56; SB	Natalya Sadova; Russia	64.33	Věra Pospíšilová-Cechlová; Czech Republic	63.19
Discus throw	Dominating the competition in her second podium performance over the course of eight World Championships, Franka Dietzsch gets the gold medal, as she did in Sevilla six years ago.					
Hammer throw	Yipsi Moreno; Cuba	73.08	Tatyana Lysenko; Russia	72.46	Manuela Montebrun; France	71.41
Hammer throw	The original winner, Olga Kuzenkova of Russia was stripped of the gold medal after failing drugs tests revision in 2013. The rest of the competitors were elevated by one position accordingly.					
Javelin throw	Osleidys Menéndez; Cuba	71.70; WR	Christina Obergföll; Germany	70.03; AR	Steffi Nerius; Germany	65.96
Javelin throw	A high-quality contest where Olympic champion Osleidys Menéndez sets a new world record whereas Christina Obergföll sets a new European record.					
Heptathlon	Carolina Klüft; Sweden	6887; SB	Eunice Barber; France	6824	Margaret Simpson; Ghana	6375
Heptathlon	(13.19 - 1.82 - 15.02 - 23.70 - 6.87 - 47.20 - 2:08.89)		(12.94 - 1.91 - 13.20 - 24.01 - 6.75 - 48.24 - 2:11.94)		(13.55 - 1.79 - 13.33 - 24.94 - 6.09 - 56.36 - 2:17.02)	
Heptathlon	A close heptathlon saw Eunice Barber take the early lead after winning the 100 mH and HJ. A foot injury hampered Carolina Klüft who jumped 12 cm below her season best in the HJ, however, she struck back in the SP with a PB. After the first day, Barber had only a 2-point lead over Klüft. Day two started with the LJ, where Klüft was expected to jump poorly due to her injury. If she had problems she hid them well, winning with an SB. In the JT Margaret Simpson set a new PB with an impressive 56.36 m, this would propel her to Ghana's first ever world championship medal. Before the final event, Klüft's lead was 18 points and Barber needed to beat her by 1.5 sec in the 800 m to win the gold medal. Barber stuck to Kelly Sotherton, the eventual winner of the race, until the last 200 m but Klüft timed her race perfectly to beat Barber with another PB.					
WR world record | AR area record | CR championship record | GR games record | NR national record | OR Olympic record | PB personal best | SB season best | WL world leading (in a given season)

== Exhibition events ==
Paralympic exhibition events at the World Championships:

Event	Gold		Silver		Bronze	
T54 Wheelchair racing 100 m men	David Weir; United Kingdom	14.15 NR	Kenny van Weeghel; Netherlands	14.19	Leo-Pekka Tähti; Finland	14.22
T54 Wheelchair racing 100 m men	Paralympic champion Leo-Pekka Tähti got off to a good start, but a battle between Britain's David Weir and Dutchman Kenny van Weeghel pushed both of them forward in the latter stages. Weir eventually won out, breaking his own British record, which he set in the semifinal at the 2004 Paralympics, by 0.02 s.					
T54 Wheelchair racing 200 m men	David Weir; United Kingdom	25.47	Kenny van Weeghel; Netherlands	25.80	Supachai Koysub; Thailand	26.03
T54 Wheelchair racing 200 m men	Weir completes a widely anticipated double.					
Wheelchair javelin men	Jacques Martin; Canada	24.97	Markku Niinimäki; Finland	23.82	Gerasimos Vrionis; Greece	16.75
T12 Visually impaired 200 m women	Adria Santos; Brazil	26.99	Purificacion Santamarta; Spain	27.08	Paraskeví Kantza; Greece	28.32 (PB)
WR world record | AR area record | CR championship record | GR games record | NR national record | OR Olympic record | PB personal best | SB season best | WL world leading (in a given season)

== Medal table ==
* Host nation (Finland)

Rank	Nation	Gold	Silver	Bronze	Total
1	United States (USA)	14	8	3	25
2	Russia (RUS)	7	7	4	18
3	Ethiopia (ETH)	3	4	2	9
4	Cuba (CUB)	3	3	1	7
5	France (FRA)	2	2	4	8
6	Sweden (SWE)	2	0	1	3
7	Bahrain (BHR)	2	0	0	2
8	Jamaica (JAM)	1	5	2	8
9	Kenya (KEN)	1	2	4	7
10	Morocco (MAR)	1	2	0	3
11	Germany (GER)	1	1	5	7
12	Belarus (BLR)	1	1	1	3
13	Bahamas (BAH)	1	1	0	2
13	Estonia (EST)	1	1	0	2
13	Netherlands (NED)	1	1	0	2
16	Great Britain (GBR)	1	0	2	3
17	Ecuador (ECU)	1	0	0	1
17	Lithuania (LTU)	1	0	0	1
17	Qatar (QAT)	1	0	0	1
17	Uganda (UGA)	1	0	0	1
17	Ukraine (UKR)	1	0	0	1
22	Poland (POL)	0	2	0	2
23	Czech Republic (CZE)	0	1	2	3
24	Ghana (GHA)	0	1	1	2
24	Spain (ESP)	0	1	1	2
26	China (CHN)	0	1	0	1
26	New Zealand (NZL)	0	1	0	1
26	Norway (NOR)	0	1	0	1
26	Tanzania (TAN)	0	1	0	1
26	Trinidad and Tobago (TRI)	0	1	0	1
31	Japan (JPN)	0	0	2	2
31	Portugal (POR)	0	0	2	2
31	Romania (ROU)	0	0	2	2
34	Australia (AUS)	0	0	1	1
34	Canada (CAN)	0	0	1	1
34	Finland (FIN)*	0	0	1	1
34	Hungary (HUN)	0	0	1	1
34	Italy (ITA)	0	0	1	1
34	Mexico (MEX)	0	0	1	1
34	Saint Kitts and Nevis (SKN)	0	0	1	1
Totals (40 entries)		47	48	46	141

== Commemorative coin ==
To commemorate the 2005 World Championships in Athletics the Finnish government issued a high-value commemorative euro coin, the €20 10th IAAF World Championships in Athletics commemorative coin, minted in 2005. The obverse of the coin features Helsinki Olympic Stadium and above the stadium random waves express the feeling of the games.

== See also ==
- 2005 in athletics (track and field)
