= 2000 World Junior Championships in Athletics – Women's 4 × 100 metres relay =

The women's 4×100 metres relay event at the 2000 World Junior Championships in Athletics was held in Santiago, Chile, at Estadio Nacional Julio Martínez Prádanos on 22 October.

== Medalists ==
Gold	Christa Kaufmann; Sina Schielke; Kerstin Grötzinger; Katchi Habel; Germany
Silver	Veronica Campbell; Nadine Palmer; Kerron Stewart; Noelle Graham; Jamaica
Bronze	Emma Rienas; Jenny Kallur; Susanna Kallur; Linda Fernström; Sweden

== Results ==
=== Final ===
22 October

Rank	Nation	Competitors	Time	Notes
1st place, gold medalist(s)	Germany	Christa Kaufmann; Sina Schielke; Kerstin Grötzinger; Katchi Habel	43.91	
2nd place, silver medalist(s)	Jamaica	Veronica Campbell; Nadine Palmer; Kerron Stewart; Noelle Graham	44.05	
3rd place, bronze medalist(s)	Sweden	Emma Rienas; Jenny Kallur; Susanna Kallur; Linda Fernström	44.78	
4	Italy	Erica Marchetti; Fulvia Amerighi; Marta Avogardi; Vincenza Calì	44.89	
5	Australia	Alicia Spencer; Jacquie Munro; Melanie Kleeberg; Sandra Porter	45.04	
6	Poland	Małgorzata Flejszar; Hanna Wardowska; Anita Hennig; Anna Radoszewska	45.23	
7	United States	Tameisha King; Khalilah Carpenter; Lavada Hill; Consuella Moore	45.43	
	France	Amélie Huyghes; Adriana Lamalle; Fanny Gérance; Gwladys Belliard	DQ	

=== Heats ===
22 October

==== Heat 1 ====
Rank	Nation	Competitors	Time	Notes
1	Jamaica	Shereefa Lloyd; Nadine Palmer; Kerron Stewart; Noelle Graham	44.26	Q
2	Australia	Alicia Spencer; Jacquie Munro; Melanie Kleeberg; Sandra Porter	45.06	Q
3	United States	Tameisha King; Khalilah Carpenter; Lavada Hill; Consuella Moore	45.15	Q
4	Poland	Małgorzata Flejszar; Hanna Wardowska; Anita Hennig; Anna Radoszewska	45.26	q
5	New Zealand	Anne Marie Spragg; Andrea Miller; Sarah Cowley; April Brough	45.71	
6	Chile	Francisca Guzmán; María José Echeverría; Fabiola Hecht; Pilar Fuenzalida	46.40	
	United Kingdom	Danielle Selley; Eleanor Caney; Donna Maylor; Vernicha James	DQ	

==== Heat 2 ====
Rank	Nation	Competitors	Time	Notes
1	Germany	Christa Kaufmann; Sina Schielke; Kerstin Grötzinger; Katchi Habel	44.28	Q
2	France	Amélie Huyghes; Adriana Lamalle; Fanny Gérance; Gwladys Belliard	44.55	Q
3	Sweden	Emma Rienas; Jenny Kallur; Susanna Kallur; Linda Fernström	45.08	Q
4	Italy	Erica Marchetti; Fulvia Amerighi; Marta Avogardi; Vincenza Calì	45.31	q
5	Venezuela	Jennifer Arveláez; Sandrine Legenort; Yusmelys García; Wilmary Álvarez	46.14	

== Participation ==
According to an unofficial count, 49 athletes from 12 countries participated in the event.

- Australia (4)
- Chile (4)
- France (4)
- Germany (4)
- Italy (4)
- Jamaica (5)
- New Zealand (4)
- Poland (4)
- Sweden (4)
- United Kingdom (4)
- United States (4)
- Venezuela (4)
