= 2000 World Junior Championships in Athletics – Women's 100 metres =

The women's 100 metres event at the 2000 World Junior Championships in Athletics was held in Santiago, Chile, at Estadio Nacional Julio Martínez Prádanos on 17 and 18 October.

== Medalists ==
Gold	Veronica Campbell; Jamaica
Silver	Katchi Habel; Germany
Bronze	Fana Ashby; Trinidad and Tobago

== Results ==
=== Final ===
18 October
Wind: +2.0 m/s

Rank	Name	Nationality	Time	Notes
1st place, gold medalist(s)	Veronica Campbell	Jamaica	11.12	
2nd place, silver medalist(s)	Katchi Habel	Germany	11.39	
3rd place, bronze medalist(s)	Fana Ashby	Trinidad and Tobago	11.47	
4	Vida Anim	Ghana	11.58	
5	Nadine Palmer	Jamaica	11.59	
6	Christa Kaufmann	Germany	11.66	
7	Emily Maher	Ireland	11.73	
8	Thatiana Ignâcio	Brazil	11.84	

=== Semifinals ===
18 October

==== Semifinal 1 ====
Wind: 0.0 m/s

Rank	Name	Nationality	Time	Notes
1	Veronica Campbell	Jamaica	11.58	Q
2	Christa Kaufmann	Germany	11.68	Q
3	Emily Maher	Ireland	11.80	Q
4	Thatiana Ignâcio	Brazil	11.80	Q
5	Consuella Moore	United States	11.85	
6	Gwladys Belliard	France	11.89	
7	Lenka Ficková	Czech Republic	11.96	
8	Melanie Kleeberg	Australia	12.00	

==== Semifinal 2 ====
Wind: -1.5 m/s

Rank	Name	Nationality	Time	Notes
1	Katchi Habel	Germany	11.43	Q
2	Fana Ashby	Trinidad and Tobago	11.56	Q
3	Vida Anim	Ghana	11.58	Q
4	Nadine Palmer	Jamaica	11.59	Q
5	Khalilah Carpenter	United States	11.81	
6	Małgorzata Flejszar	Poland	11.84	
7	Melisa Murillo	Colombia	11.84	
8	Amélie Huyghes	France	11.99	

=== Quarterfinals ===
17 October

==== Quarterfinal 1 ====
Wind: +0.3 m/s

Rank	Name	Nationality	Time	Notes
1	Fana Ashby	Trinidad and Tobago	11.58	Q
2	Katchi Habel	Germany	11.59	Q
3	Nadine Palmer	Jamaica	11.78	Q
4	Consuella Moore	United States	11.83	Q
5	Kadiatou Camara	Mali	11.93	
6	Priscilla Lopes	Canada	12.15	
7	Saeko Okayama	Japan	12.22	
8	Daniela Pávez	Chile	48.95	

==== Quarterfinal 2 ====
Wind: -0.5 m/s

Rank	Name	Nationality	Time	Notes
1	Vida Anim	Ghana	11.59	Q
2	Emily Maher	Ireland	11.62	Q
3	Lenka Ficková	Czech Republic	11.77	Q
4	Melisa Murillo	Colombia	11.78	Q
5	Gwladys Belliard	France	11.80	q
6	Małgorzata Flejszar	Poland	11.80	q
7	Emmelie Barenfeld	Sweden	11.92	
8	Donna Maylor	United Kingdom	12.22	

==== Quarterfinal 3 ====
Wind: +0.9 m/s

Rank	Name	Nationality	Time	Notes
1	Veronica Campbell	Jamaica	11.43	Q
2	Christa Kaufmann	Germany	11.58	Q
3	Khalilah Carpenter	United States	11.66	Q
4	Thatiana Ignâcio	Brazil	11.72	Q
5	Melanie Kleeberg	Australia	11.77	q
6	Amélie Huyghes	France	11.79	q
7	Houria Moussa	Algeria	11.84	
8	Linda Fernström	Sweden	11.88	

=== Heats ===
17 October

==== Heat 1 ====
Wind: 0.0 m/s

Rank	Name	Nationality	Time	Notes
1	Emily Maher	Ireland	11.71	Q
2	Melisa Murillo	Colombia	11.95	Q
3	Melanie Kleeberg	Australia	12.00	Q
4	Saeko Okayama	Japan	12.15	Q
5	Sara Maroncelli	San Marino	13.41	
6	Samigya Shakya	Nepal	13.77	

==== Heat 2 ====
Wind: +1.1 m/s

Rank	Name	Nationality	Time	Notes
1	Veronica Campbell	Jamaica	11.54	Q
2	Christa Kaufmann	Germany	11.65	Q
3	Kadiatou Camara	Mali	11.93	Q
4	Priscilla Lopes	Canada	12.08	Q
5	Fatou Bintou Fall	Senegal	12.24	
6	Marestella Torres	Philippines	12.55	
7	Eleana Leung	Hong Kong	12.65	

==== Heat 3 ====
Wind: +0.2 m/s

Rank	Name	Nationality	Time	Notes
1	Vida Anim	Ghana	11.63	Q
2	Nadine Palmer	Jamaica	11.66	Q
3	Consuella Moore	United States	11.85	Q
4	Emmelie Barenfeld	Sweden	11.89	Q
5	Amélie Huyghes	France	11.91	q
6	Małgorzata Flejszar	Poland	11.92	q
7	Seren Davies	Kiribati	13.91	
	Sarah Phillips	New Zealand	DNF	

==== Heat 4 ====
Wind: -0.1 m/s

Rank	Name	Nationality	Time	Notes
1	Fana Ashby	Trinidad and Tobago	11.53	Q
2	Katchi Habel	Germany	11.53	Q
3	Thatiana Ignâcio	Brazil	11.79	Q
4	Linda Fernström	Sweden	11.92	Q
5	Donna Maylor	United Kingdom	12.12	q
6	Daniela Pávez	Chile	12.14	q
7	Mariyana Dimitrova	Bulgaria	12.23	

==== Heat 5 ====
Wind: -1.1 m/s

Rank	Name	Nationality	Time	Notes
1	Khalilah Carpenter	United States	11.84	Q
2	Lenka Ficková	Czech Republic	11.91	Q
3	Gwladys Belliard	France	12.05	Q
4	Houria Moussa	Algeria	12.19	Q
5	Kimberly Walker	Trinidad and Tobago	12.22	
6	Carine Eyenga	Cameroon	12.38	
7	Aleksandra Vojneska	North Macedonia	12.46	
8	Estelle Ngigone	Gabon	12.94	

== Participation ==
According to an unofficial count, 36 athletes from 30 countries participated in the event.

- Algeria (1)
- Australia (1)
- Brazil (1)
- Bulgaria (1)
- Cameroon (1)
- Canada (1)
- Chile (1)
- Colombia (1)
- Czech Republic (1)
- France (2)
- Gabon (1)
- Germany (2)
- Ghana (1)
- Hong Kong (1)
- Ireland (1)
- Jamaica (2)
- Japan (1)
- Kiribati (1)
- North Macedonia (1)
- Mali (1)
- Nepal (1)
- New Zealand (1)
- Philippines (1)
- Poland (1)
- San Marino (1)
- Senegal (1)
- Sweden (2)
- Trinidad and Tobago (2)
- United Kingdom (1)
- United States (2)
