= 2000 World Junior Championships in Athletics – Men's 4 × 100 metres relay =

The men's 4×100 metres relay event at the 2000 World Junior Championships in Athletics was held in Santiago, Chile, at Estadio Nacional Julio Martínez Prádanos on 22 October.

== Medalists ==
Gold	Tyrone Edgar; Dwayne Grant; Tim Benjamin; Mark Lewis-Francis; United Kingdom
Silver	Ronald Pognon; Fabrice Calligny; Ladji Doucouré; Leslie Djhone; France
Bronze	Takashi Mogi; Kazuya Kitamura; Yusuke Omae; Hisashi Miyazaki; Japan

== Results ==
=== Final ===
22 October

Rank	Nation	Competitors	Time	Notes
1st place, gold medalist(s)	United Kingdom	Tyrone Edgar; Dwayne Grant; Tim Benjamin; Mark Lewis-Francis	39.05	
2nd place, silver medalist(s)	France	Ronald Pognon; Fabrice Calligny; Ladji Doucouré; Leslie Djhone	39.33	
3rd place, bronze medalist(s)	Japan	Takashi Mogi; Kazuya Kitamura; Yusuke Omae; Hisashi Miyazaki	39.47	
4	Trinidad and Tobago	Kirk Rudder; Marc Burns; Cleavon Dillon; Darrel Brown	40.03	
5	Jamaica	Michael Frater; Omar Brown; Winston Smith; Marvin Anderson	40.07	
6	Germany	Tobias Pfennig; Jan Mörsch; Sebastian Gatzka; Rasgawa Pinnock	40.42	
7	Hungary	László Szabó; Gergely Nagy; Gergely Németh; Imre Lórincz	40.57	
	Poland	Mariusz Latkowski; Marcin Jędrusiński; Wojciech Niczyporuk; Łukasz Chyła	DNF	

=== Heats ===
22 October

==== Heat 1 ====
Rank	Nation	Competitors	Time	Notes
1	United Kingdom	Tyrone Edgar; Dwayne Grant; Tim Benjamin; Mark Lewis-Francis	39.14	Q
2	Japan	Takashi Mogi; Kazuya Kitamura; Yusuke Omae; Hisashi Miyazaki	39.48	Q
3	Hungary	László Szabó; Gergely Nagy; Gergely Németh; Imre Lórincz	40.31	q
4	Chile	Iván Sandoval; Alfredo Jalón; Rodrigo Díaz; Diego Valdés	41.19	
5	Israel	Asaf Elderman; Michael Gurewitch; Maikel Waait; Tal Mor	41.41	
	Spain	Egoitz De Dios; Guillermo Vidal; Pablo Martínez; Martín Rodríguez	DNF	
	Italy	Gaetano Barone; Marco Marsadri; Enrico Rigato; Sergio Riva	DNF	

==== Heat 2 ====
Rank	Nation	Competitors	Time	Notes
1	France	Ronald Pognon; Daniel Abenzoar-Foulé; Ladji Doucouré; Leslie Djhone	39.91	Q
2	Trinidad and Tobago	Dion Rodriguez; Marc Burns; Kirk Rudder; Darrel Brown	40.33	Q
3	Portugal	Ricardo Pacheco; Ricardo Alves; Pedro Silva; Rui Tavares	40.73	
4	United States	Andra Fifer; Garland Martin; L'Eron George; Michael Thomas	41.01	
5	Mexico	Javier Baeza; Mario Trillo; Rubén Chávez; Jorge Ramírez	41.66	
	Australia	Campbell Tonkin; Tim Williams; Craig Sconce; Scott Richardson	DQ	

==== Heat 3 ====
Rank	Nation	Competitors	Time	Notes
1	Poland	Mariusz Latkowski; Marcin Jędrusiński; Wojciech Niczyporuk; Łukasz Chyła	39.61	Q
2	Jamaica	Michael Frater; Winston Smith; Dwight Shakespeare; Marvin Anderson	39.94	Q
3	Germany	Tobias Pfennig; Jan Mörsch; Sebastian Gatzka; Rasgawa Pinnock	40.34	q
4	New Zealand	Nick Madgwick; Hayden Townsend; Simon Jones; Lachie McLellan	40.42	
5	Switzerland	Vincent Trolliet; Andreas Oggier; Yann Mühlbauer; Marc Schneeberger	40.57	
6	Qatar	Hamad Abbas; Saad Al-Sofyani; Khaled Al-Obaidli; Mohamed Al-Thawadi	41.06	

== Participation ==
According to an unofficial count, 79 athletes from 19 countries participated in the event.

- Australia (4)
- Chile (4)
- France (5)
- Germany (4)
- Hungary (4)
- Israel (4)
- Italy (4)
- Jamaica (5)
- Japan (4)
- Mexico (4)
- New Zealand (4)
- Poland (4)
- Portugal (4)
- Qatar (4)
- Spain (4)
- Switzerland (4)
- Trinidad and Tobago (5)
- United Kingdom (4)
- United States (4)
