= 2000 World Junior Championships in Athletics – Men's 100 metres =

The men's 100 metres event at the 2000 World Junior Championships in Athletics was held in Santiago, Chile, at Estadio Nacional Julio Martínez Prádanos on 17 and 18 October.

== Medalists ==
Gold	Mark Lewis-Francis; United Kingdom
Silver	Salem Al-Yami; Saudi Arabia
Bronze	Marc Burns; Trinidad and Tobago

== Results ==
=== Final ===
18 October
Wind: +0.1 m/s

Rank	Name	Nationality	Time	Notes
1st place, gold medalist(s)	Mark Lewis-Francis	United Kingdom	10.12	
2nd place, silver medalist(s)	Salem Al-Yami	Saudi Arabia	10.38	
3rd place, bronze medalist(s)	Marc Burns	Trinidad and Tobago	10.40	
4	Darrel Brown	Trinidad and Tobago	10.40	
5	Michael Frater	Jamaica	10.46	
6	Ricardo Alves	Portugal	10.52	
7	Saad Al-Shahwani	Qatar	10.54	
8	Helly Ollarves	Venezuela	10.64	

=== Semifinals ===
18 October

==== Semifinal 1 ====
Wind: -0.3 m/s

Rank	Name	Nationality	Time	Notes
1	Mark Lewis-Francis	United Kingdom	10.24	Q
2	Darrel Brown	Trinidad and Tobago	10.49	Q
3	Ricardo Alves	Portugal	10.50	Q
4	Michael Frater	Jamaica	10.51	Q
5	Rae Edwards	United States	10.51	
6	Fabrice Calligny	France	10.59	
7	Takashi Mogi	Japan	10.67	
8	Khaled Al-Obaidli	Qatar	10.70	

==== Semifinal 2 ====
Wind: -0.3 m/s

Rank	Name	Nationality	Time	Notes
1	Salem Al-Yami	Saudi Arabia	10.37	Q
2	Marc Burns	Trinidad and Tobago	10.47	Q
3	Saad Al-Shahwani	Qatar	10.52	Q
4	Helly Ollarves	Venezuela	10.57	Q
5	Łukasz Chyła	Poland	10.58	
6	Kostyantyn Vasyukov	Ukraine	10.62	
7	Dwight Shakespeare	Jamaica	10.65	
8	Tim Williams	Australia	10.75	

=== Quarterfinals ===
17 October

==== Quarterfinal 1 ====
Wind: +0.7 m/s

Rank	Name	Nationality	Time	Notes
1	Marc Burns	Trinidad and Tobago	10.43	Q
2	Helly Ollarves	Venezuela	10.46	Q
3	Kostyantyn Vasyukov	Ukraine	10.46	Q
4	Dwight Shakespeare	Jamaica	10.50	Q
5	Scott Richardson	Australia	10.51	
6	Bruno Campos	Brazil	10.52	
7	Nico Grimbeeck	South Africa	10.69	
8	Morten Jensen	Denmark	10.70	

==== Quarterfinal 2 ====
Wind: -0.6 m/s

Rank	Name	Nationality	Time	Notes
1	Mark Lewis-Francis	United Kingdom	10.13	Q
2	Darrel Brown	Trinidad and Tobago	10.34	Q
3	Fabrice Calligny	France	10.45	Q
4	Khaled Al-Obaidli	Qatar	10.49	Q
5	Kazuya Kitamura	Japan	10.54	
6	Martín Rodríguez	Spain	10.59	
7	Sergio Riva	Italy	10.61	
8	Andra Fifer	United States	10.69	

==== Quarterfinal 3 ====
Wind: -0.3 m/s

Rank	Name	Nationality	Time	Notes
1	Ricardo Alves	Portugal	10.44	Q
2	Michael Frater	Jamaica	10.53	Q
3	Rae Edwards	United States	10.56	Q
4	Tim Williams	Australia	10.60	Q
5	Kevin Rans	Belgium	10.64	
6	Mariusz Latkowski	Poland	10.65	
7	David Socrier	France	10.80	
8	Ville Vakkuri	Finland	10.82	

==== Quarterfinal 4 ====
Wind: -1.1 m/s

Rank	Name	Nationality	Time	Notes
1	Salem Al-Yami	Saudi Arabia	10.32	Q
2	Saad Al-Shahwani	Qatar	10.48	Q
3	Łukasz Chyła	Poland	10.50	Q
4	Takashi Mogi	Japan	10.61	Q
5	Tyrone Edgar	United Kingdom	10.62	
6	Harry Adu-Mfum	Ghana	10.68	
7	Jan Mörsch	Germany	10.78	
8	Liu Chih-Hung	Chinese Taipei	11.01	

=== Heats ===
17 October

==== Heat 1 ====
Wind: +2.2 m/s

Rank	Name	Nationality	Time	Notes
1	Mark Lewis-Francis	United Kingdom	10.25 w	Q
2	Fabrice Calligny	France	10.53 w	Q
3	Takashi Mogi	Japan	10.56 w	Q
4	Saad Al-Shahwani	Qatar	10.56 w	q
5	Kevin Rans	Belgium	10.66 w	q
6	Pablo Del Valle	Argentina	10.77 w	
7	Dmitriy Chumichkin	Azerbaijan	11.04 w	

==== Heat 2 ====
Wind: +1.1 m/s

Rank	Name	Nationality	Time	Notes
1	Bruno Campos	Brazil	10.49	Q
2	Ville Vakkuri	Finland	10.53	Q
3	Mariusz Latkowski	Poland	10.57	Q
4	Sergio Riva	Italy	10.64	q
5	Nico Grimbeeck	South Africa	10.66	q
6	Gergely Németh	Hungary	10.75	
7	Rasgawa Pinnock	Germany	10.80	
8	Guillermo Dongo	Suriname	10.80	

==== Heat 3 ====
Wind: -0.6 m/s

Rank	Name	Nationality	Time	Notes
1	Salem Al-Yami	Saudi Arabia	10.27	Q
2	Dwight Shakespeare	Jamaica	10.54	Q
3	Jan Mörsch	Germany	10.66	Q
4	Tal Mor	Israel	10.84	
5	Ernst Pollman	Namibia	10.84	
6	Jorge Ramírez	Mexico	11.08	
7	Ahmed Hunain	Maldives	11.73	

==== Heat 4 ====
Wind: +0.8 m/s

Rank	Name	Nationality	Time	Notes
1	Ricardo Alves	Portugal	10.46	Q
2	Tyrone Edgar	United Kingdom	10.46	Q
3	Khaled Al-Obaidli	Qatar	10.52	Q
4	David Socrier	France	10.72	q
5	Rodrigo Díaz	Chile	10.75	
6	Churandy Martina	Netherlands Antilles	10.77	
7	Mario Trillo	Mexico	10.86	
8	David Falealili	New Zealand	13.16	

==== Heat 5 ====
Wind: -1.3 m/s

Rank	Name	Nationality	Time	Notes
1	Darrel Brown	Trinidad and Tobago	10.60	Q
2	Harry Adu-Mfum	Ghana	10.62	Q
3	Scott Richardson	Australia	10.65	Q
4	Rui Tavares	Portugal	10.89	
5	Kenneth Goeieman	Namibia	10.92	
6	Gergely Nagy	Hungary	10.97	
7	Bob Colville	Costa Rica	11.00	
8	Darren Gilford	Malta	11.18	

==== Heat 6 ====
Wind: -0.5 m/s

Rank	Name	Nationality	Time	Notes
1	Łukasz Chyła	Poland	10.54	Q
2	Michael Frater	Jamaica	10.59	Q
3	Tim Williams	Australia	10.65	Q
4	Mihaíl Perrákis	Greece	10.75	
5	Saad Al-Zefiri	Kuwait	10.85	
6	Enrico Rigato	Italy	10.87	
7	Poh Seng Song	Singapore	11.14	
8	Marcos Nsi	Equatorial Guinea	11.17	

==== Heat 7 ====
Wind: -0.8 m/s

Rank	Name	Nationality	Time	Notes
1	Marc Burns	Trinidad and Tobago	10.49	Q
2	Martín Rodríguez	Spain	10.69	Q
3	Andra Fifer	United States	10.73	Q
4	Kazuya Kitamura	Japan	10.74	q
5	Michael Kummer	Austria	10.84	
6	Lachie McLellan	New Zealand	10.92	
7	Henry Ben	Papua New Guinea	10.95	
8	Kelly Olegerill	Palau	11.29	

==== Heat 8 ====
Wind: +1.3 m/s

Rank	Name	Nationality	Time	Notes
1	Rae Edwards	United States	10.51	Q
2	Kostyantyn Vasyukov	Ukraine	10.53	Q
3	Helly Ollarves	Venezuela	10.59	Q
4	Morten Jensen	Denmark	10.67	q
5	Liu Chih-Hung	Chinese Taipei	10.72	q
6	Nazmizan Mohamad	Malaysia	10.80	
7	Leonid Hiunidi	Israel	11.00	
	Roland Kwitt	Austria	DQ	IAAF rule 162.7

== Participation ==
According to an unofficial count, 62 athletes from 44 countries participated in the event.

- Argentina (1)
- Australia (2)
- Austria (2)
- Azerbaijan (1)
- Belgium (1)
- Brazil (1)
- Chile (1)
- Chinese Taipei (1)
- Costa Rica (1)
- Denmark (1)
- Equatorial Guinea (1)
- Finland (1)
- France (2)
- Germany (2)
- Ghana (1)
- Greece (1)
- Hungary (2)
- Israel (2)
- Italy (2)
- Jamaica (2)
- Japan (2)
- Kuwait (1)
- Malaysia (1)
- Maldives (1)
- Malta (1)
- Mexico (2)
- Namibia (2)
- Netherlands Antilles (1)
- New Zealand (2)
- Palau (1)
- Papua New Guinea (1)
- Poland (2)
- Portugal (2)
- Qatar (2)
- Saudi Arabia (1)
- Singapore (1)
- South Africa (1)
- Spain (1)
- Suriname (1)
- Trinidad and Tobago (2)
- Ukraine (1)
- United Kingdom (2)
- United States (2)
- Venezuela (1)
