= 1999 European Athletics Junior Championships =

- Dates: 5–8 August
- Host city: Riga, Latvia
- Venue: Daugava Stadium
- Level: Under-20
- Events: 43

The 1999 European Athletics Junior Championships were held in Riga, Latvia on August 5–8.

== Men's results ==
Event	Gold		Silver		Bronze	
100 m	Fabrice Calligny; France	10.19	Mark Lewis-Francis; Great Britain	10.37	Kostyantyn Vasyukov; Ukraine	10.41
200 m	Alessandro Cavallaro; Italy	20.46	Tim Benjamin; Great Britain	20.60	Chris Lambert; Great Britain	20.67
400 m	Ruwen Faller; Germany	46.38	Filip Walotka; Poland	46.42	Georgios Doupis; Greece	47.03
800 m	Yuriy Borzakovskiy; Russia	1:50.38	Nick Andrews; Great Britain	1:50.92	Bram Som; Netherlands	1:50.96
1500 m	Franek Haschke; Germany	3:44.17	Bert Leenaerts; Belgium	3:44.47	Stefan Beumer; Netherlands	3:45.13
5000 m	Wolfram Müller; Germany	14:05.98	Radu Stroia; Romania	14:11.05	Mattia Maccagnan; Italy	14:12.51
10,000 m	Hans Janssens; Belgium	29:49.59	Radu Stroia; Romania	29:55.18	Oliver Bodor; Hungary	30:00.91
3000 m steeplechase	Jakub Czaja; Poland	8:41.91	Vadim Slobodenyuk; Ukraine	8:44.48	Kevin Paulsen; France	8:45.69
110 m hurdles	Felipe Vivancos; Spain; Chris Baillie; Great Britain	13.92			Thomas Blaschek; Germany	13.93
400 m hurdles	Dmitriy Zhukov; Russia	51.46	Richard Mcdonald; Great Britain	51.62	Luca Bortolaso; Italy	51.80
4 × 100 metres relay	France; Damien Degroote; Fabrice Calligny; Julien Arame; Leslie Djhone	39.49	Poland; Mariusz Latkowski; Łukasz Chyła; Marcin Jędrusiński; Przemysław Rogowski	39.67	Italy; Simone Mare; Pantaleo Spina; Marco Cuneo; Alessandro Cavallaro	39.78
4 × 400 metres relay	Germany; Stefan Giessler; Benjamin Mielke; Ralf Riester; Ruwen Faller	3:07.42	Poland; Tomasz Smolarczyk; Bartosz Ozdarski; Rafał Wieruszewski; Filip Walotka	3:08.15	Great Britain; Ian Lowthian; Chris Bennett; Adam Buckley; Kris Stewart	3:08.97
10,000 m walk	Māris Putenis; Latvia	40:27.37	Vladimir Potemin; Russia	40:28.46	José Dominguez; Spain	40:34.82
High jump	Christian Olsson; Sweden	2.21 m	Gregory Gabella; France	2.19 m	Yaroslav Rybakov; Russia	2.16 m
Pole vault	Sébastien Homo; France	5.35 m	Fabrice Fortin; France	5.35 m	Thilo Kraus; Germany	5.20 m
Long jump	Leslie Djhone; France	7.88 m	Krasimir Argirov; Bulgaria	7.74 m	Tomasz Mateusiak; Poland	7.60 m
Triple jump	Tosin Oke; Great Britain	16.57 m	Christian Olsson; Sweden	16.18 m	Marian Oprea; Romania	15.98 m
Shot put	Rutger Smith; Netherlands	18.27 m	Tomasz Chrzanowski; Poland	18.19 m	Teijo Koopikka; Finland	18.01 m
Discus throw	Rutger Smith; Netherlands	52.89 m	Pavel Lyzhin; Belarus	52.15 m	Heinrich Seitz; Germany	50.76 m
Hammer throw	Olli-Pekka Karjalainen; Finland	75.80 m	Wojciech Kondratowicz; Poland	74.12 m	Markus Esser; Germany	66.68 m
Javelin throw	Tomas Intas; Lithuania	77.88 m	David Parker; Great Britain	77.26 m	Tim Werner; Germany	76.31 m
Decathlon	Aki Heikkinen; Finland	7881 pts	Jaakko Ojaniemi; Finland	7763 pts	Roland Schwarzl; Austria	7447 pts

== Women's results ==
Event	Gold		Silver		Bronze	
100 m	Sina Schielke; Germany	11.39	Johanna Manninen; Finland	11.47	Adrianna Lamalle; France	11.51
200 m	Sina Schielke; Germany	23.08	Johanna Manninen; Finland	23.26	Ciara Sheehy; Ireland	23.49
400 m	Olesya Zykina; Russia	52.00	Natalya Lavshuk; Russia	53.44	Justyna Karolkiewicz; Poland	53.78
800 m	Irina Latve; Latvia	2:03.45	Yuliya Gurtovenko; Ukraine	2:03.81	Sibel Özyurt; Turkey	2:03.82
1.500 m	Sibel Özyurt; Turkey	4:15.62	Natalya Sidorenko; Russia	4:15.91	Yekaterina Noskova; Russia	4:16.56
3.000 m	Olga Roseyeva; Russia	9:07.79	Tezeta Sürekli; Turkey	9:08.09	Sonja Stolić; Yugoslavia	9:10.01
5.000 m	Tezeta Sürekli; Turkey	16:01.32	Elvan Can; Turkey	16:06.40	Yelena Tolstygina; Belarus	16:17.04
100 m hurdles	Reina-Flor Okori; France	13.16	Fanny Gérance; France	13.27	Manuela Bosco; Finland	13.34
400 m hurdles	Alena Rücklová; Czech Republic	58.55	Benedetta Ceccarelli; Italy	59.10	Nicola Sanders; Great Britain	59.21
4 × 100 metres relay	Germany; Mirjam Wallner; Sina Schielke; Kerstin Grötzinger; Annegret Dietrich	44.04	Finland; Manuela Bosco; Katja Salivaara; Johanna Manninen; Heidi Hannula	44.40	France; Fanny Gérance; Adriana Lamalle; Gwladys Belliard; Nadia Raymond	44.69
4 × 400 metres relay	Russia; Yana Vetcherkevitch; Olga Golendukhina; Natalya Lavshuk; Olesya Zykina	3:34.06	Germany; Claudia Hempel; Daniela Mark; Claudia Hoffmann; Karoline Hagen	3:34.84	Poland; Justyna Karolkiewicz; Aneta Lemiesz; Ilona Szymerska; Żaneta Tomczyk	3:35.24
5000 m walk	Larisa Safronova; Russia	21:40.77	Daniela Cârlan; Romania	21:46.15	Ryta Turava; Belarus	21:48.11
High jump	Viktoriya Slivka; Russia	1.90 m	Christelle Preau; France	1.88 m	Marina Kuptsova; Russia	1.88 m
Pole vault	Yvonne Buschbaum; Germany	4.25 m	Annika Becker; Germany	4.20 m	Amandine Homo; France	4.15 m
Long jump	Maria Chiara Baccini; Italy	6.39 m	Concepción Montaner; Spain	6.39 m	Silvia Favre; Italy	6.25 m
Triple jump	Mariana Bogatie; Romania	13.57 m	Mariana Solomon; Romania	13.39 m	Anna Pyatykh; Russia	13.36 m
Shot put	Nadzeya Astapchuk; Belarus	18.20 m	Oksana Gromova; Russia	16.31 m	Bianca Grosser; Germany	16.24 m
Discus throw	Wioletta Potępa; Poland	53.93 m	Adina Mocanu; Romania	53.89 m	Ilona Rutjes; Netherlands	53.19 m
Hammer throw	Bianca Achilles; Germany	66.81 m	Sini Pöyry; Finland	63.60 m	Merja Korpela; Finland	59.51 m
Javelin throw	Nikolett Szabó; Hungary	61.52 m	Carolin Soboll; Germany	56.86 m	Xénia Frajka; Hungary	54.29 m
Heptathlon	Maren Freisen; Germany	5909 pts	Michaela Hejnová; Czech Republic	5786 pts	Antónia Schulze-Borges; Germany	5543 pts

== Medal table ==
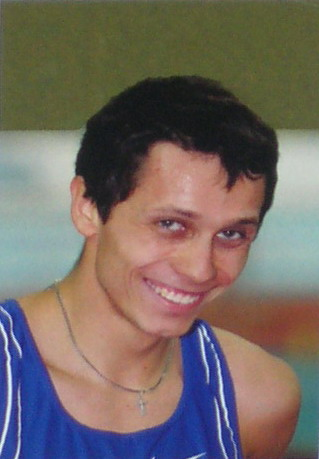
Yuriy Borzakovskiy won the 800 metres gold.

Rank	Nation	Gold	Silver	Bronze	Total
1	Germany (GER)	10	3	7	20
2	Russia (RUS)	7	4	4	15
3	France (FRA)	5	4	4	13
4	Finland (FIN)	2	5	3	10
4	Great Britain (GBR)	2	5	3	10
4	Poland (POL)	2	5	3	10
7	Turkey (TUR)	2	2	1	5
8	Italy (ITA)	2	1	4	7
9	Netherlands (NED)	2	0	3	5
10	Latvia (LAT)	2	0	0	2
11	Romania (ROM)	1	5	1	7
12	Belarus (BLR)	1	1	2	4
13	Spain (ESP)	1	1	1	3
14	Belgium (BEL)	1	1	0	2
14	Czech Republic (CZE)	1	1	0	2
14	Sweden (SWE)	1	1	0	2
17	Hungary (HUN)	1	0	2	3
18	Lithuania (LTU)	1	0	0	1
19	Ukraine (UKR)	0	2	1	3
20	Bulgaria (BUL)	0	1	0	1
21	Austria (AUT)	0	0	1	1
21	Greece (GRE)	0	0	1	1
21	Ireland (IRL)	0	0	1	1
21	Yugoslavia (FR Yugoslavia)	0	0	1	1
Totals (24 entries)		44	42	43	129
