= 2000 World Junior Championships in Athletics – Women's 200 metres =

2000 sporting event

The women's 200 metres event at the 2000 World Junior Championships in Athletics was held in Santiago, Chile, at Estadio Nacional Julio Martínez Prádanos on 19, 20 and 21 October.

== Medalists ==
Gold	Veronica Campbell; Jamaica
Silver	Sina Schielke; Germany
Bronze	Vida Anim; Ghana

== Results ==
=== Final ===
21 October
Wind: +0.7 m/s

Rank	Name	Nationality	Time	Notes
1st place, gold medalist(s)	Veronica Campbell	Jamaica	22.87	
2nd place, silver medalist(s)	Sina Schielke	Germany	23.20	
3rd place, bronze medalist(s)	Vida Anim	Ghana	23.81	
4	Małgorzata Flejszar	Poland	23.94	
5	Vernicha James	United Kingdom	23.96	
6	Emily Maher	Ireland	24.00	
7	Melanie Kleeberg	Australia	24.39	
8	Kim Wall	United Kingdom	24.46	

=== Semifinals ===
20 October

==== Semifinal 1 ====
Wind: -2.1 m/s

Rank	Name	Nationality	Time	Notes
1	Sina Schielke	Germany	23.44	Q
2	Vida Anim	Ghana	23.80	Q
3	Melanie Kleeberg	Australia	24.05	Q
4	Kim Wall	United Kingdom	24.14	Q
5	Hanna Wardowska	Poland	24.20	
6	Vincenza Calì	Italy	24.30	
7	April Brough	New Zealand	24.32	
8	Wilmary Álvarez	Venezuela	24.54	

==== Semifinal 2 ====
Wind: +1.6 m/s

Rank	Name	Nationality	Time	Notes
1	Veronica Campbell	Jamaica	23.19	Q
2	Vernicha James	United Kingdom	23.59	Q
3	Emily Maher	Ireland	23.85	Q
4	Małgorzata Flejszar	Poland	23.88	Q
5	Kerstin Grötzinger	Germany	24.04	
6	Sandra Porter	Australia	24.13	
7	Silja Ulfarsdóttir	Iceland	24.22	
8	Maja Nose	Slovenia	24.68	

=== Quarterfinals ===
19 October

==== Quarterfinal 1 ====
Wind: 0.0 m/s

Rank	Name	Nationality	Time	Notes
1	Veronica Campbell	Jamaica	23.69	Q
2	Emily Maher	Ireland	23.94	Q
3	Kim Wall	United Kingdom	24.04	Q
4	Melanie Kleeberg	Australia	24.17	Q
5	April Brough	New Zealand	24.46	q
6	Silja Ulfarsdóttir	Iceland	24.54	q
7	Perrine Prunier	France	24.57	
8	Mariyana Dimitrova	Bulgaria	24.60	

==== Quarterfinal 2 ====
Wind: -1.0 m/s

Rank	Name	Nationality	Time	Notes
1	Vida Anim	Ghana	23.84	Q
2	Vincenza Calì	Italy	24.07	Q
3	Kerstin Grötzinger	Germany	24.09	Q
4	Wilmary Álvarez	Venezuela	24.27	Q
5	Maja Nose	Slovenia	24.41	q
6	Hanna Wardowska	Poland	24.49	q
7	Ashlee Williams	United States	24.62	
8	Aleksandra Vojneska	North Macedonia	25.19	

==== Quarterfinal 3 ====
Wind: -1.4 m/s

Rank	Name	Nationality	Time	Notes
1	Sina Schielke	Germany	23.70	Q
2	Vernicha James	United Kingdom	23.76	Q
3	Małgorzata Flejszar	Poland	24.30	Q
4	Sandra Porter	Australia	24.58	Q
5	Fatou Bintou Fall	Senegal	24.71	
6	Fabiola Hecht	Chile	24.99	
7	Khalilah Carpenter	United States	25.02	
	Fana Ashby	Trinidad and Tobago	DQ	

=== Heats ===
19 October

==== Heat 1 ====
Wind: +1.0 m/s

Rank	Name	Nationality	Time	Notes
1	Veronica Campbell	Jamaica	23.98	Q
2	Małgorzata Flejszar	Poland	24.21	Q
3	Maja Nose	Slovenia	24.24	Q
4	Sandra Porter	Australia	24.54	Q
5	Mariyana Dimitrova	Bulgaria	24.62	q
6	Kimberly Walker	Trinidad and Tobago	25.09	
7	Seren Davies	Kiribati	28.80	

==== Heat 2 ====
Wind: -0.5 m/s

Rank	Name	Nationality	Time	Notes
1	Kerstin Grötzinger	Germany	24.28	Q
2	Silja Ulfarsdóttir	Iceland	24.33	Q
3	Khalilah Carpenter	United States	24.55	Q
4	Fatou Bintou Fall	Senegal	24.66	Q
5	Véronique Montero	France	24.81	
6	Tiandra Ponteen	Saint Kitts and Nevis	25.25	
7	Mereoni Raluve	Fiji	26.02	

==== Heat 3 ====
Wind: -1.2 m/s

Rank	Name	Nationality	Time	Notes
1	Vernicha James	United Kingdom	23.86	Q
2	Emily Maher	Ireland	24.51	Q
3	Perrine Prunier	France	24.88	Q
4	Aleksandra Vojneska	North Macedonia	25.44	Q
5	Janice Josephs	South Africa	25.65	
6	Carine Eyenga	Cameroon	26.04	

==== Heat 4 ====
Wind: -0.4 m/s

Rank	Name	Nationality	Time	Notes
1	Kim Wall	United Kingdom	24.14	Q
2	Vincenza Calì	Italy	24.25	Q
3	Fana Ashby	Trinidad and Tobago	24.46	Q
4	Wilmary Álvarez	Venezuela	24.51	Q
5	Ashlee Williams	United States	24.68	q
6	Fabiola Hecht	Chile	24.70	q
7	Gladys Thompson	Liberia	27.94	

==== Heat 5 ====
Wind: -2.1 m/s

Rank	Name	Nationality	Time	Notes
1	Vida Anim	Ghana	23.94	Q
2	Sina Schielke	Germany	23.96	Q
3	Hanna Wardowska	Poland	24.27	Q
4	April Brough	New Zealand	24.37	Q
5	Melanie Kleeberg	Australia	24.43	q
6	Eleana Leung	Hong Kong	26.23	

== Participation ==
According to an unofficial count, 33 athletes from 26 countries participated in the event.

- Australia (2)
- Bulgaria (1)
- Cameroon (1)
- Chile (1)
- Fiji (1)
- France (2)
- Germany (2)
- Ghana (1)
- Hong Kong (1)
- Iceland (1)
- Ireland (1)
- Italy (1)
- Jamaica (1)
- Kiribati (1)
- Liberia (1)
- North Macedonia (1)
- New Zealand (1)
- Poland (2)
- Saint Kitts and Nevis (1)
- Senegal (1)
- Slovenia (1)
- South Africa (1)
- Trinidad and Tobago (2)
- United Kingdom (2)
- United States (2)
- Venezuela (1)
