= Emily Maher =

Irish sprinter

Personal information
- Born: 2 May 1981 (age 45) Kilkenny, Ireland
- Height: 1.72 m (5 ft 8 in)
- Weight: 60 kg (132 lb)

Sport
- Sport: Athletics
- Events: 60m, 100 m, 200 m
- Club: KHC

Emily Maher (born 2 May 1981 in Kilkenny) is an Irish retired athlete who specialised in the sprinting events. She represented her country at the 2000 Summer Olympics, as well as the 2006 World Indoor Championships. She won the sprint double, 100m and 200m at the World Youth Olympics in Moscow 1998. Emily was coached by Linford Christie and is the first Irish person to reach a sprint final at a major championship (World Juniors Chile 1999) Emily also anchored the first Irish relay (4 × 100 m) to win a medal at a major championship in a time of 44.69 at the World University Games in Izmir Turkey 2005

== Competition record ==
Year	Competition	Venue	Position	Event	Notes
Representing Ireland
1998	World Youth Games	Moscow, Russia	1st	100 m	11.93
1998	World Youth Games	Moscow, Russia	1st	200 m	24.16
1998	World Junior Championships	Annecy, France	20th (qf)	200 m	24.28
1999	European Junior Championships	Riga, Latvia	4th	100 m	11.72
1999	European Junior Championships	Riga, Latvia	4th	200 m	23.70
2000	World Junior Championships	Santiago, Chile	7th	100 m	11.73
2000	World Junior Championships	Santiago, Chile	6th	200 m	24.00
2000	Olympic Games	Sydney, Australia	16th (h)	4 × 400 m relay	3:32.24
2001	European U23 Championships	Amsterdam, Netherlands	8th	100 m	11.93
2001	European U23 Championships	Amsterdam, Netherlands	6th	200 m	23.80
2003	European U23 Championships	Bydgoszcz, Poland	20th (h)	100 m	11.95
2003	European U23 Championships	Bydgoszcz, Poland	–	4 × 100 m relay	DQ
2005	European Indoor Championships	Madrid, Spain	23rd (h)	60 m	7.60
2005	Universiade	İzmir, Turkey	11th (sf)	200 m	23.89
2005	Universiade	İzmir, Turkey	3rd	4 × 100 m relay	44.69
2005	Universiade	İzmir, Turkey	7th	4 × 400 m relay	3:36.10
2006	World Indoor Championships	Moscow, Russia	15th (sf)	60 m	7.37

== Personal bests ==
Outdoor

- 100 metres – 11.40 (+2.0 m/s) (Bedford 2000)
- 200 metres – 23.34 (-0.6 m/s) (Dublin 2000)
- 400 metres – 53.61 (2000)

Indoor

- 60 metres – 7.36 (Belfast 2006)
- 200 metres – 24.00 (Belfast 2003)
