= 2000 World Junior Championships in Athletics – Women's 3000 metres =

The women's 3000 metres event at the 2000 World Junior Championships in Athletics was held in Santiago, Chile, at Estadio Nacional Julio Martínez Prádanos on 22 October.

== Medalists ==
Gold	Beatrice Chepchumba; Kenya
Silver	Jane Chepkoech; Kenya
Bronze	Etalemahu Kidane; Ethiopia

== Results ==
=== Final ===
22 October

Rank	Name	Nationality	Time	Notes
1st place, gold medalist(s)	Beatrice Chepchumba	Kenya	9:08.80	
2nd place, silver medalist(s)	Jane Chepkoech	Kenya	9:10.05	
3rd place, bronze medalist(s)	Etalemahu Kidane	Ethiopia	9:11.55	
4	Chen Fang	China	9:12.53	
5	Mestawat Tufa	Ethiopia	9:16.73	
6	Elvan Can	Turkey	9:28.20	
7	Carol Henry	Canada	9:31.88	
8	Jéssica Augusto	Portugal	9:33.37	
9	Sonia Bejarano	Spain	9:36.01	
10	Ruth McDonnell	Australia	9:40.52	
11	Türkan Erişmiş	Turkey	9:43.75	
12	Wang Xiaoming	China	9:44.09	
13	Riina Tolonen	Finland	9:46.90	
14	Lucélia Peres	Brazil	9:51.16	
15	Elaine du Plessis	South Africa	9:52.86	
16	Nana Gutanaidze	Georgia	11:15.92	
17	Anna Markelova	Turkmenistan	11:20.20	
18	Uuriintsolmon Gangarpurev	Mongolia	11:42.31	
	Malika Asahssah	Morocco	DNF	

== Participation ==
According to an unofficial count, 19 athletes from 15 countries participated in the event.

- Australia (1)
- Brazil (1)
- Canada (1)
- China (2)
- Ethiopia (2)
- Finland (1)
- Georgia (1)
- Kenya (2)
- Mongolia (1)
- Morocco (1)
- Portugal (1)
- South Africa (1)
- Spain (1)
- Turkey (2)
- Turkmenistan (1)
