= Łukasz Chyła =

Polish sprinter (born 1981)

Personal information
- Nationality: Poland
- Born: 31 March 1981 (age 45) Dziemiany, Poland
- Height: 1.74 m (5 ft 9 in)
- Weight: 71 kg (157 lb)

Sport
- Sport: Running
- Events: 100 metres, 200 metres
Medal record
Men's athletics
Representing Poland
European Championships
Silver medal – second place	2002 Munich	4 × 100 m relay
Silver medal – second place	2006 Gothenburg	4 × 100 m relay

Łukasz Chyła (born 31 March 1981 in Dziemiany) is a track and field sprint athlete who competes internationally for Poland.

Chyła represented Poland at the 2008 Summer Olympics in Beijing. He competed at the 4 × 100 metres relay together with Marcin Jędrusiński, Dariusz Kuć and Marcin Andrzej Nowak. In their qualification heat they did not finish due to a mistake in the baton exchange and they were eliminated.

== Competition record ==
Year	Competition	Venue	Position	Event	Notes
Representing Poland
1999	European Junior Championships	Riga, Latvia	11th (h)	200 m	21.51
1999	European Junior Championships	Riga, Latvia	2nd	4 × 100 m relay	39.67
2000	World Junior Championships	Santiago, Chile	10th (sf)	100 m	10.58 (wind: -0.3 m/s)
2000	World Junior Championships	Santiago, Chile	3rd (h)	4 × 100 m relay	39.61
2001	European U23 Championships	Amsterdam, Netherlands	2nd	200 m	20.99 (wind: 0.1 m/s)
2001	European U23 Championships	Amsterdam, Netherlands	1st	4 × 100 m relay	39.41
2001	World Championships	Edmonton, Canada	6th	4 × 100 m relay	39.71
2002	European Championships	Munich, Germany	2nd	4 × 100 m relay	38.71
2003	European U23 Championships	Bydgoszcz, Poland	4th	100 m	10.35 (wind: 1.2 m/s)
2003	European U23 Championships	Bydgoszcz, Poland	1st (h)	4 × 100 m relay	39.63
2003	World Championships	Paris, France	5th	4 × 100 m relay	38.96
2004	World Indoor Championships	Budapest, Hungary	17th (sf)	60 m	6.73
2004	Olympic Games	Athens, Greece	20th (qf)	100 m	10.23
2004	Olympic Games	Athens, Greece	5th	4 × 100 m relay	38.54
2005	European Indoor Championships	Madrid, Spain	6th	60 m	6.66
2005	World Championships	Helsinki, Finland	23rd (h)	100 m	10.39
2006	European Championships	Gothenburg, Sweden	8th (sf)	100 m	10.30
2006	European Championships	Gothenburg, Sweden	2nd	4 × 100 m relay	39.05
2007	European Indoor Championships	Birmingham, United Kingdom	17th (h)	60 m	6.75
2007	World Championships	Osaka, Japan	7th	4 × 100 m relay	DNF
2008	Olympic Games	Beijing, China	–	4 × 100 m relay	DNF
