= 2003 European Athletics U23 Championships – Men's 100 metres =

The men's 100 metres event at the 2003 European Athletics U23 Championships was held in Bydgoszcz, Poland, at Zawisza Stadion on 17 and 19 July.

== Medalists ==
Gold	Ronald Pognon; France
Silver	Argo Golberg; Estonia
Bronze	Fabrice Calligny; France

== Results ==
=== Final ===
19 July
Wind: 1.2 m/s

Rank	Name	Nationality	Time	Notes
1st place, gold medalist(s)	Ronald Pognon	France	10.19	CR
2nd place, silver medalist(s)	Argo Golberg	Estonia	10.28	
3rd place, bronze medalist(s)	Fabrice Calligny	France	10.34	
4	Łukasz Chyła	Poland	10.35	
5	Tyrone Edgar	Great Britain	10.35	
6	Nick Smith	Great Britain	10.40	
7	Gergely Németh	Hungary	10.49	
8	Ricardo Alves	Portugal	10.52	

=== Heats ===
17 July
Qualified: first 2 in each heat and 2 best to the Final

==== Heat 1 ====
Wind: 0.1 m/s

Rank	Name	Nationality	Time	Notes
1	Tyrone Edgar	Great Britain	10.36	Q
2	Argo Golberg	Estonia	10.36	Q
3	Tal Mor	Israel	10.60	
4	Adrian Stefan	Romania	10.60	
5	Zoran Josifovski	North Macedonia	11.36	
	Admir Bregu	Albania	DNS	

==== Heat 2 ====
Wind: 0.0 m/s

Rank	Name	Nationality	Time	Notes
1	Ronald Pognon	France	10.30	Q
2	Łukasz Chyła	Poland	10.32	Q
3	Egoitz de Dios	Spain	10.63	
4	Darren Gilford	Malta	10.70	
5	Marius Broening	Germany	10.77	
6	Pontus Nilsson	Sweden	10.80	

==== Heat 3 ====
Wind: -0.2 m/s

Rank	Name	Nationality	Time	Notes
1	Fabrice Calligny	France	10.40	Q
2	Nick Smith	Great Britain	10.47	Q
3	Gergely Németh	Hungary	10.49	q
4	Ricardo Alves	Portugal	10.52	q
5	Neophytos Michael	Cyprus	10.61	
6	Rasgawa Pinnock	Germany	10.83	

== Participation ==
According to an unofficial count, 17 athletes from 14 countries participated in the event.

- Cyprus (1)
- Estonia (1)
- France (2)
- Germany (2)
- Great Britain (2)
- Hungary (1)
- Israel (1)
- North Macedonia (1)
- Malta (1)
- Poland (1)
- Portugal (1)
- Romania (1)
- Spain (1)
- Sweden (1)
