= Mielke =

Mielke is a German surname.

Name Meaning: Eastern German (of Slavic origin): from a pet form of a Slavic compound personal name with the first element Milo-, from mil ‘favor’, ‘grace’. Dutch: from a pet form of Miele 3.

Similar surnames: Miele, Bielke, Milko, Milke, Milk, Ziemke, Hilke, Zielke, Milkey

Notable people with the surname include:

- Antonie Mielke (1856–1907), German operatic soprano
- Benjamin Mielke (born 1981), German bobsledder
- Erich Mielke (1907–2000), Head of the East German Stasi 1957–1989
- Gary Mielke (born 1963), American baseball player
- Günter Mielke (1942–2010), West German long-distance runner
- Janet Soergel Mielke (born 1937), American politician
- Marcus Mielke (born 1975), German rower
- Rüdiger Mielke (born 1944), German footballer
