= 2001 European Athletics U23 Championships – Men's 200 metres =

The men's 200 metres event at the 2001 European Athletics U23 Championships was held in Amsterdam, Netherlands, at Olympisch Stadion on 14 July.

== Medalists ==
Gold	Marcin Jędrusiński; Poland
Silver	Łukasz Chyła; Poland
Bronze	Mark Howard; Ireland

== Results ==
=== Final ===
14 July
Wind: 0.1 m/s

Rank	Name	Nationality	Time	Notes
1st place, gold medalist(s)	Marcin Jędrusiński	Poland	20.94	
2nd place, silver medalist(s)	Łukasz Chyła	Poland	20.99	
3rd place, bronze medalist(s)	Mark Howard	Ireland	21.00	
4	Johan Engberg	Sweden	21.06	
5	Steffen Otto	Germany	21.10	
6	Jonathan Barbour	United Kingdom	21.10	
7	Tobias Unger	Germany	21.20	
8	Alessandro Cavallaro	Italy	21.64	

=== Heats ===
14 July
Qualified: first 2 in each heat and 2 best to the Final

==== Heat 1 ====
Wind: -1.4 m/s

Rank	Name	Nationality	Time	Notes
1	Tobias Unger	Germany	21.21	Q
2	Johan Engberg	Sweden	21.23	Q
3	Jiří Vojtík	Czech Republic	21.36	
4	Joshua Gnoan	France	21.38	
5	Antony Ferro	Belgium	22.14	
6	Alberto Dorrego	Spain	22.30	

==== Heat 2 ====
Wind: -0.9 m/s

Rank	Name	Nationality	Time	Notes
1	Marcin Jędrusiński	Poland	20.93	Q
2	Mark Howard	Ireland	20.99	Q
3	Steffen Otto	Germany	21.18	q
4	Jonathan Barbour	United Kingdom	21.24	q
5	Massimiliano Donati	Italy	21.25	
6	Dave Caethoven	Belgium	21.58	

==== Heat 3 ====
Wind: -1.0 m/s

Rank	Name	Nationality	Time	Notes
1	Łukasz Chyła	Poland	21.11	Q
2	Alessandro Cavallaro	Italy	21.29	Q
3	Matic Osovnikar	Slovenia	21.41	
4	Marc Schneeberger	Switzerland	21.46	
5	Tobias Pfennig	Germany	21.51	

== Participation ==
According to an unofficial count, 17 athletes from 12 countries participated in the event.

- Belgium (2)
- Czech Republic (1)
- France (1)
- Germany (3)
- Ireland (1)
- Italy (2)
- Poland (2)
- Slovenia (1)
- Spain (1)
- Sweden (1)
- Switzerland (1)
- United Kingdom (1)
