= Etalemahu Kidane =

Ethiopian long-distance runner

Medal record

Women's athletics

Representing Ethiopia

African Championships
Gold medal – first place	2004 Brazzaville	5000 m

Etalemahu Kidane (born 14 February 1983 in Arssi) is an Ethiopian long-distance runner who specializes in the 3000 metres.

She won the Belfast International Cross Country three times consecutively between 2005 and 2007.

== International competitions ==
Year	Competition	Venue	Position	Event	Notes
Representing Ethiopia
2000	World Junior Championships	Santiago, Chile	3rd	3000 m	9:11.55
2002	World Junior Championships	Kingston, Jamaica	14th	3000 m	9:36.83
2004	African Championships	Brazzaville, Congo	1st	5000 m	16:25.83
2006	World Cross Country Championships	Fukuoka, Japan	13th	Short race (4 km)	13:13

== Personal bests ==
- 3000 metres - 8:54.83 min (2003)
- 5000 metres - 15:04.34 min (2004)
