= Mariusz Latkowski =

Polish bobsledder

Personal information
- Nationality: Polish
- Born: 2 March 1982 (age 44) Warsaw, Poland
- Height: 1.80 m (5 ft 11 in)

Sport
- Sport: Bobsleigh; Athletics
- Club: Śnieżka Karpacz
Medal record
Men's athletics
Representing Poland
European U20 Championships
Silver medal – second place	1999 Riga	4 × 100 m relay
Bronze medal – third place	2001 Grosseto	4 × 100 m relay

Mariusz Latkowski (born 2 March 1982) is a Polish bobsledder and sprinter.

As an athlete, he made his international championship debut at the 1999 World Youth Championships, reaching the semi-final of the 100 metres and not finishing the 4 × 100 metres relay. The next month he won a silver medal in the 4 × 100 m relay at the 1999 European Junior Championships. The Polish team again failed to finish the relay race at the 2000 World Junior Championships, and Latkowski was eliminated in the quarter-final of the 100 metres.

Having won two bronze medals at the 2000 Polish Junior Championships, Latkowski became Polish indoor junior champion in 2001 before taking silver and bronze at the 2001 Polish Junior Championships. At the 2001 European Junior Championships he won relay bronze and competed in the 100 metres. His lifetime bests were 10.57 in the 100 metres and 21.58 seconds in the 200 metres, both achieved in 2000.

He competed in the four man bobsleigh event at the 2006 Winter Olympics, where the Polish team finished 15th. At the 2006 Olympics, Latkowski defending the Italian organizing committee's accommodations for athletes amidst controversy over bland foods, saying, "I think the food is good, especially the Chinese food [...] But I'm sad there isn't a McDonalds here."
