= 2001 European Athletics Junior Championships =

- Dates: 19 – 22 July
- Host city: Grosseto, Italy
- Venue: Stadio Olimpico Carlo Zecchini
- Level: Under-20
- Events: 44
- Records set: 5 Championship records

The 2001 European Athletics Junior Championships was an athletics competition for athletes under-20 which was held at the Stadio Olimpico Carlo Zecchini in Grosseto, Italy from 19 – 22 July 2001. A total of 44 events were contested, 22 by male and 22 by female athletes. Two new events were introduced into the programme: the women's 2000 metres steeplechase and the women's 10,000 m track walk (replacing the 5000 m walk event). Five new championships records were recorded over the four-day competition, in addition to the two marks set in the newly introduced events.

Russia topped the medals table with eight golds and shared the honour of the greatest medal haul (17) with second placed Great Britain which won six gold medals. Poland came third with five golds, although fourth placed Germany had a larger medal total (15) but with one less gold medal.

Two British sprinters were nominated as the best athletes of the tournament: Vernicha James won the women's award for her 200 metres and 4×400 metres relay gold medals, as well as a 4×400 metres relay bronze. Mark Lewis-Francis took the men's award for his 100 metres gold and for anchoring the men's sprint relay to the team title. Russian Anastasiya Ilyina won the gold in the long jump and triple jump, setting a championship record in the latter event. Former Ethiopian Elvan Abeylegesse did the 3000/5000 metres double for Turkey, breaking the championship record in the 5000 m. Michał Hodun of Poland took the shot put and discus gold medals, while Belgian athlete Kevin Rans completed an unusual silver medal double at the competition in the 200 m and the pole vault.

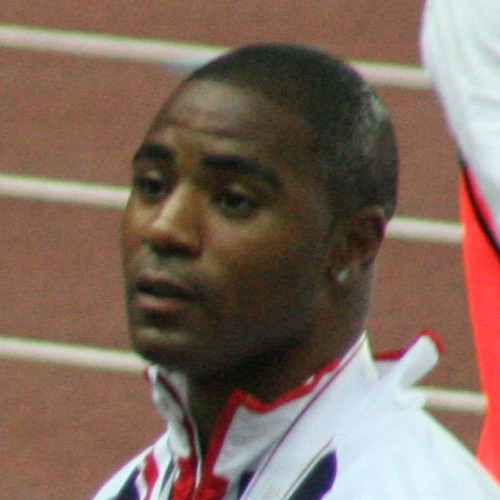
Mark Lewis-Francis won the 100 m and helped set a new relay record.

Among the athletes who won medals at the competition were Carolina Klüft, Yelena Isinbayeva and Andreas Thorkildsen – all of whom went on to become 2004 Olympic gold medallists. Elvan Abeylegesse, Anna Chicherova and Marian Oprea also went on to win Olympic medals. The decathlon junior champion Ladji Doucouré successfully changed focus to the 110 metres hurdles, becoming the 2005 World Champion.

== Records ==
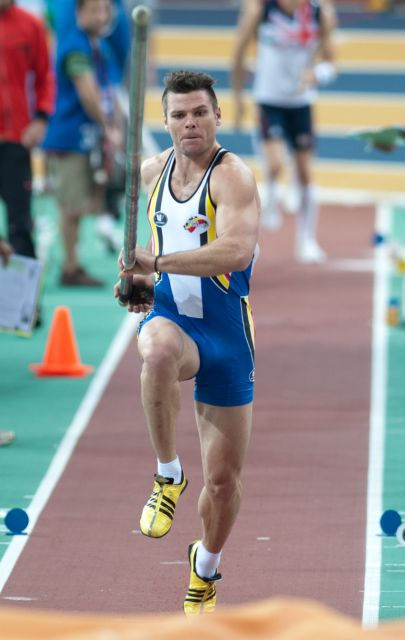
Kevin Rans won Belgium's only medals with silvers in the 200 m and pole vault.

Name	Event	Country	Record	Type
Alexandr Ivanov	Men's javelin throw	Russia	80.18	CR
Tyrone Edgar; Dwayne Grant; Tim Benjamin; Mark Lewis-Francis	Men's 4×100 metres relay	United Kingdom	39.24	CR
Elvan Abeylegesse	Women's 5000 metres	Turkey	15:21.12	CR
Anastasiya Ilyina	Women's triple jump	Russia	14.12	CR
Yelena Isinbayeva	Women's pole vault	Russia	4.40	CR
Key:WR — World record • AR — Area record • CR — Championship record • NR — National record

== Medal summary ==
=== Men ===
Event	Gold		Silver		Bronze	
100 m (wind: 2.4 m/s)	Mark Lewis-Francis (GBR)	10.09	Tim Göbel (GER)	10.18	Igor Blažević (CRO)	10.31
200 m	Ronald Pognon (FRA)	20.80	Kevin Rans (BEL)	20.89	Dwayne Grant (GBR)	20.92
400 m	Tim Benjamin (GBR)	46.43	Johan Wissman (SWE)	46.81	Bastian Swillims (GER)	46.88
800 m	René Herms (GER)	1:46.98	Arnoud Okken (NED)	1:48.02	Ricky Soos (GBR)	1:48.43
1500 m	Cosimo Caliandro (ITA)	3:48.49	Tomasz Babiszkiewicz (POL)	3:48.66	Arturo Casado (ESP)	3:48.76
5000 m	Mo Farah (GBR)	14:09.91	Bruno Saramago (POR)	14:11.65	Noel Cutillas (ESP)	14:12.43
10,000 m	Vasyl Matviychuk (UKR)	30:43.19	Aliaksandr Nikalayuk (BLR)	30:46.37	Abdulrahman Kara (TUR)	31:00.36
110 m hurdles	Philip Nossmy (SWE)	13.81	Sebastian Siebert (GER)	13.83	Dominic Girdler (GBR)	14.16
400 m hurdles	Christian Duma (GER)	50.26	Henning Hackelbusch (GER)	50.76	Mikhail Lipski (RUS)	51.00
3000 m steeplechase	Radosław Popławski (POL)	8:46.36	Mircea Bogdan (ROM)	8:49.76	Hristóforos Meroúsis (GRE)	8:51.87
4 × 100 metres relay	Great Britain; Tyrone Edgar; Dwayne Grant; Timothy Benjamin; Mark Lewis-Francis	39.24 CR	France; Steve Bonvard; Ronald Pognon; Xavier Guillaume; Ladji Doucouré	39.76	Poland; Mariusz Latkowski; Marcin Świerczyński; Krzysztof Koczoń; Paweł Ptak	39.96
4 × 400 metres relay	Poland; Marcin Marciniszyn; Michał Matyjaszczyk; Piotr Kędzia; Karol Grzegorczyk	3:06.12	United Kingdom; Robert Tobin; Russell Nicholls; Sam Ellis; Tim Benjamin	3:06.21	Spain; David Melo; Diego Ruiz; Jairo Vera; Jorge Artal	3:07.47
10,000 m walk	Yevgeniy Demkov (RUS)	43:34.12	Sergei Lystov (RUS)	43:39.46	Benjamin Kuciński (POL)	43:44.87
High jump	Andrei Chubsa (BLR)	2.23 m	Jiri Krehula (CZE)	2.21 m	Mickael Hanany (FRA)	2.19 m
Pole vault	Dmitriy Kuptsov (RUS)	5.55 m	Kevin Rans (BEL)	5.50 m	Stauros Kouroupacis (GRE)	5.35 m
Long jump	Louis Tsatoumas (GRE)	7.98 m (w)	Jan Zumer (SLO)	7.72 m (w)	Dmitri Sapinski (RUS)	7.72 m
Triple jump	Marian Oprea (ROM)	16.65 m	Jonathan Moore (GBR)	16.43 m	Viktor Yastrebov (UKR)	16.43 m
Shot put	Michał Hodun (POL)	18.23 m	Robert Häggblom (FIN)	17.96 m	Marco Fortes (POR)	17.86 m
Discus throw	Michał Hodun (POL)	57.95 m	Arnost Holovsky (CZE)	54.46 m	Dzmitry Sivakou (BLR)	54.23 m
Hammer throw	Krisztián Pars (HUN)	69.42 m	Alexei Elisseev (RUS)	68.32 m	Eşref Apak (TUR)	67.56 m
Javelin throw	Alexandr Ivanov (RUS)	80.18 m CR	Andreas Thorkildsen (NOR)	76.98 m	Saku Kuusisto (FIN)	76.98 m
Decathlon	Ladji Doucouré (FRA)	7747 pts	Lars Albert (GER)	7683 pts	Atis Vaisjuns (LAT)	7497 pts

=== Women ===
Event	Gold		Silver		Bronze	
100 metres (wind: 2.1 m/s)	Katchi Habel (GER)	11.24 w	Gwladys Belliard (FRA)	11.50 w	Amélie Huyghes (FRA)	11.59 w
200 metres	Vernicha James (GBR)	22.93	Katchi Habel (GER)	23.38	Maja Nose (SLO)	23.60
400 metres	Tatyana Firova (RUS)	52.94	Lisa Miller (GBR)	53.29	Kim Wall (GBR)	53.52
800 metres	Lucia Klocová (SVK)	2:03.76	Kerstin Werner (GER)	2:03.99	Tetyana Petlyuk (UKR)	2:04.15
1500 metres	Ljiljana Ćulibrk (CRO)	4:13.13	Emma Ward (GBR)	4:13.51	Riina Tolonen (FIN)	4:14.48
3000 metres	Elvan Abeylegesse (TUR)	8:53.42	Tatyana Chulakh (RUS)	9:02.64	Ulla Tuimala (FIN)	9:07.35
5000 metres	Elvan Abeylegesse (TUR)	15:21.12 CR	Elina Lindgren (FIN)	16:11.55	Collette Fagan (GBR)	16:16.39
100 metres hurdles (wind: 2.1 m/s)	Gergana Stoyanova (BUL)	13.04 w	Adrianna Lamalle (FRA)	13.08 w	Lucie Škrobáková (CZE)	13.30 w
400 metres hurdles	Zofia Małachowska (POL)	57.78	Patrícia Lopes (POR)	57.93	Mariya Menshikova (RUS)	58.83
2000 metres steeplechase	Catalina Oprea (ROM)	6:34.89	Gwendoline Després (FRA)	6:36.06	Antje Hoffmann (GER)	6:36.67
4 × 100 metres relay	Germany (GER); Nadine Hentschke; Christa Kaufmann; Kerstin Grötzinger; Katchi Habel	44.16	France (FRA); Amélie Huyghes; Cecile Sellier; Gwladys Belliard; Adriana Lamalle	44.37	Great Britain (GBR); Danielle Norville; Eleanor Caney; Amy Spencer; Vernicha James	44.66
4 × 400 metres relay	Great Britain (GBR); Kim Wall; Olivia Hines; Vernicha James; Lisa Miller	3:34.63	Germany (GER); Eileen Müller; Claudia Hoffmann; Nadine Balkow; Larissa Kettenis	3:36.20	Romania (ROM); Diana Koroszi; Liliana Barbulescu; Norica Manafu; Maria Rus	3:41.12
10,000 m track walk	Tatyana Kozlova (RUS)	46:22.67	Athanasia Tsoumeleka (GRE)	46:29.20	Beatriz Pascual (ESP)	46:49.81
High jump	Ramona Pop (ROM)	1.92 m	Anna Chicherova (RUS)	1.90 m	Anna Ksok (POL)	1.90 m
Pole vault	Yelena Isinbayeva (RUS)	4.40 m CR	Natalya Kushch (UKR)	4.15 m	Vanessa Boslak (FRA)	4.15 m
Long jump	Anastasiya Ilyina (RUS)	6.38 m	Alina Militaru (ROM)	6.32 m	Katarzyna Klisowska (POL)	6.26 m
Triple jump	Anastasiya Ilyina (RUS)	14.12 m CR	Athanasia Perra (GRE)	13.73 m (w)	Viktoriya Gurova (RUS)	13.68 m
Shot put	Natalya Khoroneko (BLR)	16.92 m	Kristin Marten (GER)	16.02 m	Claudia Villeneuve (FRA)	15.82 m
Discus throw	Natalya Fokina (UKR)	56.69 m	Vera Begić (CRO)	55.02 m	Olga Chernogorova (BLR)	54.49 m
Hammer throw	Ivana Brkljačić (CRO)	64.18 m	Martina Danišová (SVK)	61.97 m	Berta Castells (ESP)	61.04 m
Javelin throw	Halina Kakhava (BLR)	55.40 m	Goldie Sayers (GBR)	55.40 m	Marion Bonaudo (FRA)	53.71 m
Heptathlon	Carolina Klüft (SWE)	6022 pts	Maren Freisen (GER)	5956 pts	Olga Karas (RUS)	5745 pts

== Medal table ==
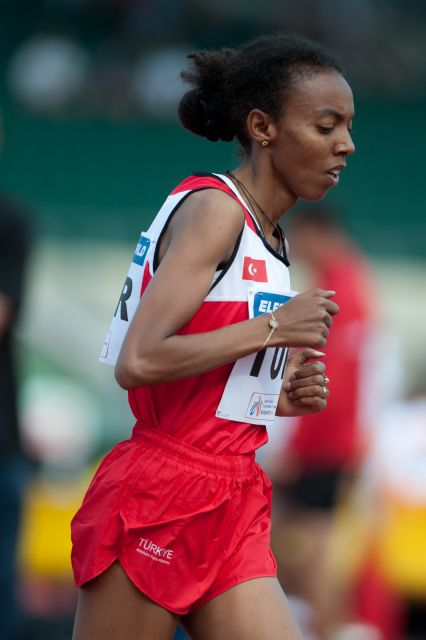
Elvan Abeylegesse helped Turkey with her 3000/5000 m wins.

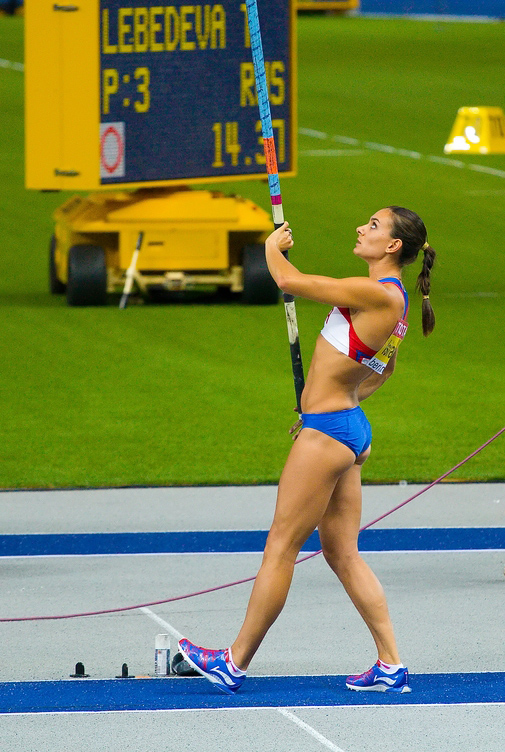
Yelena Isinbayeva set a championship record in the pole vault.

Key

The host country is highlighted in lavender blue

Rank	Nation	Gold	Silver	Bronze	Total
1	Russia	8	4	5	17
2	Great Britain	6	5	6	17
3	Poland	5	1	4	10
4	Germany	4	9	2	15
5	Romania	3	2	1	6
6	Belarus	3	1	2	6
7	France	2	5	5	12
8	Ukraine	2	1	2	5
9	Croatia	2	1	1	4
10	Sweden	2	1	0	3
11	Turkey	2	0	2	4
12	Greece	1	2	2	5
13	Slovakia	1	1	0	2
14	Bulgaria	1	0	0	1
14	Hungary	1	0	0	1
14	Italy*	1	0	0	1
17	Finland	0	2	3	5
18	Czech Republic	0	2	1	3
18	Portugal	0	2	1	3
20	Belgium	0	2	0	2
21	Slovenia	0	1	1	2
22	Netherlands	0	1	0	1
22	Norway	0	1	0	1
24	Spain	0	0	5	5
25	Latvia	0	0	1	1
Totals (25 entries)		44	44	44	132

== See also ==
- 2001 in athletics (track and field)
