= Beatrice Jepchumba =

Kenyan runner

Beatrice Jepchumba (born 25 November 1983, in Nandi Hills) is a Kenyan runner.

== Competition record ==
Year	Competition	Venue	Position	Event	Notes
Representing Kenya
2000	World Junior Championships	Santiago, Chile	1st	3000 m	9:08.80
2005	World Cross Country Championships	Saint-Étienne, France	7th	Short race (4.196 km)	13:31
2005	World Cross Country Championships	Saint-Étienne, France	2nd	Team	19 pts
2006	World Cross Country Championships	Fukuoka, Japan	6th	Short race (4 km)	12:58
2006	World Cross Country Championships	Fukuoka, Japan	2nd	Team	26 pts
2006	African Championships	Bambous, Mauritius	7th	1500 m	4:29.99

=== Personal bests ===
- 1500 metres - 4:04.08 min (2006)
- 3000 metres - 8:35.07 min (2001)
- 3000 metres steeplechase - 10:11.5 min (2005)
- 5000 metres - 14:52.08 min (2006)
