= Mika Yoshikawa =

Japanese runner (born 1984)

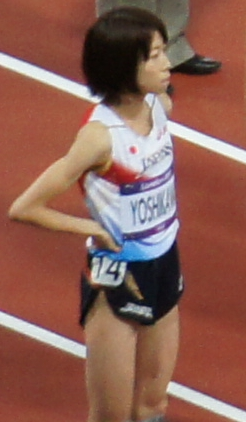
Mika Yoshikawa at the 2012 Summer Olympics

Mika Yoshikawa (吉川美香, Yoshikawa Mika; born 16 September 1984) is a Japanese middle- and long-distance runner. She is a five-time national champion over 1500 metres and won the 2012 Japanese title over 10,000 metres. She has represented Japan at the Olympics, World Championships in Athletics, the Asian Athletics Championships, and the Asian Games.

== Career ==
Born in Sagamihara, she attended Kanagawa Prefectural Asamizodai High School and competed in the 1500 metres as a teenager. A small and light runner – 1.55 m tall (5 ft 1 in) and 39 kg in weight (86 lbs) – she made her first appearance at the Japan Championships in Athletics in 2005, finishing fourth in the 1500 m final. She broke through at the senior level the following year, winning the Japanese title, running at the World Cross Country Short Race and placing seventh at the 2006 Asian Games.

Yoshikawa maintained her position as the top Japanese 1500 m runner by winning a second national title in 2007. She was fourth at the 2007 Asian Athletics Championships and for the first time she represented Japan at the World Championships in Athletics, held in Osaka. She won three further national titles from 2008 to 2010, but did not achieve the qualifying standards for the 2008 Beijing Olympics or the 2009 World Championships in Athletics. She did race regionally however, finishing seventh at the 2009 Asian Athletics Championships and sixth at the 2010 Asian Games. At the 2010 Japanese National Games (Kokutai) she won with a season's best run of 4:12.38 minutes.

Having reached a plateau in her middle distance career, she changed her focus to running over longer distances from 2011 onwards. She had a best of 71:13 minutes on her half marathon debut at the Marugame Half Marathon and set a 5000 metres best of 15:31.78 minutes on the track to take second at the Japanese Corporate Championships. Her transition to long-distance proved successful in the 2012 season. She significantly improved her 10,000 metres personal best to 31:28.71 minutes in her win at the Japanese Championships, beating the more favoured Kayoko Fukushi and gaining selection for Japan at the 2012 Summer Olympics. Here, she finished sixteenth in the 10,000 metres race, but was knocked out in the heats of the 5000 metres race. She ran the final leg of the 2013 Inter-Prefectural Women's Ekiden and helped Kanagawa Prefecture to a new course record.

Her personal best times are 4:10.00 minutes in the 1500 metres, achieved in May 2007 in Osaka; 9:02.71 minutes in the 3000 metres, achieved in June 2011 in Abashiri; 15:28.44 minutes in the 5000 metres, achieved at the 2012 Olympics in London; 31:28.71 minutes in the 10,000 metres, achieved in June 2012 in Osaka; and 71:13 minutes in the half marathon, achieved in February 2011 in Marugame.
