= Veronica Campbell Brown =

Jamaican sprinter (born 1982)

Veronica Campbell Brown CD
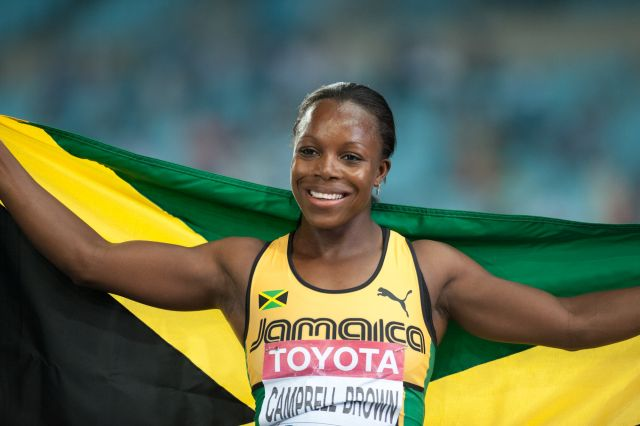
- Veronica Campbell Brown at the 2011 World Championships

Personal information
- Born: Veronica Campbell; 15 May 1982 (age 44) Clarks Town, Trelawny, Jamaica
- Height: 1.68 m (5 ft 6 in)
- Weight: 61 kg (134 lb)
- Spouse: Omar Brown (m. 2007)

Sport
- Sport: Track and Field
- Event: Sprints
- College team: Arkansas Razorbacks
- Club: Pure Athletics
- Coached by: Lance Brauman
Medal record
Women's Athletics
Representing Jamaica
Event	1st	2nd	3rd
Olympic Games	3	3	2
World Championships	3	7	1
Commonwealth Games	1	4	0
World Indoor Championships	2	0	0
Continental Cup	2	0	0
World Athletics Final	3	1	0
World Relay Championships	1	1	0
World Junior Championships	2	1	0
CAC Junior Championships	4	0	0
Carifta Games	6	1	1
Olympic Games
Gold medal – first place	2004 Athens	200 m
Gold medal – first place	2004 Athens	4 × 100 m relay
Gold medal – first place	2008 Beijing	200 m
Silver medal – second place	2000 Sydney	4 × 100 m relay
Silver medal – second place	2012 London	4 × 100 m relay
Silver medal – second place	2016 Rio de Janeiro	4 × 100 m relay
Bronze medal – third place	2004 Athens	100 m
Bronze medal – third place	2012 London	100 m
World Championships
Gold medal – first place	2007 Osaka	100 m
Gold medal – first place	2011 Daegu	200 m
Gold medal – first place	2015 Beijing	4 × 100 m relay
Silver medal – second place	2005 Helsinki	100 m
Silver medal – second place	2005 Helsinki	4 × 100 m relay
Silver medal – second place	2007 Osaka	200 m
Silver medal – second place	2007 Osaka	4 × 100 m relay
Silver medal – second place	2009 Berlin	200 m
Silver medal – second place	2011 Daegu	100 m
Silver medal – second place	2011 Daegu	4 × 100 m relay
Bronze medal – third place	2015 Beijing	200 m
Commonwealth Games
Gold medal – first place	2014 Glasgow	4 × 100 m relay
Silver medal – second place	2002 Manchester	100 m
Silver medal – second place	2002 Manchester	4 × 100 m relay
Silver medal – second place	2006 Melbourne	200 m
Silver medal – second place	2014 Glasgow	100 m
World Indoor Championships
Gold medal – first place	2010 Doha	60 m
Gold medal – first place	2012 Istanbul	60 m
Continental Cup
Gold medal – first place	2014 Marrakesh	100 m
Gold medal – first place	2014 Marrakesh	4 × 100 m relay
Representing Americas
World Athletics Final
Gold medal – first place	2004 Monaco	100 m
Gold medal – first place	2004 Monaco	200 m
Gold medal – first place	2005 Monaco	100 m
Silver medal – second place	2005 Monaco	200 m
World Relay Championships
Gold medal – first place	2015 Nassau	4 × 100 m relay
Silver medal – second place	2015 Nassau	4 × 200 m relay
World Junior Championships
Gold medal – first place	2000 Santiago	100 m
Gold medal – first place	2000 Santiago	200 m
Silver medal – second place	2000 Santiago	4 × 100 m relay
CAC Championships
Gold medal – first place	1998 George Town	100 m
Gold medal – first place	1998 George Town	4 × 100 m relay
Gold medal – first place	2000 San Juan	100 m
Gold medal – first place	2000 San Juan	4 × 100 m relay
Carifta Games
Gold medal – first place	1997 Bridgetown	4 × 100 m relay
Gold medal – first place	2000 St. George's	200 m
Gold medal – first place	2000 St. George's	4 × 100 m relay
Gold medal – first place	2001 Bridgetown	100 m
Gold medal – first place	2001 Bridgetown	200 m
Gold medal – first place	2001 Bridgetown	4 × 100 m relay
Silver medal – second place	2000 St. Georges's	100 m
Bronze medal – third place	1999 Fort-de-France	200 m
World Youth Championships
Gold medal – first place	1999 Bydgoszcz	100 m
Gold medal – first place	1999 Bydgoszcz	4 × 100 m relay

Veronica Campbell Brown CD (née Campbell; born 15 May 1982) is a Jamaican retired track and field sprinter, who specialized in the 100 and 200 meters. An eight-time Olympic medalist, she is the second of three women in history to win two consecutive Olympic 200 m gold medals, after Bärbel Wöckel of Germany and compatriot Elaine Thompson-Herah. Campbell-Brown is one of only eleven athletes to win World Championship titles at the youth, junior, and senior levels of an athletic event.

She holds personal bests of 10.76 seconds for the 100 m and 21.74 seconds for the 200 m. She was the 100 m gold medallist at the 2007 World Championships in Athletics and the 200 m gold medallist at the 2011 World Championships in Athletics. She has also won seven silver medals and one bronze medal in her career at the World Championships in Athletics. Over 60 metres, she is a two-time champion at the IAAF World Indoor Championships.

== Early life ==
Campbell was born to Cecil Campbell and Pamela Bailey in Clarks Town, Trelawny, Jamaica, on 15 May 1982. She has five brothers and four sisters and attended Troy Primary and Vere Technical High School in Clarendon before pursuing higher education in the United States at the University of Arkansas.

== Junior career ==
In 1999, she won two gold medals, the 100 m and 4 × 100 m relay at the inaugural IAAF World Youth Championships. The following year, she became the first female to win the sprint double at the IAAF World Junior Championships. She took the 100 m in 11.12 s (which was a championship record at the time) and the 200 m in 22.87 s. At the 2000 Olympic Games, she ran the second leg on the silver medal winning 4 × 100 m relay team. In 2001, she was awarded the Austin Sealy Trophy for the most outstanding athlete of the 2001 CARIFTA Games. That year, she won 3 gold medals (100 m, 200 m, and 4 × 100 m relay) in the junior (U-20) category.

== College career ==
Campbell attended Barton County Community College in Great Bend, Kansas, where she set several records and won many titles, including four national junior college titles in the 60, 100 and 200 metres both indoors and outdoors. She holds the current record for Barton County CC in the outdoor 100 m and 200 m. Campbell also excelled academically, earning an associate degree from Barton County in 2002 with a 3.8 grade average. She later attended the University of Arkansas, where she stood out as a sprint star in a programme dominated by long-distance runners.

== Professional career ==
At 18 years old, Campbell-Brown won her first Olympic medal. She competed at the 2000 Summer Olympics in the 4 × 100m relay along with Tayna Lawrence, Beverly McDonald, Merlene Frazer and sprint veteran and Olympic legend, Merlene Ottey where the team finished second in the finals in a time of 42.13 seconds behind Caribbean neighbors, Bahamas. Campbell Brown had shown herself to be a promising athlete as a junior, having won at the junior level and at Jamaica's yearly Boys and Girls Championship for her high school, Vere Technical High. The Championship has been credited as the engineer behind Jamaica's success on the Track and Field World stage.

At the age of 22, Campbell-Brown represented Jamaica at the 2004 Athens Olympics. She competed in both the 100 m and 200 m. In the finals of the 100 m, she placed third. Campbell Brown later competed in the 200 m finals, a race American Allyson Felix was favored to win. VCB went on to decimate the field in the 200 m finals. She ran a blistering curve and held her form down the final stretch to become the first Jamaican and Caribbean woman in the history of the Olympic games to win a sprint Olympic title. A visibly emotional Campbell Brown was brought to tears at the medal ceremony as her national anthem was played in the stadium and flag hoisted.

Campbell-Brown then teamed up with Aleen Bailey, Tayna Lawrence, and Sherone Simpson in the finals of the 4 × 100 m. VCB ran a scintillating anchor leg as Jamaica went on to win the women's 4 × 100 m. Jamaica created history as it was the first time Jamaica had won the 4 × 100 m relay at the Olympics.

In August 2005, Campbell won the silver medal in the 100 m at the 2005 World Championships in Athletics. She won another silver medal in the 4 × 100 m relay (together with Daniele Browning, Aleen Bailey and Sherone Simpson).

At the 2007 World Championships, Campbell won three medals, a gold in the 100 m, silver in the 200 m (second to Felix) and silver in the 4 × 100 m relay.

At the 2008 Jamaican Olympic trials, she finished fourth in the 100 m, thereby missing the qualifying requirement to automatically make the Jamaican Olympic roster for that event. She clocked 10.88 s in the final, which is the second-fastest time ever for a fourth-place finish. She, however, bounced back to take the 200 m final in what was then a personal best time of 21.94 s. Having failed to qualify for the 100 m, she only competed in the 200 m and the 4 × 100 m relay at the Olympic Games.

At the opening ceremony of the 2008 Olympics, Veronica Campbell-Brown carried the Jamaican flag during the Athletes' Parade. She successfully defended her Olympic 200 m title in a new personal best time of 21.74 s. She competed at the 4 × 100 m relay together with Shelly-Ann Fraser, Sheri-Ann Brooks and Aleen Bailey. In the first round heats, Jamaica placed first in front of Russia, Germany and China. The Jamaican teams' time of 42.24 s was the first time overall out of sixteen participating nations. With this result, Jamaica qualified for the final, replacing Brooks and Bailey with Sherone Simpson and Kerron Stewart. Jamaica did not finish the race due to a mistake in the baton exchange.

At the end of the 2008 season, Campbell-Brown was selected the top 200 m runner in the world and the fourth best in the 100 m (following three other Jamaicans) by Track and Field News. She also finished eighth overall in voting for the magazine's Woman of the Year.

She qualified for her third World Championships by winning the 200 m national title. She beat runners-up Shelly Ann Fraser and Simone Facey with a time of 22.40 seconds in June 2009, although a toe injury had left her lacking full fitness.

At the 2009 World Championships Campbell-Brown was fourth in the 100 m final behind teammates Fraser and Stewart. She then won her second World 200 m silver behind American Allyson Felix. She closed the season at the Shanghai Golden Grand Prix, recording her fastest of the year (10.89) to take second behind Carmelita Jeter, who became the second fastest ever with 10.64 seconds. Although Jeter beat her, Campbell-Brown was the fourth fastest 100 m sprinter overall that season.

In 2010, she won her first World Indoor 60 m gold medal in a time of 7.00. She later ran the fastest time for the 200 m in 21.98 in New York. She also ran a 10.78 in Eugene, Oregon, beating Fraser-Pryce and Jeter.

In 2011 Veronica Campbell-Brown won the Jamaican athletic trials in both the 100 & 200 m and was one of the favorites for both gold medals at the World Championships in Daegu. At the championships, she won the silver medal in the women's 100 m in 10.98 behind Jeter, who won in 10.90. She later won her first 200 m world title in a timer of 22.22, beating Jeter and Felix, who were second and third, respectively. In 2015, Campbell made it to the Semi and Finals of the World Championships 100 and 200 m, Finishing 3rd in the 200 m, which Dafne Schippers won.

In 2012, she defended her 60 m World Indoor Gold medal, which she won in a time of 7.01. Later in June, Veronica qualified for the 2012 Olympic Games in London, both at 100 m and 200 m. In the 100 m she came third behind Shelly Ann Fraser Pryce and Carmelita Jeter. In the 200 m she finished just outside the medals in 4th place, 0.24 of a second outside of bronze. In the 4 × 100 m relay final, she and the Jamaican team came second behind the U.S., which won in a new world record of 40.82 s.

In 2014, Campbell-Brown competed at the 2014 World Indoor Championships in Sopot, Poland, and over the 60 m race, ending up in 5th place with a time of 7.13 s. In 2015, she competed at the 2015 World Championships in Athletics in Beijing, China, and participated in sprint events of 100 m, 200 m, and 4 × 100 m relay—where she finished in fourth place with a time of 10.91 s, won the bronze medal with a time of 21.97 s and secured the gold with a time of 41.07 s respectively.

Campbell-Brown also qualified for the 2016 Rio Olympics in the 200 m and 4 × 100 m relay. In the 200 m, she did not make it out of the heats and finished in 27th place with a time of 22.97 s but won the silver as part of the Jamaican team in the 4 × 100 m relay with a time of 41.36 s behind the US team, which finished with a time of 41.01 s, the second fastest time ever run for the event.

== Positive doping test ==
On 14 June 2013, it was reported that Campbell-Brown had tested positive for diuretics while competing at the JAAA Supreme Ventures, a Jamaican meet. She was provisionally suspended from competition. Campbell-Brown denied that she had intentionally taken any banned substances.

On 2 October 2013, she was cleared by the Jamaica Athletics Administrative Association (JAAA) to resume competition. The panel said this is not one of the most serious offences, and it was appropriate that she should be given a public warning with no ban from competition. They deemed she did not use the prohibited substance for performance enhancement. The substance in question—Lasix, not necessarily a performance-enhancing drug, but rather a potential masking agent for other banned substances—was contained in a cream the athlete had used for a leg injury.

The International Association of Athletics Federations appealed this decision at the Court of Arbitration for Sport. The court decided to clear Campbell-Brown of all doping charges as the JAAA doping procedures did not comply with required international standards.

== Personal life ==
In 2007, Campbell married Omar Brown, a fellow Jamaican sprinter and University of Arkansas alumnus, changing her name to Campbell-Brown, a few years later she dropped the hyphen from her name, changing it to Campbell Brown. They currently live and train in Clermont, Florida. She was appointed as a UNESCO Goodwill Ambassador in late 2009 and stated that she would use the role to promote gender equity in sport.

== Achievements ==
Campbell-Brown's personal best of 10.76 s in the 100 m ranks her all-time top fifteen in the world (tied for 11th place) and sixth among Jamaican women. Her 200 m best (21.74 s) ranks her in the all-time top fifteen in the world. This time is the fifth best among Jamaican women. It is the tied sixth fastest time of the 21st century and was the fastest since Marion Jones's 21.62 s in Johannesburg 1998. She earned a total of 46 medals (27 gold, 16 silver, 3 bronze).

=== Personal bests ===
Event	Time (seconds)	Venue	Date	Remarks
60 metres	7.00	Doha, Qatar	14 March 2010	
100 yards	9.91+	Ostrava, Czech Republic	31 May 2011	Official World Best
100 metres	10.76	Ostrava, Czech Republic	31 May 2011	
200 metres	21.74	Beijing, China	21 August 2008	
400 metres	52.24	Fayetteville, United States	22 January 2005	

+ = en route to a longer distance

- All information from IAAF Profile

=== Competition record ===
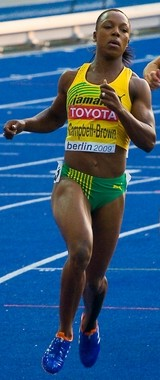
Veronica Campbell Brown at the 2009 World Championships

Year	Competition	Venue	Position	Event	Notes
Representing Jamaica
1996	CAC Junior Championships (U-17)	San Salvador, El Salvador	1st	4 × 100 m relay	46.31
1997	CARIFTA Games (U-20)	Bridgetown, Barbados	1st	4 × 100 m relay	45.27
1998	CAC Junior Championships (U-17)	George Town, Cayman Islands	1st	100 m	11.72 w (2.4 m/s)
1998	CAC Junior Championships (U-17)	George Town, Cayman Islands	1st	4 × 100 m relay	45.35
1998	World Junior Championships	Annecy, France	17th (qf)	100 m	12.04 (wind: -0.7 m/s)
1999	CARIFTA Games (U-20)	Fort-de-France, Martinique	3rd	200 m	23.84 (1.6 m/s)
1999	World Youth Championships	Bydgoszcz, Poland	1st	100 m	11.49
2000	CARIFTA Games (U-20)	St. George's, Grenada	2nd	100 m	11.41
2000	CARIFTA Games (U-20)	St. George's, Grenada	1st	200 m	23.05 (1.2 m/s) CR
2000	CARIFTA Games (U-20)	St. George's, Grenada	1st	4 × 100 m relay	44.63
2000	World Junior Championships	Santiago, Chile	1st	100 m	11.12 (wind: +2.0 m/s)
2000	World Junior Championships	Santiago, Chile	1st	200 m	22.87 (wind: +0.7 m/s)
2000	World Junior Championships	Santiago, Chile	2nd	4 × 100 m relay	44.05
2000	Olympic Games	Sydney, Australia	2nd	4 × 100 m relay	42.13
2001	CARIFTA Games (U-20)	Bridgetown, Barbados	1st	100 m	11.32 (0.0 m/s)
2001	CARIFTA Games (U-20)	Bridgetown, Barbados	1st	200 m	22.93 (−1.6 m/s) CR
2001	CARIFTA Games (U-20)	Bridgetown, Barbados	1st	4 × 100 m relay	44.96
2002	Commonwealth Games	Manchester, United Kingdom	2nd	100 m	11.00 (1.5 m/s)
2002	Commonwealth Games	Manchester, United Kingdom	2nd	4 × 100 m relay	42.73
2004	Olympic Games	Athens, Greece	3rd	100 m	10.97
2004	Olympic Games	Athens, Greece	1st	200 m	22.05
2004	Olympic Games	Athens, Greece	1st	4 × 100 m relay	41.73 NR
2004	World Athletics Final	Monaco, Monaco	1st	100 m	10.91
2004	World Athletics Final	Monaco, Monaco	1st	200 m	22.64
2005	World Championships	Helsinki, Finland	2nd	100 m	10.95
2005	World Championships	Helsinki, Finland	4th	200 m	22.38
2005	World Championships	Helsinki, Finland	2nd	4 × 100 m relay	41.99
2005	World Athletics Final	Monaco, Monaco	1st	100 m	10.92
2005	World Athletics Final	Monaco, Monaco	2nd	200 m	22.37
2006	Commonwealth Games	Melbourne, Australia	2nd	200 m	22.72
2007	World Championships	Osaka, Japan	1st	100 m	11.01
2007	World Championships	Osaka, Japan	2nd	200 m	22.34
2007	World Championships	Osaka, Japan	2nd	4 × 100 m relay	42.01
2008	Olympic Games	Beijing, China	1st	200 m	21.74 (0.6 m/s)
2008	Olympic Games	Beijing, China	DNF	4 × 100 m relay	
2009	World Championships	Berlin, Germany	4th	100 m	10.95
2009	World Championships	Berlin, Germany	2nd	200 m	22.35
2010	World Indoor Championships	Doha, Qatar	1st	60 m	7.00
2011	World Championships	Daegu, South Korea	2nd	100 metres	10.97 (−0.4 m/s)
2011	World Championships	Daegu, South Korea	1st	200 metres	22.22 (−1.0 m/s)
2011	World Championships	Daegu, South Korea	2nd	4 × 100 metres relay	41.70 NR
2012	World Indoor Championships	Istanbul, Turkey	1st	60 m	7.01
2012	Olympic Games	London, United Kingdom	3rd	100 metres	10.81
2012	Olympic Games	London, United Kingdom	4th	200 metres	22.38
2012	Olympic Games	London, United Kingdom	2nd	4 × 100 m relay	41.41 NR
2014	World Indoor Championships	Sopot, Poland	5th	60 m	7.13
2015	World Championships	Beijing, China	4th	100 m	10.91
2015	World Championships	Beijing, China	3rd	200 m	21.97
2015	World Championships	Beijing, China	1st	4 × 100 m relay	41.07
2016	Olympic Games	Rio de Janeiro, Brazil	27th (h)	200 m	22.97
2016	Olympic Games	Rio de Janeiro, Brazil	2nd	4 × 100 m relay	41.36

=== Honours ===
In 2008, the Jamaican government awarded Campbell Brown with the Order of Distinction, Commander Class.

Awards
Preceded by Brigitte Foster; Sherone Simpson	Jamaica Sportswoman of the Year; 2004, 2005; 2007–2011	Succeeded by Sherone Simpson; Shelly-Ann Fraser-Pryce
Achievements
Preceded by Allyson Felix; Allyson Felix; Allyson Felix	Women's 200 m Best Year Performance; 2004; 2008; 2010	Succeeded by Allyson Felix; Allyson Felix; Shalonda Solomon
Olympic Games
Preceded by Sandie Richards	Flagbearer for Jamaica; Beijing 2008	Succeeded by Errol Kerr
