= 2004 African Championships in Athletics – Women's 5000 metres =

The women's 5000 metres event at the 2004 African Championships in Athletics was held in Brazzaville, Republic of the Congo on July 14.

== Results ==
Rank	Name	Nationality	Time	Notes
1st place, gold medalist(s)	Etalemahu Kidane	Ethiopia	16:25.83	
2nd place, silver medalist(s)	Priscah Jepleting	Kenya	16:26.15	
3rd place, bronze medalist(s)	Angele Haronsimana	Burundi	16:55.99	
