= Katchi Habel =

German sprinter

Katchi Habel (born 22 October 1982) is a retired German sprinter who specialized in the 100 and 200 metres.

At the 2000 World Junior Championships she won the silver medal in the 100 metres and a gold medal in the 4 × 100 metres relay. At the 2001 European Junior Championships she won gold in the 100 metres and silver in the 200 metres.

She did not break through on senior level, but did finish fourth in the 4 x 100 metres relay at the 2002 IAAF World Cup. She became German champion in relay several times, with the club LG Olympia Dortmund. Until 2000 she represented SC Preußen Münster.

Her personal best times were 11.39 seconds in the 100 metres, achieved at the 2000 World Junior Championships in Santiago de Chile; and 23.31 seconds in the 200 metres, achieved in June 2001 in Mannheim.
