= Consuella Moore =

American track and field sprinter (born 1981)

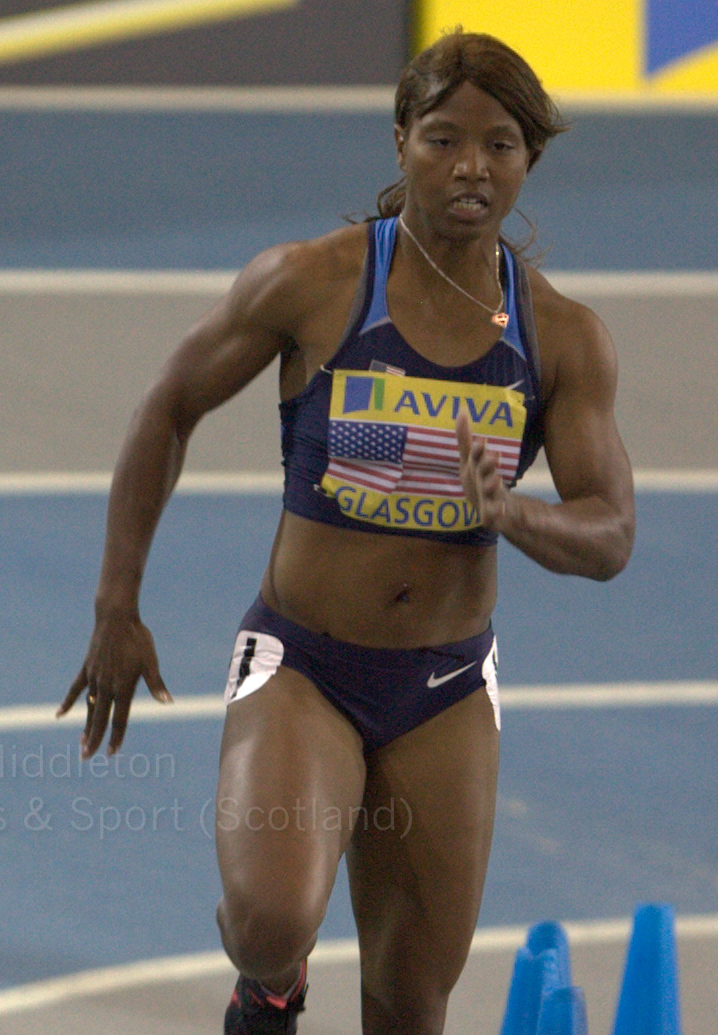
- 2011 Consuella Moore during Sainsbury's International Match

Personal information
- Born: August 29, 1981 (age 44) Chicago, Illinois, United States

Sport
- Sport: Track and field
- Club: Penn State Nittany Lions
Medal record
Women's athletics
Representing the United States
Pan American Games
Gold medal – first place	2003 Santo Domingo	4×100 m relay

Consuella "Connie" Moore (born August 29, 1981) is an American track and field sprinter who competes in the 100 and 200 meters.

Born in Chicago, Illinois, her first major outing came when she represented the United States in the 100 m at the 2000 World Junior Championships in Athletics. She began attending Penn State University in 2001 and was top three in both the 100 m and 200 m at the outdoor Big Ten Conference meet. She became the Big 10 Outdoors champion in both events in 2002 and also reached the final of the 200 m at the USA Outdoor Track and Field Championships.

In the 2003 indoor season, she came second in the 200 m at the NCAA Women's Indoor Track and Field Championship and was third at the NCAA Outdoors later that season. In her final year at Penn State she won both Outdoor Big 10 sprint events, was third in the 200 m at the NCAA Indoors and reached both sprint finals at the NCAA Outdoors. She was the athlete to win NCAA All-America honours for the Penn State Nittany Lions. She graduated with a degree in psychology in mid-2004.

Moore was chosen for the 4×100 m relay at the 2003 Pan American Games and helped the United States to the gold medal alongside Ara Towns, Allyson Felix and Angela Daigle. She ran at the 2004 United States Olympic Trials and reached the finals of the 100 and 200 m sprints. This gained her a place in the relay pool for the 2004 Athens Olympics, but ultimately she did not compete.

Her passion for the sport waned in the three years that followed and she ceased competition altogether in 2007 after a poor showing at the national championships. She had stopped enjoying the sport and often found it stressful. Discussions with Paralympic champion April Holmes and a chance meeting with Al Joyner led to Moore restarting her career in 2009. She worked under the coaching of Joyner and made her comeback at the 2010 USA Outdoor Track and Field Championships by taking her first national title in the 200 m. Her winning time of 22.40 seconds ranked her as the fourth fastest athlete that season and the second best American after Allyson Felix. She went on to represent the Americas team at the 2010 IAAF Continental Cup and she came in fourth place in the 200 m behind Cydonie Mothersille.

== See also ==
- List of Pennsylvania State University Olympians
