= Lenka Ficková =

Czech sprinter

Personal information
- Nationality: Czech
- Born: 10 January 1982 (age 43)

Sport
- Sport: Sprinting
- Event: 4 × 400 metres relay

Lenka Ficková (born 10 January 1982) is a Czech sprinter. She competed in the women's 4 × 400 metres relay at the 2000 Summer Olympics.
