= Tezeta Sürekli =

Turkish long-distance runner

Personal information
- Nationality: Turkish
- Born: 8 April 1980 (age 46)

Sport
- Sport: Long-distance running
- Event: 5000 metres

Tezeta Sürekli (born 8 April 1980) is a Turkish long-distance runner. She competed in the women's 5000 metres at the 2004 Summer Olympics.
