= Benjamin Mielke =

German bobsledder (born 1981)

Bejamin Mielke (born 6 February 1981 in Perleberg) is a German Bobsledder who has competed since 2006. His best Bobsleigh World Cup finish was third in the four-man event at Igls in January 2007.
