= Sergio Riva =

Italian bobsledder (born 1983)

Sergio Riva (born 29 March 1983) is an Italian bobsledder who has competed since 2007. He finished 17th in the two-man event at the 2010 Winter Olympics in Vancouver.

Riva competed at the FIBT World Championships 2009 in Lake Placid, New York, in the four-man event, but did not start the third run. His best World Cup finish was first in a two-man event at Lake Placid, New York, in December 2010.
