= Vernicha James =

English sprinter (born 1984)

Personal information
- Born: 6 June 1984 (age 42) London, Great Britain
- Height: 1.75 m (5 ft 9 in)

Sport
- Country: Great Britain
- Sport: Track and field
- Club: Belgrave Harriers
Medal record
Track and field
Representing Great Britain
World Junior Championships
Gold medal – first place	2002 Kingston	Women's 200 m
Silver medal – second place	2002 Kingston	Women's 4 × 400 m relay
Bronze medal – third place	2002 Kingston	Women's 4 × 100 m relay
European Junior Championships
Gold medal – first place	2001 Grosseto	Women's 200 m
Gold medal – first place	2001 Grosseto	Women's 4 × 400 m relay
Bronze medal – third place	2001 Grosseto	Women's 4 × 100 m relay
Representing England
Commonwealth Games
Bronze medal – third place	2002 Manchester	Women's 4 × 100 m relay

Vernicha James (born 6 June 1984) is a former English sprinter who competed in 100 metres, 200 metres, 4 × 100 metre relay and 4 × 400 metre relay events. She was a double European junior champion and a three-time medalist at the World Junior Championships.
