= Sina Schielke =

German sprinter

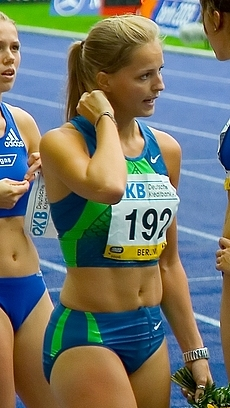
- Schielke after winning the 100 metres race at the 2006 ISTAF in Berlin

Personal information
- Full name: Sina Schielke
- Born: 19 May 1981 (age 45) Herdecke, West Germany
- Height: 1.69 m (5 ft 7 in)

Sport
- Country: Germany
- Sport: Athletics
- Events: 100 metres, 200 metres

Achievements and titles
- Personal bests: 60 metres: 7.19 (Leipzig; February 2003); 100 metres: 11.16 (Dortmund; June 2002); 200 metres: 22.78 (Mannheim; June 2001)

Sina Schielke (born 19 May 1981) is a German former sprinter. Her personal bests are 11.16 seconds in the 100 metres, 22.78 in the 200 metres, and 7.19 seconds in the indoor 60 metres.

Schielke won a silver medal in the 200 m at the 2000 World Junior Championships as well as a gold with the German 4 × 100 metres relay team. She won another medal in relay when the Germans finished second at the 2002 European Athletics Championships in Munich.
