= Fabrice Calligny =

French sprinter (born 1981)

Personal information
- Nationality: French
- Born: 7 November 1981 (age 45) Fort-de-France, Martinique
- Height: 1.81 m (5 ft 11 in)
- Weight: 78 kg (172 lb)

Sport
- Sport: Running
- Event: 100 metres
Medal record
Representing France
Men's athletics
European Championships
Bronze medal – third place	2006 Gothenburg	4x100 m relay
Representing Martinique
CARIFTA Games Junior (U20)
Silver medal – second place	1999 Fort-de-France	100m
Bronze medal – third place	1999 Fort-de-France	200m
Bronze medal – third place	2000 St. George's	200m

Fabrice Calligny (born 7 November 1981) is a French sprinter who specializes in the 100 metres.

In the 4 x 100 metres relay event he won a silver medal at the 2000 World Junior Championships, a bronze medal at the 2006 European Championships and finished seventh at the 2006 World Cup.

He competed individually at the 2001 World Championships and at the 2002 European Championships without reaching the final round.

His personal best time is 10.22 seconds, achieved in July 2002 in Saint-Étienne.
