= 2000 World Junior Championships in Athletics =

- Host city: Santiago, Chile
- Nations: 151
- Athletes: 1122
- Events: 43
- Dates: 17–22 October
- Main venue: Estadio Nacional Julio Martínez Prádanos

The 2000 World Junior Championships in Athletics were held in Santiago, Chile between 17 and 22 October 2000.

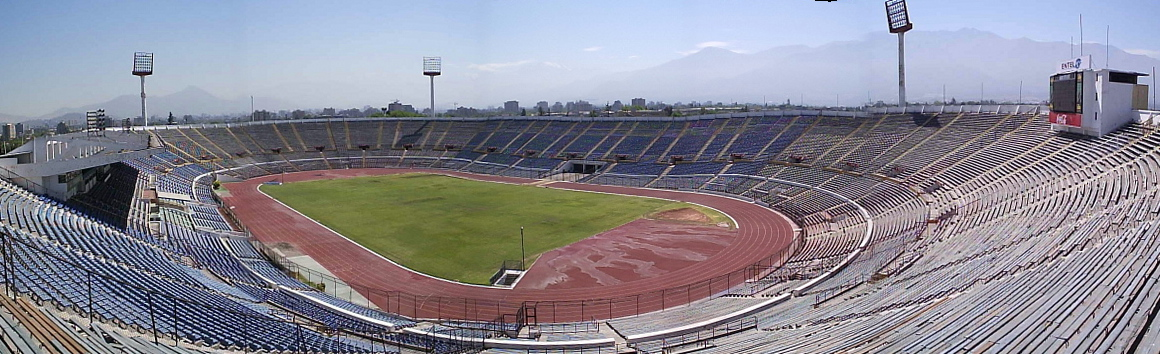
Host stadium in Chile.

== Results ==
=== Men ===
Event	Gold		Silver		Bronze	
100 metres	Mark Lewis-Francis; Great Britain	10.12 CR	Salem Mubarak Al-Yami; Saudi Arabia	10.38	Marc Burns; Trinidad and Tobago	10.40 PB
200 metres	Paul Gorries; South Africa	20.64	Marcin Jędrusiński; Poland	20.87	Timothy Benjamin; Great Britain	20.94
400 metres	Hamdan Obah Al-Bishi; Saudi Arabia	44.66 CR	Brandon Simpson; Jamaica	45.73 PB	Shinji Ishikawa; Japan	45.77 NJR
800 metres	Nicholas Wachira; Kenya	1:47.16	Florent Lacasse; France	1:47.61	Antonio Manuel Reina; Spain	1:47.90
1500 metres	Cornelius Chirchir; Kenya	3:38.80	Wolfram Müller; Germany	3:39.37	Philemon Kibet; Kenya	3:40.77 PB
5000 metres	Gordon Mugi; Kenya	13:44.93	Kenenisa Bekele; Ethiopia	13:45.43	Cyrus Kataron; Kenya	13:46.12
10,000 metres	Robert Kipkorir Kipchumba; Kenya	28:54.37	Duncan Lebo; Kenya	28:58.39	Abraha Hadush; Ethiopia	29:44.65
110 metres hurdles	Yuniel Hernández; Cuba	13.60 WLJ	Thomas Blaschek; Germany	13.80	Ladji Doucouré; France	13.84
400 metres hurdles	Marek Plawgo; Poland	49.23 WLJ	Pieter de Villiers; South Africa	50.52	Ockert Cilliers; South Africa	50.58
3000 metres steeplechase	Raymond Yator; Kenya	8:16.34 CR	David Chemweno; Kenya	8:31.95 PB	Abdelatif Chemlal; Morocco	8:43.57
10,000 metres walk	Cristián David Berdeja; Mexico	40:56.47 SB	Yevgeniy Demkov; Russia	40:56.53	Viktor Burayev; Russia	40:56.57
4 × 100 metres relay	Great Britain; Tyrone Edgar; Dwayne Grant; Timothy Benjamin; Mark Lewis-Francis	39.05 CR	France; Ronald Pognon; Fabrice Calligny; Ladji Doucouré; Leslie Djhone	39.33 NJR	Japan; Takashi Mogi; Kazuya Kitamura; Yusuke Omae; Hisashi Miyazaki	39.47 NJR
4 × 400 metres relay	Jamaica; Sekou Clarke; Aldwyn Sappleton; Pete Coley; Brandon Simpson	3:06.06 WLJ	Germany; Sebastian Gatzka; Christian Duma; Steffen Hönig; Bastian Swillims	3:06.79	Poland; Rafał Wieruszewski; Karol Terejlis; Adrian Galaszewski; Marek Plawgo	3:07.05 SB
High jump	Jacques Freitag; South Africa	2.24	Germaine Mason; Jamaica	2.24 NJR	Tomasz Śmiałek; Poland	2.21 PB
Pole vault	Aleksey Khanafin; Russia	5.30	Aleksandr Korchmyd; Ukraine	5.30	Rocky Danners; United States	5.20
Long jump	Cai Peng; China	7.88	Vladimir Zyuskov; Ukraine	7.84 PB	Yoelmis Pacheco; Cuba	7.71
Triple jump	Marian Oprea; Romania	16.41	Yoandri Betanzos; Cuba	16.34	Mohammed Hamdi Awadh; Qatar	16.29
Shot put	Rutger Smith; Netherlands	19.48 CR	Ivan Yushkov; Russia	19.06	Tomasz Chrzanowski; Poland	19.00 NJR
Discus throw	Hannes Hopley; South Africa	59.51 NJR	Niklas Arrhenius; Sweden	59.19 PB	Rutger Smith; Netherlands	58.70
Javelin throw	Gerhardus Pienaar; South Africa	78.11 NJR	Andreas Thorkildsen; Norway	76.34 NJR	Park Jae-Myong; South Korea	72.36
Hammer throw	Eşref Apak; Turkey	69.97 NJR	Dylan Armstrong; Canada	67.50	Aaron Fish; Australia	67.44
Decathlon	Dennis Leyckes; Germany	7897 CR	David Gómez; Spain	7772 NJR	André Niklaus; Germany	7712 PB
WR world record | AR area record | CR championship record | GR games record | NR national record | OR Olympic record | PB personal best | SB season best | WL world leading (in a given season)

=== Women ===
Event	Gold		Silver		Bronze	
100 metres	Veronica Campbell; Jamaica	11.12 CR	Katchi Habel; Germany	11.39 PB	Fana Ashby; Trinidad and Tobago	11.47
200 metres	Veronica Campbell; Jamaica	22.87 CR	Sina Schielke; Germany	23.20	Vida Anim; Ghana	23.81
400 metres	Jana Pittman; Australia	52.45	Aneta Lemiesz; Poland	52.78 NJR	Norma González; Colombia	53.30
800 metres	Jebet Langat; Kenya	2:01.51	Georgie Clarke; Australia	2:02.28	Lucia Klocová; Slovakia	2:04.00 PB
1500 metres	Abebech Negussie; Ethiopia	4:19.93	Rose Kosgei; Kenya	4:20.16	Georgie Clarke; Australia	4:20.21
3000 metres	Beatrice Jepchumba; Kenya	9:08.80	Jane Chepkoech; Kenya	9:10.05	Etalemahu Kidane; Ethiopia	9:11.55 PB
5000 metres	Dorcus Inzikuru; Uganda	16:21.32	Meseret Defar; Ethiopia	16:23.69	Sharon Cherop; Kenya	16:23.73
100 metres hurdles	Susanna Kallur; Sweden	13.02 WLJ	Fanny Gérance; France	13.21 PB	Adrianna Lamalle; France	13.27
400 metres hurdles	Jana Pittman; Australia	56.27	Marjolein de Jong; Netherlands	56.50	Melaine Walker; Jamaica	56.96 NJR
10,000 metres walk	Lyudmila Yefimkina; Russia	44:07.74	Tatyana Kozlova; Russia	44:24.43 PB	Sabine Zimmer; Germany	46:49.97 NJR
4 × 100 metres relay	Germany; Christa Kaufmann; Sina Schielke; Kerstin Grötzinger; Katchi Habel	43.91 WLJ	Jamaica; Veronica Campbell; Nadine Palmer; Kerron Stewart; Nolle Graham	44.05 SB	Sweden; Emma Rienas; Jenny Kallur; Susanna Kallur; Linda Fernström	44.78 NJR
4 × 400 metres relay	Great Britain; Kim Wall; Jenny Meadows; Helen Thieme; Lisa Miller	3:33.82 WLJ	Jamaica; Sheryl Morgan; Kareen Gayle; Anneisha McLaughlin; Melaine Walker	3:33.99 SB	Romania; Adela Diana Marchis; Liliana Barbulescu; Maria Rus; Alina Ripanu	3:34.49
High jump	Blanka Vlašić; Croatia	1.91	Marina Kuptsova; Russia	1.88	Marizca Gertenbach; South Africa	1.88 PB
Pole vault	Yelena Isinbayeva; Russia	4.20 CR	Annika Becker; Germany	4.10	Vanessa Boslak; France; Fanni Juhász; Hungary	4.10; 4.10 SB
Long jump	Concepción Montaner; Spain	6.47	Zhou Yangxia; China	6.45	Kumiko Ikeda; Japan	6.43 NJR
Triple jump	Anastasiya Ilyina; Russia	14.24	Anna Pyatykh; Russia	14.18 PB	Dana Veldáková; Slovakia	13.92 NJR
Shot put	Kathleen Kluge; Germany	17.37 PB	Li Meiju; China	16.57	Natallia Kharaneka; Belarus	16.40
Discus throw	Xu Shaoyang; China	54.41	Jana Tucholke; Germany	53.97 PB	Olga Goncharenko; Belarus	53.64
Javelin throw	Jarmila Klimešová; Czech Republic	54.82	Inga Kožarenoka; Latvia	54.64	Halina Kakhava; Belarus	54.26
Hammer throw	Ivana Brkljacic; Croatia	62.22 CR	Virginia Balut; Romania	60.23 PB	Yunaika Crawford; Cuba	59.98
Heptathlon	Carolina Klüft; Sweden	6056 WLJ	Lidiya Bashlykova; Russia	5898	Sanna Saarman; Finland	5707
WR world record | AR area record | CR championship record | GR games record | NR national record | OR Olympic record | PB personal best | SB season best | WL world leading (in a given season)

== Medal table ==
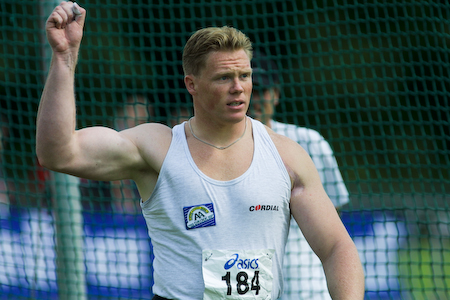
Rutger Smith of the Netherlands won the shot put gold and discus bronze.

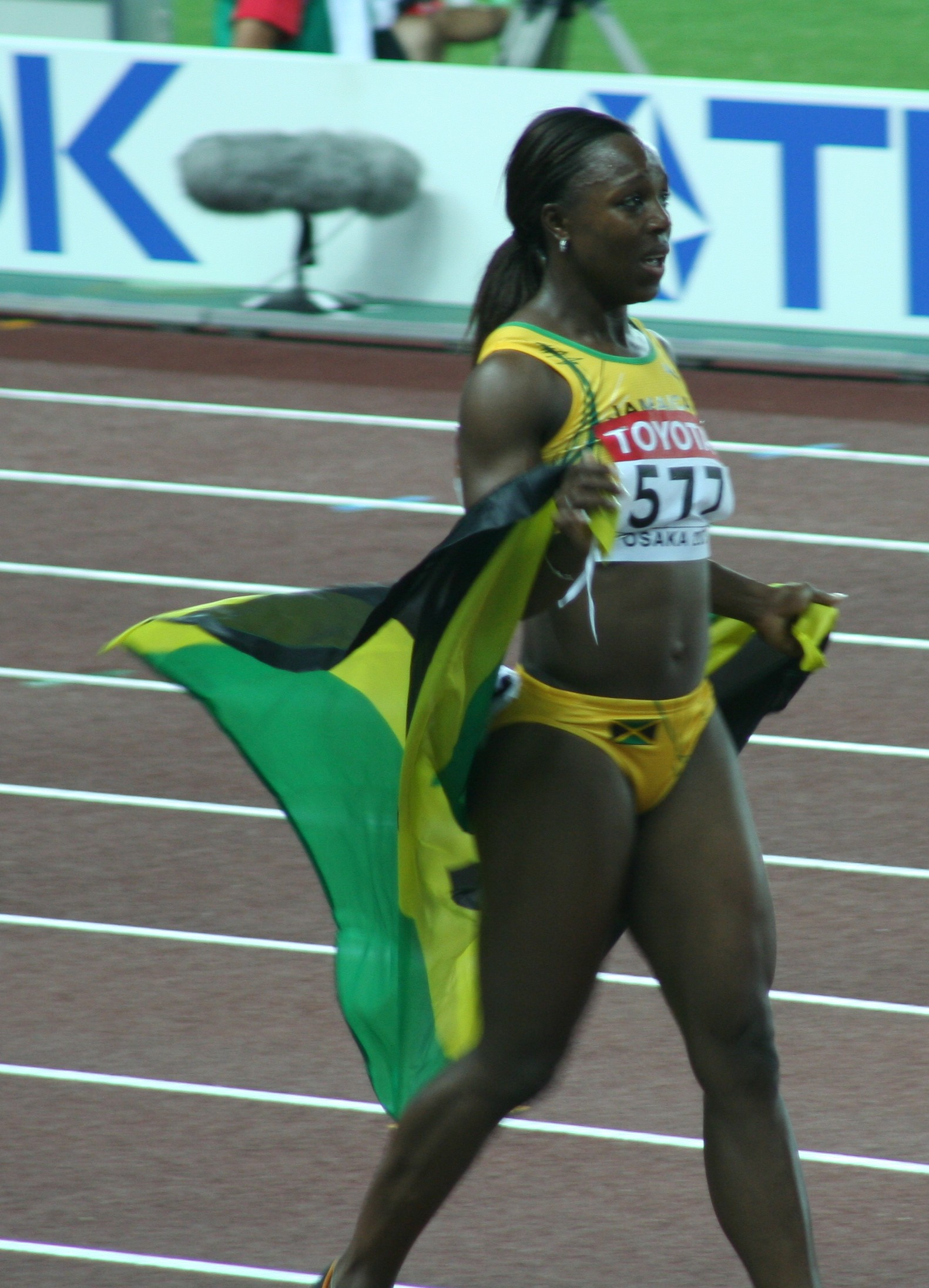
Veronica Campbell won a sprint double for Jamaica.

The host country is highlighted in lavender blue

Rank	Nation	Gold	Silver	Bronze	Total
1	Kenya	7	4	3	14
2	Russia	4	6	1	11
3	South Africa	4	1	2	7
4	Germany	3	7	2	12
5	Jamaica	3	4	1	8
6	Great Britain	3	0	1	4
7	China	2	2	0	4
8	Australia	2	1	2	5
9	Sweden	2	1	1	4
10	Croatia	2	0	0	2
11	Poland	1	2	3	6
12	Ethiopia	1	2	2	5
13	Cuba	1	1	2	4
14	Netherlands	1	1	1	3
14	Romania	1	1	1	3
14	Spain	1	1	1	3
17	Saudi Arabia	1	1	0	2
18	Czech Republic	1	0	0	1
18	Mexico	1	0	0	1
18	Turkey	1	0	0	1
18	Uganda	1	0	0	1
22	France	0	3	3	6
23	Ukraine	0	2	0	2
24	Canada	0	1	0	1
24	Latvia	0	1	0	1
24	Norway	0	1	0	1
27	Japan	0	0	3	3
28	Belarus	0	0	2	2
28	Slovakia	0	0	2	2
28	Trinidad and Tobago	0	0	2	2
31	Colombia	0	0	1	1
31	Finland	0	0	1	1
31	Ghana	0	0	1	1
31	Hungary	0	0	1	1
31	Morocco	0	0	1	1
31	Qatar	0	0	1	1
31	South Korea	0	0	1	1
31	United States	0	0	1	1
–	Chile*	0	0	0	0
Totals (38 entries)		43	43	43	129

== Participation ==
According to an unofficial count through an unofficial result list, 1122 athletes from 151 countries participated in the event. This is in agreement with the official numbers as published.

- Algeria (8)
- Andorra (1)
- Anguilla (1)
- Argentina (12)
- Armenia (2)
- Australia (50)
- Austria (6)
- Azerbaijan (2)
- Bahamas (4)
- Barbados (4)
- Belarus (11)
- Belgium (6)
- Bolivia (1)
- Botswana (5)
- Brazil (24)
- Bulgaria (7)
- Burkina Faso (1)
- Burundi (1)
- Cameroon (1)
- Canada (10)
- Cape Verde (1)
- Cayman Islands (1)
- Central African Republic (1)
- Chad (1)
- Chile (31)
- China (21)
- Chinese Taipei (8)
- Colombia (6)
- Cook Islands (1)
- Costa Rica (1)
- Côte d'Ivoire (2)
- Croatia (12)
- Cuba (10)
- Cyprus (2)
- Czech Republic (14)
- Denmark (1)
- Djibouti (1)
- Dominican Republic (2)
- Ecuador (2)
- Egypt (2)
- El Salvador (4)
- Equatorial Guinea (1)
- Estonia (4)
- Ethiopia (12)
- Fiji (1)
- Finland (16)
- France (51)
- Gabon (1)
- Gambia (1)
- Georgia (2)
- Germany (62)
- Ghana (3)
- Great Britain (41)
- Greece (22)
- Grenada (1)
- Guam (1)
- Guatemala (1)
- Guinea (1)
- Guyana (1)
- Honduras (1)
- Hong Kong (2)
- Hungary (16)
- Iceland (2)
- India (6)
- Indonesia (1)
- Ireland (11)
- Israel (7)
- Italy (22)
- Jamaica (29)
- Japan (30)
- Kazakhstan (9)
- Kenya (20)
- Kiribati (1)
- Kuwait (1)
- Latvia (11)
- Liberia (1)
- Lithuania (6)
- Macedonia (1)
- Madagascar (2)
- Malawi (1)
- Malaysia (2)
- Maldives (1)
- Mali (1)
- Malta (1)
- Mauritania (1)
- Mauritius (1)
- Mexico (9)
- Federated States of Micronesia (1)
- Moldova (3)
- Monaco (1)
- Mongolia (2)
- Morocco (9)
- Namibia (2)
- Nepal (2)
- Netherlands (9)
- Netherlands Antilles (1)
- New Zealand (19)
- Northern Mariana Islands (1)
- Norway (8)
- Palau (1)
- Panama (2)
- Papua New Guinea (1)
- Paraguay (1)
- Peru (4)
- Philippines (1)
- Poland (33)
- Portugal (12)
- Puerto Rico (2)
- Qatar (21)
- Romania (20)
- Russia (25)
- Rwanda (1)
- Saint Kitts and Nevis (2)
- Saint Lucia (1)
- Samoa (1)
- San Marino (1)
- São Tomé and Príncipe (1)
- Saudi Arabia (9)
- Senegal (3)
- Singapore (1)
- Slovakia (11)
- Slovenia (4)
- Solomon Islands (1)
- South Africa (26)
- South Korea (9)
- Spain (26)
- Sri Lanka (1)
- Sudan (1)
- Suriname (1)
- Swaziland (1)
- Sweden (21)
- Switzerland (7)
- Tajikistan (1)
- Tahiti (1)
- Tanzania (1)
- Thailand (1)
- Togo (1)
- Tonga (1)
- Trinidad and Tobago (10)
- Turkey (5)
- Turkmenistan (1)
- Uganda (2)
- Ukraine (20)
- United States (40)
- Uruguay (2)
- U.S. Virgin Islands (1)
- Uzbekistan (2)
- Venezuela (14)
- Yugoslavia (7)
- Zambia (1)
- Zimbabwe (2)
