= 2006 European Athletics Championships – Women's javelin throw =

Women's javelin throw at the European Athletics Championships

The Women's Javelin Throw event at the 2006 European Championships in Gothenburg, Sweden had a total number of 27 participating athletes. The final was held on Sunday August 13, 2006, and the qualifying round on Saturday August 12, 2006 with the mark set at 61.00 metres.

== Medalists ==
Gold	Steffi Nerius; Germany (GER)
Silver	Barbora Špotáková; Czech Republic (CZE)
Bronze	Mercedes Chilla; Spain (ESP)

== Schedule ==
- All times are Eastern European Time (UTC+2)

Qualification Round
Group A	Group B
12.08.2006 – 10:30h	12.08.2006 – 12:00h
Final Round
13.08.2006 – 14:35h

== Abbreviations ==
Q	automatic qualification
q	qualification by rank
DNS	did not start
NM	no mark
WR	world record
AR	area record
NR	national record
PB	personal best
SB	season best

== Records ==
Standing records prior to the 2002 European Athletics Championships
World Record	Osleidys Menéndez (CUB)	71.70 m	August 14, 2005	Helsinki, Finland
Event Record	Mirela Manjani (GRE)	67.47 m	August 8, 2002	Munich, Germany

== Qualification ==
=== Group A ===
Rank	Overall	Athlete	Attempts			Distance	Note
Rank	Overall	Athlete	1	2	3	Distance	Note
1	1	Barbora Špotáková (CZE)	66.12	—	—	66.12 m	NR
2	2	Steffi Nerius (GER)	63.35	—	—	63.35 m	
3	3	Zahra Bani (ITA)	X	54.74	61.15	61.15 m	
4	4	Christina Scherwin (DEN)	60.07	X	X	60.07 m	
5	6	Mikaela Ingberg (FIN)	56.41	59.79	X	59.79 m	
6	9	Rumyana Karapetrova (BUL)	59.03	58.65	X	59.03 m	
7	12	Goldie Sayers (GBR)	56.60	58.65	X	58.65 m	
8	14	Lada Chernova (RUS)	52.93	57.82	55.89	57.82 m	
9	16	Felicia Ţilea-Moldovan (ROM)	56.48	57.21	57.10	57.21 m	
10	19	Séphora Bissoly (FRA)	56.48	54.00	53.06	56.48 m	
11	20	Aggeliki Tsiolakoudi (GRE)	54.00	55.62	54.71	55.62 m	
12	22	Ilze Gribule (LAT)	X	51.93	54.48	54.48 m	
13	25	Ásdís Hjálmsdóttir (ISL)	X	45.51	51.33	51.33 m	
14	27	Annika Petersson (SWE)	45.08	44.00	47.34	47.34 m	

=== Group B ===
Rank	Overall	Athlete	Attempts			Distance	Note
Rank	Overall	Athlete	1	2	3	Distance	Note
1	5	Christina Obergföll (GER)	60.06	56.37	X	60.06 m	
2	7	Barbara Madejczyk (POL)	59.65	58.91	X	59.65 m	
3	8	Mercedes Chilla (ESP)	59.54	54.00	56.16	59.54 m	
4	10	Paula Tarvainen (FIN)	58.95	X	X	58.95 m	
5	11	Annika Suthe (GER)	58.04	57.39	58.92	58.92 m	
6	13	Inga Kožarenoka (LAT)	56.20	58.25	56.06	58.25 m	
7	15	Natallia Shymchuk (BLR)	56.75	57.11	57.40	57.40 m	
8	17	Savva Lika (GRE)	48.33	54.09	56.81	56.81 m	
9	18	Jarmila Klimešová (CZE)	X	56.02	56.76	56.76 m	
10	21	Martina Ratej (SLO)	55.49	X	51.16	55.49 m	
11	23	Claudia Coslovich (ITA)	50.80	52.65	54.44	54.44 m	
12	24	Kirsi Ahonen (FIN)	53.33	53.29	X	53.33 m	
13	26	Alexandra Tsisiou (CYP)	47.04	49.68	49.44	49.68 m	

== Final ==
Rank	Athlete	Attempts						Distance	Note
Rank	Athlete	1	2	3	4	5	6	Distance	Note
1st place, gold medalist(s)	Steffi Nerius (GER)	64.60	60.69	63.09	65.82	65.35	—	65.82 m	SB
2nd place, silver medalist(s)	Barbora Špotáková (CZE)	65.64	X	62.14	59.46	59.09	—	65.64 m	
3rd place, bronze medalist(s)	Mercedes Chilla (ESP)	57.26	59.63	X	X	61.98	X	61.98 m	
4	Christina Obergföll (GER)	55.29	59.59	59.60	X	61.89	58.20	61.89 m	
5	Christina Scherwin (DEN)	61.33	59.31	61.06	61.81	X	60.79	61.81 m	
6	Rumyana Karapetrova (BUL)	54.28	X	61.78	56.09	55.78	54.14	61.78 m	PB
7	Barbara Madejczyk (POL)	55.63	57.53	58.02	55.78	55.76	59.92	59.92 m	
8	Annika Suthe (GER)	58.25	57.03	56.03	X	X	54.88	58.25 m	
9	Zahra Bani (ITA)	57.91	55.58	X				57.91 m	
10	Mikaela Ingberg (FIN)	55.27	53.32	56.70				56.70 m	
11	Paula Tarvainen (FIN)	54.01	55.59	44.47				55.59 m	
12	Goldie Sayers (GBR)	54.70	X	X				54.70 m	

== See also ==
- 2004 Women's Olympic Javelin Throw (Athens)
- 2005 Women's World Championships Javelin Throw (Helsinki)
- 2007 Women's World Championships Javelin Throw (Osaka)
- 2008 Women's Olympic Javelin Throw (Beijing)
