= 2002 European Athletics Championships – Women's javelin throw =

Women's javelin throw at the European Athletics Championships

These are the official results of the Women's javelin throw event at the 2002 European Championships in Munich, Germany. There were a total number of 21 participating athletes. The final was held on Thursday August 8, 2002, and the qualifying round on Tuesday August 6, 2002 with the mark set at 61.00 metres.

== Medalists ==
Gold	Mirela Manjani; Greece (GRE)
Silver	Steffi Nerius; Germany (GER)
Bronze	Mikaela Ingberg; Finland (FIN)

== Schedule ==
- All times are Central European Time (UTC+1)

Qualification Round
Group A	Group B
06.08.2002 – 09:00	06.08.2002 – 10:20
Final Round
08.08.2002 – 19:45

== Abbreviations ==
- All results shown are in metres

Q	automatic qualification
q	qualification by rank
DNS	did not start
NM	no mark
WR	world record
AR	area record
NR	national record
PB	personal best
SB	season best

== Records ==
Standing records prior to the 2002 European Athletics Championships
World Record	Osleidys Menéndez (CUB)	71.54 m	July 1, 2001	Rethymno, Greece
Event Record	Fatima Whitbread (GBR)	77.44 m	August 28, 1986	Stuttgart, West Germany
Broken records during the 2002 European Athletics Championships
Event Record	Mirela Manjani (GRE)	67.47 m	August 8, 2002	Munich, Germany

== Qualification ==
=== Group A ===
Rank	Overall	Athlete	Attempts			Distance
Rank	Overall	Athlete	1	2	3	Distance
1	2	Steffi Nerius (GER)				60.27 m
2	3	Mikaela Ingberg (FIN)				59.60 m
3	5	Ageliki Tsiolakoudi (GRE)				58.51 m
4	8	Tatyana Shikolenko (RUS)				55.90 m
5	11	Nikolett Szabó (HUN)				55.30 m
6	13	Claudia Coslovich (ITA)				54.27 m
7	14	Nikola Tomečková (CZE)				53.88 m
8	15	Sarah Walter (FRA)				53.34 m
9	20	Jana Trakmann (EST)				47.18 m
—	—	Inga Jakubaityte (LTU)	X	X	X	NM

=== Group B ===
Rank	Overall	Athlete	Attempts			Distance
Rank	Overall	Athlete	1	2	3	Distance
1	1	Mirela Manjani (GRE)				61.09 m
2	4	Felicia Moldovan (ROM)				58.90 m
3	6	Kelly Morgan (GBR)				56.90 m
4	7	Taina Kolkkala (FIN)				56.01 m
5	9	Paula Huhtaniemi (FIN)				55.69 m
6	10	Elisabetta Marin (ITA)				55.52 m
7	12	Inga Kožarenoka (LAT)				55.20 m
8	16	Khrystyna Klyshchevska (UKR)				51.77 m
9	17	Barbora Špotáková (CZE)				51.71 m
10	18	Christina Scherwin (DEN)				50.51 m
11	19	Dörthe Friedrich (GER)				49.46 m

== Final ==
Rank	Athlete	Attempts						Distance	Note
Rank	Athlete	1	2	3	4	5	6	Distance	Note
1st place, gold medalist(s)	Mirela Manjani (GRE)	60.77	67.47	63.19	X	60.71	—	67.47 m	CR
2nd place, silver medalist(s)	Steffi Nerius (GER)	61.76	X	64.09	63.12	61.81	X	64.09 m	
3rd place, bronze medalist(s)	Mikaela Ingberg (FIN)	X	61.03	61.33	X	—	63.50	63.50 m	
4	Tatyana Shikolenko (RUS)	62.57	60.83	62.17	62.31	X	63.24	63.24 m	
5	Aggeliki Tsiolakoudi (GRE)	63.14	61.79	X	59.93	X	57.86	63.14 m	
6	Elisabetta Marin (ITA)	54.30	52.51	60.12	X	52.52	52.95	60.12 m	
7	Taina Kolkkala (FIN)	59.66	x	59.81	59.23	X	X	59.81 m	
8	Nikolett Szabó (HUN)	58.88	59.22	59.28	X	X	X	59.28 m	
9	Felicia Moldovan (ROM)	58.88	X	X				58.88 m	
10	Paula Huhtaniemi (FIN)	53.16	56.24	X				56.24 m	
11	Inga Kožarenoka (LAT)	55.28	X	X				55.28 m	
12	Kelly Morgan (GBR)	52.49	53.89	X				53.89 m	

== See also ==
- 1999 Women's World Championships Javelin Throw (Seville)
- 2000 Women's Olympic Javelin Throw (Sydney)
- 2001 Women's World Championships Javelin Throw (Edmonton)
- 2003 Women's World Championships Javelin Throw (Paris)
- 2004 Women's Olympic Javelin Throw (Athens)
- 2005 Women's World Championships Javelin Throw (Helsinki)
