= 2009 World Championships in Athletics – Women's javelin throw =

The Women's Javelin Throw at the 2009 World Championships in Athletics was held at the Olympic Stadium on August 16 and August 18. The event featured four athletes whose ability was so much better than the opposition that Mirko Jalava of the IAAF said it would be a "major surprise" should another athlete beat them to the podium.

The Olympic champion and world record holder Barbora Špotáková, and Beijing silver medallist Mariya Abakumova, had not matched their Olympic form of the previous year but remained strong contenders for the competition. The other two athletes came from the German team, which was headed by world-leader and two-time World medallist Christina Obergföll, as well as the veteran Steffi Nerius who won silver in 2003, 2005 and 2007. Osleidys Menéndez, Sunette Viljoen and Madara Palameika were the outside contenders.

A modest qualifying round was highlighted by Abakumova's world-leading throw of 68.92 m, while German number three Linda Stahl and Slovenian Martina Ratej threw season's bests to qualify as the second and third best throwers. The first round saw the elimination of two of the season's top-six athletes, Palameika and Viljoen. On the final day, Nerius opened the competition in style with a season's best 67.30 m on her first throw, while Špotáková and Monica Stoian completed the top three with 64.94 and 64.51 m respectively. With a throw of 65.39 m Mariya Abakumova moved into the bronze medal position, and she would remain there for the rest of the event. Obergföll and Stahl moved into the top six in round three, but the positions remained static thereafter. Neither Špotáková nor Abakumova (whose qualifying throw would have won the final) could find the form to dislodge Nerius from the gold medal spot. The 37-year-old German won her first ever World Championship gold medal in Berlin, in what was her final year in competitive athletics.

== Medalists ==
Gold	Steffi Nerius; Germany (GER)
Silver	Barbora Špotáková; Czech Republic (CZE)
Bronze	Monica Stoian; Romania (ROM)

== Schedule ==
- All times are Central European Time (UTC+1)

Qualification Round
Group A	Group B
16.08.2009 – 10:45h	16.08.2009 – 10:45h
Final Round
18.08.2009 – 19:25h

== Qualification standards ==
A standard	B standard
61.00 metres	59.00 metres

== Records ==
Standing records prior to the 2009 World Athletics Championships
World record	Barbora Špotáková (CZE)	72.28 m	13 September 2008	Stuttgart, Germany
Event record	Osleidys Menéndez (CUB)	71.70 m	14 August 2005	Helsinki, Finland
Season Best	Christina Obergföll (GER)	68.59 m	20 June 2009	Leiria, Portugal
African record	Sunette Viljoen (RSA)	65.43 m	7 July 2009	Belgrade, Serbia
Asian record	Wei Jianhua (CHN)	63.92 m	18 August 2000	Beijing, PR China
North American record	Osleidys Menéndez (CUB)	71.70 m	14 August 2005	Helsinki, Finland
South American record	Sabina Moya (COL)	62.62 m	12 May 2002	Guatemala City, Guatemala
European record	Barbora Špotáková (CZE)	72.28 m	13 September 2008	Stuttgart, Germany
Oceanian record	Louise Currey (AUS)	66.80 m	5 August 2000	Runaway Bay, Australia

== Results ==
=== Qualification ===
Qualification: Qualifying distance 62.00 (Q) or the least 12 best athletes and ties (q) advance to the final.

Rank	Group	Athlete	Nationality	#1	#2	#3	Result	Notes
1	A	Linda Stahl	Germany	63.86			63.86	Q, SB
2	A	Martina Ratej	Slovenia	53.13	63.42		63.42	Q, SB
3	A	Barbora Špotáková	Czech Republic	63.27			63.27	Q
4	B	Osleidys Menéndez	Cuba	59.86	61.94	x	61.94	q
5	A	Steffi Nerius	Germany	61.00	x	61.73	61.73	q
6	B	Christina Obergföll	Germany	60.04	59.86	60.74	60.74	q
7	A	Monica Stoian	Romania	59.45	60.29	55.57	60.29	q
8	A	Vira Rebryk	Ukraine	59.68	59.70	58.27	59.70	q
9	A	Savva Lika	Greece	57.26	x	59.64	59.64	q
10	B	Rachel Yurkovich	United States	59.57	53.84	59.55	59.57	q
11	B	Maria Nicoleta Negoita	Romania	59.46	x	56.32	59.46	q
12	A	Goldie Sayers	Great Britain & N.I.	56.44	58.58	58.98	58.98	
13	B	Mikaela Ingberg	Finland	53.86	57.88	x	57.88	
14	B	Kimberley Mickle	Australia	57.46	x	56.85	57.46	
15	A	Yainelis Ribeaux	Cuba	57.26	57.38	56.48	57.38	
16	B	Olha Ivankova	Ukraine	56.91	54.86	54.85	56.91	
17	B	Sunette Viljoen	South Africa	x	56.83	49.45	56.83	
18	A	Mercedes Chilla	Spain	56.68	x	x	56.68	
19	B	Urszula Piwnicka	Poland	56.33	56.49	55.74	56.49	
20	A	Maryna Novik	Belarus	51.56	56.44	55.01	56.44	
21	B	Yanet Cruz	Cuba	55.50	56.19	x	56.19	
22	B	Ásdís Hjálmsdóttir	Iceland	55.86	55.27	x	55.86	
23	A	Indrė Jakubaitytė	Lithuania	55.86	x	x	55.86	
24	B	Yuki Ebihara	Japan	49.14	53.30	54.81	54.81	
25	B	Moonika Aava	Estonia	49.49	52.69	53.86	53.86	
26	B	Madara Palameika	Latvia	51.80	52.98	x	52.98	
27	B	Valeriya Zabruskova	Russia	47.31	52.87	51.13	52.87	
28	A	Kara Patterson	United States	50.60	x	52.71	52.71	
29	A	Elisabeth Pauer	Austria	x	49.32	50.88	50.88	
30	A	Serafina Akeli	Samoa	49.58	x	x	49.58	
DSQ	A	Mariya Abakumova	Russia	~~68.92~~			~~68.92~~	Q, WL

Key: Q = qualification by place in heat, q = qualification by overall place, SB = Seasonal best, WL = World leading (in a given season)

=== Final ===
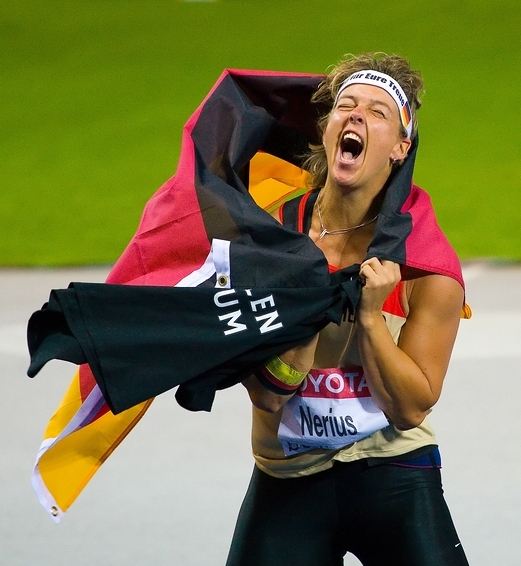
Steffi Nerius won her first Championship gold medal at age 37.

Rank	Athlete	Nationality	#1	#2	#3	#4	#5	#6	Result	Notes
1st place, gold medalist(s)	Steffi Nerius	Germany	67.30	62.79	65.81	x	62.27	x	67.30	SB
2nd place, silver medalist(s)	Barbora Špotáková	Czech Republic	64.94	64.26	66.42	61.29	62.25	59.74	66.42	
3rd place, bronze medalist(s)	Monica Stoian	Romania	64.51	x	61.90	59.62	61.84	61.53	64.51	PB
4	Christina Obergföll	Germany	x	60.37	64.34	x	63.02	x	64.34	
5	Linda Stahl	Germany	61.64	63.23	63.18	59.00	61.33	60.90	63.23	
6	Osleidys Menéndez	Cuba	63.11	x	x	x	61.56	58.27	63.11	SB
7	Savva Lika	Greece	56.55	57.33	58.80	57.29	x	60.29	60.29	
8	Vira Rebryk	Ukraine	58.25	56.78	57.50				58.25	
9	Maria Nicoleta Negoita	Romania	57.59	57.65	x				57.65	
10	Martina Ratej	Slovenia	57.57	x	x				57.57	
11	Rachel Yurkovich	United States	51.15	50.05	x				51.15	
DSQ	Mariya Abakumova	Russia	~~63.01~~	~~x~~	~~65.39~~	~~x~~	~~59.71~~	~~66.06~~	~~66.06~~	

Key: PB = Personal best, SB = Seasonal best
