= Athletics at the 2003 Summer Universiade – Women's javelin throw =

The women's javelin throw event at the 2003 Summer Universiade was held on 30 August in Daegu, South Korea.

== Results ==
Rank	Athlete	Nationality	#1	#2	#3	#4	#5	#6	Result	Notes
1st place, gold medalist(s)	Barbara Madejczyk	Poland	56.23	55.05	54.25	53.40	51.83	x	56.23	
2nd place, silver medalist(s)	Christina Scherwin	Denmark	52.87	54.07	56.08	52.83	x	x	56.08	
3rd place, bronze medalist(s)	Mercedes Chilla	Spain	54.45	53.49	53.69	x	55.94	x	55.94	
4	Barbora Špotáková	Czech Republic	53.85	x	55.31	52.28	54.82	51.54	55.31	
5	Goldie Sayers	Great Britain	53.88	51.48	51.66	x	x	54.56	54.56	
6	Natallia Shymchuk	Belarus	53.86	48.92	51.91	50.33	54.30	54.32	54.32	
7	Mariya Yakovenko	Russia	53.57	49.17	50.76	50.75	50.00	46.98	53.57	
8	Christina Obergföll	Germany	52.68	48.49	53.38	51.73	x	x	53.38	
9	Elisabetta Marin	Italy	53.17	x	50.50				53.17	
10	Tatiana Fedotova	Russia	53.00	45.88	47.29				53.00	
11	Stefanie Hessler	Germany	51.64	50.10	52.86				52.86	
12	Kathryn Mitchell	Australia	51.21	52.05	x				52.05	
13	Inga Stasiulionytė	Lithuania	51.64	47.70	x				51.64	
14	Xénia Frajka	Hungary	49.80	50.85	51.39				51.39	
15	Jang Jung-Yeon	South Korea	51.30	x	51.09				51.30	
16	Zuleima Araméndiz	Colombia	x	51.07	51.21				51.21	
17	Cristina Ferreira	Portugal	45.38	49.61	48.88				49.61	
18	Dominique Bilodeau	Canada	49.06	44.49	46.28				49.06	
19	Yang Lina	China	48.48	x	48.36				48.48	
20	Ridma Fernando	Sri Lanka	41.72	40.08	38.52				41.72	
21	Caroline Larose	Canada	x	41.17	x				41.17	
