= 2005 World Championships in Athletics – Women's javelin throw =

Video on YouTube Official video

The women's javelin throw event at the 2005 World Championships in Athletics was held at the Helsinki Olympic Stadium on August 12 and August 14. It was a high-quality contest where Olympic champion Osleidys Menéndez set a new world record whereas Christina Obergföll set a new European record.

== Medalists ==
Gold	Osleidys Menéndez; Cuba (CUB)
Silver	Christina Obergföll; Germany (GER)
Bronze	Steffi Nerius; Germany (GER)

== Schedule ==
- All times are Eastern European Time (UTC+2)

Qualification Round
Group A	Group B
12.08.2005 – 13:20h	12.08.2005 – 14:40h
Final Round
14.08.2005 – 19:25h

== Abbreviations ==
- All results shown are in metres

Q	automatic qualification
q	qualification by rank
DNS	did not start
NM	no mark
WR	world record
AR	area record
NR	national record
PB	personal best
SB	season best

== Records ==
Standing records prior to the 2005 World Athletics Championships
World Record	Osleidys Menéndez (CUB)	71.54 m	July 1, 2001	Rethymno, Greece
Event Record	Osleidys Menéndez (CUB)	69.53 m	August 6, 2001	Edmonton, Canada
Season Best	Sonia Bisset (CUB)	67.67 m	July 6, 2005	Salamanca, Spain
Broken records during the 2005 World Athletics Championships
World Record	Osleidys Menéndez (CUB)	71.70 m	August 14, 2005	Helsinki, Finland
Event Record	Osleidys Menéndez (CUB)	71.70 m	August 14, 2005	Helsinki, Finland

== Qualification ==
=== Group A ===
Rank	Overall	Athlete	Attempts			Result	Note
Rank	Overall	Athlete	1	2	3	Result	Note
1	2	Osleidys Menéndez (CUB)	65.77	—	—	65.77 m	
2	4	Christina Obergföll (GER)	X	59.60	61.59	61.59 m	
3	6	Mikaela Ingberg (FIN)	56.52	55.58	61.06	61.06 m	SB
4	8	Goldie Sayers (GBR)	60.67	—	—	60.67 m	
5	9	Christina Scherwin (DEN)	X	60.11	X	60.11 m	
6	12	Aggeliki Tsiolakoudi (GRE)	54.35	57.15	59.06	59.06 m	
7	15	Mercedes Chilla (ESP)	X	57.82	58.38	58.38 m	
8	18	Olha Ivankova (UKR)	56.56	55.56	56.53	56.56 m	
9	19	Claudia Coslovich (ITA)	54.29	55.78	X	55.78 m	
10	21	Kim Kreiner (USA)	55.05	50.55	52.88	55.05 m	
11	23	Felicia Ţilea-Moldovan (ROM)	X	50.66	54.68	54.68 m	
12	24	Noraida Bicet (CUB)	X	54.52	X	54.52 m	
13	25	Inga Stasiulionyté (LTU)	54.38	51.22	51.53	54.38 m	
14	26	Moonika Aava (EST)	50.57	54.24	52.60	54.24 m	
15	28	Mariya Yakovenko (RUS)	50.37	49.85	49.93	50.37 m	

=== Group B ===
Rank	Overall	Athlete	Attempts			Result	Note
Rank	Overall	Athlete	1	2	3	Result	Note
1	2	Steffi Nerius (GER)	66.52	—	—	66.52 m	PB
2	3	Sonia Bisset (CUB)	64.50	—	—	64.50 m	
3	5	Laverne Eve (BAH)	54.27	57.68	61.12	61.12 m	SB
4	7	Paula Tarvainen (FIN)	58.53	X	60.83	60.83 m	SB
5	10	Zahra Bani (ITA)	60.09	X	55.76	60.09 m	
6	11	Rumyana Karapetrova (BUL)	57.45	59.22	58.07	59.22 m	
7	13	Barbora Špotáková (CZE)	57.21	56.51	58.74	58.74 m	
8	14	Olivia McKoy (JAM)	58.49	X	54.63	58.49 m	
9	16	Barbara Madejczyk (POL)	48.11	57.14	56.66	57.14 m	
10	17	Inga Kožarenoka (LAT)	53.78	56.71	50.46	56.71 m	
11	20	Nikolett Szabó (HUN)	53.01	52.26	55.17	55.17 m	
12	22	Savva Lika (GRE)	48.33	50.24	55.03	55.03 m	
13	27	Xue Juan (CHN)	50.53	53.81	X	53.81 m	
14	29	Serafina Akeli (SAM)	43.52	47.37	46.59	47.37 m	
—	—	Mirela Manjani (GRE)	X	X	X	NM	

== Final ==
Rank	Athlete	Attempts						Distance	Note
Rank	Athlete	1	2	3	4	5	6	Distance	Note
1st place, gold medalist(s)	Osleidys Menéndez (CUB)	71.70	X	—	65.53	63.80	—	71.70 m	WR
2nd place, silver medalist(s)	Christina Obergföll (GER)	61.55	70.03	—	—	—	59.67	70.03 m	AR
3rd place, bronze medalist(s)	Steffi Nerius (GER)	65.96	X	X	64.26	64.35	X	65.96 m	
4	Christina Scherwin (DEN)	59.36	62.32	60.04	63.43	X	X	63.43 m	NR
5	Zahra Bani (ITA)	55.28	60.71	54.06	X	56.16	62.75	62.75 m	PB
6	Paula Tarvainen (FIN)	62.64	X	X	X	56.89	X	62.64 m	SB
7	Sonia Bisset (CUB)	X	59.55	59.71	58.62	61.75	60.57	61.75 m	
8	Aggeliki Tsiolakoudi (GRE)	57.30	57.99	56.78	X	X	56.63	57.99 m	
9	Mikaela Ingberg (FIN)	56.77	55.70	57.54				57.54 m	
10	Laverne Eve (BAH)	X	51.96	57.10				57.10 m	
11	Rumyana Karapetrova (BUL)	57.06	53.54	55.73				57.06 m	
12	Goldie Sayers (GBR)	54.44	54.16	52.94				54.44 m	
