= 2007 World Championships in Athletics – Women's javelin throw =

The Women's Javelin Throw event at the 2007 World Championships in Athletics took place on August 29, 2007 (qualification) and August 31, 2007 (final) at the Nagai Stadium in Osaka, Japan. The qualification mark was set at 61.00 metres.

== Medalists ==
Gold	Barbora Špotáková; Czech Republic (CZE)
Silver	Christina Obergföll; Germany (GER)
Bronze	Steffi Nerius; Germany (GER)

== Schedule ==
- All times are Japan Standard Time (UTC+9)

Qualification Round
Group A	Group B
29.08.2007 – 10:00h	29.08.2007 – 11:25h
Final Round
31.08.2007 – 20:40h

== Abbreviations ==
Q	automatic qualification
q	qualification by rank
DNS	did not start
NM	no mark
WR	world record
AR	area record
NR	national record
PB	personal best
SB	season best

== Records ==
Standing records prior to the 2005 World Athletics Championships
World Record	Osleidys Menéndez	Cuba	71.70 m	August 14, 2005	Helsinki, Finland
Event Record	Osleidys Menéndez	Cuba	71.70 m	August 14, 2005	Helsinki, Finland
Season Best	Christina Obergföll	Germany	70.20 m	June 23, 2007	Munich, Germany

== Qualification ==
=== Group A ===
Rank	Overall	Athlete	Nation	Throws			Result	Note
Rank	Overall	Athlete	Nation	1	2	3	Result	Note
1	1	Nikola Brejchová	Czech Republic	64.29	—	—	64.29 m	SB
2	8	Barbara Madejczyk	Poland	60.09	60.86	57.87	60.86 m	
3	9	Christina Obergföll	Germany	59.92	60.77	60.49	60.77 m	
4	11	Sonia Bisset	Cuba	60.25	X	59.02	60.25 m	
5	13	Taina Kolkkala	Finland	58.61	59.52	59.47	59.52 m	SB
6	14	Zahra Bani	Italy	59.02	57.74	57.71	59.02 m	
7	16	Lada Chernova	Russia	58.12	55.72	56.93	58.12 m	
8	17	Mariya Yakovenko	Russia	55.96	57.09	57.51	57.51 m	
9	18	Goldie Sayers	Great Britain & N.I.	55.40	54.78	57.23	57.23 m	
10	21	Monica Stoian	Romania	56.84	55.68	55.22	56.84 m	
11	22	Alessandra Resende	Brazil	56.42	56.07	56.38	56.42 m	
12	23	Buoban Pamang	Thailand	56.28	55.19	55.21	56.28 m	
13	25	Indrė Jakubaitytė	Lithuania	51.84	56.16	X	56.16 m	
14	26	Dana Pounds	United States	50.43	55.00	53.02	55.00 m	
15	29	Dalila Rugama	Nicaragua	53.22	X	49.05	53.22 m	
16	30	Serafina Akeli	Samoa	47.91	X	50.29	50.29 m	SB
17	31	Emika Yoshida	Japan	47.49	49.13	49.70	49.70 m	

=== Group B ===
Rank	Overall	Athlete	Nation	Throws			Result	Note
Rank	Overall	Athlete	Nation	1	2	3	Result	Note
1	2	Barbora Špotáková	Czech Republic	63.77	—	—	63.77 m	SB
2	3	Paula Tarvainen	Finland	63.58	—	—	63.58 m	SB
3	4	Linda Stahl	Germany	62.80	—	—	62.80 m	PB
4	5	Savva Lika	Greece	57.39	57.91	62.38	62.38 m	SB
5	6	Steffi Nerius	Germany	60.94	61.89	—	61.89 m	
6	7	Olha Ivankova	Ukraine	X	61.68	—	61.68 m	PB
7	10	Mariya Abakumova	Russia	60.55	58.79	59.19	60.55 m	
8	12	Felicia Ţilea-Moldovan	Romania	51.70	60.07	X	60.07 m	
9	15	Sílvia Cruz	Portugal	54.81	56.62	58.53	58.53 m	
10	19	Alexandra Nasta-Tsisiou	Cyprus	57.17	X	54.49	57.17 m	SB
11	20	Lavern Eve	Bahamas	X	55.02	56.87	56.87 m	
12	24	Urszula Jasinska	Poland	54.70	56.20	53.68	56.20 m	
13	27	Mercedes Chilla	Spain	51.63	X	53.64	53.64 m	
14	28	Chang Chunfeng	China	51.67	X	53.41	53.41 m	
15	32	Rumyana Karapetrova	Bulgaria	48.50	X	47.68	48.50 m	
—	—	Lindy Leveau-Agricole	Seychelles	X	X	X	NM	

== Final ==
Rank	Athlete	Nation	Attempts						Distance	Note
Rank	Athlete	Nation	1	2	3	4	5	6	Distance	Note
1st place, gold medalist(s)	Barbora Špotáková	Czech Republic	66.40	60.30	67.07	64.28	63.56	64.61	67.07 m	NR
2nd place, silver medalist(s)	Christina Obergföll	Germany	64.01	65.26	60.90	61.87	61.12	66.46	66.46 m	
3rd place, bronze medalist(s)	Steffi Nerius	Germany	59.89	59.75	59.96	64.42	62.38	X	64.42 m	
4	Nikola Brejchová	Czech Republic	60.25	61.93	63.73	62.44	X	X	63.73 m	
5	Savva Lika	Greece	59.07	59.24	61.72	58.68	59.90	63.13	63.13 m	PB
6	Sonia Bisset	Cuba	57.77	56.38	61.74	X	X	53.18	61.74 m	
7	Mariya Abakumova	Russia	61.43	59.91	X	X	X	60.74	61.43 m	
8	Linda Stahl	Germany	60.10	58.28	58.38	61.03	X	59.75	61.03 m	
9	Barbara Madejczyk	Poland	58.37	58.31	57.32				58.37 m	
10	Olha Ivankova	Ukraine	57.56	56.88	57.87				57.87 m	
11	Felicia Ţilea-Moldovan	Romania	54.76	55.71	X				55.71 m	
12	Paula Tarvainen	Finland	53.50	X	50.04				53.50 m	
