= Annika Suthe =

German javelin thrower

Annika Suthe (born 15 October 1985) is a retired female javelin thrower from Germany. She was born in Mettingen, in Germany's North Rhine-Westphalia region. Her personal best throw is 61.38 metres, achieved in May 2004 in Halle, Saxony-Anhalt, which is the German junior record. This ranks her sixth among German javelin throwers, behind Christina Obergföll, Tanja Damaske, Steffi Nerius, Karen Forkel and Dörthe Friedrich.

She made her international debut at the 2003 European Athletics Junior Championships and she narrowly missed out on a medal, coming fourth in the javelin. She won the silver medal in the event at the 2004 World Junior Championships in Athletics and then went on to represent Germany at the 2004 Summer Olympics at the age of 18. The following year she was the gold medalist at the 2005 European Athletics U23 Championships. She represented her country at senior level at the 2006 European Athletics Championships and finished eighth overall. She returned to defend her title at the 2007 European Athletics U23 Championships, but ended the competition as runner-up behind her compatriot Linda Stahl. However, at the 2007 German Athletics Championships, she beat Stahl to take second place behind Christina Obergföll.

Suthe did not compete from 2008 to 2010. Following a ninth-place finish at the 2011 German Championships, she declared herself retired from the sport, having failed to overcome a series of elbow injuries.

== Achievements ==
Year	Competition	Venue	Position	Notes
Representing Germany
2004	World Junior Championships	Grosseto, Italy	2nd	57.15 m
2004	Olympic Games	Athens, Greece	21st	58.70 m
2005	European U23 Championships	Erfurt, Germany	1st	57.72 m
2006	European Championships	Gothenburg, Sweden	8th	58.25 m
2007	European U23 Championships	Debrecen, Hungary	2nd	57.86 m
