= 1998 World Junior Championships in Athletics – Women's javelin throw =

The women's javelin throw event at the 1998 World Junior Championships in Athletics was held in Annecy, France, at Parc des Sports on 28 and 29 July. An old specification 600g javelin was used.

== Medalists ==
Gold	Osleidys Menéndez; Cuba
Silver	Liang Lili; China
Bronze	Wei Yanan; China

== Results ==
=== Final ===
29 July

Rank	Name	Nationality	Attempts						Result	Notes
Rank	Name	Nationality	1	2	3	4	5	6	Result	Notes
1st place, gold medalist(s)	Osleidys Menéndez	Cuba	68.17	61.98	62.61	x	x	x	68.17	
2nd place, silver medalist(s)	Liang Lili	China	61.72	55.13	x	57.62	61.05	51.17	61.72	
3rd place, bronze medalist(s)	Wei Yanan	China	x	58.75	56.86	55.96	59.10	x	59.10	
4	Nikolett Szabó	Hungary	58.01	58.94	x	57.58	x	57.79	58.94	
5	Bina Ramesh	France	x	x	54.72	x	x	52.35	54.72	
6	Linda Lindqvist	Finland	54.15	54.26	x	54.68	51.95	50.19	54.68	
7	Mariana Melinte	Romania	50.01	53.79	52.45	49.21	x	52.25	53.79	
8	Tatyana Lyakhovich	Ukraine	50.37	49.38	52.59	50.87	48.17	x	52.59	
9	Monika Kolodziejska	Poland	46.95	48.81	51.31				51.31	
10	Dana Lehmann	Germany	50.65	50.52	49.27				50.65	
11	Andrea Gránicz	Hungary	49.93	47.87	48.45				49.93	
12	Carolin Soboll	Germany	47.91	47.70	48.37				48.37	

=== Qualifications ===
28 Jul

==== Group A ====
Rank	Name	Nationality	Attempts			Result	Notes
Rank	Name	Nationality	1	2	3	Result	Notes
1	Osleidys Menéndez	Cuba	65.93	-	-	65.93	Q
2	Liang Lili	China	51.42	x	53.39	53.39	Q
3	Linda Lindqvist	Finland	48.22	51.02	52.48	52.48	q
4	Mariana Melinte	Romania	49.97	51.91	47.05	51.91	q
5	Andrea Gránicz	Hungary	51.75	46.50	49.42	51.75	q
6	Dana Lehmann	Germany	48.63	48.27	51.74	51.74	q
7	Tanja Tessner	South Africa	47.93	44.66	46.55	47.93	
8	Yuk Yun-Kyong	South Korea	x	47.68	x	47.68	
9	Cecilia McIntosh	Australia	45.03	44.38	46.59	46.59	
10	Marie Bringard	France	45.60	40.33	x	45.60	
11	Goldie Sayers	United Kingdom	39.85	x	45.54	45.54	
12	Mercedes Chilla	Spain	x	45.45	41.60	45.45	
13	Ayako Moro	Japan	44.80	x	40.74	44.80	
14	Suniye Is	Turkey	43.60	x	40.92	43.60	

==== Group B ====
Rank	Name	Nationality	Attempts			Result	Notes
Rank	Name	Nationality	1	2	3	Result	Notes
1	Nikolett Szabó	Hungary	56.62	-	-	56.62	Q
2	Wei Yanan	China	55.98	-	-	55.98	Q
3	Bina Ramesh	France	x	54.95	-	54.95	Q
4	Tatyana Lyakhovich	Ukraine	51.21	52.83	46.37	52.83	q
5	Carolin Soboll	Germany	52.79	52.82	x	52.82	q
6	Monika Kolodziejska	Poland	48.73	50.54	50.44	50.54	q
7	Jarmila Klimešová	Czech Republic	x	48.82	x	48.82	
8	Annika Petersson	Sweden	46.24	48.68	48.45	48.68	
9	Kelly Morgan	United Kingdom	46.58	x	x	46.58	
10	Ivana Bizaca	Croatia	x	x	45.91	45.91	
11	Huang Ya-Chin	Chinese Taipei	x	45.55	44.67	45.55	
12	Kazuyo Komasa	Japan	x	45.35	44.76	45.35	
13	Zahra Bani	Italy	41.98	36.99	44.38	44.38	
14	Oksana Gromova	Russia	40.59	41.13	38.92	41.13	
15	Veronica Abrahamse	South Africa	37.09	x	x	37.09	

== Participation ==
According to an unofficial count, 29 athletes from 22 countries participated in the event.

- Australia (1)
- China (2)
- Chinese Taipei (1)
- Croatia (1)
- Cuba (1)
- Czech Republic (1)
- Finland (1)
- France (2)
- Germany (2)
- Hungary (2)
- Italy (1)
- Japan (2)
- Poland (1)
- Romania (1)
- Russia (1)
- South Africa (2)
- South Korea (1)
- Spain (1)
- Sweden (1)
- Turkey (1)
- Ukraine (1)
- United Kingdom (2)
