= Athletics at the 2003 Pan American Games – Women's javelin throw =

Women's javelin throw at the Pan American Games

The final of the Women's Javelin Throw event at the 2003 Pan American Games took place on Thursday August 7, 2003. America's Kim Kreiner dethroned reigning PanAm champion and world record holder Osleidys Menéndez from Cuba.

== Medalists ==
Gold	Kim Kreiner; United States
Silver	Laverne Eve; Bahamas
Bronze	Osleidys Menéndez; Cuba

== Records ==
World Record	Osleidys Menéndez (CUB)	71.54 m	July 1, 2001	Rethymno, Greece
Pan Am Record	Osleidys Menéndez (CUB)	65.85 m	July 25, 1999	Winnipeg, Canada

== Results ==
Rank	Athlete	Throws						Final
Rank	Athlete	1	2	3	4	5	6	Result
1	Kim Kreiner (USA)	X	53.88	55.50	58.56	56.78	60.86	60.86 m
2	Laverne Eve (BAH)	X	60.42	X	X	X	60.68	60.68 m
3	Osleidys Menéndez (CUB)	60.20	58.06	X	58.79	X	57.98	60.20 m
4	Sabina Moya (COL)	56.77	X	54.20	52.86	51.69	60.17	60.17 m
5	Sonia Bisset (CUB)	56.78	54.81	X	X	54.31	58.00	58.00 m
6	Erika Wheeler (USA)	X	53.08	X	52.69	X	50.25	53.08 m
7	Zuleima Araméndiz (COL)	X	X	48.89	48.81	X	50.37	50.37 m
8	Leryn Franco (PAR)	48.06	50.21	X	47.62	X	48.40	50.21 m
9	Dalila Rugama (NCA)	X	X	44.50				44.50 m

== See also ==
- 2003 World Championships in Athletics – Women's javelin throw
- Athletics at the 2004 Summer Olympics – Women's javelin throw
