= Kim Mickle =

Australian javelin thrower

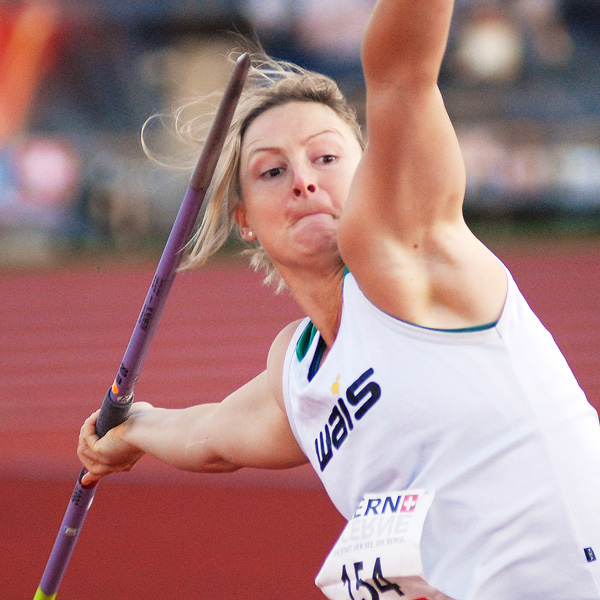
- Kimberley Mickle at the 2012 Spitzen Leichtathletik Luzern

Personal information
- Born: 28 December 1984 (age 41) Perth, Western Australia
- Height: 1.66 m (5 ft 5 1/2 in)
- Weight: 70 kg (154 lb)

Sport
- Country: Australia
- Sport: Athletics
- Event: Javelin

Achievements and titles
- Personal best: 66.83 m (2014)
Medal record
World Championships
Silver medal – second place	2013 Moscow	Javelin throw
Commonwealth Games
Gold medal – first place	2014 Glasgow	Javelin throw
Silver medal – second place	2010 Delhi	Javelin throw
World Youth Championships
Gold medal – first place	2001 Debrecen	Javelin throw

Kimberley Mickle (born 28 December 1984) is an Australian track and field athlete who competes in the javelin throw. Her personal best of 66.83 m, achieved on 22 March 2014 in Melbourne, was, until 2018, the Australian record.

== Biography ==
She won the gold medal at the 2001 World Youth Championships. She finished ninth at the 2002 World Junior Championships, fourth at the 2006 Commonwealth Games, fifth at the 2006 IAAF World Cup and sixth at the 2009 World Athletics Final. She also competed at the 2009 World Championships without reaching the final.

Mickle took the silver medal at the 2013 World Championships in Athletics reaching a result of 66.60 m (PB) behind Christina Obergföll.

In 2014, she won the gold medal at the Commonwealth games with a throw of 65.96 metres.

At the 2016 Summer Olympics, Mickle failed to advance to the final after dislocating her shoulder during the qualifying round.

In September 2016, Mickle signed to play professional Australian rules football for the Fremantle Football Club in the inaugural season of AFL Women's in 2017. She previously played the sport at a junior level. After missing the first round of the 2017 AFL Women's season due to a hip injury, Mickle ruptured an anterior cruciate ligament in round 2. After knee reconstruction, Mickle announced that she would concentrate on javelin in preparation for the 2018 Commonwealth Games, and would not return to football.

== Achievements ==
Year	Competition	Venue	Position	Notes
2001	World Youth Championships	Debrecen, Hungary	1st	51.83 m
2002	World Junior Championships	Kingston, Jamaica	9th	50.01 m
2006	Commonwealth Games	Melbourne, Australia	4th	58.18 m
2009	World Championships	Berlin, Germany	15th (q)	57.46 m
2009	World Athletics Final	Thessaloniki, Greece	6th	57.57 m
2010	Continental Cup	Split, Croatia	3rd	61.36 m
2010	Commonwealth Games	Delhi, India	2nd	60.90 m
2011	World Championships	Daegu, South Korea	6th	61.96 m
2012	Olympic Games	London, United Kingdom	17th (q)	59.23 m
2013	World Championships	Moscow, Russia	2nd	66.60 m
2014	Commonwealth Games	Glasgow, United Kingdom	1st	65.96 m
2015	World Championships	Beijing, China	22nd (q)	59.83 m
2016	Olympic Games	Rio de Janeiro, Brazil	22nd (q)	57.20 m
