= Goldie Sayers =

British javelin thrower

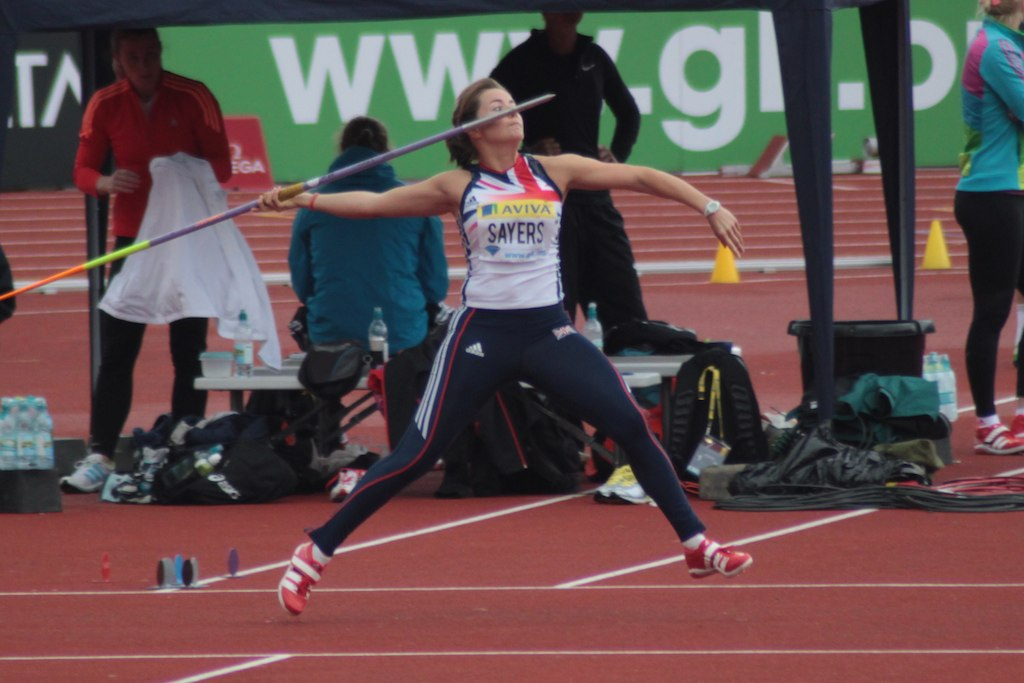
- Sayers setting a new UK javelin record at the Crystal Palace Grand Prix, 2012

Personal information
- Born: 16 July 1982 (age 44) Newmarket, Suffolk, England
- Height: 5 ft 7 in (1.70 m)
- Weight: 11 st (70 kg)

Sport
- Sport: Athletics
- Event: Javelin
Medal record
Women's athletics
Representing Great Britain
Olympic Games
Bronze medal – third place	2008 Beijing	Javelin
European Cup Winter Throwing
Gold medal – first place	2008 Split	Javelin
Silver medal – second place	2007 Yalta	Javelin
Silver medal – second place	2012 Bar	Javelin
European Junior Championships
Silver medal – second place	2001 Grosseto	Javelin

Katherine Dinah "Goldie" Sayers (born 16 July 1982) is a British former javelin thrower, who won a bronze medal at the 2008 Summer Olympics.

== Early life ==
Sayers, born in Newmarket, Suffolk, England, was educated at Fairstead House School, Newmarket, and at The King's School, Ely. She played hockey, netball and tennis at county level, and was an under 11 national table tennis champion.

== Career highlights ==
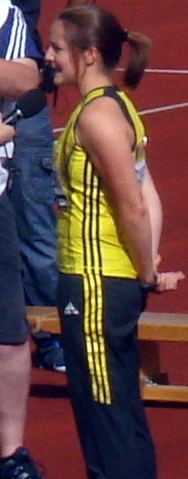
Goldie Sayers in 2009

Sayers first came to prominence when setting national junior records and winning national titles, in 2001. Sayers also served as the captain of Great Britain's women's under 20 team, this season. The following season, Sayers represented England at the 2002 Commonwealth Games in Manchester and finished in sixth place.

At the 2004 Olympic Games in Athens, Sayers represented Great Britain but failed to make the final at her first Olympics. She finished twelfth at both the 2005 World Championships and 2006 European Championships but she did finish fifth at the 2006 Commonwealth Games.

The early 2007 season boded well for Sayers, setting two UK records; on 20 May 2007, Sayers set a new British record in the javelin at 65.05 m (213 ft 5 in), thus becoming the first British woman to throw over 65 metres since javelins were redesigned in 1999. Sayers set the record when competing for her university, Loughborough, at the Loughborough International match. She cemented this achievement at the Norwich Union Glasgow Grand Prix on 3 June 2007 where she beat a top-class international field in rainy conditions with a throw of 63.59 m.

She defeated high-class rivals, such as Germany's European champion Steffi Nerius and the Czech Republic's Barbora Špotáková, who went on to win the world title that season, at a championship where Sayers finished 18th in qualifying, with her worst result of the season: 57.23 m.

On 15 March 2008 Sayers won the European Cup of Winter Throwing title in Split, Croatia, with a throw of 63.65 m.

Sayers originally finished fourth at the 2008 Summer Olympics in Beijing, China, setting a new British record of 65.75 m. However in 2016 the Russian third placed athlete, Mariya Abakumova, tested positive for banned substances after a re-analysis of her sample, meaning that Sayers would be upgraded to the bronze medal position. She eventually received her Olympic bronze medal on 20 July 2019 at the London Anniversary Games, 11 years later.

She improved her British record to 66.17m at the London Grand Prix Diamond League meeting in London in 2012.

On 4 July 2012, Sayers carried the Olympic Torch through Bourne in Lincolnshire.

On 7 August 2012, Sayers competed in the women's javelin at the 2012 Summer Olympics, but had sustained an injury to her right arm and was unable to feel her throwing hand. She threw three attempts but failed to throw the qualification distance and so stepped over the line and was knocked out of the competition without recording a mark.

Domestically, Sayers won a remarkable eleven British javelin throw titles, ten of which were consecutive from 2003 to 2012.

Sayers subsequently had elbow surgery which involved a ligament being removed from her right wrist and inserted in her left arm. She lost her funding from UK Athletics at the end of 2014, but philanthropist Barrie Wells agreed to fund Sayers' training in exchange for helping heptathlete Katarina Johnson-Thompson improve her javelin throwing.

== International competitions ==
Year	Competition	Venue	Position	Notes
Representing the United Kingdom and England
1998	World Junior Championships	Annecy, France	22nd (q)	45.54 m (old spec.)
1999	World Youth Championships	Bydgoszcz, Poland	5th	47.86 m
2000	World Junior Championships	Santiago, Chile	6th	51.52 m
2001	European Junior Championships	Grosseto, Italy	2nd	55.40 m
2002	Commonwealth Games	Manchester, United Kingdom	6th	51.32 m
2003	European U23 Championships	Bydgoszcz, Poland	11th	53.90 m
2004	Olympic Games	Athens, Greece	20th (q)	59.11 m
2005	World Championships	Helsinki, Finland	12th	54.44 m
2005	Universiade	İzmir, Turkey	4th	56.25 m
2006	European Championships	Gothenburg, Sweden	12th	54.70 m
2006	Commonwealth Games	Melbourne, Australia	5th	57.29 m
2007	World Championships	Osaka, Japan	18th (q)	57.23 m
2008	Olympic Games	Beijing, China	3rd	65.75 m
2009	World Championships	Berlin, Germany	13th (q)	58.98 m
2011	World Championships	Daegu, South Korea	10th	58.18 m
2012	European Championships	Helsinki, Finland	4th	63.01 m
2012	Olympic Games	London, United Kingdom	–	NM
2014	Commonwealth Games	Glasgow, United Kingdom	7th	57.68 m
2014	European Championships	Zürich, Switzerland	8th	58.33 m
2015	World Championships	Beijing, China	26th (q)	58.28 m
2016	European Championships	Amsterdam, Netherlands	26th (q)	53.56 m

== Personal life ==
Sayers' father, Pete Sayers, who died in 2005, was a bluegrass musician and the first Englishman to appear at the Grand Ole Opry.
