= Athletics at the 2001 Summer Universiade – Women's javelin throw =

The women's javelin throw event at the 2001 Summer Universiade was held at the Workers Stadium in Beijing, China on 29 August.

== Results ==
| Rank | Athlete | Nationality | Result | Notes |
|---|---|---|---|---|
| 1st place, gold medalist(s) | Osleidys Menéndez | Cuba | 69.82 | GR |
| 2nd place, silver medalist(s) | Nikola Tomečková | Czech Republic | 62.20 | |
| 3rd place, bronze medalist(s) | Wei Jianhua | China | 57.84 | |
| 4 | Aggeliki Tsiolakoudi | Greece | 57.15 | |
| 5 | Kimberly Kreiner | United States | 55.18 | |
| 6 | Mercedes Chilla | Spain | 53.32 | |
| 7 | Serene Ross | United States | 51.21 | |
| 8 | Dominique Bilodeau | Canada | 48.20 | |
| 9 | Andrea Bulat | Canada | 46.02 | |
| 10 | Leryn Franco | Paraguay | 43.69 | |
| | Aksana Vialichka | Belarus | NM | |
