= Athletics at the 2006 Commonwealth Games – Women's javelin throw =

Women's javelin throw at the Commonwealth Games

The women's javelin throw event at the 2006 Commonwealth Games was held on March 19.

== Results ==
Rank	Athlete	Nationality	#1	#2	#3	#4	#5	#6	Result	Notes
1st place, gold medalist(s)	Sunette Viljoen	South Africa	56.27	60.72	58.45	53.16	56.39	x	60.72	GR
2nd place, silver medalist(s)	Laverne Eve	Bahamas	57.00	x	60.54	58.54	55.23	52.77	60.54	
3rd place, bronze medalist(s)	Olivia McKoy	Jamaica	57.04	55.52	56.09	55.53	x	58.27	58.27	
4	Kimberley Mickle	Australia	55.68	x	51.86	58.18	54.97	x	58.18	
5	Goldie Sayers	England	50.96	55.79	54.75	54.07	52.85	57.29	57.29	
6	Kathryn Mitchell	Australia	55.22	49.33	54.06	52.47	49.90	47.64	55.22	
7	Lindy Leveau	Seychelles	51.58	53.91	54.50	51.84	51.22	x	54.50	
8	Rosie Hooper	Australia	51.81	52.46	51.27	51.73	47.02	51.76	52.46	
9	Serafina Akeli	Samoa	51.25	50.57	47.83				51.25	
10	Shelley Holroyd	England	47.37	49.38	49.46				49.46	
11	Anne de Silva	Sri Lanka	44.14	42.70	43.98				44.14	
12	Parveen Akhtar	Pakistan	41.22	37.33	39.25				41.22	
