= 2003 World Championships in Athletics – Women's javelin throw =

These are the official results of the Women's Javelin Throw event at the 2003 World Championships in Paris, France. There were a total number of 24 participating athletes, with the final held on Saturday 30 August 2003. The qualification mark was set at 60.00 metres.

== Medalists ==
Gold	Mirela Manjani; Greece (GRE)
Silver	Tatyana Shikolenko; Russia (RUS)
Bronze	Steffi Nerius; Germany (GER)

== Schedule ==
- All times are Central European Time (UTC+1)

Qualification Round
Group A	Group B
28.08.2003 – 17:00h	28.08.2003 – 18:55h
Final Round
30.08.2003 – 16:40h

== Abbreviations ==
- All results shown are in metres

Q	automatic qualification
q	qualification by rank
DNS	did not start
NM	no mark
WR	world record
AR	area record
NR	national record
PB	personal best
SB	season best

== Records ==
Standing records prior to the 2003 World Athletics Championships
World Record	Osleidys Menéndez (CUB)	71.54 m	July 1, 2001	Rethymno, Greece
Event Record	Osleidys Menéndez (CUB)	69.53 m	August 6, 2001	Edmonton, Canada
Season Best	Tatyana Shikolenko (RUS)	66.00 m	August 10, 2003	Tula, Russia

== Startlist ==
Order	No.	Athlete	SB	PB
GROUP A
1	492	Aggeliki Tsiolakoudi (GRE)	56.66	63.14
2	68	Lavern Eve (BAH)	62.89	63.73
3	1141	Kim Kreiner (USA)	60.86	64.19
4	211	Sabina Moya (COL)	60.17	62.62
5	690	Rita Ramanauskaitė (LTU)	60.87	62.69
6	951	Tatyana Shikolenko (RUS)	66.00	67.20
7	524	Nikolett Szabó (HUN)	62.88	64.62
8	174	Ma Ning (CHN)	62.38	62.38
9	453	Steffi Nerius (GER)	64.42	66.52
10	241	Osleidys Menéndez (CUB)	63.96	71.54
11	255	Jarmila Klimešová (CZE)	60.54	62.60
12	337	Mikaela Ingberg (FIN)	63.55	64.03
GROUP B
1	817	Leryn Franco (PAR)	53.09	55.38
2	231	Sonia Bisset (CUB)	60.75	67.67
3	896	Sunette Viljoen (RSA)	61.59	61.59
4	375	Sarah Walter (FRA)	62.53	62.53
5	627	Takako Miyake (JPN)	55.99	61.15
6	336	Paula Tarvainen (FIN)	64.90	64.90
7	482	Miréla Manjani (GRE)	66.52	67.51
8	339	Taina Kolkkala (FIN)	61.96	64.06
9	886	Ana Mirela Țermure (ROU)	61.91	65.08
10	957	Valeriya Zabruskova (RUS)	64.49	64.49
11	230	Noraida Bicet (CUB)	62.40	63.32
12	568	Claudia Coslovich (ITA)	62.70	65.30

== Qualification ==
=== Group A ===
Rank	Overall	Athlete	Attempts			Result	Note
Rank	Overall	Athlete	1	2	3	Result	Note
1	1	Tatyana Shikolenko (RUS)	63.71	—	—	63.71 m	Q
2	2	Lavern Eve (BAH)	62.89	—	—	62.89 m	Q, SB
3	4	Osleidys Menéndez (CUB)	61.74	—	—	61.74 m	Q
4	5	Mikaela Ingberg (FIN)	60.89	—	—	60.89 m	Q
5	7	Steffi Nerius (GER)	60.40	—	—	60.40 m	Q
6	9	Nikolett Szabó (HUN)	56.52	56.83	59.84	59.84 m	q
7	11	Ma Ning (CHN)	58.95	56.41	57.19	58.95 m	q
8	14	Rita Ramanauskaitė (LTU)	X	54.10	57.13	57.13 m	
9	15	Jarmila Klimešová (CZE)	X	56.98	55.53	56.98 m	
10	17	Aggeliki Tsiolakoudi (GRE)	56.02	53.37	56.66	56.66 m	SB
11	19	Sabina Moya (COL)	55.75	X	51.80	55.75 m	
12	21	Kim Kreiner (USA)	X	53.50	54.84	54.84 m	

=== Group B ===
Rank	Overall	Athlete	Attempts			Result	Note
Rank	Overall	Athlete	1	2	3	Result	Note
1	3	Mirela Manjani (GRE)	62.48	—	—	62.48 m	Q
2	6	Sonia Bisset (CUB)	55.99	60.64	—	60.64 m	Q
3	7	Valeriya Zabruskova (RUS)	60.40	—	—	60.40 m	Q
4	10	Claudia Coslovich (ITA)	59.57	X	55.99	59.57 m	q
5	12	Taina Kolkkala (FIN)	57.73	58.94	58.61	58.94 m	q
6	13	Ana Mirela Țermure (ROU)	58.50	55.90	56.88	58.50 m	
7	16	Sunette Viljoen (RSA)	56.78	56.04	52.93	56.78 m	
8	18	Noraida Bicet (CUB)	X	X	56.33	56.33 m	
9	20	Paula Tarvainen (FIN)	54.55	55.06	51.46	55.06 m	
10	22	Sarah Walter (FRA)	49.55	54.31	53.39	54.31 m	
11	23	Takako Miyake (JPN)	52.26	49.07	46.88	52.26 m	
12	24	Leryn Franco (PAR)	50.05	X	51.13	51.13 m	

== Final ==
Rank	Athlete	Attempts						Distance	Note
Rank	Athlete	1	2	3	4	5	6	Distance	Note
1st place, gold medalist(s)	Mirela Manjani (GRE)	64.55	64.46	64.09	66.52	X	56.84	66.52 m	SB
2nd place, silver medalist(s)	Tatyana Shikolenko (RUS)	62.76	62.99	63.28	X	60.67	59.93	63.28 m	
3rd place, bronze medalist(s)	Steffi Nerius (GER)	59.15	62.70	60.30	X	61.81	X	62.70 m	
4	Mikaela Ingberg (FIN)	61.37	59.98	—	62.02	—	62.20	62.20 m	
5	Osleidys Menéndez (CUB)	61.18	X	X	62.19	60.47	X	62.19 m	
6	Sonia Bisset (CUB)	56.90	58.21	60.17	X	X	56.36	60.17 m	
7	Claudia Coslovich (ITA)	55.48	58.81	59.64	56.05	57.89	56.14	59.64 m	
8	Lavern Eve (BAH)	56.43	54.39	59.60	X	58.47	57.55	59.60 m	
9	Valeriya Zabruskova (RUS)	59.51	54.19	58.67				59.51 m	
10	Taina Kolkkala (FIN)	57.50	57.00	56.71				57.50 m	
11	Ma Ning (CHN)	55.07	57.43	56.57				57.43 m	
12	Nikolett Szabó (HUN)	56.98	56.97	55.85				56.98 m	

== See also ==
- Athletics at the 2003 Pan American Games – Women's javelin throw
- Athletics at the 2004 Summer Olympics – Women's javelin throw
