= Kirsi Ahonen =

Finnish javelin thrower (born 1976)

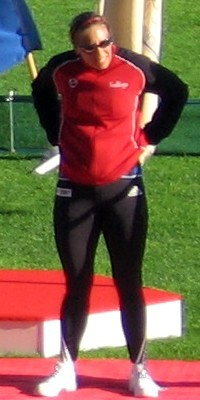
Kirsi Ahonen, 2008.

Kirsi Ahonen (born 8 April 1976 in Jurva) is a Finnish retired javelin thrower.

She competed at the 2006 European Championships without reaching the final.

Her personal best throw was 60.98 metres, achieved in July 2006 in Helsinki.
