= Mariya Yakovenko =

Russian javelin thrower

Mariya Yakovenko (Russian: Мария Яковенко; born 6 January 1982 in Krasnodar) is a female javelin thrower from Russia. Her personal best throw is 62.23 metres, achieved in August 2007 in Tula.

She competed at the World Championships in 2005 and 2007 as well as the 2008 Olympic Games, but without reaching the final.

Vakovenko tested positive for Dehydrochloromethyltestosterone (Oral Turinabol) 19 February 2013 and was subsequently banned for two years, ending 7 August 2015.

== International competitions ==
Representing Russia
Year	Competition	Venue	Position	Event	Result	Notes
2001	European Junior Championships	Grosseto, Italy	11th	Javelin throw	45.30 m	
2003	European U23 Championships	Bydgoszcz, Poland	3rd	Javelin throw	57.52 m	
2003	Universiade	Daegu, South Korea	7th	Javelin throw	53.57 m	
2005	World Championships	Helsinki, Finland	28th (q)	Javelin throw	50.37 m	
2007	World Championships	Osaka, Japan	17th (q)	Javelin throw	57.51 m	
2008	Olympic Games	Beijing, China	47th (q)	Javelin throw	51.67 m	

== See also ==
- List of doping cases in athletics
