= Barbara Madejczyk =

Polish javelin thrower

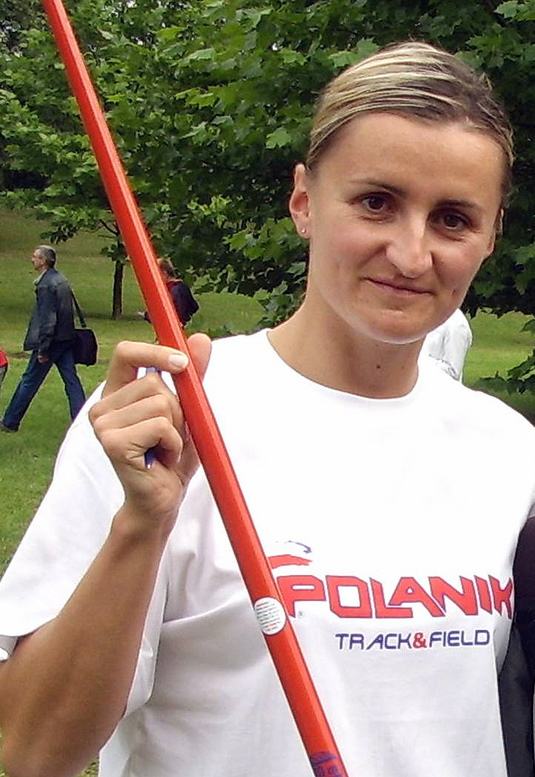
Barbara Madejczyk in 2007

Barbara Madejczyk (born 30 September 1976 in Ustka) is a javelin thrower from Poland. Her personal best throw is 64.08 metres, achieved in June 2006 in Málaga.

== Achievements ==
Year	Competition	Venue	Position	Notes
Representing Poland
2003	Universiade	Daegu, South Korea	1st	56.23 m
2004	Olympic Games	Athens, Greece	12th	58.22 m
2005	World Championships	Helsinki, Finland	16th (q)	57.14 m
2006	European Championships	Gothenburg, Sweden	7th	59.92 m
2006	World Athletics Final	Stuttgart, Germany	7th	
2006	World Cup	Athens, Greece	4th	
2007	World Championships	Osaka, Japan	9th	58.37 m
2008	Olympic Games	Beijing, China	7th	62.02 m

== See also ==
- Polish records in athletics
