= Olivia McKoy =

Jamaican athlete (born 1973)

Personal information
- Born: 1 December 1973 (age 52) St. Catherine, Jamaica
- Education: St. Jago High School, NCU ( Northern Caribbean University & La. Tech [ Louisiana Technical University (cum laude) Ruston, Louisiana, 1996-2000, USA, 71272
- Height: 165 cm (5 ft 5 in)
- Weight: 73 kg (161 lb)

Sport
- Sport: Athletics
- Events: javelin throw, discus throw, 5k, 50m, 100m, etc.
- Club: Olivia's Athletic Institute

Achievements and titles
- Personal best: JT – 61.10m NR (2005) Nassau Bahamas

Olivia Celia McKoy (born 1 December 1973) is a retired female shot put, weights, hammer, javelin, and discus thrower from Jamaica West Indies. Olivia McKoy also competes in the local 5K, 10K, & 1/2 Marathon Road Races.

She won gold and bronze at the 1992 Carifta Games in Nassau Bahamas. She won silver medals at the 1999 and 2005 Central American and Caribbean Championships and the bronze medal at the 2006 Commonwealth Games, and finished fourth at the 2006 Central American and Caribbean Games.

She also competed at the 2000 Olympic Games, the 2005 World Championships and the 2008 Olympic Games. Her personal best throw is 61.10 metres, the standing Jamaican Woman's record, achieved in July 2005 in Nassau.

McKoy received All-American status (2nd place finishes) at the 1997 & 1998 NCAA Division 1 Inter-Universities Championships, competing for Louisiana Tech University where she graduated, (Industrial organizational Psychology) cum laude. She was coached by Larry Carmichael. McKoy is also a graduate of North Caribbean University (cum laude).

McKoy went on to compete in the long distance races locally { walk races, 5k, 10ks 1/2 marathons} after competing at the 2008 Beijing Olympics. Following a stint coaching high school girl javelin and discus throwers in Georgia, McKoy returned to her hometown of Mandeville. She taught at Hydel High School, St. Mary's College, Bog Walk High, now Enid Bennett High, and Premiere Learning Centre (pre-school) in Georgia, USA, with plans to open her own school.'The Olivia's Athletic & Academic Institute

In March 2015, McKoy competed in the University of the West Indies Track and Field Meet and took first place in the women's javelin with a throw of 49.62 m. This performance has led to considerations of returning To Competitive training. Reopening a senior career for McKoy.

== Competition record ==
Year	Competition	Venue	Position	Event	Notes
Representing Jamaica
1992	CARIFTA Games (U20)	Nassau, Bahamas	1st	Discus throw	37.86 m
1992	CARIFTA Games (U20)	Nassau, Bahamas	3rd	Javelin throw	36.37 m
1999	Central American and Caribbean Championships	Bridgetown, Barbados	2nd	Javelin throw	54.24 m
1999	Pan American Games	Winnipeg, Canada	7th	Javelin throw	49.29 m
2000	Olympic Games	Sydney, Australia	21st (q)	Javelin throw	56.36 m
2005	Central American and Caribbean Championships	Nassau, Bahamas	2nd	Javelin throw	61.10 m
2005	World Championships	Helsinki, Finland	14th (q)	Javelin throw	58.49 m
2006	Commonwealth Games	Melbourne, Australia	3rd	Javelin throw	58.27 m
2006	Central American and Caribbean Games	Cartagena, Colombia	4th	Javelin throw	56.82 m
2008	Olympic Games	Beijing, China	34th (q)	Javelin throw	55.51 m
2011	Pan American Games	Guadalajara, Mexico	7th	Javelin throw	51.40 m
