= Mercedes Chilla =

Spanish javelin thrower (born 1980)

Mercedes Chilla López (born 19 January 1980) is a Spanish javelin thrower. She has represented Spain at two Summer Olympics (2004 and 2008) and has also competed at the World Championships in Athletics. Chilla is the Spanish record holder for the event, with a best mark of 64.07 metres, and has won medals at the Mediterranean Games and the Ibero-American Championships.

== Career ==
Chilla was born on 19 January 1980 in Jerez de la Frontera. She first reached the international podium at the 2003 Summer Universiade, where she took the bronze medal. She attended her first Olympic competition at the 2004 Athens Games and she was 22nd overall. In 2005, she enjoyed success at the regional level with another javelin bronze at the 2005 Mediterranean Games and she improved on her previous global competition performance with a fifteenth-place finish at the 2005 World Championships in Athletics.

Her 2006 season saw her gain a slew of European honours, starting with a bronze at the 2006 European Cup Winter Throwing and another third-place finish at the 2006 European Cup. She completed a trio of bronze medal performances by reaching the podium at the 2006 European Athletics Championships. She capped off a successful season with a personal best and Spanish record throw of 63.20 metres at the Herculis meeting in August 2006.

She suffered a number of injuries between 2008 and 2010, interrupting her international career, but she still managed ninth place at the 2008 Beijing Olympics and eleventh place at the 2009 World Championships in Athletics. She took the javelin gold at the 2010 Ibero-American Championships in Cádiz, nearing her top form with a winning throw of 62.39 m. Chilla improved her Spanish record the following week, throwing 64.07 m to win at the Liga de Clubes de División de Honor meeting in Valencia, Spain. This mark made her fifth in the world rankings and demonstrated her potential to return to the podium at the 2010 European Athletics Championships.

== Achievements ==
Year	Competition	Venue	Position	Event	Notes
Representing Spain
1998	World Junior Championships	Annecy, France	23rd (q)	Javelin throw (old spec.)	45.45 m
1999	European Junior Championships	Riga, Latvia	10th	Javelin throw	51.03 m
2000	Ibero-American Championships	Rio de Janeiro, Brazil	3rd	Javelin throw	55.99 m
2001	European U23 Championships	Amsterdam, Netherlands	2nd	Javelin throw	57.78 m
2001	Universiade	Beijing, China	6th	Javelin throw	53.32 m
2001	Mediterranean Games	Radès, Tunisia	6th	Javelin throw	51.44 m
2002	Ibero-American Championships	Guatemala City, Guatemala	4th	Javelin throw	57.74 m
2003	Universiade	Daegu, South Korea	3rd	Javelin throw	55.94 m
2004	Ibero-American Championships	Huelva, Spain	5th	Javelin throw	54.34 m
2004	Olympic Games	Athens, Greece	22nd (q)	Javelin throw	58.45 m
2005	Mediterranean Games	Almería, Spain	3rd	Javelin throw	57.69 m
2005	World Championships	Helsinki, Finland	15th (q)	Javelin throw	58.38 m
2006	European Championships	Gothenburg, Sweden	3rd	Javelin throw	61.98 m
2007	World Championships	Osaka, Japan	27th (q)	Javelin throw	53.64 m
2008	Olympic Games	Beijing, China	9th	Javelin throw	58.13 m
2009	World Championships	Berlin, Germany	11th	Javelin throw	56.68 m
2010	Ibero-American Championships	San Fernando, Spain	1st	Javelin throw	62.39 m
2010	European Championships	Barcelona, Spain	6th	Javelin throw	61.40 m
2011	World Championships	Daegu, South Korea	17th (q)	Javelin throw	58.34 m
2014	European Championships	Zurich, Switzerland	10th	Javelin throw	57.91 m
