= 1996 World Junior Championships in Athletics – Women's javelin throw =

The women's javelin throw event at the 1996 World Junior Championships in Athletics was held in Sydney, Australia, at International Athletic Centre on 21 and 23 August. An old specification 600g javelin was used.

== Medalists ==
Gold	Osleidys Menéndez; Cuba
Silver	Nikolett Szabó; Hungary
Bronze	Bina Ramesh; France

== Results ==
=== Final ===
23 August

Rank	Name	Nationality	Attempts						Result	Notes
Rank	Name	Nationality	1	2	3	4	5	6	Result	Notes
1st place, gold medalist(s)	Osleidys Menéndez	Cuba	54.58	58.14	56.56	60.96	x	52.86	60.96	
2nd place, silver medalist(s)	Nikolett Szabó	Hungary	56.42	55.76	55.86	58.34	x	x	58.34	
3rd place, bronze medalist(s)	Bina Ramesh	France	55.50	53.46	53.26	55.62	x	57.70	57.70	
4	Nora Bicet	Cuba	53.08	53.52	54.52	x	55.52	x	55.52	
5	Elizabeta Randjelovic	Slovenia	52.24	50.80	54.72	53.50	54.38	x	54.72	
6	Chu Chunxia	China	50.40	49.60	51.52	51.56	52.60	53.86	53.86	
7	Sarah Walter	France	50.64	49.00	42.78	51.80	52.86	x	52.86	
8	Andrea Gránicz	Hungary	43.36	50.84	48.84	x	52.80	43.58	52.80	
9	Laila Bergskas	Norway	50.42	49.66	x				50.42	
10	Sabina Moya	Colombia	49.60	48.52	50.40				50.40	
11	Veera Oksanen	Finland	x	x	49.98				49.98	
12	Yan Guoxiang	China	46.76	49.40	49.82				49.82	

=== Qualifications ===
21 Aug

==== Group A ====
Rank	Name	Nationality	Attempts			Result	Notes
Rank	Name	Nationality	1	2	3	Result	Notes
1	Nikolett Szabó	Hungary	46.68	55.66	-	55.66	Q
2	Osleidys Menéndez	Cuba	x	55.28	-	55.28	Q
3	Sarah Walter	France	51.90	54.34	-	54.34	Q
4	Chu Chunxia	China	48.62	54.34	-	54.34	Q
5	Laila Bergskas	Norway	52.40	49.08	48.96	52.40	q
6	Elizabeta Randjelovic	Slovenia	x	48.72	51.16	51.16	q
7	Åsa Lindberg	Finland	49.50	45.60	x	49.50	
8	Esther Eisenlauer	Germany	48.62	x	x	48.62	
9	Katarzyna Trojanowska	Poland	48.48	x	47.50	48.48	
10	Cecilia McIntosh	Australia	44.18	47.24	44.68	47.24	
11	Evguenia Sytcheva	Russia	47.10	46.50	x	47.10	

==== Group B ====
Rank	Name	Nationality	Attempts			Result	Notes
Rank	Name	Nationality	1	2	3	Result	Notes
1	Nora Bicet	Cuba	x	56.02	-	56.02	Q
2	Sabina Moya	Colombia	55.06	-	-	55.06	Q
3	Veera Oksanen	Finland	54.40	-	-	54.40	Q
4	Bina Ramesh	France	48.98	x	54.22	54.22	Q
5	Yan Guoxiang	China	51.18	51.02	x	51.18	q
6	Andrea Gránicz	Hungary	50.84	49.80	50.06	50.84	q
7	Doreen Günther	Germany	x	49.46	50.54	50.54	
8	Monika Kolodziejska	Poland	48.24	48.50	50.08	50.08	
9	Moonika Aava	Estonia	46.22	49.44	45.70	49.44	
10	Denika Kisty	United States	38.48	42.14	47.02	47.02	
11	Park Ho-hyun	South Korea	36.88	41.66	44.42	44.42	
12	Lindy Leveaux	Seychelles	36.70	39.06	36.42	39.06	

== Participation ==
According to an unofficial count, 23 athletes from 16 countries participated in the event.

- Australia (1)
- China (2)
- Colombia (1)
- Cuba (2)
- Estonia (1)
- Finland (2)
- France (2)
- Germany (2)
- Hungary (2)
- Norway (1)
- Poland (2)
- Russia (1)
- Seychelles (1)
- Slovenia (1)
- South Korea (1)
- United States (1)
