= Chang Chunfeng =

Chinese javelin thrower

Chang Chunfeng (born 4 May 1988) is a Chinese javelin thrower.

She competed at the 2007 World Championships and the 2008 Olympic Games without reaching the final.

Her personal best throw is 61.61 metres, achieved in June 2007 in Chengdu.

== Achievements ==
Year	Tournament	Venue	Result	Distance
2007	World Championships	Osaka, Japan	28th	53.41 m
2008	Olympic Games	Beijing, PR China	18th	58.42 m
