= Athletics at the 2008 Summer Olympics – Women's javelin throw =

Women's javelin throw at the Games of the XXIX Olympiad
- Venue: Beijing National Stadium
- Date: 19 August 2008 (qualification); 21 August 2008 (final)
- Competitors: 54 from 40 nations
- Winning distance: 71.42

Medalists
1st place, gold medalist(s)		Barbora Špotáková	Czech Republic
2nd place, silver medalist(s)		Christina Obergföll	Germany
3rd place, bronze medalist(s)		Goldie Sayers	Great Britain

The women's javelin throw at the 2008 Summer Olympics took place on 19–21 August at the Beijing National Stadium.

The qualifying standards were 60.50 m (A standard) and 56.00 m (B standard).

Mariya Abakumova held the lead from her first throw, with Barbora Špotáková the only other competitor within 3 metres. Abakumova improved to 70.78 on her fourth throw. Christina Obergföll took third place, and Goldie Sayers took fourth (with a British national record); both of these positions were gained from their first round throws with no improvement thereafter. Then Špotáková threw 71.42 on her final throw to win the gold medal, with Abakumova taking silver.

Eight years after the competition, the IOC retested samples from the event in connection with the Russian doping scandal. Mariya Abakumova tested positive for chlorodehydromethyltestosterone (turinabol), so she was disqualified and stripped of her silver medal, which was reallocated to Christina Obergföll. On 26 July 2018, the Court of Arbitration for Sport (CAS) confirmed the award of the bronze medal to Goldie Sayers.

== Schedule ==
All times are China standard time (UTC+8)

Date	Time	Round
Tuesday, 19 August 2008	09:00	Qualifications
Thursday, 21 August 2008	19:20	Finals

== Records ==
Prior to this competition, the existing world record, Olympic record, and world leading mark were as follows:

World record	Osleidys Menéndez (CUB)	71.70	Helsinki, Finland	14 August 2005
Olympic record	Osleidys Menéndez (CUB)	71.53	Athens, Greece	27 August 2004
World Leading	Barbora Špotáková (CZE)	69.15	Zaragoza, Spain	31 May 2008

No new world or Olympic records were set for this event.

== Results ==
=== Qualifying round ===
Qualification: 61.50 (Q) or at least 12 best performers (q) advance to the final.

Rank	Group	Athlete	Nationality	#1	#2	#3	Result	Notes
1	A	Barbora Špotáková	Czech Republic	67.69			67.69	Q
2	B	Christina Obergföll	Germany	67.52			67.52	Q
3	A	Steffi Nerius	Germany	59.15	59.74	63.94	63.94	Q
DSQ	A	Mariya Abakumova	Russia	61.23	63.48		63.48	Q
5	B	Goldie Sayers	Great Britain	60.79	62.99		62.99	Q
6	B	Barbara Madejczyk	Poland	62.81			62.81	Q, SB
7	A	Mercedes Chilla	Spain	56.98	61.81		61.81	Q, SB
8	A	Zhang Li	China	58.30	61.77		61.77	Q
9	B	Katharina Molitor	Germany	55.65	53.50	60.92	60.92	q
10	B	Felicea Moldovan-Tilea	Romania	53.25	55.89	60.81	60.81	q
11	A	Osleidys Menéndez	Cuba	60.51	x	60.41	60.51	q
12	A	Sinta Ozoliņa	Latvia	60.13	x	52.62	60.13	q, NR
13	B	Justine Robbeson	South Africa	56.75	54.26	59.63	59.63	
14	A	Urszula Piwnicka	Poland	51.33	52.99	59.28	59.28	
15	A	Savva Lika	Greece	56.44	58.59	59.11	59.11	
16	A	Vira Rebryk	Ukraine	55.77	57.12	59.05	59.05	
17	B	Mikaela Ingberg	Finland	55.71	58.82	58.36	58.82	
18	A	Chang Chunfeng	China	58.42	x	x	58.42	
19	B	Yanet Cruz	Cuba	58.06	57.15	57.03	58.06	
20	B	Lavern Eve	Bahamas	55.22	57.36	55.15	57.36	
21	B	Jarmila Klimešová	Czech Republic	52.18	57.25	x	57.25	
22	A	Nikolett Szabó	Hungary	56.98	57.15	x	57.15	
23	A	Natallia Shymchuk	Belarus	55.56	57.11	x	57.11	
24	A	Sílvia Cruz	Portugal	54.65	57.06	x	57.06	
25	B	Olha Ivankova	Ukraine	55.63	51.98	57.05	57.05	
26	B	Moonika Aava	Estonia	x	56.94	x	56.94	
27	A	Alessandra Resende	Brazil	54.05	56.53	54.32	56.53	
28	B	Buoban Pamang	Thailand	53.69	x	56.35	56.35	SB
29	B	Lindy Leveau-Agricole	Seychelles	56.32	55.90	50.74	56.32	SB
30	B	Erma-Gene Evans	Saint Lucia	46.79	54.60	56.27	56.27	
31	B	Maryna Novik	Belarus	56.10	x	53.48	56.10	
32	A	Inga Stasiulionyte	Lithuania	55.66	x	55.34	55.66	
33	A	Sunette Viljoen	South Africa	53.14	55.58	53.82	55.58	
34	B	Olivia McKoy	Jamaica	55.51	x	53.85	55.51	
35	B	Tetyana Lyakhovych	Ukraine	55.50	x	53.59	55.50	
36	A	Anastasiya Svechnikova	Uzbekistan	55.31	x	48.71	55.31	
37	A	Martina Ratej	Slovenia	55.30	51.56	53.24	55.30	
38	B	Kim Kreiner	United States	55.13	53.81	53.48	55.13	
39	A	Zuleima Aramendiz	Colombia	51.30	54.71	x	54.71	
40	A	Monica Stoian	Romania	x	54.56	x	54.56	
41	A	Kara Patterson	United States	54.00	50.35	54.39	54.39	
42	B	Song Dan	China	53.11	54.32	x	54.32	
43	A	Nadeeka Lakmali	Sri Lanka	x	53.44	54.28	54.28	
44	A	Christina Scherwin	Denmark	53.95	x	x	53.95	SB
45	B	Alexandra Nasta-Tsisiou	Cyprus	53.24	x	47.18	53.24	
46	A	Gim Gyeong-ae	South Korea	51.46	48.00	53.13	53.13	
47	B	Mariya Yakovenko	Russia	47.90	51.67	50.49	51.67	
48	A	María González	Venezuela	48.37	50.51	42.32	50.51	
49	B	Serafina Akeli	Samoa	47.83	42.78	49.26	49.26	
50	B	Ásdís Hjálmsdóttir	Iceland	x	x	48.59	48.59	
51	B	Leryn Franco	Paraguay	45.34	x	43.77	45.34	
52	B	Rumyana Karapetrova	Bulgaria	40.15	-	-	40.15	
	A	Zahra Bani	Italy	x	x	x	NM	
	B	Tatjana Jelaca	Serbia	x	x	x	NM	

AR area record | CR championship record | GR games record | NR national record | OR Olympic record | PB personal best | SB season best | WL world leading (in a given season)
DNS = did not start | DQ = disqualification | NM = no mark (i.e. no valid result) | Q = qualification by place in heat | q = qualification by overall place

=== Final ===
Rank	Athlete	Nationality	1	2	3	4	5	6	Result	Notes
1st place, gold medalist(s)	Barbora Špotáková	Czech Republic	69.22	67.04	x	64.92	x	71.42	71.42	AR
2nd place, silver medalist(s)	Christina Obergföll	Germany	66.13	x	63.34	x	x	x	66.13	
3rd place, bronze medalist(s)	Goldie Sayers	Great Britain	65.75	59.40	62.92	59.72	65.03	56.83	65.75	NR
4	Steffi Nerius	Germany	64.05	62.25	59.97	x	x	65.29	65.29	
5	Osleidys Menéndez	Cuba	63.35	x	x	x	x	x	63.35	
6	Barbara Madejczyk	Poland	58.74	59.16	58.67	x	58.21	62.02	62.02	
7	Katharina Molitor	Germany	53.19	57.37	59.64	58.81	56.72	57.00	59.64	
8	Mercedes Chilla	Spain	x	57.94	58.13				58.13	
9	Zhang Li	China	54.69	x	56.14				56.14	
10	Sinta Ozoliņa	Latvia	50.67	53.38	52.23				53.38	
11	Felicia Tilea-Moldovan	Romania	53.04	x	52.80				53.04	
DSQ	Mariya Abakumova	Russia	69.32	69.08	x	70.78	x	67.52	DSQ	
