= Jarmila Jurkovičová =

Czech athlete

Personal information
- Born: 9 February 1981 (age 45) Šumperk, Czechoslovakia
- Height: 1.73 m (5 ft 8 in)
- Weight: 75 kg (165 lb)

Sport
- Country: Czech Republic
- Sport: Athletics
- Event: Javelin
- Updated on 11 August 2012

Jarmila Jurkovičová (née Klimešová, Czech pronunciation: [ˈjarmɪla ˈklɪmɛʃovaː]; born 9 February 1981) is a Czech javelin thrower. Her personal best throw is 62.60 metres, achieved in June 2006 in Prague.

She won the 2000 World Junior Championships. She later competed at the 2003 World Championships, the 2004 Olympic Games, the 2006 European Championships, the 2008 Olympic Games and the 2012 Olympic Games without reaching the final.

== International competitions ==
Representing Czech Republic
Year	Competition	Venue	Position	Notes
1998	World Junior Championships	Annecy, France	13th (q)	48.82 m (old spec.)
2000	World Junior Championships	Santiago, Chile	1st	54.82 m
2001	European U23 Championships	Amsterdam, Netherlands	6th	53.73 m
2003	European U23 Championships	Bydgoszcz, Poland	1st	60.54 m
2003	World Championships	Paris, France	15th	56.98 m
2004	Olympic Games	Athens, Greece	25th	57.70 m
2006	European Championships	Gothenburg, Sweden	18th	56.76 m
2008	Olympic Games	Beijing, China	21st	57.25 m
2010	European Championships	Barcelona, Spain	9th	56.50 m
2011	World Championships	Daegu, South Korea	8th	59.27 m
2012	Olympic Games	London, United Kingdom	14th	59.90 m
