= Monica Stoian =

Romanian javelin thrower

Monica Stoian (born 25 August 1982) is a female javelin thrower from Romania.

She finished seventh at the 1999 World Youth Championships and won the silver medal at the 2007 Summer Universiade. She also competed at the 2007 World Championships and the 2008 Olympic Games without reaching the final.

At the 2009 World Championships in Berlin, she did make the final and finished third, achieving a personal best of 64.51 metres in her first attempt.

== Achievements ==
Year	Competition	Venue	Position	Notes
Representing Romania
1999	World Youth Championships	Bydgoszcz, Poland	7th	47.25 m
2007	Universiade	Bangkok, Thailand	2nd	61.19 m
2007	World Championships	Osaka, Japan	21st (q)	56.84 m
2008	Olympic Games	Beijing, China	40th (q)	54.56 m
2009	World Championships	Berlin, Germany	3rd	64.51 m
2009	World Athletics Final	Thessaloniki, Greece	7th	57.32 m
