= Kim Kreiner =

American javelin thrower (born 1977)

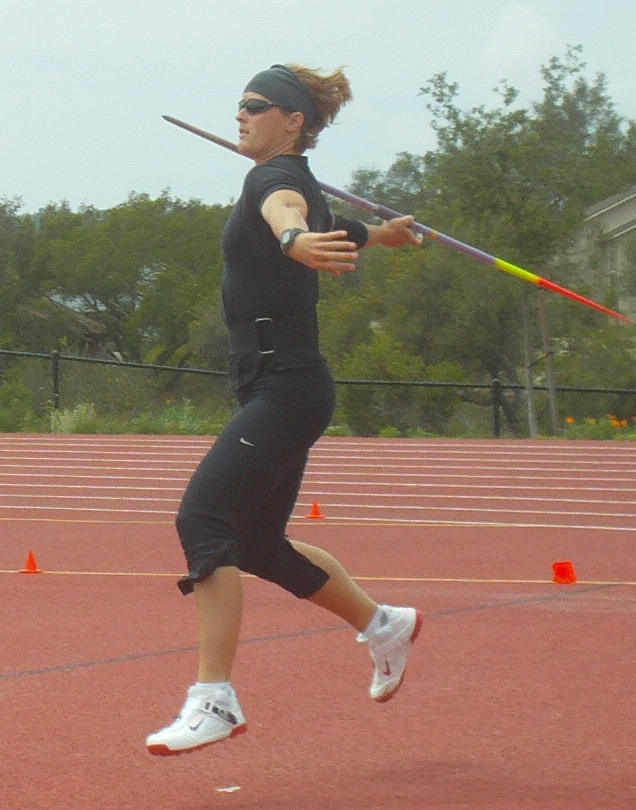

Personal information
- Nationality: American
- Born: 26 July 1977 (age 48) Akron, Ohio
- Height: 1.75 m (5 ft 9 in)
- Weight: 78 kg (172 lb; 12.3 st)

Sport
- Sport: Track and Field
- Club: Nike

Achievements and titles
- Personal best: Javelin Throw: 64.19m
Medal record
Women's athletics
Representing United States
Pan American Games
Gold medal – first place	2003 Santo Domingo	Javelin Throw

Kimberly "Kim" A. Kreiner (born July 26, 1977, in Akron, Ohio) is a female javelin thrower from the United States. Her personal best throw is 64.19 meters, achieved in May 2007 in Fortaleza.

Kreiner competed Mogadore High School where she qualified for the Ohio High School Athletic Association state championships in discus, shot put, and high jump. She walked on the Kent State Golden Flashes track and field team where she became an All-American, placing 3rd in the javelin at the 1997 NCAA Division I Outdoor Track and Field Championships.

She finished fifth at the 2001 Universiade, won the 2003 Pan American Games and finished eighth at the 2006 World Cup. She also competed at the World Championships in 2003 and 2005 as well as the Olympic Games in 2004 and 2008 without reaching the final.

She is a four time National Champion, winning in 2001 and 2004–2006. She held the American record from 2002 until 2010. In 2004, she won the U.S. Olympic Trials.

== International competitions ==
Year	Competition	Venue	Position	Notes
Representing the United States
2001	Universiade	Beijing, China	5th	55.18 m
2003	Pan American Games	Santo Domingo, Dominican Republic	1st	60.86 m
2003	World Championships	Paris, France	21st	54.84 m
2004	Olympic Games	Athens, Greece	39th (q)	52.18 m
2005	World Championships	Helsinki, Finland	21st (q)	55.05 m
2006	IAAF World Cup	Athens, Greece	8th	54.34 m
2008	Olympic Games	Beijing, China	38th (q)	55.13 m
