= Rumyana Karapetrova =

Bulgarian javelin thrower

Personal information
- Native name: Румяна Карапетрова
- Full name: Rumyana Dimitrova Karapetrova
- Nationality: Bulgaria
- Born: 7 February 1982 (age 44)
- Height: 171 cm (5 ft 7 in)
- Weight: 74 kg (163 lb)

Rumyana Karapetrova (Bulgarian: Румяна Карапетрова; born February 7, 1982, in Kazanlak, Stara Zagora, Bulgaria) is a Bulgarian javelin thrower.

She finished sixth at the 2006 European Championships with a career best throw of 61.78 meters. She also finished tenth at the 2005 World Championships, and competed at the 2007 World Championships and the 2008 Olympic Games without reaching the final.

== Achievement ==
Year	Competition	Venue	Position	Notes
Representing Bulgaria
2005	World Championships	Helsinki, Finland	11th	57.06 m
2006	European Championships	Gothenburg, Sweden	6th	61.78 m = PB
2007	World Championships	Osaka, Japan	32nd	48.50 m
