= Song Dan (javelin thrower) =

Chinese javelin thrower (born 1990)

Song Dan (born 5 July 1990 in Wenjiang, Chengdu) is a Chinese female javelin thrower.

Song competed at the 2008 Olympic Games, without reaching the final.

Her personal best throw is 60.68 metres, achieved in March 2008 in Chengdu.
