= Tetyana Lyakhovych =

Ukrainian javelin thrower

Tetyana Mykolaïvna Lyakhovych (Ukrainian: Тетяна Миколаївна Ляхович; born 20 May 1979 in Holyn, Ivano-Frankivsk) is a female javelin thrower from Ukraine. Her personal best throw is 63.23 metres, achieved in July 2008 in Kyiv.

== Achievements ==
Year	Competition	Venue	Position	Notes
Representing Ukraine
1998	World Junior Championships	Annecy, France	8th	52.59 m (old spec.)
1999	European U23 Championships	Gothenburg, Sweden	2nd	57.35 m
2000	Olympic Games	Sydney, Australia	19th	57.41 m
2001	European U23 Championships	Amsterdam, Netherlands	5th	54.04 m
2004	Olympic Games	Athens, Greece	8th	61.75 m
2008	Olympic Games	Beijing, PR China	35th	55.50 m
