= Elisabetta Marin =

Italian javelin thrower

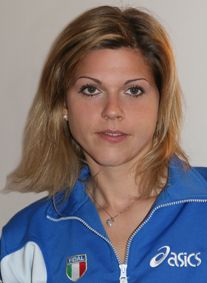

Personal information
- Nationality: Italian
- Born: 5 November 1977 (age 48) Trieste, Italy
- Height: 1.74 m (5 ft 8 1/2 in)
- Weight: 72 kg (159 lb)

Sport
- Country: Italy
- Sport: Athletics
- Event: Javelin throw
- Club: CUS Trieste

Achievements and titles
- Personal best: Javelin throw: 61.77 m (2004)

Elisabetta Marin (born 5 November 1977) is a female javelin thrower from Italy.

== Biography ==
Her personal best throw is 61.77 metres, achieved in June 2004 in Gorizia.

== Achievements ==
| Year | Competition | Venue | Position | Notes |
|---|---|---|---|---|
| 2002 | European Championships | Munich, Germany | 6th | 60.12 m |
| 2003 | Universiade | Daegu, South Korea | 9th | 53.17 m |
| 2004 | Olympic Games | Athens, Greece | 30th (q) | 56.34 m |

== National titles ==
Elisabetta Marin has won 8 times consecutively the individual national championship.

- 1 win in javelin throw (2004)
- 2 wins in javelin throw at the Italian Winter Throwing Championships (2003, 2005)

== See also ==
- Italian all-time lists - Javelin throw
