= Moonika Aava =

Estonian javelin thrower

Personal information
- Nationality: Estonian
- Born: 19 June 1979 (age 47) Rakvere, then part of Estonian SSR, Soviet Union
- Height: 1.68 m (5 ft 6 in)
- Weight: 65 kg (143 lb)

Sport
- Sport: Track and Field
- Event: Javelin throw

Achievements and titles
- Personal best: Javelin: 61.42 m (2004)
Medal record
Women's Athletics
Representing Estonia
European U23 Championships
Bronze medal – third place	2001 Amsterdam	Javelin throw

Moonika Aava (born 19 June 1979) is an Estonian javelin thrower. Her personal best is 61.42 metres achieved on 2 August 2004, in her home country's capital Tallinn. This is the former Estonian record.

She practices athletics with the Pärnu SK Altius club under the supervision of Toomas Merila, her trainer. She won the national championships in 1995, 1996, 2000, 2001 and 2002.

== Achievements ==
Year	Competition	Venue	Position	Result
Representing Estonia
1996	World Junior Championships	Sydney, Australia	16th (q)	49.44 m (old spec.)
1999	European U23 Championships	Gothenburg, Sweden	8th	50.23 m
2001	European U23 Championships	Amsterdam, Netherlands	3rd	56.12 m
2004	Olympic Games	Athens, Greece	33rd	54.96 m
2005	World Championships	Helsinki, Finland	26th	54.24 m
2008	Olympic Games	Beijing, China	26th	56.94 m
2009	World Championships	Berlin, Germany	26th	53.86 m
