= Toomas Merila =

Estonian athletics competitor and coach

Toomas Merila (born 15 August 1939) is an Estonian coach and former javelin thrower.

He was born in Tallinn. In 1963 he graduated from Tartu State University's Institute of Physical Education.

He started his sporting exercising under the guidance of sport club "Spartak" coaches Helmuth Kallik ja Ervin Uuk. He focused on javelin throw. Three times he was a member of Estonian national athletics team.

In 1970 he started his coaching career. 1988–1990 he was the acting chairman of Estonian Athletic Association. He has trained Annika Lall, Ruth Põldots, Andrus Värnik, Moonika Aava, Liina Laasma.

Awards:

- 2000 and 2003: Best Athletics Coach of Estonia
- 2003: Order of the Estonian Red Cross
- 2018: (Estonian: riiklik spordi elutööpreemia)
