= Nora Aída Bicet =

Spanish-Cuban javelin thrower

Personal information
- Born: October 29, 1977 (age 48)
- Height: 1.76 m (5 ft 9 1/2 in)
- Weight: 96 kg (212 lb)

Sport
- Country: Spain
- Sport: Athletics
- Event: Javelin
Medal record
CAC Junior Championships (U20)
Gold medal – first place	1994 Port of Spain	Shot put
Gold medal – first place	1994 Port of Spain	Javelin throw
Silver medal – second place	1996 San Salvador	Javelin throw
- Updated on 11 August 2012

Nora Aída Bicet Juan (born 29 October 1977) is a female Spanish-Cuban javelin thrower.

== Career ==
She finished seventh at the 2004 Olympic Games. Her personal best throw was 63.32 metres, achieved in July 2004 in Tallinn.

== Achievements ==
Year	Competition	Venue	Position	Event	Notes
Representing Cuba
1994	Central American and Caribbean Junior Championships (U-20)	Port of Spain, Trinidad and Tobago	1st	Shot put	12.50 m
1994	Central American and Caribbean Junior Championships (U-20)	Port of Spain, Trinidad and Tobago	1st	Javelin (old spec.)	50.50 m
1996	Central American and Caribbean Junior Championships (U-20)	San Salvador, El Salvador	2nd	Javelin (old spec.)	53.64 m
1996	World Junior Championships	Sydney, Australia	4th	Javelin (old spec.)	55.52 m
2001	Central American and Caribbean Championships	Guatemala City, Guatemala	2nd	Javelin	57.04 m A
2003	World Championships	Paris, France	18th (q)	Javelin	56.33 m
2004	Olympic Games	Athens, Greece	7th	Javelin	62.51 m
2005	World Championships	Helsinki, Finland	24th (q)	Javelin	54.52 m
2005	Central American and Caribbean Championships	Nassau, Bahamas	3rd	Javelin	59.05 m
Representing Spain
2012	European Championships	Helsinki, Finland	16th (q)	Javelin	53.80 m
2012	Olympic Games	London, United Kingdom	25th (q)	Javelin	57.77 m
2013	Mediterranean Games	Mersin, Turkey	3rd	Javelin	57.65 m
