= Aggeliki Tsiolakoudi =

Greek javelin thrower

Aggeliki Tsiolakoudi (Greek: Αγγελική Τσιολακούδη, [aɟeliˈci tsjolaˈkuði], born 10 May 1976 in Alexandroupoli, Greece) is a Greek javelin thrower.

Her personal best throw is 63.14 metres, achieved at the 2002 European Championships in Munich.

Competing for the UTEP Miners track and field team, she won the 2000 NCAA Division I Outdoor Track and Field Championships title in the javelin.

== Achievements ==
Year	Competition	Venue	Position	Event	Notes
Representing Greece
1993	European Junior Championships	San Sebastián, Spain	7th	Javelin throw (old)	53.28 m
1994	World Junior Championships	Lisbon, Portugal	7th	Javelin throw (old)	53.16 m
1995	European Junior Championships	Nyíregyháza, Hungary	3rd	Javelin throw (old)	54.76 m
1997	Mediterranean Games	Bari, Italy	3rd	Javelin throw (old)	56.70 m
1997	World Championships	Athens, Greece	25th (q)	Javelin throw (old)	53.48 m m
2000	Olympic Games	Sydney, Australia	18th (q)	Javelin throw	58.11 m
2001	World Championships	Edmonton, Canada	8th	Javelin throw	61.01 m
2001	Universiade	Beijing, China	4th	Javelin throw	57.15 m
2001	Mediterranean Games	Radès, Tunisia	2nd	Javelin throw	58.16 m
2002	European Championships	Munich, Germany	5th	Javelin throw	63.14 m
2003	World Championships	Paris, France	17th (q)	Javelin throw	56.66 m
2004	Olympic Games	Athens, Greece	19th (q)	Javelin throw	59.64 m
2005	World Championships	Helsinki, Finland	8th	Javelin throw	57.99 m
2005	Mediterranean Games	Almería, Spain	1st	Javelin throw	62.61 m
2005	World Athletics Final	Monte Carlo, Monaco	7th	Javelin throw	58.42 m
2006	European Championships	Gothenburg, Sweden	20th (q)	Javelin throw	55.62 m
