= Alexandra Nasta-Tsisiou =

Cypriot javelin thrower (born 1981)

Personal information
- Nationality: Cyprus
- Born: 2 July 1981 (age 44)
- Height: 1.75 m (5 ft 9 in)
- Weight: 70 kg (154 lb)

Sport
- Sport: Athletics
- Event: Javelin throw

Achievements and titles
- Personal best: Javelin throw: 57.20 m (2006) NR

Alexandra Nasta-Tsisiou (Greek: Αλεξάνδρα Νάστα-Τσισιου; born 2 July 1981) is a Cypriot javelin thrower. Nasta-Tsisiou represented Cyprus at the 2008 Summer Olympics in Beijing, where she competed for the women's javelin throw. She performed the best throw of 53.24 metres, on her first attempt, finishing forty-fifth overall in the qualifying rounds.
