= Olha Ivankova =

Ukrainian javelin thrower

Olha Ivankova (born 7 January 1973) is a Ukrainian javelin thrower. Her personal best throw is 61.68 metres (202 ft 4 in), achieved in the qualifying round of the 2007 World Championships, August 2007 in Osaka. She finished tenth at the 2007 World Championships. She also competed at the 2005 World Championships and the 2008 Olympic Games without reaching the final.

== Achievements ==
Year	Competition	Venue	Position	Notes
Representing Ukraine
2005	World Championships	Helsinki, Finland	18th	56.56 m
2007	World Championships	Osaka, Japan	10th	57.87 m
2008	Olympic Games	Beijing, PR China	25th	57.05 m
