= Savva Lika =

Greek javelin thrower (born 1970)

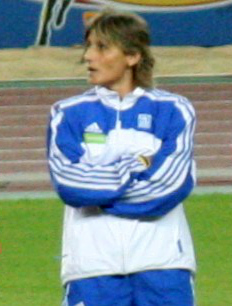
- Savva Lika in Osaka, 2007

Personal information
- Born: 27 June 1970 (age 56)
- Height: 1.68 m (5 ft 6 in)
- Weight: 73 kg (161 lb)

Sport
- Country: Greece
- Sport: Athletics
- Event: Javelin
- Updated on 11 August 2012

Savva Lika (Greek: Σάββα Λίκα, Albanian: Vojsava Lika, born 27 June 1970) is a Greek retired javelin thrower.

== Life and athletic competitions ==
Savva Lika was born Vojsava Lika in Krujë District, Albania, the daughter of ethnic Albanian parents. She is of the Albanian Orthodox faith. She represented Albania prior to 2002. On October 11, 1987, under trained from coach Enver Mysja at only 17, she became champion of Albania and set a new national record of javelin throw with 53.30m.

She migrated to Greece in 1997.

Her personal best throw is 63.13 metres, achieved at the 2007 World Championships, August 2007 in Osaka, Japan, in which she took the 5th place.

She retired after the Hellenic Championship in 2014.

== Honours ==
Year	Competition	Venue	Position	Notes
Representing Greece
2004	Olympic Games	Athens, Greece	9th	60.91 m
2006	European Championships	Gothenburg, Sweden	17th (q)	56.81 m
2006	World Cup	Athens, Greece	6th	
2007	World Championships	Osaka, Japan	5th	63.13 m (PB)
2008	Olympic Games	Beijing, PR China	15th (q)	59.11 m
2009	Mediterranean Games	Pescara, Italy	1st	60.97 m
2009	World Championships	Berlin, Germany	8th	60.29 m
2012	European Championships	Helsinki, Finland	9th	56.25 m
2012	Olympic Games	London, United Kingdom	27th (q)	57.06 m
