= Maryna Novik =

Belarusian javelin thrower

Personal information
- Born: January 19, 1984 (age 42)
- Height: 1.67 m (5 ft 5 1/2 in)
- Weight: 68 kg (150 lb)

Sport
- Country: Belarus
- Sport: Athletics
- Event: Javelin
- Updated on 11 August 2012

Maryna Novik (Belarusian: Марына Новіч; born 19 January 1984) is a female javelin thrower from Belarus. Her personal best throw is 63.25 metres, achieved in August 2009 in Minsk, which is the current national record. She competed at the 2008 Olympic Games but did not qualify for the final. She also competed at the 2012 Summer Olympics in London but again failed to reach the final and finished in 33rd position.
