= Linda Lindqvist =

Finnish footballer

Personal information
- Date of birth: 30 November 1981 (age 44)
- Position: Midfielder

International career
Years	Team	Apps	(Gls)
	Finland	12	(0)

Linda Linqvist (born 3 January 1980) is a retired Finnish footballer. Linqvist spend most of her career at HJK. Linda Linqvist was capped 12 times by the Finnish women's national team.

== International career ==
Lindström was also part of the Finnish team at the 2005 European Championships.
