= Steffi Nerius =

German javelin thrower (born 1972)

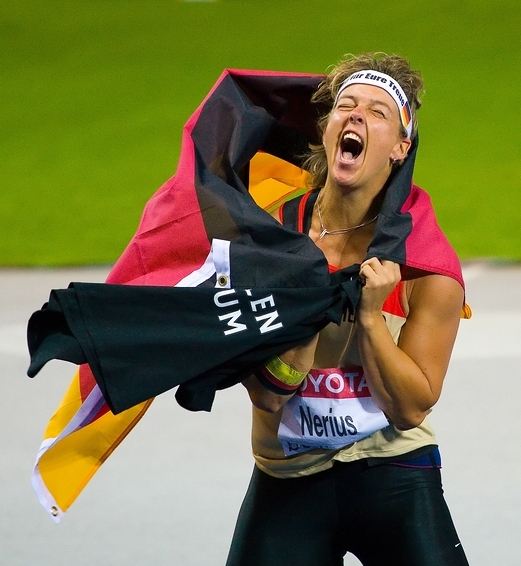
- Nerius at the 2009 World Championships

Personal information
- Born: 1 July 1972 (age 54) Bergen auf Rügen, East Germany
- Height: 1.78 m (5 ft 10 in)
- Weight: 72 kg (159 lb)

Sport
- Country: Germany
- Sport: Track and field
- Event: Javelin throw

Achievements and titles
- Personal best: 68.34 m (2008)
Medal record
Women's athletics
Representing Germany
Olympic Games
Silver medal – second place	2004 Athens	Javelin
World Championships
Gold medal – first place	2009 Berlin	Javelin
Bronze medal – third place	2003 Paris	Javelin
Bronze medal – third place	2005 Helsinki	Javelin
Bronze medal – third place	2007 Osaka	Javelin
European Championships
Gold medal – first place	2006 Göteborg	Javelin
Silver medal – second place	2002 Munich	Javelin

Steffi Nerius (German pronunciation: [ˈʃtɛ.fi ˈneː.ʁi̯ʊs]; born 1 July 1972) is a retired German track and field athlete who competed in the javelin throw. During her career, she was a European and World Champion. She also won silver at the 2004 Summer Olympics. Her personal best throw was 68.34 m, set in 2008. This ranks her second among German female javelin throwers, behind Christina Obergföll.

Initially playing volleyball in school, Nerius later switched to athletics. She was taught the javelin throw by her mother, a former javelin thrower. Her first international success was a bronze medal at the 1991 European Junior Championships. Her first gold medal at a major competition came at the 2006 European Championships. From 2003 to 2006 she won four consecutive German Championships.

== Achievements ==
Year	Competition	Venue	Position	Notes
Representing Germany
1991	European Junior Championships	Thessaloniki, Greece	3rd	54.60 m^{1}
1992	World Cup	Havana, Cuba	6th	56.24 m^{1}
1993	World Championships	Stuttgart, Germany	9th	60.26 m^{1}
1995	World Championships	Gothenburg, Sweden	11th	56.50 m^{1}
1996	Olympic Games	Atlanta, United States	9th	60.20 m^{1}
1997	Universiade	Catania, Italy	5th	59.80 m^{1}
1998	European Championships	Budapest, Hungary	6th	62.08 m^{1}
1999	Universiade	Palma de Mallorca, Spain	4th	58.76 m
1999	World Championships	Seville, Spain	16th (q)	58.43 m
2000	Olympic Games	Sydney, Australia	4th	64.84 m
2001	World Championships	Edmonton, Canada	5th	62.08 m
2002	European Championships	Munich, Germany	2nd	64.09 m
2003	World Championships	Paris, France	3rd	62.70 m
2004	Olympic Games	Athens, Greece	2nd	65.82 m
2005	World Championships	Helsinki, Finland	3rd	65.96 m
2006	European Championships	Gothenburg, Sweden	1st	65.82 m
2007	World Championships	Osaka, Japan	3rd	64.42 m
2008	Olympic Games	Beijing, China	5th	65.29 m
2009	World Championships	Berlin, Germany	1st	67.30 m

^{1}Old model javelin

Sporting positions
Preceded by (Belarus) Natalya Shikolenko	Women's Javelin Best Year Performance; 1996	Succeeded by (Norway) Trine Hattestad
Awards
Preceded by Britta Steffen	German Sportswoman of the Year; 2009	Succeeded by Maria Riesch
