= Annika Petersson =

Swedish javelin thrower (born 1979)

Annika Petersson (born 10 January 1979) is a Swedish javelin thrower.

== Career ==
She competed at the 1998 World Junior Championships and the 2006 European Championships without reaching the final.

Her personal best throw is 57.31 metres, achieved in August 2007 in Eskilstuna. This was the Swedish record before Sofi Flinck, who holds the current record at 61.96.
