= Paula Tarvainen =

Finnish javelin thrower

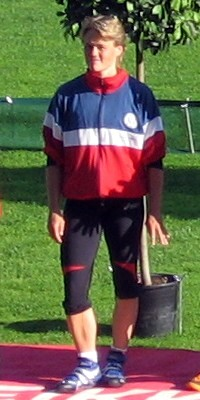
Paula Tarvainen in Kalevan kisat 2008

Paula Tarvainen, née Huhtaniemi (born 17 February 1973) is a Finnish athlete who specializes in the javelin throw.

Tarvainen was born in Pori. Her personal best was 64.90 metres, achieved in August 2003 in Helsinki. It's the Finnish national record with the new javelin model.

== Achievements ==
Year	Competition	Venue	Position	Notes
Representing Finland
2001	World Championships	Edmonton, Canada	13th	58.26 m
2002	European Championships	Munich, Germany	10th	56.24 m
2003	World Championships	Paris, France	20th	55.06 m
2003	World Athletics Final	Monte Carlo, Monaco	8th	
2004	Olympic Games	Athens, Greece	28th	56.88 m
2005	World Championships	Helsinki, Finland	6th	62.64 m
2006	European Championships	Gothenburg, Sweden	11th	55.59 m
2007	World Championships	Osaka, Japan	12th	
