= Nikolett Szabó =

Hungarian javelin thrower

Nikolett Szabó (born 3 March 1980 in Budapest) is a javelin thrower from Hungary. Her personal best throw is 64.62 metres, achieved in July 2001 in Patra.

== Achievements ==
Year	Competition	Venue	Position	Notes
Representing Hungary
1996	World Junior Championships	Sydney, Australia	2nd	58.34 m (old spec.)
1997	European Junior Championships	Ljubljana, Slovenia	1st	61.86 m (old spec.)
1998	World Junior Championships	Annecy, France	4th	58.94 m (old spec.)
1998	European Championships	Budapest, Hungary	8th	60.56 m (old spec.)
1999	European Junior Championships	Riga, Latvia	1st	61.52 m
2000	Olympic Games	Sydney, Australia	14th (q)	58.86 m
2001	European U23 Championships	Amsterdam, Netherlands	1st	60.69 m
2001	World Championships	Edmonton, Canada	14th (q)	57.60 m
2002	European Championships	Munich, Germany	8th	59.28 m
2003	World Championships	Paris, France	12th	56.98 m
2003	World Athletics Final	Szombathely, Hungary	3rd	62.88 m
2004	Olympic Games	Athens, Greece	16th (q)	60.20 m
2004	World Athletics Final	Szombathely, Hungary	8th	58.29 m
2007	Universiade	Bangkok, Thailand	11th	51.62 m
