= Christina Obergföll =

German javelin thrower

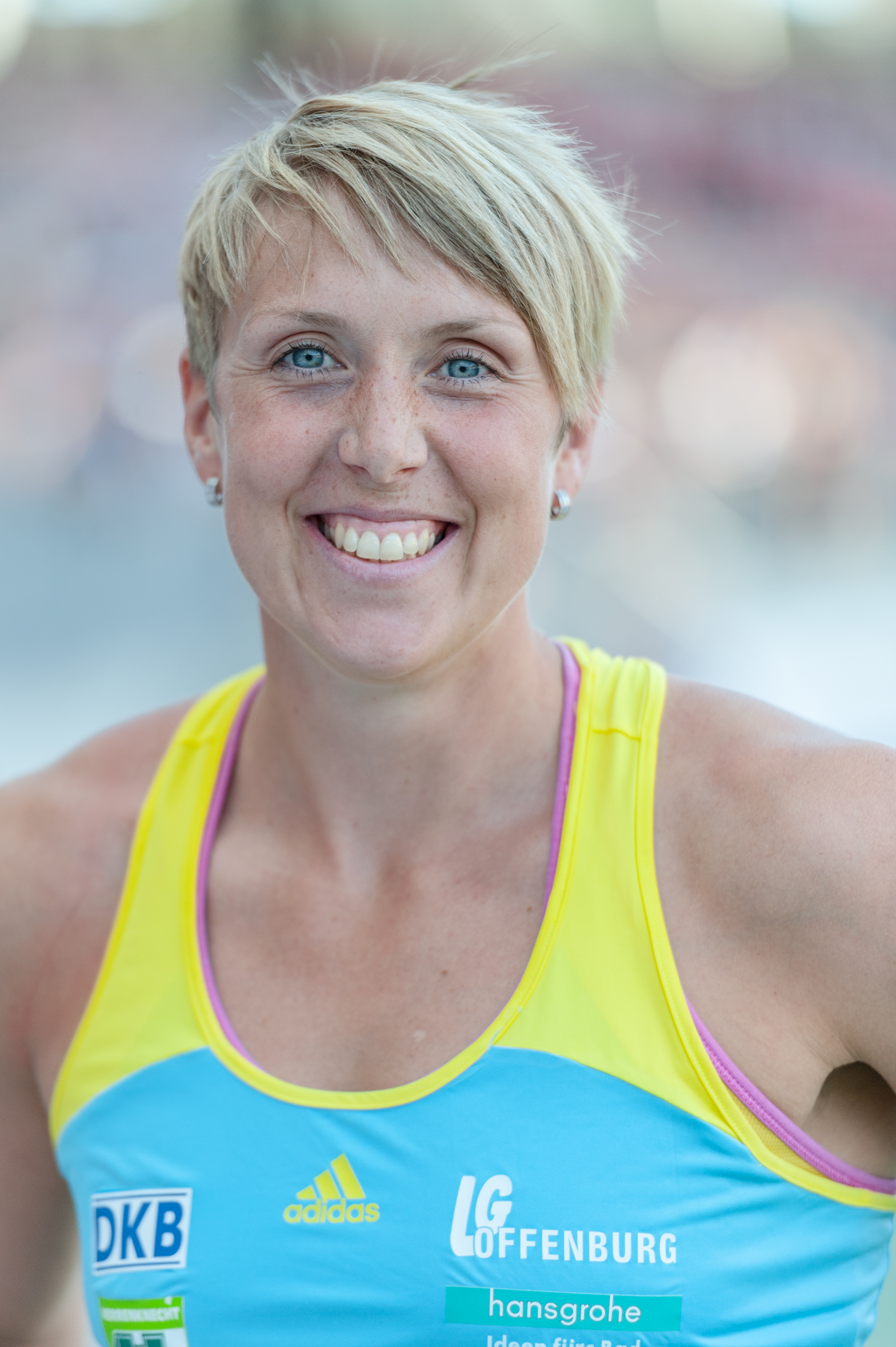
- Obergföll in 2011

Personal information
- Born: 22 August 1981 (age 45) Lahr, West Germany
- Height: 1.75 m (5 ft 9 in)
- Weight: 80 kg (176 lb)
- Spouse: Boris Obergföll (m. 2013)

Sport
- Country: Germany
- Sport: Track and field
- Event: Javelin throw

Achievements and titles
- Personal bests: NR 70.20 m (2007)
Medal record
Olympic Games
Silver medal – second place	2008 Beijing	Javelin throw
Silver medal – second place	2012 London	Javelin throw
World Championships
Gold medal – first place	2013 Moscow	Javelin throw
Silver medal – second place	2005 Helsinki	Javelin throw
Silver medal – second place	2007 Osaka	Javelin throw
Bronze medal – third place	2011 Daegu	Javelin throw
European Championships
Silver medal – second place	2010 Barcelona	Javelin throw
Silver medal – second place	2012 Helsinki	Javelin throw
- Updated on 11 August 2012

Christina Obergföll (German pronunciation: [kʁɪsˈtiːna ˈoːbɐ.kfœl]; born 22 August 1981) is a retired German track and field athlete who competed in the javelin throw. She was World Champion in 2013. Her personal best throw of 70.20 m is the German record. It also ranks her fifth on the overall list.

== Career ==
At the 2005 World Championships in Athletics, Obergföll won the silver medal with a European record (70.03m) by finishing second behind Osleidys Menéndez, who set a new world record at the same event.

Obergföll finished 4th at the 2006 European Athletics Championships in Gothenburg.

With 70.20m, she improved her own European record at the European Cup Super League meeting in Munich on 23 June 2007.

At the 2008 Summer Olympics, she won the silver medal, but lost the European record to Barbora Špotáková.

At the 2012 Olympics in London, she repeated her greatest success, when she won a silver medal.

At the 2013 World Championships in Athletics, which was held in Moscow, Russia, Obergföll got the gold with a mark of 69.05 meters, reaching the success that she was always fighting for. Also in 2013, she married Boris Henry.

Obergföll took 2014 off due to being pregnant, but returned for the 2015 World Championships, where she finished fourth. In 2016, she finished eight at the Olympic Games and retired thereafter.

== Competition record ==
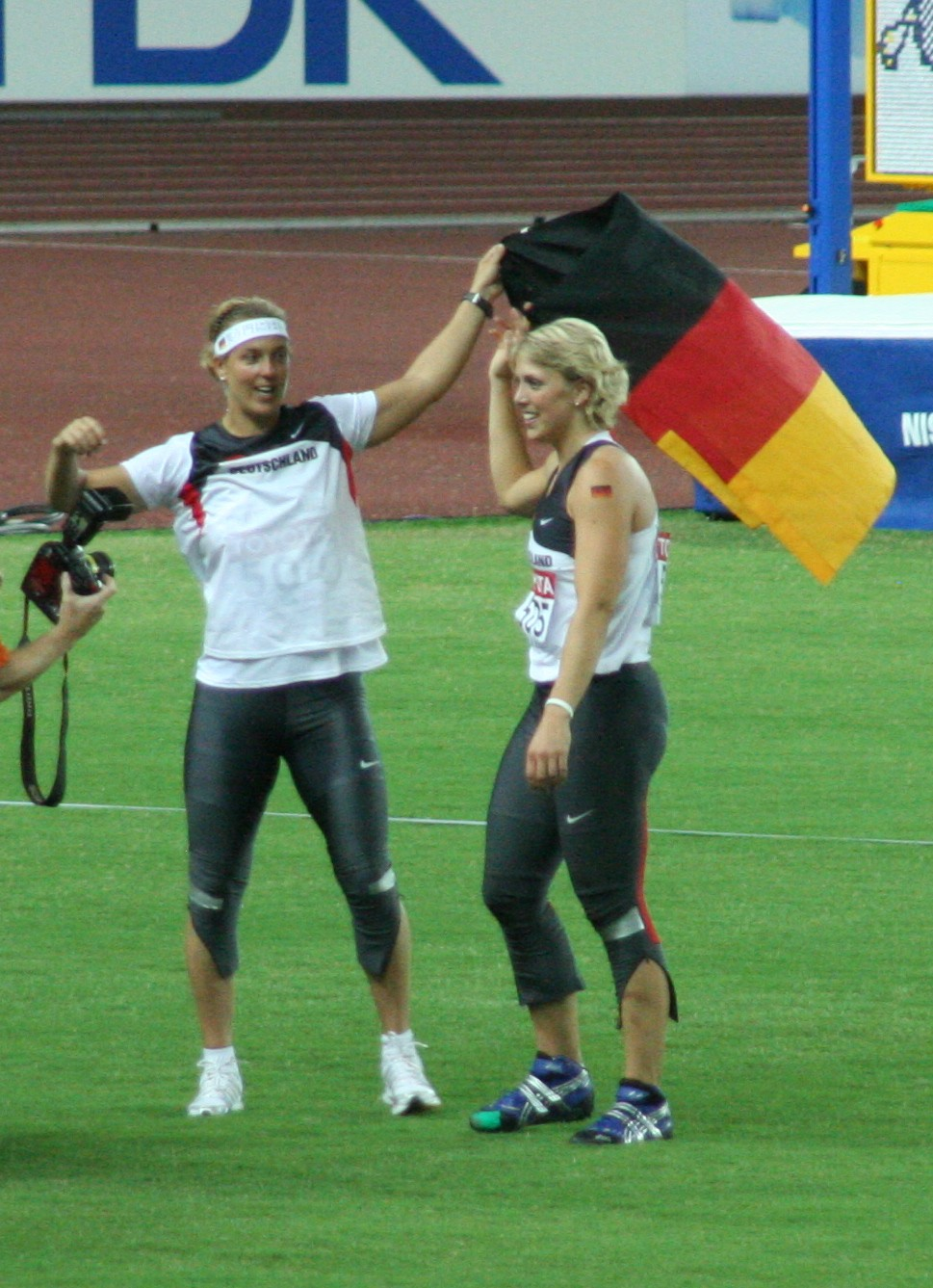
Steffi Nerius and Obergföll celebrating at the 2007 World Championships.

Year	Competition	Venue	Position	Event	Notes
2000	World Junior Championships	Santiago, Chile	8th	Javelin throw	50.23 m
2001	European U23 Championships	Amsterdam, Netherlands	9th	Javelin throw	51.77 m
2003	European U23 Championships	Bydgoszcz, Poland	8th	Javelin throw	54.28 m
2003	Universiade	Daegu, South Korea	8th	Javelin throw	53.38 m
2004	Olympic Games	Athens, Greece	15th (q)	Javelin throw	60.41 m
2005	World Championships	Helsinki, Finland	2nd	Javelin throw	70.03 m
2006	European Championships	Gothenburg, Sweden	4th	Javelin throw	61.89 m
2007	World Championships	Osaka, Japan	2nd	Javelin throw	66.46 m
2008	Olympic Games	Beijing, China	2nd	Javelin throw	66.13 m
2009	World Championships	Berlin, Germany	5th	Javelin throw	64.34 m
2010	European Championships	Barcelona, Spain	2nd	Javelin throw	65.58 m
2011	World Championships	Daegu, South Korea	3rd	Javelin throw	65.24 m
2012	European Championships	Helsinki, Finland	2nd	Javelin throw	65.12 m
2012	Olympic Games	London, United Kingdom	2nd	Javelin throw	65.16 m
2013	World Championships	Moscow, Russia	1st	Javelin throw	69.05 m
2015	World Championships	Beijing, China	4th	Javelin throw	64.61 m
2016	Olympic Games	Rio de Janeiro, Brazil	8th	Javelin throw	62.92 m

Records
Preceded by (Norway) Trine Hattestad	Women's javelin european record holder 14 August 2005 – 21 August 2008	Succeeded by (Czech Republic) Barbora Špotáková
Sporting positions
Preceded by (Cuba) Osleidys Menéndez	Women's Javelin Best Year Performance; 2006, 2007	Succeeded by (Czech Republic) Barbora Špotáková
Awards and achievements
Preceded by Magdalena Neuner	German Sportswoman of the Year; 2013	Succeeded by Maria Höfl-Riesch
