= Serafina Akeli =

Samoan javelin thrower (born 1978)

Personal information
- Full name: Patsy Serafina Akeli
- Nationality: Samoa
- Born: 7 December 1978 (age 47) Motootua, Samoa
- Height: 1.75 m (5 ft 9 in)
- Weight: 89 kg (196 lb)

Sport
- Sport: Athletics
- Event: Javelin throw
- Club: QEII Track Club (AUS)

Achievements and titles
- Personal best: Javelin throw: 54.78 m (2004)
Medal record
Women's athletics
Representing Samoa
(South) Pacific Mini Games
Gold medal – first place	2005 Koror	Javelin
Oceania Championships
Gold medal – first place	2004 Townsville	Javelin
- Updated on 29 April 2013

Patsy Serafina Akeli (née McKenzie) (born 7 December 1978 in Motootua) is a Samoan javelin thrower. She is a two-time Olympian, a 2008 national javelin throw champion, and a member of the QEII Track Club in Australia. She set both a national record and a personal best throw of 54.78 metres, by winning her event at the New Zealand Athletics Championships in Wellington, New Zealand.

Akeli made her official debut for the 2004 Summer Olympics in Athens, where she placed fortieth in the qualifying rounds of the women's javelin throw, at a distance of 45.93 metres.

At the 2006 Commonwealth Games in Melbourne, Australia, Akeli achieved her best career result, when she finished ninth in the final round of the women's javelin, with a best possible throw of 51.25 metres.

At the 2008 Summer Olympics in Beijing, Akeli qualified for the second time in the women's javelin throw. She performed the best throw of 49.26 metres, on her third and final attempt, finishing forty-ninth overall in the qualifying rounds.

== Achievements ==
Year	Competition	Venue	Position	Event	Notes
Representing Samoa
2004	Oceania Championships	Townsville, Australia	1st	Javelin throw	50.22 m CR
2005	South Pacific Mini Games	Koror, Palau	1st	Javelin throw	52.26 m
