= Osleidys Menéndez =

Cuban javelin thrower (born 1979)

Personal information
- Full name: Osleidys Menéndez Sáez
- Born: November 14, 1979 (age 46) Martí, Matanzas, Cuba
- Height: 1.75 m (5 ft 9 in)
- Weight: 80 kg (176 lb)

Sport
- Country: Cuba
- Sport: Track and field
- Event: Javelin throw

Achievements and titles
- Personal bests: NACACR 71.70 m (2006)
Medal record
Women's Athletics
Representing Cuba
Olympic Games
Gold medal – first place	2004 Athens	Javelin
Bronze medal – third place	2000 Sydney	Javelin
World Championships
Gold medal – first place	2001 Edmonton	Javelin
Gold medal – first place	2005 Helsinki	Javelin
Pan American Games
Gold medal – first place	1999 Winnipeg	Javelin
Gold medal – first place	2007 Rio de Janeiro	Javelin
Bronze medal – third place	2003 Santo Domingo	Javelin
Universiade
Gold medal – first place	2001 Beijing	Javelin
- Updated on 17 June 2013

Osleidys Menéndez Sáez (Spanish pronunciation: [osˈlejðis meˈnendes ˈsaes]; born November 14, 1979) is a retired Cuban track and field athlete who competed in the javelin throw. She was a World and Olympic Champion, and held the world record from 2001 to 2008. Her personal best of 71.70 m remains the North, Central American and Caribbean record and ranks her third on the overall list.

When winning the 2005 World Athletics Championships, Menéndez broke her own world record with a throw of 71.70 m. This record was broken by Olympic champion Barbora Špotáková in September 2008 with a throw of 72.28 m.

She won the Cuban National Games in 2004.

== Personal bests ==
- Javelin throw: 71.70 m – Helsinki, Finland, 14 August 2005

== International competitions ==
Representing Cuba
Year	Competition	Venue	Position	Event	Notes
1994	Central American and Caribbean Junior Championships (U-17)	Port of Spain, Trinidad and Tobago	1st	Javelin	47.32 m
1995	Pan American Junior Championships	Santiago, Chile	1st	Javelin	51.30 m
1996	Central American and Caribbean Junior Championships (U-20)	San Salvador, El Salvador	1st	Javelin	59.98 m
1996	World Junior Championships	Sydney, Australia	1st	Javelin	60.96 m
1997	Pan American Junior Championships	Havana, Cuba	1st	Javelin	61.76 m
1997	Central American and Caribbean Championships	San Juan, Puerto Rico	1st	Javelin	63.08 m
1997	World Championships	Athens, Greece	7th	Javelin	63.76 m
1998	Central American and Caribbean Games	Maracaibo, Venezuela	2nd	Javelin	62.06 m
1998	World Junior Championships	Annecy, France	1st	Javelin	68.17 m
1999	Pan American Games	Winnipeg, Canada	1st	Javelin	65.85 m
1999	World Championships	Seville, Spain	4th	Javelin	64.61 m
2000	Olympic Games	Sydney, Australia	3rd	Javelin	66.18 m
2001	World Championships	Edmonton, Canada	1st	Javelin	69.53 m CR
2001	Universiade	Beijing, China	1st	Javelin	69.82 m UR
2001	Goodwill Games	Brisbane, Australia	1st	Javelin	66.14 m
2002	IAAF World Cup	Madrid, Spain	1st	Javelin	64.41 m
2003	Pan American Games	Santo Domingo, Dominican Republic	3rd	Javelin	60.20 m
2003	World Championships	Paris, France	5th	Javelin	62.19 m
2004	Ibero-American Championships	Huelva, Spain	1st	Javelin	66.99 m CR
2004	Olympic Games	Athens, Greece	1st	Javelin	71.53 m OR
2004	IAAF World Athletics Final	Fontvieille, Monaco	1st	Javelin	66.20 m
2005	World Championships	Helsinki, Finland	1st	Javelin	71.70 m WR
2005	IAAF World Athletics Final	Fontvieille, Monaco	1st	Javelin	67.24 m
2006	Central American and Caribbean Games	Cartagena, Colombia	2nd	Javelin	59.94 m
2007	ALBA Games	Caracas, Venezuela	2nd	Javelin	58.98 m
2007	Pan American Games	Rio de Janeiro, Brazil	1st	Javelin	62.34 m SB
2008	Olympic Games	Beijing, China	6th	Javelin	63.35 m
2009	ALBA Games	Havana, Cuba	2nd	Javelin	58.09 m
2009	Central American and Caribbean Championships	Havana, Cuba	2nd	Javelin	59.68 m
2009	World Championships	Berlin, Germany	7th	Javelin	63.11 m
2009	IAAF World Athletics Final	Thessaloniki, Greece	5th	Javelin	59.93 m

Sporting positions
Preceded by Trine Hattestad; Miréla Manjani	Women's Javelin Best Year Performance; 2001; 2004	Succeeded by Miréla Manjani; Christina Obergföll
