= Athletics at the 2004 Summer Olympics – Women's javelin throw =

Women's javelin throw at the Games of the XXVIII Olympiad
- Olympic Athletics
- Venue: Olympic Stadium
- Dates: 25–27 August
- Competitors: 45 from 31 nations
- Winning distance: 71.53 OR

Medalists
1st place, gold medalist(s)		Osleidys Menéndez	Cuba
2nd place, silver medalist(s)		Steffi Nerius	Germany
3rd place, bronze medalist(s)		Miréla Manjani	Greece

The women's javelin throw competition at the 2004 Summer Olympics in Athens was held at the Olympic Stadium on 25–27 August.

== Competition format ==
Each athlete receives three throws in the qualifying round. All who achieve the qualifying distance progress to the final. If less than twelve athletes achieve this mark, then the twelve furthest throwing athletes reach the final. Each finalist is allowed three throws in last round, with the top eight athletes after that point being given three further attempts.

== Schedule ==
All times are Greece Standard Time (UTC+2)

Date	Time	Round
Wednesday, 25 August 2004	19:00	Qualification
Friday, 27 August 2004	20:55	Final

== Records ==
Prior to the competition, the existing world record, Olympic record, and world leading mark were as follows:

World record	Osleidys Menéndez (CUB)	71.54 m	Rethymno, Greece	1 July 2001
Olympic record	Trine Hattestad (NOR)	68.91 m	Sydney, Australia	30 September 2000
World Leading	Osleidys Menéndez (CUB)	68.23 m	Havana, Cuba	5 March 2004

The following record was established during the competition:

Date	Event	Name	Nationality	Result	Record
27 August	Final	Osleidys Menéndez	Cuba	71.53 m	OR

== Results ==
=== Qualifying round ===
Rule: Qualifying standard 61.00 (Q) or at least best 12 qualified (q).

Rank	Group	Name	Nationality	#1	#2	#3	Result	Notes
1	A	Osleidys Menéndez	Cuba	64.91	—	—	64.91	Q
2	B	Nikola Brejchová	Czech Republic	64.39	—	—	64.39	Q
3	A	Tetyana Lyakhovych	Ukraine	59.43	57.35	63.07	63.07	Q, NR
4	A	Savva Lika	Greece	58.29	62.22	—	62.22	Q
5	A	Steffi Nerius	Germany	57.67	60.30	62.14	62.14	Q
6	B	Laverne Eve	Bahamas	62.11	—	—	62.11	Q, SB
7	A	Felicia Țilea-Moldovan	Romania	52.10	59.06	62.05	62.05	Q
8	B	Sonia Bisset	Cuba	61.45	—	—	61.45	Q
9	A	Barbara Madejczyk	Poland	59.20	61.18	—	61.18	Q
10	A	Taina Kolkkala	Finland	61.16	—	—	61.16	Q
11	A	Miréla Manjani	Greece	56.92	x	61.04	61.04	Q, SB
12	B	Noraida Bicet	Cuba	59.45	60.61	60.97	60.97	q
13	B	Mikaela Ingberg	Finland	60.70	59.08	60.80	60.80	
14	A	Claudia Coslovich	Italy	60.58	x	x	60.58	
15	A	Christina Obergföll	Germany	60.41	58.47	56.67	60.41	
16	B	Nikolett Szabó	Hungary	60.20	59.06	54.60	60.20	
17	B	Zuleima Araméndiz	Colombia	58.77	58.99	59.94	59.94	PB
18	A	Ma Ning	China	59.80	55.30	57.03	59.80	SB
19	B	Aggeliki Tsiolakoudi	Greece	56.21	57.88	59.64	59.64	
20	B	Katherine Sayers	Great Britain	59.11	53.64	x	59.11	
21	B	Annika Suthe	Germany	58.70	56.81	55.62	58.70	
22	A	Mercedes Chilla	Spain	54.12	x	58.45	58.45	
23	A	Barbora Špotáková	Czech Republic	55.39	58.20	x	58.20	
24	B	Aïda Sellam	Tunisia	57.76	52.77	53.22	57.76	
25	A	Jarmila Klimešová	Czech Republic	55.89	55.62	57.70	57.70	
26	B	Oksana Yarygina	Russia	57.57	54.20	50.28	57.57	
27	A	Valeriya Zabruskova	Russia	57.51	57.53	55.47	57.53	
28	A	Paula Tarvainen	Finland	56.88	x	x	56.88	
29	B	Christina Scherwin	Denmark	56.79	55.26	56.86	56.86	
30	B	Elisabetta Marin	Italy	54.43	x	56.34	56.34	
31	B	Rita Ramanauskaitė	Lithuania	55.17	x	x	55.17	
32	B	Hristina Georgieva	Bulgaria	49.69	54.65	55.13	55.13	
33	B	Moonika Aava	Estonia	x	53.41	54.96	54.96	
34	A	Ilze Gribule	Latvia	54.82	54.92	51.95	54.92	
35	B	Sunette Viljoen	South Africa	52.71	54.45	53.28	54.45	
36	A	Chang Jung-yeon	South Korea	x	50.54	53.93	53.93	
37	B	Xue Juan	China	52.97	x	x	52.97	
38	B	Liliya Dusmetova	Uzbekistan	49.86	50.92	52.46	52.46	
39	B	Kim Kreiner	United States	52.18	x	51.46	52.18	
40	A	Dalila Rugama	Nicaragua	47.81	51.42	46.18	51.42	
41	A	Natallia Shymchuk	Belarus	51.23	x	48.11	51.23	
42	A	Leryn Franco	Paraguay	49.17	48.20	50.37	50.37	
43	A	Romina Maggi	Argentina	46.00	48.57	48.58	48.58	
44	B	Serafina Akeli	Samoa	45.93	45.64	43.84	45.93	
	A	Yekaterina Ivakina	Russia	x	x	—	NM	

=== Final ===
Rank	Name	Nationality	1	2	3	4	5	6	Result	Notes
1st place, gold medalist(s)	Osleidys Menéndez	Cuba	71.53	x	65.41	68.60	63.64	—	71.53	OR
2nd place, silver medalist(s)	Steffi Nerius	Germany	63.02	60.58	x	x	63.60	65.82	65.82	PB
3rd place, bronze medalist(s)	Miréla Manjani	Greece	62.29	63.61	x	62.20	x	64.29	64.29	SB
4	Nikola Brejchová	Czech Republic	62.46	63.77	64.23	x	63.77	62.55	64.23	
5	Sonia Bisset	Cuba	61.93	59.58	60.39	60.32	60.20	63.54	63.54	
6	Laverne Eve	Bahamas	57.25	58.09	62.77	58.50	x	59.02	62.77	SB
7	Noraida Bicet	Cuba	62.36	60.64	60.70	62.51	60.41	61.61	62.51	
8	Tetyana Lyakhovych	Ukraine	59.52	57.26	61.75	x	57.39	55.70	61.75	
9	Savva Lika	Greece	58.58	60.91	60.53				60.91	
10	Taina Kolkkala	Finland	60.72	58.53	60.69				60.72	
11	Felicia Țilea-Moldovan	Romania	58.04	57.42	59.72				59.72	
12	Barbara Madejczyk	Poland	54.54	56.43	58.22				58.22	
