= Christina Scherwin =

Danish javelin thrower

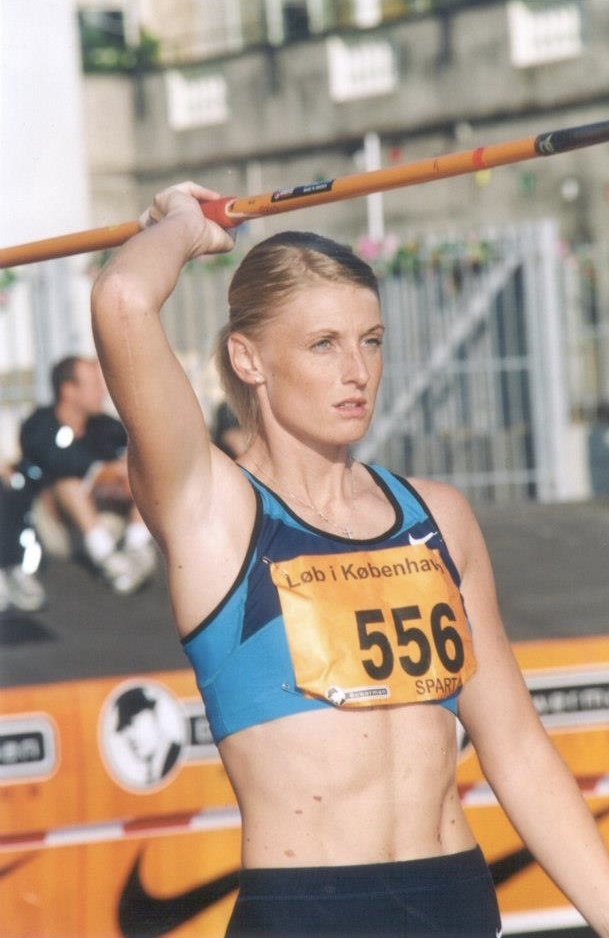
Javelin thrower Christina Scherwin

Christina Scherwin (born 11 July 1976) is a Danish former javelin thrower and two-time Olympian. She is the Danish record holder in women's javelin.

== Career ==
In her junior years Scherwin placed 6th at the 1993 European Junior Championships and 5th at the 1994 World Junior Championships. She was the NCAA Division III national women's javelin champion with Moravian University in 2002 and 2003, as well as record-holder. At the 2003 World University games in Daegu she finished second, throwing 56.08 metres. Scherwin represented Sparta at club level.

In July 2004 Scherwin qualified for the javelin at the Athens 2004 Summer Olympics by throwing 59.36 metres, a Danish national record. She threw 56.86 metres at the Olympics, placing her 29th overall.

In July 2005 Scherwin threw the javelin 61.68 metres at the Danish national championships, breaking her national record. At August's 2005 World Championships in Helsinki, she threw the javelin 63.43 meters, placing fourth overall in the event. In September 2005 she finished sixth at the 2005 World Athletics Final in Monaco.

In 2006 Scherwin finished fifth at the 2006 European Championships in Gothenburg. She followed that up by a third-place at September's 2006 World Athletics Final in Stuttgart, where she threw a Danish record of 64.83 meters, which broke the previous record by almost a metre.

Scherwin retired from top competition in 2008 after the conclusion of the 2008 Summer Olympics, in which she threw 53.95 metres.

In 2009 Scherwin joined the University of Oregon on a voluntary basis working as a javelin coach.
