= Barbora Špotáková =

Czech javelin thrower

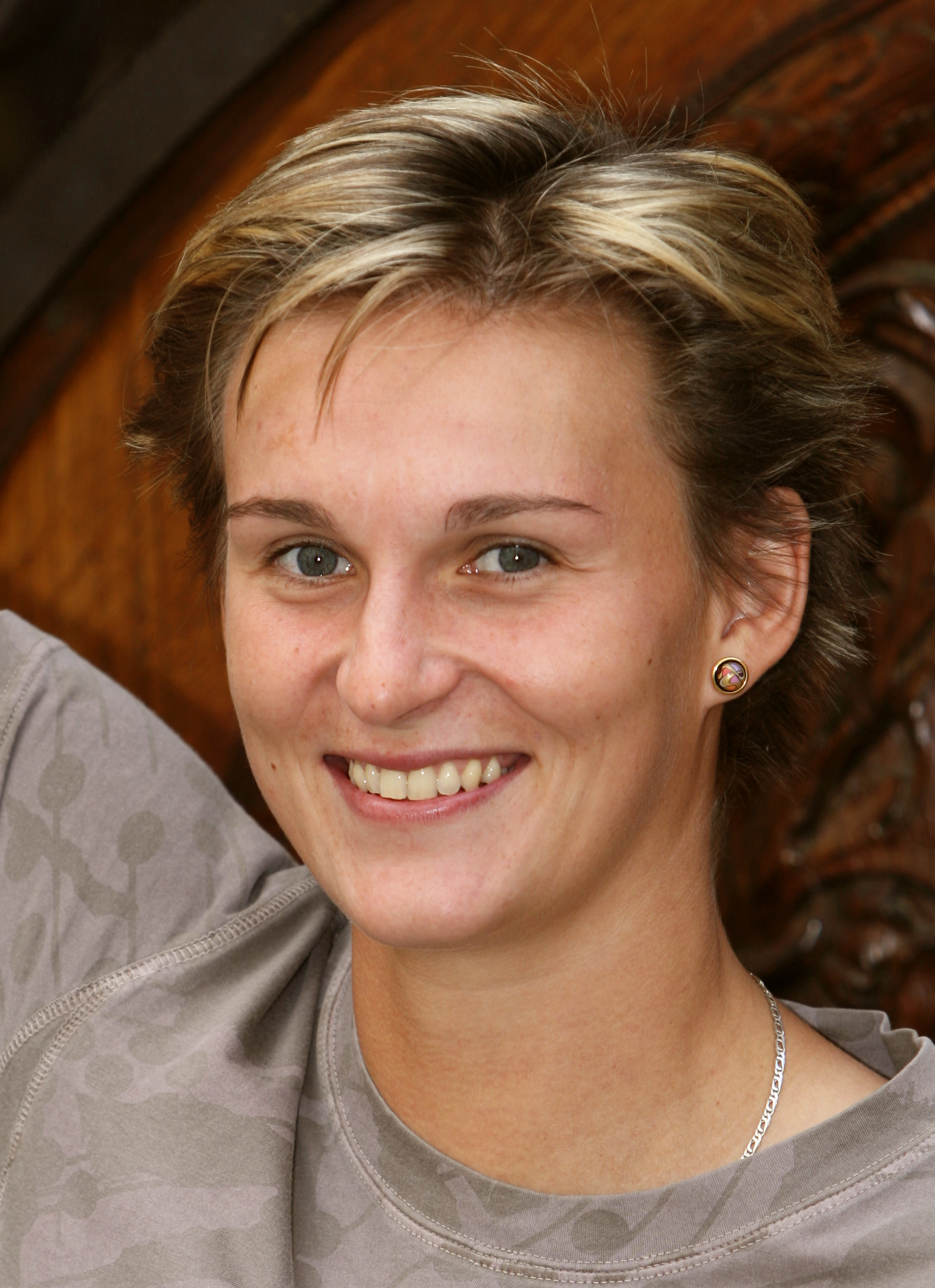
- Barbora Špotáková in 2007

Personal information
- Born: 30 June 1981 (age 45) Jablonec nad Nisou, Czechoslovakia
- Height: 1.82 m (6 ft 0 in)
- Weight: 80 kg (176 lb)

Sport
- Country: Czech Republic
- Sport: Athletics
- Event: Javelin throw
Medal record
Event	1st	2nd	3rd
Olympic Games	2	0	1
World Championships	3	1	0
European Championships	1	1	2
Continental Cup	1	0	0
Universiade	1	0	0
Total	8	2	3
Olympic Games
Gold medal – first place	2008 Beijing	Javelin throw
Gold medal – first place	2012 London	Javelin throw
Bronze medal – third place	2016 Rio de Janeiro	Javelin throw
World Championships
Gold medal – first place	2007 Osaka	Javelin throw
Gold medal – first place	2011 Daegu	Javelin throw
Gold medal – first place	2017 London	Javelin throw
Silver medal – second place	2009 Berlin	Javelin throw
European Championships
Gold medal – first place	2014 Zurich	Javelin throw
Silver medal – second place	2006 Gothenburg	Javelin throw
Bronze medal – third place	2010 Barcelona	Javelin throw
Bronze medal – third place	2022 Munich	Javelin throw
Universiade
Gold medal – first place	2005 İzmir	Javelin throw
Continental Cup
Gold medal – first place	2014 Marrakesh	Javelin throw
Diamond League
Gold medal – first place	2010	Javelin throw
Gold medal – first place	2012	Javelin throw
Gold medal – first place	2014	Javelin throw
Gold medal – first place	2015	Javelin throw
Gold medal – first place	2017	Javelin throw

Barbora Špotáková (Czech pronunciation: [ˈbarbora ˈʃpotaːkovaː]; born 30 June 1981) is a former Czech track and field athlete who competed in the javelin throw. She is a two-time Olympic Champion and three-time World Champion, as well as the current world record holder with a throw of 72.28 m.

== Career ==
Špotáková was a heptathlete in her early career, finishing fourth at the 2000 World Junior Championships. She also won the International Combined Events Meeting in Hexham in 2000 before she went on to study in the US and specialise in Javelin throwing. In September 2004, Špotáková scored 6749 points at a women's decathlon in Talence to set a Czech record in the event.

She was an All-American during her one season at the University of Minnesota in 2001–02, and won the silver medal at the 2006 European Championships in Gothenburg.

Špotáková improved the Czech national record (previously 66.21 m held by herself since 2006) twice in the final of the 2007 World Championships in Osaka. She took an early lead for 66.40 m in the first attempt and secured the gold medal in the third attempt (67.07 m) before German Christina Obergföll (66.46 m). Špotáková became the seventh woman in the world to reach the 67 m mark. At the 2008 Olympics, she won the gold medal, taking the lead with her last throw, 71.42 m, which set a new European record. At the 2008 IAAF World Athletics Final on 13 September 2008, Špotáková broke the world record in the first round to win the competition with a throw of 72.28 m.

Until the end of the 2010 season she was coached by Rudolf Černý, who led her from a national elite level heptathlete to the World Record in the Women's Javelin. Prior to the 2011 season it was announced that Jan Železný would take over as her coach. At the end of 2010 she won the Czech Athletics Federation's annual poll for "Athlete of the Year" for the fourth year in a row. Then she won it again in 2011, making it five years in a row. She won her second Olympic gold medal at the 2012 London Olympics.

Špotáková gave birth to a son in May 2013 and did not compete at the world championships in Moscow later that year. In 2014, she won the European Championships in Zurich, Switzerland, with a throw of 64.41 m.

Špotáková reunited with her former coach Rudolf Černý in 2015 to train for the Olympic Games in Rio de Janeiro in 2016, where she won the bronze medal with a throw of 64.80m.

On 9 September 2022, Špotáková announced her retirement from professional sport.

== Personal life ==
Špotáková was born in Jablonec nad Nisou, later she moved to Prague. Since 2014, she has been living in Unhošť.

== Achievements ==
Year	Competition	Venue	Position	Notes
Representing the Czech Republic
2000	World Junior Championships	Santiago, Chile	4th	5689 pts (Heptathlon)
2003	European U23 Championships	Bydgoszcz, Poland	6th	56.65 m
2004	Olympic Games	Athens, Greece	23rd	58.20 m
2005	Universiade	İzmir, Turkey	1st	60.73 m
2005	World Athletics Final	Monte Carlo, Monaco	5th	61.60 m
2006	European Championships	Gothenburg, Sweden	2nd	66.12 m PB
2006	World Athletics Final	Stuttgart, Germany	1st	66.21 m NR
2007	World Championships	Osaka, Japan	1st	67.07 m NR
2007	World Athletics Final	Stuttgart, Germany	1st	67.12 m NR
2008	Olympic Games	Beijing, China	1st	71.42 m AR
2008	World Athletics Final	Stuttgart, Germany	1st	72.28 m WR
2009	World Championships	Berlin, Germany	2nd	66.42 m
2009	World Athletics Final	Thessaloniki, Greece	2nd	63.45 m
2010	European Championships	Barcelona, Spain	3rd	65.36 m
2011	World Championships	Daegu, South Korea	1st	71.58 m (Note: Gold medal inherited in 2018 after Mariya Abakumova's disqualification for doping.)
2012	Olympic Games	London, United Kingdom	1st	69.55 m
2014	European Championships	Zurich, Switzerland	1st	64.41 m
2014	IAAF Continental Cup	Marrakesh, Morocco	1st	65.52 m
2015	World Championships	Beijing, China	9th	60.08 m
2016	Olympic Games	Rio de Janeiro, Brazil	3rd	64.80 m
2017	World Championships	London, United Kingdom	1st	66.76 m
2019	World Championships	Doha, Qatar	9th	59.87 m
2021	Olympic Games	Tokyo, Japan	14th (q)	60.52 m
2022	European Championships	Munich, Germany	3rd	60.68 m

== Notes ==
Records
Preceded by (Germany) Christina Obergföll	Women's javelin european record holder 21 August 2008 – present	Succeeded by Incumbent
Preceded by (Cuba) Osleidys Menéndez	Women's javelin world record holder 13 September 2008 – present	Succeeded by Incumbent
Awards
Preceded by Martina Sáblíková; Petra Kvitová	Czech Athlete of the Year; 2008; 2012	Succeeded by Martina Sáblíková; Zuzana Hejnová
