= Sharon Gibson =

English athlete (born 1961)

Personal information
- Nationality: British (English)
- Born: 31 December 1961 (age 64) Mapperley, England
- Height: 168 cm (5 ft 6 in)
- Weight: 77 kg (170 lb)

Sport
- Sport: Athletics
- Event: javelin
- Club: Notts AC
Medal record
Athletics
Representing England
Commonwealth Games
Bronze medal – third place	1994 Victoria	javelin

Sharon Angela Gibson (born 31 December 1961) is an English former athlete who competed in the women's javelin throw event during her career.

== Biography ==
Gibson twice represented Great Britain at the Summer Olympics: 1984 and 1988. Gibson was affiliated with the Notts Athletic Club.

Gibson represented England in the javelin event, at the 1982 Commonwealth Games in Brisbane, Australia. Eight years later she represented England in the javelin again and finished fourth, at the 1990 Commonwealth Games in Auckland, New Zealand. A further four years later and at her third Commonwealth games she finally won a medal when winning the bronze at the 1994 Commonwealth Games in Victoria, in the province of British Columbia in Canada.

At national level Gibson was twice the British javelin throw champion after winning the British AAA Championships title at the 1988 AAA Championships and 1991 AAA Championships but was unfortunate to have competed in an era when two of the world's best javelin throwers were British and Fatima Whitbread and Tessa Sanderson denied her many more titles.

== International competitions ==
Year	Competition	Venue	Position	Notes
Representing the Great Britain and England
1982	Commonwealth Games	Brisbane, Australia	7th	49.56 m
1984	Olympic Games	Los Angeles, United States	9th	59.66 m
1988	Olympic Games	Seoul, South Korea	25th (q)	56.00 m
1990	Commonwealth Games	Auckland, New Zealand	4th	57.26 m
1990	European Championships	Split, Yugoslavia	15th (q)	55.98 m
1994	European Championships	Helsinki, Finland	17th (q)	53.82 m
1994	Commonwealth Games	Victoria, Canada	3rd	58.20 m
(q) indicates overall position in qualifying round
