= The Gateway Academy, Essex =

The Gateway Academy
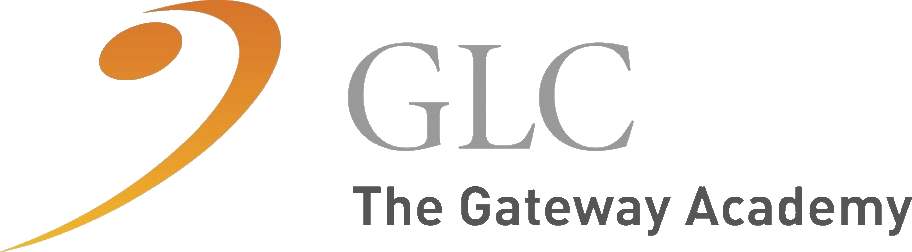

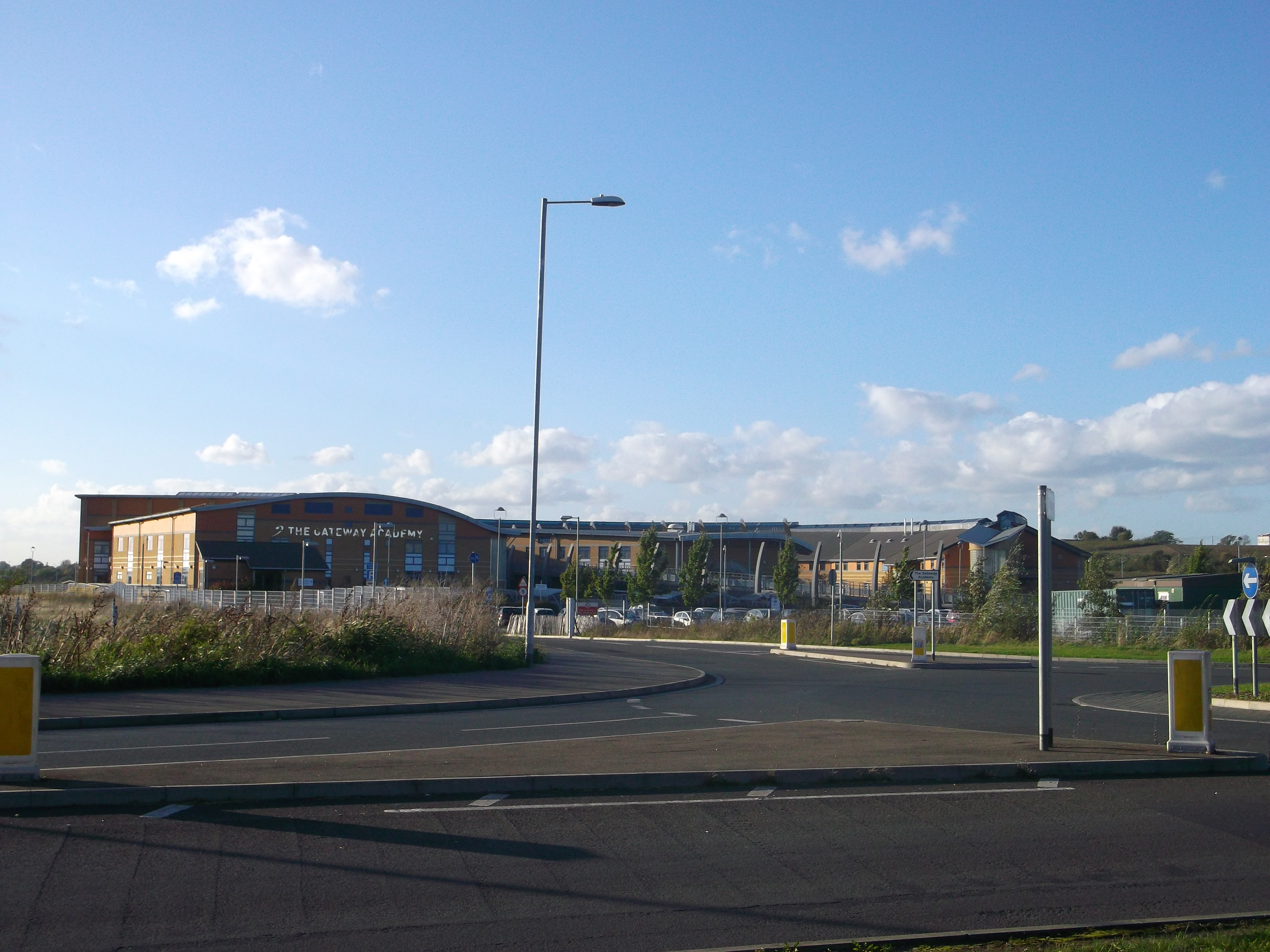

Location
- Marshfoot Road; Grays, Essex, RM16 4LU; England; 51.4757°N 0.3642°E

Information
- Type: Academy
- Motto: "All Different: All Equal: Together Improving Upon Our Best" "We were not born to be average, we were born to be exceptional we are the Gateway Academy"
- Established: 1 September 2003 (from amalgamation)
- Local authority: Thurrock Council
- Specialists: Arts, Design and Engineering
- Department for Education URN: 133114 Tables
- Ofsted: Reports
- Chair: Hilary Hodgson
- Executive Principal: Vicki Reid (CEO of GLC)
- Head of School: Grainne McLaughlin
- Vice Principal(s): J. Bonnett; N. Hunnisett; J. Moruzzi
- Gender: Coeducational
- Age: 11 to 16
- Enrolment: 1048
- Capacity: 1035
- Publication: Gateway Times
- Website: thegatewayacademy.org.uk

The Gateway Academy, formerly The Gateway Community College, is a coeducational academy secondary school in Grays, Essex, England. It became an academy in 2006 under the sponsorship of the Ormiston Trust after Thurrock Council was unable to find the resources to provide a new building. It was previously a successful fresh start school which was created from two failing secondary schools; Torells School in Grays and St Chad's School in Tilbury. It is currently a part of The Gateway Learning Community (GLC) but has retained its Ormiston sponsorship.

Although the school's address falls under Grays in actuality it is located between, and primarily serves, Chadwell St Mary and Tilbury. The school was previously located across two campuses, the old Torells School site and St Chad's School site in Grays and Tilbury respectively. On 17 June 2008 the school relocated to a new £38 million campus, shaped as a "G", which is where the school is currently located today. The school used to have a sixth form which closed in 2014 and currently hosts The Gateway Primary Free School which opened in 2012. The school has also operated a free summer school since 2011 which serves Year 6 and Year 7 students.

== History ==
=== 1930s–2003 ===
St Chad's School

The St Chad's School likely opened sometime in the 1930s as this was when the school's first buildings were built and extended. By the 1940s the school site was split between the St Chad's Secondary Girls School and the St Chad's School For Boys. From 1948 it was unified as the St Chad's County Secondary School but the male and female pupils were segregated and taught in their own "departments" until 1955. In the 1970s one of the school's PE teachers was Margaret Whitbread, the later adopted mother of Fatima Whitbread, who at this time was attending Torells.

By the 2000s the school was a secondary community school and was officially named St Chad's School. A teacher who spent a week there reported that fights and racism were common in the school and that drugs were being distributed. From 2002, it had a language specialism. It was ranked as special measures and it was failing with only 9% of students getting an A* to a C in their GCSE grades and 29% leaving the school without a single pass. It officially closed on 31 August 2003 and its last headteacher was A. L. Swift.

Torells School

Torells School opened in September 1951 as a secondary school. In its early years it was often confused with nearby Tyrrells Heath Infant and Juniors because of the similar names and close opening dates (Tyrells opened less than a year later on 28 April 1952). This confusion ended when Tyrells became Woodside Primary. In the 1970s it was called Torells Comprehensive School and during this time the future celebrities Joe Pasquale and Fatima Whitbread both attended. The school produced three feature films, Torells School 1972 (1972), The Seedlings (1976) and Year of the Dot (1984).

By the 2000s the school was on special measures and was officially named Torells School. It was also previously a grant-maintained foundation school with a possible technology specialism. The school was failing in its final years with only 17% of students achieving A* to C in GCSE grades. The last headteacher was Lynn Adams and the school closed a final time on 31 August 2003.

=== 2003–2011 ===
The Gateway Community College opened on 1 September 2003 when the failed Torells School and St Chad's School merged into what was intended to be a school with an overall student capacity of 1687 students. Despite these initial plans The Gateway Community College would instead only have a capacity of 1200. The headteacher was Mark Morrall. On 16 March 2006 an application directed to Thurrock Council called for the complete demolition of the Torells site, replacing it with new buildings meant to facilitate the relocation of two nearby special schools, Treetops School and Beacon Hill School. The application also included the construction of a new post-16 facility. The application was approved and the Torells site was demolished by 2009.

From March 2006 the school began preparations to become the first academy in Essex ahead of the school's relocation to the current site on Marshfoot Road. The headteacher, Mark Morrall, intended to continue his role upon academisation but was denied the position by the Ormiston Trust and DfES, therefore being forced to step down in the summer. It was decided that the school was to have a new management structure consisting of a head of school (Gary Pratt) and executive principal (Margaret Wilson). The school closed on the same day as the academies opening, 1 September 2006. The school's relocation to the new Marshfoot Road site was delayed.

In February 2007 Executive Principal Margaret Wilson resigned and later that year the academy left the Ormiston Trust (whilst retaining its sponsorship), setting up a new trust named The Gateway Learning Community (GLC). The Gateway Academy was also its leader (hence the name) and the roles of head and executive principal in the school were abolished, with Kevin Sadler becoming the school's sole principal. Sadler was previously a music teacher and an arts centre director. He was also the headteacher of Passmores School in Harlow. The school finally relocated to the new "G shaped" site in 2008 and as a result the St Chad's site was disused and finally faced demolition. In 2009 a fire broke out during said demolition and smoke could reportedly be seen more than a mile away. The demolition was completed not long after.

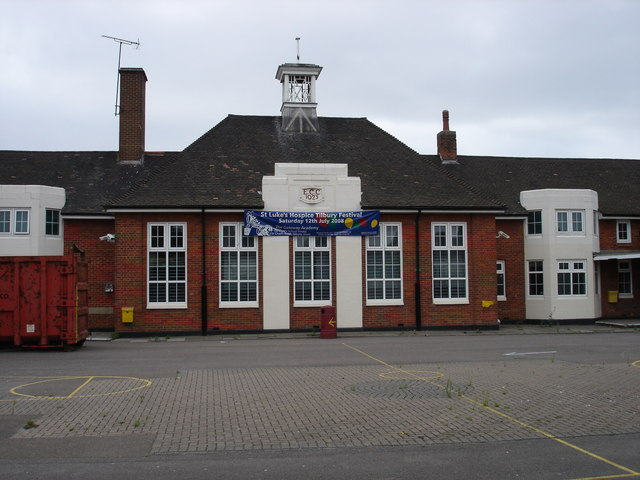
The St Chad's School site in 2008

=== 2011–present ===
By 2011 the school was a specialist college in arts, design, and engineering and also provided sixth form education. On 9 November 2011 the school jumped from satisfactory/requires improvement to outstanding in the Ofsted rankings. The school's sixth form was however ranked with a 3 in all categories and was therefore satisfactory/requires improvement, primarily "because of the above average drop-out rate". The sixth form would be discontinued in 2014.

In 2011 Kevin Sadler resigned as principal but remained the CEO of the GLC. The new principal would be Debbie Bull. She left in 2014 and in that year's summer term a new senior leadership team was established, with GLC CEO Sadler appointing himself as the school's new executive principal. The head of school role was re-established with two co-ruling acting heads, Nathan Hunnisett and Steve Durkin. In July 2015 the school's permanent and current head of school, Grainne McLaughlin, was appointed.

In 2015 48% of students in the school (475 students at the time) were regarded as disadvantaged and were granted access to the UK Government's Pupil Premium scheme. In 2017 Ofsted recategorized the school from outstanding to requires improvement stating that "Since the previous inspection, pupil progress, including that of disadvantaged pupils, has declined. The school is no longer outstanding." This was despite the school leadership receiving praise and being judged as good. In 2019 this judgement was refuted and Ofsted graded the school as good.

== House system ==
The Gateway operates without a house system. Pastoral duties are shared with year groups and faculties with progress leaders and lead coaches being designated to years and rewards to faculties as opposed to the colleges. Colleges determine slight changes to Gateway students' school uniform, namely the colours on their ties. The colleges are overseen by college coordinators.

== The Gateway Primary Free School ==
The Gateway Primary Free School is currently situated on The Gateway Academy's campus, albeit in a separate building, and is sponsored by the Ormiston Trust and is part of the GLC. It opened in 2012 and the first permanent head of school was Thom Martin who was replaced by Daniel George, who in turn became executive head and was replaced as head of school by Emma Pattison. The school's current building began construction in 2013 and is located on Gateway Academy's site. The building's opening was attended by GLC CEO Kevin Sadler and Thurrock MP Jackie Doyle-Price. The school serves 4-11 year olds and has an Ofsted rating of good.

== Headteachers and principals ==
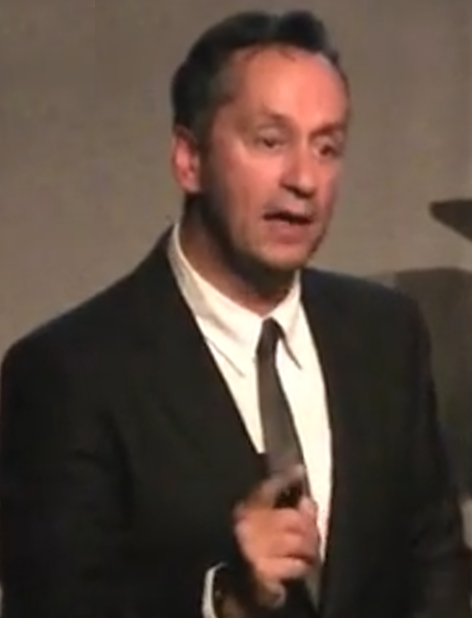
GLC CEO Kevin Sadler was Gateway Academy's principal from 2007 to 2011 and is now executive principal, having been in this position since 2014

=== St Chad's School ===
- Jack Stanley Stone (1940s–1965)
- William John White Preece (1965–???)
- John Sherbourne (2000)
- A. L. Swift (???–2003)

=== Torells School ===
- Betty Finch OBE (1978–1988)
- Lynn Adams (1998–2003)

=== The Gateway ===
- Mark Morrall (2003–2006)
- Garry Pratt (2006–2007)
- Margaret Wilson (executive 2006–2007)
- Kevin Sadler (2007–2011, executive 2014 – present)
- Debbie Bull (2011–2014)
- Nathan Hunnisett and Steve Durkin (co-ruling 2014–2015)
- Grainne McLaughlin (2015 – present)

== Notable alumni ==
=== Torells School ===
- Joe Pasquale, comedian and television personality.
- Fatima Whitbread, javelin thrower and Olympic medallist.

== Notable staff ==
=== St Chad's School ===
- Margaret Whitbread, javelin thrower.
