= Athletics at the 1986 Commonwealth Games – Women's javelin throw =

Women's javelin throw at the Commonwealth Games

The women's javelin throw event at the 1986 Commonwealth Games was held on 31 July at the Meadowbank Stadium in Edinburgh.

== Results ==
Rank	Name	Nationality	#1	#2	#3	#4	#5	#6	Result	Notes
1st place, gold medalist(s)	Tessa Sanderson	England	59.14	60.14	x	66.30	69.80	x	69.80	GR
2nd place, silver medalist(s)	Fatima Whitbread	England	65.60	65.50	68.54				68.54	
3rd place, bronze medalist(s)	Sue Howland	Australia	64.74	x	62.28				64.74	
4	Jeanette Kieboom	Australia							56.18	
5	Celine Chartrand	Canada							55.80	
6	Karen Hough	Wales							53.32	
7	Anna Lockton	England							52.90	
8	Faye Roblin	Canada							50.92	
9	Kirsty Evans	Canada							49.50	
10	Shona Urquhart	Scotland							48.04	
11	Petra Rivers	Australia							47.32	
12	Lyn Osmers	New Zealand							38.70	
