= England Athletics Hall of Fame =

The England Athletics Hall of Fame was launched in 2008 with a panel of experts selecting a list of potential inductees for athletics fans and members of the public to vote on. The Hall of Fame honours those who have made an outstanding contribution to the sport of athletics in England. Each year the public is able to vote on a shortlist of athletes who have been put forward for voting by a panel of experts.

The short list for the public to vote on is drawn up on various criteria, including the following:

- Athletes will be selected for the Hall of Fame shortlist based on their contribution to the sport of athletics as well as performance. (This could be as an athlete, coach or some other contributor). An example could be the impact of Roger Bannister's sub-four-minute mile on middle-distance running or Seb Coe’s work for the sport and Olympics.
- Nominated athletes must have been retired for a minimum of five years.

Chairman of the Hall of Fame panel is Darren Campbell. Darren himself won Olympic gold in the 4 × 100 m relay and a silver at 200m. He was also European 100m champion and bronze medallist in the World Championships.

== Inductees ==
=== 2008–2010 ===
2008

- Daley Thompson
- Sally Gunnell
- Lord Coe
- Steve Ovett
- David Hemery
- Sir Roger Bannister
- David Holding
- David Coleman
- Geoff Dyson
- Chris Brasher

2009

- Harold Abrahams
- Malcolm Arnold
- Steve Backley
- Steve Cram
- Jonathan Edwards
- Ron Pickering
- Ann Packer
- Mary Rand
- Alf Shrubb
- Noel Thatcher
- Dorothy Tyler
- Sydney Wooderson

2010

- Paula Radcliffe
- P.W. ‘Jimmy’ Green
- John Le Masurier
- Denis Watts
- Walter George
- Albert Hill
- Linford Christie
- Brendan Foster
- Dame Kelly Holmes

=== 2011–2013 ===
2011

- Kathy Cook
- Tom Hampson
- Dorothy Hyman
- Derek Ibbotson
- Denise Lewis
- Bruce Longden
- Ken Matthews
- Sam Mussabini
- Jean Pickering
- Harold Whitlock
- Mike Smith

2012

- F.A.M Webster
- Don Finlay
- David Moorcroft
- Chris Chataway
- Tessa Sanderson
- Fred Housden
- Wilf Paish
- Fatima Whitbread
- Marea Hartman
- Douglas Lowe

2013

- Sheila Lerwill
- Alan Pascoe
- Sir Ludwig Guttmann
- Diane Leather
- Jim Peters
- Jack Holden
- Mel Watman
- Don Thompson
- Gordon Pirie

=== 2014-2016 ===
2014

- Bob Matthews
- Sir Arthur Gold
- Ron Hill
- Muriel Cornell
- George Gandy
- Guy Butler
- Ashia Hansen
- George Bunner
- Darren Campbell

2015

- Joan Allison
- Peter Coe
- Lillian Board
- Basil Heatley
- Peter Elliott
- McDonald Bailey
- Emil Voigt
- Danny Crates
- Roger Black

2016

- Kriss Akabusi
- Bud Baldaro
- Judy Oakes
- Peter Radford
- Ron Roddan
- Joyce Smith
- Men’s 4x400m Relay Team at the 1991 World Championships in Athletics

=== 2017-2019 ===
2017

- Godfrey Brown
- Maurice Herriott
- Carl Johnson
- Derek Johnson
- Arthur Rowe
- Wendy Sly
- Stuart Storey
- Men’s 4x100m Relay Team at the 1912 Summer Olympics

2018

- Geoff Capes
- Jessica Ennis-Hill
- Tommy Green
- Peter Matthews
- Katharine Merry
- Aston Moore
- John Regis

2019

- Willie Applegarth
- Jenny Archer
- Robbie Brightwell
- Paul Dickenson
- Phillips Idowu
- Christine Ohuruogu
- Mark Rowland
- Kelly Sotherton

=== 2021–2022 ===
2021

- Cherry Alexander
- Lloyd Cowan
- Verona Elder
- Jason Gardener
- Tony Jarrett
- Paul Nihill
- Greg Rutherford
- Sheila Sherwood

2022

- Keith Connor
- Sophie Hitchon
- Percy Hodge
- John Isaacs
- Dean Macey
- Howard Payne
- Jon Ridgeon
- Steve Smith

== See also ==
- England Athletics
- List of European Athletics Championships medalists (men)
- List of European Athletics Championships medalists (women)
