= Bechard =

Bechard or Béchard is a French surname. Notable people with the surname include:

- Albert Béchard (1922–2002), Canadian politician and notary
- Christine Béchard (born 1963), Mauritian athlete
- Claude Béchard (1969–2010), Canadian politician from Quebec
- Deni Ellis Béchard, Canadian-American novelist
- François Béchard (1830–1897), Canadian politician
- Kelly Bechard (born 1978), Canadian ice hockey player
