= Athletics at the 1978 Commonwealth Games – Women's javelin throw =

Women's javelin throw at the Commonwealth Games

The women's javelin throw event at the 1978 Commonwealth Games was held on 10 August at the Commonwealth Stadium in Edmonton, Alberta, Canada.

== Results ==
Rank	Name	Nationality	Result	Notes
1st place, gold medalist(s)	Tessa Sanderson	England	61.34	GR
2nd place, silver medalist(s)	Alison Hayward	Canada	54.52	
3rd place, bronze medalist(s)	Laurie Kern	Canada	53.60	
4	Eunice Nekesa	Kenya	51.46	
5	Margaret Phillpot	Australia	50.08	
6	Fatima Whitbread	England	49.16	
7	Shara Spragg	England	49.02	
8	Diane Williams	Scotland	46.02	
9	Bev Francis	Australia	45.52	
10	Jacqueline Zaslona	Wales	41.08	
11	Sonia Smith	Bermuda	39.34	
12	Elizabeth Twyford	Saint Lucia	29.62	
	Jeanette Kieboom	Australia	NM	
