= Athletics at the 1982 Commonwealth Games – Women's javelin throw =

Women's javelin throw at the Commonwealth Games

The women's javelin throw event at the 1982 Commonwealth Games was held on 7 October at the QE II Stadium in Brisbane, Australia.

== Results ==
| Rank | Name | Nationality | #1 | #2 | #3 | #4 | #5 | #6 | Result | Notes |
|---|---|---|---|---|---|---|---|---|---|---|
| 1st place, gold medalist(s) | Sue Howland | Australia | 64.46 | 61.78 | | 63.24 | | | 64.46 | GR |
| 2nd place, silver medalist(s) | Petra Rivers | Australia | 60.48 | | 62.28 | | | | 62.28 | |
| 3rd place, bronze medalist(s) | Fatima Whitbread | England | 57.22 | | | 58.86 | | | 58.86 | |
| 4 | Pamela Matthews | Australia | | | | | | | 55.16 | |
| 5 | Monique Lapres | Canada | | | | | | | 52.30 | |
| 6 | Celine Chartrand | Canada | | | | | | | 50.14 | |
| 7 | Sharon Gibson | England | | | | | | | 49.56 | |
| 8 | Mereoni Vibose | Fiji | | | | | | | 47.30 | |
| 9 | Elizabeth Olaba | Kenya | | | | | | | 40.96 | |
| 10 | Christine Béchard | Mauritius | | | | | | | 31.68 | |
| | Margaret Sakala | Zimbabwe | | | | | | | NM | |
