= Masters W40 javelin world record progression =

Masters W40 javelin world record progression is the progression of world record improvements of the javelin throw W40 division of Masters athletics. Records must be conducted appropriately, with official competitions under the standing IAAF rules unless modified by World Masters Athletics. The W40 division consists of female athletes. These athletes have reached the age of 40 but have not yet reached the age of 45. The W40 division athletes throw the same 600g javelin as the Open division. The competitors all threw their records in open competition.

Key

Incomplete information Pending

Distance	Athlete	Nationality	Birthdate	Age	Location	Date
63.08 m	Barbora Spotakova	Czech Republic	30 June 1981	40 years, 9 days	Monaco	9 July 2021
61.96 m	Lavern Eve	Bahamas	16 June 1965	40 years, 85 days	Monaco	9 September 2005
61.23 m	Felicia Moldovan	Romania	29 September 1967	40 years, 251 days	Bucharest	6 June 2008
53.02 m	Elisabeth Wahlander	Sweden	14 March 1960	40 years, 158 days	Uppsala	19 August 2000
46.25 m	Sandra Dejus	Latvia	13 April 1958	42 years, 90 days	Jyvaskyla	12 July 2000
45.16 m	Ingrid Anna Thyssen	Germany	9 January 1956	43 years, 112 days	Cologne	1 May 1999

== Old javelin ==
Distance	Athlete	Nationality	Birthdate	Age	Location	Date
64.06 m	Tessa Sanderson	United Kingdom	14 March 1956	40 years, 120 days	London	12 July 1996
