= Athletics at the 1990 Commonwealth Games – Women's javelin throw =

Women's javelin throw at the Commonwealth Games

The women's javelin throw event at the 1990 Commonwealth Games was held on 1 February at the Mount Smart Stadium in Auckland.

== Results ==
Rank	Name	Nationality	#1	#2	#3	#4	#5	#6	Result	Notes
1st place, gold medalist(s)	Tessa Sanderson	England		65.72					65.72	
2nd place, silver medalist(s)	Sue Howland	Australia	57.90	58.40	58.50				61.18	
3rd place, bronze medalist(s)	Kate Farrow	Australia	57.30	58.98	51.72				58.98	
4	Sharon Gibson	England	55.24	56.64	55.42	57.26	?	?	57.26	
5	Nicola Emblem	Scotland	48.12	48.46	56.96	52.84	?	?	56.96	
6	Caroline White	Wales							55.18	
7	Kaye Nordstrom	New Zealand							53.52	
8	Kirsten Hellier	New Zealand							52.34	
9	Cheryl Coker	Canada							50.10	
10	Matilda Kasava	Tanzania							49.20	
11	Iammo Launa	Papua New Guinea							49.08	
12	Schola Mujawamaria	Uganda							46.48	
13	Valerie Tulloch	Canada	x	x	45.76				45.76	
12	Lorri LaRowe	Canada							45.16	
