= Grays, Essex =

Town in Essex, England

Coordinates: 51.475°N 0.330°E

Grays
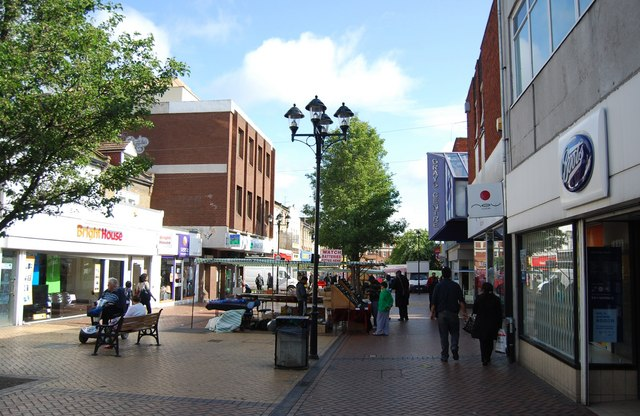
- Grays High Street

- Location within Essex
- Population: 44,345 (Built up area, 2021)
- OS grid reference: TQ615773
- Unitary authority: Thurrock
- Ceremonial county: Essex
- Region: East
- Country: England
- Sovereign state: United Kingdom
- Post town: Grays
- Postcode district: RM16-RM17, RM20
- Dialling code: 01375
- Police: Essex
- Fire: Essex
- Ambulance: East of England
- UK Parliament: Thurrock

Grays (or Grays Thurrock) is the largest town in the borough of Thurrock, in southern Essex, England. The town is located on the north bank of the River Thames, approximately 20 miles (32 km) east of Central London, and 2 miles (3.2 km) east of the M25 motorway. Its economy is linked to Port of London industries, its own offices, retail and the Lakeside Shopping Centre at West Thurrock. At the 2021 census the Grays built up area as defined by the Office for National Statistics (which does not include the adjoining Chafford Hundred) had a population of 44,345.

Grays Thurrock was an ancient parish. It was abolished as a civil parish in 1936 on the creation of Thurrock Urban District, which in turn became the modern borough of Thurrock in 1974. Grays Thurrock remains the name of one of Thurrock's Church of England parishes.

== History ==
Archaeological evidence indicates that the area now occupied by Grays has been inhabited by humans since the Palaeolithic period.

The Domesday Book of 1086 records seven estates or manors at a vill called Thurrock. Two of the Thurrock manors were in the hundred of Barstable and the other five were in the hundred of Chafford. The Domesday Book does not otherwise distinguish between the Thurrock manors by name. No church or priest is explicitly mentioned under any of the Thurrock entries. The area subsequently became three parishes: Little Thurrock, covering the two manors in Barstable hundred; Grays Thurrock, broadly covering the manor in Chafford hundred that had been owned by William Peverel at the time of the Domesday Book; and West Thurrock, covering the remainder of the Thurrock manors in Chafford hundred.

The name Thurrock means the place where dirty water or bilge collects. The name was typically applied to the bottom of a ship, but in this case is thought to refer to marshy areas on the banks of the Thames. By 1190, the manor which had been owned by William Peverel in 1086 had come to be under the tenancy of a Jewish man called Isaac, son of Josce the Rabbi. In 1194, Isaac's son, another Josce, lost possession of the manor when it was seized by the crown. The following year, 1195, the crown granted the manor to Henry de Grey, who also purchased Josce's remaining interest in the manor. The manor thereafter remained in the possession of the de Grey family until the 16th century, and so the manor and its associated parish both became known as Grays Thurrock. Over time, Grays Thurrock generally became known just as Grays. Today, the Royal Mail just uses Grays as the name for the post town, and the Office for National Statistics likewise calls the built up area just Grays.

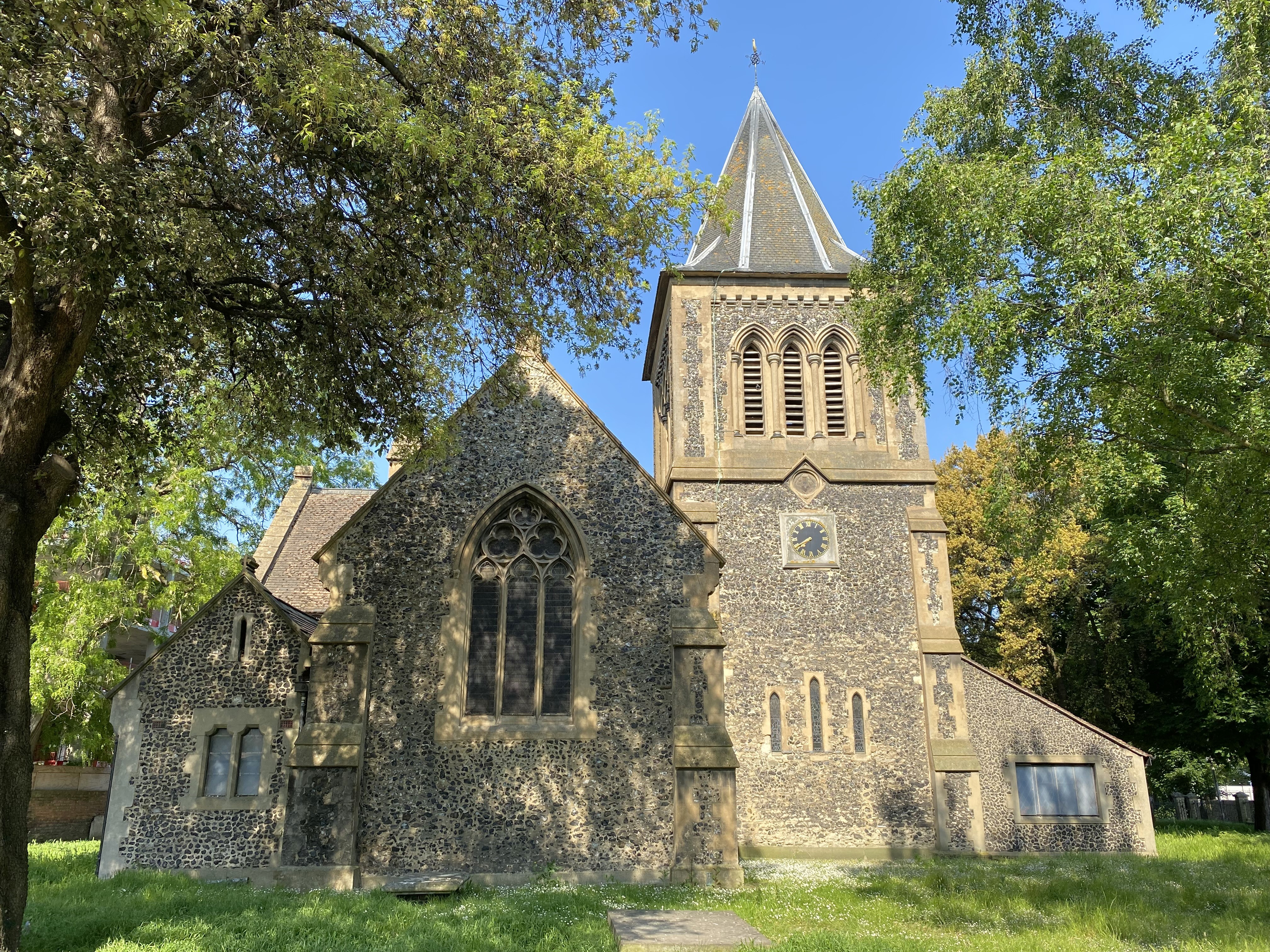
St Peter's and St Paul's Church

A church is known to have existed at Grays by the late 12th century. The church is dedicated to St Peter and St Paul. Fragments of late 12th century and 13th century fabric survive, notably in the tower, but most of the building was rebuilt in 1846. The Church of England ecclesiastical parish it serves is still officially called Grays Thurrock.

Samuel Pepys recorded in his diary that he visited Grays on 24 September 1665 and apparently bought fish from the local fishermen.

The London, Tilbury and Southend Railway opened its line from London as far as Tilbury in April 1854, and Grays railway station opened a few months later on 13 August 1854.

Parts of Grays and Chafford Hundred are set within three Victorian chalk pits; the largest two are the Lion Gorge and the Warren Gorge. Another area of the Chafford Hundred residential development is built on a Victorian landfill site.

In 1903 a Free Library was opened on Orsett Road, financed in part by Andrew Carnegie. It was demolished after the 2nd World War to make way for the Thameside Complex.

Thurrock Town Hall on New Road in Grays was built in the 1980s; work on an extension began in January 2020.

On 23 October 2019, the bodies of 39 people were found in the back of a lorry at Waterglade Industrial Park in Eastern Avenue. They are believed to have been victims of human trafficking, or migrants being smuggled into Britain. The vehicle, registered in Bulgaria, was thought to have travelled to the UK through Purfleet from Zeebrugge. A 25-year-old lorry driver from Northern Ireland was arrested by Essex Police on suspicion of murder and pleaded guilty to manslaughter in April 2020. Essex Police launched an investigation afterwards and the lorry was moved to the nearby Port of Tilbury. It is the biggest murder investigation in the history of Essex police. On 26 May 2020, a total of 26 further suspects, most of them Vietnamese nationals, were arrested in Belgium and France.

== Geography ==
Grays contains the wards and residential areas of Grays Riverside, Grays Thurrock, Stifford Clays, Little Thurrock Blackshots, Little Thurrock Rectory and Chadwell St Mary. Parts of Chafford Hundred and North and South Stifford are also in Grays.

The town is approximately 20 miles (32 kilometres) east of London on the north bank of the River Thames and two miles (three kilometres) east of the M25 motorway. Its economy is linked to Port of London industries, its own offices, retail and Lakeside, West Thurrock. Its variously used riverside (from homes through wild bird-habitat marshland to importation, storage and distribution) faces Broadness Lighthouse in Kent.

== Landmarks ==
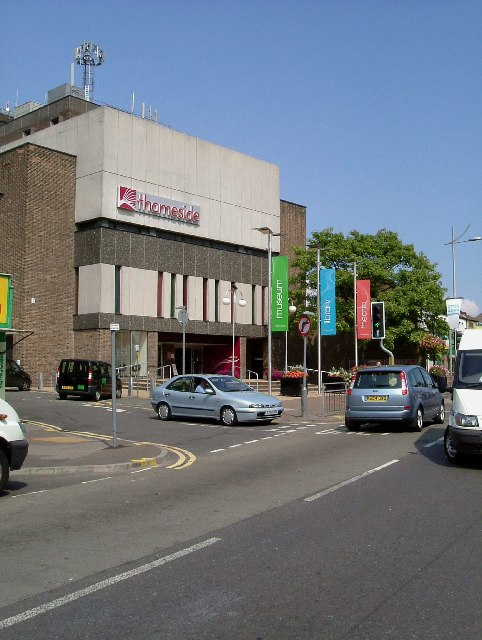
Thameside Theatre

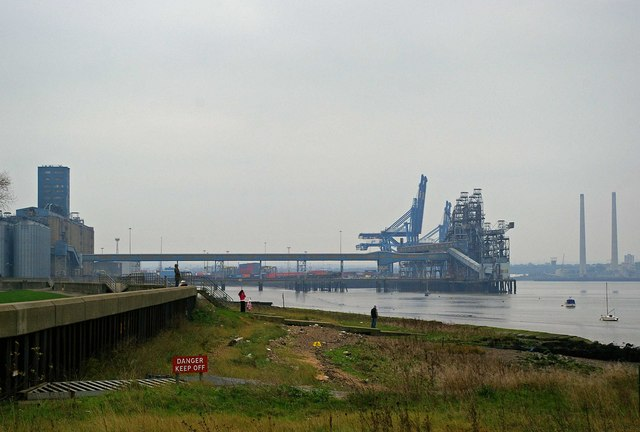
Grays Beach with the Tilbury Docks in the background

The Dell

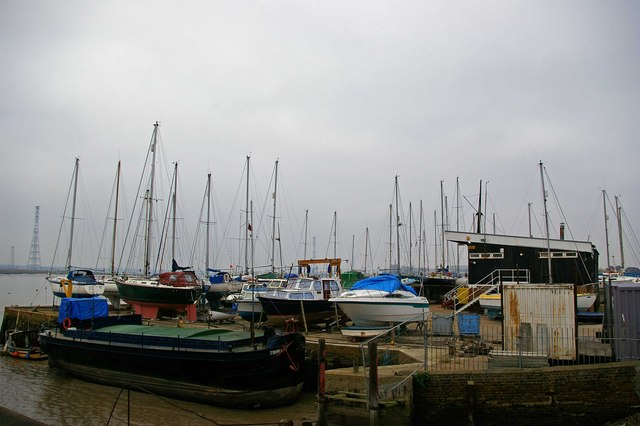
Thurrock Yacht Club

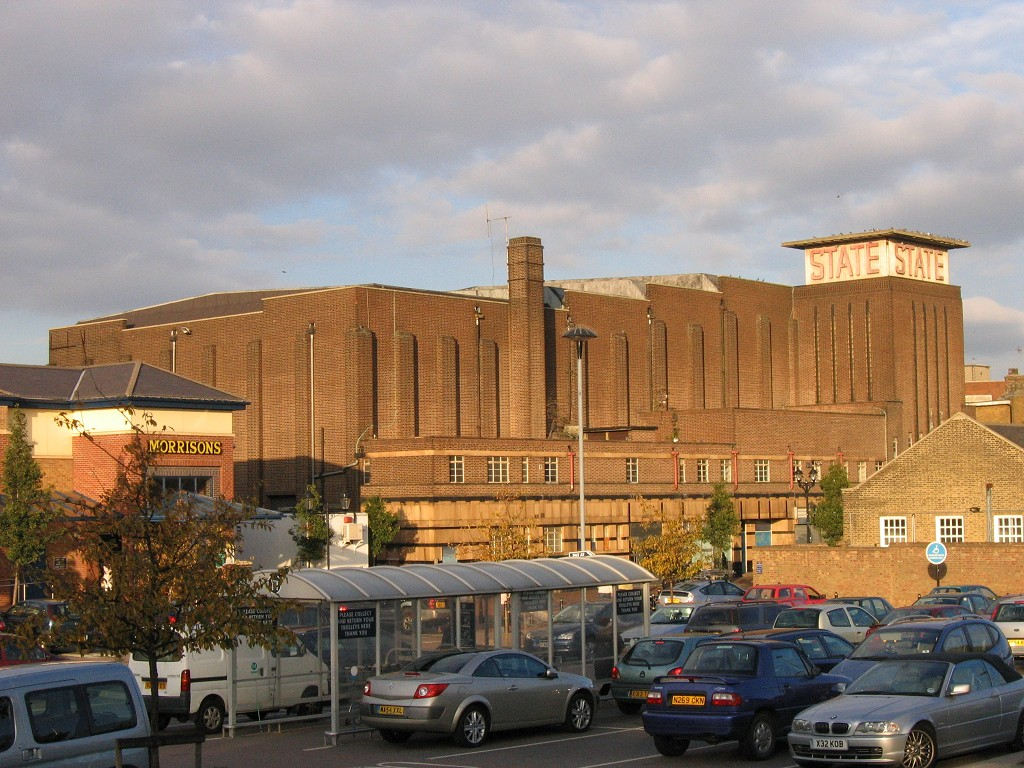
The State Cinema

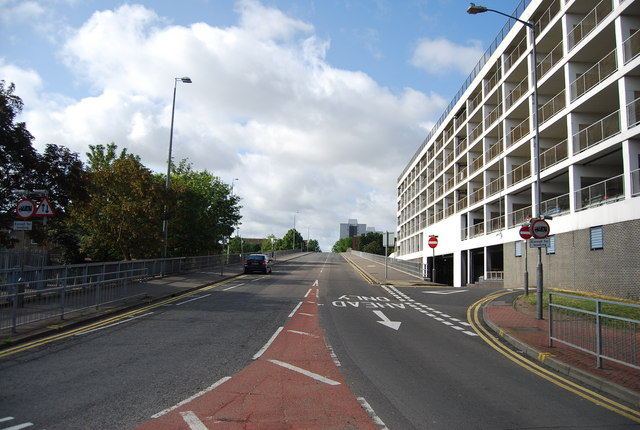
Beginning of the Derby Road Bridge

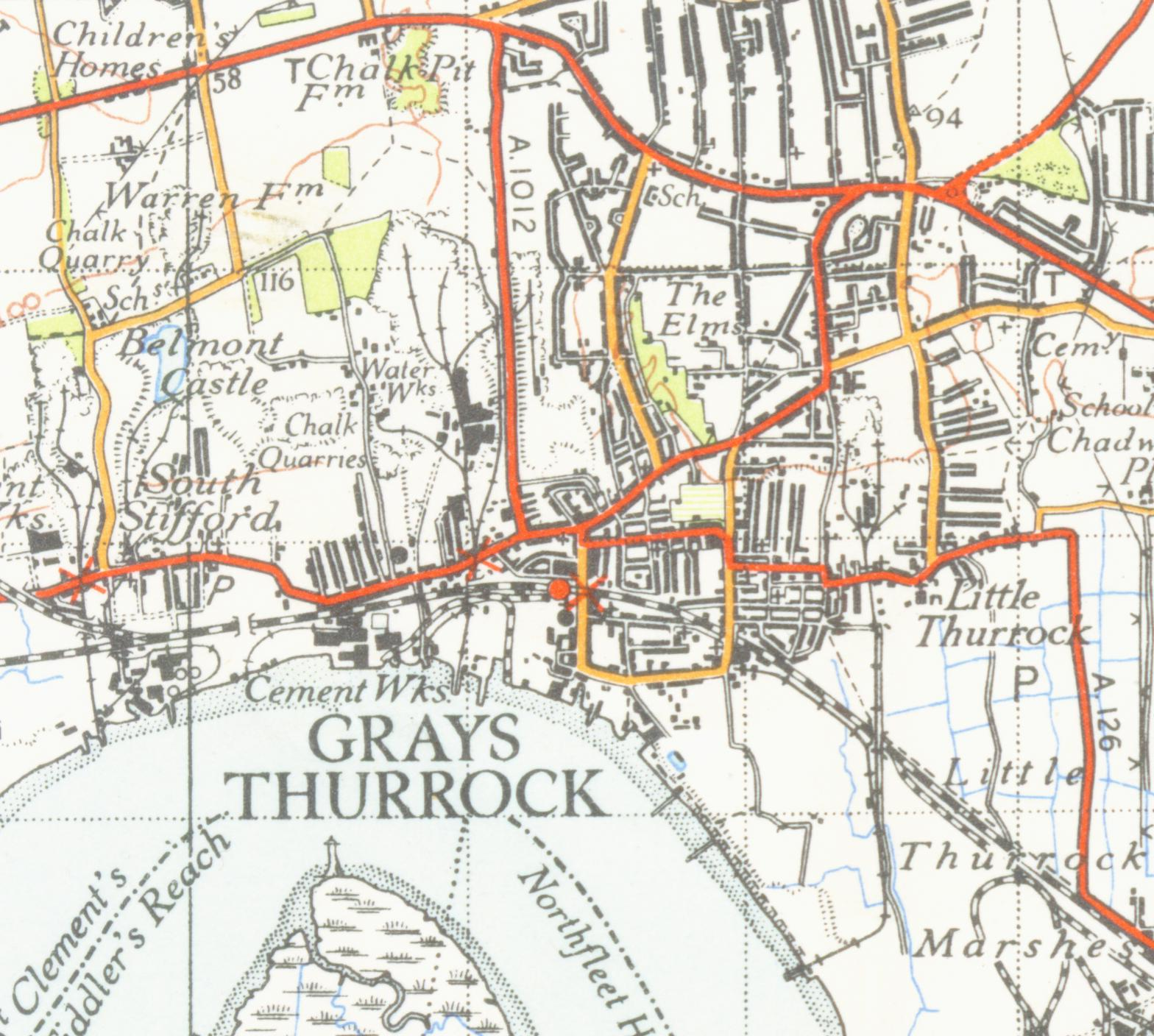
A map of the town from 1946

Local sites of interest include the Thameside Theatre, the Thurrock History Museum, Grays Beach, The White Hart, and the former State Cinema.

The Dell was one of the earliest houses in Britain to be built of concrete. It was built on the instructions of Alfred Russel Wallace, who lived in the town from 1872 until 1876.

From the top of the Derby Road Bridge in Grays one can look down to Thurrock Yacht Club, Grays Beach children's playground and the River Thames.

As well as Thurrock Yacht Club, Grays Beach is the site of the local landmark The Gull, a lightship built in 1860, which has lain on the foreshore for decades and is now in a serious state of dilapidation. The light from The Gull has now been removed, restored and installed on the foreshore of the yacht club.

The Thameside Theatre was built in 1971 and is the only theatre in Thurrock. In July 2021 Thurrock Council declared it to be surplus to budget requirements and announced plans for its closure. The Labour opposition in the council opposed the plans and an online petition calling for its preservation was signed by over 1,000 residents. Grays native Russell Brand gave his support to saving the theatre on an Instagram post and pledged to perform a show there to help prevent its closure. In January 2022 Thurrock Council announced that they supported a counter proposal that will see the theatre remain open under community ownership. A group dedicated to saving the theatre began negotiating with the council, and had to provide it with an affordable business plan for the theatre by 13 July 2022. However, after an unnamed organisation expressed interest in buying the theatre, the council has delayed the deadline to September to allow it to put forward an alternative business plan.

== Governance ==
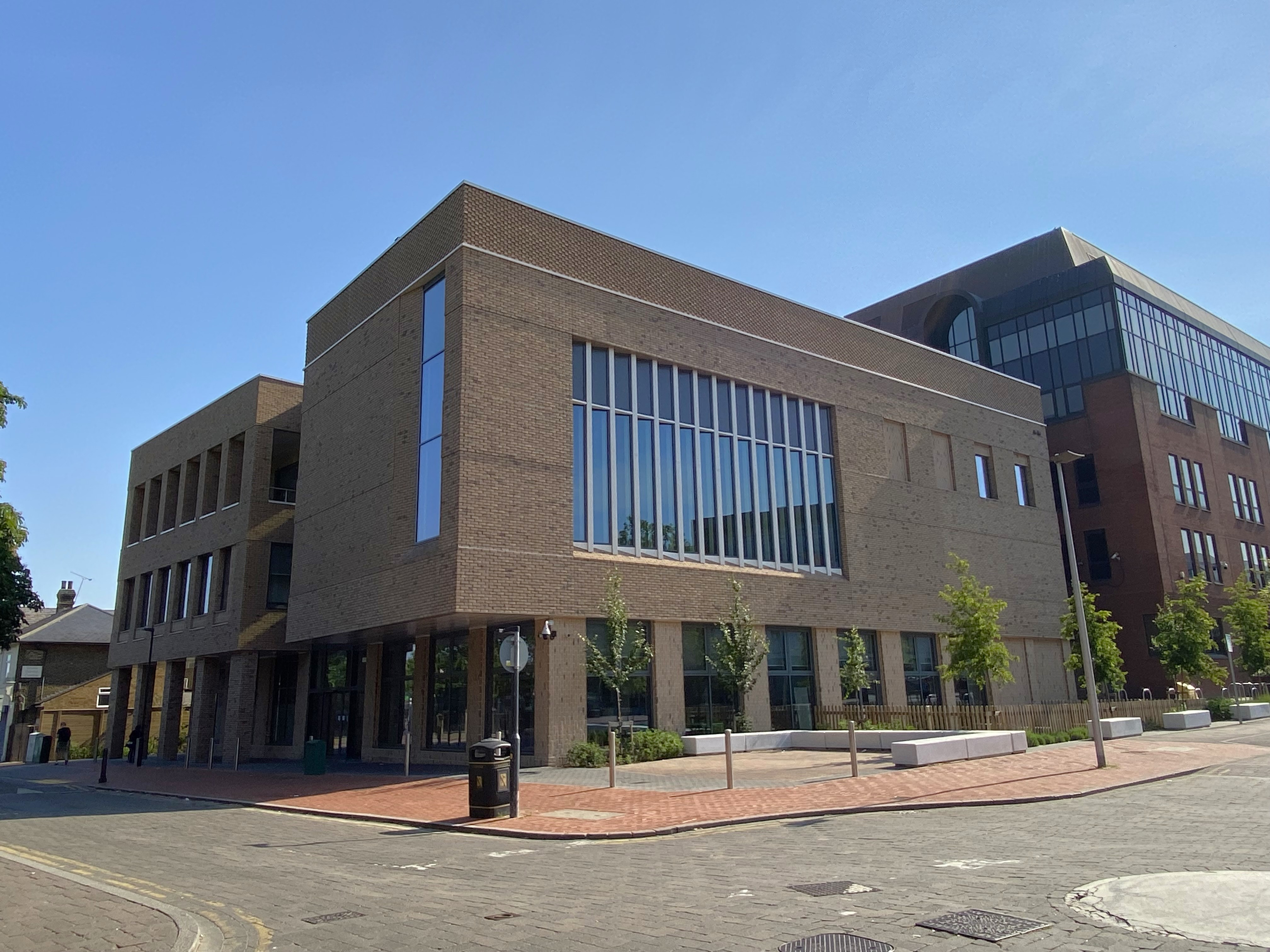
Thurrock Town Hall, New Road, Grays

There is one tier of local government covering Grays, at unitary authority level: Thurrock Council. The council is based at Thurrock Town Hall and the adjoining Civic Offices on New Road in Grays.

=== Administrative history ===
Grays Thurrock was an ancient parish in the Chafford Hundred of Essex. In 1886, the parish was made a local government district, administered by an elected local board. Such districts were reconstituted as urban districts under the Local Government Act 1894.

The urban district and civil parish of Grays Thurrock was abolished in 1936, when the area was merged with Purfleet Urban District, Tilbury Urban District, and Orsett Rural District to become Thurrock Urban District. At the 1931 census (the last before the abolition of the urban district and civil parish), Grays Thurrock had a population of 18,173.

Thurrock Urban District was reformed to become a non-metropolitan district with borough status called Thurrock in 1974. Thurrock Borough Council became a unitary authority in 1998, taking over county-level services in the borough which until then had been provided by Essex County Council. Thurrock remains part of the ceremonial county of Essex for the purposes of lieutenancy.

== Education ==
=== Primary education ===
Primary schools in Grays include:

- Quarry Hill Academy (formerly Quarry Hill Primary and Pre School)
- West Thurrock Academy (formerly West Thurrock Primary School)
- Belmont Castle Academy (formerly Stifford Primary School)
- Woodside Academy (formerly Woodside Primary School)
- Warren Primary School
- Thameside Primary School
- Deneholm Primary School
- St Thomas of Canterbury Catholic Primary School
- The Light Christian School
- Gateway Primary Free School (Note: Gateway Primary Free School and Gateway Academy are located between the two communities that they serve, Chadwell St Mary and Tilbury. The schools' official addresses, however, are in Grays.)

Quarry Hill Primary and Pre School and Thameside Primary School were formed from the amalgamations of failing infant and junior schools. Since then, both schools have received favourable grades from education watchdog Ofsted. Belmont Castle Academy was renamed in honour of Belmont Castle, a demolished gothic mansion that was located on the school site. The Gateway Primary Free School is situated on the site of Gateway Academy, and is the only primary school with free school status in Grays.

A Christian private school, The Light Christian School, opened in Grays in 2025.

=== Secondary education ===
Secondary schools in Grays include:

- Hathaway Academy (formerly the Grays School Media Arts College)
- Gateway Academy (formerly the Gateway Community College)
- Grays Convent High School (formerly the Convent Day School)
- William Edwards School (formerly William Edwards School and Sports College)
- Thames Park Secondary School
- Orsett Heath Academy

Since 2007, all of these schools have had specialist school status. Gateway Academy and Hathaway Academy have specialisms in the arts. In the case of Hathaway Academy, these include digital media and the performing arts. Gateway Academy also specialises in design and engineering. William Edwards School and Orsett Heath Academy share a sports specialism, with both schools utilising the ability to admit 10% of their intake by academic aptitude in this subject, an ability granted to all sport specialist schools. Grays Convent High School maintains a language specialism and Thames Park Secondary School has specialisms in artificial intelligence and digital technology.

Gateway Academy was formed in 2003 from a fresh start merger of Torells School in Grays and St Chad's School in Tilbury. The Torells School site has since been demolished and replaced by the sites of two special schools, Treetops School and Treetops Free School. Comedian Joe Pasquale and Olympic medallist Fatima Whitbread both attended Torells School. Footballers Chris Cohen and Max Porter went to William Edwards School. Actor, YouTuber and comedian Russell Brand attended the Grays School, making his acting debut at one of the school's Bugsy Malone productions. Grays Convent High School was attended by journalist and former Thurrock MP candidate Polly Billington and runner Jessica Judd.

All of these schools are coeducational academies or free schools, with the exception of Grays Convent High School, which is instead a voluntary aided Catholic school for girls.

=== Further education ===
A sixth form was operated by Gateway Academy before 2014, but it closed that year. In 2011, Ofsted deemed the sixth form as satisfactory, which meant it required improvement. This was primarily because of concerns over the number of students dropping out, which was above average. Hathaway Academy intended to open a sixth form some time before the 2014/2015 academic year, but this never came to fruition.

Thurrock Technical College opened in 1952 on Dell Road. Between 1954 and 1957 the college was based in parts of the site of Grays County Technical High School (which would become Grays School) and Grays Hall. In 1960 it reopened on Woodview Road, later establishing a second campus in Aveley. The college later merged with Basildon College to form Thurrock and Basildon College, with the Woodview Campus remaining in operation. The college then amalgamated with South East Essex College of Arts and Technology in 2010, forming South Essex College. The Thurrock Campus relocated from Woodview Road to a new complex in Grays town centre in September 2014.

The local sixth form college is USP College Palmer's Campus. Palmer's dates back to 1706, when the merchant William Palmer founded a charity school for "ten poore children" of the parish of Grays Essex. The school was located in the local churchyard and evolved into a boys' school. In response to the enactment of the Elementary Education Act 1870, the school reopened on a new site on the hill above the town in 1874. A girls' school opened on the site in 1876. Both schools were grammar schools, operating on the same site until 1931, when the girls' school relocated to Chadwell Road. From this time, Palmer's became a public school. This meant that students were no longer admitted on academic performance regardless of background and were instead admitted by fee. This was reversed in 1944, however wealthier students were still prioritised, even if they failed the 11+ exam required for enrolment. In 1971 the girls' school began its conversion into a sixth form college, reopening as Palmer's College in 1972 after it amalgamated with the boys' school and Aveley County Technical High School. The college merged with Seevic College in August 2017, forming USP College.

There is also Thurrock Adult Community College which is located in multiple venues and community hubs across Thurrock and used to be based from Richmond Road in Grays.

== Transport ==
Grays has good road links, being close to the A13 road and the M25 motorway. The A126 London Road is the main road which links Grays town centre with Lakeside Shopping Centre, Purfleet and Tilbury.

Grays railway station runs through the centre of the built-up core and is served by c2c services to London Fenchurch Street to the west and Shoeburyness to the east. The typical journey time into London is 35 minutes.

Grays bus station, outside the railway station, is a hub for most bus services in Thurrock. The bus services are operated by Ensignbus, First Essex and NIBS Buses.

== Media ==
The town is served by BBC London and ITV London with television signals received from Crystal Palace TV transmitter, BBC South East and ITV Meridian can also be received from Bluebell Hill TV transmitter.

Local radio stations are BBC Essex, Heart East, Radio Essex, Gateway 97.8, and Thames Delta Radio, a community based radio station.

The Thurrock Gazette is the town's local weekly newspaper.

== Sports ==
The area's local football team is Grays Athletic, previously based in Grays but now in nearby Tilbury, which plays non-League football and has won the FA Trophy twice.

== Notable people ==
=== Actors, authors, and comedians ===
- Ian Abercrombie, actor and comedian.
- Russell Brand, comedian, TV presenter and actor.
- Phil Davis, actor, author, director and narrator.
- Michelle Harrison, author.
- Joe Pasquale, comedian, actor and television presenter.

=== Athletes ===
- Stuart Barnes, retired rugby union footballer and commentator.
- Chris Cohen, retired footballer and coach.
- Jessica Judd, runner.
- William Kennedy, retired footballer and soldier.
- Adam Newton, retired footballer.
- Max Porter, retired footballer and coach.
- Elton Prince, professional wrestler.
- Fatima Whitbread, retired Olympic medallist javelin thrower.
- Charlie Whitchurch, retired footballer.

=== Politicians and nobility ===
- Polly Billington, Labour politician and journalist.
- Sir Henry de Grey, courtier of John, King of England.
- Sir John de Grey, soldier and high sheriff.
- Frederick Marshall, Australian Labor politician.

=== Singers ===
- Sara Flower, contralto singer.
- Louisa Johnson, singer and X Factor series 12 winner.

=== Other ===
- Lewis Daynes, murderer of Breck Bednar.
- Elisabeth Vellacott, painter.
- Philip Vellacott, scholar.
- Alfred Russel Wallace, discovered evolution through natural selection.
