= Charlie Whitchurch =

English footballer

Personal information
- Full name: Charles Henry Whitchurch
- Date of birth: 29 October 1920
- Place of birth: Grays, England
- Date of death: July 1988 (aged 67)
- Place of death: Michigan, United States
- Position: Winger

Senior career*
Years	Team	Apps	(Gls)
- Portsmouth
1945–1946	West Ham United	0	(0)
1946–1947	Tottenham Hotspur	8	(2)
1947–1948	Southend United	18	(5)
1948–?	Folkestone Town		
- * Club domestic league appearances and goals

Charles Henry Whitchurch (29 October 1920 – July 1988) was an English professional footballer who played for Portsmouth, Tottenham Hotspur, Southend United, Folkestone Town and represented England at schoolboy level.

== Playing career ==
Whitchurch began his career with Portsmouth as an amateur. He joined West Ham United in May 1945 and played in 34 wartime matches and scored 11 goals for the Hammers. The winger signed for Tottenham Hotspur in January 1946 and went on to feature in eight senior matches and netted two goals. Whitchurch left White Hart Lane in July 1947 to play for Southend United to notch up a further five goals in 18 appearances. He later had a spell with Folkestone Town in 1948 where he ended his competitive career.

== Later life ==
In July 1988, Whitchurch died in Michigan, United States.
