= St Bede's School =

Secondary school in Surrey, England

Location
- Carlton Road; Redhill; RH1 2LQ; England; 51.2501°N 0.1753°W

Information
- Type: Voluntary aided school
- Religious affiliations: Church of England and Roman Catholic
- Established: 1976
- Local authority: Surrey
- Department for Education URN: 125278 Tables
- Ofsted: Reports
- Head teacher: Adam Powell
- Gender: Coeducational
- Age: 11 to 18
- Enrolment: As of 2025: 1952
- Capacity: 1890
- Website: www.st-bedes.surrey.sch.uk

Saint Bede's School is a coeducational secondary school and sixth form in Redhill, Surrey, England. In the most recent Ofsted inspection, the school was graded as "outstanding" in all areas. It now has over 1700 male and female pupils aged 11–18 (Years 7–13), with around 330 students in the sixth form. Classes have an average of 28 pupils.

== History ==
In 1976, Bishop Simpson Church of England Girls School amalgamated with St Joseph’s Catholic (mixed) School to create St Bede’s School. The school was the first voluntary-aided joint Church of England and Roman Catholic school to be established in Britain. Initially the school was split between three different sites in the town, but in December 1986, a grant of £1.9M was awarded to enable all teaching to be carried out at a single location. Two new buildings were constructed at the Carlton Road site, officially opened in March 1990 by Ronald Bowlby, the Anglican Bishop of Southwark, and Cormac Murphy-O'Connor, the Roman Catholic Bishop of Arundel and Brighton.

Between 1988 and 1999 the school underwent large-scale building works to bring the school together on its present site, and to create new facilities for a library, ICT and careers. In 2004 a new arts centre was opened and in 2006 a sports hall was opened. Starting in 2018, construction began to expand the school's capacity. This was finished in 2019.

== Notable former pupils ==
In 2014, a student at the school named Breck Bednar was murdered after becoming the victim of online grooming.

The Chelsea F.C. Women and England footballer Lexi Potter also attended St Bede's.
