= William Kennedy (footballer, born 1890) =

English footballer

- Kennedy at Northfleet United

Personal information
- Date of birth: 21 November 1890
- Place of birth: Grays, England
- Date of death: 13 October 1915 (aged 24)
- Place of death: Loos-en-Gohelle, France
- Position: Centre forward

Senior career*
Years	Team	Apps	(Gls)
–1909	Grays Athletic		
1909–1910	Northfleet United		
- Southend United (guest)
1910–1912	West Ham United	21	(10)
- * Club domestic league appearances and goals

William Kennedy (21 November 1890 – 13 October 1915) was a footballer who played as a centre forward for West Ham United.

Born in Grays to Scottish parents, the fourth of eight children, Kennedy attended Borough Road College between 1913 and 1915. He then worked as a schoolteacher and played amateur football with Grays Athletic before moving to Northfleet United along with Charlie Buchan in 1909. There, he was part of the team that won the Kent League, the Thames & Medway Combination, and the Kent Senior Cup in 1909–10. He scored over 50 goals in all competitions that season, including the opening goal of the Kent Senior Cup Final, against Chatham, leading the South Eastern Gazette to describe him as "probably the Cementers' best catch of the season". He also guested for Southend United.

In 1910, he joined West Ham United of the Southern League Division One. He scored on his debut, against Brighton & Hove Albion on 5 November 1910, and averaged a goal every other game during his two seasons at Upton Park. In January 1912, he switched to inside left, where he played his final three games for the club instead of his usual centre forward role. He was forced to retire from professional football after injuring his knee in an FA Cup third-round match against Middlesbrough on 8 February 1912.

After the outbreak of World War I, Kennedy enlisted with the London Scottish Regiment because of his parentage, and served as a Lance Corporal. He saw action at Loos as part of an offensive on the Hohenzollern Redoubt and was killed in action in France on 13 October 1915. He and two others were killed by shellfire during a patrol. His brother, John, was also killed during the conflict. Both are commemorated at the Loos Memorial.
