= Tessa Sanderson =

British former javelin thrower (born 1956)

Tessa Sanderson CBE
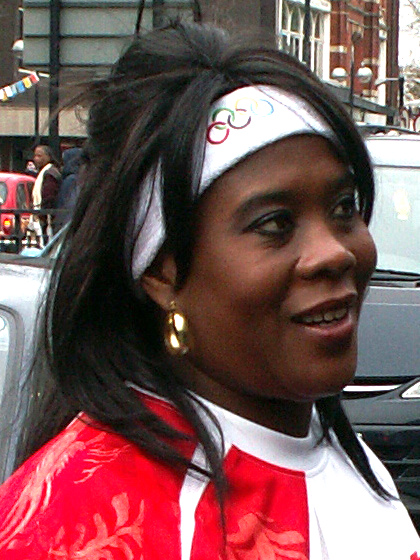
- Sanderson in 2008

Personal information
- Full name: Theresa Ione Sanderson
- Nationality: British (English)
- Born: 14 March 1956 (age 70) St Elizabeth, Colony of Jamaica
- Years active: 1973–1997
- Height: 168 cm (5 ft 6 in)
- Weight: 70 kg (154 lb)

Sport
- Sport: Athletics
- Event: Javelin throw
- Club: WBAC

Achievements and titles
- Personal best: 73.58 m (241.4 ft) (1983)
Medal record
Women's Athletics
Representing Great Britain
Olympic Games
Gold medal – first place	1984 Los Angeles	Javelin
European Championships
Silver medal – second place	1978 Prague	Javelin
Representing England
Commonwealth Games
Gold medal – first place	1978 Edmonton	Javelin
Gold medal – first place	1986 Edinburgh	Javelin
Gold medal – first place	1990 Auckland	Javelin

Theresa Ione Sanderson CBE (born 14 March 1956) is a British former javelin thrower. She appeared in every Summer Olympics from 1976 to 1996, winning the gold medal in the javelin throw at the 1984 Olympics. She was the second track and field athlete to compete at six Olympics, and the first Black British woman to win an Olympic gold medal.

Sanderson won gold medals in the javelin throw at three Commonwealth Games (1978, 1986 and 1990) and at the 1992 IAAF World Cup. She was runner-up at the 1978 European Athletics Championships, and competed in three world championships (1983, 1987, and 1997). Sanderson was UK National Champion three times and AAA National Champion in amateur athletics ten times. She set five Commonwealth records and ten British national records in the javelin, as well as records at the junior and masters levels. During her career, Sanderson had a rivalry with fellow Briton Fatima Whitbread, who took the bronze in the 1984 Olympics.

Outside athletics, Sanderson has made several guest television appearances, and was a sports reporter for Sky News when it began broadcasting in 1989. Sanderson was appointed a Member of the Order of the British Empire (MBE) in 1985 and became a Commander of the Order of the British Empire (CBE) in the 2004 New Years Honours. She was vice-chair of Sport England from 1999 to 2005, and later established the Tessa Sanderson Foundation and Academy, which aims to encourage young people and people with disabilities to take up sport.

== Early life ==
Theresa Ione Sanderson was born on 14 March 1956 in St Elizabeth, Colony of Jamaica. Her parents left Jamaica to find work in England when Sanderson was five. She was cared for by her grandmother until she went to live with her parents in Wednesfield (then in Staffordshire) at age six. Barbara Richards, her physical education teacher at Ward's Bridge High School, noted her talent for athletics and encouraged her to succeed; Richards threatened to place Sanderson in after-school detention if she did not train, an approach which Sanderson later said helped. She first threw a javelin at age 14, betting with a friend for a bag of chips on who would be able to throw it further.

== Athletic career ==
=== Early career ===
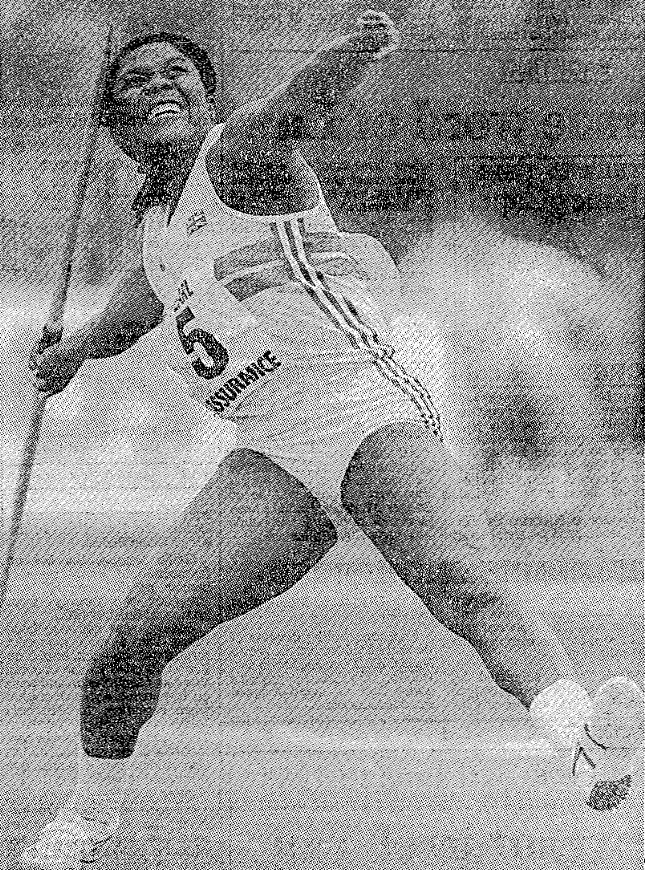
Sanderson in 1988

Sanderson was a member of Wolverhampton & Bilston Athletics Club, competing in the javelin throw and multi-event disciplines. In 1972, aged 16, Sanderson won the Intermediate javelin event at the English Schools' Athletics Championships. She was selected to compete in the javelin throw at the 1973 European Athletics Junior Championships the following year, where she reached the final but finished 12th with a throw of 39.18 m (128 ft 6 1/2 in) – well behind the winner, Tonya Khristova of Bulgaria, who threw 54.84 m (179 ft 11 in). Sanderson then decided to focus on the javelin throw rather than the pentathlon, partly because she thought that javelin competitions would provide more opportunities for travel. She made her senior international debut in the javelin throw at the 1974 British Commonwealth Games, finishing fifth. Later that year, Sanderson finished 13th in the 1974 European Athletics Championships. She broke the British javelin-throw junior record five times, achieving a distance of 55.04 m (180 ft 6 3/4 in) in 1974. Sanderson set the national record in 1976, throwing 56.14 m (184 ft 2 in), and went on to set ten national records and five Commonwealth records.

The 1976 season saw Sanderson's debut at the Olympics. Aged 20, she was the youngest competitor in her event and threw 57.00 m (187 ft 0 in) to finish ninth. In July 1977, at the European Cup semi-finals in Dublin, she threw 67.20 m (220 ft 5 1/2 in) – a national record and the second-longest distance by a woman at the time. At the European Cup finals, Ruth Fuchs of East Germany won the gold and Sanderson took the silver. Later that year, Sanderson was the bronze medalist at the 1977 IAAF World Cup.

Sanderson won her first major gold medal with a throw of 61.34 m (201 ft 2 3/4 in) in the 1978 Commonwealth Games, the first time England had won Commonwealth gold in the women's javelin since 1962. A few weeks later, Sanderson took silver at the 1978 European Athletics Championships behind Fuchs; she was the bronze medalist at the 1979 European Cup again behind Fuchs, both of them losing out to Romanian Éva Ráduly-Zörgő. Selected for the 1980 Summer Olympics, she failed to meet the qualifying standard for the final, reaching only 48.76 m (159 ft 11 1/2 in) with her first throw and having her other two attempts declared no-throws.

After the 1980 Summer Olympic Games, Sanderson asked Wilf Paish of the Carnegie Institute of Physical Education in Leeds to become her coach, and lived with his family once he agreed. A throw of 61.56 m (201 ft 11 1/2 in) was enough for Sanderson to win at the 1981 Pacific Conference Games. At the 1981 European Cup, she was runner-up behind Antoaneta Todorova of Bulgaria who made a world-record throw of 71.88 m (235 ft 9 3/4 in). She also competed in the pentathlon and heptathlon, setting UK and Commonwealth records for the heptathlon twice in 1981. Later that year, Sanderson had an achilles tendon rupture in her left leg and broke a bone in her throwing arm. Surgery on her Achilles tendon was unsuccessful, and she required another operation; the injuries prevented her from competing for 22 months. After returning, Sanderson achieved her career-best javelin throw of 73.58 m (241 ft 4 3/4 in) at the Tarmac Games in Edinburgh on 26 June 1983. It was the third-longest throw by a woman at the time, when the record was 74.76 m (245 ft 3 1/4 in) thrown by Tiina Lillak of Finland ten days previously. Sanderson finished fourth at the 1983 World Championships; another British competitor, Fatima Whitbread, who was coming to the fore as her rival, won silver. After re-injuring her Achilles tendon at the championship, Sanderson had surgery on both Achilles tendons a few days after the competition ended.

=== Olympic gold and later career ===
Sanderson won the gold medal at the 1984 Summer Olympics in the javelin, setting a new Olympic record with her throw of 69.56 m (228 ft 2 1/2 in). Whitbread won the bronze; it was Great Britain's first Olympic win in a throwing event since the modern Olympics began in 1896. Sanderson is the first Black British woman to win an Olympic gold medal. Sanderson wrote in her 1986 autobiography that following her Olympic victory, she had not intended to compete in the following athletics season, but she did take part in several competitions after being persuaded by her management company IMG to do so. Although she finished behind Whitbread in five successive meetings, Sanderson did produce the fourth-longest women's javelin throw of the year. She won gold at the 1986 Commonwealth Games in Edinburgh, and Whitbread took the silver medal.

In March 1987, Sanderson announced that she would change her focus from the javelin throw to the heptathlon. Shortly before then, she had moved to London and was looking for a career in television or promotional work. In fact, she only competed in one heptathlon after this, in July. At the Dairy Crest Games in August, Whitbread (who had been undefeated during the season) injured her shoulder; Sanderson won the event. Sanderson then announced that she would train with Mick Hill in Italy for the world championships. Whitbread won the world championship, and Sanderson finished fourth.

About ten days before participating in the 1988 Summer Olympics as defending champion, Sanderson burst the skin around her ankle and exposed her Achilles tendon. She failed to qualify for the final and left the competition limping, with blood visible on the bandage on her injured ankle. Sanderson left the stadium on crutches before the medal ceremony, where Whitbread received the silver medal behind Petra Felke from East Germany.

Sanderson announced after the 1988 Olympics that she would retire from the javelin throw, but made an unexpected return to competition in 1989 at the McVitie's International Challenge; she finished third. She also finished third at the 1989 European Cup, despite not being in top condition. At the 1990 Commonwealth Games, a throw of 65.72 m (215 ft 7 1/4 in) was enough for Sanderson to retain her title. She finished 12th at the 1990 European Athletics Championships, but was later moved up to 11th. Aged 35, Sanderson won at the 1991 European Cup over a field which included world-record holder Felke.

Her fifth Olympic Games appearance, at the 1992 Summer Olympics, set a record for Olympic appearances by a British athlete. Sanderson's best throw, 63.58 m (208 ft 7 in), was almost five metres less than the winning throw of 68.34 m (224 ft 2 1/2 in) by Silke Renk and 3.28 metres less than bronze medalist Karen Forkel. She won gold at the 1992 World Cup with a throw of 61.86 m (202 ft 11 1/4 in), nearly three metres further than any other competitor.

=== Rivalry with Fatima Whitbread ===
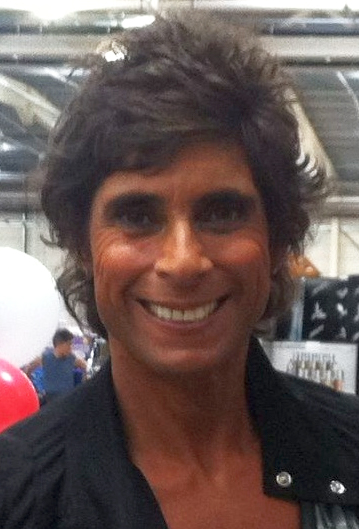
Fatima Whitbread, whose rivalry with Sanderson was often written about in the British press

Alan Hubbard wrote in a 1990 article in The Observer about Sanderson and Whitbread that "their hate-hate relationship has been one of the most enduring in British sport", lasting almost a decade. The same year, Matthew Engel wrote in The Guardian that "the Sanderson-Whitbread feud is, of course, one of the most splendid in sport", and Tom Lamont, in the same newspaper 29 years later, commented that "Whitbread and Sanderson were always uneasy rivals and the enmity that developed during their overlapping careers became as famous as their achievements, and seems to survive in their retirement". Hubbard cited Sanderson's perception that Whitbread received preferential treatment from the British Amateur Athletic Board. The Board's promotions officer, Andy Norman, who had a role in setting British athletes' fees, was a family friend of Whitbread and her mother and coach, Margaret. Margaret Whitbread was also the national coach for women's javelin in 1985, when her daughter participated in many international events while Sanderson only competed in one in the season ending in June 1985. In 1987, Sanderson threatened to boycott athletics events, for which she was being paid £1,000 each by British Athletics compared to Whitbread's £10,000. Sanderson agreed to a new deal at the beginning of June that year. Sanderson also objected to the endorsement that the Whitbreads had given to the Australian athlete Sue Howland, who competed at the 1990 Commonwealth Games after a two-year doping suspension, saying that she felt that they should have supported British athletes instead.

During their respective careers, Sanderson won an Olympic and three Commonwealth golds, and Whitbread gained one world and one European title. In all, Sanderson placed higher in 27 of the 45 times that they faced each other in competition, although Whitbread had the better results of the pair from 1984 to 1987. In 2019, Sanderson told an interviewer from The Daily Telegraph that although she had initially been on friendly terms with Whitbread, before "the competition got to Whitbread's head" and they fell out, "The rivalry was one of the best things when you look at it now. It drove me to another level. It made me want to beat her every time. It's calmer now. I respect her and I hope she respects me."

=== Return to competition ===
After a four-year hiatus, Sanderson returned to track and field competition in 1996. She set masters (over-40) record throws of 58.18 m (190 ft 10 1/2 in) and 60.64 m (198 ft 11 1/4 in) with her first two throws in May, surpassing the previous record of 51.84 m (170 ft 3/4 in). After two further masters-record throws, Sanderson increased the record to 64.06 m (210 ft 2 in) at the Securicor Games in July. At the 1996 Summer Olympics, she became the second track and field athlete (after Romanian discus thrower Lia Manoliu) to compete at six Olympics but did not qualify for the final. Sanderson also failed to qualify for the final at the 1997 World Championships, her last international appearance. Sanderson retired from competition in 1997; Whitbread had retired five years earlier.

During the 1970s, the use of performance-enhancing drugs was common in throwing events; Sanderson spoke against the practice, consistently maintaining an anti-doping stance. Her rival, two-time Olympic champion Fuchs, later admitted using steroids in the East German sports programme. The East German team did not compete in the 1984 Olympic Games as they participated in a wider boycott led by the Soviet Union. Sanderson told reporters from The Daily Telegraph in 2021 that she felt during her career she had been "robbed" of medals by losing to competitors using drugs.

== Outside competition ==
Sanderson has appeared as a guest on several television shows, including panel games A Question of Sport (in 1979), Bullseye (1984), Through the Keyhole (1987), Catchphrase Celebrity Special (1991) and Celebrity Wife Swap (2009). When Sky News was launched in 1989, Sanderson was a sports reporter for the channel, and she also co-hosted ITV's light-entertainment programme Surprise Surprise with Cilla Black. In 2012, Sanderson was in "Billy's Olympic Nightmare", a BBC Red Button episode of soap opera EastEnders, and was a contestant on ITV's Dancing on Ice Goes Gold in the same year. At age 58, she began modelling for the Grey Model Agency.

Sanderson was vice-chair of Sport England from 1999 to 2005. In 2006, she founded an academy in Newham which helped to find and train athletes to represent Britain in the 2012 Summer Olympics. The Tessa Sanderson Foundation and Academy was established in September 2009 to encourage young people and people with disabilities to take up sport with mentoring and support.

From 2009 to 2013, Sanderson organised an annual 10 km race in Newham; part of the route was through Olympic Park. Although the 2013 event attracted 3,000 participants (representing 45 different nationalities), it was cancelled in 2014; Sanderson said that the Newham Council wanted to double its fee, and delayed meeting about the race. Sanderson was appointed to the board of the Olympic Park Legacy Company, chaired by Baroness Ford, to "develop and manage" the park after the 2012 Olympics.

== Honours ==
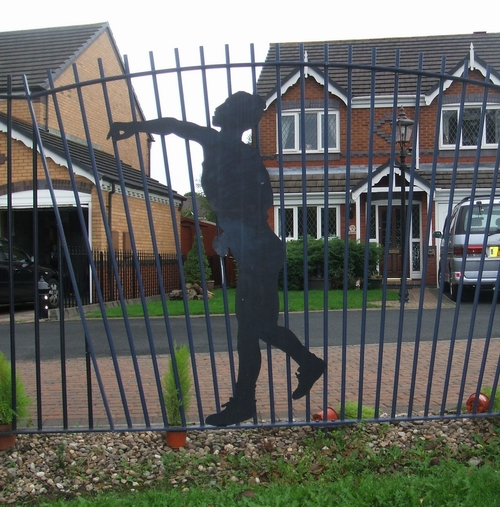
Fence in Sanderson Park

Sanderson, the British Athletics Writers' Association Athlete of the Year in 1977, 1978 and 1984, was inducted into the England Athletics Hall of Fame in 2012. Candidates for the Hall of Fame are selected by a panel of experts and then voted on by the public. She was appointed a Member of the Order of the British Empire (MBE) in the 1985 New Year Honours after her Olympic gold-medal performance, raised to Officer (OBE) in the 1998 New Year Honours for her charity work, and to Commander (CBE) in the 2004 New Year Honours for her service to Sport England.

Sanderson is an honorary graduate of the University of Wolverhampton, and was made an Honorary Fellow of London South Bank University in 2004. That year, she was one of 100 Great Black Britons in a poll taken after the BBC's 100 Greatest Britons failed to include any Black Britons. Later that year, Sanderson received a Sportswomen of the Year Lifetime Achievement award from The Sunday Times. A housing estate in Wednesfield near where she began learning the javelin throw was named Sanderson Park after her. Two roads are named after her: Tessa Sanderson Place is near Wandsworth Road in South London, and Tessa Sanderson Way is in Greenford, West London.

== Personal life ==
Sanderson has spoken about the discrimination she has experienced as a black woman. She told The Guardian in 1990 that she had faced racial discrimination (although not in her sporting career), and she felt that sexism was the reason women athletes were not adequately paid. Sanderson experienced racist language and behaviour in school (including being spat on), and has spoken about receiving a racist letter saying that she was not truly British after her 1984 Olympic gold medal. She told Sky Sports in October 2020, "Black athletes didn't have the voice they have now, so I just had to fight my own battles", and expressed disappointment at the continuing lack of Black, Asian and minority representation in sports governing bodies.

Tessa: My Life in Athletics, Sanderson's autobiography, was published in 1986. In 1990, she sued several newspapers and was awarded £30,000 in damages by the High Court of Justice for claims that she had "stolen another woman's husband". Sanderson said that her affair with the man, Derrick Evans (a fitness instructor known as Mr Motivator) began after his marriage had broken up. Sanderson had starred in the fitness videos Cardiofunk (1990) and Body Blitz (c. 1992) with Evans.

On 3 May 2010, Sanderson married former judo Olympian Densign White at St Paul's Cathedral in London. Her bridesmaids were fellow Olympic teammates Sharron Davies, Kelly Holmes and Christine Ohuruogu. She had three unsuccessful in vitro fertilisation treatments by the age of 50. Sanderson and White began fostering four-month-old twins Cassius and Ruby Mae in 2013 and adopted them the following year, when Sanderson was 58. Her nephew, Dion Sanderson, is a footballer who debuted with Wolverhampton Wanderers in October 2019.

== Career statistics ==
=== Personal bests ===
Personal best performances by Tessa Sanderson
Event	Best	Date	Notes	Ref.
Javelin throw	73.58 m	26 June 1983	in Edinburgh	
200 m	24.89 s	July 1981	Brussels (European Cup semi-final)	
400 m	57.3 s	1972		
800 m	2:26.20	July 1981	Brussels (European Cup semi-final)	
100 m hurdles	13.46 s	25 July 1981	at Crystal Palace	
400 m hurdles	60.46 s	11 June 1977	Cwmbran Stadium (1977 UK Athletics Championships)	
High jump	1.69 m	13 January 1973	at the Cosford Games	
Long jump	5.97 m	July 1981	Brussels (European Cup semi-final)	
Shot put	13.27 m	1981		
Heptathlon	6125 pts	July 1981	Brussels (European Cup semi-final)	
60 m hurdles (indoors)	8.5 s	26 February 1977	at Cosford	
Pentathlon (indoors)	3623 pts	1973		

=== Seasonal bests ===
The table below shows Sanderson's best javelin performance per season. Raw data

==== Season rankings ====
Sanderson's position in the rankings of women's javelin throw athletes, based on their longest throw in the year. Only positions in the top 25 are shown. Raw data

=== International competitions ===
The table shows Sanderson's performances representing Great Britain and England in international competitions.

Tessa Sanderson's javelin throw record
Year	Competition	Venue	Position	Distance	Ref.
1973	European Junior Championships	Duisburg, West Germany	12th	39.18 m	
1974	British Commonwealth Games	Christchurch, New Zealand	5th	48.54 m	
1974	European Championships	Rome, Italy	13th (q) (Note: Position in qualifying round)	53.28 m	
1976	Olympic Games	Montreal, Canada	10th	57.18 m	
1977	European Cup	Helsinki, Finland	2nd	62.36 m	
1977	World Cup (Note: representing Europe)	Düsseldorf, West Germany	3rd	60.30 m	
1978	Commonwealth Games	Edmonton, Canada	1st	61.34 m	
1978	European Championships	Prague, Czechoslovakia	2nd	62.40 m	
1979	European Cup	Turin, Italy	3rd	62.38 m	
1980	Olympic Games	Moscow, Soviet Union	19th (q)	48.76 m	
1981	Pacific Conference Games	Christchurch, New Zealand	1st	61.56 m	
1981	European Cup	Zagreb, Yugoslavia	2nd	65.94 m	
1983	World Championships	Helsinki, Finland	4th	64.76 m	
1984	Olympic Games	Los Angeles, United States	1st	69.56 m	
1986	Commonwealth Games	Edinburgh, Scotland	1st	69.80 m	
1987	World Championships	Rome, Italy	4th	67.54 m	
1988	Olympic Games	Seoul, South Korea	21st (q)	56.70 m	
1989	European Cup	Gateshead, United Kingdom	3rd	59.72 m	
1990	Commonwealth Games	Auckland, New Zealand	1st	65.72 m	
1990	European Championships	Split, Yugoslavia	12th	57.56 m	
1991	European Cup	Frankfurt, Germany	1st	65.18 m	
1992	Olympic Games	Barcelona, Spain	4th	63.58 m	
1992	World Cup	Havana, Cuba	1st	61.86 m	
1996	European Cup	Madrid, Spain	4th	58.18 m	
1996	Olympic Games	Atlanta, United States	14th (q)	58.86 m	
1997	World Championships	Athens, Greece	18th (q)	57.84 m	

"(q)" denotes position in qualifying round.

=== National titles ===
- AAA Junior Championships (under 17): 1971 and 1972
- English Schools Champion: 1972 (intermediate) and 1973 (senior)
- British Schools International match: 1973
- English Commonwealth Games trials: 1973 and 1978
- British Olympic Games trials: 1976 and 1984
- 10 times AAA National Champion: 1975, 1976, 1977, 1979, 1980, 1985, 1989, 1990, 1992, 1996
- 3 times UK National Champion: 1977, 1978, 1997

=== Midland Counties Championships ===
These were competitions for women based in the English Midlands counties of Avon, Gloucestershire, Hereford and Worcester, Leicestershire, Northamptonshire, Nottinghamshire, Salop, Staffordshire, Warwickshire and West Midlands. (Note: The criteria for eligibility for county championships were "bring born in the county, having lived continuously in the county for nine months before the competition date, or having nine months of service in HM [Armed] Forces stationed within the county".)

- Javelin throw: 1974, 1975, 1977
- Pentathlon: 1976
- 400 m hurdles: 1977

== See also ==
- Javelin throw at the Olympics
- List of athletes with the most appearances at Olympic Games
- List of Olympic medalists in athletics (women)
- List of Commonwealth Games medallists in athletics (women)
- List of European Athletics Championships medalists (women)
- List of javelin throwers
