= Murder of Breck Bednar =

2014 murder in the United Kingdom

Breck Bednar
- Family photograph of Bednar
- Date: 17 February 2014
- Location: Grays, Essex, England
- Cause: Stab wound to the neck
- Burial: St John the Evangelist in Caterham
- Convictions: Lewis Daynes
- Sentence: Minimum term of 25 years

Breck David LaFave Bednar (17 March 1999 – 17 February 2014) was an English-American teenager from Caterham, Surrey, who was murdered by 18-year-old Lewis Daynes on 17 February 2014, at Daynes' flat in Grays, Essex. Bednar knew Daynes only through online gaming and had never met him in person until he visited Daynes' flat on the day of the murder. Daynes pleaded guilty and was sentenced to life imprisonment with a minimum term of 25 years.

== Victim ==
Breck Bednar was born on 17 March 1999. From 2010 to 2012, he had attended Caterham School and in 2014 was a student at St Bede's School in Redhill, Surrey, and a member of 135 Squadron Air Training Corps, also in Redhill. He attended St John the Evangelist church in Caterham. Bednar's mother described him as relaxed and warm-hearted, playing video games online with many friends after school and passionate about computing. He enjoyed creative play growing up.

Bednar's parents, Barry Bednar and Lorin LaFave, were born in the United States. The family moved to England three years before his birth, due to Barry's job as an oil trader and shipping consultant requiring him to move. Lorin is a teaching assistant. In 2014, the Evening Standard reported that the family lived with their three children – Bednar's younger siblings – in a family home in Caterham.

== Circumstances of death ==
Bednar's mother was reported to have "limited his access to electronics, installed parental controls and forbade him from using the same server as a boy she had grown suspicious of." She recalled, "His personality was changing and his ideology was changing and he was starting to refuse to attend church with us. I felt like it was because of the negative influence of this person."

On 17 December 2013, LaFave called Surrey Police expressing concerns about online grooming; she said she warned police that her son was in danger. Nonetheless, it was reported, "The teenagers had been playing games online for several months, despite LaFave's efforts to put an end to their relationship."

On 17 February 2014, Bednar travelled by taxi to Daynes' flat. Later that day, his father, with whom he had been expected to spend the weekend, sent a text message to tell LaFave that Breck had not arrived. A few hours later his siblings, 12-year-old triplets, began to receive messages that their brother had been murdered, describing photos of Bednar that had been posted on social media, which were soon confirmed by the police.

The photos, showing Bednar's body, were posted to other members of the six-person online gaming group. Word spread, leading to a friend's text message to one of the triplets, "Is it true about your brother? If it's true, it's so sad." At the same time, police were telling Bednar's parents the news that their son had been murdered.

Police and paramedics were called to the flat where Bednar was found with stab wounds to his neck, deceased.

== Perpetrator ==
Lewis Daynes was believed to have met Bednar while playing online games. The Daily Telegraph described Daynes as a "baby-faced killer" who looked "much younger than his 19 years". According to a report by the Daily Mirror, he had grown up as an only child. After his parents separated, he initially lived with his mother until her new husband got a job overseas. He then moved in first with his father, then with his grandparents. It was reported that he had also been in the care system for an unknown period of time. When he was aged 16, Daynes lived alone in a flat owned by his grandparents; his neighbours described him as "reclusive".

Prosecutor Richard Whittam, QC, told the court, "The prosecution case was that at the time of his murder Breck was aged 14. The law makes specific provision for the murder of a child involving sexual or sadistic motivation. The prosecution has advanced the case on that basis and anticipate doing that again on the date of sentence". Simon Mayo, QC, mitigating, said Daynes had Asperger syndrome, which "affects his ability to make sound judgments". Mayo also argued that there was not enough evidence to prove that the murder had been premeditated.

Upon pleading guilty, Daynes was given a life sentence and will serve a minimum term of 25 years in prison. Crown Prosecutor Jenny Hopkins said, "Our case was that Lewis Daynes, even though he was only 18 when he committed Breck's murder, was a controlling and manipulative individual who carefully planned this crime. The degree of planning and manipulation by Daynes is shocking and when you consider the young ages of perpetrator and victim, it stands out as one of the most cruel, violent and unusual cases we have dealt with".

== Legacy ==
Bednar's family established The Breck Foundation to raise awareness of online dangers and promote responsible use of the Internet. His mother was quoted by the BBC as saying: "I want Breck's tragedy to open the eyes of everyone, to recognise the dangers of online predators. It is a very real danger today. We all need to look after each other". His mother asked his favourite band, Coldplay, to help raise awareness of online dangers. She told ABC News, "People think it only happens to anti-social kids, but it's just not true".

LaFave has called for "more help from the government for online safety", saying that she had expected more feedback from Surrey Police and adding, "I also wasn't recommended to contact CEOPC (Child Exploitation and Online Protection Centre), which I found out – when it was too late – is a really great agency that will help parents".

After Daynes' plea in court, Assistant Chief Constable Gavin Stephens said the handling of Bednar's case by Surrey Police had been referred to the Independent Police Complaints Commission (IPCC): "Following Breck's death we carried out a review of practices in our call handling centre and implemented changes to improve the way information is handled and shared. Due to the prior contact the case was referred to the IPCC. They have since decided to conduct an independent investigation into the actions taken by Surrey Police following this communication".

According to ABC News, the family was "filing a lawsuit against Essex and Surrey police over the handling of the case". In March 2016, the family accepted a settlement in which Surrey Police apologised for their mishandling of the case, and paid an undisclosed sum in compensation.

On 26 January 2016, BBC Three broadcast a drama-documentary about the murder entitled Murder Games: The Life and Death of Breck Bednar. It was alleged, in January 2016, that Daynes had been blogging from prison.

In March 2018, in the U.S., the story was depicted on the Investigation Discovery channel in the 'Dangerous Games' episode of the Web of Lies series. In 2015, Bednar's murder was featured in the US series Stalkers Who Kill in the episode titled "Babyface Killer".

In 2019, a new play, written by Mark Wheeller and using the words of his friends and family, tells the story of how the teenager was groomed online. Game Over was published by Salamander Street in 2020.
