= Mary Knisely =

American runner (born 1959)

Mary Knisely (born Schilly; May 29, 1959) is a retired middle- and long-distance runner from the United States. She set her personal best (8:42.84) in the women's 3000-meter run on 13 July 1987 at a meet in Nice. Knisely is a two-time US national champion in the 3000 m (1986 and 1987), and was the marathon national champion in 2001. She competed as a student at Concord High School.

In 2008, the Delaware Sports Hall of Fame inducted Knisely.

She competed at the U.S. Olympic Trials three times, was a gold medalist in the 3000 meters at the 1987 Pan American Games, silver medalist in the IAAF World Cup 10,000 m, and was a member of the 1985 and 1987 gold medal winning U.S. teams at the IAAF World Cross Country Championships. She placed third in the 3000 m at the 1986 IAAF Grand Prix Final and second in the 5000 m at the 1987 IAAF Grand Prix Final.

She holds personal records of: 2:02 min (800 m) 4:05 (1500 m), 8:41 (3000 m), 15:12 (5000 m), 32:19 (10,000 m), and 2:35:11 (marathon).
