= Sue Howland =

Australian javelin thrower (born 1960)

Personal information
- Nationality: Australian
- Born: 9 April 1960 (age 66)

Sport
- Sport: Track and field
- Event: Javelin
Medal record
Women's athletics
Representing Australia
Commonwealth Games
Gold medal – first place	1982 Brisbane	Women's javelin throw
Bronze medal – third place	1986 Edinburgh	Women's javelin throw
Silver medal – second place	1990 Auckland	Women's javelin throw

Sue Howland (born 4 September 1960) is an Australian javelin thrower whose best result was a gold medal at the 1982 Commonwealth Games. Howland won the Australian Junior (under 20) Javelin throw in 1977 and 1978. Her international career began in 1981 with the Pacific Conference Games and continued to the 1992 IAAF World Cup.

She tried to retain her title at the 1986 Commonwealth Games, but ended up third behind England's Tessa Sanderson and Fatima Whitbread. In 1987, just prior to the Rome World Championships, Howland was ranked third in the world for her event and was a medal prospect. However, after having been detected taking banned drugs, she was disqualified from competition for 2 years just prior to the championships. In September 1987, Howland tested positive for performance-enhancing drugs.

After serving a two-year disqualification for using performance-enhancing drugs, Howland returned to competition in 1989 and in 1990 she won the silver medal in the 1990 Commonwealth Games javelin throw.

Howland's career personal best was a throw of 69.80 metres in 1986.

== Role in doping in Australia ==
Howland has been credited with being one of a select few Australian athletes who openly admitted to using drugs and explaining the culture of drug use in the sport. Howland and another former Australian Institute of Sport athlete Gael Martin, along with AIS coach Kevin Giles, appeared on the ABC Four Corners program on 30 November 1987 on a segment entitled "The Winning Edge" which examined the use of anabolic steroids in Australia. The two athletes and coach suggested that if an athlete wanted to do well at an elite level it was necessary to use ergogenic aids, and asserted drug use was widespread internationally. It was this segment, which implied use of steroids at the AIS facility, that led to the eventual Senate enquiry in drugs in sport in Australia. The Channel 9 Sunday Program reported that "To date she is about the only athlete who never denied taking drugs." She gave voluntary evidence at the Senate Enquiry into drug use in Australian Sport in 1990. This enquiry led to the establishment of the independent Australian Sports Anti-Doping Authority just one year after the completion of the enquiry.

The Senate report (known as the "Black" report after Senator John Black) found that Maurie Plant had asked Jane Flemming to provide a urine sample to substitute for Sue Howland's sample for a drug test.
