= Wilf Paish =

Wilfred Henry Charles Paish MBE (29 July 1932 – 29 January 2010) was a British athletics coach. He helped train athletes such as Olympic champion Tessa Sanderson, Mick Hill and Peter Elliott. Paish was chief coach for South Africa at the 1996 Summer Olympics in Atlanta.

== Personal and family life ==
Paish married Margaret L. Norman in 1957 and they had two daughters Alison and Joanne. In 1999 his youngest daughter Joanne had his twin granddaughters Samantha and Kayleigh. His hobby was philately, and in the 1980s he was a well-known figure, as a part-time stamp dealer, at stamp fairs in the West Yorkshire area. Paish was appointed a Member of the Order of the British Empire (MBE) in the 2005 Birthday Honours for services to sport.

He died after a long illness at the age of 77 on 29 January 2010. In 2012 Paish was inducted into the England Athletics Hall of Fame.
