= 1986 IAAF Grand Prix Final =

- Host city: Rome, Italy
- Events: 17
- Dates: 10 September
- Main venue: Stadio Olimpico

The 1986 IAAF Grand Prix Final was the second edition of the season-ending competition for the IAAF Grand Prix track and field circuit, organised by the International Association of Athletics Federations. It was held at the Stadio Olimpico in Rome, Italy on 10 September 1986. Saïd Aouita (5000 metres) and Yordanka Donkova (100 metres hurdles) were the overall points winners of the tournament.

== Medal summary ==
=== Men ===
Event	Gold		Silver		Bronze	
100 metres	Ben Johnson (CAN)	10.02	Chidi Imoh (NGR)	10.08	Linford Christie (GBR)	10.15
800 metres	Peter Elliott (GBR)	1:46.91	William Wuycke (VEN)	1:47.03	Earl Jones (USA)	1:47.16
One mile	Steve Scott (USA)	3:50.28	José Manuel Abascal (ESP)	3:50.54	John Walker (NZL)	3:50.93
5000 metres	Saïd Aouita (MAR)	13:13.13	Stefano Mei (ITA)	13:14.29	Sydney Maree (USA)	13:14.62
3000 metres steeplechase	William Van Dijck (BEL)	8:25.34	Hagen Melzer (GDR)	8:25.65	Henry Marsh (USA)	8:25.85
400 m hurdles	Andre Phillips (USA)	48.14	Amadou Dia Bâ (SEN)	48.47	Danny Harris (USA)	49.28
High jump	Igor Paklin (URS)	2.34 m	Jim Howard (USA)	2.31 m	Doug Nordquist (USA)	2.28 m
Triple jump	Mike Conley, Sr. (USA)	17.16 m	Dario Badinelli (ITA)	16.82 m	Joseph Taiwo (NGR)	16.79 m
Shot put	Ulf Timmermann (GDR)	21.67 m	Werner Günthör (SUI)	21.61 m	Alessandro Andrei (ITA)	21.20 m
Hammer throw	Sergey Litvinov (URS)	84.88 m	Yuriy Sedykh (URS)	81.98 m	Igor Nikulin (URS)	79.84 m

=== Women ===
Event	Gold		Silver		Bronze	
200 metres	Valerie Brisco-Hooks (USA)	22.30	Evelyn Ashford (USA)	22.31	Ewa Kasprzyk (POL)	22.58
400 metres	Marita Koch (GDR)	49.17	Valerie Brisco-Hooks (USA)	50.21	Diane Dixon (USA)	50.64
1500 metres	Tatyana Samolenko (URS)	4:02.71	Maricica Puică (ROM)	4:03.55	Kirsty Wade (GBR)	4:03.74
5000 metres	Olga Bondarenko (URS)	15:16.84	Svetlana Guskova (URS)	15:17.95	Mary Knisely (USA)	15:22.33
100 m hurdles	Yordanka Donkova (BUL)	12.47	Ginka Zagorcheva (BUL)	12.49	Cornelia Oschkenat (GDR)	12.71
Discus throw	Tsvetanka Khristova (BUL)	68.90 m	Svetla Mitkova (BUL)	58.98 m	Márta Kripli (HUN)	58.52 m
Javelin throw	Petra Felke (GDR)	70.64 m	Fatima Whitbread (GBR)	69.40 m	Tiina Lillak (FIN)	65.46 m

== Points leaders ==
=== Men ===
Event	Gold		Silver		Bronze	
Overall	Saïd Aouita (MAR)	63	Andre Phillips (USA)	61	Steve Scott (USA)	61
100 metres	Chidi Imoh (NGR)	57	Ben Johnson (CAN)	54	Harvey Glance (USA)	41
800 metres	José Luíz Barbosa (BRA)	50	Earl Jones (USA)	49	William Wuycke (VEN)	49
One mile	Steve Scott (USA)	61	José Luis González (ESP)	42	Jim Spivey (USA)	37
5000 metres	Saïd Aouita (MAR)	54	Vincent Rousseau (BEL)	47	Stefano Mei (ITA)	38
3000 metres steeplechase	William Van Dijck (BEL)	54	Henry Marsh (USA)	52	Graeme Fell (CAN)	39
400 hurdles	Andre Phillips (USA)	61	Danny Harris (USA)	57	Amadou Dia Bâ (SEN)	46
High jump	Jim Howard (USA)	59	Doug Nordquist (USA)	52.5	Igor Paklin (URS)	50.75
Triple jump	Mike Conley, Sr. (USA)	61	Khristo Markov (BUL)	46	Joseph Taiwo (NGR)	44
Shot put	Werner Günthör (SUI)	44	Ron Backes (USA)	40	John Brenner (USA)	38
Hammer throw	Yuriy Sedykh (URS)	57	Sergey Litvinov (URS)	50	Jüri Tamm (URS)	31

=== Women ===
Event	Gold		Silver		Bronze	
Overall	Yordanka Donkova (BUL)	69	Maricica Puică (ROM)	65	Tsvetanka Khristova (BUL)	63
200 metres	Evelyn Ashford (USA)	59	Ewa Kasprzyk (POL)	49	Valerie Brisco-Hooks (USA)	43
400 metres	Diane Dixon (USA)	53	Valerie Brisco-Hooks (USA)	51	Lillie Leatherwood (USA)	45
1500 metres	Maricica Puică (ROM)	62	Doina Melinte (ROM)	51	Cornelia Bürki (SUI)	33
5000 metres	Svetlana Guskova (URS)	41	PattiSue Plumer (USA)	41	Mary Knisely (USA)	39
100 hurdles	Yordanka Donkova (BUL)	69	Cornelia Oschkenat (GDR)	52	Ginka Zagorcheva (BUL)	47
Discus throw	Tsvetanka Khristova (BUL)	63	Svetla Mitkova (BUL)	39	Márta Kripli (HUN)	28
Javelin throw	Petra Felke (GDR)	63	Fatima Whitbread (GBR)	59	Trine Solberg (NOR)	43
