= Thurrock Town Hall =

Municipal building in Grays, Essex, England

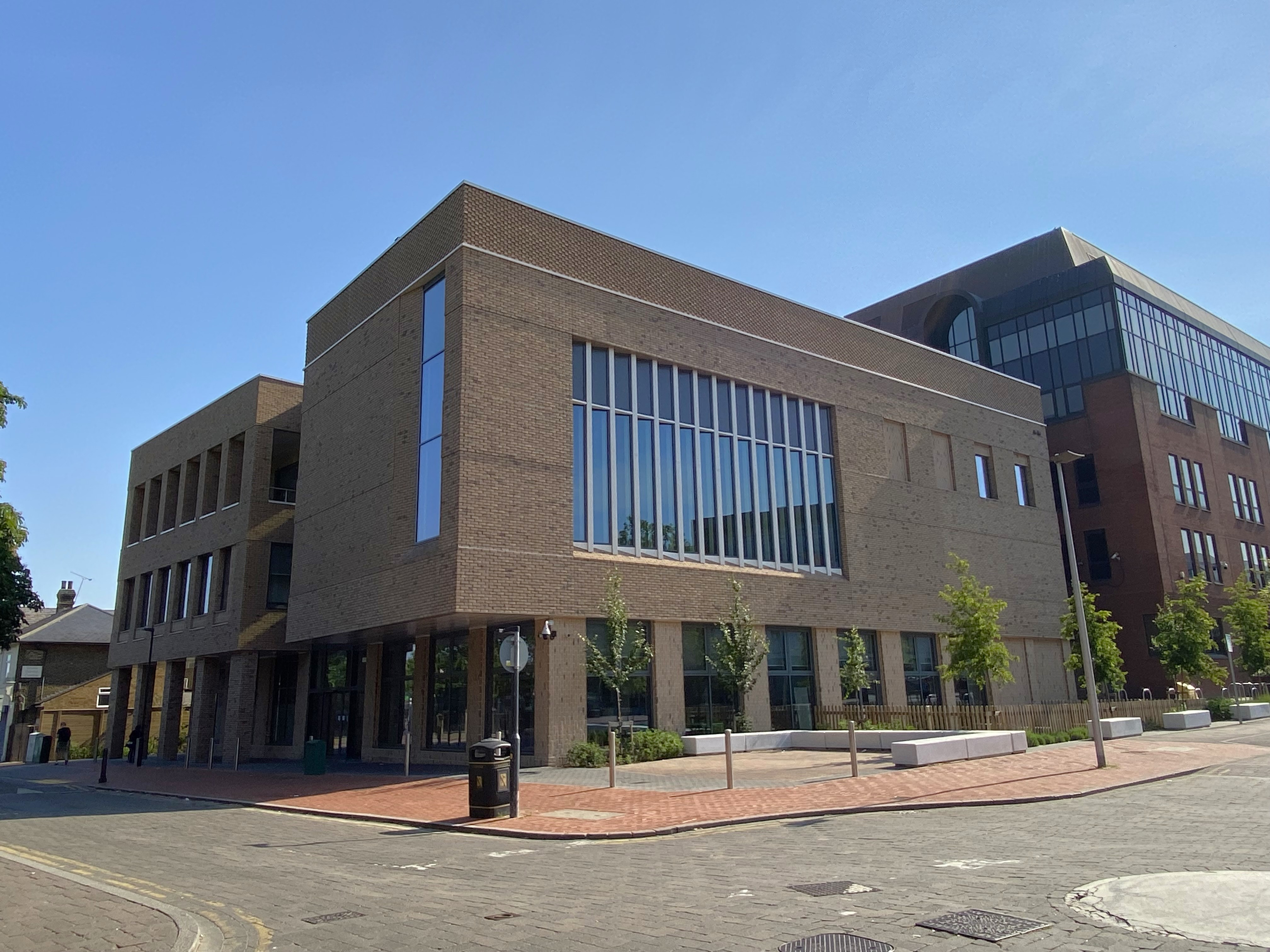
- The 2022 section of the complex

- Shown in Essex
- 51.4755°N 0.3241°E
- Location: New Road, Grays

History
- Built: 1986

Site notes
- Architectural style: Modern style

Thurrock Town Hall is a newest part of municipal complex in New Road in Grays, Essex, a town in England. The complex accommodates the offices and meeting place of Thurrock Council.

== History ==
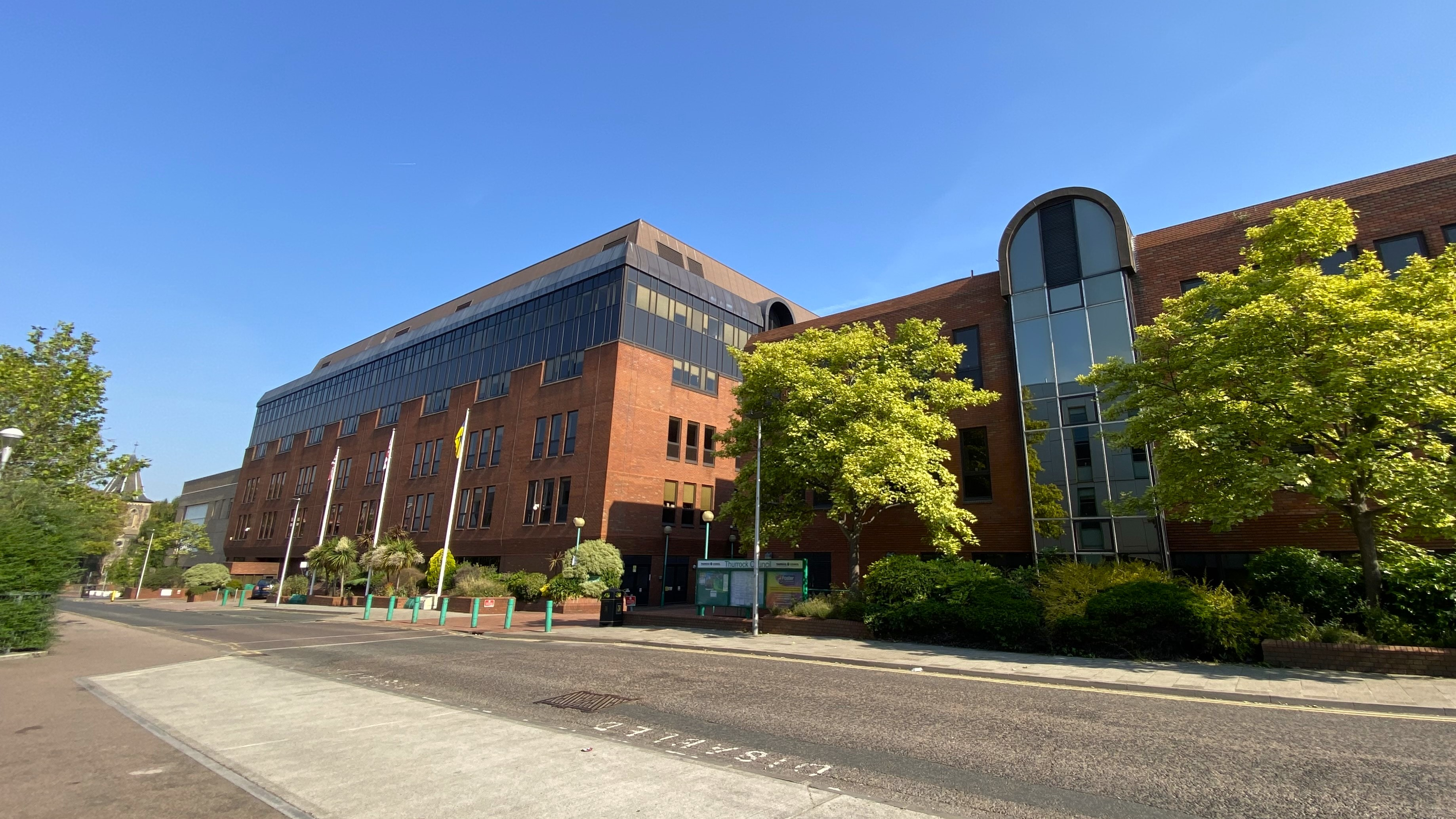
The 1992 extension (left) and 1986 building (right)

Following significant population growth, largely associated with chemical manufacturing, a local board of health was established in Grays in 1886. The board was succeeded by Grays Thurrock Urban District Council in 1894, and council offices were established at No. 53 High Street. After the urban districts of Grays Thurrock, Purfleet and Tilbury, as well as the Orsett Rural District were amalgamated to form Thurrock Urban District Council in 1936, the enlarged council established its offices in a house, previously known as "Farley", in Whitehall Lane in Grays. This remained the meeting place for Thurrock Council after it was formed in 1974.

However, in the early 1980s, in the context of the increased responsibilities of local authorities, council leaders decided that they needed more substantial facilities. The oldest part of the new complex was the eastern section, on the corner with Derby Road. It was designed in the modern style, built in red brick and opened as Thurrock Council Offices in 1986. This building later became known as Council Offices Building 1 ('CO1'). The design of the three-storey building involved an asymmetrical main frontage of 11 bays facing onto New Road. The eighth bay contained a full-height plate-glass wall, which was projected forward and surmounted by a semi-circular stone clad roof. The upper floors were slightly canted forward and fenestrated by a series of tall bi-partite and tri-partite casement windows. Internally, the principal rooms were the council chamber, the committee rooms and the offices themselves.

The complex was extended to the west in a similar style in 1992. This building later became known as Council Offices Building 2 ('CO2'). Again, the first and second floors were slightly canted forward and fenestrated by a series of tall tri-partite casement windows. However, there was an additional floor which was fully clad in plate glass. Internally, the new block including a reception area and additional offices.

In October 2019, the Prime Minister, Boris Johnson, visited the council offices to sign a book of condolence commemorating 39 Vietnamese people who had died in the trailer of a refrigerator lorry.

By the 2020s, the offices needed refurbishment. The council decided to vacate the 1986 building, to refurbish the 1992 extension, and to erect an additional block even further to the west on the corner of the New Road and the High Street, facing St Peter & St Paul's Church. The site was occupied by four shops which were demolished. The new block was designed by LSI Architects, built in buff brick at a cost of £10 million and was completed in 2022. This building was known during the development phase as Council Offices Building 3 ('CO3'). The design of the new block involved an asymmetrical main frontage in two sections facing onto the High Street. Both sections were jettied out over the pavement with the left-hand section supported by piers. Internally, it incorporated a new reception area, committee rooms, a council chamber, a registry office, a cafe, and new offices.

Following its completion, the council voted to rename new building "Thurrock Town Hall". The vacated 1986 building was marketed for sale in August 2023. The council indicated that it was suitable for conversion, or for redevelopment to allow new housing to be erected on that site.
