= Treetops School =

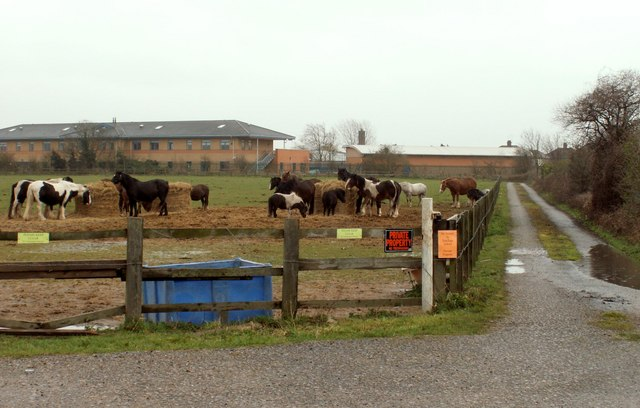
- Treetops School in the distance

Location
- Buxton Road; Grays, Essex, RM16 2WU; England; 51.49236°N 0.3557°E

Information
- Type: Special school Academy
- Established: 1930; 96 years ago
- Specialist: SEN
- Department for Education URN: 144234 Tables
- Ofsted: Reports
- Executive headteacher: Paul Smith
- Headteacher: Jon Brewer
- Gender: Mixed
- Age: 3 to 19
- Enrolment: 317
- Website: www.treetopsschool.org

Treetops School is an all-through special school with academy status in Grays, Essex, England. Students are from 5 to 19 with moderate learning difficulties and many are on the autistic spectrum, with speech and language problems. The school was first established in 1930 as the Grays Thurrock Open-Air School For 60 Delicate Children and became a special school in 1960. In 1998 it gained SEN specialisms and in 2017 it became an academy. Ofsted rated the school as outstanding in all categories, saying "Teaching is outstanding because teachers have exceptionally high expectations of what pupils can achieve and use practical activities to make learning interesting."

== History ==
The Grays Thurrock Open-Air School For 60 Delicate Children was opened in 1930 by Essex County Council. It was located on Rectory Road, Little Thurrock and most of its pupils had been released from sanatoriums. The school closed temporarily from September 1939 to March 1940 because of the Second World War, with its site being used for an Air Raid Precautions outpost. When the school reopened its site was shared on a part-time basis with two other schools in the local area. In 1960 the school relocated to a mansion known as The Elms, located on Dell Road. It became a special school and was adjacent to The Dell, a house formerly owned by Alfred Russel Wallace and one of the first to be built with concrete in the United Kingdom. The school became The Elms School and was renamed to Treetops School in 1964. This was done to avoid confusion with another house called The Elms, which was located nearby. From 1960 to 1963 the headmaster was Edward Daynes. He left for Maria Grey Training College and would be succeeded by David Phillips.

Under David Phillips Treetops School was expanded into a two-part new purpose built building. The expansion was originally meant to take place a year and a half after the school's opening but was delayed by six. The expansion had finished by July 1968 and the old building was demolished. The student capacity was raised from 75 to 160 and a special needs preschool was established. David Phillips left the school in 1974 to become the new Inspector of Schools in Essex and was replaced by Mrs. Weddell, who in turn was replaced by Mr. Hopper. Mr. Hopper served from 1975 to 1988 and was succeeded by M. Smith who served for a year, before being replaced by Mr. Pardoe. Mr. Pardoe remained head for nine years and was succeeded by Paul Smith in September 1998.

In April 1998 Thurrock was granted unitary authority status and in September of that year the government requested that the boroughs' three special schools (Woodacre, Knightsmead and Treetops) declare a SEN specialist that they would like to pursue. Treetops chose a specialism in autism, ADHD, communication disorders and speech and language impairment. The other schools chose a specialism in learning difficulties. This resulted in a decrease in popularity for Knightsmead and Woodacre and an increase for Treetops. Knightsmead and Woodacre would eventually amalgamate into the new Beacon Hill School. After seeing the advanced SEN provision in America during a cultural exchange trip, Headteacher Smith applied for a new purpose built school to be built. In the meantime the school would experience development over two campuses in Grays and South Ockendon. It was decided that the new purpose-built school would be built on the site of the old Torells School on Buxton Road. The site would be demolished and the Treetops School site would begin construction over it, being completed by February 2008.

The Treetops School has been an academy since 1 April 2017 and has recently begun construction of a new free school on its site in an effort to combat a rapidly growing local population. The free school is planned to increase the school's capacity from 224 to 450. It was opened on 1 September 2021 and is headed by Anthony Hattam. Headteacher Paul Smith retired in 2019 and was succeeded by Jon Brewer in August of that year, becoming executive head of both Treetops and the free school as the new CEO of the Treetops Learning Community.

== intu Lakeside's Charity of the Year 2017 ==
On 30 March, as part of intu Lakeside adapting its services to become more autism friendly, Lakeside revealed Treetops School to be its charity partnership for 2017. Mayor of Thurrock, Cllr Cathy Kent, commented: “I am thrilled intu Lakeside has chosen Treetops School as its charity of the year. We are very proud of Treetops and its ‘outstanding in all categories’ Ofsted status. The school has high expectations for each child and uses practical activities to make learning interesting.”

== Headteachers ==
- Edward Daynes (1960–1963)
- David Phillips (1963–1974)
- Mrs. Weddell (1974–1975)
- Mr. Hopper (1975–1988)
- M. Smith (1988–1989)
- Mr. Pardoe (1989–1998)
- Paul Smith (1998–2019)
- Jon Brewer (2019–present)
