= John Le Masurier =

British athletics coach (1917 - 2014)

John Le Masurier (July 24, 1917 – August 31, 2014) was a British athletics coach who was best known for coaching three-time Olympic medalist Mary Rand who he connected with in 1958. He also coached sprinter Dave Segal, Chris Carter and Diane Leather, who earlier had become the first woman to break five minutes for the mile. Le Masurier was also coach of the Great Britain team at the Olympic Games between 1960 and 1976.

Le Masurier was born in Guernsey. In 2010, he was inducted into the England Athletics Hall of Fame.

He served with the Royal Marines during World War II.
