= Christine Béchard =

Mauritian discus thrower

Personal information
- Born: 27 February 1963 (age 62)
- Height: 1.80 m (5 ft 11 in)
- Weight: 68 kg (150 lb)

Sport
- Sport: Track and field
- Event: Discus throw

Christine Béchard (born 27 February 1963) is a Mauritian athlete who was the first female to represent Mauritius at the Summer Olympics when she competed in the 1984 Summer Olympics.

Béchard was an all-round athlete and before competing in the Olympics she had entered in the 1982 Commonwealth Games in javelin event, where she finished in tenth place out of eleven throwers, she also had been National Champion in the 110 metre hurdles, high jump and twice champion in the javelin and discus.

The first Mauritius Olympic team consisted of four athletes, three men and Béchard, she would compete in the Women's discus throw where in the qualifying group she threw 37.94 metres and finished in seventeenth place so didn't qualify for the final the next day.

After her Olympic experience, Béchard carried on winning medals, including three golds in the high jump, discus and the heptathlon at the 1985 Indian Ocean Island Games which was held in Curepipe, Mauritius. which was followed up with three more National Championship titles in 1985 in the javelin, discus and high jump.
