= Margaret Whitbread =

English javelin thrower

Margaret Whitbread née Callender
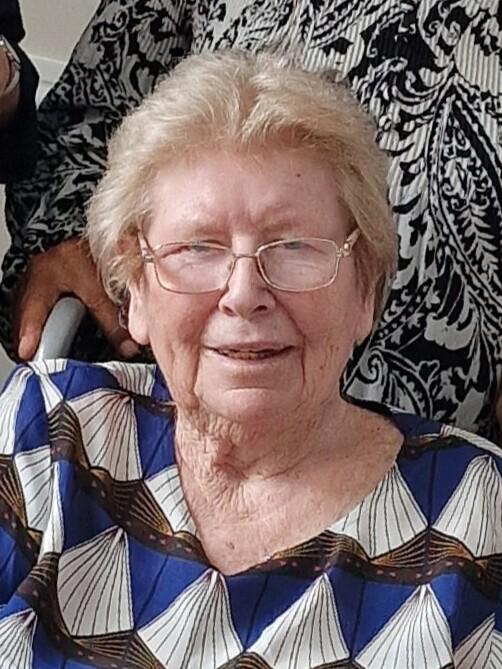
- Whitbread in 2025

Personal information
- Nationality: British (English)
- Born: 25 June 1939 (age 86) Thurrock, England

Sport
- Sport: Athletics
- Event: Javelin throw
- Club: Ilford AC

Margaret Jean Whitbread (née Callender; born 25 June 1939) is a former athlete who competed for England.

== Biography ==
Callender finished third behind Averil Williams in the javelin throw event at the 1957 WAAA Championships.

She represented England in the javelin at the 1958 British Empire and Commonwealth Games in Cardiff, Wales.

Whitbread finished third behind Sue Platt at the 1966 WAAA Championships.

In 1975 the couple adopted Fatima Whitbread and Margaret coached her at javelin.

== Honours and awards ==
In 2025, Whitbread was awarded the Freedom of the Borough by the mayor of Thurrock Sue Shinnick and leader of Thurrock Council Lynn Worrall, alongside daughter Fatima.

== Personal life ==
Margaret Callender married John Whitbread, a paper mill supervisor, in late 1959. The couple had two sons, Gregg and Kirk, and also adopted a daughter, Fatima, whom Margaret coached at javelin.
