= Jeanette Kieboom =

Australian javelin thrower

Jeanette Kieboom (born 3 September 1959) is a former javelin thrower who represented Australia at the 1978 Commonwealth Games in Edmonton, Canada, in the 1985 Pacific Conference Games in California and the 1986 Commonwealth Games in Edinburgh, Scotland. She won the national championships in 1985 and finished in the top three on five other occasions.
