= Fatima Whitbread =

British javelin thrower (born 1961)

Fatima Whitbread MBE
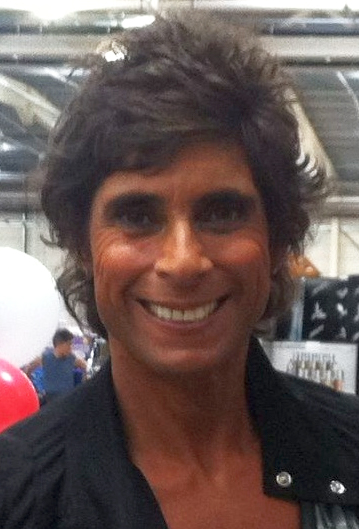
- Whitbread in 2012

Personal information
- Born: Fatima Vedad; 3 March 1961 (age 65) London, England
- Height: 1.68 m (5 ft 6 in)
- Weight: 68 kg (150 lb)
- Spouse: Andy Norman (m. 1997; div. 2006)
- Children: 1
- Parent: Margaret Whitbread (mother)

Sport
- Country: Great Britain
- Sport: Athletics
- Event: Javelin throw

Achievements and titles
- Personal best: 77.44 m (254 ft 3/4 in) (1986)
Medal record
Women's athletics
Representing Great Britain
Olympic Games
Silver medal – second place	1988 Seoul	Javelin
Bronze medal – third place	1984 Los Angeles	Javelin
World Championships
Gold medal – first place	1987 Rome	Javelin
Silver medal – second place	1983 Helsinki	Javelin
European Championships
Gold medal – first place	1986 Stuttgart	Javelin
Representing England
Commonwealth Games
Silver medal – second place	1986 Edinburgh	Javelin
Bronze medal – third place	1982 Brisbane	Javelin

Fatima Whitbread, MBE (née Vedad; born 3 March 1961) is a British retired javelin thrower. She broke the world record with a throw of 77.44 m (254 ft 3/4 in) in the qualifying round of the 1986 European Athletics Championships in Stuttgart, and became the first British athlete to set a world record in a throwing event. Whitbread went on to win the European title that year, and took the gold medal at the 1987 World Championships. She is also a two-time Olympic medallist, winning bronze at the 1984 Summer Olympics and silver at the 1988 Summer Olympics. She won the same medals, respectively, in the Commonwealth Games of 1982 and 1986.

After a difficult early childhood, Fatima Vedad was adopted by the family of Margaret Whitbread, a javelin coach. Whitbread won the 1977 English Schools' Athletics Championships intermediate title, and was selected for the 1978 Commonwealth Games, where she finished sixth. The following year, she took gold at the 1979 European Athletics Junior Championships. During her career, she had a well-publicised rivalry with another British javelin athlete, Tessa Sanderson. Whitbread's later career was affected by a long-term shoulder injury, which she believed dated back to her world record throw in 1986. The 1990 UK Athletics Championships was the last event in which she participated, sustaining a further shoulder injury there. In 1992 she formally retired from competition.

She was named the Sports Writers' Association Sportswoman of the Year in 1986 and 1987. She was appointed a Member of the Order of the British Empire (MBE) in the 1987 Birthday Honours, for services to athletics. She was voted BBC Sports Personality of the Year in 1987 and received the BBC Sports Personality of the Year Helen Rollason Award in 2023 in recognition of her triumph over the adversity of her childhood, and her continued work on behalf of other children in care environments.

In later years, Whitbread has appeared on several television programmes, including I'm a Celebrity...Get Me Out of Here! in 2011 and 2023, in which she finished in third place both times.

Whitbread was awarded an honorary doctorate from the University of Roehampton in September 2025.

== Early life ==
Fatima Vedad was born on 3 March 1961 in Stoke Newington, London, to an unmarried Turkish Cypriot mother and Greek Cypriot father. She said "I was abandoned as a baby and left to die in our flat." After being rescued, severely malnourished, "I spent the next 14 years living in institutions, among other traumatised children", occasionally being left in the care of her abusive biological mother. In a 2003 interview with The Observer, she said, "It was a nightmare of a childhood and it was only because I loved sport so much that I got through it and met my true [adoptive] mother."

Some credit for my choice of sport must go to the javelin itself. It is not only a magical event, it is a beautiful one. The flight of the javelin is a glorious sight, and, as I very soon discovered, letting go was a fantastic feeling.

— from Fatima: The Autobiography of Fatima Whitbread, (1988)

Vedad started throwing the javelin aged 11. According to her account, she had taken up an interest in track and field events after being inspired by the myth of Atalanta, "whom no man could outrun except by cheating, and whose javelin killed a terrible monster"; and by Mary Peters, who won the gold medal at the 1972 Summer Olympics' women's pentathlon.

Vedad met javelin thrower David Ottley at a stadium and asked him if she could use his javelin. He asked her to wait until the coach arrived. The coach was Margaret Whitbread, a physical education teacher at a local school, whom Vedad had previously met when Whitbread refereed a netball match that she played in. After discovering that Vedad lived at a children's home, Margaret Whitbread passed on some boots and a javelin from a girl who had retired from the event. Three years later, Vedad was adopted by Margaret Whitbread and her family. She spent her teenage years in Chadwell St Mary, Essex, where she attended the Torells School in nearby Grays.

== Career ==
=== Early career ===
Whitbread won the English Schools' Athletics Championships intermediate title in 1977, and set a national intermediate record of 158 ft 5 in (48.28 m) in winning the Amateur Athletic Association (AAA) women's championship the following month. She placed sixth in the javelin throw at the 1978 Commonwealth Games, throwing 49.16 m (161 ft 3 1/4 in). Whitbread won gold in the javelin event at the 1979 European Athletics Junior Championships, throwing 58.20 m (190 ft 11 1/4 in). She was selected for the 1980 Summer Olympics event, but, achieving only 49.74 m (163 ft 2 1/4 in), she failed to qualify for the final. At the 1982 Commonwealth Games, Whitbread took the bronze medal, throwing 58.86 m (193 ft 1 1/4 in), which was 5.6 m (18 ft 4 1/4 in) behind champion Sue Howland, from Australia.

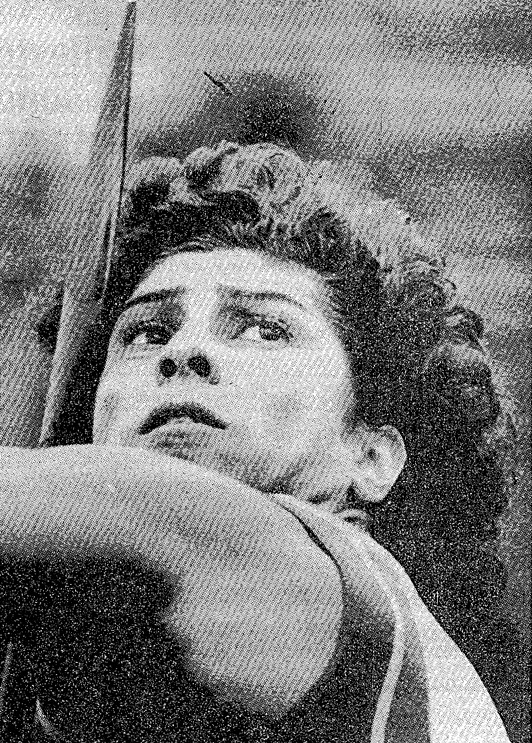
Whitbread in 1988

Having finished behind fellow British competitor Tessa Sanderson in a run of 18 competitions, Whitbread finally defeated her rival with a throw of 62.14 m (203 ft 10 1/4 in) to win the UK Athletics Championship in 1983, Whitbread won the silver medal at the inaugural World Championships in 1983, having narrowly qualified for the final. She led throughout the final until Tiina Lillak bettered her mark with her last throw of the contest. A few days before the 1984 Summer Olympics, Whitbread had a stomach operation but was still able to travel to the Games and compete. She finished in the bronze medal position, with 67.14 m (220 ft 3 1/4 in), and Sanderson (69.56 m (228 ft 2 1/2 in)) won gold. Lillak, who had a stress fracture in her right foot, won the silver medal. After the result, Whitbread commented that "I am so disappointed ... I was not right on the night."

At the 1986 Commonwealth Games in July, Whitbread broke the Games record twice during her first three throws, and led with a distance of 68.54 m (224 ft 10 1/4 in), before Sanderson achieved 69.80 m (229 ft 0 in) and won. Whitbread sat down crying on the field after the result for around 30 minutes. After the medal ceremony, she commented, while still visibly upset: "12 years of hard work. Still no [gold] medal ... I've waited two long years since [the 1984 Summer Olympics]. And now I'm humiliated." Sanderson, who had placed behind Whitbread in all of their seven post-1984 Olympics meetings before the Games, said "I don't mind losing to Fatima in the smaller competitions, but not in the big ones."

=== World record, and European and World championship wins ===
The following month, Whitbread broke the javelin world record with a throw of 77.44 m (254 ft 3/4 in) in the qualifying round of the 1986 European Championships, more than 2 m further than the record set by Petra Felke of East Germany the previous year. She was the first British athlete to set a world record in a throwing event. Felke led for the first three rounds, before Whitbread produced a throw of 72.68 m (238 ft 5 1/4 in) in the fourth round, and 73.68 m (241 ft 8 3/4 in) in the fifth round to win her first major championship gold. Whitbread later wrote that "All the years of training had finally come to something ... I went on my lap of honour ... Spontaneously, I wiggled my hips in happiness, a victory wiggle." The record was beaten by Felke in July 1987 with a throw of 79.80 m (261 ft 9 1/2 in).

Whitbread qualified for the final of the 1987 World Championships in second place behind Felke. Her throw of 76.64 m (251 ft 5 1/4 in) was, at the time, the third-longest ever, and won her the title ahead of Felke. Sanderson was fourth. Her celebratory wiggles after defeating Felke in the World and European event became well known in the UK. She was voted winner of the BBC Sports Personality of the Year award in 1987. David Powell wrote in The Times, that "To that practiced smile, she has added the 'Whitbread wiggle'. She is succeeding in bringing personality to her event in the same way that Willie Banks did to the triple jump."

=== Later career ===
In the months leading up to the 1988 Summer Olympics in Seoul, Whitbread suffered from several ailments: a shoulder injury, boils, glandular fever and problems with her gums. Whitbread won the silver medal behind Felke, with a throw that, although her best of the season, was some four metres less than her rival. Whitbread commented "If I had to be beaten, I am glad it was by Petra."

Whitbread's later career was affected by a long-term shoulder injury, which she believed dated back to her world record throw in 1986. The 1990 UK Athletics Championships was the last event that she participated in, and she sustained a further shoulder injury there. In 1992 she formally retired from competition.

=== Rivalry with Tessa Sanderson ===
Alan Hubbard wrote in a 1990 article in The Observer about Whitbread and Sanderson that "their hate-hate relationship has been one of the most enduring in British sport," lasting almost a decade. In 2009, Tom Lamont commented in The Guardian that "Whitbread and Sanderson were always uneasy rivals and the enmity that developed during their overlapping careers became as famous as their achievements, and seems to survive in their retirement." Hubbard cited Sanderson's perception that Whitbread received preferential treatment from the British Amateur Athletic Board. The Board's promotions officer, Andy Norman, who had a role in setting British athletes' fees, was a family friend of Whitbread and her mother. In 1985, Whitbread often participated in international events but Sanderson took part in only one in the season ending in June 1985. Sanderson claimed that this was because she lacked supporters in the meetings where representatives were determined; she said that "Fatima has Andy Norman looking after her in meetings ... and, of course, her mother, Margaret, is the national event coach". In 1987, Sanderson threatened to boycott six official athletics events, for which she was to be paid £1,000 each by British Athletics compared to Whitbread's £10,000. Sanderson also objected to the Whitbreads' endorsement of Howland, who competed at the 1990 Commonwealth Games after a two-year doping suspension, since Howland was Australian, and Sanderson felt they should have supported British athletes instead.

During their respective careers, Whitbread gained one world and one European title; Sanderson won an Olympic and three Commonwealth golds. In all, Sanderson placed higher in 27 of the 45 times that they faced each other in competition, although Whitbread had the better results of the pair from 1984 to 1987. In 1993, coach Peter Lawler favourably compared Whitbread's technique to Sanderson's, writing in IAAF New Studies in Athletics that "the alignments of Whitbread and [Mick] Hill are as straight as a cricket text book's bat. Whitbread perfected the turning on to the shaft while Sanderson often sagged through the delivery."

== Personal life ==
Whitbread wrote in her 2012 autobiography that she began a personal relationship with Andy Norman shortly after his divorce in 1986. In 1997, Whitbread married Norman in Copthorne, West Sussex. The couple, who had a son together, divorced in 2006. Norman died of a heart attack in 2007.

Whitbread has published two autobiographies written with Adrianne Blue, Fatima: The Autobiography of Fatima Whitbread in 1988, and Survivor: The Shocking and Inspiring Story of a True Champion in 2012.

Whitbread is a Christian but, in her own words, "not devout."

== Honours and awards ==
Whitbread was runner-up to Nigel Mansell in the 1986 BBC Sports Personality of the Year Awards, and won the title the following year. She was named the Sports Writers' Association Sportswoman of the Year in 1986 and 1987. She was appointed a Member of the Order of the British Empire (MBE) in the 1987 Birthday Honours, for services to athletics. Whitbread received the 2023 BBC Sports Personality of the Year Helen Rollason Award, for "outstanding achievement in the face of adversity". She was awarded Freedom of the Borough by the mayor of Thurrock Sue Shinnick and leader of Thurrock Council Lynn Worrall in 2025, alongside her mother Margaret.

In September 2025, Whitbread was awarded an honorary doctorate by the university of Roehampton.

== In media ==
Whitbread has been a guest on television programmes including A Question of Sport (on which she first appeared in 1984), The Little and Large Show (1987 and 1988) and The Wright Stuff (2012). In 1989, she was one of the celebrities with experience of fostering or adoption who took part in Find a Family on ITV. The series featured the celebrities' own reflections, and also highlighted specific children, inviting viewers to contact the programme if they were interesting in fostering or adopting them.

In January 1995 Whitbread was interviewed by Andrew Neil, on his one-on-one show Is This Your Life? on Channel 4 which included discussion of Cliff Temple's suicide. Writing in The Guardian, Nancy Banks-Smith described how Whitbread had "stonewalled with stoicism and without sweating" and been unclear in her answers about this. Whitbread also spoke about her unhappiness at how Ben Johnson had been treated after being found doping with steroids. Neil's treatment of Whitbread attracted viewer complaints.

She was a featured "masked celebrity" on Celebrity Wrestling in 2005, and lost her bout against Victoria Silvstedt.

In November 2011, Whitbread took part in the ITV show I'm a Celebrity ... Get Me Out of Here! Whitbread and fellow campmate Antony Cotton left on 2 December 2011, placing her third. One of the challenges on the show involved her wearing a helmet containing about 7,500 cockroaches. The segment was halted after one of the insects crawled up her nose. It was removed by flushing it out through her mouth with water.

In 2012, she was a regular fitness expert appearing on This Morning. Later that year, the stand-alone documentary Fatima Whitbread: Growing Up in Care featured Whitbread's reflections on her own troubled childhood, and her conversations with others who had experienced serious problems from their parent and problems with the UK care system. In The Guardian, David Stubbs wrote "More emotional than forensic, this is compulsory viewing nonetheless." In 2020, she trekked the Sultans Trail for BBC Two's Pilgrimage: Road to Istanbul.

In 2023, she appeared in I'm a Celebrity... South Africa, placing third again after losing the penultimate trial to camp mates Jordan Banjo and Myleene Klass.

== Career statistics ==
=== International competitions ===
The table shows Whitbread's performances representing Great Britain and England in international competitions. (q) Indicates overall position in qualifying round.

Fatima Whitbread's javelin throw record
Year	Competition	Venue	Position	Distance	Ref.
1978	Commonwealth Games	Edmonton, Canada	6th	49.16 m	
1979	European Junior Championships	Bydgoszcz, Poland	1st	58.20 m	
1980	Olympic Games	Moscow, Soviet Union	18th (q)	49.74 m	
1982	European Championships	Athens, Greece	8th	65.10 m	
1982	Commonwealth Games	Brisbane, Australia	3rd	58.86 m	
1983	World Championships	Helsinki, Finland	2nd	69.14 m	
1984	Olympic Games	Los Angeles, United States	3rd	67.14 m	
1985	IAAF World Cup	Canberra, Australia	3rd	65.12 m	
1986	Commonwealth Games	Edinburgh, United Kingdom	2nd	68.54 m	
1986	European Championships	Stuttgart, West Germany	1st	76.32 m	
1986	Grand Prix Final	Rome, Italy	2nd	69.40 m	
1987	World Championships	Rome, Italy	1st	76.64 m	
1988	Olympic Games	Seoul, South Korea	2nd	70.32 m	

=== National titles ===
- 1977 English Schools' Athletics Championships (intermediate)
- AAA Junior Championships (under 17): 1977
- 6 times AAA champion: 1981, 1982, 1983, 1984, 1986, 1987
- 8 times UK Athletics Champion: 1981, 1982, 1983, 1984, 1985, 1986, 1987, 1988

== Publications ==
- Whitbread, Fatima; Blue, Adrianne (1988). Fatima: The Autobiography of Fatima Whitbread. London: Pelham. ISBN 978-0720718560.
- Whitbread, Fatima; Blue, Adrianne (2012). Survivor: The Shocking and Inspiring Story of a True Champion. London: Virgin Books. ISBN 978-0753540961.
- Whitbread, Fatima (2024). My Bright Shining Star (words&pictures) ISBN 978-0-7112-9623-7

== Television and radio ==
Television and radio appearances by Fatima Whitbread
Year	Programme	Role	Ref
1984, 1986	A Question of Sport	guest	
1985	Cockney Darts Classic	guest	
1987, 1988	The Little and Large Show	guest	
1987	Wogan	guest	
1989	Find a Family	participant	
1995	Is This Your Life?	guest	
2005	Celebrity Wrestling	masked celebrity	
2009	Total Wipeout Celebrity Special	contestant	
2011	I'm a Celebrity ... Get Me Out of Here!	contestant	
2011	Celebrity Come Dine with Me	participant	
2011	Who Wants to Be a Millionaire? (Note: Partnered with Russell Watson.)	contestant	
2012	This Morning	fitness expert	
2012	The Wright Stuff	guest	
2012	Question of Sport	guest	
2012	Pointless Celebrities	guest	
2012	Fatima Whitbread: Growing Up in Care	herself	
2015	Eternal Glory	participant	
2017	Pointless Celebrities (Note: Sports Personality of the Year edition, partnered with Robin Cousins)	guest	
2019	Holiday of My Lifetime	guest	
2019	Pointless Celebrities (Note: 1980s edition, partnered with Robin Cousins)	guest	
2020	Pilgrimage: Road to Istanbul	participant	
2022	Celebrity SAS: Who Dares Wins	participant	
2023	I'm a Celebrity... South Africa	participant	

== Explanatory notes ==
Sporting positions
Preceded by (East Germany) Petra Felke	Women's Javelin Best Year Performance; 1984–1985	Succeeded by (East Germany) Petra Felke
