= Javelin throw at the World Athletics Championships =

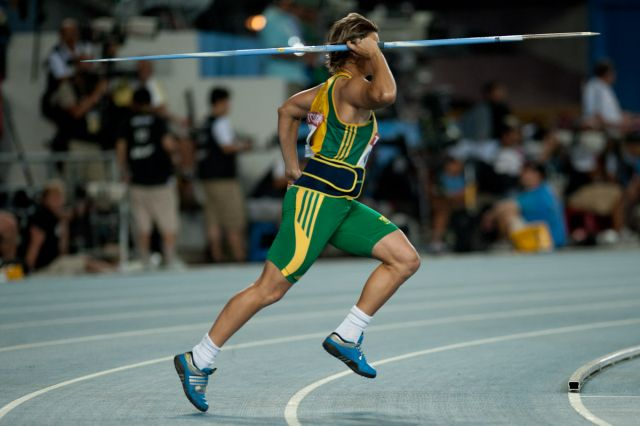
- Sunette Viljoen competing at the 2011 championships

Overview
- Gender: Men and women
- Years held: Men: 1983 – 2025; Women: 1983 – 2025

Championship record
- Men: Jan Železný 92.80 m (2001)
- Women: Osleidys Menéndez 71.70 m (2005)

Reigning champion
- Men: Keshorn Walcott (TRI)
- Women: Juleisy Angulo (ECU)

The javelin throw at the World Athletics Championships has been contested by both men and women since the inaugural edition in 1983. The competition format typically has one qualifying round contested by two groups of athletes, with all those clearing the automatic qualifying distance or placing in top twelve overall advancing to the final round.

Overall, the Czech Republic has been the most successful nation in the event, winning 7 gold medals in total and 13 medals overall. Germany has won the most medals out of any country, with 18 medals in total, including 5 golds. Norway is the only country aside from the Czech Republic and Germany to have won gold medals in both the men's and the women's event. Finland has seen significant success in the men's event, topping the men's medal table with 4 golds and 9 medals overall.

Jan Železný is the most successful and most decorated athlete in the event, having won 5 medals in total, including 3 golds. His compatriot Barbora Špotáková is the most successful female athlete, with 3 medals in total, all of them gold. Christina Obergföll and Steffi Nerius are the most decorated female athletes, with 4 medals in total.

The championship records for the event are 92.80 m for men, set by Železný in 2001, and 71.70 m for women, set by Osleidys Menéndez in 2015.

Additionally, Menéndez' championship record throw was also the only time the world record was broken at the championships.

The reigning world champions are Neeraj Chopra of India and Haruka Kitaguchi of Japan.

== Age records ==
- All information from World Athletics.

Distinction	Male			Female		
Distinction	Athlete	Age	Date	Athlete	Age	Date
Youngest champion	Marius Corbett (RSA)	21 years, 313 days	5 Aug 1997	Osleidys Menéndez (CUB)	21 years, 265 days	6 Aug 2001
Youngest medalist	Jan Železný (CZE)	21 years, 75 days	30 Aug 1987	Mikaela Ingberg (FIN)	21 years, 10 days	8 Aug 1995
Youngest finalist	Aleksandr Ivanov (RUS)	19 years, 79 days	12 Aug 2001	Osleidys Menéndez (CUB)	17 years, 268 days	9 Aug 1997
Youngest participant	Kim Jae-sang (KOR)	18 years, 340 days	29 Aug 1987	Liang Lili (CHN)	15 years 283 days	26 Aug 1999
Oldest champion	Jan Železný (CZE)	35 years, 57 days	12 Aug 2001	Steffi Nerius (GER)	37 years, 48 days	18 Aug 2009
Oldest medalist	Jan Železný (CZE)	35 years, 57 days	12 Aug 2001	Steffi Nerius (GER)	37 years, 48 days	18 Aug 2009
Oldest finalist	Peter Blank (GER)	41 years, 193 days	31 Aug 2003	Laverne Eve (BAH)	40 years, 59 days	14 Aug 2005
Oldest participant	Peter Blank (GER)	41 years, 193 days	31 Aug 2003	Laverne Eve (BAH)	42 years, 74 days	29 Aug 2007

== Medalists ==
=== Men ===
Championships	Gold	Silver	Bronze
1983 Helsinki	Detlef Michel (GDR)	Tom Petranoff (USA)	Dainis Kūla (URS)
1987 Rome	Seppo Räty (FIN)	Viktor Yevsyukov (URS)	Jan Železný (TCH)
1991 Tokyo	Kimmo Kinnunen (FIN)	Seppo Räty (FIN)	Vladimir Sasimovich (URS)
1993 Stuttgart	Jan Železný (CZE)	Kimmo Kinnunen (FIN)	Mick Hill (GBR)
1995 Gothenburg	Jan Železný (CZE)	Steve Backley (GBR)	Boris Henry (GER)
1997 Athens	Marius Corbett (RSA)	Steve Backley (GBR)	Konstadinos Gatsioudis (GRE)
1999 Seville	Aki Parviainen (FIN)	Konstadinos Gatsioudis (GRE)	Jan Železný (CZE)
2001 Edmonton	Jan Železný (CZE)	Aki Parviainen (FIN)	Konstadinos Gatsioudis (GRE)
2003 Saint-Denis	Sergey Makarov (RUS)	Andrus Värnik (EST)	Boris Henry (GER)
2005 Helsinki	Andrus Värnik (EST)	Andreas Thorkildsen (NOR)	Sergey Makarov (RUS)
2007 Osaka	Tero Pitkämäki (FIN)	Andreas Thorkildsen (NOR)	Breaux Greer (USA)
2009 Berlin	Andreas Thorkildsen (NOR)	Guillermo Martínez (CUB)	Yukifumi Murakami (JPN)
2011 Daegu	Matthias de Zordo (GER)	Andreas Thorkildsen (NOR)	Guillermo Martínez (CUB)
2013 Moscow	Vítězslav Veselý (CZE)	Tero Pitkämäki (FIN)	Dmitriy Tarabin (RUS)
2015 Beijing	Julius Yego (KEN)	Ihab Abdelrahman (EGY)	Tero Pitkämäki (FIN)
2017 London	Johannes Vetter (GER)	Jakub Vadlejch (CZE)	Petr Frydrych (CZE)
2019 Doha	Anderson Peters (GRN)	Magnus Kirt (EST)	Johannes Vetter (GER)
2022 Eugene	Anderson Peters (GRN)	Neeraj Chopra (IND)	Jakub Vadlejch (CZE)
2023 Budapest	Neeraj Chopra (IND)	Arshad Nadeem (PAK)	Jakub Vadlejch (CZE)
2025 Tokyo	Keshorn Walcott (TRI)	Anderson Peters (GRD)	Curtis Thompson (USA)

==== Medalists by country ====
Rank	Nation	Gold	Silver	Bronze	Total
1	Finland (FIN)	4	4	1	9
2	Czech Republic (CZE)	4	1	4	9
3	Grenada (GRN)	2	1	0	3
4	Germany (GER)	2	0	3	5
5	Norway (NOR)	1	3	0	4
6	Estonia (EST)	1	2	0	3
7	India (IND)	1	1	0	2
8	Russia (RUS)	1	0	2	3
9	East Germany (GDR)	1	0	0	1
9	Kenya (KEN)	1	0	0	1
9	South Africa (RSA)	1	0	0	1
9	Trinidad and Tobago (TRI)	1	0	0	1
13	Great Britain (GBR)	0	2	1	3
14	Greece (GRE)	0	1	2	3
14	Soviet Union (URS)	0	1	2	3
14	United States (USA)	0	1	2	3
17	Cuba (CUB)	0	1	1	2
18	Egypt (EGY)	0	1	0	1
18	Pakistan (PAK)	0	1	0	1
20	Czechoslovakia (TCH)	0	0	1	1
20	Japan (JPN)	0	0	1	1
Totals (21 entries)		20	20	20	60

==== Multiple medalists ====
Rank	Athlete	Nation	Period	Gold	Silver	Bronze	Total
1	Jan Železný	Czechoslovakia (TCH); Czech Republic (CZE)	1987-2001	3	0	2	5
2	Anderson Peters	Grenada (GRN)	2019-2022	2	1	0	3
3	Andreas Thorkildsen	Norway (NOR)	2005-2011	1	3	0	4
4	Tero Pitkämäki	Finland (FIN)	2007-2015	1	1	1	3
5	Seppo Räty	Finland (FIN)	1987-1991	1	1	0	2
5	Kimmo Kinnunen	Finland (FIN)	1991-1993	1	1	0	2
5	Aki Parviainen	Finland (FIN)	1999-2001	1	1	0	2
5	Andrus Värnik	Estonia (EST)	2003-2005	1	1	0	2
5	Neeraj Chopra	India (IND)	2022-2023	1	1	0	2
10	Sergey Makarov	Russia (RUS)	2003-2005	1	0	1	2
10	Johannes Vetter	Germany (GER)	2017-2019	1	0	1	2
12	Steve Backley	Great Britain (GBR)	1995-1997	0	2	0	2
13	Konstadinos Gatsioudis	Greece (GRE)	1997-2001	0	1	2	3
13	Jakub Vadlejch	Czech Republic (CZE)	2017-2023	0	1	2	3
15	Guillermo Martínez	Cuba (CUB)	2009-2011	0	1	1	2
16	Boris Henry	Germany (GER)	1995-2003	0	0	2	2

=== Women ===
Championships	Gold	Silver	Bronze
1983 Helsinki	Tiina Lillak (FIN)	Fatima Whitbread (GBR)	Anna Verouli (GRE)
1987 Rome	Fatima Whitbread (GBR)	Petra Felke-Meier (GDR)	Beate Peters (FRG)
1991 Tokyo	Xu Demei (CHN)	Petra Felke-Meier (GER)	Silke Renk (GER)
1993 Stuttgart	Trine Solberg-Hattestad (NOR)	Karen Forkel (GER)	Natalya Shikolenko (BLR)
1995 Gothenburg	Natalya Shikolenko (BLR)	Felicia Țilea-Moldovan (ROU)	Mikaela Ingberg (FIN)
1997 Athens	Trine Solberg-Hattestad (NOR)	Joanna Stone (AUS)	Tanja Damaske (GER)
1999 Seville	Mirela Manjani-Tzelili (GRE)	Tatyana Shikolenko (RUS)	Trine Solberg-Hattestad (NOR)
2001 Edmonton	Osleidys Menéndez (CUB)	Mirela Manjani-Tzelili (GRE)	Sonia Bisset (CUB)
2003 Saint-Denis	Mirela Maniani (GRE)	Tatyana Shikolenko (RUS)	Steffi Nerius (GER)
2005 Helsinki	Osleidys Menéndez (CUB)	Christina Obergföll (GER)	Steffi Nerius (GER)
2007 Osaka	Barbora Špotáková (CZE)	Christina Obergföll (GER)	Steffi Nerius (GER)
2009 Berlin	Steffi Nerius (GER)	Barbora Špotáková (CZE)	Monica Stoian (ROM)
2011 Daegu	Barbora Špotáková (CZE)	Sunette Viljoen (RSA)	Christina Obergföll (GER)
2013 Moscow	Christina Obergföll (GER)	Kim Mickle (AUS)	Mariya Abakumova (RUS)
2015 Beijing	Katharina Molitor (GER)	Lü Huihui (CHN)	Sunette Viljoen (RSA)
2017 London	Barbora Špotáková (CZE)	Li Lingwei (CHN)	Lü Huihui (CHN)
2019 Doha	Kelsey-Lee Barber (AUS)	Liu Shiying (CHN)	Lü Huihui (CHN)
2022 Eugene	Kelsey-Lee Barber (AUS)	Kara Winger (USA)	Haruka Kitaguchi (JPN)
2023 Budapest	Haruka Kitaguchi (JPN)	Flor Ruiz (COL)	Mackenzie Little (AUS)
2025 Tokyo	Juleisy Angulo (ECU)	Anete Sietiņa (LAT)	Mackenzie Little (AUS)

==== Medalists by country ====
Rank	Nation	Gold	Silver	Bronze	Total
1	Germany (GER)	3	4	6	13
2	Czech Republic (CZE)	3	1	0	4
3	Australia (AUS)	2	2	2	6
4	Greece (GRE)	2	1	1	4
5	Cuba (CUB)	2	0	1	3
5	Norway (NOR)	2	0	1	3
7	China (CHN)	1	3	2	6
8	Great Britain (GBR)	1	1	0	2
9	Belarus (BLR)	1	0	1	2
9	Finland (FIN)	1	0	1	2
9	Japan (JPN)	1	0	1	2
12	Ecuador (ECU)	1	0	0	1
13	Russia (RUS)	0	2	2	4
14	South Africa (RSA)	0	1	1	2
15	Colombia (COL)	0	1	0	1
15	East Germany (GDR)	0	1	0	1
15	Latvia (LAT)	0	1	0	1
15	Romania (ROU)	0	1	0	1
15	United States (USA)	0	1	0	1
20	West Germany (FRG)	0	0	1	1
Totals (20 entries)		20	20	20	60

==== Multiple medalists ====
Rank	Athlete	Nation	Period	Gold	Silver	Bronze	Total
1	Barbora Špotáková	Czech Republic (CZE)	2007-2017	3	0	0	3
2	Trine Solberg-Hattestad	Norway (NOR)	1993-1999	2	1	0	3
2	Mirena Maniani	Greece (GRE)	1999-2003	2	1	0	3
4	Osleidys Menéndez	Cuba (CUB)	2001-2005	2	0	0	2
4	Kelsey-Lee Barber	Australia (AUS)	2019-2022	2	0	0	2
6	Christina Obergföll	Germany (GER)	2005-2013	1	2	1	4
7	Fatima Whitbread	Great Britain (GBR)	1983-1987	1	1	0	2
8	Steffi Nerius	Germany (GER)	2003-2009	1	0	3	4
9	Natalya Shikolenko	Belarus (BLR)	1993-1995	1	0	1	2
9	Haruka Kitaguchi	Japan (JPN)	2022-2023	1	0	1	2
11	Petra Felke-Meier	East Germany (GDR); Germany (GER)	1987-1991	0	2	0	2
11	Tatyana Shikolenko	Russia (RUS)	1999-2003	0	2	0	2
13	Lü Huihui	China (CHN)	2015-2019	0	1	2	3
14	Sunette Viljoen	South Africa (RSA)	2011-2015	0	1	1	2
15	Mackenzie Little	Australia (AUS)	2023-2025	0	0	2	2

=== Combined medal table ===
Rank	Nation	Gold	Silver	Bronze	Total
1	Czech Republic (CZE)	7	2	4	13
2	Germany (GER)	5	4	9	18
3	Finland (FIN)	5	4	2	11
4	Norway (NOR)	3	3	1	7
5	Greece (GRE)	2	2	3	7
6	Australia (AUS)	2	2	2	6
7	Cuba (CUB)	2	1	2	5
8	Grenada (GRN)	2	1	0	3
9	China (CHN)	1	3	2	6
10	Great Britain (GBR)	1	3	1	5
11	Russia (RUS)	1	2	4	7
12	Estonia (EST)	1	2	0	3
13	South Africa (RSA)	1	1	1	3
14	East Germany (GDR)	1	1	0	2
14	India (IND)	1	1	0	2
16	Japan (JPN)	1	0	2	3
17	Belarus (BLR)	1	0	1	2
18	Ecuador (ECU)	1	0	0	1
18	Kenya (KEN)	1	0	0	1
18	Trinidad and Tobago (TTO)	1	0	0	1
21	United States (USA)	0	2	2	4
22	Soviet Union (URS)	0	1	2	3
23	Colombia (COL)	0	1	0	1
23	Egypt (EGY)	0	1	0	1
23	Latvia (LAT)	0	1	0	1
23	Pakistan (PAK)	0	1	0	1
23	Romania (ROU)	0	1	0	1
28	Czechoslovakia (TCH)	0	0	1	1
28	West Germany (FRG)	0	0	1	1
Totals (29 entries)		40	40	40	120

== Championship record progression ==
=== Men ===
Old model (up until 1986-06-01)
Mark	Athlete	Nation	Year	Round	Date
88.86 m	Klaus Tafelmeier	West Germany (FRG)	1983	Qualification	1983-08-10
90.40 m	Detlef Michel	East Germany (GDR)	1983	Qualification	1983-08-10

Renewed model (1986-06-01 – 1991-11-18)
Mark	Athlete	Nation	Year	Round	Date
82.10 m	Viktor Yevsyukov	Soviet Union (URS)	1987	Qualification	1987-08-29
82.20 m	Jan Železný	Czechoslovakia (TCH)	1987	Final	1987-08-30
82.32 m	Seppo Räty	Finland (FIN)	1987	Final	1987-08-30
82.52 m	Viktor Yevsyukov	Soviet Union (URS)	1987	Final	1987-08-30
83.54 m	Seppo Räty	Finland (FIN)	1987	Final	1987-08-30
90.82 m	Kimmo Kinnunen	Finland (FIN)	1991	Final	1991-08-26

Current model (1991-11-18 – present)
Mark	Athlete	Nation	Year	Round	Date
74.10 m	Colin MacKenzie	Great Britain (GBR)	1993	Qualification	1993-08-15
81.04 m	Dmitriy Polyunin	Uzbekistan (UZB)	1993	Qualification	1993-08-15
83.22 m	Jan Železný	Czech Republic (CZE)	1993	Qualification	1993-08-15
84.78 m	Kimmo Kinnunen	Finland (FIN)	1993	Final	1993-08-16
85.98 m	Jan Železný	Czech Republic (CZE)	1993	Final	1993-08-16
87.60 m	Boris Henry	Germany (GER)	1995	Final	1993-08-13
89.58 m	Jan Železný	Czech Republic (CZE)	1995	Final	1993-08-13
91.31 m	Aki Parviainen	Finland (FIN)	2001	Final	2001-08-12
92.80 m	Jan Železný	Czech Republic (CZE)	2001	Final	2001-08-12

=== Women ===
Old model (up until 1999-04-01)
Mark	Athlete	Nation	Year	Round	Date
64.80 m	Tessa Sanderson	Great Britain (GBR)	1983	Qualification	1983-08-12
68.50 m	Anna Verouli	Greece (GRE)	1983	Qualification	1983-08-12
69.16 m	Tiina Lillak	Finland (FIN)	1983	Qualification	1983-08-12
70.82 m	Tiina Lillak	Finland (FIN)	1983	Final	1983-08-13
73.16 m	Fatima Whitbread	Great Britain (GBR)	1987	Final	1987-09-06
76.64 m	Fatima Whitbread	Great Britain (GBR)	1987	Final	1987-09-06

Current model (1999-04-01 – present)
Mark	Athlete	Nation	Year	Round	Date
61.78 m	Tatyana Shikolenko	Russia (RUS)	1999	Qualification	1999-08-26
62.07 m	Osleidys Menéndez	Cuba (CUB)	1999	Qualification	1999-08-26
62.67 m	Trine Solberg-Hattestad	Norway (NOR)	1999	Qualification	1999-08-26
63.83 m	Oksana Ovchinnikova	Russia (RUS)	1999	Qualification	1999-08-26
64.61 m	Osleidys Menéndez	Cuba (CUB)	1999	Final	1999-08-28
66.06 m	Trine Solberg-Hattestad	Norway (NOR)	1999	Final	1999-08-28
66.33 m	Mirela Tzelili	Greece (GRE)	1999	Final	1999-08-28
67.09 m	Mirela Tzelili	Greece (GRE)	1999	Final	1999-08-28
69.53 m	Osleidys Menéndez	Cuba (CUB)	2001	Final	2001-08-06
71.70 m WR	Osleidys Menéndez	Cuba (CUB)	2005	Final	2005-08-14
~~71.99 m~~^{1}	~~Maria Abakumova~~	~~Russia (RUS)~~	~~2011~~	~~Final~~	~~2011-09-02~~

^{1}Subsequently disqualified after failing a doping test.

== Best performances ==
=== Top ten furthest World Championship throws^{1} ===
Furthest men's throws at the World Championships (current model)
Rank	Distance (m)	Athlete	Nation	Year	Date
1	92.80 m	Jan Železný	Czech Republic	2001	2001-08-12
2	92.72 m	Julius Yego	Kenya	2015	2015-08-26
3	91.31 m	Aki Parviainen	Finland	2001	2001-08-12
4	91.20 m	Johannes Vetter	Germany	2017^{Q}	2017-08-10
5	90.76 m	Jan Železný	Czech Republic	2001^{Q}	2001-08-10
6	90.54 m	Anderson Peters	Grenada	2022	2022-07-23
7	90.33 m	Tero Pitkämäki	Finland	2007	2007-09-02
8	89.91 m	Anderson Peters	Grenada	2022^{Q}	2022-07-21
9	89.89 m	Johannes Vetter	Germany	2017	2017-08-12
10	89.73 m	Jakub Vadlejch	Czech Republic	2017	2017-08-12

Furthest women's throws at the World Championships (current model)
Rank	Distance (m)	Athlete	Nation	Year	Date
1	71.70 m	Osleidys Menéndez	Cuba	2005	2005-08-14
2	71.58 m	Barbora Špotáková	Czech Republic	2011	2011-09-02
3	70.03 m	Christina Obergföll	Germany	2005	2005-08-14
4	69.53 m	Osleidys Menéndez	Cuba	2001	2001-08-06
5	69.09 m	Mariya Abakumova	Russia	2013^{Q}	2013-08-16
6	69.05 m	Christina Obergföll	Germany	2013	2013-08-18
7	68.76 m	Christina Obergföll	Germany	2011^{Q}	2011-09-01
8	68.38 m	Sunette Viljoen	South Africa	2011	2011-09-02
9	67.69 m	Katharina Molitor	Germany	2015	2015-08-30
10	67.59 m	Lü Huihui	China	2017	2017-08-06

^{1}Does not include ancillary marks

== See also ==
- Javelin throw
- Javelin throw at the Olympics

== Bibliography ==
- Butler, Mark (2023). World Athletics Championships Budapest 2023 Statistics Book. World Athletics.
