= Athletics at the 2000 Summer Olympics – Women's javelin throw =

Women's javelin throw at the Games of the XXVII Olympiad
- Pictogram for athletics
- Venue: Stadium Australia
- Date: 29 September 2000 (qualifications); 30 September 2000 (finals)
- Competitors: 35 from 28 nations
- Winning distance: 68.91 OR

Medalists
1st place, gold medalist(s)		Trine Hattestad; Norway
2nd place, silver medalist(s)		Mirela Manjani-Tzelili; Greece
3rd place, bronze medalist(s)		Osleidys Menéndez; Cuba

The Women's Javelin Throw event at the 2000 Summer Olympics as part of the athletics program went held at the Olympic Stadium on Friday, 29 September and Saturday, 30 September.

The qualifying athletes progressed through to the final where the qualifying distances are scrapped and they start afresh with up to six throws. The qualifying distance was 61.50 metres. For all qualifiers who did not achieve the standard, the remaining spaces in the final were filled by the longest throws until a total of 12 qualifiers.

== Medalists ==
Gold	Trine Hattestad; Norway
Silver	Mirella Maniani-Tzelili; Greece
Bronze	Osleidys Menéndez; Cuba

== Schedule ==
- All times are Australian Eastern Standard Time (UTC+10)

Qualification Round
Group A	Group B
29.09.2000 – 10:00h	29.09.2000 – 11:45h
Final Round
30.09.2000 – 20:00h

== Abbreviations ==
Q	automatic qualification
q	qualification by rank
DNS	did not start
NM	no mark
WR	world record
OR	olympic record
AR	area record
NR	national record
PB	personal best
SB	season best

== Records ==
Standing records prior to the 2000 Summer Olympics
World Record	Trine Hattestad (NOR)	69.41 m	28 July 2000	Oslo, Norway
Olympic Record	New javelin was introduced officially from 01.04.1999			
Broken records during the 2000 Summer Olympics
Olympic Record	Osleidys Menéndez (CUB)	67.34 m	29 September 2000	Sydney, Australia
Olympic Record	Trine Hattestad (NOR)	68.91 m	30 September 2000	Sydney, Australia

== Qualification ==
=== Group A ===
Rank	Overall	Athlete	Country	Attempts			Distance	Note
Rank	Overall	Athlete	Country	1	2	3	Distance	Note
1	2	Steffi Nerius	Germany	65.76	—	—	65.76 m	PB
2	3	Trine Hattestad	Norway	65.44	—	—	65.44 m	
3	4	Mirella Maniani-Tzelili	Greece	63.34	—	—	63.34 m	
4	7	Mikaela Ingberg	Finland	58.94	60.85	X	60.85 m	
5	9	Li Lei	China	57.01	X	60.57	60.57 m	
6	11	Sonia Bisset	Cuba	59.13	X	60.09	60.09 m	
7	13	Rita Ramanauskaitė	Lithuania	57.81	X	59.21	59.21 m	
8	14	Nikolett Szabó	Hungary	58.86	55.95	56.72	58.86 m	
9	22	Ana Mirela Țermure	Romania	55.67	56.31	53.86	56.31 m	
10	24	Yekaterina Ivakina	Russia	55.30	52.43	55.58	55.58 m	
11	26	Lynda Blutreich	United States	X	52.77	55.25	55.25 m	
12	27	Evfemija Štorga	Slovenia	X	54.94	52.97	54.94 m	
13	28	Khristina Georgieva	Bulgaria	54.60	51.10	53.31	54.60 m	
14	29	Nadine Auzeil	France	51.02	53.85	49.90	53.85 m	
15	30	Inga Kožarenoka	Latvia	53.83	X	X	53.83 m	
16	31	Louise Currey	Australia	53.32	X	—	53.32 m	
17	32	Gurmeet Kaur	India	52.78	48.80	46.46	52.78 m	
18	35	Tatyana Sudarikova	Kyrgyzstan	47.56	X	48.33	48.33 m	

=== Group B ===
Rank	Overall	Athlete	Country	Attempts			Distance	Note
Rank	Overall	Athlete	Country	1	2	3	Distance	Note
1	1	Osleidys Menéndez	Cuba	67.34	—	—	67.34 m	AR
2	5	Xiomara Rivero	Cuba	61.89	—	—	61.89 m	SB
3	6	Tatyana Shikolenko	Russia	61.54	—	—	61.54 m	
4	8	Wei Jianhua	China	60.64	X	57.19	60.64 m	
5	10	Claudia Coslovich	Italy	60.12	X	57.05	60.12 m	
6	12	Nikola Tomečková	Czech Republic	59.49	55.40	59.40	59.49 m	
7	15	Felicia Țilea-Moldovan	Romania	54.11	58.75	X	58.75 m	
8	16	Laverne Eve	Bahamas	X	57.98	58.36	58.36 m	
9	17	Joanna Stone	Australia	53.34	57.57	58.34	58.34 m	
10	18	Aggeliki Tsiolakoudi	Greece	X	58.11	X	58.11 m	
11	19	Tetyana Lyakhovych	Ukraine	55.81	53.33	57.41	57.41 m	
12	20	Taina Uppa	Finland	57.39	X	X	57.39 m	
13	21	Olivia McKoy	Jamaica	55.98	52.83	56.36	56.36 m	
14	23	Sueli dos Santos	Brazil	X	56.27	50.50	56.27 m	
15	25	Marta Míguez	Spain	55.52	55.01	X	55.52 m	
16	33	Lee Young-Sun	South Korea	49.84	X	X	49.84 m	
17	34	Sabina Moya	Colombia	41.22	49.16	47.37	49.16 m	

== Final ==
Rank	Athlete	Attempts						Distance	Note
Rank	Athlete	1	2	3	4	5	6	Distance	Note
1st place, gold medalist(s)	Trine Hattestad (NOR)	68.91	62.27	X	64.38	66.22	64.09	68.91 m	OR
2nd place, silver medalist(s)	Mirela Maniani-Tzelili (GRE)	X	65.56	67.51	61.96	65.34	67.51	67.51 m	NR
3rd place, bronze medalist(s)	Osleidys Menéndez (CUB)	66.03	64.99	65.17	63.95	62.47	66.18	66.18 m	
4	Steffi Nerius (GER)	61.99	61.41	64.84	57.88	61.11	61.02	64.84 m	
5	Sonia Bisset (CUB)	63.26	62.77	X	X	62.85	63.11	63.26 m	
6	Xiomara Rivero (CUB)	62.10	62.92	X	60.20	X	X	62.92 m	PB
7	Tatyana Shikolenko (RUS)	58.28	62.91	61.54	X	X	61.97	62.91 m	
8	Nikola Tomečková (CZE)	58.13	55.86	58.69	56.12	61.30	62.10	62.10 m	
9	Mikaela Ingberg (FIN)	58.10	55.97	58.56				58.56 m	
10	Wei Jianhua (CHN)	54.06	58.23	58.33				58.33 m	
11	Li Lei (CHN)	X	X	56.83				56.83 m	
12	Claudia Coslovich (ITA)	56.46	54.28	56.74				56.74 m	

== See also ==
- 1999 World Championships in Athletics – Women's javelin throw
- 2001 World Championships in Athletics – Women's javelin throw
