= Athletics at the 1999 Summer Universiade – Women's javelin throw =

The women's javelin throw event at the 1999 Summer Universiade was held on 11 July at the Estadio Son Moix in Palma de Mallorca, Spain. It was the first time the new model javelin was used for this event.

== Results ==
| Rank | Athlete | Nationality | #1 | #2 | #3 | #4 | #5 | #6 | Result | Notes |
|---|---|---|---|---|---|---|---|---|---|---|
| 1st place, gold medalist(s) | Ewa Rybak | Poland | x | 56.23 | 54.64 | 59.07 | 60.76 | x | 60.76 | UR, PB |
| 2nd place, silver medalist(s) | Evfemija Štorga | Slovenia | | | | | | | 59.30 | PB |
| 3rd place, bronze medalist(s) | Yanuris La Montaña | Cuba | | | | | | | 59.08 | |
| 4 | Steffi Nerius | Germany | | | | | | | 58.76 | |
| 5 | Oksana Velichko | Belarus | | | | | | | 57.82 | |
| 6 | Claudia Coslovich | Italy | | | | | | | 56.50 | |
| 7 | Ana Mirela Țermure | Romania | | | | | | | 56.40 | |
| 8 | María Caridad Colón | Cuba | | | | | | | 56.14 | |
| 9 | Sarah Walter | France | | | | | | | 55.65 | |
| 10 | Ann Crouse | United States | | | | | | | 53.79 | |
| 11 | Cassi Morelock | United States | | | | | | | 50.07 | |
| 12 | Liza Randjelovic | Slovenia | | | | | | | 48.24 | |
| 13 | Paula Palma | Chile | | | | | | | 41.38 | |
| | Janet Odu | Nigeria | | | | | | | DNS | |
