= Athletics at the 1997 Summer Universiade – Women's javelin throw =

The women's javelin throw event at the 1997 Summer Universiade was held at the Stadio Cibali in Catania, Italy on 30 August. This was the last edition to feature the old model of javelin.

== Results ==
Rank	Athlete	Nationality	Result	Notes
1st place, gold medalist(s)	Isel López	Cuba	64.30	
2nd place, silver medalist(s)	Sonia Bisset	Cuba	63.46	
3rd place, bronze medalist(s)	Karen Forkel	Germany	60.70	
4	Ewa Rybak	Poland	60.28	
5	Steffi Nerius	Germany	59.80	
6	Claudia Isăilă	Romania	59.16	
7	Lee Young-Sun	South Korea	57.22	
8	Claudia Coslovich	Italy	56.44	
9	Sarah Walter	France	52.12	
10	Alessandra Resende	Brazil	51.64	
11	Tiffany Hogan	United States	50.70	
12	Eufemija Štorga	Slovenia	50.62	
13	Ruth Pôldots	Estonia	48.62	
14	Emily Carlsten	United States	45.60	
15	Johanna Neumbo	Namibia	44.24	
16	Francesca Gasco	Peru	38.86	
