= Tatyana Shikolenko =

Russian track and field athlete

Personal information
- Born: 10 May 1968 (age 58) Krasnodar, Soviet Union

Sport
- Sport: Track and field
Medal record
Representing Soviet Union
Summer Universiade
Gold medal – first place	1991 Sheffield	Javelin throw
Representing Russia
World Championships
Silver medal – second place	1999 Seville	Javelin throw
Silver medal – second place	2003 Paris	Javelin throw
European Championships
Silver medal – second place	1998 Budapest	Javelin throw

Tatyana Ivanovna Shikolenko (Russian: Татьяна Ивановна Шиколенко; born 10 May 1968) is a retired Russian track and field athlete who competed in the javelin throw. During her career, she won two silver medals at the World Championships. Her personal best throw of 67.20 metres was achieved in 2000. She battled primarily with Mirela Manjani, who captured the gold medal on both occasions Shikolenko finished second.

After the dissolution of the Soviet Union, Tatyana Shikolenko represented Belarus for a while until switching nationality to her birth country Russia in 1996. Her sister Natalya also achieved distinction in javelin throwing; she however remained a Belarusian citizen.

== International competitions ==
Year	Competition	Venue	Position	Event	Result	Notes
Representing the Soviet Union
1986	World Junior Championships	Athens, Greece	4th	Javelin throw	55.70 m	
1990	Goodwill Games	Seattle, United States	2nd	Javelin throw	59.06 m	
1991	Universiade	Sheffield, United Kingdom	1st	Javelin throw	63.56 m	
Representing Belarus
1993	World Championships	Stuttgart, Germany	4th	Javelin throw	65.18 m	
Representing Russia
1997	World Championships	Athens, Greece	8th	Javelin throw	63.76 m	
1998	European Championships	Budapest, Hungary	2nd	Javelin throw	66.92 m	
1999	World Championships	Seville, Spain	2nd	Javelin throw	66.37 m	
2000	Summer Olympics	Sydney, Australia	7th	Javelin throw	62.91 m	
2000	Grand Prix Final	Doha, Qatar	4th	Javelin throw	63.06 m	
2001	World Championships	Edmonton, Canada	9th	Javelin throw	60.91 m	
2002	European Championships	Munich, Germany	4th	Javelin throw	63.24 m	
2002	Grand Prix Final	Paris, France	3rd	Javelin throw	62.25 m	
2003	World Championships	Paris, France	2nd	Javelin throw	63.28 m	
2003	World Athletics Final	Athens, Greece	1st	Javelin throw	64.47 m	

== See also ==
- List of nationality transfers in athletics
- List of World Athletics Championships medalists (women)
- List of Belarus-related topics
