= Athletics at the 1991 European Youth Olympic Days =

- Host city: Brussels, Belgium
- Date: 1991
- Nations: 50
- Events: 26

The athletics competition at the 1991 European Youth Olympic Days was held from 18 to 20 July. The events took place in Brussels, Belgium. Boys and girls born 1976 or 1977 or later participated 24 track and field events, divided equally between the sexes with the exception of 2000 metres steeplechase and pole vault for boys but not girls.

== Medal summary ==
=== Men ===
Event	Gold		Silver		Bronze	
100 metres	Michael Nartey (GBR)	10.71	Henri Ondziel (FRA)	10.96	Francisco Fidalgo (ESP)	11.05
200 metres	Piotr Tymko (POL)	21.97	Richard Braibant (BEL)	22.10	Luis Acosta (ESP)	22.21
400 metres	Allyn Condon (GBR)	48.20	Rikard Rasmusson (SWE)	48.62	Emiliano Neroni (ITA)	48.65
800 metres	Igor Tolokonikov (URS)	1:52.61	Zsombor Filep (ROU)	1:52.87	Kostas Kossaros (GRE)	1:54.40
1500 metres	Massimo Pegoretti (ITA)	3:55.77	Rob Scanlon (GBR)	3:54.79	Ilídio Silva (POR)	3:54.89
110 metres hurdles^{[nb]}	Mark Hoogendoorn (NED)	14.52	Pantelis Kandelis (GRE)	14.60	Fabien Rase (BEL)	14.74
2000 metres steeplechase	Stefano Ciallella (ITA)	5:48.73	Stanislav Lambev (BUL)	5:51.93	Julio Durán (ESP)	5:55.52
4 × 100 m relay	Great Britain (GBR)	41.86	France (FRA); Henri Ondziel	41.86	Spain (ESP)	42.27
High jump	Sergey Klyugin (URS)	2.20 m	Giorgio Florindi (ITA)	2.10 m	Mark Smith (GBR)	2.07 m
Pole vault	Christian North (GBR)	4.80 m	Nicklas Östling (SWE)	4.75 m	Thomas Constantin (FRA)	4.70 m
Long jump	Yassin Guellet (BEL)	7.56 m	Justin Nkoumazok (FRA)	7.31 m	Paolo Camossi (ITA)	7.23 m
Shot put	Yuriy Bilonoh (URS)	19.45 m	Kiril Valchanov (BUL)	18.05 m	Ilias Louka (CYP)	17.78 m
Javelin throw	Gaëtan Siakinou-Schmidt (FRA)	73.56 m	Mats Nilsson (SWE)	65.90 m	Matei Dragnev (BUL)	64.20 m

- ^{[nb]} The boys hurdles were contested over hurdles at the junior height of three feet and three inches (99 cm), as opposed to the standard three feet (91.4 cm) for youth competitions.

=== Women ===
Event	Gold		Silver		Bronze	
100 metres	Sophia Smith (GBR)	11.85	Fiona Kelly (IRL)	12.07	Delphine Combe (FRA)	12.07
200 metres	Marie Joëlle Dogbo (FRA)	24.32	Ewa Charska (POL)	24.54	Natasha Bartlett (GBR)	24.85
400 metres	Maria Magdalena Nedelcu (ROU)	52.79	Jorien Kranendjik (NED)	55.04	Sandra Stals (BEL)	55.31
800 metres	Mariana Florea (ROU)	2:08.33	Arlene Smith (IRL)	2:09.00	Sylvia Kruijer (NED)	2:11.45
1500 metres	Gabriela Szabo (ROU)	4:20.73	Jeina Mitchell (GBR)	4:21.88	Rocío Martínez (ESP)	4:25.12
100 metres hurdles	Aneta Bednarczyk (POL)	13.81	Sophie Marrot (FRA)	13.81	Jane Hale (GBR)	13.95
4 × 100 m relay	France (FRA); Delphine Combe; Marie Joëlle Dogbo	46.38	Great Britain (GBR)	47.28	Poland (POL)	47.65
High jump	Yelena Razmyslovich (URS)	1.88 m	Venelina Veneva (BUL)	1.84 m	Sabrina De Leeuw (BEL)	1.76 m
Long jump	Aneta Sadach (POL)	6.06 m	Claire Ingerton (IRL)	5.97 m	Verena Mitteruzner (ITA)	5.96 m
Shot put	Corrie de Bruin (NED)	17.83 m	Irina Korzhanenko (URS)	16.68 m	Veerle Blondeel (BEL)	15.89 m
Javelin throw	Tatyana Shlupkina (URS)	50.42 m	Kirsty Morrison (GBR)	48.34 m	Miréla Manjani (ALB)	47.36 m
