= 1998 European Athletics Championships – Women's javelin throw =

Women's javelin throw at the European Athletics Championships

The Women's javelin throw event at the 1998 European Championships was held on Wednesday August 19, 1998, in Budapest, Hungary. There were a total number of 20 participating athletes. The qualification round was staged on Tuesday August 18, with the mark set at 61.00 metres. All results were made with a rough surfaced javelin (old design).

== Medalists ==
Gold	Tanja Damaske; Germany (GER)
Silver	Tatyana Shikolenko; Russia (RUS)
Bronze	Mikaela Ingberg; Finland (FIN)

== Schedule ==
- All times are Central European Time (UTC+1)

Qualification Round
Group A	Group B
18.08.1998 – 10:00h	18.08.1998 – 11:40h
Final Round
19.08.1998 – 18:00h

== Abbreviations ==
- All results shown are in metres

Q	automatic qualification
q	qualification by rank
DNS	did not start
NM	no mark
WR	world record
AR	area record
NR	national record
PB	personal best
SB	season best

== Records ==
Standing records prior to the 1998 European Athletics Championships
World Record	Petra Felke (GDR)	80.00 m	September 9, 1988	Potsdam, East Germany
Event Record	Fatima Whitbread (GBR)	77.44 m	August 28, 1986	Stuttgart, West Germany

== Qualification ==
=== Group A ===
Rank	Overall	Athlete	Attempts			Distance
Rank	Overall	Athlete	1	2	3	Distance
1	3	Mikaela Ingberg (FIN)	64.49			64.49 m
2	4	Trine Hattestad (NOR)	62.55			62.55 m
3	5	Tatyana Shikolenko (RUS)	62.01			62.01 m
4	8	Nikolett Szabó (HUN)				60.64 m
5	10	Ewa Rybak (POL)				60.34 m
6	11	Rita Ramanauskaitė (LTU)				60.26 m
7	14	Taina Uppa (FIN)				58.01 m
8	16	Dorte Barby (GER)				57.12 m
9	19	Nadine Auzeil (FRA)				52.21 m
—	—	Aysel Taş (TUR)				NM

=== Group B ===
Rank	Overall	Athlete	Attempts			Distance
Rank	Overall	Athlete	1	2	3	Distance
1	1	Steffi Nerius (GER)	60.66	66.04		66.04 m
2	2	Mirela Manjani-Tzelili (GRE)	60.53	65.14		65.14 m
3	6	Felicia Ţilea-Moldovan (ROM)	61.96			61.96 m
4	7	Heli Rantanen (FIN)				60.90 m
5	9	Tanja Damaske (GER)		60.63		60.63 m
6	12	Claudia Coslovich (ITA)	x	57.31	59.85	59.85 m
7	13	Nikola Tomečková (CZE)				59.65 m
8	15	Nadiya Kobrin (UKR)				57.70 m
9	17	Agnes Preisinger (HUN)				55.92 m
10	18	Evfemija Štorga (SLO)				53.73 m

== Final ==
Rank	Athlete	Attempts						Distance	Note
Rank	Athlete	1	2	3	4	5	6	Distance	Note
1st place, gold medalist(s)	Tanja Damaske (GER)	69.10	X	62.24	—	X	64.51	69.10 m	
2nd place, silver medalist(s)	Tatyana Shikolenko (RUS)	65.66	58.33	64.04	61.10	63.93	66.92	66.92 m	
3rd place, bronze medalist(s)	Mikaela Ingberg (FIN)	58.77	62.32	64.92	X	63.10	X	64.92 m	
4	Trine Hattestad (NOR)	63.16	X	X	X	61.06	62.77	63.16 m	
5	Heli Rantanen (FIN)	57.38	62.34	61.90	61.55	—	X	62.34 m	
6	Steffi Nerius (GER)	60.53	X	62.08	60.01	X	X	62.08 m	
7	Claudia Coslovich (ITA)	60.73	58.33	X	55.77	X	X	60.73 m	
8	Nikolett Szabó (HUN)	58.95	X	59.05	X	59.76	60.56	60.56 m	
9	Mirela Manjani-Tzelili (GRE)	58.65	56.53	56.13				58.65 m	
10	Felicia Ţilea-Moldovan (ROM)	58.30	X	X				58.30 m	
11	Rita Ramanauskaitė (LTU)	55.53	55.32	57.11				57.11 m	
12	Ewa Rybak (POL)	56.65	53.08	X				56.65 m	

== See also ==
- 1996 Women's Olympic Javelin Throw (Atlanta)
- 1997 Women's World Championships Javelin Throw (Athens)
- 1999 Women's World Championships Javelin Throw (Seville)
- 2000 Women's Olympic Javelin Throw (Sydney)
