= 1994 World Junior Championships in Athletics – Women's javelin throw =

The women's javelin throw event at the 1994 World Junior Championships in Athletics was held in Lisbon, Portugal, at Estádio Universitário de Lisboa on 20 and 22 July. An old specification 600g javelin was used.

== Medalists ==
Gold	Taina Uppa; Finland
Silver	María De La Caridad Álvarez; Cuba
Bronze	Reka Kovács; Hungary

== Results ==
=== Final ===
22 July

Rank	Name	Nationality	Attempts						Result	Notes
Rank	Name	Nationality	1	2	3	4	5	6	Result	Notes
1st place, gold medalist(s)	Taina Uppa	Finland	55.34	x	53.28	57.12	59.02	54.40	59.02	
2nd place, silver medalist(s)	María De La Caridad Álvarez	Cuba	57.22	55.92	58.26	55.02	55.46	54.92	58.26	
3rd place, bronze medalist(s)	Reka Kovács	Hungary	53.66	52.58	51.72	47.18	55.88	54.64	55.88	
4	Odaliz Palma	Cuba	55.74	x	x	x	52.60	52.04	55.74	
5	Christina Scherwin	Denmark	44.64	51.36	54.36	x	x	55.70	55.70	
6	Wang Yang	China	49.84	51.92	53.26	46.70	50.84	49.72	53.26	
7	Angelikí Tsiolakoúdi	Greece	52.00	53.16	51.46	x	46.22	45.54	53.16	
8	Miréla Manjani	Albania	52.22	49.22	48.84	49.92	47.98	x	52.22	
9	Shinobu Deguchi	Japan	x	51.70	48.46				51.70	
10	Anna Stropolo	Italy	47.50	47.86	51.02				51.02	
11	Dörte Patzschke	Germany	45.22	x	49.00				49.00	
12	Katalin Antál	Hungary	46.56	46.36	x				46.56	

=== Qualifications ===
20 Jul

==== Group A ====
Rank	Name	Nationality	Attempts			Result	Notes
Rank	Name	Nationality	1	2	3	Result	Notes
1	Katalin Antál	Hungary	52.84	54.64	-	54.64	Q
2	Miréla Manjani	Albania	49.10	53.38	-	53.38	Q
3	Angelikí Tsiolakoúdi	Greece	46.48	49.48	53.26	53.26	Q
4	Anna Stropolo	Italy	52.70	52.10	49.98	52.70	q
5	Wang Yang	China	49.98	50.68	48.98	50.68	q
6	Odaliz Palma	Cuba	50.24	49.26	x	50.24	q
7	Nancy Rahmsdorf	Germany	x	x	48.54	48.54	
8	Alina Serdyuk	Belarus	42.28	x	47.92	47.92	
9	Maka Obolashvili	Georgia	x	12.94	47.62	47.62	
10	Kirsty Morrison	United Kingdom	46.18	x	47.30	47.30	
11	Bina Ramesh	France	47.30	42.96	45.56	47.30	
12	Marie-Antoinette Marchal	Burkina Faso	36.20	37.16	x	37.16	
13	Sabina Moya	Colombia	x	36.78	34.00	36.78	
	Constanta Iancu	Romania	x	x	x	NM	

==== Group B ====
Rank	Name	Nationality	Attempts			Result	Notes
Rank	Name	Nationality	1	2	3	Result	Notes
1	Taina Uppa	Finland	55.74	-	-	55.74	Q
2	María De La Caridad Álvarez	Cuba	54.10	-	-	54.10	Q
3	Reka Kovács	Hungary	50.84	51.06	52.08	52.08	q
4	Dörte Patzschke	Germany	47.28	51.18	x	51.18	q
5	Christina Scherwin	Denmark	47.64	48.22	50.14	50.14	q
6	Shinobu Deguchi	Japan	49.90	49.82	45.72	49.90	q
7	Lucy Burrell	United Kingdom	48.74	49.60	47.68	49.60	
8	Zhao Guiyan	China	x	48.50	32.62	48.50	
9	Monique Wylie	Australia	45.36	43.54	47.28	47.28	
10	Francesca Binet	France	46.96	x	x	46.96	
11	Ruth Pöldots	Estonia	42.72	42.70	46.64	46.64	
12	Zuleima Araméndiz	Colombia	46.24	x	45.10	46.24	
13	Mateja Bezjak	Slovenia	44.64	43.82	44.10	44.64	
14	Kim Hyun-Ju	South Korea	x	x	41.88	41.88	
15	Laila Bergskas	Norway	33.12	35.86	41.62	41.62	
16	Tiffany Lott	United States	x	35.18	28.50	35.18	

== Participation ==
According to an unofficial count, 30 athletes from 23 countries participated in the event.

- Albania (1)
- Australia (1)
- Belarus (1)
- Burkina Faso (1)
- China (2)
- Colombia (2)
- Cuba (2)
- Denmark (1)
- Estonia (1)
- Finland (1)
- France (2)
- Georgia (1)
- Germany (2)
- Greece (1)
- Hungary (2)
- Italy (1)
- Japan (1)
- Norway (1)
- Romania (1)
- Slovenia (1)
- South Korea (1)
- United Kingdom (2)
- United States (1)
