= Kirsty Morrison =

British javelin thrower (born 1975)

Personal information
- Nationality: British (English)
- Born: 28 October 1975 (age 50)

Sport
- Sport: Athletics
- Event: javelin throw
- Club: Medway AC
Medal record
Athletics
Representing England
Commonwealth Games
Bronze medal – third place	1998 Kuala Lumpur	Javelin throw

Kirsty Morrison (born 28 October 1975) is a British former track and field athlete who competed in the javelin throw.

== Biography ==
Morrison's greatest achievement was representing England at the 1998 Commonwealth Games in Kuala Lumpur, Malaysia and winning a bronze medal.

Morrison became the British javelin throw champion after winning the British AAA Championships title at the 1999 AAA Championships. She also ranked third at the 1993 UK Athletics Championships. She achieved a lifetime best of 55.91 m (183 ft 5 in) in 1999.

Among her first international medals was a silver behind Soviet athlete Tatyana Shlupkina at the 1991 European Youth Olympic Days. She was a silver medallist at the 1993 European Athletics Junior Championships behind Finland's Mikaela Ingberg. She was only the second British woman to reach the javelin podium at that event, after 1979 winner Fatima Whitbread. She entered the World Junior Championships in 1994, but did not make the final there. Her fourth place finish at the 1997 European Athletics U23 Championships was a new high for a British woman at that competition.

Among other domestic competitions, she was the 2001 Inter-Counties Championships champion, four-time winner at the South of England Championships (1997, 1998, 2002, 2004), 1992 winner for England at the British Schools International Match, six-time winner at the AAA Junior Championships (1989–94), and a five-time winner at the English Schools' Athletics Championships (1990–94).

She stopped competed after 2012.

== International competitions ==
Year	Competition	Venue	Position	Event	Notes
1991	European Youth Olympic Days	Brussels, Belgium	2nd	Javelin throw	48.34 m
1993	European Junior Championships	San Sebastián, Spain	2nd	Javelin throw	55.92 m
1994	World Junior Championships	Lisbon, Portugal	18th (q)	Javelin throw	47.30 m
1997	European U23 Championships	Turku, Finland	4th	Javelin throw	54.14 m
1998	Commonwealth Games	Kuala Lumpur, Malaysia	3rd	Javelin throw	56.34 m

== National titles ==
- AAA Championships
  - Javelin throw: 1999

== See also ==
- List of Commonwealth Games medallists in athletics (women)
