= Ana Mirela Țermure =

Romanian javelin thrower

Personal information
- Born: 13 January 1975 (age 51) Căianu Mic, Bistrița-Năsăud County, Romania

Sport
- Sport: Track and field

Ana Mirela Țermure (born 13 January 1975) is a retired javelin thrower from Romania. Termure's personal best was 65.08 metres in Bucharest on June 10, 2001.

She tested positive for norandrosterone at the 2001 IAAF World Championships and received a two-year doping ban.

== International competitions ==
| Year | Competition | Venue | Position | Notes |
Representing Romania
| 1999 | Universiade | Palma de Mallorca, Spain | 7th | 56.40 m |
| 1999 | World Championships | Seville, Spain | 15th (q) | 58.52 m |
| 2000 | Olympic Games | Sydney, Australia | 22nd (q) | 56.31 m |
| 2001 | Jeux de la Francophonie | Ottawa, Canada | 2nd | 57.25 m |
| 2001 | World Championships | Edmonton, Canada | 19th (q) | 52.65 m |
| 2003 | World Championships | Paris, France | 13th (q) | 58.50 m |
