= Tatyana Sudarikova =

Kyrgyzstani javelin thrower

Tatyana (Tatiana) Sudarikova (born May 28, 1973) is a female javelin thrower from Russia, who competed for Kyrgyzstan at the 2000 Summer Olympics in Sydney, Australia. She set her personal best (62.48 metres) in 1993 in Dzerzhinsk. Following from the Olympics she married and moved to Sydney, where she currently resides. Sudarikova is an active participant in Masters Athletics. She is the current Australian W35 record holder for 56LB (4.30m) and 100LB (2.22m) weight throw.

== Competition record ==
Year	Competition	Venue	Position	Event	Notes
Representing the Commonwealth of Independent States
1992	World Junior Championships	Seoul, South Korea	12th	Javelin throw	51.90 m
Representing Kyrgyzstan
2000	Asian Championships	Jakarta, Indonesia	7th	Shot put	12.31 m
2000	Asian Championships	Jakarta, Indonesia	7th	Javelin throw	47.45 m
2000	Olympic Games	Sydney, Australia	35th (q)	Javelin throw	48.33 m
