= Evfemija Štorga =

Slovenian javelin thrower

Personal information
- Born: October 7, 1975 (age 51) Medvode, Yugoslavia

Sport
- Sport: Track and field
Medal record
Representing Slovenia
Summer Universiade
Silver medal – second place	1999 Palma de Mallorca	Javelin throw

Evfemija Štorga (born October 7, 1975) is a retired female javelin thrower from Slovenia. She set her personal best (61.14 metres) in 2000.

== Achievements ==
Year	Competition	Venue	Position	Notes
Representing Slovenia
1997	European U23 Championships	Turku, Finland	5th	53.36 m
1998	European Championships	Budapest, Hungary	18th (q)	53.73 m
1999	Universiade	Palma de Mallorca, Spain	2nd	59.30 m
1999	World Championships	Seville, Spain	24th (q)	53.54 m
2000	Olympic Games	Sydney, Australia	27th (q)	54.94 m
