= Xiomara Rivero =

Cuban javelin thrower

Personal information
- Born: 24 December 1968 (age 57) Guane, Pinar del Río, Cuba

Sport
- Sport: Track and field
Medal record
Athletics
Representing Cuba
World Junior Championships
Gold medal – first place	1986 Athens	Javelin throw
Pan American Games
Gold medal – first place	1995 Mar del Plata	Javelin throw
Silver medal – second place	1999 Winnipeg	Javelin throw
Central American and Caribbean Games
Silver medal – second place	1993 Ponce	Javelin throw
CAC Junior Championships (U20)
Gold medal – first place	1986 Mexico City	Javelin throw

Xiomara Rivero Azcuy (born 24 December 1968) is a retired track and field athlete from Cuba, who competed in the javelin throw. Her personal best throw is 65.29 metres from March 2001.

== International competitions ==
Year	Competition	Venue	Position	Event	Notes
Representing Cuba
1986	Central American and Caribbean Junior Championships (U-20)	Mexico City, México	1st	Javelin	64.56 m A
1986	World Junior Championships	Athens, Greece	1st	Javelin	62.86 m
1993	Central American and Caribbean Games	Ponce, Puerto Rico	2nd	Javelin	57.02 m
1995	World Championships	Gothenburg, Sweden	16th (q)	Javelin	58.32 m
1995	Pan American Games	Mar del Plata, Argentina	1st	Javelin	63.92 m
1996	Olympic Games	Atlanta, Georgia, United States	5th	Javelin	64.48 m
1999	Pan American Games	Winnipeg, Canada	2nd	Javelin	62.46 m
1999	World Championships	Seville, Spain	19th	Javelin	57.48 m
2000	Ibero American Championships	Rio de Janeiro, Brazil	1st	Javelin	60.43 m
2000	Olympic Games	Sydney, Australia	6th	Javelin	62.92 m
2001	World Championships	Edmonton, Canada	7th	Javelin	61.60 m
2002	Ibero American Championships	Ciudad de Guatemala, Guatemala	2nd	Javelin	61.41 m
