= 1997 European Athletics U23 Championships – Women's javelin throw =

The women's javelin throw event at the 1997 European Athletics U23 Championships was held in Turku, Finland, on 12 July 1997.

== Medalists ==
Gold	Taina Uppa; Finland
Silver	Alina Serdyuk; Belarus
Bronze	Merja Pitkänen; Finland

== Results ==
=== Final ===
12 July

Rank	Name	Nationality	Attempts						Result	Notes
Rank	Name	Nationality	1	2	3	4	5	6	Result	Notes
1st place, gold medalist(s)	Taina Uppa	Finland	55.40	55.72	53.74	x	56.48	x	56.48	
2nd place, silver medalist(s)	Alina Serdyuk	Belarus	50.28	54.64	51.46	51.06	55.56	52.54	55.56	
3rd place, bronze medalist(s)	Merja Pitkänen	Finland	53.62	55.24	54.50	x	x	x	55.24	
4	Kirsty Morrison	Great Britain	45.12	49.00	50.88	52.18	52.24	54.14	54.14	
5	Evfemija Štorga	Slovenia	50.54	52.68	53.36	51.08	x	x	53.36	
6	Oksana Dudlina	Russia	52.36	x	x	x	x	x	52.36	
7	Carmen Filip	Romania	46.38	50.46	47.68	47.78	48.32	52.12	52.12	
8	Vigdís Guðjónsdóttir	Iceland	48.72	47.94	52.10	48.46	48.74	48.20	52.10	

== Participation ==
According to an unofficial count, 8 athletes from 7 countries participated in the event.

- Belarus (1)
- Finland (2)
- Great Britain (1)
- Iceland (1)
- Romania (1)
- Russia (1)
- Slovenia (1)
