= Hristina Georgieva =

Bulgarian javelin thrower

Hristina Tancheva Georgieva (Bulgarian: Христина Георгиева; born 3 January 1972 in Sofia) is a female javelin thrower from Bulgaria. Her personal best throw is 63.32 metres, achieved in June 2000 in Athens.

== Achievements ==
Year	Competition	Venue	Position	Notes
Representing Bulgaria
1990	World Junior Championships	Plovdiv, Bulgaria	15th (q)	47.10 m
1999	World Championships	Seville, Spain	23rd	55.79 m
2000	Olympic Games	Sydney, Australia	28th	54.60 m
2004	Olympic Games	Athens, Greece	32nd	55.13 m
