= Ewa Rybak =

Polish javelin thrower

Personal information
- Born: 22 December 1974 (age 51) Brodnica County, Poland

Sport
- Sport: Track and field
Medal record
Representing Poland
Summer Universiade
Gold medal – first place	1999 Palma de Mallorca	Javelin throw
European Junior Championships
Bronze medal – third place	1993 San Sebastian	Javelin throw

Ewa Rybak (born 22 December 1974) is a retired javelin thrower from Poland. She set her personal best (60.76 metres) on 11 July 1999 in Palma de Mallorca, winning the gold medal in the women's javelin throw event at the 1999 Summer Universiade.

== Achievements ==
Year	Competition	Venue	Position	Event	Notes
Representing Poland
1993	European Junior Championships	San Sebastián, Spain	3rd	Javelin (old)	54.80 m
1997	World Championships	Athens, Greece	21st (q)	Javelin (old)	56.24 m
1997	Universiade	Catania, Italy	4th	Javelin (old)	60.28 m
1998	European Championships	Budapest, Hungary	12th	Javelin (old)	56.65 m
1999	Universiade	Palma de Mallorca, Spain	1st	Javelin (new)	60.76 m
1999	World Championships	Seville, Spain	22nd (q)	Javelin (new)	56.41 m
