= Taina Ojaniemi =

Finnish javelin thrower (born 1976)

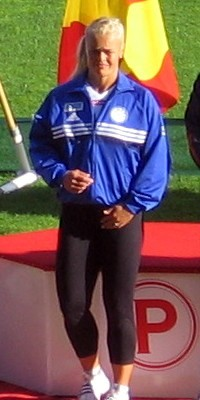
Taina Kolkkala in Kalevan kisat 2008

Taina Maria Ojaniemi, formerly Kolkkala, née Uppa (born 24 October 1976 in Pori) is a retired female javelin thrower from Finland. Her personal best is 64.06 metres, achieved in July 2000 in Pihtipudas. She is nicknamed "Taikku".

== International competitions ==
Year	Competition	Venue	Position	Notes
Representing Finland
1992	World Junior Championships	Seoul, South Korea	15th (q)	49.98 m (old spec.)
1994	World Junior Championships	Lisbon, Portugal	1st	59.02 m (old spec.)
1994	European Championships	Helsinki, Finland	10th	57.20 m (old spec.)
1996	Olympic Games	Atlanta, United States	19th	57.74 m
1997	European U23 Championships	Turku, Finland	1st	56.48 m (old spec.)
1997	World Championships	Gothenburg, Sweden	24th	54.38 m
1998	European Championships	Budapest, Hungary	14th	58.01 m
1999	World Championships	Seville, Spain	10th	59.83 m
2000	Olympic Games	Sydney, Australia	20th	57.39 m
2001	World Championships	Edmonton, Canada	12th	57.21 m
2002	European Championships	Munich, Germany	7th	59.81 m
2003	World Championships	Paris, France	10th	57.50 m
2004	Olympic Games	Athens, Greece	10th	60.72 m
2004	World Athletics Final	Monte Carlo, Monaco	4th	60.00 m
2007	World Championships	Osaka, Japan	13th	59.52 m
