= Wei Jianhua =

Chinese javelin thrower

Wei Jianhua (simplified Chinese: 魏建华; traditional Chinese: 魏建華; pinyin: Wèi Jiànhuá; born March 23, 1979) is a retired female javelin thrower from PR China. Her personal best throw is 63.92 metres, achieved in August 2000 in Beijing. This stood as the Asian record for the event until April 2012 when fellow Chinese thrower Lü Huihui threw the spear 64.95 m.

Throwing with the old javelin model she topped the podium at the 1997 Chinese Games with a throw of 66.64 m. She won the bronze medal at the 1998 World Junior Championships in Athletics and quickly rose to the top of the sport. She competed at 2000 Summer Olympics and the World Championships in Athletics in 1999 and 2001, finishing in the top ten each time. In 2001, she also won the East Asian Games title and a bronze medal at the 2001 Summer Universiade.

She was born in Chengdu, Sichuan but competed for Shanxi regionally. A severe injury to her right shoulder in 2002 brought an early end to her career. Upon reflection she said the injury enabled her to break from a life dedicated to training and start a family with her husband. She became involved with the sport again in 2012, coaching and assembling a regional team in Shanxi.

== International competitions ==
Year	Competition	Venue	Position	Notes
Representing China
1998	World Junior Championships	Annecy, France	3rd	59.10 m
1999	World Championships	Seville, Spain	7th	62.97 m
2000	Olympic Games	Sydney, Australia	10th	58.33 m
2001	East Asian Games	Osaka, Japan	1st	61.10 m
2001	World Championships	Edmonton, Canada	10th	58.45 m
2001	Universiade	Beijing, China	3rd	57.84 m
