= 1993 European Athletics Junior Championships =

- Level: Under 20
- Events: 41

The 1993 European Athletics Junior Championships was the twelfth edition of the biennial athletics competition for European athletes aged under twenty. It was held in San Sebastián, Spain between 29 July and 1 August.

== Men's results ==
Event	Gold		Silver		Bronze	
100 m	Danny Joyce (GBR)	10.63	Rafael Gruszecki (GER)	10.64	Ejike Wodu (GBR)	10.77
200 m (wind: 2.2 m/s)	Andrea Colombo (ITA)	21.14 w	Joakim Öhman (SWE)	21.14 w	Maurizio Checcucci (ITA)	21.24 w
400 m	Guy Bullock (GBR)	46.13	Rikard Rasmusson (SWE)	46.84	Valentin Kulbatskiy (UKR)	46.88
800 m	Andrzej Zahorski (POL)	1:53.49	Vladimir Gorelyov (RUS)	1:53.81	David Matthews (IRL)	1:54.00
1500 m	Reyes Estévez (ESP)	3:45.00	Javier Rodríguez (ESP)	3:46.33	Massimo Pegoretti (ITA)	3:47.07
5000 m	Vener Kashayev (RUS)	13:54.32	Mounir Khelil (FRA)	14:08.47	Arnaud Crepieux (FRA)	14:10.71
10,000 m	Ricardo Fernández (ESP)	29:37.75	Valeriy Kuzman (RUS)	29:40.00	Aleksey Sobolev (RUS)	29:41.68
110 m hurdles	Robin Korving (NED)	13.85	Tibor Bédi (HUN)	14.06	Frank Busemann (GER)	14.21
400 m hurdles	Carlos Silva (POR)	50.27	Francesco Ricci (ITA)	51.04	Noel Levy (GBR)	51.47
3000 m s'chase	Adam Dobrzyński (POL)	8:44.71	Stefano Ciallella (ITA)	8:51.46	Pascal Garin (FRA)	8:52.68
10,000 m walk	Michele Didoni (ITA)	40:05.62	Dmitriy Yesipchuk (RUS)	40:26.08	Heiko Valentin (GER)	40:37.78
4 × 100 m relay	Great Britain (GBR); Allyn Condon; Danny Joyce; Paul Bolton; Ejike Wodu	40.01	France (FRA); Guillaume Pihery; Olivier Arnaud; Christoph Colombo; Needy Guims	40.03	Ukraine (UKR); Vitaly Seniv; Valentin Kulbatskiy; Vyacheslav Kabanov; Kostyantyn Rurak	40.21
4 × 400 m relay	Great Britain (GBR); Nick Budden; Allyn Condon; Paul Slythe; Guy Bullock	3:07.39	Germany (GER); Ulrich Schnorrenberger; Axel Weyhing; Jens Dautzenberg; Marco Seidler	3:08.39	Poland (POL); Marcin Trelka; Przemysław Sznurkowski; Krzysztof Mehlich; Piotr Rysiukiewicz	3:08.75
High jump	Aleksandr Zhuravlyov (UKR)	2.21	Vyacheslav Voronin (RUS)	2.18	Tomáš Janků (CZE)	2.18
Pole vault	Khalid Lachheb (FRA)	5.40	Taoufik Lachheb (FRA)	5.35	Viktor Chistyakov (RUS)	5.35
Long jump	Carl Howard (GBR)	7.76	Kenneth Kastrén (FIN)	7.61	Yassin Guellet (BEL)	7.59
Triple jump	Paolo Camossi (ITA)	16.41	Rostislav Dimitrov (BUL)	16.35	Larry Achike (GBR)	16.31
Shot put	Manuel Martínez Gutiérrez (ESP)	19.02	Elias Louka (CYP)	18.48	Arsi Harju (FIN)	17.82
Discus throw	Leonid Cherevko (BLR)	54.98	Timo Sinervo (FIN)	54.30	Mika Loikkanen (FIN)	54.26
Hammer throw	Vadim Burakov (BLR)	67.16	Sergey Kochetkov (UKR)	66.04	Vadim Khersontsev (RUS)	65.44
Javelin throw	Dimítrios Polymerou (GRE)	72.80	Matti Närhi (FIN)	71.74	Jörg Tobisch (GER)	70.24
Decathlon	Christer Holger (SWE)	7534	Jan Poděbradský (CZE)	7396	Stefan Vogt (GER)	7338

== Women's results ==
Event	Gold		Silver		Bronze	
100 m	Hana Benešová (CZE)	11.56	Katharine Merry (GBR)	11.58	Oksana Dyachenko (RUS)	11.66
200 m	Katharine Merry (GBR)	23.35	Hana Benešová (CZE)	23.53	Sophia Smith (GBR)	23.63
400 m	Maria Magdalena Nedelcu (ROU)	52.24	Lucie Rangassamy (FRA)	53.16	Sandra Kuschmann (GER)	53.17
800 m	Ludmila Formanová (CZE)	2:06.88	Tytti Reho (FIN)	2:08.11	Emilie Neveu (FRA)	2:08.13
1500 m	Marta Domínguez (ESP)	4:17.26	Elena Cosoveanu (ROU)	4:17.53	Anne Bruns (GER)	4:20.02
3000 m	Gabriela Szabo (ROU)	8:50.97	Annemari Sandell (FIN)	8:51.22	Denisa Costescu (ROU)	9:13.03
10,000 m	Patrizia Ritondo (ITA)	34:26.06	Filiya Shemeyeva (RUS)	34:27.13	Lyudmila Biktasheva (RUS)	34:28.04
100 m hurdles	Diane Allahgreen (GBR)	13.42	Katja Fust (GER)	13.55	Sophie Marrot (FRA)	13.69
400 m hurdles	Ionela Tîrlea (ROU)	56.43	Anita Oppong (GER)	57.90	Lana Jekabsone (LAT)	58.07
5000 m walk	Susana Feitór (POR)	21:21.80	Natalya Trofimova (RUS)	21:39.75	Irina Stankina (RUS)	21:49.65
4 × 100 m relay	Great Britain (GBR); Diane Allahgreen; Katharine Merry; Sophia Smith; Debbie Mant	44.31	France (FRA); Sylvie Jalinier; Gwenolee Helbert; Delphine Combe; Sylviane Félix	44.38	Germany (GER); Sandra Roos; Birgit Brodbeck; Carmen Bertmaring; Gabriele Becker	44.60
4 × 400 m relay	Germany (GER); Susanne Merkel; Andrea Bornscheuer; Anita Oppong; Sandra Kuschmann	3:33.91	Russia (RUS); Tatyana Borisova; Yekaterina Struzhkina; Yekaterina Leshchova; Yuliya Zvyagina	3:39.76	France (FRA); Marie Gagneur; Xavier Dufourt; Mona Lahouassa; Lucie Rangassamy	3:41.53
High jump	Sabrina De Leeuw (BEL)	1.89	Desislava Aleksandrova (BUL)	1.89	Natalya Shimon (UKR)	1.86
Long jump	Erica Johansson (SWE)	6.56	Olga Rublyova (RUS)	6.44	Cristina Nicolau (ROU)	6.44
Triple jump	Yelena Lysak (RUS)	13.86	Natalya Klimovets (BLR)	13.65	Irina Melnikova (RUS)	13.53
Shot put	Marika Tuliniemi (FIN)	17.93	Nadine Kleinert (GER)	17.07	Corrie de Bruin (NED)	16.76
Discus throw	Corrie de Bruin (NED)	55.30	Viktoriya Boyko (UKR)	53.14	Lyudmila Starovoytova (BLR)	52.02
Javelin throw	Mikaela Ingberg (FIN)	56.64	Kirsty Morrison (GBR)	55.92	Ewa Rybak (POL)	54.80
Heptathlon	Kathleen Gutjahr (GER)	5650	Karin Specht (GER)	5548	Lyudmila Mashchenko (RUS)	5432

== Medal table ==
Rank	Nation	Gold	Silver	Bronze	Total
1	Great Britain (GBR)	8	1	4	13
2	Italy (ITA)	4	2	2	8
3	Spain (ESP)	4	1	0	5
4	Romania (ROM)	3	1	2	6
5	Russia (RUS)	2	8	8	18
6	Germany (GER)	2	7	7	16
7	Finland (FIN)	2	5	2	9
8	Czech Republic (CZE)	2	2	1	5
9	Sweden (SWE)	2	2	0	4
10	Belarus (BLR)	2	1	1	4
11	Poland (POL)	2	0	2	4
12	Netherlands (NED)	2	0	1	3
13	Portugal (POR)	2	0	0	2
14	France (FRA)	1	5	5	11
15	Ukraine (UKR)	1	2	3	6
16	Belgium (BEL)	1	0	1	2
17	Greece (GRE)	1	0	0	1
18	Bulgaria (BUL)	0	2	0	2
19	Cyprus (CYP)	0	1	0	1
19	Hungary (HUN)	0	1	0	1
21	Ireland (IRL)	0	0	1	1
21	Latvia (LAT)	0	0	1	1
Totals (22 entries)		41	41	41	123
