= Maka Obolashvili =

Georgian athlete

Maka Obolashvili (born 17 June 1975) is a retired Georgian track and field athlete, who specialized in the hammer throw and javelin throw during her career.

== Achievements ==
- All results regarding javelin throw, unless stated otherwise

Year	Competition	Venue	Position	Notes
Representing Georgia
1994	World Junior Championships	Lisbon, Portugal	17th (q)	47.62 m (old spec.)
1995	World Championships	Gothenburg, Sweden	30th	43.98 m
1999	World Championships	Seville, Spain	—	NM
