= 2001 World Championships in Athletics – Women's javelin throw =

The final of the Women's Javelin Throw event at the 2001 World Championships in Edmonton, Alberta, Canada was held on Monday August 6, 2001. There were a total number of 22 participating athletes, with the qualification mark was set at 61.00 metres. Cuba's eventual winner Osleidys Menéndez broke the event record twice during the final, in her second (69.42 metres) and third attempt (69.53 metres).

== Medalists ==
Gold	Osleidys Menéndez; Cuba (CUB)
Silver	Mirela Manjani-Tzelili; Greece (GRE)
Bronze	Sonia Bisset; Cuba (CUB)

== Schedule ==
- All times are Mountain Standard Time (UTC−7)

Qualification Round
Group A	Group B
04.08.2001 – 14:35h	04.08.2001 – 16:25h
Final Round
06.08.2001 – 17:05h

== Abbreviations ==
- All results shown are in metres

Q	automatic qualification
q	qualification by rank
DNS	did not start
NM	no mark
WR	world record
AR	area record
NR	national record
PB	personal best
SB	season best

== Records ==
Standing records prior to the 2001 World Athletics Championships
World Record	Osleidys Menéndez (CUB)	71.54 m	July 1, 2001	Rethymno, Greece
Event Record	Mirela Manjani-Tzelili (GRE)	67.09 m	August 28, 1999	Seville, Spain
Season Best	Osleidys Menéndez (CUB)	71.54 m	July 1, 2001	Rethymno, Greece
Broken records during the 2001 World Athletics Championships
Event Record	Osleidys Menéndez (CUB)	69.53 m	August 6, 2001	Edmonton, Canada

== Qualification ==
=== Group A ===
Rank	Overall	Athlete	Attempts			Distance	Note
Rank	Overall	Athlete	1	2	3	Distance	Note
1	1	Nikola Tomecková (CZE)	X	65.71	—	65.71 m	Q, NR
2	3	Sonia Bisset (CUB)	60.78	63.24	—	63.24 m	Q
3	5	Mirela Manjani-Tzelili (GRE)	61.75	—	—	61.75 m	Q
4	7	Wei Jianhua (CHN)	61.56	—	—	61.56 m	Q, SB
5	9	Mikaela Ingberg (FIN)	59.59	60.89	57.83	60.89 m	q
6	13	Paula Huhtaniemi (FIN)	53.68	58.26	X	58.26 m	
7	14	Nikolett Szabó (HUN)	57.21	X	57.60	57.60 m	
8	15	Rita Ramanauskaitė (LTU)	52.72	57.43	X	57.43 m	
9	18	Takako Miyake (JPN)	55.81	56.05	54.94	56.05 m	
10	19	Ana Mirela Țermure (ROM)	X	52.14	52.65	52.65 m	
11	22	Dominique Bilodeau (CAN)	45.24	X	44.01	45.24 m	

=== Group B ===
Rank	Overall	Athlete	Attempts			Distance	Note
Rank	Overall	Athlete	1	2	3	Distance	Note
1	2	Osleidys Menéndez (CUB)	64.39	—	—	64.39 m	Q
2	4	Aggeliki Tsiolakoudi (GRE)	60.22	61.93	—	61.93 m	Q
3	6	Steffi Nerius (GER)	61.90	—	—	61.90 m	Q
4	8	Tatyana Shikolenko (RUS)	59.40	61.42	—	61.42 m	Q
5	10	Xiomara Rivero (CUB)	59.78	58.60	59.14	59.78 m	q
6	11	Taina Kolkkala (FIN)	54.83	59.62	59.06	59.62 m	q, SB
7	12	Claudia Coslovich (ITA)	58.42	53.76	58.34	58.42 m	q
8	16	Felicia Țilea-Moldovan (ROM)	56.61	X	X	56.61 m	
9	17	Laverne Eve (BAH)	55.26	X	56.10	56.10 m	
10	20	Zuleima Araméndiz (COL)	52.23	50.70	50.98	52.23 m	
11	21	Lindy Leveaux (SEY)	49.01	49.40	X	49.40 m	

== Final ==
Rank	Athlete	Attempts						Distance	Note
Rank	Athlete	1	2	3	4	5	6	Distance	Note
1st place, gold medalist(s)	Osleidys Menéndez (CUB)	66.56	69.42	69.53	X	65.63	66.70	69.53 m	CR
2nd place, silver medalist(s)	Mirela Manjani-Tzelili (GRE)	64.69	63.80	X	X	65.78	62.68	65.78 m	
3rd place, bronze medalist(s)	Sonia Bisset (CUB)	63.14	X	57.77	61.32	64.69	X	64.69 m	
4	Nikola Tomecková (CZE)	63.11	62.91	X	X	62.74	59.83	63.11 m	
5	Steffi Nerius (GER)	62.08	X	58.52	X	X	56.01	62.08 m	
6	Mikaela Ingberg (FIN)	61.94	60.40	X	57.91	60.89	60.91	61.94 m	
7	Xiomara Rivero (CUB)	58.56	61.60	59.00	61.27	61.43	61.40	61.60 m	
8	Aggeliki Tsiolakoudi (GRE)	61.01	57.88	58.61	60.74	58.17	58.96	61.01 m	
9	Tatyana Shikolenko (RUS)	59.26	60.91	X				60.91 m	
10	Wei Jianhua (CHN)	52.48	58.31	58.45				58.45 m	
11	Claudia Coslovich (ITA)	54.46	57.27	56.08				57.27 m	
12	Taina Kolkkala (FIN)	53.72	57.21	53.19				57.21 m	

== See also ==
- 1998 Women's European Championships Javelin Throw (Budapest)
- 2000 Women's Olympic Javelin Throw (Sydney)
- 2002 Women's European Championships Javelin Throw (Munich)
- 2004 Women's Olympic Javelin Throw (Athens)
