= Lynda Blutreich =

American javelin thrower

Personal information
- Born: December 13, 1971 (age 54) Lynn, Massachusetts, United States

Sport
- Sport: Track and field

Lynda Blutreich (née Lipson; born December 13, 1971) is a three-time USATF champion javelin thrower from the United States.

She was on the college track team at the University of North Carolina, Chapel Hill.

She is also a photographer and member of Art of the Olympians (AOTO)

== International competitions ==
Year	Competition	Venue	Position	Notes
Representing the United States
1995	Pan American Games	Mar del Plata, Argentina	7th	50.82 m
1997	World Championships	Athens, Greece	37th (q)	52.64 m
1998	Goodwill Games	Uniondale, United States	6th	53.51 m
1999	Pan American Games	Winnipeg, Canada	5th	55.77 m
1999	World Championships	Seville, Spain	25th (q)	52.31 m
2000	Olympic Games	Sydney, Australia	26th (q)	55.25 m
