= 1986 World Junior Championships in Athletics – women's javelin throw =

The women's javelin throw event at the 1986 World Junior Championships in Athletics was held in Athens, Greece, at Olympic Stadium on 18 and 19 July. An old specification 600g javelin was used.

== Medalists ==
Gold	Xiomara Rivero; Cuba
Silver	Anja Reiter; East Germany
Bronze	Alexandra Beck; East Germany

== Results ==
=== Final ===
19 July

Rank	Name	Nationality	Result	Notes
1st place, gold medalist(s)	Xiomara Rivero	Cuba	62.86	
2nd place, silver medalist(s)	Anja Reiter	East Germany	60.24	
3rd place, bronze medalist(s)	Alexandra Beck	East Germany	59.92	
4	Tatyana Shikolenko	Soviet Union	55.70	
5	Karen Hough	United Kingdom	55.40	
6	Sun Xiurong	China	53.20	
7	Isel López	Cuba	53.00	
8	Naomi Tokuyama	Japan	51.80	
9	Brooke Allen	United States	47.64	
10	Louise Perreault	Canada	47.32	
11	Jane Woodhead	United States	45.22	
12	Stefania Galbiati	Italy	43.98	

=== Qualifications ===
18 Jul

==== Group A ====
Rank	Name	Nationality	Result	Notes
1	Xiomara Rivero	Cuba	58.12	Q
2	Anja Reiter	East Germany	56.66	Q
3	Alexandra Beck	East Germany	55.12	Q
4	Sun Xiurong	China	54.24	Q
5	Tatyana Shikolenko	Soviet Union	52.66	Q
6	Isel López	Cuba	51.08	Q
7	Naomi Tokuyama	Japan	49.76	q
8	Brooke Allen	United States	48.80	q
9	Stefania Galbiati	Italy	47.90	q
10	Karen Hough	United Kingdom	47.64	q
11	Jane Woodhead	United States	47.32	q
12	Louise Perreault	Canada	46.40	q
13	Lidia Peceva	Bulgaria	46.04	
14	Ines Staudigl	Austria	45.92	
15	Pia Lahti	Finland	45.58	
16	Nicole Heuwekemeier	Netherlands	45.42	
17	Khrysoula Maguina	Greece	45.38	
18	Jaana Suuronen	Finland	44.42	
19	Ayumi Tokumoto	Japan	43.04	
20	Tashlyn Chase	Canada	41.28	
	Shiny Verghese	India	NM	

== Participation ==
According to an unofficial count, 21 athletes from 15 countries participated in the event.

- Austria (1)
- Bulgaria (1)
- Canada (2)
- China (1)
- Cuba (2)
- East Germany (2)
- Finland (2)
- Greece (1)
- India (1)
- Italy (1)
- Japan (2)
- Netherlands (1)
- Soviet Union (1)
- United Kingdom (1)
- United States (2)
