= Athletics at the 1999 Pan American Games – Women's javelin throw =

Women's javelin throw at the Pan American Games

The women's javelin throw event at the 1999 Pan American Games was held on July 27.

== Results ==
Rank	Name	Nationality	#1	#2	#3	#4	#5	#6	Result	Notes
1st place, gold medalist(s)	Osleidys Menéndez	Cuba	61.86	59.60	x	62.30	65.66	65.85	65.85	GR
2nd place, silver medalist(s)	Xiomara Rivero	Cuba	57.31	60.74	60.34	61.36	62.46	60.22	62.46	
3rd place, bronze medalist(s)	Laverne Eve	Bahamas	57.60	58.53	x	61.24	x	59.05	61.24	
4	Sabina Moya	Colombia	53.49	54.63	55.86	55.38	51.08	4.90	55.86	
5	Lynda Blutreich	United States	55.02	x	55.15	54.52	55.77	54.70	55.77	
6	Sueli dos Santos	Brazil	51.17	47.52	52.42	52.58	50.53	47.47	52.58	
7	Olivia McKoy	Jamaica	49.29	x	45.39	47.35	48.29	47.38	49.29	
8	Cassi Morelock	United States	45.62	48.34	45.74	x	x	46.40	48.34	
	Zuleima Araméndiz	Colombia							DNS	
