= 1992 World Junior Championships in Athletics – Women's javelin throw =

The women's javelin throw event at the 1992 World Junior Championships in Athletics was held in Seoul, South Korea, at Olympic Stadium on 18 and 19 September. An old-specification 600 g javelin was used.

== Medalists ==
Gold	Claudia Isaila; Romania
Silver	Yvonne Reichardt; Germany
Bronze	Heli Tolkkinen; Finland

== Results ==
=== Final ===
19 September

Rank	Name	Nationality	Attempts						Result	Notes
Rank	Name	Nationality	1	2	3	4	5	6	Result	Notes
1st place, gold medalist(s)	Claudia Isaila	Romania	58.72	55.44	61.30	63.04	62.52	62.92	63.04	
2nd place, silver medalist(s)	Yvonne Reichardt	Germany	58.00	58.34	54.32	61.48	60.36	53.44	61.48	
3rd place, bronze medalist(s)	Heli Tolkkinen	Finland	58.00	6.00	56.48	57.16	60.12	57.28	60.12	
4	Shelley Holroyd	United Kingdom	52.62	57.08	56.78	55.16	55.76	55.84	57.08	
5	Dörthe Barby	Germany	56.26	56.52	55.06	x	48.78	x	56.52	
6	Yang Lijuan	China	56.08	44.08	53.70	55.12	50.58	53.64	56.08	
7	Silvana Koren	Slovenia	x	54.48	46.52	x	x	46.94	54.48	
8	Antigoni Vourdoli	Greece	48.80	52.82	52.94	52.30	x	x	52.94	
9	Lee Yeong-Seon	South Korea	52.82	x	x				52.82	
10	María De La Caridad Álvarez	Cuba	50.26	52.58	50.18				52.58	
11	Nikola Tomecková	Czechoslovakia	51.96	x	x				51.96	
12	Tatyana Sudarikova	Commonwealth of Independent States	51.90	51.72	45.18				51.90	
13	Ágnes Preisinger	Hungary	48.94	48.62	x				48.94	

=== Qualifications ===
18 Sep

==== Group A ====
Rank	Name	Nationality	Attempts			Result	Notes
Rank	Name	Nationality	1	2	3	Result	Notes
1	Claudia Isaila	Romania	57.40	-	-	57.40	Q
2	Yvonne Reichardt	Germany	56.16	-	-	56.16	Q
3	Heli Tolkkinen	Finland	54.76	-	-	54.76	Q
4	Nikola Tomecková	Czechoslovakia	53.26	-	-	53.26	Q
5	Silvana Koren	Slovenia	40.76	49.46	51.66	51.66	Q
6	Ágnes Preisinger	Hungary	51.48	-	-	51.48	Q
7	Karen Martin	United Kingdom	46.88	50.22	47.86	50.22	
8	Choe Ouk-Hwa	South Korea	49.86	48.02	47.80	49.86	
9	Sabina Guarnelli	Italy	49.56	41.96	41.82	49.56	
10	Anne Gro Rosseland	Norway	47.94	46.16	48.70	48.70	
11	Birute Valakaite	Lithuania	x	x	46.88	46.88	
12	Olga Ivankova	Commonwealth of Independent States	46.36	45.72	x	46.36	
13	Yanuris Lamontana	Cuba	x	46.14	45.18	46.14	
14	Takako Miyake	Japan	42.64	44.22	x	44.22	
15	Tonia Roth	United States	44.12	43.54	x	44.12	

==== Group B ====
Rank	Name	Nationality	Attempts			Result	Notes
Rank	Name	Nationality	1	2	3	Result	Notes
1	María De La Caridad Álvarez	Cuba	56.40	-	-	56.40	Q
2	Tatyana Sudarikova	Commonwealth of Independent States	42.52	56.16	-	56.16	Q
3	Dörthe Barby	Germany	55.46	-	-	55.46	Q
4	Yang Lijuan	China	55.42	-	-	55.42	Q
5	Lee Yeong-Seon	South Korea	53.44	-	-	53.44	Q
6	Shelley Holroyd	United Kingdom	50.64	52.44	-	52.44	Q
7	Antigoni Vourdoli	Greece	51.90	-	-	51.90	Q
8	Taina Uppa	Finland	46.22	49.98	48.28	49.98	
9	Zuleima Araméndiz	Colombia	45.12	x	49.76	49.76	
10	Leslie Coons	United States	49.22	44.64	46.24	49.22	
11	Tomomi Aoshima	Japan	45.90	48.12	47.42	48.12	
12	Nina Dubowski	Norway	38.56	43.72	44.34	44.34	
13	Nikola Hartmann	Austria	39.80	38.98	42.90	42.90	

== Participation ==
According to an unofficial count, 28 athletes from 19 countries participated in the event.

- Austria (1)
- China (1)
- Colombia (1)
- Commonwealth of Independent States (2)
- Cuba (2)
- Czechoslovakia (1)
- Finland (2)
- Germany (2)
- Greece (1)
- Hungary (1)
- Italy (1)
- Japan (2)
- Lithuania (1)
- Norway (2)
- Romania (1)
- Slovenia (1)
- South Korea (2)
- United Kingdom (2)
- United States (2)
