= Sabina Moya =

Colombian javelin thrower (born 1977)

Personal information
- Full name: Sabina Moya Rivas
- Born: 27 January 1977 (age 49) Turbo, Antioquia, Colombia
- Height: 1.65 m (5 ft 5 in)
- Weight: 61 kg (134 lb)

Sport
- Country: Colombia
- Sport: Athletics
- Event: Javelin throw
Medal record
Women's athletics
Representing Colombia
South American Games
Gold medal – first place	1998 Cuenca	Javelin throw
Bolivarian Games
Gold medal – first place	2001 Ambato	Javelin throw
Silver medal – second place	1997 Arequipa	Javelin throw
South American Youth Championships
Silver medal – second place	1992 Santiago	Javelin throw
- Updated on 10 May 2013

Sabina Moya Rivas (born 27 January 1977) is a Colombian retired javelin thrower.

== Career ==
She set her personal best (62.62 metres) on 12 May 2002 in Guatemala City, Guatemala.

== Achievements ==
Year	Competition	Venue	Position	Event	Notes
Representing Colombia
1992	South American Youth Championships	Santiago, Chile	6th	Discus	36.74 m
1992	South American Youth Championships	Santiago, Chile	2nd	Javelin (old spec.)	42.40 m
1994	World Junior Championships	Lisbon, Portugal	28th (q)	Javelin (old spec.)	36.78 m
1996	World Junior Championships	Sydney, Australia	10th	Javelin (old spec.)	50.40 m
1997	South American Championships	Mar del Plata, Argentina	2nd	Javelin	55.30 m
1997	Central American and Caribbean Championships	San Juan, Puerto Rico	3rd	Javelin	55.94 m
1997	Bolivarian Games	Arequipa, Peru	2nd	Javelin	49.94 m A
1998	Ibero-American Championships	Lisbon, Portugal	1st	Javelin	58.65 m
1998	Central American and Caribbean Games	Maracaibo, Venezuela	4th	Javelin	60.10 m
1998	South American Games	Cuenca, Ecuador	2nd	4 × 100 m	46.6 s
1998	South American Games	Cuenca, Ecuador	1st	Javelin	54.08 m
1999	South American Championships	Bogotá, Colombia	1st	Javelin	58.81 m
1999	Pan American Games	Winnipeg, Canada	4th	Javelin	55.86 m
1999	World Championships	Seville, Spain	28th	Javelin	47.27 m
2000	Ibero-American Championships	Rio de Janeiro, Brazil	4th	Javelin	55.16 m
2000	Olympic Games	Sydney, Australia	34th	Javelin	49.16 m
2001	Bolivarian Games	Ambato, Ecuador	1st	Javelin	55.58 m A
2002	Ibero-American Championships	Guatemala City, Guatemala	1st	Javelin	62.62 m
2002	Central American and Caribbean Games	San Salvador, El Salvador	2nd	Javelin	55.73 m
2003	South American Championships	Barquisimeto, Venezuela	1st	Javelin	58.30 m
2003	Pan American Games	Santo Domingo, Dominican Republic	4th	Javelin	60.17 m
2003	World Championships	Paris, France	19th	Javelin	55.75 m
2004	Ibero-American Championships	Huelva, Spain	6th	Javelin	54.17 m
2006	South American Championships	Tunja, Colombia	3rd	Javelin	54.52 m
