= Nikola Brejchová =

Czech javelin thrower

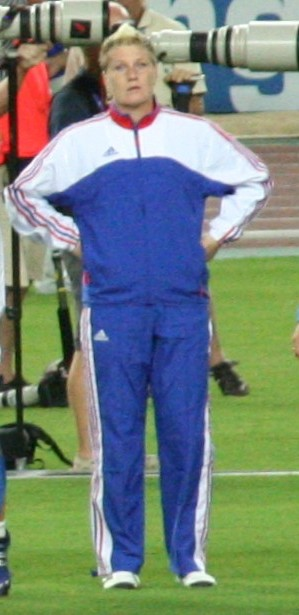
Nikola Brejchová in 2007

Nikola Brejchová, née Tomečková (Czech pronunciation: [ˈnɪkola ˈbrɛjxovaː ˈtomɛtʃkovaː]; born 25 June 1974 in Zlín) is a Czech javelin thrower. Her personal best throw is 65.91 metres, achieved in August 2004 in Linz.

== Achievements ==
Year	Competition	Venue	Position	Notes
Representing Czechoslovakia
1992	World Junior Championships	Seoul, South Korea	11th	51.96 m
Representing the Czech Republic
1993	World Championships	Stuttgart, Germany	22nd	52.06 m
1996	Olympic Games	Atlanta, United States	25th	55.02 m
1998	European Championships	Budapest, Hungary	13th	59.65 m
1999	World Championships	Seville, Spain	21st	56.88 m
2000	Olympic Games	Sydney, Australia	8th	62.10 m
2000	IAAF Grand Prix Final	Doha, Qatar	6th	62.59 m
2001	World Student Games	Beijing, China	2nd	62.20 m
2001	World Championships	Edmonton, Canada	4th	63.11 m
2004	Olympic Games	Athens, Greece	4th	64.23 m
2004	World Athletics Final	Monte Carlo, Monaco	2nd	64.58 m
2007	World Championships	Osaka, Japan	4th	63.73 m
