= Sonia Bisset =

Cuban javelin thrower

Personal information
- Full name: Sonia Bisset Poll
- Born: April 1, 1971 (age 55) Palma Soriano, Cuba

Achievements and titles
- Personal best: 67.67 m (2005)
Medal record
Athletics
Representing Cuba
World Championships
| Bronze medal – third place | 2001 Edmonton | Javelin throw |
Summer Universiade
| Silver medal – second place | 1997 Catania | Javelin throw |
Pan American Games
| Silver medal – second place | 2007 Rio de Janeiro | Javelin throw |
Central American and Caribbean Games
| Gold medal – first place | 1998 Maracaibo | Javelin throw |
| Gold medal – first place | 2006 Cartagena | Javelin throw |
CAC Junior Championships (U20)
| Silver medal – second place | 1990 Havana | Javelin throw |

Sonia Bisset Poll (born April 1, 1971) is a retired Cuban track and field athlete who competed in the javelin throw.

== Achievements ==
| Year | Competition | Venue | Position | Event | Notes |
Representing Cuba
| 1990 | Central American and Caribbean Junior Championships (U-20) | Havana, Cuba | 2nd | Javelin | 55.20 m |
| 1990 | World Junior Championships | Plovdiv, Bulgaria | 11th | Javelin | 49.46 m |
| 1994 | Ibero-American Championships | Mar del Plata, Argentina | 2nd | Javelin | 57.70 m |
| 1995 | Central American and Caribbean Championships | Guatemala City, Guatemala | 1st | Javelin | 62.24 m |
| 1996 | Ibero-American Championships | Medellín, Colombia | 1st | Javelin | 64.54 m |
| 1997 | World Championships | Athens, Greece | 6th | Javelin | 63.80 m |
| 1997 | Universiade | Catania, Italy | 2nd | Javelin | 63.46 m |
| 1998 | Goodwill Games | Uniondale, United States | 3rd | Javelin | 62.64 m |
| 1998 | Central American and Caribbean Games | Maracaibo, Venezuela | 1st | Javelin | 66.67 m |
| 1999 | World Championships | Seville, Spain | 6th | Javelin | 63.52 m |
| 2000 | Olympic Games | Sydney, Australia | 5th | Javelin | 63.26 m |
| 2000 | IAAF Grand Prix Final | Doha, Qatar | 1st | Javelin | 65.87 m |
| 2001 | World Championships | Edmonton, Canada | 3rd | Javelin | 64.69 m |
| 2003 | Pan American Games | Santo Domingo, Dominican Republic | 5th | Javelin | 58.00 m |
| 2003 | World Championships | Paris, France | 6th | Javelin | 60.17 m |
| 2004 | Ibero-American Championships | Huelva, Spain | 2nd | Javelin | 64.71 m |
| 2004 | Olympic Games | Athens, Greece | 5th | Javelin | 63.54 m |
| 2005 | World Championships | Helsinki, Finland | 7th | Javelin | 61.75 m |
| 2006 | Central American and Caribbean Games | Cartagena, Colombia | 1st | Javelin | 63.30 m |
| 2007 | Pan American Games | Rio de Janeiro, Brazil | 2nd | Javelin | 60.68 m |
| 2007 | World Championships | Osaka, Japan | 6th | Javelin | 61.74 m |
