= 1999 World Championships in Athletics – Women's javelin throw =

These are the official results of the Women's Javelin Throw event at the 1999 World Championships in Seville, Spain. There were a total number of 30 participating athletes, with the final held on Saturday 28 August 1999.

== Medalists ==
| Gold | Mirela Manjani-Tzelili; Greece (GRE) |
| Silver | Tatyana Shikolenko; Russia (RUS) |
| Bronze | Trine Solberg-Hattestad; Norway (NOR) |

== Schedule ==
- All times are Central European Time (UTC+1)

Qualification Round
| Group A | Group B |
|---|---|
| 26.08.1999 – 18:45h | 26.08.1999 – 20:40h |
Final Round
28.08.1999 – 19:10h

== Abbreviations ==
- All results shown are in metres

| Q | automatic qualification |
| q | qualification by rank |
| DNS | did not start |
| NM | no mark |
| WR | world record |
| AR | area record |
| NR | national record |
| PB | personal best |
| SB | season best |

== Startlist ==
| Order | No. | Athlete | Season Best | Personal Best |
GROUP A
| 1 | 868 | Tatyana Shikolenko (RUS) | 64.25 | 64.25 |
| 2 | 645 | Rita Ramanauskaitė (LTU) | 62.21 | 62.21 |
| 3 | 207 | Sonia Bisset (CUB) | | |
| 4 | 170 | Wei Jianhua (CHN) | 60.33 | 60.33 |
| 5 | 38 | Louise McPaul-Currey (AUS) | 66.03 | 66.03 |
| 6 | 408 | Karen Forkel (GER) | 65.17 | 65.17 |
| 7 | 216 | Osleidys Menéndez (CUB) | 66.45 | 66.45 |
| 8 | 432 | Steffi Nerius (GER) | 61.56 | 61.56 |
| 9 | 192 | Sabina Moya (COL) | 58.81 | 58.81 |
| 10 | 509 | Gurmeet Kaur (IND) | 55.86 | |
| 11 | 722 | Trine Solberg-Hattestad (NOR) | 68.19 | 68.19 |
| 12 | 745 | Genowefa Patla (POL) | 61.05 | 61.05 |
| 13 | 325 | Mikaela Ingberg (FIN) | 60.59 | 60.59 |
| 14 | 905 | Evfemija Štorga (SLO) | 59.30 | 59.30 |
| 15 | 807 | Felicia Țilea-Moldovan (ROM) | 60.97 | 60.97 |
GROUP B
| 1 | 329 | Taina Uppa (FIN) | 63.63 | 63.63 |
| 2 | 162 | Liang Lili (CHN) | 59.41 | 59.41 |
| 3 | 218 | Xiomara Rivero (CUB) | 62.46 | 62.46 |
| 4 | 853 | Oksana Ovchinnikova (RUS) | 64.61 | 64.61 |
| 5 | 806 | Ana Mirela Țermure (ROM) | 61.35 | 61.35 |
| 6 | 404 | Tanja Damaske (GER) | 66.91 | 66.91 |
| 7 | 610 | Lee Young-Sun (KOR) | 56.22 | 56.22 |
| 8 | 61 | Laverne Eve (BAH) | 62.94 | 62.94 |
| 9 | 115 | Khristina Georgieva (BUL) | 59.48 | 59.48 |
| 10 | 357 | Nadine Auzeil-Schoellkopf (FRA) | 61.08 | 61.08 |
| 11 | 462 | Mirela Manjani-Tzelili (GRE) | 66.55 | 66.55 |
| 12 | 393 | Maka Obolashvili (GEO) | | |
| 13 | 234 | Nikola Tomečková (CZE) | 60.92 | 60.92 |
| 14 | 995 | Lynda Blutreich (USA) | 57.14 | 57.14 |
| 15 | 753 | Ewa Rybak (POL) | 60.76 | 60.76 |

== Records ==
- A new javelin was introduced, officially from April 1, 1999

Standing records prior to the 1999 World Athletics Championships
| World Record | Trine Hattestad (NOR) | 68.19 m | July 28, 1999 | Bergen, Norway |
| Event Record | New record had to be set after the introduction of a new javelin | | | |
| Season Best | Trine Hattestad (NOR) | 68.19 m | July 28, 1999 | Bergen, Norway |
New records set during the 1999 World Athletics Championships
| Event Record | Trine Hattestad (NOR) | 62.67 m | August 26, 1999 | Seville, Spain |
| Event Record | Osleidys Menéndez (CUB) | 64.61 m | August 28, 1999 | Seville, Spain |
| Event Record | Trine Hattestad (NOR) | 66.06 m | August 28, 1999 | Seville, Spain |
| Event Record | Mirela Manjani-Tzelili (GRE) | 66.33 m | August 28, 1999 | Seville, Spain |
| Event Record | Mirela Manjani-Tzelili (GRE) | 67.09 m | August 28, 1999 | Seville, Spain |

== Qualification ==
=== Group A ===
| Rank | Overall | Athlete | Attempts | | | Distance | Note |
| Rank | Overall | Athlete | 1 | 2 | 3 | Distance | Note |
|---|---|---|---|---|---|---|---|
| 1 | 2 | Trine Solberg-Hattestad (NOR) | 62.67 | — | — | 62.67 m | |
| 2 | 3 | Osleidys Menéndez (CUB) | 62.07 | — | — | 62.07 m | |
| 3 | 4 | Tatyana Shikolenko (RUS) | 61.78 | — | — | 61.78 m | |
| 4 | 5 | Sonia Bisset (CUB) | 61.63 | — | — | 61.63 m | |
| 5 | 6 | Mikaela Ingberg (FIN) | 58.86 | 59.35 | 61.50 | 61.50 m | PB |
| 6 | 8 | Wei Jianhua (CHN) | 61.39 | — | — | 61.39 m | AR |
| 7 | 9 | Louise McPaul-Currey (AUS) | 60.83 | 59.62 | 56.51 | 60.83 m | |
| 8 | 11 | Karen Forkel (GER) | 55.66 | 60.40 | 59.04 | 60.40 m | |
| 9 | 12 | Felicia Țilea-Moldovan (ROM) | 60.11 | X | 57.78 | 60.11 m | |
| 10 | 13 | Genowefa Patla (POL) | 55.17 | 59.50 | 56.27 | 59.50 m | |
| 11 | 14 | Rita Ramanauskaitė (LTU) | 57.25 | 58.60 | X | 58.60 m | |
| 12 | 16 | Steffi Nerius (GER) | 58.43 | 57.07 | 57.05 | 58.43 m | |
| 13 | 24 | Evfemija Štorga (SLO) | X | 53.26 | 53.54 | 53.54 m | |
| 14 | 26 | Gurmeet Kaur (IND) | 51.97 | 51.76 | 47.90 | 51.97 m | |
| 15 | 28 | Sabina Moya (COL) | X | 47.27 | 44.27 | 47.27 m | |

=== Group B ===
| Rank | Overall | Athlete | Attempts | | | Distance | Note |
| Rank | Overall | Athlete | 1 | 2 | 3 | Distance | Note |
|---|---|---|---|---|---|---|---|
| 1 | 1 | Oksana Ovchinnikova (RUS) | 63.83 | — | — | 63.83 m | |
| 2 | 7 | Mirela Manjani-Tzelili (GRE) | 61.45 | — | — | 61.45 m | |
| 3 | 10 | Taina Uppa (FIN) | 60.51 | 59.02 | 60.47 | 60.51 m | |
| 4 | 15 | Ana Mirela Țermure (ROM) | 58.52 | X | 56.01 | 58.52 m | |
| 5 | 17 | Liang Lili (CHN) | 49.41 | 58.43 | 55.96 | 58.43 m | |
| 6 | 18 | Laverne Eve (BAH) | 55.22 | 55.79 | 57.97 | 57.97 m | |
| 7 | 19 | Xiomara Rivero (CUB) | X | X | 57.48 | 57.48 m | |
| 8 | 20 | Nadine Auzeil-Schoellkopf (FRA) | 54.62 | 55.92 | 57.33 | 57.33 m | |
| 9 | 21 | Nikola Tomečková (CZE) | 54.55 | X | 56.88 | 56.88 m | |
| 10 | 22 | Ewa Rybak (POL) | 55.12 | 56.41 | 56.14 | 56.41 m | |
| 11 | 23 | Khristina Georgieva (BUL) | 55.79 | 54.90 | 54.57 | 55.79 m | |
| 12 | 25 | Lynda Blutreich (USA) | 50.26 | 52.31 | 52.17 | 52.31 m | |
| 13 | 27 | Lee Young-Sun (KOR) | 50.33 | 51.36 | 51.31 | 51.36 m | |
| — | — | Maka Obolashvili (GEO) | X | X | — | NM | |
| — | — | Tanja Damaske (GER) | — | — | — | NM | |

== Final ==
| Rank | Athlete | Attempts | | | | | | Distance | Note |
| Rank | Athlete | 1 | 2 | 3 | 4 | 5 | 6 | Distance | Note |
|---|---|---|---|---|---|---|---|---|---|
| 1st place, gold medalist(s) | Mirela Manjani-Tzelili (GRE) | 62.41 | 66.33 | 67.09 | 66.44 | X | X | 67.09 m | PB |
| 2nd place, silver medalist(s) | Tatyana Shikolenko (RUS) | 63.75 | 62.28 | X | 62.51 | 66.37 | X | 66.37 m | PB |
| 3rd place, bronze medalist(s) | Trine Solberg-Hattestad (NOR) | 63.73 | 66.06 | 62.56 | 64.24 | 63.42 | 63.85 | 66.06 m | |
| 4 | Osleidys Menéndez (CUB) | 64.61 | 61.12 | 63.18 | 62.55 | 63.74 | 62.54 | 64.61 m | |
| 5 | Louise McPaul-Currey (AUS) | 60.39 | X | 60.81 | 64.38 | 61.10 | 60.75 | 64.38 m | |
| 6 | Sonia Bisset (CUB) | 61.62 | 61.74 | X | 63.52 | 61.08 | X | 63.52 m | PB |
| 7 | Wei Jianhua (CHN) | 58.98 | 62.27 | 62.97 | X | X | 57.66 | 62.97 m | AR |
| 8 | Oksana Ovchinnikova (RUS) | 59.23 | 62.67 | X | X | 60.16 | X | 62.67 m | |
| 9 | Mikaela Ingberg (FIN) | 56.48 | 59.36 | 60.48 | | | | 60.48 m | |
| 10 | Taina Uppa (FIN) | X | 59.83 | X | | | | 59.83 m | |
| 11 | Felicia Țilea-Moldovan (ROM) | 59.24 | 58.24 | X | | | | 59.24 m | |
| 12 | Karen Forkel (GER) | 54.51 | 54.65 | X | | | | 54.65 m | |

== See also ==
- 2000 Women's Olympic Javelin Throw (Sydney)
