= Tiffany Lott-Hogan =

American heptathlete (born 1975)

Personal information
- Born: August 1, 1975 (age 51) Tucson, Arizona, U.S.
- Education: Brigham Young University
- Spouse: Brent Hogan
Medal record
Women's heptathlon
Representing United States
Pan American Games
| Gold medal – first place | 2003 Santo Domingo | Heptathlon |
Summer Universiade
| Gold medal – first place | 1999 Palma de Mallorca | Heptathlon |

Tiffany Lott-Hogan (born August 1, 1975) is an Olympic athlete representing the United States, competing in the heptathlon.

Lott-Hogan won the gold medal in the heptathlon at the 2003 Pan American Games, and won the NCAA championship in the event in 1997 and 1998 while attending Brigham Young University. She qualified for the 2004 Summer Olympics, and finished 20th in the heptathlon.

Lott-Hogan believed that women should compete in the decathlon at the Olympics rather than seven-event heptathlon. She scored 7577 points at a decathlon meeting in 2000 to set the American records in the event. She became an assistant coach for the Idaho State Bengals track and field team. She married Brent Hogan, an Idaho State Bengals football player.

== Stats ==
- Weight: 139 lbs (63 kg)
- Height: 5 ft 7.5 in (172 cm)
