= Athletics at the 1999 Summer Universiade =

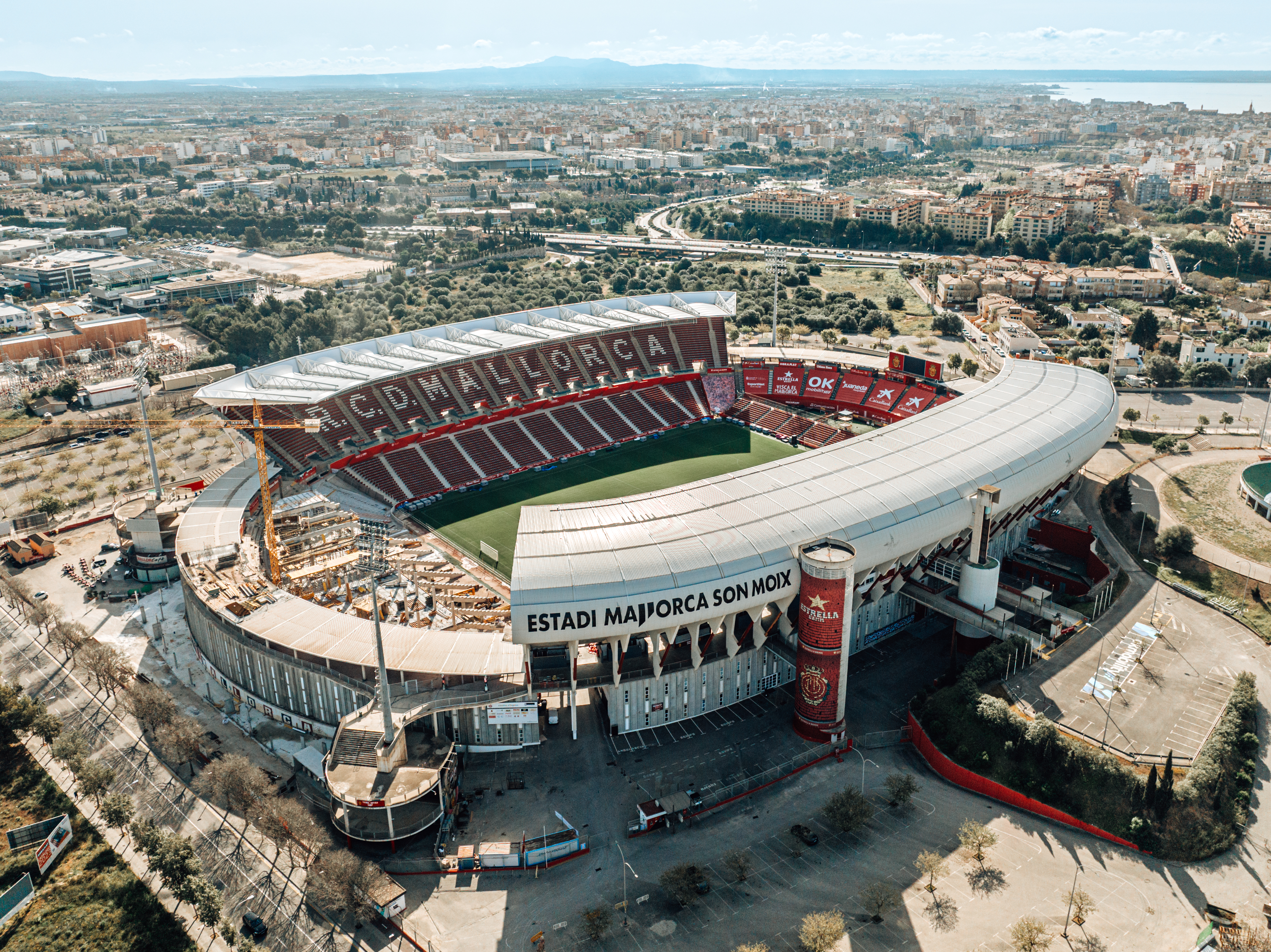
- Host stadium in 2023.
- Dates: 9–13 July
- Host city: Palma de Mallorca, Spain
- Venue: Estadio Son Moix
- Level: Senior
- Events: 45
- Participation: 998 athletes from 94 nations
- Records set: 5 UR's

The athletics competition at the 1999 Summer Universiade took place in the new Estadio Son Moix in Palma de Mallorca, Spain from 9–13 July 1999. Five Universiade records were set. A total of 23 men's and 22 women's events were contested (the programme remaining identical to the previous edition with steeplechase being for men only).

The United States topped the athletics medal table (as it did in 1997) with a total of 25 medals, twelve of them gold. Romania and Cuba were the next strongest nations, with six and five gold medals respectively. Romania was the only other nation to reach double figures in the medal tally. The host nation, Spain, won six medals. A total of 38 nations reached the medal table.

Among the returning 1997 champions, Cuban Yoelbi Quesada won the men's triple jump for a second time, while three women managed that feat: Olena Shekhovtsova (long jump), Olena Hovorova (triple jump) and Mihaela Melinte (hammer throw). Melinte also went on to win the global title at the 1999 World Championships in Athletics held the following month.

== Medal summary ==
=== Men ===
Event	Gold		Silver		Bronze	
100 metres (wind: -1.5 m/s)	André Domingos (BRA)	10.34	John Capel (USA)	10.35	Mathew Quinn (RSA)	10.42
200 metres (wind: -1.0 m/s)	Coby Miller (USA)	20.32	Patrick van Balkom (NED)	20.57	Christos Magos (GRE)	20.70
400 metres	Jerome Davis (USA)	44.91	Paston Coke (JAM)	45.15	Jopie van Oudtshoorn (RSA)	45.21
800 metres	Norberto Téllez (CUB)	1:46.11	André Bucher (SUI)	1:46.49	Derrick Peterson (USA)	1:46.75
1500 metres	Bernard Lagat (KEN)	3:40.99	Leszek Zblewski (POL)	3:41.81	Lorenzo Lazzari (ITA)	3:42.36
5000 metres	Serhiy Lebid (UKR)	13:37.52	Roberto García (ESP)	13:38.59	Naoki Mishiro (JPN)	13:39.10
10,000 metres	José Manuel Martínez (ESP)	29:37.56	Naoki Mishiro (JPN)	29:39.14	Pedro Trejo (ESP)	29:47.27
Half marathon	Marílson dos Santos (BRA)	1:04:05	Takayuki Nishida (JPN)	1:04:11	Oh Sung-Keun (KOR)	1:04:33
110 metres hurdles (wind: -0.1 m/s)	Terrence Trammell (USA)	13.44	Jonathan Nsenga (BEL)	13.51	Dawane Wallace (USA)	13.59
400 metres hurdles	Paweł Januszewski (POL)	48.64	Bayano Kamani (USA)	48.74	Marcel Schelbert (SUI)	48.77
3000 metres steeplechase	Giuseppe Maffei (ITA)	8:33.18	Khamis Seif Abdullah (QAT)	8:33.62	Joël Bourgeois (CAN)	8:34.20
4 × 100 metres relay	United States (USA); Kaaron Conwright; Terrence Trammell; Coby Miller; John Capel	38.55	South Africa (RSA); Morné Nagel; Bradley Agnew; Lee-Roy Newton; Mathew Quinn	39.08	Italy (ITA); Luca Verdecchia; Alessandro Orlandi; Alessandro Attene; Andrea Colombo	39.31
4 × 400 metres relay	United States (USA); Tony Berrian; Brandon Couts; Derrick Brew; Jerome Davis; Derrick Peterson	3:00.88	Great Britain (GBR); Richard Knowles; Geoff Dearman; Chris Rawlinson; Jared Deacon; John Stewart; Graham Beasley	3:03.95	Senegal (SEN); Ousmane Niang; Papa Serigne Diene; Jules Doumbya; Alpha Babacar Sall	3:05.45
20 kilometres walk	Alejandro López (MEX)	1:25:12	Lorenzo Civallero (ITA)	1:25:23	Daisuke Ikeshima (JPN)	1:26:01
High jump	Ben Challenger (GBR)	2.30	Mark Boswell (CAN)	2.30	Lee Jin-Taek (KOR)	2.28
Pole vault	Richard Spiegelburg (GER)	5.60	Štěpán Janáček (CZE)	5.60	Romain Mesnil (FRA)	5.55
Long jump	Aleksey Lukashevich (UKR)	8.16	Luis Méliz (CUB)	8.05	Erik Nijs (BEL)	7.99
Triple jump	Yoelbi Quesada (CUB)	17.40	Charles Friedek (GER)	17.20	Jiří Kuntoš (CZE)	16.97
Shot put	Andy Bloom (USA)	21.11 UR	Adam Nelson (USA)	20.64	Stevimir Ercegovac (CRO)	19.94
Discus throw	Frantz Kruger (RSA)	66.90	Andy Bloom (USA)	64.68	Doug Reynolds (USA)	63.65
Hammer throw	Zsolt Németh (HUN)	80.40	Christos Polychroniou (GRE)	79.83	Vladislav Piskunov (UKR)	78.61
Javelin throw	Ēriks Rags (LAT)	83.78	Gregor Högler (AUT)	82.63	Isbel Luaces (CUB)	82.18
Decathlon	Raúl Duany (CUB)	8050	Stephen Moore (USA)	8028	Benjamin Jensen (DEN)	7982

=== Women ===
Event	Gold		Silver		Bronze	
100 metres (wind: +1.2 m/s)	Angela Williams (USA)	11.19	Katia Benth (FRA)	11.23	Virgen Benavides (CUB)	11.25
200 metres (wind: -1.1 m/s)	Kim Gevaert (BEL)	23.10	Zuzanna Radecka (POL)	23.14	Nanceen Perry (USA)	23.27
400 metres	Ionela Târlea (ROM)	49.88 UR	Miki Barber (USA)	51.03	Doris Jacob (NGR)	51.04
800 metres	Yuliya Taranova (RUS)	1:59.63	Brigita Langerholc (SLO)	1:59.87	Elena Buhăianu (ROM)	2:00.26
1500 metres	Elena Buhăianu (ROM)	4:13.04	Luminița Gogîrlea (ROM)	4:14.61	Ana Amelia Menéndez (ESP)	4:14.95
5000 metres	Rie Ueno (JPN)	15:51.24	Ana Dias (POR)	15:53.23	Cristina Casandra (ROM)	16:03.18
10,000 metres	Leigh Daniel (USA)	32:58.80	Yuri Kano (JPN)	33:16.41	Annemette Jensen (DEN)	33:36.11
Half marathon	Rosaria Console (ITA)	1:14:14	Yukiko Akaba (JPN)	1:14:35	Marta Fernández (ESP)	1:14:52
100 metres hurdles (wind: -2.8 m/s)	Andria King (USA)	13.04	Yolanda McCray (USA)	13.08	Diane Allahgreen (GBR)	13.17
400 metres hurdles	Daimí Pernía (CUB)	53.95 UR	Joanna Hayes (USA)	54.57	Ulrike Urbansky (GER)	54.93
4 × 100 metres relay	United States (USA); Angela Williams; Torri Edwards; LaKeisha Backus; Nanceen Perry	43.49	Poland (POL); Agnieszka Rysiukiewicz; Irena Sznajder; Monika Borejza; Zuzanna Radecka	43.74	Germany (GER); Shanta Ghosh; Kirsten Bolm; Andrea Bornscheuer; Nicole Mahrarens	43.96
4 × 400 metres relay	United States (USA); Yolanda Brown-Moore; Yulanda Nelson; Mikele Barber; Suziann Reid	3:27.97	Russia (RUS); Natalya Khrushchelyova; Yuliya Taranova; Olga Salnykova; Anna Tkatch	3:30.54	Great Britain (GBR); Tasha Danvers; Dawn Higgins; Lee McConnell; Sinead Dudgeon	3:32.25
10 kilometres walk	Claudia Iovan (ROM)	44:22	Rossella Giordano (ITA)	44:39	Valentyna Savchuk (UKR)	45:23
High jump	Monica Iagar (ROM)	1.95	Svetlana Lapina (RUS)	1.93	Solange Witteveen (ARG)	1.93
Pole vault	Pavla Hamácková (CZE)	4.25	Monique de Wilt (NED)	4.20	Dana Cervantes (ESP)	4.10
Long jump	Olena Shekhovtsova (UKR)	6.92	Adrien Sawyer (USA)	6.61	Maurren Maggi (BRA)	6.58
Triple jump	Olena Hovorova (UKR)	14.99w	Wu Lingmei (CHN)	14.55w	Adelina Gavrilă (ROM)	14.33
Shot put	Yumileidi Cumbá (CUB)	18.70	Song Feina (CHN)	18.28	Elisângela Adriano (BRA)	18.17
Discus throw	Nicoleta Grasu (ROM)	65.21	Joanna Wiśniewska (POL)	63.97	Styliani Tsikouna (GRE)	61.59
Hammer throw	Mihaela Melinte (ROM)	74.24	Lyudmila Gubkina (BLR)	68.27	Manuela Montebrun (FRA)	68.11
Javelin throw	Ewa Rybak (POL)	60.76 UR	Evfemija Štorga (SLO)	59.30	Yanuris la Motaña (CUB)	59.08
Heptathlon	Tiffany Lott (USA)	5959	Katerina Nekolná (CZE)	5900	Clare Thompson (AUS)	5766

== Medal table ==
* Host nation (Spain)

Rank	Nation	Gold	Silver	Bronze	Total
1	United States (USA)	12	9	4	25
2	Romania (ROM)	6	1	3	10
3	Cuba (CUB)	5	1	3	9
4	Ukraine (UKR)	4	0	2	6
5	Poland (POL)	2	4	0	6
6	Italy (ITA)	2	2	2	6
7	Brazil (BRA)	2	0	3	5
8	Japan (JPN)	1	4	2	7
9	Czech Republic (CZE)	1	2	1	4
10	Russia (RUS)	1	2	0	3
11	Spain (ESP)*	1	1	4	6
12	Germany (GER)	1	1	2	4
12	Great Britain (GBR)	1	1	2	4
12	South Africa (RSA)	1	1	2	4
15	Belgium (BEL)	1	1	1	3
16	Hungary (HUN)	1	0	0	1
16	Kenya (KEN)	1	0	0	1
16	Latvia (LAT)	1	0	0	1
16	Mexico (MEX)	1	0	0	1
20	China (CHN)	0	2	0	2
20	Netherlands (NED)	0	2	0	2
20	Slovenia (SLO)	0	2	0	2
23	France (FRA)	0	1	2	3
24	Canada (CAN)	0	1	1	2
24	Greece (GRE)	0	1	1	2
24	Switzerland (SUI)	0	1	1	2
27	Austria (AUT)	0	1	0	1
27	Belarus (BLR)	0	1	0	1
27	Jamaica (JAM)	0	1	0	1
27	Portugal (POR)	0	1	0	1
27	Qatar (QAT)	0	1	0	1
32	Denmark (DEN)	0	0	2	2
32	South Korea (KOR)	0	0	2	2
34	Argentina (ARG)	0	0	1	1
34	Australia (AUS)	0	0	1	1
34	Croatia (CRO)	0	0	1	1
34	Nigeria (NGR)	0	0	1	1
34	Senegal (SEN)	0	0	1	1
Totals (38 entries)		45	45	45	135

== Participating nations ==
- Albania (1)
- Algeria (12)
- Argentina (5)
- Australia (23)
- Austria (3)
- Bangladesh (2)
- Barbados (2)
- Belarus (9)
- Belgium (8)
- Botswana (8)
- Brazil (15)
- British Virgin Islands (1)
- Bulgaria (7)
- Burkina Faso (2)
- Burundi (1)
- Cameroon (2)
- Canada (30)
- Central African Republic (1)
- Chad (2)
- Chile (16)
- China (12)
- Chinese Taipei (6)
- Costa Rica (5)
- Colombia (3)
- Croatia (7)
- Cuba (17)
- Cyprus (4)
- Czech Republic (11)
- Denmark (20)
- Estonia (11)
- Finland (9)
- France (22)
- Gabon (2)
- Germany (27)
- Great Britain (33)
- Greece (10)
- Guatemala (2)
- Guinea (1)
- Hong Kong (6)
- Hungary (14)
- India (1)
- Indonesia (2)
- Iraq (1)
- Ireland (14)
- Israel (4)
- Italy (37)
- Jamaica (4)
- Japan (24)
- Kenya (6)
- Kyrgyzstan (3)
- Latvia (6)
- Lebanon (5)
- Macau (4)
- Malawi (2)
- Malaysia (6)
- Malta (6)
- Mexico (13)
- Moldova (4)
- Morocco (14)
- Namibia (3)
- Nepal (2)
- Netherlands (13)
- New Zealand (15)
- Nicaragua (1)
- Nigeria (18)
- Norway (13)
- Papua New Guinea (2)
- Peru (12)
- Poland (22)
- Portugal (11)
- Puerto Rico (15)
- Qatar (4)
- Romania (19)
- Russia (24)
- Rwanda (1)
- El Salvador (2)
- São Tomé and Príncipe (1)
- Senegal (10)
- Slovakia (4)
- Slovenia (20)
- South Africa (33)
- South Korea (9)
- Spain (48)
- Sudan (2)
- Swaziland (2)
- Sweden (29)
- Switzerland (12)
- Turkey (5)
- Uganda (5)
- Ukraine (24)
- United States (83)
- Vietnam (2)
- Zimbabwe (1)
- Yugoslavia (3)

== See also ==
- 1999 in the sport of athletics
- FISU World University Games
- University and college sport
