= Mikaela Ingberg =

Finnish javelin thrower (born 1974)

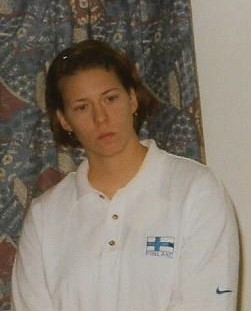
- Mikaela Ingberg (1998)

Personal information
- Born: 29 July 1974 (age 52) Vaasa, Finland

Sport
- Sport: Track and field
Medal record
Representing Finland
World Championships
Bronze medal – third place	1995 Gothenburg	Javelin throw
European Championships
Bronze medal – third place	1998 Budapest	Javelin throw
Bronze medal – third place	2002 Munich	Javelin throw

Mikaela Johanna Emilia Ingberg (born 29 July 1974) is a Finnish javelin thrower. Her personal best throw is 64.03 metres, achieved in September 2000 in Berlin. She was nicknamed "Mikke" during her career.

Her achievements include bronze medals at the 1995 World Championships, 1998 and 2002 European Championships.

In the annual match against Sweden in Helsinki's Olympic Stadium in 2008, Mikaela Ingberg, then Finland's team captain, won the Javelin Throw with her last throw of 59.51 meters. She has been coached by Tapio Korjus.

Her javelin throwing career ended in 2010 due to a sudden injury. After her sports career, Ingberg has worked as an expert for the Finnish Olympic Committee.

== Achievements ==
Year	Competition	Venue	Position	Notes
Representing Finland
1993	European Junior Championships	San Sebastián, Spain	1st	56.64 m
1994	European Championships	Helsinki, Finland	16th (q)	54.26 m
1995	World Championships	Gothenburg, Sweden	3rd	65.16 m
1996	Olympic Games	Atlanta, United States	7th	61.52 m
1997	World Championships	Athens, Greece	4th	66.00 m
1998	European Championships	Budapest, Hungary	3rd	64.92 m
1998	World Cup	Johannesburg, South Africa	3rd	64.24 m
1999	World Championships	Seville, Spain	9th	60.48 m
2000	Olympic Games	Sydney, Australia	9th	58.56 m
2000	IAAF Grand Prix Final	Doha, Qatar	7th	62.57 m
2001	World Championships	Edmonton, Canada	6th	61.94 m
2002	European Championships	Munich, Germany	3rd	63.50 m
2002	World Cup	Madrid, Spain	3rd	60.08 m
2002	IAAF Grand Prix Final	Paris, France	2nd	62.34 m
2003	World Championships	Paris, France	4th	62.20 m
2003	World Athletics Final	Monte Carlo, Monaco	5th	61.29 m
2004	Olympic Games	Athens, Greece	13th (q)	60.80 m
2005	World Championships	Helsinki, Finland	9th	57.54 m
2006	European Championships	Gothenburg, Sweden	10th	56.70 m
2008	Olympic Games	Beijing, China	17th (q)	58.82 m
2009	World Championships	Berlin, Germany	14th (q)	57.88 m
