= Claudia Coslovich =

Italian javelin thrower (born 1972)

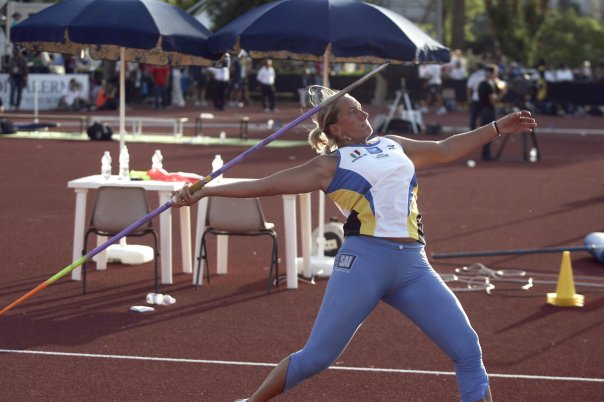

Personal information
- Nationality: Italian
- Born: 26 April 1972 (age 54) Trieste, Italy
- Height: 1.70 m (5 ft 7 in)
- Weight: 74 kg (163 lb)

Sport
- Country: Italy
- Sport: Athletics
- Event: Javelin throw
- Club: SAI Fondiaria

Achievements and titles
- Personal best: Javelin throw 65.30 m (2000)
Medal record
Mediterranean Games
Gold medal – first place	2001 Tunis	Javelin Throw
Silver medal – second place	1997 Bari	Javelin Throw
European Cup
Bronze medal – third place	2001 Bremen	Javelin Throw
Bronze medal – third place	2003 Florence	Javelin Throw
European Cup Winter Throwing
Gold medal – first place	2002 Pula	Javelin Throw
Silver medal – second place	2001 Nice	Javelin Throw

Claudia Coslovich (Slovene: Klaudia Kozlovič; born 26 April 1972 in Trieste) is a former Italian athlete who specialized in the javelin throw.

Her personal best was 65.30 metres, achieved in June 2000 in Ljubljana. She is a member of the Slovene ethnic minority of Friuli-Venezia Giulia.

She is engaged to the hammer thrower Nicola Vizzoni. Coslovich is now coach of the Italian National Team for the event of javelin throw, and she is the Italian record holder.

== Achievements ==
Year	Competition	Venue	Position	Notes
1994	European Championships	Helsinki, Finland	19th (q)	53.10 m
1997	Mediterranean Games	Bari, Italy	2nd	57.16 m
1998	European Championships	Budapest, Hungary	7th	60.73 m
2000	Olympic Games	Sydney, Australia	12th	56.74 m
2001	World Championships	Edmonton, Canada	11th	57.27 m
2001	Mediterranean Games	Radès, Tunisia	1st	62.02 m
2003	World Championships	Paris, France	7th	59.64 m
2003	World Athletics Final	Monte Carlo, Monaco	7th	58.61 m
2004	Olympic Games	Athens, Greece	14th	60.58 m
2005	World Championships	Helsinki, Finland	19th	55.78 m
2006	European Championships	Gothenburg, Sweden	23rd	54.44 m

== National titles ==
She has won twenty individual national championship titles, an Italian all-time record for a woman.

- 13 wins in the javelin throw (11 consecutively from 1993 to 2003 and 2007, 2008)
- 7 wins in the javelin throw at the Italian Winter Throwing Championships (1995, 1998, 2000, 2001, 2002, 2004, 2007)

== See also ==
- Italian records in athletics
- Italian all-time lists - Javelin throw
