= Mirela Maniani =

Greek javelin thrower (born 1976)

Personal information
- Nationality: Albanian / Greek
- Born: Mirela Manjani; 21 December 1976 (age 49) Durrës, Albania
- Spouses: Georgios Tzelilis (m. 1997; div. 2002) Giannis Skoutelas (m. 2004; div. 2006) Giannis Giannoulis (m. 2009; div. 2014)
- Military career
- Allegiance: Greece
- Branch: Hellenic Navy
- Service years: 1999–unknown

Achievements and titles
- Personal bests: NR 67.51 m (2000)
Medal record
Representing Greece
Olympic Games
Silver medal – second place	2000 Sydney	Javelin
Bronze medal – third place	2004 Athens	Javelin
World Championships
Gold medal – first place	1999 Seville	Javelin
Gold medal – first place	2003 Paris	Javelin
Silver medal – second place	2001 Edmonton	Javelin
European Championships
Gold medal – first place	2002 Munich	Javelin
- Updated on 18 May 2015

Mirela Maniani (Greek: Μιρέλα Μανιάνι, [miˈrela maˈɲani], born 21 December 1976) is a Greek retired track and field athlete who competed in the javelin throw. She was named the Greek Female Athlete of the Year for 2003.

== Life and athletic achievements ==
=== Albania ===
Maniani was born as Mirela Manjani on 21 December 1976 in Durrës, Albania. In 1996, at the University of Alabama she set a new Albanian national record at 62.46 m (as of 2017, she still holds the national record of Albania). She represented Albania at the 1996 Summer Olympics in Atlanta, USA and ranked 24th overall. During the competition she was also Albania's flag bearer.

=== Greece ===
After marrying a Greek citizen, the weightlifter Georgios Tzelilis, she received Greek citizenship and represented Greece at the 1997 World Championships in Athletics in Athens. Her first major success came in 1999 in Seville, where she won the gold medal at the World Championships with a throw of 67.09 m. Her performance was considered as a world record, as a new type of javelin had been introduced in 1999. At the 2000 Summer Olympics she won the silver medal with a personal best of 67.51 m. She also won the bronze medal in 2004. Maniani is also a European champion and double world champion. Her personal best throw of 67.51 metres is the current Greek record.

Maniani joined the Hellenic Navy in 1999.

== Personal life ==
Mirela Maniani was married to the weightlifter Georgios Tzelilis in 1997, and became a Greek citizen. She was known as Mirela Maniani-Tzelili until 2002, when she divorced Tzelilis. Maniani has one daughter from her third wedding with the Greek basketball player, Giannis Giannoulis.

== International competitions ==
Year	Competition	Venue	Position	Notes
Representing Albania
1994	World Junior Championships	Lisbon, Portugal	8th	52.22 m (old spec.)
1994	European Championships	Helsinki, Finland	22nd (q)	49.96 m (old spec.)
1995	World Championships	Gothenburg, Sweden	12th	55.56 m
1995	European Junior Championships	Nyíregyháza, Hungary	2nd	59.36 m (old spec.)
1996	Olympic Games	Atlanta, United States	24th (q)	55.64 m
Representing Greece
1997	World Championships	Athens, Greece	11th	61.02 m
1998	European Championships	Budapest, Hungary	9th	58.65 m
1999	World Championships	Seville, Spain	1st	67.09 m CR
2000	Olympic Games	Sydney, Australia	2nd	67.51 m =NR
2001	World Championships	Edmonton, Canada	2nd	65.78 m
2002	European Championships	Munich, Germany	1st	67.47 m CR
2003	World Championships	Paris, France	1st	66.52 m WL
2004	Olympic Games	Athens, Greece	3rd	64.29 m

Sporting positions
Preceded by Osleidys Menéndez	Women's Javelin Best Year Performance; 2002–2003	Succeeded by Osleidys Menéndez
Olympic Games
Preceded by Kristo Robo	Flagbearer for Albania; Atlanta 1996	Succeeded by Ilirian Suli
