= 2000 IAAF Grand Prix Final =

- Host city: Doha, Qatar
- Events: 18
- Dates: 5 October
- Main venue: Khalifa International Stadium

The 2000 IAAF Grand Prix Final was the sixteenth edition of the season-ending competition for the IAAF Grand Prix track and field circuit, organised by the International Association of Athletics Federations. It was held on 5 October at the Khalifa International Stadium in Doha, Qatar. It was the first and only time that the event was held outside of September, due in part to Qatar's hot desert climate.

Angelo Taylor (400 metres hurdles) and Trine Hattestad (javelin throw) were the overall points winners of the tournament. A total of 18 athletics events were contested, ten for men and eight for women.

== Medal summary ==
=== Men ===
Event	Gold		Silver		Bronze	
Overall	Angelo Taylor (USA)	101	Yuriy Bilonog (UKR)	94	Adam Nelson (USA)	93
100 metres	Darren Campbell (GBR)	10.25	Tim Montgomery (USA)	10.27	Greg Saddler (USA)	10.41
400 metres	Mark Richardson (GBR)	45.20	Sanderlei Parrela (BRA)	45.25	Antonio Pettigrew (USA)	45.37
1500 metres	Noah Ngeny (KEN)	3:36.62	Bernard Lagat (KEN)	3:36.88	Kevin Sullivan (CAN)	3:37.16
3000 metres	Luke Kipkosgei (KEN)	7:46.21	Ali Saïdi Sief (ALG)	7:47.16	Sammy Kipketer (KEN)	7:47.31
400 m hurdles	Angelo Taylor (USA)	48.14	Hadi Soua'an Al-Somaily (KSA)	48.18	Samuel Matete (ZAM)	48.71
High jump	Vyacheslav Voronin (RUS)	2.32 m	Nathan Leeper (USA)	2.30 m	Dragutin Topić (YUG)	2.25 m
Pole vault	Tim Lobinger (GER)	5.70 m	Nick Hysong (USA)	5.60 m	Okkert Brits (RSA)	5.60 m
Triple jump	Jonathan Edwards (GBR)	17.12 m	Rostislav Dimitrov (BUL)	17.11 m	Larry Achike (GBR)	16.49 m
Shot put	Andy Bloom (USA)	21.82 m	Adam Nelson (USA)	21.66 m	John Godina (USA)	21.51 m
Hammer throw	Andrey Skvaruk (UKR)	81.43 m	Koji Murofushi (JPN)	80.32 m	Karsten Kobs (GER)	79.22 m

=== Women ===
Event	Gold		Silver		Bronze	
Overall	Trine Hattestad (NOR)	110	Marion Jones (USA)	104	Gail Devers (USA)	104
100 metres	Marion Jones (USA)	11.00	Chryste Gaines (USA)	11.09	Savatheda Fynes (BAH)	11.10
400 metres	Lorraine Graham (JAM)	50.21	Falilat Ogunkoya (NGR)	50.61	Charity Opara (NGR)	50.85
1500 metres	Violeta Szekely (ROM)	4:15.63	Kutre Dulecha (ETH)	4:15.75	Nouria Mérah-Benida (ALG)	4:15.85
3000 metres	Sonia O'Sullivan (IRL)	8:52.01	Leah Malot (KEN)	8:52.73	Sally Barsosio (KEN)	8:52.99
100 m hurdles	Gail Devers (USA)	12.85	Glory Alozie (NGR)	12.94	Delloreen Ennis-London (JAM)	12.96
Long jump	Heike Drechsler (GER)	7.07w m	Dawn Burrell (USA)	6.99w m	Niurka Montalvo (ESP)	6.87 m
Discus throw	Franka Dietzsch (GER)	65.41 m	Ellina Zvereva (BLR)	63.96 m	Beatrice Faumuina (NZL)	63.03 m
Javelin throw	Sonia Bicet (CUB)	65.87 m	Trine Hattestad (NOR)	65.86 m	Osleidys Menéndez (CUB)	65.79 m
