= 1994 European Athletics Championships – Women's javelin throw =

Women's javelin throw at the European Athletics Championships

These are the official results of the Women’s javelin throw event at the 1994 European Championships in Helsinki, Finland, held at Helsinki Olympic Stadium on 11 and 12 August 1994. There were a total number of 22 participating athletes. All results were made with a rough surfaced javelin (old design). The qualification mark was set at 61.00 metres (200.13 ft).

Trine Hattestad of Norway won the gold medal with a throw of 68.00 metres (223.10 ft).

== Medalists ==
Gold	Trine Hattestad; Norway (NOR)
Silver	Karen Forkel; Germany (GER)
Bronze	Felicia Ţilea; Romania (ROM)

== Abbreviations ==
- All results shown are in metres

Q	automatic qualification
q	qualification by rank
DNS	did not start
NM	no mark
WR	world record
AR	area record
NR	national record
PB	personal best
SB	season best

== Records ==
Standing records prior to the 1994 European Athletics Championships
World Record	Petra Felke (GDR)	80.00 m	September 9, 1988	Potsdam, East Germany
Event Record	Fatima Whitbread (GBR)	77.44 m	August 28, 1986	Stuttgart, West Germany

== Qualification ==
=== Group A ===
Rank	Overall	Athlete	Attempts			Distance	Notes
Rank	Overall	Athlete	1	2	3	Distance	Notes
1	2	Karen Forkel (GER)				64.28 m	
2	3	Felicia Ţilea (ROM)				62.84 m	
3	4	Claudia Isăilă (ROM)				60.16 m	
4	5	Jette Jeppesen (DEN)				59.64 m	
5	6	Antoaneta Selenska (BUL)				59.26 m	
6	7	Kinga Zsigmond (HUN)				58.18 m	
7	9	Silke Gast (GER)				56.80 m	
8	13	Nadine Auzeil (FRA)				55.12 m	
9	14	Natalya Shikolenko (BLR)				55.08 m	
10	21	Shelley Holroyd (GBR)				51.26 m	
11	22	Mirela Manjani (ALB)				49.96 m	

=== Group B ===
Rank	Overall	Athlete	Attempts			Distance	Notes
Rank	Overall	Athlete	1	2	3	Distance	Notes
1	1	Trine Hattestad (NOR)				64.46 m	
2	8	Rita Ramanauskaitė (LTU)				57.34 m	
3	10	Tanja Damaske (GER)				56.14 m	
4	11	Nathalie Teppe (FRA)				55.72 m	
5	12	Taina Uppa (FIN)				55.66 m	
6	15	Yekaterina Ivakina (RUS)				54.86 m	
7	16	Mikaela Ingberg (FIN)				54.26 m	
8	17	Sharon Gibson (GBR)				53.82 m	
9	18	Päivi Alafrantti (FIN)				53.28 m	
10	19	Claudia Coslovich (ITA)				53.10 m	
11	20	Martine Bègue (FRA)				53.06 m	

== Final ==
Rank	Athlete	Attempts						Distance	Note
Rank	Athlete	1	2	3	4	5	6	Distance	Note
1st place, gold medalist(s)	Trine Hattestad (NOR)	65.18	63.66	66.42	65.12	X	68.00	68.00 m	
2nd place, silver medalist(s)	Karen Forkel (GER)	65.26	59.68	X	X	59.28	66.10	66.10 m	
3rd place, bronze medalist(s)	Felicia Ţilea (ROM)	64.34	62.40	X	X	59.78	X	64.34 m	
4	Silke Gast (GER)							62.90 m	
5	Rita Ramanauskaitė (LTU)							61.54 m	
6	Tanja Damaske (GER)							61.32 m	
7	Kinga Zsigmond (HUN)							59.74 m	
8	Antoaneta Selenska (BUL)							57.76 m	
9	Nathalie Teppe (FRA)							57.52 m	
10	Taina Uppa (FIN)							57.20 m	
11	Claudia Isăilă (ROM)							56.92 m	
12	Jette Jeppesen (DEN)							56.06 m	

== Participation ==
According to an unofficial count, 22 athletes from 14 countries participated in the event.

- Albania (1)
- Belarus (1)
- Bulgaria (1)
- Denmark (1)
- Finland (3)
- France (3)
- Germany (3)
- Hungary (1)
- Italy (1)
- Lithuania (1)
- Norway (1)
- Romania (2)
- Russia (1)
- United Kingdom (2)

== See also ==
- 1991 Women's World Championships Javelin Throw (Tokyo)
- 1992 Women's Olympic Javelin Throw (Barcelona)
- 1993 Women's World Championships Javelin Throw (Stuttgart)
- 1995 Women's World Championships Javelin Throw (Gothenburg)
- 1996 Women's Olympic Javelin Throw (Atlanta)
- 1997 Women's World Championships Javelin Throw (Athens)
