= 1991 World Championships in Athletics – Women's javelin throw =

These are the official results of the Women's Javelin Throw event at the 1991 World Championships in Tokyo, Japan. There were a total of 31 participating athletes, with the final held on Sunday September 1, 1991. All results were made with a rough surfaced javelin.

The winning margin was 10 cm which as of 2024 remains the narrowest winning margin in the women's javelin throw at these championships.

== Medalists ==
Gold	Xu Demei; PR China (CHN)
Silver	Petra Felke-Meier; Germany (GER)
Bronze	Silke Renk; Germany (GER)

== Schedule ==
- All times are Japan Standard Time (UTC+9)

Qualification Round
Group A	Group B
31.08.1991 – 16:30h	31.08.1991 – 18:00h
Final Round
01.09.1991 – 16:00h

== Abbreviations ==
- All results shown are in metres

Q	automatic qualification
q	qualification by rank
DNS	did not start
NM	no mark
WR	world record
AR	area record
NR	national record
PB	personal best
SB	season best

== Records ==
Standing records prior to the 1991 World Athletics Championships
World Record	Petra Felke-Meier (GDR)	80.00 m	September 9, 1988	Potsdam, East Germany
Event Record	Fatima Whitbread (GBR)	76.64 m	September 6, 1987	Rome, Italy
Season Best	Trine Hattestad (NOR)	71.44 m	August 3, 1991	Fana, Norway

== Qualification ==
- Held on Saturday 1991-08-31

RANK	GROUP A	DISTANCE
1.	Karen Forkel (GER)	68.14 m
2.	Xu Demei (CHN)	65.44 m
3.	Päivi Alafrantti (FIN)	64.38 m
4.	Anna Verouli (GRE)	63.02 m
5.	Natalya Shikolenko (URS)	62.08 m
6.	Heli Rantanen (FIN)	61.30 m
7.	Antoaneta Todorova (BUL)	57.42 m
8.	Sharon Gibson (GBR)	56.64 m
9.	Donna Mayhew (USA)	56.34 m
10.	Katalin Hartai (HUN)	55.68 m
11.	Laverne Eve (BAH)	55.14 m
12.	Akiko Miyajima (JPN)	52.86 m
13.	Matilda Kisava (TAN)	52.60 m
14.	Sueli dos Santos (BRA)	51.20 m
—	Nadine Schoellkopf-Auzeil (FRA)	NM
—	Isel López (CUB)	NM

RANK	GROUP B	DISTANCE
1.	Petra Felke-Meier (GER)	67.24 m
2.	Trine Solberg-Hattestad (NOR)	66.92 m
3.	Silke Renk (GER)	65.24 m
4.	Dulce García (CUB)	62.18 m
5.	Louise McPaul (AUS)	61.08 m
6.	Natalya Cherniyenko (URS)	60.90 m
7.	Karin Smith (USA)	60.34 m
8.	Genowefa Patla (POL)	60.18 m
9.	Tiina Lillak (FIN)	58.42 m
10.	Paula Berry (USA)	57.94 m
11.	Irina Kostyuchenkova (URS)	57.60 m
12.	Sun Fei (CHN)	55.04 m
13.	Kirsten Smith (NZL)	53.98 m
14.	Íris Grönfeldt (ISL)	53.92 m
15.	Marieta Riera (VEN)	50.62 m

== Final ==
Rank	Athlete	Attempts						Distance
Rank	Athlete	1	2	3	4	5	6	Distance
1st place, gold medalist(s)	Xu Demei (CHN)							68.78 m
2nd place, silver medalist(s)	Petra Felke-Meier (GER)							68.68 m
3rd place, bronze medalist(s)	Silke Renk (GER)							66.80 m
4	Natalya Cherniyenko (URS)							65.22 m
5	Trine Solberg-Hattestad (NOR)							63.36 m
6	Louise McPaul (AUS)							62.34 m
7	Dulce García (CUB)							62.68 m
8	Päivi Alafrantti (FIN)							62.26 m
9	Heli Rantanen (FIN)							60.96 m
10	Anna Verouli (GRE)							59.12 m
11	Natalya Shikolenko (URS)							58.82 m
12	Karen Forkel (GER)							57.90 m

== See also ==
- 1988 Women's Olympic Javelin Throw (Seoul)
- 1990 Women's European Championships Javelin Throw (Split)
- 1992 Women's Olympic Javelin Throw (Barcelona)
- 1994 Women's European Championships Javelin Throw (Helsinki)
