= 1995 World Championships in Athletics – Women's javelin throw =

These are the official results of the Women's Javelin Throw event at the 1995 World Championships in Gothenburg, Sweden. There were a total number of 31 participating athletes, with the final held on Tuesday August 8, 1995. All results were made with a rough surfaced javelin (old design).

== Medalists ==
Gold	Natalya Shikolenko; Belarus (BLR)
Silver	Felicia Țilea-Moldovan; Romania (ROM)
Bronze	Mikaela Ingberg; Finland (FIN)

== Schedule ==
- All times are Central European Time (UTC+1)

Qualification Round
Group A	Group B
06.08.1995 – 09:45h	06.08.1995 – 11:15h
Final Round
08.08.1995 – 17:35h

== Abbreviations ==
- All results shown are in metres

Q	automatic qualification
q	qualification by rank
DNS	did not start
NM	no mark
WR	world record
AR	area record
NR	national record
PB	personal best
SB	season best

== Records ==
Standing records prior to the 1995 World Athletics Championships
World Record	Petra Felke-Meier (GDR)	80.00 m	September 9, 1988	Potsdam, East Germany
Event Record	Fatima Whitbread (GBR)	76.64 m	September 6, 1987	Rome, Italy
Season Best	Steffi Nerius (GER)	68.42 m	June 25, 1995	Villeneuve d'Ascq, France

== Qualification ==
- Held on Sunday 1995-08-06

RANK	GROUP A	DISTANCE
1.	Natalya Shikolenko (BLR)	65.64 m
2.	Tanja Damaske (GER)	62.82 m
3.	Yekaterina Krasnikova (RUS)	61.52 m
4.	Renata Strašek (SLO)	60.26 m
5.	Isel Lopez (CUB)	60.04 m
6.	Joanna Stone (AUS)	59.52 m
7.	Silke Renk (GER)	58.86 m
8.	Kinga Zsigmond (HUN)	57.86 m
9.	Tang Lishuang (CHN)	56.98 m
10.	Claudia Isaila (ROM)	55.84 m
11.	Taina Uppa (FIN)	54.38 m
12.	Rita Ramanauskaitė (LTU)	54.14 m
13.	Donna Mayhew (USA)	53.10 m
14.	Aysel Taş (TUR)	49.20 m
15.	Maka Obolashvili (GEO)	43.98 m

RANK	GROUP B	DISTANCE
1.	Steffi Nerius (GER)	62.62 m
2.	Mirela Manjani-Tzelili (ALB)	62.40 m
3.	Jette Jeppesen (DEN)	61.96 m
4.	Felicia Țilea-Moldovan (ROM)	61.52 m
5.	Mikaela Ingberg (FIN)	60.72 m
6.	Heli Rantanen (FIN)	60.34 m
7.	Louise McPaul (AUS)	59.30 m
8.	Laverne Eve (BAH)	58.78 m
9.	Xiomara Rivero (CUB)	58.32 m
10.	Nikola Tomecková (CZE)	57.98 m
11.	Nadine Auzeil-Schoellkopf (FRA)	56.80 m
12.	Oksana Ovchinnikova (RUS)	56.74 m
13.	Nicole Carroll (USA)	55.32 m
14.	Agnes Preisinger (HUN)	54.00 m
15.	Kate Farrow (AUS)	49.24 m
16.	Ketut Mudiani (INA)	40.92 m

== Final ==
Rank	Athlete	Attempts						Distance
Rank	Athlete	1	2	3	4	5	6	Distance
1st place, gold medalist(s)	Natalya Shikolenko (BLR)	66.48	63.58	X	X	65.46	67.56	67.56 m
2nd place, silver medalist(s)	Felicia Ţilea-Moldovan (ROM)	62.34	60.98	59.64	65.22	X	X	65.22 m
3rd place, bronze medalist(s)	Mikaela Ingberg (FIN)	61.82	59.54	60.12	65.16	X	X	65.16 m
4	Heli Rantanen (FIN)	55.44	59.66	X	59.10	62.96	65.04	65.04 m
5	Joanna Stone (AUS)	59.14	X	61.46	58.50	57.80	63.74	63.74 m
6	Tanja Damaske (GER)	62.32	X	60.42	X	59.64	X	62.32 m
7	Isel Lopez (CUB)	54.30	X	60.80	X	X	X	60.80 m
8	Yekaterina Krasnikova (RUS)	59.82	56.06	58.64	55.28	X	X	59.82 m
9	Renata Strašek (SLO)	X	59.10	X				59.10 m
10	Jette Jeppesen (DEN)	58.48	X	58.84				58.84 m
11	Steffi Nerius (GER)	56.50	52.98	55.28				56.50 m
12	Mirela Manjani-Tzelili (ALB)	X	55.56	55.50				55.56 m

== See also ==
- 1996 Women's Olympic Javelin Throw
