= 1997 World Championships in Athletics – Women's javelin throw =

These are the official results of the Women's Javelin Throw event at the 1997 World Championships in Athens, Greece. There were a total number of 29 participating athletes, with the final held on Saturday August 9, 1997. All results were made with a rough surfaced javelin (old design).

== Medalists ==
| Gold | Trine Hattestad; Norway (NOR) |
| Silver | Joanna Stone; Australia (AUS) |
| Bronze | Tanja Damaske; Germany (GER) |

== Schedule ==
- All times are Eastern European Time (UTC+2)

Qualification Round
| Group A | Group B |
|---|---|
| 07.08.1997 – 08:30h | 07.08.1997 – 10:10h |
Final Round
09.08.1997 – 19:10h

== Abbreviations ==
- All results shown are in metres

| Q | automatic qualification |
| q | qualification by rank |
| DNS | did not start |
| NM | no mark |
| WR | world record |
| AR | area record |
| NR | national record |
| PB | personal best |
| SB | season best |

== Records ==
Standing records prior to the 1997 World Athletics Championships
| World Record | Petra Felke-Meier (GDR) | 80.00 m | September 9, 1988 | Potsdam, East Germany |
| Event Record | Fatima Whitbread (GBR) | 76.64 m | September 6, 1987 | Rome, Italy |
| Season Best | Trine Hattestad (NOR) | 69.66 m | June 18, 1997 | Helsinki, Finland |

== Qualification ==
- Held on Thursday 1997-08-07

| RANK | GROUP A | DISTANCE |
|---|---|---|
| 1. | Trine Hattestad (NOR) | 66.12 m |
| 2. | Heli Rantanen (FIN) | 64.46 m |
| 3. | Mirela Maniani-Tzelili (GRE) | 63.50 m |
| 4. | Felicia Țilea-Moldovan (ROM) | 63.06 m |
| 5. | Oksana Ovchinnikova (RUS) | 61.58 m |
| 6. | Osleidys Menéndez (CUB) | 60.90 m |
| 7. | Karen Forkel (GER) | 60.70 m |
| 8. | Zuleima Araméndiz (COL) | 58.98 m |
| 9. | Laverne Eve (BAH) | 58.80 m |
| 10. | Nikolett Szabó (HUN) | 57.78 m |
| 11. | Lee Young-Sun (KOR) | 55.98 m |
| 12. | Lynda Lipson (USA) | 52.64 m |
| 13. | Shelley Holroyd (GBR) | 51.06 m |
| 14. | Trishel Thompson (GUY) | 38.14 m |

| RANK | GROUP B | DISTANCE |
|---|---|---|
| 1. | Joanna Stone (AUS) | 67.72 m |
| 2. | Mikaela Ingberg (FIN) | 63.92 m |
| 3. | Sonia Bisset (CUB) | 63.48 m |
| 4. | Tanja Damaske (GER) | 63.30 m |
| 5. | Rita Ramanauskaitė (LTU) | 62.60 m |
| 6. | Tatyana Shikolenko (RUS) | 61.78 m |
| 7. | Silke Renk (GER) | 60.72 m |
| 8. | Odelmys Palma (CUB) | 58.42 m |
| 9. | Tessa Sanderson (GBR) | 57.84 m |
| 10. | Taina Uppa (FIN) | 57.72 m |
| 11. | Ewa Rybak (POL) | 56.24 m |
| 12. | Nicole Carroll (USA) | 55.62 m |
| 13. | Erica Wheeler (USA) | 54.16 m |
| 14. | Ageliki Tsiolakoudi (GRE) | 53.48 m |
| 15. | Nikola Tomečková (CZE) | 52.86 m |

== Final ==
| Rank | Athlete | Attempts | | | | | | Distance | Note |
| Rank | Athlete | 1 | 2 | 3 | 4 | 5 | 6 | Distance | Note |
|---|---|---|---|---|---|---|---|---|---|
| 1st place, gold medalist(s) | Trine Hattestad (NOR) | 68.78 | 63.32 | X | 66.32 | X | 65.46 | 68.78 m | |
| 2nd place, silver medalist(s) | Joanna Stone (AUS) | 64.68 | 68.16 | 66.94 | 66.12 | 68.64 | 68.60 | 68.64 m | |
| 3rd place, bronze medalist(s) | Tanja Damaske (GER) | 64.30 | 63.72 | 64.36 | 64.18 | 66.26 | 67.12 | 67.12 m | |
| 4 | Mikaela Ingberg (FIN) | 64.50 | X | 63.72 | 61.70 | 64.14 | 66.00 | 66.00 m | |
| 5 | Felicia Țilea-Moldovan (ROM) | 60.32 | 55.24 | 64.90 | 61.14 | 59.24 | 64.40 | 64.90 m | |
| 6 | Sonia Bisset (CUB) | 63.80 | 63.16 | 63.08 | 60.44 | 60.52 | 63.34 | 63.80 m | |
| 7 | Osleidys Menéndez (CUB) | 63.76 | 62.44 | X | 59.88 | 63.02 | 62.14 | 63.76 m | |
| 8 | Tatyana Shikolenko (RUS) | X | 63.76 | X | 62.68 | X | X | 63.76 m | |
| 9 | Oksana Ovchinnikova (RUS) | 58.72 | 61.32 | 62.92 | | | | 62.92 m | |
| 10 | Heli Rantanen (FIN) | 62.64 | 59.96 | X | | | | 62.64 m | |
| 11 | Mirela Maniani-Tzelili (GRE) | 61.02 | X | 57.80 | | | | 61.02 m | |
| 12 | Rita Ramanauskaitė (LTU) | 56.80 | 57.38 | 56.36 | | | | 57.38 m | |

== See also ==
- 1996 Women's Olympic Javelin Throw
