= 1993 World Championships in Athletics – Women's javelin throw =

These are the official results of the Women's Javelin Throw event at the 1993 World Championships in Stuttgart, Germany. There were a total number of 31 participating athletes, with the final held on Sunday August 22, 1993. All results were made with a rough surfaced javelin. The qualification mark was set at 62.00 metres.

== Medalists ==
Gold	Trine Solberg-Hattestad; Norway (NOR)
Silver	Karen Forkel; Germany (GER)
Bronze	Natalya Shikolenko; Belarus (BLR)

== Schedule ==
- All times are Central European Time (UTC+1)

Qualification Round
Group A	Group B
21.08.1993 – 10:00h	21.08.1993 – 11:30h
Final Round
16.08.1993 – 19:30h

== Abbreviations ==
- All results shown are in metres

Q	automatic qualification
q	qualification by rank
DNS	did not start
NM	no mark
WR	world record
AR	area record
NR	national record
PB	personal best
SB	season best

== Records ==
Standing records prior to the 1993 World Athletics Championships
World Record	Petra Felke-Meier (GDR)	80.00 m	September 9, 1988	Potsdam, East Germany
Event Record	Fatima Whitbread (GBR)	76.64 m	September 6, 1987	Rome, Italy
Season Best	Trine Hattestad (NOR)	72.12 m	July 10, 1993	Oslo, Norway

== Qualification ==
=== Group A ===
Rank	Overall	Athlete	Attempts			Distance
Rank	Overall	Athlete	1	2	3	Distance
1	1	Trine Solberg-Hattestad (NOR)				66.52 m
2	2	Tatyana Shikolenko (BLR)				63.22 m
3	3	Felicia Țilea-Moldovan (ROM)				62.90 m
4	8	Heli Rantanen (FIN)				60.56 m
5	9	Karen Forkel (GER)				60.54 m
6	11	Antoaneta Todorova (BUL)				59.74 m
7	14	Martine Begue (FRA)				59.16 m
8	15	Jette Jeppesen (DEN)				58.80 m
9	17	Sueli dos Santos (BRA)				57.16 m
10	19	Yelena Svezhentseva (UZB)				55.10 m
11	22	Nikola Tomecková (CZE)				52.06 m

=== Group B ===
Rank	Overall	Athlete	Attempts			Distance
Rank	Overall	Athlete	1	2	3	Distance
1	3	Yekaterina Krasnikova (RUS)				62.90 m
2	5	Silke Renk (GER)				62.88 m
3	6	Natalya Shikolenko (BLR)				62.06 m
4	7	Teresė Nekrošaitė (LTU)				61.02 m
5	10	Claudia Isaila (ROM)				59.88 m
6	12	Steffi Nerius (GER)				59.68 m
7	13	Päivi Alafrantti (FIN)				59.26 m
8	16	Shelley Holroyd (GBR)				57.66 m
9	18	Kinga Zsigmond (HUN)				55.72 m
10	20	Lee Young-Sun (KOR)				54.78 m
11	21	Akiko Miyajima (JPN)				54.50 m
12	23	Iammo Launa (PNG)				46.78 m

== Final ==
Rank	Athlete	Attempts						Distance
Rank	Athlete	1	2	3	4	5	6	Distance
1st place, gold medalist(s)	Trine Solberg-Hattestad (NOR)							69.18 m
2nd place, silver medalist(s)	Karen Forkel (GER)							65.80 m
3rd place, bronze medalist(s)	Natalya Shikolenko (BLR)							65.64 m
4	Tatyana Shikolenko (BLR)							65.18 m
5	Yekaterina Krasnikova (RUS)							65.12 m
6	Silke Renk (GER)							64.00 m
7	Claudia Isaila (ROM)							61.54 m
8	Felicia Țilea-Moldovan (ROM)							61.24 m
9	Steffi Nerius (GER)							60.26 m
10	Antoaneta Todorova (BUL)							58.82 m
11	Heli Rantanen (FIN)							53.14 m
—	Teresė Nekrošaitė (LTU)	X	X	X				NM

== See also ==
- 1992 Women's Olympic Javelin Throw
