= Athletics at the 1989 Summer Universiade – Women's javelin throw =

The women's javelin throw event at the 1989 Summer Universiade was held at the Wedaustadion in Duisburg on 29 and 30 August 1989.

== Medalists ==
| Gold | Silver | Bronze |
|---|---|---|
| Silke Renk; East Germany | Brigitte Graune; West Germany | Päivi Alafrantti; Finland |

== Results ==
=== Qualification ===
Qualification distance: 52.00 metres

| Rank | Group | Athlete | Nationality | Result | Notes |
|---|---|---|---|---|---|
| 1 | ? | Silke Renk | East Germany | 62.04 | Q |
| 2 | ? | Natalya Cherniyenko | Soviet Union | 61.02 | Q |
| 3 | ? | Genowefa Patla | Poland | 60.64 | Q |
| 4 | ? | Heike Galle | East Germany | 60.00 | Q |
| 5 | ? | Luo Zhonghua | China | 59.14 | Q |
| 6 | ? | Ingrid Lammertsma | Netherlands | 59.12 | Q |
| 7 | ? | Brigitte Graune | West Germany | 58.98 | Q |
| 8 | ? | Elisabeth Fernández | Cuba | 56.62 | Q |
| 9 | ? | Cheryl Coker | Canada | 54.94 | Q |
| 10 | ? | Päivi Alafrantti | Finland | 54.72 | Q |
| 11 | ? | Kay Nordstrom | New Zealand | 54.54 | Q |
| 12 | ? | Kate Farrow | Australia | 54.48 | Q |
| 13 | ? | Marilyn Senz | United States | 51.22 | |
| 14 | ? | Lee Hui-cheng | Chinese Taipei | 51.22 | |
| 15 | ? | Natalya Yermolovich | Soviet Union | 50.26 | |
| 16 | ? | Nikki Nye | United States | 49.20 | |

=== Final ===
Held on 30 August

| Rank | Athlete | Nationality | Result | Notes |
|---|---|---|---|---|
| 1st place, gold medalist(s) | Silke Renk | East Germany | 66.09 | |
| 2nd place, silver medalist(s) | Brigitte Graune | West Germany | 62.13 | |
| 3rd place, bronze medalist(s) | Päivi Alafrantti | Finland | 61.75 | |
| 4 | Heike Galle | East Germany | 60.45 | |
| 5 | Ingrid Lammertsma | Netherlands | 59.26 | |
| 6 | Genowefa Patla | Poland | 55.37 | |
| 7 | Kate Farrow | Australia | 53.56 | |
| 8 | Luo Zhonghua | China | 52.63 | |
| 9 | Natalya Cherniyenko | Soviet Union | 52.60 | |
| 10 | Cheryl Coker | Canada | 52.53 | |
| 11 | Kay Nordstrom | New Zealand | 47.78 | |
| | Elisabeth Fernández | Cuba | DNS | |
