= Athletics at the 1987 Summer Universiade – Women's javelin throw =

The women's javelin throw event at the 1987 Summer Universiade was held at the Stadion Maksimir in Zagreb on 19 July 1987.

== Medalists ==
Gold	Silver	Bronze
Irina Kostyuchenkova; Soviet Union	Susanne Jung; East Germany	Brigitte Graune; West Germany

== Results ==
=== Qualification ===
Rank	Athlete	Nationality	Result	Notes
1	Susanne Jung	East Germany	65.38	
2	Irina Kostyuchenkova	Soviet Union	62.02	
3	Beate Peters	West Germany	58.22	
4	Nóra Rockenbauer	Hungary	56.42	
5	Nadine Auzeil	France	55.38	
5	Brigitte Graune	West Germany	55.38	
7	Teresė Nekrošaitė	Soviet Union	54.80	
8	Kristiana Jazbinski	Yugoslavia	52.72	
9	Xin Xiaoli	China	52.04	
9	Liz Mueller	United States	52.04	
11	Päivi Alafrantti	Finland	51.70	
12	Carmen González	Puerto Rico	50.16	
13	Jeanne Villegas	United States	47.36	
14	Ana María Valle	Nicaragua	45.40	
15	Jeanette Beck	Liechtenstein	42.92	

=== Final ===
Rank	Athlete	Nationality	Result	Notes
1st place, gold medalist(s)	Irina Kostyuchenkova	Soviet Union	66.72	
2nd place, silver medalist(s)	Susanne Jung	East Germany	65.36	
3rd place, bronze medalist(s)	Brigitte Graune	West Germany	61.24	
4	Kristiana Jazbinski	Yugoslavia	59.74	
5	Beate Peters	West Germany	58.64	
6	Xin Xiaoli	China	58.56	
7	Nóra Rockenbauer	Hungary	57.14	
8	Teresė Nekrošaitė	Soviet Union	56.06	
9	Nadine Auzeil	France	52.40	
10	Liz Mueller	United States	51.38	
11	Carmen González	Puerto Rico	45.92	
	Päivi Alafrantti	Finland	NM	
