= 1990 European Athletics Championships – Women's javelin throw =

Women's javelin throw at the European Athletics Championships

These are the official results of the Women's Javelin Throw event at the 1990 European Championships in Split, Yugoslavia, held at Stadion Poljud on 29 and 30 August 1990. All results were made with a rough surfaced javelin (old design).

== Medalists ==
Gold	Päivi Alafrantti; Finland (FIN)
Silver	Karen Forkel; East Germany (GDR)
Bronze	Petra Felke; East Germany (GDR)

== Abbreviations ==
- All results shown are in metres

Q	automatic qualification
q	qualification by rank
DNS	did not start
NM	no mark
WR	world record
AR	area record
NR	national record
PB	personal best
SB	season best

== Records ==
Standing records prior to the 1990 European Athletics Championships
World Record	Petra Felke (GDR)	80.00 m	September 9, 1988	Potsdam, East Germany
Event Record	Fatima Whitbread (GBR)	77.44 m	August 28, 1986	Stuttgart, West Germany

== Final ==
Rank	Athlete	Attempts						Distance	Note
Rank	Athlete	1	2	3	4	5	6	Distance	Note
1st place, gold medalist(s)	Päivi Alafrantti (FIN)							67.68 m	
2nd place, silver medalist(s)	Karen Forkel (GDR)							67.56 m	
3rd place, bronze medalist(s)	Petra Felke (GDR)							66.56 m	
4	Silke Renk (GDR)							64.76 m	
5	Katalin Hartai (HUN)							63.52 m	
6	Ingrid Thyssen (FRG)							61.84 m	
7	Antoaneta Selenska (BUL)							61.24 m	
8	Anna Verouli (GRE)							59.32 m	
9	Tiina Lillak (FIN)							58.80 m	
10	Brigitte Graune (FRG)							58.54 m	
11	Tessa Sanderson (GBR)							57.56 m	
12	Natalya Shikolenko (URS)							53.98 m	
	Felicia Ţilea (ROM)							DQ	Doping^{†}

^{†}: Felicia Ţilea ranked initially 9th (58.80m), but was disqualified for infringement of IAAF doping rules.

== Qualification ==
=== Group A ===
Rank	Overall	Athlete	Attempts			Distance	Note
Rank	Overall	Athlete	1	2	3	Distance	Note
1	1	Brigitte Graune (FRG)				64.18 m	
2	2	Silke Renk (GDR)				63.36 m	
3	3	Petra Felke (GDR)				63.22 m	
4	5	Katalin Hartai (HUN)				61.60 m	
5	8	Natalya Shikolenko (URS)				59.92 m	
6	9	Anna Verouli (GRE)				59.36 m	
7	11	Antoaneta Selenska (BUL)				58.72 m	
8	16	Amanda Liverton (GBR)				55.44 m	
9	17	Heli Rantanen (FIN)				54.02 m	
		Felicia Ţilea (ROM)				DQ	Q Doping^{†}

^{†}: Felicia Ţilea initially reached the final (60.96m), but was disqualified later for infringement of IAAF doping rules.

=== Group B ===
Rank	Overall	Athlete	Attempts			Distance	Note
Rank	Overall	Athlete	1	2	3	Distance	Note
1	4	Tiina Lillak (FIN)				62.62 m	
2	6	Tessa Sanderson (GBR)				60.66 m	
3	7	Ingrid Thyssen (FRG)				60.02 m	
4	10	Karen Forkel (GDR)				59.28 m	
5	12	Zsuzsa Malovecz (HUN)				58.48 m	
6	13	Natalya Chernyenko (URS)				57.46 m	
7	14	Nadine Auzeil (FRA)				56.88 m	
8	15	Sharon Gibson (GBR)				55.98 m	
		Päivi Alafrantti (FIN)				NM	Q^{‡}

^{‡}: All three attempts from Päivi Alafrantti were initially voided. In the only measurable throw, the javelin landed flat. After a protest of the Finnish team officials and video inspection, the decision was reverted because it could be shown that the tip of the javelin struck the ground first, and Alafrantti was admitted to compete in the final.

== Participation ==
According to an unofficial count, 19 athletes from 10 countries participated in the event.

- Bulgaria (1)
- East Germany (3)
- Finland (3)
- France (1)
- Greece (1)
- Hungary (2)
- Romania (1)
- Soviet Union (2)
- United Kingdom (3)
- West Germany (2)

== See also ==
- 1988 Women's Olympic Javelin Throw (Seoul)
- 1991 Women's World Championships Javelin Throw (Tokyo)
- 1992 Women's Olympic Javelin Throw (Barcelona)
