= Silke Gast =

Personal information
- Nationality: German
- Born: April 30, 1972 (age 53)

Sport
- Sport: Javelin

Silke Gast (born 30 April 1972) is a retired female javelin thrower from Germany.

She finished fourth at the 1994 European Championships. Her only medal at the German championships came in 1994 when she won the bronze behind Karen Forkel and Tanja Damaske.

== Achievements ==
Year	Competition	Venue	Position	Notes
Representing Germany
1994	European Championships	Helsinki, Finland	4th	62.90 m
