= Masters W50 javelin world record progression =

Masters W50 javelin world record progression is the progression of world record improvements of the javelin throw W50 division of Masters athletics. Records must be set in properly conducted, official competitions under the standing IAAF rules unless modified by World Masters Athletics. The W50 division consists of female athletes who have reached the age of 50 but have not yet reached the age of 55, so exactly from their 50th birthday to the day before their 55th birthday. The W50 division throws a 500 g implement.

Key

Incomplete information Pending

| Distance | Athlete | Nationality | Birthdate | Age | Location | Date | Ref |
|---|---|---|---|---|---|---|---|
| 47.53 m | Felicia Ureche | Spain | 27 September 1967 | 50 years, 178 days | Madrid | 24 March 2018 | |
| 47.14 m | Genowefa Patla | Poland | 17 October 1962 | 52 years, 299 days | Lyon | 12 August 2015 | |
| 45.10 m | Monika David | France | 1 March 1965 | 50 years, 164 days | Lyon | 12 August 2015 | |
| 44.20 m | Ingrid Anna Thyssen | Germany | 9 January 1956 | 50 years, 208 days | Aachen | 5 August 2006 | |
| 44.18 m | Monica Kendall | United States | 1 December 1955 | 50 years, 219 days | Gresham | 8 July 2006 | |
| 41.50 m | Regina Stange | Germany | 24 May 1952 | 50 years, 89 days | Potsdam | 21 August 2002 | |
| 38.45 m | Elisabeth Wendl | Austria | 2 March 1947 | 54 years, 100 days | Kapfenberg | 10 June 2001 | |
| 36.98 m | Anneli Virkkala | Finland | 13 March 1947 | 53 years, 121 days | Jyvaskyla | 12 July 2000 | |
