= 1990 World Junior Championships in Athletics – Women's javelin throw =

The women's javelin throw event at the 1990 World Junior Championships in Athletics was held in Plovdiv, Bulgaria, at Deveti Septemvri Stadium on 10 and 11 August. An old specification 600g javelin was used.

== Medalists ==
Gold	Tanja Damaske; East Germany
Silver	Oksana Ovchinnikova; Soviet Union
Bronze	Mandy Liverton; United Kingdom

== Results ==
=== Final ===
11 August

Rank	Name	Nationality	Attempts						Result	Notes
Rank	Name	Nationality	1	2	3	4	5	6	Result	Notes
1st place, gold medalist(s)	Tanja Damaske	East Germany	61.06	56.60	x	54.76	55.98	x	61.06	
2nd place, silver medalist(s)	Oksana Ovchinnikova	Soviet Union	57.26	56.28	x	x	54.90	54.66	57.26	
3rd place, bronze medalist(s)	Mandy Liverton	United Kingdom	53.90	54.78	56.68	55.72	54.60	54.30	56.68	
4	Hou Lili	China	54.24	53.60	55.96	52.86	50.76	55.44	55.96	
5	Claudia Isaila	Romania	52.46	x	54.74	53.58	52.12	52.94	54.74	
6	Odelmys Palma	Cuba	x	52.82	51.86	53.94	53.74	49.36	53.94	
7	Yvonne Reichardt	East Germany	50.94	49.30	52.76	51.36	50.96	52.16	52.76	
8	Khrysoula Maguina	Greece	50.30	52.42	49.60	51.20	51.78	51.50	52.42	
9	Natalya Tilkova	Soviet Union	51.92	50.46	51.36				51.92	
10	Nathalie Teppe	France	49.88	49.76	-				49.88	
11	Sonia Bisset	Cuba	49.04	49.46	x				49.46	
12	Ágnes Preisinger	Hungary	44.78	45.50	47.36				47.36	

=== Qualifications ===
10 Aug

==== Group A ====
Rank	Name	Nationality	Attempts			Result	Notes
Rank	Name	Nationality	1	2	3	Result	Notes
1	Hou Lili	China	56.58	-	-	56.58	Q
2	Oksana Ovchinnikova	Soviet Union	56.12	-	-	56.12	Q
3	Nathalie Teppe	France	52.88	-	-	52.88	Q
4	Mandy Liverton	United Kingdom	52.24	-	-	52.24	Q
5	Tanja Damaske	East Germany	49.48	x	52.14	52.14	Q
6	Sonia Bisset	Cuba	50.50	48.12	51.98	51.98	Q
7	Yvonne Reichardt	East Germany	51.52	-	-	51.52	Q
8	Khrysoula Maguina	Greece	51.14	-	-	51.14	Q
9	Natalya Tilkova	Soviet Union	50.52	x	49.46	50.52	q
10	Claudia Isaila	Romania	49.34	x	50.08	50.08	q
11	Ágnes Preisinger	Hungary	47.80	46.26	49.36	49.36	q
12	Odelmys Palma	Cuba	42.28	46.48	49.02	49.02	q
13	Nicola Emblem	United Kingdom	48.48	47.22	47.96	48.48	
14	Helena Gouvela	Portugal	42.96	41.70	47.36	47.36	
15	Khristina Georgieva	Bulgaria	45.42	47.10	46.52	47.10	
16	Gloria Crippa	Italy	46.16	46.12	x	46.16	
17	Krasimira Bosinakova	Bulgaria	43.82	45.98	45.90	45.98	
18	Liao Shu-hao	Chinese Taipei	x	44.42	44.06	44.42	
19	Daleen Botha	Namibia	x	44.20	x	44.20	
20	Tomomi Oneyama	Japan	43.94	43.30	44.10	44.10	
21	Nina Dubowski	Norway	43.44	43.16	x	43.44	
22	Renata Strašek	Yugoslavia	42.98	x	x	42.98	

== Participation ==
According to an unofficial count, 22 athletes from 17 countries participated in the event.

- Bulgaria (2)
- China (1)
- Chinese Taipei (1)
- Cuba (2)
- East Germany (2)
- France (1)
- Greece (1)
- Hungary (1)
- Italy (1)
- Japan (1)
- Namibia (1)
- Norway (1)
- Portugal (1)
- Romania (1)
- Soviet Union (2)
- United Kingdom (2)
- Yugoslavia (1)
