= Athletics at the 1998 Commonwealth Games – Women's javelin throw =

Women's javelin throw at the Commonwealth Games

The women's javelin throw event at the 1998 Commonwealth Games was held in Kuala Lumpur on 19 September 1998.

This was the last time that the old model of javelin was used in the women's competition at the Commonwealth Games. The winning margin was 9.14 metres which as of 2024 remains the only time the women's javelin throw was won by more than 9 metres at these games.

== Results ==
Rank	Name	Nationality	#1	#2	#3	#4	#5	#6	Result	Notes
1st place, gold medalist(s)	Louise McPaul	Australia	65.37	65.90					66.96	PB
2nd place, silver medalist(s)	Karen Martin	England	53.88	50.39	55.39				57.82	PB
3rd place, bronze medalist(s)	Kirsty Morrison	England	54.09	48.53	56.34				56.34	SB
4	Lorna Jackson	Scotland							52.97	
5	Shelley Holroyd	England							50.64	
6	Iloai Suaniu	Samoa							43.51	
7	Lindy Leveaux	Seychelles							42.94	
