= Athletics at the 1994 Commonwealth Games – Women's javelin throw =

Women's javelin throw at the Commonwealth Games

The women's javelin throw event at the 1994 Commonwealth Games was held at the Centennial Stadium in Victoria, British Columbia.

== Results ==
Rank	Name	Nationality	#1	#2	#3	#4	#5	#6	Result	Notes
1st place, gold medalist(s)	Louise McPaul	Australia	63.76						63.76	
2nd place, silver medalist(s)	Kirsten Hellier	New Zealand	53.42	56.04	53.54	x	56.36	60.40	60.40	
3rd place, bronze medalist(s)	Sharon Gibson	England	55.54	54.36	54.20	58.20			58.20	
4	Joanna Stone	Australia	46.84	55.44	54.06	57.60			57.60	
5	Valerie Tulloch	Canada							57.26	
6	Kate Farrow	Australia							56.98	
7	Laverne Eve	Bahamas							55.54	
8	Kaye Nordstrom	New Zealand							54.90	
9	Isabelle Surprenant	Canada							52.32	
10	Iammo Launa	Papua New Guinea							49.20	
11	Stephanie Proctor	Canada							49.18	
12	Karen Costello	Scotland							48.58	
