= Claudia Isăilă =

Romanian javelin thrower

Personal information
- Born: 17 July 1973 (age 53) Sibiu, Romania

Sport
- Sport: Track and field
Medal record
Representing Romania
Summer Universiade
Silver medal – second place	1995 Fukuoka	Javelin throw

Claudia Isăilă (born 17 July 1973) is a Romanian female former track and field athlete who competed in the javelin throw. She set a career best of 66.56 m (218 ft 4 1/4 in) at the 1994 IAAF Grand Prix Final, which brought her third place and ranked her fourth on the global rankings for the year.

After a fifth place finish at the 1990 World Junior Championships in Athletics, Isăilă emerged two years later with a bronze medal at the 1992 European Athletics U23 Cup then a gold medal at the 1992 World Junior Championships in Athletics. She made the final at the 1993 World Championships in Athletics a year later, ending the competition in seventh place. A silver medal came at the 1995 Summer Universiade behind her compatriot Felicia Țilea. She was a finalist at the 1994 European Athletics Championships and represented Romania one further time globally at the 1995 World Championships in Athletics, though she did not progress beyond qualifying.

She won one national title at the Romanian Athletics Championships, doing so in 1995 with a championship record mark of 63.86 m (209 ft 6 in) with the old javelin design.

== International competitions ==
Year	Competition	Venue	Position	Event	Notes
1990	World Junior Championships	Plovdiv, Bulgaria	5th	Javelin	54.74
1992	European U23 Cup	Gateshead, United Kingdom	3rd	Javelin	55.98 m
1992	World Junior Championships	Seoul, South Korea	1st	Javelin	63.04 m
1993	World Championships	Stuttgart, Germany	7th	Javelin	61.54 m
1994	European Championships	Helsinki, Finland	11th	Javelin	56.92 m
1994	IAAF Grand Prix Final	Paris, France	3rd	Javelin	66.56 m
1995	Universiade	Fukuoka, Japan	2nd	Javelin	61.74 m
1995	World Championships	Gothenburg, Sweden	22nd (q)	Javelin	55.84 m
1997	Universiade	Catania, Italy	6th	Javelin	59.16 m

== National titles ==
- Romanian Athletics Championships
  - Javelin: 1995
