= Shikolenko =

Shikolenko is a surname. Notable people with the surname include:

- Natalya Shikolenko (1964–2025), Belarusian javelin thrower
- Tatyana Shikolenko (born 1968), Russian-Belarusian javelin thrower
