= Karen Forkel =

German javelin thrower

Personal information
- Nationality: East Germany; Germany
- Born: 24 September 1970 (age 56) Wolfen, Saxony-Anhalt, East Germany
- Height: 1.72 m (5 ft 8 in)
- Weight: 63 kg (139 lb)

Sport
- Country: East Germany; Germany
- Sport: Athletics
- Event: Javelin throw
- Club: SV Halle

Achievements and titles
- Personal best: 71.20 (1991)
Medal record
Women's athletics
Representing East Germany
European Championships
Silver medal – second place	1990 Split	Javelin throw
Representing Germany
Olympic Games
Bronze medal – third place	1992 Barcelona	Javelin throw
World Championships
Silver medal – second place	1993 Stuttgart	Javelin throw
European Championships
Silver medal – second place	1994 Helsinki	Javelin throw
Summer Universiade
Bronze medal – third place	1997 Catania	Javelin throw

Karen Forkel (born 24 September 1970) is a German track and field athlete and an Olympic medal winner. In the 1990s she was among the world's best javelin throwers. Her biggest success came in the 1992 Summer Olympics when she took the bronze medal with a throw of 66.86 meters.

Her personal best throw with the new-type-javelin was 65.17 metres, achieved in July 1999 in Erfurt. This ranks her fifth among German javelin throwers, behind Christina Obergföll, Steffi Nerius, Tanja Damaske and Linda Stahl. With the old javelin type she threw 70.20 metres in May 1991 in Halle. This ranks her fifth among German old-type-javelin throwers, behind Petra Felke (who held the world record), Antje Kempe, Silke Renk and Beate Koch.

Forkel represented SC Chemie Halle, which after the German reunification was renamed SV Halle. During her career she was 1.72 meters tall and weighed 63 kilograms.

== International competitions ==
Year	Competition	Venue	Position	Notes
Representing East Germany
1987	European Junior Championships	Birmingham, United Kingdom	3rd	57.00 m
1988	World Junior Championships	Sudbury, Canada	1st	61.44 m
1989	European Junior Championships	Varaždin, Yugoslavia	1st	70.12 m
1990	European Championships	Split, Yugoslavia	2nd	67.56 m
Representing Germany
1991	World Championships	Tokyo, Japan	12th	57.90 m
1992	Olympic Games	Barcelona, Spain	3rd	66.86 m
1993	World Championships	Stuttgart, Germany	2nd	65.80 m
1994	European Championships	Helsinki, Finland	2nd	66.10 m
1995	World Championships	Gothenburg, Sweden	6th	64.18 m
1996	Olympic Games	Atlanta, United States	6th	64.18 m
1997	World Championships	Athens, Greece	14th	60.70 m
1999	World Championships	Seville, Spain	12th	54.65 m

- 1993 European Cup (athletics) final: 2nd place (61.92)
- 1994 IAAF World Cup final: 3rd place (61.26); 1994 European cup final: 2nd place (65.58)
- 2000 European Cup (athletics) Final: 6th place (52.89)
