= Sueli dos Santos =

Brazilian javelin thrower

Personal information
- Born: January 8, 1965 (age 61) Cascavel, Paraná, Brazil

Sport
- Sport: Track and field

Sueli Pereira dos Santos (born January 8, 1965) is a retired female javelin thrower from Brazil. At the age of 35, she set her personal best (61.98 metres) on May 6, 2000, in Bogotá. That mark was a Masters W35 World Record that lasted about a month until it was surpassed by Russian Olympian Yekaterina Ivakina, who would improve the record four more times in the next two months.

== International competitions ==
Year	Competition	Venue	Position	Notes
Representing Brazil
1983	South American Junior Championships	Medellín, Colombia	1st	50.42 m
1985	South American Championships	Santiago, Chile	2nd	51.52 m
1986	Ibero-American Championships	Havana, Cuba	3rd	52.34 m
1987	Pan American Games	Indianapolis, United States	4th	57.02 m
1987	World Championships	Rome, Italy	13th (q)	55.48 m
1987	South American Championships	São Paulo, Brazil	1st	56.00 m
1988	Ibero-American Championships	Mexico City, Mexico	3rd	56.10 m A
1989	South American Championships	Medellín, Colombia	3rd	52.78 m
1991	South American Championships	Manaus, Brazil	2nd	56.64 m
1991	Pan American Games	Havana, Cuba	7th	50.66 m
1991	World Championships	Tokyo, Japan	28th (q)	51.20 m
1993	World Championships	Stuttgart, Germany	17th (q)	57.16 m
1994	Ibero-American Championships	Mar del Plata, Argentina	1st	65.96 m
1999	South American Championships	Bogotá, Colombia	2nd	58.16 m
1999	Pan American Games	Winnipeg, Canada	6th	52.58 m
2000	Ibero-American Championships	Rio de Janeiro, Brazil	2nd	58.94 m
2000	Olympic Games	Sydney, Australia	23rd (q)	56.27 m
