= Masters W60 javelin 500g world record progression =

Masters W60 javelin world record progression is the progression of world record improvements of the javelin throw W60 division of Masters athletics. Records must be set in properly conducted, official competitions under the standing IAAF rules unless modified by World Masters Athletics. The W60 division consists of female athletes who have reached the age of 60 but have not yet reached the age of 65, so exactly from their 60th birthday to the day before their 65th birthday. Since 2014, the W60 division throws a 500 g implement. Two months into the first season, Linda Cohn threw the record that has not been surpassed since.

Key

Incomplete information Pending

Distance	Athlete	Nationality	Birthdate	Age	Location	Date	Ref
41.14	Genowefa Patla	Poland	17 October 1962	60 years, 163 days	Toruń	29 March 2023	
37.50	Linda Cohn	United States	7 December 1952	61 years, 146 days	Northridge	2 May 2014	
