= Athletics at the 1992 Summer Olympics – Women's javelin throw =

Women's javelin throw at the Games of the XXV Olympiad
- Pictogram for Athletics
- Venue: Estadi Olímpic de Montjuïc
- Dates: 31 July (qualification); 1 August (final)
- Competitors: 25 from 17 nations
- Winning distance: 68.34

Medalists
1st place, gold medalist(s)		Silke Renk; Germany
2nd place, silver medalist(s)		Natalya Shikolenko; Unified Team
3rd place, bronze medalist(s)		Karen Forkel; Germany

These are the official results of the women's javelin throw event at the 1992 Summer Olympics in Barcelona, Spain. There were a total of 25 participating athletes. The top 12 and ties, and all those reaching 62.50 metres advanced to the final. The javelin used was an "old design" rough surfaced javelin.

The winning margin was 8 cm which as of 2023 remains the only time the women's javelin throw was won by less than 10 cm at the Olympics.

== Medalists ==
Gold	Silke Renk; Germany
Silver	Natalya Shikolenko; Unified Team
Bronze	Karen Forkel; Germany

== Abbreviations ==
Q	automatic qualification
q	qualification by rank
DNS	did not start
NM	no mark
WR	world record
AR	area record
NR	national record
PB	personal best
SB	season best

== Records ==
Standing records prior to the 1992 Summer Olympics
World Record	Petra Felke (GDR)	80.00 m	September 9, 1988	Potsdam, East Germany
Olympic Record	Petra Felke (GDR)	74.68 m	September 26, 1988	Seoul, South Korea

- The World and Olympic record holder Petra Felke competed in this event under the name Petra Meier.

== Qualification ==
=== Group A ===
Rank	Overall	Athlete	Attempts			Distance	Note
Rank	Overall	Athlete	1	2	3	Distance	Note
1	2	Trine Hattestad (NOR)	67.20	—	—	67.20 m	
2	6	Donna Mayhew (USA)	58.76	58.02	61.24	61.24 m	
3	7	Kinga Zsigmond (HUN)	58.18	55.60	60.74	60.74 m	
4	8	Tessa Sanderson (GBR)	60.70	X	53.20	60.70 m	
5	9	Petra Meier (GER)	60.58	59.42	57.40	60.58 m	
6	10	Louise McPaul (AUS)	58.00	59.24	60.56	60.56 m	
7	12	Dulce García (CUB)	60.44	X	57.02	60.44 m	SB
8	14	Xu Demei (CHN)	X	X	59.98	59.98 m	
9	17	Kirsten Smith (NZL)	X	53.82	59.34	59.34 m	
10	20	Irina Kostyuchenkova (EUN)	X	57.96	X	57.96 m	
11	21	Anna Verouli (GRE)	55.82	56.96	56.60	56.96 m	
12	24	Vijitha Amerasekera (SRI)	X	48.00	44.70	48.00 m	
—	—	Päivi Alafrantti (FIN)	X	X	X	NM	

=== Group B ===
Rank	Overall	Athlete	Attempts			Distance	Note
Rank	Overall	Athlete	1	2	3	Distance	Note
1	1	Natalya Shikolenko (EUN)	67.36	—	—	67.36 m	
2	3	Karen Forkel (GER)	62.28	61.48	65.44	65.44 m	
3	4	Silke Renk (GER)	65.38	—	—	65.38 m	
4	5	Heli Rantanen (FIN)	63.98	—	—	63.98 m	
5	11	Yelena Svezhentseva (EUN)	54.66	60.44	57.76	60.44 m	SB
6	13	Isel López (CUB)	X	X	60.42	60.42 m	
7	15	Ha Xiaoyan (CHN)	59.70	56.58	58.38	59.70 m	
8	16	Antoaneta Selenska (BUL)	59.40	57.86	57.78	59.40 m	
9	18	Teresė Nekrošaitė (LTU)	58.28	X	X	58.28 m	
10	19	Genowefa Patla (POL)	X	55.14	58.18	58.18 m	
11	22	Lee Young-Sun (KOR)	55.10	X	54.54	55.10 m	
12	23	Paula Berry (USA)	48.70	X	49.00	49.00 m	

== Final ==
Rank	Athlete	Attempts						Distance	Note
Rank	Athlete	1	2	3	4	5	6	Distance	Note
1st place, gold medalist(s)	Silke Renk (GER)	67.24	62.08	65.34	65.62	65.62	68.34	68.34 m	
2nd place, silver medalist(s)	Natalya Shikolenko (EUN)	68.26	67.42	X	X	X	X	68.26 m	
3rd place, bronze medalist(s)	Karen Forkel (GER)	65.02	X	62.76	65.84	66.86	66.80	66.86 m	
4	Tessa Sanderson (GBR)	63.58	X	62.60	X	X	59.80	63.58 m	
5	Trine Hattestad (NOR)	59.52	58.52	63.54	X	59.70	X	63.54 m	
6	Heli Rantanen (FIN)	62.34	59.62	X	58.02	61.36	58.76	62.34 m	
7	Petra Meier (GER)	X	58.36	58.34	X	57.54	59.02	59.02 m	
8	Dulce García (CUB)	54.56	58.00	58.26	X	X	X	58.26 m	
9	Yelena Svezhentseva (EUN)	56.50	57.32	53.82				57.32 m	
10	Kinga Zsigmond (HUN)	56.54	54.78	55.16				56.54 m	
11	Louise McPaul (AUS)	54.92	56.00	X				56.00 m	
12	Donna Mayhew (USA)	X	55.68	54.36				55.68 m	

== See also ==
- 1990 Women's European Championships Javelin Throw (Split)
- 1991 Women's World Championship Javelin Throw (Tokyo)
- 1993 Women's World Championships Javelin Throw (Stuttgart)
- 1994 Women's European Championships Javelin Throw (Helsinki)
