= Auzeil =

Auzeil is a surname. Notable people with the surname include:

- Bastien Auzeil (born 1989), French decathlete
- Nadine Auzeil (born 1964), French javelin thrower, mother of Bastien
