= Miyajima (disambiguation) =

Miyajima (宮島) may refer to:

== Places ==
- Itsukushima, or Miyajima, an island in Hiroshima Bay, Japan
  - Miyajima, Hiroshima, a former town on the island, merged into Hatsukaichi in 2005
  - Itsukushima Shrine, a Shinto shrine on the island
  - Battle of Miyajima (1555)

== People with the surname ==
- Akiko Miyajima (宮島 秋子; born 1966), Japanese javelin thrower
- Katsuyuki Miyajima (宮嶋 克幸; born 1995), Japanese skeleton racer
- Keiko Miyajima (宮島 恵子; born 1965), Japanese former volleyball player
- Reiji Miyajima (宮島 礼吏; born 1985), Japanese manga artist
- Tatsuo Miyajima (宮島 達男; born 1957), Japanese sculptor and installation artist
