= Lionel Smith =

Lionel Smith may refer to:

- Lionel Smith (footballer) (1920–1980), English footballer
- Lionel Mark Smith (1946–2008), American actor
- Sir Lionel Smith, 1st Baronet (1778–1842), British diplomat, colonial administrator and soldier
- Lionel Smith (athlete), New Zealand hurdler
- Lionel Smith (legal scholar), Canadian legal scholar, incumbent Professor of Comparative Law at the University of Oxford
