= Odelmys Palma =

Cuban javelin thrower

Medal record

Athletics

Representing Cuba

CAC Junior Championships (U20)
Gold medal – first place	1990 Havana	Javelin throw

Odelmys Palma López (Spanish pronunciation: [oˈðelmis ˈpalma]; born 18 December 1971 in Havana, Ciudad de la Habana) is a retired javelin thrower from Cuba.

== Career ==
She finished eleventh at the 1996 Summer Olympics. She threw 65.80 metres with the old javelin model in June 1997 in Havana.

== Achievements ==
Year	Competition	Venue	Position	Event	Notes
Representing Cuba
1990	Central American and Caribbean Junior Championships (U-20)	Havana, Cuba	1st	Javelin	56.66 m
1990	World Junior Championships	Plovdiv, Bulgaria	6th	Javelin	53.94 m
1996	Ibero-American Championships	Medellín, Colombia	2nd	Javelin	63.32 m
1996	Olympic Games	Atlanta, United States	11th	Javelin	59.70 m
1997	World Championships	Athens, Greece	8th (q)	Javelin	58.42 m
