= 1988 World Junior Championships in Athletics – Women's javelin throw =

The women's javelin throw event at the 1988 World Junior Championships in Athletics was held in Sudbury, Ontario, Canada, at Laurentian University Stadium on 29 and 30 July. An old specification 600g javelin was used.

== Medalists ==
Gold	Karen Forkel; East Germany
Silver	Isel López; Cuba
Bronze	Małgorzata Kielczewska; Poland

== Results ==
=== Final ===
30 July

Rank	Name	Nationality	Result	Notes
1st place, gold medalist(s)	Karen Forkel	East Germany	61.44	
2nd place, silver medalist(s)	Isel López	Cuba	57.86	
3rd place, bronze medalist(s)	Małgorzata Kielczewska	Poland	57.04	
4	Anna Chorinou	Greece	55.20	
5	Khrysoula Maguina	Greece	52.82	
6	Luo Zhonghua	China	52.58	
7	Katja Hausmann	West Germany	52.20	
8	Jaana Suuronen	Finland	49.86	
9	Mandy Liverton	United Kingdom	49.00	
10	Matilda Kisava	Tanzania	48.06	
11	Kirsten Smith	New Zealand	47.66	
12	Valeria Ivanova	Soviet Union	43.30	

=== Qualifications ===
29 Jul

==== Group A ====
Rank	Name	Nationality	Result	Notes
1	Karen Forkel	East Germany	58.80	Q
2	Anna Chorinou	Greece	53.72	Q
3	Valeria Ivanova	Soviet Union	51.02	q
4	Katja Hausmann	West Germany	49.58	q
5	Matilda Kisava	Tanzania	49.52	q
6	Mandy Liverton	United Kingdom	49.36	q
7	Isabelle Surprenant	Canada	48.34	
8	Louise McPaul	Australia	47.94	
9	Paula Berry	United States	45.16	
10	Bertha Sofia Gómez	Colombia	41.40	

==== Group B ====
Rank	Name	Nationality	Result	Notes
1	Isel López	Cuba	53.78	Q
2	Luo Zhonghua	China	53.70	Q
3	Małgorzata Kielczewska	Poland	51.68	Q
4	Jaana Suuronen	Finland	51.10	q
5	Khrysoula Maguina	Greece	50.13	q
6	Kirsten Smith	New Zealand	48.94	q
7	Stefania Galbiati	Italy	48.34	
8	Greta Semsroth	United States	47.30	
9	Gabrielle Prenter	Australia	46.00	
10	Nicola Emblem	United Kingdom	44.82	
11	Kelly-Anne Kempf	Canada	44.44	
12	Marie-Danielle Teanyouen	France	41.90	
13	Alexandra Dumas	Brazil	40.62	
14	Terry-Lynn Paynter	Bermuda	39.10	
15	Natalia Toledo	Paraguay	38.80	

== Participation ==
According to an unofficial count, 25 athletes from 20 countries participated in the event.

- Australia (2)
- Bermuda (1)
- Brazil (1)
- Canada (2)
- China (1)
- Colombia (1)
- Cuba (1)
- East Germany (1)
- Finland (1)
- France (1)
- Greece (2)
- Italy (1)
- New Zealand (1)
- Paraguay (1)
- Poland (1)
- Soviet Union (1)
- Tanzania (1)
- United Kingdom (2)
- United States (2)
- West Germany (1)
