= Yelena Svezhentseva =

Uzbekistani javelin thrower

Yelena Svezhentseva (née Burgiman; born December 21, 1968) is a retired female javelin thrower from Uzbekistan. She represented the Unified Team at the 1992 Summer Olympics, finishing in ninth place in the final rankings. She set her personal best (61.76 metres) in 1992 with the old javelin type.

== Achievements ==
| Year | Competition | Venue | Position | Notes |
Representing Unified Team
| 1992 | Olympic Games | Barcelona, Spain | 9th | 57.32 m |
Representing Uzbekistan
| 1993 | World Championships | Stuttgart, Germany | 19th | 55.10 m |
