= Katalin Hartai =

Hungarian javelin thrower

Personal information
- Born: 23 March 1963 (age 63) Budapest, Hungary

Sport
- Sport: Track and field

Katalin Hartai (born 24 March 1963) is a retired female javelin thrower from Hungary who represented her native country during the 1980s and the early 1990s.

== Achievements ==
| Year | Tournament | Venue | Result | Extra |
|---|---|---|---|---|
| 1987 | World Championships | Rome, Italy | 11th | 60.88 m |
| 1990 | European Championships | Split, FR Yugoslavia | 5th | 63.52 m |
| 1991 | World Championships | Tokyo, Japan | 21st | 55.68 m |

== Awards ==
- Hungarian athlete of the Year (1): 1990
