= Renata Strašek =

Slovenian javelin thrower

Renata Strašek (born April 8, 1972, in Celje) is a retired female javelin thrower from Slovenia. She set her personal best (64.68 metres) in 1995 with the old javelin type.

== International competitions ==
Year	Competition	Venue	Position	Notes
Representing Yugoslavia
1989	European Junior Championships	Varaždin, Yugoslavia	16th	45.04 m
1990	World Junior Championships	Plovdiv, Bulgaria	22nd (q)	42.98 m
Representing Slovenia
1993	Mediterranean Games	Narbonne, France	3rd	59.04 m
1995	World Championships	Gothenburg, Sweden	9th	59.10 m
1996	Olympic Games	Atlanta, United States	21st	57.04 m
