= Athletics at the 1991 Summer Universiade – Women's javelin throw =

The women's javelin throw event at the 1991 Summer Universiade was held at the Don Valley Stadium in Sheffield on 22 July 1991.

== Results ==
Rank	Athlete	Nationality	#1	#2	#3	#4	#5	#6	Result	Notes
1st place, gold medalist(s)	Tatyana Shikolenko	Soviet Union	60.58	63.56	59.34	x	x	–	63.56	
2nd place, silver medalist(s)	Isel López	Cuba							62.32	
3rd place, bronze medalist(s)	Paula Berry	United States							58.28	
4	Louise McPaul	Australia							57.60	
5	Manuela Alizadeh	Germany							57.22	
6	Sun Xiurong	China							55.48	
7	Kaye Nordstrom	New Zealand							55.14	
8	Nadine Auzeil	France							54.74	
9	Aysel Taş	Turkey							51.14	
10	Ashley Selman	United States							48.68	
11	Lee Hiu-Chen	Chinese Taipei							48.14	
12	Caroline White	Great Britain	x	x	44.86				44.86	
