= Rita Ramanauskaitė =

Lithuanian javelin thrower (born 1970)

Personal information
- Born: November 22, 1970 (age 55) Kaunas, Lithuanian SSR, Soviet Union
- Height: 175 cm (5 ft 9 in)
- Weight: 73 kg (161 lb)

Sport
- Country: Lithuania
- Sport: Javelin

Rita Ramanauskaitė (born 22 November 1970) is a female javelin thrower from Lithuania. Born in Kaunas, her personal best throw of 62.69 metres, achieved in June 2000 in Saint-Denis, is the Lithuanian record.

She competed at the World Championships in 1995, 1997, 1999, 2001 and 2003 and the Olympic Games in 1996, 2000 and 2004, but only reached the final round in 1997, when she finished twelfth.

== Achievements ==
| Year | Competition | Venue | Position | Notes |
Representing Lithuania
| 1994 | European Championships | Helsinki, Finland | 5th | 61.54 m |
| 1996 | Olympic Games | Atlanta, Georgia, United States | 22nd | 56.94 m |
| 1997 | World Championships | Athens, Greece | 12th | 57.38 m |
| 1998 | European Championships | Budapest, Hungary | 11th | 57.11 m |
| 1999 | World Championships | Seville, Spain | 14th | 58.60 m |
| 2000 | Olympic Games | Sydney, Australia | 13th | 59.21 m |
| 2001 | World Championships | Edmonton, Canada | 15th | 57.43 m |
| 2002 | Lithuanian Championships | Kaunas, Lithuania | 2nd | 49.55 m |
| 2003 | World Championships | Paris, France | 14th | 57.13 m |
| 2004 | Olympic Games | Athens, Greece | 31st | 55.17 m |
