= Xu Demei =

Chinese javelin thrower (born 1967)

Medal record

Women's athletics

Representing China

Asian Championships
Gold medal – first place	1991 Kuala Lumpur	Javelin throw
Silver medal – second place	1989 New Delhi	Javelin throw

Xu Demei (Chinese: 徐徳妹; born May 23, 1967, in Zhejiang) is a former track and field athlete from PR China, who competed for her native country in the women's javelin throw event at the 1992 Summer Olympics in Barcelona, Spain. Her biggest success was winning the world title in 1991, a week after China's first ever gold medal at the World Championships in Athletics by shot putter Huang Zhihong.

She was also Asian champion at the 1991 Asian Athletics Championships and won silver medals at the 1989 Asian Athletics Championships and 1990 Asian Games. She was fourth at the 1992 IAAF World Cup.

== International competitions ==
Year	Competition	Venue	Position	Notes
Representing China
1989	Asian Championships	New Delhi, India	2nd	57.32 m
1990	Asian Games	Beijing, China	2nd	61.92 m
1991	Asian Championships	Kuala Lumpur, Malaysia	1st	59.84 m
1991	World Championships	Tokyo, Japan	1st	68.78 m
1992	Olympic Games	Barcelona, Spain	14th	59.98 m
1992	IAAF World Cup	Havana, Cuba	4th	57.80 m

== See also ==
- China at the World Championships in Athletics
