= Masters W35 javelin world record progression =

Masters W35 javelin world record progression is the progression of world record improvements of the javelin throw W35 division of Masters athletics. Records must be set in properly conducted, official competitions under the standing IAAF rules unless modified by World Masters Athletics. The W35 division consists of female athletes who have reached the age of 35 but have not yet reached the age of 40, so exactly from their 35th birthday to the day before their 40th birthday. The W35 division throws exactly the same 600 g implement as the Open division. These competitors all threw their records in open competition.

Key

Incomplete information Pending

Distance	Athlete	Nationality	Birthdate	Location	Date	Ref
68.92	Kathryn Mitchell	Australia	10 July 1982	Gold Coast	11 April 2018	
68.57	Kathryn Mitchell	Australia	10 July 1982	Melbourne	3 March 2018	
68.34	Steffi Nerius	Germany	1 July 1972	Elstal (Berlin)	31 August 2008	
66.00	Steffi Nerius	Germany	1 July 1972	Elstal (Berlin)	31 August 2008	
66.00	Tatyana Shikolenko	Russia	10 May 1968	Tula	10 August 2003	
64.89	Yekaterina Ivakina	Russia	7 December 1964	Oslo	28 July 2000	
63.74	Yekaterina Ivakina	Russia	7 December 1964	Zagreb	3 July 2000	
63.22	Yekaterina Ivakina	Russia	7 December 1964	Saint Denis	23 June 2000	
63.12	Yekaterina Ivakina	Russia	7 December 1964	Saint Denis	23 June 2000	
62.50	Yekaterina Ivakina	Russia	7 December 1964	Tula	3 June 2000	
61.98	Sueli Pereira Dos Santos	Brazil	8 January 1965	Bogotá	6 May 2000	
57.73	Jette Jeppesen	Denmark	14 March 1964	Lahti	5 June 1999	

== Old javelin ==
Distance	Athlete	Nationality	Birthdate	Age	Location	Date	Ref
67.00 m	Tuula Laaksalo	Finland	21 April 1953	35 years, 142 days	Lappeenranta	10 September 1988	
