= Louise Currey =

Australian javelin thrower

Personal information
- Born: 24 January 1969 (age 57) Port Kembla, New South Wales, Australia

Sport
- Sport: Track and field
Medal record
Representing Australia
Olympic Games
Silver medal – second place	1996 Atlanta	Javelin throw
Commonwealth Games
Gold medal – first place	1994 Victoria	Javelin throw
Gold medal – first place	1998 Kuala Lumpur	Javelin throw

Louise Currey (née McPaul; born 24 January 1969) is a retired Australian track and field athlete. Originally a heptathlete, she later specialized in the javelin throw. She is married to fellow retired Australian javelin thrower Andrew Currey.

Currey won gold at the 1994 and 1998 Commonwealth Games, as well as a silver medal at the 1996 Olympics. Her personal best (new javelin) throw of 66.80 metres, achieved in 2000, was the Australian record until bested by Kim Mickle in 2014. Competing at her last competition, the 2000 Summer Olympics, she was knocked out in the qualifying round.

== Achievements ==
Year	Competition	Venue	Position	Event	Notes
Representing Australia
1986	World Junior Championships	Athens, Greece	13th	Heptathlon	5013 pts
1988	World Junior Championships	Sudbury, Canada	15th (q)	Javelin	47.94 m
1991	Universiade	Sheffield, United Kingdom	4th	Javelin	57.60 m
1991	World Championships	Tokyo, Japan	6th	Javelin	62.34 m
1992	Olympic Games	Barcelona, Spain	11th	Javelin	56.00 m
1994	Commonwealth Games	Victoria, Canada	1st	Javelin	63.76 m
1995	World Championships	Gothenburg, Sweden	14th (q)	Javelin	59.30 m
1996	Olympic Games	Atlanta, United States	2nd	Javelin	65.54 m
1998	Commonwealth Games	Kuala Lumpur, Malaysia	1st	Javelin	66.96 m
1999	World Championships	Seville, Spain	5th	Javelin	64.38 m
2000	Olympic Games	Sydney, Australia	31st (q)	Javelin	53.32 m
