= Trine Hattestad =

Norwegian javelin thrower (born 1966)

Personal information
- Born: Elsa Katrine Solberg; 18 April 1966 (age 60) Lørenskog, Norway
- Height: 173 cm (5 ft 8 in)
- Weight: 76 kg (168 lb)

Sport
- Country: Norway
- Sport: Track and field
- Event: Javelin throw

Achievements and titles
- Personal bests: NR 69.48 m (2000)
Medal record
Women's athletics
Representing Norway
Olympic Games
Gold medal – first place	2000 Sydney	Javelin
Bronze medal – third place	1996 Atlanta	Javelin
World Championships
Gold medal – first place	1993 Stuttgart	Javelin
Gold medal – first place	1997 Athens	Javelin
Bronze medal – third place	1999 Seville	Javelin
European Championships
Gold medal – first place	1994 Helsinki	Javelin

Elsa Katrine Hattestad (née Solberg; born 18 April 1966) is a retired Norwegian track and field athlete who competed in the javelin throw. During her career, she was a European, World, and Olympic Champion, and broke the world record twice. Her personal best, set in 2000, of 69.48 m is the Norwegian record. It also ranks her sixth on the overall list.

== Career ==
Hattestad made her international debut at a match between Norway, Sweden, and Finland. She competed at the 1981 European Junior Championships, finishing fifth. The following year, at the age of just 16, she competed in the European Championships for seniors, though she did not qualify for the final. She won her first national title in 1983 and would go on to win a total of 14.

She participated in both the 1984 and 1988 Summer Olympics.

In 1989, she was suspended after a positive doping test; however, her suspension was overturned, and she was cleared of doping. She argued that her hormonal contraception had caused the positive test and sued the Norwegian Athletics Association for loss of earnings during her suspension.

At the 1992 Summer Olympics, she came in fifth. In 1993, she won her first major international title, the World Championships in Stuttgart as well as the IAAF Golden Four. The next year, she added the 1994 European title.

After giving birth to her second child in 1995, she competed at the 1996 Atlanta Olympic Games, where she won the bronze medal. The following year, she won a second World title at the 1997 World Championships.

At the 1999 World Championships, she lost the title again, finishing third, but in 2000 she won the only title missing in her career with a gold medal at the Olympic Games in Sydney.

During her career, Hattestad had many injuries; she experienced fractures in both arms and required seven elbow surgeries.

== Personal life ==
Hattestad's parents were both handball players, and she took up the sport herself at age 6 and played for a 2nd division team. She began athletics when she was twelve; initially she competed in shot put, but she found javelin throwing more interesting.

She has four children with her former husband Anders Hattestad. They divorced in 2017.

== Competition record ==
*All results with the old model javelin unless noted.

Year	Competition	Venue	Position	Notes
Representing Norway
1983	European Junior Championships	Schwechat, Austria	2nd	61.40 m
1984	Olympic Games	Los Angeles, United States	5th	64.52 m
1986	European Championships	Stuttgart, West Germany	9th	59.52 m
1987	World Championships	Rome, Italy	24th (q)	55.30 m
1988	Olympic Games	Seoul, South Korea	18th (q)	58.82 m
1991	World Championships	Tokyo, Japan	5th	63.36 m
1992	Olympic Games	Barcelona, Spain	5th	63.54 m
1993	World Championships	Stuttgart, Germany	1st	69.18 m
1994	Goodwill Games	St. Petersburg, Russia	1st	65.74 m
1994	European Championships	Helsinki, Finland	1st	68.00 m
1996	Olympic Games	Atlanta, United States	3rd	64.98 m
1997	World Championships	Athens, Greece	1st	68.78 m
1998	European Championships	Budapest, Hungary	4th	63.16 m
1999	World Championships	Seville, Spain	3rd	66.06 m
2000	Olympic Games	Sydney, Australia	1st	68.91 m

Awards and achievements
Preceded by Gabriela Szabo	Women's European Athlete of the Year; 2000	Succeeded by Stephanie Graf
Sporting positions
Preceded by Petra Felke	Women's Javelin Best Year Performance; 1991	Succeeded by Natalya Shikolenko
Preceded by Natalya Shikolenko	Women's Javelin Best Year Performance; 1993	Succeeded by Natalya Shikolenko
Preceded by Steffi Nerius	Women's Javelin Best Year Performance; 1997	Succeeded by Tanja Damaske
Preceded by Tanja Damaske	Women's Javelin Best Year Performance; 1999 – 2000	Succeeded by Osleidys Menéndez
Awards
Preceded by Lasse Kjus	Norwegian Sportsperson of the Year; 2000	Succeeded by Olaf Tufte
