= Vijitha Amerasekera =

Sri Lankan javelin thrower

Personal information
- Full name: Vijitha Padmini Amerasekera
- Nationality: Sri Lankan
- Born: 30 December 1961 (age 64)
- Height: 170 cm (5 ft 7 in)
- Weight: 64 kg (141 lb)

Sport
- Sport: Athletics
- Event: Javelin throw

Vijitha Padmini Amerasekera (born 30 December 1961) is a Sri Lankan former athlete. She competed in the women's javelin throw at the 1992 Summer Olympics.
