= Isel López =

Cuban javelin thrower (born 1970)

Personal information
- Born: July 11, 1970 (age 56) Santiago de Cuba, Cuba

Sport
- Sport: Track and field
Medal record
Athletics
Representing Cuba
Summer Universiade
Gold medal – first place	1997 Catania	Javelin throw
Silver medal – second place	1991 Sheffield	Javelin throw
Central American and Caribbean Games
Gold medal – first place	1993 Ponce	Javelin throw
World Junior Championships
Silver medal – second place	1988 Sudbury	Javelin throw
CAC Junior Championships (U17)
Gold medal – first place	1986 Mexico City	Javelin throw

Isel López Rodríguez (born July 11, 1970) is a retired javelin thrower from Cuba. Her personal best throw is 61.66 metres, which she achieved in May 1999 in Havana.

== Achievements ==
Year	Competition	Venue	Position	Event	Notes
Representing Cuba
1986	Central American and Caribbean Junior Championships (U-17)	Mexico City, México	1st	Javelin	57.44 m A
1986	World Junior Championships	Athens, Greece	7th	Javelin	53.00 m
1988	World Junior Championships	Sudbury, Canada	2nd	Javelin	57.86 m
1991	Universiade	Sheffield, United Kingdom	2nd	Javelin	62.32 m
1991	World Championships	Tokyo, Japan	—	Javelin	NM
1992	Ibero-American Championships	Seville, Spain	2nd	Javelin	55.80 m
1992	Olympic Games	Barcelona, Spain	13th	Javelin	60.42 m
1993	Central American and Caribbean Games	Ponce, Puerto Rico	1st	Javelin	61.48 m
1995	Pan American Games	Mar del Plata, Argentina	4th	Javelin	57.26 m
1995	World Championships	Gothenburg, Sweden	7th	Javelin	60.80 m
1996	Olympic Games	Atlanta, United States	4th	Javelin	64.68 m
1997	Universiade	Catania, Italy	1st	Javelin	64.30 m
1998	Goodwill Games	Uniondale, United States	2nd	Javelin	63.72 m
