= Athletics at the 1995 Pan American Games – Women's javelin throw =

Women's javelin throw at the Pan American Games

The women's javelin throw event at the 1995 Pan American Games was held at the Estadio Atletico "Justo Roman" on 19 March. The old model javelin was used for this competition.

== Results ==
Rank	Name	Nationality	#1	#2	#3	#4	#5	#6	Result	Notes
1st place, gold medalist(s)	Xiomara Rivero	Cuba	56.72	59.02	62.52	61.92	63.92	60.78	63.92	
2nd place, silver medalist(s)	Laverne Eve	Bahamas	60.64	56.80	58.78	x	58.16	61.28	61.28	
3rd place, bronze medalist(s)	Valerie Tulloch	Canada	54.22	58.52	58.12	57.64	60.58	55.18	60.58	
4	Isel López	Cuba	55.88	x	56.42	x	54.06	57.26	57.26	
5	Paula Berry	United States	54.08	53.80	50.16	x	x	x	54.08	
6	Karen Wilkinson	Canada	49.70	50.10	50.20	50.94	48.94	x	50.94	
7	Lynda Lipson	United States	47.92	50.82	47.00	48.92	45.84	x	50.82	
8	Silvina Médici	Argentina	47.34	44.76	45.48	47.58	47.16	47.26	47.58	
9	Andrea Arch	Argentina	47.04	43.48	45.38				47.04	
10	Zoila Ayala	Paraguay	41.10	40.22	41.20				41.20	
