= Päivi Alafrantti =

Finnish javelin thrower

Personal information
- Born: 8 May 1964 (age 62) Tervola, Lapland, Finland

Sport
- Sport: Track and field
Medal record
Representing Finland
European Championships
Gold medal – first place	1990 Split	Javelin throw
Summer Universiade
Bronze medal – third place	1989 Duisburg	Javelin throw

Päivi Jaana Maarit Alafrantti (born 8 May 1964) is a retired female javelin thrower from Finland.

== Achievements ==
Year	Competition	Venue	Position	Notes
Representing Finland
1987	Universiade	Zagreb, Yugoslavia	11th (q)	51.70 m^{1}
1988	Olympic Games	Seoul, South Korea	10th	58.20 m
1989	Universiade	Duisburg, West Germany	3rd	61.76 m
1990	European Championships	Split, Yugoslavia	1st	67.68 m
1991	World Championships	Tokyo, Japan	8th	62.26 m
1992	Olympic Games	Barcelona, Spain	—	NM
1993	World Championships	Stuttgart, Germany	13th	59.26 m
1994	European Championships	Helsinki, Finland	18th	53.28 m

^{1}No mark in the final
