= Athletics at the 1996 Summer Olympics – Women's javelin throw =

Women's javelin throw at the Games of the XXVI Olympiad
- Pictogram for athletics
- Venue: Centennial Olympic Stadium
- Date: 26 July 1996 (qualifications); 27 July 1996 (finals)
- Competitors: 32 from 24 nations
- Winning distance: 67.94

Medalists
1st place, gold medalist(s)		Heli Rantanen; Finland
2nd place, silver medalist(s)		Louise McPaul; Australia
3rd place, bronze medalist(s)		Trine Hattestad; Norway

These are the official results of the Women's Javelin Throw at the 1996 Summer Olympics in Atlanta, Georgia.

== Medalists ==
Gold	Heli Rantanen; Finland
Silver	Louise McPaul; Australia
Bronze	Trine Hattestad; Norway

== Abbreviations ==
Q	automatic qualification
q	qualification by rank
DNS	did not start
NM	no mark
WR	world record
AR	area record
NR	national record
PB	personal best
SB	season best

== Records ==
Standing records prior to the 1996 Summer Olympics
World Record	Petra Felke (GDR)	80.00 m	September 9, 1988	Potsdam, East Germany
Olympic Record	Petra Felke (GDR)	74.68 m	September 26, 1988	Seoul, South Korea
Season Best	Felicia Ţilea-Moldovan (ROM)	69.26 m	June 28, 1996	Bergen, Norway

== Qualification ==
=== Group A ===
Rank	Overall	Athlete	Attempts			Distance	Note
Rank	Overall	Athlete	1	2	3	Distance	Note
1	3	Trine Hattestad (NOR)	64.52	—	—	64.52 m	
2	4	Natalya Shikolenko (BLR)	X	50.10	62.32	62.32 m	
3	7	Li Lei (CHN)	59.54	61.48	X	61.48 m	
4	8	Isel López (CUB)	60.12	61.40	X	61.40 m	
5	10	Steffi Nerius (GER)	X	56.82	60.98	60.98 m	
6	12	Mikaela Ingberg (FIN)	53.52	X	60.46	60.46 m	
7	14	Tessa Sanderson (GBR)	58.86	56.80	56.64	58.86 m	
8	15	Lee Young-Sun (KOR)	54.62	57.94	58.66	58.66 m	
9	16	Joanna Stone (AUS)	52.30	49.16	58.54	58.54 m	
10	18	Aysel Taş (TUR)	55.32	56.20	57.86	57.86 m	
11	19	Taina Uppa (FIN)	57.74	56.80	X	57.74 m	
12	21	Renata Strašek (SLO)	54.72	51.46	57.04	57.04 m	
13	23	Jette Jeppesen (DEN)	55.24	54.52	56.16	56.16 m	
14	24	Mirela Manjani (ALB)	X	X	55.64	55.64 m	
15	30	Erica Wheeler (USA)	53.34	49.54	52.72	53.34 m	
16	32	Iloai Suaniu (SAM)	X	38.08	X	38.08 m	
—	—	Sonya Radicheva (BUL)	—	—	—	DNS	

=== Group B ===
Rank	Overall	Athlete	Attempts			Distance	Note
Rank	Overall	Athlete	1	2	3	Distance	Note
1	1	Felicia Tilea (ROM)	58.84	X	66.94	66.94 m	
2	2	Heli Rantanen (FIN)	66.54	—	—	66.54 m	
3	5	Louise McPaul (AUS)	62.32	—	—	62.32 m	
4	6	Odelmys Palma (CUB)	62.30	54.76	X	62.30 m	
5	9	Xiomara Rivero (CUB)	X	52.84	61.32	61.32 m	
6	11	Karen Forkel (GER)	60.84	59.48	X	60.84 m	
7	13	Silke Renk (GER)	58.88	59.10	59.70	59.70 m	
8	17	Laverne Eve (BAH)	52.92	X	58.48	58.48 m	
9	20	Oksana Ovchinnikova (RUS)	X	57.28	X	57.28 m	
10	22	Rita Ramanauskaitė (LTU)	X	56.38	56.94	56.94 m	
11	25	Nikola Tomečková (CZE)	55.02	52.48	X	55.02 m	
12	26	Nicole Carroll (USA)	53.46	54.74	52.18	54.74 m	
13	27	Shelley Holroyd (GBR)	53.46	52.72	54.72	54.72 m	
14	28	Zuleima Aramendiz (COL)	53.86	X	54.24	54.24 m	
15	29	Akiko Miyajima (JPN)	49.58	53.18	53.98	53.98 m	
16	31	Nadine Auzeil (FRA)	52.76	52.66	50.84	52.76 m	

== Final ==
Rank	Athlete	Attempts						Distance	Note
Rank	Athlete	1	2	3	4	5	6	Distance	Note
1st place, gold medalist(s)	Heli Rantanen (FIN)	67.94	64.72	63.84	62.60	63.82	59.18	67.94 m	
2nd place, silver medalist(s)	Louise McPaul (AUS)	61.72	62.74	64.18	59.76	63.34	65.54	65.54 m	
3rd place, bronze medalist(s)	Trine Hattestad (NOR)	61.42	60.78	X	58.66	62.74	64.98	64.98 m	
4	Isel López (CUB)	X	63.50	57.98	X	64.68	X	64.68 m	
5	Xiomara Rivero (CUB)	X	61.94	62.76	X	64.48	61.60	64.48 m	
6	Karen Forkel (GER)	56.50	59.20	64.18	58.70	62.04	62.42	64.18 m	
7	Mikaela Ingberg (FIN)	X	61.52	X	60.30	X	X	61.52 m	
8	Li Lei (CHN)	X	56.96	60.74	59.56	58.52	60.12	60.74 m	
9	Steffi Nerius (GER)	57.88	60.20	59.78				60.20 m	
10	Felicia Tilea (ROU)	56.02	57.28	59.94				59.94 m	
11	Odelmys Palma (CUB)	X	59.70	57.50				59.70 m	
12	Natalya Shikolenko (BLR)	58.56	X	X				58.56 m	

== See also ==
- 1995 World Championships in Athletics – Women's javelin throw
- 1997 World Championships in Athletics – Women's javelin throw
