= Iloai Suaniu =

Samoan javelin thrower

Personal information
- Nationality: Samoan
- Born: 26 September 1978 (age 47)

Sport
- Sport: Athletics
- Event: Javelin throw

Iloai Suaniu (born 26 September 1978) is a Samoan athlete. She competed in the women's javelin throw at the 1996 Summer Olympics. She was the first woman to represent Samoa at the Olympics.
