= Lionel Smith (athlete) =

New Zealand hurdler

Lionel Hill-Smith
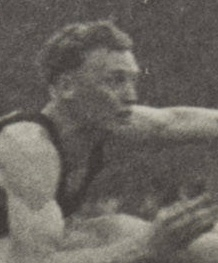
- Smith in 1950

Personal information
- Born: Lionel Robert Smith; 18 March 1929
- Died: 14 May 2025 (aged 96) Tauranga, New Zealand
- Occupation: Sales manager
- Spouse: Barbara Anne Smith
- Relative: Kirsten Hellier (daughter)

Sport
- Country: New Zealand
- Sport: Track and field

Achievements and titles
- National finals: 120 yd hurdles champion (1949); 220 yd hurdles champion (1949, 1950)

Lionel Robert Hill-Smith (né Smith; 18 March 1929 – 14 May 2025) was a New Zealand hurdler, who represented his country at the 1950 British Empire Games.

== Biography ==
Smith was educated at Hutt Valley High School in the 1940s, where he played in the school's 1st XV rugby union team at centre, alongside Ron Jarden.

Smith won the New Zealand national 120 yards hurdles title in 1949. He also won the national 220 yards hurdles championship in 1949 and 1950. At the 1950 British Empire Games in Auckland, he finished third in the second heat of the 120 yards hurdles. In the final, he placed sixth.

Hill-Smith's daughter is the New Zealand athlete and coach Kirsten Hellier. He died in Tauranga on 14 May 2025, at the age of 96.
