= Kirsten Hellier =

New Zealand javelin thrower (born 1969)

Kirsten Hellier ONZM
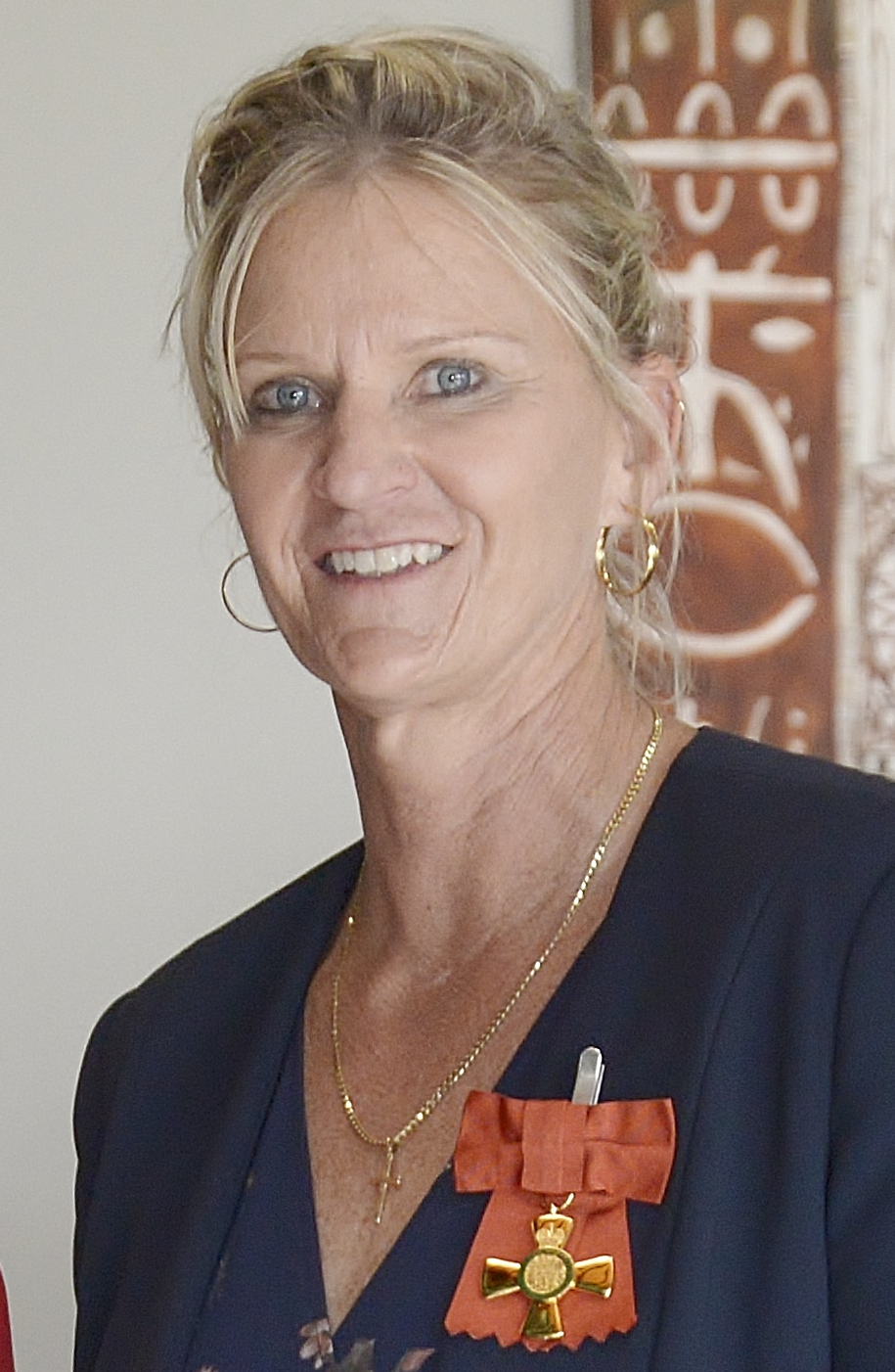
- Hellier in 2018

Personal information
- Born: Kirsten Louise Smith; 6 October 1969 (age 57) Tokoroa, New Zealand
- Relative: Lionel Smith (father)
Medal record
Women's Athletics
Representing New Zealand
Commonwealth Games
Silver medal – second place	1994 Victoria	Javelin throw

Kirsten Louise Hellier ONZM (née Smith; born 6 October 1969) is a former javelin thrower, who represented New Zealand at the Commonwealth and the Olympic Games. She set her personal best (62.52 metres) in 1994 with the old javelin type. Hellier was the coach of World Champion shot putter Valerie Adams from 1998 until 2010.

== Biography ==
Hellier was born in Tokoroa. Her father, Lionel Smith, was a hurdler at the 1950 British Empire Games. From age five to eleven, her family lived in Samoa where her father was a construction worker. Having lived in Samoa later helped with understanding cultural issues when it came to coaching Adams.

Hellier placed eighth at the 1990 Commonwealth Games in the women's javelin throw. She competed in the same event at the 1992 Summer Olympics where she placed 17th overall in qualifying with a throw of 59.34 m. At the 1994 Commonwealth Games, she won the silver medal in the women's javelin with a throw of 60.40 m. Hellier was trained by the decathlete Max Stewart.

Hellier currently works at Macleans College as a sports co-coordinator.

In 1990, Hellier was awarded the New Zealand 1990 Commemoration Medal. She won the Halberg Awards Coach of the Year in 2007 and 2008.

In the 2018 Queen's Birthday Honours, Hellier was appointed an Officer of the New Zealand Order of Merit, for services to sport, particularly athletics.

In 2020, Hellier was appointed to Athletics New Zealand in a key coaching role as Athletic NZ Programme Coach. An interview with Hellier was featured in the 2022 documentary film Dame Valerie Adams: More than Gold.

== Achievements ==
Year	Competition	Venue	Position	Notes
Representing New Zealand
1988	World Junior Championships	Sudbury, Canada	11th	47.66 m
1990	Commonwealth Games	Auckland, New Zealand	8th	52.34 m
1992	Olympic Games	Barcelona, Spain	17th	59.34 m
1994	Commonwealth Games	Victoria, Canada	2nd	60.40 m
