= Erica Wheeler (javelin thrower) =

American javelin thrower

Personal information
- Nationality: American
- Born: November 28, 1967 (age 58) Pretoria, South Africa

Sport
- Sport: Athletics
- Event: Javelin throw

Erica Wheeler (born November 28, 1967) is an American athlete. She competed in the women's javelin throw at the 1996 Summer Olympics.

Wheeler was an All-American thrower for the Stanford Cardinal track and field team, finishing runner-up in the javelin at the 1988 NCAA Division I Outdoor Track and Field Championships.
