= Natalya Cherniyenko =

Ukrainian javelin thrower

Personal information
- Born: 1 October 1965 (age 60)

Sport
- Sport: Track and field
Medal record
Representing Soviet Union
European Junior Championships
Gold medal – first place	1983 Schwechat	Javelin throw

Natalya Cherniyenko (born 1 October 1965) is a Ukrainian female former track and field athlete who competed in the javelin throw for the Soviet Union. She was the gold medallist at the 1983 European Athletics Junior Championships. She later represented her country at senior level at the 1990 European Athletics Championships and the 1991 World Championships in Athletics, finishing fourth at the latter event. She achieved a personal best of 67.88 m (222 ft 8 1/4 in) in 1990 which ranked her fifth globally and third among Europeans for the season.

== International competitions ==
Year	Competition	Venue	Position	Event	Notes
1983	European Junior Championships	Schwechat, Austria	1st	Javelin throw	62.04 m
1990	European Championships	Split, Yugoslavia	13th (q)	Javelin throw	57.46 m
1991	World Championships	Tokyo, Japan	4th	Javelin throw	65.22 m
