= Paula Berry =

American javelin thrower (born 1969)

Personal information
- Born: February 18, 1969 (age 57) John Day, Oregon, United States

Sport
- Sport: Track and field
Medal record
Representing United States
Summer Universiade
Bronze medal – third place	1991 Sheffield	Javelin throw

Paula Lynette Berry (born February 18, 1969) is a retired javelin thrower from the United States. She represented her native country at the 1992 Summer Olympics, finishing in 23rd place in the final rankings. She set her personal best (61.60 metres) on May 23, 1991, in Eugene, Oregon with the old javelin type. Inducted later at the University of Oregon's Athletic "Hall of Fame", she currently coaches track at Bucknell University in Pennsylvania.

== International competitions ==
Year	Competition	Venue	Position	Notes
Representing the United States
1988	World Junior Championships	Sudbury, Ontario, Canada	18th (q)	45.16 m
1991	Universiade	Sheffield, United Kingdom	3rd	58.28 m
1992	Olympic Games	Barcelona, Spain	23rd (q)	49.00 m
1995	Pan American Games	Mar del Plata, Argentina	5th	54.08 m
