= Yekaterina Ivakina =

Russian javelin thrower

Yekaterina Vladimirovna Ivakina (Russian: Екатерина Владимировна Ивакина; born 7 December 1964 in Stavropol) is a female javelin thrower from Russia. She was born Yekaterina Slyadneva, and has previously been married Yekaterina Krasnikova. Her personal best throw is 64.89 metres, achieved in July 2000 in Oslo. That mark was the last of 5 Masters W35 World Records she set during a two-month period of time during the summer of 2000. The record lasted for over three years before it was surpassed by another Russian Tatyana Shikolenko.

== International competitions ==
Representing Russia
Year	Competition	Venue	Position	Event	Result	Notes
1993	World Championships	Stuttgart, Germany	5th	Javelin throw	65.12 m	
1994	European Championships	Helsinki, Finland	15th	Javelin throw	54.86 m	
1995	World Championships	Gothenburg, Sweden	8th	Javelin throw	59.82 m	
2000	Olympic Games	Sydney, Australia	24th	Javelin throw	55.58 m	
2000	IAAF Grand Prix Final	Doha, Qatar	8th	Javelin throw	59.23 m	
2004	Olympic Games	Athens, Greece	—	Javelin throw	NM	
