= Nicole Carroll =

American javelin thrower (born 1968)

Personal information
- Born: April 18, 1968 (age 58) San Francisco, California, United States

Sport
- Sport: Track and field

Nicole C. Carroll-Lewis (born April 18, 1968) is an American track and field athlete known for the javelin throw. She competed for USA at the 1996 Olympics after qualifying on the last throw. She is a two time American Champion in the event in 1996 and 1998.

Carroll went to Alameda High School, where she was merely a 30 ft 0 in (9.14 m) shot putter and 100 ft 0 in (30.48 m) discus thrower. She took up javelin at the College of San Mateo after encouragement from Mike Lewis, a friend of her father, a San Francisco firefighter. Lewis continued as her coach and later, her husband. She won the CCCAA Championship in 1989. She continued at Fresno State, winning the 1990 Big West Conference Championship. After college, she threw for the Olympic Club. She only finished fifth at the 1995 National Championships but her personal best of 205 ft 10 in (62.73 m) was the second best qualifying mark in the country. That mark qualified her to the 1995 World Championships.

She was inducted into the inaugural class of the College of San Mateo Athletics Hall of Fame in 2011.
