= Genowefa Patla =

Polish javelin thrower

Personal information
- Born: October 17, 1962 (age 63) Jeżowe, Podkarpackie, Poland

Sport
- Sport: Track and field

Genowefa Olejarz-Patla (born October 17, 1962) is a former javelin thrower from Poland, who represented her native country at the 1992 Summer Olympics in Barcelona, Spain. She set her personal best (65.96 m) in the women's javelin throw event in 1991.

== Achievements ==
| Year | Competition | Venue | Position | Notes |
Representing Poland
| 1986 | European Championships | Stuttgart, West Germany | 5th | 63.34 m |
| 1989 | Universiade | Duisburg, West Germany | 6th | 55.37 m |
| 1991 | World Championships | Tokyo, Japan | 14th (q) | 60.18 m |
| 1992 | Olympic Games | Barcelona, Spain | 19th (q) | 58.18 m |
| 1999 | World Championships | Seville, Spain | 13th (q) | 59.50 m |
