= Felicia Țilea-Moldovan =

Romanian javelin thrower (1967–2025)

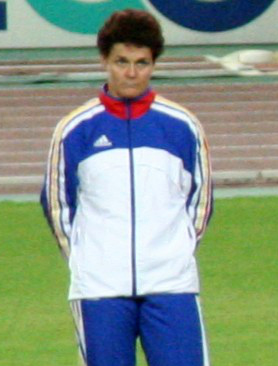
- Țilea-Moldovan in 2007

Personal information
- Born: 29 September 1967 Măgura Ilvei, Romania
- Died: 3 March 2025 (aged 57) Pontevedra, Spain

Sport
- Sport: Track and field
Medal record
Representing Romania
World Championships
Silver medal – second place	1995 Gothenburg	Javelin throw
European Championships
Bronze medal – third place	1994 Helsinki	Javelin throw
Summer Universiade
Gold medal – first place	1995 Fukuoka	Javelin throw

Felicia Țilea-Moldovan, (née Felicia Țilea, 29 September 1967 – 3 March 2025) was a Romanian javelin thrower. She was a four-time Olympian, and winner of the gold medal at the 1995 Summer Universiade in Japan. Her personal best throw was 63.89 metres. Țilea-Moldovan died in Pontevedra on 3 March 2025, at the age of 57.

== Achievements ==
Year	Competition	Venue	Position	Notes
Representing Romania
1990	European Championships	Split, Yugoslavia	—	DQ
1993	World Championships	Stuttgart, Germany	8th	61.24 m
1994	European Championships	Helsinki, Finland	3rd	64.34 m
1995	World Student Games	Fukuoka, Japan	1st	62.16 m
1995	World Championships	Gothenburg, Sweden	2nd	65.22 m
1996	Olympic Games	Atlanta, United States	10th	59.94 m
1997	World Championships	Athens, Greece	5th	64.90 m
1998	European Championships	Budapest, Hungary	10th	58.30 m
1999	World Championships	Seville, Spain	11th	59.24 m
2000	Olympic Games	Sydney, Australia	15th	58.75 m
2001	World Championships	Edmonton, Canada	16th	56.61 m
2002	European Championships	Munich, Germany	9th	58.88 m
2005	World Championships	Helsinki, Finland	23rd	54.68 m
2006	European Championships	Gothenburg, Sweden	16th	57.21 m

== Sources ==
- Felicia Țilea-Moldovan at World Athletics
- Felicia Țilea-Moldovan at Tilastopaja (registration required)
- Felicia Țilea-Moldovan at Athletics Podium
- Felicia Țilea-Moldovan at the Romanian Olympic and Sports Committee (archived) (in Romanian)
- Felicia Țilea-Moldovan at Olympedia
- Felicia Țilea-Moldovan at InterSportStats
