= Heli Rantanen =

Finnish javelin thrower (born 1970)

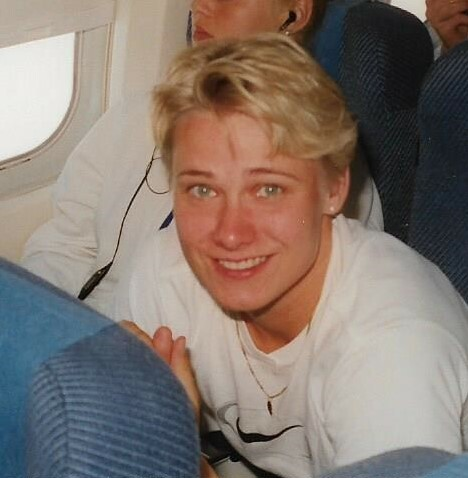
- Rantanen in 1998

Personal information
- Full name: Heli Orvokki Rantanen
- Nickname: Lammin likka
- Born: 26 February 1970 (age 56) Lammi, Finland
- Height: 174 cm (5 ft 9 in)
- Weight: 68–70 kg (150–154 lb)
Medal record
Women's athletics
Representing Finland
Olympic Games
Gold medal – first place	1996 Atlanta	Javelin throw

Heli Orvokki Rantanen (born 26 February 1970) is a retired Finnish track and field athlete who competed in the javelin throw. She won the gold medal at the 1996 Summer Olympics, setting a new personal best of 67.94 in the first round. She is the first Nordic woman to become an Olympic Champion in athletics.

== Achievements ==
Year	Competition	Venue	Position	Notes
Representing Finland
1990	European Championships	Split, Yugoslavia	19th	54.02 m
1992	Olympic Games	Barcelona, Spain	6th	62.34 m
1993	World Championships	Stuttgart, Germany	11th	53.14 m
1995	World Championships	Gothenburg, Sweden	4th	65.04 m
1996	Olympic Games	Atlanta, United States	1st	67.94 m
1997	World Championships	Athens, Greece	10th	62.64 m
1998	European Championships	Budapest, Hungary	5th	62.34 m
