= Natalya Shikolenko =

Belarusian javelin thrower (1964–2025)

Personal information
- Nationality: Belarusian
- Born: 1 August 1964 Andizhan, Uzbek SSR, USSR
- Died: 15 May 2025 (aged 60)
- Height: 1.82 m (5 ft 11 1/2 in)
- Weight: 70 kg (154 lb)

Sport
- Country: Soviet Union (1987–1991); Unified Team (1992); Belarus (1993–1996)
- Sport: Athletics
- Event: Javelin throw

Achievements and titles
- Personal best: 71.40 m (1994)
Medal record
Women's Athletics
Representing Unified Team
Olympic Games
Silver medal – second place	1992 Barcelona	Javelin throw
Representing Belarus
World Championships
Gold medal – first place	1995 Gothenburg	Javelin
Bronze medal – third place	1993 Stuttgart	Javelin

Natalya Shikolenko (Belarusian: Натальля Шыкаленка; 1 August 1964 – 15 May 2025) was a javelin thrower who represented the Soviet Union and later Belarus. She won an Olympic silver medal and a World Championship gold.

Shikolenko died on 15 May 2025, at the age of 60. Her sister Tatyana Shikolenko is also a successful javelin thrower, first representing Belarus but switching to Russia in 1996.

== Achievements ==
Year	Competition	Venue	Position	Event	Notes
Representing the Soviet Union
1987	World Championships	Rome, Italy	14th (q)	Javelin	60.40 m
1990	Goodwill Games	Seattle, United States	1st	Javelin	61.62 m
1990	European Championships	Split, Yugoslavia	12th	Javelin	53.98 m
1991	World Championships	Tokyo, Japan	11th	Javelin	58.82 m
Representing Unified Team
1992	Olympic Games	Barcelona, Spain	2nd	Javelin	68.26 m
Representing Belarus
1993	World Championships	Stuttgart, Germany	3rd	Javelin	65.64 m
1994	European Championships	Helsinki, Finland	14th (q)	Javelin	55.08 m
1995	World Championships	Gothenburg, Sweden	1st	Javelin	67.56 m
1996	Olympic Games	Atlanta, United States	12th	Javelin	58.56 m

Sporting positions
Preceded by (Norway) Trine Hattestad	Women's Javelin Best Year Performance; 1992	Succeeded by (Norway) Trine Hattestad
Preceded by (Norway) Trine Hattestad	Women's Javelin Best Year Performance; 1994 – 1995	Succeeded by (Germany) Steffi Nerius
