= Shelley Holroyd =

British Olympic Javelin thrower

Shelley Holroyd OLY
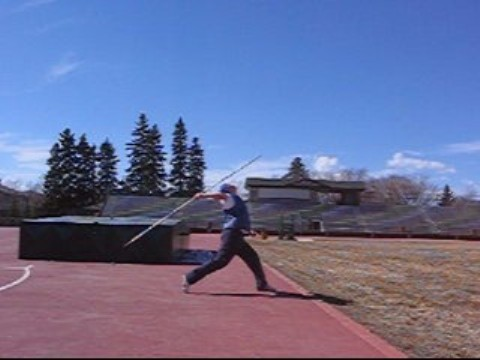

Personal information
- Full name: Shelley Ann Holroyd
- Nationality: British (English)
- Born: 17 May 1973 (age 53) Salford, England
- Height: 178 cm (5 ft 10 in)
- Weight: 72 kg (159 lb)

Sport
- Sport: Athletics
- Events: Javelin
- Club: Essex Ladies Athletic Club; Sale Harriers; Chafford Hundred
- Turned pro: 1993
- Coached by: William Nicholls (1986–1993), Fatima Whitbread (1993–1995)
- Retired: 2006 due to injury

Achievements and titles
- Olympic finals: 23rd
- World finals: 16th 1993 World Championships
- Regional finals: 1st
- National finals: 1st
- Highest world ranking: 4th
- Personal bests: Official Javelin: 60.12 m (unofficial 65.40 & Standing throw 52 m)

Shelley Ann Holroyd (born 17 May 1973) is a British Olympic javelin thrower.

== Athletics career ==
Holroyd was the sixth British javelin thrower to throw over 60 metres (1993) and the first thrower to reach an Olympic Games since Tessa Sanderson. At the age of 23 she had already competed in every major championship. She started throwing at the age of 12 and at 13 threw 37m58cm with the 600g javelin to win the English Schools Championships. At the age of 16 Holroyd threw 52m50 and became a senior international athlete. In 1992 she broke the English Schools record with 56m50 and it is still the longest throw in the history of the English Schools female javelin. Later that year Holroyd was picked for the GB Junior team and subsequently came fourth at the World Junior Championships (1992) and was ranked Britain's number one thrower. In 1993 Holroyd threw 60m10cm to win the World Championship Trials and qualified for the World Championships, Stuttgart.

Noted sponsors as a junior were Reebok, British Gas & Apollo Javelins

In March 1995 Holroyd was involved in a car accident that was deemed to be the end of her throwing career but she overcame her injuries to start training in July the same year. In December she was involved in a freak training accident and broke her right elbow. Once again the injury threatened her career. February 1996 saw Holroyd come back from her injury and in July 1996 she qualified for the 1996 Great Britain Olympic team.

At the 1997 World Championships in Athens Holroyd became ill during the competition after having an allergic reaction to an injection and had to pull out. It was another year plagued with injuries. She represented England in the javelin, at the 1998 Commonwealth Games in Kuala Lumpur, Malaysia. Eight years later she competed in the javelin again at the 2006 Commonwealth Games.

After a 17-year spell as an international athlete Holroyd retired in 2006 due to injury and moved into coaching.

== Achievements ==
Year	Competition	Venue	Position	Notes
Representing Great Britain and England
1992	World Junior Championships	Seoul, South Korea	4th	57.08 m
1993	World Championships	Stuttgart, Germany	16th	57.66 m
1994	European Championships	Helsinki, Finland	21st	51.26 m
1996	Olympic Games	Atlanta, Georgia, USA	27th	54.72 m

- 1989 European Junior Championships (Varaždin, Yugoslavia)
- 1991 European Junior Championships (Thessaloniki, Greece) 7th
- 1994 Commonwealth Games (Victoria, British Columbia, Canada) Withdrew due to illness
- 1997 World Championships (Athens, Greece)
- 1998 Commonwealth Games (Kuala Lumpur, Malaysia) 5th
- 2006 Commonwealth Games (Melbourne, Australia) 10th

== Domestic championships ==
- English Schools Champion 1986, 1991, 1992
- North of England Champion 1991, 1992, 1993, 2005
- UK Championships 1989 3rd, 1992 2nd, 1997 2nd
- AAAs Champion 1993, 1994, 1998, 2005, 2004
