= Brigitte Graune =

German javelin thrower (born 1961)

Personal information
- Born: 14 March 1961 (age 65) Blender, West Germany

Sport
- Sport: Track and field
Medal record
Representing West Germany
Summer Universiade
Silver medal – second place	1989 Duisburg	Javelin throw
Bronze medal – third place	1987 Zagreb	Javelin throw

Brigitte Graune (born 14 March 1961) is a retired West German javelin thrower. Her personal best throw was 64.94 metres with the old javelin type, achieved in July 1989 in Dortmund.

She won the bronze medal at the 1987 Summer Universiade, won the silver medal at the 1989 Summer Universiade and finished eleventh at the 1990 European Championships.

She became West German champion in 1989 and 1990. She represented the clubs ASV Köln and LG Bayer Leverkusen.
