= Teresė Nekrošaitė =

Lithuanian javelin thrower (1961–2026)

Personal information
- Born: 19 October 1961 Bitvanas, Soviet Union
- Died: 17 June 2026 (aged 64)

Sport
- Sport: Track and field

Teresė Nekrošaitė (19 October 1961 – 17 June 2026) was a Lithuanian javelin thrower. She represented Lithuania at the 1992 Summer Olympics, finishing in 18th place in the final rankings. She set her personal best (67.68 metres) in 1992 with the old javelin type.

Nekrošaitė was born in Bitvanas, Kaunas District Municipality on 19 October 1961, and died on 17 June 2026, at the age of 64.

== Achievements ==
Year	Competition	Venue	Position	Notes
Representing Lithuania
1992	Olympic Games	Barcelona, Spain	18th	58.28 m
1993	World Championships	Stuttgart, Germany	12th	61.02 m
