= Kinga Zsigmond =

Hungarian javelin thrower

Kinga Zsigmond (born 19 April 1964 in Budapest) is a retired female javelin thrower from Hungary. She represented her native country at the 1992 Summer Olympics, finishing in tenth place in the final rankings. She set her personal best (63.90 metres) in 1992.

== Achievements ==
| Year | Competition | Venue | Position | Notes |
Representing Hungary
| 1992 | Olympic Games | Barcelona, Spain | 10th | 56.54 m |
| 1993 | World Championships | Stuttgart, Germany | 18th | 55.72 m |
| 1994 | European Championships | Helsinki, Finland | 7th | 59.74 m |
| 1995 | World Championships | Gothenburg, Sweden | 18th | 57.86 m |

== Awards ==
- Hungarian athlete of the Year (1): 1992
