= Jette Jeppesen =

Danish javelin thrower

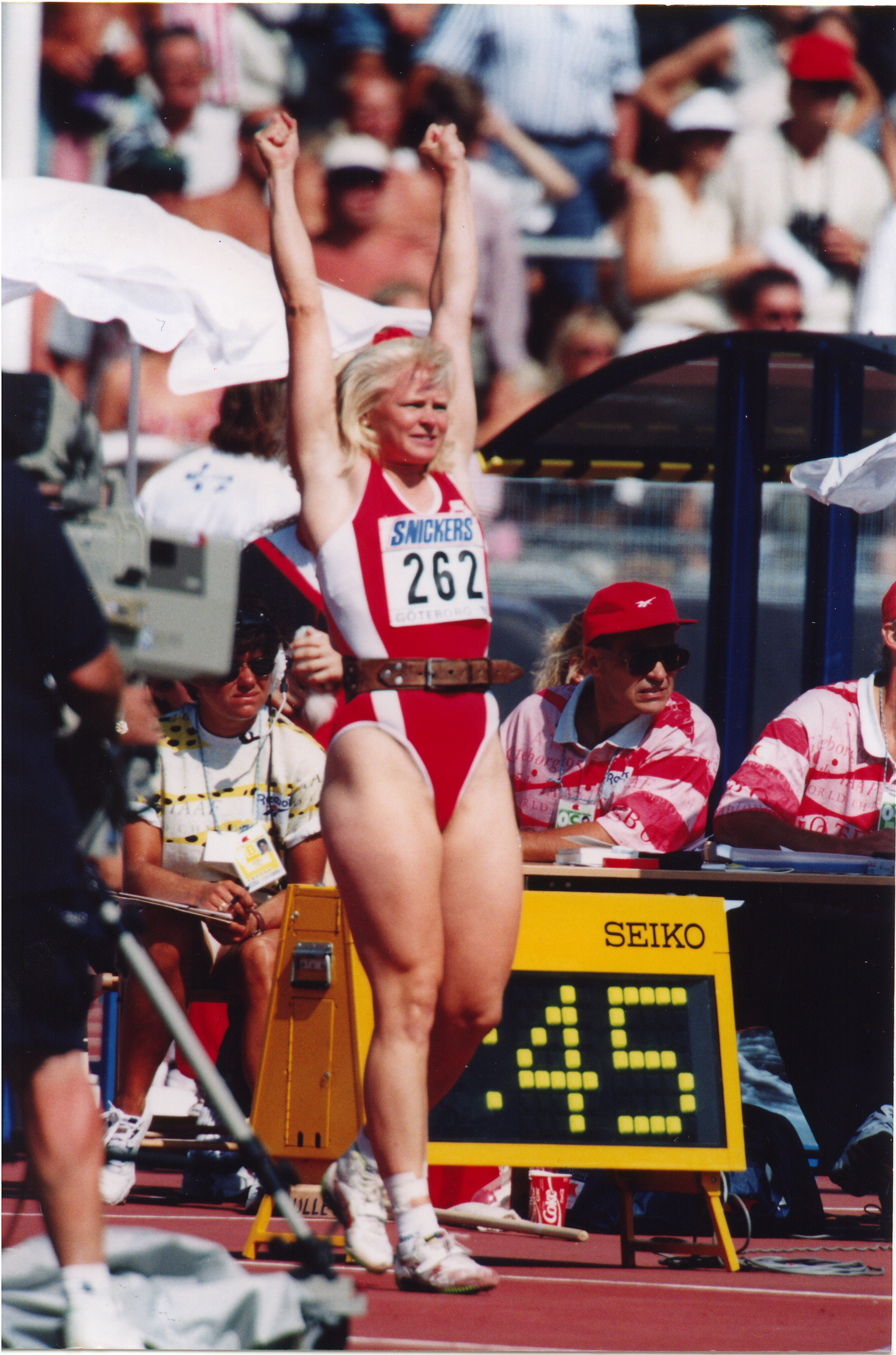
- Jette Jeppesen in 1995

Personal information
- Nationality: Danish
- Born: 14 March 1964 (age 62) Hjørring, Denmark
- Height: 172 cm (5 ft 8 in)
- Weight: 72 kg (159 lb)

Sport
- Sport: Athletics
- Event: Javelin throw
- Club: AK Delta Slagelse, Randers Freja, Aarhus 1900

Jette Ø. Jeppesen (born 14 March 1964) is a Danish athlete. She competed in the women's javelin throw at the 1996 Summer Olympics.

During the 1990's she was by far the best Danish javelin thrower, and won the Danish championship every year between 1988 and 1999.
