= Oksana Ovchinnikova =

Russian javelin thrower

Personal information
- Nationality: Russian
- Born: 21 July 1971 (age 54) Volgograd, Soviet Union

Sport
- Sport: Athletics
- Event: Javelin throw

Oksana Ovchinnikova (born 21 July 1971) is a Russian track and field athlete who competed in the javelin throw. She competed in the women's javelin throw at the 1996 Summer Olympics.
