= Nadine Auzeil =

French javelin thrower

Personal information
- Born: 19 August 1964 (age 62) Barr, Bas-Rhin, France

Sport
- Sport: Track and field
Medal record
Representing France
Mediterranean Games
Gold medal – first place	1997 Bari	Javelin throw
Silver medal – second place	1991 Athens	Javelin throw
Bronze medal – third place	1983 Casablanca	Javelin throw

Nadine Auzeil-Schoellkopf (born 19 August 1964) is a retired female javelin thrower from France. A three-time Olympian she set her personal best (62.16 metres) on 27 June 2000 in Strasbourg.

Her son, Bastien Auzeil, is a decathlete.

== International competitions ==
Year	Competition	Venue	Position	Notes
Representing France
1983	Mediterranean Games	Casablanca, Morocco	3rd	52.54 m
1987	Universiade	Zagreb, Yugoslavia	9th	52.40 m
1988	Olympic Games	Seoul, South Korea	—	NM
1990	European Championships	Split, FR Yugoslavia	16th (q)	56.88 m
1991	Mediterranean Games	Athens, Greece	2nd	54.82 m
1991	Universiade	Sheffield, United Kingdom	8th	54.74 m
1993	Mediterranean Games	Narbonne, France	2nd	59.68 m
1994	Jeux de la Francophonie	Bondoufle, France	4th	55.80 m
1994	European Championships	Helsinki, Finland	13th (q)	55.12 m
1996	Olympic Games	Atlanta, United States	31st (q)	52.76 m
1997	Mediterranean Games	Bari, Italy	1st	57.32 m
1998	European Championships	Budapest, Hungary	19th (q)	52.21 m
1999	World Championships	Seville, Spain	20th (q)	57.33 m
2000	Olympic Games	Sydney, Australia	29th (q)	53.85 m
