= Joanna Stone =

Australian javelin thrower

Joanna "Jo" Stone-Nixon, née Stone, (4 October 1972 in London, England) is a retired javelin thrower, who represented Australia twice at the Summer Olympics, starting in 1996. She is best known for winning the silver medal at the 1997 World Championships in Athens, Greece. Stone was the appellant in an important High Court of Australia case on taxation law, Federal Commissioner of Taxation v Stone (2005) 59 ATR 50.

Stone-Nixon is now mother of two children, Ella Jane Nixon and James Edward Nixon. Her sporting career ended in early 2001, after her performance in the Sydney Olympic games in 2000, with a final throw of 54.34 metres.

== Achievements ==
Year	Competition	Venue	Position	Notes
Representing Australia
1994	Commonwealth Games	Victoria, Canada	4th	57.60 m
1995	World Championships	Gothenburg, Sweden	5th	63.74 m
1996	Olympic Games	Atlanta, United States	16th	58.54 m
1997	World Championships	Athens, Greece	2nd	68.64 m
1998	Commonwealth Games	Kuala Lumpur, Malaysia	DNS	
1998	IAAF World Cup	Johannesburg, South Africa	1st	69.85 m
2000	Olympic Games	Sydney, Australia	17th	58.34 m
