= Akiko Miyajima =

Japanese javelin thrower (born 1966)

Personal information
- Nationality: Japanese
- Born: 17 September 1966 (age 59) Toyama, Japan

Sport
- Sport: Athletics
- Event: Javelin throw

Akiko Miyajima (宮島 秋子, Miyajima Akiko; born 17 September 1966) is a Japanese track and field athlete. She competed in the women's javelin throw at the 1996 Summer Olympics.
