= Silke Renk =

German javelin thrower

Personal information
- Nationality: East Germany; Germany
- Born: 30 June 1967 (age 59) Querfurt, Bezirk Halle, East Germany
- Height: 1.73 m (5 ft 8 in)
- Weight: 71 kg (157 lb)

Sport
- Country: East Germany; Germany
- Sport: Athletics
- Event: Javelin throw
- Club: SC Chemie Halle

Achievements and titles
- Personal best: 71.00 (1988)
Medal record
Women's athletics
Representing Germany
Olympic Games
Gold medal – first place	1992 Barcelona	Javelin
World Championships
Bronze medal – third place	1991 Tokyo	Javelin
Representing East Germany
Universiade
Gold medal – first place	1989 Duisburg	Javelin

Silke Renk (born 30 June 1967 in Querfurt, Bezirk Halle) is a retired German javelin thrower.

She represented East Germany at the 1988 Summer Olympics, where she finished fifth, and at the 1990 European Championships where she finished fourth.

She then experienced her career highlight as she won the gold medal at the 1992 Summer Olympics in Barcelona, Spain. Renk won with a throw of 68.34 meters, defeating Natalya Shikolenko, who took home the silver medal, and compatriot Karen Forkel.

The next year she finished sixth at the 1993 World Championships. She withdrew from the 1994 European Championships because of knee injury problems, and never reached another international final despite starting at the 1995 World Championships and the 1996 Summer Olympics.

Her personal best was 71.00 metres with the old javelin type, achieved in June 1988 in Rostock. This ranks her third among German javelin throwers, only behind Petra Felke (who held the world record) and Antje Kempe.

== Achievements ==
Year	Competition	Venue	Position	Notes
Representing East Germany
1988	Olympic Games	Seoul, South Korea	5th	66.38 m
1990	European Championships	Split, Yugoslavia	4th	64.76 m
Representing Germany
1991	World Championships	Tokyo, Japan	3rd	66.80 m
1992	Olympic Games	Barcelona, Spain	1st	68.34 m
1993	World Championships	Stuttgart, Germany	6th	64.00 m
1996	Olympic Games	Atlanta, Georgia, United States	13th	59.70 m
