= Tanja Damaske =

German javelin thrower

Personal information
- Full name: Tanja Damaske
- Born: 16 November 1971 (age 54) East Berlin, East Germany
- Height: 1.77 m (5 ft 10 in)

Sport
- Country: Germany
- Sport: Athletics
- Events: Javelin throw, shot put

Achievements and titles
- Personal best: 66.91 m (1999)
Medal record
Women's athletics
Representing Germany
World Championships
Bronze medal – third place	1997 Athens	Javelin throw
European Championships
Gold medal – first place	1998 Budapest	Javelin throw
World Junior Championships
Gold medal – first place	1990 Plovdiv	Javelin throw
Summer Universiade
Silver medal – second place	1993 Buffalo	Javelin throw

Tanja Damaske (born 16 November 1971) is a retired German track and field athlete who competed in the javelin throw. She is best known for winning the gold medal at the 1998 European Championships. A year earlier she earned a bronze medal at the World Championships. A five-time German Champion in the women's javelin throw, she retired from competition in 2003.

Sporting positions
Preceded by Trine Hattestad	Women's Javelin Best Year Performance; 1998	Succeeded by Trine Hattestad
