= Slovenia at the 2025 World Athletics Championships =

- Flag of Slovenia
- WA code: SLO

in Tokyo, Japan 13 September 2025 – 21 September 2025
- Competitors: 10 (3 men and 7 women)
- Medals Ranked 41st: Gold 0 Silver 0 Bronze 1 Total 1

World Athletics Championships appearances
- 1993; 1995; 1997; 1999; 2001; 2003; 2005; 2007; 2009; 2011; 2013; 2015; 2017; 2019; 2022; 2023; 2025

Other related appearances
- Yugoslavia (1983–1991)

Slovenia competed at the 2025 World Athletics Championships in Tokyo, Japan, from 13 to 21 September 2025.

== Medallists ==
Medal	Athlete	Event	Date
Bronze	Tina Šutej	Women's pole vault	September 17

== Results ==
Slovenia entered 10 athletes to the championships: 7 women and 3 men.

Key

- Q = Qualified for the next round
- q = Qualified for the next round as a fastest loser or, in field events, by position without achieving the qualifying target
- NR = National record
- PB = Personal best
- SB = Season best
- N/A = Round not applicable for the event

=== Men ===
Track and road events

Athlete	Event	Heat		Semifinal		Final	
Athlete	Event	Result	Rank	Result	Rank	Result	Rank
Rok Ferlan	400 metres	44.91	5 q	45.71	8	Did not advance	
Matic Ian Guček	400 metres hurdles	48.92	4 Q	48.51	5	Did not advance	

Field events

Athlete	Event	Qualification		Final	
Athlete	Event	Distance	Position	Distance	Position
Kristjan Čeh	Discus throw	68.08	2 Q	63.07	8

=== Women ===
Track and road events

Athlete	Event	Heat		Semifinal		Final	
Athlete	Event	Result	Rank	Result	Rank	Result	Rank
Anita Horvat	800 metres	2:00.66	6	Did not advance			
Klara Lukan	10,000 metres	—N/a				31:49.76	15
Anja Fink	Marathon	—N/a				2:59:31 SB	61
Nika Glojnarič	100 metres hurdles	13.13	5	Did not advance			

Field events

Athlete	Event	Qualification		Final	
Athlete	Event	Distance	Position	Distance	Position
Lia Apostolovski	High jump	1.83	27	Did not advance	
Tina Šutej	Pole vault	4.60	1 q	4.80 SB	3rd place, bronze medalist(s)
Neja Filipič	Triple jump	14.05	11 q	14.03	9
