= Yainelis Ribeaux =

Cuban javelin thrower

Personal information
- Full name: Yainelis Ribeaux Rustafull
- Born: 30 December 1987 (age 38) Songo – La Maya, Santiago de Cuba, Cuba

Sport
- Country: Cuba
- Sport: Athletics
- Event: Javelin
Medal record
Pan American Games
Silver medal – second place	2011 Guadalajara	Javelin throw
- Updated on 27 June 2013

Yainelis Ribeaux Rustafull (or Yainelis Riveaux Rustaful, born 30 December 1987) is a Cuban track and field athlete who competes in the javelin throw. She was the 2009 Central American and Caribbean Champion in the event and runner-up at the 2011 Pan American Games. She represented Cuba at the 2009 World Championships in Athletics and the 2012 Summer Olympics. Her personal best is 63.18 metres.

Born in Songo – La Maya, Santiago de Cuba, Ribeaux started out in the javelin throw as a teenager, clearing fifty metres for the first time in 2005 and setting a best of 55.34 m a year later. She established herself at the national level in 2009 when she improved her best by more than five metres to win at the Barrientos Memorial. Her mark of 61.72 m was enough to defeat former Olympic champion Osleidys Menéndez. She threw the javelin 63.18 m later that season and was the gold medallist at the 2009 Central American and Caribbean Championships in Athletics ahead of perennial champion Laverne Eve. She was elected to compete at the 2009 World Championships in Athletics but did not progress beyond the qualifying round.

In 2010, she only cleared sixty metres once with her season's best of 60.88 m. She was runner-up at the Barrientos Memorial and Olimpiada del Deporte Cubano that year in Cuba, and was the representative for the Americas at the 2010 IAAF Continental Cup, where she came seventh. She won the Barrientos meet the following season and defeated Leryn Franco to win the javelin title at the 2011 ALBA Games. A throw of 62.30 m in August (her second best at that point) preceded her appearance at the 2011 Pan American Games. There she took the silver medal, ahead of national rival Yanet Cruz but behind American Alicia DeShasier.

She broke the meet record at the 2012 Ponce Grand Prix and a throw of 60.70 m, as well as a win at the IAAF Centenary meet in Havana, was enough to gain selection for the Cuban team at the 2012 London Olympics.

== Personal best ==
- Javelin throw: 63.18 m – Havana, Cuba, 19 June 2009

== Achievements ==
Year	Competition	Venue	Position	Event	Notes
Representing Cuba
2009	ALBA Games	Havana, Cuba	3rd	Javelin throw	55.65 m
2009	Central American and Caribbean Championships	Havana, Cuba	2nd	Javelin throw	59.68 m
2009	World Championships	Berlin, Germany	16th (q)	Javelin throw	57.38 m
2011	ALBA Games	Barquisimeto, Venezuela	1st	Javelin throw	58.93 m
2011	Pan American Games	Guadalajara, Mexico	2nd	Javelin throw	56.21 m A
2012	Olympic Games	London, United Kingdom	29th (q)	Javelin throw	56.55 m
