= Slovenia at the 2005 World Championships in Athletics =

Slovenia at the 2005 World Athletics Championships
- WA code: SLO
- National federation: Athletics Federation of Slovenia
- Website: www.atletska-zveza.si (in Slovenian)

in Helsinki
- Competitors: 8 (4 men and 4 women) in 10 events
- Medals: Gold 0 Silver 0 Bronze 0 Total 0

World Athletics Championships appearances
- 1993; 1995; 1997; 1999; 2001; 2003; 2005; 2007; 2009; 2011; 2013; 2015; 2017; 2019; 2022; 2023; 2025

Other related appearances
- Yugoslavia (1983–1991)

Slovenia competed at the 2005 World Championships in Athletics held in Helsinki, Finland, from 6–14 August 2005. The country was represented by eight athletes, four men and four women.

== Results ==
Key

- Q = Qualified for the next round
- q = Qualified for the next round as a fastest loser or, in field events, by position without achieving the qualifying target
- NR = National record
- PB = Personal best
- SB = Season's best
- N/A = Round not applicable for the event

=== Men ===
Track and road events

Athlete	Event	Heats		Quarterfinals		Semifinal		Final
Athlete	Event	Result	Rank	Result	Rank	Result	Rank	Rank
Matic Osovnikar	100m	10.40	4	10.48	7	Did not advance		
Matic Osovnikar	200m	20.94	5	Did not advance				
Boštjan Buč	3000m Steeplechase	N/A		8:40.81	8	Did not advance		

Field events

Athlete	Event	Qualification		Final	
Athlete	Event	Distance	Position	Distance	Position
Jure Rovan	Pole Vault	5.30	11 Group B	Did not advance	
Miran Vodovnik	Shot Put	19.28	10 Group A	Did not advance	

=== Women ===
Track and road events

Athlete	Event	Heat		Quarterfinals		Semifinal		Final
Athlete	Event	Result	Rank	Result	Rank	Result	Rank	Rank
Alenka Bikar	100m	11.68	5 q	11.69	8	Did not advance		
Alenka Bikar	200m	N/A		23.77	5 q	23.94	8	Did not advance
Brigita Langerholc	800m	N/A		2:03.06	6	Did not advance		

Field events

Athlete	Event	Qualification		Final	
Athlete	Event	Distance	Position	Distance	Position
Teja Melink	Pole Vault	4.00	13 Group B	Did not advance	
Snežana Vukmirovič	Triple Jump	13.88	7 Group B	Did not advance	
