= Slovenia at the 2019 World Athletics Championships =

- WA code: SLO
- National federation: Athletics Federation of Slovenia
- Website: www.atletska-zveza.si (in Slovenian)

in Doha
- Competitors: 9 (7 women and 2 men) in 11 events
- Medals: Gold 0 Silver 0 Bronze 0 Total 0

World Athletics Championships appearances
- 1993; 1995; 1997; 1999; 2001; 2003; 2005; 2007; 2009; 2011; 2013; 2015; 2017; 2019; 2022; 2023; 2025

Other related appearances
- Yugoslavia (1983–1991)

Slovenia competed at the 2019 World Athletics Championships held in Doha, Qatar, from 27 September to 6 October 2019. The country was represented by nine athletes, seven women and two men.

== Results ==
Key

- Q = Qualified for the next round
- q = Qualified for the next round as a fastest loser or, in field events, by position without achieving the qualifying target
- NR = National record
- PB = Personal best
- SB = Season's best
- N/A = Round not applicable for the event

=== Men ===
Track and road events

Athlete	Event	Heat		Semifinal		Final	
Athlete	Event	Result	Rank	Result	Rank	Result	Rank
Luka Janežič	400m	46.84	6	Did not advance			

Field events

Athlete	Event	Qualification		Final	
Athlete	Event	Distance	Position	Distance	Position
Kristjan Čeh	Discus Throw	59.55	31	Did not advance	

=== Women ===
Track and road events

Athlete	Event	Heat		Semifinal		Final	
Athlete	Event	Result	Rank	Result	Rank	Result	Rank
Maja Mihalinec	100m	11.32	5	Did not advance			
Maja Mihalinec	200m	22.78 PB	4 q	22.81	4	Did not advance	
Anita Horvat	400m	52.73	4	Did not advance			
Maruša Mišmaš	1500m	4:14.94	11	Did not advance			
Maruša Mišmaš	3000m Steeplechase	9:29.68	3 Q	N/A		9:25.80	12

Field events

Athlete	Event	Qualification		Final	
Athlete	Event	Distance	Position	Distance	Position
Maruša Černjul	High Jump	1.89	16	Did not advance	
Tina Šutej	Pole Vault	4.60	17 Q	4.50	=13
Barbara Špiler	Hammer Throw	65.76	27	Did not advance	
Martina Ratej	Javelin Throw	62.87	4 q	58.98	10
