= Athletics at the 2015 Pan American Games – Women's javelin throw =

Women's javelin throw at the 2015 Pan American Games
- Venue: CIBC Pan Am and Parapan Am Athletics Stadium
- Dates: July 21
- Competitors: 10 from 7 nations
- Winning distance: 62.83 m

Medalists
Gold medal	Elizabeth Gleadle	Canada
Silver medal	Kara Winger	United States
Bronze medal	Jucilene de Lima	Brazil

The women's javelin throw's javelin throw competition of the athletics events at the 2015 Pan American Games took place on July 21 at the CIBC Pan Am and Parapan Am Athletics Stadium. The defending Pan American Games champion is Alicia DeShasier of the United States.

== Records ==
Prior to this competition, the existing world and Pan American Games records were as follows:

World record	Barbora Špotáková (CZE)	72.28	Stuttgart, Germany	September 13, 2008
Pan American Games record	Osleidys Menéndez (CUB)	65.85	Winnipeg, Canada	July 25, 1999

== Qualification ==
Each National Olympic Committee (NOC) was able to enter up to two entrants providing they had met the minimum standard (51.07) in the qualifying period (January 1, 2014 to June 28, 2015).

== Schedule ==
Date	Time	Round
July 21, 2015	10:05	Final

== Results ==
All results shown are in meters.

KEY:	q	Best non-qualifiers	Q	Qualified	NR	National record	PB	Personal best	SB	Seasonal best	DQ	Disqualified

=== Final ===
Rank	Name	Nationality	#1	#2	#3	#4	#5	#6	Mark	Notes
1st place, gold medalist(s)	Elizabeth Gleadle	Canada	59.33	58.84	55.63	x	55.91	62.83	62.83	
2nd place, silver medalist(s)	Kara Winger	United States	56.86	54.41	58.89	56.62	59.74	61.44	61.44	
3rd place, bronze medalist(s)	Jucilene de Lima	Brazil	x	58.84	57.93	60.42	56.31	x	60.42	
4	Laila Domingos	Brazil	x	52.25	55.60	52.87	58.19	x	58.19	
5	Flor Ruiz	Colombia	56.28	53.09	58.08	55.71	x	54.55	58.08	
6	Yulenmis Aguilar	Cuba	57.87	57.49	55.60	55.93	57.76	57.14	57.87	
7	Melissa Fraser	Canada	45.27	52.20	x	48.04	x	x	52.20	
8	Hannah Carson	United States	50.90	x	51.93	x	51.16	x	51.93	
	Abigail Gomez	Mexico	x	x	–				NM	
	Dalila Rugama	Nicaragua	x	x	–				NM	
