= Laila Ferrer e Silva =

Brazilian javelin thrower (born 1982)

Personal information
- Full name: Laila Ferrer e Silva Domingos
- Born: July 30, 1982 (age 43) Pacatuba, Ceará, Brazil
- Height: 1.80 m (5 ft 11 in)
- Weight: 80 kg (180 lb)

Sport
- Country: Brazil
- Sport: Athletics
- Event: Javelin throw
- Updated on 11 May 2014

Laila Ferrer e Silva Domingos (born 30 July 1982 in Pacatuba, Ceará) is a Brazilian javelin thrower. She competed in the javelin throw event at the 2012 Summer Olympics. She competed at the 2020 Summer Olympics.

In December 2012, she married hammer thrower Wagner Domingos.

== Personal bests ==
- Javelin throw: 62.52 m – (Brazil) São Bernardo do Campo, 11 June 2017

== Competition record ==
Year	Competition	Venue	Position	Notes
Representing Brazil
2011	South American Championships	Buenos Aires, Argentina	4th	53.67 m
2011	Pan American Games	Guadalajara, Mexico	15th	46.43 m
2012	Ibero-American Championships	Barquisimeto, Venezuela	3rd	57.14 m
2012	Olympic Games	London, United Kingdom	21st (q)	58.39 m
2013	South American Championships	Cartagena, Colombia	2nd	58.80 m
2014	South American Games	Santiago, Chile	3rd	57.11 m
2014	Ibero-American Championships	São Paulo, Brazil	2nd	58.12 m
2015	Pan American Games	Toronto, Canada	4th	58.19 m
2016	Ibero-American Championships	Rio de Janeiro, Brazil	2nd	60.44 m
2017	South American Championships	Asunción, Paraguay	2nd	58.50 m
2017	World Championships	London, United Kingdom	18th (q)	60.54 m
2018	South American Games	Cochabamba, Bolivia	1st	60.25 m
2018	Ibero-American Championships	Trujillo, Peru	3rd	58.24 m
2019	South American Championships	Lima, Peru	1st	57.79 m
2019	Pan American Games	Lima, Peru	5th	59.15 m
2019	World Championships	Doha, Qatar	28th (q)	55.49 m
2021	South American Championships	Guayaquil, Ecuador	1st	59.97 m
2021	Olympic Games	Tokyo, Japan	18th (q)	59.47 m
2023	South American Championships	São Paulo, Brazil	6th	53.87 m
2024	Ibero-American Championships	Cuiabá, Brazil	7th	52.24 m
