= Kara Winger =

American javelin thrower (b. 1986)

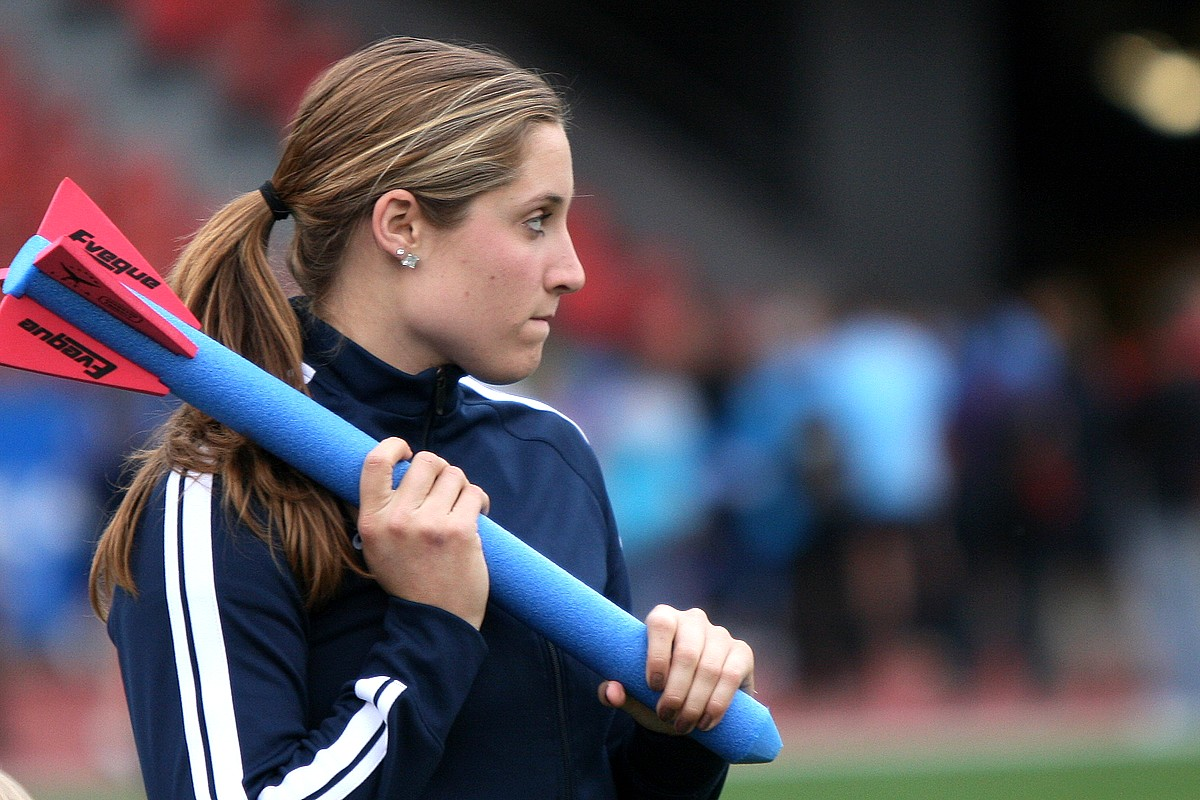
- Kara Winger in 2010

Personal information
- Born: Kara Estelle Patterson; April 10, 1986 (age 40) Seattle, Washington, U.S.
- Height: 6 ft 1.75 in (187 cm)
- Weight: 185 lb (84 kg)
- Website: karathrowsjavelin.blogspot.com

Sport
- Sport: Athletics
- Event: Javelin throw

Achievements and titles
- Highest world ranking: 1st (2023)
- Personal best: NR 68.11 m (2022)
Medal record
Women's athletics
Representing the United States
World Championships
Silver medal – second place	2022 Eugene	Javelin throw
Diamond League
First place	2022	Javelin throw
Pan American Games
Gold medal – first place	2019 Lima	Javelin throw
Silver medal – second place	2015 Toronto	Javelin throw
NACAC Championships
Gold medal – first place	2022 Freeport	Javelin throw
Representing Americas
Continental Cup
Bronze medal – third place	2018 Ostrava	Javelin throw

Kara Estelle Winger (née Patterson; born April 10, 1986) is an American track and field athlete who competes in the javelin throw. She is the American record holder in the javelin throw with a distance of 68.11 m (223 ft 5 1/4 in).

== Career ==
At the 2004 United States Olympic Trials (track and field), Patterson finished 19th with a distance of 42.60 m (139 ft 9 in).

In 2005, she won a silver medal at the 2005 Pan Am Junior Games with a distance of 50.26 m (164 ft 10 1/2 in).

Kara Patterson met her husband Russell Winger when he won the silver medal at the 2006 NACAC U23 Championships in Athletics Shot Put and she placed 7th in the javelin. Winger told this story after placing 2nd the 2019 USATF Outdoor Track and Field Championship in Javelin to champion Ariana Ince.

At the 2008 Olympic Trials, Winger won with a distance of 53.93 m. At the 2008 Summer Olympics, Winger didn't make it past the qualifying round and finished 41st overall with a distance of 54.39 m.

At the 2009 World Trials, Winger won with a distance of 63.95 m. At the 2009 World Championships in Athletics, Patterson didn't make it past the qualifying round and finished 29th overall with a distance of 52.71 m.

At the 2010 US Track and Field Championships, Winger won with a distance of 63.95 m. On June 25, 2010, Patterson broke Kim Kreiner's American record of 64.19 m set in 2007 with a distance of 66.67 m.

At the 2011 World Trials, Winger won with a distance of 59.34 m. At the 2011 World Championships in Athletics – Women's javelin throw, Winger threw 57.14 meters 21st place in the prelims.

At the 2012 Olympic Trials, Winger earned second place with a distance of 59.79 m. At the 2012 Summer Olympics, she finished 31st in the qualifying round, not reaching the final.

At the 2013 World Trials, Winger earned third place with a distance of 55.88 m.

At the 2014 US Track and Field Championships, Winger won with a distance of 62.43 m.

At the 2015 World Trials, Winger won with a distance of 64.94 m. At the 2015 World Championships in Athletics – Women's javelin throw, Winger threw 62.21 m in the prelims to qualify for the final and 60.88 meters in the final to place 8th.

Winger placed 17th with a throw of 59.71 m (195 ft 10 3/4 in) at Athletics at the 2020 Summer Olympics – Women's javelin throw.

At the 2020 Summer Olympics, Winger carried the flag of the United States of America at the closing ceremonies.

At the 2022 World Athletics Championships, Winger won a silver medal, which made her the first American woman to win a medal in javelin at any World Athletics Championships.

At the 2022 NACAC Championships, Winger won and threw 64.68 m (212 ft 2 1/4 in) which set a NACAC Championship record. At the 2022 Diamond League final in Brussels, Winger threw an area record (AR North American record), and NR US record 68.11 m (223 ft 5 1/4 in) in Javelin.

== World championships ==
Winger (still Kara Patterson at the time) earned her first invitation to the world championships in 2009, while still at Purdue. At the US Championships, she fouled on her initial attempt, then threw only 48.88 m on a second attempt. Her third throw went 52.02 m qualifying her as seventh out of eight to make the finals. She fouled again during the finals, but then beat the rest of the field by more than 4 m (13 ft). Her throw of 63.95 m was a career-best and 0.24 m shy of the national record. She was unable to perform that well in Berlin at the World Championships. Her best throw in Berlin was 52.71 m earning her 28th place.

Winger entered the USA track and field championships held in Eugene, Oregon in 2011. She recorded 194.67 ft (59.34 m) to beat her nearest competitor by 14 ft (4.3 m). This throw guaranteed her entry into the 2011 World Championships in Daegu, South Korea. Her best throw in the world championships was 57.1 point meters, placing her 20th. She did not qualify for the finals.

In 2012, Winger suffered an ACL injury. She returned to competition in 2013, but was unable to qualify for the 2013 World Championships held in Moscow.

In 2015, Winger earned an invitation to the World Championships in Athletics held in Beijing. All 32 qualifiers compete in the initial qualification event, with the top 12 going on to the finals round. Winger's throw of 62.21 m placed her in twelfth, only 0.04 m ahead of the 13th position. In the finals round, her best throw was 60.88 m, finishing in 8th place.

Winger earned an invitation to the 2017 World Championships held in London. In the qualifying round, she threw 61.27 m and finished 15th.

Winger qualified for the 2019 world championships held in Doha, Qatar. In the qualifying round she finished seventh with a throw of 62.13 m. She finished fifth with a throw of 63.23 m, the best ever by an American at the world championships.

In 2022, Winger initially announced she would be retiring after this season making this year's World Championships her last major international event in her career. In the qualifier round, Winger threw 61.3 m for fourth in the standings. On her final throw in the finals, she managed 64.05 m for second place. It was the first ever medal earned by an American in the women's javelin at the World Championships.

== Personal life ==
Winger was born in Seattle, Washington in 1986, the daughter of Bruce and Rona Patterson. She went to Alki Middle School and is a 2004 graduate of Skyview High School in Vancouver, Washington. She attended Purdue University and graduated in 2009, majoring in nutrition, fitness and health. She lives with fellow athlete Russell Winger, whom she married in September 2014.

== National titles ==
- USA Outdoor Track and Field Championships
  - Javelin: 2008, 2009, 2010, 2011, 2014, 2015, 2017, 2018, 2022

== US Championships ==
Year	Place	Mark
2024 Olympic Trials	2nd	62.94 m (206 ft 5 3/4 in)
2022 USA Outdoor Track and Field Championships	1st	64.26 m (210 ft 9 3/4 in)
2021 Olympic Trials	2nd	61.47 m (201 ft 8 in)
2019 USA Outdoor Track and Field Championships	2nd	59.73 m (195 ft 11 1/2 in)
2018 USA Outdoor Track and Field Championships	1st	62.88 m (206 ft 4 in)
2017 USA Outdoor Track and Field Championships	1st	62.80 m (206 ft 0 in)
2016 Olympic Trials	3rd	57.90 m (190 ft 0 in)
2015 USA Outdoor Track and Field Championships	1st	64.94 m (213 ft 1 in)
2014 USA Outdoor Track and Field Championships	1st	62.43 m (204 ft 9 3/4 in)
2013 USA Outdoor Track and Field Championships	3rd	55.88 m (183 ft 4 in)
2012 Olympic Trials	2nd	59.79 m (196 ft 1 3/4 in)
2011 USA Outdoor Track and Field Championships	1st	59.34 m (194 ft 8 in)
2010 USA Outdoor Track and Field Championships	1st	66.67 m (218 ft 8 3/4 in) NR
2009 USA Outdoor Track and Field Championships	1st	63.95 m (209 ft 9 1/2 in)
2008 Olympic Trials	1st	61.51 m (201 ft 9 1/2 in)

== Personal bests ==
Event	Best (m)	Venue	Date
Javelin throw (outdoor)	68.11AR, NR	Brussels, Belgium	September 2, 2022

Key: AR = Area record, NR = National record
