= Athletics at the 2019 Pan American Games – Women's javelin throw =

Women's javelin throw at the 2019 Pan American Games
- Venue: Athletics Stadium
- Dates: August 9
- Competitors: 14 from 10 nations
- Winning distance: 64.92

Medalists
Gold medal	Kara Winger	United States
Silver medal	Elizabeth Gleadle	Canada
Bronze medal	Ariana Ince	United States

The women's javelin throw competition of the athletics events at the 2019 Pan American Games took place on 9 August at the 2019 Pan American Games Athletics Stadium. The defending Pan American Games champion was Elizabeth Gleadle from Canada.

== Records ==
Prior to this competition, the existing world and Pan American Games records were as follows:

World record	Barbora Špotáková (CZE)	72.28	Stuttgart, Germany	September 13, 2008
Pan American Games record	Osleidys Menéndez (CUB)	65.85	Winnipeg, Canada	July 25, 1999

== Schedule ==
Date	Time	Round
August 9, 2019	15:05	Final

== Results ==
All times shown are in meters.

KEY:	q	Fastest non-qualifiers	Q	Qualified	NR	National record	PB	Personal best	SB	Seasonal best	DQ	Disqualified

=== Final ===
The final took place on 9 August at 15:05. The results were as follows:

Rank	Name	Nationality	#1	#2	#3	#4	#5	#6	Time	Notes
1st place, gold medalist(s)	Kara Winger	United States	63.31	64.92	62.78	63.23	61.15	62.50	64.92	SB
2nd place, silver medalist(s)	Elizabeth Gleadle	Canada	59.99	x	57.00	x	63.30	x	63.30	
3rd place, bronze medalist(s)	Ariana Ince	United States	62.32	x	x	58.32	x	61.21	62.32	
4	María Lucelly Murillo	Colombia	52.33	55.57	52.66	57.88	59.69	x	59.69	
5	Laila Domingos	Brazil	59.15	54.11	55.71	56.33	56.90	57.92	59.15	SB
6	Flor Ruiz	Colombia	56.90	46.67	–	–	–	–	56.90	
7	Juleisy Angulo	Ecuador	55.45	x	55.13	56.51	53.76	55.18	56.51	
8	Melissa Hernández Cárdenas	Cuba	x	51.51	56.20	50.99	55.44	51.11	56.20	PB
9	Laura Paredes	Paraguay	54.16	52.21	53.47				54.16	
10	María Ríos	Chile	51.81	49.65	53.66				53.66	
11	Coraly Ortiz	Puerto Rico	x	51.74	x				51.74	
12	Rafaela Torres	Brazil	50.59	x	50.12				50.59	
13	Mailen Brooks	Cuba	49.52	x	43.37				49.52	
14	Dalila Rugama	Nicaragua	46.88	47.66	44.53				47.66	
