= 2017 World Championships in Athletics – Women's javelin throw =

Women's javelin throw at the 2017 World Championships
- Venue: Olympic Stadium
- Dates: 6 August (qualification); 8 August (final)
- Competitors: 31 from 22 nations
- Winning distance: 66.76

Medalists
gold medal	Barbora Špotáková	Czech Republic
silver medal	Li Lingwei	China
bronze medal	Lü Huihui	China

Video on YouTube Official Video

The women's javelin throw at the 2017 World Championships in Athletics was held at the Olympic Stadium on 6 and 8 August.

== Summary ==
Olympic gold medalist Sara Kolak's second throw took the lead at 64.95 metres. Her lead lasted only two throws before world record holder, at age 36, Barbora Špotáková threw 66.76 m (219 ft 0 in), which turned out to be the winner. These were two of six throwers who achieved their best distance in the second round. Li Lingwei's personal best 66.25 metres near the end of the third round put her in second place. After improving her own Asian record by almost a metre and a half to 67.59 m (221 ft 9 in), to move to #11 of all time, in her only throw of the qualifying round, Lü Huihui barely qualified into the final round in seventh place. With the benefit of those three extra throws, Lü threw a 65.26m in the fifth round to take the bronze medal from Kolak. She was the only competitor to improve her position in the final three throws.

== Records ==
Before the competition records were as follows:

Record	Dist.	Athlete	Nat.	Date	Location
World	72.28	Barbora Špotáková	CZE	13 Sep 2008	Stuttgart, Germany
Championship	71.99	Maria Abakumova	RUS	2 Sep 2011	Daegu, South Korea
World leading	68.43	Sara Kolak	CRO	6 Jul 2017	Lausanne, Switzerland
African	69.35	Sunette Viljoen	RSA	9 Jun 2012	New York City, United States
Asian	66.13	Lü Huihui	CHN	30 Aug 2015	Beijing, China
NACAC	71.70	Olisdeilys Menéndez	CUB	14 Aug 2005	Helsinki, Finland
South American	63.84	Flor Ruiz	COL	25 Jun 2016	Cali, Colombia
European	72.28	Barbora Špotáková	CZE	13 Sep 2008	Stuttgart, Germany
Oceanian	66.83	Kimberley Mickle	AUS	22 Mar 2014	Melbourne, Australia

The following records were set at the competition:

Record	Dist.	Athlete	Nat.	Date
Asian	67.59	Lü Huihui	CHN	6 Aug 2017
Chinese	67.59	Lü Huihui	CHN	6 Aug 2017

== Qualification standard ==
The standard to qualify automatically for entry was 61.40 metres.

== Schedule ==
The event schedule, in local time (UTC+1), was as follows:

Date	Time	Round
6 August	19:05	Qualification
8 August	19:20	Final

== Results ==
=== Qualification ===
The qualification round took place on 6 August, in two groups, with Group A starting at 19:05 and Group B starting at 20:29. Athletes attaining a mark of at least 63.50 metres( Q ) or at least the 12 best performers ( q ) qualified for the final. The overall results were as follows:

Rank	Group	Name	Nationality	Round			Mark	Notes
Rank	Group	Name	Nationality	1	2	3	Mark	Notes
1	B	Lü Huihui	China	67.59			67.59	Q, AR
2	B	Martina Ratej	Slovenia	65.64			65.64	Q, SB
3	A	Katharina Molitor	Germany	61.76	65.37		65.37	Q, SB
4	A	Liu Shiying	China	x	58.89	64.72	64.72	Q
5	B	Barbora Špotáková	Czech Republic	59.04	64.32		64.32	Q
6	B	Eda Tuğsuz	Turkey	62.13	61.51	63.87	63.87	Q
7	A	Kelsey-Lee Roberts	Australia	61.12	63.70		63.70	Q
8	A	Sara Kolak	Croatia	63.03	x	63.24	63.24	q
9	B	Ásdís Hjálmsdóttir	Iceland	59.53	57.28	63.06	63.06	q
10	A	Elizabeth Gleadle	Canada	61.39	62.97	x	62.97	q
11	A	Tatsiana Khaladovich	Belarus	62.58	61.07	59.73	62.58	q
12	B	Li Lingwei	China	62.26	62.29	60.78	62.29	q
13	B	Anete Kociņa	Latvia	x	62.26	58.75	62.26	
14	A	Marharyta Dorozhon	Israel	56.02	61.33	x	61.33	
15	A	Kara Winger	United States	61.27	58.24	59.63	61.27	
16	A	Marina Saito	Japan	59.21	57.29	60.86	60.86	
17	B	Christin Hussong	Germany	57.53	56.92	60.86	60.86	
18	B	Laila Domingos	Brazil	60.54	56.44	60.10	60.54	
19	A	Nikola Ogrodníková	Czech Republic	59.99	x	55.89	59.99	
20	B	Annu Rani	India	57.34	59.93	57.16	59.93	
21	A	Madara Palameika	Latvia	x	59.54	x	59.54	
22	B	Marcelina Witek	Poland	59.00	x	x	59.00	
23	A	Flor Ruiz	Colombia	57.93	57.94	x	57.94	
24	A	Yuki Ebihara	Japan	55.36	57.51	x	57.51	
25	B	Kathryn Mitchell	Australia	57.42	x	x	57.42	
26	A	Liveta Jasiūnaitė	Lithuania	50.51	55.05	55.80	55.80	
27	A	Sigrid Borge	Norway	54.94	55.08	x	55.08	
28	B	Ariana Ince	United States	x	54.52	x	54.52	
29	B	Risa Miyashita	Japan	51.57	53.43	53.83	53.83	
30	A	Hanna Hatsko-Fedusova	Ukraine	x	51.90	x	51.90	
	B	Vera Rebrik	Authorised Neutral Athletes	x	x	r	NM	

=== Final ===
The final took place on 8 August at 19:20. The results were as follows:

Rank	Name	Nationality	Round						Mark	Notes
Rank	Name	Nationality	1	2	3	4	5	6	Mark	Notes
1st place, gold medalist(s)	Barbora Špotáková	Czech Republic	58.48	66.76	x	65.64	62.57	63.75	66.76	
2nd place, silver medalist(s)	Li Lingwei	China	61.81	63.01	66.25	65.38	x	x	66.25	PB
3rd place, bronze medalist(s)	Lü Huihui	China	62.71	62.44	61.95	60.87	65.26	58.30	65.26	
4	Sara Kolak	Croatia	x	64.95	x	57.38	63.50	x	64.95	
5	Eda Tuğsuz	Turkey	61.81	64.52	x	63.68	64.47	62.77	64.52	
6	Tatsiana Khaladovich	Belarus	63.04	64.05	x	x	62.62	x	64.05	
7	Katharina Molitor	Germany	59.81	63.75	59.67	59.67	59.80	58.30	63.75	
8	Liu Shiying	China	x	x	62.28	62.84	61.31	61.39	62.84	
9	Martina Ratej	Slovenia	61.05	x	59.11				61.05	
10	Kelsey-Lee Roberts	Australia	60.76	58.39	59.76				60.76	
11	Ásdís Hjálmsdóttir	Iceland	57.38	60.16	x				60.16	
12	Elizabeth Gleadle	Canada	60.12	58.87	58.36				60.12	
