= Iceland at the 2009 World Championships in Athletics =

- WA code: ISL

in Berlin
- Competitors: 2 (1 man, 1 woman)
- Medals: Gold 0 Silver 0 Bronze 0 Total 0

World Championships in Athletics appearances
- 1983; 1987; 1991; 1993; 1995; 1997; 1999; 2001; 2003; 2005; 2007; 2009; 2011; 2013; 2015; 2017; 2019; 2022; 2023; 2025

Iceland competes at the 2009 World Championships in Athletics from 15–23 August in Berlin.

== Team selection ==
Field and combined events

Event	Athletes	
Event	Men	Women
Javelin throw		Ásdís Hjálmsdóttir
Hammer throw	Bergur Ingi Pétursson	

== Results ==
=== Men ===
Field and combined events

Event	Athletes	Qualification		Final	
Event	Athletes	Result	Rank	Result	Rank
Hammer throw	Bergur Ingi Pétursson	68.62	31	did not advance	

=== Women ===
Field and combined events

Event	Athletes	Qualification		Final	
Event	Athletes	Result	Rank	Result	Rank
Javelin throw	Ásdís Hjálmsdóttir	55.86	23	did not advance	
