= 2013 World Championships in Athletics – Women's javelin throw =

Women's javelin throw at the 2013 World Championships
- Venue: Luzhniki Stadium
- Dates: 16 August (qualification); 18 August (final)
- Competitors: 27 from 19 nations
- Winning distance: 69.05 m (226 ft 6 1/2 in)

Medalists
gold medal	Christina Obergföll; Germany
silver medal	Kimberley Mickle; Australia
bronze medal	Mariya Abakumova; Russia

The women's javelin throw at the 2013 World Championships in Athletics was held at the Luzhniki Stadium on 16–18 August.

Throwing at home, defending champion and world leader Mariya Abakumova made one attempt in the trials. Her 69.09 flew past the automatic qualifying mark and turned out to be the farthest throw of the competition, leading ten other automatic qualifiers.

In the final, Abakumova couldn't match her qualifier, though she did take the first round lead with 65.09. But that was to be her best. In the second round Kimberley Mickle threw a personal best 66.25 to take the lead. The lead lasted only 5 attempts before Christina Obergföll let loose a 69.05. That was it, the only other news from the final four rounds was Mickle's second improvement on her personal best to 66.60 in the final round.

== Records ==
Prior to the competition, the records were as follows:

World record	Barbora Špotáková (CZE)	72.28	Stuttgart, Germany	13 September 2008
Championship record	Maria Abakumova (RUS)	71.99	Daegu, South Korea	2 September 2011
World leading	Maria Abakumova (RUS)	69.34	Castellón, Spain	22 July 2013
African record	Sunette Viljoen (RSA)	69.35	New York City, United States	9 Jun 2012
Asian record	Lü Huihui (CHN)	65.62	Zhaoqing, People's Republic of China	27 April 2013
North, Central American and Caribbean record	Olisdeilys Menéndez (CUB)	71.70	Helsinki, Finland	14 August 2005
South American record	Sabina Moya (COL)	62.62	Guatemala City, Guatemala	12 May 2002
European record	Barbora Špotáková (CZE)	72.28	Stuttgart, Germany	13 September 2008
Oceanian record	Louise Currey (AUS)	66.80	Runaway Bay, Australia	5 August 2000

== Qualification standards ==
A result	B result
62.00	60.00

== Schedule ==
Date	Time	Round
16 August 2013	9:30	Qualification
18 August 2013	16:00	Final

All times are local times (UTC+4)

== Results ==
KEY:	Q	Qualified	q	12 best performers	NR	National record	PB	Personal best	SB	Seasonal best

=== Qualification ===
Qualification: Qualifying Performance 61.50 (Q) or at least 12 best performers (q) advanced to the final.

Rank	Group	Name	Nationality	No. 1	No. 2	No. 3	Result	Notes
1	A	Mariya Abakumova	Russia	69.09			69.09	Q
2	B	Kimberley Mickle	Australia	59.92	65.73		65.73	Q, PB
3	A	Linda Stahl	Germany	64.51			64.51	Q
3	B	Sunette Viljoen	South Africa	64.51			64.51	Q, SB
5	A	Kathryn Mitchell	Australia	x	62.80		62.80	Q, SB
6	B	Tatjana Jelača	Serbia	57.65	62.68		62.68	Q, NR
7	B	Christina Obergföll	Germany	62.36			62.36	Q
8	B	Viktoriya Sudarushkina	Russia	x	52.88	62.20	62.20	Q
9	A	Sofi Flinck	Sweden	61.96			61.96	Q, NR
10	A	Vira Rebryk	Ukraine	59.49	58.60	61.70	61.70	Q
11	B	Li Lingwei	China	58.62	61.51		61.51	Q, SB
12	B	Nadeeka Lakmali	Sri Lanka	56.12	59.09	60.39	60.39	q
13	B	Katharina Molitor	Germany	57.17	58.03	60.32	60.32	
14	B	Līna Mūze	Latvia	54.36	60.29	x	60.29	
15	A	Zhang Li	China	58.59	60.16	58.98	60.16	
16	A	Yuki Ebihara	Japan	58.39	59.31	59.80	59.80	
17	A	Krista Woodward	Canada	58.86	55.31	55.59	58.86	
18	A	Hanna Hatsko	Ukraine	57.82	58.63	57.55	58.63	
19	B	Marharyta Dorozhon	Ukraine	58.23	54.53	55.40	58.23	
20	B	Martina Ratej	Slovenia	56.36	57.95	x	57.95	
21	B	Ásdís Hjálmsdóttir	Iceland	57.36	57.65	55.98	57.65	
22	B	Brittany Borman	United States	53.20	57.63	x	57.63	
23	A	Flor Ruiz	Colombia	55.43	57.47	54.09	57.47	
24	B	Liina Laasma	Estonia	55.53	54.11	56.93	56.93	
25	A	Eliza Toader	Romania	54.47	55.76	54.64	55.76	
26	A	Jucilene de Lima	Brazil	54.14	55.18	x	55.18	
27	A	Madara Palameika	Latvia	x	x	53.70	53.70	

=== Final ===
The final was started at 16:00.

Rank	Name	Nationality	No. 1	No. 2	No. 3	No. 4	No. 5	No. 6	Result	Notes
1st place, gold medalist(s)	Christina Obergföll	Germany	64.63	69.05	64.02	62.93	x	x	69.05	SB
2nd place, silver medalist(s)	Kimberley Mickle	Australia	60.43	66.25	64.18	64.29	x	66.60	66.60	PB
3rd place, bronze medalist(s)	Mariya Abakumova	Russia	65.09	63.78	64.33	x	60.99	58.71	65.09	
4	Linda Stahl	Germany	64.78	62.58	x	x	x	61.81	64.78	
5	Kathryn Mitchell	Australia	63.77	x	60.34	62.19	x	62.23	63.77	SB
6	Sunette Viljoen	South Africa	63.58	x	56.51	58.66	59.00	60.25	63.58	
7	Viktoriya Sudarushkina	Russia	60.44	62.21	55.82	x	58.64	x	62.21	
8	Li Lingwei	China	57.48	60.30	61.30	55.63	57.58	57.96	61.30	
9	Tatjana Jelača	Serbia	60.38	60.63	60.81				60.81	
10	Sofi Flinck	Sweden	57.56	59.52	55.56				59.52	
11	Vira Rebryk	Ukraine	x	58.33	x				58.33	
12	Nadeeka Lakmali	Sri Lanka	55.10	58.16	55.77				58.16	
