= Slovenia at the 2007 World Championships in Athletics =

- WA code: SLO

in Osaka
- Competitors: 12
- Medals: Gold 0 Silver 1 Bronze 0 Total 1

World Championships in Athletics appearances
- 1993; 1995; 1997; 1999; 2001; 2003; 2005; 2007; 2009; 2011; 2013; 2015; 2017; 2019; 2022; 2023; 2025

Other related appearances
- Yugoslavia (1983–1991)

Slovenia was represented at the 2007 World Championships in Athletics by 12 athletes.

== Competitors ==
=== Men ===
100 m: Matic Osovnikar 7. place (10.23), Jan Žumer quarterfinals (10.44).
200 m: Matic Osovnikar quarterfinals (20.65).
110 m Hurdles: Damjan Zlatnar first round (13.77).
3,000 m Steeplechase: Boštjan Buč 17. place in qualifications (8:26.42).

High Jump: Rožle Prezelj 19. place in qualifications (2.26).
Pole Vault: Andrej Poljanec 21. place (5.40).
Hammer Throw: Primož Kozmus silver medal (82.29).

=== Women ===
100 m: Merlene Ottey 38. place in qualifications (11.64).
800 m: Brigita Langerholc 5. place (1:58.52).
1500 m: Sonja Roman semifinals (4:08.60).
Marathon: Helena Javornik 30. place
Triple Jump: Marija Šestak 5. place (14.72).
