= Track and field at the 2015 Military World Games – Women's javelin throw =

The women's javelin throw event at the 2015 Military World Games was held on 4 October at the KAFAC Sports Complex.

== Records ==
Prior to this competition, the existing world and CISM record were as follows:

World Record	Barbora Špotáková (CZE)	72.28	Stuttgart, Germany	13 September 2008
CISM World Record	Zhang Li (CHN)	59.96	Hyderabad, India	18 October 2007

== Schedule ==
Date	Time	Round
4 October 2015	15:15	Final

== Medalists ==
Gold	Silver	Bronze
Zhang Li; China	Jucilene de Lima; Brazil	Nadeeka Lakmali; Sri Lanka

== Results ==
=== Final ===
Rank	Athlete	Nationality	#1	#2	#3	#4	#5	#6	Result	Notes
1st place, gold medalist(s)	Zhang Li	China	57.34	57.65	57.43	58.83	62.95	x	62.95	CR
2nd place, silver medalist(s)	Jucilene de Lima	Brazil	53.42	52.01	56.72	54.75	57.99	55.48	57.99	
3rd place, bronze medalist(s)	Nadeeka Lakmali	Sri Lanka	53.14	55.79	55.57	54.85	55.03	51.92	55.79	
4	Sara Gambetta	Germany	50.06	x	45.08	x	44.19	45.25	50.06	
5	Linda Züblin	Switzerland	45.79	47.26	47.64	45.21	46.69	44.08	47.64	
