= Yusbelys Parra =

Venezuelan javelin thrower

Personal information
- Born: 31 July 1986 (age 39) El Vigía, Venezuela

Sport
- Sport: Track and field

Yusbelys Parra (born 31 July 1986) is a Venezuelan women's javelin thrower.

== Competition record ==
Year	Competition	Venue	Position	Event	Notes
Representing Venezuela
2006	South American Championships	Tunja, Colombia	5th	Javelin	49.04 m
2006	South American U23 Championships	Buenos Aires, Argentina	2nd	Javelin	48.88 m
2011	Pan American Games	Guadalajara, Mexico	4th	Javelin	53.49 m
