= Athletics at the 2013 Summer Universiade – Women's javelin throw =

The women's javelin throw event at the 2013 Summer Universiade was held on 9 July.

== Results ==
Rank	Athlete	Nationality	#1	#2	#3	#4	#5	#6	Result	Notes
1st place, gold medalist(s)	Mariya Abakumova	Russia	62.65	65.12	59.24	x	x	x	65.12	
2nd place, silver medalist(s)	Viktoriya Sudarushkina	Russia	61.94	x	62.68	53.91	57.67	55.07	62.68	
3rd place, bronze medalist(s)	Elisabeth Eberl	Austria	x	52.09	x	55.02	53.74	x	55.02	SB
4	Gundega Grīva	Latvia	52.22	x	53.71	x	50.62	x	53.71	
5	María Paz Ríos	Chile	52.06	49.57	51.16	x	50.14	49.79	52.06	
6	Bernarda Letnar	Slovenia	44.87	48.06	48.15	48.72	46.01	47.06	48.72	SB
7	Elisabeth Höglund	Sweden	43.24	x	46.36	x	x	x	46.36	
8	Ieva Ščiukauskaitė	Lithuania	43.61	43.98	x	x	x	x	43.98	
	Marthe Aaltvedt	Norway	x	x	x				NM	
	Kellyane Ntumba Nzembele	Democratic Republic of the Congo							DNS	
