= 2005 European Athletics U23 Championships – Women's javelin throw =

The women's javelin throw event at the 2005 European Athletics U23 Championships was held in Erfurt, Germany, at Steigerwaldstadion on 16 July.

== Medalists ==
Gold	Annika Suthe; Germany
Silver	Katharina Molitor; Germany
Bronze	Linda Brīvule; Latvia

== Results ==
=== Final ===
16 July

Rank	Name	Nationality	Attempts						Result	Notes
Rank	Name	Nationality	1	2	3	4	5	6	Result	Notes
1st place, gold medalist(s)	Annika Suthe	Germany	53.77	55.66	56.42	55.55	57.72	53.37	57.72	
2nd place, silver medalist(s)	Katharina Molitor	Germany	53.22	52.77	52.68	51.60	57.01	54.73	57.01	
3rd place, bronze medalist(s)	Linda Brīvule	Latvia	51.73	56.12	51.96	x	56.02	x	56.12	
4	Ásdís Hjálmsdóttir	Iceland	50.12	x	53.78	51.45	x	x	53.78	
5	Volha Hamza	Belarus	48.35	50.63	50.47	53.35	52.98	52.37	53.35	
6	Ilze Gribule	Latvia	52.82	x	x	x	49.17	x	52.82	
7	Elodie Masset	France	44.33	49.55	48.57	45.28	46.13	51.59	51.59	
8	Pauliina Laamanen	Finland	51.28	49.22	49.24	x	50.36	x	51.28	
9	Stephanie Hessler	Germany	48.83	48.61	x				48.83	
10	Maryna Novik	Belarus	45.23	x	47.18				47.18	
11	Urszula Piwnicka	Poland	x	41.43	44.87				44.87	

== Participation ==
According to an unofficial count, 11 athletes from 7 countries participated in the event.

- Belarus (2)
- Finland (1)
- France (1)
- Germany (3)
- Iceland (1)
- Latvia (2)
- Poland (1)
