= Iceland at the 2022 World Athletics Championships =

- Flag of Iceland
- WA code: ISL

in Eugene, United States 15 July 2022 – 24 July 2022
- Competitors: 1 (1 man)
- Medals: Gold 0 Silver 0 Bronze 0 Total 0

World Athletics Championships appearances
- 1983; 1987; 1991; 1993; 1995; 1997; 1999; 2001; 2003; 2005; 2007; 2009; 2011; 2013; 2015; 2017; 2019; 2022; 2023; 2025

Iceland competed at the 2022 World Athletics Championships in Eugene, United States, from 15 to 24 July 2022.

== Results ==
Iceland entered 1 athlete.

Key

- Q = Qualified for the next round
- q = Qualified for the next round as a fastest loser or, in field events, by position without achieving the qualifying target
- NR = National record
- PB = Personal best
- SB = Season best
- N/A = Round not applicable for the event

=== Men ===
Field events

Athlete	Event	Qualification		Final	
Athlete	Event	Distance	Position	Distance	Position
Hilmar Örn Jónsson	Hammer throw	72.72	24	Did not advance	
