= Athletics at the 2007 Summer Universiade – Women's javelin throw =

The women's javelin throw event at the 2007 Summer Universiade was held on 12–14 August.

== Medalists ==
Gold	Silver	Bronze
Buoban Pamang; Thailand	Monica Stoian; Romania	Urszula Jasińska; Poland

== Results ==
=== Qualification ===
Qualification: 59.00 m (Q) or at least 12 best (q) qualified for the final.

Rank	Group	Athlete	Nationality	#1	#2	#3	Result	Notes
1	A	Buoban Pamang	Thailand	57.23	58.35	–	58.35	q
2	B	Urszula Jasińska	Poland	55.80	57.98	–	57.98	q
3	B	Mareike Rittweg	Germany	55.46	57.69	55.63	57.69	q
4	A	Katharina Molitor	Germany	53.34	56.53	56.71	56.71	q
5	B	Sunette Viljoen	South Africa	48.65	54.15	55.64	55.64	q
6	A	Yuki Ebihara	Japan	55.33	55.30	51.60	55.33	q, SB
8	A	Monica Stoian	Romania	53.86	x	54.70	54.70	q
7	B	Natallia Shymchuk	Belarus	x	50.39	54.66	54.66	q
9	B	Leryn Franco	Paraguay	47.53	54.52	52.50	54.52	q
10	A	Nikolett Szabó	Hungary	51.70	47.88	54.14	54.14	q
11	B	Pauliina Laamanen	Finland	48.79	48.80	52.17	52.17	q
12	A	Kim Gyeong-ae	South Korea	51.72	49.55	46.12	51.72	q
13	B	Krista Woodward	Canada	49.99	x	51.30	51.30	
14	A	Wu Jie	China	50.19	50.53	50.37	50.53	
15	A	Alexandra Tsisiou	Cyprus	50.44	x	x	50.44	
16	A	na Gutiérrez	Mexico	46.27	49.72	48.99	49.72	
17	A	Annet Kabasindi	Uganda	–	44.94	49.08	49.08	
18	B	Lucy Okumu Aber	Uganda	31.35	45.84	41.06	45.84	
19	B	Aranya Butseesing	Thailand	40.10	44.09	41.92	44.09	
20	B	Geng Aihua	China	38.33	–	–	38.33	

=== Final ===
Rank	Athlete	Nationality	#1	#2	#3	#4	#5	$6	Result	Notes
1st place, gold medalist(s)	Buoban Pamang	Thailand	50.21	59.71	61.40	x	57.85	–	61.40	NR
2nd place, silver medalist(s)	Monica Stoian	Romania	x	59.04	61.19	56.24	55.60	58.42	61.19	PB
3rd place, bronze medalist(s)	Urszula Jasińska	Poland	52.20	60.63	–	56.76	58.19	59.69	60.63	
4	Natallia Shymchuk	Belarus	x	x	58.69	57.43	58.67	55.82	58.69	
5	Sunette Viljoen	South Africa	56.95	58.39	57.80	56.59	x	55.65	58.39	SB
6	Katharina Molitor	Germany	57.00	55.44	58.19	55.98	x	56.74	58.19	
7	Mareike Rittweg	Germany	56.20	55.51	x	x	54.48	55.24	56.20	
8	Yuki Ebihara	Japan	53.47	53.86	55.29	55.31	54.30	55.06	55.31	
9	Kim Gyeong-ae	South Korea	52.79	48.74	50.19				52.79	
10	Leryn Franco	Paraguay	50.34	52.24	48.88				52.24	
11	Nikolett Szabó	Hungary	x	51.62	x				51.62	
12	Pauliina Laamanen	Finland	x	48.06	51.40				51.40	
