= Krista Woodward =

Canadian javelin thrower

Krista Woodward (born 22 November 1984) is a Canadian track and field athlete specialising in the javelin throw. She won the gold medal at the 2013 Jeux de la Francophonie. She also competed at the 2013 World Championships failing to advance to the final.

Woodward competed for the Georgia Bulldogs track and field team in the NCAA.

Her personal best in the event is 60.15 metres set in Tokyo in 2013.

== Competition record ==
Year	Competition	Venue	Position	Notes
Representing Canada
2001	Jeux de la Francophonie	Ottawa, Ontario, Canada	8th	48.10 m
2002	World Junior Championships	Kingston, Jamaica	12th	46.32 m
2003	Pan American Junior Championships	Bridgetown, Barbados	2nd	48.90 m
2006	NACAC U23 Championships	Santo Domingo, Dominican Republic	2nd	50.63 m
2007	Universiade	Bangkok, Thailand	13th (q)	51.30 m
2013	World Championships	Moscow, Russia	17th (q)	58.86 m
2013	Jeux de la Francophonie	Nice, France	1st	52.82 m
