= Urszula Piwnicka =

Polish javelin thrower

Urszula Piwnicka, née Jasińska (born 6 December 1983 in Pasłęk) is a javelin thrower from Poland. Her personal best throw is 62.34 metres, achieved in May 2007 in Sopot.

== Achievements ==
Year	Competition	Venue	Position	Notes
Representing Poland
2002	World Junior Championships	Kingston, Jamaica	3rd	54.06 m
2005	European U23 Championships	Erfurt, Germany	11th	44.87 m
2007	Universiade	Bangkok, Thailand	3rd	60.63 m
2007	World Championships	Osaka, Japan	24th (q)	56.20 m
2008	Olympic Games	Beijing, PR China	14th (q)	59.28 m
2009	World Championships	Berlin, Germany	20th (q)	56.49 m
