= Elizabeth Gleadle =

Canadian track and field athlete

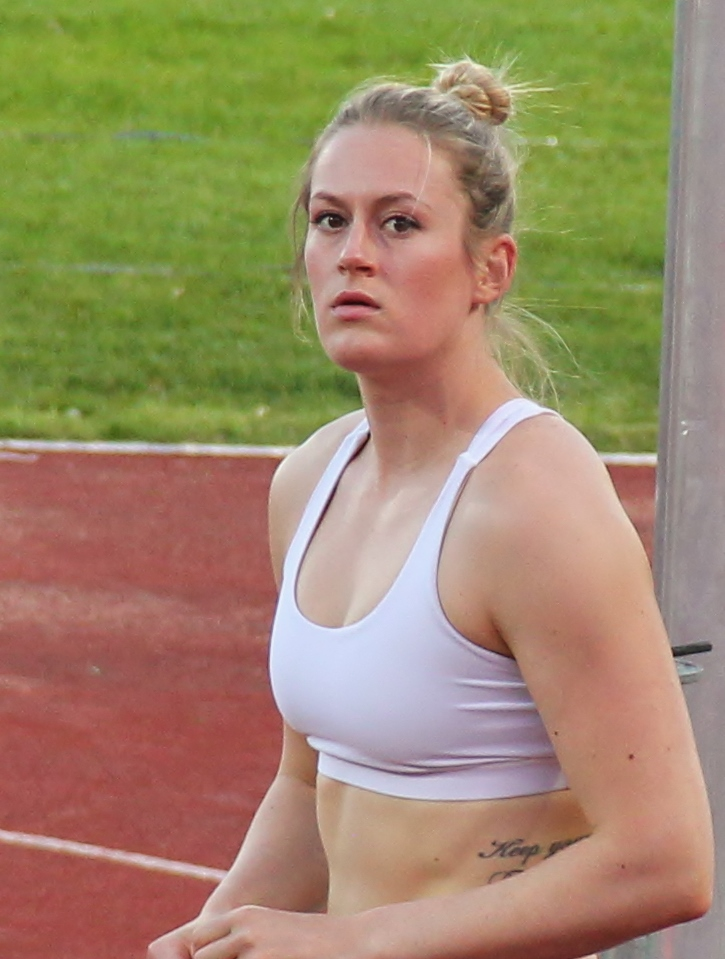
- Gleadle at the 2015 Bislett Games

Personal information
- Born: December 5, 1988 (age 37) Vancouver, British Columbia, Canada
- Height: 1.85 m (6 ft 1 in)
- Weight: 78 kg (172 lb)

Sport
- Country: Canada
- Sport: Athletics
- Event: Javelin

Achievements and titles
- Personal bests: 64.83m NR, Kawasaki, 2015
Medal record
Women's athletics
Representing Canada
Pan American Games
| Gold medal – first place | 2015 Toronto | Javelin throw |
| Silver medal – second place | 2019 Lima | Javelin throw |
Continental Cup
| Bronze medal – third place | 2014 Marrakesh | Javelin throw |

Elizabeth "Liz" Gleadle (born December 5, 1988) is a Canadian former javelin thrower. She retired June 2024. She is the national record holder and has twice won Pan American Games medals, thrice made the World Championship finals (with a best result of 9th) and is a three-time Olympian, making the final at the 2012 Summer Olympics, finishing 12th.

== Life and career ==
Elizabeth Gleadle was born in Vancouver, on December 5, 1988, to parents Dan and Sonia. Her parents enrolled her in almost every sport available throughout elementary school, including playing fastball for the Vancouver Wildcats Rep fastball team as a pitcher. In 2002, while in grade 8 at Kitsilano Secondary School, Geladle threw javelin in Caroline Wittrin's gym class. That year she won the Vancouver City's with a throw of 17 metres. In 2004, while in grade 10, Gleadle placed third at BC High School Championships and won both the BC Youth Championships and the Canadian Youth Championships. In the fall of 2004, Gleadle decided to concentrate on track and field, and joined the Vancouver Thunderbirds Track and Field Club. After winter training, she decided to focus solely on javelin. In the summer of 2005 she was the BC and Canadian Youth Champion, and made the World Youth Team to compete in Morocco, where she threw 50.51m, breaking the Canadian Youth Record and finishing fifth.

In 2005 despite offers of full scholarships from many NCAA Division I schools Gleadle stayed in Vancouver and competed for the University of British Columbia. Over the course of her university career, she won the NAIA Championships each of the four times she entered and broke the NAIA record twice.

In the spring of 2011, Gleadle took a break from her kinesiology degree at UBC to devote herself full-time to training. She moved to the National Training Centre for throws in Lethbridge, Alberta with coach Lawrence Steinke. After the London Olympics, she resumed her studies while also training in Lethbridge. Gleadle missed the entire 2013 competitive season due to a back injury. In 2014 she placed fifth at the 2014 Glasgow Commonwealth Games, throwing 60.69 meters. She also placed third at the 2014 IAAF Continental Cup in Marrakesh, Morocco.

Gleadle broke her own Canadian record in May, 2015 with 64.83 meters when she won the Golden Grand Prix meet in Kawasaki, Japan. On July 4, 2015, she won the 2015 Canadian Track and Field Championships throwing 59 meters in less-than-ideal conditions. She also finished 11th at that year's World Championships.

During the 2016 Harry Jerome Classic in Vancouver, one of Gleadle's throws went out of bounds and narrowly missed a cameraman, piercing his shirt. The cameraman finished shooting the event and she apologized immediately afterwards. She said, "I’m not going to throw a javelin at someone and not see if they’re OK. I don’t feel like that’s polite."

At the 2016 Summer Olympics Gleadle finished 16th in qualifying and did not advance to the final. In 2017, she again reached the World Championship final.

In 2020 Gleadle competed at the 2020 Summer Olympics, finishing 23rd in qualifying and missing the final.

== International competitions ==
| Year | Competition | Venue | Position | Notes |
|---|---|---|---|---|
| 2005 | World Youth Championships | Marrakesh, Morocco | 5th | 50.53 m |
| 2006 | World Junior Championships | Beijing, China | 12th | 48.08 m |
| 2008 | NACAC U-23 Championships | Toluca, Mexico | 1st | 51.76 m A |
| 2009 | Universiade | Belgrade, Serbia | 6th | 58.21 m |
| 2010 | NACAC U23 Championships | Miramar, United States | 1st | 53.72 m |
| 2012 | Olympic Games | London, United Kingdom | 12th | 58.78 m |
| 2014 | Commonwealth Games | Glasgow, United Kingdom | 5th | 60.69 m |
| 2014 | Continental Cup | Marrakesh, Morocco | 3rd | 61.38 m^{1} |
| 2015 | Pan American Games | Toronto, Canada | 1st | 62.83 m |
| 2015 | World Championships | Beijing, China | 11th | 59.82 m |
| 2016 | Olympic Games | Rio de Janeiro, Brazil | 16th (q) | 60.28 m |
| 2017 | World Championships | London, United Kingdom | 12th | 60.12 m |
| 2018 | Commonwealth Games | Gold Coast, Australia | 4th | 59.85 m |
| 2019 | Pan American Games | Lima, Peru | 2nd | 63.30 m |
| 2019 | World Championships | Doha, Qatar | 16th (q) | 60.17 m |
| 2021 | Olympic Games | Tokyo, Japan | 23rd (q) | 58.19 m |
| 2022 | World Championships | Eugene, United States | 9th | 59.59 m |
| 2022 | NACAC Championships | Freeport, Bahamas | 5th | 55.56 m |

^{1}Representing the Americas
