= Slovenia at the 2003 World Championships in Athletics =

Slovenia at the 2003 World Athletics Championships
- WA code: SLO
- National federation: Athletics Federation of Slovenia
- Website: www.atletska-zveza.si (in Slovenian)

in Paris
- Competitors: 13 (6 men and 7 women) in 12 events
- Medals: Gold 0 Silver 0 Bronze 0 Total 0

World Athletics Championships appearances
- 1993; 1995; 1997; 1999; 2001; 2003; 2005; 2007; 2009; 2011; 2013; 2015; 2017; 2019; 2022; 2023

Other related appearances
- Yugoslavia (1983–1991)

Slovenia competed at the 2003 World Championships in Athletics which were held from 23 to 31 August 2003 in the Stade de France in Saint-Denis, France. The country was represented by 13 athletes, six men and seven women.

== Results ==
Key

- Q = Qualified for the next round
- q = Qualified for the next round as a fastest loser or, in field events, by position without achieving the qualifying target
- NR = National record
- PB = Personal best
- SB = Season's best
- N/A = Round not applicable for the event

=== Men ===
Track and road events

Athlete	Event	Heats		Quarterfinals		Semifinal		Final
Athlete	Event	Result	Rank	Result	Rank	Result	Rank	Rank
Matic Osovnikar	100m	10.31	3	10.35	7	Did not advance		
Roman Kejžar	Marathon	N/A					2:24:20	59
Boštjan Buč	3000m steeplechase	N/A		8:22.89	5	Did not advance		

Field events

Athlete	Event	Qualification		Final	
Athlete	Event	Distance	Position	Distance	Position
Rožle Prezelj	High Jump	2.20	15 Group A	Did not advance	
Miran Vodovnik	Shot put	19.23	10 Group B	Did not advance	
Primož Kozmus	Hammer Throw	78.10	4 Group A Q	79.68	5

=== Women ===
Track and road events

Athlete	Event	Heat		Quarterfinals		Semifinal		Final	
Athlete	Event	Result	Rank	Result	Rank	Result	Rank	Rank	
Merlene Ottey	100m	11.26	1 Q	11.31	2 Q	11.26	4	Did not advance	
Merlene Ottey	200m	23.24	5 q	23.22	5	Did not advance			
Jolanda Čeplak	800m	N/A		Did Not Start	-	Did not advance			
Brigita Langerholc	800m	N/A		2:01.55	7 q	2:01.58	6	Did not advance	
Jolanda Čeplak	1500m	N/A		4:11.26	5 Q	4:05.84	4 Q	4:14.18	12
Helena Javornik	10,000m	N/A					32:01.57	18	
• Alenka Bikar • Kristina Žumer • Maja Nose • Merlene Ottey	4 × 100 m relay	DQ	-	N/A				Did not advance	
