= 2002 World Junior Championships in Athletics – Women's javelin throw =

The women's javelin throw event at the 2002 World Junior Championships in Athletics was held in Kingston, Jamaica, at National Stadium on 16 and 17 July.

== Medalists ==
Gold	Linda Brivule; Latvia
Silver	Ilze Gribule; Latvia
Bronze	Urszula Jasińska; Poland

== Results ==
=== Final ===
17 July

Rank	Name	Nationality	Attempts						Result	Notes
Rank	Name	Nationality	1	2	3	4	5	6	Result	Notes
1st place, gold medalist(s)	Linda Brivule	Latvia	51.65	x	53.65	55.35	50.44	51.54	55.35	
2nd place, silver medalist(s)	Ilze Gribule	Latvia	54.16	50.65	x	50.67	48.70	x	54.16	
3rd place, bronze medalist(s)	Urszula Jasińska	Poland	54.06	x	49.08	49.38	49.65	49.46	54.06	
4	Yuneisy Rodríguez	Cuba	51.28	53.23	x	51.50	x	48.56	53.23	
5	Stefanie Hessler	Germany	51.74	50.98	49.37	52.60	51.99	52.49	52.60	
6	Elfje Willemsen	Belgium	x	52.18	48.24	x	x	x	52.18	
7	Lyndsey Johnson	United States	49.96	49.52	50.76	50.99	x	49.36	50.99	
8	Andrea Kvetová	Czech Republic	50.76	49.23	x	49.29	46.73	x	50.76	
9	Kim Mickle	Australia	50.01	48.60	46.87				50.01	
10	Marta Alonso	Spain	x	43.65	47.28				47.28	
11	Olga Gamza	Belarus	41.70	46.69	45.29				46.69	
12	Krista Woodward	Canada	x	46.32	x				46.32	

=== Qualifications ===
16 Jul

==== Group A ====
Rank	Name	Nationality	Attempts			Result	Notes
Rank	Name	Nationality	1	2	3	Result	Notes
1	Linda Brivule	Latvia	48.44	44.74	51.22	51.22	q
2	Stefanie Hessler	Germany	49.87	51.09	48.60	51.09	q
3	Lyndsey Johnson	United States	49.09	50.87	x	50.87	q
4	Yuneisy Rodríguez	Cuba	x	50.35	50.76	50.76	q
5	Urszula Jasińska	Poland	48.04	49.49	49.70	49.70	q
6	Elfje Willemsen	Belgium	43.77	x	47.80	47.80	q
7	Hana'a Omar	Egypt	46.19	31.69	45.63	46.19	
8	Alana Redfern	Canada	42.27	42.69	45.52	45.52	
9	Sigrún Sveinsdóttir	Iceland	39.74	42.57	45.34	45.34	
10	Berna Demirci	Turkey	x	44.78	38.30	44.78	
11	Kimet Sánchez	Dominican Republic	41.75	44.66	43.18	44.66	
12	Dalila Rugama	Nicaragua	38.69	41.97	x	41.97	

==== Group B ====
Rank	Name	Nationality	Attempts			Result	Notes
Rank	Name	Nationality	1	2	3	Result	Notes
1	Andrea Kvetová	Czech Republic	54.65	-	-	54.65	Q
2	Olga Gamza	Belarus	51.11	x	49.16	51.11	q
3	Ilze Gribule	Latvia	49.75	49.55	x	49.75	q
4	Kim Mickle	Australia	48.26	49.67	x	49.67	q
5	Marta Alonso	Spain	47.86	48.41	47.57	48.41	q
6	Krista Woodward	Canada	45.78	47.10	46.30	47.10	q
7	Izabel Savic	Sweden	45.10	46.74	45.59	46.74	
8	Daniela Janke	Germany	46.70	x	44.70	46.70	
9	Shaneka Parkes	Jamaica	39.58	39.06	43.38	43.38	
10	Ana Gutiérrez	Mexico	42.88	42.43	41.03	42.88	
11	Petra Novák	Slovenia	41.51	x	41.00	41.51	
12	Rachel Walker	United States	x	x	38.86	38.86	

== Participation ==
According to an unofficial count, 24 athletes from 20 countries participated in the event.

- Australia (1)
- Belarus (1)
- Belgium (1)
- Canada (2)
- Cuba (1)
- Czech Republic (1)
- Dominican Republic (1)
- Egypt (1)
- Germany (2)
- Iceland (1)
- Jamaica (1)
- Latvia (2)
- Mexico (1)
- Nicaragua (1)
- Poland (1)
- Slovenia (1)
- Spain (1)
- Sweden (1)
- Turkey (1)
- United States (2)
