= Jucilene de Lima =

Brazilian javelin thrower (born 1990)

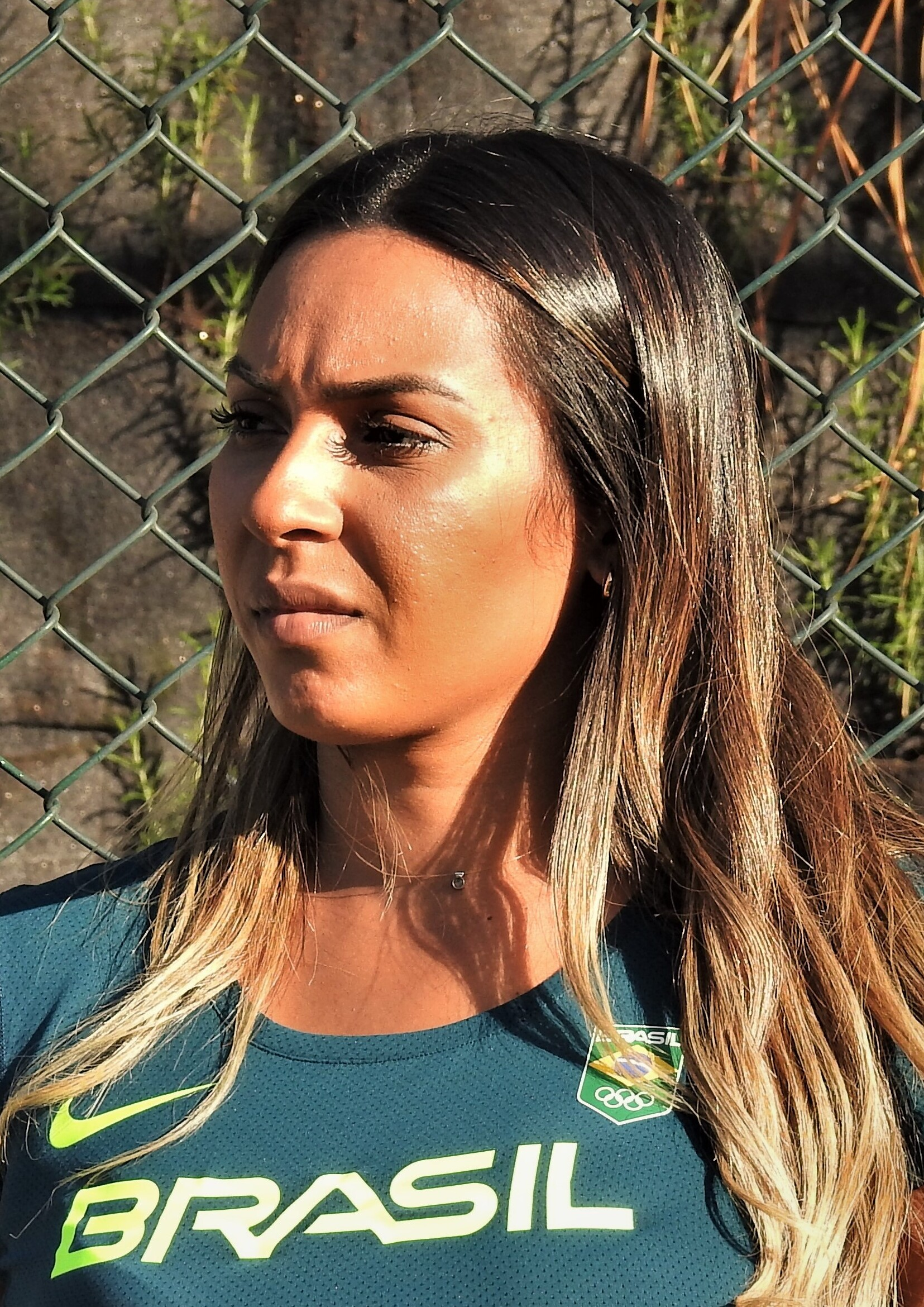
- Jucilene de Lima in 2019

Personal information
- Full name: Jucilene Sales de Lima
- Born: 14 September 1990 (age 36) Taperoá, Paraíba, Brazil

Sport
- Country: Brazil
- Sport: Athletics
- Event: Javelin
Medal record
Women's athletics
Representing Brazil
Pan American Games
Bronze medal – third place	2015 Toronto	Javelin throw
Military World Games
Silver medal – second place	2015 Mungyeong	Javelin throw
- Updated on 10 October 2015

Jucilene Sales de Lima (born 14 September 1990) is a Brazilian athlete specialising in the javelin throw. She represented her country at the 2013 World Championships without qualifying for the final. In addition, she has won multiple medals on regional level, including the bronze at the 2015 Pan American Games. She competed at the 2020 Summer Olympics.

Participating in the 2023 World Athletics Championships, held in Budapest, she became the first Brazilian in history to reach the final of the javelin throw event. In the final (where 12 competitors participated), after performing 3 launches, she was in 6th place, with a mark of 60.34 meters, ranking among the 8 that would continue competing and would make 3 more launches. She didn't improve her mark in the 3 final launches, finishing in 8th place, the best position in the history of Brazil in this event in World Championships.

Her personal best in the event is 62.89 metres set in São Paulo in 2014. This is the Brazilian national record.

== Competition record ==
Year	Competition	Venue	Position	Notes
Representing Brazil
2004	South American Youth Championships	Guayaquil, Ecuador	1st	48.04 m
2005	World Youth Championships	Marrakesh, Morocco	17th (q)	43.62 m
2005	South American Championships	Cali, Colombia	6th	44.74 m
2005	South American Junior Championships	Rosario, Argentina	1st	46.04 m
2006	World Junior Championships	Beijing, China	–	NM
2007	South American Championships	São Paulo, Brazil	4th	52.86 m
2007	South American Junior Championships	São Paulo, Brazil	1st	47.53 m
2007	Pan American Junior Championships	São Paulo, Brazil	1st	49.42 m m
2007	World Youth Championships	Ostrava, Czech Republic	10th	45.73 m
2007	Pan American Games	Rio de Janeiro, Brazil	10th	46.59 m
2008	World Junior Championships	Bydgoszcz, Poland	11th	50.87 m
2008	South American U23 Championships	Lima, Peru	3rd	48.44 m
2009	South American Championships	Lima, Peru	2nd	54.37 m
2009	South American Junior Championships	São Paulo, Brazil	2nd	48.74 m
2009	Pan American Junior Championships	Port of Spain, Trinidad and Tobago	3rd	47.10 m
2012	Ibero-American Championships	Barquisimeto, Venezuela	4th	55.98 m
2012	South American U23 Championships	São Paulo, Brazil	1st	56.00 m
2013	South American Championships	Cartagena, Colombia	3rd	57.73 m
2013	World Championships	Moscow, Russia	26th (q)	55.18 m
2014	South American Games	Santiago, Chile	2nd	60.17 m
2014	Ibero-American Championships	São Paulo, Brazil	1st	61.71 m
2014	Pan American Sports Festival	Mexico City, Mexico	1st	59.86 m
2015	South American Championships	Lima, Peru	1st	60.16 m
2015	Pan American Games	Toronto, Canada	3rd	60.42 m
2015	World Championships	Beijing, China	25th (q)	59.49 m
2015	Military World Games	Mungyeong, South Korea	2nd	57.99 m
2021	South American Championships	Guayaquil, Ecuador	3rd	59.65 m
2021	Olympic Games	Tokyo, Japan	15th (q)	60.14 m
2022	Ibero-American Championships	La Nucía, Spain	3rd	57.86 m
2022	World Championships	Eugene, United States	19th (q)	57.13 m
2022	South American Games	Asunción, Paraguay	2nd	62.42 m
2023	South American Championships	São Paulo, Brazil	2nd	60.68 m
2023	World Championships	Budapest, Hungary	8th	60.34 m
2023	Pan American Games	Santiago, Chile	5th	59.04 m
2024	Ibero-American Championships	Cuiabá, Brazil	2nd	62.31 m
2024	Olympic Games	Paris, France	28th (q)	57.56 m
2025	South American Championships	Mar del Plata, Argentina	1st	62.32 m
2026	Ibero-American Championships	Lima, Peru	1st	60.93 m
2026	South American Games	Santa Fe, Argentina	2nd	54.71 m
