= Slovenia at the 2011 World Championships in Athletics =

- WA code: SLO
- National federation: Slovenian Athletic Federation
- Website: www.atletska-zveza.si

in Daegu
- Competitors: 9
- Medals: Gold 0 Silver 0 Bronze 1 Total 1

World Championships in Athletics appearances
- 1993; 1995; 1997; 1999; 2001; 2003; 2005; 2007; 2009; 2011; 2013; 2015; 2017; 2019; 2022; 2023; 2025

Other related appearances
- Yugoslavia (1983–1991)

Slovenia competed at the 2011 World Championships in Athletics from August 27 to September 4 in Daegu, South Korea.

== Team selection ==
A team of 10 athletes was announced to represent the country in the event. The team will be led by defending hammer throw champion Primož Kozmus.

The following athletes appeared on the preliminary Entry List, but not on the Official Start List of the specific event, resulting in a total number of 9 competitors:

KEY:	Did not participate	Competed in another event

	Event	Athlete
Men	Marathon	Primož Kobe

== Medalists ==
The following competitor from Slovenia won a medal at the Championships

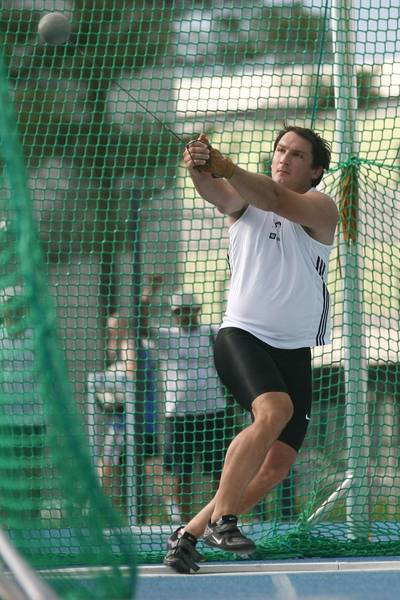
Primož Kozmus won a bronze medal in the Hammer Throw event (foto archived from 2011)

Medal	Athlete	Event
Bronze	Primož Kozmus	Hammer throw

== Results ==
=== Men ===
Athlete	Event	Preliminaries		Heats		Semifinals		Final	
Athlete	Event	Time Width Height	Rank	Time Width Height	Rank	Time Width Height	Rank	Time Width Height	Rank
Anton Kosmač	Marathon							2:24:16	42
Rožle Prezelj	High jump	2.25	21					Did not advance	
Primož Kozmus	Hammer throw	76.54	10 q					79.39 SB	3rd place, bronze medalist(s)
Matija Kranjc	Javelin throw	73.17	31					Did not advance	

=== Women ===
Athlete	Event	Preliminaries		Heats		Semifinals		Final	
Athlete	Event	Time Width Height	Rank	Time Width Height	Rank	Time Width Height	Rank	Time Width Height	Rank
Marina Tomić	100 m hurdles			13.36	27	Did not advance			
Nina Kolarič	Long jump	6.19	27					Did not advance	
Marija Šestak	Triple jump	13.87	21					Did not advance	
Tina Šutej	Pole vault	4.40	21					Did not advance	
Martina Ratej	Javelin throw	61.58	7					61.65	7
