= Athletics at the 2011 Pan American Games – Women's javelin throw =

Women's javelin throw at the 2011 Pan American Games
- Venue: Telmex Athletics Stadium
- Dates: October 27
- Competitors: 15 from 11 nations

Medalists
| Gold medal | Alicia DeShasier | United States |
| Silver medal | Yainelis Ribeaux | Cuba |
| Bronze medal | Yanet Cruz | Cuba |

The women's javelin throw event of the athletics events at the 2011 Pan American Games was held the 27 of October at the Telmex Athletics Stadium. The defending Pan American Games champion is Osleidys Menéndez of the Cuba.

== Records ==
Prior to this competition, the existing world and Pan American Games records were as follows:

| World record | Barbora Špotáková (CZE) | 72.28 | Stuttgart, Germany | September 13, 2008 |
| Pan American Games record | Osleidys Menéndez (CUB) | 65.85 | Winnipeg, Canada | July 25, 1999 |

== Qualification ==
Each National Olympic Committee (NOC) was able to enter up to two entrants providing they had met the minimum standard (50.00) in the qualifying period (January 1, 2010 to September 14, 2011).

== Schedule ==
| Date | Time | Round |
|---|---|---|
| October 27, 2011 | 17:15 | Final |

== Results ==
All distances shown are in meters:centimeters

| KEY: | q | Fastest non-qualifiers | Q | Qualified | NR | National record | PB | Personal best | SB | Seasonal best |

=== Final ===
The final was held on October 27.

| Rank | Athlete | Nationality | #1 | #2 | #3 | #4 | #5 | #6 | Result | Notes |
|---|---|---|---|---|---|---|---|---|---|---|
| 1st place, gold medalist(s) | Alicia DeShasier | United States | 58.01 | x | 53.69 | 53.57 | 53.87 | x | 58.01 | PB |
| 2nd place, silver medalist(s) | Yainelis Ribeaux | Cuba | 55.67 | x | 55.29 | x | 54.01 | 56.21 | 56.21 | |
| 3rd place, bronze medalist(s) | Yanet Cruz | Cuba | 56.19 | x | x | 55.68 | x | 55.56 | 56.19 | |
| 4 | Yusbely Parra | Venezuela | 50.01 | 51.72 | 49.11 | 53.49 | 51.54 | 49.42 | 53.49 | |
| 5 | Coralys Ortiz | Puerto Rico | 52.81 | x | x | x | 49.92 | x | 52.81 | |
| 6 | Fresa Nuñez | Dominican Republic | 48.87 | 51.54 | 50.81 | 51.79 | 51.69 | 51.26 | 51.79 | |
| 7 | Olivia McKoy | Jamaica | 50.55 | 51.07 | 51.40 | x | x | x | 51.40 | |
| 8 | Kateema Riettie | Jamaica | 50.97 | x | 47.91 | x | x | x | 50.97 | |
| 9 | Laverne Eve | Bahamas | x | 50.82 | x | | | | 50.82 | SB |
| 10 | Avione Allgood | United States | 47.32 | x | 50.37 | | | | 50.37 | |
| 11 | Katryna Subeldía | Paraguay | 48.01 | 49.89 | 49.17 | | | | 49.89 | |
| 12 | Abigail Gómez | Mexico | x | 45.19 | 49.15 | | | | 49.15 | |
| 13 | Leryn Franco | Paraguay | 48.70 | x | x | | | | 48.70 | |
| 14 | Dalila Rugama | Nicaragua | 46.82 | x | x | | | | 46.82 | |
| 15 | Laila Ferrer e Silva | Brazil | 46.43 | 46.01 | 45.74 | | | | 46.43 | |
