= Slovenia at the 2023 World Athletics Championships =

- Flag of Slovenia
- WA code: SLO

in Budapest, Hungary 19 August 2023 – 27 August 2023
- Competitors: 13 (2 men and 11 women)
- Medals Ranked 27th: Gold 0 Silver 1 Bronze 0 Total 1

World Athletics Championships appearances
- 1993; 1995; 1997; 1999; 2001; 2003; 2005; 2007; 2009; 2011; 2013; 2015; 2017; 2019; 2022; 2023; 2025

Other related appearances
- Yugoslavia (1983–1991)

Slovenia competed at the 2023 World Athletics Championships in Budapest, Hungary, from 19 to 27 August 2023.

== Medalists ==
Medal	Athlete	Event	Date
Silver	Kristjan Čeh	Discus throw	21 August

== Results ==
Slovenia entered 13 athletes.

Key

- Q = Qualified for the next round
- q = Qualified for the next round as a fastest loser or, in field events, by position without achieving the qualifying target
- NR = National record
- PB = Personal best
- SB = Season best
- N/A = Round not applicable for the event

=== Men ===
Track and road events

Athlete	Event	Heat		Semifinal		Final	
Athlete	Event	Result	Rank	Result	Rank	Result	Rank
Matic Ian Guček	400 metres hurdles	49.40 SB	5	Did not advance			

Field events

Athlete	Event	Qualification		Final	
Athlete	Event	Distance	Position	Distance	Position
Kristjan Čeh	Discus throw	65.95	3 q	70.02	2nd place, silver medalist(s)

=== Women ===
Track and road events

Athlete	Event	Heat		Semifinal		Final	
Athlete	Event	Result	Rank	Result	Rank	Result	Rank
Anita Horvat	800 metres	2:00.06	3 Q	2:00.54	7	Did not advance	
Neja Kršinar	Marathon	—N/a				2:46:55 SB	63
Nika Glojnarič	100 metres hurdles	13.13	8	Did not advance			
Agata Zupin	400 metres hurdles	57.62	8	Did not advance			
Maruša Mišmaš-Zrimšek	3000 metres steeplechase	9:21.79	4 Q	—N/a		9:06.37 NR	6

Field events

Athlete	Event	Qualification		Final	
Athlete	Event	Distance	Position	Distance	Position
Lia Apostolovski	High jump	1.89	=9 q	1.90 =SB	=9
Tina Šutej	Pole vault	4.65	10 Q	4.80 NR	4
Neja Filipič	Triple jump	13.64	25	Did not advance	
Eva Pepelnak	Triple jump	13.60	28	Did not advance	
Martina Ratej	Javelin throw	54.41	29	Did not advance	
