= Katharina Molitor =

German athlete

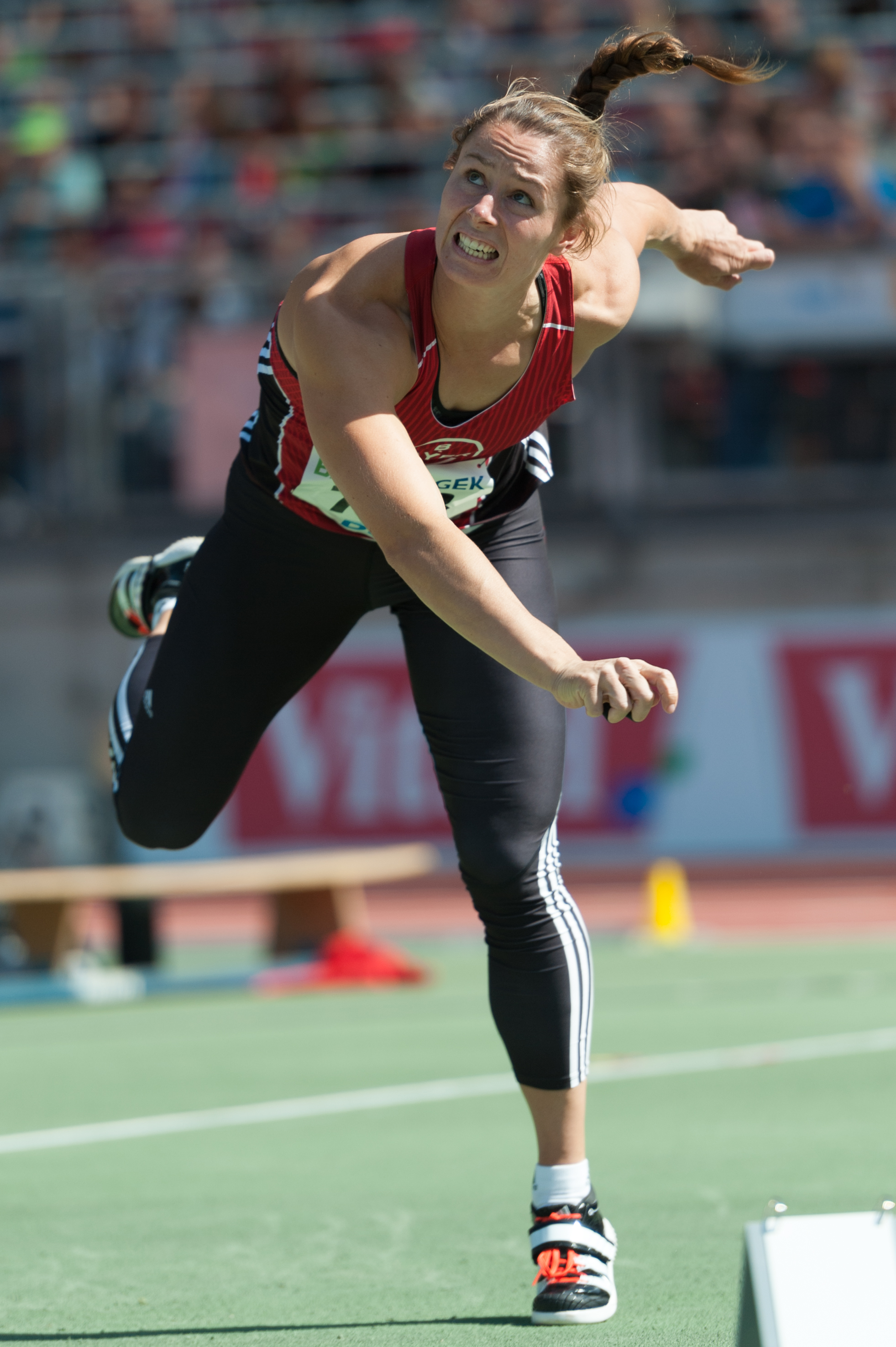
- Molitor in 2015

Personal information
- Born: 8 November 1983 (age 42) Bedburg, West Germany
- Height: 1.83 m (6 ft 0 in)
- Weight: 77 kg (170 lb)
- Website: katharina-molitor.de

Sport
- Country: Germany
- Sport: Track and field
- Event: Javelin throw
- Club: Bayer 04 Leverkusen

Achievements and titles
- Personal best: 67.69 m (2015)
Medal record
World Championships
Gold medal – first place	2015 Beijing	Javelin throw

Katharina Molitor (born 8 November 1983) is a German sportswoman who competes as a javelin thrower and volleyball player. As a javelin thrower, she is a World Champion, having won gold in 2015, and her personal best throw is 67.69 m. As a volleyball player, she represents Bayer Leverkusen in the Erste Volleyball-Bundesliga, the highest tier of German volleyball.

She is a two-time Olympian, having competed in the javelin throw for Germany at the 2008 and 2012 Summer Olympics. She finished eighth in 2008, and improved to sixth in 2012. She won gold at the 2010 German Championships and has since competed in every European and World Championships. Her best result is first place at the 2015 World Championships.

== Competition record ==
Year	Competition	Venue	Position	Notes
Representing Germany
2005	European U23 Championships	Erfurt, Germany	2nd	57.01 m
2007	Universiade	Bangkok, Thailand	6th	58.19 m
2008	Olympic Games	Beijing, China	8th	59.64 m
2009	Universiade	Belgrade, Serbia	4th	59.41 m
2010	European Championships	Barcelona, Spain	4th	63.81 m
2011	World Championships	Daegu, South Korea	5th	64.32 m
2012	European Championships	Helsinki, Finland	5th	60.99 m
2012	Olympic Games	London, United Kingdom	6th	62.89 m
2013	World Championships	Moscow, Russia	13th (q)	60.32 m
2014	European Championships	Zürich, Switzerland	9th	58.00 m
2015	World Championships	Beijing, China	1st	67.69 m
2016	European Championships	Amsterdam, Netherlands	4th	63.20 m
2017	World Championships	London, United Kingdom	7th	63.75 m
2018	European Championships	Berlin, Germany	15th (q)	58.00 m
