= Ilze Gribule =

Latvian javelin thrower

Ilze Gribule (born 25 January 1984 in Krāslava) is a former female javelin thrower from Latvia. Her personal best throw is 58.74 metres, achieved in May 2005 in Riga.

== Achievements ==
Year	Competition	Venue	Position	Notes
Representing Latvia
2000	World Junior Championships	Santiago, Chile	10th	46.47 m
2001	World Youth Championships	Debrecen, Hungary	11th	42.62 m
2002	World Junior Championships	Kingston, Jamaica	2nd	54.16 m
2003	European Junior Championships	Tampere, Finland	3rd	52.76 m
2004	Olympic Games	Athens, Greece	34th	54.92 m
2005	European U23 Championships	Erfurt, Germany	6th	52.82 m
2006	European Championships	Gothenburg, Sweden	22nd	54.48 m
