= 2015 World Championships in Athletics – Women's javelin throw =

Women's javelin throw at the 2015 World Championships
- Venue: Beijing National Stadium
- Dates: 28 August (qualification); 30 August (final)
- Competitors: 32 from 21 nations
- Winning distance: 67.69

Medalists
gold medal	Katharina Molitor	Germany
silver medal	Lü Huihui	China
bronze medal	Sunette Viljoen	South Africa

The women's javelin throw at the 2015 World Championships in Athletics was held at the Beijing National Stadium on 28 and 30 August.

There were eight automatic qualifiers out of the first round. With the best mark qualifiers, the German team was able to get four into the finals including defending champion Christina Obergföll, the home team was able to get two when Lü Huihui got in with the tenth qualifier. World leader Sunette Viljoen also could not make the automatic but got into the finals while the world record holder Barbora Špotáková did get an automatic.

The partisan locals were overjoyed when Lü took over the lead with a 63.80 and three throws later Li Lingwei improved upon that with a 64.10, putting the home team in first and second place. That lead held through the second round as closest anybody could come was Viljoen at 63.09 to take third place. Obergföl started the third round with a new leader 64.61, but Lü came back with an answer of 64.72 which held the lead until the next thrower Katharina Molitor threw it 2 cm further. Špotáková barely made 60 and didn't get to make the last three throws. In the fourth round, Viljoen threw 65.79 to move into the lead and as the fifth round was ending, Lü uncorked a 66.13 to set a new Asian Record and take the lead to a furious ovation. That was the status going into the last throw of the competition. Molitor had seen her leading position drop to third place over the last 2 rounds but found the answer, a 67.69 to let the air out of the crowd.

== Records ==
Prior to the competition, the records were as follows:

World record	Barbora Špotáková (CZE)	72.28	Stuttgart, Germany	13 September 2008
Championship record	Maria Abakumova (RUS)	71.99	Daegu, South Korea	2 September 2011
World leading	Sunette Viljoen (RSA)	66.62	Melbourne, Australia	21 March 2015
African record	Sunette Viljoen (RSA)	69.35	New York City, United States	9 Jun 2012
Asian record	Zhang Li (CHN)	65.47	Incheon, South Korea	1 October 2014
North, Central American and Caribbean record	Olisdeilys Menéndez (CUB)	71.70	Helsinki, Finland	14 August 2005
South American record	Flor Ruiz (COL)	63.80	Xalapa, Mexico	27 November 2014
European record	Barbora Špotáková (CZE)	72.28	Stuttgart, Germany	13 September 2008
Oceanian record	Kimberley Mickle (AUS)	66.83	Melbourne, Australia	22 March 2014
The following records were established during the competition:
Asian record	Lü Huihui (CHN)	66.13	Beijing, China	30 August 2015
World leading	Katharina Molitor (GER)	67.69	Beijing, China	30 August 2015

== Qualification standards ==
Entry standards
61.00

== Schedule ==
Date	Time	Round
28 August 2015	19:00	Qualification
30 August 2015	18:45	Final

All times are local times (UTC+8)

== Results ==
KEY:	Q	Qualified	q	12 best performers	NR	National record	PB	Personal best	SB	Seasonal best

=== Qualification ===
Qualification: 63.50 m (Q) or at least 12 best performers (q).

Rank	Group	Name	Nationality	# 1	# 2	# 3	Mark	Notes
1	B	Christin Hussong	Germany	60.27	61.00	65.92	65.92	Q, PB
2	B	Li Lingwei	China	65.07			65.07	Q, SB
3	B	Barbora Špotáková	Czech Republic	60.62	65.02		65.02	Q
4	A	Brittany Borman	United States	58.24	x	64.22	64.22	Q
5	A	Christina Obergföll	Germany	x	x	64.10	64.10	Q
6	B	Elizabeth Gleadle	Canada	64.02			64.02	Q
7	A	Sunette Viljoen	South Africa	63.93			63.93	Q
8	B	Linda Stahl	Germany	62.12	61.21	63.52	63.52	Q
9	A	Katharina Molitor	Germany	60.64	59.90	63.23	63.23	q
10	A	Lü Huihui	China	59.66	63.15	–	63.15	q
11	B	Sinta Ozoliņa-Kovala	Latvia	62.81	x	x	62.81	q, SB
12	B	Kara Winger	United States	61.59	62.21	59.18	62.21	q
13	A	Madara Palameika	Latvia	59.78	x	62.17	62.17	
14	A	Zhang Li	China	61.29	61.80	56.23	61.80	SB
15	A	Hanna Hatsko-Fedusova	Ukraine	59.25	61.41	x	61.41	SB
16	B	Marharyta Dorozhon	Israel	61.04	59.79	60.63	61.04	
17	B	Kathryn Mitchell	Australia	61.04	x	x	61.04	
18	B	Yulenmis Aguilar	Cuba	60.52	59.05	58.04	60.52	
19	A	Yuki Ebihara	Japan	53.67	57.56	60.30	60.30	
20	A	Kelsey-Lee Roberts	Australia	60.18	58.03	49.78	60.18	
21	A	Tatsiana Khaladovich	Belarus	x	55.67	60.07	60.07	
22	B	Kimberley Mickle	Australia	x	59.83	x	59.83	
23	A	Martina Ratej	Slovenia	57.13	59.76	x	59.76	
24	A	Vera Rebrik	Russia	59.67	x	59.35	59.67	
25	A	Jucilene de Lima	Brazil	59.38	59.49	51.18	59.49	
26	A	Goldie Sayers	Great Britain & N.I.	58.28	58.11	x	58.28	
27	B	Flor Ruiz	Colombia	x	56.70	57.25	57.25	
28	B	Maria Andrejczyk	Poland	52.86	53.44	56.75	56.75	
29	B	Ásdís Hjálmsdóttir	Iceland	56.72	x	x	56.72	
30	B	Mariya Abakumova	Russia	56.08	55.69	x	56.08	
31	A	Sanni Utriainen	Finland	54.57	55.56	x	55.56	
32	B	Kateryna Derun	Ukraine	x	53.49	x	53.49	

=== Final ===
The final was started at 18:45

Rank	Name	Nationality	# 1	# 2	# 3	# 4	# 5	# 6	Mark	Notes
1st place, gold medalist(s)	Katharina Molitor	Germany	60.84	61.37	64.74	61.86	62.13	67.69	67.69	WL
2nd place, silver medalist(s)	Lü Huihui	China	63.80	x	64.72	59.65	66.13	63.72	66.13	AR
3rd place, bronze medalist(s)	Sunette Viljoen	South Africa	60.18	63.09	62.93	65.79	62.11	60.11	65.79	
4	Christina Obergföll	Germany	x	61.04	64.61	x	62.51	x	64.61	SB
5	Li Lingwei	China	64.10	62.56	61.94	x	62.87	x	64.10	
6	Christin Hussong	Germany	x	59.98	62.94	62.98	x	x	62.98	
7	Sinta Ozoliņa-Kovala	Latvia	62.20	60.56	x	58.88	x	x	62.20	
8	Kara Winger	United States	58.55	60.63	60.88	59.34	59.28	x	60.88	
9	Barbora Špotáková	Czech Republic	x	59.54	60.08				60.08	
10	Linda Stahl	Germany	58.82	59.69	59.88				59.88	
11	Elizabeth Gleadle	Canada	59.78	59.82	x				59.82	
12	Brittany Borman	United States	57.96	58.26	57.86				58.26	
