= Viktoriya Sudarushkina =

Russian javelin thrower

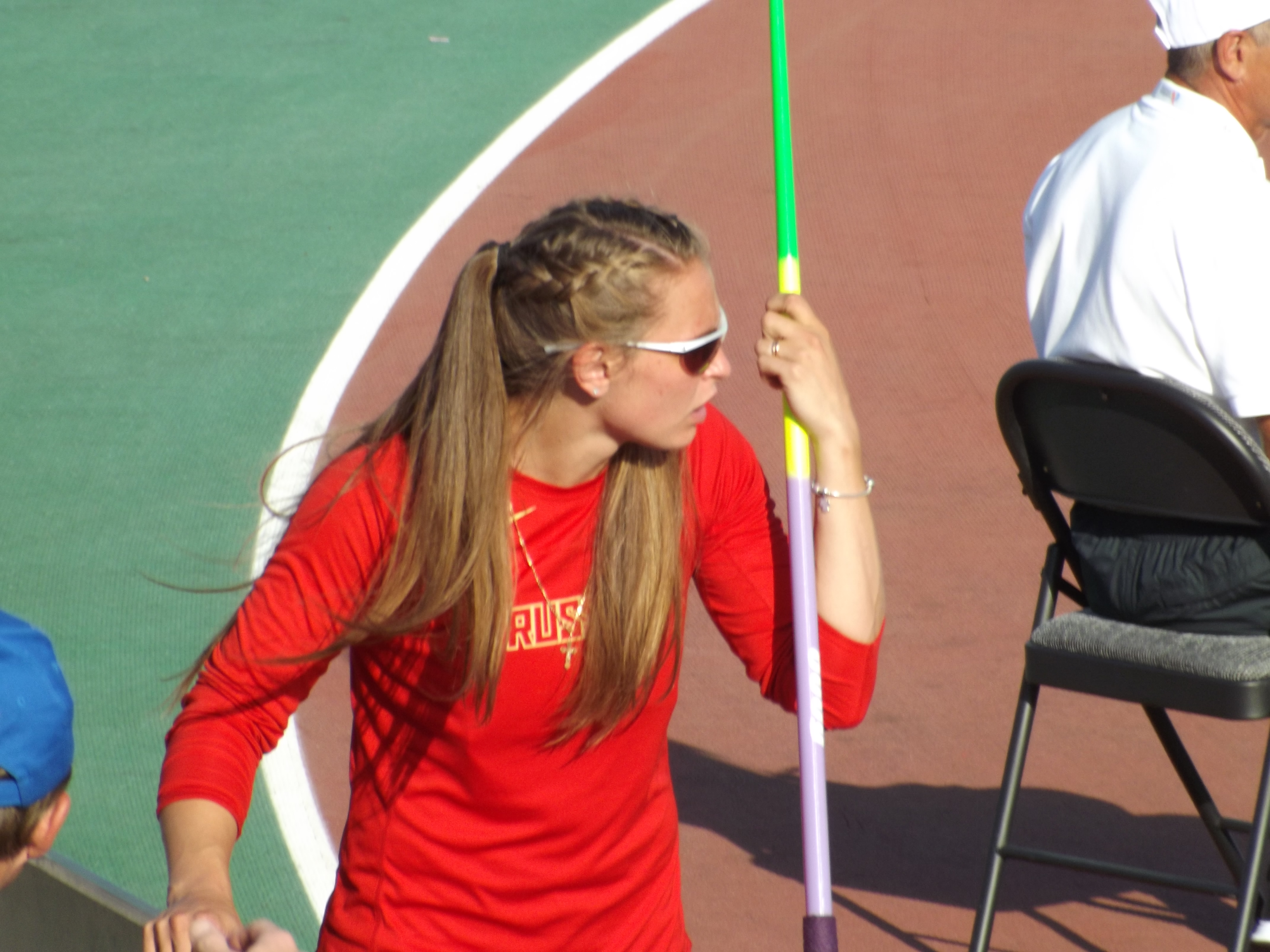
Sudarushkina at the 2015 European Team Championships

Viktoriya Viktorovna Sudarushkina (Russian: Виктория Викторовна Сударушкина; born 2 September 1990) is a Russian track and field athlete who specialises in the javelin throw. She holds a personal best of 62.78 m (205 ft 11 1/2 in), set in 2015. She represented the host nation at the 2013 World Championships in Athletics in Moscow and placed seventh in the final.

She made her international debut at the 2009 European Athletics Junior Championships, coming eighth, and made her first national podium the following year. She rose into the senior ranks in 2013. She set a best of 62.77 m (205 ft 11 1/4 in) in May and was the silver medalist at both the 2013 Summer Universiade in Kazan and at the Russian Athletics Championships. This gained her selection for the 2013 World Championships in Athletics, where she was a finalist. She was the winner at the Russian Championships in 2014 and fourth at the 2014 European Team Championships, but only cleared sixty metres once that year.

She began 2015 strongly with a winning throw of 62.78 m (205 ft 11 1/2 in) at the Russian Throws Championships and fourth at the 2015 European Cup Winter Throwing. She failed to translate this to later season success, with a mark of 52.19 m at the 2015 European Team Championships being a low point. She failed to throw beyond fifty metres at the 2016 Russian Championships.

She was suspended from international competition in 2016 due to an overarching ban on the All-Russia Athletic Federation as a response to state-sponsored doping.

== International competitions ==
Year	Competition	Venue	Position	Event	Notes
2009	European Junior Championships	Novi Sad, Serbia	8th	Javelin	49.77 m
2011	European Cup Winter Throwing	Sofia, Bulgaria	12th	Javelin	50.15 m
2013	Universiade	Kazan, Russia	2nd	Javelin	62.68 m
2013	World Championships	Moscow, Russia	7th	Javelin	62.21 m
2014	European Team Championships	Braunschweig, Germany	4th	Javelin	59.40 m
2015	European Cup Winter Throwing	Leiria, Portugal	4th	Javelin	59.06 m
2015	European Team Championships	Cheboksary, Russia	11th	Javelin	52.19 m

== National titles ==
- Russian Athletics Championships
  - Javelin throw: 2014
