= Slovenia at the 2015 World Championships in Athletics =

- WA code: SLO
- National federation: Atletska Zveza Slovenije
- Website: www.atletska-zveza.si

in Beijing
- Competitors: 8
- Medals: Gold 0 Silver 0 Bronze 0 Total 0

World Championships in Athletics appearances
- 1993; 1995; 1997; 1999; 2001; 2003; 2005; 2007; 2009; 2011; 2013; 2015; 2017; 2019; 2022; 2023; 2025

Other related appearances
- Yugoslavia (1983–1991)

Slovenia competed at the 2015 World Championships in Athletics in Beijing, China, from 22–30 August 2015.

== Results ==
(q – qualified, NM – no mark, SB – season best)

=== Men ===
Track and road events

Athlete	Event	Heat		Semifinal		Final	
Athlete	Event	Result	Rank	Result	Rank	Result	Rank
Luka Janežič	400 metres	45.28 NR	6	Did not advance			
Žan Rudolf	800 metres	1:47.24	6	Did not advance			

Field events

Athlete	Event	Qualification		Final	
Athlete	Event	Distance	Position	Distance	Position
Robert Renner	Pole vault	5.70 NR	1 Q	5.50	13

=== Women ===
Track and road events

Athlete	Event	Heat		Semifinal		Final	
Athlete	Event	Result	Rank	Result	Rank	Result	Rank
Maja Mihalinec	100 metres	11.42	4	Did not advance			
Sabina Veit	200 metres	23.18	4	Did not advance			
Maja Mihalinec	200 metres	23.05 PB	4 q	23.04 PB	8	Did not advance	
Maruša Mišmaš	3000 metres steeplechase	9:37.73	7	—N/a		Did not advance	

Field events

Athlete	Event	Qualification		Final	
Athlete	Event	Distance	Position	Distance	Position
Tina Šutej	Pole vault	NM		Did not advance	
Martina Ratej	Javelin throw	59.76	23	Did not advance	
