= Slovenia at the 2022 World Athletics Championships =

- Flag of Slovenia
- WA code: SLO

in Eugene, United States July 15, 2022 – July 24, 2022
- Competitors: 10 (3 men and 7 women)
- Medals Ranked 22nd: Gold 1 Silver 0 Bronze 0 Total 1

World Athletics Championships appearances
- 1993; 1995; 1997; 1999; 2001; 2003; 2005; 2007; 2009; 2011; 2013; 2015; 2017; 2019; 2022; 2023; 2025

Other related appearances
- Yugoslavia (1983–1991)

Slovenia competed at the 2022 World Athletics Championships in Eugene, United States, from 15 to 24 July 2022. The country was represented by 10 athletes, seven women and three men.

== Medallists ==
Medal	Name	Event	Date
Gold	Kristjan Čeh	Men's discus throw	19 July

== Results ==
Key

- Q = Qualified for the next round
- q = Qualified for the next round as a fastest loser or, in field events, by position without achieving the qualifying target
- NR = National record
- PB = Personal best
- SB = Season best
- N/A = Round not applicable for the event

=== Men ===
Track and road events

Athlete	Event	Heat		Semi-final		Final	
Athlete	Event	Result	Rank	Result	Rank	Result	Rank
Žan Rudolf	800 m	1:49.87	39	Did not advance			

Field events

Athlete	Event	Qualification		Final	
Athlete	Event	Distance	Position	Distance	Position
Robert Renner	Pole vault	5.50	27	Did not advance	
Kristjan Čeh	Discus throw	68.23	2 Q	71.13 CR	1st place, gold medalist(s)

=== Women ===
Track and road events

Athlete	Event	Heat		Semi-final		Final	
Athlete	Event	Result	Rank	Result	Rank	Result	Rank
Anita Horvat	400 m	52.67	33	Did not advance			
Anita Horvat	800 m	2:01.48	18 Q	1:59.60 PB	6 q	1:59.83	7
Jerneja Smonkar	800 m	2:02.48	31	Did not advance			
Agata Zupin	400 m hurdles	57.12	32	Did not advance			
Maruša Mišmaš-Zrimšek	3000 m Steeplechase	9:17.14 SB	11 Q	–		9:40.78	14

Field events

Athlete	Event	Qualification		Final	
Athlete	Event	Distance	Position	Distance	Position
Lia Apostolovski	High jump	1.90	=10 q	1.89	12
Tina Šutej	Pole vault	4.35	=12 q	4.70	4
Neja Filipič	Triple jump	14.05	16	Did not advance	
