= Ariana Ince =

American javelin thrower (born 1989)

Personal information
- Born: March 14, 1989 (age 37) San Antonio, Texas, U.S.
- Education: Rice University
- Height: 5 ft 12 in (183 cm)

Sport
- Sport: Track and field
- Event: Javelin throw
- College team: Rice Owls

Ariana Ince (born March 14, 1989) is an American track and field athlete specializing in the javelin throw. She represented her country at the 2017 and 2019 World Championships without qualifying for the final. In addition, she won a bronze medal at the 2019 Pan American Games.

Her personal best in the event is 64.38 metres set in Zagreb in 2022.

She qualified to represent the United States at the 2020 Summer Olympics.

== International competitions ==
Year	Competition	Venue	Position	Event	Notes
Representing the United States
2017	World Championships	London, United Kingdom	28th (q)	Javelin throw	54.52 m
2018	NACAC Championships	Toronto, Canada	1st	Javelin throw	59.59 m
2019	Pan American Games	Lima, Peru	3rd	Javelin throw	62.32 m
2019	World Championships	Doha, Qatar	15th (q)	Javelin throw	60.44 m
2021	Olympic Games	Tokyo, Japan	27th (q)	Javelin throw	54.98 m
2022	World Championships	Eugene, United States	18th (q)	Javelin throw	57.24 m
2022	NACAC Championships	Freeport, Bahamas	2nd	Javelin throw	59.69 m
2023	World Championships	Budapest, Hungary	27th (q)	Javelin throw	54.60 m
2026	Pan American Championships	Medellín, Colombia	3rd	Javelin throw	51.69 m
