= Slovenia at the 2017 World Championships in Athletics =

- WA code: SLO
- Website: www.atletska-zveza.si

in London
- Competitors: 7 in 7 events
- Medals: Gold 0 Silver 0 Bronze 0 Total 0

World Championships in Athletics appearances
- 1993; 1995; 1997; 1999; 2001; 2003; 2005; 2007; 2009; 2011; 2013; 2015; 2017; 2019; 2022; 2023

Other related appearances
- Yugoslavia (1983–1991)

Slovenia competed at the 2017 World Championships in Athletics in London, United Kingdom, from 4–13 August 2017.

== Results ==
(q – qualified, NM – no mark, SB – season best)

=== Men ===
Track and road events

Athlete	Event	Heat		Semifinal		Final	
Athlete	Event	Result	Rank	Result	Rank	Result	Rank
Luka Janežič	400 metres	46.06	36	Did not advance			
Rok Puhar	Marathon	—				2:33:12	66

=== Women ===
Track and road events

Athlete	Event	Heat		Semifinal		Final	
Athlete	Event	Result	Rank	Result	Rank	Result	Rank
Anita Horvat	400 metres	52.78	38	Did not advance			
Agata Zupin	400 metres hurdles	56.54	27 Q	57.05	21	Did not advance	

Field events

Athlete	Event	Qualification		Final	
Athlete	Event	Distance	Position	Distance	Position
Maruša Černjul	High jump	1.89	=13	Did not advance	
Tina Šutej	Pole vault	4.35	=15	Did not advance	
Martina Ratej	Javelin throw	65.64 SB	2 Q	61.05	9
