= Slovenia at the 2013 World Championships in Athletics =

- WA code: SLO
- National federation: Atletska Zveza Slovenije
- Website: www.atletska-zveza.si

in Moscow
- Competitors: 9
- Medals: Gold 0 Silver 0 Bronze 0 Total 0

World Championships in Athletics appearances
- 1993; 1995; 1997; 1999; 2001; 2003; 2005; 2007; 2009; 2011; 2013; 2015; 2017; 2019; 2022; 2023

Other related appearances
- Yugoslavia (1983–1991)

Slovenia competed at the 2013 World Championships in Athletics in Moscow, Russia, from 10 to 18 August 2013. A team of 9 athletes was announced to represent the country in the event.

== Results ==
(q – qualified, NM – no mark, SB – season best)

=== Men ===
Athlete	Event	Preliminaries		Final	
Athlete	Event	Time/Mark	Rank	Time/Mark	Rank
Primož Kozmus	Hammer throw	78,10 m	3 Q	79.22	4
Rožle Prezelj	High jump	2,17 m	25	-	-
Jan Žumer	200 m	21,35	42	-	-

=== Women ===
Athlete	Event	Preliminaries		Final	
Athlete	Event	Time/Mark	Rank	Time/Mark	Rank
Daneja Grandovec	Marathon	-	-	3:10:46 (SB)	46.
Martina Ratej	Javelin throw	57,95 m	20	-	-
Snežana Rodič	Triple jump	14,17 m	q	14,13 m	9
Sonja Roman	1500 m	4:08.58	q	-	-
Barbara Špiler	Hammer throw	64,58 m	25	-	-
Marina Tomič	100 m hurdles	13,26	25	-	-
