= Slovenia at the 2009 World Championships in Athletics =

- WA code: SLO

in Berlin
- Competitors: 13
- Medals: Gold 1 Silver 0 Bronze 0 Total 1

World Championships in Athletics appearances
- 1993; 1995; 1997; 1999; 2001; 2003; 2005; 2007; 2009; 2011; 2013; 2015; 2017; 2019; 2022; 2023

Other related appearances
- Yugoslavia (1983–1991)

Slovenia was represented at the 2009 World Championships in Athletics from 15–23 August in Berlin by 13 athletes.

Primož Kozmus won the gold medal in men's hammer throw, defending his 2008 Summer Olympics title and achieving the biggest success of Slovenian athletes in the history of World Championships.
