= Lü Huihui =

Chinese javelin thrower (born 1989)

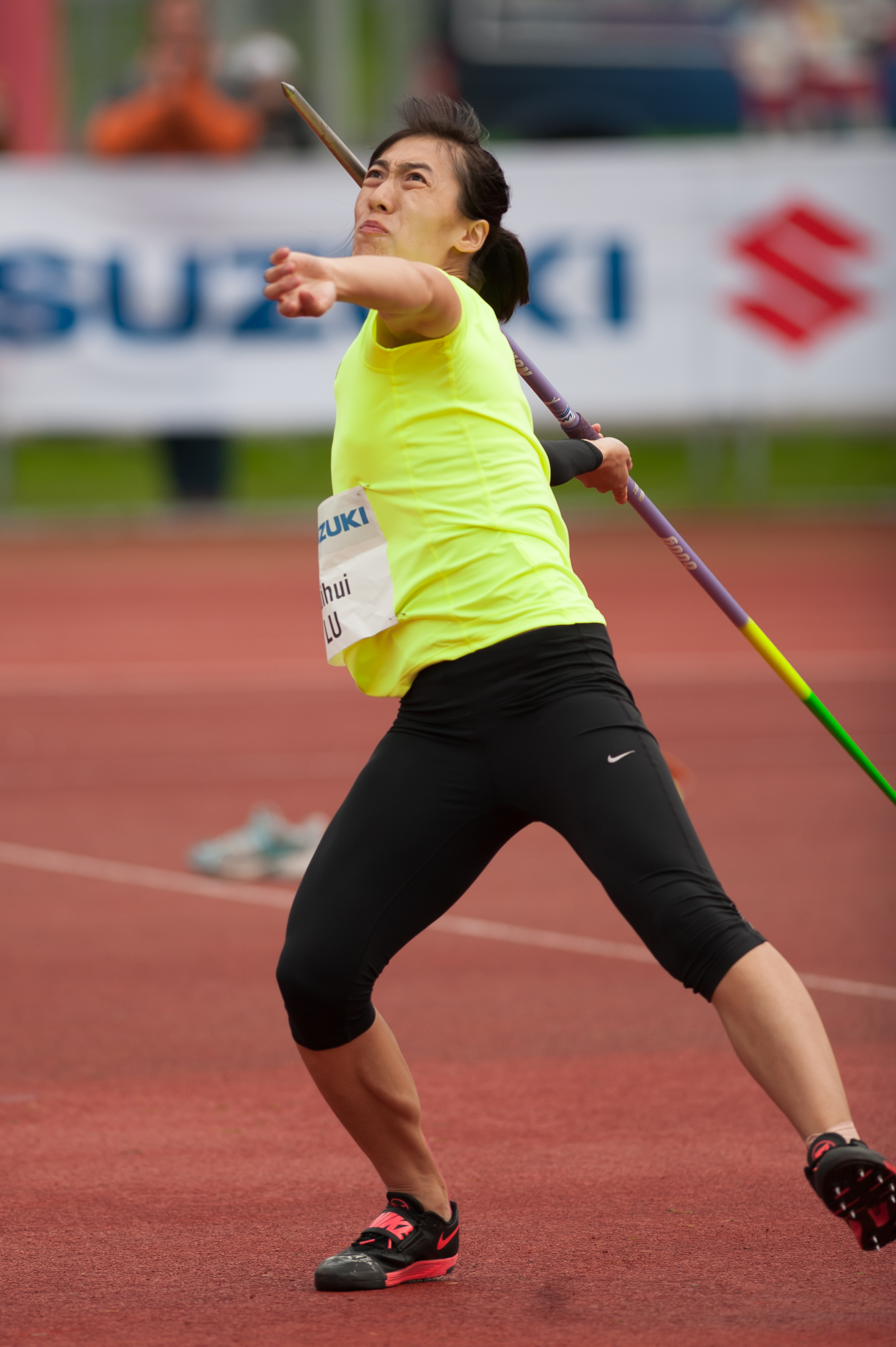

Personal information
- Nationality: Chinese
- Born: June 26, 1989 (age 37) Xinxiang, China
- Height: 1.71 m (5 ft 7 in)
- Weight: 68 kg (150 lb)

Sport
- Country: China
- Sport: Athletics
- Event: Javelin throw
- Coached by: Lu Gang

Achievements and titles
- Personal bests: AR 67.59 m (2017)
Medal record
World Championships
Silver medal – second place	2015 Beijing	Javelin throw
Bronze medal – third place	2017 London	Javelin throw
Bronze medal – third place	2019 Doha	Javelin throw
Continental Cup
Gold medal – first place	2018 Ostrava	Javelin throw

Lü Huihui (Chinese: 吕会会; born 26 June 1989) is a Chinese athlete who competes in the javelin throw. She won the silver medal at the 2015 World Championships and bronze medals at the 2017 and 2019 World Championships.

A late-bloomer in the event, she did not throw beyond fifty metres until her twenties, but broke the Asian record for the event in 2012 with a mark of 64.95 m. She improved this to 66.13 m in 2015 and to an Asian record of 67.59 m in 2017.

== Career ==
Born in Xinxiang in the province of Henan, she began taking part in javelin competitions as a teenager. In 2005, she was fifth at the national youth championships and came runner-up at the national high school championships. Lu started to attend Zhengzhou University in 2007 and stopped competing in the sport at that point.

A return to competition in 2010 (her final year at Zhengzhou) saw her begin to make an impact at senior level as she threw over fifty metres for the first time. She won the division two universities title and set a best of 55.35 metres at the Zhaoqing leg of the Chinese Athletics Grand Prix series. On the following year's circuit she improved to 58.72 metres and was in the top two at all the meets, winning in Jiaxing. This form failed to translate at the Chinese Athletics Championships, however, as she threw only 52.69 metres and finished 13th in her first national final. She began attended the Wuhan Institute of Physical Education in 2011, learning the event under her coach Lu Gang.

Her 2012 season marked a quick rise to the top of her discipline. She bettered her previous personal record by over five metres with a mark of 63.78 m in her first meet of the season. Her next outing brought her the Asian record, as she broke Wei Jianhua's 11-year-old mark with a 64.95 m performance. Lu competed abroad for the first time, appearing at two German meets, and a second-place finish at the National Grand Prix final as well as a throw of 64.86 m in Dalian assured her selection for the Chinese delegation for the 2012 London Olympics.

Despite having never competed at a major championship, or the Chinese City Games nor the National Games of China, she threw 64.45 m in qualifying and went on to place fifth in the Olympic javelin final. Her worst overall performance that year was at the Chinese Championships, which was the only meet where sere she did reach sixty metres, but her runner-up placing behind Chang Chunfeng was still her best ever performance nationally.

Lü opened 2013 as she had the previous year, winning on the national circuit and breaking the Asian record – this time with a throw of 65.62 m. In April 2014 IAAF announced that Lü had tested positive for a prohibited substance at the competition where she'd set the record, and that she had been serving a 1-year doping ban from 24 May 2013 to 23 May 2014.

At the 2015 World Championships, she won a silver medal, with a throw of 66.13 m, a then Asian record. It was China's first medal in the women's javelin since 1991. That year she also won the Shanghai Diamond League meet.

She competed at the 2016 Olympics, finishing in 7th.

As well as setting a new personal best, in 2017 she also won a bronze medal at the World Championships, with a throw of 65.26 m.
