= Pacatuba, Ceará =

Municipality in Ceará, Brazil

- Municipality
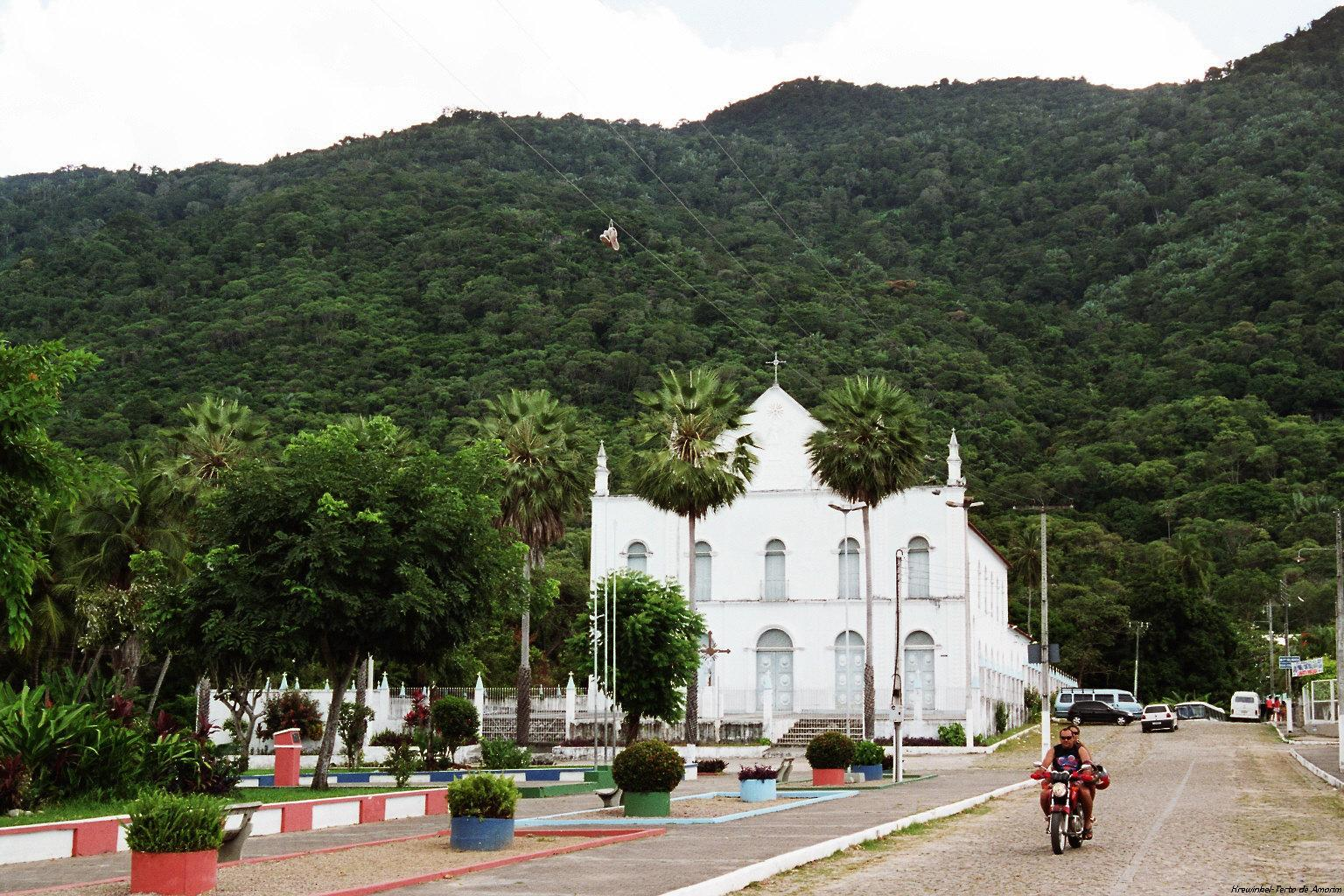

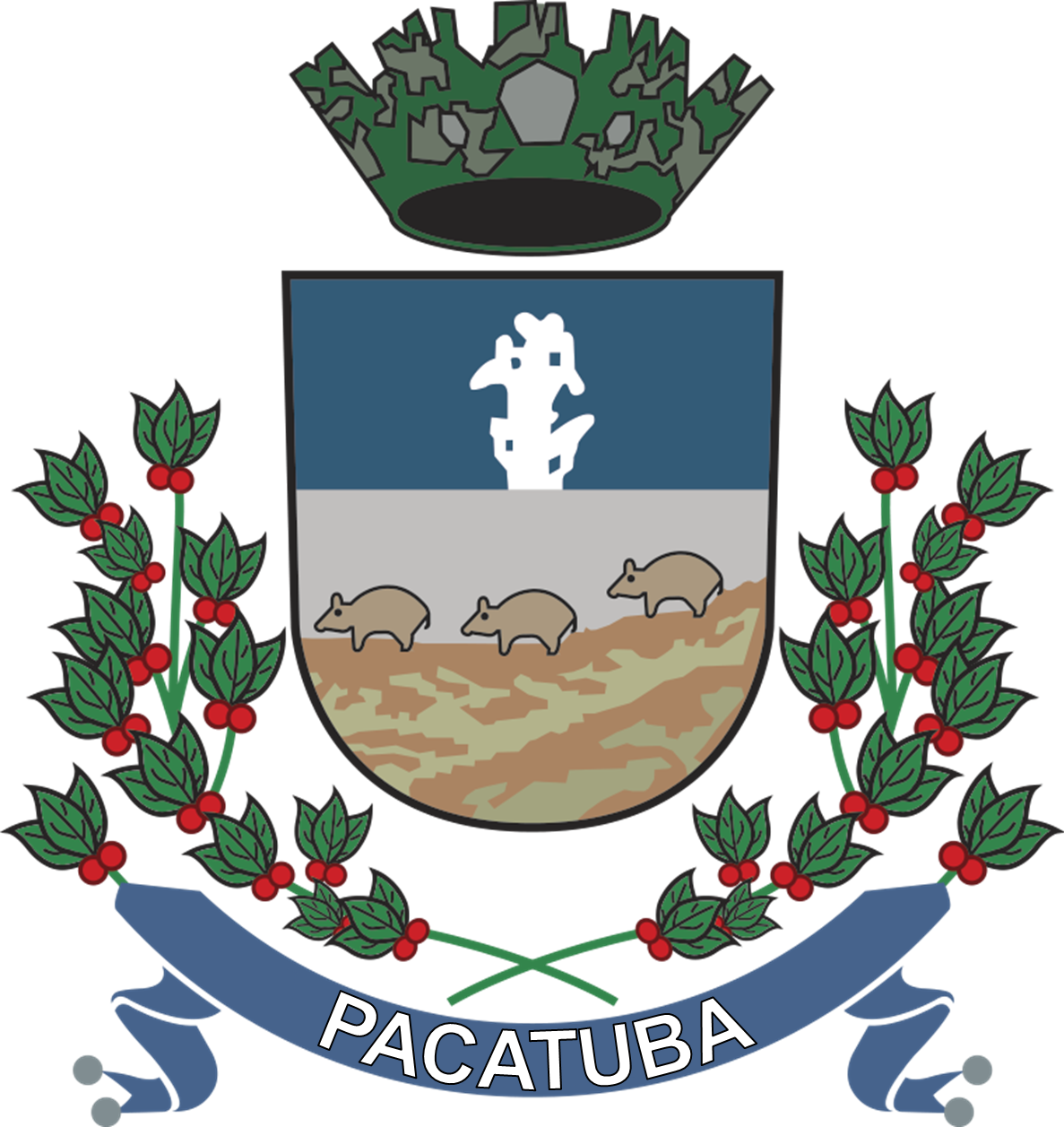
- Flag Coat of arms

- Location in Brazil
- Coordinates: 03°59′04″S 38°36′58″W
- Country: Brazil
- Region: Nordeste
- State: Ceará
- Mesoregion: Metropolitana de Fortaleza
- Founded: 1869

Area
  - Total: 145.08 km^{2} (56.02 sq mi)
- Elevation: 67 m (220 ft)

Population (2020)
  - Total: 84,554
  - Density: 582.81/km^{2} (1,509.5/sq mi)
- Time zone: UTC−3 (BRT)
- Postal code: 61800
- Area code: (+55) 85
- Website: pacatuba.ce.gov.br

Pacatuba, Ceará is a municipality in the state of Ceará in the Northeast region of Brazil.

== See also ==
- List of municipalities in Ceará
