= Mariya Abakumova =

Russian javelin thrower

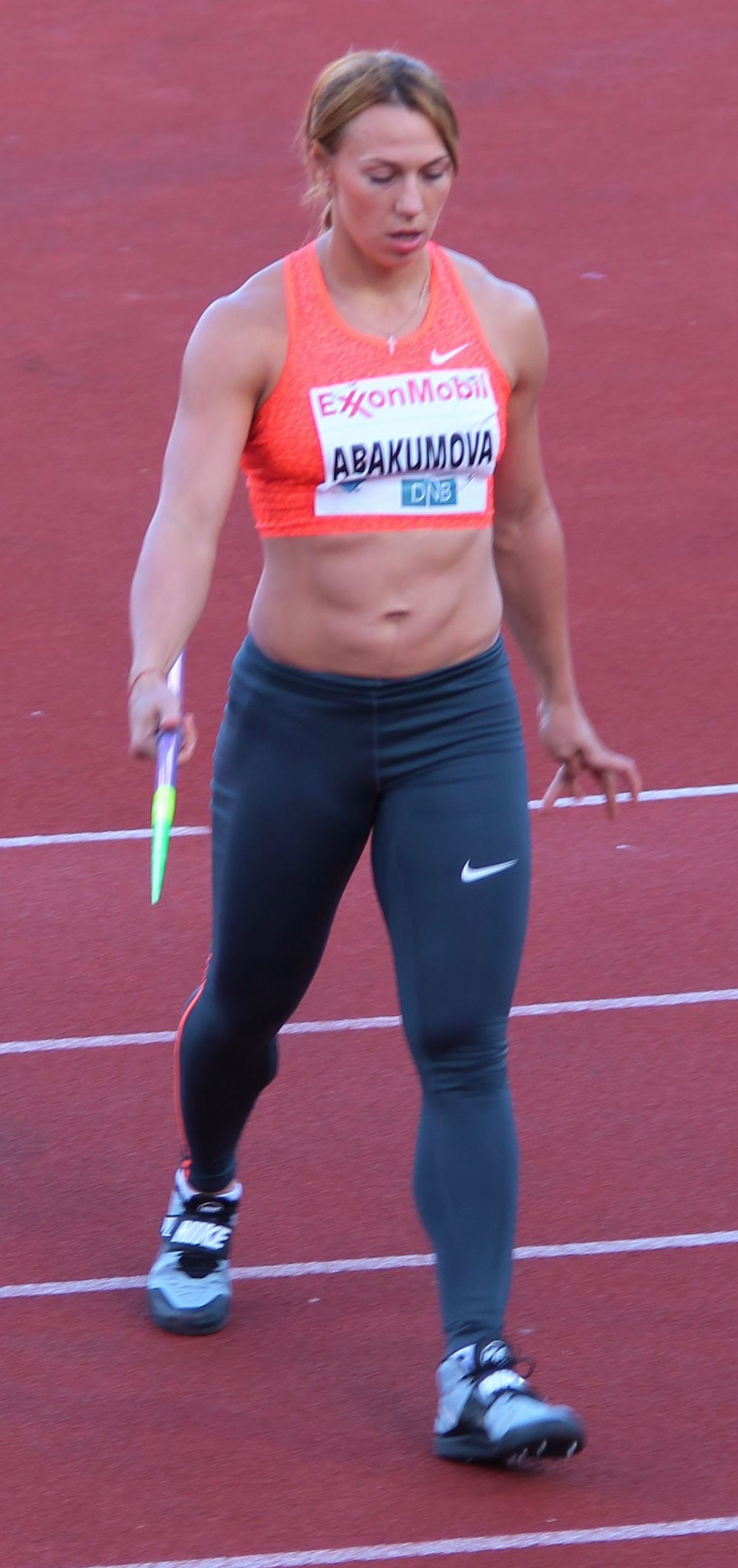
- Abakumova in 2015

Personal information
- Full name: Mariya Vasiliyevna Abakumova
- Nationality: Russian
- Born: 15 January 1986 (age 40) Stavropol, Soviet Union
- Height: 1.79 m (5 ft 10 in)
- Weight: 80 kg (176 lb)

Sport
- Country: Russia
- Sport: Women's athletics
- Event: Javelin throw
- Club: CSKA Moscow
Medal record
Olympic Games
| Disqualified | 2008 Beijing | Javelin throw |
World Championships
| Bronze medal – third place | 2013 Moscow | Javelin throw |
| Disqualified | 2011 Daegu | Javelin throw |
| Disqualified | 2009 Berlin | Javelin throw |
Summer Universiade
| Gold medal – first place | 2013 Kazan | Javelin throw |
Representing Europe
Continental Cup
| Disqualified | 2010 Split | Javelin throw |

Mariya Vasiliyevna Abakumova (Russian: Мария Васильевна Абакумова; born 15 January 1986) is a Russian former track and field athlete who competed in the javelin throw.

== Career ==
Abakumova discovered her love for athletics and throwing through her coach Irina Vladimirovna Kamarova. Her parents were also active in athletics and served as role models.

Abakumova is a two-time Olympian; she competed at the 2008 and 2012 Summer Olympics. In 2008 she initially won silver. In 2012 she initially finished tenth. She also initially won gold at the 2011 World Championships. In 2013, she won the Summer Universiade with a throw of 65.12 m, and later that year she won bronze at the World Championships with a 65.09 m throw.

In May 2016, it was reported that Abakumova was one of 14 Russian athletes, and nine medalists, implicated in doping following the retesting of urine from the 2008 Olympic Games. Abakumova was named by Russian press agency TASS as having failed the retest, which was undertaken following the Russian doping scandal of 2015 and 2016. If confirmed, under IOC and IAAF rules, Abakumova stood to lose all results, medals, and records from the date of the original test to May 2016. On 13 September 2016, her doping was confirmed by the IOC. Her results at the 2008 Olympics were voided, and she had to return the medal she won. Abakumova appealed the IOC's decision to the Court of Arbitration for Sport (CAS). On 26 July 2018 the CAS dismissed Abakumova's appeal and upheld the IOC's decision.

== Personal life ==
Abakumova is married to the Russian javelin thrower Dmitry Tarabin. In June 2014 she had twins who were named Kira and Milana.

== International competitions ==
Representing Russia
| Year | Competition | Venue | Position | Event | Result | Notes |
|---|---|---|---|---|---|---|
| 2003 | World Youth Championships | Sherbrooke, Canada | 4th | Javelin throw | 51.41 m | |
| 2004 | World Junior Championships | Grosseto, Italy | 25th (q) | Javelin throw | 43.95 m | |
| 2005 | Universiade | İzmir, Turkey | 8th | Javelin throw | 53.48 m | |
| 2007 | European U23 Championships | Debrecen, Hungary | 6th | Javelin throw | 54.25 m | |
| 2007 | World Championships | Osaka, Japan | 7th | Javelin throw | 61.43 m | |
| 2008 | Olympic Games | Beijing, China | DQ (2nd) | Javelin throw | 70.78 m | Doping |
| 2009 | World Championships | Berlin, Germany | DQ (3rd) | Javelin throw | 66.06 m | Doping |
| 2009 | World Athletics Final | Thessaloniki, Greece | DQ (1st) | Javelin throw | 64.60 m | Doping |
| 2010 | European Cup Winter Throwing | Arles, France | DQ (2nd) | Javelin throw | 65.21 m | Doping |
| 2010 | European Championships | Barcelona, Spain | DQ (5th) | Javelin throw | 61.46 m | Doping |
| 2010 | Continental Cup | Split, Croatia | DQ (1st) | Javelin throw | 68.14 m | Doping, CR |
| 2011 | World Championships | Daegu, South Korea | DQ (1st) | Javelin throw | 71.99 m | Doping, NR CR |
| 2012 | Olympic Games | London, United Kingdom | DQ (10th) | Javelin throw | 59.34 m | Doping |
| 2013 | Universiade | Kazan, Russia | 1st | Javelin throw | 65.12 m | |
| 2013 | World Championships | Moscow, Russia | 3rd | Javelin throw | 65.09 m | |
| 2015 | World Championships | Beijing, China | 30th (q) | Javelin throw | 56.08 m | |

== See also ==
- List of doping cases in athletics
- List of stripped Olympic medals
- List of World Athletics Championships medalists (women)
- Doping at the Olympic Games
- Doping in Russia
