= Alicia DeShasier =

American javelin thrower (b. 1984)

Personal information
- Born: 15 April 1984 (age 42) Carrollton, Illinois, United States

Sport
- Sport: Track and field
- Club: SIUE Cougars
Medal record
Women's athletics
Representing the United States
Pan American Games
Gold medal – first place	2011 Guadalajara	Javelin throw

Alicia DeShasier McConnell (born April 15, 1984) is an American track and field athlete who competes in the javelin throw. She won the gold medal in the event at the 2011 Pan American Games.

== Biography ==
Raised in Carrollton, Illinois, DeShasier was a women's basketball and softball player at Carrollton High School. She helped her school win consecutive state Class A basketball championships in 2001 and 2002. When the 2002 softball team was state Class A runner-up, two-sport star DeShasier was named as Illinois's female high school athlete of the year.

She followed her older sister, Liz, to Southern Illinois University Edwardsville (SIUE) where she was a four-year star on the SIUE Cougars softball team that was selected for the NCAA Division II tournament in all four of her playing years and won the Great Lakes Valley Conference (GLVC) championship in 2006. She played every position on her team and was picked for the GLVS All-Conference team three times, was named the 2006 GLVC Player of the Year, and was a 2006 Division II First Team All-American. After finishing her softball career and while completing her SIUE studies in civil engineering, DeShasier was encouraged to use her final year of athletic eligibility on the Cougars track and field team. There she took up the javelin throw for the first time, and her softball throwing skills translated well, as she broke the school record at her first competitive meet. Having the nation's longest throw of the season, she was an automatic qualifier for the NCAA championships, where she finished tenth, despite a shoulder injury. She received her bachelor's degree in Civil Engineering from SIUE in 2007. After working as a civil engineer at Oates Associates in Collinsville, Illinois, DeShasier moved to Madison, Wisconsin to work in designing highways for Strand Associates, Inc. and volunteer as an assistant coach for the Wisconsin Badgers track and field team. DeShasier now works for Michael Baker International in Madison, WI. In 2012, DeShasier was elected to the GLVC Hall of Fame. In 2017, she was elected to the SIUE Athletics Hall of Fame. In December, 2017, she and her sisters Liz and Shosha were named to the Illinois Basketball Coaches Association (IBCA) Hall of Fame.

DeShasier began to compete at senior national level in 2008. She threw a personal record of 53.74 m in Edwardsville that July and came close to that mark to take fifth place overall at the United States Olympic Trials. She improved in both placing and performance at the 2009 USA Outdoor Track and Field Championships, coming fourth with a new best mark of 55.08 m. She had a similar peak the following year, as her throw of 55.53 m at the 2010 nationals brought her her first podium finish at the event, taking third place behind Kara Patterson and Rachel Yurkovich. These finishing positions were repeated at the 2011 USA Outdoors and although she did not have the qualifying standard for the 2011 World Championships in Athletics, she was selected for the 2011 Pan American Games instead.

In spite of a lack of experience of international competitions, DeShasier excelled at the Pan American Games in Guadalajara, improving her best by over two meters with a throw of 58.01 m (190 ft 4 in) and defeating the more favored Yanet Cruz to win the gold medal in the event. Reflecting on her win she said: "I was an underdog but I prefer to be in that position...no eyes are on you". Her winning throw at the Pan-American Games was the seventh longest ever by an American woman.
