= Yanet Cruz =

Cuban javelin thrower (born 1988)

Personal information
- Full name: Yanet Cruz Cruz
- Born: 8 February 1988 (age 38) Jiguaní, Granma, Cuba
- Height: 1.70 m (5 ft 7 in)
- Weight: 70 kg (154 lb)

Sport
- Country: Cuba
- Sport: Athletics
- Event: Javelin
Medal record
Pan American Games
Bronze medal – third place	2011 Guadalajara	Javelin throw
World Youth Championships
Bronze medal – third place	2005 Marrakesh	Javelin throw
- Updated on 27 June 2013

Yanet Cruz Cruz (born 8 February 1988) is a Cuban javelin thrower and baseball player. She won the bronze medal at the 2005 World Youth Championships. She also competed at the 2008 and 2012 Olympic Games without reaching the final round. Her personal best throw is 63.50 metres, achieved in March 2011 in Havana.

Cruz represented her country at the 2015 Pan American Games women's baseball tournament, where the team finished in fifth (and last place).

== Personal best ==
- Javelin throw: 63.50 m – Havana, Cuba, 19 March 2011

== Achievements ==
Year	Tournament	Venue	Result	Extra
Representing Cuba
2005	World Youth Championships	Marrakesh, Morocco	3rd	51.66 m
2008	Central American and Caribbean Championships	Cali, Colombia	2nd	56.14 m
2008	Olympic Games	Beijing, China	19th (q)	58.06 m
2009	ALBA Games	Havana, Cuba	1st	59.47 m
2009	Central American and Caribbean Championships	Havana, Cuba	1st	61.28 m
2009	World Championships	Berlin, Germany	22nd (q)	56.19 m
2011	World Championships	Daegu, South Korea	23rd (q)	56.73 m
2011	Pan American Games	Guadalajara, Mexico	3rd	56.19 m
2012	Olympic Games	London, United Kingdom	–	NM
