= Athletic Federation of Slovenia =

Sports governing body in Slovenia

- Atletska zveza Slovenije
- Sport: Athletics
- Abbreviation: AZS
- Founded: 12 June 1948
- Affiliation: World Athletics
- Regional affiliation: EA
- Headquarters: Ljubljana, Slovenia
- President: mag. Primož Feguš
- Secretary: Nejc Jeraša

Official website
- slovenska-atletika.si
- (Slovenia)

The Athletic Federation of Slovenia (Slovene: Atletska zveza Slovenije) is the governing body for the sport of athletics in Slovenia.

== Affiliations ==
- World Athletics
- European Athletic Association (EA)
- Slovenian Olympic Committee
- Association of the Balkan Athletics Federations (ABAF)

== National records ==
AZS maintains the Slovenian records in athletics.
