= 2011 European Athletics U23 Championships – Women's javelin throw =

The Women's javelin throw event at the 2011 European Athletics U23 Championships was held in Ostrava, Czech Republic, at Městský stadion on 14 and 16 July.

== Medalists ==
Gold	Sarah Mayer; Germany
Silver	Vira Rebryk; Ukraine
Bronze	Oona Sormunen; Finland

== Results ==
=== Final ===
16 July 2011 / 19:00

Rank	Name	Nationality	Attempts						Result	Notes
Rank	Name	Nationality	1	2	3	4	5	6	Result	Notes
1st place, gold medalist(s)	Sarah Mayer	Germany	52.41	58.48	55.20	59.29	53.94	57.82	59.29	PB
2nd place, silver medalist(s)	Vira Rebryk	Ukraine	58.95	57.98	54.47	55.80	x	57.83	58.95	
3rd place, bronze medalist(s)	Oona Sormunen	Finland	54.16	53.58	57.67	55.69	58.54	x	58.54	PB
4	Sanni Utriainen	Finland	50.19	56.25	54.53	51.85	-	x	56.25	
5	Hanna Hatsko	Ukraine	55.33	55.58	x	54.66	53.74	54.16	55.58	
6	Anna Wessman	Sweden	53.01	52.80	55.50	52.54	x	52.89	55.50	SB
7	Tatjana Jelača	Serbia	54.60	55.44	x	52.08	x	54.67	55.44	SB
8	Lisanne Schol	Netherlands	51.33	53.77	x	x	x	50.69	53.77	
9	Bernarda Letnar	Slovenia	50.36	53.44	51.30				53.44	
10	Vanda Juhász	Hungary	51.38	51.93	50.10				51.93	
11	Elia Pascual	Spain	49.77	48.94	50.70				50.70	SB
12	Matilde Andraud	France	50.61	49.07	48.01				50.61	

=== Qualifications ===
Qualified: qualifying perf. 54.00 (Q) or 12 best performers (q) to the advance to the Final

==== Summary ====
Rank	Name	Nationality	Result	Notes
1	Oona Sormunen	Finland	58.72	Q PB
2	Lisanne Schol	Netherlands	57.50	Q PB
3	Vira Rebryk	Ukraine	57.06	Q
4	Sanni Utriainen	Finland	55.19	Q
5	Anna Wessman	Sweden	55.19	Q SB
6	Sarah Mayer	Germany	54.55	Q
7	Matilde Andraud	France	54.24	Q SB
8	Tatjana Jelača	Serbia	54.10	Q SB
9	Hanna Hatsko	Ukraine	53.65	q
10	Vanda Juhász	Hungary	53.56	q
11	Bernarda Letnar	Slovenia	52.75	q
12	Elia Pascual	Spain	51.32	q PB
13	Živa Klarer Rebec	Slovenia	51.06	
14	Denitsa Koleva	Bulgaria	50.54	PB
15	Meryem Öcal	Turkey	50.51	
16	Eliza Toader	Romania	50.26	
17	Gundega Grīva	Latvia	49.38	PB
18	Anikó Ormay	Hungary	49.31	SB
19	Piia Pyykkinen	Finland	48.94	
20	Marte Aaltvedt	Norway	48.79	
21	Andreea Ciobanu	Romania	48.41	
22	Nikola Ogrodníková	Czech Republic	48.04	
23	Viktorija Barvičiūtė	Lithuania	46.62	
24	Ieva Ščiukauskaitė	Lithuania	42.34	

==== Details ====
===== Group A =====
14 July 2011 / 18:05

Rank	Name	Nationality	Attempts			Result	Notes
Rank	Name	Nationality	1	2	3	Result	Notes
1	Lisanne Schol	Netherlands	52.27	57.50		57.50	Q PB
2	Vira Rebryk	Ukraine	53.66	57.06		57.06	Q
3	Anna Wessman	Sweden	55.19			55.19	Q SB
4	Vanda Juhász	Hungary	53.56	-	-	53.56	q
5	Bernarda Letnar	Slovenia	52.37	49.29	52.75	52.75	q
6	Meryem Öcal	Turkey	50.30	50.51	49.25	50.51	
7	Gundega Grīva	Latvia	48.25	46.17	49.38	49.38	PB
8	Piia Pyykkinen	Finland	45.81	48.94	48.83	48.94	
9	Marte Aaltvedt	Norway	45.57	48.79	46.01	48.79	
10	Andreea Ciobanu	Romania	47.35	x	48.41	48.41	
11	Nikola Ogrodníková	Czech Republic	43.19	47.84	48.04	48.04	
12	Ieva Ščiukauskaitė	Lithuania	40.33	42.34	41.06	42.34	

===== Group B =====
14 July 2011 / 19:15

Rank	Name	Nationality	Attempts			Result	Notes
Rank	Name	Nationality	1	2	3	Result	Notes
1	Oona Sormunen	Finland	58.72			58.72	Q PB
2	Sanni Utriainen	Finland	52.17	55.19		55.19	Q
3	Sarah Mayer	Germany	51.18	53.48	54.55	54.55	Q
4	Matilde Andraud	France	50.60	52.20	54.24	54.24	Q SB
5	Tatjana Jelača	Serbia	54.10			54.10	Q SB
6	Hanna Hatsko	Ukraine	53.11	x	53.65	53.65	q
7	Elia Pascual	Spain	49.59	50.57	51.32	51.32	q PB
8	Živa Klarer Rebec	Slovenia	50.18	48.05	51.06	51.06	
9	Denitsa Koleva	Bulgaria	48.79	50.54	45.37	50.54	PB
10	Eliza Toader	Romania	46.49	47.58	50.26	50.26	
11	Anikó Ormay	Hungary	47.20	48.77	49.31	49.31	SB
12	Viktorija Barvičiūtė	Lithuania	46.62	x	x	46.62	

== Participation ==
According to an unofficial count, 24 athletes from 17 countries participated in the event.

- Bulgaria (1)
- Czech Republic (1)
- Finland (3)
- France (1)
- Germany (1)
- Hungary (2)
- Latvia (1)
- Lithuania (2)
- Netherlands (1)
- Norway (1)
- Romania (2)
- Serbia (1)
- Slovenia (2)
- Spain (1)
- Sweden (1)
- Turkey (1)
- Ukraine (2)
