= 2010 European Cup Winter Throwing =

2010 European Throwing Cup
- Events: 16

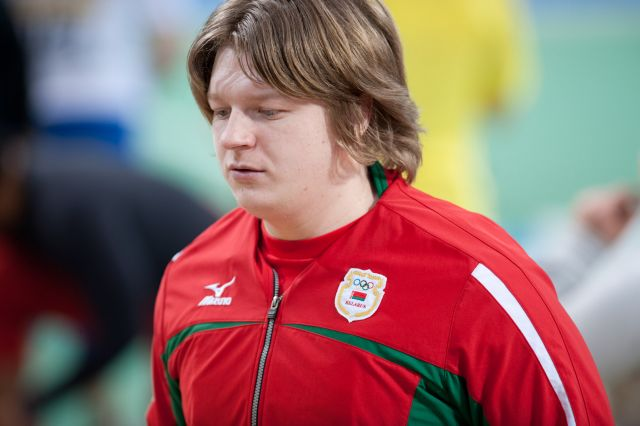
The women's shot put winner – Nadzeya Astapchuk

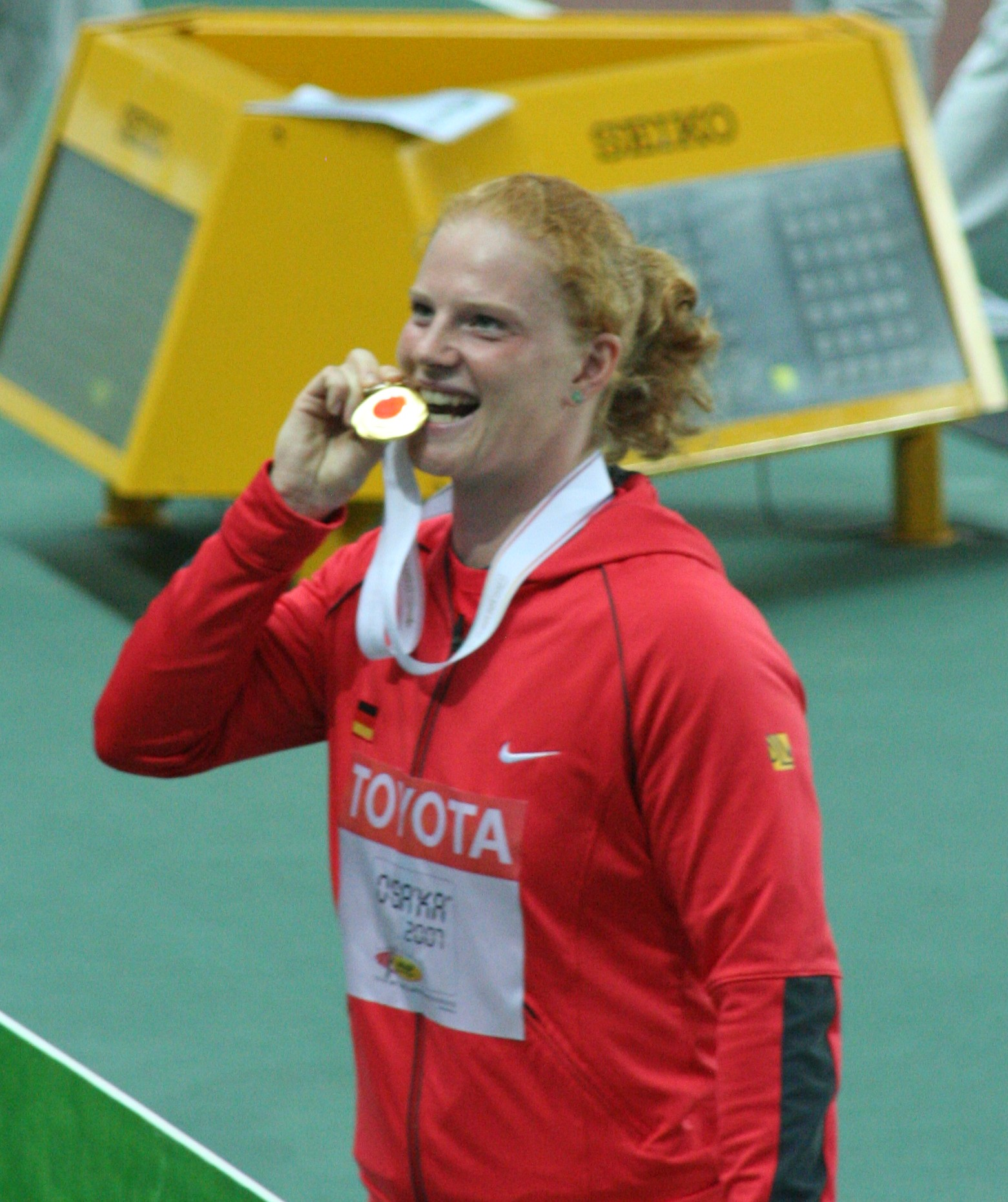
Betty Heidler won the women's hammer contest

The 2010 European Cup Winter Throwing was held on 20 and 21 March 2010 at the Stade Fernand Fournier in Arles, France. It was the tenth edition of the athletics competition for throwing events and it was organised by the European Athletics Association and the Fédération française d'athlétisme (French athletics federation).

The competition featured men's and women's contests in shot put, discus throw, javelin throw and hammer throw. In addition to the senior competitions, there were also under-23 events for younger athletes.

Andrei Mikhnevich of Belarus was the original winner of the shot put (and a frequent world medallist during the period). In 2013 all his results from August 2005 onwards were annulled after a retest of his doping sample from the 2005 World Championships in Athletics proved to be positive, resulting in a lifetime ban for the athlete.

On the first day of competition, Andrei Mikhnevich easily won the men's shot put competition, even though his winning mark of 21.04 metres was somewhat short of his earlier form in the season. Nadine Müller had the women's discus gold all wrapped up and used her last throw to attain a new personal best of 64.30 m in the event. The women's hammer competition was a modest affair in terms of distance but Betty Heidler still won the gold by some metres. Russian javelin thrower Ilya Korotkov led the men's contest throughout and asserted his strength with a last round throw of 83.28 m.

The final day of the meeting was highlighted by Martina Ratej's first round Slovenian record throw to win the women's javelin contest, upsetting the defending champion and favourite Mariya Abakumova. Markus Münch provided his second personal best in as many years at the Winter Throwing event, but on this occasion his best was enough to take the gold in the men's discus. Following gold at the 2010 World Indoors, Nadzeya Astapchuk dominated the women's shot put: six of her throws that day were enough to win, although an injury hampered her performance and she was far from her best form. The men's hammer was a close contest with the experienced Nicola Vizzoni just keeping the young Belarusian Yury Shayunou at bay. Sandra Perković was one of the stand-out performers in the under-23s competition: having set a Croatian national record in the discus in the weeks prior to the competition, she won the women's gold with a throw of 61.93 m – which would have been enough for a silver medal in the senior ranks.

== Medal summary ==
=== Senior ===
Men
Event	Gold		Silver		Bronze	
Shot put	Asmir Kolašinac (SRB)	20.15 m	Lajos Kürthy (HUN)	20.07 m	Marco Fortes (POR)	19.85 m
Discus throw	Markus Münch (GER)	65.37 m PB	Mario Pestano (ESP)	63.78 m	Sergiu Ursu (ROM)	61.19 m
Hammer throw	Nicola Vizzoni (ITA)	76.63 m	Yury Shayunou (BLR)	76.30 m	Aleksey Zagornyi (RUS)	75.58 m
Javelin throw	Ilya Korotkov (RUS)	83.28 m	Oleksandr Pyatnytsya (UKR)	79.38 m	Paweł Rakoczy (POL)	78.13 m
WR world record | AR area record | CR championship record | GR games record | NR national record | OR Olympic record | PB personal best | SB season best | WL world leading (in a given season)

Women
Event	Gold		Silver		Bronze	
Shot put	Nadzeya Astapchuk (BLR)	20.16 m	Natallia Mikhnevich (BLR)	19.55 m	Anca Heltne (ROM)	19.11 m PB
Discus throw	Nadine Müller (GER)	64.30 m PB	Żaneta Glanc (POL)	59.95 m	Nicoleta Grasu (ROM)	59.92 m
Hammer throw	Betty Heidler (GER)	72.48 m	Silvia Salis (ITA)	69.43 m	Tatyana Lysenko (RUS)	69.11 m
Javelin throw	Martina Ratej (SLO)	65.96 m NR	Mariya Abakumova (RUS)	65.21 m	Linda Stahl (GER)	60.56 m
WR world record | AR area record | CR championship record | GR games record | NR national record | OR Olympic record | PB personal best | SB season best | WL world leading (in a given season)

=== Under-23 ===
Under-23 men
Event	Gold		Silver		Bronze	
Shot put	Konstantin Lyadusov (RUS)	18.88 m PB	Siarhei Bakhar (BLR)	17.65 m	Stanislav Seheda (UKR)	17.49 m
Discus throw	Ivan Hryshyn (UKR)	63.09 m PB	Marin Premeru (CRO)	62.10 m PB	Gordon Wolf (GER)	61.00 m PB
Hammer throw	Javier Cienfuegos (ESP)	71.60 m	Andriy Martynyuk (UKR)	70.54 m	Aleksey Kochnev (RUS)	70.45 m PB
Javelin throw	Thomas Smet (BEL)	76.67 m	Roman Avramenko (UKR)	75.82 m	Lars Hamann (GER)	74.72 m PB

Under 23 women
Event	Gold		Silver		Bronze	
Shot put	Aliona Hryshko (BLR)	17.66 m	Melissa Boekelman (NED)	17.56 m	Anita Márton (HUN)	17.34 m
Discus throw	Sandra Perković (CRO)	61.93 m	Irina Rodrigues (POR)	55.29 m	Nastassia Kashtanava (BLR)	54.65 m
Hammer throw	Zalina Marghieva (MDA)	70.77 m	Jenny Ozorai (HUN)	63.03 m	Barbara Špiler (SLO)	62.99 m
Javelin throw	Vira Rebryk (UKR)	59.55 m	Tatjana Jelača (SRB)	56.26 m	Sanni Utriainen (FIN)	54.80 m PB
