= 2008 World Junior Championships in Athletics – Women's javelin throw =

The women's javelin throw event at the 2008 World Junior Championships in Athletics was held in Bydgoszcz, Poland, at Zawisza Stadium on 8 and 10 July.

== Medalists ==
Gold	Vira Rebryk; Ukraine
Silver	Li Lingwei; China
Bronze	Tatjana Jelača; Serbia

== Results ==
=== Final ===
10 July

Rank	Name	Nationality	Attempts						Result	Notes
Rank	Name	Nationality	1	2	3	4	5	6	Result	Notes
1st place, gold medalist(s)	Vira Rebryk	Ukraine	55.38	63.01	-	x	-	59.60	63.01	
2nd place, silver medalist(s)	Li Lingwei	China	53.08	x	52.56	55.92	59.25	55.17	59.25	
3rd place, bronze medalist(s)	Tatjana Jelača	Serbia	48.45	x	52.92	52.17	58.77	55.34	58.77	
4	Zhang Li	China	53.09	51.81	56.68	55.49	53.60	54.39	56.68	
5	Tazmin Brits	South Africa	55.34	54.07	51.38	54.98	x	56.12	56.12	
6	Jelena Jaakkola	Finland	50.39	55.26	x	x	x	x	55.26	
7	Anna Wessman	Sweden	48.86	51.44	51.58	-	49.51	54.12	54.12	
8	Nikola Ogrodníková	Czech Republic	53.94	48.66	-	-	-	-	53.94	
9	Anastasiya Svechnikova	Uzbekistan	x	51.15	x				51.15	
10	Janis Ramírez	Nicaragua	x	51.12	x				51.12	
11	Jucilene de Lima	Brazil	50.87	49.20	x				50.87	
12	Ina Kartum	Norway	45.63	48.39	46.83				48.39	

=== Qualifications ===
8 July

==== Group A ====
Rank	Name	Nationality	Attempts			Result	Notes
Rank	Name	Nationality	1	2	3	Result	Notes
1	Nikola Ogrodníková	Czech Republic	46.93	54.48	-	54.48	Q
2	Tatjana Jelača	Serbia	46.94	49.61	52.05	52.05	q
3	Tazmin Brits	South Africa	43.27	51.69	48.44	51.69	q
4	Zhang Li	China	50.32	51.38	50.20	51.38	q
5	Anna Wessman	Sweden	x	51.38	47.61	51.38	q
6	Karolina Mor	Poland	49.79	40.81	50.53	50.53	
7	Karlee McQuillen	United States	49.77	x	49.67	49.77	
8	Kate Shierlaw	Australia	47.53	45.86	47.98	47.98	
9	Oona Sormunen	Finland	x	x	46.32	46.32	
10	María Paz Ríos	Chile	40.41	44.89	42.64	44.89	
11	Eliza Toader	Romania	41.29	41.96	44.41	44.41	
12	Chiu Pei-Lien	Chinese Taipei	44.06	x	37.87	44.06	
13	Ziva Klarer Rebec	Slovenia	x	41.77	43.95	43.95	
14	Kateryna Retiva	Ukraine	39.76	42.95	40.58	42.95	

==== Group B ====
Rank	Name	Nationality	Attempts			Result	Notes
Rank	Name	Nationality	1	2	3	Result	Notes
1	Vira Rebryk	Ukraine	58.66	-	-	58.66	Q
2	Jelena Jaakkola	Finland	46.43	x	54.30	54.30	Q
3	Li Lingwei	China	50.94	52.90	50.39	52.90	q
4	Jucilene de Lima	Brazil	51.55	48.49	43.53	51.55	q
5	Janis Ramírez	Nicaragua	51.43	45.65	x	51.43	q
6	Anastasiya Svechnikova	Uzbekistan	x	51.17	46.31	51.17	q
7	Ina Kartum	Norway	45.21	50.98	x	50.98	q
8	Matilde Andraud	France	48.76	49.00	45.90	49.00	
9	Tatsiana Khaladovich	Belarus	x	48.33	44.10	48.33	
10	Valentina Croitori	Moldova	46.87	46.69	41.01	46.87	
11	Barbora Svozilová	Czech Republic	45.96	46.00	x	46.00	
12	Aleksandra Erkic	Slovenia	45.77	45.37	x	45.77	
13	Sarah Nöh	Germany	45.73	x	43.24	45.73	
14	Laura Macauley	Canada	37.35	40.11	43.45	43.45	

== Participation ==
According to an unofficial count, 28 athletes from 23 countries participated in the event.

- Australia (1)
- Belarus (1)
- Brazil (1)
- Canada (1)
- Chile (1)
- China (2)
- Chinese Taipei (1)
- Czech Republic (2)
- Finland (2)
- France (1)
- Germany (1)
- Moldova (1)
- Nicaragua (1)
- Norway (1)
- Poland (1)
- Romania (1)
- Serbia (1)
- Slovenia (2)
- South Africa (1)
- Sweden (1)
- Ukraine (2)
- United States (1)
- Uzbekistan (1)
