= Sinta Ozoliņa-Kovala =

Latvian javelin thrower (born 1988)

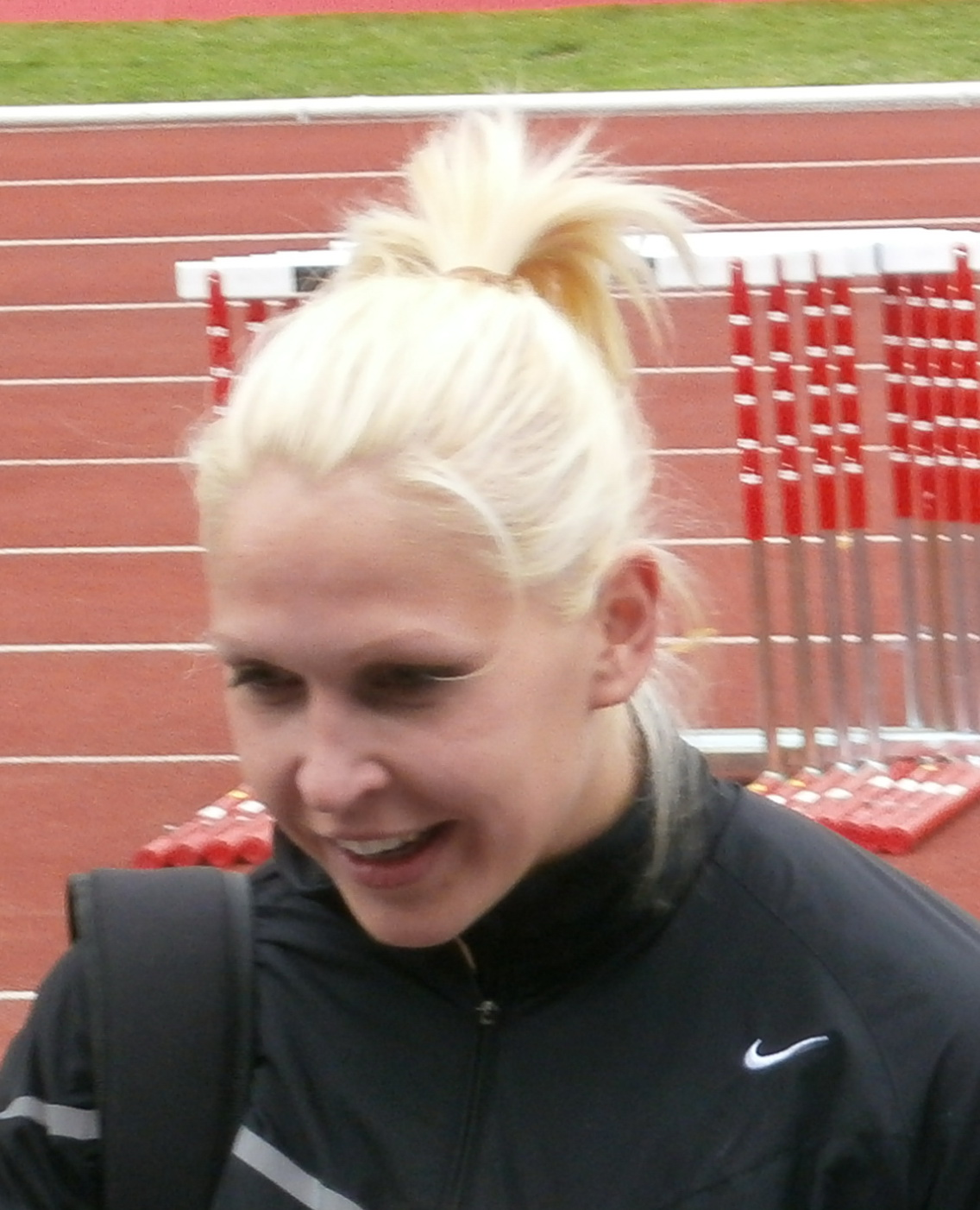
- Sinta Ozoliņa-Kovala in 2012

Personal information
- Born: 26 February 1988 (age 38) Riga, Latvian SSR, Soviet Union
- Height: 1.86 m (6 ft 1 in)
- Weight: 78 kg (172 lb)

Sport
- Country: Latvia
- Sport: Athletics
- Event: Javelin
- Updated on 11 August 2012

Sinta Ozoliņa-Kovala (born 26 February 1988) is a Latvian javelin thrower. She was the 2007 European Junior silver medalist. She competed for Latvia at the 2008, 2012 and 2016 Olympic Games.

== Career ==
Ozoliņa-Kovala was one of many Latvian javelin throwers coached by Valentīna Eiduka. In 2006, she competed at the World Junior Championships, reached the final and finished in sixth place. She won the silver medal at the 2007 European Junior Championships, finishing second only to Ukraine's Vira Rebryk.

In 2008, Ozoliņa-Kovala made her first appearance at the Summer Olympics. During the javelin throw qualification, she set a new Latvian record in javelin throw – 60.13m. This result also gave her a spot in the final, as that result was the twelfth best on the night. Two days later, in the final, Ozoliņa's best throw was 53.38m and she finished in tenth place.

She competed at the 2010 European Athletics Championships in Barcelona, Spain, but did not reach the final.

She had a sixth place finish at the 2012 European Athletics Championships in Helsinki, Finland, with a best throw of 58.34 metres. Competing at the 2012 London Olympics, Ozoliņa-Kovala had her best throw in the second round of 58.86 meters. Ozoliņa-Kovala ranked 11th in her group and 20th in the overall standings of the qualification competition, which was not enough to qualify for the final.

In 2013, Ozoliņa-Kovala won the International Association of Athletics Federations (IAAF) Challenge Series in Beijing. She won with a throw of 60.90 meters, 64 centimetres ahead of second-place finisher Maria Abakumova of Russia. In early May of that year she placed fourth at the previous Challenge Series competition in Tokyo with a throw of 59.25 metres. She threw a personal best distance of 64.38 metres in Riga in 2013, 13 centimetres behind the Latvian record set by Madara Palameika.

Competing in Zurich, Switzerland, she had an eleventh place finish at the 2014 European Athletics Championships with a best throw of 57.82 metres.

She had a seventh place finish at the 2025 World Athletics Championships in Beijing where she threw 62.20 metres.

She competed at the 2016 European Athletics Championships in Amsterdam, Netherlands, but did not qualify for the final. She competed at her third Olympic Games at the 2016 Summer Games in Rio de Janeiro, but did not qualify for the final.

== Personal life ==
She married Dainis Sprudzāns in Kuldīga in the week after she competed at the 2016 Rio Olympics. After the wedding, the athlete took her husband's surname.

== Achievements ==
|-

Year	Competition	Venue	Position	Notes
2005	World Youth Championships	Marrakesh, Morocco	25th (q)	39.34 m
2006	World Junior Championships	Beijing, China	6th	56.38 m
2007	European Junior Championships	Hengelo, Netherlands	2nd	57.01 m
2008	Olympic Games	Beijing, China	11th	53.38 m
2009	European U23 Championships	Kaunas, Lithuania	9th	52.20 m
2010	European Championships	Barcelona, Spain	13th (q)	56.11 m
2011	World Championships	Daegu, South Korea	18th (q)	58.15 m
2012	European Championships	Helsinki, Finland	6th	59.34 m
2012	Olympic Games	London, United Kingdom	20th (q)	58.86 m
2014	European Championships	Zürich, Switzerland	11th	57.82 m
2015	World Championships	Beijing, China	7th	62.20 m
2016	European Championships	Amsterdam, Netherlands	14th (q)	57.58 m
2016	Olympic Games	Rio de Janeiro, Brazil	14th (q)	60.92 m

== Personal bests ==
Event	Mark	Venue	Year
Javelin	60.13 m	Beijing, China	2008

Awards
Preceded by Aiga Grabuste	Latvian Rising Sportspersonality of the Year; 2008	Succeeded by Anastasija Sevastova
