= 2012 European Athletics Championships – Women's javelin throw =

Women's javelin throw at the European Athletics Championships

The women's javelin throw at the 2012 European Athletics Championships was held at the Helsinki Olympic Stadium Finland on 27 and 29 June.

== Medalists ==
Gold	Vira Rebryk; Ukraine
Silver	Christina Obergföll; Germany
Bronze	Linda Stahl; Germany

== Records ==
Standing records prior to the 2012 European Athletics Championships
World record	Barbora Špotáková (CZE)	72.28	Stuttgart, Germany	13 September 2008
European record	Barbora Špotáková (CZE)	72.28	Stuttgart, Germany	13 September 2008
Championship record	Mirela Manjani (GRE)	67.47	Munich, Germany	8 August 2002
World Leading	Sunette Viljoen (RSA)	69.35	New York City, United States	9 June 2012
European Leading	Barbora Špotáková (CZE)	68.73	New York City, United States	9 June 2012

== Schedule ==
Date	Time	Round
27 June 2012	13:45	Qualification
29 June 2012	19:30	Final

== Results ==
=== Qualification ===
Qualification: Qualification Performance 60.00 (Q) or at least 12 best performers advance to the final

Rank	Group	Athlete	Nationality	#1	#2	#3	Result	Notes
1	A	Vira Rebryk	Ukraine	61.84			61.84	Q
2	B	Goldie Sayers	Great Britain	58.02	60.90		60.90	Q
3	B	Linda Stahl	Germany	56.50	57.59	59.65	59.65	q
4	B	Christina Obergföll	Germany	58.92	59.49	x	59.49	q
5	B	Sinta Ozoliņa-Kovala	Latvia	53.39	55.44	59.41	59.41	q
6	B	Sanni Utriainen	Finland	57.52	x	58.70	58.70	q
7	A	Katharina Molitor	Germany	54.49	58.34	x	58.34	q
8	A	Savva Lika	Greece	53.50	57.60	x	57.60	q
9	B	Līna Mūze	Latvia	57.51	x	53.83	57.51	q
10	B	Tatjana Jelača	Serbia	57.29	x	52.55	57.29	q, SB
11	A	Madara Palameika	Latvia	55.85	57.24	55.47	57.24	q
12	A	Zahra Bani	Italy	55.42	56.67	54.67	56.67	q
13	B	Ásdís Hjálmsdóttir	Iceland	55.29	52.25	54.54	55.29	
14	A	Oona Sormunen	Finland	x	52.13	54.66	54.66	
15	A	Indrė Jakubaitytė	Lithuania	x	54.39	x	54.39	
16	B	Nora Bicet	Spain	53.61	x	53.80	53.80	
17	B	Vanda Juhász	Hungary	53.65	49.15	x	53.65	
18	A	Raine Kuningas	Estonia	45.93	53.65	x	53.65	
19	A	Laura Whittingham	Great Britain	52.82	x	50.70	52.82	
20	B	Maria Negoita	Romania	51.02	51.96	48.07	51.96	
21	A	Martina Ratej	Slovenia	51.69	50.77	x	51.69	
22	A	Xénia Nagy	Hungary	51.63	50.65	47.84	51.63	
23	A	Kristine Harutyunyan	Armenia	44.05	45.48	45.83	45.83	

=== Final ===
Rank	Athlete	Nationality	#1	#2	#3	#4	#5	#6	Result	Notes
1st place, gold medalist(s)	Vira Rebryk	Ukraine	57.04	63.44	x	62.83	66.86	64.77	66.86	NR
2nd place, silver medalist(s)	Christina Obergföll	Germany	65.12	x	63.53	64.55	x	63.17	65.12	
3rd place, bronze medalist(s)	Linda Stahl	Germany	63.69	63.47	58.53	59.29	x	60.76	63.69	
4	Goldie Sayers	Great Britain	x	63.01	60.34	x	62.19	x	63.01	
5	Katharina Molitor	Germany	59.85	60.99	x	59.59	x	58.89	60.99	
6	Sinta Ozoliņa-Kovala	Latvia	59.34	x	55.92	x	x	59.24	59.34	
7	Tatjana Jelača	Serbia	54.22	53.43	57.58	51.88	54.40	53.32	57.58	SB
8	Madara Palameika	Latvia	x	50.21	56.82	x	55.21	x	56.82	
9	Savva Lika	Greece	53.84	54.83	56.25				56.25	
10	Līna Mūze	Latvia	51.42	55.60	53.97				55.60	
11	Sanni Utriainen	Finland	52.57	53.79	55.14				55.14	
12	Zahra Bani	Italy	53.40	53.05	53.33				53.40	
