= Elisabeth Eberl =

Austrian javelin thrower

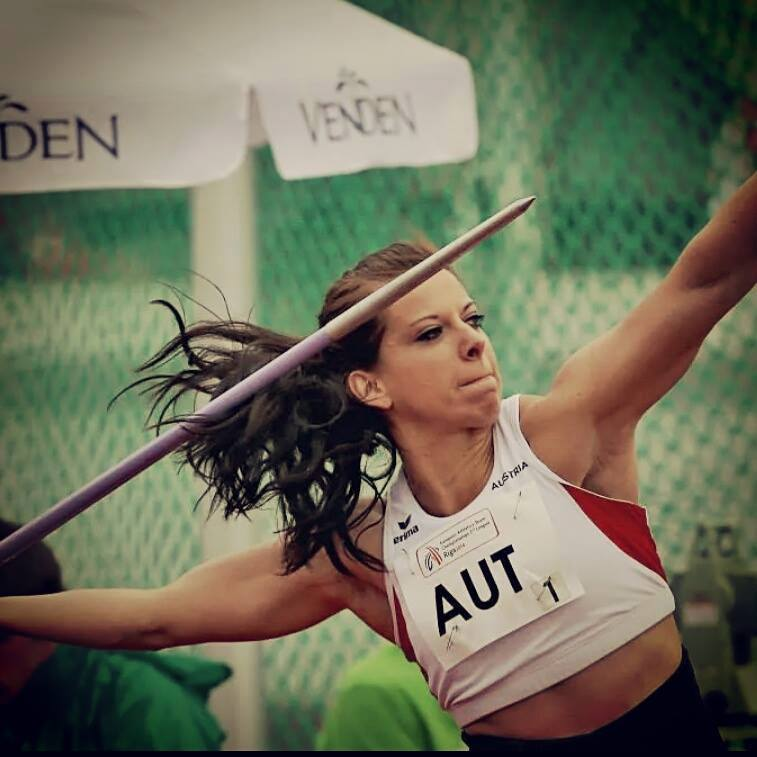
- Elisabeth Eberl at the European Team Championships in Riga, Latvia 2014

Personal information
- Born: 25 March 1988 (age 38) Graz, Austria
- Height: 1.70 m (5 ft 7 in)
- Weight: 65 kg (143 lb)

Sport
- Country: Austria
- Sport: Athletics
- Event: Javelin
Medal record
Women's athletics
Representing Austria
European Games
Silver medal – second place	2015 Baku	Mixed team
- Updated on 12 August 2012

Elisabeth Eberl (born 25 March 1988) is an Austrian javelin thrower. She competed in the javelin throw event at the 2012 Summer Olympics.

== Achievements ==
Year	Competition	Venue	Position	Event	Notes
Representing Austria
2005	World Youth Championships	Marrakesh, Morocco	15th (q)	Javelin throw	44.47 m
2007	European Junior Championships	Hengelo, Netherlands	13th (q)	Javelin throw	47.46 m
2009	European Cup Winter Throwing (U23)	Tenerife, Spain	2nd	Javelin throw	54.31 m
2009	European U23 Championships	Kaunas, Lithuania	12th	Javelin throw	50.52 m
2009	Universiade	Belgrade, Serbia	11th	Javelin throw	52.35 m
2011	World Championships	Daegu, South Korea	25th (q)	Javelin throw	56.48 m
2012	Olympic Games	London, United Kingdom	37th (q)	Javelin throw	49.66 m
2013	Universiade	Kazan, Russia	3rd	Javelin throw	55.02 m
2014	European Championships	Zurich, Switzerland	17th (q)	Javelin throw	54.41 m
