= 2014 European Athletics Championships – Women's javelin throw =

Women's javelin throw at the European Athletics Championships

The women's javelin throw at the 2014 European Athletics Championships took place at the Letzigrund on 12 and 14 August.

== Medalists ==
Gold	Barbora Špotáková; Czech Republic
Silver	Tatjana Jelača; Serbia
Bronze	Linda Stahl; Germany

== Records ==
Standing records prior to the 2014 European Athletics Championships
World record	Barbora Špotáková (CZE)	72.28 m	Stuttgart, Germany	13 September 2008
European record	Barbora Špotáková (CZE)	72.28 m	Stuttgart, Germany	13 September 2008
Championship record	Mirela Manjani (GRE)	67.47 m	Munich, Germany	8 August 2002
World Leading	Linda Stahl (GER)	67.32 m	New York City, United States	14 June 2014
European Leading	Linda Stahl (GER)	67.32 m	New York City, United States	14 June 2014

== Schedule ==
Date	Time	Round
12 August 2014	10:50	Qualification
14 August 2014	20:40	Final

All times are local times (UTC+2)

== Results ==
=== Qualification ===
57.50 (Q) or at least 12 best performers (q) advanced to the Final.

Rank	Group	Name	Nationality	#1	#2	#3	Mark	Note
1	B	Martina Ratej	Slovenia	61.87			61.87	Q
2	B	Christin Hussong	Germany	57.47	61.13		61.13	Q
3	A	Tatjana Jelača	Serbia	60.26			60.26	Q
4	A	Barbora Špotáková	Czech Republic	59.99			59.99	Q
5	A	Tatsiana Khaladovich	Belarus	56.29	54.60	59.51	59.51	Q
6	A	Sinta Ozoliņa-Kovala	Latvia	59.47			59.47	Q
7	B	Linda Stahl	Germany	59.42			59.42	Q
8	A	Katharina Molitor	Germany	56.61	57.05	58.24	58.24	Q
9	B	Goldie Sayers	Great Britain	58.07			58.07	Q
10	B	Madara Palameika	Latvia	57.86			57.86	Q
11	B	Mercedes Chilla	Spain	57.82			57.82	Q
12	B	Sofi Flink	Sweden	57.21	55.21	57.53	57.53	Q
13	B	Ásdís Hjálmsdóttir	Iceland	55.81	56.36	54.44	56.36	
14	B	Petra Andrejsková	Czech Republic	53.23	56.10	55.43	56.10	
15	A	Indrė Jakubaitytė	Lithuania	54.86	53.37	52.57	54.86	
16	B	Marie-Therese Obst	Norway	54.59	52.42	x	54.59	
17	A	Elisabeth Eberl	Austria	52.92	51.19	54.41	54.41	
18	A	Hanna Hatsko-Fedusova	Ukraine	53.81	x	x	53.81	
19	B	Līna Mūze	Latvia	53.42	53.11	x	53.42	
20	A	Nikola Ogrodníková	Czech Republic	x	x	53.15	53.15	
21	A	Sara Kolak	Croatia	x	52.51	51.84	52.51	
22	A	Oona Sormunen	Finland	51.46	x	x	51.46	

=== Final ===
Rank	Name	Nationality	#1	#2	#3	#4	#5	#6	Result	Notes
1st place, gold medalist(s)	Barbora Špotáková	Czech Republic	62.86	59.67	58.83	57.24	64.41	61.59	64.41	
2nd place, silver medalist(s)	Tatjana Jelača	Serbia	60.98	60.51	62.31	60.25	64.21	60.30	64.21	NR
3rd place, bronze medalist(s)	Linda Stahl	Germany	63.91	60.09	62.70	63.06	61.61	x	63.91	
4	Madara Palameika	Latvia	60.33	62.04	x	x	x	60.31	62.04	
5	Tatsiana Khaladovich	Belarus	59.60	56.64	60.91	x	61.41	61.66	61.66	
6	Martina Ratej	Slovenia	58.00	61.58	60.78	59.45	61.58	56.84	61.58	
7	Christin Hussong	Germany	59.05	55.96	59.02	59.29	57.49	59.08	59.29	
8	Goldie Sayers	Great Britain	55.81	x	58.33	x	x	x	58.33	
9	Katharina Molitor	Germany	50.65	58.00	56.04				58.00	
10	Mercedes Chilla	Spain	57.91	52.66	54.23				57.91	
11	Sinta Ozoliņa-Kovala	Latvia	57.82	x	x				57.82	
12	Sofi Flink	Sweden	56.68	54.23	54.66				56.68	
