= Athletics at the 2009 Summer Universiade – Women's javelin throw =

The women's javelin throw event at the 2009 Summer Universiade was held on 7–9 July.

== Medalists ==
| Gold | Silver | Bronze |
|---|---|---|
| Sunette Viljoen; South Africa | Vira Rebryk; Ukraine | Mareike Rittweg; Germany |

== Results ==
=== Qualification ===
Qualification: 59.00 m (Q) or at least 12 best (q) qualified for the final.

| Rank | Group | Athlete | Nationality | #1 | #2 | #3 | Result | Notes |
|---|---|---|---|---|---|---|---|---|
| 1 | B | Sunette Viljoen | South Africa | 65.43 | | | 65.43 | Q |
| 2 | A | Vira Rebryk | Ukraine | 59.36 | | | 59.36 | Q |
| 3 | B | Mareike Rittweg | Germany | x | x | 58.62 | 58.62 | q |
| 4 | B | Maria Nicoleta Negoiţă | Romania | 58.40 | – | – | 58.40 | q |
| 5 | A | Elisabeth Pauer | Austria | 54.87 | 52.66 | 58.19 | 58.19 | q |
| 6 | B | Laura Cornford | Australia | 56.38 | 53.44 | 54.39 | 56.38 | q |
| 7 | B | Gim Gyeong-ae | South Korea | 53.13 | 46.56 | 55.48 | 55.48 | q, SB |
| 8 | A | Katharina Molitor | Germany | 54.87 | 55.15 | x | 55.15 | q |
| 9 | A | Elizabeth Gleadle | Canada | 46.35 | 48.89 | 53.58 | 53.58 | q |
| 10 | B | Zhang Feng | China | 49.77 | 52.15 | 51.90 | 52.15 | q |
| 11 | B | Melissa Dupré | Belgium | 47.87 | x | 51.72 | 51.72 | q |
| 12 | B | Elisabeth Eberl | Austria | 50.40 | 49.64 | 51.19 | 51.19 | q |
| 13 | B | Yulia Pelikh | Russia | 49.16 | 47.25 | 46.61 | 49.16 | |
| 14 | A | Leryn Franco | Paraguay | x | x | 48.26 | 48.26 | |
| 15 | A | Lucy Okumu Aber | Uganda | x | 41.11 | 46.37 | 46.37 | SB |
| 16 | A | Jelena Cudanov | Serbia | x | 39.49 | 46.12 | 46.12 | |
| 17 | A | Nahomi Rivera | Puerto Rico | x | x | 43.98 | 43.98 | |
| 18 | B | Joyce Apio | Uganda | x | x | 29.36 | 29.36 | |

=== Final ===
| Rank | Athlete | Nationality | #1 | #2 | #3 | #4 | #5 | #6 | Result | Notes |
|---|---|---|---|---|---|---|---|---|---|---|
| 1st place, gold medalist(s) | Sunette Viljoen | South Africa | 62.25 | x | 60.96 | 60.07 | 60.19 | 62.52 | 62.52 | |
| 2nd place, silver medalist(s) | Vira Rebryk | Ukraine | 62.25 | 60.96 | x | 60.07 | 60.19 | 62.52 | 62.52 | |
| 3rd place, bronze medalist(s) | Mareike Rittweg | Germany | 59.44 | 57.89 | x | x | x | x | 59.44 | |
| 4 | Katharina Molitor | Germany | x | 57.10 | 59.41 | 56.78 | 57.42 | 56.86 | 59.41 | |
| 5 | Maria Nicoleta Negoiţă | Romania | 58.15 | 59.37 | x | 55.86 | 53.10 | 56.75 | 59.37 | |
| 6 | Elizabeth Gleadle | Canada | 58.21 | 55.93 | 56.45 | 55.25 | 51.24 | x | 58.21 | PB |
| 7 | Laura Cornford | Australia | 55.98 | x | x | 55.98 | 55.31 | 52.79 | 55.98 | |
| 8 | Zhang Feng | China | 51.07 | 55.22 | 53.92 | 51.44 | 49.52 | 48.72 | 55.22 | PB |
| 9 | Gim Gyeong-ae | South Korea | 50.81 | x | 54.40 | | | | 54.40 | |
| 10 | Elisabeth Pauer | Austria | x | 52.99 | 53.94 | | | | 53.94 | |
| 11 | Elisabeth Eberl | Austria | 50.58 | 50.92 | 52.35 | | | | 52.35 | |
| 12 | Melissa Dupré | Belgium | 46.99 | 49.46 | 50.48 | | | | 50.48 | |
