= Anna Wessman =

Swedish javelin thrower

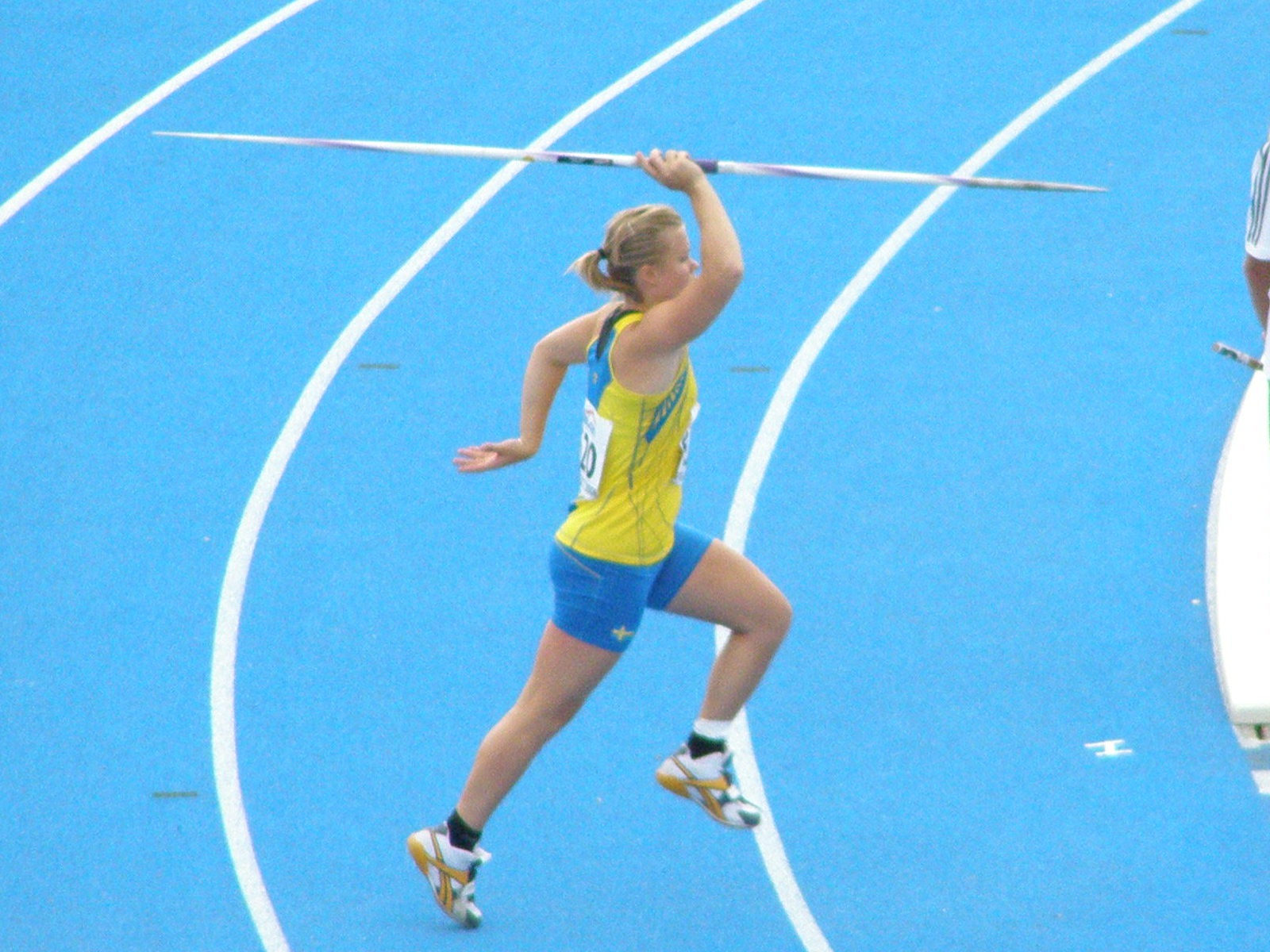
- Anna Wessman at the 2008 World Junior Championships

Personal information
- Born: 9 October 1989 (age 36) Växjö, Sweden
- Education: University of Texas; Linnaeus University
- Height: 1.64 m (5 ft 5 in)
- Weight: 70 kg (154 lb)

Sport
- Sport: Track and field
- Event: Javelin throw

Anna Wessman (born 9 October 1989) is a Swedish track and field athlete who competes in the javelin throw. She won the bronze medal at the 2009 European U23 Championships.

Her personal best in the event is 61.42 metres set at Finnkampen in Tampere in 2016.

Wessman was an All-American thrower for the UTEP Miners track and field team, finishing 3rd in the javelin at the 2009 NCAA Division I Outdoor Track and Field Championships.

== International competitions ==
Year	Competition	Venue	Position	Event	Notes
Representing Sweden
2007	European Junior Championships	Hengelo, Netherlands	6th	Javelin throw	50.72 m
2008	World Junior Championships	Bydgoszcz, Poland	7th	Javelin throw	54.12 m
2009	European U23 Championships	Kaunas, Lithuania	3rd	Javelin throw	55.91 m
2011	European U23 Championships	Ostrava, Czech Republic	6th	Javelin throw	55.50 m
2015	Universiade	Gwangju, South Korea	4th	Javelin throw	58.34 m
2016	European Championships	Amsterdam, Netherlands	24th (q)	Javelin throw	54.02 m
