= Athletics at the 2012 Summer Olympics – Women's javelin throw =

Women's javelin throw at the Games of the XXX Olympiad
- Venue: Olympic Stadium
- Date: 7–9 August
- Competitors: 42 from 29 nations
- Winning distance: 69.55

Medalists
1st place, gold medalist(s)		Barbora Špotáková	Czech Republic
2nd place, silver medalist(s)		Christina Obergföll	Germany
3rd place, bronze medalist(s)		Linda Stahl	Germany

Official Video Highlights

The Women's javelin throw competition at the 2012 Summer Olympics in London, United Kingdom. The event was held at the Olympic Stadium on 7–9 August. Each athlete receives three throws in the qualifying round. All who achieve the qualifying distance progress to the final. If less than twelve athletes achieve this mark, then the twelve furthest throwing athletes reach the final. Each finalist is allowed three throws in last round, with the top eight athletes after that point being given three further attempts.

The qualifying round was mostly automatic marks. Eight athletes hit the auto mark in their first legal attempt. It took 60.11 to make the final.

The final was dominated by defending champion and world record holder Barbora Špotáková who took the lead on the first throw of the competition, a lead she would never relinquish. On the second throw of the competition Sunette Viljoen got off her best throw, which would put her in third place. Later in the round, Christina Obergföll got off her only legal throw, which turned out to be the silver medal throw. Each round Špotáková kept putting out long throws, but didn't improve. In the fourth round, Linda Stahl passed Viljoen to move into bronze medal position. Then Špotáková let loose the winner, her 69.55—more than 2.5 metres further than her previous bests—which won the competition by 4.39 metres. None of the medalists even got a legal throw in the final two rounds. Any one of Špotáková's four legal throws would have won the gold medal.

== Schedule ==
All times are British Summer Time (UTC+1)

Date	Time	Round
Tuesday, 7 August 2012	10:00	Qualifications
Thursday, 9 August 2012	21:00	Finals

== Records ==
Prior to the competition, the existing world record, Olympic record, and world leading mark were as follows:

World record	Barbora Špotáková (CZE)	72.28 m	Stuttgart, Germany	13 September 2008
Olympic record	Osleidys Menéndez (CUB)	71.53 m	Athens, Greece	27 August 2004
2012 World leading	Sunette Viljoen (RSA)	69.35 m	New York City, United States	9 June 2012

== Results ==
=== Qualifying round ===
Qual. rule: qualification standard 62.00m (Q) or at least best 12 qualified (q).

Rank	Group	Name	Nationality	#1	#2	#3	Result	Notes
1	A	Barbora Špotáková	Czech Republic	66.19	–	–	66.19	Q
2	A	Christina Obergföll	Germany	66.14	–	–	66.14	Q
3	B	Sunette Viljoen	South Africa	65.92	–	–	65.92	Q
4	A	Linda Stahl	Germany	64.78	–	–	64.78	Q SB
5	B	Lü Huihui	China	64.45	–	–	64.45	Q
DSQ	A	Martina Ratej	Slovenia	x	63.60	–	63.60	Q
DSQ	B	Maria Abakumova	Russia	63.25	–	–	63.25	Q
8	B	Ásdís Hjálmsdóttir	Iceland	62.77	–	–	62.77	Q NR
9	B	Katharina Molitor	Germany	58.06	55.30	62.05	62.05	Q
10	A	Madara Palameika	Latvia	60.62	60.50	57.91	60.62	q
11	A	Elizabeth Gleadle	Canada	x	59.73	60.26	60.26	q
12	B	Kathryn Mitchell	Australia	60.11	57.80	59.84	60.11	q
13	A	Līna Mūze	Latvia	51.15	59.48	59.91	59.91	
14	B	Jarmila Klimešová	Czech Republic	56.76	59.90	x	59.90	
15	A	Brittany Borman	United States	54.31	56.50	59.27	59.27	
16	B	Yuki Ebihara	Japan	59.25	58.03	54.17	59.25	
17	A	Kimberley Mickle	Australia	59.23	57.77	x	59.23	
18	B	Indre Jakubaityte	Lithuania	54.05	56.63	59.05	59.05	SB
19	B	Vera Rebrik	Ukraine	x	58.97	x	58.97	
20	B	Sinta Ozoliņa-Kovala	Latvia	x	58.86	51.35	58.86	
21	A	Laila Ferrer e Silva	Brazil	51.66	52.61	58.39	58.39	
22	B	Hanna Hatsko	Ukraine	58.37	56.02	55.94	58.37	
23	A	Zhang Li	China	57.17	58.35	x	58.35	
24	B	Rachel Yurkovich	United States	54.20	x	57.92	57.92	
25	A	Noraida Bicet	Spain	54.08	54.56	57.77	57.77	
26	A	Tatjana Jelača	Serbia	52.58	x	57.09	57.09	
27	B	Sávva Líka	Greece	56.36	57.06	x	57.06	
28	A	Marharyta Dorozhon	Ukraine	56.74	55.18	50.60	56.74	
29	B	Yainelis Ribeaux	Cuba	53.70	56.55	x	56.55	
30	B	Li Lingwei	China	55.28	x	56.50	56.50	
31	A	Kara Patterson	United States	56.23	x	x	56.23	
32	A	Flor Ruiz	Colombia	x	54.34	52.37	54.34	
33	B	Maryna Novik	Belarus	51.93	50.77	54.31	54.31	
34	B	Leryn Franco	Paraguay	51.45	x	49.72	51.45	
35	B	Anastasiya Svechnikova	Uzbekistan	50.56	51.27	x	51.27	
36	B	Vanda Juhász	Hungary	49.90	50.01	x	50.01	
37	A	Elisabeth Eberl	Austria	x	x	49.66	49.66	
38	A	Kristine Harutyunyan	Armenia	47.65	x	x	47.65	
—N/a	A	Yanet Cruz	Cuba	x	x	x	—N/a	NM
—N/a	A	Goldie Sayers	Great Britain	x	x	x	—N/a	NM
—N/a	B	Sanni Utriainen	Finland	x	x	x	—N/a	NM
—N/a	A	Yusbelys Parra	Venezuela	—N/a	—N/a	—N/a	—N/a	DNS

=== Final ===
Rank	Name	Nationality	#1	#2	#3	#4	#5	#6	Result	Notes
1st place, gold medalist(s)	Barbora Špotáková	Czech Republic	66.90	66.88	66.24	69.55	x	x	69.55	WL
2nd place, silver medalist(s)	Christina Obergföll	Germany	65.16	x	x	x	x	x	65.16	
3rd place, bronze medalist(s)	Linda Stahl	Germany	59.49	63.24	62.67	64.91	x	x	64.91	SB
4	Sunette Viljoen	South Africa	64.53	62.71	57.30	57.05	60.93	62.61	64.53	
5	Lü Huihui	China	59.97	63.28	58.58	61.26	63.70	62.19	63.70	
6	Katharina Molitor	Germany	62.89	58.15	58.51	x	x	x	62.89	
DSQ	Martina Ratej	Slovenia	x	58.89	61.62	x	60.11	56.90	61.62	
7	Madara Palameika	Latvia	56.47	60.73	x	59.32	x	59.22	60.73	
8	Kathryn Mitchell	Australia	58.31	59.46	58.45	–	–	–	59.46	
DSQ	Maria Abakumova	Russia	x	59.34	58.70	–	–	–	59.34	
9	Ásdís Hjálmsdóttir	Iceland	59.08	57.35	x	–	–	–	59.08	
10	Elizabeth Gleadle	Canada	57.10	x	58.78	–	–	–	58.78	
