= 2007 European Athletics U23 Championships – Women's javelin throw =

The women's javelin throw event at the 2007 European Athletics U23 Championships was held in Debrecen, Hungary, at Gyulai István Atlétikai Stadion on the 14 and 15 July.

== Medalists ==
Gold	Linda Stahl; Germany
Silver	Annika Suthe; Germany
Bronze	Madara Palameika; Latvia

== Results ==
=== Final ===
15 July

Rank	Name	Nationality	Attempts						Result	Notes
Rank	Name	Nationality	1	2	3	4	5	6	Result	Notes
1st place, gold medalist(s)	Linda Stahl	Germany	62.17	55.91	x	59.40	61.94	62.07	62.17	CR
2nd place, silver medalist(s)	Annika Suthe	Germany	50.71	57.03	54.67	x	55.10	57.86	57.86	
3rd place, bronze medalist(s)	Madara Palameika	Latvia	49.10	57.07	53.00	x	x	55.29	57.07	
4	Maria Negoiță	Romania	x	50.28	52.32	56.10	51.36	51.08	56.10	
5	Bregje Crolla	Netherlands	53.15	49.09	54.65	46.86	–	–	54.65	
6	Mariya Abakumova	Russia	54.25	x	x	53.50	53.84	x	54.25	
7	Sofia Ifantidou	Greece	50.10	52.18	52.23	52.25	x	50.92	52.25	
8	Franziska Krebs	Germany	47.94	49.05	50.98	x	x	x	50.98	
9	Xénia Nagy	Hungary	50.28	48.24	48.54				50.28	
10	Maryna Buksa	Belarus	50.11	47.69	47.78				50.11	
11	Doriane Gilibert	France	49.11	x	48.07				49.11	
12	Marisela Silva	Portugal	45.54	x	47.32				47.32	

=== Qualifications ===
14 July
Qualifying 52.50 or 12 best to the Final

Rank	Name	Nationality	Result	Notes
1	Annika Suthe	Germany	55.03	Q
2	Linda Stahl	Germany	54.45	Q
3	Madara Palameika	Latvia	53.34	Q
4	Maryna Buksa	Belarus	52.91	Q
5	Mariya Abakumova	Russia	51.59	q
6	Sofia Ifantidou	Greece	50.86	q
7	Maria Negoiță	Romania	50.35	q
8	Xénia Nagy	Hungary	50.28	q
9	Bregje Crolla	Netherlands	50.27	q
10	Marisela Silva	Portugal	50.00	q
11	Doriane Gilibert	France	49.37	q
12	Franziska Krebs	Germany	49.18	q
13	Jane Lindved	Denmark	48.97	
14	Ivana Vuković	Croatia	48.15	
15	Romina Ugatai	France	47.34	
16	Marharyta Dorozhon	Ukraine	45.15	

== Participation ==
According to an unofficial count, 16 athletes from 13 countries participated in the event.

- Belarus (1)
- Croatia (1)
- Denmark (1)
- France (2)
- Germany (3)
- Greece (1)
- Hungary (1)
- Latvia (1)
- Netherlands (1)
- Portugal (1)
- Romania (1)
- Russia (1)
- Ukraine (1)
