= 2009 European Athletics U23 Championships – Women's javelin throw =

The women's javelin throw event at the 2009 European Athletics U23 Championships was held in Kaunas, Lithuania, at S. Dariaus ir S. Girėno stadionas (Darius and Girėnas Stadium) on 18 and 19 July.

== Medalists ==
Gold	Madara Palameika; Latvia
Silver	Vira Rebryk; Ukraine
Bronze	Anna Wessman; Sweden

== Results ==
=== Final ===
19 July

Rank	Name	Nationality	Attempts						Result	Notes
Rank	Name	Nationality	1	2	3	4	5	6	Result	Notes
1st place, gold medalist(s)	Madara Palameika	Latvia	60.10	56.21	59.66	x	49.44	64.51	64.51	CR
2nd place, silver medalist(s)	Vira Rebryk	Ukraine	59.79	58.64	60.62	x	61.43	x	61.43	
3rd place, bronze medalist(s)	Anna Wessman	Sweden	49.71	55.91	x	49.85	53.75	55.42	55.91	
4	Sandra Schaffarzik	Germany	60.57	x	52.67	54.49	54.96	x	54.96	
5	Raine Kuningas	Estonia	54.47	x	53.55	54.56	52.63	x	54.56	
6	Anaëlle Fournier	France	48.23	47.95	53.22	49.05	x	53.90	53.90	
7	Kristine Buša	Latvia	53.62	47.98	49.83	x	53.25	51.38	53.62	
8	Jelena Jaakkola	Finland	49.50	x	52.79	50.26	x	x	52.79	
9	Sinta Ozoliņa	Latvia	50.84	52.20	52.06				52.20	
10	Elisabeth Eberl	Austria	48.36	x	50.52				50.52	
11	Ramona Anghelaş	Romania	48.59	49.77	x				49.77	
12	Oona Sormunen	Finland	46.58	48.50	x				48.50	

=== Qualifications ===
18 July
Qualifying 54.00 or 12 best to the Final

==== Group A ====
Rank	Name	Nationality	Result	Notes
1	Madara Palameika	Latvia	59.70	Q
2	Oona Sormunen	Finland	56.22	Q
3	Kristine Buša	Latvia	54.58	Q
4	Anaëlle Fournier	France	53.40	q
5	Ramona Anghelaş	Romania	52.46	q
6	Elisabeth Eberl	Austria	52.35	q
7	Aleksandra Spikina	Russia	51.73	
8	Anna Urbicka	Poland	51.16	
9	Maryna Buksa	Belarus	50.61	
10	Evelien Dekkers	Netherlands	46.22	

==== Group B ====
Rank	Name	Nationality	Result	Notes
1	Vira Rebryk	Ukraine	57.56	Q
2	Raine Kuningas	Estonia	56.99	Q
2	Raine Kuningas	Estonia	56.99	Q
4	Jelena Jaakkola	Finland	55.48	Q
5	Anna Wessman	Sweden	55.04	Q
6	Sinta Ozoliņa	Latvia	54.94	Q
7	Melissa Boekelman	Netherlands	51.80	
8	Urszula Kuncewicz	Poland	48.32	
9	Viktorija Barvičiūtė	Lithuania	48.08	
10	Tove Beate Dahle	Norway	45.39	
	Matilde Andraud	France	DNS	

== Participation ==
According to an unofficial count, 20 athletes from 15 countries participated in the event.

- Austria (1)
- Belarus (1)
- Estonia (1)
- Finland (2)
- France (1)
- Germany (1)
- Latvia (3)
- Lithuania (1)
- Netherlands (2)
- Norway (1)
- Poland (2)
- Romania (1)
- Russia (1)
- Sweden (1)
- Ukraine (1)
