= Nikola Ogrodníková =

Czech javelin thrower (born 1990)

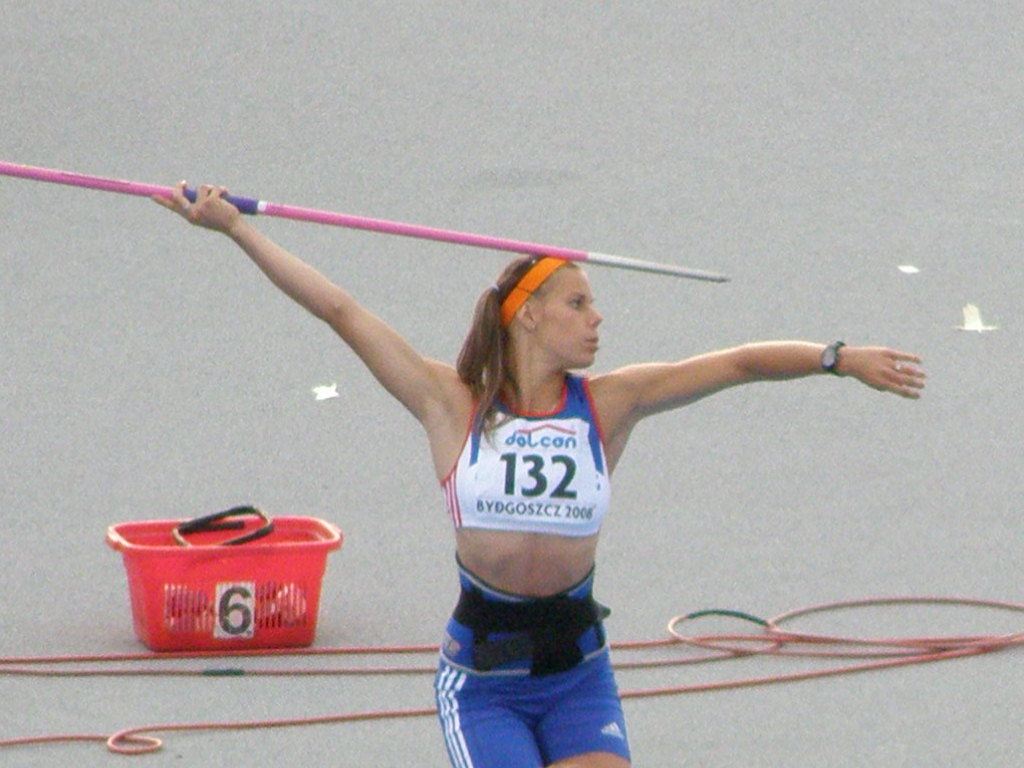
- Ogrodníková in 2008

Personal information
- Born: 18 August 1990 (age 36) Ostrava, Czechoslovakia

Sport
- Sport: Athletics
- Event: Javelin throw
- Club: SSK Vítkovice
- Coached by: Aleš Duda (2007–2011); Stanislav Šuška (2011–2015); Vítězslav Veselý
Medal record
Women's athletics
Representing Czech Republic
Olympic Games
Bronze medal – third place	2024 Paris	Javelin throw
European Championships
Silver medal – second place	2018 Berlin	Javelin throw
European Games
Silver medal – second place	2023 Kraków-Małopolska	Javelin throw
European Junior Championships
Bronze medal – third place	2007 Hengelo	Heptathlon

Nikola Ogrodníková (Czech pronunciation: [ˈnɪkola ˈoɡrodɲiːkovaː]; born 18 August 1990) is a Czech athlete specialising in the javelin throw. She is a two-time Olympian and won a bronze medal in the women's javelin throw at the 2024 Summer Olympics. Ogrodníková is also a European Championships and European Games silver medallist.

Her personal best in the event is 67.40 metres set in Offenburg in 2019. Earlier in her career, Ogrodníková competed in the heptathlon and won a bronze medal in the discipline at the 2007 European Junior Championships.

== International competitions ==
Year	Competition	Venue	Position	Event	Notes
Representing the Czech Republic
2007	World Youth Championships	Ostrava, Czech Republic	7th	Heptathlon (youth)	5161 pts
2007	European Junior Championships	Hengelo, Netherlands	3rd	Heptathlon	5607 pts
2008	World Junior Championships	Bydgoszcz, Poland	8th	Javelin throw	53.94 m
2008	World Junior Championships	Bydgoszcz, Poland	22nd	Heptathlon	4735 pts
2009	European Junior Championships	Novi Sad, Serbia	17th (q)	Javelin throw	38.50 m
2011	European U23 Championships	Ostrava, Czech Republic	22nd (q)	Javelin throw	48.04 m
2014	European Championships	Zurich, Switzerland	20th (q)	Javelin throw	53.15 m
2017	World Championships	London, United Kingdom	19th (q)	Javelin throw	59.99 m
2018	European Championships	Berlin, Germany	2nd	Javelin throw	61.85 m
2019	World Championships	Doha, Qatar	11th	Javelin throw	57.24 m
2021	Olympic Games	Tokyo, Japan	16th (q)	Javelin throw	60.03 m
2022	World Championships	Eugene, United States	8th	Javelin throw	60.18 m
2022	European Championships	Munich, Germany	12th	Javelin throw	54.48 m
2023	World Championships	Budapest, Hungary	28th (q)	Javelin throw	54.59 m
2024	European Championships	Rome, Italy	5th	Javelin throw	61.78 m
2024	Olympic Games	Paris, France	3rd	Javelin throw	63.68 m
2026	European Championships	Birmingham, United Kingdom	16th (q)	Javelin throw	55.87 m
