= Linda Stahl =

German javelin thrower

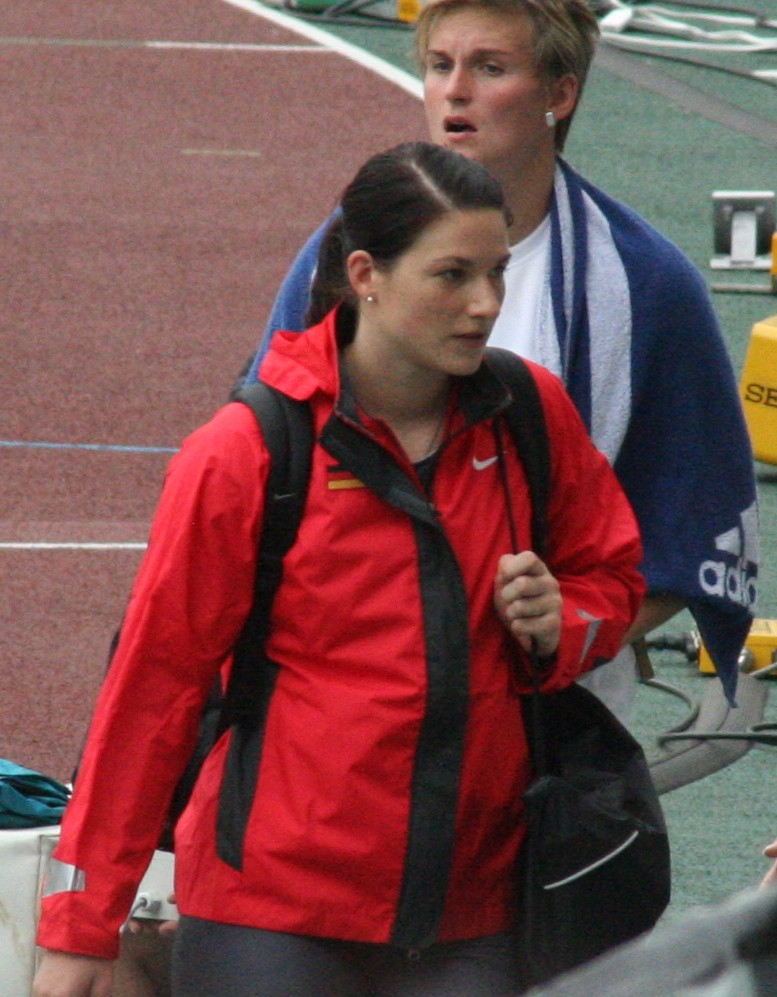
- Linda Stahl at the 2007 World Championships

Personal information
- Born: 2 October 1985 (age 41) Steinheim, West Germany
- Height: 1.75 m (5 ft 9 in)
- Weight: 78 kg (172 lb)

Sport
- Country: Germany
- Sport: Track and field
- Event: Javelin throw
Medal record
Olympic Games
Bronze medal – third place	2012 London	Javelin
European Championships
Gold medal – first place	2010 Barcelona	Javelin throw
Silver medal – second place	2016 Amsterdam	Javelin throw
Bronze medal – third place	2012 Helsinki	Javelin throw
Bronze medal – third place	2014 Zürich	Javelin throw

Linda Stahl (born 2 October 1985) is a retired German track and field athlete who competed in the javelin throw.

== Career ==
She won gold at the 2010 European Athletics Championships in Barcelona, Spain, throwing a then personal best throw of 66.81 metres.

Stahl finished 3rd at the Europeans in 2012 with a result of 63.69 m. She also took the bronze medal at the Olympics in London with a season's best throw of 64.91 m.

In 2013, she was 4th at the World Championships in Moscow with a result of 64.78 m.

In 2014, she took the bronze at the Europeans in Zürich after leading the competition till the 5th round, and also improved her personal best to 67.32 m.

She grew up in Blomberg, and studies medicine at the University of Cologne. She represented the sports club TSV Bayer 04 Leverkusen, having changed club in 2003 from LG Lippe-Süd, and trained with Steffi Nerius under coach Helge Zöllkau.

== Achievements ==
Year	Competition	Venue	Position	Notes
2007	European U23 Championships	Debrecen, Hungary	1st	62.17 m
2007	World Championships	Osaka, Japan	8th	61.03 m
2007	World Athletics Final	Stuttgart, Germany	8th	55.62 m
2009	World Championships	Berlin, Germany	6th	63.23 m
2010	European Cup Winter Throwing	Arles, France	3rd	60.56 m
2010	European Championships	Barcelona, Spain	1st	66.81 m
2011	World Championships	Daegu, South Korea	9th (q)	60.21 m
2012	European Championships	Helsinki, Finland	3rd	63.69 m
2012	Olympic Games	London, United Kingdom	3rd	64.91 m
2013	European Cup Winter Throwing	Castellón, Spain	3rd	61.97 m
2013	World Championships	Moscow, Russia	4th	64.78 m
2014	European Championships	Zürich, Switzerland	3rd	63.91 m
2015	World Championships	Beijing, China	10th	59.88 m
2016	European Championships	Amsterdam, Netherlands	2nd	65.25 m
2016	Olympic Games	Rio de Janeiro, Brazil	11th	59.71 m
