= 2006 World Junior Championships in Athletics – Women's javelin throw =

The women's javelin throw event at the 2006 World Junior Championships in Athletics was held in Beijing, China, at Chaoyang Sports Centre on 15 and 19 August 2006.

== Medalists ==
Gold	Sandra Schaffarzik; Germany
Silver	Vira Rebryk; Ukraine
Bronze	Margaryta Dorozhon; Ukraine

== Results ==
=== Final ===
19 August 2006

Rank	Name	Nationality	Attempts						Result	Notes
Rank	Name	Nationality	1	2	3	4	5	6	Result	Notes
1st place, gold medalist(s)	Sandra Schaffarzik	Germany	55.26	60.45	55.05	x	57.14	57.69	60.45	
2nd place, silver medalist(s)	Vira Rebryk	Ukraine	56.93	57.79	x	53.39	53.83	56.85	57.79	
3rd place, bronze medalist(s)	Margaryta Dorozhon	Ukraine	57.68	52.08	53.23	52.81	x	47.27	57.68	
4	Zhang Li	China	57.35	57.52	57.15	x	55.79	57.15	57.52	
5	Maryna Buksa	Belarus	55.84	56.67	55.20	x	x	-	56.67	
6	Sinta Ozoliņa	Latvia	46.83	x	56.38	x	53.01	49.51	56.38	
7	Vivian Zimmer	Germany	x	54.31	54.67	x	54.59	x	54.67	
8	Li Lingwei	China	53.17	53.73	53.15	54.26	50.15	52.39	54.26	
9	Kim Gyeong-Ae	South Korea	49.06	47.56	51.73				51.73	
10	María Zerva	Greece	50.99	49.26	46.37				50.99	
11	Jelena Jaakkola	Finland	x	49.37	47.10				49.37	
12	Elizabeth Gleadle	Canada	43.78	46.53	48.08				48.08	

=== Qualifications ===
15 August 2006

==== Group A ====
Rank	Name	Nationality	Attempts			Result	Notes
Rank	Name	Nationality	1	2	3	Result	Notes
1	Vivian Zimmer	Germany	56.15	-	-	56.15	Q
2	Vira Rebryk	Ukraine	55.61	-	-	55.61	Q
3	Li Lingwei	China	49.03	53.99	-	53.99	Q
4	Elizabeth Gleadle	Canada	45.15	44.92	48.87	48.87	q
5	Momoko Matsumoto	Japan	x	48.46	x	48.46	
6	Annabel Thomson	Australia	x	46.51	x	46.51	
7	Madara Palameika	Latvia	x	x	46.34	46.34	
8	Ramona Anghelas	Romania	44.24	41.38	45.02	45.02	
9	Iris Núñez	Dominican Republic	40.50	38.97	44.79	44.79	
10	Sonja Alasalmi	Finland	x	44.22	x	44.22	
	Jucilene de Lima	Brazil	x	-	-	NM	

==== Group B ====
Rank	Name	Nationality	Attempts			Result	Notes
Rank	Name	Nationality	1	2	3	Result	Notes
1	Sandra Schaffarzik	Germany	x	53.44	-	53.44	Q
2	María Zerva	Greece	53.30	-	-	53.30	Q
2	Margaryta Dorozhon	Ukraine	53.30	-	-	53.30	Q
4	Maryna Buksa	Belarus	52.21	-	-	52.21	Q
5	Zhang Li	China	52.20	-	-	52.20	Q
6	Sinta Ozoliņa	Latvia	51.89	-	-	51.89	Q
7	Kim Gyeong-Ae	South Korea	45.71	47.20	50.37	50.37	q
8	Jelena Jaakkola	Finland	x	50.22	x	50.22	q
9	Agnieszka Lewandowska	Poland	46.90	47.89	48.46	48.46	
10	Evelien Dekkers	Netherlands	42.44	x	45.21	45.21	
11	Zoe Pelbart	Australia	43.60	x	40.50	43.60	
12	Bekah Stolz	United States	39.05	x	41.99	41.99	

== Participation ==
According to an unofficial count, 23 athletes from 17 countries participated in the event.

- Australia (2)
- Belarus (1)
- Brazil (1)
- Canada (1)
- China (2)
- Dominican Republic (1)
- Finland (2)
- Germany (2)
- Greece (1)
- Japan (1)
- Latvia (2)
- Netherlands (1)
- Poland (1)
- Romania (1)
- South Korea (1)
- Ukraine (2)
- United States (1)
