= Hanna Hatsko-Fedusova =

Ukrainian javelin thrower (born 1990)

Hanna Volodymyrivna Hatsko-Fedusova (Ukrainian: Ганна Володимирівна Гацько-Федусова; born 3 October 1990 in Zaporizhia) is a Ukrainian track and field athlete who competes in the javelin throw. She competed in the javelin throw at the 2012, and 2016 Summer Olympics.

== Competition record ==
Year	Competition	Venue	Position	Event	Notes
Representing Ukraine
2009	European Junior Championships	Novi Sad, Serbia	10th	Javelin throw	47.56 m
2011	European U23 Championships	Ostrava, Czech Republic	5th	Javelin throw	55.58 m
2012	Olympic Games	London, United Kingdom	22nd (q)	Javelin throw	58.37 m
2013	World Championships	Moscow, Russia	18th (q)	Javelin throw	58.63 m
2014	European Championships	Zürich, Switzerland	18th (q)	Javelin throw	53.81 m
2015	World Championships	Beijing, China	15th (q)	Javelin throw	61.41 m
2016	European Championships	Amsterdam, Netherlands	10th	Javelin throw	58.86 m
2016	Olympic Games	Rio de Janeiro, Brazil	19th (q)	Javelin throw	58.90 m
2017	World Championships	London, United Kingdom	30th (q)	Javelin throw	51.90 m
2018	European Championships	Berlin, Germany	21st (q)	Javelin throw	53.08 m
2019	World Championships	Doha, Qatar	26th (q)	Javelin throw	55.84 m
2022	European Championships	Munich, Germany	13th (q)	Javelin throw	57.39 m
