= 2010 European Athletics Championships – Women's javelin throw =

European Athletics Championship

Women's javelin throw at the European Athletics Championships

The women's javelin throw at the 2010 European Athletics Championships was held at the Estadi Olímpic Lluís Companys on 27 and 29 July.

== Medalists ==
Gold	Linda Stahl; Germany (GER)
Silver	Christina Obergföll; Germany (GER)
Bronze	Barbora Špotáková; Czech Republic (CZE)

== Records ==
Standing records prior to the 2010 European Athletics Championships
World record	Barbora Špotáková (CZE)	72.28	Stuttgart, Germany	13 September 2008
European record	Barbora Špotáková (CZE)	72.28	Stuttgart, Germany	13 September 2008
Championship record	Mirela Manjani (GRE)	67.47	Munich, Germany	8 August 2002
World Leading	Mariya Abakumova (RUS)	68.89	Doha, Qatar	14 May 2010
European Leading	Mariya Abakumova (RUS)	68.89	Doha, Qatar	14 May 2010

== Schedule ==
Date	Time	Round
27 July 2010	19:05	Qualification
29 July 2010	20:40	Final

== Results ==
=== Qualification ===
Qualification: Qualification Performance 59.50 (Q) or at least 12 best performers advance to the final

Rank	Group	Athlete	Nationality	#1	#2	#3	Result	Notes
1	B	Barbora Špotáková	Czech Republic	65.56			65.56	Q
2	A	Christina Obergföll	Germany	65.05			65.05	Q
DSQ	A	Mariya Abakumova	Russia	x	56.15	62.52	62.52	Q
4	B	Martina Ratej	Slovenia	61.92			61.92	Q
5	A	Katharina Molitor	Germany	59.74			59.74	Q
6	A	Madara Palameika	Latvia	58.06	53.82	58.85	58.85	q
7	A	Jarmila Klimešová	Czech Republic	52.26	51.57	58.45	58.45	q
8	B	Linda Stahl	Germany	x	57.42	x	57.42	q
9	B	Tatjana Jelača	Serbia	53.64	52.07	56.89	56.89	q
10	B	Mercedes Chilla	Spain	56.78	x	x	56.78	q
11	A	Zahra Bani	Italy	56.68	x	52.19	56.68	q
12	B	Ásdís Hjálmsdóttir	Iceland	49.47	51.55	56.55	56.55	q
13	B	Sinta Ozoliņa	Latvia	53.99	x	56.11	56.11	
14	B	Bregje Crolla	Netherlands	55.82	51.95	55.33	55.82	
15	B	Maria Negoita	Romania	55.68	54.49	55.34	55.68	
16	B	Elisabeth Pauer	Austria	53.45	x	53.02	53.45	
17	A	Vira Rebryk	Ukraine	x	52.31	51.09	52.31	
18	A	Felicia Ţilea-Moldovan	Romania	x	x	46.51	46.51	
19	A	Evelien Dekkers	Netherlands	x	x	46.37	46.37	
	A	Oona Sormunen	Finland	x	x	x	NM	
	A	Sávva Líka	Greece	—	—	—	DNS	

=== Final ===
Rank	Athlete	Nationality	#1	#2	#3	#4	#5	#6	Result	Notes
1st place, gold medalist(s)	Linda Stahl	Germany	60.36	57.31	63.17	x	66.81	64.13	66.81	PB
2nd place, silver medalist(s)	Christina Obergföll	Germany	61.46	64.12	63.76	62.78	65.58	x	65.58	
3rd place, bronze medalist(s)	Barbora Špotáková	Czech Republic	65.36	62.89	x	x	65.09	x	65.36	
4	Katharina Molitor	Germany	61.44	59.69	58.45	x	x	63.81	63.81	
DSQ	Mariya Abakumova	Russia	60.87	61.46	58.79	61.18	x	x	61.46	
6	Mercedes Chilla	Spain	57.82	61.40	x	61.37	58.38	60.99	61.40	
7	Martina Ratej	Slovenia	60.08	x	x	60.71	x	60.99	60.99	
8	Madara Palameika	Latvia	55.22	53.44	59.70	57.76	60.78	x	60.78	
9	Jarmila Klimešová	Czech Republic	56.37	56.50	x				56.50	
10	Ásdís Hjálmsdóttir	Iceland	x	54.32	52.32				54.32	
11	Zahra Bani	Italy	51.70	x	53.67				53.67	
12	Tatjana Jelača	Serbia	x	45.99	52.13				52.13	
