= Zhang Li (javelin thrower, born 1989) =

Chinese javelin thrower

Personal information
- Born: 17 January 1989 (age 37) Jiangxi, China
- Height: 1.70 m (5 ft 7 in)
- Weight: 62 kg (137 lb)

Sport
- Country: China
- Sport: Athletics
- Event: Javelin
- Updated on 11 August 2012

Zhang Li (Chinese: 张莉; pinyin: Zhāng Lì; born 17 January 1989) is a Chinese javelin thrower. Her personal best throw is 65.47 metres, achieved in September 2014 in Incheon.

== Biography ==
She won the 2005 World Youth Championships, finished fifth at the 2005 Asian Championships, fourth at the 2006 World Junior Championships, fourth at the 2008 World Junior Championships and tenth at the 2008 Olympic Games. She won the silver medal in the women's javelin throw event at the 2009 East Asian Games held in Hong Kong.

== Achievements ==
| Year | Competition | Venue | Position | Notes |
Representing China
| 2005 | World Youth Championships | Hong Kong, China | 1st | 56.66 m |
| 2005 | Asian Championships | Incheon, South Korea | 5th | 54.11 m |
| 2006 | World Junior Championships | Beijing, China | 4th | 57.52 m |
| 2008 | World Junior Championships | Bydgoszcz, Poland | 4th | 56.68 m |
| 2009 | East Asian Games | Hong Kong, China | 2nd | 58.12 m |
| 2012 | Olympic Games | London, United Kingdom | 23rd (q) | 58.35 m |
| 2013 | Asian Championships | Pune, India | 5th | 53.85 m |
| 2013 | World Championships | Moscow, Russia | 15th (q) | 60.16 m |
| 2014 | Asian Games | Incheon, South Korea | 1st | 65.47 m |
| 2015 | World Championships | Beijing, China | 14th (q) | 61.80 m |
