= Oona Sormunen =

Finnish javelin thrower

Oona Anniina Sormunen (born 2 August 1989 in Kitee, Finland) is a Finnish javelin thrower. She has represented Finland in 2010 and 2012 European Championships.

Sormunen has a personal best of 60.56m set in 2013.

== Competition record ==
Year	Competition	Venue	Position	Event	Notes
Representing Finland
2007	European Junior Championships	Hengelo, Netherlands	12th	Javelin throw	46.02 m
2008	World Junior Championships	Bydgoszcz, Poland	19th (q)	Javelin throw	46.32 m
2009	European U23 Championships	Kaunas, Lithuania	12th	Javelin	48.50 m
2010	European Championships	Barcelona, Spain	–	Javelin throw	NM
2011	European U23 Championships	Ostrava, Czech Republic	3rd	Javelin throw	58.54 m
2012	European Championships	Helsinki, Finland	14th (q)	Javelin throw	54.66 m
2014	European Championships	Zürich, Switzerland	22nd (q)	Javelin throw	51.46 m
