= Li Lingwei (javelin thrower) =

Chinese javelin thrower (born 1989)

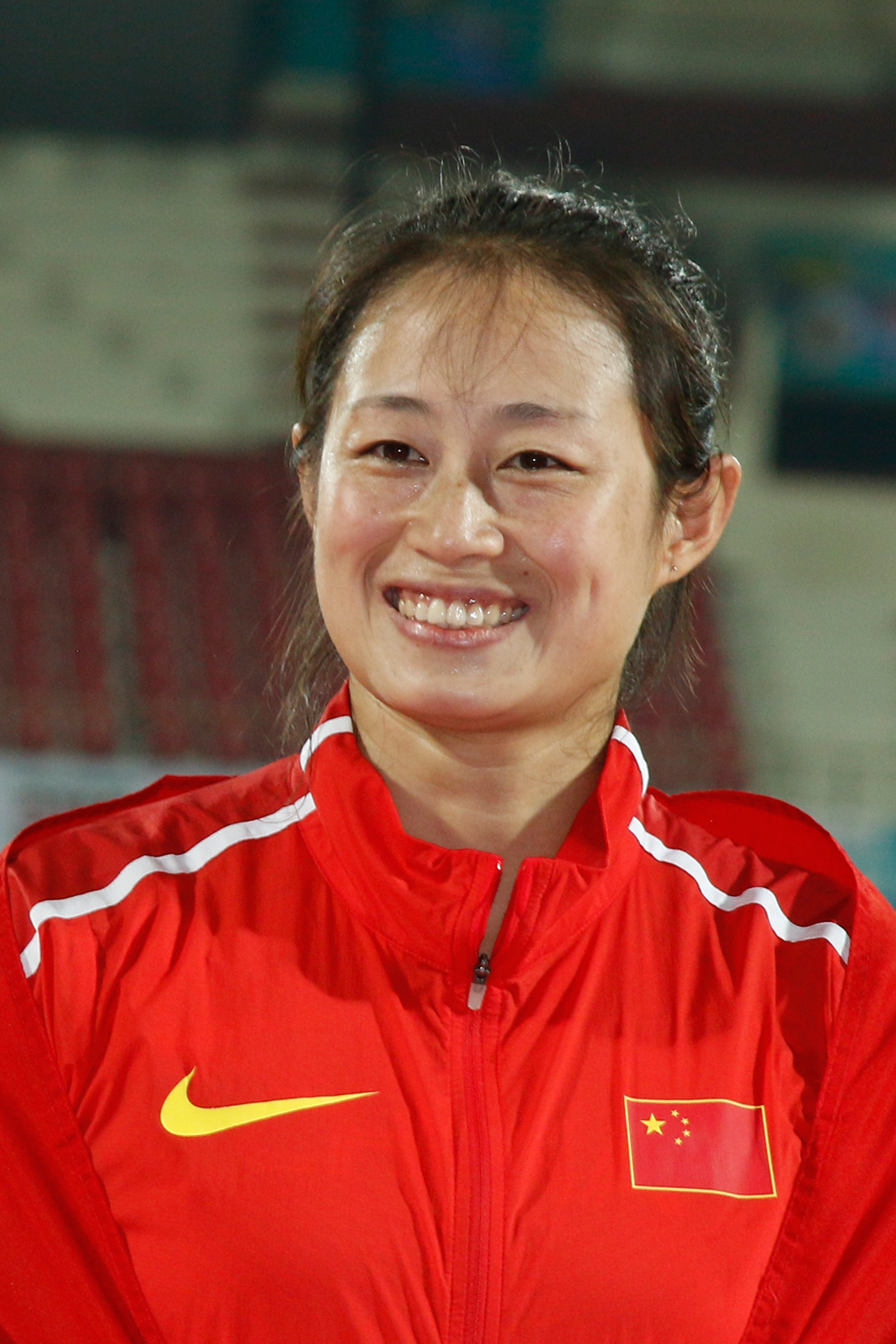

Personal information
- Born: January 26, 1989 (age 37) Binzhou
- Height: 1.74 m (5 ft 9 in)
- Weight: 70 kg (154 lb)

Sport
- Country: China
- Sport: Athletics
- Event: Javelin throw
Medal record
World Championships
Silver medal – second place	2017 London	Javelin throw

Li Lingwei (Chinese: 李玲蔚; pinyin: Lǐ Língwèi; born January 26, 1989, in Binzhou) is a Chinese track and field athlete who specialises in the javelin throw.

In 2017 she set a new personal best of 66.25 m at the 2017 World Championship in London. It was more than a metre further than her previous personal best.

In 2017 she represented her country in India at the 2017 Asian Athletics Championships – Women's javelin throw. She took the gold medal with a throw over 63 m beating Dilhani Lekamge of Sri Lanka who had a throw of over 57 metres. She beat her former training partner Nadeeka Lakmali. Li's throw of 63.06 m was a new championship record.

She has held the Asian area women's javelin record. She also set a then meet record of 60.65 m, at the 2013 Asian Athletics Championship in Pune. She won the 12th Chinese National Games in 2013 with a throw of 63.06 m, a season's best. She won the 2014 Chinese National Championships with a throw of 62.56 m, again a season's best.

== Competition record ==
Year	Competition	Venue	Position	Notes
Representing China
2006	World Junior Championships	Beijing, China	8th	54.26 m
2008	Asian Junior Championships	Jakarta, Indonesia	1st	54.72 m
2008	World Junior Championships	Bydgoszcz, Poland	2nd	59.25 m
2009	Asian Championships	Guangzhou, China	2nd	55.13 m
2010	Asian Games	Guangzhou, China	3rd	57.51 m
2012	Olympic Games	London, United Kingdom	30th (q)	56.50 m
2013	Asian Championships	Pune, India	1st	60.65 m
2013	World Championships	Moscow, Russia	8th	61.30 m
2014	Asian Games	Incheon, South Korea	2nd	61.43 m
2015	World Championships	Beijing, China	5th	64.10 m
2016	Olympic Games	Rio de Janeiro, Brazil	15th (q)	60.91 m
2017	Asian Championships	Bhubaneswar, India	1st	63.06 m
2017	World Championships	London, United Kingdom	2nd	66.25 m
