= Marharyta Dorozhon =

Israeli javelin thrower (born 1987)

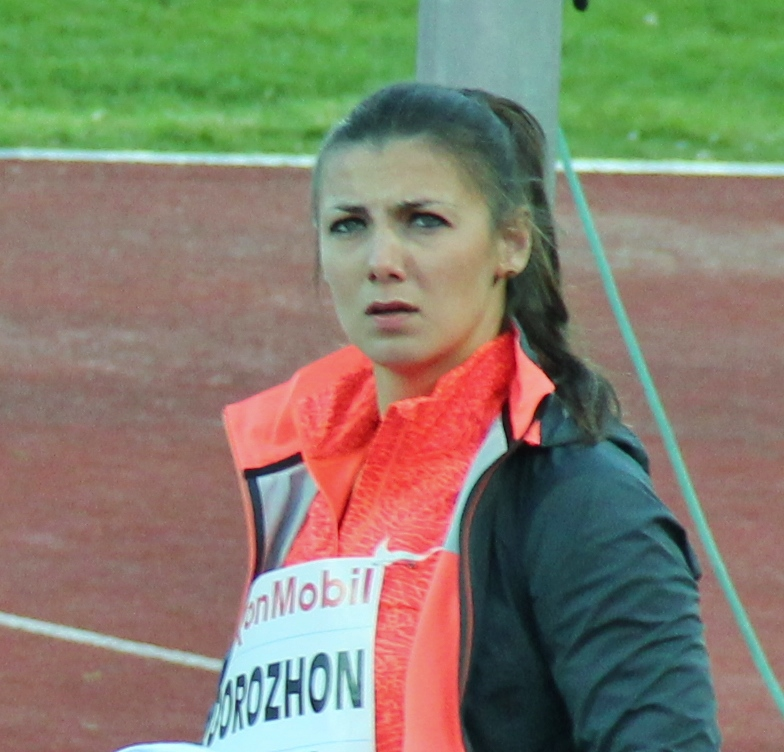
- Marharyta Dorozhon at the 2015 Bislett Games

Personal information
- Native name: Маргарита Дорожон
- Full name: Marharyta Serhiïvna Dorozhon
- Citizenship: Israel
- Born: 4 September 1987 (age 39) Dnipropetrovsk, Ukrainian SSR, USSR
- Agent: Jose Praia
- Height: 1.80 m (5 ft 11 in)
- Weight: 76 kg (168 lb)

Sport
- Sport: Track and field
- Event: Javelin throw
- Club: Hapoel Emek Hefer
- Coached by: Alexander Drigol and Vladimir Kharun

Achievements and titles
- Personal best: 64.56 m (2015; Israeli national record)
Medal record
Women's athletics
Representing UKR
World Junior Championships
Bronze medal – third place	2006 Beijing	Javelin
Representing ISR
European Games
Bronze medal – third place	2015 Baku	Mixed Team
Maccabiah Games
Gold medal – first place	2017 Israel	Javelin
- Updated on 31 May 2015

Marharyta Serhiïvna Dorozhon (Ukrainian: Маргарита Сергіївна Дорожон, Hebrew: מרגריטה סרגייבנה דורוז'ון; born 4 September 1987) is an Israeli javelin thrower. Born and raised in Ukraine, she competed for that country until she became an Israeli citizen in 2014.

Competing for Ukraine, Dorozhon came in third at the 11th IAAF World Junior Championships, and finished 14th in the women's javelin throw event at the 2012 Summer Olympics. She won the 2013 István Gyulai Memorial with a throw of 61.31 m, the 2013 Ukrainian Championships with a throw of 62.01 m, and the 2014 IAAF World Challenge Seiko Golden Grand Prix with a throw of 59.15 m in Tokyo, Japan.

Dorozhon represented Israel in April 2015, four months after she became a citizen. In May 2015 she won the IAAF World Challenge Golden Spike Ostrava javelin throw in the Czech Republic, with a personal best and Israeli national record winning throw of 63.85. The following month, she won a gold medal and again set an Israeli national record at the IAAF Diamond League Bislett Games in Norway, with a throw of 64.56 m. She won a gold medal representing Israel at the 2015 European Games that same month, with her throw of 58.00 m establishing a new European Games record.

== Personal life ==
Dorozhon was born on 4 September 1987 in Dnipropetrovsk, Dnipropetrovsk Oblast, in the Ukrainian SSR of the Soviet Union. She became an Israeli citizen in December 2014.

== Competitive history ==
Dorozhon is coached by Alexander Drigol, and her agent is Jose Praia. She competes for the Israeli club Hapoel Emek Hefer.

=== Competitor for Ukraine ===
At the 11th IAAF World Junior Championships, on 19 August 2006 in the Chaoyang Sports Centre in Beijing, China, Dorozhon came in third with a throw of 57.68 m. At the time, it was a personal best.

Dorozhon competed for Ukraine in the women's javelin throw event at the 2012 Summer Olympics. She came in 14th with a throw of 56.74 m in the qualifying round.

She won the István Gyulai Memorial meet in Budapest, Hungary, with a throw of 61.31 m in early July 2013. In late July, Dorozhon won the Ukrainian Championships with a throw of 62.01 m. She won the 2014 IAAF World Challenge Seiko Golden Grand Prix in Tokyo, Japan, with a throw of 59.15 m.

=== Competitor for Israel ===
Dorozhon married Alex Bugoslavsky, an Israeli, and became an Israeli citizen in December 2014. She concurrently switched her sporting allegiance to Israel. Soon thereafter she joined the Israeli club Hapoel Emek Hefer. In April 2015, in her first competition representing Israel, Dorozhon set a new Israeli national record with a throw of 63.34 m at the Hadassah Youth Cup in Hadassah Neurim, Israel.

On 26 May 2015, Dorozhon won the IAAF World Challenge Golden Spike Ostrava javelin throw in Ostrava, the Czech Republic, with a winning throw of 63.85 m in the second round. In winning the event, she upset favorites 2008 and 2012 Olympic champion Barbora Spotakova of the Czech Republic and 2011 world champion Mariya Abakumova of Russia. It was her second Israeli national record of 2015. The throw was her personal best. She said: "The fact that my name appeared next to an Israeli flag in my first international competition in which I ... represented my new country gave me a great honor, and I hope people start to appreciate Israel in international women's javelin."

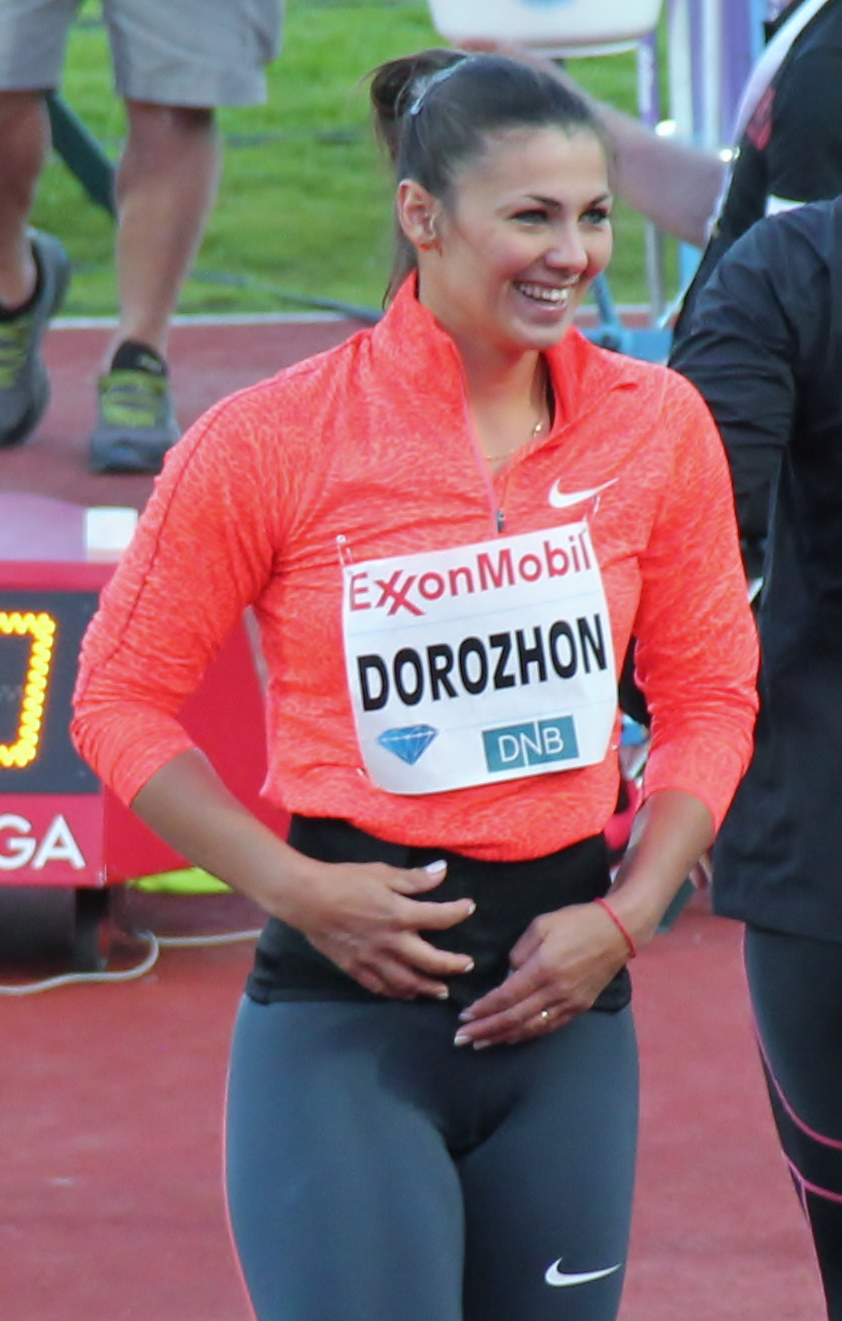
Dorozhon in June 2015.

She won a gold medal and again set a national record for the third time in 2015 when she represented Israel at the IAAF Diamond League Bislett Games in Oslo, Norway on 11 June 2015, winning the women's javelin with a new personal record throw of 64.56 m, as former two-time Olympic champion Barbora Spotakova took the bronze medal and the current world champion, Christina Obergföll, came in seventh. The throw was the eighth-best in the world to that point in 2015, and equaled the distance of the fourth-place throw at the 2012 Summer Olympics. She won a gold medal representing Israel at the 2015 European Games on 21 June 2015, with her throw of 58.00 m establishing a new European Games record.

In September 2015 she won an IAAF World Challenge in Berlin, Germany. She defeated world champion Katharina Molitor in her home country with a throw of 63.24m.

She did not qualify for the 2016 Olympic Games in Rio, because though she met the IAAF Qualifying Standard for the Olympics she did not meet the higher 60-meter standard required by the Olympic Committee of Israel in 2016, as she was struggling with a groin injury.

In June 2017 she won a bronze medal at the IAAF World Challenge meeting in Hengelo, the Netherlands, with a throw of 60.63m.

At the 2017 Maccabiah Games, Dorozhon won the women's competition with a throw of 63.07m, qualifying her for the 2017 World Championships in Athletics.

== See also ==
- List of Israeli records in athletics
