= Melissa Dupré =

Belgian javelin thrower

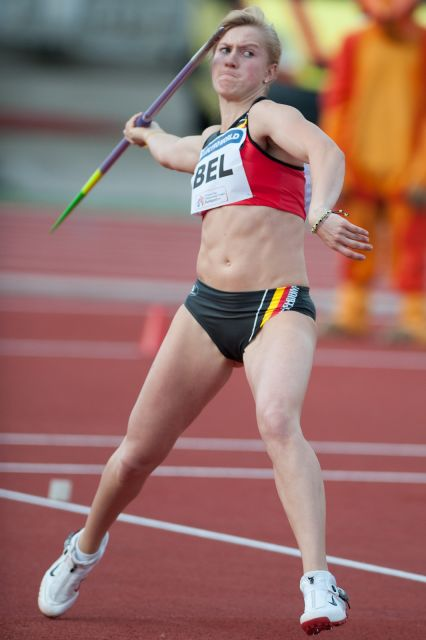
- Dupré in 2010

Personal information
- Born: November 5, 1986 (age 39)

Sport
- Country: Belgium
- Sport: Track and field
- Event: Javelin throw

Achievements and titles
- Personal bests: 58.51 m (NR)
Medal record
Women's javelin throw
Representing Belgium
Event	1st	2nd	3rd
Belgian Championships	9	2	—
Total	9	2	0
Belgian Athletics Championships
Silver medal – second place	2005 Brussels	Women's javelin
Silver medal – second place	2006 Brussels	Women's javelin
Gold medal – first place	2007 Brussels	Women's javelin
Gold medal – first place	2008 Liège	Women's javelin
Gold medal – first place	2009 Lede	Women's javelin
Gold medal – first place	2010 Brussels	Women's javelin
Gold medal – first place	2011 Brussels	Women's javelin
Gold medal – first place	2012 Brussels	Women's javelin
Gold medal – first place	2014 Brussels	Women's javelin
Gold medal – first place	2015 Brussels	Women's javelin
Gold medal – first place	2016 Brussels	Women's javelin
- Updated on August 31, 2016

Melissa Dupré (born 5 November 1986) is a Belgian track and field athlete who competes in the javelin throw.

Dupré is one of the most decorated Belgian athletes winning nine gold medals and a total of eleven medals total in the Belgian Athletics Championships. She has also represented Belgium in numerous international competitions including European Team Championships, Summer Universiade, European Cup and the Youth Summer Olympics.

Dupré has advanced to the finals in many international competition, however she has never finished on the podium. Dupré's highest finish was 4th and finished 5th twice in the European Cup and Championships.

== Competition results ==
Belgian Athletics Championships

Year	Venue	Best throw (m)	Finish
2005	Brussels	45.75 m	2nd place, silver medalist(s)
2006	Brussels	45.98 m	2nd place, silver medalist(s)
2007	Brussels	50.02 m	1st place, gold medalist(s)
2008	Liège	47.79 m	1st place, gold medalist(s)
2009	Lede	50.07 m	1st place, gold medalist(s)
2010	Brussels	54.36 m	1st place, gold medalist(s)
2011	Brussels	56 m	1st place, gold medalist(s)
2012	Brussels	54.06 m	1st place, gold medalist(s)
2014	Brussels	54.13 m	1st place, gold medalist(s)
2015	Brussels	54.30 m	1st place, gold medalist(s)
2016	Brussels	53.13 m	1st place, gold medalist(s)
		56 m	

International results

Representing Belgium in women's javelin throw

Year	Competition	Venue	Finish	Best throw (m)
2003	European Youth Olympic Festival	(France) Paris	10th	44.39 m
2008	European Cup	(Portugal) Leiria	8th	48.09 m
2009	European Cup	(Spain) Tenerife	7th	50.96 m
2009	European Championships	(Norway) Bergen	7th	52.28 m
2009	Summer Universiade	(Croatia) Belgrade	12th	50.48 m
2010	European Championships	(Hungary) Budapest	5th	53.50 m
2011	European Championships	(Turkey) İzmir	6th	52.13 m
2011	Summer Universiade	(China) Shenzhen	5th	58.25 m
