= Martina Ratej =

Slovenian javelin thrower

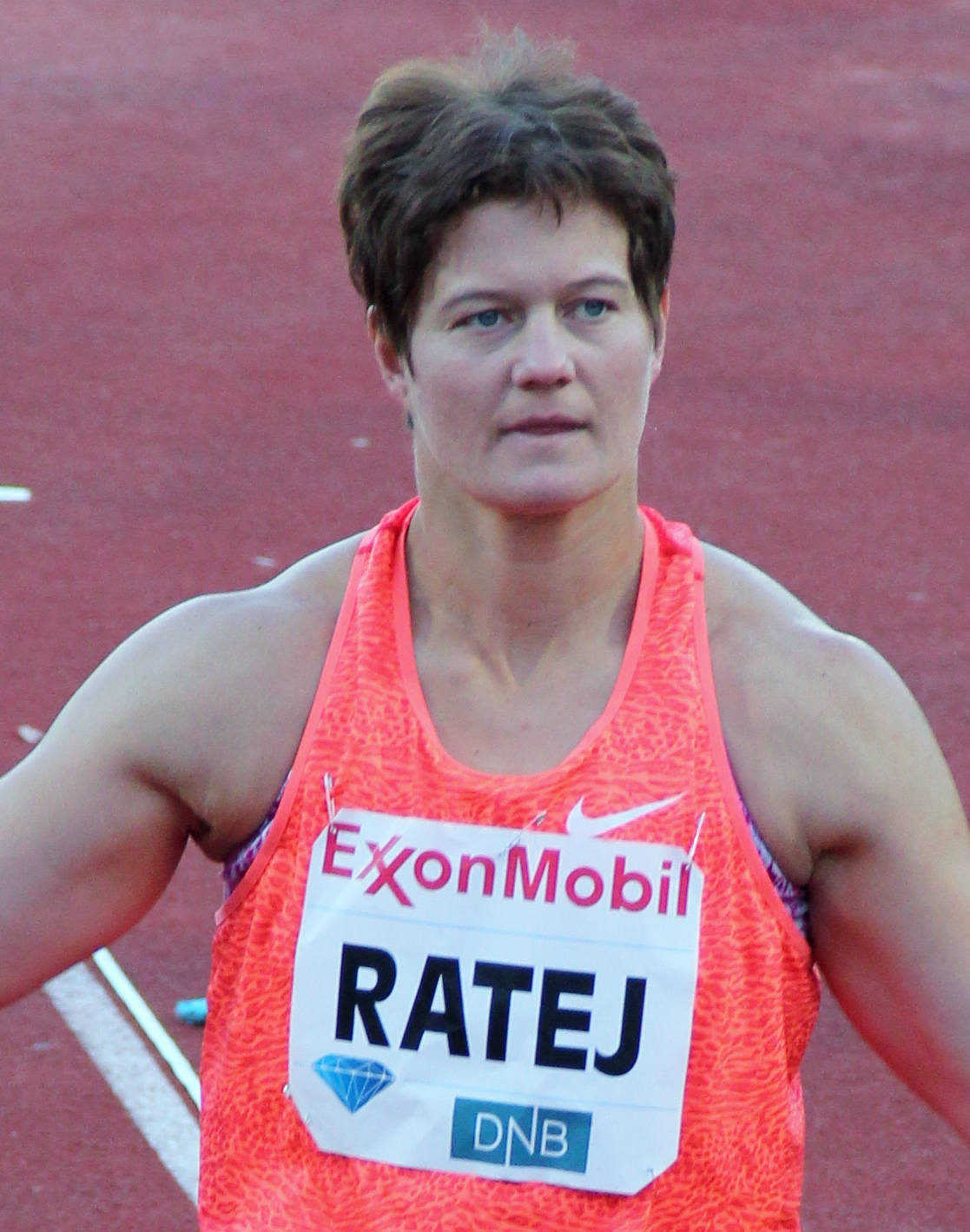
- Martina Ratej at the 2015 Bislett Games

Personal information
- Born: 2 November 1981 (age 44) Loče, SR Slovenia, SFR Yugoslavia
- Height: 1.78 m (5 ft 10 in)
- Weight: 78 kg (172 lb)

Sport
- Country: Slovenia
- Sport: Athletics
- Event: Javelin

Achievements and titles
- Personal best: 67.16 m (2010)
- Updated on 11 August 2012

Martina Ratej (born 2 November 1981) is a Slovenian track and field athlete who competes in the javelin throw.

== Career ==
Ratej competed at the 2006 European Championships and the 2008 Olympic Games without reaching the final.

Ratej won the bronze medal at the 2009 Mediterranean Games, finished eleventh at the 2009 World Championships and eighth at the 2009 World Athletics Final. These results represented a breakthrough for the athlete, who had previously struggled to make an impact at major competitions.

Ratej broke the Slovenian record at the 2010 European Cup Winter Throwing, winning the gold with a throw of 65.96 m. As a result, she was runner-up in the European Athletics athlete of the month competition.

In 2012, she competed at the Olympic Games in London where she reached the final and finished seventh.

== Doping disqualification ==
Martina Ratej was definitively suspended for doping on 10 March 2020 because she was found positive at the London 2012 Olympics.

== Achievements ==
Year	Competition	Venue	Position	Notes
Representing Slovenia
2000	World Junior Championships	Santiago, Chile	15th (q)	46.83 m
2006	European Championships	Gothenburg, Sweden	21st (q)	55.49 m
2008	European Cup – Second League – Group B	Banská Bystrica, Slovakia	1st	58.05 m
2008	Olympic Games	Beijing, China	37th (q)	55.30 m
2009	Mediterranean Games	Pescara, Italy	3rd	59.08 m
2009	World Championships	Berlin, Germany	11th	57.57 m
2009	World Athletics Final	Thessaloniki, Greece	8th	56.12 m
2010	European Cup Winter Throwing	Arles, France	1st	65.96 m
2010	European Championships	Barcelona, Spain	7th	60.99 m
2011	World Championships	Daegu, South Korea	7th	61.65 m
2012	European Championships	Helsinki, Finland	21st (q)	51.69 m
2012	Olympic Games	London, United Kingdom	7th	61.62 m
2013	Mediterranean Games	Mersin, Turkey	1st	60.28 m
2013	World Championships	Moscow, Russia	20th (q)	57.95 m
2014	European Championships	Zürich, Switzerland	6th	61.58 m
2015	World Championships	Beijing, China	23rd (q)	59.76 m
2016	European Championships	Amsterdam, Netherlands	6th	60.65 m
2016	Olympic Games	Rio de Janeiro, Brazil	18th (q)	59.76 m
2017	World Championships	London, United Kingdom	9th	61.05 m
2018	European Championships	Berlin, Germany	4th	61.41 m
2019	World Championships	Doha, Qatar	10th	58.98 m
2022	European Championships	Munich, Germany	5th	59.36 m
2023	World Championships	Budapest, Hungary	29th (q)	54.41 m
2024	European Championships	Rome, Italy	16th (q)	56.34 m
