= Madara Sady Ndure =

Latvian javelin thrower

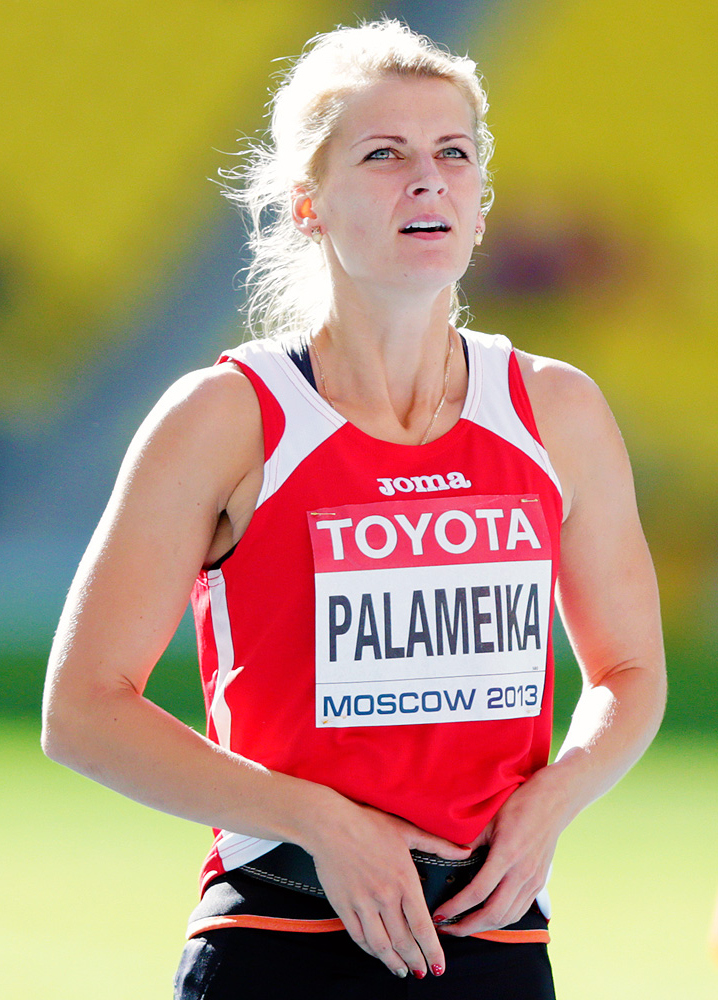
- Madara Palameika at the 2013 World Championships in Athletics in Moscow

Personal information
- Nationality: Latvian
- Born: Madara Palameika; 18 June 1987 (age 39) Talsi, Latvian SSR, Soviet Union
- Height: 1.83 m (6 ft 0 in)
- Weight: 76 kg (168 lb)

Sport
- Country: Latvia
- Sport: Track and field
- Event: Javelin throw
- Club: Talsu rajona SS, Latvijas šķēpa metēju klubs
- Coached by: Gints Palameika

Achievements and titles
- Personal best: NR 66.18 m (2016)

Madara Sady Ndure (previously known as Palameika) (born 18 June 1987) is a Latvian former track and field athlete who competed in the javelin throw. Her personal best of 66.18 m, set in 2016, is the Latvian record.

== Career ==
She won a bronze medal at the 2007 European Athletics U23 Championships in Debrecen, Hungary, with a throw of 57.07 metres. She then won a gold medal at the 2009 European Athletics U23 Championships in Kaunas, Lithuania, with a throw of 64.51 metres. She had a seventh place finish at the 2010 European Athletics Championships in Barcelona, Spain, with a best throw of 60.78 metres.

She had an eighth place finish at the 2012 European Athletics Championships in Helsinki, Finland, with a best throw of 56.82 metres. She finished in seventh place overall at the 2012 Olympic Games in London with a throw of 60.73 metres. Competing in Zurich, Switzerland, she had a fourth place finish at the 2014 European Athletics Championships with a best throw of 62.04 metres.

She had a seventh place finish at the 2016 European Athletics Championships in Amsterdam, Netherlands, with a best throw of 60.39 metres. She won the Brussels Diamond League event in September 2016 with a Latvian national record of 66.18m from her first throw, finishing ahead of double Olympic champion Barbora Spotakova of the Czech Republic, whose best was 63.78m.

At the beginning of 2024 she announced the end of her sporting career and her retirement from athletics. In total, she participated in five European Athletics Championships, with a best result of fourth place in Zurich in 2014. She also competed at six World Athletics Championships and three Olympic Games.

== International competitions ==
Year	Competition	Venue	Position	Notes
Representing Latvia
2005	European Junior Championships	Kaunas, Lithuania	17th (q)	45.43 m
2006	World Junior Championships	Beijing, China	16th (q)	46.34 m
2007	European U23 Championships	Debrecen, Hungary	3rd	57.07 m
2009	European U23 Championships	Kaunas, Lithuania	1st	64.51 m
2010	European Championships	Barcelona, Spain	8th	60.78 m
2011	World Championships	Daegu, South Korea	11th	58.08 m
2012	European Championships	Helsinki, Finland	8th	56.82 m
2012	Olympic Games	London, UK	8th	60.73 m
2013	World Championships	Moscow, Russia	27th (q)	53.70 m
2015	World Championships	Beijing, China	13th (q)	62.17 m
2016	European Championships	Amsterdam, Netherlands	7th	60.39 m
2016	Olympic Games	Rio de Janeiro, Brazil	10th	60.14 m
2017	World Championships	London, United Kingdom	21st (q)	59.54 m
2018	European Championships	Berlin, Germany	9th	57.98 m
2019	World Championships	Doha, Qatar	18th (q)	59.95 m
2021	Olympic Games	Tokyo, Japan	11th	58.70 m
2022	World Championships	Eugene, United States	13th (q)	58.61 m
2022	European Championships	Munich, Germany	9th	56.55 m
