= Anastasiya Svechnikova =

Uzbekistani javelin thrower (born 1992)

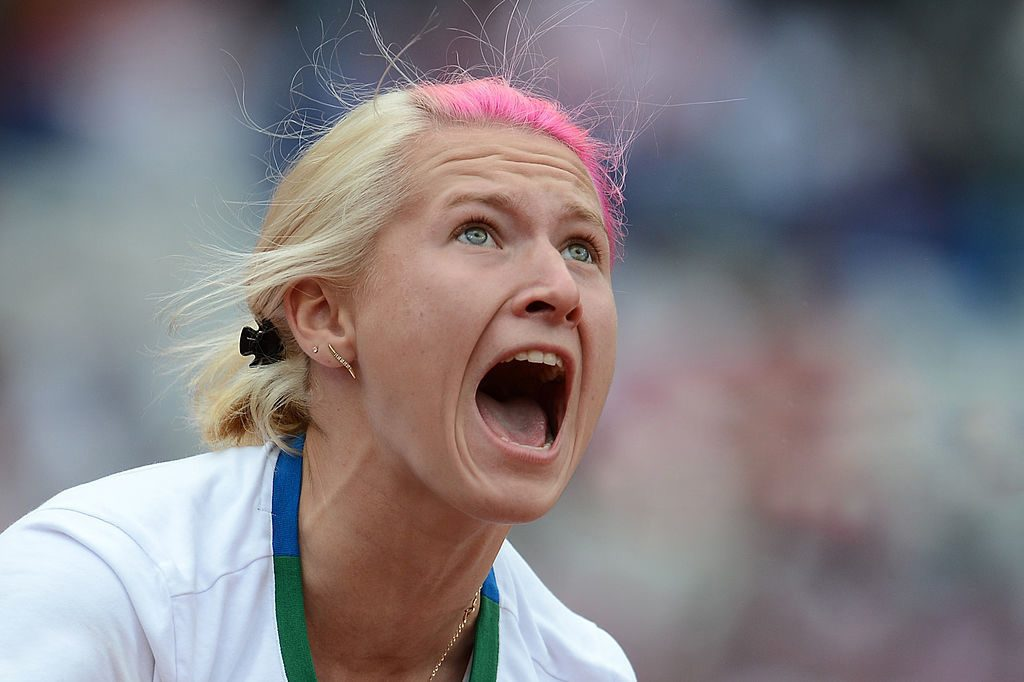

Personal information
- Born: September 20, 1992 (age 34) Tashkent, Uzbekistan
- Height: 1.69 m (5 ft 6 1/2 in)
- Weight: 68 kg (150 lb)

Sport
- Country: Uzbekistan
- Sport: Athletics
- Event: Javelin
- Updated on 11 August 2012

Anastasiya Vladimirovna Svechnikova (Zaitseva) (born 20 September 1992) is an Uzbekistani javelin thrower. Her personal best throw is 61.17 metres, achieved in April 2012 in Tashkent.

== Biography ==
She competed at the 2008 Olympic Games without reaching the final. At 15 years and 334 days she was the youngest track and field athlete competing at the 2008 Olympics.

Born in Tashkent, she finished twelfth at the 2007 World Youth Championships, ninth at the 2008 World Junior Championships and won the gold medal at the 2009 World Youth Championships. She won the gold medal at the 2010 Asian Junior Athletics Championships, beating Sui Liping to the title.

At the 2012 Olympic Games in London (Great Britain) she threw a 51.27 m javelin and took only eighteenth place in the qualification and left the tournament.

In 2017, she completed her sports career.
