= Sanni Utriainen =

Finnish javelin thrower (born 1991)

Personal information
- Born: 5 February 1991 (age 35) Nokia, Finland
- Height: 170 cm (5 ft 7 in)
- Weight: 64 kg (141 lb)

Sport
- Country: Finland
- Event: Javelin throw
- Club: Nokian Urheilijat; Tampereen Pyrintö
- Coached by: Esa Utriainen; Tero Järvenpää

Achievements and titles
- Personal best: Javelin: 63.03 (2015)
Medal record
World Junior Championships
Gold medal – first place	2010 Moncton	Javelin throw
- Updated on 10 August 2015

Sanni Marja Anniina Utriainen (born 5 February 1991) is a Finnish javelin thrower. She won gold at the 2010 World Junior Championships and competed in the 2012 Summer Olympics.

== Biography ==
Utriainen was born in Nokia, Finland on 5 February 1991. Her father, Esa Utriainen, was Finnish champion in men's javelin throw in 1979 and represented Finland at the 1983 World Championships. Sanni Utriainen first broke 50 metres in 2008, throwing 51.89 m at the Pihtipudas Javelin Carnival and winning the Finnish youth championship with 51.00 m. In 2009, she placed ninth at the European Junior Championships in Novi Sad, throwing 51.25 m in the qualification and 48.45 m in the final.

At the 2010 World Junior Championships in Moncton Utriainen won gold, throwing a personal best 56.69 m on her final attempt to overtake Latvia's Līna Mūze by five centimetres. Later that summer she won gold at the Finnish championships in Kajaani, throwing 56.29 m for her first (and, as of 2015, only) national senior title; she also won at the Finland-Sweden Athletics International, setting a new personal best of 57.26 m.

In the following years Utriainen's results stagnated; although she improved her personal best in each of 2011, 2012 and 2013, the improvements were only minor, and she didn't reach the international elite. Her best throw in 2012, 59.31 m, was a Finnish under-23 record and exceeded the B standard for the Olympics in London; she was selected for the Olympics, but went out in the qualifying round, not registering a valid mark on any of her three attempts. In 2013, she improved her national under-23 record by four centimetres to 59.35 m. She missed the 2014 season almost entirely due to an elbow injury.

Utriainen broke 60 metres for the first time in June 2015 in Lappeenranta, throwing 60.08 m. At the 2015 national championships in early August she only managed 57.59 m and placed second behind Oona Sormunen, but the following week she threw 63.03 m in Kuortane, improving her personal best by almost three metres and exceeding the qualifying standard for the World Championships in Beijing.

=== Coaching ===
Utriainen is coached by her father Esa. Former javelin thrower Tero Järvenpää became her secondary coach in 2015.
