= Tatjana Jelača =

Serbian javelin thrower

Personal information
- Nationality: Serbian
- Born: 10 August 1990 (age 35) Sremska Mitrovica, SR Serbia, Yugoslavia
- Height: 1.79 m (5 ft 10 1/2 in)
- Weight: 85 kg (187 lb)

Sport
- Country: Serbia
- Sport: Athletics / Track and field
- Event: Javelin
- Club: AK Sirmijum

Achievements and titles
- Personal best: Javelin - 64.21 m
Medal record
Representing Serbia
European Championships
Silver medal – second place	2014 Zürich	Javelin throw
Mediterranean Games
Silver medal – second place	2013 Mersin	Javelin throw
World Junior Championships
Bronze medal – third place	2008 Bydgoszcz	Javelin throw
European Junior Championships
Gold medal – first place	2009 Novi Sad	Javelin throw
European Youth Olympic Festival
Gold medal – first place	2007 Belgrade	Javelin throw

Tatjana Mirković (Serbian Cyrillic: Татјана Мирковић; née Jelača / Јелача, born 10 August 1990) is a Serbian javelin thrower. A two-time Olympian having competed at the Summer Olympics of 2008 and 2012, Mirković won the silver medal at the 2014 European Athletics Championships. She also extended the Serbian national record in her event numerous times.

== Career ==
=== Early career ===
As a member of Sirmijum Athletics Club, Jelača won the gold medal at the 2007 European Youth Olympic Festival, throwing the javelin 51.80 metres to set a senior Serbian national record in the event.

In July 2008, Jelača won a bronze medal at the 2008 World Junior Championships in Bydgoszcz, Poland. Her result of 58.77 metres set another new senior national record in the process. She also competed at the 2008 Beijing Olympics, where she failed to record a valid distance and did not reach the final round.

In July 2009, Jelača set another new senior national record in the javelin with a throw of 60.35 metres to take the gold medal at the 2009 European Junior Championships in Novi Sad, Serbia. At the end of the year, she received the Sport award for the best Serbian young athlete in 2009.

=== Senior career ===
At the 2010 European Championships in Barcelona, Jelača reached the final with a throw in qualifying of 56.89 metres, which was 9th best overall. In the final itself, her best mark was 52.13 metres, which gave her 12th place.

At the 2012 European Championships in Helsinki she won a 7th place after setting her season's best effort of 57.58 metres. In August of that year she competed in London at the 2012 Olympic Games, although her performance in the qualifying round was insufficient to advance to the final.

In the June 2013 Mediterranean Games, Jelača threw the javelin 57.88 metres and took a silver medal at the event behind Martina Ratej of Slovenia. Jelača made a breakthrough in her senior career in qualifications of the 2013 World Championship two months later, when she threw a new national record of 62.68 metres. She came 9th in the final with a best effort of 60.81 metres.

She won her first senior medal, silver at the 2014 European Championship with a huge personal best which also set a new national record of 64.21 metres.

== Personal life ==
In March 2015, Tatjana Jelača took the surname Mirković after marrying her fiancé Bojan Mirković. Their son Nikola was born in September 2015 in Frankfurt, Germany.

== Personal bests ==
Event	Performance	Date	Location	Notes
Javelin throw	64.21 m	14 August 2014	Zürich, Switzerland	NR

Awards
Preceded by Ivana Španović	The Best Young Athlete of Serbia; 2009	Succeeded by Olivera and Nikolina Moldovan
