= Vanda Juhász =

Hungarian javelin thrower

Vanda Juhász (born 6 June 1989 in Dunaújváros) is a Hungarian javelin thrower. She competed in the javelin throw event at the 2012 Summer Olympics. Her personal best is 59.31 m, set in 2012 in Szekszárd.
