= Vera Rebrik =

Russian track and field athlete (born 1989)

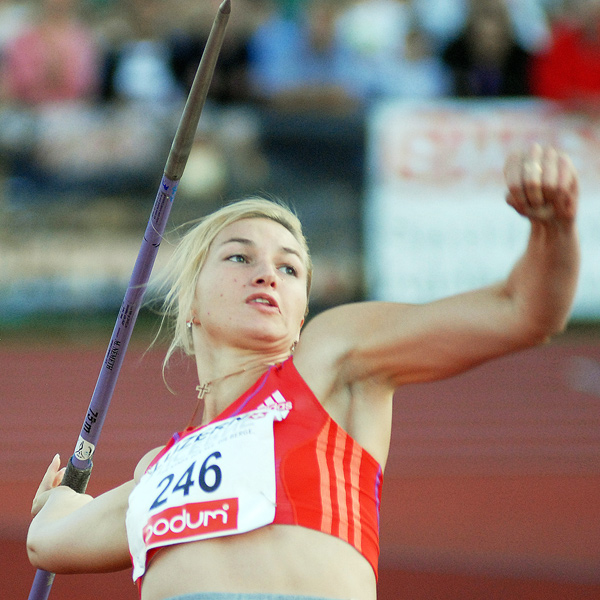
- Rebrik, 2012 Spitzen Leichtathletik Luzern

Personal information
- Full name: Vera Yuryevna Rebrik
- Nationality: Ukraine (until 2014); Russia (since 2015)
- Born: 25 February 1989 (age 37) Yalta, Crimean Oblast, Ukrainian SSR, USSR
- Height: 1.75 m (5 ft 9 in)
- Weight: 65 kg (143 lb)

Sport
- Country: Ukraine & Russia
- Sport: Women's athletics
- Event: Javelin throw

Achievements and titles
- Personal best: 67.30 m (2016)
Medal record
European Championships
Gold medal – first place	2012 Helsinki	Javelin throw
European Cup Winter Throwing
Silver medal – second place	2013 Leiria	Javelin throw
Summer Universiade
Silver medal – second place	2009 Belgrade	Javelin throw
- Updated on 08 August 2012

Vera Yuryevna Rebrik (Russian: Вера Юрьевна Ребрик; Ukrainian: Віра Юріївна Ребрик; born 25 February 1989) is a Russian track and field athlete who competes in the javelin throw. Her personal best throw is 67.30 metres, achieved at the Russian Championships in Adler. She also holds the world under-20 record of 63.01 metres.

From Yalta, Crimea, she competed for Ukraine until 2014, after which she transferred her eligibility to Russia, following the annexation of Crimea by the Russian Federation.

Due to Russia currently being suspended from all international athletic competitions, Rebrik participates as a neutral athlete.

== International competitions ==
Year	Competition	Venue	Position	Notes
Representing Ukraine
2005	World Youth Championships	Marrakesh, Morocco	2nd	56.16 m
2006	World Junior Championships	Beijing, China	2nd	57.79 m
2007	European Junior Championships	Hengelo, Netherlands	1st	58.48 m
2008	World Junior Championships	Bydgoszcz, Poland	1st	63.01 m
2008	Olympic Games	Beijing, China	16th (q)	59.05 m
2009	Universiade	Belgrade, Serbia	2nd	61.02 m
2009	European U23 Championships	Kaunas, Lithuania	2nd	61.43 m
2009	World Championships	Berlin, Germany	9th	58.25 m
2010	European Championships	Barcelona, Spain	17th (q)	52.31 m
2011	European U23 Championships	Ostrava, Czech Republic	2nd	58.95 m
2011	Universiade	Shenzhen, China	4th	58.25 m
2011	World Championships	Daegu, South Korea	16th (q)	58.50 m
2012	European Championships	Helsinki, Finland	1st	66.86 m
2012	Olympic Games	London, United Kingdom	19th (q)	58.97 m
2013	World Championships	Moscow, Russia	11th	58.33 m
Representing Russia
2015	World Championships	Beijing, China	24th (q)	59.67 m
Competing as Authorised Neutral Athletes
2017	World Championships	London, United Kingdom	–	NM

== See also ==
- List of European Athletics Championships medalists (women)
