= 2007 European Athletics Junior Championships =

- Dates: 19–22 July
- Host city: Hengelo, Netherlands
- Venue: FBK-Stadium
- Level: Under 20
- Events: 44
- Records set: 1 EJR, 4 CRs

The 19th European Athletics Junior Championships were held between 19 and 22 July 2007 at the FBK-Stadium in Hengelo, in the eastern Netherlands.

== Medal summary ==
=== Men ===
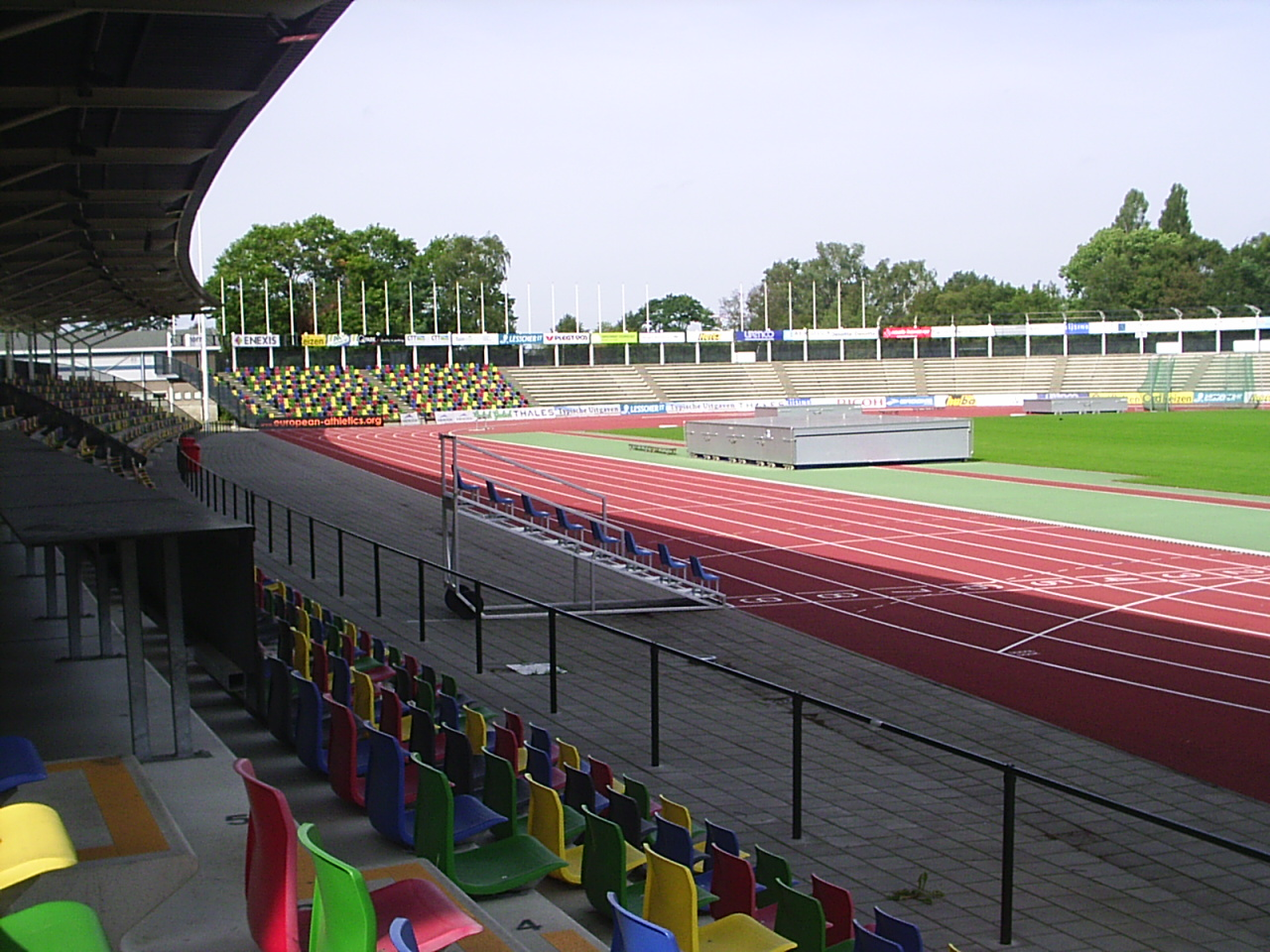
Host stadium in Hengelo

Event	Gold		Silver		Bronze	
100 m	Julian Reus; Germany	10.38	Yannick Lesourd; France	10.53	Giuseppe Aita; Italy	10.57
200 m	Alexander Nelson; Great Britain	20.83	Julian Reus; Germany	20.87 PB	Luke Fagan; Great Britain	21.08
400 m	Yannick Fonsat; France	46.34 PB	Marcin Kłaczański; Poland	46.46 PB	Eric Kruger; Germany	46.49 PB
400 m	National junior records were established in the final for Ukraine and Latvia.					
800 m	Robin Schembera; Germany	1:47.98	James Brewer; Great Britain	1:48.08	Adam Kszczot; Poland	1:48.10 PB
1500 m	Mario Scapini; Italy	4:01.31	Victor Corrales; Spain	4:01.44	Merihun Crespi; Italy	4:01.83
5000 m	Mourad Amdouni; France	14:08.27	Mohamed Elbendir; Spain	14:14.79	Dmytro Lashyn; Ukraine	14:15.26
10 000 m	Dmytro Lashyn; Ukraine	29:51.58 PB	Matti Markowski; Germany	30:10.75 PB	Roman Pozdyaykin; Russia	30:13.70
110 m H	Artur Noga; Poland	13.36 =CR	Vladimir Zhukov; Russia	13.46 =NJ	Gianni Frankis; Great Britain	13.47 =PB
110 m H	National junior records were also established in the heats for Portugal and Hungary.					
400 m H	Silvio Schirrmeister; Germany	50.60 PB	Vyacheslav Sakayev; Russia	50.72 PB	Toby Ulm; Great Britain	50.99 PB
3000 m St.	Jakub Holuša; Czech Republic	8:50.30 PB	Alexandru Ghinea; Romania	8:50.42 PB	Carlos Alonso; Spain	8:50.95 PB
10000 m track walk	Sergey Morozov; Russia	40:02.88 PB	Matteo Giupponi; Italy	40:54.88 PB	Lluis Torla; Spain	41:06.32 PB
10000 m track walk	A national junior record was established for France.					
4 × 100 m	Germany; Rouven Christ; Julian Reus; Robert Hering; Markus Brandt	39.81	Great Britain; Funmi Sobodu; Alexander Nelson; Luke Fagan; Leevan Yearwood	39.83	France; Charles Figaro; Yannick Lesourd; Frederic Mignot; Nyls Nubret	40.21
4 × 400 m	Great Britain; Nigel Levine; Robert Davis; Louis Persent; Jordan McGrath	3:08.21	Germany; Pascal Nabow; Eric Kruger; Thomas Schneider; Robin Schembera	3:08.64	France; Bruno Naprix; Mickael François; Jean-Patrick Rolland; Yannick Fonsat	3:09.19
4 × 400 m	The Polish team crossed the line in first place but were later disqualified for an infringement.					
High jump	Oleksandr Nartov; Ukraine	2.23	Andriy Protsenko; Ukraine	2.21 PB	Raúl Spank; Germany	2.21
High jump	A national junior record was established in the final for Lithuania.					
Pole vault	Leonid Kivalov; Russia	5.60 =CR	Yevgeni Ageyev; Russia	5.50 PB	Łukasz Michalski; Poland	5.45
Pole vault	One of the favorites, Raphael Holzdeppe of Germany with a season best of 5.50 metres, exited in the qualification after failing his starting height of 5.10 metres.					
Long jump	Olivier Huet; France	7.78	Ivan Slepov; Russia	7.61	Marcos Caldeira; Portugal	7.58
Triple jump	Lyukman Adams; Russia	16.50	Ilya Yefremov; Russia	16.49	Dzmitry Platnitski; Belarus	16.49 PB
Shot put 6 kg	Aleksandr Bulanov; Russia	19.95 PB	Antonio Vital E Silva; Portugal	19.66	Nikola Kišanić; Croatia	19.63 =PB
Shot put 6 kg	A national junior record was established in qualification for Greece.					
Discus 1,75 kg	Nikolay Sedyuk; Russia	62.72 CR NJR	Ivan Hryshyn; Ukraine	62.28	Joni Mattila; Finland	58.05
Hammer 6 kg	Arno Laitinen; Finland	71.94	Adrian Pop; Romania	70.80	Siarhei Tsytsoryn; Belarus	70.23
Javelin	Matthias de Zordo; Germany	78.59	Roman Avramenko; Ukraine	75.24	Thomas Smet; Belgium	72.56
Javelin	A national junior record was established in qualification for Ukraine.					
Decathlon	Matthias Prey; Germany	7908	Rok Deržanič; Slovenia	7560	Rico Freimuth; Germany	7524
WR world record | AR area record | CR championship record | GR games record | NR national record | OR Olympic record | PB personal best | SB season best | WL world leading (in a given season)

=== Women ===
Event	Gold		Silver		Bronze	
100 m	Ezinne Okparaebo; Norway	11.45 NJR	Inna Eftimova; Bulgaria	11.52	Kateřina Čechová; Czech Republic	11.58
100 m	A national junior record was also established in the heats for the Czech Republic.					
200 m	Hayley Jones; Great Britain	23.37 PB	Yelizaveta Bryzhina; Ukraine	23.66	Inna Eftimova; Bulgaria	23.78
400 m	Danijela Grgić; Croatia	52.45	Kseniya Ustalova; Russia	52.92	Olga Fomina; Russia	53.68
800 m	Mirela Lavric; Romania	2:02.84 PB	Emma Jackson; Great Britain	2:03.23	Machteld Mulder; Netherlands	2:03.72 PB
1500 m	Cristina Vasiloiu; Romania	4:15.30	Stephanie Twell; Great Britain	4:16.03	Daniela Donisa; Romania	4:18.19
3000 m	Cristina Vasiloiu; Romania	9:13.51	Natalya Popkova; Russia	9:14.17	Daniela Donisa; Romania	9:14.54
5000 m	Natalya Popkova; Russia	16:08.95	Ingunn Opsal; Norway	16:14.59	Emily Pidgeon; Great Britain	16:31.30
5000 m	A national junior record was established in the heats for Ireland.					
3000 m St.	Karoline Bjerkeli Grøvdal; Norway	9:44.34 EJR CR	Kristine Eikrem Engeset; Norway	9:47.35	Poļina Jeļizarova; Latvia	10:03.91
100 m H	Aleksandra Fedoriva; Russia	13.12 NJR	Laetitia Denis; France	13.35 PB	Marina Andryukhina; Russia	13.50 =PB
400 m H	Fabienne Kohlmann; Germany	56.42 PB	Perri Shakes-Drayton; Great Britain	56.46 NJR	Anastasiya Ott; Russia	57.27
10,000 m track walk	Anisya Kornikova; Russia	43:27.20 PB	Yelena Shumkina; Russia	46:24.74	Alena Kostromitina; Russia	46:41.56 PB
4 × 100 m	Great Britain; Anike Shand-Whittingham; Ashleigh Nelson; Hayley Jones; Asha Philip	44.52	Ukraine; Hanna Titimets; Nataliya Pohrebnyak; Hanna Yaroshchuk; Yelizaveta Bryzhina	44.77	Poland; Martyna Książek; Marika Popowicz; Agnieszka Ceglarek; Weronika Wedler	45.32
4 × 400 m	Russia; Olga Fomina; Anastasiya Ott; Anna Verkhovskaya; Kseniya Ustalova	3:33.95	Great Britain; Meghan Beesley; Hayley Jones; Joey Duck; Perri Shakes-Drayton	3:37.29	Germany; Wiebke Ullmann; Esther Cremer; Lena Schmidt; Fabienne Kohlmann	3:37.32
High jump	Erika Wiklund; Sweden	1.82	Liene Karsuma; Latvia	1.82 PB	Mirela Demireva; Bulgaria	1.82
Pole vault	Minna Nikkanen; Finland	4.35 NJR	Christina Michel; Germany	4.25	Anna Katharina Schmid; Switzerland	4.25
Pole vault	A national junior record was established in the final for Poland.					
Long jump	Manuela Galtier; France	6.44 PB	Eloyse Lesueur; France	6.34	Yuliya Pidluzhnaya; Russia	6.28
Triple jump	Kaire Leibak; Estonia	14.02	Hanna Knyazheva; Ukraine	13.85 PB	Cristina Bujin; Romania	13.57
Shot put	Melissa Boekelman; Netherlands	16.51	Alena Kopets; Belarus	16.10 =PB	Isabell Von Loga; Germany	15,74
Discus	Vera Karmishina; Russia	56.16 PB	Sandra Perković; Croatia	55.42 PB	Tamara Apostolico; Italy	52.21 PB
Hammer	Bianca Perie; Romania	64.35	Kateřina Šafránková; Czech Republic	62.95	Natallia Shayunova; Belarus	62.73
Javelin	Vira Rebryk; Ukraine	58.48	Sinta Ozoliņa; Latvia	57.01 NR	Urszula Kuncewicz; Poland	54.83 NJR
Heptathlon	Aiga Grabuste; Latvia	5920	Eliška Klučinová; Czech Republic	5709	Nikola Ogrodníková; Czech Republic	5607
WR world record | AR area record | CR championship record | GR games record | NR national record | OR Olympic record | PB personal best | SB season best | WL world leading (in a given season)

== Medal table ==
* Host nation (Netherlands)

Rank	Nation	Gold	Silver	Bronze	Total
1	Russia	10	8	6	24
2	Germany	7	5	4	16
3	Great Britain	4	6	4	14
4	France	4	3	2	9
5	Romania	4	2	3	9
6	Ukraine	3	6	1	10
7	Norway	2	2	0	4
8	Finland	2	0	1	3
9	Czech Republic	1	2	2	5
10	Latvia	1	2	1	4
11	Poland	1	1	4	6
12	Italy	1	1	3	5
13	Croatia	1	1	1	3
14	Netherlands*	1	0	1	2
15	Estonia	1	0	0	1
15	Sweden	1	0	0	1
17	Spain	0	2	2	4
18	Belarus	0	1	3	4
19	Bulgaria	0	1	2	3
20	Portugal	0	1	1	2
21	Slovenia	0	1	0	1
22	Belgium	0	0	1	1
22	Switzerland	0	0	1	1
Totals (23 entries)		44	45	43	132

== See also ==
- 2007 in athletics (track and field)
