= 2024 African Championships in Athletics – Women's javelin throw =

Women's javelin throw at the 2024 African Championships in Athletics
- Venue: Japoma Stadium
- Location: Douala, Cameroon
- Dates: 25 June
- Competitors: 10 from 9 nations
- Winning distance: 57.03 m

Medalists
gold medal	Jo-Ane van Dyk	South Africa
silver medal	Jana van Schalkwyk	South Africa
bronze medal	Josephine Lalam	Uganda

The women's javelin throw event at the 2024 African Championships in Athletics was held on 25 June in Douala, Cameroon.

== Records ==
Records before the 2024 African Athletics Championships
Record	Athlete (nation)	Distance (m)	Location	Date
World record	Barbora Špotáková (CZE)	72.28	Stuttgart, Germany	13 September 2008
African record	Sunette Viljoen (RSA)	69.35	New York City, United States	9 June 2012
Championship record	Sunette Viljoen (RSA)	65.32	Marrakesh, Morocco	13 August 2014
World leading	Flor Ruiz (COL)	66.70	Cuiabá, Brazil	12 May 2024
African leading	Jo-Ané van Dyk (RSA)	63.57	Offenburg, Germany	12 May 2024

== Results ==
Rank	Athlete	Nationality	#1	#2	#3	#4	#5	#6	Result	Notes
1st place, gold medalist(s)	Jo-Ane van Dyk	South Africa	54.35	57.03	51.67	52.76	56.52	56.53	57.03	
2nd place, silver medalist(s)	Jana van Schalkwyk	South Africa	47.68	52.33	51.93	51.81	55.14	51.69	55.14	
3rd place, bronze medalist(s)	Josephine Lalam	Uganda	x	52.26	52.20	x	53.57	52.69	53.57	
~~4~~	Arianne Duarte Morais	Cape Verde	~~50.29~~	~~51.06~~	~~52.70~~	~~48.91~~	~~47.24~~	~~52.60~~	~~52.70~~	DQ
4	Selma Rosun	Mauritius	49.41	x	47.76	x	46.36	46.53	49.41	
5	Victoria Kparika Effiom	Nigeria	x	47.05	46.26	46.41	49.15	46.85	49.15	
6	Dingete Adola	Ethiopia	49.06	47.56	43.65	43.48	43.14	42.60	49.06	
7	Rejoice Agbewodie	Ghana	x	48.98	46.13	44.81	x	x	48.98	
8	Damacline Mwango Nyekereri	Kenya	43.77	44.43	44.51				44.51	
9	Bizunesh Tadesse	Ethiopia	43.01	40.29	x				43.01	
10	Adèle Mafogang	Cameroon	33.52	x	38.72				38.72	

== See also ==
- Athletics at the 2023 African Games – Women's javelin throw
