= 2012 African Championships in Athletics – Women's javelin throw =

The women's javelin throw at the 2012 African Championships in Athletics was held at the Stade Charles de Gaulle on 30 June.

== Medalists ==
Gold	Margaret Simpson; Ghana
Silver	Justine Robbeson; South Africa
Bronze	Gerlize de Klerk; South Africa

== Records ==
Standing records prior to the 2012 African Championships in Athletics
World record	Barbora Špotáková (CZE)	72.28	Stuttgart, Germany	13 September 2008
African record	Sunette Viljoen (RSA)	69.35	New York City, United States	9 June 2012
Championship record	Sunette Viljoen (RSA)	63.33	Nairobi, Kenya	31 July 2010

== Schedule ==
Date	Time	Round
30 June 2012	16:20	Final

== Results ==
=== Final ===
Rank	Athlete	Nationality	#1	#2	#3	#5	#5	#6	Result	Notes
1st place, gold medalist(s)	Margaret Simpson	Ghana	x	53.22	53.18	51.40	52.63	54.62	54.62	
2nd place, silver medalist(s)	Justine Robbeson	South Africa	48.49	47.48	52.40	50.05	51.06	52.81	52.81	
3rd place, bronze medalist(s)	Gerlize de Klerk	South Africa	x	49.85	46.50	46.46	47.44	48.23	49.85	
4	Zuta Mary Nartey	Ghana	43.47	43.29	45.21	46.87	49.69	47.73	49.69	
5	Adjimon Adanhoegbe	Benin	40.05	x	40.79	40.80	46.22	46.32	46.32	NR
6	Selma Rosun	Mauritius	40.51	43.64	40.42	44.96	45.93	43.82	45.93	
7	Bernadette Ravina	Mauritius	45.19	x	44.98	44.98	45.46	43.55	45.46	
8	Gebremichael Gerase	Ethiopia	43.96	42.15	40.23	41.10	41.10	x	43.96	
	Mamina Soura	Burkina Faso							DNS	
	Sunette Viljoen	South Africa							DNS	
