= Aseel Osama Abdel Hamid =

Egyptian javelin thrower )

Personal information
- Born: 17 April 2008 (age 18)

Sport
- Sport: Athletics
- Event: Javelin throw
Medal record
Representing Egypt
African Championships
Gold medal – first place	2026 Accra	Javelin throw
World U20 Championships
Gold medal – first place	2026 Eugene	Javelin throw

Aseel Osama Abdel Hamid (born 17 April 2008) is an Egyptian javelin thrower. She was the African champion in 2026 at the age of 18 years-old, setting an African under-20 record.

== Biography ==
In April 2026, she won the senior javelin throw title at the Egyptian Championships with a throw of 56.10 metres. As an 18-year-old the following month, she won the gold medal in the javelin at the 2026 African Championships in Athletics in Accra with a second-round throw of 60.97m to win ahead of Arianne Duarte Morais and Jana van Schalkwyk. The throw set a new African under-20 record. In August, she also won the gold medal representing Egypt at the 2026 World Athletics U20 Championships in the United States.
