= 2022 African Championships in Athletics – Women's javelin throw =

The women's javelin throw event at the 2022 African Championships in Athletics was held on 11 June in Port Louis, Mauritius.

== Results ==
Rank	Athlete	Nationality	#1	#2	#3	#4	#5	#6	Result	Notes
1st place, gold medalist(s)	Jo-Ane van Dyk	South Africa	x	59.37	56.38	56.59	60.65	55.00	60.65	
2nd place, silver medalist(s)	Mckyla van der Westhuizen	South Africa	51.85	x	52.29	51.48	55.55	52.94	55.55	
3rd place, bronze medalist(s)	Jana van Schalkwyk	South Africa	47.29	48.50	48.59	50.22	51.08	54.49	54.49	
4	Martha Musai	Kenya	47.63	44.76	x	50.57	x	50.76	50.76	
5	Josephine Lalam	Uganda	47.69	47.92	46.72	44.97	49.11	48.06	49.11	
6	Dengate Adola	Ethiopia	45.24	45.12	x	44.10	47.43	45.85	47.43	
7	Jessika Rosun	Mauritius	45.37	45.61	45.84	44.05	42.98	–	45.84	
