= 2024 World Athletics U20 Championships – Women's javelin throw =

Women's javelin throw at the 2024 World Athletics U20 Championships
- Venue: Estadio Atlético de la VIDENA
- Dates: 28 August 2024 (qualification); 30 August 2024 (final)
- Competitors: 25 from 20 nations
- Winning distance: 63.05 m

Medalists
gold medal	Yan Ziyi	China
silver medal	Chu Pin-hsun	Chinese Taipei
bronze medal	Evelyn Bliss	United States

The women's javelin throw at the 2024 World Athletics U20 Championships was held at the Estadio Atlético de la VIDENA in Lima, Peru on 28 and 30 August 2024.

== Records ==
U20 standing records prior to the 2024 World Athletics U20 Championships were as follows:

Record	Athlete & Nationality	Mark	Location	Date
World U20 Record	Yan Ziyi (CHN)	64.28	Hangzhou, China	14 April 2024
Championship Record	Adriana Vilagoš (SRB)	63.52	Cali, Colombia	2 August 2022
World U20 Leading	Yan Ziyi (CHN)	64.28	Hangzhou, China	14 April 2024

== Results ==
=== Qualification ===
Athletes attaining a mark of at least 53.00 metres (Q) or at least the 12 best performers (q) qualified for the final.

==== Group A ====
Rank	Athlete	Nation	Round			Mark	Notes
Rank	Athlete	Nation	1	2	3	Mark	Notes
1	Mirja Lukas	Germany	47.78	56.76		56.76	Q
2	Sabrina Boss	Switzerland	52.30	50.60	–	52.30	q
3	Ayesha Jones	Great Britain	46.68	47.37	51.78	51.78	q, PB
4	Rebecca Nelimarkka	Finland	44.63	47.67	51.49	51.49	q
5	Elza Lazdiņa	Latvia	49.11	47.43	42.23	49.11	q
6	Alysa Keller	United States	48.83	48.03	x	48.83	q
7	Inga Rabben Reimers (Note: Inga Rabben Reimers did not originally qualify for the final however due to Lorena Frühn of Heat 2 opting to take no further part in the competition Reimers was substituted in.)	Norway	x	47.76	48.52	48.52	
8	Alva Back	Sweden	47.93	41.96	48.15	48.15	
9	Wu Yumeng	China	42.36	48.08	44.64	48.08	
10	Nozomi Sakurai	Japan	x	45.31	x	45.31	
11	Taysha Stubbs	Bahamas	44.28	43.09	37.24	44.28	
12	Viktoriia Derkach	Poland	x	43.76	x	43.76	

==== Group B ====
Rank	Athlete	Nation	Round			Mark	Notes
Rank	Athlete	Nation	1	2	3	Mark	Notes
1	Yan Ziyi	China	55.67			55.67	Q
2	Vita Barbić	Croatia	x	49.03	52.54	52.54	q
3	Evelyn Bliss	United States	41.55	50.92	x	50.92	q
4	Chu Pin-hsun	Chinese Taipei	47.17	49.13	50.75	50.75	q
5	Leonie Hügli	Switzerland	50.49	47.14	47.28	50.49	q
6	Lorena Frühn	Germany	47.65	46.42	49.90	49.90	q
7	Camilla Colstrup	Denmark	47.17	48.03	x	48.03	
8	Cecilia Österberg	Finland	47.37	x	46.85	47.37	
9	Kim Min-ji	South Korea	41.73	45.42	46.74	46.74	
10	Orinta Navikaitė	Lithuania	44.98	x	44.64	44.98	
11	Heti Väät	Estonia	40.85	43.86	42.17	43.86	
12	Hashly Geisete Ayovi	Ecuador	x	42.25	42.00	42.25	
13	Vanessa Oriaku	Romania	x	x	40.37	40.37	

=== Final ===
Rank	Athlete	Nation	Round						Mark	Notes
Rank	Athlete	Nation	1	2	3	4	5	6	Mark	Notes
1st place, gold medalist(s)	Yan Ziyi	China	60.10	x	60.31	63.05	60.44	–	63.05	
2nd place, silver medalist(s)	Chu Pin-hsun	Chinese Taipei	51.66	54.28	52.55	51.84	52.92	50.47	54.28	
3rd place, bronze medalist(s)	Evelyn Bliss	United States	49.58	x	54.01	x	x	52.07	54.01	
4	Vita Barbić	Croatia	50.51	53.24	50.23	53.54	49.73	x	53.54	
5	Rebecca Nelimarkka	Finland	46.95	51.74	53.00	50.99	52.35	51.43	53.00	
6	Mirja Lukas	Germany	51.84	x	49.68	x	x	51.13	51.84	
7	Sabrina Boss	Switzerland	49.71	49.33	48.76	49.33	49.56	47.91	49.71	
8	Inga Rabben Reimers	Norway	49.61	x	46.48	45.98	47.77	x	49.61	
9	Ayesha Jones	Great Britain	47.08	44.16	49.37				49.37	
10	Leonie Hügli	Switzerland	46.67	47.29	47.32				47.32	
11	Elza Lazdiņa	Latvia	46.62	40.92	46.24				46.62	
12	Alysa Keller	United States	45.84	x	45.43				45.43	
