= 2016 IAAF World U20 Championships – Women's javelin throw =

The women's javelin throw event at the 2016 IAAF World U20 Championships was held in Bydgoszcz, Poland, at Zdzisław Krzyszkowiak Stadium on 19 and 20 July.

== Medalists ==
Gold	Klaudia Maruszewska; Poland
Silver	Jo-Ane van Dyk; South Africa
Bronze	Eda Tuğsuz; Turkey

== Results ==
=== Final ===
20 July

Rank	Name	Nationality	Attempts				Result	Notes
Rank	Name	Nationality	1	2	3	4	Result	Notes
1st place, gold medalist(s)	Klaudia Maruszewska	Poland	57.59	55.67	x	–	57.59	PB
2nd place, silver medalist(s)	Jo-Ane van Dyk	South Africa	53.68	53.61	57.32	55.71	57.32	PB
3rd place, bronze medalist(s)	Eda Tuğsuz	Turkey	54.21	x	56.71	54.17	56.71	
4	Nikol Tabačková	Czech Republic	51.50	54.07	56.19	52.16	56.19	PB
5	Chang Chu	Chinese Taipei	55.35	x	x	51.88	55.35	NU20R
6	Mikako Yamashita	Japan	54.89	43.87	48.27	x	54.89	SB
7	Geraldine Ruckstuhl	Switzerland	47.65	50.78	53.38		53.38	PB
8	Haruka Kitaguchi	Japan	50.71	52.15	51.26		52.15	
9	Marisleisys Duarthe	Cuba	47.83	51.46	49.59		51.46	
10	Hanna Tarasiuk	Belarus	50.12	x	51.05		51.05	
11	Mirell Luik	Estonia	49.03	50.19	50.65		50.65	
12	Ilaria Casarotto	Italy	x	x	50.17		50.17	

=== Qualifications ===
19 July
With qualifying standard of 53.50 (Q) or at least the 12 best performers (q) advance to the Final

==== Summary ====
Rank	Name	Nationality	Result	Notes
1	Eda Tuğsuz	Turkey	57.77	Q
2	Hanna Tarasiuk	Belarus	56.40	Q PB
3	Haruka Kitaguchi	Japan	56.16	Q
4	Chang Chu	Chinese Taipei	54.65	Q PB
5	Klaudia Maruszewska	Poland	54.34	Q PB
6	Jo-Ane van Dyk	South Africa	54.06	Q
7	Mikako Yamashita	Japan	53.47	q
8	Geraldine Ruckstuhl	Switzerland	52.50	q PB
9	Nikol Tabačková	Czech Republic	52.45	q
10	Ilaria Casarotto	Italy	52.42	q PB
11	Marisleisys Duarthe	Cuba	52.32	q
12	Mirell Luik	Estonia	52.23	q
13	Fabienne Schonig	Germany	51.98	
14	Brittni Wolczyk	Canada	51.69	
15	Luisa Sinigaglia	Italy	51.02	
16	Kathryn Brooks	Australia	50.54	
17	Luz Mariana Castro	Mexico	50.19	
18	Emma Oosterwegel	Netherlands	49.73	
19	Lee Ga-hui	South Korea	49.46	
20	Estefany Chacón	Venezuela	48.81	
21	Chen Jiajia	China	48.53	
22	Alexanda Maria da Silva	Brazil	48.31	
23	Stella Weinberg	Norway	48.29	
24	Laine Donāne	Latvia	48.24	
25	Afroditi Maniou	Greece	48.23	
25	Ashley Pryke	Canada	48.15	
27	Claudia Ferreira	Portugal	48.09	
28	Candesha Scott	Grenada	47.86	
29	Sanobarhon Erkinova	Uzbekistan	47.84	
30	Azize Altın	Turkey	47.79	
31	Agnese Vilcāne	Latvia	47.64	
32	Katelyn Gochenour	United States	47.53	
33	Yu Yuzhen	China	46.99	
34	Emma Fitzgerald	United States	46.28	
35	Varvara Nazarova	Kazakhstan	46.17	
36	Marcella Liiv	Estonia	45.01	
37	Anastasiia Ivanova	Ukraine	44.92	
38	Ioana Valentina Plavan	Romania	44.28	
39	Dina Ćosić	Serbia	42.84	
40	Jeong Ji-hye	South Korea	42.11	
41	Annika Marie Fuchs	Germany	37.60	
42	Shanee Angol	Dominica	36.67	
	Kelechi Nwanaga	Nigeria	DNS	

==== Details ====
With qualifying standard of 53.50 (Q) or at least the 12 best performers (q) advance to the Final

===== Group A =====
19 July

Rank	Name	Nationality	Attempts			Result	Notes
Rank	Name	Nationality	1	2	3	Result	Notes
1	Eda Tuğsuz	Turkey	x	45.91	57.77	57.77	Q
2	Hanna Tarasiuk	Belarus	56.40			56.40	Q PB
3	Chang Chu	Chinese Taipei	46.30	50.47	54.65	54.65	Q PB
4	Klaudia Maruszewska	Poland	54.34			54.34	Q PB
5	Mikako Yamashita	Japan	47.47	53.47	x	53.47	q
6	Nikol Tabačková	Czech Republic	49.22	48.54	52.45	52.45	q
7	Fabienne Schonig	Germany	51.98	49.82	x	51.98	
8	Luisa Sinigaglia	Italy	46.47	43.35	51.02	51.02	
9	Kathryn Brooks	Australia	48.42	47.63	50.54	50.54	
10	Luz Mariana Castro	Mexico	46.70	45.06	50.19	50.19	
11	Stella Weinberg	Norway	48.29	44.73	46.62	48.29	
12	Ashley Pryke	Canada	45.63	48.15	x	48.15	
13	Candesha Scott	Grenada	45.01	47.86	46.84	47.86	
14	Sanobarhon Erkinova	Uzbekistan	46.05	47.84	47.72	47.84	
15	Agnese Vilcāne	Latvia	44.95	42.65	47.64	47.64	
16	Katelyn Gochenour	United States	44.28	47.45	47.53	47.53	
17	Yu Yuzhen	China	43.61	46.99	25.32	46.99	
18	Marcella Liiv	Estonia	44.74	44.90	45.01	45.01	
19	Anastasiia Ivanova	Ukraine	43.39	42.07	44.92	44.92	
20	Jeong Ji-hye	South Korea	x	42.11	40.79	42.11	
21	Shanee Angol	Dominica	34.25	36.67	30.90	36.67	
	Kelechi Nwanaga	Nigeria	DNS				

===== Group B =====
19 July

Rank	Name	Nationality	Attempts			Result	Notes
Rank	Name	Nationality	1	2	3	Result	Notes
1	Haruka Kitaguchi	Japan	52.46	56.16		56.16	Q
2	Jo-Ane van Dyk	South Africa	54.06			54.06	Q
3	Geraldine Ruckstuhl	Switzerland	40.30	50.33	52.50	52.50	q PB
4	Ilaria Casarotto	Italy	42.40	43.98	52.46	52.46	q PB
5	Marisleisys Duarthe	Cuba	52.32	47.26	46.00	52.32	q
6	Mirell Luik	Estonia	52.23	x	49.92	52.23	q
7	Brittni Wolczyk	Canada	51.69	x	50.85	51.69	
8	Emma Oosterwegel	Netherlands	49.73	47.10	x	49.73	
9	Lee Ga-hui	South Korea	48.71	46.90	49.46	49.46	
10	Estefany Chacón	Venezuela	48.81	x	47.34	48.81	
11	Chen Jiajia	China	42.70	45.31	48.53	48.53	
12	Alexanda Maria da Silva	Brazil	x	48.31	46.27	48.31	
13	Laine Donāne	Latvia	46.81	47.41	48.24	48.24	
14	Afroditi Maniou	Greece	48.23	45.94	46.59	48.23	
15	Claudia Ferreira	Portugal	48.09	x	x	48.09	
16	Azize Altın	Turkey	46.81	45.83	47.79	47.79	
17	Emma Fitzgerald	United States	46.28	x	41.22	46.28	
18	Varvara Nazarova	Kazakhstan	43.84	43.29	46.17	46.17	
19	Ioana Valentina Plavan	Romania	44.28	x	x	44.28	
20	Dina Ćosić	Serbia	42.84	39.60	32.51	42.84	
21	Annika Marie Fuchs	Germany	36.53	x	37.60	37.60	
