= 2008 African Championships in Athletics – Women's javelin throw =

The women's javelin throw event at the 2008 African Championships in Athletics was held at the Addis Ababa Stadium on May 3.

== Results ==
Rank	Athlete	Nationality	#1	#2	#3	#4	#5	#6	Result	Notes
1st place, gold medalist(s)	Sunette Viljoen	South Africa	55.12	50.40	53.16	55.17	54.33	47.69	55.17	
2nd place, silver medalist(s)	Lindy Agricole	Seychelles	52.92	x	50.47	x	50.64	50.33	52.92	SB
3rd place, bronze medalist(s)	Hana'a Omar	Egypt	49.00	52.32	51.59	49.91	50.97	48.95	52.32	
4	Cicilia Kiplangat	Kenya	x	43.84	48.79	50.55	48.58	44.07	50.55	
5	Annet Kabasindi	Uganda	41.83	44.52	46.06	x	x	46.15	46.15	
6	Sorochukwu Ihuefo	Nigeria	43.63	45.35	42.82	45.06	44.83	45.35	45.35	
7	Abaynesh Sisay	Ethiopia	41.23	x	x	37.15	36.93	x	41.23	
8	Tadelech Ragasa	Ethiopia	39.13	x	x	x	37.81	33.09	39.13	
9	Desalech Mishamo	Ethiopia	x	37.64	36.51				37.64	
	Justine Robbeson	South Africa							DNS	
	Miriam Mukulama	Zambia							DNS	
