= Mckyla van der Westhuizen =

South African javelin thrower (born 2004)

Personal information
- Born: 11 March 2004 (age 22)

Sport
- Sport: Athletics
- Event: Javelin throw

Achievements and titles
- Personal best: Javelin: 60.87 (2026)
Medal record
Women's athletics
Representing South Africa
African Championships
2022 Saint Pierre	Javelin throw

Mckyla van der Westhuizen (born 11 March 2004) is a South African javelin thrower. She won a silver medal at the 2022 African Athletics Championships and won the 2026 NCAA Championships in the United States.

== Biography ==
From Guateng, van der Westhuixen later studied at Rice University in the United States where she studied sports medicine and exercise physiology.

In August 2021, van der Westhuizen placed sixth overall in the javelin throw at the 2021 World Athletics U20 Championships in Nairobi, Kenya, with a best throw of 53.94 meters.

Van der Westhuizen was a silver medalist in the javelin throw at the 2022 African Championships in Athletics in St. Pierre, Mauritius, throwing 55.55 metres to finish behind her compatriot Jo-Ané du Plessis, but ahead of compatriot Jana van Schalkwyk in a South African sweep of the medals. Later that year she placed seventh overall in the javelin throw at the 2022 World Athletics U20 Championships in Cali, Colombia, with a best throw of 53.44 meters.

Competing for Rice University, Van der Westhuizen was the 2024 AAC champion in the javelin and placed third at the 2024 NCAA Outdoor Championships. She placed seventh at 2025 NCAA Championships in June 2025.

On 11 June 2026, Van der Westhuizen won the javelin final at the 2026 NCAA Outdoor Championships with a personal best throw of 60.87 metres. That year, she was provisionally selected for the 2026 Commonwealth Games in Glasgow.
