= 2016 African Championships in Athletics – Women's javelin throw =

The women's javelin throw event at the 2016 African Championships in Athletics was held on 25 June in Kings Park Stadium.

== Results ==
Rank	Athlete	Nationality	Result	Notes
1st place, gold medalist(s)	Sunette Viljoen	South Africa	64.08	
2nd place, silver medalist(s)	Jo-Ane van Dyk	South Africa	56.22	
3rd place, bronze medalist(s)	Pascaline Adanhoegbe	Benin	54.88	NR
4	Kelechi Nwanaga	Nigeria	53.45	
5	Lucy Aber	Uganda	51.54	
6	Megan Wilke	South Africa	50.90	
7	Jessika Rosun	Mauritius	48.90	
8	Vanessa Collin	Mauritius	47.08	
9	Zuta Mary Nartey	Ghana	45.40	
10	Stella Jenny Vieira	Congo	33.79	
	Hiwot Alemu	Ethiopia	DNS	
