= Athletics at the 2014 Commonwealth Games – Women's javelin throw =

Women's javelin throw at the Commonwealth Games

The Women's javelin throw at the 2014 Commonwealth Games, as part of the athletics programme, was held at Hampden Park on 30 July 2014.

== Final ==
Rank	Name	#1	#2	#3	#4	#5	#6	Result	Notes
1st place, gold medalist(s)	Kim Mickle (AUS)	62.97	65.96	61.45	x	x	x	65.96	GR
2nd place, silver medalist(s)	Sunette Viljoen (RSA)	62.17	62.13	62.66	62.45	62.41	63.19	63.19	
3rd place, bronze medalist(s)	Kelsey-Lee Roberts (AUS)	43.50	62.40	60.08	60.00	56.91	62.95	62.95	
4	Kathryn Mitchell (AUS)	62.33	x	61.12	x	60.62	62.59	62.59	
5	Liz Gleadle (CAN)	x	59.36	59.48	58.82	x	60.69	60.69	
6	Nadeeka Lakmali Babaranda Liyanage (SRI)	56.15	59.04	56.40	55.15	57.53	56.75	59.04	SB
7	Goldie Sayers (ENG)	57.51	57.65	55.52	x	x	57.68	57.68	
8	Annu Rani (IND)	55.23	56.37	50.35	52.71	x	54.52	56.37	
9	Izzy Jeffs (ENG)	53.77	48.91	x				53.77	
10	Freya Jones (ENG)	51.36	51.01	x				51.36	
11	Zuta Mary Nartey (GHA)	48.23	x	43.49				48.23	
12	Jessika Rosun (MRI)	47.38	47.39	x				47.39	
