= 2026 African Championships in Athletics – Women's javelin throw =

Women's javelin throw at the 2026 African Championships in Athletics
- Venue: Legon Sports Stadium
- Location: Accra, Ghana
- Dates: 16 May
- Competitors: 7 from 6 nations
- Winning time: 60.97

Medalists
gold medal	Aseel Osama Abdel Hamid	Egypt
silver medal	Arianne Duarte Morais	Cape Verde
bronze medal	Douw Smit	South Africa

The women's javelin throw event at the 2026 African Championships in Athletics was held on 16 May in Accra, Ghana.

== Results ==
Rank	Athlete	Nationality	#1	#2	#3	#4	#5	#6	Result	Notes
1st place, gold medalist(s)	Aseel Osama Abdel Hamid	Egypt							60.97	AU20R
2nd place, silver medalist(s)	Arianne Duarte Morais	Cape Verde							56.43	
3rd place, bronze medalist(s)	Jana van Schalkwyk	South Africa							54.36	
4	Sherine Shaaban Hussein	Egypt							52.32	
5	Yeshiwork Animaw	Ethiopia							50.59	
6	Carolyne Anyango Odwory	Kenya							50.25	
7	Victoria Kparika	Nigeria							46.56	
	Duka Neniko	Ethiopia							DNS	
