= Athletics at the 2015 African Games – Women's javelin throw =

The women's javelin throw event at the 2015 African Games was held on 15 September.

== Results ==
Rank	Name	Nationality	#1	#2	#3	#4	#5	#6	Result	Notes
1st place, gold medalist(s)	Kelechi Nwanaga	Nigeria	49.38	52.70	x	48.82	–	45.53	52.70	
2nd place, silver medalist(s)	Zuta Mary Nartey	Ghana	48.90	50.93	46.78	x	44.69	45.58	50.93	SB
3rd place, bronze medalist(s)	Jo-Ane van Dyk	South Africa	46.71	50.04	48.68	50.52	47.16	48.38	50.52	
4	Lucy Aber	Uganda	50.52	47.79	46.61	48.61	48.34	x	50.52	
5	Adjimon Adanhoegbe	Benin	43.03	48.90	44.08	47.02	45.91	48.44	48.90	
6	Selma Rosun	Mauritius	48.13	48.44	48.49	46.83	48.15	46.07	48.49	
7	Nourhan Haidar	Egypt	46.16	x	45.99	46.42	47.66	41.19	47.66	
8	Stella Jenny Vieira	Republic of the Congo	44.34	42.73	43.20	45.11	46.95	43.91	46.95	NR
9	Almaz Niguse	Ethiopia	39.71	41.49	41.98				41.98	
10	Gezelle Bernard	South Africa	37.12	41.24	41.87				41.87	
11	Shura Utura	Ethiopia	38.28	40.86	39.72				40.86	
12	Céline Kapanda	DR Congo	x	36.48	32.64				36.48	
