= Lindy Leveaux-Agricole =

Seychellois javelin thrower

Medal record

Women's athletics

Representing Seychelles

All-Africa Games
Bronze medal – third place	2011 Maputo	Javelin throw

African Championships
Gold medal – first place	1998 Dakar	Javelin throw
Silver medal – second place	1996 Yaoundé	Javelin throw
Silver medal – second place	2000 Algiers	Javelin throw
Silver medal – second place	2008 Addis Ababa	Javelin throw
Bronze medal – third place	2006 Bambous	Javelin throw

Lindy Brigitte Leveaux-Agricole (born 14 November 1978 in Victoria, Seychelles) is a Seychellois javelin thrower. Her personal best throw is 57.86 metres, achieved in June 2005 in Victoria. This is the national record. She also holds national records in the shot put and discus throw.

== International competitions ==
Year	Competition	Venue	Position	Event	Notes
Representing the Seychelles
1996	African Championships	Yaoundé, Cameroon	2nd	Javelin throw (old)	42.24 m
1996	World Junior Championships	Sydney, Australia	20th (q)	Discus throw	33.90 m
1996	World Junior Championships	Sydney, Australia	23rd (q)	Javelin throw (old)	39.06 m
1998	African Championships	Dakar, Senegal	1st	Javelin throw (old)	47.56 m
1998	World Cup	Johannesburg, South Africa	8th	Javelin throw (old)	43.18 m
1998	Commonwealth Games	Kuala Lumpur, Malaysia	7th	Javelin throw (old)	42.94 m
1999	All-Africa Games	Johannesburg, South Africa	7th	Discus throw	41.78 m
1999	All-Africa Games	Johannesburg, South Africa	4th	Javelin throw	47.55 m
2000	African Championships	Algiers, Algeria	2nd	Javelin throw	50.88 m
2001	Jeux de la Francophonie	Ottawa, Canada	5th	Javelin throw	53.11 m
2001	World Championships	Edmonton, Canada	21st (q)	Javelin throw	49.40 m
2003	All-Africa Games	Abuja, Nigeria	2nd	Javelin throw	53.23 m
2003	Afro-Asian Games	Hyderabad, India	8th	Javelin throw	49.41 m
2005	Jeux de la Francophonie	Niamey, Niger	5th	Discus throw	40.25 m
2005	Jeux de la Francophonie	Niamey, Niger	1st	Javelin throw	53.92 m
2006	Commonwealth Games	Melbourne, Australia	7th	Javelin throw	54.50 m
2006	African Championships	Bambous, Mauritius	3rd	Javelin throw	54.41 m
2007	All-Africa Games	Algiers, Algeria	2nd	Javelin throw	56.49 m
2007	World Championships	Osaka, Japan	—	Javelin throw	NM
2008	African Championships	Addis Ababa, Ethiopia	2nd	Javelin throw	52.92 m
2008	Olympic Games	Beijing, China	29th (q)	Javelin throw	56.32 m
2009	Jeux de la Francophonie	Beirut, Lebanon	1st	Javelin throw	57.48 m
2010	African Championships	Nairobi, Kenya	4th	Javelin throw	52.42 m
2011	All-Africa Games	Maputo, Mozambique	3rd	Javelin throw	51.26 m
