= Aïda Sellam =

Tunisian javelin thrower (born 1977)

Medal record

Women's athletics

Representing Tunisia

African Championships
| Gold medal – first place | 2000 Algiers | Javelin throw |
| Gold medal – first place | 2002 Radès | Javelin throw |
| Silver medal – second place | 2004 Brazzaville | Javelin throw |

Aïda Sellam (born September 13, 1977) is a Tunisian javelin thrower. Her personal best throw is 60.87 metres, achieved in June 2004 in Tunis.

== International competitions ==
| Year | Competition | Venue | Position | Event | Notes |
Representing Tunisia
| 1995 | African Junior Championships | Bouaké, Ivory Coast | 1st | Javelin throw (old) | 47.38 m |
| 1999 | All-Africa Games | Johannesburg, South Africa | 2nd | Javelin throw | 48.91 m |
| 2000 | African Championships | Algiers, Algeria | 1st | Javelin throw | 53.35 m |
| 2001 | Jeux de la Francophonie | Ottawa, Canada | 4th | Javelin throw | 53.34 m |
| 2001 | Mediterranean Games | Radès, Tunisia | 5th | Javelin throw | 53.23 m |
| 2002 | African Championships | Radès, Tunisia | 1st | Javelin throw | 55.46 m (CR) |
| 2002 | World Cup | Madrid, Spain | 8th | Javelin throw | 52.48 m* |
| 2003 | All-Africa Games | Abuja, Nigeria | 1st | Javelin throw | 54.58 m |
| 2004 | African Championships | Brazzaville, Congo | 2nd | Javelin throw | 54.68 m |
| 2004 | Pan Arab Games | Algiers, Algeria | 1st | Javelin throw | 58.64 m |
| 2004 | Olympic Games | Athens, Greece | 24th (q) | Javelin throw | 57.76 m |
| 2005 | Mediterranean Games | Almería, Spain | 4th | Javelin throw | 54.19 m |

* Representing Africa.
