= Athletics at the 2002 Commonwealth Games – Women's javelin throw =

Women's javelin throw at the Commonwealth Games

The women's javelin throw event at the 2002 Commonwealth Games was held on 29 July.

This was the first time that the new model of javelin was used in the women's competition at the Commonwealth Games.

== Results ==
Rank	Athlete	Nationality	#1	#2	#3	#4	#5	#6	Result	Notes
1st place, gold medalist(s)	Laverne Eve	Bahamas	56.56	x	x	57.62	58.12	58.46	58.46	SB
2nd place, silver medalist(s)	Cecilia McIntosh	Australia	55.45	55.32	57.42	52.36	53.22	56.33	57.42	
3rd place, bronze medalist(s)	Kelly Morgan	England	57.09	56.51	54.39	x	x	55.70	57.09	
4	Sorochukwu Ihuefo	Nigeria	50.87	49.03	50.04	46.81	47.40	52.24	52.24	
5	Annet Kabasindi	Uganda	48.85	49.20	47.79	50.32	46.31	51.33	51.33	PB
6	Goldie Sayers	England	50.94	x	x	51.23	x	51.32	51.32	
7	Karen Martin	England	38.10	47.46	50.28	x	x	49.21	50.28	
8	Bernadette Ravina	Mauritius	47.57	49.56	48.43	46.99	49.58	47.27	49.58	
