= Athletics at the 2011 Summer Universiade – Women's javelin throw =

The women's javelin throw event at the 2011 Summer Universiade was held on 18 August.

== Results ==
Rank	Athlete	Nationality	#1	#2	#3	#4	#5	#6	Result	Notes
1st place, gold medalist(s)	Sunette Viljoen	South Africa	x	66.47	x	57.46	60.36	58.82	66.47	AR
2nd place, silver medalist(s)	Marina Maksimova	Russia	x	49.55	59.29	x	59.87	56.20	59.87	
3rd place, bronze medalist(s)	Justine Robbeson	South Africa	55.48	55.47	54.82	x	59.78	59.28	59.78	
4	Vira Rebryk	Ukraine	x	54.93	54.24	55.69	58.43	56.65	58.43	
5	Melissa Dupré	Belgium	55.37	54.32	53.38	57.30	x	58.25	58.25	NR
6	Xue Juan	China	50.10	54.20	x	x	x	x	54.20	
7	Maria Negoiţă	Romania	48.59	53.55	53.53	50.02	51.13	53.31	53.55	
8	Elizabeth Gleadle	Canada	49.19	52.07	50.52	x	49.93	48.93	52.07	
9	Bernarda Letnar	Slovenia	45.40	44.70	49.56				49.56	
10	Marte Aaltvedt	Norway	x	49.07	x				49.07	
11	Gundega Grīva	Latvia	45.81	44.88	48.06				48.06	
12	Lee Hyelim	South Korea	47.79	x	46.18				47.79	
13	Maria Jensen	Denmark	44.96	x	x				44.96	SB
14	Linda Treiel	Estonia	x	43.60	x				43.60	
15	Rita Fiave	Ghana	37.02	x	42.59				42.59	
