= Gerlize de Klerk =

South African javelin thrower

Medal record

Women's athletics

Representing South Africa

African Championships
Bronze medal – third place	2012 Porto-Novo	Javelin throw

Gerlize de Klerk (born 23 March 1989) is a retired South African javelin thrower.

She won the gold medal at the 2007 African Junior Championships, the silver medal at the 2011 All-Africa Games and the bronze medal at the 2012 African Championships. She also competed at the 2005 World Youth Championships without reaching the final.

Her personal best throw is 56.04 metres, achieved in March 2011 in Germiston.

== Results summary ==
Year	Event	Venue	Position	Distance (m)
2005	2005 World Youth Championships	MAR Marrakesh	14th place	38,11
2007	2007 African Junior Championships	BFA Ouagadougou	1st place	49,18
2011	2011 All-Africa Games	MOZ Maputo	2nd place	52,27
2012	2012 African Championships	BEN Porto-Novo	3rd place	49,85
