= Athletics at the 2019 African Games – Women's javelin throw =

The women's javelin throw event at the 2019 African Games was held on 28 August in Rabat.

== Results ==
Rank	Name	Nationality	#1	#2	#3	#4	#5	#6	Result	Notes
1st place, gold medalist(s)	Kelechi Nwanaga	Nigeria	52.21	51.57	54.82	52.68	x	55.88	55.88	
2nd place, silver medalist(s)	Jo-Ane van Dyk	South Africa	53.37	51.54	53.87	54.08	53.20	55.38	55.38	
3rd place, bronze medalist(s)	Sunette Viljoen	South Africa	53.09	x	50.97	52.35	53.44	52.81	53.44	
4	Josephine Joyce Lalam	Uganda	53.39	49.15	46.46	47.68	45.03	44.54	53.39	NR
5	Selma Rosun	Mauritius	51.81	51.47	50.36	49.67	49.63	x	51.81	
6	Salome Moraa	Kenya	48.79	43.76	x	43.50	42.38	43.51	48.79	
7	Damacline Mwango Nyakeruri	Kenya	38.69	48.19	44.69	38.15	43.17	25.54	48.19	
8	Shereen Hussein	Egypt	39.40	42.08	47.22	42.63	47.33	x	47.33	
9	Lucy Aber	Uganda	42.92	46.68	46.04				46.68	
10	Abeba Abera	Ethiopia	36.28	41.99	44.03				44.03	
11	Bizunesh Tadesse	Ethiopia	43.27	38.20	38.30				43.27	
