= Athletics at the 2023 African Games – Women's javelin throw =

The women's javelin throw event at the 2023 African Games was held on 20 March 2024 in Accra, Ghana.

== Medalists ==
Gold	Silver	Bronze
Jo-Ané du Plessis; South Africa	Jana van Schalkwyk; South Africa	Josephine Joyce Lalam; Uganda

== Results ==
Held on 20 March

Rank	Name	Nationality	#1	#2	#3	#4	#5	#6	Result	Notes
1st place, gold medalist(s)	Jo-Ané du Plessis	South Africa	x	58.99	60.30	58.17	57.14	60.80	60.80	GR
2nd place, silver medalist(s)	Jana van Schalkwyk	South Africa	52.63	52.03	50.43	52.40	53.56	57.64	57.64	
3rd place, bronze medalist(s)	Josephine Joyce Lalam	Uganda	50.15	52.95	57.01	51.94	49.00	48.95	57.01	NR
4	Selma Rosun	Mauritius	50.07	47.17	48.77	x	49.27	50.75	50.75	
5	Victoria Kparika Effiom	Nigeria	44.42	44.51	x	48.84	x	x	48.84	
6	Damacline Nyakeruri	Kenya	x	44.39	43.77	45.17	47.25	x	47.25	
7	Dingete Adela	Ethiopia	x	46.48	46.56	43.70	46.52	45.80	46.56	
8	Yeshiwork Animaw	Ethiopia	x	x	43.60	45.93	43.58	42.69	45.93	
9	Mwanaamina Mkwayu	Tanzania	x	40.95	x				40.95	
