= Bernadette Ravina =

Mauritian javelin thrower (born 1975)

Personal information
- Full name: Bernadette Perrine-Ravina
- Born: 18 February 1975 (age 51)

Sport
- Country: Mauritius
- Sport: Athletics
- Event: Javelin throw
Medal record
Women's athletics
Representing Mauritius
African Championships
Silver medal – second place	1998 Dakar	Javelin throw
Bronze medal – third place	2002 Radès	Javelin throw

Bernadette Perrine-Ravina (born 18 February 1975) is a retired Mauritian javelin thrower.

She won the bronze medal at the 1995 All-Africa Games, the silver medal at the 1997 Jeux de la Francophonie, the silver medal at the 1998 African Championships, finished sixth at the 2001 Jeux de la Francophonie, won the bronze medal at the 2002 African Championships, finished eighth at the 2002 Commonwealth Games, sixth at the 2006 African Championships, seventh at the 2010 African Championships, fourth at the 2011 All-Africa Games and seventh at the 2012 African Championships.

She also won the 1998 and 2003 Indian Ocean Island Games. As a shot putter she finished fifth at the 1998 African Championships.

Her personal best throw is 54.56 metres, achieved in June 2002 in Réduit. This is the Mauritian record.
