= Athletics at the 2025 Summer World University Games – Women's javelin throw =

Women's javelin throw at the 2025 Summer World University Games
- Venue: Lohrheidestadion
- Location: Bochum, Germany
- Dates: 25 July (qualification); 26 July (final)
- Competitors: 23 from 19 nations
- Winning distance: 59.90 m PB

Medalists
gold medal	Esra Türkmen	Turkey
silver medal	Evelyn Bliss	United States
bronze medal	Jana van Schalkwyk	South Africa

The women's javelin throw event at the 2025 Summer World University Games was held in Bochum, Germany, at Lohrheidestadion on 25 and 26 July.

== Records ==
Prior to the competition, the records were as follows:

Record	Athlete (nation)	Distance (m)	Location	Date
Games record	Osleidys Menéndez (CUB)	69.82 m	Beijing, China	29 August 2001

== Results ==
=== Qualification ===
All athletes over 57.60 m (Q) or at least the 12 best performers (q) advance to the final.

==== Group A ====
Place	Athlete	Nation	#1	#2	#3	Result	Notes
1	Evelyn Bliss	United States	60.81			60.81 m	Q, PB
2	Lianna Davidson	Australia	57.83			57.83 m	Q
3	Esra Türkmen	Turkey	49.91	53.77	57.48	57.48 m	q
4	Gabriela Andrukonis	Poland	49.71	48.81	51.26	51.26 m	q
5	Fanni Kövér	Hungary	45.48	50.27	51.25	51.25 m	q
6	Pin-Hsun Chu	Chinese Taipei	47.00	49.56	50.60	50.60 m	
7	Pilke Kössi	Finland	44.49	49.37	x	49.37 m	
8	Ng Jing Xuan	Malaysia	40.94	47.97	45.52	47.97 m	
9	Amanda Rask	Sweden	45.61	42.22	47.48	47.48 m	
10	Christiana Ellina	Cyprus	47.43	x	x	47.43 m	
11	Chiara-Belinda Schuler	Austria	41.69	42.36	43.39	43.39 m	
12	Shakshi Sharma	India	39.84	38.73	-	39.84 m	

==== Group B ====
Place	Athlete	Nation	#1	#2	#3	Result	Notes
1	Mia Gordon	Australia	56.39	-	-	56.39 m	q
2	Julia Ulbricht	Germany	55.27	x	-	55.27 m	q
3	Emilia Karell	Finland	53.94	-	-	53.94 m	q
4	Aoi Murakami	Japan	53.91	x	52.34	53.91 m	q
5	Jana van Schalkwyk	South Africa	53.65	51.38	49.55	53.65 m	q
6	Karishma Sanil	India	46.41	48.93	53.12	53.12 m	q
7	Yu-Ting Chiu	Chinese Taipei	42.88	49.32	51.36	51.36 m	q
8	Hyeonjin Kang	South Korea	43.65	x	47.76	47.76 m	
9	Katre Marit Liiv	Estonia	46.16	46.07	46.75	46.75 m	
10	Yusra Ayub	Pakistan	33.45	36.72	36.13	36.72 m	
11	Emersiana Naman	Tanzania	21.21	29.57	-	29.57 m	

=== Final ===
Place	Athlete	Nation	#1	#2	#3	#4	#5	#6	Result	Notes
1st place, gold medalist(s)	Esra Türkmen	Turkey	52.56	54.10	x	56.31	54.28	59.90	59.90 m	PB
2nd place, silver medalist(s)	Evelyn Bliss	United States	57.37	56.94	56.63	x	53.89	51.57	57.37 m	
3rd place, bronze medalist(s)	Jana van Schalkwyk	South Africa	51.73	x	56.73	x	54.71	54.31	56.73 m	
4	Aoi Murakami	Japan	55.03	x	56.28	55.72	53.42	54.15	56.28 m	
5	Julia Ulbricht	Germany	x	55.60	51.49	x	56.07	x	56.07 m	
6	Emilia Karell	Finland	53.52	x	55.97	x	x	x	55.97 m	PB
7	Lianna Davidson	Australia	53.45	53.60	54.91	x	52.77	55.95	55.95 m	
8	Mia Gordon	Australia	52.85	54.30	54.05	x	53.55	51.28	54.30 m	
9	Gabriela Andrukonis	Poland	50.65	52.88	53.41				53.41 m	
10	Karishma Sanil	India	52.89	52.93	50.45				52.93 m	
11	Yu-Ting Chiu	Chinese Taipei	52.48	46.92	50.28				52.48 m	
12	Fanni Kövér	Hungary	50.24	48.96	x				50.24 m	
