= 2026 World Athletics U20 Championships – Women's javelin throw =

Women's javelin throw at the 2026 World Athletics U20 Championships
- Venue: Hayward Field
- Dates: 7 August (Qualification); 8 August (Final)
- Competitors: 27 from 22 nations
- Winning distance: 59.82 m

Medalists
gold medal	Aseel Osama Abdel Hamid	Egypt
silver medal	Vita Barbić	Croatia
bronze medal	Tai Yu-chin	Chinese Taipei

The women's javelin throw at the 2026 World Athletics U20 Championships was held at Hayward Field in Eugene, United States on 7 and 8 August 2026.

== Records ==
U20 standing records prior to the 2026 World Athletics U20 Championships were as follows:

Record	Athlete & Nationality	Mark	Location	Date
World U20 Record	Yan Ziyi (CHN)	71.74 m	Xiamen, China	23 May 2026
Championship Record	Adriana Vilagoš (SRB)	63.52 m	Cali, Colombia	2 August 2022
World U20 Leading	Yan Ziyi (CHN)	71.74 m	Xiamen, China	23 May 2026

== Results ==
=== Qualification ===
Qualification took place in the morning session on 7 August 2026. Athletes attaining a mark of at least 52.50 metres (Q) or at least the 12 best performers (q) qualified for the final.

==== Group A ====
Place	Athlete	Nation	Round			Mark	Notes
Place	Athlete	Nation	#1	#2	#3	Mark	Notes
1	Aseel Osama Abdel Hamid	Egypt	55.89			55.89 m	Q
2	Ayaka Suzuki	Japan	53.13			53.13 m	Q, SB
3	Taysha Stubbs	Bahamas	46.66	50.03	52.55	52.55 m	Q
4	Marine Grobler	South Africa	43.43	51.59	-	51.59 m	q
5	Sophia Mazzoni	United States	42.81	49.85	50.33	50.33 m	q
6	Min-ji Kim	South Korea	48.95	49.14	48.05	49.14 m	q
7	Jolie Baerveldt	Netherlands	44.93	x	49.08	49.08 m	q
8	Poonam	India	48.81	x	x	48.81 m	
9	Amelia Gibas	Poland	42.20	47.87	48.65	48.65 m	
10	Sze Oi Sarah Kwong	Hong Kong	46.20	43.06	48.39	48.39 m	
11	Hu Qian	China	44.19	x	47.98	47.98 m	
12	Lina Filipović	Croatia	x	46.37	x	46.37 m	
13	Kimberly Flores	Peru	44.61	43.30	45.93	45.93 m	

==== Group B ====
Place	Athlete	Nation	Round			Mark	Notes
Place	Athlete	Nation	#1	#2	#3	Mark	Notes
1	Vita Barbić	Croatia	49.66	56.29		56.29 m	Q
2	Tai Yu-chin	Chinese Taipei	53.91			53.91 m	Q
3	Emily Harbach	United States	52.98			52.98 m	Q
4	Stephane Hook	South Africa	47.70	49.23	45.19	49.23 m	q
5	Živa Križ	Slovenia	46.80	x	49.22	49.22 m	q
6	Ana Espenilla	Philippines	48.71	48.37	x	48.71 m	
7	Bryndis Embla Einarsdóttir	Iceland	x	48.64	47.62	48.64 m	
8	Fang Yuting	China	43.88	46.78	48.26	48.26 m	
9	Ayuto Kurokawa	Japan	47.76	42.47	45.60	47.76 m	
10	Viola Lei Hansgaard	Denmark	47.74	42.54	47.04	47.74 m	
11	Elin Lindberg	Sweden	x	46.07	47.63	47.63 m	
12	Leonie Zoe Haller	Austria	41.54	42.85	45.61	45.61 m	
13	Minea Kumlander	Finland	43.06	44.81	42.93	44.81 m	
14	Maira Milagros Rosas	Argentina	43.94	x	40.72	43.94 m	

=== Final ===
The final took place in the afternoon session on 8 August 2026.

Place	Athlete	Nation	Round						Mark	Notes
Place	Athlete	Nation	#1	#2	#3	#4	#5	#6	Mark	Notes
1st place, gold medalist(s)	Aseel Osama Abdel Hamid	Egypt	52.41	53.57	57.35	52.88	58.28	59.82	59.82 m	
2nd place, silver medalist(s)	Vita Barbić	Croatia	51.36	56.57	x	x	55.61	56.60	56.60 m	
3rd place, bronze medalist(s)	Tai Yu-chin	Chinese Taipei	44.14	54.27	49.92	52.96	52.17	47.15	54.27 m	
4	Emily Harbach	United States	47.27	51.80	46.58	47.36	x	x	51.80 m	
5	Ayaka Suzuki	Japan	46.68	47.00	44.24	51.33	49.69	49.31	51.33 m	
6	Marine Grobler	South Africa	46.45	50.36	50.01	48.09	48.84		50.36 m	
7	Min-ji Kim	South Korea	46.93	49.45	44.27	48.24	49.19		49.45 m	
8	Stephane Hook	South Africa	46.93	49.45	44.27	48.24	49.19		49.45 m	
9	Taysha Stubbs	Bahamas	48.64	48.27	47.28	45.47			48.64 m	
10	Sophia Mazzoni	United States	47.31	x	46.56	46.24			47.31 m	
11	Živa Križ	Slovenia	45.51	45.68	x				45.68 m	
12	Jolie Baerveldt	Netherlands	44.64	43.69	45.31				45.31 m	
