= Athletics at the 2011 All-Africa Games – Women's javelin throw =

The women's javelin throw event at the 2011 All-Africa Games was held on 13 September.

== Results ==
Rank	Athlete	Nationality	#1	#2	#3	#4	#5	#6	Result	Notes
1st place, gold medalist(s)	Justine Robbeson	South Africa	49.72	52.74	55.33	52.32	x	52.82	55.33	
2nd place, silver medalist(s)	Gerlize de Klerk	South Africa	50.15	50.37	46.23	47.72	52.27	48.85	52.27	
3rd place, bronze medalist(s)	Lindy Agricole	Seychelles	47.80	44.83	51.26	49.45	x	49.50	51.26	
4	Bernadette Ravina	Mauritius	47.07	46.28	44.18	x	x	44.44	47.07	
5	Jessika Rosun	Mauritius	42.55	x	40.53	43.14	43.06	x	43.14	
6	Georgina Chirindza	Mozambique	37.06	38.12	x	35.63	34.36	35.33	38.12	
7	Jucelina Moreira	São Tomé and Príncipe	32.68	x	28.83	33.28	27.36	22.72	33.28	
