= Evelyn Bliss =

American javelin thrower (born 2005)

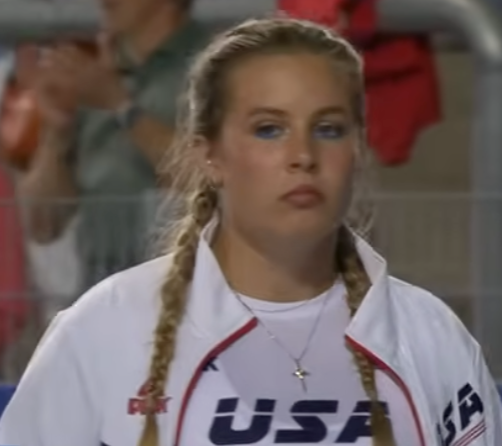
- At the 2025 Summer World University Games

Personal information
- Born: June 14, 2005 (age 21) Rimersburg, Pennsylvania

Sport
- Sport: Athletics
- Event: Javelin throw

Achievements and titles
- Personal bests: Javelin: 61.34 m (Bison Outdoor Classic, 2026)
Medal record
Women's athletics
Representing United States
NACAC Championships
Gold medal – first place	2025 Freeport	Javelin throw
Summer World University Games
Silver medal – second place	2025 Bochum	Javelin
World U20 Championships
Bronze medal – third place	2024 Lima	Javelin throw
Pan American U20 Championships
Silver medal – second place	2023 Mayagüez	Javelin throw

Evelyn Bliss (born June 14, 2005) is an American javelin thrower at Bucknell University. She won the 2025 USA Championships and a silver medal at the 2025 University Games, and a bronze medal at the 2024 World Junior Championships.

== Early life ==
From Rimersburg, Pennsylvania, she graduated from Union High School in 2023 before attending Bucknell University.

== Career ==
In May 2023, she threw personal beats on consecutive weeks and won the Pennsylvania age-group championships with a meet record, and moved to third on the state all-time list. In July 2023, she won the American under-20 championships in Eugene, Oregon with a throw of 51.79 metres. In August 2023, she won a silver medal in the javelin throw at the 2023 Pan American U20 Championships in Mayagüez, Puerto Rico, with a throw of 52.73 metres.

Bliss won the javelin throw at the Patriot League Outdoor Championships in 2024. She went on to have a sixth place finish at the US Olympic Trials in June 2024 with a personal best 55.82 metres, despite being the youngest competitor in the field. She won the bronze medal in the javelin at the 2024 World Athletics U20 Championships in Lima, Peru, with a throw of 54.01 metres.

She placed twelfth at the 2025 NCAA Outdoor Championships, an improvement of one place on her thirteenth place finish the year before, becoming the second two-time All-American for Bucknell University. She threw a personal best 60.81 metres to qualify for the final of the javelin throw at the 2025 Summer World University Games, before winning the silver medal in the final with a throw of 57.37 metres. Her throw in the preliminary round moved her to tenth on the American all-time list.

She threw 57.77 metres to win the javelin throw at the 2025 USA Outdoor Track and Field Championships in Eugene, Oregon for her first senior national title. She was named in the United States squad for the 2025 NACAC Championships, winning the gold medal with a throw of 58.62 metres to finish ahead of compatriot Madison Wiltrout and Rhema Otabor of the Bahamas. She competed at the 2025 World Athletics Championships in Tokyo, Japan, throwing 58.88 metres without advancing to the final.

On 28 March 2026, she placed third behind Madison Wiltrout and Maddie Harris in the javelin throw at the USATF Winter Long Throws National Championship in Arizona with a throw of 54.70 metres. On 23 July 2026, competing in the women's javelin she had a best throw of 60.41 metres to place second defending her title at the 2026 USA Outdoor Track and Field Championships in New York, finishing runner-up to Madison Wiltrout.
