= 2010 African Championships in Athletics – Women's javelin throw =

The women's javelin throw at the 2010 African Championships in Athletics was held on July 31.

== Results ==
Rank	Athlete	Nationality	#1	#2	#3	#4	#5	#6	Result	Notes
1st place, gold medalist(s)	Sunette Viljoen	South Africa	X	63.33	60.46	58.33	61.43	X	63.33	
2nd place, silver medalist(s)	Justine Robbeson	South Africa	58.21	57.85	58.79	60.24	56.91	54.15	60.24	
3rd place, bronze medalist(s)	Hanaa Ramada Omar Hassan	Egypt	51.10	51.26	52.49	55.14	54.03	51.37	55.14	
4	Lindy Leveau-Agricole	Seychelles	50.67	X	46.51	45.03	52.01	52.42	52.42	
5	Annet Kabasindi	Uganda	44.18	45.33	48.56	44.27	47.80	50.84	50.84	
6	Viola Chebet	Kenya	48.06	48.56	48.01	49.47	X	–	49.47	SB
7	Bernadette Ravina	Mauritius	45.14	45.64	46.59	46.04	46.22	45.03	46.59	
8	Lucy Okumu Aber	Uganda	46.51	X	45.52	44.97	44.50	43.01	46.51	
9	Miriam Mukulama	Zambia	43.69	39.70	43.65				43.69	
10	Jessika Rosun	Mauritius	41.42	43.41	41.64				43.41	
11	Priscilla Isiao	Kenya	39.59	41.13	36.91				41.13	
12	Cicilia Kiplagat	Kenya	36.99	39.44	39.23				39.44	
13	Tadelech Regasa	Ethiopia	38.52	X	38.45				38.52	
14	Mwanaidi Ali	Tanzania	37.34	36.38	37.66				37.66	
