= Klaudia Maruszewska =

Polish javelin thrower (born 1997)

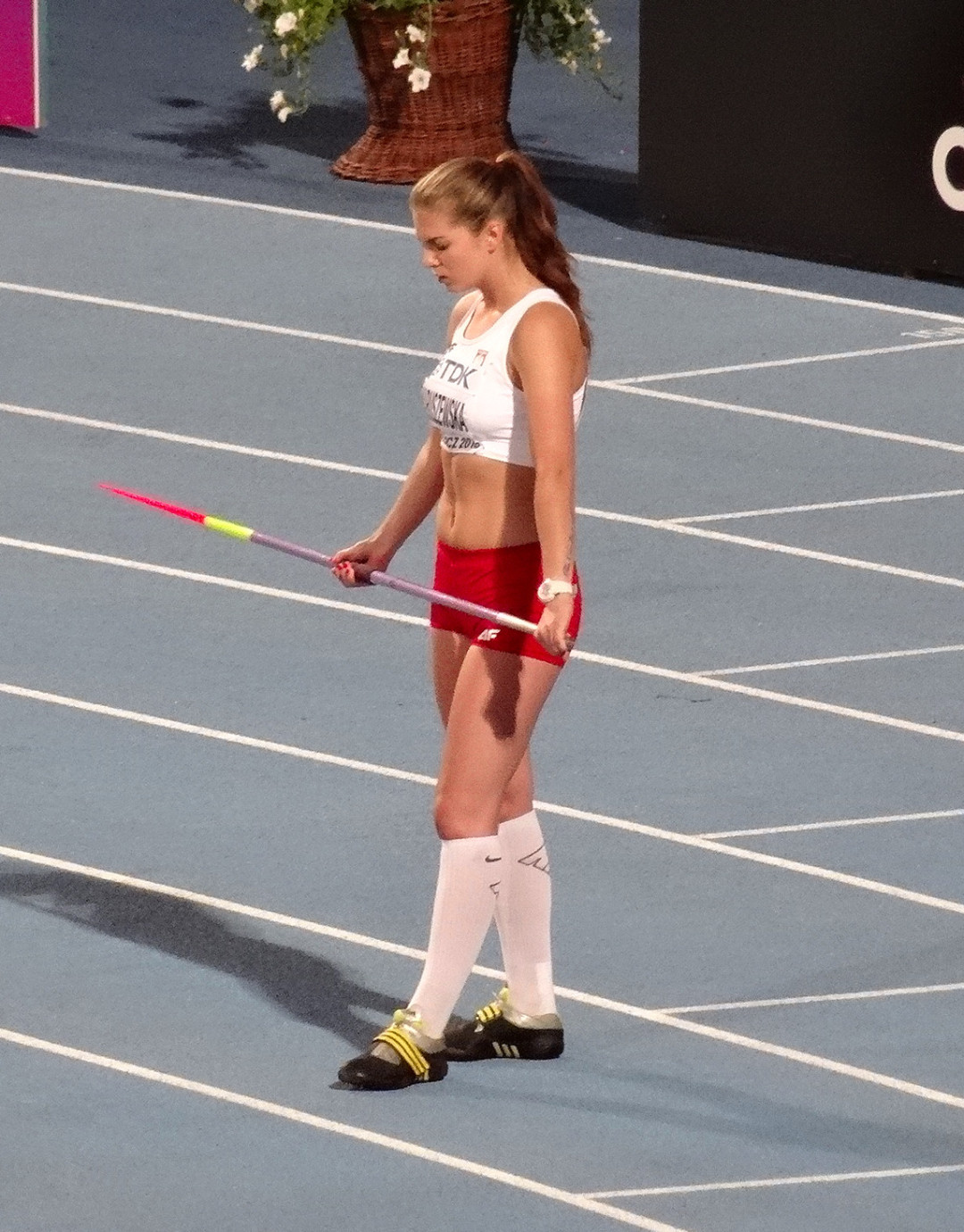
- Klaudia Maruszewska in 2016

Personal information
- Nationality: Polish
- Born: 28 August 1997 (age 28) Poland

Sport
- Country: Poland
- Sport: Track and field
- Event: Javelin throw
- Club: LKS Jantar Ustka
- Coached by: Henryk Michalski

Achievements and titles
- Personal best: 57.59 m (2016)
Medal record
Women's athletics
Representing Poland
World Junior Championships
Gold medal – first place	2016 Bydgoszcz	Javelin throw
- Updated on 23 July 2016

Klaudia Maruszewska (born 28 August 1997) is a Polish track and field athlete who competes in the javelin throw. She won the gold medal at the 2016 World Junior Championships with a personal best of 57.59 metres.

== Competition record ==
Year	Competition	Venue	Position	Event	Notes
Representing Poland
2013	European Youth Summer Olympic Festival	Utrecht, Netherlands	15th (q)	Javelin (500g)	40.46 m
2014	European Youth Olympic Trials	Baku, Azerbaijan	18th (q)	Javelin (500g)	44.85 m
2016	World U20 Championships	Bydgoszcz, Poland	1st	Javelin	57.59 m
2017	European U23 Championships	Bydgoszcz, Poland	10th	Javelin	55.11 m
2019	European U23 Championships	Gävle, Sweden	10th	Javelin	48.38 m
