= 2014 African Championships in Athletics – Women's javelin throw =

The women's javelin throw event at the 2014 African Championships in Athletics was held on August 13 on Stade de Marrakech.

== Results ==
Rank	Athlete	Nationality	#1	#2	#3	#4	#5	#6	Result	Notes
1st place, gold medalist(s)	Sunette Viljoen	South Africa	63.39	65.32	57.87	57.27	62.23	65.21	65.32	CR
2nd place, silver medalist(s)	Zuta Mary Nartey	Ghana	x	44.35	41.72	43.30	46.28	52.57	52.57	
3rd place, bronze medalist(s)	Selma Rosun	Mauritius	44.30	45.68	46.16	x	48.04	47.76	48.04	
4	Adjimon Adanhoegbe	Benin	42.99	x	45.69	45.67	45.84	42.63	45.84	
5	Lucy Aber	Uganda	x	x	34.95	37.36	39.37	45.50	45.50	
6	Shura Utura	Ethiopia	40.58	38.62	39.98	x	38.36	39.26	40.58	
