= 2004 African Championships in Athletics – Women's javelin throw =

The women's javelin throw event at the 2004 African Championships in Athletics was held in Brazzaville, Republic of the Congo on July 15.

== Results ==
Rank	Name	Nationality	Result	Notes
1st place, gold medalist(s)	Sunette Viljoen	South Africa	60.13	
2nd place, silver medalist(s)	Aïda Sellam	Tunisia	54.68	
3rd place, bronze medalist(s)	Cecilia Kiplangat	Kenya	48.78	
4	Adama Sané	Senegal	42.21	
5	Renate Bondzo-Goma	Republic of the Congo	35.86	
