= 2002 African Championships in Athletics – Women's javelin throw =

The women's javelin throw event at the 2002 African Championships in Athletics was held in Radès, Tunisia on August 8.

== Results ==
| Rank | Name | Nationality | Result | Notes |
|---|---|---|---|---|
| 1st place, gold medalist(s) | Aïda Sellam | Tunisia | 55.46 | |
| 2nd place, silver medalist(s) | Sorochukwu Ihuefo | Nigeria | 55.30 | |
| 3rd place, bronze medalist(s) | Bernadette Ravina | Mauritius | 51.49 | |
| 4 | Cecilia Kiplangat | Kenya | 49.48 | |
| 5 | Hana'a Ramadhan Omar | Egypt | 49.01 | |
| 6 | Saloua Dhouibi | Tunisia | 47.74 | |
| 7 | Daria Smith | Namibia | 46.03 | |
| | Fatoumata Camara | Guinea | DNS | |
