= Jana van Schalkwyk =

South African javelin thrower (born 2001)

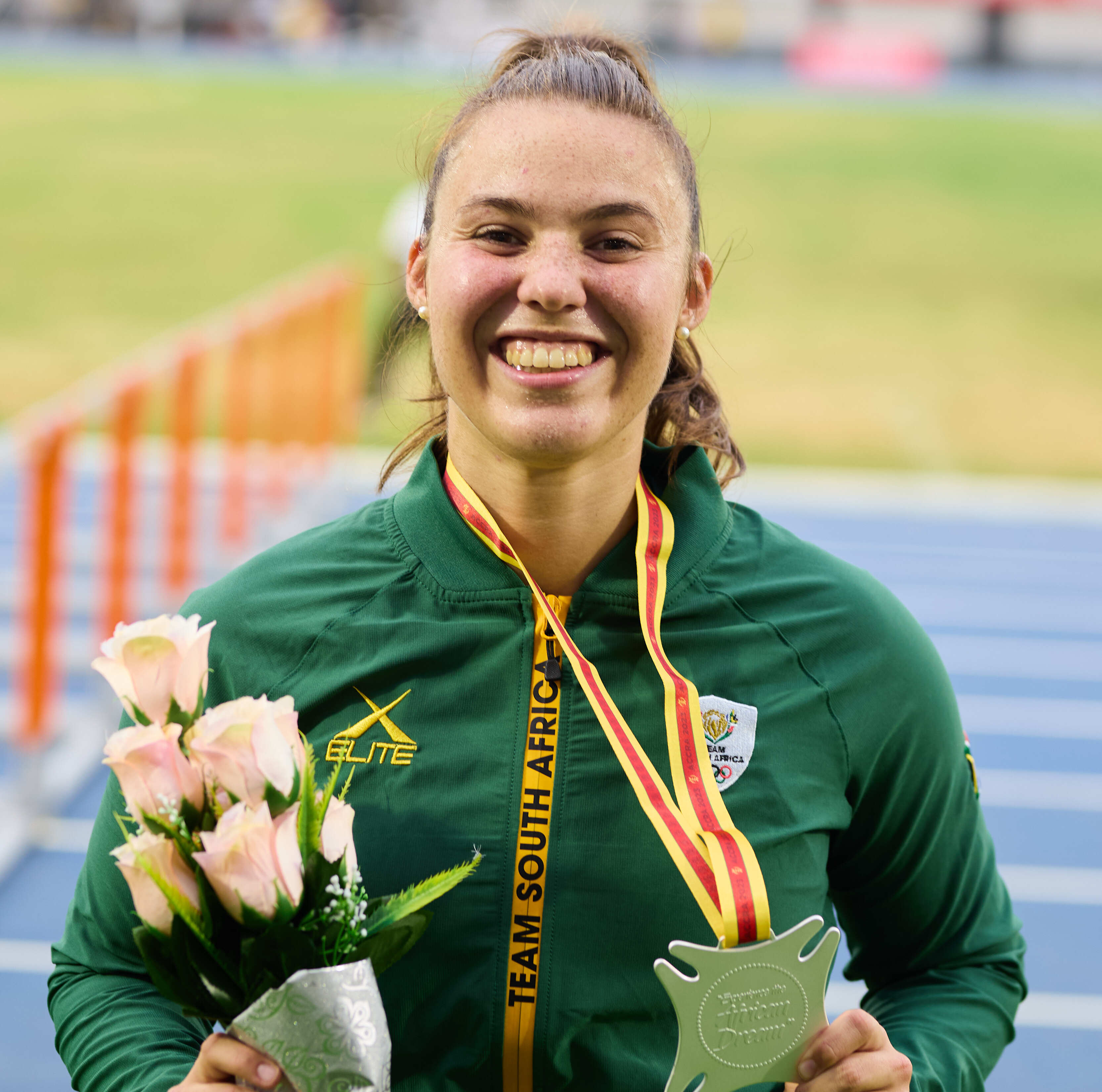
- Jana van Schalkwyk at the 2023 African Games

Personal information
- Nationality: South African
- Born: 7 March 2001 (age 25)
- Education: Stellenbosch University

Sport
- Sport: Athletics
- Event: Javelin throw

Achievements and titles
- Personal best(s): Javelin: 57.64m (Accra, 2024)
Medal record
Women's athletics
Representing South Africa
African Games
Silver medal – second place	2023 Accra	Javelin throw
African Championships
Silver medal – second place	2024 Douala	Javelin throw
Bronze medal – third place	2022 Saint Pierre	Javelin throw
Bronze medal – third place	2026 Accra	Javelin throw
Summer World University Games
Bronze medal – third place	2021 Chengdu	Javelin throw
Bronze medal – third place	2025 Bochum	Javelin throw

Jana van Schalkwyk (born 7 March 2001) is a South African javelin thrower. She was a silver medalist at the 2023 African Games, and is a two-time medalist representing South Africa the African Championships in Athletics and a two-time medalist at the Summer World University Games.

== Early life ==
Van Schalkwyk grew up in the town of Melkbosstrand attended Paarl Gymnasium in the Western Cape of South Africa. She started javelin at 13 years-old and broke the school age-group record with her second throw while competing barefoot. She graduated from Stellenbosch University with a Bachelor of Communications in Management Science, later also studying at University of California, Los Angeles in the United States.

== Career ==
She was African Championships bronze medallist in June 2022 in St Pierre, Mauritius with a throw of 54.49 metres, finishing behind her compatriots Jo-Ané du Plessis and Mckyla van der Westhuizen in a South African sweep of the medals.

In April 2023, she increased her personal best to 55.75 in Potchefstroom. She increased her personal best to 57.38 metres in Nyíregyháza in June 2023. She was a bronze medalist at the World University Games in August 2023 with a 57.45m personal best throw.

She was a silver medalist at the 2023 African Games in March 2024 in Accra with a throw of 57.64m. The following year, van Schalkwyk represented South Africa and won the silver medal at the 2024 African Championships in Douala, Cameroon.

In August 2025, van Schalkwyk secured a second medal at the FISU Games with a bronze medal that the 2025 Summer World University Games in Bochum, Germany.

In April 2026, she won the javelin title at the South African Championships in Stellenbosch. The following month, she won the bronze medal in the javelin at the 2026 African Championships in Athletics in Accra.
