= 2019 European Athletics U23 Championships – Women's javelin throw =

The women's javelin throw event at the 2019 European Athletics U23 Championships was held in Gävle, Sweden, at Gavlehov Stadium Park on 13 and 14 July.

== Medalists ==
Gold	Silver	Bronze
Annika Fuchs; Germany	Eda Tuğsuz; Turkey	Evelina Mendes; France

== Results ==
=== Qualification ===
Qualification rule: 54.00 (Q) or the 12 best results (q) qualified for the final.

Rank	Group	Name	Nationality	#1	#2	#3	Results	Notes
1	A	Annika Fuchs	Germany	61.06			61.06	Q
2	A	Eda Tuğsuz	Turkey	55.94			55.94	Q
3	B	Sara Zabarino	Italy	51.06	52.45	55.16	55.16	Q
4	A	Géraldine Ruckstuhl	Switzerland	52.84	53.79	54.59	54.59	Q
5	B	Evelina Mendes	France	53.94	x	52.03	53.94	q
6	A	Elina Kinnunen	Finland	53.43	48.99	48.82	53.43	q
7	A	Laine Donāne	Latvia	47.65	53.37	50.23	53.37	q, PB
8	A	Claudia Ferreira	Portugal	52.27	x	x	52.27	q
9	B	Klaudia Maruszewska	Poland	52.09	50.65	50.60	52.09	q
10	A	Palina Lasko	Belarus	47.68	49.95	52.09	52.09	q
11	A	Luisa Sinigaglia	Italy	51.20	48.05	x	51.20	q
12	B	Mali Ingeborg Vollan Marstad	Norway	44.81	50.88	46.92	50.88	q
13	A	Carolin Näslund	Sweden	47.97	50.59	x	50.59	
14	B	Barbara Tremmel	Hungary	48.83	x	44.07	48.83	
15	B	Patricia Madl	Austria	45.12	47.98	45.13	47.98	
16	B	Valeriya Kuchina	Authorised Neutral Athletes	42.66	40.29	47.60	47.60	SB
17	B	Mirell Luik	Estonia	43.05	45.34	47.48	47.48	
18	B	Suvi Kemppainen	Finland	46.79	43.42	47.17	47.17	
19	B	Fanni Máté	Hungary	45.59	x	x	45.59	
20	A	Ioana Valentina Plavan	Romania	42.13	x	x	42.13	

=== Final ===
Rank	Name	Nationality	#1	#2	#3	#4	#5	#6	Result	Notes
1st place, gold medalist(s)	Annika Fuchs	Germany	63.68	x	x	x	x	x	63.68	PB
2nd place, silver medalist(s)	Eda Tuğsuz	Turkey	61.03	60.50	x	x	x	58.55	61.03	
3rd place, bronze medalist(s)	Evelina Mendes	France	55.57	x	52.09	52.52	x	51.19	55.57	
4	Luisa Sinigaglia	Italy	51.47	50.48	45.88	52.23	48.67	48.94	52.23	
5	Géraldine Ruckstuhl	Switzerland	48.31	45.09	50.82	51.70	45.77	51.84	51.84	
6	Claudia Ferreira	Portugal	47.42	47.65	50.29	x	49.99	51.27	51.27	
7	Sara Zabarino	Italy	51.02	50.28	49.86	49.96	49.81	49.89	51.02	
8	Palina Lasko	Belarus	50.69	49.45	50.78	48.88	48.49	49.10	50.78	
9	Laine Donāne	Latvia	47.96	48.59	47.39				48.59	
10	Klaudia Maruszewska	Poland	47.56	48.38	x				48.38	
11	Mali Ingeborg Vollan Marstad	Norway	44.11	45.89	47.89				47.89	
12	Elina Kinnunen	Finland	x	47.57	46.59				47.57	
