= Athletics at the 2010 Commonwealth Games – Women's javelin throw =

Women's javelin throw at the Commonwealth Games

The Women's javelin throw at the 2010 Commonwealth Games as part of the athletics programme was held at the Jawaharlal Nehru Stadium on Saturday 9 October 2010.

== Records ==
World Record	72.28	Barbora Špotáková	CZE	Stuttgart, Germany	13 September 2008
Games Record	60.72	Sunette Viljoen	RSA	Melbourne, Australia	19 March 2006

== Results ==
Rank	Athlete	1	2	3	4	5	6	Result	Notes
1st place, gold medalist(s)	Sunette Viljoen (RSA)	55.84	60.30	62.34	x	x	60.92	62.34	GR
2nd place, silver medalist(s)	Kim Mickle (AUS)	60.25	60.83	x	58.63	60.90	x	60.90	SB
3rd place, bronze medalist(s)	Justine Robbeson (RSA)	59.51	60.03	57.95	x	55.81	x	60.03	
4	Laura Whittingham (ENG)	51.34	47.69	55.26	x	51.35	58.61	58.61	
5	Kathryn Mitchell (AUS)	x	x	54.25	51.64	51.27	x	54.25	
6	Kateema Riettie (JAM)	52.53	x	53.80	50.31	51.62	x	53.80	
7	Nadeeka Lakmali (SRI)	53.16	53.36	51.29	45.13	48.00	45.95	53.36	SB
8	Saraswathi Sundaram (IND)	50.01	51.51	50.38	48.61	47.99	42.85	51.51	SB
9	Suman Devi (IND)	46.66	51.19	50.93				51.19	SB
10	Laverne Eve (BAH)	47.98	50.40	48.87				50.40	
11	Renalda Alexandra Nastas Tsissiou (CYP)	46.17	49.64	x				49.64	
12	Annet Kabasindi (UGA)	46.11	46.26	47.70				47.70	
13	Izzy Jeffs (ENG)	44.33	46.31	46.09				46.31	
14	Tammilee Kae-Patricia Kerr (JAM)	46.06	x	x				46.06	
