= Kelly Morgan (athlete) =

British javelin thrower and boxer

Personal information
- Nationality: British (English)
- Born: 17 June 1980 (age 46) Dover, England
- Height: 5 ft 10 in (178 cm)
- Weight: 72.5 kg (160 lb)

Sport
- Sport: Javelin throw; Netball; Professional boxing
- Weight class: Middleweight
- Club: Windsor, Slough, Eton and Hounslow AC

Achievements and titles
- Personal best: Javelin: 64.87 m (2002)
Medal record
Javelin throw
Representing England
Commonwealth Games
Bronze medal – third place	2002	Javelin throw

Kelly Morgan (born 17 June 1980) is a former British boxer and athlete. She won the WBC female silver middleweight belt in June 2016. Prior to taking up boxing, she represented the England development team in netball, and represented England and the Great Britain in the javelin throw.

== Sports ==
=== Javelin ===
Morgan won the English schools junior girls title in 1994, then a year later at age 15 won the AAA under 20 title, resulting in her being called up to the British junior squad. Injury caused her to miss two seasons, but she retook the AAA under 20 title in 1998, and represented the UK in the World Junior Championships.

In 1999, with a new model of javelin being introduced, Morgan took the UK junior record with a throw of 54.61 m (179.2 ft), going on to win the AAA senior title in 2000, when she also broke two British under 23 records. Morgan became the British javelin champion for the second time after winning the AAA title at the 2002 AAA Championships.

Further injury held Morgan back, but she nonetheless represented the United Kingdom in the 2002 European Athletics Championships and England in the 2002 Commonwealth Games, where she achieved third place. 2002 was by far Morgan's best year for javelin: she broke multiple records, including with her personal best of 64.87 m (212.8 ft), and at one point ranked second in the world.

Morgan required multiple cortisone injections to get through the 2002 season, and had an operation to shave away part of the acromion process towards the end of that year. That operation led to a secondary problem, however, and as a result she did not compete in 2003. Instead she intended to focus on the 2004 Olympic Games, but was unable to overcome her injuries to be able to compete.

=== Netball ===
In 2001, Morgan competed for the English development team in netball, playing against the world champion Australian team.

=== Boxing ===
Morgan started amateur boxing while in the British Army in 2007, but only had a small number of fights due to Army commitments. However, in July 2015, she switched to professional boxing, winning her first five bouts, including against world number two Szilvia Szabados, and claiming the World Boxing Council's silver middleweight belt.

Morgan has been looking to challenge for a world title since July 2016, and after a "very frustrating" time attempting to arrange a title fight, in January 2017 the World Boxing Council ordered its super-middleweight champion, Nikki Adler, to face Morgan. In February 2017, the WBC told Morgan she could fight for the "vacant title", with her manager stating it was unclear whether Adler had vacated the title or been stripped of it. However, before she was able to fight for the title, Morgan was forced to retire from boxing due to a sparring injury leading to fourth nerve palsy.

== Personal life ==
Morgan was born in Dover and brought up in Durrington, Wiltshire. The daughter of Sarah, who played netball, and Russ, an amateur boxer and Army physical training instructor, she tried a large number of sports before finding a niche with the javelin.

Outside of sport, Morgan was in the Royal Air Force until 2000, when she left to concentrate on javelin. At the end of 2001 she rejoined the armed forces, this time in the British Army, where she served until 2012, reaching the rank of sergeant in the Royal Army Physical Training Corps.

Between leaving the army and beginning her boxing career, Morgan spent some time travelling, including working as a personal trainer in Qatar.

== Results ==
=== Javelin ===
Year	Competition	Venue	Position	Notes
Representing Great Britain and England
1998	World Junior Championships	Annecy, France	18th (q)	46.58 m (old spec.)
2002	Commonwealth Games	Manchester, United Kingdom	3rd	57.09 m
2002	European Championships	Munich, Germany	12th	53.89 m

=== Boxing ===
5 Wins (1 knockout)
Res.	Record	Opponent	Type	Rd., Time	Date	Location	Notes
Win	5–0	(Bulgaria) Borislava Goranova	PTS	6 (6×2)	16 September 2016	Sir David English Sport Centre, Bournemouth	
Win	4–0	(Germany) Lisa Cielas	UD	8 (8×2)	10 June 2016	Grand Leisure Centre, Swindon	WBC Silver female middleweight title fight
Win	3–0	(Hungary) Szilvia Szabados	PTS	6 (6×2)	20 December 2015	Grand Leisure Centre, Swindon	
Win	2–0	(Hungary) Melinda Lazar	PTS	6 (6×2)	24 October 2015	Oasis Leisure Centre, Swindon	
Win	1–0	(Hungary) Klaudia Vigh	TKO	1 (6×2), 1:34	18 July 2015	Bath Pavilion, Bath	Professional debut
