= 2018 African Championships in Athletics – Women's javelin throw =

The women's javelin throw event at the 2018 African Championships in Athletics was held on 4 August in Asaba, Nigeria.

== Results ==
Rank	Athlete	Nationality	#1	#2	#3	#4	#5	#6	Result	Notes
1st place, gold medalist(s)	Kelechi Nwanaga	Nigeria	49.22	x	51.81	53.67	56.96	51.55	56.96	
2nd place, silver medalist(s)	Jo-Ane van Dyk	South Africa	52.21	50.81	53.72	51.96	53.11	53.29	53.72	
3rd place, bronze medalist(s)	Josephine Lalam	Uganda	51.33	48.98	48.59	44.37	46.58	48.60	51.33	
4	Damacline Nyekereri	Kenya	31.05	45.78	50.67	50.94	x	43.24	50.94	
5	Selma Rosun	Mauritius	x	49.99	50.65	48.98	48.73	x	50.65	
6	Lucy Aber	Uganda	45.28	45.05	x	49.39	48.53	46.65	49.39	
7	Kenifing Traore	Mali	45.65	45.76	46.40	46.08	48.86	48.26	48.86	
8	Bizunesh Tadesse	Ethiopia	43.15	42.39	41.74	43.66	40.68	41.47	43.66	
