= Athletics at the 2007 All-Africa Games – Women's javelin throw =

The women's javelin throw at the 2007 All-Africa Games was held on July 20.

== Results ==
Rank	Athlete	Nationality	Result	Notes
1st place, gold medalist(s)	Justine Robbeson	South Africa	58.09	
2nd place, silver medalist(s)	Lindy Leveau	Seychelles	56.49	
3rd place, bronze medalist(s)	Sunette Viljoen	South Africa	54.46	
4	Miriam Mukulama	Zambia	50.55	NR
5	Cecilia Kiplangat	Kenya	49.74	
6	Annet Kabasindi	Uganda	49.61	
7	Sorochukwu Ihuefo	Nigeria	45.44	
8	Monique Djikada	Cameroon	45.10	
9	Zehra Bedrane	Algeria	40.20	
