= 2006 African Championships in Athletics – Women's javelin throw =

The women's javelin throw event at the 2006 African Championships in Athletics was held at the Stade Germain Comarmond on August 12.

== Results ==
Rank	Name	Nationality	#1	#2	#3	#4	#5	#6	Result	Notes
1st place, gold medalist(s)	Justine Robbeson	South Africa	48.85	56.84	60.60	x	55.97	x	60.60	
2nd place, silver medalist(s)	Sunette Viljoen	South Africa	55.64	x	54.01	x	43.04	49.29	55.64	
3rd place, bronze medalist(s)	Lindy Leveau	Seychelles	50.90	54.41	x	–	–	–	54.41	
4	Cecilia Kiplangat	Kenya	41.58	49.45	47.29	48.61	49.96	48.03	49.96	
5	Hana'a Ramadhan Omar	Egypt	49.90	44.93	47.12	42.57	45.77	42.29	49.90	
6	Annet Kabasindi	Uganda	40.30	x	41.47	45.29	44.65	43.69	45.29	
7	Bernadette Ravina	Mauritius	x	x	42.78	x	x	46.11	46.11	
