= Annika Marie Fuchs =

German javelin thrower

Personal information
- Born: 29 April 1997 (age 29) Cottbus, Germany
- Height: 1.76 m (5 ft 9 in)
- Weight: 67 kg (148 lb)

Sport
- Sport: Athletics
- Event: Javelin throw
- Club: LC Potsdam
- Coached by: Ralf Lauenroth; Burkhard Looks

Annika-Marie Fuchs (born 29 April 1997) is a German athlete specialising in the javelin throw. She represented her country at the 2019 World Championships without qualifying for the final. In addition, she won a gold medal at the 2019 European U23 Championships in Gävle.

Her personal best in the event is 63.68 metres set in Gävle in 2019.

In 2019, she won the bronze medal in the team event at the 2019 European Games held in Minsk, Belarus.

== International competitions ==
Year	Competition	Venue	Position	Event	Notes
Representing Germany
2016	World U20 Championships	Bydgoszcz, Poland	41st (q)	Javelin throw	37.60 m
2019	European U23 Championships	Gävle, Sweden	1st	Javelin throw	63.68 m
2019	World Championships	Doha, Qatar	21st (q)	Javelin throw	58.16 m
2022	World Championships	Eugene, United States	12th	Javelin throw	56.46 m
2022	European Championships	Munich, Germany	11th	Javelin throw	54.52 m
