= Athletics at the 2018 Commonwealth Games – Women's javelin throw =

Women's javelin throw at the 2018 Commonwealth Games
- Venue: Carrara Stadium
- Dates: 11 April
- Competitors: 8 from 7 nations
- Winning distance: 68.92 m GR

Medalists
gold medal	Kathryn Mitchell	Australia
silver medal	Kelsey-Lee Roberts	Australia
bronze medal	Sunette Viljoen	South Africa

The women's javelin throw at the 2018 Commonwealth Games, as part of the athletics programme, took place in the Carrara Stadium on 11 April 2018.

== Records ==
Before this competition, the world and games records were as follows:

World record	Barbora Špotáková (CZE)	72.28 m	Stuttgart, Germany	13 September 2008
Games record	Kim Mickle (AUS)	65.96 m	Glasgow, Scotland	30 July 2014

== Schedule ==
The schedule was as follows:

Date	Time	Round
Wednesday 11 April 2018	19:15	Final

All times are Australian Eastern Standard Time (UTC+10).

== Results ==
With eight entrants, the event was held as a straight final.

=== Final ===
Rank	Name	#1	#2	#3	#4	#5	#6	Result	Notes
1st place, gold medalist(s)	Kathryn Mitchell (AUS)	68.92	x	x	62.40	68.14	x	68.92	GR, AR
2nd place, silver medalist(s)	Kelsey-Lee Roberts (AUS)	60.81	59.09	59.06	55.79	59.71	63.89	63.89	
3rd place, bronze medalist(s)	Sunette Viljoen (RSA)	62.08	56.61	58.69	56.57	x	57.38	62.08	
4	Elizabeth Gleadle (CAN)	57.53	55.79	x	59.85	x	56.96	59.85	
5	Dilhani Lekamge (SRI)	51.13	53.58	56.02	53.73	49.55	53.82	56.02	
6	Kelechi Nwanaga (NGR)	53.17	x	51.59	53.16	x	49.31	53.17	
7	Selma Rosun (MRI)	48.85	x	48.93	49.09	47.75	47.79	49.09	
8	Josephine Lalam (UGA)	x	x	x	46.97	x	48.92	48.92	
