= Esra Türkmen =

Turkish javelin thrower

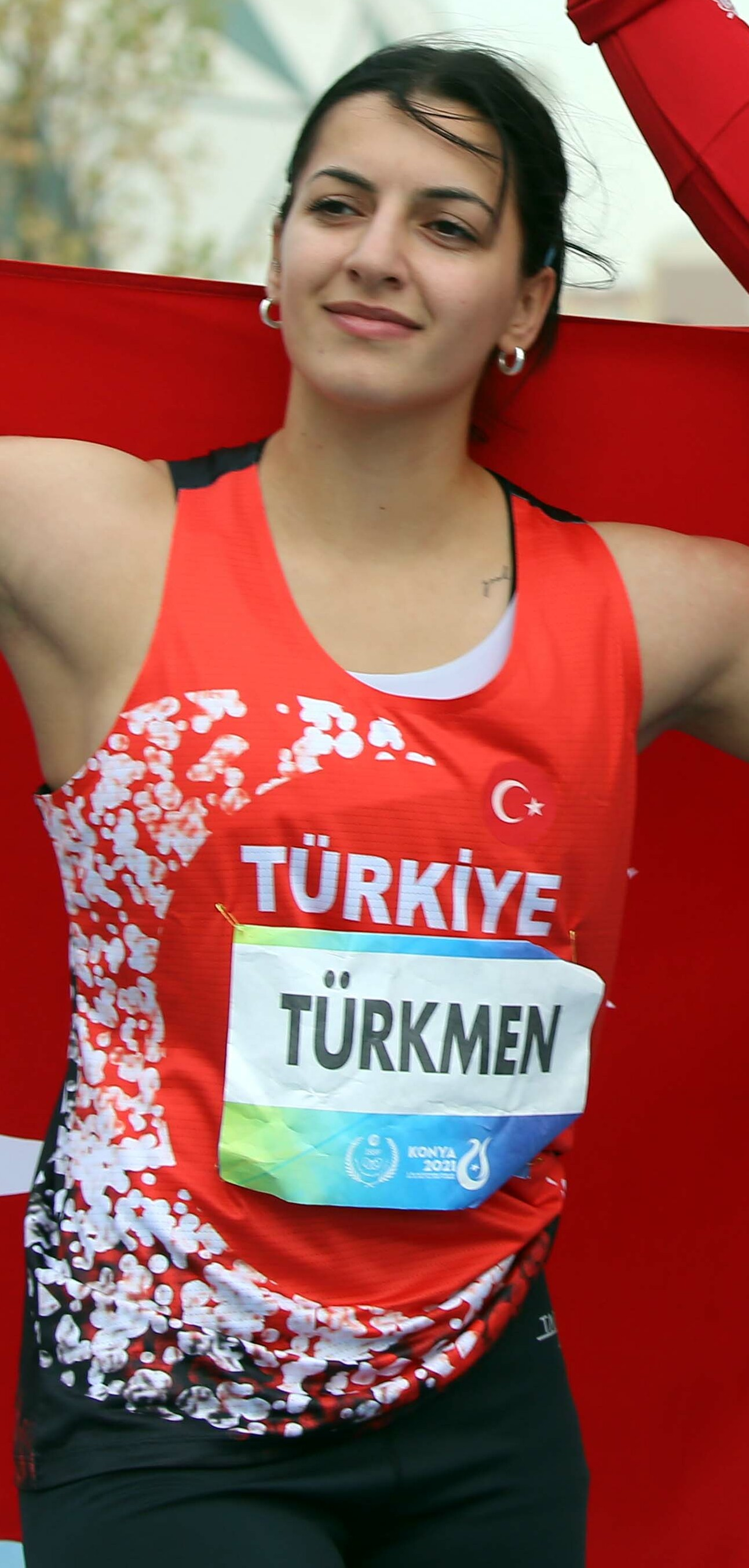
- Esra Türkmen (2022)

Personal information
- Born: 20 January 2002 (age 24) Turkey
- Education: Alanya Alaaddin Keykubat University

Sport
- Country: Turkey
- Sport: Athletics
- Event: Javelin throw
- Club: Fenerbahçe Athletics
Medal record
Representing Turkey
Summer World University Games
Gold medal – first place	2025 Rhine-Ruhr	Javelin throw
Islamic Solidarity Games
Gold medal – first place	2021 Konya	Javelin throw
Silver medal – second place	2025 Riyadh	Javelin throw

Esra Türkmen (born 20 January 2002) is a Turkish javelin thrower. She won gold medals at the 2019 European U20 Champion Clubs Cup and in athletics at the 2025 Summer World University Games.

== Career ==
Türkmen first represented Turkey internationally in 2018, competing at the 2018 European Athletics U18 Championships but failing to make the finals. She was 12th in the javelin throw at the 2021 European Athletics U23 Championships.

In the javelin throw at the 2024 European Athletics Championships, Türkmen placed 28th in qualification.

In May 2025, Türkmen placed 2nd at the UNG Meeting in Tashkent, Uzbekistan. She won her first global gold medal later that year in the javelin at the 2025 World University Games.
