= Athletics at the 2003 All-Africa Games – Women's javelin throw =

The women's javelin throw event at the 2003 All-Africa Games was held on October 13.

== Results ==
Rank	Name	Nationality	Result	Notes
1st place, gold medalist(s)	Aïda Sellam	Tunisia	54.58	
2nd place, silver medalist(s)	Lindy Leveaux	Seychelles	53.23	
3rd place, bronze medalist(s)	Sunette Viljoen	South Africa	51.68	
4	Cecilia Kiplangat	Kenya	50.88	
5	Sorochukwu Ihuefo	Nigeria	50.58	
6	Annet Kabasindi	Uganda	48.36	
7	Hana'a Ramadhan Omar	Egypt	47.24	
8	Rosemary Onochie	Nigeria	44.17	
9	Germaine Dakouo	Mali	39.86	
10	Sónia Borges	Cape Verde	31.69	
