= Vita Barbić =

Croatian athlete (born 2007)

Personal information
- Born: 13 August 2007 (age 19)

Sport
- Sport: Athletics
- Events: Javelin throw, Discus throw

Achievements and titles
- Personal bests: Javelin: 60.71 m NU20R (Zagreb, 2026); Discus: 50.08 m (Karlovac, 2026); Shot put: 13.25 m (Split, 2026)
Medal record
Women's athletics
Representing Croatia
World U20 Championships
| Silver medal – second place | 2026 Eugene | Javelin throw |
European U20 Championships
| Gold medal – first place | 2025 Tampere | Javelin |
European U18 Championships
| Gold medal – first place | 2024 Banská Bystrica | Javelin |
| Bronze medal – third place | 2024 Banská Bystrica | Discus |
European Youth Olympic Festival
| Gold medal – first place | 2023 Maribor | Javelin |

Vita Barbić (born 13 August 2007) is a Croatian javelin and discus thrower. She won silver in javelin at the 2026 U20 World Championship, gold in the javelin at the 2025 European Athletics U20 Championships, and gold in the javelin and bronze in the discus at the 2024 European Athletics U18 Championships.

== Early life and education ==
She started training in athletics at the age of six years-old after being encouraged to try it by her older sister. She hugely admired Sandra Perković when she was growing up. She was a student at the Vladimir Prelog School of Natural Sciences in Zagreb. After completing high school in 2026, she enrolled in a psychology program at the Catholic University of Croatia in Zagreb.

== Career ==
She won the javelin throw at the 2023 European Youth Summer Olympic Festival (EYOF) in Maribor, with a throw of 60.48 metres, which set a new EYOF record in the javelin throw (500 g). She won the Croatian national junior titles in the discus throw (43.50m) and the javelin throw where she also threw a new personal best of 52.97m, in June 2023. She was also just three centimetres from a third gold as she won the silver medal in the shot put with a new personal record of 12.58m. She placed fourth in the javelin at the 2023 European Athletics U20 Championships competing as a 15-year-old.

At the 2024 Balkan U18 Championships in Maribor, Barbic moved top of the European U18 list with 57.81m throw in the 500g javelin.

She won gold in the javelin, and bronze in the discus, at the 2024 European Athletics U18 Championships. She finished fourth in the javelin at the 2024 World Athletics U20 Championships in Lima, Peru in August 2024. The European Athletics Federation nominated her for the European Young Athlete of the Year award for 2024.

She won the gold medal in the javelin at the 2025 European Athletics U20 Championships in Tampere, Finland, in August 2025. Her best throw was 55.26m in the final round of the competition with the title already won.

Barbic set a new personal best and national under-20 record of 60.71 metres in June 2026 in Zagreb. At the U20 World Championship at the Hayward Field in Eugene in August 2026 she became a vice-champion (56.60 m). She competed at the European Championship a week later in Birmingham, placing 26th in the qualifications (53.52 m).

== Personal life ==
Her older sister, Klara, is a high and triple jumper who broke the Cristian junior high jump record and began studying and competing for Harvard University in 2023.

In January 2025, she appeared in European Athletics documentary series My Fire.

In 2026, she received the Dražen Petrović Award for Croatia's best young female athlete, presented by the Croatian Olympic Committee.
