= Justine Robbeson =

South African javelin thrower

Medal record

Women's athletics

Representing South Africa

All-Africa Games
Gold medal – first place	2007 Algiers	Javelin throw
Gold medal – first place	2011 Maputo	Javelin throw
Silver medal – second place	2003 Abuja	Heptathlon

African Championships
Gold medal – first place	2006 Bambous	Javelin throw
Silver medal – second place	2010 Nairobi	Javelin throw
Silver medal – second place	2012 Porto-Novo	Javelin throw

Afro-Asian Games
Silver medal – second place	2003 Hyderabad	Heptathlon

Commonwealth Games
Bronze medal – third place	2010 New Delhi	Javelin throw

Universiade
Bronze medal – third place	2005 İzmir	Javelin throw
Bronze medal – third place	2011 Shenzhen	Javelin throw

World Cup
Bronze medal – third place	2006 Athens	Javelin throw

World Junior Championships
Gold medal – first place	2004 Grosseto	Heptathlon

World Youth Championships
Gold medal – first place	2001 Debrecen	Javelin throw

Justine Gail Robbeson (born 15 May 1985 in Benoni) is a South African athlete who specialised in the javelin throw. She previously competed in the heptathlon, achieving a personal best of 5868 in 2004. Justine attended Springs Girls' High School. She completed her BSc degree in Nutrition and Human Movement Sciences, BSc Honours degree in Nutrition, and MSc degree in Sports Nutrition at North-West University, Potchefstroom, where she was a member of the athletics club coached by Terseus Liebenberg.

Her personal best javelin throw is 63.49 metres, achieved in February 2008 in Potchefstroom. It was an African record until July 2009, when her compatriot Sunette Viljoen threw 65.46 metres at the qualifying round of the 2009 Summer Universiade in Belgrade, Serbia.

== Achievements ==
Year	Competition	Venue	Position	Event	Notes
Representing South Africa
2001	World Youth Championships	Debrecen, Hungary	2nd	Javelin throw	51.54 m
2002	World Schools Gymnasiade	Caen, France	2nd	Long jump	
2003	All Africa Games	Abuja, Nigeria	2nd	Heptathlon	5697 pts
2003	Afro-Asian Games	Hyderabad, India	2nd	Heptathlon	5587 pts
2004	World Junior Championships	Grosseto, Italy	1st	Heptathlon	5868 pts
2005	Universiade	İzmir, Turkey	3rd	Javelin throw	58.70 m
2006	African Championships	Bambous, Mauritius	1st	Javelin throw	60.60 m
2006	World Cup	Athens, Greece	3rd	Javelin throw	61.38 m
2007	All Africa Games	Algiers, Algeria	1st	Javelin throw	58.09 m
2008	Olympic Games	Beijing, China	13th (q)	Javelin throw	59.63 m
2010	Commonwealth Games	New Delhi, India	3rd	Javelin throw	60.03 m
2011	Universiade	Shenzhen, China	3rd	Javelin throw	59.78 m
2011	World Championships	Daegu, South Korea	19th (q)	Javelin throw	58.08 m
2011	All-Africa Games	Maputo, Mozambique	1st	Javelin throw	55.33 m
2012	African Championships	Porto-Novo, Benin	2nd	Javelin throw	52.81 m
2012	Olympic Games	London, United Kingdom	13th (q)	Javelin throw	59.63 m
