= Kelechi Nwanaga =

Nigerian javelin thrower

Medal record

Women's athletics

Representing Nigeria

African Championships
Gold medal – first place	2018 Asaba	Javelin throw

Kelechi Promise Nwanaga (born 24 December 1997) is a Nigerian javelin thrower.

Nwanaga competed for the UMBC Retrievers track and field and Florida State Seminoles track and field teams in the NCAA.

As a junior she won the silver medal at the 2015 African Junior Championships. She won the gold medal at the 2015 African Games, finished fourth at the 2016 African Championships, sixth at the 2018 Commonwealth Games, won the gold medal at the 2018 African Championships and defended her gold medal at the 2019 African Games.

Nwanaga personal best throw is 58.15 metres, achieved in July 2017 in Ozoro, setting a new Nigerian record.
