= Unni Helland =

Norwegian athlete (1932–2019)

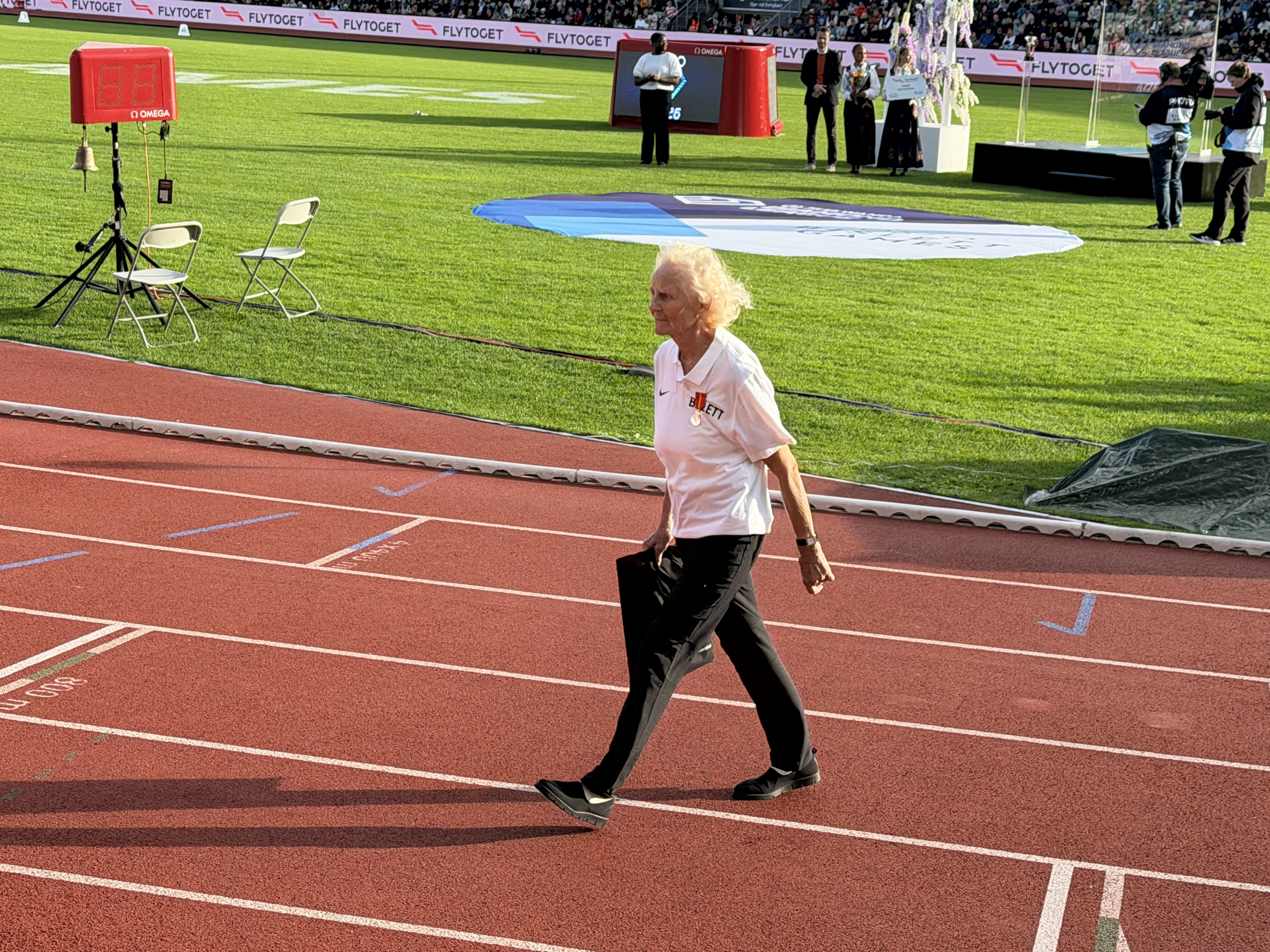
Helland after receiving the King's Medal of Merit at the 2026 Bislett Games.

Unni Helland, née Fjeldseth (born 26 January 1942) is a Norwegian athletics coach and former long jumper.

== Personal life ==
She hails from Grinder. In September 1960 she married Olympic long-distance runner Thor Helland. They would both dedicate their lives to athletics coaching.

== Athletics career ==
She moved to Oslo and joined the club IL i BUL at the age of 16 in 1958. She won the silver medal in long jump at the 1962 Norwegian Championships. Her lifetime best jump was 5.27 metres, achieved in July 1966 at Bislett stadion. She also took five national titles in relay.

== Coaching career ==
Ending her athletics career in the late 1960s, she took up coaching in IL i BUL. Serving for decades, she earned recognition for her coaching prowess as well a "motherly" demeanor, earning monikers such as "mother of BUL" and "mother of athletics". BUL established itself as of Norway's most prominent clubs; with Helland as coach, in 1980 BUL became the second club to win the Holmenkollstafetten road relay for women, following a five-year victory spell for IL Tyrving. Within elite athletics, Helland has also been co-credited with the discoveries of Norway's 100 metres record holder for both men and women, Ezinne Okparaebo and Jaysuma Saidy Ndure, as well as Folake Akinyemi. She was also employed by the Oslo District Association of Athletics for the last 25 years of her professional career.

Helland was given honorary membership of IL i BUL in 1983. In 2008, she was awarded the Ildsjelprisen by Oslo District Association of Sports. Shortly after, she was chosen for the Olympic torch relay in China. In 2009, the Norwegian Athletics Association named her as the national winner of the European Athletics Women's Leadership Awards. In 2024 she received another ildsjel of the year award, this time from the Norwegian Athletics Association. Still coaching at the age of 84, during the 2026 Bislett Games she was decorated with the King's Medal of Merit in silver.
