= Arianne Duarte Morais =

Norwegian athletics competitor (born 1999)

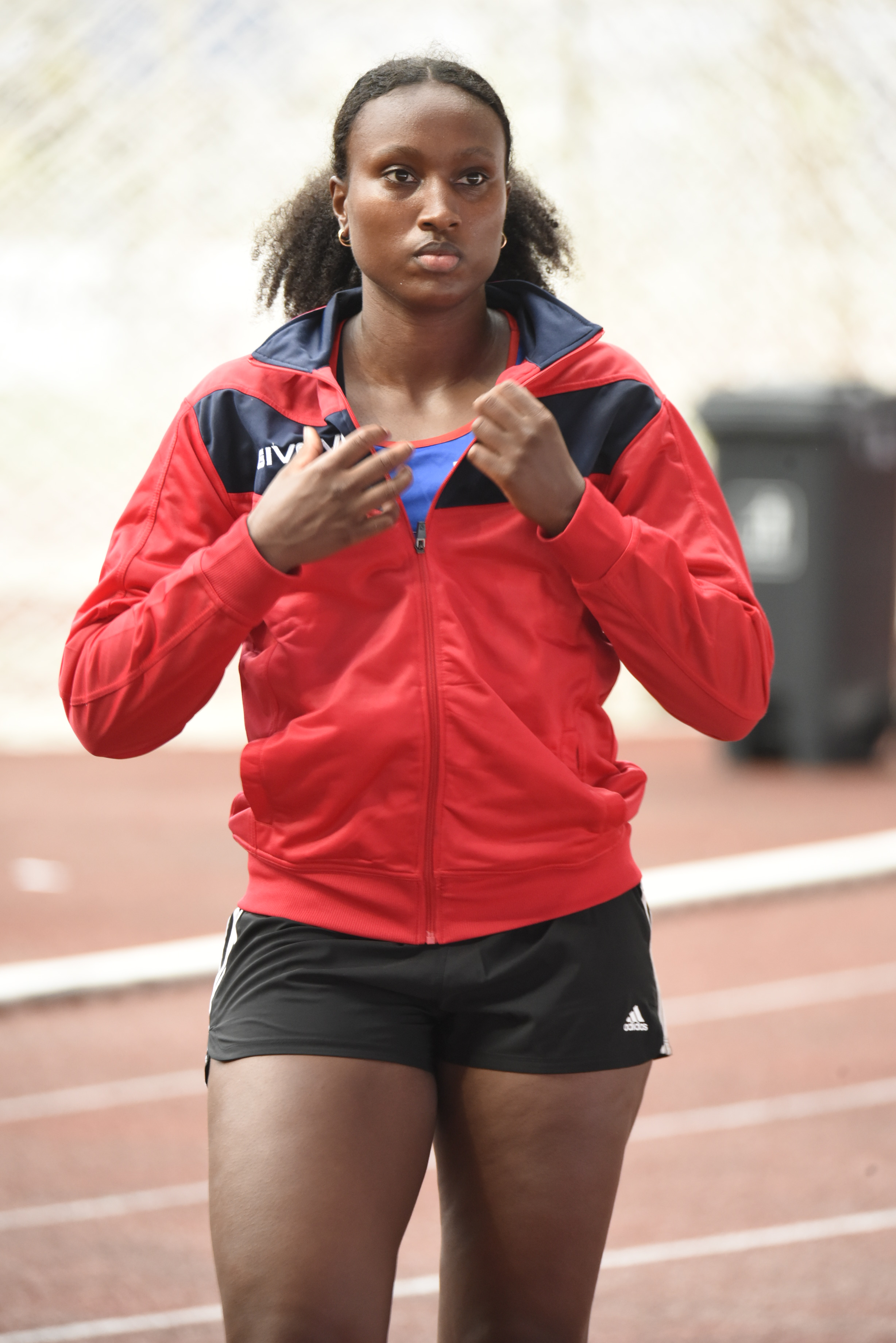
Arianne Duarte Morais at the 2024 African Championships.

Arianne Duarte Morais (born 23 May 1999) is a javelin thrower. Born in Norway, she represents Cape Verde internationally.

Hailing from Ammerud in Oslo, she competed in various sports, most prominently handball for Nit/Hak and athletics for IL i BUL. Convinced by long-time coach Unni Helland to try the javelin throw, Morais was coached by Jan Dubowski and eventually set Norwegian age records. Competing internationally in the age-specific categories, she won the bronze medal at the 2015 European Youth Olympic Festival and the gold medal at the 2016 European Youth Championships. As she won that gold medal she broke the 60-metre barrier with the 500 gram javelin, throwing 60.89 metres, and also broke the 50-metre barrier with the senior 600 gram equipment, throwing 50.97 at the Norwegian U20 Championships in the same year. The next year she improved to 52.55 metres.

In 2021, Arianne Duarte Morais re-emerged as a college athlete for the Florida Gators. Throwing 55.13 metres that year, she competed at the 2022 and 2023 NCAA Division I Championships before winning silver at the 2023 Norwegian Championships. She also improved to 57.38 at the 2023 Mt. SAC Relays and 57.61 at the NCAA Division I West First Rounds. She had changed universities to the University of Texas at El Paso in 2022, competing for the UTEP Miners.

In 2024 she recorded two more competitions in the 57-metre range, and finished eleventh at the 2024 NCAA Division I Championships. Morais subsequently competed for Cape Verde at the 2024 African Championships, and initially finished fourth, but was ultimately disqualified. Her transfer of eligibility was not ratified by World Athletics at the time, but she was declared eligible to start for Cape Verde in June 2025. She returned to the African scene in 2026 to win the silver medal at the 2026 African Championships, shortly after followed by a bronze medal at the 2026 Ibero-American Championships.
