= Josephine Joyce Lalam =

Ugandan javelin thrower (born 2000)

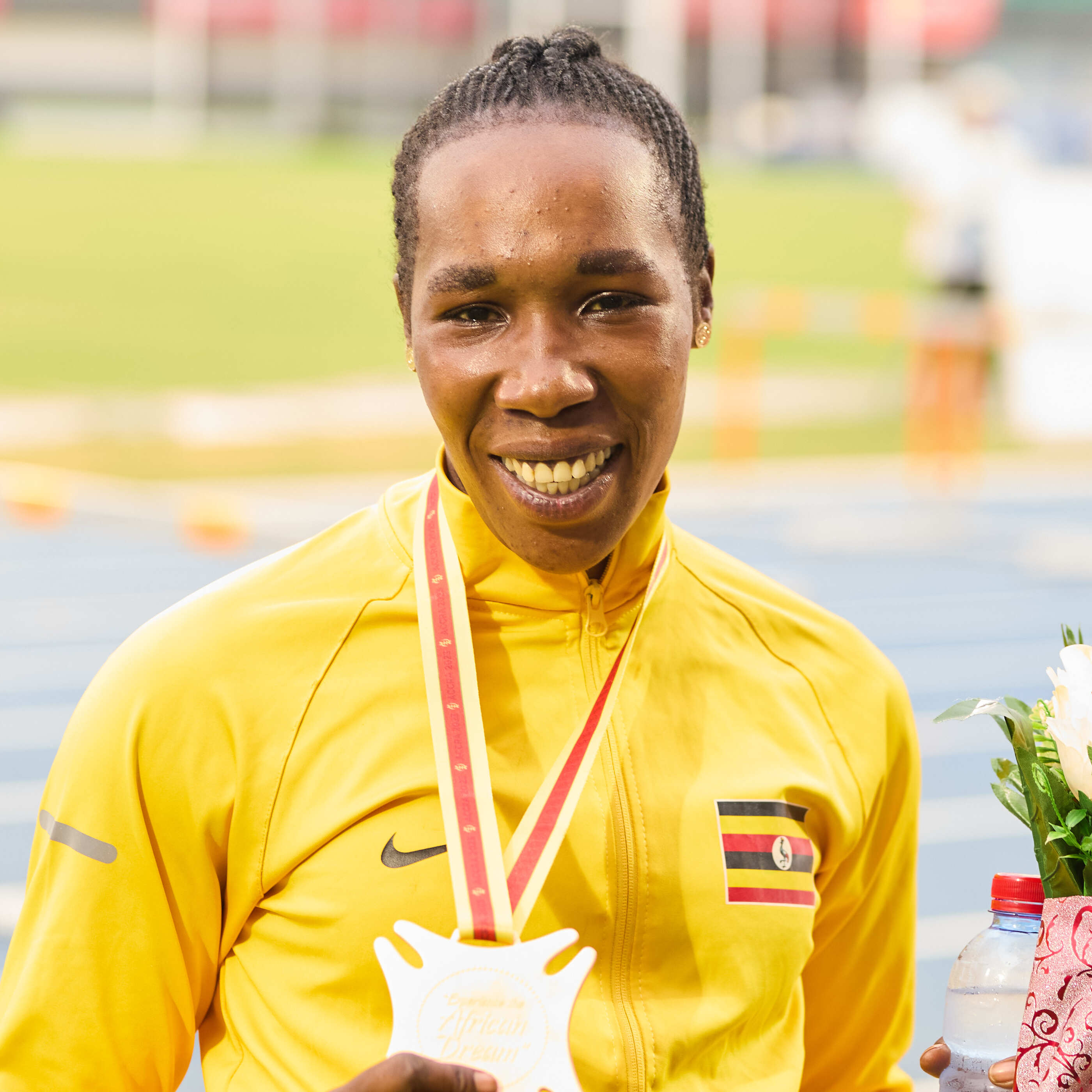
- Lalam at the 2023 African Games

Personal information
- Born: 12 November 2000 (age 25)
- Education: Gombe secondary school

Sport
- Country: Uganda
- Sport: Athletics
- Event: Javelin throw
Medal record
Women's athletics
Representing Uganda
African Games
Bronze medal – third place	2023 Accra	Javelin throw
African Championships
Bronze medal – third place	2018 Asaba	Javelin throw
Bronze medal – third place	2024 Douala	Javelin throw

Josephine Joyce Lalam (born 12 November 2000) is a Ugandan javelin thrower.

== Career ==
She finished eighth at the 2018 Commonwealth Games, won the bronze medal at the 2018 African Championships, finished fourth at the 2019 African Games and won the gold medal at the 2019 African U20 Championships. She was also the gold medalist at the 2016 East and Central Africa Junior Athletics Championships.

Her personal best throw is 53.39 metres, achieved at the 2019 African Games in Rabat. This is the Ugandan record.
