= Sunette Viljoen =

South African sportswoman

Sunette Viljoen-Louw
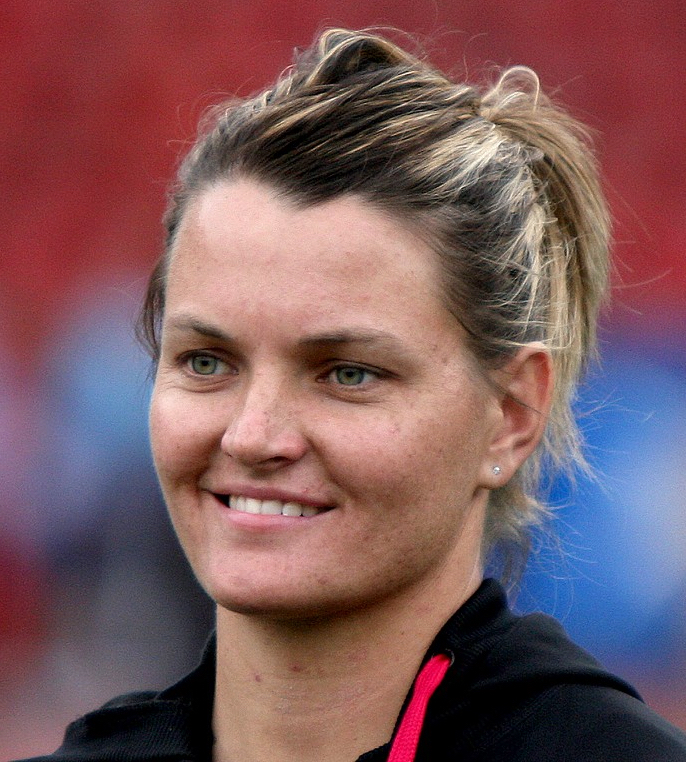

Personal information
- Full name: Sunette Stella Viljoen-Louw
- Born: 6 October 1983 (age 43); Rustenburg, Transvaal, South Africa
- Batting: Right-handed
- Bowling: Right-arm medium
- Role: Batter

International information
- National side: South Africa (2000–2002)
- Only Test (cap 36): 19 March 2002 v India
- ODI debut (cap 26): 20 June 2000 v England
- Last ODI: 16 March 2002 v India

Domestic team information
- Years: Team
- 2002/03: North West
- 2004/05: Gauteng
- 2006/07: Limpopo
- 2021/22–2022/23: Northerns
- 2022/23–present: Central Gauteng

Career statistics
Competition	WTest	WODI
Matches	1	17
Runs scored	88	198
Batting average	44.00	16.50
100s/50s	0/1	0/1
Top score	71	54*
Balls bowled	–	228
Wickets	–	5
Bowling average	–	33.20
5 wickets in innings	–	0
10 wickets in match	–	0
Best bowling	–	3/27
Catches/stumpings	0/–	3/–
- Source: Cricinfo, 16 February 2022

Sunette Viljoen
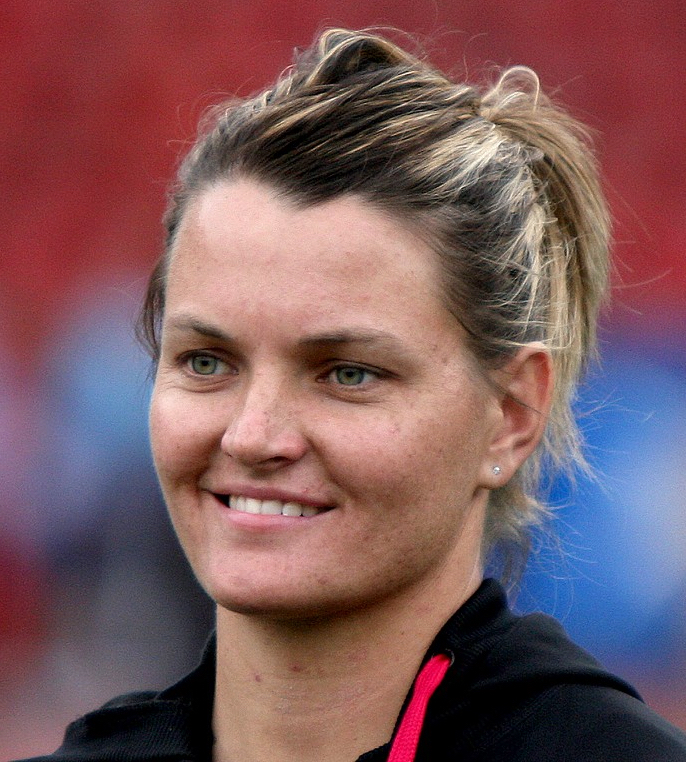
- Sunette Viljoen in 2010

Personal information
- Full name: Sunette Stella Viljoen
- Born: 6 October 1983 (age 43) Rustenburg, South Africa
- Height: 1.70 m (5 ft 7 in)
- Weight: 72 kg (159 lb)

Sport
- Country: South Africa
- Sport: Athletics
- Event: Javelin throw
Medal record
Women's athletics
Representing South Africa
Olympic Games
Silver medal – second place	2016 Rio de Janeiro	Javelin throw
World Championships
Silver medal – second place	2011 Daegu	Javelin throw
Bronze medal – third place	2015 Beijing	Javelin throw
Commonwealth Games
Gold medal – first place	2006 Melbourne	Javelin throw
Gold medal – first place	2010 New Delhi	Javelin throw
Silver medal – second place	2014 Glasgow	Javelin throw
Bronze medal – third place	2018 Gold Coast	Javelin throw
African Games
Bronze medal – third place	2003 Abuja	Javelin throw
Bronze medal – third place	2007 Algiers	Javelin throw
Bronze medal – third place	2019 Rabat	Javelin throw
African Championships
Gold medal – first place	2004 Brazzaville	Javelin throw
Gold medal – first place	2008 Addis Ababa	Javelin throw
Gold medal – first place	2010 Nairobi	Javelin throw
Gold medal – first place	2014 Marrakesh	Javelin throw
Gold medal – first place	2016 Durban	Javelin throw
Silver medal – second place	2006 Bambous	Javelin throw
Afro-Asian Games
Gold medal – first place	2003 Hyderabad	Javelin throw
Universiade
Gold medal – first place	2009 Belgrade	Javelin throw
Gold medal – first place	2011 Shenzhen	Javelin throw
Continental Cup
Gold medal – first place	2010 Split	Javelin throw
Silver medal – second place	2014 Marrakesh	Javelin throw
- Updated on 16 September 2019

Sunette Stella Viljoen-Louw, née Viljoen (born 6 October 1983), is a South African sportswoman who has represented her country in both cricket and athletics. In athletics, she competes as a javelin thrower and has won an Olympic silver medal (in 2016) and two Commonwealth Games gold medals (in 2006 and 2010), as well as medals in various other competitions. As a cricketer, she represented the South African national team between 2000 and 2002, including at the 2000 World Cup in New Zealand.

== Early life and cricket career ==
Viljoen was born in Rustenburg, Transvaal (present-day North West). She attended Die Hoërskool Rustenburg and her first language is Afrikaans. Viljoen made her international cricket debut for South Africa in June 2000, in a One Day International (ODI) match against England. She was 17 years and 10 days old at the time, becoming the youngest woman to play ODI cricket for South Africa (a record since broken by several others). Later in the year, Viljoen was selected in the South African squad for the 2000 Women's World Cup in New Zealand. A right-handed all-rounder, she appeared in all eight of her team's matches at the tournament, and against England scored 54 not out, which was to be the highest score of her ODI career. Against Ireland in a later match, she took 3/27 from ten overs, the best bowling figures of her international career. Viljoen's final international matches for South Africa came in March 2002, in a home series against India. She played four ODIs and the only Test match of her career, in which she scored 17 runs in the first innings and 71 in the second (the third-highest score of the match).

In December 2021, Viljoen made a return to cricket, joining Northerns with the aim of playing for her country again.

== Athletics career ==
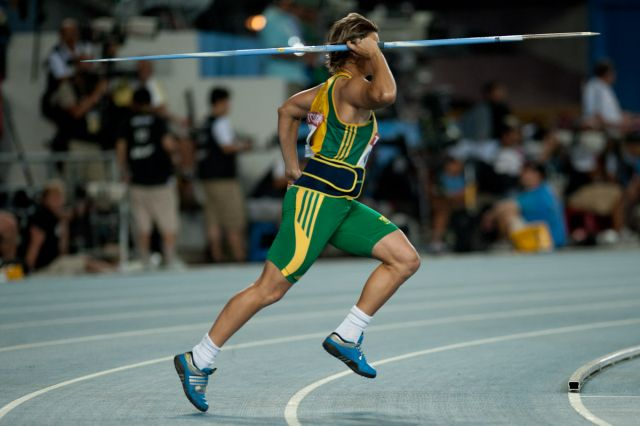
Viljoen at the 2011 IAAF World Athletics Championships in Daegu, South Korea

In 2007 Viljoen accidentally threw a javelin at Šebrle, a Czech athlete who was the world champion in the Decathlon at the time and the first person to pass the 9,000 point mark. The javelin pierced his right shoulder and while he made a recovery and continued to compete this incident was close to ending his career and potentially even killing him, making this a close miss. Viljoen won gold at the 2009 Summer Universiade in Belgrade, throwing 62.52 metres. At the qualifying round, she set a new African record 65.46 metres, eclipsing her compatriot Justine Robbeson's record 63.49m achieved in Potchefstroom in February 2008. Viljoen's throw was over three meters further than her previous PB of 62.24 m achieved also at the February 2008 meeting in Potchefstroom. On 14 June 2010, she broke her own record with 66.38 m at the Josef Odložil Memorial in Prague.

Viljoen won silver at the IAAF World Championships in Daegu, South Korea, on 2 September 2011. With a throw of 68.38m, she also set a new African record. She improved her own African record to 69.35m at the Adidas Grand Prix in New York City in June 2012 Having failed to reach the final at the 2004 and 2008 Summer Olympics, she finished fourth at the 2012 Summer Olympics, only 0.38 cm off the bronze medal-winning mark.

At the 2013 World Championships in Athletics, which was held in Moscow, Viljoen took only the 6th place with a mark of 63.58 meters. In 2014, she placed second at the Commonwealth Games. Later that year she won the African Championships with a result of 65.32m. Viljoen came second to Israel's Marharyta Dorozhon, at the IAAF Diamond League Bislett Games in Oslo, Norway, on 11 June 2015.

Viljoen won the silver medal in the women's javelin at the 2016 Summer Olympics in Rio de Janeiro.

== Competition record ==
Year	Competition	Venue	Position	Notes
Representing South Africa
2003	World Championships	Paris, France	16th (q)	56.78 m
2003	All-Africa Games	Abuja, Nigeria	3rd	51.68 m
2003	Afro-Asian Games	Hyderabad, India	1st	55.49 m
2004	African Championships	Brazzaville, Republic of the Congo	1st	60.13 m
2004	Olympic Games	Athens, Greece	35th (q)	54.45 m
2005	Universiade	İzmir, Turkey	12th	51.09 m
2006	Commonwealth Games	Melbourne, Australia	1st	60.72 m
2006	African Championships	Bambous, Mauritius	2nd	55.64 m
2007	All-Africa Games	Algiers, Algeria	3rd	54.46 m
2007	Universiade	Bangkok, Thailand	5th	58.39 m
2008	African Championships	Addis Ababa, Ethiopia	1st	55.17 m
2008	Olympic Games	Beijing, China	33rd (q)	55.58 m
2009	Universiade	Belgrade, Serbia	1st	62.52 m
2009	World Championships	Berlin, Germany	18th (q)	56.83 m
2010	African Championships	Nairobi, Kenya	1st	63.33 m
2010	Commonwealth Games	Delhi, India	1st	62.34 m
2011	Universiade	Shenzhen, China	1st	66.47 m
2011	World Championships	Daegu, South Korea	2nd	68.38 m
2012	Olympic Games	London, United Kingdom	4th	64.53 m
2013	World Championships	Moscow, Russia	6th	63.58 m
2014	Commonwealth Games	Glasgow, United Kingdom	2nd	63.19 m
2014	African Championships	Marrakesh, Morocco	1st	65.32 m
2015	World Championships	Beijing, China	3rd	65.79 m
2016	African Championships	Durban, South Africa	1st	64.08 m
2016	Olympic Games	Rio de Janeiro, Brazil	2nd	64.92 m
2018	Commonwealth Games	Gold Coast, Australia	3rd	62.08 m
2019	African Games	Rabat, Morocco	3rd	53.44 m
2019	World Championships	Doha, Qatar	17th (q)	60.10 m
