= Jo-Ané du Plessis =

South African javelin thrower (born 1997)

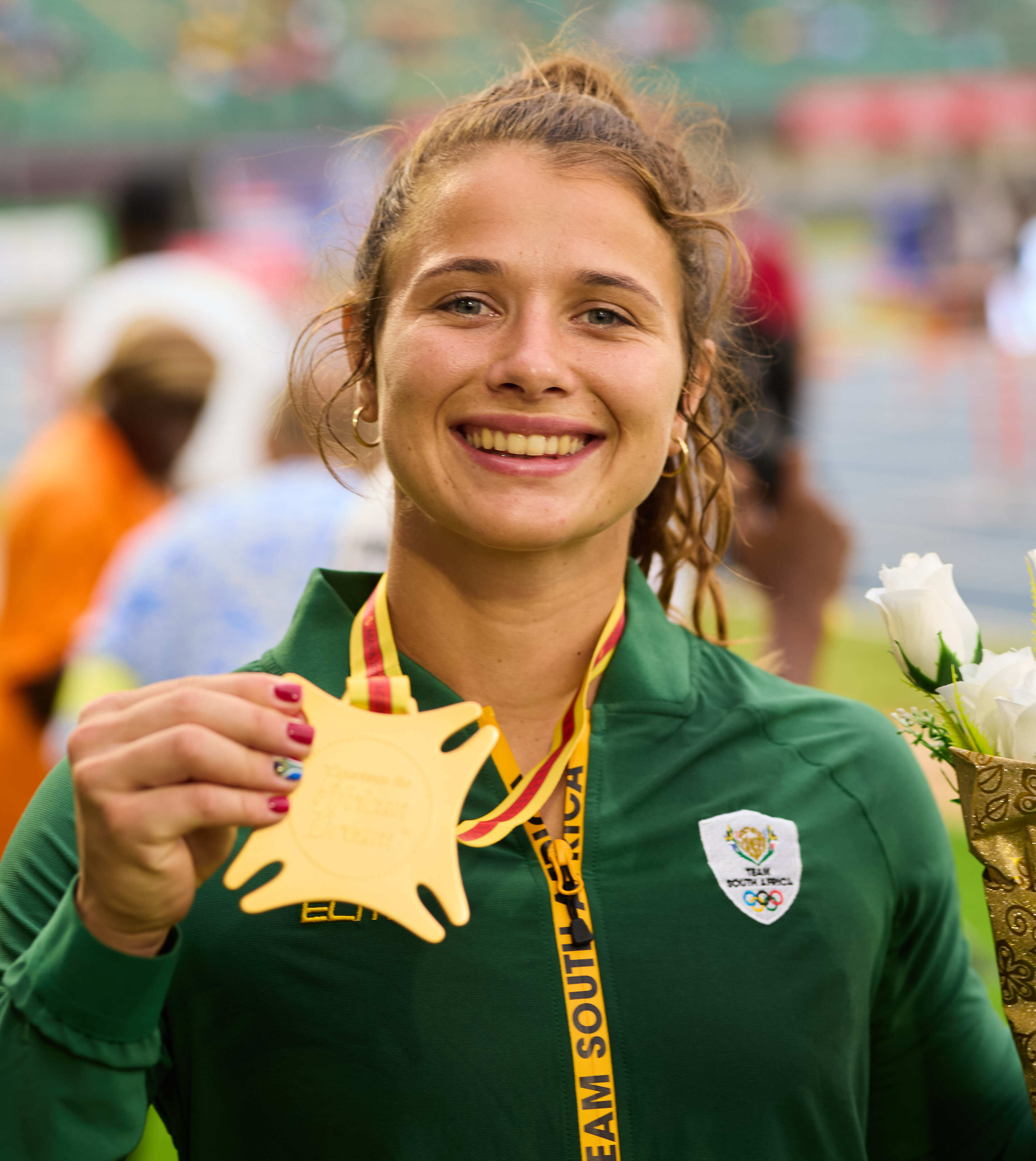
- Du Plessis at the 2023 African Games

Personal information
- Born: Jo-Ané van Dyk; 3 October 1997 (age 28) Worcester, Western Cape, South Africa
- Education: North-West University
- Height: 1.71 m (5 ft 7 in)
- Weight: 69 kg (152 lb)

Sport
- Sport: Athletics
- Event: Javelin throw

Achievements and titles
- Personal best: JT: 64.22 m (2024)
Medal record
Women's athletics
Representing South Africa
Olympic Games
Silver medal – second place	2024 Paris	Javelin throw
African Games
Gold medal – first place	2023 Accra	Javelin throw
Silver medal – second place	2019 Rabat	Javelin throw
Bronze medal – third place	2015 Brazzaville	Javelin throw
African Championships
Gold medal – first place	2022 Saint Pierre	Javelin throw
Gold medal – first place	2024 Douala	Javelin throw
Silver medal – second place	2016 Durban	Javelin throw
Silver medal – second place	2018 Asaba	Javelin throw
World U20 Championships
Silver medal – second place	2016 Bydgoszcz	Javelin throw
African Youth Games
Gold medal – first place	2014 Gaborone	Javelin throw
African Junior Championships
Gold medal – first place	2015 Addis Ababa	Javelin throw
- Updated on 10 August 2024

Jo-Ané du Plessis (née van Dyk; born 3 October 1997) is a South African track and field athlete who competes in the javelin throw. She is a two-time Olympian and won the silver medal in the women's javelin throw event at the 2024 Summer Olympics in Paris while also being a two-time African champion and multiple African Games medallist.

== Achievements ==
All information taken from World Athletics profile.

=== Competition record ===
Year	Competition	Venue	Position	Notes
Representing South Africa
2013	World Youth Championships	Addis Ababa, Ethiopia	6th	50.16 m
2014	African Youth Games	Gaborone, Botswana	1st	47.62 m
2014	Youth Olympic Games	Nanjing, China	7th	48.93 m
2015	African Junior Championships	Addis Ababa, Ethiopia	1st	49.47 m
2015	African Games	Brazzaville, Republic of the Congo	3rd	50.52 m
2016	African Championships	Durban, South Africa	2nd	56.22 m
2016	World U20 Championships	Bydgoszcz, Poland	2nd	57.32 m
2017	Universiade	Taipei, Taiwan	9th	57.02 m
2018	African Championships	Asaba, Nigeria	2nd	53.72 m
2019	Universiade	Naples, Italy	6th	56.85 m
2019	African Games	Rabat, Morocco	2nd	55.38 m
2021	Olympic Games	Tokyo, Japan	24th (q)	57.69 m
2022	African Championships	Port Louis, Mauritius	1st	60.65 m
2022	World Championships	Eugene, United States	15th (q)	57.79 m
2023	World Championships	Budapest, Hungary	10th	57.43 m
2024	African Games	Accra, Ghana	1st	60.80 m
2024	African Championships	Douala, Cameroon	1st	57.03 m
2024	Olympic Games	Paris, France	2nd	63.93 m
2025	World Championships	Tokyo, Japan	4th	63.06 m
2026	Commonwealth Games	Glasgow, United Kingdom	6th	56.22 m

=== National titles ===
- South African Championships
  - Javelin throw: 2018, 2021, 2022
- USSA Championships
  - Javelin throw: 2016, 2017, 2018, 2019, 2021, 2022
- South African U20 Championships
  - Javelin throw: 2016
- South African Junior Championships
  - Javelin throw: 2015
