= Selma Rosun =

Mauritian javelin thrower (born 1991)

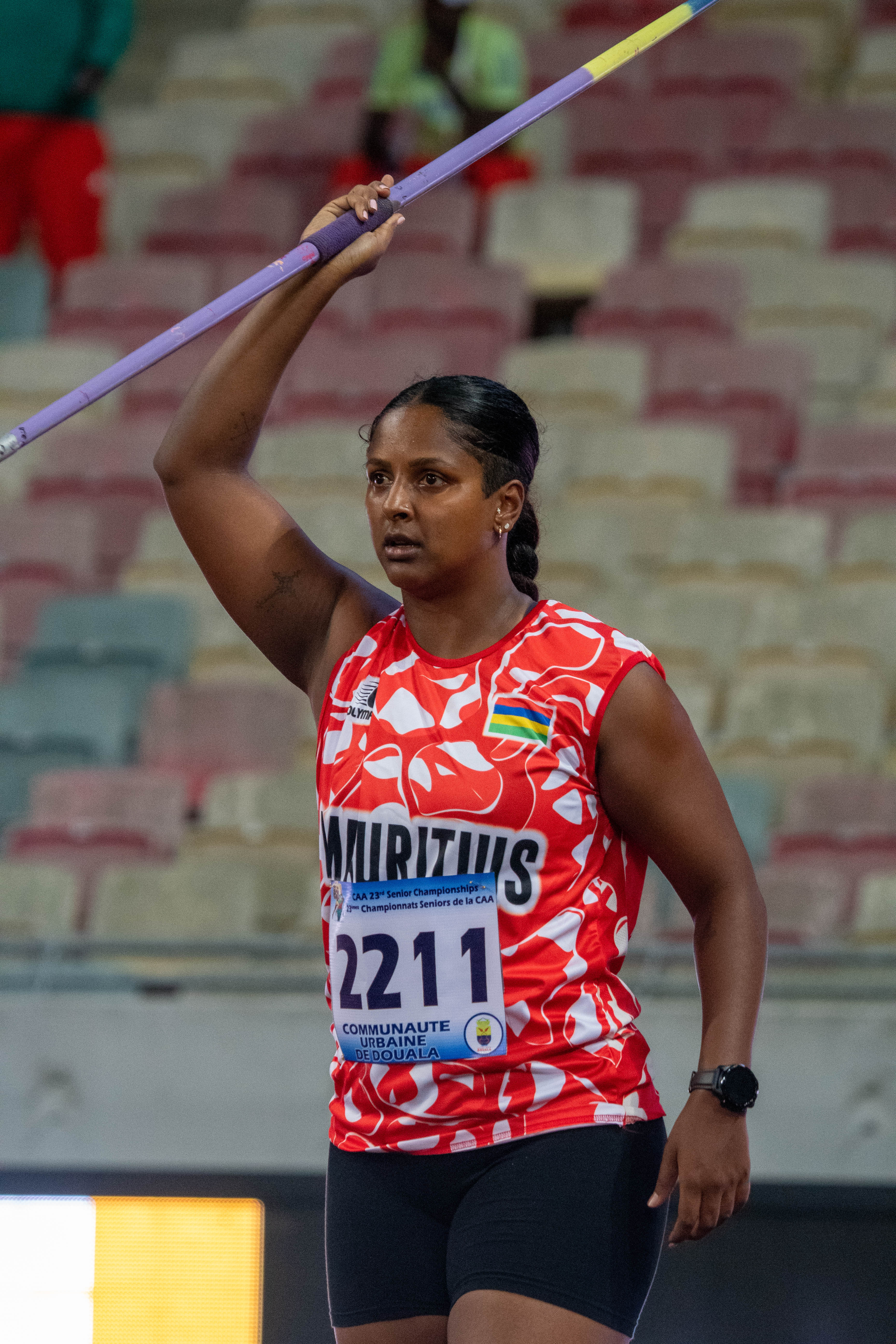

Personal information
- Full name: Selma Sharon Jessika Rosun
- Born: 26 April 1991 (age 35)

Sport
- Country: Mauritius
- Sport: Athletics
- Event: Javelin throw
Medal record
Women's athletics
Representing Mauritius
African Championships
Bronze medal – third place	2014 Marrakesh	Javelin throw

Selma Sharon Jessika Rosun (born 26 April 1991) is a Mauritian javelin thrower.

She won the bronze medal at the 2009 African Junior Championships, finished tenth at the 2010 African Championships, fifth at the 2011 All-Africa Games, sixth at the 2012 African Championships, won the bronze medal at the 2013 Jeux de la Francophonie, finished twelfth at the 2014 Commonwealth Games, won the bronze medal at the 2014 African Championships, finished sixth at the 2015 African Games, seventh at the 2016 African Championships, fourth at the 2017 Jeux de la Francophonie, seventh at the 2018 Commonwealth Games, fifth at the 2018 African Championships and fifth at the 2019 African Games.

Her personal best throw is 53.98 metres, achieved in May 2019 in Savona.
