= Zuta Mary Nartey =

Ghanaian javelin thrower

Personal information
- Nationality: Ghana
- Born: 14 November 1987 (age 38)

Sport
- Sport: Athletics
- Event: Javelin throw
Medal record
Women's athletics
Representing Ghana
African Games
Silver medal – second place	2015 Brazzaville	Javelin throw
African Championships
Silver medal – second place	2014 Marrakesh	Javelin throw
- Updated on 27 August 2016

Zuta Mary Nartey (or Mary Zutah Narteh; born 14 November 1987) is a Ghanaian javelin thrower.

== Javelin ==
In 2012, she placed fourth in the African Championships in Athletics in Porto-Novo with 49.69 meters.

In 2014, she placed eleventh at the Commonwealth Games in Glasgow, won silver at the African Championships in Athletics in Marrakesh with her personal best of 52.57 meters, and was eighth at the IAAF Continental Cup in Marrakesh.

She also won the silver medal in the Africa Games in Brazzaville in 2015.

She placed ninth in 2016 in the African Championships in Athletics in Durban with 45.40 meters.

In 2018, she got the silver medal in the Sekondi-Takoradi GAA(Ghana Athletics Association) Circuit with 45.35 meters.

== Shot put ==
In 2002, Nartey set a shot put record of 11.70 meters while in Osei Kyeretwie Senior High School during the Ashanti Regional Super Zonal athletics competition that lasted for 18 years until it was broken by Rashida Abass of Prempeh College in 2019.
