= Athletics at the 2010 Asian Games – Women's javelin throw =

Athletics event

Women's javelin throw at the 2010 Asian Games
- Venue: Aoti Main Stadium
- Date: 25 November 2010
- Competitors: 10 from 8 nations

Medalists
gold medal	Yuki Ebihara	Japan
silver medal	Xue Juan	China
bronze medal	Li Lingwei	China

The women's javelin throw event at the 2010 Asian Games was held at the Aoti Main Stadium, Guangzhou, China on 25 November 2010.

== Schedule ==
All times are China Standard Time (UTC+08:00)

Date	Time	Event
Thursday, 25 November 2010	18:20	Final

== Records ==
Prior to this competition, the existing world, Asian and Games records were as follows.

World Record	Barbora Špotáková (CZE)	72.28	Stuttgart, Germany	13 September 2008
Asian Record	Wei Jianhua (CHN)	63.92	Beijing, China	18 August 2000
Games Record	Buoban Pamang (THA)	61.31	Doha, Qatar	12 December 2006

== Results ==
Rank	Athlete	Attempt						Result	Notes
Rank	Athlete	1	2	3	4	5	6	Result	Notes
1st place, gold medalist(s)	Yuki Ebihara (JPN)	53.72	54.96	59.39	55.06	54.57	61.56	61.56	GR
2nd place, silver medalist(s)	Xue Juan (CHN)	X	X	58.19	56.16	58.72	57.62	58.72	
3rd place, bronze medalist(s)	Li Lingwei (CHN)	56.71	55.90	52.58	X	57.51	56.90	57.51	
4	Gim Gyeong-ae (KOR)	51.60	X	56.84	52.32	53.64	56.55	56.84	
5	Anastasiya Svechnikova (UZB)	54.94	52.43	X	55.96	X	53.03	55.96	
6	Seo Hae-an (KOR)	50.12	54.32	55.21	X	X	X	55.21	
7	Natta Nachan (THA)	50.88	X	X	48.89	45.65	50.11	50.88	
8	Nadeeka Lakmali (SRI)	48.94	X	50.68	48.76	42.27	47.88	50.68	
9	Rosie Villarito (PHI)	46.77	48.87	48.00				48.87	
10	Saraswathi Sundaram (IND)	46.75	47.43	X				47.43	
