= Athletics at the 2006 Asian Games – Women's javelin throw =

Women's javelin throw at the 2006 Asian Games
- Venue: Khalifa International Stadium
- Date: 9 December 2006
- Competitors: 7 from 5 nations

Medalists
gold medal	Buoban Pamang	Thailand
silver medal	Ma Ning	China
bronze medal	Yuki Ebihara	Japan

The women's javelin throw competition at the 2006 Asian Games in Doha, Qatar was held on 9 December 2006 at the Khalifa International Stadium.

== Schedule ==
All times are Arabia Standard Time (UTC+03:00)

Date	Time	Event
Saturday, 9 December 2006	18:05	Final

== Records ==
Prior to this competition, the existing world, Asian and Games records were as follows.

World Record	Osleidys Menéndez (CUB)	71.70	Helsinki, Finland	14 August 2005
Asian Record	Wei Jianhua (CHN)	63.92	Beijing, China	18 August 2000
Games Record	Lee Young-sun (KOR)	58.87	Busan, South Korea	7 October 2002

== Results ==
Rank	Athlete	Attempt						Result	Notes
Rank	Athlete	1	2	3	4	5	6	Result	Notes
1st place, gold medalist(s)	Buoban Pamang (THA)	55.77	59.67	61.31	55.76	—	—	61.31	GR
2nd place, silver medalist(s)	Ma Ning (CHN)	52.76	57.53	X	53.01	52.41	X	57.53	
3rd place, bronze medalist(s)	Yuki Ebihara (JPN)	50.81	56.27	52.62	54.83	56.88	57.47	57.47	
4	Kim Hyun-ju (KOR)	54.97	55.67	55.86	X	X	X	55.86	
5	Maheshi Silva (SRI)	53.98	55.62	53.37	50.40	50.61	52.94	55.62	
6	Xue Juan (CHN)	55.12	54.61	54.46	53.26	52.40	X	55.12	
7	Nadeeka Lakmali (SRI)	52.54	51.04	50.72	48.16	51.12	50.27	52.54	
