= 2013 Asian Athletics Championships – Women's javelin throw =

International sporting competition

The Women's Javelin throw at the 2013 Asian Athletics Championships was held at the Shree Shiv Chhatrapati Sports Complex on 6 July.

== Medalists ==
Gold	Li Lingwei; China
Silver	Nadeeka Lakmali; Sri Lanka
Bronze	Risa Miyashita; Japan

== Records ==
Standing records prior to the 2013 Asian Athletics Championships
World record	Barbora Špotáková (CZE)	72.28	Stuttgart, Germany	13 September 2008
Asian record	Lu Huihui (CHN)	65.62	Zhaoqing, China	27 June 2013
Championship record	Buoban Phamang (THA)	58.35	Amman, Jordan	2007

== Schedule ==
Date	Time	Round
6 July 2013	18:45	Final

== Results ==
The final was held at 16:45 local time.

Rank	Athlete	Nationality	#1	#2	#3	#4	#5	#6	Result	Notes
1st place, gold medalist(s)	Li Lingwei	China	x	59.66	57.71	60.65	59.87	59.06	60.65	CR
2nd place, silver medalist(s)	Nadeeka Lakmali	Sri Lanka	59.21	59.99	60.16	58.72	53.78	59.52	60.16	
3rd place, bronze medalist(s)	Risa Miyashita	Japan	x	49.47	52.05	53.86	55.30	53.15	55.30	
4	Seo Hae-An	South Korea	53.87	52.95	52.35	48.63	52.05	49.50	53.87	
5	Zhang Li	China	x	50.15	53.85	x	53.83	52.67	53.85	
6	Kiho Kuze	Japan	51.34	47.68	49.36	53.41	53.07	47.96	53.41	
7	Annu Rani	India	49.52	51.79	49.15	50.39	46.89	52.29	52.29	
8	Dilhani Lekamage	Sri Lanka	49.85	42.88	50.98	49.61	49.65	50.52	50.98	
9	Suman Devi	India	47.76	48.13	x				48.13	
10	Rosie Villarito	Philippines	42.82	46.29	43.14				46.29	
11	Mukesh Kumari	India	x	44.54	x				44.54	
