= Ratnapimpri =

Village in Maharashtra, India

Coordinates: 20°57′N 75°06′E

Ratnapimpri is a village in western Indian state of Maharashtra in the Jalgaon District, located on the bank of the River Gopi. It has been situated at the strategic location between two talukas - Parola and Amalner in Jalgaon district. Administratively, it is within Parola taluka but the assembly constituency is covered under Amalner. It is surrounded by the villages Bahadarpur, Bhokarbari, Sadavan, and Bhilali. The village consists of Sardar, Patil, Bhadane, Borse, Suryawanshi, Dhangar, Wankhede, and Bhil communities. Ratnapimpri sub-villages include Dabapimpri and Holpimpri. Although having three villages in one, the administrative activities are being handled by a single Gram-Panchayat, and postal services are centered in Holpimpri.

== Transportation and communication ==
Situated along State Highway 14, Ratnapimpri is connected to Amalner and Parola. It is 45 km away from the Jalgaon District, with almost all state transport buses that pass stopping in the village, though Minnidors and autos are available as alternatives. One can reach the village in an average time of 15 minutes from Parola and n 25 minutes from Amalner.

== Occupations and key activities ==
The dominant occupation in the village is farming. Cotton, wheat, groundnuts, jowar, bajra, dadar and vegetables are the main crops. Products are traded in markets such as Amalner, Parola, Dharangaon, and Jalgaon. Dairy farming and entrepreneurship are also well-represented vocations.

Although many people from the village are primarily engaged in agriculture profession, the younger generations typically serve in state and central government and defense forces. Engineers from Ratnapimpri are associated with organizations in diverse fields such as mechanical, chemical, IT/software, hospitality and management.

== Cultural activities ==
Jay Balaji Rath Yatra,. Mahashivratri, Shiv Jayanit, Ganesh Chaturthi, Navratri, Hanuman Jayanit, Ram Navami, Makar Sankranti, Gudhi Padwa, Dasra, Holi, and Diwali are the main festivals celebrated together in Ratnapimpri.

During the Makar Sankranti and Dasra celebrations, people hug each other and do Pranāma to elders, while distributing sweets (til gul) and gold (aptyachi pane). During Navratri, people leave their daily chores and engage in a nine-day celebration and worship of the Goddess Indasani.

== Languages ==
The Marathi language is the official state language, but Ahirani, which is the dialect of Marathi and Warhadi, is the de facto language.

== Education ==
The following schools are attended by local students:

- Primary school: Jivan Shikshan Vidya Mandir, Ratnapimpri.
- Primary school: Aadarsh prathmik vidya mandir, Dabapimpri.
- Higher secondary school and college: Yashavant Madhyamik vidyalaya, Ratnapimpri.
- Bahuddeshiya Aashram School, Ratnapimpri.
- Pratap College Amalner, Kisan College and R.L. College in Parola are the nearest science, arts and commerce colleges.
- Nath Nange baba Polytechnic and vasantrao more polytechnic are the nearest engineering colleges.

== Temples and key locations ==
- Shivdham - temple to Shiva
- Maruti Mandir
- Shri Datta Mandir
- Navnath Mandir
- Gayatri Mandir
- Mari Mata Mandir
- Tapovan – a temple, Homa Organic farm, and cow sanctuary established as an example of the Vedic lifestyle
