= 2025 Asian Athletics Championships – Women's javelin throw =

Women's javelin throw at the 2025 Asian Athletics Championships
- Venue: Gumi Civic Stadium
- Location: Gumi, South Korea
- Dates: 27 May
- Competitors: 15 from 11 nations
- Winning distance: 62.39 m

Medalists
gold medal	Su Lingdan	China
silver medal	Momone Ueda	Japan
bronze medal	Sae Takemoto	Japan

The women's javelin throw event at the 2025 Asian Athletics Championships was held on 27 May.

== Records ==
Records before the 2025 Asian Athletics Championships
Record	Athlete (nation)	Distance (m)	Location	Date
World record	Barbora Špotáková (CZE)	72.28	Stuttgart, Germany	13 September 2008
Asian record	Lü Huihui (CHN)	67.98	Shenyang, China	2 August 2019
Championship record	Lü Huihui (CHN)	65.83	Doha, Qatar	21 April 2019
World leading	Adriana Vilagoš (SRB)	67.22	Split, Croatia	26 April 2025
Asian leading	Yan Ziyi (CHN)	64.83	Chengdu, China	28 March 2025

== Schedule ==
The event schedule, in local time (UTC+9), was as follows:

Date	Time	Round
27 May	14:40	Final

== Results ==
Place	Athlete	Nation	#1	#2	#3	#4	#5	#6	Result	Notes
1st place, gold medalist(s)	Su Lingdan	China	55.25	60.84	58.72	63.29	—	—	63.29 m	PB
2nd place, silver medalist(s)	Momone Ueda	Japan	54.60	57.69	58.60	57.58	57.87	59.39	59.39 m	SB
3rd place, bronze medalist(s)	Sae Takemoto	Japan	56.60	x	x	58.94	56.15	56.93	58.94 m	
4	Annu Rani	India	56.92	x	58.30	58.11	57.80	x	58.30 m	
5	Dai Qianqian	China	x	53.17	57.99	56.51	55.95	x	57.99 m	
6	Dilhani Lekamge	Sri Lanka	54.35	55.53	55.15	x	x	55.21	55.53 m	
7	Chu Pin-hsun	Chinese Taipei	x	52.66	54.60	52.09	54.17	51.41	54.60 m	
8	Nargiza Kuchkarova	Uzbekistan	52.72	52.39	50.34	53.29	51.38	51.66	53.29 m	
9	Li Hui-jun	Chinese Taipei	49.03	51.66	x				51.66 m	
10	Jariya Wichaidit	Thailand	50.75	x	51.60				51.60 m	
11	Gim Gyeong-ae	South Korea	48.94	x	47.32				48.94 m	
12	Park Ah-young	South Korea	47.68	46.68	48.25				48.25 m	
13	Ng Jing Xuan	Malaysia	40.81	44.63	41.41				44.63 m	
14	Chandra Kala Lamgade	Nepal	38.25	36.90	40.57				40.57 m	
15	Salsabeel Al-Sayyar	Kuwait	33.98	34.73	36.35				36.35 m	SB
