= 2023 Asian Athletics Championships – Women's javelin throw =

Women's javelin throw at the 2023 Asian Athletics Championships
- Venue: National Stadium
- Location: Bangkok, Thailand
- Dates: 12 July
- Competitors: 13 from 10 nations
- Winning distance: 61.67 m

Medalists
gold medal	Marina Saito	Japan
silver medal	Liu Shiying	China
bronze medal	Dilhani Lekamge	Sri Lanka

The women's javelin throw event at the 2023 Asian Athletics Championships was held on 12 July.

== Records ==
Records before the 2023 Asian Athletics Championships
Record	Athlete (nation)	Distance (m)	Location	Date
World record	Barbora Špotáková (CZE)	72.28	Stuttgart, Germany	13 September 2008
Asian record	Lü Huihui (CHN)	67.98	Shenyang, China	2 August 2019
Championship record	Lü Huihui (CHN)	65.83	Doha, Qatar	21 April 2019
World leading	Sigrid Borge (NOR)	80.17	Halle, Germany	20 May 2023
Asian leading	Haruka Kitaguchi (JPN)	65.09	Paris, France	9 June 2023

== Results ==
Rank	Name	Nationality	#1	#2	#3	#4	#5	#6	Result	Notes
1st place, gold medalist(s)	Marina Saito	Japan	56.05	61.67	58.95	59.52	59.58	61.15	61.67	
2nd place, silver medalist(s)	Liu Shiying	China	61.51	59.17	60.67	x	x	61.09	61.51	
3rd place, bronze medalist(s)	Dilhani Lekamge	Sri Lanka	52.79	59.13	57.15	59.32	60.93	59.39	60.93	NR
4	Annu Rani	India	55.31	58.70	59.10	x	58.46	58.29	59.10	
5	Gu Xinjie	China	57.54	55.52	x	54.58	x	54.86	57.54	
6	Momone Ueda	Japan	52.65	55.31	57.25	54.02	54.40	53.96	57.25	
7	Su Chao-chi	Chinese Taipei	51.65	x	51.91	51.22	49.67	52.74	52.74	
8	Jannet Mukhamova	Turkmenistan	51.68	50.20	50.74	46.83	x	52.16	52.16	NR
9	Jariya Wichaidet	Thailand	x	50.23	51.14				51.14	
10	Chiu Pin-hsun	Chinese Taipei	45.19	50.87	48.47				50.87	
11	Gim Gyeong-ae	South Korea	47.15	49.04	49.13				49.13	
12	Ng Ki Sum	Hong Kong	43.87	42.71	45.14				45.14	
13	Gennah Malapit	Philippines	43.57	x	x				43.57	
