= 2015 Asian Athletics Championships – Women's javelin throw =

The women's javelin throw event at the 2015 Asian Athletics Championships was held on June 7.

== Results ==
Rank	Name	Nationality	#1	#2	#3	#4	#5	#6	Result	Notes
1st place, gold medalist(s)	Liu Shiying	China	54.63	59.60	59.15	x	61.33	59.85	61.33	CR
2nd place, silver medalist(s)	Yang Xinli	China	59.24	x	x	x	54.73	x	59.24	
3rd place, bronze medalist(s)	Risa Miyashita	Japan	51.19	49.87	52.22	49.71	48.90	54.76	54.76	
4	Nadeeka Lakmali	Sri Lanka	51.53	49.82	52.29	44.74	51.40	46.51	52.29	
5	Annu Rani	India	46.03	48.16	48.41	46.20	51.26	50.02	51.26	
6	Anastasiya Svechnikova	Uzbekistan	46.52	47.05	45.37	44.28	49.18	50.92	50.92	
7	Kim Gyeon-gae	South Korea	48.74	x	47.06	x	46.44	x	48.74	
8	Chang Chu	Chinese Taipei	48.02	x	47.92	45.99	x	46.53	48.02	
9	Suman Devi	India	39.16	46.55	42.98				46.55	
10	Ai Yamauchi	Japan	42.60	45.00	43.91				45.00	
11	Woo Wing Tung	Hong Kong	41.50	40.28	37.82				41.50	
12	Sima Kumari Tharu	Nepal	36.17	34.16	34.62				36.17	
