= 2009 Asian Athletics Championships – Women's javelin throw =

The women's javelin throw event at the 2009 Asian Athletics Championships was held at the Guangdong Olympic Stadium on November 12.

== Results ==
Rank	Athlete	Nationality	#1	#2	#3	#4	#5	#6	Result	Notes
1st place, gold medalist(s)	Liu Chunhua	China	52.81	54.88	57.93	57.73	x	54.35	57.93	
2nd place, silver medalist(s)	Li Lingwei	China	52.71	55.13	53.79	54.84	51.31	x	55.13	
3rd place, bronze medalist(s)	Kim Kyong-ae	South Korea	50.07	51.31	52.78	51.00	50.78	53.84	53.84	
4	Yuki Ebihara	Japan	47.03	51.75	51.14	49.72	51.31	53.18	53.18	
5	Liliya Dusmetova	Uzbekistan	50.07	51.37	48.23	49.10	49.01	52.25	52.25	
6	Saraswathi Sundaram	India	42.39	43.06	41.70	47.37	51.15	46.46	51.15	
7	Rosie Villarito	Philippines	47.78	46.79	46.21	46.22	46.31	45.39	47.78	
