= 2005 Asian Athletics Championships – Women's javelin throw =

The women's javelin throw event at the 2005 Asian Athletics Championships was held in Incheon, South Korea on September 4.

== Results ==
Rank	Name	Nationality	Result	Notes
1st place, gold medalist(s)	Park Ho-Hyun	South Korea	55.58	PB
2nd place, silver medalist(s)	Lee Young-Sun	South Korea	55.29	
3rd place, bronze medalist(s)	Anne De Silva	Sri Lanka	54.86	
4	Liliya Dusmetova	Uzbekistan	54.52	SB
5	Zhang Li	China	54.11	
6	Harumi Yamamoto	Japan	52.60	
7	Suman Devi	India	52.58	
8	Emika Yoshida	Japan	51.62	
9	Nadeeka Lakmali	Sri Lanka	48.54	
10	Jang Ok-Ju	North Korea	41.68	PB
11	Parveen Akhtar	Pakistan	37.51	
