= 2011 Asian Athletics Championships – Women's javelin throw =

The Women's Javelin throw at the 2011 Asian Athletics Championships was held at the Kobe Universiade Memorial Stadium on 7 July.

== Medalists ==
Gold	Liu Chunhua; China
Silver	Wang Ping; China
Bronze	Yuka Sato; Japan

== Records ==
Standing records prior to the 2010 European Athletics Championships
World record	Barbora Špotáková (CZE)	72.28	Stuttgart, Germany	13 September 2008
Asian record	Wei Jianhua (CHN)	63.92	Beijing, China	18 August 2000
Championship record	Buoban Phamang (THA)	58.35	Amman, Jordan	2007
World Leading	Maria Abakumova (GER)	67.98	Velenje, Slovenia	28 June 2011
Asian Leading	Liu Chunhu (CHN)	60.65	Zhaoqing, China	23 April 2011

== Schedule ==
Date	Time	Round
7 July 2011	16:45	Final

== Results ==
=== Final ===
The final was held at 16:45 local time.

Rank	Athlete	Nationality	#1	#2	#3	#4	#5	#6	Result	Notes
1st place, gold medalist(s)	Liu Chunhua	China	53.44	54.39	58.05	x	51.82	53.38	58.05	
2nd place, silver medalist(s)	Wang Ping	China	50.61	55.80	48.59	54.17	51.84	52.77	55.80	
3rd place, bronze medalist(s)	Yuka Sato	Japan	53.19	49.70	49.28	x	54.16	53.33	54.16	
4	Risa Miyashita	Japan	44.51	50.04	51.64	52.36	52.37	51.95	52.37	
5	Nadeeka Lakmali	Sri Lanka	51.94	51.44	50.89	49.92	50.55	48.60	51.94	
6	Gim Gyeong Ae	South Korea	47.24	45.99	49.96				49.96	
7	Rosie Villarito	Philippines	x	49.30	44.98	46.81	48.82	47.11	49.30	
8	Haruka Matoba	Japan	46.56	45.36	44.46	48.17	46.22	48.67	48.67	
9	Anastasiya Svechnikova	Uzbekistan	x	45.26	45.11				45.26	
