= Athletics at the 2022 Asian Games – Women's javelin throw =

Women's javelin throw at the 2022 Asian Games
- Venue: Hangzhou Olympic Expo Main Stadium
- Date: 3 October 2023
- Competitors: 11 from 8 nations

Medalists
gold medal	Annu Rani	India
silver medal	Dilhani Lekamge	Sri Lanka
bronze medal	Lü Huihui	China

The women's javelin throw competition at the 2022 Asian Games took place on 3 October 2023 at the HOC Stadium, Hangzhou.

== Schedule ==
All times are China Standard Time (UTC+08:00)

Date	Time	Event
Tuesday, 3 October 2023	20:10	Final

== Records ==
Prior to this competition, the existing world, Asian and Games records were as follows.

World Record	Barbora Špotáková (CZE)	72.28	Stuttgart, Germany	13 September 2008
Asian Record	Lü Huihui (CHN)	67.98	Shenyang, China	2 August 2019
Games Record	Liu Shiying (CHN)	66.09	Jakarta, Indonesia	28 August 2018

== Results ==
Legend

- r — Retired

Rank	Athlete	Attempt						Result	Notes
Rank	Athlete	1	2	3	4	5	6	Result	Notes
1st place, gold medalist(s)	Annu Rani (IND)	56.99	61.28	59.24	62.92	57.66	X	62.92	
2nd place, silver medalist(s)	Dilhani Lekamge (SRI)	59.12	54.10	60.70	61.57	X	60.74	61.57	
3rd place, bronze medalist(s)	Lü Huihui (CHN)	57.58	59.95	58.60	56.00	61.29	58.72	61.29	
4	Marina Saito (JPN)	61.10	X	X	57.62	X	60.74	61.10	
5	Liu Shiying (CHN)	56.06	57.62	X	X	56.89	r	57.62	
6	Sae Takemoto (JPN)	52.35	52.20	55.14	55.39	53.31	55.22	55.39	
7	Chu Pin-hsun (TPE)	54.93	51.71	51.43	48.75	51.34	54.30	54.93	
8	Jariya Wichaidit (THA)	49.21	X	53.78	50.31	X	X	53.78	
9	Li Hui-jun (TPE)	X	51.54	47.86				51.54	
10	Gim Gyeong-ae (KOR)	47.47	48.61	49.28				49.28	
11	Jennet Muhamowa (TKM)	47.66	47.73	44.65				47.73	
