= 2002 Asian Athletics Championships – Women's javelin throw =

The women's javelin throw event at the 2002 Asian Athletics Championships was held in Colombo, Sri Lanka on 11 August.

== Results ==
Rank	Name	Nationality	Result	Notes
1st place, gold medalist(s)	Ma Ning	China	57.15	
2nd place, silver medalist(s)	Xue Juan	China	56.04	
3rd place, bronze medalist(s)	Lee Young-Sun	South Korea	53.72	
4	Anne Maheshi De Silva	Sri Lanka	52.73	
5	Harumi Yamamoto	Japan	48.73	
6	Gerlayn Amandoron	Philippines	46.88	SB
7	Nadeeka Lakmali	Sri Lanka	46.21	
8	C.R.N. Fernando	Sri Lanka	42.81	PB
