= Athletics at the 2013 SEA Games – Women's javelin throw =

The women's javelin throw at the 2013 SEA Games, the athletics was held in Naypyidaw, Myanmar. The track and field events took place at the Wunna Theikdi Stadiumon December 18.

== Schedule ==
All times are Myanmar Standard Time (UTC+06:30)

Date	Time	Event
Wednesday, 18 December 2013	16:00	Final

== Records ==
Prior to this competition, the existing world, Asian, and Southeast Asian Games records were as follows.

World Record	Barbora Špotáková (CZE)	72.28m	Stuttgart, Germany	13 September 2008
Asian Record	Lü Huihui (CHN)	65.62m	Zhaoqing, China	27 April 2013
Games Record	Buoban Pamang (THA)	55.97m	Nakhon Ratchasima, Thailand	7 December 2007

== Results ==
Legend

- X — Failure
- NM — No Mark

Rank	Athlete	Attempts						Result	Notes
Rank	Athlete	1	2	3	4	5	6	Result	Notes
1st place, gold medalist(s)	Saowalak Pettong (THA)	?	?	?	?	?	?	52.96	
2nd place, silver medalist(s)	Natta Nachan (THA)	?	?	?	?	?	?	50.37	
3rd place, bronze medalist(s)	Bui Thi Xuan (VIE)	?	?	?	?	?	?	48.31	
4	Rosie Villarito (PHI)	?	?	?	?	?	?	48.00	
5	Soe Soe Htwe (MYA)	?	?	?	?	?	?	44.42	NR
6	Math Thinmanao (LAO)	?	?	?	?	?	?	43.89	
7	May Thayaphi Soe (MYA)	?	?	?	?	?	?	35.64	
