= Park Ho-hyun =

South Korean javelin thrower (born 1978)

Medal record

Women's athletics

Representing South Korea

Asian Championships
Gold medal – first place	2005 Incheon	Javelin throw

Park Ho-hyun (born 21 March 1978) is a South Korean female javelin thrower. She achieved her personal best of 55.58 m (182 ft 4 in) at the 2005 Asian Athletics Championships in Incheon, South Korea. This made her the Asian champion that year ahead of her compatriot Lee Young-sun. She was the sole gold medallist for the host nation at the event. In her younger years she won medals at the Asian Junior Athletics Championships in 1996 and 1997.

== International competitions ==
Year	Competition	Venue	Position	Event	Notes
1996	Asian Junior Championships	New Delhi, India	3rd	Javelin throw	48.68 m
1996	World Junior Championships	Sydney, Australia	11th (q)	Javelin throw	44.42 m
1997	Asian Junior Championships	Bangkok, Thailand	2nd	Javelin throw	54.48 m
2005	Asian Championships	Incheon, South Korea	1st	Javelin throw	55.58 m
