= Athletics at the 1995 Summer Universiade – Women's javelin throw =

The women's javelin throw event at the 1995 Summer Universiade was held on 3 August at the Hakatanomori Athletic Stadium in Fukuoka, Japan.

== Results ==
Rank	Athlete	Nationality	#1	#2	#3	#4	#5	#6	Result	Notes
1st place, gold medalist(s)	Felicia Țilea	Romania	x	x	56.72	52.82	60.82	62.16	62.16	
2nd place, silver medalist(s)	Claudia Isăilă	Romania	58.70	x	x	58.30	58.68	61.74	61.74	
3rd place, bronze medalist(s)	Lee Young-sun	South Korea	48.78	55.88	59.40	58.30	53.84	61.62	61.62	
4	Liu Cui	China	56.64	59.70	59.80	56.30	55.56	58.70	59.80	
5	Mikaela Ingberg	Finland	57.62	x	56.92	59.32	58.18	x	59.32	
6	Li Lei	China	55.16	x	55.98	52.46	58.48	58.66	58.66	
7	Martine Bègue	France	x	x	55.06	58.24	x	x	58.24	
8	Takako Miyake	Japan	52.18	55.86	53.64	52.58	x	53.58	55.86	
9	Jenny McCormick	United States	49.88	53.24	50.16				53.24	
10	Heather Berlin	United States	49.06	49.00	52.54				52.54	
11	Lisa Casimir	Dominica	45.84	45.72	46.70				46.70	
12	Billor Dulkadir	Turkey	x	44.54	x				44.54	
13	Johanna Nuembo	Namibia	x	39.86	41.18				41.18	
	Yuko Kojima	Japan	x	x	x				NM	
	Rita Ramanauskaitė	Lithuania							DNS	
