= Athletics at the 2002 Asian Games – Women's javelin throw =

Women's javelin throw at the 2002 Asian Games
- Venue: Busan Asiad Main Stadium
- Date: 7 October 2002
- Competitors: 7 from 5 nations

Medalists
gold medal	Lee Young-sun	South Korea
silver medal	Liang Lili	China
bronze medal	Ha Xiaoyan	China

The women's javelin throw competition at the 2002 Asian Games in Busan, South Korea was held on 7 October at the Busan Asiad Main Stadium.

== Schedule ==
All times are Korea Standard Time (UTC+09:00)

Date	Time	Event
Monday, 7 October 2002	15:00	Final

== Records ==
Prior to this competition, the existing world, Asian and Games records were as follows.

World Record	Osleidys Menéndez (CUB)	71.54	Rethymno, Greece	1 July 2007
Asian Record	Wei Jianhua (CHN)	63.92	Beijing, China	18 August 2000
Games Record	—	—	—	—

== Results ==
Rank	Athlete	Attempt						Result	Notes
Rank	Athlete	1	2	3	4	5	6	Result	Notes
1st place, gold medalist(s)	Lee Young-sun (KOR)	58.87	55.78	55.94	54.68	X	56.59	58.87	GR
2nd place, silver medalist(s)	Liang Lili (CHN)	58.30	57.20	58.77	56.21	55.64	57.71	58.77	
3rd place, bronze medalist(s)	Ha Xiaoyan (CHN)	58.29	57.97	57.66	X	55.82	57.24	58.29	
4	Gurmeet Kaur (IND)	51.91	54.78	50.66	X	53.73	50.21	54.78	
5	Chang Jung-yeon (KOR)	49.04	52.34	49.24	54.08	54.66	53.45	54.66	
6	Maheshi Silva (SRI)	53.33	51.42	54.56	48.18	45.10	48.06	54.56	
7	Takako Miyake (JPN)	50.87	50.09	53.47	53.72	51.79	50.67	53.72	
