= 2007 Asian Athletics Championships – Women's javelin throw =

The women's javelin throw event at the 2007 Asian Athletics Championships was held in Amman, Jordan on July 26.

== Results ==
Rank	Name	Nationality	Result	Notes
1st place, gold medalist(s)	Buoban Pamang	Thailand	58.35	
2nd place, silver medalist(s)	Gim Gyeong-ae	South Korea	53.01	
3rd place, bronze medalist(s)	Nadeeka Lakmali	Sri Lanka	52.59	
4	Liliya Dusmetova	Uzbekistan	51.34	
5	Emika Yoshida	Japan	49.98	
6	Chen Yu-Hsun	Chinese Taipei	46.96	
7	Chiu Pei-Lien	Chinese Taipei	45.81	
