= 2004 World Junior Championships in Athletics – Women's javelin throw =

Athletic competition

The women's javelin throw event at the 2004 World Junior Championships in Athletics was held in Grosseto, Italy, at Stadio Olimpico Carlo Zecchini on 13 and 15 July.

== Medalists ==
Gold	Vivian Zimmer; Germany
Silver	Annika Suthe; Germany
Bronze	Annabel Thomson; Australia

== Results ==
=== Final ===
15 July

Rank	Name	Nationality	Attempts						Result	Notes
Rank	Name	Nationality	1	2	3	4	5	6	Result	Notes
1st place, gold medalist(s)	Vivian Zimmer	Germany	58.24	58.50	54.70	58.21	54.78	58.19	58.50	
2nd place, silver medalist(s)	Annika Suthe	Germany	57.13	x	52.08	54.38	54.81	57.15	57.15	
3rd place, bronze medalist(s)	Annabel Thomson	Australia	53.26	52.38	51.04	54.06	53.64	56.01	56.01	
4	Doriane Gilibert	France	51.44	52.78	51.02	50.69	52.89	54.77	54.77	
5	Yuki Ebihara	Japan	54.44	52.60	51.93	51.84	50.06	53.77	54.44	
6	Ásdís Hjálmsdóttir	Iceland	43.77	49.64	54.05	49.93	x	x	54.05	
7	Elfje Willemsen	Belgium	52.70	48.63	49.06	49.61	48.26	49.99	52.70	
8	Sofie Schoenmaekers	Belgium	52.59	52.67	51.46	48.87	51.13	51.30	52.67	
9	Emika Yoshida	Japan	52.25	50.56	49.44				52.25	
10	Hanna Lindgren	Finland	x	49.03	51.66				51.66	
11	Jin Ting	China	51.16	x	47.07				51.16	
12	Yekaterina Kozhenkova	Russia	50.24	x	51.01				51.01	

=== Qualifications ===
13 July

==== Group A ====
Rank	Name	Nationality	Attempts			Result	Notes
Rank	Name	Nationality	1	2	3	Result	Notes
1	Ásdís Hjálmsdóttir	Iceland	49.51	49.00	55.51	55.51	Q
2	Annabel Thomson	Australia	54.54	-	-	54.54	Q
3	Vivian Zimmer	Germany	53.45	-	-	53.45	Q
4	Yekaterina Kozhenkova	Russia	53.13	-	-	53.13	Q
5	Emika Yoshida	Japan	51.52	48.44	52.32	52.32	Q
6	Elfje Willemsen	Belgium	46.39	51.95	47.46	51.95	q
7	Margaryta Dorozhon	Ukraine	49.23	45.32	x	49.23	
8	Romina Ugatai	France	x	49.12	45.50	49.12	
9	Maria Negoita	Romania	48.77	48.19	46.87	48.77	
10	Varvára Zóhou	Greece	42.17	48.73	48.52	48.73	
11	Olga Gamza	Belarus	40.25	47.56	40.35	47.56	
12	Madara Dzalbe	Latvia	47.36	x	45.14	47.36	
13	Bregje Crolla	Netherlands	43.93	x	43.15	43.93	
14	Ruzica Kozjak	Croatia	41.83	x	x	41.83	

==== Group B ====
Rank	Name	Nationality	Attempts			Result	Notes
Rank	Name	Nationality	1	2	3	Result	Notes
1	Annika Suthe	Germany	52.23	54.13	-	54.13	Q
2	Hanna Lindgren	Finland	x	52.30	-	52.30	Q
3	Doriane Gilibert	France	50.45	51.92	52.11	52.11	q
4	Sofie Schoenmaekers	Belgium	50.71	48.53	51.65	51.65	q
5	Yuki Ebihara	Japan	50.63	x	51.12	51.12	q
6	Jin Ting	China	49.89	49.46	49.78	49.89	q
7	Zoe Pelbart	Australia	49.51	38.01	x	49.51	
8	Maryna Buksa	Belarus	48.38	47.62	48.85	48.85	
9	Sin Bo-Ra	South Korea	x	47.91	x	47.91	
10	Berna Demirci	Turkey	39.08	47.81	47.04	47.81	
11	Rebecca Bartlett	United Kingdom	46.05	46.15	46.88	46.88	
12	Silvia Carli	Italy	43.94	43.89	44.65	44.65	
13	Mariya Abakumova	Russia	x	43.95	41.49	43.95	
14	Mallory Webb	United States	x	42.27	42.89	42.89	
15	Coralys Ortíz	Puerto Rico	42.71	42.66	42.38	42.71	

== Participation ==
According to an unofficial count, 29 athletes from 22 countries participated in the event.

- Australia (2)
- Belarus (2)
- Belgium (2)
- China (1)
- Croatia (1)
- Finland (1)
- France (2)
- Germany (2)
- Greece (1)
- Iceland (1)
- Italy (1)
- Japan (2)
- Latvia (1)
- Netherlands (1)
- Puerto Rico (1)
- Romania (1)
- Russia (2)
- South Korea (1)
- Turkey (1)
- Ukraine (1)
- United Kingdom (1)
- United States (1)
