= Chang Jung-yeon =

South Korean javelin thrower (born 1977)

- Hangul: 장정연
- RR: Jang Jeongyeon
- MR: Chang Chŏngyŏn

Chang Jung-yeon
Medal record

Women's athletics

Representing South Korea

Asian Championships
Silver medal – second place	2003 Manila	Javelin throw

Chang Jung-yeon (born 6 April 1977) is a female javelin thrower from South Korea. Her personal best throw is 60.92 metres (199.9 ft), achieved in April 2004 in Jeonju.

== Achievements ==
Year	Competition	Venue	Position	Notes
Representing South Korea
2002	Asian Games	Busan, South Korea	5th	54.66 m (179.3 ft)
2003	Asian Championships	Manila, Philippines	2nd	53.23 m (174.6 ft)
2003	Afro-Asian Games	Hyderabad, India	7th	51.19 m (167.9 ft)
2004	Olympic Games	Athens, Greece	36th (q)	53.93 m (176.9 ft)
