= Athletics at the 2018 Asian Games – Women's javelin throw =

Asian Games athletics competition

Women's javelin throw at the 2018 Asian Games
- Venue: Gelora Bung Karno Stadium
- Date: 28 August 2018
- Competitors: 10 from 7 nations

Medalists
gold medal	Liu Shiying	China
silver medal	Lü Huihui	China
bronze medal	Gim Gyeong-ae	South Korea

The women's javelin throw competition at the 2018 Asian Games took place on 28 August 2018 at the Gelora Bung Karno Stadium.

== Schedule ==
All times are Western Indonesia Time (UTC+07:00)

Date	Time	Event
Tuesday, 28 August 2018	19:25	Final

== Records ==
Prior to this competition, the existing world, Asian and Games records were as follows.

World Record	Barbora Špotáková (CZE)	72.28	Stuttgart, Germany	13 September 2008
Asian Record	Lü Huihui (CHN)	67.69	Halle, Germany	26 May 2018
Games Record	Zhang Li (CHN)	65.47	Incheon, South Korea	1 October 2014

== Results ==
Rank	Athlete	Attempt						Result	Notes
Rank	Athlete	1	2	3	4	5	6	Result	Notes
1st place, gold medalist(s)	Liu Shiying (CHN)	66.09	65.15	65.39	64.23	64.13	—	66.09	GR
2nd place, silver medalist(s)	Lü Huihui (CHN)	62.57	59.25	60.62	60.72	X	63.16	63.16	
3rd place, bronze medalist(s)	Gim Gyeong-ae (KOR)	54.09	56.00	53.85	54.98	52.79	56.74	56.74	
4	Marina Saito (JPN)	55.64	53.84	56.03	48.92	53.77	56.46	56.46	
5	Li Hui-jun (TPE)	52.82	53.21	48.76	53.80	54.83	X	54.83	
6	Annu Rani (IND)	51.30	50.34	53.93	X	X	X	53.93	
7	Natta Nachan (THA)	49.77	50.78	52.41	X	53.32	X	53.32	
8	Jariya Wichaidit (THA)	49.02	X	51.90	X	52.36	49.61	52.36	
9	Risa Miyashita (JPN)	50.91	51.05	51.00				51.05	
10	Siti Nazirah Napisatul (INA)	X	X	37.86				37.86	
