= 2019 Asian Athletics Championships – Women's javelin throw =

Women's javelin throw at the 2019 Asian Athletics Championships
- Venue: Khalifa International Stadium
- Location: Doha, Qatar
- Dates: 21 April
- Competitors: 9 from 7 nations
- Winning distance: 65.83 m CR

Medalists
gold medal	Lü Huihui	China
silver medal	Annu Rani	India
bronze medal	Natta Nachan	Thailand

The women's javelin throw at the 2019 Asian Athletics Championships was held on 21 April.

== Records ==
Records before the 2019 Asian Athletics Championships
Record	Athlete (nation)	Distance (m)	Location	Date
World record	Barbora Špotáková (CZE)	72.28	Stuttgart, Germany	13 September 2008
Asian record	Lü Huihui (CHN)	67.72	Huangshi, China	13 April 2019
Championship record	Li Lingwei (CHN)	63.06	Bhubaneswar, India	6 July 2017
World leading	Lü Huihui (CHN)	67.72	Huangshi, China	13 April 2019
Asian leading	Lü Huihui (CHN)	67.72	Huangshi, China	13 April 2019

== Results ==
Rank	Name	Nationality	#1	#2	#3	#4	#5	#6	Result	Notes
1st place, gold medalist(s)	Lü Huihui	China	64.92	65.83	62.37	59.39	60.70	62.27	65.83	CR
2nd place, silver medalist(s)	Annu Rani	India	60.22	58.86	53.91	56.56	x	50.41	60.22	
3rd place, bronze medalist(s)	Natta Nachan	Thailand	49.75	51.41	54.27	56.01	54.38	54.16	56.01	PB
4	Risa Miyashita	Japan	51.53	55.27	48.78	53.21	54.41	52.66	55.27	
5	Sanobar Erkinova	Uzbekistan	46.63	54.75	50.61	52.37	53.80	49.80	54.75	
6	Gim Gyeong-ae	South Korea	54.73	54.12	53.49	52.93	54.63	54.55	54.73	
7	Kumari Sharmila	India	48.54	54.48	53.05	x	53.63	53.85	54.48	
8	Li Hui-jun	Chinese Taipei	44.91	52.93	49.47	50.34	x	48.53	52.93	
9	Marina Saito	Japan	47.16	51.23	52.40				52.40	
	Sara Al-Mannai	Qatar							DNS	
	Liu Shiying	China							DNS	
