= Xue Juan =

Xue Juan may refer to:

- Xue Juan (javelin thrower) (born 1986), Chinese javelin thrower
- Xue Juan (table tennis) (born 1989), Chinese para table tennis player
