= Liu Chunhua =

Chinese javelin thrower (born 1986)

Medal record

Women's athletics

Representing China

Asian Championships
Gold medal – first place	2009 Guangzhou	Javelin throw
Gold medal – first place	2011 Kobe	Javelin throw

Liu Chunhua (born 1 October 1986) is a Chinese javelin thrower. She is a two-time Asian Champion in the event and won gold medals at the National Games of China and East Asian Games in 2009. Her personal best is a throw of 60.65 metres.

== Career ==
Liu began competing in the event as a teenager and in 2003 she threw a best of 58.03 metres. Representing Hunan Province, she was seventh at the 2005 National Games of China. Liu came sixth at the Chinese World Trials in 2007. Although the following year's Chinese championships were held after the 2008 Beijing Olympics, she established herself at a national level by taking the Chinese javelin title in a personal best 59.04 m, finally improving upon her best mark she had set as a sixteen-year-old.

Liu missed the 2009 World Championships in Athletics, but she had a rapid ascent at the regional level that year. She won the national title for a second time and improved her best to 59.55 m on the Chinese Grand Prix circuit. In October she won the javelin at the 2009 National Games of China with another best of 60.65 m. The 2009 Asian Athletics Championships held the next month in Guangzhou brought her another gold medal as she and Li Lingwei took the top two spots for the host nation. Liu threw beyond the 60-metre mark again at December's 2009 East Asian Games to win her third gold on home soil in 2009, while it was Zhang Li who completed the Chinese 1–2 medal sweep on that occasion.

Following a low-key 2010, when she was sixth nationally and had a year's best of 58.49 m, she returned to form in the 2011 outdoor season. Liu equalled her personal best exactly at a Chinese Grand Prix meet in April and continued her regional dominance at the 2011 Asian Athletics Championships, where she won a second consecutive javelin title.

== International competitions ==
Year	Competition	Venue	Position	Notes
2009	Asian Championships	Guangzhou, China	1st	57.93 m
2009	East Asian Games	Hong Kong, China	1st	60.05 m
2011	Asian Championships	Kobe, Japan	1st	58.05 m
2011	World Championships	Daegu, South Korea	20th (q)	57.52 m

== National titles ==
- National Games of China
  - Javelin throw: 2009
