= 1996 Asian Junior Athletics Championships =

6th Asian Junior Championships
- Dates: 3 – 6 December
- Host city: New Delhi, India
- Level: Junior (under-20)
- Events: 41

The 1996 Asian Junior Athletics Championships was the sixth edition of the international athletics competition for Asian under-20 athletes, organised by the Asian Athletics Association. It took place from 3–6 December in New Delhi, India. It was the second time that the Indian capital had hosted the competition, following the 1992 edition. A total of 41 events were contested, 22 for male athletes and 19 for female athletes.

== Medal summary ==
=== Men ===
Event	Gold		Silver		Bronze	
100 metres	Kazuhiro Tamura (JPN)	10.64	Yu Ukita (JPN)	10.77	William To Wai Lok (HKG)	10.80
200 metres	Kazuhiro Tamura (JPN)	21.00 CR	Ajay Singh Raj (IND)	21.19	William To Wai Lok (HKG)	21.45
400 metres	Mubarak Al-Nubi (QAT)	47.15	P. H. Abdullah (IND)	47.72	Kim Jae-Da (KOR)	48.02
800 metres	Mehdi Jelodarzadeh (IRI)	1:52.46	Baiju Mirandi (IND)	1:52.89	Mohammad Reza Moulai (IRI)	1:52.91
1500 metres	Ahmed Yazdanian (IRI)	3:52.69	Nasser Suleiman (QAT)	3:53.20	Park Ho-Min (KOR)	3:53.70
5000 metres	Nasser Suleiman (QAT)	14:26.91	Gojen Singh (IND)	14:29.55	Wang Hongliang (CHN)	14:33.69
10,000 metres	Gojen Singh (IND)	30:43.01	G.S. Hariraju (IND)	31:12.16	Othman Suleiman (QAT)	31:23.47
110 metres hurdles	Khassif Mubarak (QAT)	14.11 CR	Tasuku Tanonaka (JPN)	14.31	Sahib Singh (IND)	14.33
400 metres hurdles	Mubarak Al-Nubi (QAT)	50.76 CR	Chen Tien-Wen (TPE)	51.23	Sahib Singh (IND)	51.64
3000 metres steeplechase	Sun Wenyong (CHN)	8:53.47 CR	Mitsunori Harada (JPN)	9:01.52	Aleksey Shestakov (KAZ)	9:03.49
4 × 100 m relay	Thailand (THA)	40.96	Japan (JPN)	41.09	Malaysia (MAS)	41.31
4 × 400 m relay	India (IND)	3:12.4	Qatar (QAT)	3:12.7	Thailand (THA)	3:13.6
10,000 metres walk	Wu Ping (CHN)	43:40.63	Sin Il-Yong (KOR)	44:08.90	Teoh Boon Lim (MAS)	44:33.84
High jump	Koji Ishii (JPN)	2.15 m	Zheng Decheng (CHN)	2.10 m	Tsai Sheng-Chieh (TPE)	2.10 m
Pole vault	Liu Yen-Tsung (TPE)	5.00 m	Jiang Anhua (CHN)	5.00 m	Takuyo Kanno (JPN)	4.90 m
Long jump	Huang Le (CHN)	7.68 m	Sanjay Kumar Rai (IND)	7.53 m	Sogoru Tomari (JPN)	7.34 m
Triple jump	Kim Hyuk (KOR)	15.80 m	Mohd Abdulaziz (QAT)	15.62 m	Sergey Bochkov (AZE)	15.42 m
Shot put	Mukesh Singh Kumar (IND)	17.03 m	Huang Yucheng (CHN)	16.82 m	Gurdev Singh (IND)	16.79 m
Discus throw	Rashid Shafi Al-Dosari (QAT)	50.36 m	Lu Dangling (CHN)	49.03 m	Abbas Samimi (IRI)	48.96 m
Hammer throw	Anoop Singh Punia (IND)	64.60 m CR	Satish Singh Sihay (IND)	61.84 m	Shalinder Singh (IND)	59.96 m
Javelin throw	Ramandeep Singh (IND)	74.42 m	Yu Nam-Sung (KOR)	70.84 m	Om Prakash Dudi (IND)	70.50 m
Decathlon	Du Xiaopeng (CHN)	7240 pts CR	Nobuhiro Katsuki (JPN)	6568 pts	Yang Chun-Hsien (TPE)	6468 pts

=== Women ===
Event	Gold		Silver		Bronze	
100 metres	Yang Xiaoyu (CHN)	11.92	Chen Shu-Chuan (TPE)	12.03	Velu Pandeeswari (IND)	12.08
200 metres	Velu Pandeeswari (IND)	24.21	Saraswati Dey (IND)	24.35	Chen Shu-Chuan (TPE)	24.39
400 metres	Vanaja Somaiah (IND)	55.10	Paramjit Kaur (IND)	55.48	Zhang Chunxiang (CHN)	56.19
800 metres	Ryoko Takezawa (JPN)	2:07.76	Sunita Dahiya (IND)	2:10.59	Oksana Ivashenko (KAZ)	2:11.72
1500 metres	Huh Yeon-Jung (KOR)	4:27.61	Hisae Yoshimatsu (JPN)	4:28.79	Liu Chang (CHN)	4:29.54
3000 metres	Wang Zhongfen (CHN)	9:26.69	Hisae Yoshimatsu (JPN)	9:35.09	Sunita Rani (IND)	9:39.95
5000 metres	Wang Zhongfen (CHN)	16:43.56	Sunita Rani (IND)	16:50.33	Rupinder Kaur (IND)	17:05.00
100 metres hurdles	Zhu Shuying (CHN)	13.65	He Kaiying (CHN)	13.84	Tomoko Motegi (JPN)	13.98
400 metres hurdles	Li Rui (CHN)	58.19	Debi Bose (IND)	58.81	Svetlana Badrankova (KAZ)	59.15
4 × 100 m relay	India (IND)	45.85	China (CHN)	46.44	Singapore (SIN)	49.35
4 × 400 m relay	India (IND)	3:47.50	Thailand (THA)	3:48.72	China (CHN)	3:49.31
5000 metres walk	Zhu Qiaomei (CHN)	24:04.79	Xue Ailing (CHN)	24:19.85	Paramjit Kaur (IND)	24:52.60
High jump	Liang Xiuli (CHN)	1.76 m	Shen Lingling (CHN)	1.76 m	Jaicy Thomas (IND)	1.70 m
Long jump	Guan Yingnan (CHN)	6.31 m	Feng Jie (CHN)	6.20 m	Mieko Shigehara (JPN)	6.05 m
Triple jump	Tamara Konkova (KAZ)	13.17 m	Qiu Qin (CHN)	12.98 m	Wang Kuo-huei (TPE)	12.69 m
Shot put	Qian Chunhua (CHN)	15.58 m	Mao Lingyan (CHN)	14.96 m	Yoko Toyonaga (JPN)	14.70 m
Discus throw	Liu Yanxia (CHN)	55.30 m	Sugan Yadav Kumar (IND)	53.76 m	Zhang Hongbo (CHN)	48.36 m
Javelin throw	Wang Yaning (CHN)	57.92 m	Zhang Li (CHN)	55.34 m	Park Ho-hyun (KOR)	48.68 m
Heptathlon	Soma Biswas (IND)	5046 pts	Yuki Nakata (JPN)	5014 pts	Pramila Ganapathy (IND)	4853 pts

== 1996 Medal Table ==
Rank	Nation	Gold	Silver	Bronze	Total
1	China (CHN)	15	12	5	32
2	India (IND)	10	13	11	34
3	Qatar (QAT)	5	3	1	9
4	Japan (JPN)	4	8	5	17
5	South Korea (KOR)	2	2	3	7
6	Iran (IRI)	2	0	2	4
7	Chinese Taipei (TPE)	1	2	4	7
8	Thailand (THA)	1	1	1	3
9	Hong Kong (HKG)	0	0	2	2
9	Malaysia (MAS)	0	0	2	2
11	Azerbaijan (AZE)	0	0	1	1
11	Singapore (SIN)	0	0	1	1
Totals (12 entries)		40	41	38	119
