= Athletics at the 2021 Summer World University Games – Women's javelin throw =

The women's javelin throw event at the 2021 Summer World University Games was held on 1 and 3 August 2023 at the Shuangliu Sports Centre Stadium in Chengdu, China.

== Medalists ==
Gold	Silver	Bronze
Eda Tuğsuz; Turkey	Su Lingdan; China	Jana van Schalkwyk; South Africa

== Results ==
=== Qualification ===
Qualification: Qualifying performance 60.00 (Q) or at least 12 best performers (q) advance to the final.

Rank	Group	Name	Nationality	#1	#2	#3	Result	Note
1	B	Liao Yu	China	55.55	53.98	–	55.55	q
2	A	Jariya Wichaidit	Thailand	47.12	52.49	54.93	54.93	q
3	B	Jana van Schalkwyk	South Africa	54.85	52.15	–	54.85	q
4	A	Su Lingdan	China	x	x	54.70	54.70	q
5	A	Esra Türkmen	Turkey	54.68	51.35	x	54.68	q
6	B	Eda Tuğsuz	Turkey	54.45	54.63	52.99	54.63	q
7	A	McKyla van der Westhuizen	South Africa	49.89	53.22	50.16	53.22	q
8	B	Lee Ga-hui	South Korea	50.29	48.51	52.05	52.05	q
9	B	Jana Lowka	Germany	49.69	52.04	x	52.04	q
10	A	Jennet Muhamowa	Turkmenistan	45.94	51.65	x	51.65	q
11	B	Chiara-Belinda Schuler	Austria	46.99	49.93	x	49.93	q
12	A	Federica Botter	Italy	46.87	48.34	47.13	48.34	q
13	B	Ida Eikeng	Norway	43.93	48.06	40.55	48.06	
14	B	Erika Lukach	Ukraine	45.87	45.15	47.71	47.71	
15	A	Napsugár Eszenyi	Hungary	40.68	43.88	43.08	43.88	
16	B	Wilma Benítez	Peru	40.54	40.49	42.75	42.75	
17	A	Yun Se-jin	South Korea	x	42.42	x	42.42	
18	B	Harita Harita	India	x	42.15	x	42.15	
19	B	Gabriela Andrukonis	Poland	41.69	–	–	41.69	
20	A	Fira Firliana Yunita	Indonesia	40.56	41.68	39.41	41.68	
21	A	Rian Boub	United States	38.86	36.67	x	38.86	
22	A	Wayne Nkomo	Zimbabwe	33.06	36.36	38.27	38.27	
23	A	Andreza Reis	Brazil	34.39	34.46	36.65	36.65	

=== Final ===
Rank	Name	Nationality	#1	#2	#3	#4	#5	#6	Result	Notes
1st place, gold medalist(s)	Eda Tuğsuz	Turkey	x	59.05	x	x	x	x	59.05	
2nd place, silver medalist(s)	Su Lingdan	China	51.97	53.77	55.36	56.72	57.87	56.95	57.87	
3rd place, bronze medalist(s)	Jana van Schalkwyk	South Africa	50.91	55.59	54.62	55.49	57.45	56.18	57.45	PB
4	Esra Türkmen	Turkey	56.00	51.43	54.34	51.35	55.33	x	56.00	
5	McKyla van der Westhuizen	South Africa	50.49	51.48	53.99	51.69	52.98	55.83	55.83	SB
6	Jariya Wichaidit	Thailand	54.59	53.23	x	50.93	53.78	x	54.59	
7	Liao Yu	China	48.75	52.87	53.32	x	53.03	54.17	54.17	
8	Jana Lowka	Germany	49.44	52.60	x	52.02	52.67	52.72	52.72	
9	Lee Ga-hui	South Korea	49.66	x	50.77				50.77	
10	Jennet Muhamowa	Turkmenistan	49.61	46.32	47.75				49.61	
11	Federica Botter	Italy	46.65	48.79	x				48.79	
12	Chiara-Belinda Schuler	Austria	45.66	46.27	x				46.27	
