= Gurmeet Kaur =

Indian javelin thrower

Medal record

Women's athletics

Representing India

Asian Championships
Silver medal – second place	2000 Jakarta	Javelin throw
Bronze medal – third place	1998 Fukuoka	Javelin throw

Gurmeet Kaur Rai (born 20 June 1970) is a retired female javelin thrower from India. She set her personal best (58.64 metres) on 17 July 2000 at a meet in Bangalore, which was the national record until 2014, when it was beaten by Annu Rani.

== International competitions ==
Year	Competition	Venue	Position	Notes
Representing India
1998	Asian Championships	Fukuoka, Japan	3rd	55.35 m
1998	Asian Games	Bangkok, Thailand	3rd	59.00 m
1999	World Championships	Seville, Spain	26th	51.97 m
2000	Asian Championships	Jakarta, Indonesia	2nd	55.65 m
2000	Olympic Games	Sydney, Australia	32nd	52.78 m
2003	Afro-Asian Games	Hyderabad, India	2nd	53.37 m
2004	South Asian Games	Islamabad, Pakistan	2nd	51.27 m
2006	South Asian Games	Colombo, Sri Lanka	3rd	46.45 m

== Career ==
Gurmeet Kaur represented the country at javelin meets internationally, and was a member of the Indian contingent at the Sydney Olympics 2000. She could not participate in the 2004 Olympics due to the tragic early death of her husband. She is also an employee of India's largest insurance company, the Life Insurance Corporation, and was the Assistant Administrative Officer in LIC New Delhi.
