= Zhang Li (javelin thrower, born 1978) =

Chinese javelin thrower

Medal record

Women's athletics

Representing China

Asian Championships
Bronze medal – third place	2000 Jakarta	Javelin throw

Zhang Li (Chinese: 张丽; pinyin: Zhāng Lì; born 19 October 1978) is a Chinese former track and field athlete who competed in the women's javelin throw. Her greatest achievement was a gold medal at the 2007 Military World Games in a world military record mark of 59.96 m (196 ft 8 1/2 in). This was her lifetime best. She won an Asian Championship bronze in 2000 and took the bronze medal at the 2001 East Asian Games. She was the silver medallist at the 1996 Asian Junior Athletics Championships. She retired in 2009.

== International competitions ==
Year	Competition	Venue	Position	Notes
1996	Asian Junior Championships	New Delhi, India	2nd	55.34 m
2000	Asian Championships	Jakarta, Indonesia	3rd	55.07 m
2001	East Asian Games	Osaka, Japan	3rd	55.13 m
2007	Military World Games	Hyderabad, India	1st	59.96 m
