= Liliya Dusmetova =

Uzbekistani javelin thrower

Liliya Dusmetova (born 11 February 1981) is an Uzbekistani javelin thrower.

She finished fourth at the 2005 Asian Championships. She also competed at the 2004 Olympic Games without reaching the final.

Her personal best throw is 56.17 metres, achieved in May 2004 in Tashkent.

== Competition record ==
Year	Competition	Venue	Position	Notes
Representing Uzbekistan
1999	Asian Junior Championships	Singapore	7th	44.00 m
2004	Olympic Games	Athens, Greece	38th (q)	52.46 m
2005	Asian Championships	Incheon, South Korea	4th	54.52 m
2007	Asian Championships	Amman, Jordan	4th	51.34 m
2009	Asian Championships	Guangzhou, China	5th	52.25 m
