= 2017 Asian Athletics Championships – Women's javelin throw =

The women's javelin throw at the 2017 Asian Athletics Championships was held on 6 July.

== Results ==
| Rank | Name | Nationality | #1 | #2 | #3 | #4 | #5 | #6 | Result | Notes |
|---|---|---|---|---|---|---|---|---|---|---|
| 1st place, gold medalist(s) | Li Lingwei | China | 60.79 | 61.76 | x | x | 63.06 | 62.05 | 63.06 | CR |
| 2nd place, silver medalist(s) | Dilhani Lekamge | Sri Lanka | 52.92 | 53.03 | 56.86 | 55.68 | 58.11 | 56.14 | 58.11 | PB |
| 3rd place, bronze medalist(s) | Annu Rani | India | 57.32 | 54.75 | 55.59 | 52.92 | 53.50 | x | 57.32 | |
| 4 | Su Lingdan | China | 49.91 | 53.65 | 55.94 | 57.00 | 54.17 | 55.87 | 57.00 | |
| 5 | Risa Miyashita | Japan | 54.57 | 53.40 | 54.72 | 51.10 | 51.79 | 54.22 | 54.72 | |
| 6 | Li Hui-jun | Chinese Taipei | 53.65 | 50.55 | x | 54.39 | 53.91 | 53.34 | 54.39 | |
| 7 | Gim Gyeong-ae | South Korea | 47.87 | 49.92 | 53.68 | 51.67 | 52.28 | 49.97 | 53.68 | |
| 8 | Poonam Rani | India | 52.56 | 50.07 | 52.17 | 48.07 | 47.52 | 47.74 | 52.56 | |
| 9 | Natta Nachan | Thailand | 48.65 | 50.97 | 50.41 | | | | 50.97 | |
| 10 | Suman Devi | India | 49.85 | 48.58 | 50.90 | | | | 50.90 | |
| 11 | Varvara Nazarova | Kazakhstan | 40.90 | 49.56 | 48.55 | | | | 49.56 | |
| 12 | Sahar Ziaei Sisakht | Iran | 44.93 | 43.93 | 46.80 | | | | 46.80 | |
| 13 | Chandra Kala | Nepal | 40.23 | 43.46 | 33.91 | | | | 43.46 | |

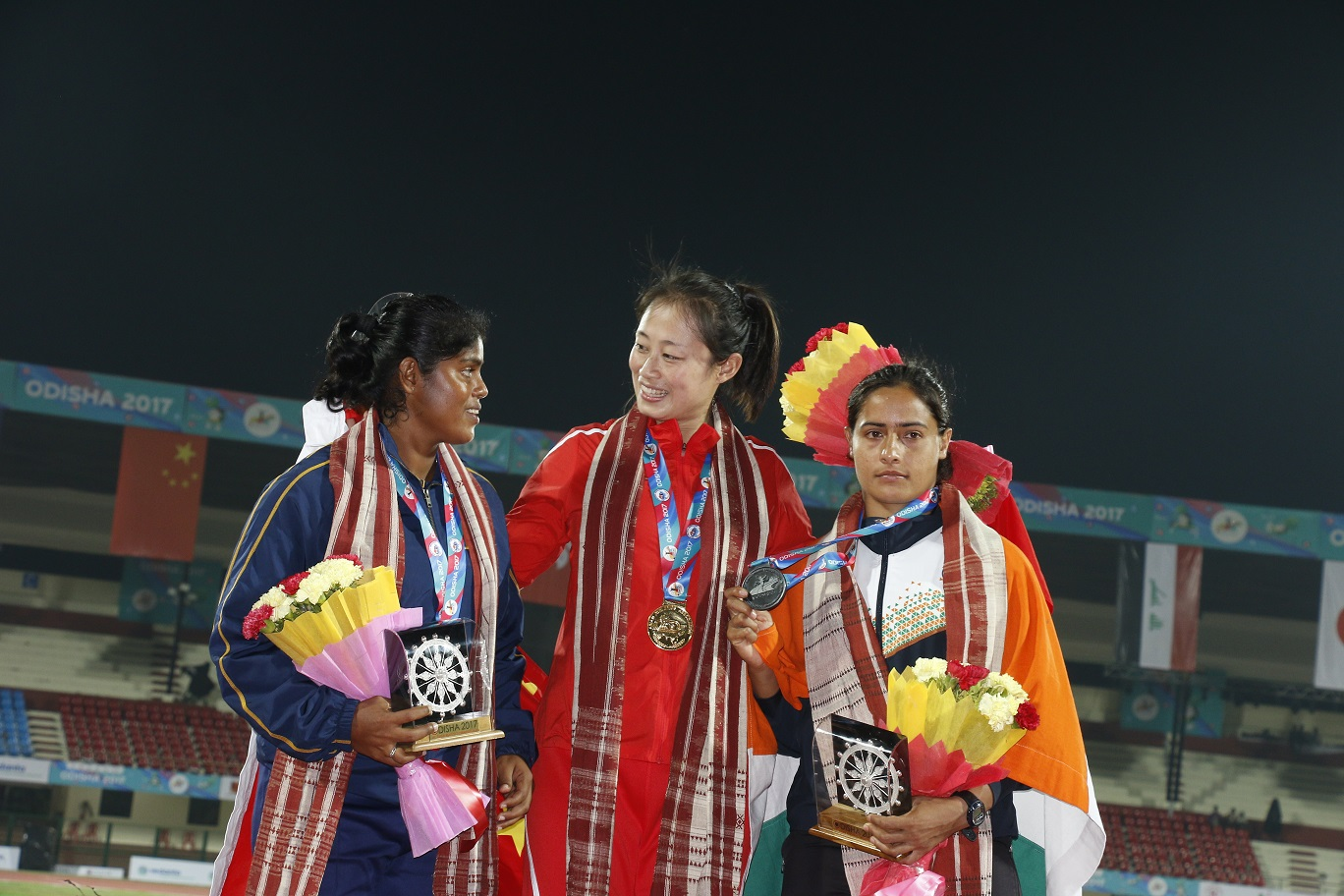
Silver, Gold and Bronze
