= Athletics at the 1998 Asian Games – Women's javelin throw =

Women's javelin throw at the 1998 Asian Games
- Venue: Thammasat Stadium
- Dates: 14 December 1998
- Competitors: 6 from 5 nations

Medalists
| gold medal | Lee Young-sun | South Korea |
| silver medal | Liang Lili | China |
| bronze medal | Gurmeet Kaur | India |

The women's javelin throw competition at the 1998 Asian Games in Bangkok, Thailand was held on 14 December at the Thammasat Stadium.

== Schedule ==
All times are Indochina Time (UTC+07:00)

| Date | Time | Event |
|---|---|---|
| Monday, 14 December 1998 | 14:00 | Final |

== Results ==
| Rank | Athlete | Result | Notes |
|---|---|---|---|
| 1st place, gold medalist(s) | Lee Young-sun (KOR) | 62.09 | |
| 2nd place, silver medalist(s) | Liang Lili (CHN) | 60.11 | |
| 3rd place, bronze medalist(s) | Gurmeet Kaur (IND) | 59.00 | |
| 4 | Li Lei (CHN) | 56.12 | |
| 5 | Harumi Yamamoto (JPN) | 55.89 | |
| 6 | Chatwadee Suthorn (THA) | 50.97 | |
