= Su Lingdan =

Chinese javelin thrower (born 1997)

Personal information
- Born: 12 January 1997 (age 29)
- Education: Tsinghua University
- Height: 1.75 m (5 ft 9 in)
- Weight: 59 kg (130 lb)

Sport
- Sport: Athletics
- Event: Javelin throw
Medal record
Women's athletics
Representing China
Asian Championships
| Gold medal – first place | 2025 Gumi | Javelin throw |
Summer World University Games
| Silver medal – second place | 2021 Chengdu | Javelin throw |

Su Lingdan (simplified Chinese: 苏玲丹; traditional Chinese: 蘇玲丹; pinyin: Sū Líng Dān, born 12 January 1997) is a Chinese athlete specialising in the javelin throw. She represented her country at the 2019 World Championships without qualifying for the final.

Her personal best in the event is 63.29 metres set in Gumi in 2025.

== International competitions ==
| Year | Competition | Venue | Position | Event | Notes |
Representing China
| 2016 | Asian Junior Championships | Ho Chi Minh City, Vietnam | 1st | Javelin throw | 57.32 m |
| 2017 | Asian Championships | Bhubaneswar, India | 4th | Javelin throw | 57.00 m |
| 2017 | Universiade | Taipei, Taiwan | 8th | Javelin throw | 57.20 m |
| 2019 | Universiade | Naples, Italy | 5th | Javelin throw | 56.89 m |
| 2019 | World Championships | Doha, Qatar | 19th (q) | Javelin throw | 58.56 m |
| 2023 | World University Games | Chengdu, China | 2nd | Javelin throw | 57.87 m |
| 2025 | Asian Championships | Gumi, South Korea | 1st | Javelin throw | 63.29 m |
