= Natta Nachan =

Thai javelin thrower (born 1990)

Personal information
- Born: 6 April 1990 (age 36) Udon Thani, Thailand

Sport
- Sport: Athletics
- Event: Javelin throw

Natta Nachan (Thai: ณัฏฐา นาชาญ; born 6 April 1990) is a Thai athlete specialising in the javelin throw. She won a bronze medal at the 2019 Asian Championships. Additionally, she won several medals at the Southeast Asian Games.

Her personal best in the event is 56.01 metres set in Doha in 2019.

== International competitions ==
Year	Competition	Venue	Position	Event	Notes
Representing Thailand
2009	Southeast Asian Games	Vientiane, Laos	1st	Javelin throw	45.00 m
2010	Asian Games	Guangzhou, China	7th	Javelin throw	50.88 m
2011	Southeast Asian Games	Palembang, Indonesia	1st	Javelin throw	48.80 m
2013	Southeast Asian Games	Naypyidaw, Myanmar	2nd	Javelin throw	50.37 m
2014	Asian Games	Incheon, South Korea	7th	Javelin throw	52.16 m
2015	Southeast Asian Games	Singapore	1st	Javelin throw	54.38 m
2017	Asian Championships	Bhubaneswar, India	9th	Javelin throw	50.97 m
2018	Asian Games	Jakarta, Indonesia	7th	Javelin throw	53.32 m
2019	Asian Championships	Doha, Qatar	3rd	Javelin throw	56.01 m
