= 2000 Asian Athletics Championships – Women's javelin throw =

The women's javelin throw event at the 2000 Asian Athletics Championships was held in Jakarta, Indonesia on 30 August. It was the first edition of the championships after the introduction of the new model of javelin thus the winning result was automatically the new championships record.

== Results ==
Rank	Name	Nationality	#1	#2	#3	#4	#5	#6	Result	Notes
1st place, gold medalist(s)	Lee Young-Sun	South Korea	54.94	55.78	52.68	x	x	53.47	55.78	CR
2nd place, silver medalist(s)	Gurmeet Kaur	India	x	53.01	52.96	55.65	–	x	55.65	
3rd place, bronze medalist(s)	Zhang Li	China	52.34	55.07	x	54.46	x	x	55.07	
4	Yayoi Shibano	Japan							51.99	
5	Cheng Shu-Chen	Chinese Taipei							51.53	
6	Ni Ketut Mudiani	Indonesia							49.87	NR
7	Tatyana Sudarikova	Kyrgyzstan							47.45	
8	Shabana Kausar	Pakistan							35.51	
