= Peru at the 2021 Summer World University Games =

- Flag of Peru
- IOC code: PER

in Chengdu, China 28 July 2023 – 8 August 2023
- Competitors: 7 (3 men and 4 women)
- Medals: Gold 0 Silver 0 Bronze 0 Total 0

Summer World University Games appearances
- 1959; 1961; 1963; 1965; 1967; 1970; 1973; 1975; 1977; 1979; 1981; 1983; 1985; 1987; 1989; 1991; 1993; 1995; 1997; 1999; 2001; 2003; 2005; 2007; 2009; 2011; 2013; 2015; 2017; 2019; 2021; 2025; 2027

Peru competed at the 2021 Summer World University Games in Chengdu, China held from 28 July to 8 August 2023.

== Competitors ==
Sport	Men	Women	Total
Artistic gymnastics	1	0	1
Athletics	0	2	2
Judo	1	1	2
Shooting	0	1	1
Taekwondo	1	0	1
Total	3	4	7

== Artistic gymnastics ==
Men

Athlete	Event	Qualification								Final							
Athlete	Event	Apparatus						Total	Rank	Apparatus						Total	Rank
Athlete	Event	F	PH	R	V	PB	HB	Total	Rank	F	PH	R	V	PB	HB	Total	Rank
Nicolas Garfias	All-around	12.133	11.066	11.500	12.600	11.500	13.333	72.132	51	Did not advance							

== Athletics ==
Women

Field

Athlete	Event	Qualification		Final	
Athlete	Event	Result	Rank	Result	Rank
Wilma Benites	Javelin throw	42.75	16	Did not advance	
Claudia Talledo	Shot put	10.44	16	Did not advance	

== Judo ==
Athlete	Event	Round of 32	Round of 16	Quarter-finals	Semi-finals	Repechage	Final / BM	
Athlete	Event	Opponent score	Opponent score	Opponent score	Opponent score	Opponent score	Opponent score	Rank
Luis Paucar	Men's 100 kg	Accogli (ITA); L 00–10	Did not advance					
Rosita Leyton	Women's +78 kg	—	Chang (TPE); L 00–10	Did not advance				

== Shooting ==
Women

Athlete	Event	Qualification		Final	
Athlete	Event	Points	Rank	Points	Rank
Carmen Figueroa	10 metre air pistol	499	45	Did not advance	

== Taekwondo ==
Kyorugi

Athlete	Event	Round of 32	Round of 16	Quarter-finals	Semi-finals	Final	
Athlete	Event	Opponent score	Opponent score	Opponent score	Opponent score	Opponent score	Rank
Gerardo Abarca	Men's 54 kg	Bye	Vikash (IND); L 0–2	Did not advance			
