= Marina Saito =

Japanese javelin thrower

Personal information
- Born: 15 October 1995 (age 30) Ibaraki Prefecture, Japan
- Education: Kokushikan University
- Height: 1.64 m (5 ft 5 in)
- Weight: 65 kg (143 lb)

Sport
- Sport: Athletics
- Event: Javelin throw

Marina Saito (斉藤 真理菜, Saitō Marina; born 15 October 1995) is a Japanese athlete specialising in the javelin throw. She represented her country at the 2017 World Championships. In addition, she won the silver medal at the 2017 Summer Universiade.

Her personal best in the event is 62.37 metres set in Taipei in 2017.

== International competitions ==
Representing Japan
Year	Competition	Venue	Position	Notes
2017	World Championships	London, United Kingdom	16th (q)	60.86 m
2017	Universiade	Taipei, Taiwan	2nd	62.37 m
2018	Asian Games	Jakarta, Indonesia	4th	56.46 m
2019	Asian Championships	Doha, Qatar	9th	52.40 m
2023	Asian Championships	Bangkok, Thailand	1st	61.67 m
2023	World Championships	Budapest, Hungary	15th (q)	58.95 m
2023	Asian Games	Hangzhou, China	4th	61.10 m
2024	Olympic Games	Paris, France	21st (q)	59.42 m
