= Takako Miyake =

Japanese javelin thrower

Personal information
- Born: 22 July 1974 (age 52) Mito, Ibaraki, Japan

Sport
- Sport: Track and field
Medal record
Representing Japan
East Asian Games
Silver medal – second place	2001 Osaka	Javelin throw

Takako Miyake (三宅 貴子, Miyake Takako; born 22 July 1974) is a retired Japanese athlete who specialised in the javelin throw. She twice competed at World Championships failing to qualify for the final round. With a personal best of 61.15 metres, she is a former Japanese record holder in the event.

== International competitions ==
Representing Japan
Year	Competition	Venue	Position	Notes
1992	World Junior Championships	Seoul, South Korea	26th (q)	44.22 m
1995	Universiade	Fukuoka, Japan	8th	55.86 m
2001	East Asian Games	Osaka, Japan	2nd	56.61 m
2001	World Championships	Edmonton, Canada	18th (q)	56.05 m
2002	Asian Games	Busan, South Korea	7th	53.72 m
2003	World Championships	Paris, France	23rd (q)	52.26 m
2003	Asian Championships	Manila, Philippines	4th	49.75 m
