= Yuka Sato (javelin thrower) =

Japanese javelin thrower

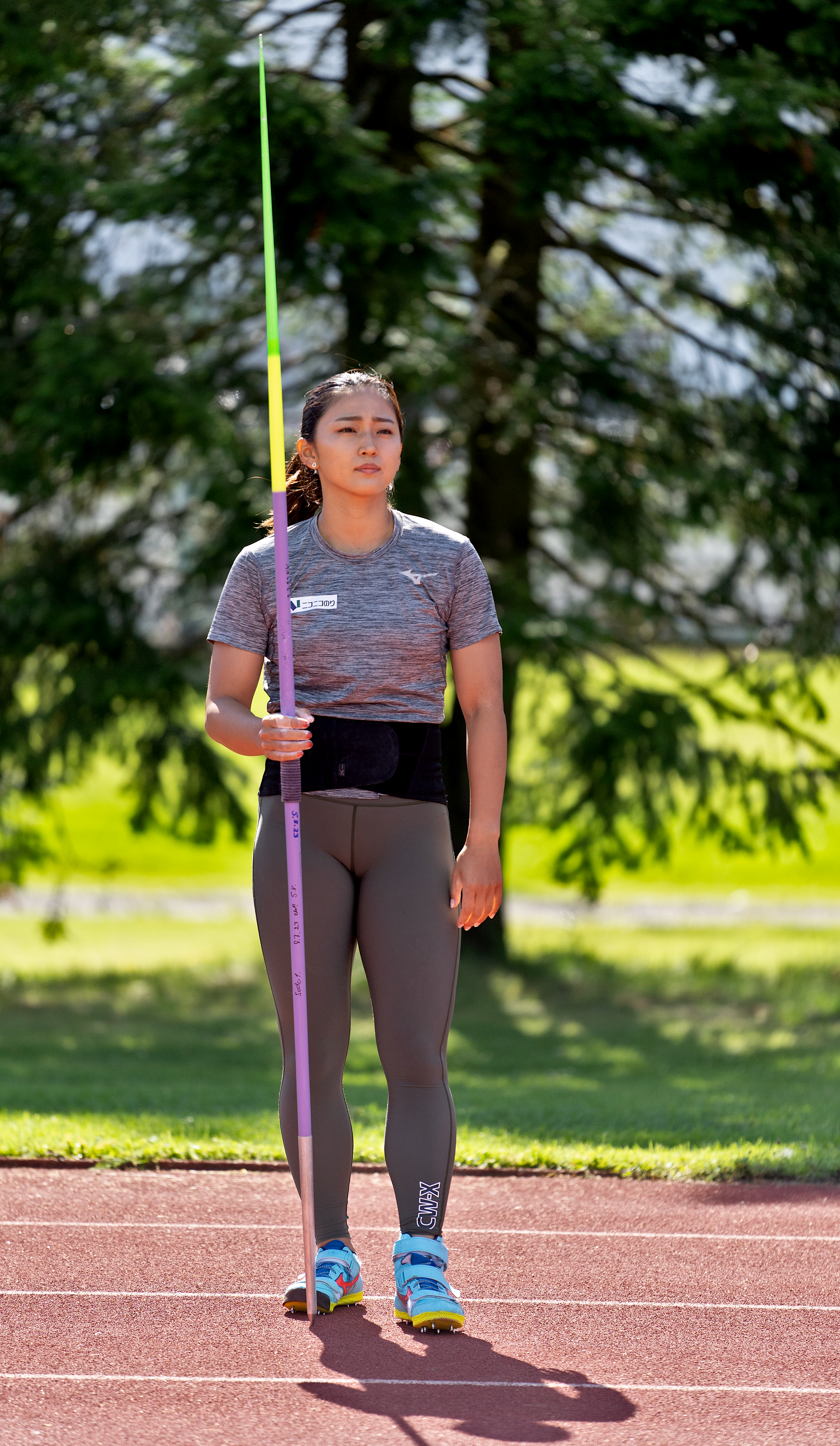

Personal information
- Born: 21 July 1992 (age 33) Osaka Prefecture, Japan
- Education: Higashiosaka College
- Height: 1.62 m (5 ft 4 in)
- Weight: 55 kg (121 lb)

Sport
- Sport: Athletics
- Event: Javelin throw

Yuka Sato (佐藤 友佳, Sato Yuka; born 21 July 1992) is a Japanese athlete specialising in the javelin throw. She represented her country at the 2019 World Championships without qualifying for the final. Earlier in her career she won a bronze medal at the 2011 Asian Championships.

Her personal best in the event is 62.88 metres set in Fukuoka in 2019.

== International competitions ==
Representing Japan
Year	Competition	Venue	Position	Event	Notes
2009	World Youth Championships	Brixen, Italy	9th	Javelin throw	48.14 m
2010	Asian Junior Championships	Hanoi, Vietnam	3rd	Javelin throw	48.46 m
2011	Asian Championships	Kobe, Japan	3rd	Javelin throw	54.16 m
2019	World Championships	Doha, Qatar	29th (q)	Javelin throw	55.03 m
