= Athletics at the 1993 Summer Universiade – Women's javelin throw =

The women's javelin throw event at the 1993 Summer Universiade was held at the UB Stadium in Buffalo, United States on 16 July 1993.

== Results ==
Rank	Athlete	Nationality	Result	Notes
1st place, gold medalist(s)	Lee Young-sun	South Korea	58.62	
2nd place, silver medalist(s)	Tanja Damaske	Germany	57.68	
3rd place, bronze medalist(s)	Valerie Tulloch	Canada	56.52	
4	Evi-Jeanette Völker	Germany	55.92	
5	Zhang Guihua	China	54.96	
6	Kaye Nordstrom	New Zealand	54.88	
7	Nicole Carroll	United States	53.68	
8	Heather Berlin	United States	53.48	
9	Cristina Larrea	Spain	51.28	
10	Anikó Koczka	Hungary	47.30	
11	Belén Palacios	Spain	41.88	
12	María Ordoñez	Ecuador	39.88	
