= 2003 Asian Athletics Championships – Women's javelin throw =

The women's javelin throw event at the 2003 Asian Athletics Championships was held in Manila, Philippines on September 23.

== Results ==
Rank	Name	Nationality	Result	Notes
1st place, gold medalist(s)	Ma Ning	China	57.05	
2nd place, silver medalist(s)	Jang Jung-Yeon	South Korea	53.23	
3rd place, bronze medalist(s)	Anne Maheshi De Silva	Sri Lanka	50.18	
4	Takako Miyake	Japan	49.75	
5	Nadeeka Lakmali	Sri Lanka	48.94	
6	Gerlayn Amandoron	Philippines	47.95	SB
7	Rosie Villarito	Philippines	47.52	SB
8	Misa Nakano	Japan	46.38	
9	Shabana Kausar	Pakistan	36.58	
