= Wankhede =

Wankhede may refer to a Maratha caste :

- Apoorv Wankhade (born 1992), cricketer for Mumbai Indians and Vidarbha Cricket Association
- S. K. Wankhede (1914–1988), cricket administrator and politician
- Balasaheb Pandurang Wankhede (born 1988), Progressive farmer, trader and politician
- Subhash Bapurao Wankhede (born 1963), Indian politician, member of the Shiv Sena political party

== Other uses ==
- Wankhede Stadium, a cricket stadium in the Indian city of Mumbai
- Wankhed, a village in Maharashtra
