= Bhadane =

Village in Maharashtra

- village
- Location in Maharashtra, India Bhadane (India)
- Coordinates: 19.3466894°N 73.1792125°E
- Country: India
- State: Maharashtra
- District: Thane
- Taluka: Bhiwandi
- Elevation: 14 m (46 ft)

Population (2011)
  - Total: 2,749
- Time zone: UTC+5:30 (IST)
- 2011 census code: 552623

Bhadane is a village in the Thane district of Maharashtra, India. It is located in the Bhiwandi Taluka.

== Demographics ==
According to the 2011 census of India, Bhadane has 615 households. The effective literacy rate (i.e. the literacy rate of population excluding children aged 6 and below) is 78.05%.

Demographics (2011 Census)
| | Total | Male | Female |
|---|---|---|---|
| Population | 2749 | 1444 | 1305 |
| Children aged below 6 years | 398 | 209 | 189 |
| Scheduled caste | 206 | 109 | 97 |
| Scheduled tribe | 538 | 277 | 261 |
| Literates | 1835 | 1060 | 775 |
| Workers (all) | 1187 | 787 | 400 |
| Main workers (total) | 981 | 661 | 320 |
| Main workers: Cultivators | 214 | 106 | 108 |
| Main workers: Agricultural labourers | 274 | 210 | 64 |
| Main workers: Household industry workers | 7 | 7 | 0 |
| Main workers: Other | 486 | 338 | 148 |
| Marginal workers (total) | 206 | 126 | 80 |
| Marginal workers: Cultivators | 23 | 8 | 15 |
| Marginal workers: Agricultural labourers | 85 | 52 | 33 |
| Marginal workers: Household industry workers | 2 | 2 | 0 |
| Marginal workers: Others | 96 | 64 | 32 |
| Non-workers | 1562 | 657 | 905 |

== Bhadane Industrial Area ==
Maharashtra Industrial Development Corporation (MIDC) declared in March 2020 the development of the "Bhadane Industrial Area," which is over 265 acres of land allocated for setting up Warehousing and Logistics Park.

1. This Warehousing and Logistics Park is being developed to cater to warehouse needs of E-commerce companies, B2C companies to store, supply and distribute goods to major consumer markets of Mumbai, Thane and Kalyan.
2. By road, it is at a distance of 2 km from the touchdown of Samruddhi Mahamarg Highway, interchange of Delhi - Mumbai E-highway & the JNPT port spur of Samruddhi Mahamarg
3. Bhadane Industrial Area's infrastructure is being developed by MIDC providing Power, Water and Road access with master planning as per MIDC's DCR and FSI of One.
4. It will create direct job opportunities for 2500 persons and indirect employment for 5000 persons.
