= Yuki Ebihara =

Japanese javelin thrower (born 1985)

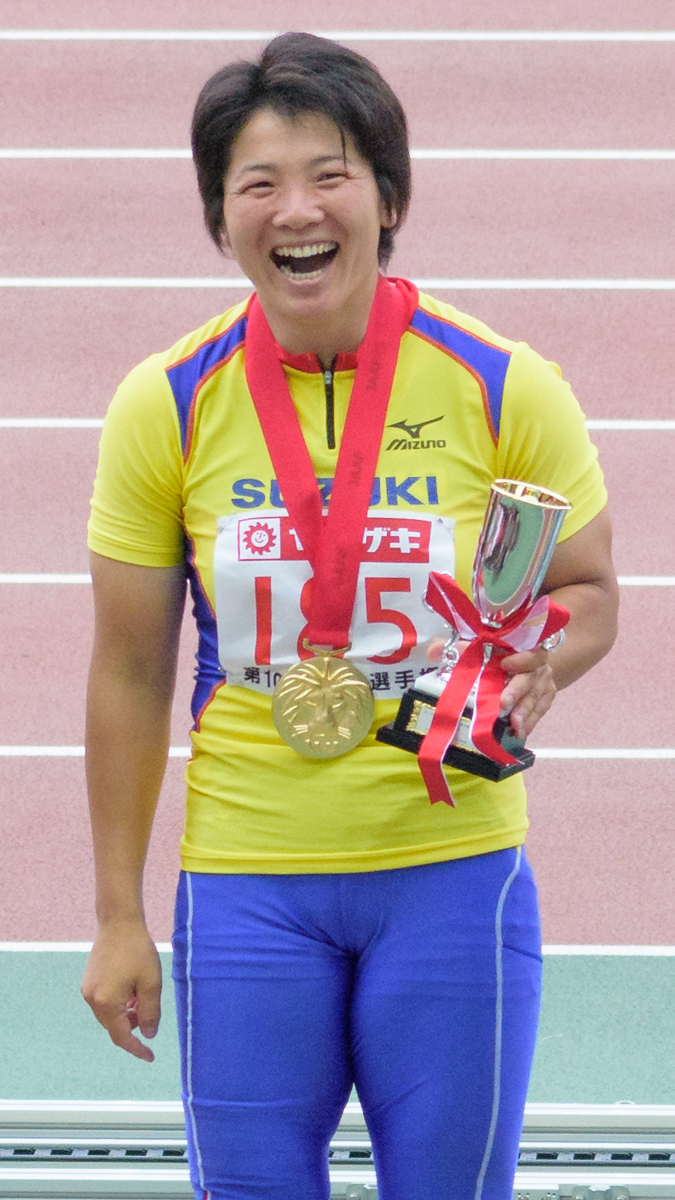
- Yuki Ebihara at 2017 Japan Championships

Personal information
- Born: 28 October 1985 (age 40) Kaminokawa, Tochigi, Japan
- Height: 1.64 m (5 ft 5 in)
- Weight: 66 kg (146 lb)

Sport
- Country: Japan
- Sport: Athletics
- Event: Javelin
Medal record
Asian Games
Gold medal – first place	2010 Guangzhou	Javelin throw
Bronze medal – third place	2006 Doha	Javelin throw
- Updated on 11 August 2012

Yuki Ebihara (海老原 有希, Ebihara Yuki; born 28 October 1985 in Tochigi Prefecture) is a Japanese track and field athlete who competes in the javelin throw.

She made her first impact as a junior in 2004 by winning the bronze medal at the Asian Junior Athletics Championships. She followed this up with a fifth place at the 2004 World Junior Championships in Athletics where she broke the national junior record with a mark of 54.44 metres.

Ebihara won her first senior national title in the javelin in 2006 and was selected to represent her country at the 2006 Asian Games. At the Games in Doha she threw a personal best of 57.47 m which brought her the bronze medal behind Ma Ning and Buoban Pamang. She represented Japan at the 2007 Summer Universiade but managed only eighth place.

She gained selection for the 2009 World Championships in Athletics and finished twelfth in the qualifying rounds of the competition. At the 2009 Asian Athletics Championships she just missed out on a medal, finishing in fourth place. After winning her third straight national title, she competed at the 2010 Asian Games. She defeated all opposition in the javelin with a winning throw of 61.56 m – a mark which was not only an Asian Games record but a Japanese record as well. She did not reach these heights the following year: her best of 2012 was a throw of 60.32 m and she was runner-up to Risa Miyashita at the national championships. However, she outperformed Miyashita at the 2011 World Championships in Athletics in Daegu by reaching the final and finishing ninth (Asia's best performer).

== See also ==
- List of Asian Games medalists in athletics
