= Ma Ning (javelin thrower) =

Chinese javelin thrower

- Simplified Chinese: 马宁
- Traditional Chinese: 馬寧
Transcriptions
Standard Mandarin
- Hanyu Pinyin: Mǎ Níng
- IPA: [mà nǐŋ]

Ma Ning
Medal record

Women's athletics

Representing China

Asian Championships
| Gold medal – first place | 2002 Colombo | Javelin throw |
| Gold medal – first place | 2003 Manila | Javelin throw |

Ma Ning (Chinese: 马宁; pinyin: Mǎ Níng; Mandarin pronunciation: [mà nǐŋ]; born November 4, 1983) is a female javelin thrower from PR China.Her personal best throw is 62.38 metres, achieved in June 2003 in Shijiazhuang. At the 2004 Summer Olympics she was eliminated in the first round of the javelin throw competition.

She represented her home area of Hebei at the 2005 National Games of China and won the javelin gold medal there.

== International competitions ==
| Year | Competition | Venue | Position | Notes |
Representing China
| 2002 | Asian Championships | Colombo, Sri Lanka | 1st | 57.15 m |
| 2002 | World Cup | Madrid, Spain | 6th | 56.60 m |
| 2003 | World Championships | Paris, France | 11th | 57.43 m |
| 2003 | Asian Championships | Manila, Philippines | 1st | 57.05 m |
| 2004 | Olympic Games | Athens, Greece | 18th (q) | 59.80 m |
| 2005 | Universiade | İzmir, Turkey | 2nd | 59.18 m |
| 2005 | East Asian Games | Macau | 1st | 61.95 m |
| 2006 | World Cup | Athens, Greece | 9th | 52.54 m |
| 2006 | Asian Games | Doha, Qatar | 2nd | 57.53 m |
