= Risa Miyashita =

Japanese javelin thrower

Personal information
- Born: 26 April 1984 (age 41) Osaka Prefecture, Japan
- Height: 1.71 m (5 ft 7 in)
- Weight: 72 kg (159 lb)

Sport
- Sport: Athletics
- Event: Javelin throw

Risa Miyashita (宮下 梨沙, Miyashita Risa; born 26 April 1984) is a Japanese athlete specialising in the javelin throw. She represented her country at the 2011 World Championships without qualifying for the final. In addition, she won two bronze medals at the Asian Championships.

Her personal best in the event is 60.86 metres set in Osaka in 2016.

== International competitions ==
Year	Competition	Venue	Position	Notes
Representing Japan
2011	Asian Championships	Kobe, Japan	4th	52.37 m
2011	World Championships	Daegu, South Korea	26th (q)	55.62 m
2013	Asian Championships	Pune, India	3rd	55.30 m
2015	Asian Championships	Wuhan, China	3rd	54.76 m
2017	Asian Championships	Bhubaneswar, India	5th	54.72 m
2017	World Championships	London, United Kingdom	29th (q)	53.83 m
2018	Asian Games	Jakarta, Indonesia	9th	51.05 m
2019	Asian Championships	Doha, Qatar	4th	55.27 m
