= Sae Takemoto =

Japanese athlete (born 1999)

Personal information
- Born: 23 November 1999 (age 26)

Sport
- Sport: Athletics
- Event: Javelin throw

Achievements and titles
- Personal best: Javelin: 62.39m (2021)
Medal record
Women's athletics
Representing JAP
Asian Championships
Bronze medal – third place	2025 Gumi	Javelin throw
Asian Junior Championships
Silver medal – second place	2018 Gifu	Javelin
Asian Games
Bronze medal – third place	2026 Aichi–Nagoya	Javelin throw

Sae Takemoto (born 23 November 1999) is a Japanese javelin thrower. She was a finalist at the 2022 World Athletics Championships.

== Early life ==
She is originally from Kobe City in Hyogo Prefecture, and she attended Amagasaki Municipal High School and Osaka University of Health and Sport Sciences.

== Career ==
She won a silver medal in the javelin throw at the 2018 Asian Junior Athletics Championships in Gifu, Japan.

In 2021, she achieved a personal best with the javelin of 62.39 metres to move to fourth on the Japanese all-time list. She competed at the 2022 World Athletics Championships in Eugene, Oregon, where she finished eleventh in the final with a throw of 57.93 metres. She placed sixth overall in the javelin at the delayed 2022 Asian Games held in Hangzhou, China, in October 2023, with a throw of 55.39 metres.

She won a bronze medal the javelin at the 2025 Asian Athletics Championships in Gumi, South Korea, in May 2025, with a throw of 58.94 metres. She competed at the 2025 World Athletics Championships in Tokyo, Japan, throwing 55.11 metres without advancing to the final.

== Personal life ==
She moved to Tokyo in April 2023 to train at the Ajinomoto National Training Centre.
