= Xue Juan (javelin thrower) =

Chinese javelin thrower

Personal information
- Nationality: Chinese
- Born: 10 February 1986 (age 40)
- Occupation: Javelin thrower
Medal record
Women's athletics
Representing China
Asian Championships
Silver medal – second place	2002 Colombo	Javelin throw

Xue Juan (Chinese: 薛娟; pinyin: Xuē Juān; born February 10, 1986) is a Chinese javelin thrower.

She won the silver medal at the 2002 Asian Championships, the gold medal at the 2003 World Youth Championships and finished sixth at the 2006 Asian Games. She also competed at the 2004 Olympic Games and the 2005 World Championships without reaching the finals.

Her personal best throw is 62.93 metres, first achieved in October 2003 in Changsha. This is the current junior world record. The Chinese record is currently held by Li Lei with 63.69 metres.
