= Lee Young-sun =

South Korean javelin thrower (born 1974)

Personal information
- Born: 21 February 1974 (age 52) Jeongseon County, South Korea

Sport
- Sport: Track and field
Medal record
Representing South Korea
Asian Games
Gold medal – first place	1998 Bangkok	Javelin throw
Gold medal – first place	2002 Busan	Javelin throw
Silver medal – second place	1994 Hiroshima	Javelin throw
Asian Championships
Gold medal – first place	2000 Jakarta	Javelin throw
Silver medal – second place	1991 Kuala Lumpur	Javelin throw
Silver medal – second place	1995 Jakarta	Javelin throw
Silver medal – second place	2005 Incheon	Javelin throw
Bronze medal – third place	2002 Colombo	Javelin throw
Summer Universiade
Gold medal – first place	1993 Buffalo	Javelin throw
Bronze medal – third place	1995 Fukuoka	Javelin throw

- Lee Young-sun
- Hangul: 이영선
- RR: I Yeongseon
- MR: I Yŏngsŏn

Lee Young-sun (Korean: 이영선; born 21 February 1974) is a retired female javelin thrower from South Korea. Her personal best throw is 58.87 metres, achieved at the 2002 Asian Games in Busan.

== International competitions ==
Year	Competition	Venue	Position	Notes
Representing South Korea
1991	Asian Championships	Kuala Lumpur, Malaysia	2nd	55.06 m
1992	Olympic Games	Barcelona, Spain	22nd (q)	55.10 m
1993	East Asian Games	Shanghai, China	2nd	61.44 m
1993	Universiade	Buffalo, United States	1st	58.62 m
1993	World Championships	Stuttgart, Germany	20th (q)	54.78 m
1994	Asian Games	Hiroshima, Japan	2nd	62.30 m
1995	Asian Championships	Jakarta, Indonesia	2nd	58.68 m
1995	Universiade	Fukuoka, Japan	3rd	61.62 m
1996	Olympic Games	Atlanta, United States	15th (q)	58.66 m
1997	East Asian Games	Busan, South Korea	2nd	56.10 m
1997	World Championships	Athens, Greece	22nd (q)	55.98 m
1997	Universiade	Catania, Italy	7th	57.22 m
1998	Asian Games	Bangkok, Thailand	1st	62.09 m
1999	World Championships	Seville, Spain	27th (q)	51.36 m*
2000	Asian Championships	Jakarta, Indonesia	1st	55.78 m*
2000	Olympic Games	Sydney, Australia	33rd (q)	49.84 m*
2002	Asian Championships	Colombo, Sri Lanka	3rd	53.72 m*
2002	Asian Games	Busan, South Korea	1st	58.87 m*
2005	Asian Championships	Incheon, South Korea	2nd	55.29 m*

* New model javelin
