= Li Lei (javelin thrower) =

Chinese javelin thrower

Personal information
- Born: 9 October 1974 (age 52) Beijing, China

Sport
- Sport: Track and field
Medal record
Representing China
Asian Championships
Gold medal – first place	1995 Jakarta	Javelin throw
Gold medal – first place	1998 Fukuoka	Javelin throw
East Asian Games
Gold medal – first place	1997 Busan	Javelin throw

Li Lei (born 9 October 1974) is a retired javelin thrower from PR China. Her personal best throw is 63.69 metres, achieved in June 2000 in Jinzhou.

She won the gold medals at the 1995 and the 1998 Asian Championships, and finished eighth at the 1996 Olympic Games, sixth at the 1998 IAAF World Cup and eleventh at the 2000 Olympic Games.

She represented her home region of Beijing at the 1997 National Games of China and placed third.

== International competitions ==
Year	Competition	Venue	Position	Notes
Representing China
1995	Asian Championships	Jakarta, Indonesia	1st	60.48 m
1996	Olympic Games	Atlanta, United States	8th	60.74 m
1997	East Asian Games	Busan, South Korea	1st	56.92 m
1998	Asian Championships	Fukuoka, Japan	1st	60.12 m
1998	World Cup	Johannesburg, South Africa	6th	59.45 m^{1}
1998	Asian Games	Bangkok, Thailand	4th	56.12 m
2000	Olympic Games	Sydney, Australia	11th	56.83 m

^{1}Representing Asia
