= Bahadarpur =

Indian village

Coordinates: 21.3039°N 76.2014°E

- Village
- Interactive map of Bahadarpur
- Country: India
- State: Uttar Pradesh
- District: Meerut

Population
  - Estimate (2016): 5,800

Bahadarpur is a village in Meerut district of Uttar Pradesh, India. It is approximately 6.5 kilometers from Mawana and 7 kilometers from Prikshitgarh.

The village's population is approximately 5,800 people, of which 70% are Punjabi Jat and 30% are Jatav. The principal crop is sugar cane, as well as wheat, potatoes, peas, cabbage, mustard, and pulses.

There is one primary and upper primary school in the village and two private schools for 10th class.

There are two temples in the village, Khichdi wale baba| temple and Shiv Mandir. About 40% of people in the village are employees in government or private sectors such as information technology, defense, police, teaching, and engineering.
