= Emika Yoshida =

Japanese javelin thrower (born 1985)

Personal information
- Born: 10 December 1985 (age 40)

Sport
- Country: Japan
- Sport: Track and field
- Event: Javelin throw
Medal record
East Asian Games
Bronze medal – third place	2009 Hong Kong	Javelin throw

Emika Yoshida (吉田 恵美可, Yoshida Emika; born 10 December 1985) is a Japanese athletics competitor competing in the javelin throw. In 2007, she competed in the women's javelin throw event at the 2007 World Championships in Athletics held in Osaka, Japan. She did not qualify to compete in the final.

In 2004, she finished in 9th place in the women's javelin throw at the 2004 World Junior Championships in Athletics held in Grosseto, Italy. She won the bronze medal in the women's javelin throw event at the 2009 East Asian Games held in Hong Kong.
