= Dilhani Lekamge =

Sri Lankan javelin thrower

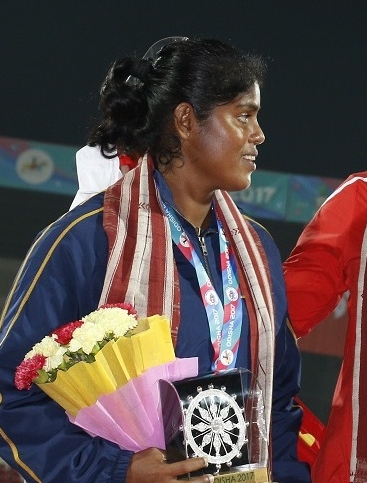
- Lekamge at the 2017 Asian Championships

Personal information
- Full name: Nadeesha Dilhani Lekamge
- Born: 14 October 1987 (age 39) Eheliyagoda, Sri Lanka
- Height: 1.6 m (5 ft 3 in)
- Military career
- Branch: Sri Lanka Army
- Rank: Corporal
- Unit: Women's Corps

Sport
- Sport: Track and field
- Event: Javelin throw

Achievements and titles
- Personal best: 61.57 m (2023)
Medal record
Women's athletics
Representing Sri Lanka
Asian Games
Silver medal – second place	2022 Hangzhou	Javelin throw
Asian Championships
Silver medal – second place	2017 Bhubaneswar	Javelin throw
Bronze medal – third place	2023 Bangkok	Javelin throw
Asian Throwing Championships
Silver medal – second place	2025 Mokpo	Javelin throw
Bronze medal – third place	2024 Mokpo	Javelin throw
South Asian Games
Gold medal – first place	2019 Kathmandu	Javelin throw
South Asian Championships
Gold medal – first place	2025 Ranchi	Javelin throw

Nadeesha Dilhani Lekamge (born 14 October 1987) is a Sri Lankan javelin thrower. She represented Sri Lanka in the women's javelin event at the 2024 Paris Olympics.

== Life ==
Lekamge was born on 14 October 1987 in the town of Eheliyagoda in Sri Lanka. She completed her education at the Mahinda School, Eheliyagoda.

She began her military career as a private in the Sri Lanka Army and, held the rank of corporal in the Sri Lanka Army Women's Corps.

She represented Sri Lanka in the women's javelin event at the 2024 Paris Olympics where she was 32nd.

In August 2026, Lekamge was in Bhubaneshwar, India where she won a silver medal at the World Athletics Continental Tour Championship.
