= Nadeeka Lakmali =

Sri Lankan javelin thrower (born 1981)

Personal information
- Full name: Nadeeka Lakmali Bambarenda Liyanage
- Nationality: Sri Lanka
- Born: 18 September 1981 (age 44) Elpitiya, Dakunu, Galle, Southern Province, Sri Lanka
- Height: 1.65 m (5 ft 5 in)
- Weight: 60 kg (132 lb)

Sport
- Country: Sri Lanka
- Sport: Athletics
- Event: Javelin throw

Achievements and titles
- World finals: IAAF World Championship - 2013
- Personal best: Javelin throw: 60.64 m (2013) NR
Medal record
Women's athletics
Representing Sri Lanka
Asian Championships
Silver medal – second place	2013 Pune	Javelin throw
Bronze medal – third place	2007 Amman	Javelin throw
South Asian Games
Silver medal – second place	2019 Kathmandu	Javelin throw
Bronze medal – third place	2016 Guwahati	Javelin throw
Military World Games
Bronze medal – third place	2019 Wuhan	Javelin throw

Nadeeka Lakmali Bambarenda Liyanage (born 18 September 1981 in Elpitiya, Galle) is a Sri Lankan javelin thrower. She is regarded one of the finest javelin throwers in Sri Lanka with global fame. She is also attached with the Sri Lanka Army Volunteer Force and current national record holder in women's javelin throw event.

== Life ==
Liyaanage won a bronze medal for the same category at the 2007 Asian Athletics Championships in Amman, Jordan, achieving her best throw at 52.59 metres.

Lakmali represented Sri Lanka at the 2008 Summer Olympics in Beijing, where she competed for the women's javelin throw. She performed the best throw of 54.28 metres, on her third and final attempt, finishing forty-third overall in the qualifying rounds.

She represented Sri Lanka at the 2010 Commonwealth Games which was held in New Delhi where she finished at seventh place in women's javelin throw event clearing a distance of 53.36 meters. Lakmali improved her personal best and national record to 59.32 metres on 30 June 2013 in Pihtipudas, Finland.

Lakmali gained first place in all 3 stages of 2013 Asian Athletics Grand Prix to win gold after clearing a distance of 56.83m during the first leg which was held at Thammasat University Ground. Later she renewed her national record to 60.16 at the 2013 Asian Athletics Championships in Pune, India along with winning the silver medal in the women's javelin throw event behind China's Li Lingwei. She also qualified for the IAAF world championships in Moscow in August. Just before the world championships, Lakmali competed in Sri Lanka Army Volunteer Forces' Inter-Regiment Athletics Championships where she broke her own national record once again. She achieved 60.64 metres. Lakmali qualified for the finals of the Javelin throw in 2013 IAAF world championships with a best of 60.39m from the Group B. Even though she was not able to match the automatic qualifying mark of 61.50m, she entered the finals as the next best performance from Group A and B. With this performance she became only the second athlete from Sri Lanka after sprinter Susanthika Jayasinghe to reach the final round at an IAAF World Athletics Championship. She finished 12th and last position in the final clearing a distance of 58.16m.

She trained with former Sri Lankan javelin thrower Dilhani Lekamge under until she left their coach A.J.Rodrigo to train elsewhere in 2014. She also represented Sri Lanka at the 2014 Commonwealth Games and finished at 6th place clearing distance of 59.04m in women's javelin throw event. At the 2016 South Asian Games representing Sri Lanka, she claimed bronze medal after clearing a distance of 54.82 meters.

In 2017 she represented her country in India at the 2017 Asian Athletics Championships in the women's javelin throw. The event was won by Li Lingwei but significantly Dilhani Lekamge matched her former training partner Nadeeka Lakmali and took the bronze. She also represented Sri Lanka at the 2019 South Asian Games and claimed silver medal in javelin throw event clearing 54.41m meanwhile incidentally Nadeeka Lekamge who herself admires Nadeeka Lakmali as her role model won the gold medal. She also claimed bronze medal at the 2019 Military World Games which was held in Wuhan clearing distance of 52.73m.

Lakmali is a Warrant Officer attached to the 4 Battalion (V), Sri Lanka Army Women’s Corps.
