= Annu Rani =

Indian javelin thrower (born 1992)

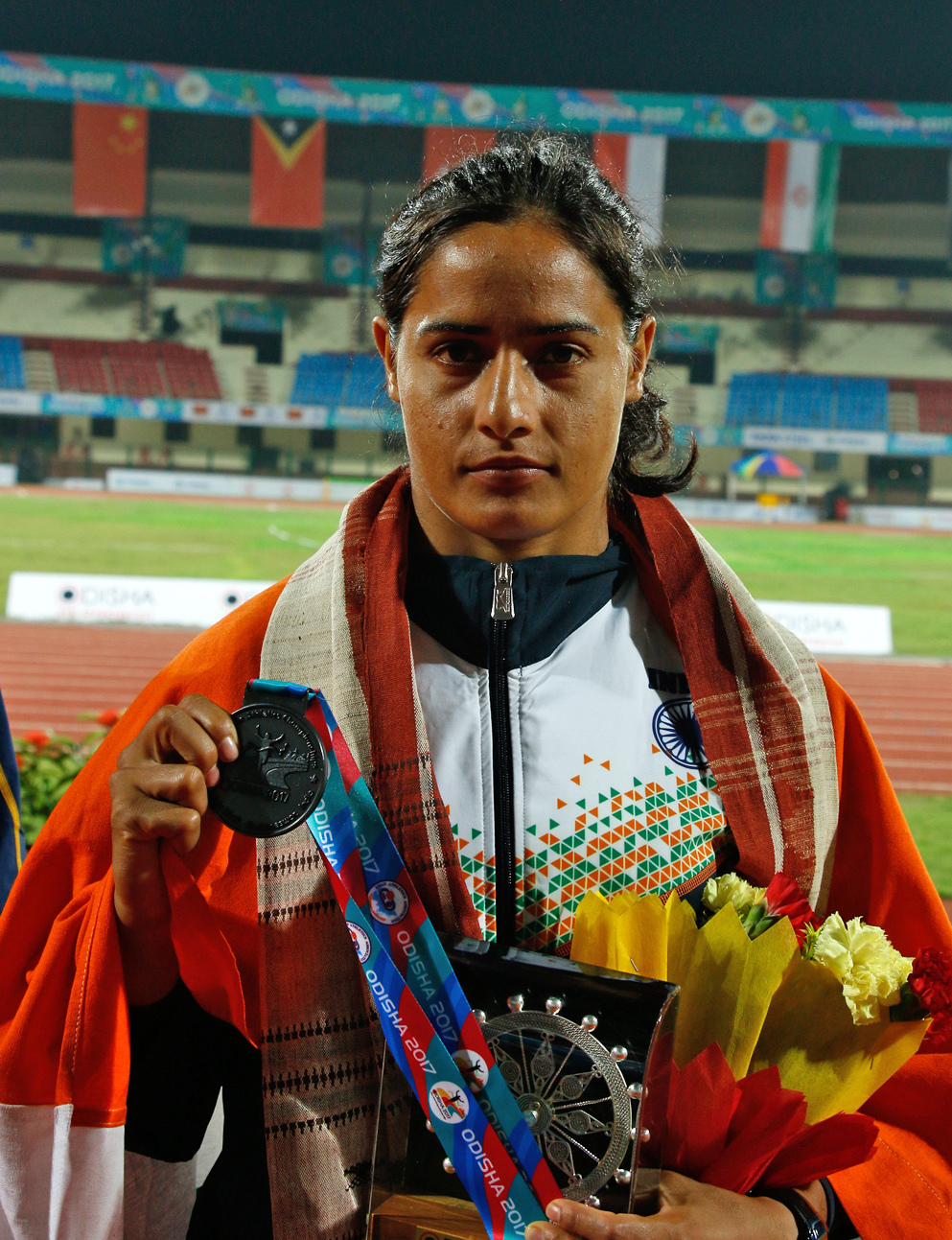
- Rani at the 2017 Asian Championships

Personal information
- Full name: Annu Rani Dharayan
- Born: 29 August 1992 (age 33) Bahadarpur, Uttar Pradesh, India
- Height: 1.65 m (5 ft 5 in)

Sport
- Sport: Athletics
- Event: Javelin throw
- Coached by: Sergey Makarov; Kashinath Naik

Achievements and titles
- Personal bests: 63.82 m NR (2022)
Medal record
Women's athletics
Representing India
Commonwealth Games
Bronze medal – third place	2022 Birmingham	Javelin throw
Asian Games
Gold medal – first place	2022 Hangzhou	Javelin throw
Bronze medal – third place	2014 Incheon	Javelin throw
Asian Championships
Silver medal – second place	2019 Doha	Javelin throw
Bronze medal – third place	2017 Bhubaneswar	Javelin throw
South Asian Games
Silver medal – second place	2016 Guwahati	Javelin throw

Annu Rani (born 29 August 1992) is an Indian javelin thrower. She is a two-time Olympian and an Asian Games gold medallist, and regarded as the flag bearer for India in women's javelin throw. She became the first Indian woman to reach the javelin throw final at the World Championships in 2019. At the 2022 Commonwealth Games, she won the bronze medal, becoming the first Indian woman to medal in javelin throw at the event.

== Early and personal life ==
Annu Rani was born on 29 August 1992 Bahadarpur, Uttar Pradesh in a family of farmers. Her athletic potential was first identified by her brother, Upendra, who observed her upper-body strength while she was playing cricket. He introduced her to javelin throwing and initially trained her by having her throw sugarcane sticks in open fields. Due to financial constraints, Annu initially used a self-made javelin fashioned from a bamboo stick.

She began competing in the javelin throw competitions in 2010 at the age of 18. Her training was initially supported by her brother, despite resistance from her family regarding her participation in sports. After she broke the national record in 2014, her family began supporting her athletic career.

Annu Rani married national kickboxing champion Sahil Bhardwaj on November 18, 2025.

== Career ==
In the 2014 National Inter-State Athletics Championship in Lucknow, Rani won the gold medal with a throw of 58.83 m, breaking a 14-year-old national record and qualifying her for the 2014 Commonwealth Games where she finished eighth. Later in the year, she won the bronze medal at the Asian Games in Incheon, South Korea, with a throw of 59.53 m. Two years later she broke her own record again at the National Inter-state Athletics Championship with a throw of 60.01 m. In March 2019, she broke her own record again with a throw of 62.34 m at the National Senior Athletics Championships in Patiala.

Rani won the silver medal at the 23rd Asian Athletics Championships in Qatar on 21 April 2019, which helped her qualify for the World Athletics Championships, becoming the first Indian woman javelin thrower to participate in World Athletics Championships. She won the bronze medal at the IAAF World Challenge event Golden Spike Ostrava in Ostrava, Czech Republic.

She won the Sportstar Aces Sportswoman of the Year Award in Athletics in 2020. She won the gold medal in the women's javelin throw event at the 59th National Open Athletics Championships.
