= Buoban Pamang =

Thai javelin thrower

Medal record

Women's athletics

Representing Thailand

Asian Championships
Gold medal – first place	2007 Amman	Javelin throw

Buoban Pamang (Thai: บัวบาน ผามั่ง; RTGS: Buaban Phamang, born 27 December 1983 in Chiang Rai) is a female javelin thrower from Thailand. In 2006, she won the Athletics at the Asian Games in a new national record of 61.31 metres. In 2007, she took another gold medal, at the 2007 Summer Universiade in another national record of 61.40 metres. Later that year she competed at the 2007 World Championships, but without reaching the final. The next year she competed at the 2008 Olympic Games.

== International competitions ==
Year	Competition	Venue	Position	Notes
Representing Thailand
2001	Asian Junior Championships	Bandar Seri Begawan, Brunei	2nd	54.51 m
2001	Southeast Asian Games	Kuala Lumpur, Malaysia	1st	54.80 m
2002	Asian Junior Championships	Bangkok, Thailand	6th	46.26 m
2003	Southeast Asian Games	Hanoi, Vietnam	1st	53.23 m
2005	Southeast Asian Games	Manila, Philippines	1st	55.06 m
2006	Asian Games	Doha, Qatar	1st	61.31 m
2007	Asian Championships	Amman, Jordan	1st	58.35 m
2007	Universiade	Bangkok, Thailand	1st	61.40 m
2007	World Championships	Osaka, Japan	23rd (q)	56.28 m
2008	Olympic Games	Beijing, China	28th (q)	56.35 m
