= Gim Gyeong-ae (javelin thrower) =

South Korean javelin thrower

Personal information
- Nationality: South Korea
- Born: 5 March 1988 (age 38) Namyangju, South Korea
- Height: 1.63 m (5 ft 4 in)
- Weight: 62 kg (137 lb)

Sport
- Sport: Athletics
- Event: Javelin throw
- College team: Korea National Sport University
- Team: Daejeon-si

Achievements and titles
- Personal best: Javelin throw: 58.76 m (2008)
Medal record
Women's athletics
Representing South Korea
Asian Games
Bronze medal – third place	2018 Jakarta	Javelin throw
Asian Championships
Silver medal – second place	2007 Amman	Javelin throw

Korean name
- Hangul: 김경애
- RR: Gim Gyeongae
- MR: Kim Kyŏngae

Gim Gyeong-ae (Korean: 김경애; born March 5, 1988), also spelled Kim Gyeong-ae, is a South Korean javelin thrower. She won a silver medal for the same category at the 2007 Asian Athletics Championships in Amman, Jordan, achieving her best throw at 53.01 metres.

Gim represented South Korea at the 2008 Summer Olympics in Beijing, where she competed for the women's javelin throw. She performed the best throw of 53.13 metres, on her third and final attempt, finishing forty-sixth overall in the qualifying rounds.
