= Latvia at the World Athletics Championships =

- Flag of Latvia
- WA code: LAT
- Medals: Gold 0 Silver 2 Bronze 1 Total 3

World Athletics Championships appearances (overview)
- 1993; 1995; 1997; 1999; 2001; 2003; 2005; 2007; 2009; 2011; 2013; 2015; 2017; 2019; 2022; 2023; 2025

Latvia has participated in every edition of the World Athletics Championships since 1993, two years after the USSR dissolution. Its first medal came nearly 20 years after its independence, when Ineta Radēviča third in the women's long jump at the 2011 World Championships in Athletics. Her medal was later upgraded to silver, after the russian jumper was caught on doping. Since then, they've stood on the podium two other times.

== Medalists ==
Medal	Name	Year	Event
Silver	Ineta Radēviča	2011 Daegu	Women's long jump
Bronze	Laura Ikauniece-Admidiņa	2015 Beijing	Women's heptatlon
Silver	Anete Sietiņa	2025 Tokyo	Women's javelin throw

=== By event ===
Event	Gold	Silver	Bronze	Total
Javelin throw	0	1	0	1
Long Jump	0	1	0	1
Heptathlon	0	0	1	1
Totals (3 entries)	0	2	1	3

=== By gender ===
Gender	Gold	Silver	Bronze	Total
Women	0	2	1	3
Men	0	0	0	0

== See also ==
- Latvia at the Olympics
- Latvia at the Paralympics
