= Latvia at the 2025 World Athletics Championships =

- Flag of Latvia
- WA code: LAT

in Tokyo, Japan 13 September 2025 – 21 September 2025
- Competitors: 4 (2 men and 2 women)
- Medals Ranked 27th: Gold 0 Silver 1 Bronze 0 Total 1

World Athletics Championships appearances (overview)
- 1993; 1995; 1997; 1999; 2001; 2003; 2005; 2007; 2009; 2011; 2013; 2015; 2017; 2019; 2022; 2023; 2025

Latvia competed at the 2025 World Athletics Championships in Tokyo, Japan, from 13 to 21 September 2025.

== Medallists ==
Medal	Athlete	Event	Date
Silver	Anete Sietiņa	Women's javelin throw	September 20

== Results ==
Latvia entered 2 male and 2 female athletes to the championships.

Key

- Q = Qualified for the next round
- q = Qualified for the next round as a fastest loser or, in field events, by position without achieving the qualifying target
- NR = National record
- PB = Personal best
- SB = Season best
- N/A = Round not applicable for the event

=== Men ===
Track and road events

Athlete	Event	Final	
Athlete	Event	Result	Rank
Raivo Saulgriezis	20 kilometres walk	1:27:25	41
Raivo Saulgriezis	35 kilometres walk	2:40:19	24

Field events

Athlete	Event	Qualification		Final	
Athlete	Event	Height	Position	Height	Position
Valters Kreišs	Pole vault	5.55	24	Did not advance	

=== Women ===
Field events

Athlete	Event	Qualification		Final	
Athlete	Event	Height	Position	Height	Position
Līna Mūze-Sirmā	Javelin throw	54.49	32	Did not advance	
Anete Sietiņa	Javelin throw	63.67 SB	3 Q	64.64 PB	2nd place, silver medalist(s)
