= 2026 World Athletics Ultimate Championship – Women's javelin throw =

Women's javelin throw at the 2026 World Athletics Ultimate Championship
- Venue: National Athletics Centre
- Location: Budapest, Hungary
- Dates: 12 September 2026 (final)
- Competitors: 8 from 8 nations
- Winning time: 68.92 m NR

Champion
- Haruka Kitaguchi; Japan

The women's javelin throw was held as a straight final at the 2026 World Athletics Ultimate Championship at the National Athletics Centre in Budapest, Hungary on 12 September 2026. It was the first time the World Ultimate Championship was held. Athletes qualified by wildcard or by their world ranking.

== Background ==
Global records before the 2026 World Athletics Ultimate Championship
Record	Distance	Athlete (nation)	Location	Date
World record	72.28 m	Barbora Špotáková (CZE)	Stuttgart, Germany	13 September 2008
World lead	71.74 m	Yan Ziyi (CHN)	Xiamen, China	23 May 2026

Area records before the 2026 World Athletics Ultimate Championship
Record	Distance	Athlete (nation)	Location	Date
African record	69.35 m	Sunette Viljoen (RSA)	New York City, United States	9 June 2012
Asian record	71.74 m	Yan Ziyi (CHN)	Xiamen, China	23 May 2026
European record	72.28 m	Barbora Špotáková (CZE)	Stuttgart, Germany	13 September 2008
North, Central American, and Caribbean record	71.70 m	Osleidys Menéndez (CUB)	Helsinki, Finland	14 August 2005
Oceanian record	68.92 m	Kathryn Mitchell (AUS)	Gold Coast, Australia	11 April 2018
South American record	67.34 m	Flor Ruiz (COL)	Santo Domingo, Dominican Republic	4 August 2026

== Qualification ==
For the javelin throw, eight athletes qualified, up to three by wildcard for winners of the event at the 2024 Summer Olympic, the 2025 World Athletics Championships, or the 2026 Diamond League final and the others by their position at the World Athletics Rankings for the event on 3 September 2026.

== Results ==
=== Final ===
The final was held on 12 September at 18:13 (UTC+2).

Place	Athlete	Nation	Round				Result	Notes
Place	Athlete	Nation	#1	#2	#3	#4	Result	Notes
1st place, gold medalist(s)	Haruka Kitaguchi	Japan	61.15	68.92	x	x	68.92 m	NR
2	Yan Ziyi	China	68.05	63.95	r		68.05 m	
3	Flor Ruiz	Colombia	60.16	62.62	x	64.84	64.84 m	
4	Mackenzie Little	Australia	58.59	61.49	63.37	55.87	63.37 m	SB
5	Adriana Vilagoš	Serbia	61.37	x	60.23		61.37 m	
6	Tori Moorby	New Zealand	56.30	58.95	x		58.95 m	
7	Anete Sietiņa	Latvia	58.17	56.22			58.17 m	
8	Sigrid Borge	Norway	50.88	x			50.88 m	
