= Latvia at the 2017 World Championships in Athletics =

- WA code: LAT
- Website: www.lat-athletics.lv

in London
- Competitors: 12
- Medals: Gold 0 Silver 0 Bronze 0 Total 0

World Championships in Athletics appearances
- 1993; 1995; 1997; 1999; 2001; 2003; 2005; 2007; 2009; 2011; 2013; 2015; 2017; 2019; 2022; 2023; 2025

Latvia competed at the 2017 World Championships in Athletics in London, Great Britain, from 4–13 August 2017.

== Results ==
(q – qualified, NM – no mark, SB – season best)

=== Men ===
Track and road events

Athlete	Event	Final	
Athlete	Event	Result	Rank
Valērijs Žolnerovičs	Marathon	DNF	–

Field events

Athlete	Event	Qualification		Final	
Athlete	Event	Distance	Position	Distance	Position
Elvijs Misāns	Triple jump	16.55	16	Did not advance	
Rolands Štrobinders	Javelin throw	79.68	19	Did not advance	

=== Women ===
Track and road events

Athlete	Event	Heat		Semifinal		Final	
Athlete	Event	Result	Rank	Result	Rank	Result	Rank
Sindija Bukša	200 metres	23.54	29	Did not advance			
Gunta Latiševa-Čudare	400 metres	51.37 PB	10 Q	51.57	12	Did not advance	
Anita Kažemāka	Marathon	—N/a				2:44:49 SB	53
Ilona Marhele	Marathon	—N/a				2:37:40 PB	31
Agnese Pastare	20 kilometres walk	—N/a				DQ	–

Field events

Athlete	Event	Qualification		Final	
Athlete	Event	Distance	Position	Distance	Position
Lauma Grīva	Long jump	6.58	5 q	6.54	9
Anete Kociņa	Javelin throw	62.26	13	Did not advance	
Madara Palameika	Javelin throw	59.54	21	Did not advance	

Combined events – Heptathlon

Athlete	Event	100H	HJ	SP	200 m	LJ	JT	800 m	Final	Rank
Laura Ikauniece-Admidiņa	Result	13.71	DNS	DNS	–	–	–	–	DNF	–
Laura Ikauniece-Admidiņa	Points	1020	0	0					DNF	–
