= Latvia at the 2015 World Championships in Athletics =

- WA code: LAT
- Website: lat-athletics.lv

in Beijing
- Competitors: 9
- Medals Ranked 32nd: Gold 0 Silver 0 Bronze 1 Total 1

World Championships in Athletics appearances
- 1993; 1995; 1997; 1999; 2001; 2003; 2005; 2007; 2009; 2011; 2013; 2015; 2017; 2019; 2022; 2023; 2025

Latvia competed at the 2015 World Championships in Athletics in Beijing, China, from 22–30 August 2015.

== Medalists ==
Medal	Athlete	Event	Date
Bronze	Laura Ikauniece-Admidiņa	Heptathlon	23 August

== Results ==
(q – qualified, NM – no mark, SB – season best)

=== Men ===
Track and road events

Athlete	Event	Heat		Semifinal		Final	
Athlete	Event	Result	Rank	Result	Rank	Result	Rank
Arnis Rumbenieks	50 kilometres walk	—N/a				4:28:55	38

Field events

Athlete	Event	Qualification		Final	
Athlete	Event	Distance	Position	Distance	Position
Mareks Ārents	Pole vault	5.55	25	did not advance	
Rolands Štrobinders	Javelin throw	79.11	19	did not advance	

=== Women ===
Track and road events

Athlete	Event	Heat		Semifinal		Final	
Athlete	Event	Result	Rank	Result	Rank	Result	Rank
Gunta Latiševa-Čudare	400 metres	52.17 PB	30	did not advance			
Anita Kažemāka	Marathon	—N/a				2:45.54 SB	39

Field events

Athlete	Event	Qualification		Final	
Athlete	Event	Distance	Position	Distance	Position
Aiga Grabuste	Long jump	6.48	20	did not advance	
Madara Palameika	Javelin throw	62.17	13	did not advance	
Sinta Ozoliņa-Kovala	Javelin throw	62.81 SB	11 q	62.20	7

Combined events – Heptathlon

Athlete	Event	100H	HJ	SP	200 m	LJ	JT	800 m	Final	Rank
Laura Ikauniece-Admidiņa	Result	13.21(+0.6 m/s) PB	1.77m	12.71m	23.97(+0.8 m/s)	6.32m (+0.9 m/s) PB	53.67m SB	2:13.79	6516 NR	(bronze)
Laura Ikauniece-Admidiņa	Points	1093	941	708	984	949	931	910	6516 NR	(bronze)
