= Athletics at the 2024 Summer Olympics – Women's javelin throw =

Women's javelin throw at the Games of the XXXIII Olympiad
- Venue: Stade de France, Paris, France
- Date: 7 August 2024 (qualification) 10 August 2024 (final)
- Winning distance: 65.80 m

Medalists
1st place, gold medalist(s)		Haruka Kitaguchi	Japan
2nd place, silver medalist(s)		Jo-Ané van Dyk	South Africa
3rd place, bronze medalist(s)		Nikola Ogrodníková	Czech Republic

The women's javelin throw at the 2024 Summer Olympics was held in Paris, France, on 7 and 10 August 2024. This was the 22nd time that the event was contested at the Summer Olympics.

== Summary ==
Liu Shiying did not return to defend her title, silver medalist Maria Andrejczyk and bronze Kelsey-Lee Barber were back, as was 2016 Gold Medalist Sara Kolak. Barber won the 2019 and 2022 World Championships. Lü Huihui won silver back in 2015 and had two bronzes from 2017 and 2019. Haruka Kitaguchi won the 2023 World Championships on the last throw to beat Flor Ruiz and bronze medalist Mackenzie Little. Ruiz is the seasonal World Leader from the 2024 Ibero-American Championships in Athletics back in May.

In the qualification round there were eight automatic qualifiers over 62 metres. Andrejczyk, Ruiz, Jo-Ané van Dyk and Kitaguchi got it on their first attempt. It took 61.08m to get the small q, eliminating Lü and Barber.

Andrejczyk started the action off with 62.44m. After three other throwers, Kitaguchi got off a good one, 65.80 m (215 ft 10 in). Five throwers later Kathryn Mitchell moved into second place with 62.63m. Near the end of the first round, Yulenmis Aguilar advanced ahead of her with a 62.78m. In the second round, Ruiz took over second position throwing 63 metres exactly. Then in the third round, van Dyk went from 10th place, in danger of not getting her final attempts, to second position with a 63.93m. Two throws later, Sara Kolak was in 11th place, then threw 63.40m to grab onto the podium. Kolak would hold that spot for five more throwers, then Nikola Ogrodníková leapfrogged from dead last to bronze with 63.68m. Those extra three attempts did not prove to be significant, nobody was able to improve, though Kitaguchi did back up her winning first round throw with a 64.73m.

== Background ==
The women's javelin throw has been present on the Olympic athletics programme since 1932.

Global records before the 2024 Summer Olympics
Record	Athlete (Nation)	Distance (m)	Location	Date
World record	Barbora Špotáková (CZE)	72.28	Stuttgart, Germany	13 September 2008
Olympic record	Osleidys Menéndez (CUB)	71.53	Athens, Greece	27 August 2004
World leading	Flor Ruiz (COL)	66.70	Cuiabá, Brazil	12 May 2024

Area records before the 2024 Summer Olympics
Area Record	Athlete (Nation)	Distance (m)
Africa (records)	Sunette Viljoen (RSA)	69.35
Asia (records)	Lü Huihui (CHN)	67.98
Europe (records)	Barbora Špotáková (CZE)	72.28 WR
North, Central America and Caribbean (records)	Osleidys Menéndez (CUB)	71.70
Oceania (records)	Kathryn Mitchell (AUS)	68.92
South America (records)	Flor Ruiz (COL)	66.70

== Qualification ==
For the women's javelin throw event, the qualification period is between 1 July 2023 and 30 June 2024. 32 athletes are able to qualify for the event, with a maximum of three athletes per nation, by throwing the entry standard of 64.00 m or further or by their World Athletics Ranking for this event.

== Results ==
=== Qualification ===
The qualification was held on 7 August, starting at 10:25 (UTC+2) for Group A and 11:50 (UTC+2) for Group B in the morning. 32 athletes qualified for the first round by qualification time or world ranking.

Qualification Rules: Qualifying performance 62 (Q) or at least 12 best performers (q) advance to the Final

Rank	Group	Athlete	Nation	1	2	3	Distance	Notes
1	B	Maria Andrejczyk	Poland	65.52	—	—	65.52	Q, SB
2	B	Sara Kolak	Croatia	54.04	64.57	—	64.57	Q, SB
3	B	Flor Ruiz	Colombia	64.40	—	—	64.40	Q
4	A	Jo-Ane van Dyk	South Africa	64.22	—	—	64.22	Q, PB
5	B	Elina Tzengko	Greece	52.02	61.09	63.22	63.22	Q, SB
6	A	Mackenzie Little	Australia	59.59	62.82	—	62.82	Q
7	B	Haruka Kitaguchi	Japan	62.58	—	—	62.58	Q
8	A	Kathryn Mitchell	Australia	58.71	62.40	—	62.40	Q, SB
9	B	Yulenmis Aguilar	Spain	61.95	58.35	59.92	61.95	q
10	B	Marie-Therese Obst	Norway	61.82	x	55.40	61.82	q
11	A	Nikola Ogrodníková	Czech Republic	x	59.12	61.16	61.16	q
12	B	Momone Ueda	Japan	56.77	61.08	56.87	61.08	q
13	B	Adriana Vilagoš	Serbia	60.49	60.17	49.41	60.49	
14	B	Petra Sičaková	Czech Republic	60.47	59.68	59.44	60.47	
15	B	Anete Sietiņa	Latvia	56.73	59.46	60.47	60.47	
16	A	María Lucelly Murillo	Colombia	60.38	56.28	x	60.38	SB
17	A	Līna Mūze	Latvia	60.30	x	x	60.30	
18	A	Christin Hussong	Germany	57.00	56.84	59.99	59.99	
19	A	Tori Peeters	New Zealand	54.81	56.60	59.78	59.78	
20	A	Victoria Hudson	Austria	59.69	x	x	59.69	
21	A	Marina Saito	Japan	59.42	x	57.66	59.42	
22	B	Lü Huihui	China	58.52	55.38	59.37	59.37	
23	A	Dai Qianqian	China	55.56	56.18	59.33	59.33	
24	A	Maggie Malone-Hardin	United States	58.76	56.82	58.12	58.76	
25	B	Liveta Jasiūnaitė	Lithuania	58.35	x	x	58.35	
26	B	Kelsey-Lee Barber	Australia	56.32	57.73	56.56	57.73	SB
27	A	Rhema Otabor	Bahamas	x	54.76	57.67	57.67	
28	A	Jucilene de Lima	Brazil	x	x	57.56	57.56	
29	A	Annu Rani	India	55.81	53.22	53.55	55.81	
30	B	Anni-Linnea Alanen	Finland	55.30	54.53	x	55.30	
31	B	Eda Tuğsuz	Turkey	51.33	x	55.30	55.30	
32	A	Dilhani Lekamge	Sri Lanka	53.66	x	53.24	53.66	

=== Final ===
The final was held on 10 August, starting at 19:40 (UTC+2) in the evening.

Rank	Athlete	Nation	#1	#2	#3	#4	#5	#6	Distance	Notes
1st place, gold medalist(s)	Haruka Kitaguchi	Japan	65.80	62.39	X	61.68	64.73	X	65.80	SB
2nd place, silver medalist(s)	Jo-Ane van Dyk	South Africa	59.72	61.72	63.93	X	62.07	57.07	63.93	
3rd place, bronze medalist(s)	Nikola Ogrodníková	Czech Republic	58.13	X	63.68	58.34	61.45	58.04	63.68	SB
4	Sara Kolak	Croatia	57.86	58.85	63.40	58.43	62.31	63.03	63.40	
5	Flor Ruiz	Colombia	60.49	63.00	62.41	61.68	60.14	61.35	63.00	
6	Yulenmis Aguilar	Spain	62.78	X	60.17	—	61.58	X	62.78	
7	Kathryn Mitchell	Australia	62.63	59.57	60.31	62.16	X	X	62.63	SB
8	Maria Andrejczyk	Poland	62.44	60.52	X	X	X	57.74	62.44	
9	Elina Tzengko	Greece	61.85	X	57.90	did not advance			61.85	
10	Momone Ueda	Japan	59.57	61.64	59.79	did not advance			61.64	SB
11	Marie-Therese Obst	Norway	61.14	60.57	58.78	did not advance			61.14	
12	Mackenzie Little	Australia	60.32	56.94	59.41	did not advance			60.32	
