= Latvia at the 2022 World Athletics Championships =

- Flag of Latvia
- WA code: LAT

in Eugene, United States 15 July 2022 – 24 July 2022
- Competitors: 6 (3 men and 3 women)
- Medals: Gold 0 Silver 0 Bronze 0 Total 0

World Athletics Championships appearances (overview)
- 1993; 1995; 1997; 1999; 2001; 2003; 2005; 2007; 2009; 2011; 2013; 2015; 2017; 2019; 2022; 2023; 2025

Latvia competed at the 2022 World Athletics Championships in Eugene, United States, from 15 to 24 July 2022.

== Results ==
Latvia entered 6 athletes.

Key

- Q = Qualified for the next round
- q = Qualified for the next round as a fastest loser or, in field events, by position without achieving the qualifying target
- NR = National record
- PB = Personal best
- SB = Season best
- N/A = Round not applicable for the event

=== Men ===
Track and road events

Athlete	Event	Heat		Semi-final		Final	
Athlete	Event	Result	Rank	Result	Rank	Result	Rank
Arnis Rumbenieks	35 km walk	—N/a				2:42:47	37

Field events

Athlete	Event	Qualification		Final	
Athlete	Event	Distance	Position	Distance	Position
Patriks Gailums	Javelin throw	79.66	13	Did not advance	
Rolands Štrobinders	Javelin throw	79.39	15	Did not advance	

=== Women ===
Track and road events

Athlete	Event	Heat		Semi-final		Final	
Athlete	Event	Result	Rank	Result	Rank	Result	Rank
Gunta Vaičule	400 m	52.21	4	Did not advance			

Field events

Athlete	Event	Qualification		Final	
Athlete	Event	Distance	Position	Distance	Position
Līna Mūze	Javelin throw	59.16	10 q	61.26	6
Madara Palameika	Javelin throw	58.61 SB	13	Did not advance	
