= Athletics at the 2026 Asian Games – Women's javelin throw =

Women's javelin throw at the 2026 Asian Games
- Venue: Mizuho Park Athletic Stadium, Nagoya
- Date: 27 September 2026

Medalists
gold medal	Yan Ziyi	China
silver medal	Haruka Kitaguchi	Japan
bronze medal	Sae Takemoto	Japan

The women's javelin throw competition at the 2026 Asian Games took place on 27 September 2026 at the Mizuho Park Athletic Stadium in Nagoya, Japan. Yan Ziyi of China won the gold medal, while Haruka Kitaguchi and Sae Takemoto of Japan won the silver and bronze medals respectively.

== Schedule ==
All times are Japan Standard Time (UTC+09:00)

Schedule
Date	Time	Event
Sunday, 27 September 2026	21:03	Final

== Records ==
Prior to this competition, the existing world, Asian and Games records were as follows.

World Record	Barbora Špotáková (CZE)	72.28	Stuttgart, Germany	13 September 2008
Asian Record	Yan Ziyi (CHN)	71.74	Xiamen, China	22 May 2026
Games Record	Liu Shiying (CHN)	66.09	Jakarta, Indonesia	2 August 2018

== Results ==
Rank	Athlete	Attempt						Result	Notes
Rank	Athlete	1	2	3	4	5	6	Result	Notes
1st place, gold medalist(s)	Yan Ziyi (CHN)	70.46	-	-	-	-	-	70.46	GR
2nd place, silver medalist(s)	Haruka Kitaguchi (JPN)	56.48	57.16	X	61.89	61.54	62.70	62.70	
3rd place, bronze medalist(s)	Sae Takemoto (JPN)	56.20	56.85	58.00	54.32	52.16	62.15	62.15	SB
4	Nargizakhon Kuchkarova (UZB)	56.81	53.41	57.04	57.40	60.97	60.53	60.97	PB
5	Dilhani Lekamge (SRI)	51.76	X	59.27	55.66	53.05	56.75	59.27	
6	Dai Qianqian (CHN)	57.86	57.06	57.24	58.56	X	55.81	58.56	
7	Chu Pin-hsun (TPE)	52.21	52.06	55.43	56.01	X	54.25	56.01	
8	Li Hui-jun (TPE)	55.68	51.75	54.75	X	52.89	X	55.68	
