= Serbia at the 2025 World Athletics Championships =

- Flag of Serbia
- WA code: SRB

in Tokyo, Japan 13 September 2025 – 21 September 2025
- Competitors: 6 (1 man and 5 women)
- Medals Ranked 41st: Gold 0 Silver 0 Bronze 1 Total 1

World Athletics Championships appearances
- 2007; 2009; 2011; 2013; 2015; 2017; 2019; 2022; 2023; 2025

Other related appearances
- Yugoslavia (1983–1991); Serbia and Montenegro (1998–2005)

Serbia competed at the 2025 World Athletics Championships in Tokyo, Japan, from 13 to 21 September 2025.

The nation's only medal came on the final day of competition, when Angelina Topić tied for bronze in the high jump with Yaroslava Mahuchikh of Ukraine. Adriana Vilagoš, who had finished second in the Diamond League final the previous month, threw the furthest distance in the qualifiers for the javelin throw, however only finished in eighth place in the final.

== Medalists ==
Medal	Athlete	Event	Date
Bronze	Angelina Topić	Women's high jump	September 21

== Results ==
Serbia entered 6 athletes to the championships: 5 women and 1 man.

Key

- Q = Qualified for the next round
- q = Qualified for the next round as a fastest loser or, in field events, by position without achieving the qualifying target
- NR = National record
- PB = Personal best
- SB = Season best
- N/A = Round not applicable for the event

=== Men ===
Field events

Athlete	Event	Qualification		Final	
Athlete	Event	Distance	Position	Distance	Position
Armin Sinančević	Shot put	20.18	16	Did not advance	

=== Women ===
Field events

Athlete	Event	Qualification		Final	
Athlete	Event	Distance	Position	Distance	Position
Angelina Topić	High jump	1.92	1 q	1.97 SB	3rd place, bronze medalist(s)
Milica Gardašević	Long jump	6.41	21	Did not advance	
Ivana Španović	Triple jump	13.82	16	Did not advance	
Adriana Vilagoš	Javelin throw	66.06	1 Q	61.29	8
Marija Vučenović	Javelin throw	58.4	21	Did not advance	
