= Latvia at the 2013 World Championships in Athletics =

- WA code: LAT
- National federation: Latvian Athletics Association
- Website: lat-athletics.lv

in Moscow
- Competitors: 10
- Medals: Gold 0 Silver 0 Bronze 0 Total 0

World Championships in Athletics appearances
- 1993; 1995; 1997; 1999; 2001; 2003; 2005; 2007; 2009; 2011; 2013; 2015; 2017; 2019; 2022; 2023

Latvia competed at the 2013 World Championships in Athletics in Moscow, Russia, from 10–18 August 2013.

== Athletes ==
10 athletes from Latvia will participate: Laura Ikauniece (Heptathlon), Madara Palameika, Līna Mūze, Vadims Vasiļevskis (all - Javelin throw), Lauma Grīva (Long jump), Igors Sokolovs (Hammer throw), Mareks Ārents (Pole vault), Agnese Pastare, Anita Kažemāka, and Arnis Rumbenieks (all - Walking).
