= Athletics at the 2022 Commonwealth Games – Women's javelin throw =

Women's javelin throw at the 2022 Commonwealth Games
- Venue: Alexander Stadium
- Dates: 7 August
- Competitors: 8 from 6 nations
- Winning distance: 64.43

Medalists
gold medal	Kelsey-Lee Barber	Australia
silver medal	Mackenzie Little	Australia
bronze medal	Annu Rani	India

The women's javelin throw at the 2022 Commonwealth Games, as part of the athletics programme, took place in the Alexander Stadium on 7 August 2022.

== Records ==
Prior to this competition, the existing world and Games records were as follows:

World record	Barbora Špotáková (CZE)	72.28 m	Stuttgart, Germany	13 September 2008
Commonwealth record	Sunette Viljoen (RSA)	69.35 m	New York City, United States	9 June 2012
Games record	Kathryn Mitchell (AUS)	68.92 m	Gold Coast, Australia	11 April 2018

== Schedule ==
The schedule was as follows:

Date	Time	Round
Sunday 7 August 2022	11:35	Final

All times are British Summer Time (UTC+1)

== Results ==
=== Final ===
The medals were determined in the final.

Rank	Name	#1	#2	#3	#4	#5	#6	Result	Notes
1st place, gold medalist(s)	Kelsey-Lee Barber (AUS)	63.52	51.94	61.57	58.46	60.24	64.43	64.43	
2nd place, silver medalist(s)	Mackenzie Little (AUS)	64.03	62.85	56.12	61.37	64.27	61.17	64.27	PB
3rd place, bronze medalist(s)	Annu Rani (IND)	55.61	x	x	60.00	58.15	x	60.00	
4	Elizabeth Gleadle (CAN)	56.34	x	59.79	x	58.58	x	59.79	
5	Tori Peeters (NZL)	57.86	52.86	x	54.18	x	x	57.86	
6	Jo-Ane van Dyk (RSA)	54.87	57.12	x	53.47	53.59	x	57.12	
7	Shilpa Rani (IND)	54.22	54.62	50.98	54.13	53.94	x	54.62	
8	Sharon Toako (PNG)	38.33	x	36.42	39.34	37.92	36.43	39.34	
