= Latvia at the 2023 World Athletics Championships =

- Flag of Latvia
- WA code: LAT

in Budapest, Hungary 19 August 2023 – 27 August 2023
- Competitors: 9 (4 men and 5 women)
- Medals: Gold 0 Silver 0 Bronze 0 Total 0

World Athletics Championships appearances
- 1993; 1995; 1997; 1999; 2001; 2003; 2005; 2007; 2009; 2011; 2013; 2015; 2017; 2019; 2022; 2023

Latvia competed at the 2023 World Athletics Championships in Budapest, Hungary, from 19 to 27 August 2023.

== Results ==
Latvia entered 9 athletes.

Key

- Q = Qualified for the next round
- q = Qualified for the next round as a fastest loser or, in field events, by position without achieving the qualifying target
- NR = National record
- PB = Personal best
- SB = Season best
- N/A = Round not applicable for the event

=== Men ===
Track and road events

Athlete	Event	Final	
Athlete	Event	Result	Rank
Arnis Rumbenieks	35 kilometres walk	2:43:36	32

Field events

Athlete	Event	Qualification		Final	
Athlete	Event	Distance	Position	Distance	Position
Gatis Čakšs	Javelin throw	73.42	33	Did not advance	
Patriks Gailums	Javelin throw	77.43	21	Did not advance	
Rolands Štrobinders	Javelin throw	74.46	29	Did not advance	

=== Women ===
Track and road events

Athlete	Event	Heat		Semifinal		Final	
Athlete	Event	Result	Rank	Result	Rank	Result	Rank
Gunta Vaičule	400 metres	51.36 SB	5	Did not advance			
Agate Caune	5000 metres	15:00.48 PB	4 Q	—		WD	

Field events

Athlete	Event	Qualification		Final	
Athlete	Event	Distance	Position	Distance	Position
Rūta Kate Lasmane	Triple jump	13.87	19	Did not advance	
Anete Kociņa	Javelin throw	61.27	8 q	63.18 SB	4
Līna Mūze	Javelin throw	63.50	1 Q	58.43	9
