= Kelsey-Lee Barber =

Australian javelin thrower (born 1991)

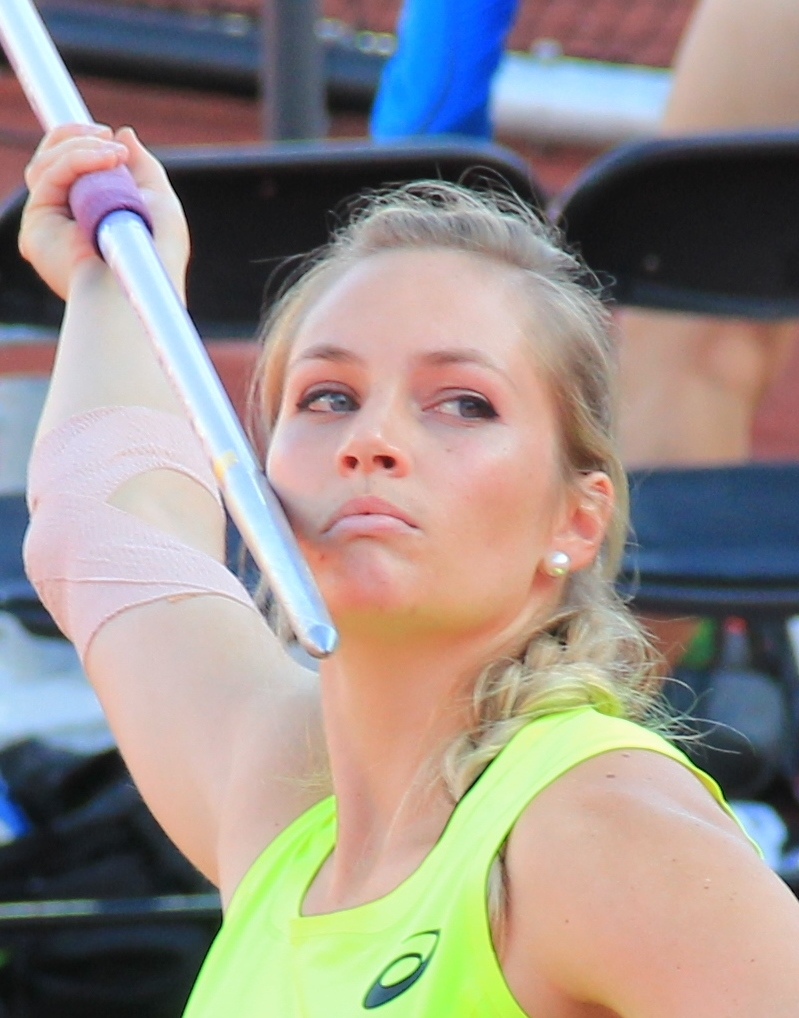
- Barber in Busto Arsizio in 2017

Personal information
- Nationality: Australian
- Born: Kelsey-Lee Roberts; 20 September 1991 (age 35) East London, South Africa
- Height: 1.75 m (5 ft 9 in)
- Weight: 72 kg (159 lb)

Sport
- Country: Australia
- Sport: Athletics
- Event: Javelin throw
- Coached by: Mike Barber

Achievements and titles
- Personal best: 67.70 m (2019)
Medal record
Women's athletics
Representing Australia
Olympic Games
Bronze medal – third place	2020 Tokyo	Javelin throw
World Championships
Gold medal – first place	2022 Eugene	Javelin throw
Gold medal – first place	2019 Doha	Javelin throw
Commonwealth Games
Gold medal – first place	2022 Birmingham	Javelin throw
Silver medal – second place	2018 Gold Coast	Javelin throw
Bronze medal – third place	2014 Glasgow	Javelin throw

Kelsey-Lee Barber (née Roberts; born 20 September 1991) is an Australian track and field athlete who competes in the javelin throw. She won consecutive gold medals at the 2019 World Championships and 2022 World Championships, the first person to do so, and her personal best of 67.70 m ranks her 13th in the overall list.

Barber is based at the Queensland Academy of Sport in Brisbane. She was formerly based at the Australian Institute of Sport in Canberra.

== Personal life ==
Born in East London, South Africa, Barber's family moved to Australia in 2000. It was this relocation that setup the career of Barber.

Barber arrived in Australia during the Sydney Olympics and lived in Corryong in Victoria. Her uncle and aunt owned a dairy farm and she competed in athletics at the school carnival. She was so successful that she progressed in discus competitions through the zone and regional carnivals. She moved from Corryong to Canberra in 2007 and started taking athletics more seriously. She trained with a coach and at age 17 won the javelin at the Pacific School Games in Canberra.

She married her coach Mike Barber after the 2018 Commonwealth Games.

== Career ==
Barber made her international debut at the 2014 Commonwealth Games, finishing third with 62.95 m. She competed at the 2015 World Championships in Beijing without qualifying for the final. A back injury in early 2016 disrupted her preparation for the 2016 Summer Olympics and she finished 28th in qualifying.

Barber had a breakthrough season in 2017. She produced three consecutive personal bests in competitions in Turku, Lausanne and London. At the World Championships, she qualified automatically for the final and finished 10th. She finished the season with a silver medal at the Diamond League Final in Zurich and another personal best of 64.53 m.

In 2018, she placed second at the national titles behind Kathryn Mitchell. Barber threw a new personal best of 64.57 m at the Queensland International Track Classic in Brisbane on 28 March. In the 2018 Commonwealth Games Barber received a silver medal with a 63.89 m throw.

Barber won gold at the 2019 Oceania Athletics Championships with a personal best and championship record 65.61 m throw. At the Spitzen Leichtathletik Luzern in July, she won gold and improved on her personal best, throwing 67.70 m. This also moved Barber to second on the Oceanian list behind Mitchell, and into 12th in the overall list. She won the gold medal at the 2019 World Championships with 66.56 m on the final throw, moving her from 4th to 1st place. She was recognised in the Canberra Sport Awards as Female Athlete of the Year.

In 2021, following the COVID-19 disruptions to competition, Barber threw 61.09 m to place second at the national titles.

Barber won bronze in the final at the 2020 Summer Olympics in Tokyo, throwing 64.56m.

At the 2022 World Athletics Championships, Barber won a gold medal in javelin, making her the first woman to ever retain the women's World Championships javelin title. Later that year, she also won a gold medal at the 2022 Commonwealth Games with a throw of 64.43m.

== Competition record ==
Year	Competition	Venue	Position	Event	Notes
Representing Australia
2014	Commonwealth Games	Glasgow, United Kingdom	3rd	Javelin throw	62.95 m
2015	World Championships	Beijing, China	20th (q)	Javelin throw	60.18 m
2016	Olympic Games	Rio de Janeiro, Brazil	28th (q)	Javelin throw	55.25 m
2017	World Championships	London, United Kingdom	10th	Javelin throw	60.76 m
2018	Commonwealth Games	Gold Coast, Australia	2nd	Javelin throw	63.89 m
2019	World Championships	Doha, Qatar	1st	Javelin throw	66.56 m
2021	Olympic Games	Tokyo, Japan	3rd	Javelin throw	64.56 m
2022	World Championships	Eugene, United States	1st	Javelin throw	66.91 m
2022	Commonwealth Games	Birmingham, United Kingdom	1st	Javelin throw	64.43 m
2023	World Championships	Budapest, Hungary	7th	Javelin throw	61.19 m
2024	Olympic Games	Paris, France	26th (q)	Javelin throw	57.73 m

== Seasonal bests by year ==
View source data.
