= Yan Ziyi =

Chinese javelin thrower (born 2008)

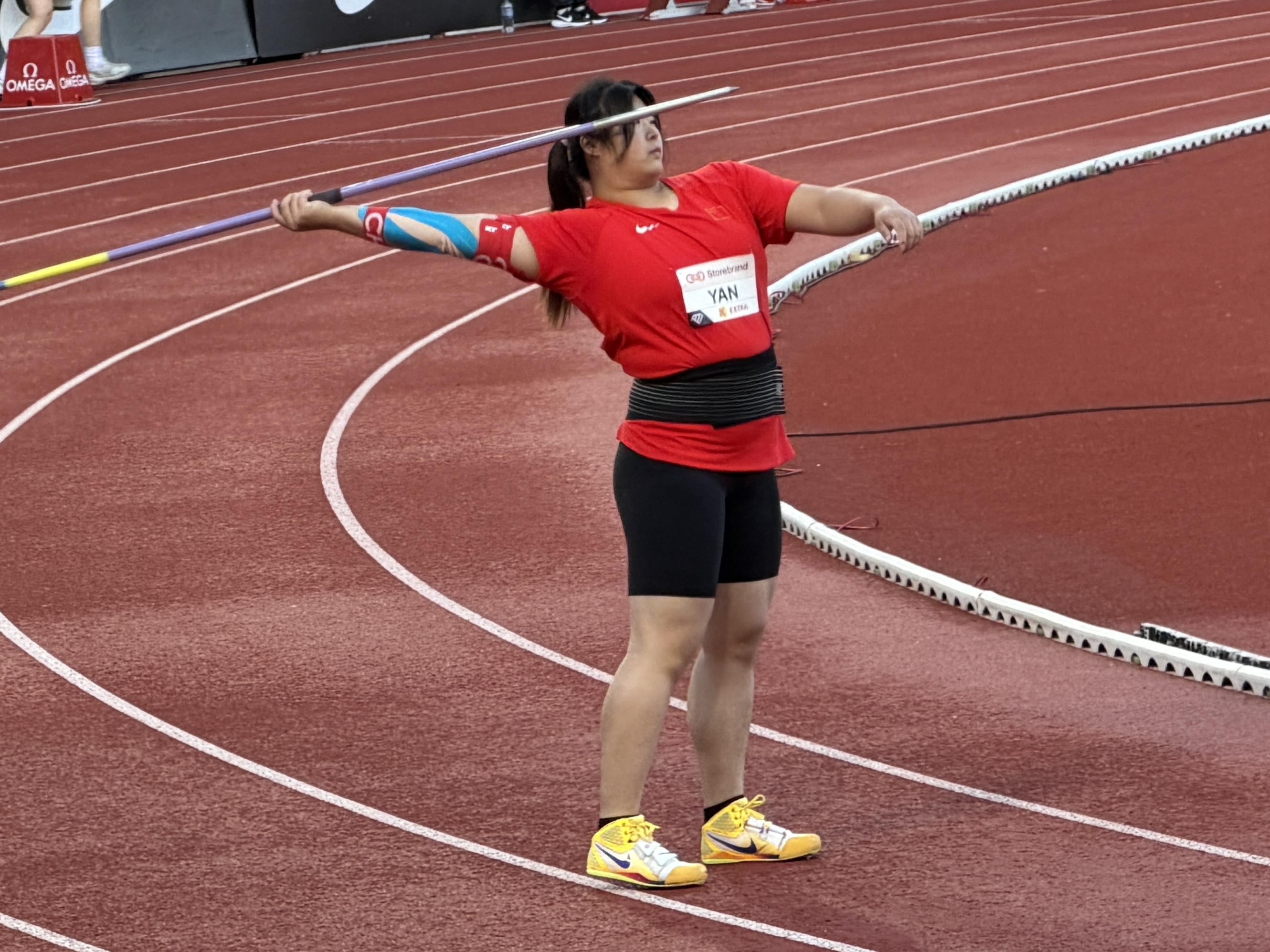
- Yan at the 2026 Bislett Games

Personal information
- Nationality: Chinese
- Born: 22 May 2008 (age 18) Ningbo, China

Sport
- Sport: Track and Field
- Event: Javelin throw

Achievements and titles
- Personal bests: Javelin: 71.74m m (Xiamen, 2026) WU20R
Medal record
Women's athletics
Representing China
World Ultimate Championship
Second place	2026 Budapest	Javelin throw
Diamond League
First place	2026 Brussels	Javelin throw
Asian Games
Gold medal – first place	2026 Aichi–Nagoya	Javelin throw
World U20 Championships
Gold medal – first place	2024 Lima	Javelin throw

Yan Ziyi (Chinese: 严子怡; pinyin: Yán Zǐyí; born 22 May 2008) is a Chinese track and field athlete who specializes in javelin throw. In 2026, she set a world under-20 record and Asian record of 71.74 metres, the second-best mark in history. She later won the 2026 Diamond League Final. She previously won the gold medal at the 2024 World U20 Championships.

== Biography ==
Yan began surpassing 60m regularly in 2024, winning her country's women's javelin title in March 2024 in Tianjin with a throw of 61.31 meters. She threw past 60m in four of her five competitions in 2024 and set a personal best mark of 62.23m in Chengdu in April 2024. Later that month, she set a under-20 world record for the javelin with a throw of 64.28m to win at the China Athletics GP, breaking Yulenmis Aguilar mark of 63.86m from 2015.The throw also beat the unratified mark of 63.96m achieved by Greek Elina Tzengko in 2020. However, Yan was not allowed to compete in the 2024 Olympics due to the age limit set by World Athletics. On 30 August 2024, Yan won the gold medal at the 2024 World Athletics U20 Championships in Lima, Peru.

She broke the under-20 world record for a third time when she threw 64.83 metres in Chengdu in March 2025. She threw 60.54 metres to place fifth at the 2025 Shanghai Diamond League event in China on 3 May 2025. In August, she won the Chinese Athletics Championships with a throw of 65.89 metres, breaking the world under-20 record for a fourth time, despite competing with an ankle injury. As with the Olympic Games the previous year, she was not permitted to compete at the 2025 World Athletics Championships due to her young age and despite being a favorite for the world title. In November, she was nominated for the World Athletics Women's Rising Star Award.

On 23 May 2026, she set a new world under-20 record and Asian record of 71.74 metres at the 2026 Xiamen Diamond League, to move to second on the world all-time list. Her world under-20 record was ratified by World Athletics on 23 July 2026.

On 10 June, she won in the Diamond League again with an opening throw of 67.11 metres at the 2026 Bislett Games in Oslo, her first Diamond League event outside China. On 28 June, Ziyi threw 67.44m in the first round to win the 2026 Meeting de Paris. On 10 July, she won with 68.75m in the final round at the 2026 Herculis Diamond League event in Monaco. At the 2026 Diamond League Final in Brussels on 5 September, she threw 68.42m to win the title ahead of Haruka Kitaguchi of Japan. She placed second to Kitaguchi at the World Ultimate Championship in Budapest. Having led with 68.05m she had to retire from the competition after her second attempt, but the opening throw remained enough for second place overall.

On 27 September, Yan won the gold medal in the javelin throw at the 2026 Asian Games with a throw of 70.46m, beating Kitaguchi by almost 8 metres.
