= Latvia at the 2019 World Athletics Championships =

- WA code: LAT

in Doha, Qatar
- Competitors: 12 (5 men and 7 women) in 7 events
- Medals: Gold 0 Silver 0 Bronze 0 Total 0

World Athletics Championships appearances
- 1993; 1995; 1997; 1999; 2001; 2003; 2005; 2007; 2009; 2011; 2013; 2015; 2017; 2019; 2022; 2023

Latvia competed at the 2019 World Championships in Athletics in Doha, Qatar from 27 September to 6 October 2019.

== Results ==
(q – qualified, NM – no mark, SB – season best)

=== Men ===
Track and road events

Athlete	Event	Heat		Semifinal		Final	
Athlete	Event	Result	Rank	Result	Rank	Result	Rank
Dmitrijs Serjogins	Marathon	—				2:24:00 PB	48
Arnis Rumbenieks	50 km walk	—				4:28:18	21
Ruslans Smolonskis	50 km walk	—				DQ	

Field events

Athlete	Event	Qualification		Final	
Athlete	Event	Result	Rank	Result	Rank
Rolands Štrobinders	Javelin throw	81.09	17	did not advance	
Gatis Čakšs	Javelin throw	79.94	21	did not advance	

=== Women ===
Track and road events

Athlete	Event	Heat		Semifinal		Final	
Athlete	Event	Result	Rank	Result	Rank	Result	Rank
Gunta Vaičule	200 m	23.32	30	did not advance			
Sindija Bukša	200 m	23.53	36	did not advance			
Līga Velvere	800 m	2:02.93	18 q	2:06.99	23	did not advance	

Field events

Athlete	Event	Qualification		Final	
Athlete	Event	Result	Rank	Result	Rank
Laura Igaune	Hammer throw	67.77	22	did not advance	
Madara Palameika	Javelin throw	59.95	18	did not advance	
Anete Kociņa	Javelin throw	56.70	24	did not advance	
Līna Mūze	Javelin throw	55.66	27	did not advance	
