= 2021 Baltic States Athletics Championships =

Baltic athletics championships

- Host city: Ogre, Latvia
- Date: August 13 – 14
- Nations: 3
- Events: 40

The 2021 Baltic States Athletics Championships was held in Ogre, Latvia, between August 13 and August 14.

All participating countries were eligible to delegate two participants per each event.

== Medal table ==
Host nation (Lithuania)

Rank	Nation	Gold	Silver	Bronze	Total
1	Lithuania (LTU)	15	10	12	37
2	Estonia (EST)	13	17	19	49
3	Latvia (LAT)*	12	13	11	36
Totals (3 entries)		40	40	42	122

== Results ==
=== Men's events ===
Event	Gold		Silver		Bronze	
100 m	Karl Erik Nazarov (EST)	10.47	Gediminas Truskauskas (LTU)	10.56	Roberts Jānis Zālītis (LAT)	10.65
200 m	Gediminas Truskauskas (LTU)	21.01	Roberts Jānis Zālītis (LAT)	21.55	Ken Mark Minkovski (EST)	21.59
400 m	Austris Karpinskis (LAT)	47.87	Rivar Tipp (EST)	48.30	Dariuš Križanovskij (LTU)	48.60
800 m	Simas Bertašius (LTU)	1:48.48 PB	Deniss Šalkauskas (EST)	1:49.92	Austris Karpinskis (LAT)	1:51.02
1500 m	Simas Bertašius (LTU)	3:51.39	Deniss Salmijanov (EST)	3:55.95	Edgars Šumskis (LAT)	3:57.25
5000 m	Uģis Jocis (LAT)	14:30.40	Dmitrijs Serjogins (LAT)	14:32.42	Leonid Latsepov (EST)	14:39.85
3000 m Steeplechase	Kaur Kivistik (EST)	8:57.70	Edgars Šumskis (LAT)	9:02.10	Artūrs Niklāvs Medveds (LAT)	9:04.35
4 × 100 m Relay	Estonia; Lukas Lessel; Karl Robert Saluri; Ken Mark Minkovski; Karl Erik Nazarov	39.92	Latvia; Valērijs Valinščikovs; Roberts Jānis Zālītis; Oskars Grava; Artūrs Pastors	40.33	Lithuania; Adas Dambrauskas; Giedrius Rupeika; Kostas Skrabulis; Gediminas Truskauskas	41.28
4 × 400 m Relay	Lithuania; Einius Trumpa; Daniel Golovacki; Lukas Sutkus; Dariuš Križanovskij	3:13.44 SB	Latvia; Valērijs Valinščikovs; Austris Karpinskis; Aleks Kožuškevičs; Jānis Leitis	3:13.65	Estonia; Kristjan Rosenberg; Sten Ander Sepp; Robin Sapar; Rasmus Kisel	3:13.76
110 m Hurdles	Rapolas Saulius (LTU)	14.05	Keiso Pedriks (EST)	14.15	Martin Täht (EST)	14.41
400 m Hurdles	Dmitrijs Ļašenko (LAT)	52.30	Rapolas Saulius (LTU)	52.48	Sten Ander Sepp (EST)	52.55
Long Jump	Jānis Leitis (LAT)	7.69	Tomas Lotužis (LTU)	7.45 =SB	Henrik Kutberg (EST)	7.40
Triple Jump	Paulius Svarauskas (LTU)	15.40	Viktor Morozov (EST)	15.30	Edvīns Hadakovs (LAT)	15.16
High Jump	Karl Lumi (EST)	2.10	Edvarts Eglītis (LAT)	2.07	Hendrik Lillemets (EST); Augustas Bukauskas (LTU)	2.04
Pole Vault	Mareks Ārents (LAT)	5.50	Jurijs Avsiščers (LAT)	5.05	Risto Lillemets (EST)	4.95
Shot Put	Jander Heil (EST)	18.54	Šarūnas Banevičius (LTU)	16.78	Kevin Sakson (EST)	16.57
Discus Throw	Martin Kupper (EST)	58.82	Armandas Miliauskas (LTU)	54.52	Kevin Sakson (EST)	49.19
Javelin Throw	Rolands Štrobinders (LAT)	77.59	Edis Matusevičius (LTU)	77.43	Gatis Čakšs (LAT)	75.96
Hammer Throw	Tomas Vasiliauskas (LTU)	69.82 SB	Adam Paul Kelly (EST)	66.27	Toomas Tankler (EST)	62.64
10000 m Walking	Arnis Rumbenieks (LAT)	41:06.12	Normunds Ivzāns (LAT)	43:48.44	Deimantas Kukis (LTU)	47:24.63

=== Women's events ===
Event	Gold		Silver		Bronze	
100 m	Akvilė Andriukaitytė (LTU)	11.90	Eva Misiūnaitė (LTU)	12.02	Kristin Saua (EST)	12.03
200 m	Akvilė Andriukaitytė (LTU)	23.80	Kristin Saua (EST)	24.12	Eva Misiūnaitė (LTU)	24.30
400 m	Asnāte Kalniņa (LAT)	54.02	Liis Roose (EST)	55.73	Ema Sarafinaitė (LTU)	56.62 PB
800 m	Kelly Nevolihhin (EST)	2:10.18	Helin Meier (EST)	2:10.74	Eglė Vaitulevičiūtė (LTU)	2:13.82
1500 m	Agate Caune (LAT)	4:29.37	Kelly Nevolihhin (EST)	4:33.98	Kamilla Vanadziņa (LAT)	4:35.31
5000 m	Jekaterina Patjuk (EST)	16:17.96	Vaida Žūsinaitė-Nekriošienė (LTU)	17:07.12	Elēna Miezava (LAT)	17:07.26
3000 m Steeplechase	Greta Karinauskaitė (LTU)	10:10.81	Laura Maasik (EST)	10:24.89	Tuuli Tomingas (EST)	10:36.59
4 × 100 m Relay	Latvia; Patrīcija Grosberga; Asnāte Kalniņa; Evija Šēfere; Līga Vecbērza	46.08	Estonia; Grit Šadeiko; Diana Suumann; Kristin Saua; Anna-Liisa Saks	46.42	Lithuania; Marija Fausta Rimkevičiūtė; Neda Lasickaitė; Eva Misiūnaitė; Akvilė Andriukaitytė	46.54 SB
4 × 400 m Relay	Estonia; Liis Roose; Helin Meier; Liis Grete Atonen; Marielle Kleemeier	3:46.33	Latvia; Evija Šēfere; Emmija Ivule; Katrīna Kamarūte; Asnāte Kalniņa	3:48.88	Lithuania; Kamilė Gargasaitė; Hanna Zikejeva; Viktorija Ivickyte; Ema Sarafinaitė	4:00.86
100 m Hurdles	Grit Šadeiko (EST)	13.41	Diana Suumann (EST)	13.61	Marta Marksa (LAT)	13.68
400 m Hurdles	Marielle Kleemeier (EST)	59.97	Kitija Zaula (LAT)	1:03.09	Kamilė Gargasaitė (LTU)	1:04.08
Long Jump	Jogailė Petrokaitė (LTU)	6.41	Tähti Alver (EST)	6.39	Aet Laurik (EST)	6.10
Triple Jump	Aina Grikšaitė (LTU)	13.78 SB	Māra Grīva (LAT)	13.04	Anna Panenko (EST)	12.76
High Jump	Lāsma Zemīte (LAT)	1.81	Urtė Baikštytė (LTU)	1.79	Edlin Lisbeth Laur (EST); Satera Balčaitytė (LTU)	1.76
Pole Vault	Marleen Mülla (EST)	3.80	Marin Lõo (EST)	3.75	Rugilė Miklyčiūtė (LTU)	3.70 NU16
Shot Put	Ieva Zarankaitė (LTU)	15.48	Kätlin Piirimäe (EST)	14.14	Lāsma Padedze (LAT)	14.08
Discus Throw	Zinaida Sendriūtė (LTU)	53.79	Ieva Zarankaitė (LTU)	53.31	Kätlin Tõllasson (EST)	48.35
Javelin Throw	Līna Mūze (LAT)	56.74	Laine Donāne (LAT)	49.70	Gerli Israel (EST)	48.95
Hammer Throw	Kati Ojaloo (EST)	67.43	Gertu Küttmann (EST)	55.49	Kristīne Strazdīte (LAT)	46.58
5000 m Walking	Brigita Virbalytė-Dimšienė (LTU)	22:18.28	Modra Ignate (LAT)	23:50.12	Maria Ivanova (EST)	27:12.00
