= Athletics at the 2026 Commonwealth Games – Women's javelin throw =

Women's javelin throw at the 2026 Commonwealth Games
- Venue: Scotstoun Stadium, Glasgow
- Dates: 1 August (final)
- Winning distance: 61.88

Medalists
gold medal	Mackenzie Little	Australia
silver medal	Tori Moorby	New Zealand
bronze medal	Irene Jepkemboi	Kenya

The women's javelin throw at the 2026 Commonwealth Games, as part of the athletics programme, took place in the Scotstoun Stadium on 1 August 2026. The event was a direct final.

== Records ==
Prior to this competition, the existing world, Commonwealth and Commonwealth Games records were as follows:

Women's Javelin throw
World record	72.28 m	Barbora Špotáková (CZE)	13 Sep 2008	Gottlieb-Daimler Stadion, Stuttgart
Commonwealth record	69.35 m	Sunette Viljoen (RSA)	9 Jun 2012	New York City, United States
Games record	68.92 m	Kathryn Mitchell (AUS)	11 April 2018	Gold Coast, Australia

== Schedule ==
The schedule is as follows:

Date	Time	Round
1 August 2026	19:00	Final

All times are British Summer Time (UTC+1)

== Results ==
=== Final ===
The standalone final was scheduled for the evening of 1 August.

Rank	Name	1	2	3	4	5	6	Result	Notes
1st place, gold medalist(s)	Mackenzie Little (AUS)	61.88	59.95	58.69	57.40	58.31	57.96	61.88	SB
2nd place, silver medalist(s)	Tori Moorby (NZL)	58.65	55.27	60.04	x	58.14	x	60.04	
3rd place, bronze medalist(s)	Irene Jepkemboi (KEN)	49.72	57.85	53.29	x	54.05	51.63	57.85	
4	Lianna Davidson (AUS)	55.67	57.26	x	55.85	57.61	55.54	57.61	
5	Rhema Otabor (BAH)	57.35	x	53.90	x	x	54.99	57.35	
6	Jo-Ané du Plessis (RSA)	56.19	x	55.60	56.22	55.76	55.02	56.22	
7	Dilhani Lekamge (SRI)	51.07	49.50	53.50	52.28	55.00	49.08	55.00	
8	Christiana Ellina (CYP)	49.38	x	49.12	47.93	x	46.16	49.38	
