= Latvia at the 2011 World Championships in Athletics =

- WA code: LAT
- National federation: Latvijas Vieglatlētikas savienība
- Website: lat-athletics.lv

in Daegu
- Competitors: 13
- Medals: Gold 0 Silver 0 Bronze 1 Total 1

World Championships in Athletics appearances
- 1993; 1995; 1997; 1999; 2001; 2003; 2005; 2007; 2009; 2011; 2013; 2015; 2017; 2019; 2022; 2023

Latvia competed at the 2011 World Championships in Athletics from August 27 to September 4 in Daegu, South Korea.

== Team selection ==
A team of 15 athletes was announced to represent the country in the event. The team is led by javelin thrower Vadims Vasiļevskis, the 2004 Olympic Games silver medalist and second this year’s world rankings with 88.22m, and 2010 European Athletics Championships long jump gold medalist Ineta Radēviča. Māris Urtāns and Edgars Eriņš were both qualified and appeared on the entry list, but they won't compete due to injuries.

The following athletes appeared on the preliminary Entry List, but not on the Official Start List of the specific event, resulting in a total number of 13 competitors:

KEY:	Did not participate	Competed in another event

	Event	Athlete
Men	Shot put	Māris Urtāns
Men	Decathlon	Edgars Eriņš

== Medalists ==
The following competitor from Latvia won a medal at the Championships

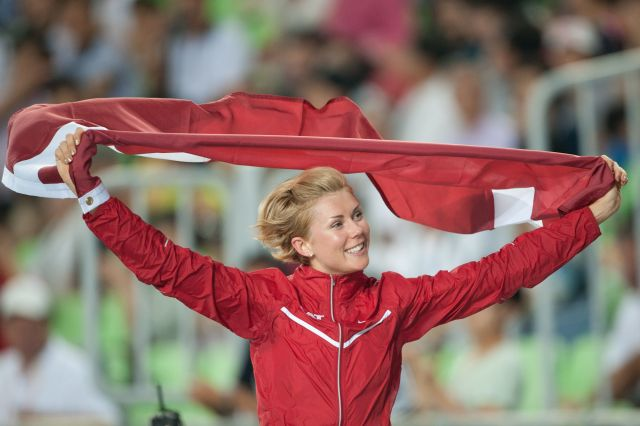
Ineta Radēviča celebrating her bronze medal at Daegu

Medal	Athlete	Event
Bronze	Ineta Radēviča	Long jump

== Results ==
=== Men ===
Athlete	Event	Preliminaries		Heats		Semifinals		Final	
Athlete	Event	Time Width Height	Rank	Time Width Height	Rank	Time Width Height	Rank	Time Width Height	Rank
Ronalds Arājs	100 metres			10.52	31	Did not advance			
Dmitrijs Jurkevičs	1500 metres			3:42.69	30	Did not advance			
Igors Kazakevičs	50 kilometres walk							DNF	
Igors Sokolovs	Hammer throw	72.95	20					Did not advance	
Ēriks Rags	Javelin throw	77.34	20					Did not advance	
Vadims Vasiļevskis	Javelin throw	75.23	25					Did not advance	
Zigismunds Sirmais	Javelin throw	73.16	32					Did not advance	

=== Women ===
Athlete	Event	Preliminaries		Heats		Semifinals		Final	
Athlete	Event	Time Width Height	Rank	Time Width Height	Rank	Time Width Height	Rank	Time Width Height	Rank
Agnese Pastare	20 kilometres walk							1:37:48	28
Ineta Radēviča	Long jump	6.59	9 q					6.76 (SB)	3rd place, bronze medalist(s)
Lauma Grīva	Long jump	6.27	23					Did not advance	
Madara Palameika	Javelin throw	59.78	11					58.08	11
Sinta Ozoliņa-Kovala	Javelin throw	58.15	18					Did not advance	

Heptathlon

Aiga Grabuste	Heptathlon			
Aiga Grabuste	Event	Results	Points	Rank
	100 m hurdles	14.06	970	25
	High jump	1.71	867	24
	Shot put	14.46 SB	825	10
	200 m	24.83	902	12
	Long jump	6.45	991	3
	Javelin throw	45.82	779	9
	800 m	2:14.82	895	12
Total			6229	12
