= Serbia at the 2022 World Athletics Championships =

- Flag of Serbia
- WA code: SRB
- National federation: Athletics Federation of Serbia
- Website: sas.org.rs

in Eugene, United States 15–24 July 2022
- Competitors: 3 (1 man and 2 women) in 2 events
- Medals: Gold 0 Silver 0 Bronze 0 Total 0

World Athletics Championships appearances
- 2007; 2009; 2011; 2013; 2015; 2017; 2019; 2022; 2023; 2025

Other related appearances
- Yugoslavia (1983–1991); Serbia and Montenegro (1998–2005)

Serbia competed at the 2022 World Athletics Championships in Eugene, Oregon from 15 to 24 July 2022. Serbia had entered 3 athletes.

== Results ==
Key

- Q = Qualified for the next round
- q = Not qualified for the next round as a fastest loser or, in field events, by position without achieving the qualifying target
- NR = National record
- PB = Personal best
- SB = Season best
- N/A = Round not applicable for the event

=== Men ===
Track and road events

Athlete	Event	Heat		Semi-final		Final	
Athlete	Event	Result	Rank	Result	Rank	Result	Rank
Boško Kijanović	400 metres	46.85	35	Did not advance			

=== Women ===
Field events

Athlete	Event	Qualification		Final	
Athlete	Event	Distance	Position	Distance	Position
Ivana Vuleta	Long jump	6.65	11 q	6.84	7
Milica Gardašević	Long jump	NM		Did not advance	
