= Serbia at the 2019 World Athletics Championships =

Serbia at the 2019 World Championships in Athletics
- WA code: SRB

in Doha, Qatar 27 September 2019 – 6 October 2019
- Competitors: 3 (2 men and 1 woman) in 1 event
- Medals: Gold 0 Silver 0 Bronze 0 Total 0

World Championships in Athletics appearances
- 2007; 2009; 2011; 2013; 2015; 2017; 2019; 2022; 2023; 2025

Other related appearances
- Yugoslavia (1983–1991); Serbia and Montenegro (1998–2005)

Serbia competed at the 2019 World Athletics Championships in Doha, Qatar, from 27 September to 6 October 2019.

== Results ==
=== Men ===
Field events

Athlete	Event	Qualification		Final	
Athlete	Event	Result	Rank	Result	Rank
Asmir Kolašinac	Shot put	19.86	27	Did not advance	
Armin Sinančević	Shot put	21.51 PB	4 Q	NM	

=== Women ===
Field events

Athlete	Event	Qualification		Final	
Athlete	Event	Result	Rank	Result	Rank
Dragana Tomašević	Discus throw	57.13	21	Did not advance	
