= Serbia at the 2017 World Championships in Athletics =

- WA code: SRB
- Website: www.ass.org.rs

in London
- Competitors: 8 in 8 events
- Medals: Gold 0 Silver 0 Bronze 0 Total 0

World Championships in Athletics appearances
- 2007; 2009; 2011; 2013; 2015; 2017; 2019; 2022; 2023; 2025

Other related appearances
- Yugoslavia (1983–1991); Serbia and Montenegro (1998–2005)

Serbia competed at the 2017 World Championships in Athletics in London, United Kingdom, from 4–13 August 2017.

== Results ==
(q = qualified, NM = no mark, SB = season best)

=== Men ===
Track and road events

Athlete	Event	Heat		Semifinal		Final	
Athlete	Event	Result	Rank	Result	Rank	Result	Rank
Milan Ristić	110 metres hurdles	DQ	–	Did not advance			

Field events

Athlete	Event	Qualification		Final	
Athlete	Event	Distance	Position	Distance	Position
Lazar Anić	Long jump	7.71	23	Did not advance	

Combined events – Decathlon

Athlete	Event	100 m	LJ	SP	HJ	400 m	110H	DT	PV	JT	1500 m	Final	Rank
Mihail Dudaš	Result	10.75 SB	7.46 SB	13.02	2.02 SB	48.08 SB	DQ	43.23	DNS	–	–	DNF	–
Mihail Dudaš	Points	917	925	668	822	905	0	730	0			DNF	–

=== Women ===
Track and road events

Athlete	Event	Heat		Semifinal		Final	
Athlete	Event	Result	Rank	Result	Rank	Result	Rank
Tamara Salaški	400 metres	52.13	23	Did not advance			
Amela Terzić	1500 metres	4:08.55	22	Did not advance			
Teodora Simović	Marathon	—N/a				2:59.01	75

Field events

Athlete	Event	Qualification		Final	
Athlete	Event	Distance	Position	Distance	Position
Ivana Španović	Long jump	6.62	4 q	6.96	4
Dragana Tomašević	Discus throw	57.78	19	Did not advance	
