= 2023 World Athletics Championships – Women's javelin throw =

Women's javelin throw at the 2023 World Championships
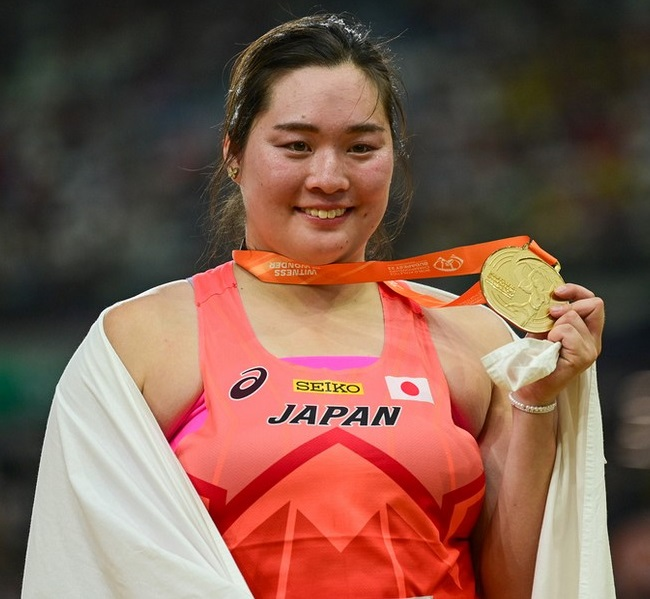
- Haruka Kitaguchi at the medal ceremony.
- Venue: National Athletics Centre
- Dates: 23 August (qualification); 25 August (final)
- Competitors: 36 from 25 nations
- Winning distance: 66.73

Medalists
gold medal	Haruka Kitaguchi	Japan
silver medal	Flor Ruiz	Colombia
bronze medal	Mackenzie Little	Australia

The women's javelin throw at the 2023 World Athletics Championships was held at the National Athletics Centre in Budapest on 23 and 25 August 2023.

== Summary ==
There were a few surprises in the javelin. Defending champion Kelsey-Lee Barber barely made the final. Her final throw of the preliminary round getting the 12th spot. Later, her third throw in the finals barely reached 8th place and she wouldn't get any further luck.

Veteran Flor Ruiz's season best was 61.83m, dating back to March. Her personal best of 63.84m dated back to 2016. In the first round of the final, she launched a South American record 65.47 m (214 ft 9 in). Only returning bronze medalist/world leader Haruka Kitaguchi, 61.78m and Olympic gold medalist Liu Shiying 61.66m, were able to get over 60 meters. Victoria Hudson threw 62.14m to start the second round, and Kitaguchi improved to 61.99m. Kitaguchi's third round effort of 63.00m put her into silver position. In the fourth round, Anete Kociņa moved into silver position with a 63.18m. Then in the final round Mackenzie Little jumped into the silver position with a 63.38m dropping Kitaguchi out of the medals. But Kitaguchi still had her last attempt and she used it to throw 66.73 m (218 ft 11 in) to leapfrog into the gold medal.

== Records ==
Before the competition records were as follows:

Record	Athlete & Nat.	Perf.	Location	Date
World record	Barbora Špotáková (CZE)	72.28 m	Stuttgart, Germany	13 September 2008
Championship record	Osleidys Menéndez (CUB)	71.70 m	Helsinki, Finland	14 August 2005
World Leading	Haruka Kitaguchi (JPN)	67.04 m	Chorzów, Poland	16 July 2023
African Record	Sunette Viljoen (RSA)	69.35 m	New York City, United States	9 June 2012
Asian Record	Lyu Huihui (CHN)	67.98 m	Shenyang, China	2 August 2019
North, Central American and Caribbean record	Osleidys Menéndez (CUB)	71.70 m	Helsinki, Finland	14 August 2005
South American Record	Flor Ruiz (COL)	63.84 m	Cali, Colombia	25 June 2016
European Record	Barbora Špotáková (CZE)	72.28 m	Stuttgart, Germany	13 September 2008
Oceanian record	Kathryn Mitchell (AUS)	68.92 m	Gold Coast, Australia	11 April 2018

== Qualification standard ==
The standard to qualify automatically for entry was 63.80 m.

== Schedule ==
The event schedule, in local time (UTC+2), was as follows:

Date	Time	Round
23 August	11:55	Qualification
25 August	20:20	Final

== Results ==
=== Qualification ===
Qualification: Qualifying distance 61.50 (Q) or the 12 best athletes including ties (q) qualify to the final.

Rank	Group	Name	Nationality	Round			Mark	Notes
Rank	Group	Name	Nationality	1	2	3	Mark	Notes
1	A	Līna Mūze	Latvia	53.96	56.88	63.50	63.50	Q
2	B	Mackenzie Little	Australia	50.94	58.79	63.45	63.45	Q
3	A	Haruka Kitaguchi	Japan	59.04	63.27		63.27	Q
4	A	Victoria Hudson	Austria	62.96			62.96	Q
5	A	María Lucelly Murillo	Colombia	59.34	62.72		62.72	Q, PB
6	A	Kathryn Mitchell	Australia	62.10			62.10	Q, SB
7	B	Flor Ruiz	Colombia	60.73	60.23	62.05	62.05	Q, SB
8	B	Anete Kociņa	Latvia	x	61.27	58.46	61.27	q
9	A	Liu Shiying	China	60.41	x	60.72	60.72	q
10	A	Jo-Ane van Dyk	South Africa	59.34	57.59	60.09	60.09	q
11	B	Jucilene de Lima	Brazil	58.39	57.94	59.76	59.76	q
12	A	Kelsey-Lee Barber	Australia	58.10	55.90	59.66	59.66	q
13	B	Tori Peeters	New Zealand	57.95	59.59	54.46	59.59	
14	B	Liveta Jasiūnaitė	Lithuania	59.00	56.88	57.61	59.00	
15	B	Marina Saito	Japan	x	56.24	58.95	58.95	
16	A	Adriana Vilagoš	Serbia	58.65	58.10	55.55	58.65	
17	A	Anni-Linnea Alanen	Finland	53.66	54.79	58.30	58.30	
18	B	Maggie Malone	United States	56.27	57.85	54.46	57.85	
19	A	Annu Rani	India	57.05	x	56.01	57.05	
20	A	Réka Szilágyi	Hungary	56.21	54.14	x	56.21	
21	A	Momone Ueda	Japan	54.67	56.19	56.19	56.19	
22	A	Dilhani Lekamge	Sri Lanka	54.77	50.00	55.89	55.89	
23	B	Sara Kolak	Croatia	50.80	x	55.89	55.89	
24	B	Nikol Tabačková	Czech Republic	49.88	55.45	x	55.45	
25	A	Juleisy Angulo	Ecuador	x	52.82	55.27	55.27	
26	B	Angéla Moravcsik	Hungary	52.54	x	55.10	55.10	
27	A	Ariana Ince	United States	54.60	x	x	54.60	
28	A	Nikola Ogrodníková	Czech Republic	50.78	54.59	54.36	54.59	
29	A	Martina Ratej	Slovenia	54.41	x	53.35	54.41	
30	B	Elina Tzengko	Greece	53.70	54.27	x	54.27	
31	B	Marija Vučenović	Serbia	x	54.21	52.27	54.21	
32	B	Irena Gillarová	Czech Republic	54.15	x	53.06	54.15	
33	B	Rhema Otabor	Bahamas	48.34	53.62	x	53.62	
34	B	Sigrid Borge	Norway	52.09	x	53.34	53.34	
–	B	Eda Tuğsuz	Turkey	x	x	x	NM	
–	B	Gedly Tugi	Estonia	x	x	x	NM	

=== Final ===
The final started on 25 August at 20:20.

Rank	Name	Nationality	Round						Mark	Notes
Rank	Name	Nationality	1	2	3	4	5	6	Mark	Notes
1st place, gold medalist(s)	Haruka Kitaguchi	Japan	61.78	61.99	63.00	62.36	62.68	66.73	66.73	
2nd place, silver medalist(s)	Flor Ruiz	Colombia	65.47	62.45	62.89	59.73	x	60.97	65.47	AR
3rd place, bronze medalist(s)	Mackenzie Little	Australia	59.95	56.81	61.41	61.23	61.66	63.38	63.38	
4	Anete Kociņa	Latvia	59.04	58.82	59.66	63.18	x	62.02	63.18	SB
5	Victoria Hudson	Austria	59.08	62.14	59.20	62.92	59.56	59.84	62.92	
6	Liu Shiying	China	61.66	x	x	61.16	61.23	58.72	61.66	SB
7	Kelsey-Lee Barber	Australia	55.82	59.44	58.98	58.31	61.19	61.01	61.19	
8	Jucilene de Lima	Brazil	58.49	x	60.34	x	58.33	x	60.34	
9	Līna Mūze	Latvia	58.43	x	x				58.43	
10	Jo-Ane van Dyk	South Africa	57.43	54.45	53.99				57.43	
11	María Lucelly Murillo	Colombia	x	x	54.85				54.85	
	Kathryn Mitchell	Australia								DNS
