= Flor Ruiz =

Colombian javelin thrower (born 1991)

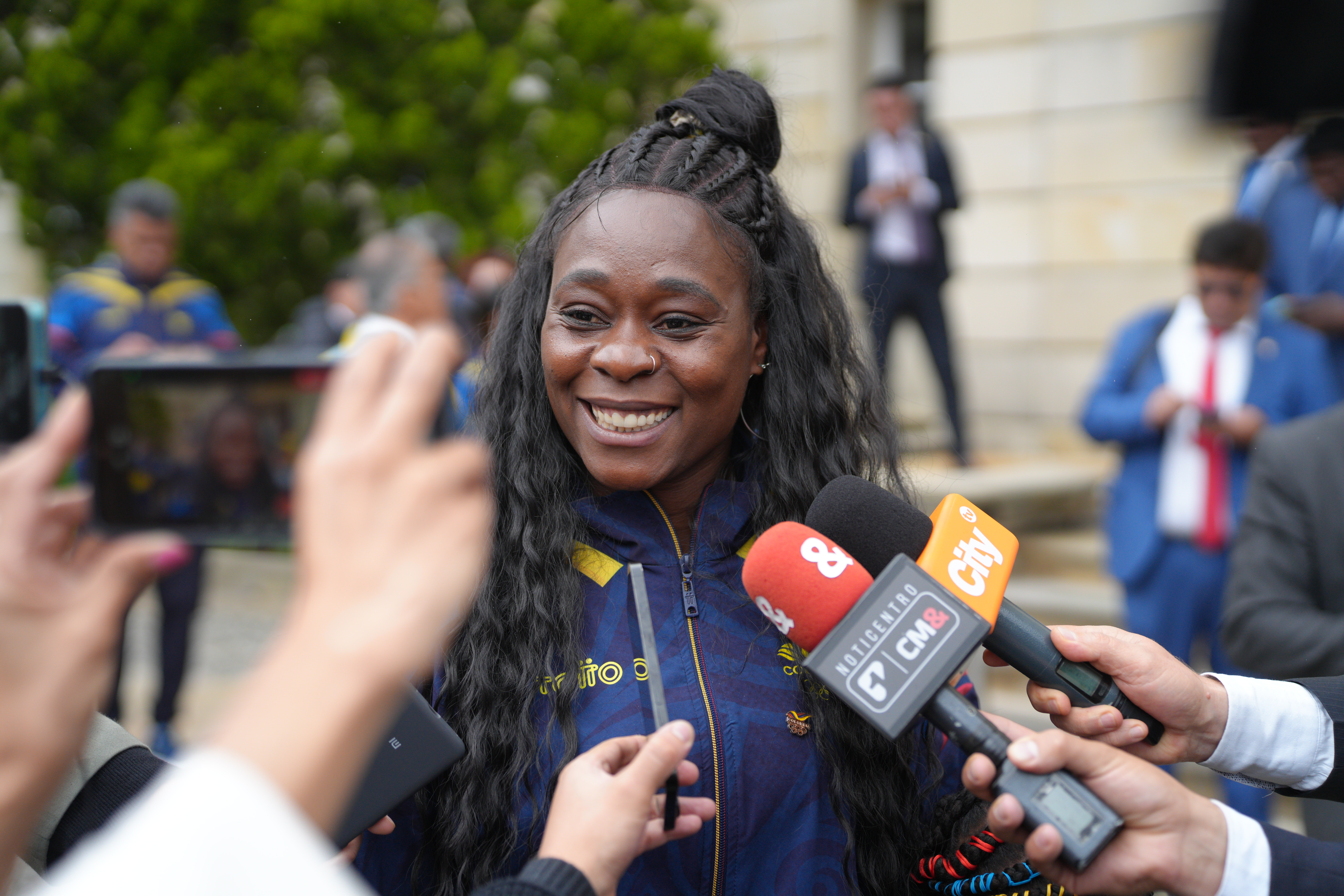
- Ruiz in 2024

Personal information
- Full name: Flor Denis Ruiz Hurtado
- Born: January 29, 1991 (age 35) Pradera, Valle del Cauca, Colombia
- Height: 1.71 m (5 ft 7 in)
- Weight: 67 kg (148 lb)

Sport
- Country: Colombia
- Sport: Athletics
- Event: Javelin throw

Achievements and titles
- Personal best: Javelin throw: 67.34 m AR (2026)
Medal record
Representing Colombia
Women's athletics
Event	1st	2nd	3rd
World Championships	0	1	0
World Ultimate Championship	0	0	1
Diamond League	0	0	1
Diamond League stage	0	1	2
Pan American Games	1	0	0
Ibero-American Championships	3	1	1
CAC Games	3	0	0
CAC Championships	0	1	0
South American Games	3	0	0
South American Championships	3	1	1
Total	13	5	6
World Championships
Silver medal – second place	2023 Budapest	Javelin throw
World Ultimate Championship
Bronze medal – third place	2026 Budapest	Javelin throw
Diamond League
Third place	2026	Javelin throw
Pan American Games
Gold medal – first place	2023 Santiago	Javelin throw
Ibero-American Championships
Gold medal – first place	2012 Barquisimeto	Javelin throw
Gold medal – first place	2016 Rio de Janeiro	Javelin throw
Gold medal – first place	2024 Cuiabá	Javelin throw
Silver medal – second place	2022 Alicante	Javelin throw
Bronze medal – third place	2014 São Paulo	Javelin throw
Central American and Caribbean Games
Gold medal – first place	2014 Veracruz	Javelin throw
Gold medal – first place	2023 San Salvador	Javelin throw
Gold medal – first place	2026 Santo Domingo	Javelin throw
Central American and Caribbean Championships
Silver medal – second place	2011 Mayagüez	Javelin throw
South American Games
Gold medal – first place	2014 Santiago	Javelin throw
Gold medal – first place	2022 Asunción	Javelin throw
Gold medal – first place	2026 Santa Fe	Javelin throw
South American Championships
Gold medal – first place	2013 Cartagena	Javelin throw
Gold medal – first place	2017 Asunción	Javelin throw
Gold medal – first place	2023 São Paulo	Javelin throw
Silver medal – second place	2015 Lima	Javelin throw
Bronze medal – third place	2019 Lima	Javelin throw
Bolivarian Games
Gold medal – first place	2013 Trujillo	Javelin throw
Gold medal – first place	2017 Santa Marta	Javelin throw
- Updated on 7 September 2025

Flor Denis Ruiz Hurtado (born 29 January 1991 in Pradera, Valle del Cauca) is a Colombian javelin thrower. She competed in the javelin throw event at the 2012, 2016, and 2024 Summer Olympics, reaching the final in 2016 and 2024. In 2023, she won a silver medal at the World Championships in Budapest.

On June 26, 2024, the Colombian Olympic Committee selected Ruiz and the track cyclist Kevin Quintero as the nation's flag bearers at Paris 2024.

== Personal bests ==
Event	Best (m)	Venue	Date
Javelin throw	67.34 AR	(Dominican Republic) Santo Domingo	4 August 2026

Key: AR = Area record, NR = National record

== International competitions ==
Year	Competition	Venue	Position	Event	Result
Representing Colombia
2010	South American Games / South American U23 Championships	Medellín, Colombia	4th	Javelin throw	49.08 m
2011	South American Championships	Buenos Aires, Argentina	7th	Javelin throw	48.78 m
2011	Central American and Caribbean Championships	Mayagüez, Puerto Rico	2nd	Javelin throw	54.02 m
2012	Ibero-American Championships	Barquisimeto, Venezuela	1st	Javelin throw	58.21 m
2012	Olympic Games	London, United Kingdom	32nd (q)	Javelin throw	54.34 m
2013	South American Championships	Cartagena, Colombia	1st	Javelin throw	60.23 m CR
2013	World Championships	Moscow, Russia	23rd (q)	Javelin throw	57.47 m
2013	Bolivarian Games	Trujillo, Peru	1st	Javelin throw	58.18 m GR
2014	South American Games	Santiago, Chile	1st	Javelin throw	60.59 m GR
2014	Ibero-American Championships	São Paulo, Brazil	3rd	Javelin throw	57.31 m
2014	Central American and Caribbean Games	Xalapa, Mexico	1st	Javelin throw	63.80 m A, AR, GR
2015	South American Championships	Lima, Peru	2nd	Javelin throw	59.86 m
2015	Pan American Games	Toronto, Canada	5th	Javelin throw	58.08 m
2015	World Championships	Beijing, China	27th (q)	Javelin throw	57.25 m
2016	Ibero-American Championships	Rio de Janeiro, Brazil	1st	Javelin throw	62.15 m
2016	Olympic Games	Rio de Janeiro, Brazil	9th	Javelin throw	61.54 m
2017	South American Championships	Asunción, Paraguay	1st	Javelin throw	61.91 m CR
2017	World Championships	London, United Kingdom	23rd (q)	Javelin throw	57.94 m
2017	Bolivarian Games	Santa Marta, Colombia	1st	Javelin throw	62.48 m GR
2019	South American Championships	Lima, Peru	3rd	Javelin throw	56.07 m
2019	Pan American Games	Lima, Peru	6th	Javelin throw	56.90 m
2021	South American Championships	Guayaquil, Ecuador	5th	Javelin throw	54.10 m
2022	Ibero-American Championships	La Nucia, Spain	2nd	Javelin throw	60.52 m
2022	South American Games	Asunción, Paraguay	1st	Javelin throw	62.97 m GR
2023	Central American and Caribbean Games	San Salvador, El Salvador	1st	Javelin throw	60.52 m
2023	South American Championships	São Paulo, Brasil	1st	Javelin throw	61.82 m
2023	World Championships	Budapest, Hungary	2nd	Javelin throw	65.47 m AR
2023	Memorial Van Damme	Brussels, Belgium	4th	Javelin throw	62.51 m
2023	Pan American Games	Santiago, Chile	1st	Javelin throw	63.10 m
2024	Xiamen Diamond League	Xiamen, China	3rd	Javelin throw	58.50 m
2024	Shanghai Diamond League	Suzhou, China	3rd	Javelin throw	60.70 m
2024	Ibero-American Championships	Cuiabá, Brazil	1st	Javelin throw	66.70 m AR, WL
2024	Olympic Games	Paris, France	5th	Javelin throw	63.00 m
2024	Kamila Skolimowska Memorial	Chorzów, Poland	6th	Javelin throw	59.24 m
2024	Memorial Van Damme	Brussels, Belgium	6th	Javelin throw	54.59 m
2025	Meeting International Mohammed VI d'Athlétisme de Rabat	Rabat, Morocco	4th	Javelin throw	59.67 m
2025	Bislett Games	Oslo, Norway	8th	Javelin throw	54.57 m
2025	Athletissima	Lausanne, Switzerland	7th	Javelin throw	53.97 m
2025	Weltklasse Zürich	Zurich, Switzerland	5th	Javelin	60.86 m
2025	World Championships	Tokyo, Japan	6th	Javelin throw	62.32 m
2026	Xiamen Diamond League	Xiamen, China	5th	Javelin throw	60.84 m
2026	Bislett Games	Oslo, Norway	4th	Javelin throw	61.11 m
2026	Meeting de Paris	Paris, France	5th	Javelin throw	61.23 m
2026	Herculis	Fontvieille, Monaco	—N/a	Javelin throw	NM
2026	Central American and Caribbean Games	Santo Domingo, Dominican Republic	1st	Javelin throw	67.34 m AR, GR
2026	Athletissima	Lausanne, Switzerland	2nd	Javelin throw	64.29 m
2026	Memorial Van Damme	Brussels, Belgium	3rd	Javelin throw	64.07 m
2026	World Ultimate Championship	Budapest, Hungary	3rd	Javelin throw	64.84 m
2026	South American Games	Santa Fe, Argentina	1st	Javelin throw	62.30 m

Olympic Games
Preceded by Laura Gómez; Carlos Andres Quintana	Flagbearer for Colombia; Paris 2024; With: Kevin Quintero	Succeeded by Incumbent
