= Serbia at the 2015 World Championships in Athletics =

- WA code: SRB
- Website: www.ass.org.rs

in Beijing
- Competitors: 5
- Medals Ranked 32nd: Gold 0 Silver 0 Bronze 1 Total 1

World Championships in Athletics appearances
- 2007; 2009; 2011; 2013; 2015; 2017; 2019; 2022; 2023; 2025

Other related appearances
- Yugoslavia (1983–1991); Serbia and Montenegro (1998–2005)

Serbia competed at the 2015 World Championships in Athletics in Beijing, China, from 22–30 August 2015.

== Medalists ==
| Medal | Athlete | Event | Date |
|---|---|---|---|
| Bronze | Ivana Španović | Long jump | 28 August |

== Results ==
(q – qualified, NM – no mark, SB – season best)

=== Men ===
Track and road events

| Athlete | Event | Heat | | Semifinal | | Final | |
| Athlete | Event | Result | Rank | Result | Rank | Result | Rank |
|---|---|---|---|---|---|---|---|
| Milan Ristić | 110 metres hurdles | 13.89 | 32 | did not advance | | | |

Field events

| Athlete | Event | Qualification | | Final | |
| Athlete | Event | Distance | Position | Distance | Position |
|---|---|---|---|---|---|
| Asmir Kolašinac | Shot put | 20.37 | 9 q | 20.71 | 7 |

=== Women ===
Track and road events

| Athlete | Event | Heat | | Semifinal | | Final | |
| Athlete | Event | Result | Rank | Result | Rank | Result | Rank |
|---|---|---|---|---|---|---|---|
| Amela Terzić | 800 metres | DNS | | | | | |
| Amela Terzić | 1500 metres | 4:06.07 | 14 Q | 4:13.92 | 10 | did not advance | |

Field events

| Athlete | Event | Qualification | | Final | |
| Athlete | Event | Distance | Position | Distance | Position |
|---|---|---|---|---|---|
| Ivana Španović | Long jump | 6.91 NR | 1 Q | 7.01 NR | 3rd place, bronze medalist(s) |
| Dragana Tomašević | Discus throw | 58.98 | 20 | did not advance | |
