= Latvia at the 2007 World Championships in Athletics =

- WA code: LAT
- National federation: Latvijas Vieglatlētikas savienība
- Website: www.lat-athletics.lv

in Osaka
- Competitors: 11
- Medals: Gold 0 Silver 0 Bronze 0 Total 0

World Championships in Athletics appearances
- 1993; 1995; 1997; 1999; 2001; 2003; 2005; 2007; 2009; 2011; 2013; 2015; 2017; 2019; 2022; 2023; 2025

Latvia competed at the 2007 World Championships in Athletics with a squad of 11 athletes.

== Results ==
Place	Athlete	Event	Results
4	Vadims Vasiļevskis	Javelin throw	85.19
11	Ēriks Rags	Javelin throw	80.01
14	Ainārs Kovals	Javelin throw	79.42
14	Igors Sokolovs	Hammer throw	73.92
15	Dmitrijs Miļkevičs	800m	1:46.27
17	Aiga Grabuste	Septiņcīņa	6019 (PR)
22	Staņislavs Olijars	110m/b	13.78
25	Māris Urtāns	Shot put	19.17
28	Igors Kazakēvičs	50 km walk	4:19.43
DNF	Jolanta Dukure	20 km walk	-
DNF	Ingus Janevics	50 km walk	-

== Competitors ==
=== Men ===
110 m/h: Staņislavs Olijars
800 m: Dmitrijs Milkevics
50 km Walk: Ingus Janevics and Igors Kazakēvičs
Shot put: Māris Urtāns
Hammer throw: Igors Sokolovs
Javelin throw: Vadims Vasilevskis, Ainārs Kovals and Ēriks Rags

=== Women ===
20 km Walk: Jolanta Dukure
Heptathlon: Aiga Grabuste
