= 2025 World Athletics Championships – Women's javelin throw =

Women's javelin throw at the 2025 World Athletics Championships
- Venue: National Stadium
- Location: Tokyo, Japan
- Dates: 19 September (qualification); 20 September (final)
- Winning distance: 65.12 m NR

Medalists
gold medal	Juleisy Angulo	Ecuador
silver medal	Anete Sietiņa	Latvia
bronze medal	Mackenzie Little	Australia

The women's javelin throw at the 2025 World Athletics Championships will be held at the National Stadium in Tokyo on 19 and 20 September 2025.

== Records ==
Before the competition records were as follows:

Record	Athlete & Nat.	Perf.	Location	Date
World record	Barbora Špotáková (CZE)	72.28 m	Stuttgart, Germany	13 September 2008
Championship record	Osleidys Menéndez (CUB)	71.70 m	Helsinki, Finland	14 August 2005
World Leading	Victoria Hudson (AUT)	67.76 m	Maribor, Slovenia	28 June 2025
African Record	Sunette Viljoen (RSA)	69.35 m	New York City, United States	9 June 2012
Asian Record	Lü Huihui (CHN)	67.98 m	Shenyang, China	2 August 2019
European Record	Barbora Špotáková (CZE)	72.28 m	Stuttgart, Germany	13 September 2008
North, Central American and Caribbean record	Osleidys Menéndez (CUB)	71.70 m	Helsinki, Finland	14 August 2005
Oceanian record	Kathryn Mitchell (AUS)	68.92 m	Gold Coast, Australia	11 April 2018
South American Record	Flor Ruiz (COL)	66.70 m	Cuiabá, Brazil	12 May 2024

== Qualification standard ==
The standard to qualify automatically for entry was 64.00 m.

== Schedule ==
The event schedule, in local time (UTC+9), is as follows:

Date	Time	Round
19 September	19:30	Qualification
20 September	21:05	Final

== Results ==
=== Qualification ===
All athletes over 62.50 m ( Q ) or at least the 12 best performers ( q ) advanced to the final.

==== Group A ====
Place	Athlete	Nation	Round			Mark	Notes
Place	Athlete	Nation	#1	#2	#3	Mark	Notes
1	Adriana Vilagoš	Serbia	61.22	61.11	66.06	66.06 m	Q
2	Mackenzie Little	Australia	65.54			65.54 m	Q, SB
3	Juleisy Angulo	Ecuador	x	63.25		63.25 m	Q, NR
4	Małgorzata Maślak-Glugla	Poland	57.47	61.79	x	61.79 m	q, PB
5	Jo-Ané du Plessis	South Africa	61.38	x	60.02	61.38 m	q
6	Valentina Barrios	Colombia	54.50	55.41	60.98	60.98 m	q
7	Momone Ueda	Japan	57.18	60.49	x	60.49 m	
8	Haruka Kitaguchi	Japan	60.31	60.38	58.80	60.38 m	
9	Jucilene Sales de Lima	Brazil	56.76	59.79	54.81	59.79 m	
10	Evelyn Bliss	United States	58.88	56.51	55.94	58.88 m	
11	Manuela Rotundo	Uruguay	52.98	x	57.43	57.43 m	
12	Dai Qianqian	China	x	57.34	53.34	57.34 m	
13	Irene Jepkemboi	Kenya	56.55	50.27	55.10	56.55 m	
14	Esra Türkmen	Turkey	52.98	55.99	54.16	55.99 m	
15	Annu Rani	India	54.54	55.18	55.10	55.18 m	
16	Sigrid Borge	Norway	54.59	x	54.90	54.90 m	
17	Līna Mūze-Sirmā	Latvia	54.49	53.25	53.53	54.49 m	
18	Andrea Železna	Czech Republic	53.43	x	x	53.43 m	

==== Group B ====
Place	Athlete	Nation	Round			Mark	Notes
Place	Athlete	Nation	#1	#2	#3	Mark	Notes
1	Anete Sietiņa	Latvia	58.69	60.94	63.67	63.67 m	Q, SB
2	Victoria Hudson	Austria	58.81	59.07	62.85	62.85 m	Q
3	Tori Moorby	New Zealand	62.78			62.78 m	Q, SB
4	Su Lingdan	China	62.18	r		62.18 m	q
5	Flor Ruiz	Colombia	62.11	60.92	x	62.11 m	q, SB
6	Elina Tzengko	Greece	59.76	61.10	61.31	61.31 m	q
7	Rhema Otabor	Bahamas	60.06	x	59.96	60.06 m	
8	Maria Andrejczyk	Poland	58.50	60.04	57.12	60.04 m	
9	Madison Wiltrout	United States	58.57	59.58	57.31	59.58 m	
10	Liveta Jasiūnaitė	Lithuania	57.04	58.66	x	58.66 m	
11	Marija Vučenović	Serbia	55.90	56.60	58.40	58.40 m	
12	Marie-Therese Obst	Norway	57.51	x	57.52	57.52 m	
13	Lianna Davidson	Australia	57.44	56.34	56.86	57.44 m	
14	Eda Tuğsuz	Turkey	56.16	x	52.57	56.16 m	
15	Sae Takemoto	Japan	55.11	54.23	x	55.11 m	
16	Sara Kolak	Croatia	52.87	x	54.49	54.49 m	
17	Daniella Mieko Nisimura	Brazil	53.01	51.36	52.04	53.01 m	
18	Petra Sičaková	Czech Republic	x	51.90	48.02	51.90 m	

=== Final ===
Place	Athlete	Nation	Round						Mark	Notes
Place	Athlete	Nation	#1	#2	#3	#4	#5	#6	Mark	Notes
1st place, gold medalist(s)	Juleisy Angulo	Ecuador	59.07	65.12	x	56.87	62.89	63.55	65.12 m	NR
2nd place, silver medalist(s)	Anete Sietiņa	Latvia	x	59.43	x	59.56	63.35	64.64	64.64 m	PB
3rd place, bronze medalist(s)	Mackenzie Little	Australia	63.58	61.42	58.28	61.59	60.19	60.75	63.58 m	
4	Jo-Ané du Plessis	South Africa	60.69	63.06	59.84	59.85	59.70	61.61	63.06 m	SB
5	Elina Tzengko	Greece	62.72	61.45	58.38	60.28	x	60.12	62.72 m	
6	Flor Ruiz	Colombia	58.80	60.94	59.20	62.32	58.94	x	62.32 m	SB
7	Tori Moorby	New Zealand	60.26	59.74	61.53	x	55.70		61.53 m	
8	Adriana Vilagoš	Serbia	52.93	57.31	60.00	61.29	61.20		61.29 m	
9	Su Lingdan	China	58.31	x	59.56	58.97			59.56 m	
10	Victoria Hudson	Austria	x	59.52	x	x			59.52 m	
11	Valentina Barrios	Colombia	57.85	54.29	59.14				59.14 m	
12	Małgorzata Maślak-Glugla	Poland	57.80	56.58	x				57.80 m	
