= Latvia at the 2009 World Championships in Athletics =

- WA code: LAT
- National federation: Latvijas Vieglatlētikas savienība
- Website: www.lat-athletics.lv

in Berlin
- Competitors: 15 (12 men 3 women)
- Medals: Gold 0 Silver 0 Bronze 0 Total 0

World Championships in Athletics appearances
- 1993; 1995; 1997; 1999; 2001; 2003; 2005; 2007; 2009; 2011; 2013; 2015; 2017; 2019; 2022; 2023; 2025

Latvia competed at the 2009 World Championships in Athletics from 15–23 August. A team of 15 athletes, 12 men and 3 women, was announced in preparation for the competition.

== Team selection ==
Track and road events

| Event | Athletes | |
| Event | Men | Women |
|---|---|---|
| 200 meters | Ronalds Arājs | |
| 800 meters | Dmitrijs Miļkevičs; Dmitrijs Jurkevičs | |
| 110 meter hurdles | Staņislavs Olijars | — |
| 400 meter hurdles | | Ieva Zunda |
| 50 km race walk | Ingus Janevics | — |

Field and combined events

| Event | Athletes | |
| Event | Men | Women |
|---|---|---|
| Shot put | Māris Urtāns | |
| Hammer throw | Igors Sokolovs; Ainārs Vaičulens | |
| Javelin throw | Vadims Vasiļevskis; Ainārs Kovals; Ēriks Rags | Madara Palameika |
| Heptathlon | — | Aiga Grabuste |
| Decathlon | Atis Vaisjūns | — |
