= Irene Jepkemboi =

Kenyan javelin thrower

Personal information
- Nationality: Kenyan
- Born: 5 February 2004 (age 22)

Sport
- Sport: Athletics
- Event: Javelin throw

Achievements and titles
- Personal bests: Javelin: 60.31 (Eugene, 2025) NR
Medal record
Women's athletics
Representing Kenya
Commonwealth Games
Bronze medal – third place	2026 Glasgow	Javelin throw
African U20 Championships
Silver medal – second place	2023 Ndola	Javelin throw

Irene Jepkemboi (born 5 February 2004) is a Kenyan javelin thrower. She is the national record holder in the event. In 2025 she became the first Kenyan woman to compete in the javelin throw at the World Athletics Championships.

== Biography ==
Jepkemboi attended Emkwen Primary School and Kaptebengewet High school in Uasin Gishu County. She later trained at the Complete Sports Training Camp in Kaptagat.

She won the silver medal in the javelin throw at the 2023 African U20 Championships in Ndola, Zambia in May 2023. She won the senior national title in the javelin throw at the Kenyan Athletics Championships in Nairobi in June 2023.

She moved to the United States to compete for Texas Christian University (TCU). In March 2024, she broke the Kenyan national record, previously set by Cecilia Kiplagat in 2007, with a 57.23m throw at the Texas A&M Invitational. She won the Big 12 Championships that year as a freshman, before finishing fourth overall at the 2024 NCAA Division I Outdoor Track and Field Championships, with a throw of 56.51 metres.

She threw a national record 60.31 metres whilst competing fir TCU at the NCAA Championships in Eugene, Oregon, placing third overall. She won the Kenyan Athletics Championships again in Nairobi in June 2025, with a throw of 57.88 metres.

She was selected to compete at the 2025 World Athletics Championships in Tokyo, Japan, qualifying via her world ranking. She threw 57.66 metres but did not advance to the final. In doing so, she became the second Kenyan athlete after Julius Yego, and the first Kenyan female, to compete in the javelin at the championships.

On 1 August 2026, Kepkemboi won the bronze medal at the 2026 Commonwealth Games in Glasgow, Scotland, with a throw of 57.85m.
