= Serbia at the 2013 World Championships in Athletics =

- WA code: SRB

in Moscow
- Competitors: 8
- Medals: Gold 0 Silver 0 Bronze 2 Total 2

World Championships in Athletics appearances
- 2007; 2009; 2011; 2013; 2015; 2017; 2019; 2022; 2023; 2025

Other related appearances
- Yugoslavia (1983–1991); Serbia and Montenegro (1998–2005)

Serbia competed at the 2013 World Championships in Athletics in Moscow, Russia, from 10–18 August 2013. A team of eight athletes was announced to represent the country in the event.

== Results ==
(q – qualified, NM – no mark, SB – season best)

=== Men ===
Track and road events

Athlete	Event	Preliminaries		Heats		Semifinals		Final	
Athlete	Event	Time	Rank	Time	Rank	Time	Rank	Time	Rank
Emir Bekric	400 metres hurdles			49.16	2 Q	48.36	2 Q NR	48.05	(bronze) NR
Predrag Filipovic	50 kilometres walk							-	DNF

Field events

Athlete	Event	Preliminaries		Final	
Athlete	Event	Width Height	Rank	Width Height	Rank
Asmir Kolasinac	Shot put	20.07	10 Q	19.96	10

Decathlon

Mihail Dudas	Decathlon			
Mihail Dudas	Event	Results	Points	Rank
	100 m	10.67 PB	935	5
	Long jump	7.51	937	7
	Shot put	13.45	695	27
	High jump	1.96	767	18
	400 m	47.73	922	3
	110 m hurdles	14.59 PB	900	16
	Discus throw	44.06	748	16
	Pole vault	4.90	880	14
	Javelin throw	59.06	724	20
	1500 m	4:26.62	767	8
Total			8275 NR	14

=== Women ===
Track and road events

Athlete	Event	Preliminaries		Heats		Semifinals		Final	
Athlete	Event	Time	Rank	Time	Rank	Time	Rank	Time	Rank
Amela Terzic	1500 metres			4:27.89	37	did not advance			

Field events

Athlete	Event	Preliminaries		Final	
Athlete	Event	Width Height	Rank	Width Height	Rank
Ivana Spanovic	Long jump	6.63	7 Q	6.82 NR	3rd place, bronze medalist(s)
Dragana Tomasevic	Discus throw	58.79	14	did not advance	
Tatjana Jelaca	Javelin throw	62.68 NR	6 Q	60.81	9
