= Serbia at the 2009 World Championships in Athletics =

- WA code: SRB

in Berlin
- Competitors: 9 (5 men, 4 women)
- Medals: Gold 0 Silver 0 Bronze 0 Total 0

World Championships in Athletics appearances
- 2007; 2009; 2011; 2013; 2015; 2017; 2019; 2022; 2023; 2025

Other related appearances
- Yugoslavia (1983–1991); Serbia and Montenegro (1998–2005)

Serbia competed at the 2009 World Championships in Athletics from 15–23 August in Berlin.

== Team selection ==
Track and road events

Event	Athletes	
Event	Men	Women
1500 metres	Goran Nava	Marina Muncan
10,000 metres		Olivera Jevtić
20 km race walk	Predrag Filipović	
50 km race walk	Nenad Filipović	

Field and combined events

Event	Athletes	
Event	Men	Women
Triple jump		Biljana Topić
High jump	Dragutin Topić	
Shot put	Asmir Kolašinac	
Discus throw		Dragana Tomašević

== Results ==
=== Men ===
Track and road events

Event	Athletes	Heats		Semifinal		Final	
Event	Athletes	Result	Rank	Result	Rank	Result	Rank
1500 m	Goran Nava	3:44.13	31	did not advance			
20km Walk	Predrag Filipović	-				1:27:44	35
50km Walk	Nenad Filipović	-				DNF	

Field and combined events

Event	Athletes	Qualification		Final	
Event	Athletes	Result	Rank	Result	Rank
High jump	Dragutin Topić	2.15	30	did not advance	
Shot put	Asmir Kolašinac	19.67	22	did not advance	

=== Women ===
Track and road events

Event	Athletes	Heats		Semifinal		Final	
Event	Athletes	Result	Rank	Result	Rank	Result	Rank
1500 m	Marina Muncan	4:15.18	34	did not advance			
10,000 m	Olivera Jevtić	-				DNS	

Field and combined events

Event	Athletes	Qualification		Final	
Event	Athletes	Result	Rank	Result	Rank
Triple jump	Biljana Topić	14.37 SB q	5	14.52 NR	4
Discus throw	Dragana Tomašević	59.38	19	did not advance	
