= Serbia at the 2023 World Athletics Championships =

- Flag of Serbia
- WA code: SRB

in Budapest, Hungary 19 August 2023 – 27 August 2023
- Competitors: 9 (4 men and 5 women)
- Medals Ranked 18th: Gold 1 Silver 0 Bronze 0 Total 1

World Athletics Championships appearances
- 2007; 2009; 2011; 2013; 2015; 2017; 2019; 2022; 2023

Other related appearances
- Yugoslavia (1983–1991); Serbia and Montenegro (1998–2005)

Serbia competed at the 2023 World Athletics Championships in Budapest, Hungary, from 19 to 27 August 2023.

== Medalists ==
| Medal | Athlete | Event | Date |
|---|---|---|---|
| Gold | Ivana Vuleta | Women's long jump | August 20 |

== Results ==
Serbia entered 9 athletes.

Key

- Q = Qualified for the next round
- q = Qualified for the next round as a fastest loser or, in field events, by position without achieving the qualifying target
- NR = National record
- PB = Personal best
- SB = Season best
- N/A = Round not applicable for the event

=== Men ===
Track and road events

| Athlete | Event | Heat | | Semifinal | | Final | |
| Athlete | Event | Result | Rank | Result | Rank | Result | Rank |
|---|---|---|---|---|---|---|---|
| Elzan Bibić | 1500 metres | 3:37.45 | 10 | Did not advance | | | |

Field events

| Athlete | Event | Qualification | | Final | |
| Athlete | Event | Distance | Position | Distance | Position |
|---|---|---|---|---|---|
| Slavko Stević | High jump | 2.22 | 23 | Did not advance | |
| Asmir Kolašinac | Shot put | 20.01 | 19 | Did not advance | |
| Armin Sinančević | Shot put | 20.92 | 9 q | 20.78 | 9 |

=== Women ===
Field events

| Athlete | Event | Qualification | | Final | |
| Athlete | Event | Distance | Position | Distance | Position |
|---|---|---|---|---|---|
| Angelina Topić | High jump | 1.92 | 7 q | 1.94 | 7 |
| Milica Gardašević | Long jump | 6.51 | 18 | Did not advance | |
| Ivana Vuleta | Long jump | 6.82 | 3 Q | 7.14 WL | 1st place, gold medalist(s) |
| Adriana Vilagoš | Javelin throw | 58.65 | 16 | Did not advance | |
| Marija Vučenović | Javelin throw | 54.21 | 31 | Did not advance | |
