= Momone Ueda =

Japanese javelin thrower

Personal information
- Born: 27 June 1999 (age 27) Itoshima, Fukuoka Prefecture, Japan
- Education: Fukuoka University

Sport
- Sport: Athletics
- Event: Javelin throw

Momone Ueda (上田 百寧, Ueda Momone; born 27 June 1999) is a Japanese athlete specialising in the javelin throw. She represented her country at the 2022 World Championships and at the 2024 Summer Olympics.

== Competition record ==
Year	Competition	Venue	Position	Event	Notes
Representing Japan
2022	World Championships	Eugene, United States	27th (h)	Javelin throw	50.70 m
2023	World Championships	Budapest, Hungary	21st (h)	Javelin throw	56.19 m
2024	Olympic Games	Paris, France	10th	Javelin throw	61.64 m
2025	Asian Championships	Gumi, South Korea	2nd	Javelin throw	59.39 m
