= Serbia at the 2011 World Championships in Athletics =

- WA code: SRB
- National federation: Atletski Savez Srbije
- Website: www.serbia-athletics.org.rs

in Daegu
- Competitors: 9
- Medals: Gold 0 Silver 0 Bronze 0 Total 0

World Championships in Athletics appearances
- 2007; 2009; 2011; 2013; 2015; 2017; 2019; 2022; 2023

Other related appearances
- Yugoslavia (1983–1991); Serbia and Montenegro (1998–2005)

Serbia competed at the 2011 World Championships in Athletics from August 27 to September 4 in Daegu, South Korea. A team of seven athletes represented the country in the event. The team was led by 2011 European Athletics U23 Championships 400m hurdles bronze medallist Emir Bekrić, and 2011 European Athletics U23 Championships long jump silver medallist Ivana Španović. The final team on the entry list comprises the names of 9 athletes.

== Results ==
=== Men ===
Athlete	Event	Preliminaries		Heats		Semifinals		Final	
Athlete	Event	Time Width Height	Rank	Time Width Height	Rank	Time Width Height	Rank	Time Width Height	Rank
Emir Bekrić	400 m hurdles			49.67	18	49.94	19	Did not advance	
Nenad Filipović	50 kilometres walk							DSQ	
Asmir Kolašinac	Shot put	20.14	12					19.84	11
Milan Jotanović	Shot put	18.39	25					Did not advance	

Decathlon

Mihail Dudaš	Decathlon			
Mihail Dudaš	Event	Results	Points	Rank
	100 m	10.81	903	7
	Long jump	7.41	913	7
	Shot put	13.76	714	21
	High jump	2.02 (SB)	822	7
	400 m	47.73	922	3
	110 m hurdles	14.89 (SB)	863	21
	Discus throw	43.97 (PB)	746	14
	Pole vault	4.90 (PB)	880	7
	Javelin throw	58.93(PB)	722	12
	1500 m	4:26.06 (SB)	771	6
Total			8256 (NR)	6

=== Women ===
Athlete	Event	Preliminaries		Heats		Semifinals		Final	
Athlete	Event	Time Width Height	Rank	Time Width Height	Rank	Time Width Height	Rank	Time Width Height	Rank
Ivana Španović	Long jump	DNS							
Biljana Topić	Triple jump	14.21 SB	11					14.03	10
Dragana Tomašević	Discus throw	60.45 q	8					62.48 (SB)	7
Tatjana Jelača	Javelin throw	56.68	24					Did not advance	
