= Dai Qianqian =

Chinese javelin thrower (born 2000)

Personal information
- Born: 23 August 2000 (age 25)

Sport
- Country: China
- Sport: Athletics
- Event: Javelin throw

Achievements and titles
- Personal best: Javelin 64.38m (2025)
Medal record
Women's athletics
Representing China
Asian Junior Championships
| Bronze medal – third place | 2018 Gifu | Javelin |
World U18 Championships
| Bronze medal – third place | 2017 Nairobi | Javelin |

Dai Qianqian (born 23 August 2000) is a Chinese javelin thrower. She competed at the 2024 Olympic Games and 2025 World Athletics Championships.

== Biography ==
In 2017, she won the bronze medal at the 2017 IAAF World U18 Championships in Nairobi, Kenya with a throw of 54.96 metres.

In June 2018, she won the bronze medal at the 2018 Asian Junior Athletics Championships in Gifu, Japan, with a throw of 53.29 metres. she improved her personal best to 55.46m in 2018. She then took sixth place at the 2018 World Athletics U20 Championships in Tampere with a throw of 52.95 metres, the following month.

In April 2024, she won the javelin throw event at the 2024 Xiamen Diamond League event in China. She was selected to compete at the 2024 Paris Olympics, where she managed a distance of 56.13 metres and did not qualify for the final.

She finishes fourth in the javelin throw event at the 2025 Xiamen Diamond League in China in April 2025. She threw a personal best 64.38 metres with her final throw of the competition to finish second at the 2025 Shanghai Diamond League event in China, on 3 May 2025. She competed at the 2025 World Athletics Championships in Tokyo, Japan, without qualifying for the final.
