= Agnese Pastare =

Latvian race walker

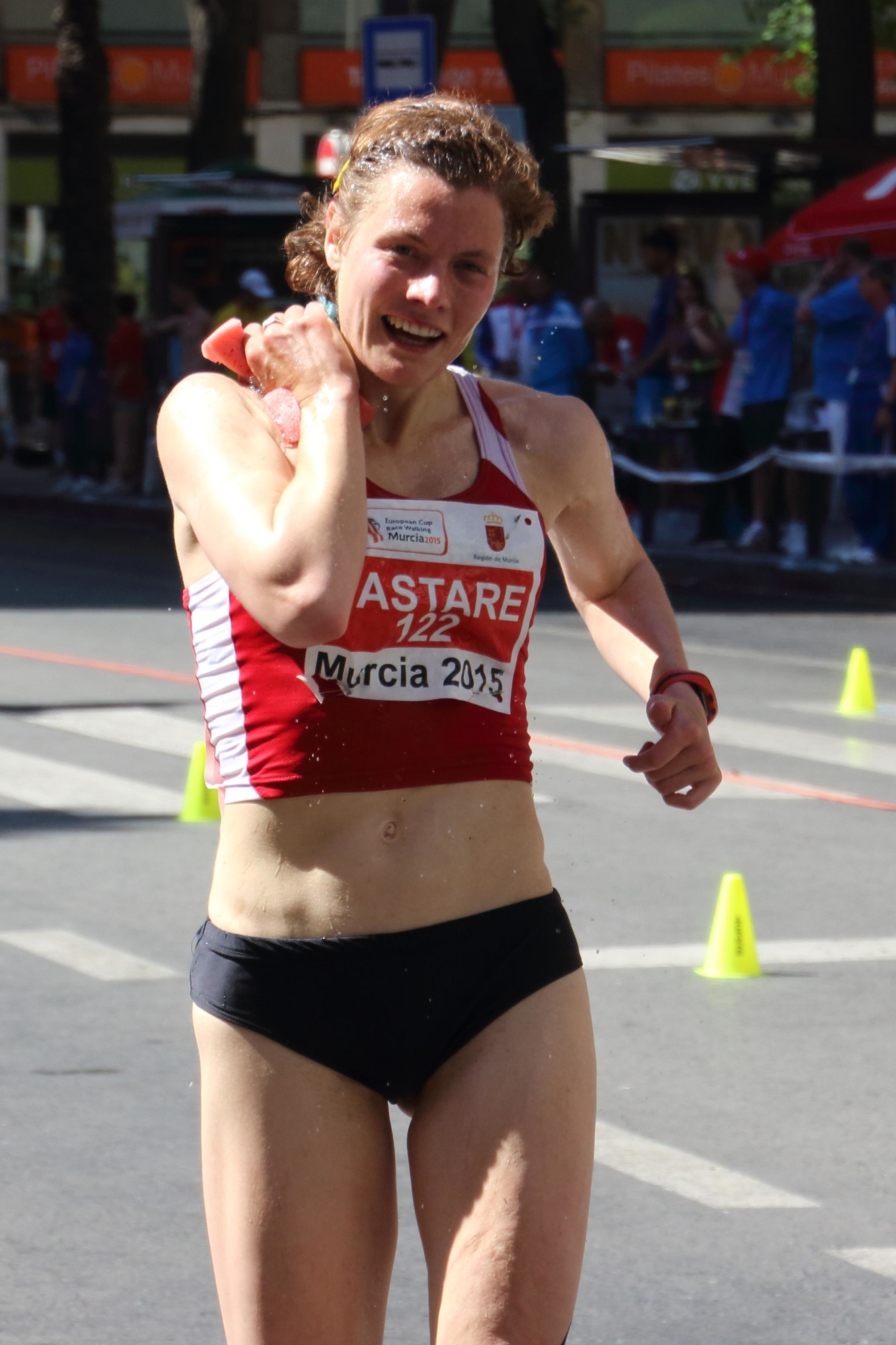

Personal information
- Nationality: Latvian
- Born: 27 October 1988 (age 37) Riga, Latvian SSR, Soviet Union
- Height: 1.78 m (5 ft 10 in)
- Weight: 70 kg (154 lb)

Sport
- Country: Latvia
- Sport: Track and field
- Event: 20 kilometres race walk
- Club: Ogre
- Coached by: Georgs Gutpelcs

Achievements and titles
- Olympic finals: London 2013, 24th
- Personal best(s): 1:29:55, Gdansk, 2013

Agnese Pastare (born 27 October 1988) is a Latvian race walker. She was born in Riga, and is a student of Riga Technical University, Faculty of Transport and Mechanical Engineering.

She has competed in 2011 World Championships where she finished 27th and the 2013 World Championships where she finished 23rd. In the 2012 Summer Olympics, in London, she finished 23rd. In 2013, she set the National Record in the 5000m race walk, State President`s Prize event, in Valmiera, with a time of 21:03.15.

She won the 20 km race at the International Road Walking Festival in Alytus in June 2012 finishing in front of Kristina Saltanovič and Brigita Virbalytė-Dimšienė.
