= Anete Sietiņa =

Latvian javelin thrower (born 1996)

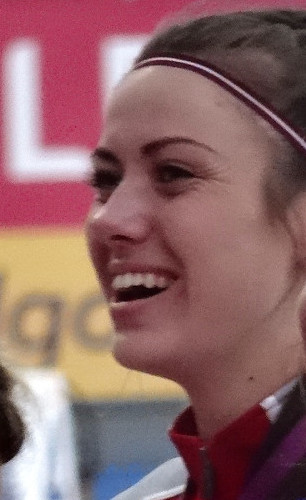
- Sietiņa in 2017

Personal information
- Nationality: Latvian
- Born: Anete Kociņa; 5 February 1996 (age 30) Limbaži, Latvia
- Height: 1.76 m (5 ft 9 in)
- Weight: 67 kg (148 lb)

Sport
- Country: Latvia
- Sport: Track and field
- Event: Javelin throw
- Coached by: Valentīna Eiduka

Achievements and titles
- Personal best: Javelin throw: 64.64m (2025)
Medal record
Women's athletics
Representing Latvia
World Championships
Silver medal – second place	2025 Tokyo	Javelin throw
European U23 Championships
Silver medal – second place	2017 Bydgoszcz	Javelin throw
European Junior Championships
Silver medal – second place	2015 Eskilstuna	Javelin throw

Anete Sietiņa (born Kociņa; 5 February 1996 in Limbaži) is a Latvian javelin thrower. She is a World Championships silver medallist and two-time Olympian. Sietiņa won the silver medal at the 2025 World Championships and represented Latvia at the 2020 and 2024 Olympic Games. She is also a European U23 Championships and European Junior Championships silver medallist. Her personal best throw of 64.64 m was set at the 2025 World Championships in Tokyo.

== Career ==
Sietina was born in Limbaži, Latvia, but was raised and schooled in nearby Salacgrīva at Salacgrīva Secondary School. She started in athletics at an early age in Salacgrīva and Riga and took part in a few throwing events before focusing on the javelin throw. Sietina won the silver medal in Eskilstuna, Sweden at the 2015 European Athletics Junior Championships. She won the silver medal in Bydgoszcz, Poland at the 2017 European Athletics U23 Championships and set a personal best of 64.47 metres. She competed at the 2017 World Athletics Championships in London, but did not qualify for the final.

She made her Olympic debut at the delayed 2020 Olympic Games in Tokyo, Japan in 2021, however, the event came at a bad time for her as she was carrying an injury and had not been able to train for the previous month prior to the Games, and although she competed she was not at her best and placed 21st overall.

Competing at the 2023 World Athletics Championships in Budapest, Hungary, she was sitting in second place for a part of the competition after managing a best throw of 63.18 metres with her fourth throw, but was unable to improve the mark and was ultimately pushed out of the medals and placed fourth overall by late throws by Mackenzie Little of Australian and Japanese thrower Haruka Kitaguchi.

In June 2024, she competed in the javelin throw at the 2024 European Athletics Championships in Rome, Italy, managing a distance of 57.71 metres to proceed to the final and making a throw of 59.32 metres on the final to place seventh overall. She competed in the women's javelin throw event at the 2024 Summer Olympics in Paris, France, throwing 60.47 metres to finish 11th in her qualifying group.

== International competitions ==
Year	Competition	Venue	Position	Notes
Representing Latvia
2014	World Junior Championships	Eugene, United States	22nd (q)	47.86 m
2015	European Junior Championships	Eskilstuna, Sweden	2nd	58.88 m
2017	European U23 Championships	Bydgoszcz, Poland	2nd	64.47 m
2017	World Championships	London, United Kingdom	13th (q)	62.17 m
2017	Universiade	Taipei, Taiwan	6th	58.49 m
2018	European Championships	Berlin, Germany	17th (q)	57.48 m
2019	World Championships	Doha, Qatar	24th (q)	56.70 m
2021	Olympic Games	Tokyo, Japan	22nd (q)	58.84 m
2023	World Championships	Budapest, Hungary	4th	63.18 m
2024	European Championships	Rome, Italy	7th	59.34 m
2024	Olympic Games	Paris, France	15th (q)	60.47 m
2025	World Championships	Tokyo, Japan	2nd	64.64 m
2026	European Championships	Birmingham, United Kingdom	13th (q)	56.24 m
2026	World Ultimate Championship	Budapest, Hungary	7th	58.17 m
