= Tori Peeters =

New Zealand javelin thrower (born 1994)

Personal information
- Full name: Victoria Elise Moorby
- Born: Victoria Elise Peeters; 17 May 1994 (age 32)
- Spouse: Cam Moorby (m. 2024)

Sport
- Country: New Zealand
- Sport: Track and Field
- Event: Javelin throw

Achievements and titles
- National finals: Javelin throw champion (2012, 2014, 2015, 2018, 2020, 2022, 2023, 2024, 2025, 2026)
- Personal bests: Javelin: 63.26m (Yokohama, 2023) NR
Medal record
Women's athletics
Representing New Zealand
Commonwealth Games
Silver medal – second place	2026 Glasgow	Javelin throw
Oceania Championships
Gold medal – first place	2026 Darwin	Javelin throw

Victoria Elise Moorby (née Peeters; born 17 May 1994) is a New Zealand athlete who is national record holder and a multiple national champion in the javelin throw.

== Early life and education ==
Peeters grew up from Gore and was educated at St Peter's College, Gore. She studied at the University of Otago in Dunedin, graduating with a Bachelor of Physical Education degree in 2017, and was then based in Cambridge, working at St Peter's School.

== Athletics career ==
Peeters broke the New Zealand national record for javelin throw for the time in March 2014, with a throw of 54.45m, breaking Kirsten Hellier’s previous record set in 1999.

At the Sydney Track Classic in February 2020, Peeters threw a personal best 62.04m which improved her own national record and placed her fifteenth for the year worldwide. Peeters was not selected for the 2020 New Zealand Olympic team, which was controversial for some.

In 2022, Peeters won the Oceanic Championship and competed for New Zealand at the 2022 World Athletics Championships where she placed 24th. She achieved sixth place in the final of the women’s javelin at the 2022 Commonwealth Games in Birmingham. In May 2023, she threw a new national record of 63.26m at the Yokohama Grand Prix, Japan.

Competing at the 2023 World Athletics Championships in Budapest, she finished 7 cm away from qualifying for the final.

In April 2024, she was named in the preliminary New Zealand squad for the 2024 Olympic Games. The following month, she finished third at Golden Grand Prix in Tokyo with a throw of 61.26 metres. She competed in the javelin at the 2024 Summer Olympics in Paris in August 2024.

She finished runner-up in the javelin throw event at the 2025 Xiamen Diamond League, China, in April 2025. She finished seventh at the 2025 Shanghai Diamond League event in China on 3 May 2025. She competed at the 2025 World Athletics Championships in Tokyo, Japan, placing seventh in the final.

Moorby won the javelin title at the 2026 New Zealand Athletics Championships in Auckland, throwing 58.78 metres. In May, she won the gold medal at the 2026 Oceania Athletics Championships in Darwin, Australia with a throw of 60.40 metres. On 1 August, Moorby won the silver medal at the 2026 Commonwealth Games in Glasgow, with a third-round throw of 60.44m.

== Personal life ==
In December 2024, Peeters married Cam Moorby at a rural wedding venue near Karapiro; their marriage celebrant was Sarah Cowley Ross. She has subsequently competed under her married name, Tori Moorby.
