= Mackenzie Little =

Australian javelin thrower (born 1996)

Personal information
- Nationality: Australia; United States
- Born: 22 December 1996 (age 29) Rochester, Minnesota, U.S.
- Height: 1.73 m (5 ft 8 in)

Sport
- Country: Australia
- Sport: Athletics
- Event: Javelin throw

Achievements and titles
- Personal best: Javelin throw: 64.27 m (2022)
Medal record
Women's athletics
Representing Australia
World Championships
Bronze medal – third place	2023 Budapest	Javelin throw
Bronze medal – third place	2025 Tokyo	Javelin throw
Commonwealth Games
Gold medal – first place	2026 Glasgow	Javelin throw
Silver medal – second place	2022 Birmingham	Javelin throw

Mackenzie Little (born 22 December 1996) is an American-born Australian javelin thrower. She qualified for the 2020 Tokyo Olympics and came second in her Women's javelin throw qualification with a throw of 62.37m. She later came eighth in the final.

== Early years ==
Mackenzie Little was born in Minnesota, but moved to Australia as an infant. She joined Sydney's Northern Suburbs Little Athletics as an Under-6. She loved playing many sports including soccer, softball, water polo and hockey. In Year 7 at Pymble Ladies College, she had her first javelin training session, after her hurdles competition was cancelled.

As a teenager, Little competed in javelin, 400m hurdles, and heptathlon at a national level. At the age of 15 she was already throwing over 50 metres. In 2013, Little earned a gold medal at the 2013 World Youth Championships in Ukraine. In 2014, at 17 years of age, she threw 57.60m.

== NCAA ==
Little has won 2 NCAA Javelin titles, 4 Pac-12 Conference titles, and is a 4-time All-American.

Representing Stanford University
Year	Competition	Venue	Rank	Event	Distance
2019	NCAA Division I Championships	(United States) Austin, Texas	1st	Javelin throw	59.44 m (195 ft 0 in)
2019	Pac-12 Conference Championships	(United States) Tucson, Arizona	1st	Javelin throw	59.13 m (193 ft 11 in)
2018	NCAA Division I Championships	(United States) Eugene, Oregon	1st	Javelin throw	60.36 m (198 ft 0 in)
2018	Pac-12 Conference Championships	(United States) Stanford, California	1st	Javelin throw	54.88 m (180 ft 0 in)
2017	NCAA Division I Championships	(United States) Eugene, Oregon	4th	Javelin throw	55.32 m (181 ft 5 in)
2017	Pac-12 Conference Championships	(United States) Eugene, Oregon	1st	Javelin throw	53.02 m (173 ft 11 in)
2016	NCAA Division I Championships	(United States) Eugene, Oregon	7th	Javelin throw	53.65 m (176 ft 0 in)
2016	Pac-12 Conference Championships	(United States) Seattle, Washington	1st	Javelin throw	53.71 m (176 ft 2 in)

== Achievements ==
Little graduated from Stanford University in 2019 with a Bachelor of Science in Human Biology. During her time at the university, she won two NCAA javelin titles and improved her best to 60.36m.

Little studied medicine at the University of Sydney's Medical School, graduating with an M.D. in 2023. In her 2020/21 season, she threw a personal best of 61.42m, becoming the sixth-best in Australian history.

Little represented Australia at the 2024 Summer Olympics in Paris.

Year	Competition	Venue	Rank	Event	Distance	Notes
2021	Olympic Games	(Japan) Tokyo	8th	Javelin throw	59.96 m	
2022	World Championships	(United States) Eugene, Oregon	5th	Javelin throw	63.22 m	
2022	Commonwealth Games	(England) Birmingham	2nd	Javelin throw	64.27 m	PB
2023	World Championships	(Hungary) Budapest	3rd	Javelin throw	63.38 m	
