= Anita Kažemāka =

Latvian long-distance runner

Personal information
- Born: 30 May 1990 (age 36) Preiļi

Sport
- Country: Latvia
- Sport: Track and field
- Event: Marathon

Anita Kažemāka (born 30 May 1990) is a Latvian long-distance runner. She competed in the marathon event at the 2015 World Championships in Athletics in Beijing, China.
