= Haruka Kitaguchi =

Japanese javelin thrower (born 1998)

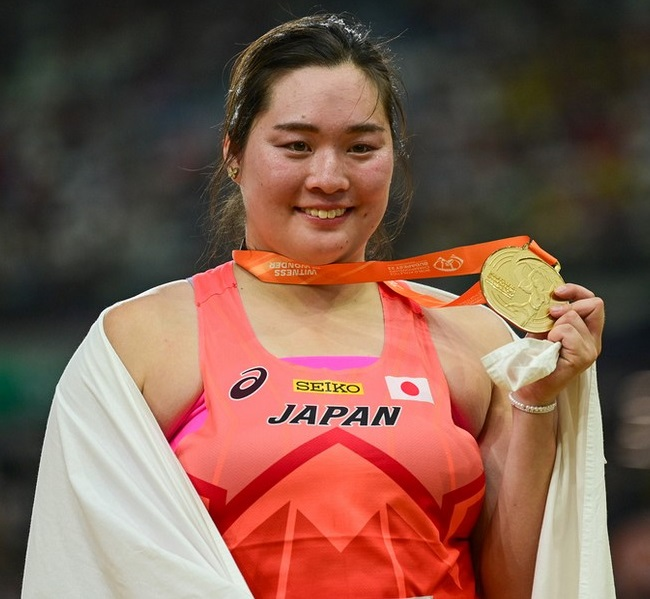
- Kitaguchi in 2023

Personal information
- Born: 16 March 1998 (age 28) Asahikawa, Hokkaido, Japan
- Height: 1.79 m (5 ft 10 in)
- Weight: 86 kg (190 lb)

Sport
- Sport: Athletics
- Event: Javelin throw

Achievements and titles
- Highest world ranking: 1st (2023)
- Personal best: Javelin throw: 68.92 (2026)
Medal record
Women's athletics
Representing Japan
Olympic Games
Gold medal – first place	2024 Paris	Javelin throw
World Championships
Gold medal – first place	2023 Budapest	Javelin throw
Bronze medal – third place	2022 Eugene	Javelin throw
World Ultimate Championship
First place	2026 Budapest	Javelin throw
Diamond League
First place	2023	Javelin throw
First place	2024	Javelin throw
Asian Games
Silver medal – second place	2026 Aichi–Nagoya	Javelin throw

Haruka Kitaguchi (北口 榛花, Kitaguchi Haruka; born 16 March 1998) is a Japanese female javelin thrower. She is the reigning Olympic champion in women's javelin throw.

== Early life and career ==
Kitaguchi won an individual gold medal at the Youth World Championships and has set Japanese national records in the discipline, throwing 66.00 m at the Honjo Athletic Stadium in Kitakyushu in 2019 and 67.38 m at the Memorial Van Damme event in Brussels in 2023. At the 2022 World Athletics Championships she won a bronze medal, which made her the first Japanese woman to win a medal in any throwing event at a World Championships or Olympics.

In 2023, in her best achievement to that point, she won the gold medal in javelin throw, in her 6th and final throw at the World Athletics Championships in Budapest.

Kitaguchi continued her dominance in the discipline when she claimed gold in the javelin event at the 2024 Summer Olympics in Paris.

In addition to English, Kitaguchi understands and speaks Czech. She lives and trains with Czech trainer David Sekerák in Domažlice, Czech Republic. In January 2024, she received a commemorative medal of the town of Domažlice.

== Competition record ==
Year	Competition	Venue	Position	Event	Notes
Representing Japan
2019	World Championships	Doha, Qatar	13th (q)	Javelin throw	60.84 m
2021	Olympic Games	Tokyo, Japan	12th	Javelin throw	55.42 m
2022	World Championships	Eugene, United States	3rd	Javelin throw	63.27 m
2023	World Championships	Budapest, Hungary	1st	Javelin throw	66.73 m
2024	Olympic Games	Paris, France	1st	Javelin throw	65.80 m
2025	World Championships	Tokyo, Japan	14th (q)	Javelin throw	60.38 m
2026	World Ultimate Championship	Budapest, Hungary	1st	Javelin throw	68.92 m
