= Igors Sokolovs =

Latvian hammer thrower

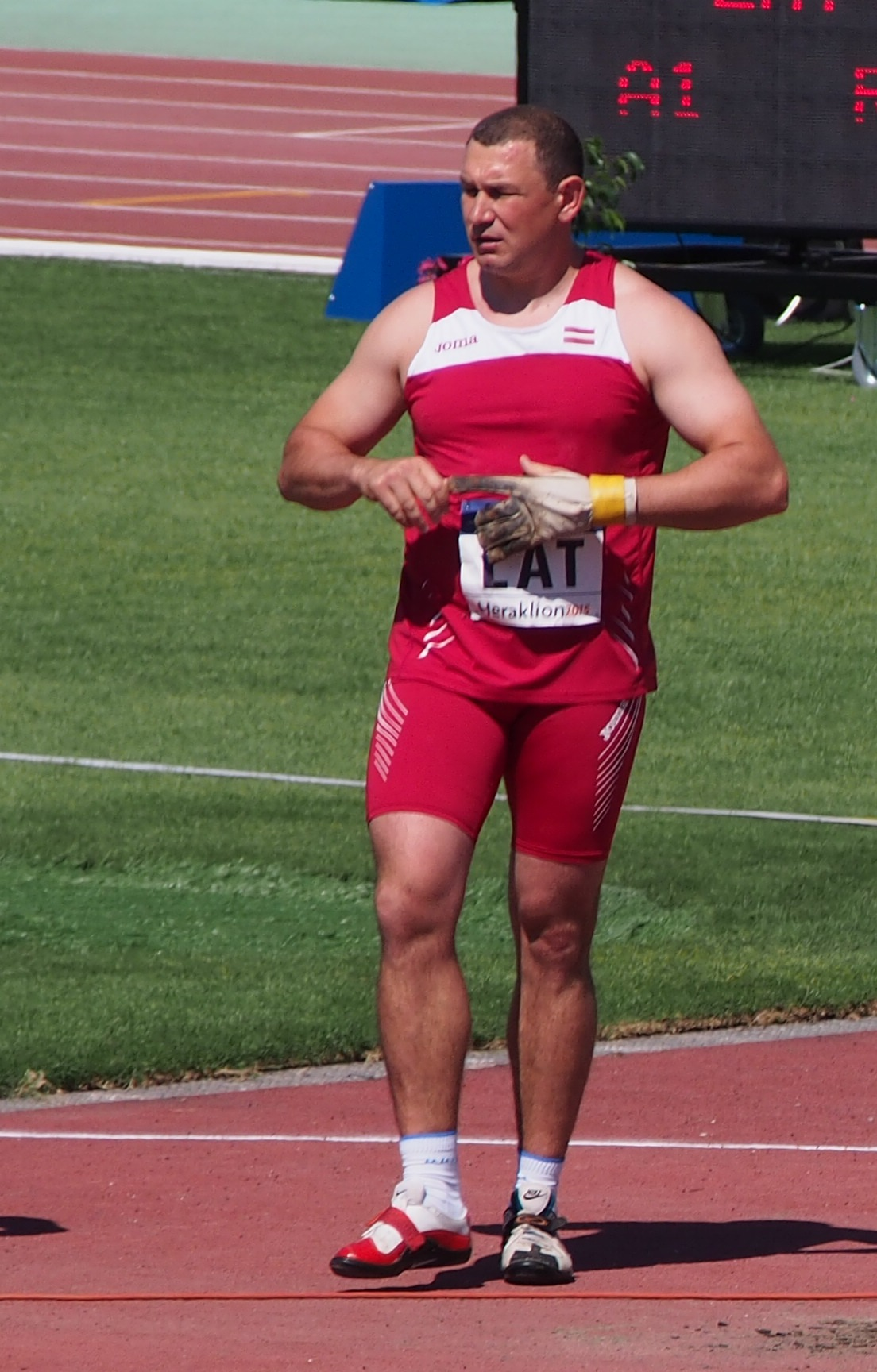
- Sokolovs during 2015 European Team Championships First League

Personal information
- Born: August 17, 1974 (age 51) Riga, Latvian SSR, Soviet Union
- Height: 1.87 m (6 ft 2 in)
- Weight: 110 kg (243 lb)

Sport
- Country: Latvia
- Sport: Athletics
- Event: Hammer throw
- Updated on 14 August 2012

Igors Sokolovs (born 17 August 1974 in Riga) is a Latvian hammer thrower.

He competed at the 2007 World Championships and the 2008 Olympic Games without reaching the final.

His personal best throw is 80.14 metres, achieved in May 2009 in Riga, which so far is the 5th best result in 2009 season in the world.

== Achievements ==
Year	Competition	Venue	Position	Notes
Representing Latvia
2007	World Championships	Osaka, Japan	14th	73.92 m
2008	Olympic Games	Beijing, PR China	19th	73.72 m
2009	World Championships	Berlin, Germany	17th	73.97 m
2009	World Athletics Final	Thessaloniki, Greece	2nd	79.32 m
2010	European Championships	Barcelona, Spain	14th	73.29 m
2011	World Championships	Daegu, South Korea	20th	72.95 m
