= Arnis Rumbenieks =

Latvian racewalker

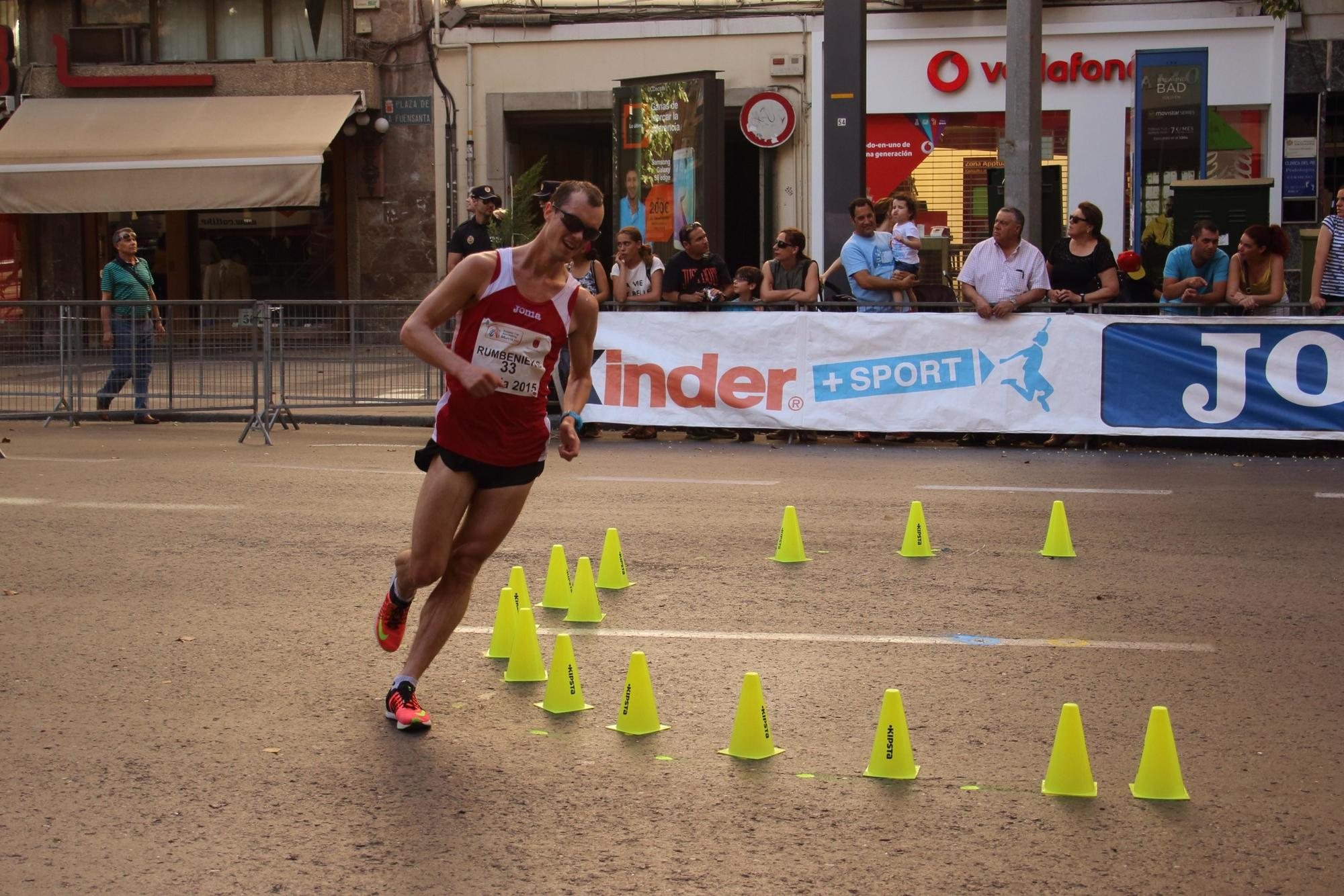
- Rumbenieks at the 2015 European Cup

Personal information
- Born: 4 April 1988 (age 38) Valmiera, Latvian SSR, Soviet Union
- Height: 1.75 m (5 ft 9 in)
- Weight: 65 kg (143 lb)

Sport
- Country: Latvia
- Sport: Track and field
- Event: 20 km walk
Medal record
Men's athletics
Representing Latvia
Baltic Championships
Gold medal – first place	2021 Ogre	10000 m walk

Arnis Rumbenieks (born 4 April 1988) is a Latvian track and field athlete competing in road walking. Rumbenieks has competed at 2010 European Championships. At the 2012 International Road Walking Festival in Alytus, Lithuania he finished second behind Marius Žiūkas at the 20 km walk. He has competed in the 20 km men's walk at the 2012 Summer Olympics in London. He competed at the 2016 Summer Olympics, in the 50 km walk. In 2018, he competed in the men's 50 kilometres walk at the 2018 European Athletics Championships held in Berlin, Germany. He did not finish his race.
