= Kathryn Mitchell =

Australian javelin thrower (born 1982)

Personal information
- Nickname: Mitch
- Nationality: Australian
- Born: 10 July 1982 (age 43) Hamilton, Victoria
- Height: 1.68 m (5 ft 6 in)
- Weight: 72 kg (159 lb)

Sport
- Country: Australia
- Sport: Athletics
- Event: Javelin
- Club: Eureka Athletics Club
Medal record
Women's athletics
Representing Australia
Commonwealth Games
Gold medal – first place	2018 Gold Coast	Javelin

Kathryn Mitchell (born 10 July 1982) is an Australian track and field athlete who competes in the javelin throw. She has represented her country at three Olympic Games, finishing ninth in 2012 and sixth in 2016. She won gold at the 2018 Commonwealth Games with a throw of 68.92 m, a Commonwealth Games, Australian and Oceanian record. It also ranks her ninth on the world all-time list.

== Personal life ==
Nicknamed Mitch, Mitchell was born on 10 July 1982 in Hamilton, Victoria. She calls Casterton her hometown but lives in Monte Carlo. She went to Casterton Primary School before going to high school at Casterton Secondary College and Ballarat High School. She has a Bachelor of Applied Science in Human Movement and is working on an advance degree in Nutritional Medicine. She is a fitness services instructor and health consultant.

== Athletics ==
Mitchell competes in javelin. As a fourteen-year-old, she started in the sport but did not begin to take the sport seriously until she was seventeen years old. She took up the sport after her sister borrowed a javelin from school to practice with it for a school event.

Mitchell was coached by Lindsay Burgoyne in high school. At the start of high school, she broke the school record by 4 metres (13 ft). She was coached by Eric Hollingsworth from 2003 to 2009. Uwe Hohn has been her coach since 2010. She trains at Olympic Park in Melbourne and has a scholarship with the Victorian Institute of Sport. She is a member of the Eureka Athletics Club.

In 2006, Mitchell represented Australia at the Commonwealth Games, where she made the finals in the javelin, finishing sixth overall. She finished first at the 2008 National Championships in Melbourne, Australia. In 2010, she set a Victorian state record in the javelin. At the 2010 Commonwealth Games, she finished fifth. Prior to competing in India, she spent four weeks training in Germany. She finished second at the 2011 National Championships in Melbourne, Australia. In January 2012, she competed at an Athletics Victoria inter-club meet, where she made a throw of 62.51 metres (205.1 ft). While this distance would have qualified her for Olympics, the nature of the meet precluded it from counting. She finished second at the 2012 National Championships in Melbourne, Australia with a throw of 59.23 metres (194.3 ft), short of the Olympic A-Qualifying distance of 61 metres (200 ft). She finished third at the 2012 Ostrava Golden Spike in Ostrava, Czech Republic. At the event, she threw a personal best throw of 64.34 metres (211.1 ft). In April, she finished second at the 2012 St. Wendel World Class Meeting in Germany. She was selected to represent Australia in the javelin event at the 2012 Summer Olympics, where she qualified for the final in the women's javelin. Before departing for London, she participated in a Germany-based training camp. At the Rio Summer Olympics in 2016, she placed 6th in the javelin throw final, with an effort of 64.36m.

Mitchell competed at the 2014 Commonwealth Games, finishing fourth, with a best throw 36 cm less than that of bronze medal winning compatriot Kelsey-Lee Roberts. She improved on this performance at the 2018 Games, winning gold with a throw of 68.92m and setting a new Commonwealth Games record.

At the 2020 Tokyo Olympics Mitchell finished sixth with a throw of 61.82m.

== International competitions ==
Year	Competition	Venue	Position	Event	Notes
2006	Commonwealth Games	Melbourne, Australia	6th	Javelin throw	55.22 m
2010	Commonwealth Games	Delhi, India	5th	Javelin throw	54.25 m
2012	Olympic Games	London, United Kingdom	9th	Javelin throw	59.46 m
2014	Commonwealth Games	Glasgow, United Kingdom	4th	Javelin throw	62.59 m
2016	Olympic Games	Rio de Janeiro, Brazil	6th	Javelin throw	64.36 m
2018	Commonwealth Games	Gold Coast, Australia	1st	Javelin throw	68.92 m GR
2022	World Championships	Eugene, United States	25th (q)	Javelin throw	53.09 m
2023	World Championships	Budapest, Hungary	6th (q)	Javelin throw	62.10 m^{1}
2024	Olympic Games	Paris, France	7th	Javelin throw	62.63 m

^{1}Did not start in the final
