= Rolands Štrobinders =

Latvian javelin thrower

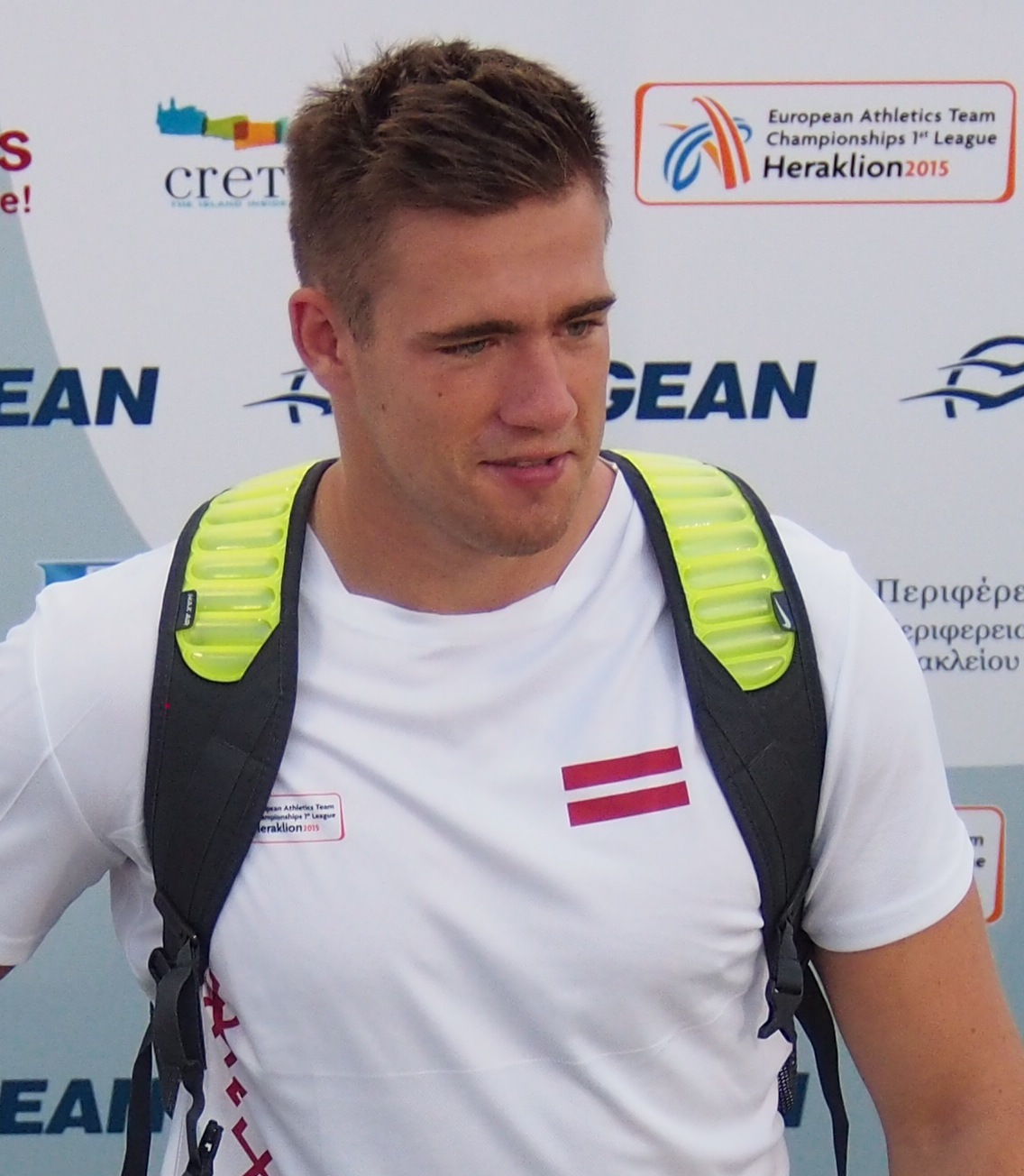
- Rolands Štrobinders during 2015 European Team Championships First League

Personal information
- Born: 14 April 1992 (age 34)
- Height: 1.90 m (6 ft 3 in)
- Weight: 93 kg (205 lb)

Sport
- Country: Latvia
- Sport: Track and field
- Event: Javelin throw
- Updated on 29 August 2015

Rolands Štrobinders (born 14 April 1992) is a Latvian athlete specialising in the javelin throw. He competed at the 2015 World Championships in Beijing without qualifying for the final.

His personal best in the event is 85.07 metres set in Bad Köstritz in 2017.

== Competition record ==
Year	Competition	Venue	Position	Event	Notes
Representing Latvia
2011	European Junior Championships	Tallinn, Estonia	4th	Javelin throw	75.71 m
2013	European U23 Championships	Tampere, Finland	4th	Javelin throw	78.71 m
2014	European Championships	Zurich, Switzerland	16th (q)	Javelin throw	76.16 m
2015	World Championships	Beijing, China	19th (q)	Javelin throw	79.11 m
2016	European Championships	Amsterdam, Netherlands	–	Javelin throw	NM
2016	Olympic Games	Rio de Janeiro, Brazil	28th (q)	Javelin throw	77.73 m
2017	World Championships	London, United Kingdom	19th (q)	Javelin throw	79.68 m
2018	European Championships	Berlin, Germany	11th	Javelin throw	76.59 m
2019	World Championships	Doha, Qatar	17th (q)	Javelin throw	81.09 m
2022	World Championships	Eugene, United States	15th (q)	Javelin throw	79.39 m
2022	European Championships	Munich, Germany	8th	Javelin throw	77.10 m
2023	World Championships	Budapest, Hungary	29th (q)	Javelin throw	74.46 m
2024	European Championships	Rome, Italy	–	Javelin throw	NM

== Seasonal bests by year ==
- 2010 – 68.88
- 2011 – 75.71
- 2012 – 81.20
- 2013 – 81.68
- 2014 – 83.10
- 2015 – 83.37
- 2016 – 81.76
- 2017 – 85.07
