= 2011 World Youth Championships in Athletics – Girls' javelin throw =

Girls' javelin throw at the 2011 World Youth Championships in Athletics
- Venue: Stadium Lille Métropole
- Dates: 6 July (qualification); 7 July (final)
- Competitors: 32
- Winning distance: 59.74 CR

Medalists
gold medal	Christin Hussong	Germany
silver medal	Sofi Flink	Sweden
bronze medal	Monique Cilione	Australia

The girls' javelin throw at the 2011 World Youth Championships in Athletics was held at the Stadium Lille Métropole on 6 and 7 July.

== Medalists ==
Gold	Silver	Bronze
Christin Hussong; Germany	Sofi Flink; Sweden	Monique Cilione; Australia

== Records ==
Prior to the competition, the following records were as follows.

World Youth Best	Xue Juan (CHN)	62.93	Changsha, China	27 October 2003
Championship Record	Xue Juan (CHN)	56.82	Sherbrooke, Canada	13 July 2003
World Youth Leading	Christin Hussong (GER)	55.36	Halle, Germany	22 May 2011

== Qualification ==
Qualification rule: qualification standard 50.00 m or at least best 12 qualified.

=== Group A ===
Rank	Name	Nationality	#1	#2	#3	Result	Notes
1	Haley Crouser	United States	50.60	x	x	50.60	Q
2	Ismaray Armenteros	Cuba	x	47.55	49.79	49.79	q
3	Signe Jēkabsone	Latvia	48.90	x	x	48.90	q, PB
4	Tetiana Fetiskina	Ukraine	x	48.41	x	48.41	q
5	Daliadiz Ortiz	Puerto Rico	47.49	45.93	44.78	47.49	q
6	Eva Vivod	Slovenia	46.54	x	46.82	46.82	q
7	Alina Gerasimchuk	Russia	x	x	46.48	46.48	
8	Hiroko Takigawa	Japan	46.24	46.36	43.69	46.36	
9	Wasie Toolis	Australia	44.31	43.37	45.85	45.85	
10	Klodiana Bousgiokai	Greece	44.82	44.38	41.54	44.82	
11	Joanna Emmanouilidou	Germany	44.63	x	39.03	44.63	
12	Chang Yiting	China	x	44.27	39.50	44.27	
13	Ane Dahlen	Norway	44.14	x	43.02	44.14	
14	Arantza Moreno	Spain	x	x	41.51	41.51	
15	Eszter Balogh	Hungary	39.27	40.95	40.22	40.95	
16	Li Jiayue	China	35.74	39.85	x	39.85	

=== Group B ===
Rank	Name	Nationality	#1	#2	#3	Result	Notes
1	Christin Hussong	Germany	56.76			56.76	Q, WYL
2	Alexie Alaïs	France	49.88	44.60	53.54	53.54	Q, PB
3	Sofi Flink	Sweden	50.68			50.68	Q
4	Monique Cilione	Australia	49.84	49.23	–	49.84	q
5	María Mello	Uruguay	49.25	45.13	46.70	49.25	q, PB
6	Ai Yamauchi	Japan	47.82	47.93	43.85	47.93	q
7	Lee Geum-hee	South Korea	46.37	x	44.70	46.37	
8	Liveta Jasiūnaitė	Lithuania	46.32	40.80	x	46.32	
9	Mihaela Tacu	Moldova	44.72	46.27	45.90	46.27	PB
10	Katja Zof	Slovenia	39.86	45.70	x	45.70	
11	Nicole Prenner	Austria	45.10	40.33	39.06	45.10	
12	Vasiliki Kotsovou	Greece	45.07	42.35	x	45.07	
13	Marcelina Witek	Poland	x	44.71	41.60	44.71	
14	Ingeborg Rønningen	Norway	42.59	x	x	42.59	
15	Katrina Sirma	Latvia	x	41.24	41.97	41.97	
16	Sune Wittmann	Namibia	x	41.68	37.01	41.68	

== Final ==
Rank	Name	Nationality	#1	#2	#3	#4	#5	#6	Result	Notes
1st place, gold medalist(s)	Christin Hussong	Germany	56.54	52.60	x	57.84	58.09	59.74	59.74	CR
2nd place, silver medalist(s)	Sofi Flink	Sweden	47.86	52.25	49.30	54.62	51.06	x	54.62	PB
3rd place, bronze medalist(s)	Monique Cilione	Australia	52.21	44.44	49.03	50.51	48.91	52.77	52.77	PB
4	Haley Crouser	United States	47.28	51.97	x	49.70	48.16	50.07	51.97	
5	Ismaray Armenteros	Cuba	48.12	x	x	x	50.21	45.82	50.21	
6	Alexie Alaïs	France	44.62	43.27	47.70	49.33	46.36	41.63	49.33	
7	Daliadiz Ortiz	Puerto Rico	x	47.95	46.72	x	47.57	47.96	47.96	
8	Tetiana Fetiskina	Ukraine	41.61	47.10	44.71	47.48	x	47.56	47.56	
9	María Mello	Uruguay	39.51	46.62	42.33				46.62	
10	Eva Vivod	Slovenia	42.49	44.26	40.59				44.26	
11	Signe Jēkabsone	Latvia	42.71	41.58	43.15				43.15	
12	Ai Yamauchi	Japan	41.85	x	42.96				42.96	
