= 2013 World Youth Championships in Athletics – Girls' javelin throw =

Girls' javelin throw at the 2013 World Youth Championships in Athletics
- Venue: RSC Olimpiyskiy
- Dates: 10 July (qualification); 11 July (final)
- Competitors: 39
- Winning distance: 61.47 CR

Medalists
gold medal	Mackenzie Little	Australia
silver medal	Yulenmis Aguilar	Cuba
bronze medal	Anete Kociņa	Latvia

The girls' javelin throw at the 2013 World Youth Championships in Athletics was held on 10 and 11 July.

== Medalists ==
Gold	Silver	Bronze
Mackenzie Little; Australia	Yulenmis Aguilar; Cuba	Anete Kociņa; Latvia

== Records ==
Prior to the competition, the following records were as follows.

World Youth Best	Xue Juan (CHN)	62.93	Changsha, China	27 October 2003
Championship Record	–	–	–	–
World Youth Leading	Ilaria Casarotto (ITA)	56.97	Rome, Italy	9 June 2013

== Qualification ==
Qualification rule: 51.00 (Q) or at least 12 best performers (q) qualified.

Rank	Group	Name	Nationality	#1	#2	#3	Result	Notes
1	A	Fabienne Schönig	Germany	52.16			52.16	Q, CR
2	A	Réka Szilágyi	Hungary	51.32			51.32	Q
3	A	Yulenmis Aguilar	Cuba	45.45	51.26		51.26	Q
4	B	Lena Lilie	Germany	46.54	47.11	51.17	51.17	Q, PB
5	A	Raimu Tanaka	Japan	50.87	50.50	x	50.87	q, PB
6	A	Mackenzie Little	Australia	50.69	47.71	46.72	50.69	q
7	A	Kang Qiyan	China	46.20	x	50.06	50.06	q
8	B	Anete Kociņa	Latvia	49.99	x	45.07	49.99	q
9	A	Andrija Priedīte	Latvia	x	43.77	49.87	49.87	q, PB
10	A	Ilaria Casarotto	Italy	49.38	45.49	49.20	49.38	q
11	B	Jo-Ané van Dyk	South Africa	49.30	46.65	46.30	49.30	q
12	A	Eda Tuğsuz	Turkey	x	49.18	47.31	49.18	q
13	B	Marija Bogavac	Montenegro	x	47.88	48.66	48.66	PB
14	B	Nagisa Mori	Japan	x	41.04	48.60	48.60	PB
15	B	Varvara Nazarova	Kazakhstan	x	48.48	43.89	48.48	PB
16	A	Luz Castro	Mexico	43.11	40.27	48.34	48.34	PB
17	B	Natálie Durčáková	Czech Republic	47.55	46.64	48.13	48.13	
18	A	Magdalena Dielacher	Austria	45.76	44.98	47.83	47.83	
19	A	Marie-Therese Obst	Norway	x	x	47.74	47.74	
20	A	Triin Junson	Estonia	44.13	46.78	x	46.78	PB
21	B	Viktoriya Neboshchytska	Ukraine	44.82	x	46.76	46.76	
22	B	Estefany Chacón	Venezuela	46.72	46.00	45.28	46.72	
23	B	Luciana Huarte	Argentina	46.70	x	x	46.70	PB
24	A	Song Han-sol	South Korea	46.16	x	x	46.16	PB
25	B	Joana Soares	Brazil	45.88	44.06	45.74	45.88	
26	B	Maria Andrejczyk	Poland	43.29	45.14	37.97	45.14	
27	A	Ana Pires	Brazil	45.10	43.80	41.18	45.10	
28	B	Bailey Dell	Canada	x	44.59	45.00	45.00	
29	B	Wang Meng	China	44.80	x	40.72	44.80	
30	B	Victoria Hudson	Austria	42.45	44.53	43.26	44.53	
31	A	Brittni Wolczyk	Canada	44.38	42.80	42.62	44.38	
32	A	Katia Coquis	Spain	44.19	41.01	37.94	44.19	
33	B	Sara Corradin	Italy	43.63	42.61	40.08	43.63	
34	A	Ayra Valdivia	Peru	42.33	41.64	x	42.33	
35	B	Lee Yi-hua	Chinese Taipei	42.16	41.13	x	42.16	
36	B	Azize Altın	Turkey	x	38.44		38.44	
37	A	Aryna Dzemiashonak	Belarus	x	31.95	36.02	36.02	
	B	Anna Tarasiuk	Belarus	x	x	x	NM	
	B	Laura Paredes	Paraguay				DNS	

== Final ==
Rank	Name	Nationality	#1	#2	#3	#4	#5	#6	Result	Notes
1st place, gold medalist(s)	Mackenzie Little	Australia	57.29	48.06	51.74	54.84	61.47	54.39	61.47	CR
2nd place, silver medalist(s)	Yulenmis Aguilar	Cuba	53.96	51.14	53.86	54.63	59.94	55.07	59.94	PB
3rd place, bronze medalist(s)	Anete Kociņa	Latvia	54.26	52.41	x	52.67	x	52.84	54.26	
4	Réka Szilágyi	Hungary	47.00	46.87	51.95	x	50.15	54.24	54.24	
5	Eda Tuğsuz	Turkey	50.12	49.72	51.56	48.64	50.92	51.31	51.56	
6	Jo-Ané van Dyk	South Africa	46.38	49.33	50.16	x	47.52	48.47	50.16	
7	Lena Lilie	Germany	48.95	x	47.29	47.39	x	48.40	48.95	
8	Raimu Tanaka	Japan	45.75	48.71	x	42.59	42.06	48.28	48.71	
9	Kang Qiyan	China	46.75	x	48.67				48.67	
10	Fabienne Schönig	Germany	47.15	x	48.29				48.29	
11	Ilaria Casarotto	Italy	40.44	x	45.57				45.57	
12	Andrija Priedīte	Latvia	42.46	x	x				42.46	
