= 2014 World Junior Championships in Athletics – Women's javelin throw =

The women's javelin throw event at the 2014 World Junior Championships in Athletics was held in Eugene, Oregon, USA, at Hayward Field on 22 and 24 July.

== Medalists ==
Gold	Ekaterina Starygina; Russia
Silver	Sofi Flinck; Sweden
Bronze	Sara Kolak; Croatia

== Results ==
=== Final ===
24 July
Start time: 19:30 Temperature: 22 °C Humidity: 46 %
End time: 20:28 Temperature: 21 °C Humidity: 53 %

Rank	Name	Nationality	Attempts						Result	Notes
Rank	Name	Nationality	1	2	3	4	5	6	Result	Notes
1st place, gold medalist(s)	Ekaterina Starygina	Russia	54.62	55.98	x	x	55.00	56.85	56.85	SB
2nd place, silver medalist(s)	Sofi Flinck	Sweden	55.29	52.10	54.88	47.45	54.38	56.70	56.70	
3rd place, bronze medalist(s)	Sara Kolak	Croatia	52.65	53.03	55.66	x	x	55.74	55.74	
4	Marcelina Witek	Poland	49.14	54.14	53.39	49.76	53.39	52.22	54.14	
5	Maria Andrejczyk	Poland	53.66	53.63	53.00	52.23	48.29	50.13	53.66	
6	Christine Winkler	Germany	x	53.53	49.54	x	x	51.81	53.53	
7	Marie-Therese Obst	Norway	x	53.19	x	52.09	x	x	53.19	
8	Arantza Moreno	Spain	49.82	52.08	49.61	46.20	51.76	50.67	52.08	
9	Shiori Toma	Japan	50.07	49.42	50.72				50.72	
10	Edivania Araújo	Brazil	49.84	46.78	47.53				49.84	
11	Tereza Vytlačilová	Czech Republic	49.75	48.13	x				49.75	
12	Simona Dobilaitė	Lithuania	44.62	43.72	x				44.62	

=== Qualifications ===
22 July
With qualifying standard of 53.00 (Q) or at least the 12 best performers (q) advance to the Final

==== Summary ====
Rank	Name	Nationality	Result	Notes
1	Maria Andrejczyk	Poland	56.23	Q
2	Sofi Flinck	Sweden	56.04	Q
3	Marcelina Witek	Poland	55.78	Q
4	Ekaterina Starygina	Russia	54.80	Q
5	Tereza Vytlačilová	Czech Republic	53.06	Q
6	Christine Winkler	Germany	53.06	Q
7	Marie-Therese Obst	Norway	52.59	q
8	Simona Dobilaitė	Lithuania	52.43	q
9	Sara Kolak	Croatia	51.88	q
10	Arantza Moreno	Spain	51.67	q
11	Edivania Araújo	Brazil	51.64	q
12	Shiori Toma	Japan	51.64	q
13	Kiho Kuze	Japan	51.55	
14	Viktoriya Ermakova	Belarus	50.36	
15	Merly Cabrera	Colombia	50.19	
16	Megan Glasmann	United States	49.68	
17	Sigrid Borge	Norway	49.42	
18	Réka Szilágyi	Hungary	49.29	
19	Zhang Hongmei	China	49.29	
20	Angéla Moravcsik	Hungary	48.29	
21	Eda Tuğsuz	Turkey	48.19	
22	Anete Kociņa	Latvia	47.86	
23	Laura Melissa Paredes	Paraguay	47.50	
24	Rebekah Wales	United States	46.99	
25	Esra Gaz	Turkey	46.32	
25	Lee Geumhee	South Korea	46.32	
27	Katja Mihelič	Slovenia	46.26	
28	Mihaela Tacu	Moldova	45.12	
29	Megan Wilke	South Africa	43.57	
30	Margaux Nicollin	France	43.17	
31	Chang Chu	Chinese Taipei	42.82	
32	Chang Yiting	China	40.40	

==== Details ====
With qualifying standard of 53.00 (Q) or at least the 12 best performers (q) advance to the Final

===== Group A =====
24 July
Start time; 10:04 Temperature: 17 °C Humidity: 72 %
End time: 10:43 Temperature: 18 °C Humidity: 73 %

Rank	Name	Nationality	Attempts			Result	Notes
Rank	Name	Nationality	1	2	3	Result	Notes
1	Maria Andrejczyk	Poland	56.23			56.23	Q
2	Sofi Flinck	Sweden	56.04			56.04	Q
3	Tereza Vytlačilová	Czech Republic	41.93	49.81	53.06	53.06	Q
4	Marie-Therese Obst	Norway	51.52	50.14	52.59	52.59	q
5	Kiho Kuze	Japan	49.00	51.55	46.00	51.55	
6	Viktoriya Ermakova	Belarus	49.72	48.72	50.36	50.36	
7	Merly Cabrera	Colombia	43.76	x	50.19	50.19	
8	Réka Szilágyi	Hungary	46.46	48.48	49.29	49.29	
9	Eda Tuğsuz	Turkey	46.23	48.19	45.15	48.19	
10	Laura Melissa Paredes	Paraguay	39.94	47.50	46.08	47.50	
11	Rebekah Wales	United States	46.99	45.66	46.74	46.99	
12	Katja Mihelič	Slovenia	40.43	46.25	46.26	46.26	
13	Mihaela Tacu	Moldova	45.12	x	42.70	45.12	
14	Megan Wilke	South Africa	43.57	x	37.29	43.57	
15	Margaux Nicollin	France	x	x	43.17	43.17	
16	Chang Yiting	China	35.29	40.40	39.36	40.40	

===== Group B =====
24 July
Start time; 11:22 Temperature: 20 °C Humidity: 60 %
End time: 11:58 Temperature: 20 °C Humidity: 60 %

Rank	Name	Nationality	Attempts			Result	Notes
Rank	Name	Nationality	1	2	3	Result	Notes
1	Marcelina Witek	Poland	55.78			55.78	Q
2	Ekaterina Starygina	Russia	54.80			54.80	Q
3	Christine Winkler	Germany	48.18	53.06		53.06	Q
4	Simona Dobilaitė	Lithuania	44.79	52.43	x	52.43	q
5	Sara Kolak	Croatia	51.06	51.88	50.47	51.88	q
6	Arantza Moreno	Spain	51.67	50.18	48.20	51.67	q
7	Edivania Araújo	Brazil	51.64	51.11	49.63	51.64	q
8	Shiori Toma	Japan	48.94	51.64	48.20	51.64	q
9	Megan Glasmann	United States	49.68	47.82	45.20	49.68	
10	Sigrid Borge	Norway	44.37	45.66	49.42	49.42	
11	Zhang Hongmei	China	48.32	48.06	49.29	49.29	
12	Angéla Moravcsik	Hungary	48.29	46.95	46.11	48.29	
13	Anete Kociņa	Latvia	46.04	47.17	47.86	47.86	
14	Lee Geumhee	South Korea	46.32	x	x	46.32	
14	Esra Gaz	Turkey	46.32	x	x	46.32	
16	Chang Chu	Chinese Taipei	x	42.02	42.82	42.82	

== Participation ==
According to an unofficial count, 32 athletes from 25 countries participated in the event.

- Belarus (1)
- Brazil (1)
- China (2)
- Chinese Taipei (1)
- Colombia (1)
- Croatia (1)
- Czech Republic (1)
- France (1)
- Germany (1)
- Hungary (2)
- Japan (2)
- Latvia (1)
- Lithuania (1)
- Moldova (1)
- Norway (2)
- Paraguay (1)
- Poland (2)
- Russia (1)
- Slovenia (1)
- South Africa (1)
- South Korea (1)
- Spain (1)
- Sweden (1)
- Turkey (2)
- United States (2)
