= 2022 European Athletics Championships – Women's javelin throw =

Women's Javelin throw at the 2022 European Athletics Championships
- Venue: Olympiastadion
- Location: Munich
- Dates: 18 August (qualification); 20 August (final)
- Competitors: 23 from 18 nations
- Winning distance: 65.81

Medalists
gold medal	Elina Tzengko	Greece
silver medal	Adriana Vilagoš	Serbia
bronze medal	Barbora Špotáková	Czech Republic

The women's javelin throw at the 2022 European Athletics Championships took place at the Olympiastadion on 18 and 20 August.

== Records ==
Standing records prior to the 2022 European Athletics Championships
World record	Barbora Špotáková (CZE)	72.28 m	Stuttgart, Germany	13 September 2008
European record	Barbora Špotáková (CZE)	72.28 m	Stuttgart, Germany	13 September 2008
Championship record	Christin Hussong (GER)	67.90 m	Berlin, Germany	10 August 2018
World Leading	Kelsey-Lee Barber (AUS)	66.91 m	San Diego, United States	22 July 2022
Europe Leading	Tatsiana Khaladovich (BLR)	66.19 m	Brest, Belarus	13 July 2022

== Schedule ==
Date	Time	Round
18 August 2022	09:00	Qualification
20 August 2022	20:25	Final

All times are local times (UTC+2)

== Results ==
=== Qualification ===
Qualification: 61.00 m (Q) or best 12 performers (q)

Rank	Group	Name	Nationality	#1	#2	#3	Result	Note
1	A	Liveta Jasiūnaitė	Lithuania	56.12	61.85		61.85	Q
2	A	Elina Tzengko	Greece	57.20	61.28		61.28	Q
3	B	Barbora Špotáková	Czech Republic	56.36	60.75	–	60.75	q
4	B	Madara Palameika	Latvia	54.18	60.56	57.96	60.56	q, SB
5	A	Victoria Hudson	Austria	x	60.49	–	60.49	q
6	A	Annika Marie Fuchs	Germany	53.76	54.03	59.90	59.90	q
7	B	Martina Ratej	Slovenia	55.06	58.86	–	58.86	q, SB
8	B	Nikola Ogrodníková	Czech Republic	x	57.82	57.76	57.82	q
9	B	Adriana Vilagoš	Serbia	x	x	57.70	57.70	q
10	A	Līna Mūze	Latvia	56.60	56.67	57.69	57.69	q
11	A	Nikol Tabačková	Czech Republic	50.75	55.84	57.54	57.54	q
12	B	Réka Szilágyi	Hungary	53.45	57.40	x	57.40	q
13	A	Hanna Hatsko	Ukraine	54.22	57.39	55.20	57.39	
14	B	Sara Kolak	Croatia	57.31	x	x	57.31	
15	B	Eda Tuğsuz	Turkey	x	x	56.33	56.33	
16	B	Arantza Moreno	Spain	54.87	56.02	x	56.02	
17	B	Lea Wipper	Germany	51.51	53.58	55.07	55.07	
18	B	Gedly Tugi	Estonia	54.38	x	52.89	54.38	
19	A	Bekah Walton	Great Britain	54.20	49.53	49.67	54.20	
20	B	Sanne Erkkola	Finland	50.74	54.04	x	54.04	
21	B	Jana Marie Lowka	Germany	52.85	52.66	52.98	52.85	
22	B	Alizée Minard	France	49.75	x	52.50	52.50	
23	A	Anni-Linnea Alanen	Finland	50.24	52.09	51.81	52.09	

=== Final ===
Rank	Name	Nationality	#1	#2	#3	#4	#5	#6	Result	Note
1st place, gold medalist(s)	Elina Tzengko	Greece	60.82	65.81	–	59.40	x	64.57	65.81	PB
2nd place, silver medalist(s)	Adriana Vilagoš	Serbia	51.15	55.14	59.64	56.03	60.32	62.01	62.01	
3rd place, bronze medalist(s)	Barbora Špotáková	Czech Republic	59.04	60.31	x	x	59.99	60.68	60.68	
4	Réka Szilágyi	Hungary	52.28	60.57	55.14	x	56.29	57.29	60.57	SB
5	Martina Ratej	Slovenia	52.05	53.79	59.36	x	x	53.79	59.36	SB
6	Liveta Jasiūnaitė	Lithuania	57.39	58.73	56.53	58.95	x	x	58.95	
7	Līna Mūze	Latvia	54.33	58.11	56.83	57.69	x	55.02	58.11	
8	Nikol Tabačková	Czech Republic	51.84	51.65	57.93	x	x	x	57.93	
9	Madara Palameika	Latvia	56.55	x	x				56.55	
10	Victoria Hudson	Austria	56.07	x	x				56.07	
11	Annika Marie Fuchs	Germany	52.80	54.52	x				54.52	
12	Nikola Ogrodníková	Czech Republic	52.11	x	54.48				54.48	
