= 2017 European Athletics U23 Championships – Women's javelin throw =

The women's javelin throw event at the 2017 European Athletics U23 Championships was held in Bydgoszcz, Poland, at Zdzisław Krzyszkowiak Stadium on 15 and 16 July.

== Medalists ==
Gold	Sara Kolak; Croatia
Silver	Anete Kociņa; Latvia
Bronze	Marcelina Witek; Poland

== Results ==
=== Qualification ===
15 July

Qualification rule: 53.50 (Q) or the 12 best results (q) qualified for the final.

Rank	Group	Name	Nationality	#1	#2	#3	Results	Notes
1	A	Sara Kolak	Croatia	x	61.93		61.93	Q
2	A	Eda Tuğsuz	Turkey	61.81			61.81	Q
3	A	Anete Kociņa	Latvia	59.52			59.52	Q
4	A	Viktoriya Yarmakova	Belarus	49.48	59.35		59.35	Q, PB
5	A	Sigrid Borge	Norway	x	56.85		58.65	Q
6	A	Marcelina Witek	Poland	52.06	52.87	57.50	57.50	Q
7	B	Anna Tarasiuk	Belarus	50.37	x	56.85	56.85	Q, PB
8	A	Arantza Moreno	Spain	52.98	55.80		55.80	Q, SB
9	B	Klaudia Maruszewska	Poland	48.92	55.77		55.77	Q
10	B	Réka Szilágyi	Hungary	55.32			55.32	Q
11	B	Theodora Arabatzi	Greece	54.79			54.79	Q, PB
12	A	Christine Winkler	Germany	51.09	50.77	54.36	54.36	Q
13	A	Margaux Nicollin	France	53.88			53.88	Q
14	B	Gerli Israel	Estonia	47.44	49.77	51.66	51.66	
15	B	Vanja Spaić	Bosnia and Herzegovina	44.16	49.49	50.59	50.59	NU23R
16	B	Luisa Sinigaglia	Italy	49.97	46.28	46.97	49.97	
17	B	Nadia-Marie Pasternack	Switzerland	49.76	49.68	x	49.76	
18	A	Atina Kamasi	Serbia	41.42	49.37	47.65	49.37	
19	B	Kato Van Den Brulle	Belgium	43.93	48.74	42.91	48.74	
20	B	Saara Lipsanen	Finland	47.47	48.54	47.92	48.54	
21	B	Azize Altun	Turkey	48.04	47.61	44.48	48.04	
22	A	Paola Padovan	Italy	47.18	46.18	44.88	47.18	
23	A	Victoria Hudson	Austria	43.61	46.57	x	46.57	
24	A	Mirell Luik	Estonia	45.64	45.13	x	45.64	
25	B	Florina Andreea Necsoiu	Romania	x	x	41.77	41.77	
25	B	Ilaria Casarotto	Italy	x	x	38.88	38.88	
	A	Sofi Flink	Sweden	x	x	x	NM	
	B	Simona Dobilaitė	Lithuania	x	x	x	NM	

=== Final ===
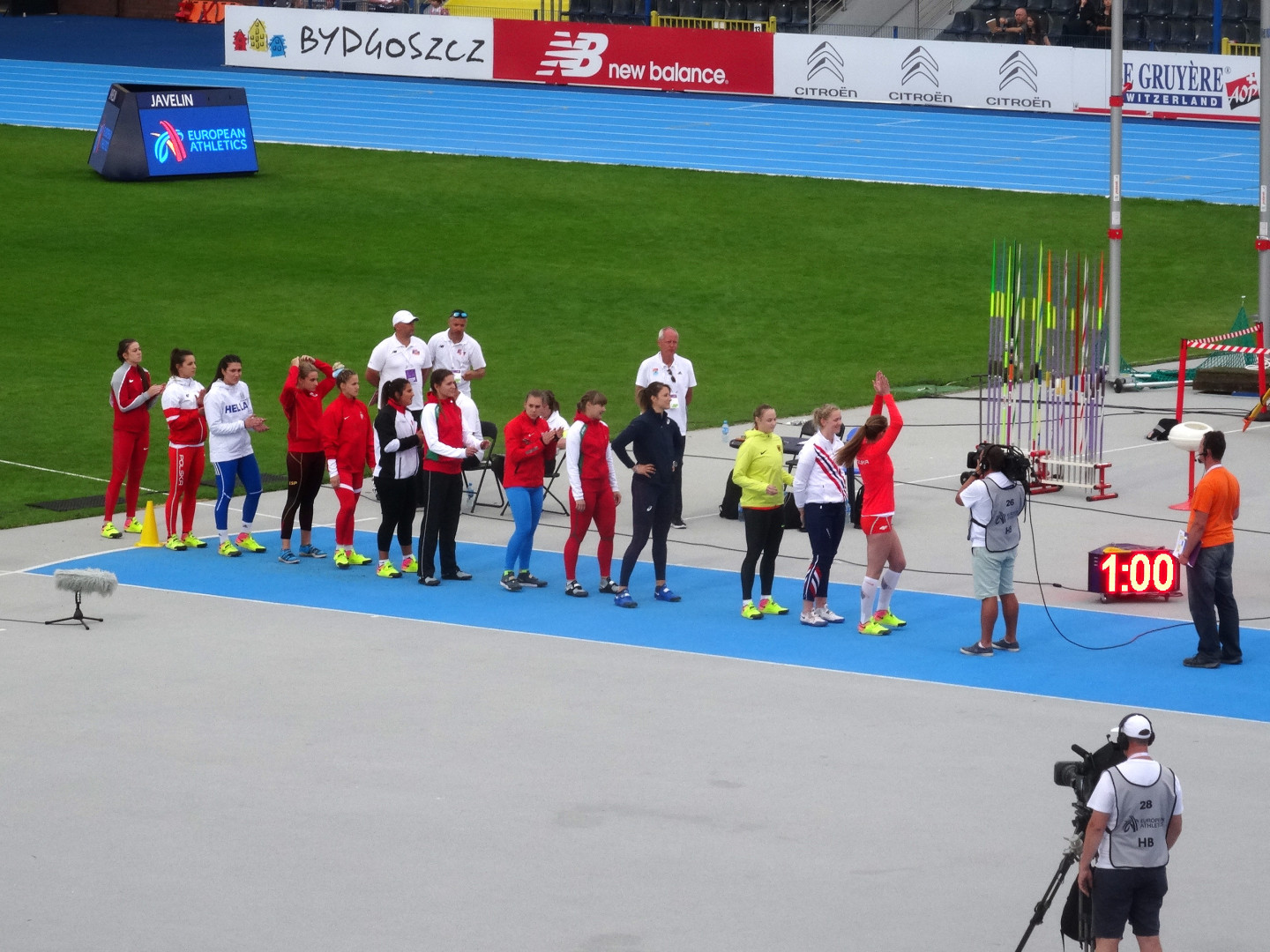
The finalists

15 July

Rank	Name	Nationality	#1	#2	#3	#4	#5	#6	Result	Notes
1st place, gold medalist(s)	Sara Kolak	Croatia	63.12	65.12	x	61.22	61.02	64.69	65.12	
2nd place, silver medalist(s)	Anete Kociņa	Latvia	59.16	58.13	62.38	x	x	64.47	64.47	PB
3rd place, bronze medalist(s)	Marcelina Witek	Poland	57.10	57.47	57.11	61.09	63.03	55.72	63.03	PB
4	Eda Tuğsuz	Turkey	53.24	x	62.37	61.68	x	58.86	62.37	
5	Sigrid Borge	Norway	60.44	x	58.92	57.01	58.68	x	60.44	
6	Anna Tarasiuk	Belarus	48.05	58.00	x	55.09	56.03	x	58.00	PB
7	Viktoriya Yarmakova	Belarus	57.31	57.46	54.35	55.58	57.87	57.03	57.87	
8	Margaux Nicollin	France	51.08	52.73	57.65	54.73	55.58	55.08	57.65	
9	Réka Szilágyi	Hungary	55.28	55.53	51.66				55.53	
10	Klaudia Maruszewska	Poland	55.11	x	x				55.11	
11	Arantza Moreno	Spain	49.73	54.50	54.65				54.65	
12	Christine Winkler	Germany	49.52	53.34	54.14				54.14	
13	Theodora Arabatzi	Greece	47.80	52.62	49.47				52.62	
