= Athletics at the 2017 Summer Universiade – Women's javelin throw =

The women's javelin throw event at the 2017 Summer Universiade was held on 23 and 25 August at the Taipei Municipal Stadium.

== Medalists ==
Gold	Silver	Bronze
Marcelina Witek; Poland	Marina Saito; Japan	Jenni Kangas; Finland

== Results ==
=== Qualification ===
Qualification: 58.00 m (Q) or at least 12 best (q) qualified for the final.

Rank	Group	Athlete	Nationality	#1	#2	#3	Result	Notes
1	A	Christin Hussong	Germany	60.18			60.18	Q
2	B	Haruka Kitaguchi	Japan	51.15	52.03	57.96	57.96	q
3	A	Anete Kociņa	Latvia	57.85	x	54.08	57.85	q
4	B	Marcelina Witek	Poland	53.95	52.32	57.71	57.71	q
5	B	Liveta Jasiūnaitė	Lithuania	55.41	52.74	57.43	57.43	q
6	B	Su Lingdan	China	49.22	50.28	57.38	57.38	q
7	A	Marina Saito	Japan	57.24	55.40	57.11	57.24	q
8	A	Réka Szilágyi	Hungary	55.48	x	x	55.48	q
9	A	Jenni Kangas	Finland	55.00	50.34	55.12	55.12	q
10	A	Jo-Ane van Dyk	South Africa	54.44	53.34	54.55	54.55	q
11	B	Irena Šedivá	Czech Republic	54.25	54.09	51.53	54.25	q
12	B	Gundega Grīva	Latvia	48.72	51.31	54.14	54.14	q, SB
13	A	Eda Tuğsuz	Turkey	x	51.85	53.29	53.29	
14	B	Margaux Nicollin	France	47.27	x	53.07	53.07	
15	B	Kathryn Brooks	Australia	46.97	45.53	52.65	52.65	
16	A	Mackenzie Little	Australia	48.17	52.09	x	52.09	
17	B	Heidi Nokelainen	Finland	51.95	50.61	47.43	51.95	
18	A	Andrea Bolle	Norway	51.91	x	47.98	51.91	
19	A	Daniella Lorenzon	Brazil	44.96	51.51	51.77	51.77	
20	B	Rafaela Gonçalves	Brazil	48.34	51.18	45.39	51.18	
21	B	Bernarda Letnar	Slovenia	50.58	x	49.35	50.58	
22	A	Victoria Hudson	Austria	47.82	49.35	47.67	49.35	
23	B	Annabella Bogdan	Hungary	49.16	x	47.94	49.16	
24	A	Victoria Peeters	New Zealand	44.57	48.50	x	48.50	
25	A	Ashley Pryke	Canada	48.41	x	x	48.41	
26	B	Varvara Nazarova	Kazakhstan	48.24	47.62	x	48.24	
27	A	Li Hui-jun	Chinese Taipei	47.82	x	x	47.82	
28	A	Marie Vestergaard	Denmark	40.93	47.42	46.77	47.42	
29	B	Jaimee Springer	Canada	43.32	x	45.61	45.61	
30	A	Laura Tšernova	Estonia	40.62	x	39.05	40.62	
31	B	Piyumi Henapola	Sri Lanka	33.41	34.89	35.92	35.92	
32	A	Ghazala Siddique	Pakistan	x	29.90	x	29.90	
	B	Chang Chu	Chinese Taipei				DNS	

=== Final ===
Rank	Name	Nationality	#1	#2	#3	#4	#5	#6	Result	Notes
1st place, gold medalist(s)	Marcelina Witek	Poland	51.10	56.94	59.45	x	63.31	61.39	63.31	PB
2nd place, silver medalist(s)	Marina Saito	Japan	57.91	61.06	52.73	51.67	x	62.37	62.37	PB
3rd place, bronze medalist(s)	Jenni Kangas	Finland	60.98	58.44	56.13	x	55.31	53.84	60.98	PB
4	Eda Tuğsuz	Turkey	60.75	x	x	x	56.82	60.50	60.75	
5	Christin Hussong	Germany	58.44	59.78	60.56	x	57.41	60.59	60.59	
6	Anete Kociņa	Latvia	55.83	55.76	58.49	57.10	x	57.90	58.49	
7	Liveta Jasiūnaitė	Lithuania	55.33	52.40	57.25	x	x	x	57.25	
8	Su Lingdan	China	57.20	56.32	56.31	x	52.35	54.07	57.20	
9	Jo-Ane van Dyk	South Africa	57.02	55.54	54.43				57.02	SB
10	Haruka Kitaguchi	Japan	54.32	55.19	56.30				56.30	
11	Irena Šedivá	Czech Republic	53.01	56.24	x				56.24	
12	Gundega Grīva	Latvia	50.25	47.63	52.98				52.98	
13	Réka Szilágyi	Hungary	50.53	52.54	48.98				52.54	
