= 2012 World Junior Championships in Athletics – Women's javelin throw =

The women's javelin throw at the 2012 World Junior Championships in Athletics was held at the Estadi Olímpic Lluís Companys on 10 and 11 July.

== Medalists ==
Gold	Sofi Flinck; Sweden
Silver	Liu Shiying; China
Bronze	Marija Vucenovic; Serbia

== Records ==
Prior to the competition, the existing world junior and championship records were as follows.

World Junior Record	Vira Rebryk (UKR)	63.01 m	Bydgoszcz, Poland	10 July 2008
Championship Record	Vira Rebryk (UKR)	63.01 m	Bydgoszcz, Poland	10 July 2008
World Junior Leading	Liu Shiying (CHN)	57.52 m	Changzhou, China	20 April 2012
Broken records during the 2012 World Junior Championships in Athletics
World Junior Leading	Sofi Flinck (SWE)	61.40	Barcelona, Spain	11 July 2012

== Results ==
=== Qualification ===
Qualification: Standard 54.00 m (Q) or at least best 12 qualified (q)

Rank	Group	Name	Nationality	#1	#2	#3	Result	Note
1	B	Liu Shiying	China	58.47			58.47	Q, WJL
2	B	Sofi Flinck	Sweden	58.16			58.16	Q, NJ, NR
3	A	Ingeborg Svendrup Rønningen	Norway	44.46	52.71	x	52.71	q
4	B	Lismania Muñoz	Cuba	x	50.39	52.70	52.70	q
5	B	Liveta Jasiunaite	Lithuania	52.67	49.21	47.49	52.67	q
6	A	Christin Hussong	Germany	49.95	52.54	49.97	52.54	q
7	A	Marija Vučenović	Serbia	50.59	48.02	52.49	52.49	q
8	B	Karolina Bołdysz	Poland	52.35	45.90	x	52.35	q
9	A	Ismaray Armentero	Cuba	x	51.52	x	51.52	q
10	A	Wasie Toolis	Australia	50.23	47.78	51.38	51.38	q, PB
11	B	Haley Crouser	United States	51.04	50.45	47.06	51.04	q
12	B	Eva Vivod	Slovenia	46.89	50.79	48.18	50.79	q, PB
13	A	Alexie Alaïs	France	46.80	49.86	50.52	50.52	
14	A	Daliadiz Ortiz	Puerto Rico	x	48.34	50.44	50.44	
15	A	Lidia Parada	Spain	50.33	48.64	47.12	50.33	
16	B	Charlotte Müller	Germany	47.66	47.90	50.30	50.30	
17	B	Salina Fässler	Switzerland	49.95	x	x	49.95	PB
18	B	Tetyana Fetiskina	Ukraine	47.31	45.66	49.78	49.78	
19	A	Daniella Mieko Nisimura	Brazil	36.17	49.47	49.72	49.72	PB
20	A	Valeria Lungu	Moldova	44.46	48.94	46.32	48.94	
21	A	Kateryna Derun	Ukraine	47.07	x	48.69	48.69	
22	B	Monique Cilione	Australia	44.88	45.31	48.30	48.30	
23	B	Sara Kolak	Croatia	44.40	48.15	x	48.15	
24	A	Noémie Pleimling	Luxembourg	x	x	47.90	47.90	
25	A	Nathalie Meier	Switzerland	46.36	45.62	47.82	47.82	
26	A	Brianna Bain	United States	47.64	x	47.17	47.64	
27	B	Niki Oudenaarden	Canada	39.64	47.35	43.51	47.35	
28	B	Margaux Nicollin	France	43.49	46.80	x	46.80	
29	B	Katrina Sirma	Latvia	46.73	42.74	36.89	46.73	
30	B	Hiroko Takigawa	Japan	46.13	x	x	46.13	
31	A	Kiho Kuze	Japan	45.29	43.93	44.99	45.29	
32	A	Hyojeong Heo	South Korea	42.40	x	44.63	44.63	
33	B	Maria Børstad Jenssen	Norway	43.73	44.62	44.50	44.62	
34	A	Katja Zof	Slovenia	44.53	42.11	44.29	44.53	

=== Final ===
Rank	Name	Nationality	#1	#2	#3	#4	#5	#6	Result	Note
1st place, gold medalist(s)	Sofi Flinck	Sweden	56.09	55.22	55.59	53.91	56.71	61.40	61.40	WJL
2nd place, silver medalist(s)	Liu Shiying	China	54.77	59.20	X	X	–	–	59.20	PB
3rd place, bronze medalist(s)	Marija Vučenović	Serbia	X	49.49	57.12	X	X	X	57.12	PB
4	Lismania Muñoz	Cuba	52.55	52.91	54.97	51.95	52.82	52.74	54.97	
5	Karolina Bołdysz	Poland	53.51	53.55	50.43	52.97	51.43	54.95	54.95	
6	Ismaray Armentero	Cuba	52.51	54.54	53.22	52.39	50.00	52.54	54.54	
7	Christin Hussong	Germany	50.56	50.66	50.24	52.06	49.26	53.20	53.20	
8	Liveta Jasiunaite	Lithuania	53.00	51.09	51.85	50.22	49.74	52.65	53.00	
9	Wasie Toolis	Australia	48.55	50.16	49.07				50.16	
10	Eva Vivod	Slovenia	49.17	49.55	X				49.55	
11	Haley Crouser	United States	X	X	49.22				49.22	
12	Ingeborg Svendrup Rønningen	Norway	47.44	47.51	X				47.51	

== Participation ==
According to an unofficial count, 34 athletes from 24 countries participated in the event.

- Australia (2)
- Brazil (1)
- Canada (1)
- China (1)
- Croatia (1)
- Cuba (2)
- France (2)
- Germany (2)
- Japan (2)
- Latvia (1)
- Lithuania (1)
- Luxembourg (1)
- Moldova (1)
- Norway (2)
- Poland (1)
- Puerto Rico (1)
- Serbia (1)
- Slovenia (2)
- South Korea (1)
- Spain (1)
- Sweden (1)
- Switzerland (2)
- Ukraine (2)
- United States (2)
