= Liu Shiying (athlete) =

Chinese javelin thrower (born 1993)

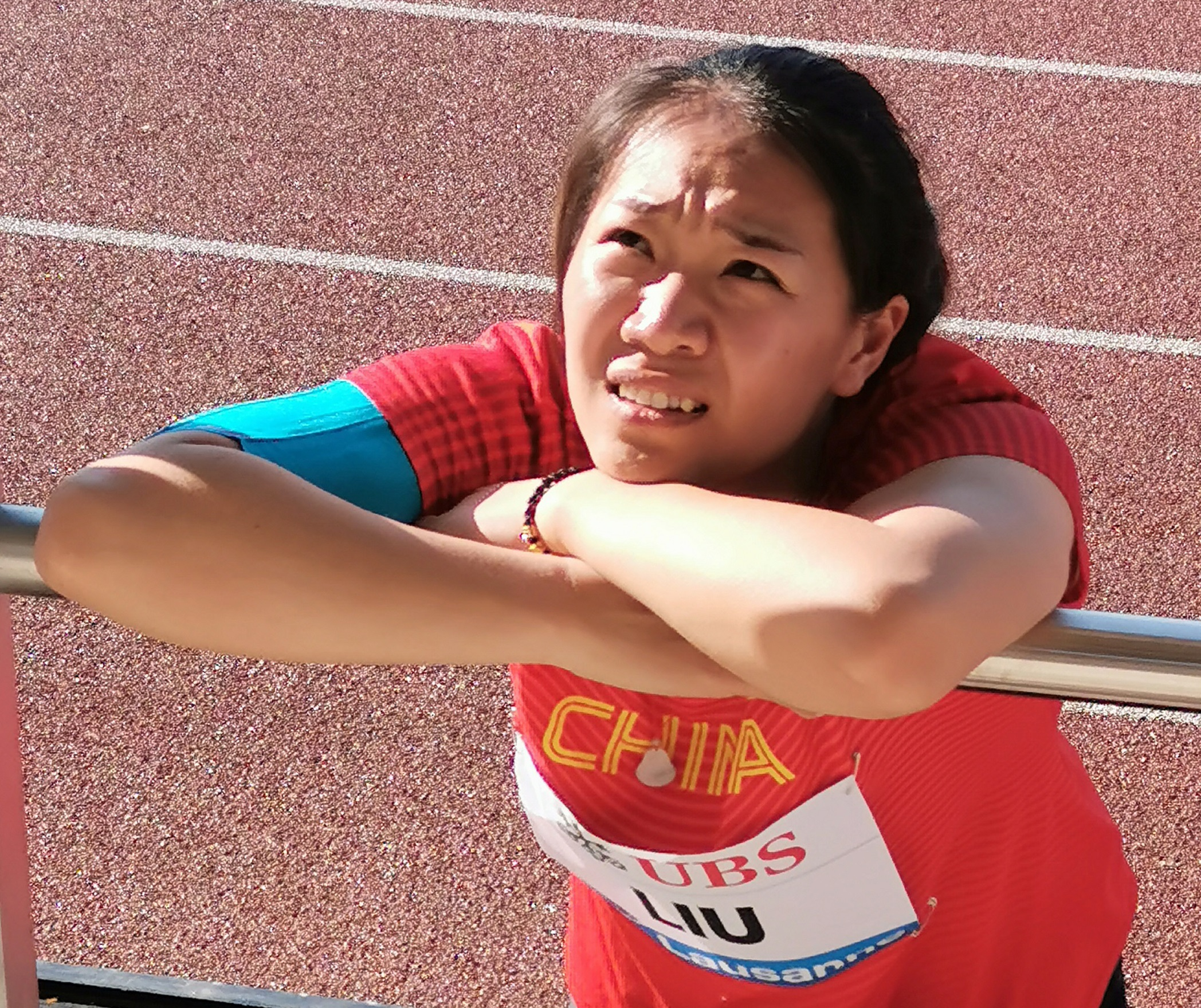
- Liu at the 2019 Athletissima meet

Personal information
- Nationality: Chinese
- Born: September 24, 1993 (age 33) Muping County, Yantai, Shandong
- Height: 1.79 m (5 ft 10 in)
- Weight: 76 kg (168 lb)

Sport
- Country: China
- Sport: Athletics
- Event: Javelin throw
Medal record
Olympic Games
Gold medal – first place	2020 Tokyo	Javelin throw
World Championships
Silver medal – second place	2019 Doha	Javelin throw
Asian Games
Gold medal – first place	2018 Jakarta	Javelin throw
Asian Athletics Championships
Gold medal – first place	2015 Wuhan	Javelin throw
Silver medal – second place	2023 Bangkok	Javelin throw

Liu Shiying (Chinese: 刘诗颖; born 24 September 1993) is a Chinese athlete who competes in the javelin throw. She is the first Asian athlete to win an Olympic gold medal in women's javelin throw.

== Career ==
Born in Muping County, Yantai, Shandong Province, Liu competed in track and field as a teenager and came to prominence nationally with a win at the Chinese City Games. A win at the national junior championships in 2012 saw her rise to the top of the world junior rankings with a personal best of 57.52 m (188 ft 8 in).

She entered the 2012 World Junior Championships in Athletics as the leading athlete and improved her best to 58.47 m (191 ft 9 in) in the qualifying round. She improved again to 59.20 m (194 ft 2 in) in the final and led until the final round when Sweden's Sofi Flinck had a large personal best to knock Liu into the silver medal position. She had won a gold medal herself at the 2012 Asian Junior Athletics Championships a month earlier.

Liu made a gradual progression into the senior ranks. She was sixth at the 2012 Chinese Athletics Championships, then improved to fourth behind Chang Chunfeng at the 12th Chinese National Games in 2013 with a personal best of 60.23 m (197 ft 7 in) – her first throw beyond sixty metres. She did not compete at a major event in 2014, but a new best throw of 62.72 m (205 ft 9 in) gave her her highest world ranking yet at 21st (behind only Asian Games winner Zhang Li among Asian women).

She established herself internationally with a win at the 2015 Asian Athletics Championships, taking the gold medal for China in a championship record of 61.33 m (201 ft 2 in) (beating the mark set by her compatriot Li Lingwei in 2013).

On 6 August 2021, she won the gold medal in women's javelin throw at 2020 Summer Olympics in Tokyo with 66.34 m (217 ft 7 in), thereby becoming the first Asian to win an Olympic gold medal in women's javelin throw and the second Chinese athlete to be crowned the Olympic champion in any field event.

On 23 September 2021, she won the gold medal in women's javelin throw at the 2021 National Games of China in Shaanxi with 64.33 metres.

== International competitions ==
Year	Competition	Venue	Position	Notes
2012	World Junior Championships	Barcelona, Spain	2nd	59.20
2012	Asian Junior Championships	Colombo, Sri Lanka	1st	53.02
2015	Asian Championships	Wuhan, China	1st	61.33 CR
2016	Olympic Games	Rio de Janeiro, Brazil	23rd (q)	57.16
2017	World Championships	London, United Kingdom	8th	62.84
2018	Asian Games	Jakarta, Indonesia	1st	66.09
2019	World Championships	Doha, Qatar	2nd	65.88 m
2021	Olympic Games	Tokyo, Japan	1st	66.34 m
2022	World Championships	Eugene, United States	4th	63.25 m
2023	Asian Championships	Bangkok, Thailand	2nd	61.51 m
2023	World Championships	Budapest, Hungary	6th	61.66 m
2023	Asian Games	Hangzhou, China	5th	57.62 m

== Seasonal bests ==
View chart definition.
- 2018: 67.12 m (220 ft 2 1/2 in)
- 2017: 66.47 m (218 ft 3/4 in)
- 2016: 65.64 m (215 ft 4 1/4 in)
- 2015: 62.77 m (205 ft 11 1/4 in)
- 2014: 62.72 m (205 ft 9 1/4 in)
- 2013: 60.23 m (197 ft 7 1/4 in)
- 2012: 59.20 m (194 ft 2 1/2 in)
- 2011: 55.10 m (180 ft 9 1/4 in)
- 2010: 50.92 m (167 ft 1/2 in)

All information from IAAF profile
