= 2024 European Athletics Championships – Women's javelin throw =

Women's javelin throw at the 2024 European Athletics Championships
- Venue: Stadio Olimpico
- Location: Rome
- Dates: 10 June (qualification); 11 June (final)
- Competitors: 30 from 17 nations
- Winning distance: 64.62 m

Medalists
gold medal	Victoria Hudson	Austria
silver medal	Adriana Vilagoš	Serbia
bronze medal	Marie-Therese Obst	Norway

The women's javelin throw at the 2024 European Athletics Championships took place at the Stadio Olimpico on 10 and 11 June.

== Records ==
Standing records prior to the 2024 European Athletics Championships
World record	Barbora Špotáková (CZE)	72.28 m	Stuttgart, Germany	13 September 2008
European record	Barbora Špotáková (CZE)	72.28 m	Stuttgart, Germany	13 September 2008
Championship record	Christin Hussong (GER)	67.90 m	Berlin, Germany	10 August 2018
World Leading	Flor Ruiz (COL)	66.70 m	Cuiaba, Brazil	12 May 2024
Europe Leading	Victoria Hudson (AUT)	66.06 m	Eisenstadt, Austria	22 May 2024

== Schedule ==
Date	Time	Round
10 June 2024	10:25	Qualification
11 June 2024	21:36	Final

All times are local times (UTC+2)

== Results ==
=== Qualification ===
Qualification: 60.50 m (Q) or best 12 performers (q).

Rank	Group	Name	Nationality	#1	#2	#3	Result	Note
1	A	Marie-Therese Obst	Norway	61.45			61.45	Q
2	B	Maria Andrejczyk	Poland	57.76	60.61		60.61	Q
3	A	Adriana Vilagoš	Serbia	60.57			60.57	Q
4	B	Elina Tzengko	Greece	60.48	–	–	60.48	q, SB
5	A	Victoria Hudson	Austria	58.73	60.15	x	60.15	q
6	B	Marija Vučenović	Serbia	53.00	54.00	59.90	59.90	q, SB
7	A	Nikola Ogrodníková	Czech Republic	54.12	58.52	x	58.52	q
8	B	Līna Mūze	Latvia	58.42	56.33	x	58.42	q
9	A	Christin Hussong	Germany	58.21	56.81	56.88	58.21	q
10	A	Sara Kolak	Croatia	56.60	57.52	57.73	57.73	q
11	A	Marcelina Witek	Poland	57.73	x	x	57.73	q
12	A	Anete Sietiņa	Latvia	53.32	56.19	57.71	57.71	q
13	B	Yulenmis Aguilar	Spain	54.89	57.27	x	57.27	
14	B	Sigrid Borge	Norway	56.44	x	55.95	56.44	
15	B	Gedly Tugi	Estonia	x	x	56.43	56.43	
16	A	Martina Ratej	Slovenia	54.47	56.34	52.10	56.34	SB
17	B	Liveta Jasiūnaitė	Lithuania	55.20	55.85	x	55.85	
18	B	Andrea Železná	Czech Republic	52.11	48.20	55.57	55.57	
19	A	Angéla Diósi-Moravcsik	Hungary	54.43	51.61	50.74	54.43	SB
20	B	Eda Tuğsuz	Turkey	53.29	x	52.42	53.29	
21	B	Anni-Linnea Alanen	Finland	50.25	53.03	49.18	53.03	
22	A	Federica Botter	Italy	51.10	x	52.99	52.99	
23	B	Annabella Bogdán	Hungary	51.69	52.91	52.06	52.91	
24	A	Petra Sičaková	Czech Republic	50.99	52.86	51.49	52.86	
25	B	Lucija Cvitanović	Croatia	49.18	52.66	51.86	52.66	
26	B	Jana Marie Lowka	Germany	x	52.54	51.62	52.54	
27	B	Jatta-Mari Jääskeläinen	Finland	48.87	52.50	51.96	52.50	
28	A	Esra Türkmen	Turkey	52.05	49.80	48.72	52.05	
29	A	Sanne Erkkola	Finland	47.92	47.20	51.36	51.36	
30	A	Ivana Đurić	Serbia	50.23	49.96	x	50.23	

=== Final ===
The final was started on 11 June at 21:36.

Rank	Name	Nationality	#1	#2	#3	#4	#5	#6	Result	Note
1st place, gold medalist(s)	Victoria Hudson	Austria	64.62	60.35	x	61.75	62.74	59.55	64.62	
2nd place, silver medalist(s)	Adriana Vilagoš	Serbia	58.16	58.09	64.42	57.96	57.16	55.91	64.42	EU23L, NR
3rd place, bronze medalist(s)	Marie-Therese Obst	Norway	58.89	59.90	63.50	60.28	59.40	x	63.50	PB
4	Christin Hussong	Germany	61.92	x	59.07	57.40	x	58.43	61.92	SB
5	Nikola Ogrodníková	Czech Republic	55.60	x	58.94	61.78	57.24	59.18	61.78	SB
6	Elina Tzengko	Greece	54.46	59.46	54.03	x	x	x	59.46	
7	Anete Sietiņa	Latvia	x	58.72	x	x	x	59.34	59.34	
8	Līna Mūze	Latvia	55.84	58.58	x	55.89	x	–	58.58	
9	Marija Vučenović	Serbia	x	58.30	57.12				58.30	
10	Maria Andrejczyk	Poland	58.29	55.73	x				58.29	
11	Sara Kolak	Croatia	x	x	55.90				55.90	
12	Marcelina Witek	Poland	54.92	52.57	55.42				55.42	
