= Sigrid Borge =

Norwegian javelin thrower (born 1995)

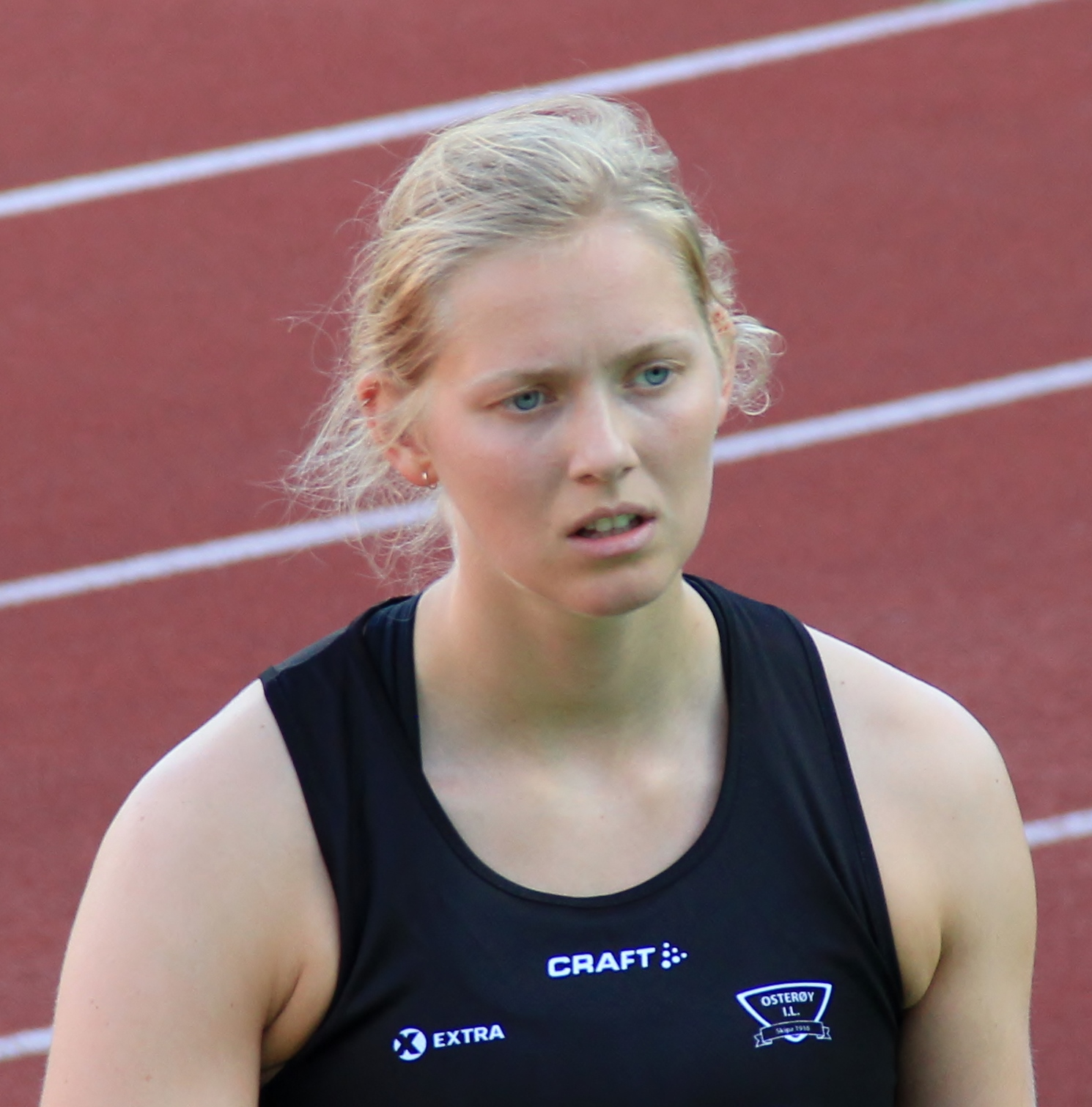
- Borge in 2018

Personal information
- Born: 3 December 1995 (age 30) Hausvik, Norway
- Height: 1.81 m (5 ft 11 in)
- Weight: 82 kg (181 lb)

Sport
- Sport: Athletics
- Event: Javelin throw
- Club: IK Tjalve

Achievements and titles
- Personal best: JT: 63.28 m (2017)
Medal record
Women's athletics
Representing Norway
European Throwing Cup
Silver medal – second place	2025 Nicosia	Javelin Throw
Nordic Junior Championships
Gold medal – first place	2014 Kristiansand	Javelin throw
Bronze medal – third place	2013 Espoo	Javelin throw

Sigrid Borge (born 3 December 1995 in Hausvik) is a Norwegian athlete specialising in the javelin throw. She is a European Throwing Cup silver medallist and five-time Norwegian national champion in the javelin event. Borge is also a Nordic Junior Championships gold and bronze medallist.

Her personal best throw is 63.28 metres, set at Nadderud Stadion in 2017.

== International competitions ==
Year	Competition	Venue	Position	Notes
Representing Norway
2013	European Junior Championships	Rieti, Italy	21st (q)	44.92 m
2014	World Junior Championships	Eugene, United States	17th (q)	49.42 m
2015	European U23 Championships	Tallinn, Estonia	4th	55.72 m
2016	European Throwing Cup (U23)	Arad, Romania	1st	59.33 m
2016	European Championships	Amsterdam, Netherlands	19th (q)	56.30 m
2017	European Throwing Cup (U23)	Las Palmas, Spain	3rd	56.65 m
2017	European U23 Championships	Bydgoszcz, Poland	5th	60.44 m
2017	World Championships	London, United Kingdom	27th (q)	55.08 m
2018	European Championships	Berlin, Germany	8th	59.60 m
2023	World Championships	Budapest, Hungary	34th (q)	53.34 m
2024	European Championships	Rome, Italy	14th (q)	56.44 m
2026	European Championships	Birmingham, United Kingdom	4th	59.98 m
2026	World Ultimate Championship	Budapest, Hungary	8th	50.88 m
