= Athletics at the 2016 Summer Olympics – Women's javelin throw =

Women's javelin throw at the Games of the XXXI Olympiad
- Venue: Olympic Stadium
- Date: 16–18 August 2016
- Competitors: 31 from 20 nations
- Winning distance: 66.18 m NR

Medalists
1st place, gold medalist(s)		Sara Kolak	Croatia
2nd place, silver medalist(s)		Sunette Viljoen	South Africa
3rd place, bronze medalist(s)		Barbora Špotáková	Czech Republic

Official Video Highlights

The women's javelin throw competition at the 2016 Summer Olympics in Rio de Janeiro, Brazil was held at the Olympic Stadium on 16–18 August. Each athlete received three throws in the qualifying round. All who achieved the qualifying distance progressed to the final. Each finalist was allowed three throws in last round, with the top eight athletes after that point being given three further attempts.

== Summary ==
In the qualifying round, Maria Andrejczyk threw a Polish national record 67.11m, moving her to the # 16 thrower of all time. Of course, several women on that same list also qualified for the final, including world record holder and 2016 non-Russian world leader Barbora Špotáková. Vera Rebrik had thrown 67.30 in February, but Russia was on suspension.

Flor Ruiz started the final round with a 61.54 m. Two throws later Tatsiana Khaladovich raised the stakes to 62.68 m. Two throws later Andrejczyk displaced Ruiz with a 61.92. Sunette Viljoen moved on top with a 64.92 m. Near the top of the second round, Kathryn Mitchell almost matched it with a 64.36 to move into silver position. 2015 World silver medalist Lü Huihui moved into bronze position with a 63.50 m that lasted until the end of the round when two-time defending champion Špotáková moved into the bronze position with a 63.73 m. Khaladovich came back in the third round with a 64.60 m to move into the silver spot. After the field dropped off returning bronze medalist Linda Stahl, 21 year old Sara Kolak threw 66.18 m (217 ft 1 in) to rocket from sixth to first. As second thrower in the fifth round, Andrejczyk threw 64.78 m to leapfrog from seventh to bronze medal position. That only lasted a few throwers until Špotáková threw 2 cm further.

For Kolak, whose previous medal collection included the bronze medal from the 2016 European Championships, it was a new Croatian National Record, beating the 64.30 m she set in qualifying, which beat the 63.50 she threw winning the European bronze. Prior to 2016, her best was still the national record, but was a 57.79 from 2013, improving 8.39 m (27 ft 6 in) in just 5 months. Kolak moved into the #20 position on the all-time list.

The following evening the medals were presented by Li Lingwei, IOC member, China and Alberto Juantorena, Vice President of the IAAF.

== Schedule ==
All times are Brasília Time (UTC−3).

Date	Time	Round
Tuesday, 16 August 2016	20:35	Qualifications
Thursday, 18 August 2016	21:10	Finals

== Records ==
Prior to the competition, the existing world record, Olympic record, and world leading mark were as follows:

World record	Barbora Špotáková (CZE)	72.28 m	Stuttgart, Germany	13 September 2008
Olympic record	Osleidys Menéndez (CUB)	71.53 m	Athens, Greece	27 August 2004
World leading	Vera Rebrik (RUS)	67.30 m	Sochi, Russia	19 February 2016

The following national records were established during the competition:

Country	Athlete	Round	Distance	Notes
Poland	Maria Andrejczyk (POL)	Qualifying	67.11 m	
Croatia	Sara Kolak (CRO)	Qualifying	64.30 m	
Croatia	Sara Kolak (CRO)	Final	66.18 m	

== Results ==
=== Qualifying round ===
Qualification rule: qualification standard 63.00m (Q) or at least best 12 qualified (q).

Rank	Group	Name	Nationality	#1	#2	#3	Result	Notes
1	B	Maria Andrejczyk	Poland	67.11			67.11	Q, NR
2	B	Barbora Špotáková	Czech Republic	62.50	64.65		64.65	Q
3	A	Sara Kolak	Croatia	55.68	55.86	64.30	64.30	Q, NR
4	B	Linda Stahl	Germany	63.95			63.95	Q
5	A	Tatsiana Khaladovich	Belarus	63.78			63.78	Q
6	A	Sunette Viljoen	South Africa	63.54			63.54	Q
7	A	Lü Huihui	China	63.28			63.28	Q
8	B	Madara Palameika	Latvia	63.03			63.03	Q
9	A	Flor Ruiz	Colombia	62.32	59.89	59.99	62.32	q
10	A	Christina Obergföll	Germany	57.75	62.18	x	62.18	q
11	A	Christin Hussong	Germany	56.19	55.58	62.17	62.17	q
12	B	Kathryn Mitchell	Australia	x	60.05	61.63	61.63	q
13	B	Kara Winger	United States	61.02	57.34	60.54	61.02	
14	A	Sinta Ozoliņa-Kovala	Latvia	60.92	58.08	x	60.92	
15	B	Li Lingwei	China	60.91	59.30	57.87	60.91	
16	A	Elizabeth Gleadle	Canada	59.18	60.28	58.74	60.28	
17	B	Kateryna Derun	Ukraine	60.02	54.86	x	60.02	
18	A	Martina Ratej	Slovenia	59.76	58.15	x	59.76	
19	A	Hanna Hatsko-Fedusova	Ukraine	58.90	x	58.38	58.90	
20	B	Liina Laasma	Estonia	58.06	56.21	56.62	58.06	
21	B	Yuki Ebihara	Japan	53.75	55.89	57.68	57.68	
22	A	Kim Mickle	Australia	57.20	x	55.93	57.20	
23	A	Liu Shiying	China	57.16	55.60	x	57.16	
24	B	Mathilde Andraud	France	56.61	56.01	56.13	56.61	
25	A	Maggie Malone	United States	56.47	x	46.87	56.47	
26	B	Tatsiana Korzh	Belarus	49.41	53.54	56.16	56.16	
27	A	Brittany Borman	United States	54.15	56.04	52.73	56.04	
28	B	Kelsey-Lee Roberts	Australia	44.75	55.04	55.25	55.25	
29	A	Yulenmis Aguilar	Cuba	54.84	x	54.94	54.94	
30	B	Ásdís Hjálmsdóttir	Iceland	x	54.92	x	54.92	
31	B	Sanni Utriainen	Finland	53.42	x	52.45	53.42	

=== Final ===
Rank	Athlete	Nationality	#1	#2	#3	#4	#5	#6	Result	Notes
1st place, gold medalist(s)	Sara Kolak	Croatia	60.89	62.95	63.00	66.18	x	59.42	66.18	NR
2nd place, silver medalist(s)	Sunette Viljoen	South Africa	64.92	61.04	x	63.00	x	x	64.92	
3rd place, bronze medalist(s)	Barbora Špotáková	Czech Republic	60.16	63.73	x	61.25	64.80	x	64.80	
4	Maria Andrejczyk	Poland	61.92	59.25	60.23	59.31	64.78	63.69	64.78	
5	Tatsiana Khaladovich	Belarus	62.68	60.24	64.60	60.49	63.52	64.24	64.60	
6	Kathryn Mitchell	Australia	x	64.36	x	x	62.20	63.02	64.36	
7	Lü Huihui	China	60.32	63.50	59.56	64.04	x	56.96	64.04	SB
8	Christina Obergföll	Germany	60.17	62.28	x	x	x	62.92	62.92	
9	Flor Ruiz	Colombia	61.54	58.46	59.61	did not advance			61.54	
10	Madara Palameika	Latvia	x	x	60.14	did not advance			60.14	
11	Linda Stahl	Germany	58.48	x	59.71	did not advance			59.71	
12	Christin Hussong	Germany	54.99	54.47	57.70	did not advance			57.70	
