= Sara Kolak =

Croatian javelin thrower (born 1995)

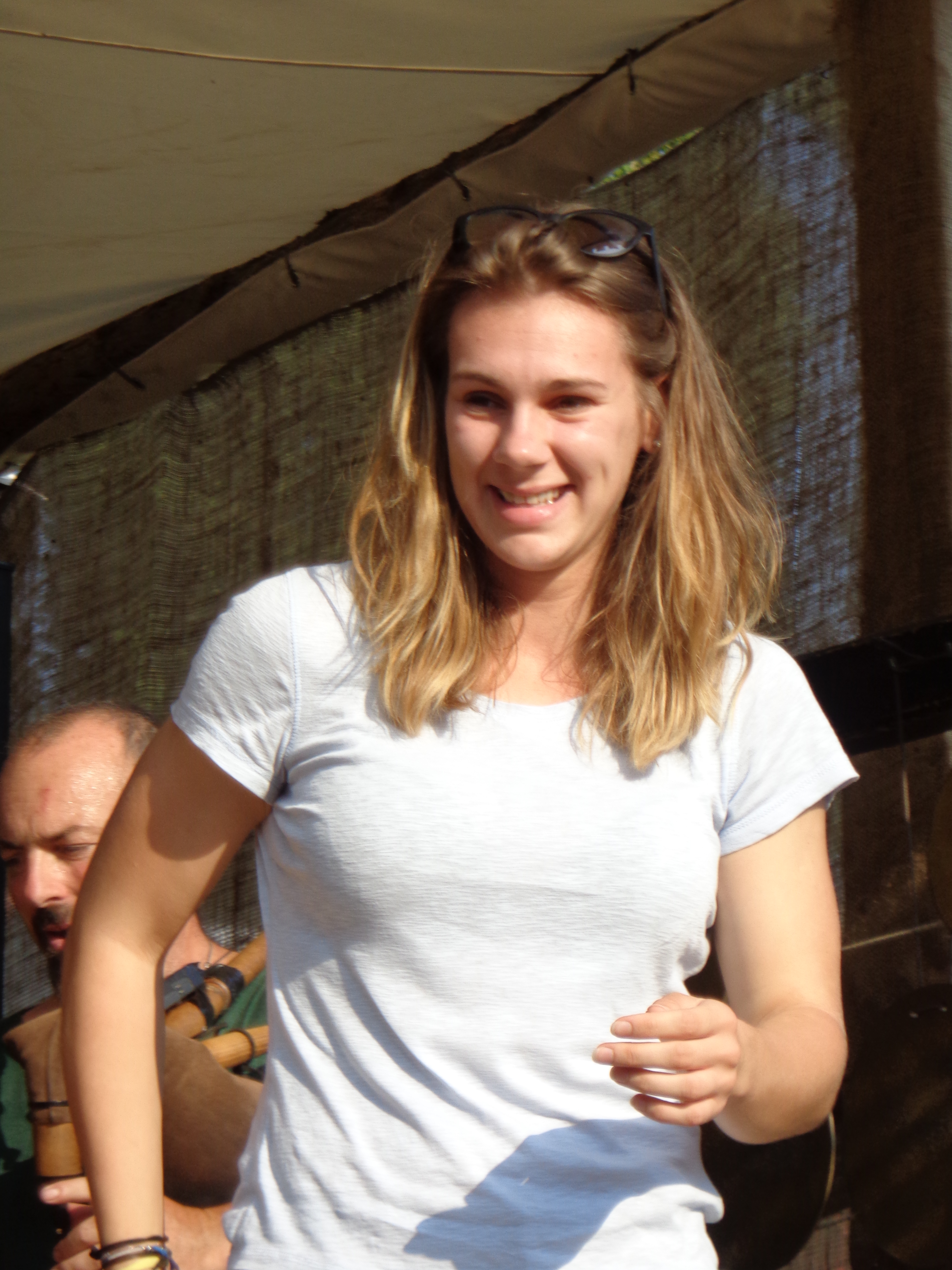
- Kolak in 2016

Personal information
- Nationality: Croatian
- Born: 22 June 1995 (age 31) Ludbreg, Croatia
- Height: 1.70 m (5 ft 7 in)
- Weight: 74 kg (163 lb)

Sport
- Country: Croatia
- Sport: Track and field
- Event: Javelin throw

Achievements and titles
- Personal bests: NR 68.43 (2017)
Medal record
Women's athletics
Representing Croatia
Olympic Games
Gold medal – first place	2016 Rio de Janeiro	Javelin throw
European Championships
Gold medal – first place	2026 Birmingham	Javelin throw
Bronze medal – third place	2016 Amsterdam	Javelin throw
Mediterranean Games
Bronze medal – third place	2026 Taranto	Javelin throw
European U23 Championships
Gold medal – first place	2017 Bydgoszcz	Javelin throw
World Junior Championships
Bronze medal – third place	2014 Eugene	Javelin throw
European Junior Championships
Bronze medal – third place	2013 Rieti	Javelin throw
European Throwing Cup
Bronze medal – third place	2025 Nicosia	Javelin Throw
European Winter Throwing Cup
Gold medal – first place	2017 Gran Canaria	Javelin Throw
Silver medal – second place	2016 Arad	Javelin Throw
Silver medal – second place	2014 Leiria	Javelin Throw

Sara Kolak (born 22 June 1995) is a Croatian track and field athlete who competes in the javelin throw. She is an Olympic champion and won the gold medal in the javelin throw event at the 2016 Summer Olympics. Kolak is also a European champion and European U23 champion. She holds the Croatian record with a personal best throw of 68.43 m, set in 2017. It also ranks her tenth on the world all-time list. Kolak is a three-time Olympian and competed at the 2016, 2020 and 2024 Summer Olympics.

== Career ==
Kolak made her junior international debut at the 2012 World Junior Championships in Barcelona. She won bronze medals at the 2013 European Junior Championships in Rieti and 2014 World Junior Championships in Eugene. Kolak made her senior international debut at the 2014 European Championships in Zurich. That same year, she underwent surgery for a shoulder injury and was sidelined for 15 months. She won the bronze medal in the javelin throw at the 2016 European Championships in Amsterdam.

Kolak won the gold medal in the women's javelin throw event at the 2016 Summer Olympics in Rio, where she also set a new national record with a throw of 66.18 metres. She bested her record the following year with a 68.43 m throw at Athletissima in Lausanne. She won the gold medal in the javelin throw at the 2017 European U23 Championship in Bydgoszcz and placed fourth in the javelin throw at the 2017 World Championships in London.

Following the 2017 World Championships, Kolak struggled with an elbow injury. The Croatian Olympic Committee approved a $150,000 funding for her surgery, which was carried out in Minnesota. After the surgery, she underwent rehabilitation of the ligaments and returned to competition in the summer of 2019, placing seventh at the 2019 World Championships in Doha. In August 2019, she relocated from Slovenia to Norway in order to be coached by two-time Olympic champion Andreas Thorkildsen. Kolak competed in the javelin throw event at the 2020 Summer Olympics in Tokyo, but failed to qualify for the final. She placed eleventh at the 2024 European Championships in Rome and fourth in the javelin throw event at the 2024 Summer Olympics in Paris.

At the 2026 European Championships in Birmingham, England, she won the gold medal in the javelin with a throw of 62.43 metres.

== International competitions ==
Year	Competition	Venue	Position	Event	Notes
Representing Croatia
2012	World Junior Championships	Barcelona, Spain	23rd (q)	Javelin throw	48.15 m
2013	European Junior Championships	Rieti, Italy	3rd	Javelin throw	57.79 m
2014	World Junior Championships	Eugene, United States	3rd	Javelin throw	55.74 m
2014	European Championships	Zurich, Switzerland	21st (q)	Javelin throw	52.51 m
2016	European Championships	Amsterdam, Netherlands	3rd	Javelin throw	63.50 m
2016	Olympic Games	Rio de Janeiro, Brazil	1st	Javelin throw	66.18 m
2017	European U23 Championships	Bydgoszcz, Poland	1st	Javelin throw	65.12 m
2017	World Championships	London, United Kingdom	4th	Javelin throw	64.95 m
2019	World Championships	Doha, Qatar	7th	Javelin throw	62.28 m
2021	Olympic Games	Tokyo, Japan	–	Javelin throw	NM
2022	World Championships	Eugene, United States	–	Javelin throw	NM
2022	European Championships	Munich, Germany	14th (q)	Javelin throw	57.31 m
2023	World Championships	Budapest, Hungary	23rd (q)	Javelin throw	55.89 m
2024	European Championships	Rome, Italy	11th	Javelin throw	55.90 m
2024	Olympic Games	Paris, France	4th	Javelin throw	63.40 m
2026	European Championships	Birmingham, United Kingdom	1st	Javelin throw	62.43 m
2026	Mediterranean Games	Taranto, Italy	3rd	Javelin throw	62.64 m
(q) Indicates overall position in qualifying round

== Awards ==
- Order of Danica Hrvatska with face of Franjo Bučar - 2016
