= Réka Szilágyi =

Hungarian javelin thrower

- Réka Szilágyi in 2017

Personal information
- Born: 19 January 1996 (age 30) Szolnok, Hungary
- Education: University of Debrecen

Sport
- Sport: Athletics
- Event: Javelin throw
- Club: DSC-SI

Réka Szilágyi (born 19 January 1996) is a Hungarian athlete specialising in the javelin throw. She represented her country at the 2020 Olympic Games, and the 2019 and 2023 World Athletics Championships without qualifying for the final at those events. She finished fourth the 2019 Summer Universiade and fourth at the 2022 European Athletics Championships. As a junior, she also had fourth-place finishes at the 2013 World Youth Championships and the 2015 European Athletics Junior Championships. Her personal best in the event is 62.45 metres set in Hungary in 2020.

== Career ==
She had a fourth-place finish at the 2013 World Youth Championships in Athletics, in the javelin throw in Donetsk, Ukraine. She also had a fourth-place finish at the 2015 European Athletics Junior Championships, in Eskilstuna, Sweden.

She finished in fourth place at the World University Summer Games in 2019 in Naples, Italy. That year, she competed for Hungary at the 2019 World Athletics Championships in Doha, but did not reach the final.

She competed at the delayed 2020 Olympic Games held in Tokyo, Japan, in 2021, with a best throw of 57.39 metres, but did not progress to the final.

She threw 57.46 metres to win the Hungarian Athletics Championships in Budapest on 24 June 2022. She finished in fourth place at the 2022 European Athletics Championships in Munich, Germany, with a best throw of 60.57 metres.

She completed at the 2023 World Athletics Championships in Budapest, Hungary, without reaching the final.

== Personal life ==
She is from Tószeg in the Northern Great Plain of Hungary. She was a member of Debrecen Sports Center, Debrecen.

== International competitions ==
Year	Competition	Venue	Position	Event	Notes
Representing Hungary
2013	World Youth Championships	Donetsk, Ukraine	4th	Javelin throw	54.24 m
2014	World Junior Championships	Eugene, United States	18th (q)	Javelin throw	49.29 m
2015	European Junior Championships	Eskilstuna, Sweden	4th	Javelin throw	55.91 m
2016	European Championships	Amsterdam, Netherlands	21st (q)	Javelin throw	55.19 m
2017	European U23 Championships	Bydgoszcz, Poland	9th	Javelin throw	55.53 m
2017	Universiade	Taipei, Taiwan	13th	Javelin throw	52.54 m
2019	Universiade	Naples, Italy	4th	Javelin throw	59.02 m
2019	World Championships	Doha, Qatar	25th (q)	Javelin throw	56.26 m
2021	Olympic Games	Tokyo, Japan	25th (q)	Javelin throw	57.39 m
2022	European Championships	Munich, Germany	4th	Javelin throw	60.57 m
2023	World Championships	Budapest, Hungary	20th (q)	Javelin throw	56.21 m
