= Athletics at the 2019 Summer Universiade – Women's javelin throw =

The women's javelin throw event at the 2019 Summer Universiade was held on 8 and 10 July at the Stadio San Paolo in Naples.

== Medalists ==
Gold	Silver	Bronze
Liveta Jasiūnaitė; Lithuania	Haruka Kitaguchi; Japan	Eda Tuğsuz; Turkey

== Results ==
=== Qualification ===
Qualification: 59.00 m (Q) or at least 12 best (q) qualified for the final.

Rank	Group	Name	Nationality	#1	#2	#3	Result	Notes
1	B	Réka Szilágyi	Hungary	59.16			59.16	Q
2	B	Haruka Kitaguchi	Japan	53.50	54.25	57.91	57.91	q
3	B	Mackenzie Little	Australia	57.87	–	–	57.87	q
4	A	Liveta Jasiūnaitė	Lithuania	56.72	57.66	x	57.66	q
5	A	Jo-Ane van Dyk	South Africa	53.77	54.17	57.36	57.36	q, PB
6	A	Eda Tuğsuz	Turkey	56.19	x	56.65	56.65	q
7	B	Su Lingdan	China	56.10	52.55	x	56.10	q
8	A	Victoria Hudson	Austria	53.15	x	56.07	56.07	q
9	A	Ashley Pryke	Canada	53.70	53.36	x	53.70	q
10	B	Mirell Luik	Estonia	47.55	53.64	x	53.64	q
11	B	Sanobarhon Erkinova	Uzbekistan	49.52	52.87	52.38	52.87	q
12	A	Viktoryia Yermakova	Belarus	50.85	52.57	51.75	52.57	q
13	A	Katja Mihelič	Slovenia	50.33	51.96	49.57	51.96	
14	B	Saara Lipsanen	Finland	49.37	49.79	48.94	49.79	
15	B	Maria Børstad Jensen	Norway	46.08	48.43	49.07	49.07	
16	A	Jess Bell	Australia	46.34	49.04	46.75	49.04	
17	B	Laine Donāne	Latvia	45.70	44.42	48.77	48.77	
18	A	Lee Ga-hui	South Korea	46.92	x	48.56	48.56	
19	B	Brittni Wolczyk	Canada	48.01	44.18	45.58	48.01	
20	A	Yohana Arias	Argentina	45.53	46.44	47.17	47.17	
21	A	Marcella Liiv	Estonia	x	x	42.00	42.00	
22	B	Cerah Ellen Moren	Philippines	x	35.51	x	35.51	
23	B	Jayamini Henapola	Sri Lanka	27.96	34.25	33.68	34.25	

=== Final ===
Official Video

Rank	Name	Nationality	#1	#2	#3	#4	#5	#6	Result	Notes
1st place, gold medalist(s)	Liveta Jasiūnaitė	Lithuania	53.44	56.76	56.29	59.03	60.36	x	60.36	
2nd place, silver medalist(s)	Haruka Kitaguchi	Japan	56.76	56.74	58.16	59.16	60.15	53.55	60.15	
3rd place, bronze medalist(s)	Eda Tuğsuz	Turkey	59.75	59.62	x	x	x	x	59.75	
4	Réka Szilágyi	Hungary	56.77	58.17	58.65	x	59.02	56.11	59.02	
5	Su Lingdan	China	55.23	55.11	54.65	56.89	x	x	56.89	
6	Jo-Ane van Dyk	South Africa	54.93	56.85	53.68	x	53.59	53.80	56.85	SB
7	Victoria Hudson	Austria	55.74	54.67	x	56.80	x	x	56.80	
8	Mackenzie Little	Australia	55.37	x	x	x	54.90	x	55.37	
9	Sanobarhon Erkinova	Uzbekistan	52.04	49.44	50.07				52.04	
10	Mirell Luik	Estonia	46.61	47.76	51.95				51.95	
11	Viktoryia Yermakova	Belarus	51.53	x	51.54				51.54	
12	Ashley Pryke	Canada	x	49.82	x				49.82	
