= 2016 European Throwing Cup =

- Dates: 14–15 March
- Host city: Arad, Romania
- Events: 16
- Participation: 248 athletes

The 2016 European Throwing Cup was held on 12 and 13 March at the Gloria Arad Stadium in Arad, Romania. It was the sixteenth edition of the athletics competition for throwing events and was jointly organised by the European Athletic Association. The competition featured men's and women's contests in shot put, discus throw, javelin throw and hammer throw. In addition to the senior competitions, there were under-23 events for younger athletes.

== Medal summary ==
=== Senior ===
Men
Event	Gold		Silver		Bronze	
Shot put	Andrei Gag (ROU)	20.68 m	Tsanko Arnaudov (POR)	19.85 m	Sebastiano Bianchetti (ITA)	19.78 m
Discus throw	Axel Härstedt (SWE)	62.73 m	Martin Kupper (EST)	62.20 m	Mykyta Nesterenko (UKR)	62.01 m
Hammer throw	Krisztián Pars (HUN)	75.21 m	Siarhei Kalamoyets (BLR)	75.17 m	Marco Lingua (ITA)	74.51 m
Javelin throw	Uladzimir Kazlou (BLR)	79.34 m	Norbert Bonvecchio (ITA)	76.66 m	Zigismunds Sirmais (LVA)	75.41 m

Women
Event	Gold		Silver		Bronze	
Shot put	Alena Abramchuk (BLR)	17.21 m	Jessica Cérival (FRA)	17.05 m	Markéta Červenková (CZE)	16.86 m
Discus throw	Mélina Robert-Michon (FRA)	62.05 m	Pauline Pousse (FRA)	58.24 m	Eliška Staňková (CZE)	55.55 m
Hammer throw	Zalina Marghieva (MDA)	72.58 m	Alexandra Tavernier (FRA)	70.79 m	Betty Heidler (GER)	69.83 m
Javelin throw	Christin Hussong (GER)	61.80 m	Līna Mūze (LVA)	61.26 m	Ásdís Hjálmsdóttir (ISL)	59.53 m

=== Under-23 ===
Under-23 men
Event	Gold		Silver		Bronze	
Shot put	Osman Can Özdeveci (TUR)	18.59 m	Patrick Müller (GER)	18.12 m	Karl Koha (EST)	17.29 m
Discus throw	Simon Pettersson (SWE)	60.28 m	Alin Firfirică (ROU)	59.28 m	Domantas Poška (LTU)	58.08 m
Hammer throw	Özkan Baltacı (TUR)	72.11 m	Bence Halász (HUN)	71.16 m	Matija Gregurić (CRO)	71.13 m
Javelin throw	Julian Weber (GER)	81.24 m	Norbert Rivasz-Tóth (HUN)	77.70 m	Emin Öncel (TUR)	72.64 m

Under 23 women
Event	Gold		Silver		Bronze	
Shot put	Fanny Roos (SWE)	16.08 m	Rose Sharon Pierre-Louis (FRA)	15.97 m	Alena Pasechnik (BLR)	15.88 m
Discus throw	Veronika Domjan (GER)	54.04 m	Salla Sipponen (FIN)	53.15 m	Alexandra Emilianov (MDA)	52.58 m
Hammer throw	Hanna Malyshchyk (BLR)	68.76 m	Réka Gyurátz (HUN)	68.96 m	Marinda Petersson (SWE)	66.18 m
Javelin throw	Sigrid Borge (NOR)	59.33 m	Sara Kolak (CRO)	58.11 m	Arantxa Moreno (ESP)	54.75 m
