= Yulenmis Aguilar =

Spanish javelin thrower (born 1996)

Personal information
- Full name: Yulenmis Aguilar Martínez
- Born: 3 August 1996 (age 30) Bayamo, Cuba
- Height: 1.69 m (5 ft 7 in)
- Weight: 69 kg (152 lb)

Sport
- Country: Spain
- Sport: Track and field
- Event: Javelin throw
Medal record
Women's athletics
Representing Spain
Mediterranean Games
Silver medal – second place	2026 Taranto	Javelin throw
Women's athletics
Representing Cuba
Central American and Caribbean Games
Bronze medal – third place	2018 Barranquilla	Javelin throw

Yulenmis Aguilar Martínez (born 3 August 1996) is a track and field athlete, specialising in the javelin throw. Born in Cuba, she represents Spain internationally.

== Career ==
She competed for her country of birth at the 2015 World Championships in Beijing without qualifying for the final. In the Pan American Junior Edmonton 2015 he launched 63.86 which is the current Junior world record.

Her personal best in the event is 64.17 metres, set in Spain in 2022.

== Competition record ==
Year	Competition	Venue	Position	Event	Notes
Representing Cuba
2013	World Youth Championships	Donetsk, Ukraine	2nd	Javelin throw (500 g)	59.94 m
2013	Pan American Junior Championships	Medellín, Colombia	2nd	Javelin throw	50.00 m
2014	Central American and Caribbean Games	Xalapa, Mexico	4th	Javelin throw	54.50 m
2015	Pan American Games	Toronto, Canada	6th	Javelin throw	57.87 m
2015	Pan American Junior Championships	Edmonton, Canada	1st	Javelin throw	63.86 m
2015	NACAC Championships	San José, Costa Rica	2nd	Javelin throw	56.79 m
2015	World Championships	Beijing, China	18th (q)	Javelin throw	60.52 m
2016	NACAC U23 Championships	San Salvador, El Salvador	1st	Javelin throw	57.09 m
2016	Olympic Games	Rio de Janeiro, Brazil	29th (q)	Javelin throw	54.94 m
2018	Central American and Caribbean Games	Barranquilla, Colombia	3rd	Javelin throw	55.60 m
Representing Spain
2024	European Championships	Rome, Italy	13th (q)	Javelin throw	57.27 m
2024	Olympic Games	Paris, France	6th	Javelin throw	62.78 m
2026	European Championships	Birmingham, United Kingdom	9th	Javelin throw	57.06 m
2026	Mediterranean Games	Taranto, Italy	2nd	Javelin throw	65.39 m
