= Athletics at the 2020 Summer Olympics – Women's javelin throw =

Women's javelin throw at the Games of the XXXII Olympiad
- Olympic Athletics
- Venue: Japan National Stadium
- Dates: 3 August 2021 (qualifying); 6 August 2021 (final)
- Competitors: 30 from 20 nations
- Winning Distance: 66.34

Medalists
1st place, gold medalist(s)		Liu Shiying	China
2nd place, silver medalist(s)		Maria Andrejczyk	Poland
3rd place, bronze medalist(s)		Kelsey-Lee Barber	Australia

The women's javelin throw event at the 2020 Summer Olympics took place on 3 and 6 August 2021 at the Japan National Stadium. Approximately 35 athletes competed; the exact number was dependent on how many nations use universality places to enter athletes in addition to the 32 qualifying through distance or ranking (no universality places were used in 2016).

== Background ==
This was the 21st appearance of the event, having appeared in every Summer Olympics since 1932.

== Qualification ==
A National Olympic Committee (NOC) could enter up to 3 qualified athletes in the women's javelin throw event if all athletes meet the entry standard or qualify by ranking during the qualifying period. (The limit of 3 has been in place since the 1930 Olympic Congress.) The qualifying standard is 64.00 metres. This standard was "set for the sole purpose of qualifying athletes with exceptional performances unable to qualify through the IAAF World Rankings pathway." The world rankings, based on the average of the best five results for the athlete over the qualifying period and weighted by the importance of the meet, will then be used to qualify athletes until the cap of 32 is reached.

The qualifying period was originally from 1 May 2019 to 29 June 2020. Due to the COVID-19 pandemic, the period was suspended from 6 April 2020 to 30 November 2020, with the end date extended to 29 June 2021. The world rankings period start date was also changed from 1 May 2019 to 30 June 2020; athletes who had met the qualifying standard during that time were still qualified, but those using world rankings would not be able to count performances during that time. The qualifying time standards could be obtained in various meets during the given period that have the approval of the IAAF. Both outdoor and indoor meets are eligible. The most recent Area Championships may be counted in the ranking, even if not during the qualifying period.

NOCs can also use their universality place—each NOC can enter one female athlete regardless of time if they had no female athletes meeting the entry standard for an athletics event—in the javelin throw.

== Competition format ==
The 2020 competition continued to use the two-round format with divided final introduced in 1936. The qualifying round gave each competitor three throws to achieve a qualifying distance (not yet set; 2016 used 63.00 metres); if fewer than 12 women did so, the top 12 would advance. The final provided each thrower with three throws; the top eight throwers received an additional three throws for a total of six, with the best to count (qualifying round throws were not considered for the final).

== Records ==
Prior to this competition, the existing global and area records were as follows.

World record	Barbora Špotáková (CZE)	72.28	Stuttgart, Germany	13 September 2008
Olympic record	Osleidys Menéndez (CUB)	71.53	Athens, Greece	27 August 2004
World Leading	Maria Andrejczyk (POL)	71.40	Split, Croatia	9 May 2021

Area	Distance (m)	Athlete	Nation
Africa (records)	69.35	Sunette Viljoen	South Africa
Asia (records)	67.98	Lü Huihui	China
Europe (records)	72.28 WR	Barbora Špotáková	Czech Republic
North, Central America and Caribbean (records)	71.70	Osleidys Menéndez	Cuba
Oceania (records)	68.92	Kathryn Mitchell	Australia
South America (records)	63.84	Flor Ruiz	Colombia

== Schedule ==
All times are Japan Standard Time (UTC+9)

The women's javelin throw took place over two separate days.

Date	Time	Round
Tuesday, 3 August 2021	9:00	Qualifying
Friday, 6 August 2021	19:50	Final

== Results ==
=== Qualifying ===
Qualification: Qualifying performance 63.00 (Q) or at least 12 best performers (q) advance to the Final.

Rank	Group	Athlete	Nation	#1	#2	#3	Distance	Notes
1	A	Maria Andrejczyk	Poland	65.24			65.24	Q
2	B	Maggie Malone	United States	63.07			63.07	Q
3	B	Kelsey-Lee Barber	Australia	51.27	53.82	62.59	62.59	q, SB
4	A	Mackenzie Little	Australia	62.37	58.94	53.57	62.37	q, PB
5	B	Eda Tuğsuz	Turkey	X	62.31	X	62.31	q, SB
6	B	Haruka Kitaguchi	Japan	62.06	59.55	X	62.06	q, SB
7	A	Lü Huihui	China	59.22	57.20	61.99	61.99	q
8	B	Liveta Jasiūnaitė	Lithuania	61.96	58.74	60.76	61.96	q
9	B	Liu Shiying	China	61.95	60.68	59.76	61.95	q
10	B	Kathryn Mitchell	Australia	X	61.85	X	61.85	q
11	B	Christin Hussong	Germany	59.19	61.68	58.06	61.68	q
12	A	Madara Palameika	Latvia	60.30	59.85	60.94	60.94	q, SB
13	A	Tatsiana Khaladovich	Belarus	60.78	X	58.93	60.78	
14	B	Barbora Špotáková	Czech Republic	X	60.52	57.44	60.52	
15	A	Jucilene de Lima	Brazil	X	60.14	58.79	60.14	
16	A	Nikola Ogrodníková	Czech Republic	X	60.03	57.41	60.03	
17	A	Kara Winger	United States	57.95	59.71	58.51	59.71	
18	B	Laila Ferrer e Silva	Brazil	59.47	56.81	57.61	59.47	
19	B	Irena Gillarová	Czech Republic	X	59.16	X	59.16	SB
20	A	Marija Vučenović	Serbia	54.61	57.73	58.93	58.93	
21	B	Victoria Hudson	Austria	56.55	58.60	X	58.60	
22	A	Anete Kociņa	Latvia	X	58.84	57.68	58.84	
23	A	Elizabeth Gleadle	Canada	X	55.70	58.19	58.19	
24	B	Jo-Ane van Dyk	South Africa	55.31	55.43	57.69	57.69	
25	A	Réka Szilágyi	Hungary	57.39	57.22	55.82	57.39	
26	B	Līna Mūze	Latvia	54.03	53.10	57.33	57.33	
27	B	Ariana Ince	United States	X	53.21	54.98	54.98	
28	A	María Lucelly Murillo	Colombia	49.48	54.98	X	54.98	
29	A	Annu Rani	India	50.35	53.19	54.04	54.04	
	A	Sara Kolak	Croatia	X	X	X	NM	

=== Final ===
Rank	Athlete	Nation	#1	#2	#3	#4	#5	#6	Distance	Notes
1st place, gold medalist(s)	Liu Shiying	China	66.34	X	63.40	X	—	—	66.34	SB
2nd place, silver medalist(s)	Maria Andrejczyk	Poland	62.56	64.61	61.03	63.62	64.45	59.31	64.61	
3rd place, bronze medalist(s)	Kelsey-Lee Barber	Australia	61.98	63.69	63.34	64.04	58.85	64.56	64.56	SB
4	Eda Tuğsuz	Turkey	X	X	62.13	62.17	63.35	64.00	64.00	SB
5	Lü Huihui	China	62.83	63.11	63.41	61.85	59.54	59.44	63.41	
6	Kathryn Mitchell	Australia	61.82	61.66	60.08	X	X	X	61.82	
7	Liveta Jasiūnaitė	Lithuania	60.06	58.66	59.09	55.64	58.39	X	60.06	
8	Mackenzie Little	Australia	59.96	57.80	55.47	54.76	54.94	54.51	59.96	
9	Christin Hussong	Germany	59.94	59.18	59.61	did not advance			59.94	
10	Maggie Malone	United States	53.88	59.82	58.88	did not advance			59.82	
11	Madara Palameika	Latvia	X	54.30	58.70	did not advance			58.70	
12	Haruka Kitaguchi	Japan	53.45	X	55.42	did not advance			55.42	
