= Victoria Hudson (athlete) =

Austrian javelin thrower (born 1996)

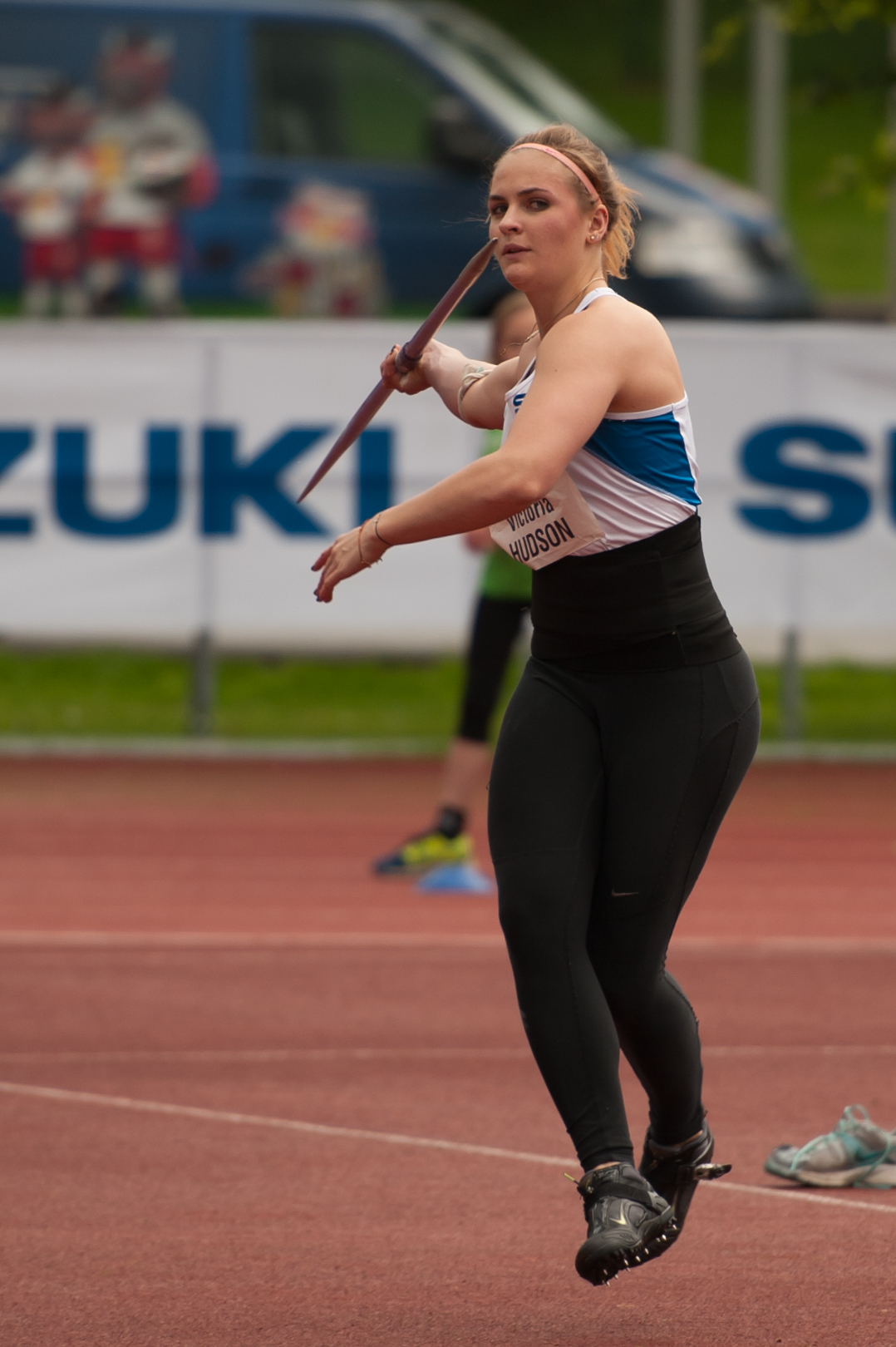
- Hudson in 2015

Personal information
- Born: 28 May 1996 (age 30)
- Education: University of Vienna
- Height: 1.69 m (5 ft 7 in)
- Weight: 64 kg (141 lb)

Sport
- Sport: Athletics
- Event: Javelin throw
- Club: SV Schwechat
- Coached by: Gregor Högler (–2016); Elisabeth Eberl (2016–)

Achievements and titles
- Personal best: 64.68 m (2021)
Medal record
Women's athletics
Representing Austria
European Championships
Gold medal – first place	2024 Rome	Javelin throw
European Games
Bronze medal – third place	2023 Kraków-Małopolska	Javelin throw

Victoria Hudson (born 28 May 1996) is an Austrian athlete specialising in the javelin throw. She is a European champion and won the gold medal at the 2024 Championships in Rome, earning Austria's first gold medal at the championships since 1971. Hudson is also a European Games bronze medallist and two-times Olympian. She competed in the javelin event at the 2020 and 2024 Summer Olympics.

Hudson's personal best throw is 64.68 metres, set in Eisenstadt on April 26, 2021. She was born in Austria to an English father and Austrian mother.

== International competitions ==
Year	Competition	Venue	Position	Event	Notes
Representing Austria
2013	World Youth Championships	Donetsk, Ukraine	30th (q)	Javelin throw	44.53 m
2015	European Junior Championships	Eskilstuna, Sweden	7th	Javelin throw	52.68 m
2017	European U23 Championships	Bydgoszcz, Poland	23rd (q)	Javelin throw	46.57 m
2017	Universiade	Taipei, Taiwan	22nd (q)	Javelin throw	49.35 m
2019	European Throwing Cup	Šamorín, Slovakia	6th	Javelin throw	59.98 m
2019	Universiade	Naples, Italy	7th	Javelin throw	56.80 m
2019	World Championships	Doha, Qatar	31st (q)	Javelin throw	52.51 m
2021	Olympic Games	Tokyo, Japan	21st (q)	Javelin throw	58.60 m
2022	World Championships	Eugene, United States	23rd (q)	Javelin throw	54.05 m
2022	European Championships	Munich, Germany	10th	Javelin throw	56.07 m
2023	World Championships	Budapest, Hungary	5th	Javelin throw	62.92 m
2024	European Championships	Rome, Italy	1st	Javelin throw	64.62 m
2024	Olympic Games	Paris, France	20th (q)	Javelin throw	59.69 m
