= Christin Hussong =

German javelin thrower (born 1994)

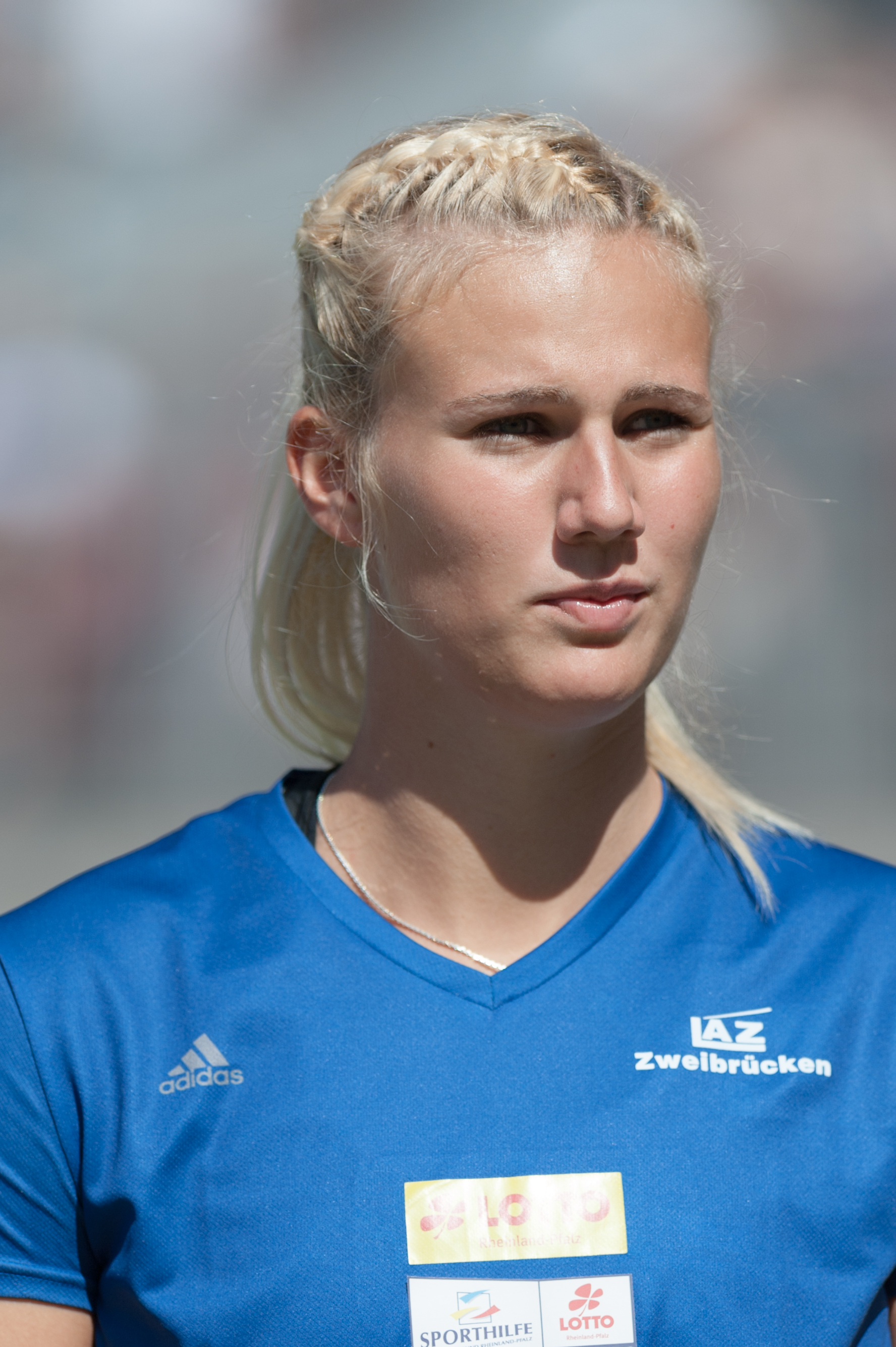
- Hussong at the 2015 German Athletics Championships

Personal information
- Nationality: German
- Born: 17 March 1994 (age 32) Zweibrücken, Germany
- Height: 1.86 m (6 ft 1 in)
- Weight: 84 kg (185 lb)

Sport
- Country: Germany
- Sport: Track and field
- Event: Javelin throw
- Club: TV Thaleischweiler (until 2012); LAZ Zweibrücken (2012–)
- Coached by: Udo Hussong

Achievements and titles
- Personal best: 69.19 m (2021)
Medal record
Representing Germany
European Championships
Gold medal – first place	2018 Berlin	Javelin throw
European U23 Championships
Gold medal – first place	2015 Tallinn	Javelin throw
European Junior Championships
Silver medal – second place	2013 Rieti	Javelin throw
World Youth Championships
Gold medal – first place	2011 Lille	Javelin throw
Representing Europe
Continental Cup
Silver medal – second place	2018 Ostrava	Javelin throw
- Updated on 9 September 2018

Christin Hussong (born 17 March 1994) is a German track and field athlete who competes in the javelin throw. She has won gold at the 2011 World Youth Championships, 2015 European U23 Championships and at the 2018 European Championships. Hussong holds the European Championships record with her personal best throw of 69.19 m.

She is a member of LAZ Zweibrücken's track and field squad and is coached by her father, Udo Hussong.

== Career ==
=== 2010–2015 ===
Hussong represented Germany in the girls' javelin throw at the 2010 Summer Youth Olympics, placing fourth with a throw of 49.89 m. Her season best that year, 55.35 m, ranked her third in the world among youth athletes.

Hussong improved her personal best to 59.74 m at the 2011 World Youth Championships, winning gold by more than five metres and setting a new championship record; the International Association of Athletics Federations named her Rising Star of the Year in women's athletics. 59.74 m remained Hussong's personal best until 2014; at the 2012 World Junior Championships she threw 53.20 m in her best effort and placed seventh, while at the 2013 European Junior Championships she threw 57.90 m and won silver, one centimetre behind gold medalist Sofi Flink of Sweden.

In 2014, Hussong broke 60 metres for the first time, winning with a throw of 60.26 m at the German U23 Championships on 15 June. A month later, she threw 63.34 m at the Spitzen Leichtathletik Luzern meeting, setting a German U23 record and meeting the qualifying standard for the European Championships. At the 2014 European Championships she threw 61.13 m in the qualification round and 59.29 m in the final, placing seventh.

In March 2015, she won gold with a throw of 60.81 m at the 2015 European U23 Throwing Cup. In July, she won gold at the 2015 European U23 Championships with a 65.60 m throw, seven metres ahead of second place. This 65.60 m throw broke both her own German U23 record and Madara Palameika's championship record and moved Hussong to second (behind Mariya Abakumova) on the European U23 all-time list. She then competed at the 2015 World Championships in August. She placed first in the qualification round with a personal best throw of 65.92 m and finished sixth in the final with a 62.98 m effort.

=== 2016–present ===
In March 2016, she competed at the 2016 European Throwing Cup, where she won gold with a 61.80 m throw. In June, she set a new personal best of 66.41 m at the 2016 German Athletics Championships, winning the competition in the process. The next month, she competed at the 2016 European Championships, where she placed seventeenth with a 57.17 m throw in the qualification round and did not make it to the final. In August, Hussong represented her homeland at the 2016 Summer Olympics. She advanced through the qualification round with a throw of 62.17 m and placed twelfth in the final with a 57.70 m throw.

In March 2017, she competed at the 2017 European Throwing Cup, where she won bronze with a 59.00 m throw. In July, she placed first at the 2017 Spitzen Leichtathletik Luzern with a seasonal best throw of 64.18 m. In August, she participated in the 2017 World Championships. She placed seventeenth in the qualification round with a throw of 60.86 m and did not make it through to the final. Later that month, she competed at the 2017 Summer Universiade. She topped the qualification round with a 60.18 m throw then finished fifth in the final with a 60.59 m effort.

In July 2018, Hussong won gold at the German Athletics Championships for a second time, with a throw of 63.54 m. In August, she won gold at the 2018 European Athletics Championships. She won the qualifying round with a personal best throw of 67.29 m, and in the final set another personal best—and championship record—throw of 67.90 m, over six metres further than silver medallist Nikola Ogrodníková. She won silver at the 2018 IAAF Continental Cup in September.

Hussong opened her 2019 season by winning a silver medal at the 2019 European Throwing Cup in March with a throw of 65.47 m, thus surpassing the World Championships qualifying standard of 61.50 m. At the 2019 World Athletics Championships from 30 September to 1 October, Hussong placed fourth in the final, throwing 65.21 m.

== Competition record ==
Year	Competition	Venue	Position	Notes
Representing Germany
2011	World Youth Championships	Lille, France	1st	59.74 m
2012	World Junior Championships	Barcelona, Spain	7th	53.20 m
2013	European Junior Championships	Rieti, Italy	2nd	57.90 m
2014	European Championships	Zürich, Switzerland	7th	59.29 m
2015	European U23 Throwing Cup	Leiria, Portugal	1st	60.91 m
2015	European U23 Championships	Tallinn, Estonia	1st	65.60 m
2015	World Championships	Beijing, China	6th	62.98 m
2016	European Throwing Cup	Arad, Romania	1st	61.80 m
2016	European Championships	Amsterdam, Netherlands	17th (q)	57.17 m
2016	Olympic Games	Rio de Janeiro, Brazil	12th	57.70 m
2017	European Throwing Cup	Las Palmas, Spain	3rd	59.00 m
2017	World Championships	London, England	17th (q)	60.86 m
2017	Universiade	Taipei, Taiwan	5th	60.59 m
2018	European Throwing Cup	Leiria, Portugal	2nd	60.02 m
2018	European Championships	Berlin, Germany	1st	67.90 m, CR
2018	Continental Cup	Ostrava, Czech Republic	2nd	62.96 m
2019	European Throwing Cup	Šamorín, Slovakia	2nd	65.47 m
2019	World Championships	Doha, Qatar	4th	65.21 m
2021	Olympic Games	Tokyo, Japan	9th	59.94 m
2024	European Championships	Rome, Italy	4th	61.92 m
2024	Olympic Games	Paris, France	18th (q)	59.99 m

== Seasonal bests by year ==
View chart definition.
- 2009 – 49.93 m
- 2010 – 55.35 m
- 2011 – 59.74 m
- 2012 – 55.74 m
- 2013 – 58.55 m
- 2014 – 63.34 m
- 2015 – 65.92 m
- 2016 – 66.41 m
- 2017 – 64.18 m
- 2018 – 67.90 m
- 2019 – 66.59 m
- 2020 - 64.10 m
- 2021 - 69.19 m
