= Marie-Therese Obst =

Norwegian javelin thrower

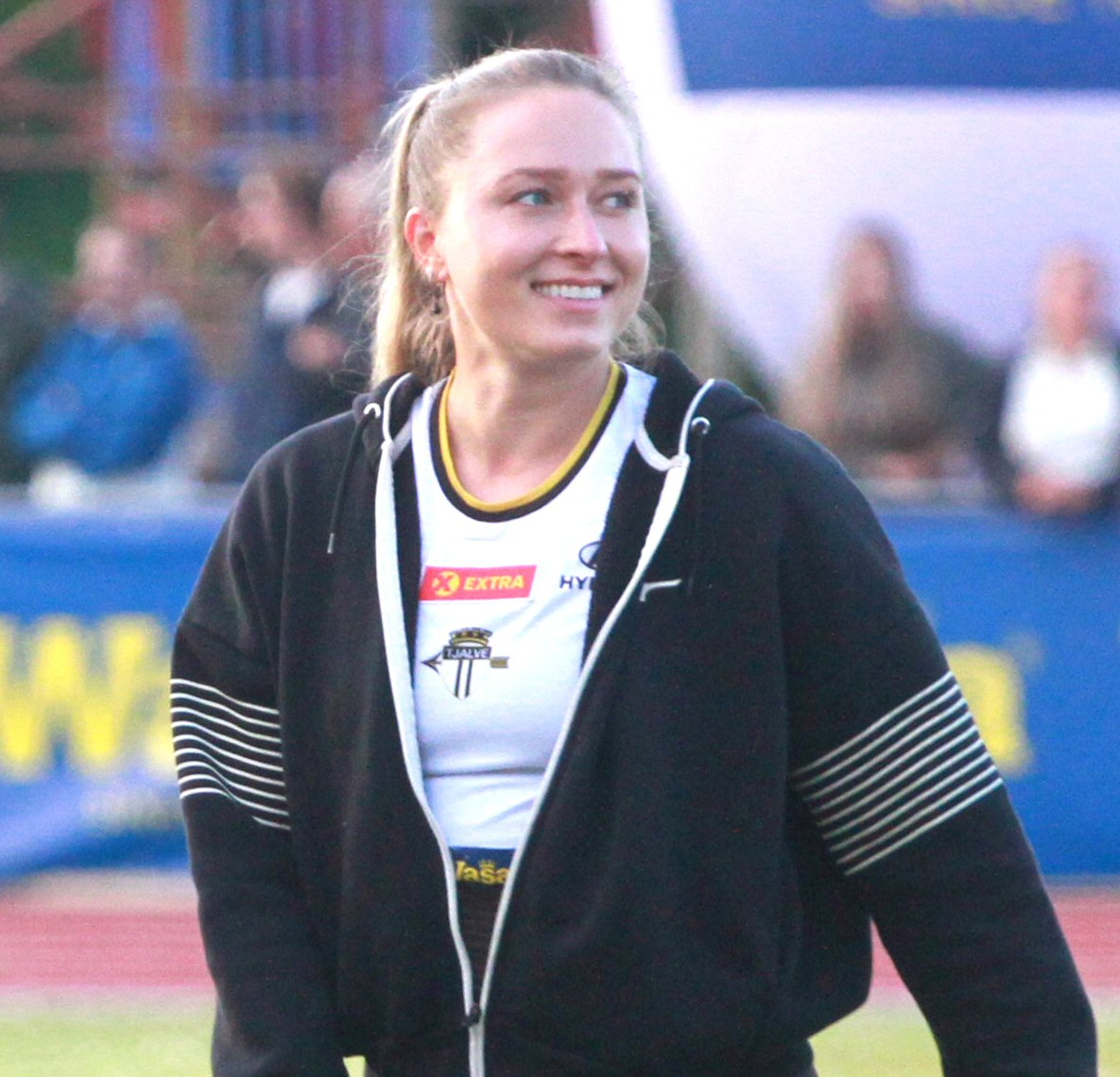
- Obst at the 2026 Norwegian Athletics Championships

Personal information
- Nationality: Norway (since 2013); Germany (before 2013)
- Born: 7 January 1996 (age 30) Berlin, Germany
- Home town: Oslo, Norway
- Education: WANG Toppidrett; University of Georgia
- Height: 5 ft 6 in (168 cm)

Sport
- Sport: Athletics
- Event: Javelin throw
- College team: Georgia Bulldogs
- Club: IK Tjalve

Achievements and titles
- National finals: 2014 Norwegian Champs; • Javelin throw, 3rd (bronze); 2015 Norwegian Champs; • Javelin throw, 1st (gold); 2018 NCAAs; • Javelin throw, 15th; 2021 NCAAs; • Javelin throw, 1st (gold); 2024 Norwegian Champs; • Javelin throw, 2nd (silver)
- Personal bests: JT: 63.50 m (2024); JT (500g): 52.96 m (2013)
Medal record
Women's athletics
Representing Norway
European Championships
Bronze medal – third place	2024 Rome	Javelin throw
European Throwing Cup
Gold medal – first place	2024 Leiria	Javelin throw
Nordic Junior Championships
Gold medal – first place	2015 Espoo	Javelin throw
- Updated on 29 June 2024

Marie-Therese Obst (born 7 January 1996) is a German-Norwegian javelin thrower. She is a European Championships (2024) bronze medalist and a European Throwing Cup (2024), NCAA (2021) and Norwegian national (2015) champion. Obst has also won the Nordic Junior Championships (2015) and multiple national titles at junior level, in addition to being the Norwegian U20 record holder with a mark of 57.44 metres. She competed in the women's javelin throw at the 2024 Summer Olympics.

== Biography ==
Obst was born in Berlin, Germany, but moved to Moss, Norway when she was 9 years old. She moved to Oslo in 2012 and won her first national gold medal in javelin throw at junior level that same year. She competed in her first international competition at the 2013 World U18 Championships in Athletics, finishing 19th in the qualifying round. At the 2014 European Championships, Obst finished 16th in the qualifying round. She improved significantly at the 2014 World U20 Championships in Athletics, qualifying for the finals and placing 7th. Later that same year, Obst suffered a torn glenoid labrum that would take seven years to recover from. In 2015, she won gold medals at the Norwegian Championships and the Nordic Junior Championships.

After her athletics career in Norway, Obst moved to Athens, Georgia in the fall of 2017 to study Criminal Justice at the University of Georgia and joined the Georgia Bulldogs track and field team. After finishing 18th at the 2018 NCAA Division I Outdoor Track and Field Championships, she achieved her first collegiate national title by winning the 2021 NCAA Division I Outdoor Track and Field Championships with a mark of 59.69 m. Obst finished 3rd at the 2021 European Athletics Team Championships in the First League javelin throw. She moved back to Norway in the summer of 2022. In 2024, Obst won the gold medal at the European Throwing Cup in Leiria and the bronze medal at the European Championships in Rome. She represented Norway in the women's javelin throw at the 2024 Summer Olympics in Paris.

== Personal bests ==
Event	Mark	Place	Competition	Venue	Date
Javelin throw	63.50 m	3rd place, bronze medalist(s)	European Championships	Rome, Italy	11 June 2024
Javelin throw (500 g)	52.96 m	1st place, gold medalist(s)	Nasjonal Kastmønstring	Fredrikstad, Norway	4 May 2013
