= Maria Andrejczyk =

Polish javelin thrower (born 1996)

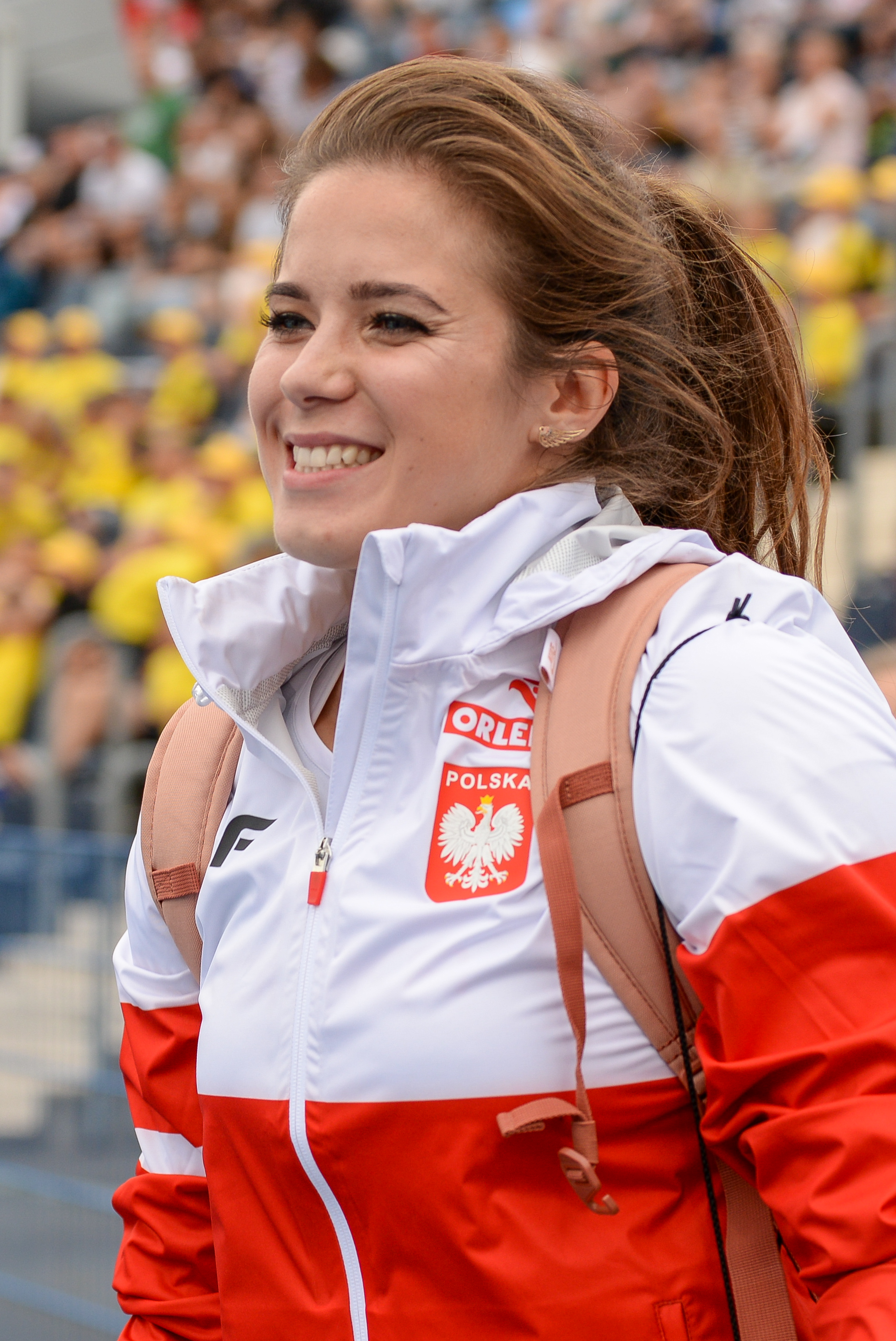
- Andrejczyk in 2019

Personal information
- Full name: Maria Magdalena Andrejczyk
- Born: 9 March 1996 (age 30) Suwałki, Poland
- Height: 1.74 m (5 ft 9 in)
- Weight: 77 kg (170 lb)
- Parents: Tomasz Andrejczyk (father); Małgorzata Andrejczyk (mother)
- Website: maria-andrejczyk.com

Sport
- Sport: Track and field
- Event: Javelin throw
- Club: LUKS Hańcza Suwałki
- Partner: Marcin Rosengarten (since 2018)
- Coached by: Karol Sikorski

Achievements and titles
- Personal bests: NR 71.40 m (2021)
Medal record
Women's athletics
Representing Poland
Olympic Games
Silver medal – second place	2020 Tokyo	Javelin throw
European Junior Championships
Gold medal – first place	2015 Eskilstuna	Javelin throw
- Updated on 12 August 2019

Maria Magdalena Andrejczyk (Polish pronunciation: [ˈmarja anˈdrɛjtʂɨk]; born 9 March 1996) is a Polish track and field athlete who competes in the javelin throw. She is a three-time Olympian and won the silver medal in the javelin throw event at the 2020 Summer Olympics. Andrejczyk is also a European Team Championships silver medalist and European Junior Championships gold medalist. Her personal best throw of 71.40 m, set in 2021, is the Polish record and ranks her fourth on the women's world all-time list.

In the 2025 Polish television series The Breslau Murders, she played the role of Stanisława Walasiewicz.

== Career ==
Andrejczyk competed at the 2015 World Championships in Beijing without qualifying for the final. She won the gold medal at the 2015 European Junior Championships.

Andrejczyk represented Poland at the 2016 Summer Olympics in Rio de Janeiro. On 16 August 2016, she achieved her personal best and a new Polish national record – 67.11 metres – while competing in the qualifying round. She went on to finish fourth in the final, missing out on a bronze medal by just two centimetres.

Soon after the Olympics she underwent an operation on the injured shoulder and lost the entire 2017 season. She returned to competition in June 2018 but could not build a good enough form for the 2018 European Championships in Berlin. The next season marked an improvement as she finished second at the 2019 European Team Championships Super League held on home soil in Bydgoszcz and qualified for the 2019 World Championships in Doha, where, however, she was eliminated in the qualifying round.

In the 2020 Summer Olympics held in Tokyo, Andrejczyk won the silver medal in the women's javelin throw event.

== Personal life ==
Andrejczyk is a Roman Catholic.

Since the end of 2018, She has been in a relationship with the Polish trainer Marcin Rosengarten.

In 2018, Andrejczyk was diagnosed with bone cancer which she survived.

== Philanthropy ==
Andrejczyk auctioned off her Tokyo Olympic silver medal to help fund the heart surgery of an 8-month-old baby. Żabka, a Polish store chain won the auction and let her keep the medal.

== Competition record ==
Year	Competition	Venue	Position	Event	Notes
Representing Poland
2013	World Youth Championships	Donetsk, Ukraine	26th (q)	Javelin throw (500 g)	45.14 m
2014	World Junior Championships	Eugene, United States	5th	Javelin throw	53.66 m
2015	European Junior Championships	Eskilstuna, Sweden	1st	Javelin throw	59.73 m
2015	World Championships	Beijing, China	28th (q)	Javelin throw	56.75 m
2016	European Championships	Amsterdam, Netherlands	13th (q)	Javelin throw	57.93 m
2016	Olympic Games	Rio de Janeiro, Brazil	4th	Javelin throw	64.78 m
2019	World Championships	Doha, Qatar	22nd (q)	Javelin throw	57.68 m
2021	Olympic Games	Tokyo, Japan	2nd	Javelin throw	64.61 m
2022	World Championships	Eugene, United States	21st (q)	Javelin throw	55.47 m
2024	European Championships	Rome, Italy	10th	Javelin throw	58.29 m
2024	Olympic Games	Paris, France	8th	Javelin throw	62.44 m
2026	European Championships	Birmingham, United Kingdom	18th (q)	Javelin throw	55.21 m
