= Arantza Moreno =

Spanish javelin thrower

Personal information
- Full name: Arantza Moreno Fernández
- Born: 16 January 1995 (age 31) Ermua, Basque Country, Spain
- Height: 1. 73 m
- Weight: 67 kg (148 lb)

Sport
- Sport: Athletics
- Event: Javelin throw
- Club: FC Barcelona
- Coached by: José Antonio Garcí

Arantza Moreno Fernández (born 16 January 1995) is a Spanish athlete specialising in the javelin throw. She won a silver medal at the 2018 Ibero-American Championships.

Her personal best in the event is 59.69 metres set in Castellón in 2018.

== International competitions ==
Year	Competition	Venue	Position	Event	Notes
Representing Spain
2011	World Youth Championships	Lille, France	30th (q)	Javelin throw	41.51 m
2013	European Junior Championships	Rieti, Italy	5th	Javelin throw	52.70 m
2014	World Junior Championships	Eugene, United States	8th	Javelin throw	52.08 m
2015	European U23 Championships	Tallinn, Estonia	5th	Javelin throw	55.32 m
2016	European Throwing Cup (U23)	Arad, Romania	3rd	Javelin throw	54.75 m
2017	European U23 Championships	Bydgoszcz, Poland	11th	Javelin throw	54.65 m
2018	European Championships	Berlin, Germany	18th (q)	Javelin throw	56.33 m
2018	Ibero-American Championships	Trujillo, Peru	2nd	Javelin throw	59.37 m
2022	Ibero-American Championships	La Nucía, Spain	7th	Javelin throw	54.13 m
2022	European Championships	Munich, Germany	16th (q)	Javelin throw	56.02 m
2024	Ibero-American Championships	Cuiabá, Brazil	8th	Javelin throw	50.79 m
