= Marcelina Witek =

Polish javelin thrower

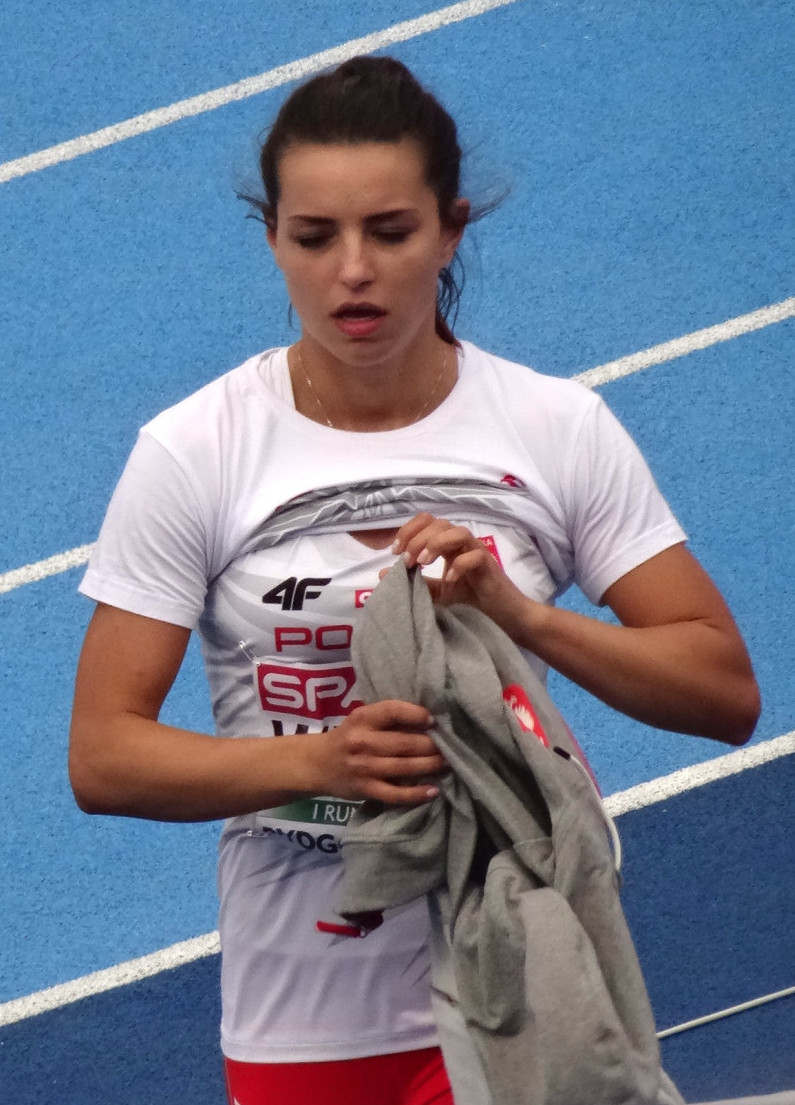
- Marcelina Witek in 2017

Personal information
- Full name: Marcelina Klaudia Witek-Konofał
- Born: 2 June 1995 (age 31) Słupsk, Poland
- Education: Jędrzej Śniadecki Academy
- Height: 1.73 m (5 ft 8 in)
- Weight: 67 kg (148 lb)

Sport
- Sport: Track and field
- Event: Javelin throw
- Club: SKLA Słupsk (2009-2015); SKLA Sopot (2015–2017); KS Polanik Piotrków Trybunalski (2017–)
- Coached by: Mirosław Witek

Achievements and titles
- Personal best: 66.53 m (2018)
Medal record
Women's athletics
Representing Poland
Universiade
Gold medal – first place	2017 Taipei	javelin throw
European U23 Championships
Bronze medal – third place	2017 Bydgoszcz	Javelin throw

Marcelina Klaudia Witek (born 2 June 1995) is a Polish track and field athlete who competes in the javelin throw. Her personal best is 66.53 m, set in 2018. She represented her country at the 2017 World Championships without qualifying for the final. In addition, she won a bronze medal at the 2017 European U23 Championships and a gold at the 2017 Summer Universiade.

== International competitions ==
Year	Competition	Venue	Position	Notes
Representing Poland
2011	World Youth Championships	Lille, France	23rd (q)	44.71 m
2013	European Junior Championships	Rieti, Italy	8th	51.29 m
2014	World Junior Championships	Eugene, United States	4th	54.14 m
2015	European Cup Winter Throwing (U23)	Leiria, Portugal	3rd	54.25 m
2015	European U23 Championships	Tallinn, Estonia	10th	50.38 m
2016	European Championships	Amsterdam, Netherlands	22nd (q)	55.03 m
2017	European U23 Championships	Bydgoszcz, Poland	3rd	63.03 m
2017	World Championships	London, United Kingdom	22nd (q)	59.00 m
2017	Universiade	Taipei, Taiwan	1st	63.31 m
2024	European Championships	Rome, Italy	12th	55.42 m
