= Andrea Železná =

Czech javelin throwerer

Personal information
- Born: Andrea Drápalová; 4 July 1993 (age 32)

Sport
- Sport: Athletics
- Event: Javelin throw

Achievements and titles
- Personal best(s): Javelin: 60.88 (Gabarone, 2025)

Andrea Železná (née Drápalová; born 4 July 1993) is a Czech javelin thrower. She has won the Czech Athletics Championships and competed at the European Athletics Championships. She is married to former javelin thrower Jan Železný.

== Biography ==
Železná threw over 60 metres for the first time in Kladno in May 2024. She made her major championships debut at the 2024 European Athletics Championships in Rome, Italy, where she threw 55.75 metres for eighteenth place.

Železná set a new personal best throwing 60.88 metres at the Golden Grand Prix in Gaborone, Botswana, in April 2025. She won the Czech Athletics Championships for the first time in August 2025. She competed as part of the Czech team at the 2025 World Athletics Championships in Tokyo, Japan, in September 2025, but did not advance to the final.

In March 2026, whilst training in South Africa, she suffered a groin injury which ruled her out of the 2026 season.

== Personal life ==
She is the wife of Czech former javelin thrower Jan Železný with the pair having married in Nymburk in 2019. They have one son, Sebastian. He has acted as her throwing coach.
