= Liveta Jasiūnaitė =

Lithuanian javelin thrower (born 1994)

Personal information
- Nationality: Lithuanian
- Born: 26 July 1994 (age 31)

Sport
- Country: Lithuania
- Sport: Track and field
- Event: Javelin throw
Medal record
Women's athletics
Representing Lithuania
European Championships
Bronze medal – third place	2018 Berlin	Javelin throw

Liveta Jasiūnaitė (born 26 July 1994) is a Lithuanian athlete who specialises in the javelin throw. She was a bronze medalist at the 2018 European Athletics Championships. She has competed at multiple major championships, including the 2020 and 2024 Olympic Games. Jasiūnaite holds the Lithuanian record in javelin throw.

== Career ==
She attended Lithuanian Sports University (LSU). She had a long-time partnership with coach Terese Nekrošaite, before Jasiūnaitė went to the United States, where she was coached in Alabama by Lithuanian-American Tomas Paukštys. Later, she returned to Lithuania and found herself working with LSU Sports Center coach Indre Jokubaitytė.

In 2011, she won the silver medal at the European Youth Summer Olympic Festival in Turkey. In 2012, she finished eighth at the World U20 Championship in Barcelona. In 2015, she won the bronze medal at the European Athletics U23 Championships in Tallinn, Estonia.

She competed in the javelin throw event at the 2016 European Championships in Amsterdam, Netherlands, reaching the final and placing twelfth overall. She was a bronze medalist at the 2018 European Athletics Championships in Berlin. She won the World University Summer Games in 2019 in Naples. She finished in seventh place at the delayed 2020 Olympic Games held in Tokyo, Japan, in 2021, with a best throw of 60.06 metres.

She finished sixth at the 2022 European Athletics Championships in Munich with a best throw of 58.95 metres. She won the Lithuanian Athletics Championships in 2023 with a best throw of 55.26 metres. She completed at the 2023 World Athletics Championships in Budapest, Hungary, without reaching the final.

In June 2024, she competed in the javelin throw at the 2024 European Athletics Championships in Rome, Italy, managing a distance of 53.85 metres without proceeding to the final. On 20 June, she threw over 62 metres in Kaunas. Later that month, she retained her Lithuanian national title at the Lithuanian Athletics Championships with a throw of 59.35 metres. She competed in the javelin at the 2024 Summer Olympics in Paris, France in August 2024, throwing 58.35 metres, and did not progress to the final.

She finished in eighth place at the 2025 Xiamen Diamond League with a best throw of 58.33 metres in April 2025.

== Personal life ==
In 2024, she became engaged to fellow athlete Edgaras Benkunskas.

== International competitions ==
Year	Competition	Venue	Position	Event	Notes
Representing Lithuania
2011	World Youth Championships	Lille, France	16th (q)	Javelin throw	46.32 m
2011	European Youth Olympic Festival	Trabzon, Turkey	2nd	Javelin throw	52.00 m
2012	World Junior Championships	Barcelona, Spain	8th	Javelin throw	53.00 m
2013	European Junior Championships	Rieti, Italy	9th	Javelin throw	51.27 m
2015	European U23 Championships	Tallinn, Estonia	3rd	Javelin throw	55.77 m
2016	European Championships	Amsterdam, Netherlands	12th	Javelin throw	53.94 m
2017	World Championships	London, United Kingdom	26th (q)	Javelin throw	55.80 m
2017	Universiade	Taipei, Taiwan	7th	Javelin throw	57.25 m
2018	European Championships	Berlin, Germany	3rd	Javelin throw	61.59 m
2019	Universiade	Naples, Italy	1st	Javelin throw	60.36 m
2019	World Championships	Doha, Qatar	23rd (q)	Javelin throw	56.90 m
2021	Olympic Games	Tokyo, Japan	7th	Javelin throw	60.06 m
2022	World Championships	Eugene, United States	10th	Javelin throw	58.97 m
2022	European Championships	Munich, Germany	6th	Javelin throw	58.95 m
2023	World Championships	Budapest, Hungary	14th (q)	Javelin throw	59.00 m
2024	European Championships	Rome, Italy	17th (q)	Javelin throw	55.85 m
2024	Olympic Games	Paris, France	25th (q)	Javelin throw	58.35 m

== Personal bests ==
=== Outdoor ===
Event	Record	Venue	Date
Javelin throw	63.98 (NR)	Ogre, Latvia	15 June 2019
