= Monique Cilione =

Australian javelin thrower

Personal information
- Born: 19 November 1994 (age 31) Keilor, Victoria, Australia

Sport
- Country: Australia
- Sport: Track and field
- Event: Javelin throw
Medal record
Track and field
Representing Australia
World Youth Championships
Bronze medal – third place	2011 Lille	Girls' javelin throw

Monique Cilione (born 19 November 1994) is an Australian javelin thrower who competes in international level events. Her highest achievement is winning a bronze medal at the 2011 World Youth Championships in Athletics in Lille.
