= Sofi Flink =

Swedish track and field athlete

Personal information
- Full name: Ida Sofi Emilia Flink
- Nationality: Swedish
- Born: 8 July 1995 (age 30) Hallstahammar, Sweden
- Height: 1.68 m (5 ft 6 in)
- Weight: 71 kg (157 lb)

Sport
- Country: Sweden
- Sport: Athletics
- Event: Javelin throw

Achievements and titles
- Personal bests: NR 61.96 m (2013)
Medal record
Women's athletics
Representing Sweden
World Junior Championships
Gold medal – first place	2012 Barcelona	Javelin throw
Silver medal – second place	2014 Oregon	Javelin throw
European Junior Championships
Gold medal – first place	2013 Rieti	Javelin throw
World Youth Championships
Silver medal – second place	2011 Lille Métropole	Javelin throw

Ida Sofi Emilia Flink (born 8 July 1995) is a Swedish track and field athlete who competes in the javelin throw. Her personal best throw of 61.96 m is the Swedish women's record.

== Career ==
Flink won silver at her first international competition, the 2011 World Youth Championships. In 2012, she won gold at the World Junior Championships. In July 2013, she won gold at the European Junior Championships. The next month she competed at the 2013 World Championships, her first senior international competition. She set a personal best and Swedish record of 61.96 m to advance through the qualification round then finished tenth in the final with a 59.52 m throw.

In July 2014, Flink sought to defend her title at the World Junior Championships. She ultimately finished second, losing her title to Ekaterina Starygina. In August, she competed at the 2014 European Championships, where she made it through the qualification round and finished twelfth in the final.

Flink next competed at the 2016 European Championships. She finished twenty-third in the qualification round and did not advance to the final. She participated in the 2017 European U23 Championships, where she failed to register a valid throw in the qualifiers.

== Competition record ==
Year	Competition	Venue	Position	Notes
Representing Sweden
2011	World Youth Championships	Lille Métropole, France	2nd	52.25 m
2012	World Junior Championships	Barcelona, Spain	1st	61.40 m
2013	European Junior Championships	Rieti, Italy	1st	57.91 m
2013	World Championships	Moscow, Russia	10th	59.52 m
2014	World Junior Championships	Eugene, United States	2nd	56.70 m
2014	European Championships	Zürich, Switzerland	12th	56.68 m
2016	European Championships	Amsterdam, Netherlands	23rd (q)	54.38 m
2017	European U23 Championships	Bydgoszcz, Poland	–	NM
2018	European Championships	Berlin, Germany	10th	56.91 m
