= Eda Tuğsuz =

Turkish javelin thrower (born 1997)

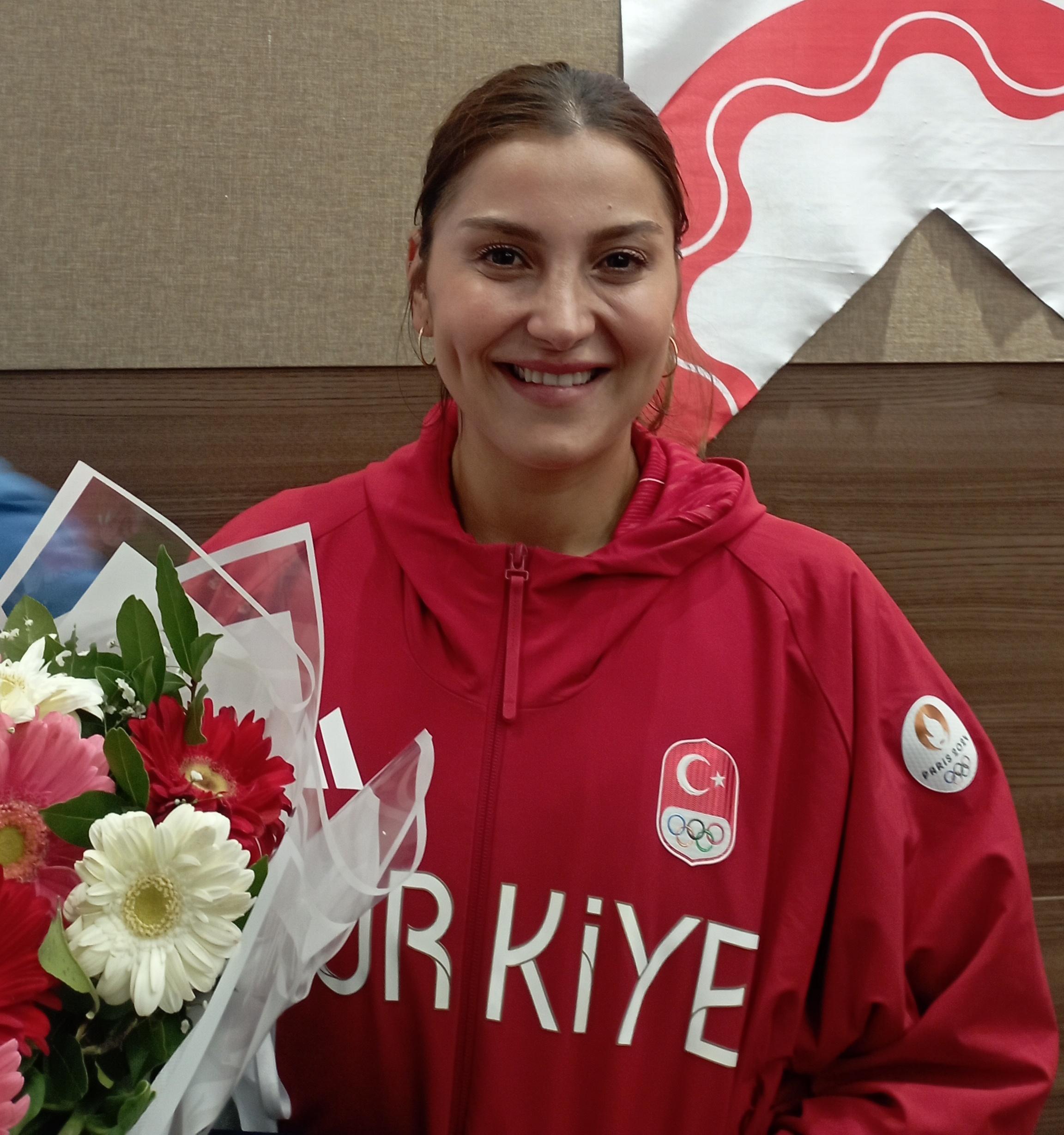

Personal information
- Nationality: Turkish
- Born: 27 March 1997 (age 29) Antalya, Turkey

Sport
- Country: Turkey
- Sport: Track and field
- Event: Javelin throw

Achievements and titles
- Personal best: 67.21 m
Medal record
Islamic Solidarity Games
| Gold medal – first place | 2017 Baku | Javelin throw |
| Silver medal – second place | 2021 Konya | Javelin throw |
| Bronze medal – third place | 2025 Riyadh | Javelin throw |
European U23 Championships
| Silver medal – second place | 2019 Gävle | Javelin throw |
Summer World University Games
| Gold medal – first place | 2021 Chengdu | Javelin throw |
| Bronze medal – third place | 2019 Naples | Javelin throw |

Eda Tuğsuz (born 27 March 1997) is a Turkish track and field athlete who competes in the javelin throw.

== Career ==
She competed in the javelin throw at the 2016 European Championships in Amsterdam, Netherlands. In 2013, she won at the European Youth Summer Olympic Festival. Tuğsuz holds Turkish record with a throw of 67.21 m. She won the bronze medal at the 2019 Summer Universiade held in Naples, Italy.

== Personal bests ==
| Discipline | Performance | Place | Date |
|---|---|---|---|
| Javelin throw | 67.21 m | Baku | 18 May 2017 |

== International competitions ==
| Year | Competition | Venue | Position | Event | Notes |
Representing Turkey
| 2017 | World Championships | London, United Kingdom | 5th | Javelin throw | 64.52 m |
| 2019 | World Championships | Doha, Qatar | 20th (q) | Javelin throw | 52.28 m |
| 2021 | Olympic Games | Tokyo, Japan | 4th | Javelin throw | 64.00 m |
| 2022 | Mediterranean Games | Oran, Algeria | 2nd | Javelin throw | 59.30 m |
| 2022 | World Championships | Eugene, United States | – | Javelin throw | NM |
| 2022 | European Championships | Munich, Germany | 15th (q) | Javelin throw | 56.33 m |
| 2023 | World University Games | Chengdu, China | 1st | Javelin throw | 59.05 m |
| 2023 | World Championships | Budapest, Hungary | – | Javelin throw | NM |
| 2024 | European Championships | Rome, Italy | 20th (q) | Javelin throw | 53.29 m |
| 2024 | Olympic Games | Paris, France | 31st (q) | Javelin throw | 55.30 m |
| 2025 | Islamic Solidarity Games | Riyadh, Saudi Arabia | 3rd | Javelin throw | 55.58 m |
| 2026 | European Championships | Birmingham, United Kingdom | 28th (q) | Javelin throw | 51.29 m |
| 2026 | Mediterranean Games | Taranto, Italy | 6th | Javelin throw | 59.75 m |
(q) Indicates overall position in qualifying round
