= Serbia at the 2026 European Athletics Championships =

- Flag of Serbia
- WA code: SRB

in Birmingham, United Kingdom 10–16 August 2026
- Competitors: 13 (4 men and 9 women)
- Medals: Gold 0 Silver 0 Bronze 1 Total 1

European Athletics Championships appearances (overview)
- 2006; 2010; 2012; 2014; 2016; 2018; 2022; 2024; 2026

Serbia competed at the 2026 European Athletics Championships in Birmingham, United Kingdom from 10–16 August 2026.

== Medallists ==
Medal	Name	Event	Date
Bronze	Adriana Vilagoš	Women's javelin throw	16 August

== Results ==
Serbia entered the following athletes.

Key

- Q = Qualified for the next round
- q = Qualified for the next round as a fastest loser or, in field events, by position without achieving the qualifying target
- NR = National record
- PB = Personal best
- SB = Season best
- N/A = Round not applicable for the event

Track and road events

Athlete	Event	Heat		Semifinal		Final	
Athlete	Event	Result	Rank	Result	Rank	Result	Rank
Darijo Bašić Palković	Men's 200 m	21.17	18	Did not advance			
Mihajlo Katanić	Men's 400 m hurdles	49.66 =PB	8 q	49.61 PB	17	Did not advance	
Aleksandra Pešić	Women's 400 m	52.55 PB	16	Did not advance			
Milica Emini	Women's 100 m hurdles	13.86	22	Did not advance			
Mina Stanković	Women's half marathon walk	—N/a				1:38:10	17

Field events
Men

Athlete	Event	Qualification		Final	
Athlete	Event	Distance	Position	Distance	Position
Luka Bošković	Long jump	8.33	2 Q	8.08	5
Armin Sinančević	Shot put	20.20	5 q	20.02	8

Women

Athlete	Event	Qualification		Final	
Athlete	Event	Distance	Position	Distance	Position
Angelina Topić	High jump	1.91	1 Q	1.83	12
Milica Gardašević	Long jump	6.50	19	Did not advance	
Aleksandrija Mitrović	Triple jump	13.93	15	Did not advance	
Ivana Španović	Triple jump	14.21	7 Q	14.06	8
Adriana Vilagoš	Javelin throw	57.25	10 q	60.93	3rd place, bronze medalist(s)
Marija Vučenović	Javelin throw	54.90	19	Did not advance	
