= 2021 World Athletics U20 Championships – Women's javelin throw =

Women's javelin throw at the 2021 World Athletics U20 Championships
- Venue: Kasarani Stadium
- Dates: 19 August
- Competitors: 14 from 12 nations
- Winning distance: 61.46 m

Medalists
| gold medal | Adriana Vilagoš | Serbia |
| silver medal | Elina Tzengko | Greece |
| bronze medal | Yiselena Ballar Rojas | Cuba |

The women's javelin throw at the 2021 World Athletics U20 Championships was held at the Kasarani Stadium on 19 August.

== Records ==
Standing records prior to the 2021 World Athletics U20 Championships
| World U20 Record | Yulenmis Aguilar (CUB) | 63.86 | Edmonton, Canada | 2 August 2015 |
| Championship Record | Vera Rebrik (UKR) | 63.01 | Bydgoszcz, Poland | 10 July 2008 |
| World U20 Leading | Elina Tzengko (GRE) | 61.42 | Smederevo, Serbia | 26 June 2021 |

== Results ==
=== Final ===
The final was held on 19 August at 14:40.

| Rank | Name | Nationality | Round | | | | | | Mark | Notes |
| Rank | Name | Nationality | 1 | 2 | 3 | 4 | 5 | 6 | Mark | Notes |
|---|---|---|---|---|---|---|---|---|---|---|
| 1st place, gold medalist(s) | Adriana Vilagoš | Serbia | 61.46 | 58.95 | 58.25 | 59.51 | 58.18 | 56.28 | 61.46 | WU20L |
| 2nd place, silver medalist(s) | Elina Tzengko | Greece | 57.91 | 56.29 | 54.83 | 52.95 | x | 59.60 | 59.60 | |
| 3rd place, bronze medalist(s) | Yiselena Ballar Rojas | Cuba | 54.54 | 48.51 | 55.13 | 53.44 | 55.48 | 51.77 | 55.48 | |
| 4 | Rhema Otabor | Bahamas | 47.61 | 55.08 | 49.42 | 45.84 | 49.86 | 48.67 | 55.08 | NU20R |
| 5 | Valentina Barrios | Colombia | 50.79 | 46.44 | 52.51 | 54.43 | 48.05 | 54.30 | 54.43 | PB |
| 6 | Mckayla van der Westhuizen | South Africa | 50.46 | 50.03 | 52.31 | 53.94 | 51.58 | x | 53.94 | |
| 7 | Veronika Šokota | Croatia | 52.60 | 50.37 | x | 53.81 | x | 53.20 | 53.81 | |
| 8 | Esra Türkmen | Turkey | 44.52 | 49.49 | 51.10 | 45.42 | 53.20 | 51.78 | 53.20 | |
| 9 | Vivian Suominen | Finland | 49.13 | x | 48.86 | | | | 49.13 | |
| 10 | Petra Sičaková | Czech Republic | 48.60 | x | x | | | | 48.60 | |
| 11 | Anni-Linnea Alanen | Finland | 47.73 | 48.25 | 47.46 | | | | 48.25 | |
| 12 | Selma Davulcu | Turkey | 46.82 | 42.15 | 44.42 | | | | 46.82 | |
| 13 | Eniko Sara | Canada | 45.58 | x | x | | | | 45.58 | |
| 14 | Martha Nthanze Musai | Kenya | 33.09 | 45.13 | 34.82 | | | | 45.13 | |
