= 2023 European Athletics U23 Championships – Women's javelin throw =

Women's javelin throw at the 2023 European Athletics U23 Championships
- Venue: Leppävaara Stadium
- Location: Espoo, Finland
- Dates: 14 July (qualification); 16 July (final)
- Competitors: 21 from 14 nations
- Winning distance: 60.73 m

Medalists
gold medal	Elina Tzengko	Greece
silver medal	Gedly Tugi	Estonia
bronze medal	Anni-Linnea Alanen	Finland

The women's javelin throw event at the 2023 European Athletics U23 Championships was held in Espoo, Finland, at Leppävaara Stadium on 14 and 16 July.

== Records ==
Prior to the competition, the records were as follows:

European U23 record	Sara Kolak (CRO)	68.43 m	Lausanne, Switzerland	6 July 2017
Championship U23 record	Christin Hussong (GER)	65.60 m	Tallinn, Estonia	11 July 2015

== Results ==
=== Qualification ===
Qualification rules: All athletes over 56.50 m (Q) or at least 12 best (q) advanced to the final.

Rank	Group	Name	Nationality	#1	#2	#3	Mark	Notes
1	A	Elina Tzengko	Greece	61.52			61.52	Q
2	B	Anni-Linnea Alanen	Finland	53.15	60.37		60.37	Q
3	B	Gedly Tugi	Estonia	59.99			59.99	Q
4	B	Małgorzata Maślak	Poland	55.46	55.45	56.02	56.02	q
5	A	Esra Türkmen	Turkey	55.77	54.74	53.74	55.77	q
6	B	Ivana Đurić	Serbia	55.18			55.18	q
7	A	Emilia Karell	Finland	x	51.58	54.84	54.84	q, PB
8	B	Lauren Farley	Great Britain	54.60	x	50.46	54.60	q
9	A	Gabriela Andrukonis	Lithuania	48.50	50.57	53.44	53.44	q
10	A	Erika Lukach	Ukraine	x	47.93	52.60	52.60	q
11	A	Federica Botter	Italy	52.56	51.08	51.71	52.56	q
12	B	Münevver Hanci	Turkey	50.49	51.26	51.43	51.43	q
13	B	Margherita Randazzo	Italy	50.49	51.26	51.43	51.43	
14	A	Adele Toniutto	Italy	45.50	45.48	50.27	50.27	
15	A	Petra Sičaková	Czech Republic	49.52	50.20	46.54	50.20	
16	B	Siiri Elomaa	Turkey	46.42	49.07	44.06	49.07	
17	B	Sanija Ozoliņa	Latvia	48.69	45.44	x	48.69	
18	B	Jade Maraval	France	47.03	48.48	47.91	48.48	
19	A	Nina Rman	Slovenia	48.13	44.01	48.39	48.39	

=== Final ===
Rank	Name	Nationality	#1	#2	#3	#4	#5	#6	Mark	Notes
1st place, gold medalist(s)	Elina Tzengko	Greece	56.45	x	59.24	x	x	60.73	60.73	
2nd place, silver medalist(s)	Gedly Tugi	Estonia	x	54.72	53.76	57.62	x	x	57.62	
3rd place, bronze medalist(s)	Anni-Linnea Alanen	Finland	56.67	53.36	55.45	53.66	x	50.45	56.67	
4	Małgorzata Maślak	Poland	x	56.48	x	52.17	x	53.17	56.48	
5	Emilia Karell	Finland	55.33	49.12	x	x	50.23	48.22	55.33	PB
6	Gabriela Andrukonis	Lithuania	52.34	x	55.04	x	x	x	55.04	
7	Erika Lukach	Ukraine	42.57	54.31	53.34	x	x	50.38	54.31	
8	Federica Botter	Italy	53.72	x	49.15	52.51	x	47.09	53.72	
9	Ivana Đurić	Serbia	49.51	53.08	51.56				53.08	
10	Lauren Farley	Great Britain	52.34	x	49.71				52.34	
11	Esra Türkmen	Turkey	46.49	49.33	50.15				50.15	
12	Münevver Hanci	Turkey	48.22	49.95	x				49.95	
