= Serbia at the 2022 European Athletics Championships =

- Flag of Serbia
- WA code: SRB
- National federation: Athletics Federation of Serbia

in Munich, Germany 15 August 2022 – 21 August 2022
- Competitors: 14 (7 men and 7 women) in 11 events
- Medals Ranked 13th: Gold 1 Silver 2 Bronze 1 Total 4

European Athletics Championships appearances (overview)
- 2006; 2010; 2012; 2014; 2016; 2018; 2022; 2024; 2026

Serbia competed at the 2022 European Athletics Championships in Munich, Germany, between 15 and 21 August 2022

== Medallists ==
Medal	Name	Event	Date
Gold	Ivana Vuleta	Women's long jump	18 August
Silver	Armin Sinančević	Men's shot put	15 August
Silver	Adriana Vilagoš	Women's javelin throw	20 August
Bronze	Angelina Topić	Women's high jump	21 August

== Results ==
Serbia entered the following athletes.

Key

- Q = Qualified for the next round
- q = Qualified for the next round as a fastest loser or, in field events, by position without achieving the qualifying target
- NR = National record
- PB = Personal best
- SB = Season best
- N/A = Round not applicable for the event

=== Men ===
Track and road events

Athlete	Event	Heat		Semifinal		Final	
Athlete	Event	Result	Rank	Result	Rank	Result	Rank
Boško Kijanović	400 m	45.75	8 Q	45.88	14	Did not advance	
Elzan Bibić	5000 m	—N/a				13:39.60	18
Luka Trgovčević	110 m hurdles	14.01	21	Did not advance			

Field events

Athlete	Event	Qualification		Final	
Athlete	Event	Distance	Position	Distance	Position
Lazar Anić	Long jump	7.86	4 q	7.37	11
Strahinja Jovančević	Long jump	7.34	19	Did not advance	
Armin Sinančević	Shot put	21.82 SB	1 Q	21.39	2nd place, silver medalist(s)
Asmir Kolašinac	Shot put	19.99	11 q	20.15	8

=== Women ===
Track and road events

Athlete	Event	Heat		Semifinal		Final	
Athlete	Event	Result	Rank	Result	Rank	Result	Rank
Milana Tirnanić	100 m	11.57	14 q	DQ		Did not advance	
Anja Lukić	100 m hurdles	13.63	19	Did not advance			

Field events

Athlete	Event	Qualification		Final	
Athlete	Event	Distance	Position	Distance	Position
Angelina Topić	High jump	1.87	1 q	1.93	3rd place, bronze medalist(s)
Milica Gardašević	Long jump	6.83 =PB	3 Q	6.52	7
Ivana Vuleta	Long jump	6.67	4 q	7.06 =SB	1st place, gold medalist(s)
Dragana Tomašević	Discus throw	55.51	20	Did not advance	
Adriana Vilagoš	Javelin throw	57.70	9 q	62.01	2nd place, silver medalist(s)
