= 2025 European Athletics U23 Championships – Women's javelin throw =

Women's javelin throw at the 2025 European Athletics U23 Championships
- Venue: Fana Stadion
- Location: Bergen, Norway
- Dates: 17 July (qualification); 19 July (final)
- Competitors: 25 from 17 nations
- Winning distance: 62.41 m

Medalists
gold medal	Adriana Vilagoš	Serbia
silver medal	Petra Sicaková	Czech Republic
bronze medal	Mira Lukas	Germany

The women's javelin throw event at the 2025 European Athletics U23 Championships was held in Bergen, Norway, at Fana Stadion on 17 and 19 July.

== Records ==
Prior to the competition, the records were as follows:

Record	Athlete (nation)	Distance (m)	Location	Date
European U23 record	Sara Kolak (CRO)	68.43 m	Lausanne, Switzerland	6 July 2017
Championship U23 record	Christin Hussong (GER)	65.60 m	Tallinn, Estonia	11 July 2015

== Results ==
=== Qualification ===
All athletes over 55.00 m (Q) or at least the 12 best performers (q) advance to the final.

==== Group A ====
Place	Athlete	Nation	#1	#2	#3	Result	Notes
1	Petra Sicaková	Czech Republic	56.08			56.08 m	Q
2	Emilia Karell	Finland	50.65	x	55.08	55.08 m	Q
3	Mirja Lukas	Germany	54.10	52.44	49.55	54.10 m	q
4	Ellevine Skare	Norway	50.86	50.48	52.17	52.17 m	q
5	Fanni Kövér	Hungary	47.57	48.99	51.19	51.19 m	q
6	Jenice Koller	Switzerland	48.22	50.91	46.43	50.91 m	q
7	Leonie Hügli	Switzerland	50.91	44.74	45.16	50.91 m	q
8	Siiri Elomaa	Finland	46.78	45.13	49.44	49.44 m	
9	Johanna Ader	Estonia	49.25	49.16	40.09	49.25 m	
10	Amanda Olsson	Sweden	x	48.04	47.50	48.04 m	
11	Federica Dozio	Italy	44.06	44.39	42.67	44.39 m	
12	Kalliopi Meimari	Greece	x	43.95	x	43.95 m	

==== Group B ====
Place	Athlete	Nation	#1	#2	#3	Result	Notes
1	Adriana Vilagoš	Serbia	58.64			58.64 m	Q
2	Elizabeth Korczak	Great Britain	52.34	53.69	51.48	53.69 m	q
3	Malin Karell	Finland	51.38	52.93	52.15	52.93 m	q, PB
4	Inga Reimers	Norway	42.10	51.16	x	51.16 m	q
5	Arndís Diljá Óskarsdóttir	Iceland	45.20	51.05	48.53	51.05 m	q
6	Blanka Kállai-Kiss	Hungary	43.69	50.82	48.13	50.82 m	
7	Paula Rodríguez	Spain	50.04	49.12	x	50.04 m	
8	Irenie Theodorou	Cyprus	43.29	48.98	x	48.98 m	
9	Sabrina Boss	Switzerland	47.47	48.30	48.63	48.63 m	
10	Eleonora Tsogka	Greece	48.18	x	43.79	48.18 m	
11	Christiana Ellina	Cyprus	46.80	47.92	47.15	47.92 m	
12	Julia Rohrer	Liechtenstein	43.78	x	47.80	47.80 m	
13	Camilla Urup Colstrup	Denmark	46.10	47.56	45.96	47.56 m	

=== Final ===
Place	Name	Nationality	#1	#2	#3	#4	#5	#6	Mark	Notes
1st place, gold medalist(s)	Adriana Vilagoš	Serbia	59.11	61.26	58.09	58.44	60.74	62.41	62.41	
2nd place, silver medalist(s)	Petra Sicaková	Czech Republic	53.00	51.79	54.16	57.17	58.14	54.91	58.14	
3rd place, bronze medalist(s)	Mirja Lukas	Germany	53.70	57.19	x	53.38	54.22	57.22	57.22	
4	Emilia Karell	Finland	55.58	51.51	51.15	53.99	50.69	52.77	55.58	
5	Jenice Koller	Switzerland	51.33	54.70	52.68	x	r		54.70	PB
6	Malin Karell	Finland	48.66	49.59	53.06	x	52.72	53.59	53.06	PB
7	Elizabeth Korczak	Great Britain	47.43	x	53.03	51.22	51.66	51.37	53.03	
8	Inga Reimers	Norway	46.93	49.50	51.79	x	x	47.42	51.79	PB
9	Fanni Kövér	Hungary	48.25	49.89	51.14				51.14	
10	Leonie Hügli	Switzerland	50.99	49.20	49.66				50.99	
11	Ellevine Skare	Norway	45.06	x	49.69				49.69	
12	Arndís Diljá Óskarsdóttir	Iceland	43.16	46.26	x				46.26	
