= 2026 European Athletics Championships – Women's javelin throw =

Women's javelin throw at the 2026 European Athletics Championships
- Venue: Alexander Stadium
- Location: Birmingham, United Kingdom
- Dates: 14 August 2026 (qualification); 16 August 2026 (final)
- Winning distance: 62.43 m

Medalists
| gold medal | Sara Kolak | Croatia |
| silver medal | Julia Ulbricht | Germany |
| bronze medal | Adriana Vilagoš | Serbia |

The women's javelin throw at the 2026 European Athletics Championships took place over two rounds at the Alexander Stadium in Birmingham, United Kingdom, on 14 and 16 August 2026.

== Background ==
Records before the 2026 European Athletics Championships
| Record | Athlete (nation) | Distance | Location | Date |
|---|---|---|---|---|
| World record | Barbora Špotáková (CZE) | 72.28 m | Stuttgart, Germany | 13 September 2008 |
| World leading | Yan Ziyi (CHN) | 71.74 m | Xiamen, China | 23 May 2026 |
| Championship record | Christin Hussong (GER) | 67.90 m | Berlin, Germany | 10 August 2018 |
| European record | Barbora Špotáková (CZE) | 72.28 m | Stuttgart, Germany | 13 September 2008 |
| European leading | Sigrid Borge (NOR) | 65.00 m | Xiamen, China | 23 May 2026 |

== Qualification ==
The qualification period was from 27 July 2025 to 26 July 2026. Athletes qualified by running the entry standard of 60.80 m or longer, or by their position on the World Athletics Rankings for the event. The target number was 30 athletes.

Qualification standings per 31 July 2026
| QP | CP | Country | Athlete | Status | Details |
|---|---|---|---|---|---|
| 1 | 1 | Serbia | Adriana Vilagoš | Qualified by Entry Standard | 66.06 - National Stadium, Tokyo (JPN) - 19 SEP 2025 |
| 2 | 1 | Norway | Sigrid Borge | Qualified by Entry Standard | 65.00 - Egret Stadium, Xiamen (CHN) - 23 MAY 2026 |
| 3 | 1 | Latvia | Anete Sietiņa | Qualified by Entry Standard | 64.64 - National Stadium, Tokyo (JPN) - 20 SEP 2025 |
| 4 | 1 | Greece | Elina Tzengko | Qualified by Entry Standard | 64.57 - Letzigrund, Zürich (SUI) - 28 AUG 2025 |
| 5 | 1 | Poland | Maria Andrejczyk | Qualified by Entry Standard | 62.78 - Stadion Podskarbińska, Warszawa (POL) - 07 JUN 2026 |
| 6 | 1 | Croatia | Sara Kolak | Qualified by Entry Standard | 62.61 - Mestský Stadion, Ostrava (CZE) - 16 JUN 2026 |
| 7 | 1 | Switzerland | Leonie Hügli | Qualified by Entry Standard | 62.18 - Stadion Allmend, Luzern (SUI) - 16 JUL 2026 |
| 8 | 1 | Spain | Yulenmis Aguilar | Qualified by Entry Standard | 61.83 - Estadio de Larrabide, Pamplona (ESP) - 13 JUN 2026 |
| 9 | 2 | Poland | Małgorzata Maślak-Glugla | Qualified by Entry Standard | 61.79 - National Stadium, Tokyo (JPN) - 19 SEP 2025 |
| 10 | 1 | France | Alizée Minard | Qualified by Entry Standard | 61.69 - Stadium Municipal, Albi (FRA) - 24 JUL 2026 |
| 11 | 1 | Germany | Julia Ulbricht | Qualified by Entry Standard | 61.58 - Lohrheidestadion, Wattenscheid, Bochum (GER) - 26 JUL 2026 |
| 12 | 1 | Czech Republic | Nikol Tabačková | Qualified by Entry Standard | 61.44 - Sportzentrum Niederösterreich, St. Pölten (AUT) - 04 JUN 2026 |
| 13 | 2 | Serbia | Marija Vučenović | Qualified by Entry Standard | 61.10 - Atletski Stadion, Kraljevo (SRB) - 02 AUG 2025 |
| 14 | 1 | Turkey | Esra Türkmen | Qualified by Entry Standard | 61.10 - Panthessaliko Stadium, Volos (GRE) - 20 JUN 2026 |
| 15 | 2 | Czech Republic | Petra Sičaková | Qualified by Entry Standard | 60.98 - Mestský Stadion Sletište, Kladno (CZE) - 09 JUN 2026 |
| 16 | 1 | Estonia | Gedly Tugi | Qualified by Entry Standard | 60.90 - Kalevi Keskstaadion, Tallinn (EST) - 11 JUL 2026 |
| 17 | 2 | Switzerland | Sabrina Boss | Qualified by Entry Standard | 60.88 - Letzigrund, Zürich (SUI) - 25 JUL 2026 |
| 18 | 3 | Czech Republic | Nikola Ogrodníková | Qualified by World Rankings | 13th - 1121 points |
| 19 | 2 | Norway | Marie-Therese Obst | Qualified by World Rankings | 15th - 1115 points |
| 20 | 2 | Croatia | Vita Barbić | Qualified by World Rankings | 21st - 1076 points |
| 21 | 1 | Finland | Emilia Karell | Qualified by World Rankings | 22nd - 1069 points |
| 22 | 2 | Turkey | Eda Tuğsuz | Qualified by World Rankings | 25th - 1061 points |
| 23 | 1 | Great Britain & N.I. | Freya Jones | Qualified by World Rankings | 26th - 1058 points |
| 24 | 2 | Germany | Luisa Tremel | Qualified by World Rankings | 28th - 1054 points |
| 25 | 1 | Italy | Paola Padovan | Qualified by World Rankings | 29th - 1053 points |
| 26 | 2 | Finland | Rebecca Nelimarkka | Qualified by World Rankings | 30th - 1048 points |
| 27 | 1 | Hungary | Annabella Bogdán | Qualified by World Rankings | 31st - 1048 points |
| 28 | 3 | Norway | Kaja Mørch Pettersen | Qualified by World Rankings | 32nd - 1043 points |
| 29 | 3 | Finland | Jatta-Mari Jääskeläinen | Qualified by World Rankings | 36th - 1024 points |
| 30 | 1 | Sweden | Beatrice Lantz | Qualified by World Rankings | 37th - 1024 points |
| reserve | 2 | Italy | Federica Botter | Next best by World Rankings | 40th - 1020 points |
| reserve | 1 | Lithuania | Orinta Navikaitė | Next best by World Rankings | 43rd - 1013 points |
| reserve | 3 | Italy | Adele Toniutto | Next best by World Rankings | 44th - 1010 points |
| reserve | 3 | Serbia | Ivana Đurić | Next best by World Rankings | 47th - 1002 points |
| reserve | 1 | Cyprus | Christiana Ellina | Next best by World Rankings | 53rd - 981 points |
| reserve | 4 | Italy | Margherita Randazzo | Next best by World Rankings | 62nd - 964 points |
| reserve | 2 | Cyprus | Irenie Jane Theodorou | Next best by World Rankings | 70th - 949 points |

| Bye to semi-finals | Reserve activated | Withdrawal / reserve unused |

== Schedule ==
| Date | Time | Round |
|---|---|---|
| 14 August 2026 | 10:40 | Qualification |
| 16 August 2026 | 19:55 | Final |

All times are local times (UTC+1)

== Results ==
=== Qualification ===
The qualification round was held on 14 August 2026, at 10:39 in the afternoon. All athletes meeting the Qualification Standard (Q) of 61.00 m or at least 12 best performers (q) advanced to the final.

==== Group A ====
| Place | Athlete | Nation | Round | | | Result | Notes |
| Place | Athlete | Nation | #1 | #2 | #3 | Result | Notes |
|---|---|---|---|---|---|---|---|
| 1 | Leonie Hügli | Switzerland | 58.90 | 59.52 | 62.33 | 62.33 m | Q, NR |
| 2 | Julia Ulbricht | Germany | 60.86 | 59.76 | x | 60.86 m | q |
| 3 | Sara Kolak | Croatia | 58.13 | x | 60.82 | 60.82 m | q |
| 4 | Elina Tzengko | Greece | 59.82 | x | 55.56 | 59.82 m | q, SB |
| 5 | Małgorzata Maślak-Glugla | Poland | x | 50.50 | 58.14 | 58.14 m | q |
| 6 | Sigrid Borge | Norway | 57.22 | 55.87 | 56.94 | 57.22 m | q |
| 7 | Anete Sietiņa | Latvia | 56.24 | x | x | 56.24 m | |
| 8 | Gedly Tugi | Estonia | 54.89 | 56.09 | 52.60 | 56.09 m | |
| 9 | Nikola Ogrodníková | Czech Republic | 55.44 | 54.86 | 55.87 | 55.87 m | |
| 10 | Marija Vučenović | Serbia | 54.90 | x | x | 54.90 m | |
| 11 | Freya Jones | Great Britain & N.I. | 52.22 | 53.93 | x | 53.93 m | |
| 12 | Jatta-Mari Jääskeläinen | Finland | 53.72 | 52.52 | x | 53.72 m | |
| 13 | Nikol Tabačková | Czech Republic | x | 52.41 | 52.32 | 52.41 m | |
| 14 | Eda Tuğsuz | Turkey | 51.29 | x | x | 51.29 m | |
| — | Marie-Therese Obst | Norway | x | x | x | NM | |

==== Group B ====
| Place | Athlete | Nation | Round | | | Result | Notes |
| Place | Athlete | Nation | #1 | #2 | #3 | Result | Notes |
|---|---|---|---|---|---|---|---|
| 1 | Esra Türkmen | Turkey | 55.07 | 60.43 | 52.79 | 60.43 m | q |
| 2 | Yulenmis Aguilar | Spain | 59.85 | 56.97 | - | 59.85 m | q |
| 3 | Luisa Tremel | Germany | 51.02 | x | 58.32 | 58.32 m | q |
| 4 | Alizée Minard | France | 58.26 | 54.11 | 54.56 | 58.26 m | q |
| 5 | Adriana Vilagoš | Serbia | 50.73 | x | 57.25 | 57.25 m | q |
| 6 | Paola Padovan | Italy | 47.43 | 53.04 | 56.90 | 56.90 m | q |
| 7 | Petra Sičaková | Czech Republic | 53.12 | 53.05 | 56.09 | 56.09 m | |
| 8 | Sabrina Boss | Switzerland | 51.59 | 55.22 | 51.60 | 55.22 m | |
| 9 | Maria Andrejczyk | Poland | 55.21 | 53.62 | x | 55.21 m | |
| 10 | Kaja Mørch Pettersen | Norway | 54.50 | x | x | 54.50 m | |
| 11 | Emilia Karell | Finland | 52.40 | 54.38 | x | 54.38 m | |
| 12 | Annabella Bogdán | Hungary | 48.98 | 54.35 | 48.10 | 54.35 m | |
| 13 | Rebecca Nelimarkka | Finland | x | 49.34 | 53.75 | 53.75 m | |
| 14 | Vita Barbić | Croatia | 53.11 | 51.73 | 53.52 | 53.52 m | |
| 15 | Beatrice Lantz | Sweden | x | 51.06 | 50.32 | 51.06 m | |

=== Final ===
The final was held on 16 August 2026, at 19:55 in the evening.

| Place | Athlete | Nation | Round | | | | | | Result | Notes |
| Place | Athlete | Nation | #1 | #2 | #3 | #4 | #5 | #6 | Result | Notes |
|---|---|---|---|---|---|---|---|---|---|---|
| 1st place, gold medalist(s) | Sara Kolak | Croatia | 62.43 | 59.17 | 58.67 | 57.84 | 60.49 | 61.37 | 62.43 m | |
| 2nd place, silver medalist(s) | Julia Ulbricht | Germany | 61.53 | 56.14 | x | x | x | x | 61.53 m | |
| 3rd place, bronze medalist(s) | Adriana Vilagoš | Serbia | 54.02 | 60.93 | 56.65 | 52.49 | 56.14 | 56.65 | 60.93 m | |
| 4 | Sigrid Borge | Norway | 59.55 | x | 59.98 | x | 58.09 | x | 59.98 m | |
| 5 | Alizée Minard | France | 59.20 | 58.51 | 56.46 | 59.19 | x | 59.81 | 59.81 m | |
| 6 | Esra Türkmen | Turkey | 53.87 | 56.16 | 59.29 | 56.06 | 53.83 | 57.40 | 59.29 m | |
| 7 | Paola Padovan | Italy | 58.91 | 52.60 | 56.28 | 53.62 | x | x | 58.91 m | PB |
| 8 | Małgorzata Maślak-Glugla | Poland | 58.51 | x | x | x | x | x | 58.51 m | |
| 9 | Yulenmis Aguilar | Spain | 55.62 | 57.06 | 55.78 | | | | 57.06 m | |
| 10 | Leonie Hügli | Switzerland | x | 54.55 | 50.03 | | | | 54.55 m | |
| 11 | Elina Tzengko | Greece | x | 53.09 | 54.01 | | | | 54.01 m | |
| 12 | Luisa Tremel | Germany | 53.19 | 51.34 | x | | | | 53.19 m | |
