= Serbia at the 2024 European Athletics Championships =

- Flag of Serbia
- WA code: SRB

in Rome, Italy 7 June 2024 – 12 June 2024
- Competitors: 17 (9 men and 8 women)
- Medals Ranked 20th: Gold 0 Silver 2 Bronze 0 Total 2

European Athletics Championships appearances (overview)
- 2006; 2010; 2012; 2014; 2016; 2018; 2022; 2024; 2026

Serbia competed at the 2024 European Athletics Championships in Rome, Italy from 7–12 June 2024.

== Medallists ==
Medal	Name	Event	Date
Silver	Angelina Topić	Women's high jump	9 June
Silver	Adriana Vilagoš	Women's javelin throw	11 June

== Results ==
Serbia entered the following athletes.

Key

- Q = Qualified for the next round
- q = Qualified for the next round as a fastest loser or, in field events, by position without achieving the qualifying target
- NR = National record
- PB = Personal best
- SB = Season best
- N/A = Round not applicable for the event

=== Men ===
Track and road events

Athlete	Event	Heat		Semifinal		Final	
Athlete	Event	Result	Rank	Result	Rank	Result	Rank
Aleksa Kijanović	100 metres	10.54	21	Did not advance			
Boško Kijanović	400 metres	46.39	18	Did not advance			
Elzan Bibić	5000 metres	—N/a				13:24.54	6
Nikola Kostić	400 metres hurdles	50.48	15	Did not advance			

Field events

Athlete	Event	Qualification		Final	
Athlete	Event	Distance	Position	Distance	Position
Slavko Stević	High jump	2.12	22	Did not advance	
Lazar Anić	Long jump	7.88 SB	18	Did not advance	
Strahinja Jovančević	Long jump	7.95	12 q	7.62	10
Asmir Kolašinac	Shot put	19.19	18	Did not advance	
Armin Sinančević	Shot put	NM		Did not advance	

=== Women ===
Track and road events

Athlete	Event	Heat		Semifinal		Final	
Athlete	Event	Result	Rank	Result	Rank	Result	Rank
Ivana Ilić	100 metres	11.62	20	Did not advance			
Ivana Ilić	200 metres	23.49 SB	14	Did not advance			
Maja Ćirić	400 metres	52.96	18	Did not advance			
Milica Emini	100 metres hurdles	13.24	13	Did not advance			

Field events

Athlete	Event	Qualification		Final	
Athlete	Event	Distance	Position	Distance	Position
Angelina Topić	High jump	1.92	5 Q	1.97	2nd place, silver medalist(s)
Milica Gardašević	Long jump	6.55	17	Did not advance	
Angelina Topić	Long jump	6.29	26	Did not advance	
Ivana Đurić	Javelin throw	50.23	30	Did not advance	
Adriana Vilagoš	Javelin throw	60.57	3 Q	64.42 EU23L	2nd place, silver medalist(s)
Marija Vučenović	Javelin throw	59.90 SB	6 q	58.30	9
