= Alida van Daalen =

Dutch athlete (born 2002)

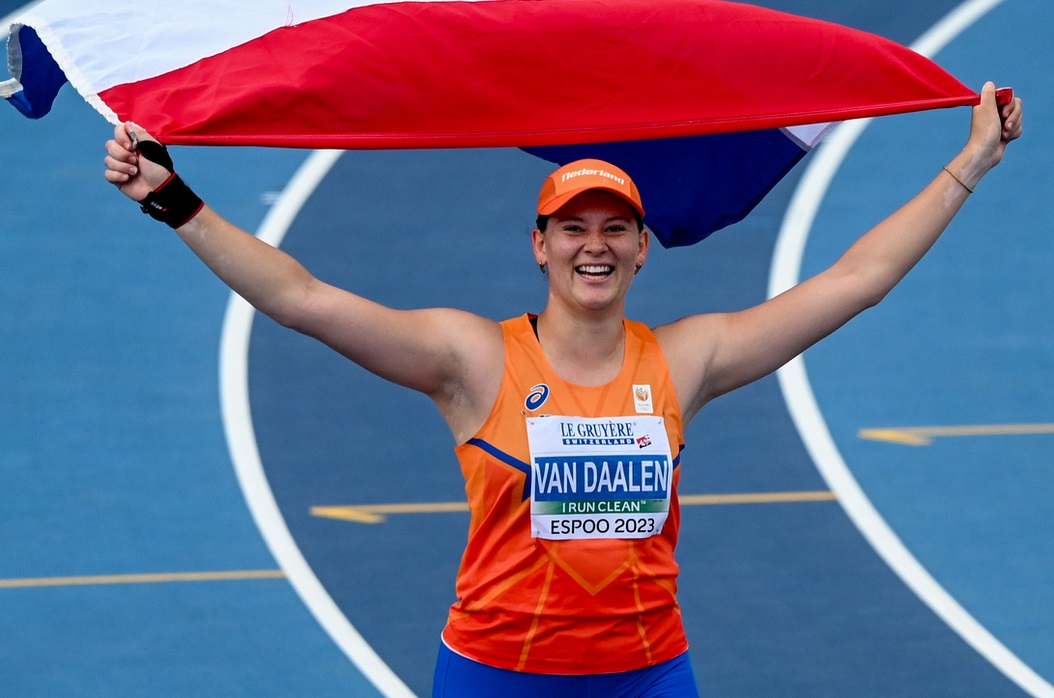
- Van Daalen in 2023

Personal information
- Nationality: Dutch
- Born: 12 April 2002 (age 24) Rotterdam, Netherlands
- Height: 1.88 m (6 ft 2 in)

Sport
- Sport: Athletics
- Events: Shot Put, Discus
Medal record
Women's athletics
Representing Netherlands
European U23 Championships
Gold medal – first place	2023 Espoo	Shot put
Gold medal – first place	2023 Espoo	Discus throw
European U20 Championships
Gold medal – first place	2019 Borås	Discus throw
Silver medal – second place	2021 Tallinn	Shot put
Silver medal – second place	2021 Tallinn	Discus throw
European U18 Championships
Silver medal – second place	2018 Győr	Discus throw
Bronze medal – third place	2018 Győr	Shot put

Alida van Daalen (Dutch: [aːˈlidaː vɑn ˈdaːlə(n)]; born 12 April 2002) is a Dutch track and field athlete who competes in shot put and discus.

== Early life ==
Alida van Daalen was born on 12 April 2002. She is the daughter of Dutch Olympic athlete Jacqueline Goormachtigh.

Van Daalen was brought up in initially in Suriname, but lives with the pigment disease vitiligo, which causes her skin to show white spots and does not tolerate the sun well, and her family relocated to Rotterdam.

In 2022, she started at the University of Florida in the United States and began competing for the Florida Gators. She won the shot put at the SEC Indoor Championships and SEC Outdoor Championships and placed fourth at NCAA Division I Indoor Championships and NCAA Outdoor Championships.

== Career ==
Van Daalen competed at the 2018 Youth Olympics in Buenos Aires, Argentina. She then won bronze in the shot put and silver in the discus, at the 2018 European Athletics U18 Championships in Győr.

Competing at the 2021 European Athletics U20 Championships in Tallinn, Estonia, she won the silver medal in the shot put and the discus events.

Competing at the European Athletics U23 Championships in Espoo, Finland, she won the gold medal in both the shot put and the discus events. She won the shot put with a European U23 leading distance of 18.32m. She was selected for the 2023 World Athletics Championships in Budapest in August 2023.

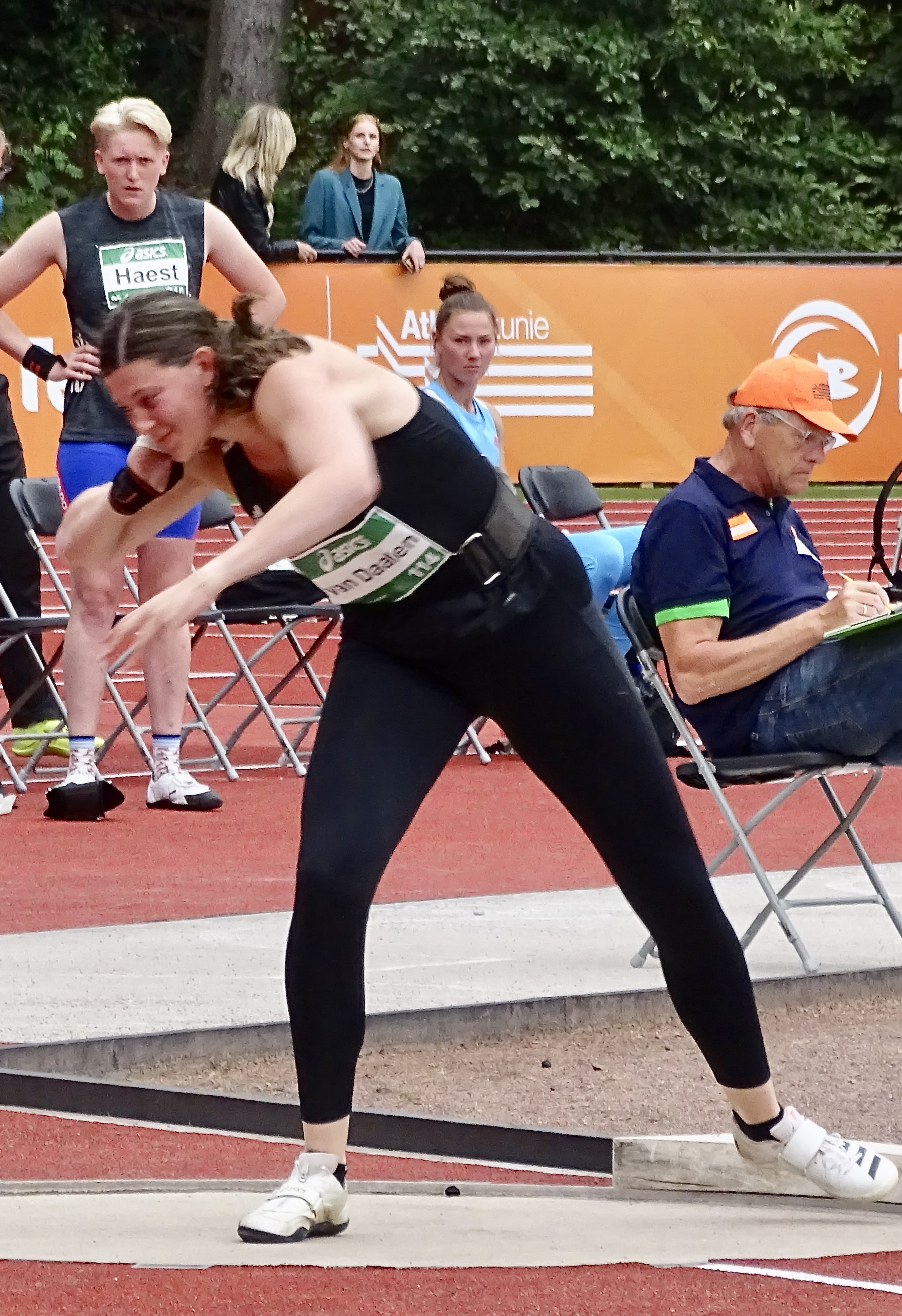
Competing in 2022

She competed at the 2024 Summer Olympics in Paris in the shot put and discus.

She set a meeting record of 65.24 metres to win the discus at the 2025 SEC Championships in May 2025. In September 2025, she competed at the 2025 World Athletics Championships in Tokyo, Japan, reaching the final and placing eleventh overall.

On 9 April 2026 in Ramona, Oklahoma, she set a new personal best for the discus throw of 67.99 metres. On 12 April, she improved again to 69.17m in Ramona. In May, she won the discus throw at the SEC Championships, before throwing 69.31m in the NCAA East Regional at Lexington, to move to third on the all-time collegiate list behind Jorinde van Klinken and Jayden Ulrich. On 13 June, she set a new meeting record to win the women's discus with a throw of 65.98 meters at the 2026 NCAA Outdoor Championships. On 3 July, she placed third overall in the discus throw at the 2026 Prefontaine Classic. Competing at the 2026 European Championships in Birmingham in August, van Daalen, was fourth with 64.22m in the discus throw. At the championships she was also a finalist in the women's shot put.

== Statistics ==
Information based on her World Athletics profile unless noted otherwise.

=== Personal bests ===
Outdoor

- Shot put: 18.32 m (Espoo, 2023)
- Discus throw: 69.31m. (Lexington, Kentucky, 2026)

Indoor

- Shot put: 18.66 m i (Fayetteville, Arkansas, 2023)

=== International competitions ===
Representing the Netherlands
Year	Competition	Venue	Position	Event	Result	Notes
2017	European Youth Summer Olympic Festival	Győr, Hungary	1st	Shot put (3 kg)	16.23 m	
2017	European Youth Summer Olympic Festival	Győr, Hungary	2nd	Discus throw	48.82 m	
2018	European U18 Championships	Győr, Hungary	3rd	Shot put (3kg)	17.08 m	
2018	European U18 Championships	Győr, Hungary	2nd	Discus throw	52.93 m	
2018	Summer Youth Olympics	Buenos Aires, Argentina	4th	Discus throw	47.33 m 53.07 m	
2019	European U20 Championships	Borås, Sweden	1st	Discus throw	55.92 m	
2021	European Throwing Cup	Split, Croatia	17th	Discus throw	54.99 m	
2021	European U20 Championships	Tallinn, Estonia	2nd	Discus throw	55.63 m	
2021	European U20 Championships	Tallinn, Estonia	2nd	Shot put	16.56 m	
2022	European Throwing Cup, U23 Events	Leiria, Portugal	5th	Shot put	15.80 m	
2022	European Throwing Cup, U23 Events	Leiria, Portugal	2nd	Discus throw	55.02 m	
2022	European Championships	Munich, Germany	18th	Discus throw	56.05 m	
2023	European U23 Championships	Espoo, Finland	1st	Shot put	18.32 m	
2023	European U23 Championships	Espoo, Finland	1st	Discus throw	56.77 m	
2023	World Championships	Budapest, Hungary	19th (q)	Shot put	17.93 m	
2024	Olympic Games	Paris, France	26th (q)	Shot put	16.53 m	
2024	Olympic Games	Paris, France	16th (q)	Discus throw	62.19 m	
2025	World Championships	Tokyo, Japan	9th	Discus throw	62.24 m	
2026	European Championships	Birmingham, United Kingdom	4th	Discus throw	64.22 m	
