= Alizée Minard =

French athlete (born 1997)

Personal information
- Born: 6 May 1997 (age 29) Bayonne, France
- Height: 177 cm (5 ft 10 in)
- Weight: 70 kg (154 lb)

Sport
- Country: France
- Sport: Athletics
- Event: Javelin throw

Achievements and titles
- Personal best: Javelin: 61.69m (2026)
Medal record
Women's athletics
Representing France
Mediterranean Games
Bronze medal – third place	2022 Oran	Javelin throw

Alizée Minard (born 6 May 1997) is a French javelin thrower. She is a multiple-time French national champion.

== Biography ==
As a junior athlete, she competed in pole vault, winning age-group regional titles in Aquitaine. She was later a member of Club Athlétique Balmanais and focused on the javelin throw.

Competing for Arizona State University and trained in the javelin throw by coach Brian Blutreich, she won the 2021 PAC-12 Championships, and finished as runner-up at the 2021 NCAA Championships with a throw of 57.91 metres, although a partially torn UCL in her elbow limited her to only four competitions in the United States that year. Later that summer, she finished as runner-up at the 2021 French Athletics Championships.

Minard won the javelin at the 2022 French Athletics Championships in Caen, with a throw of 57.17 metres. She won the bronze medal at the 2022 Mediterranean Games, moving into the medal positions with her final throw of the competition. She represented France at the 2022 European Athletics Championships in Germany.

In February 2023, she won the French Winter Throwing Championships in Salon-de-Provence, with a throw of 53.80 metres. In June 2023, she placed tenth overall representing France at the 2023 European Athletics Team Championships First Division in Poland.

In June 2024, Minard won the javelin at the French Athletics Championships in Angers, with a throw of 55.95 metres. That month, she won the National de Strasbourg meeting ahead of Asian champion Annu Rani, with a throw of 57.77 metres.

Minard placed sixth overall at the 2025 European Athletics Team Championships First Division in Madrid. She retained her national title by winning the javelin throw at the 2025 French Athletics Championships in Talence, with a personal best throw of 60.65 metres to finish ahead of Jade Maraval.

Minard threw a new personal best of 61.51 metres to place fourth overall at the 2026 Meeting de Paris, part of the 2026 Diamond League. On 24 July, she threw a new personal best and championship record 61.69 metres to win the French Championships. In August, she competed at the 2026 European Athletics Championships in Birmingham, England, in the javelin throw, placing fifth overall.
