= Leonie Hügli =

Swiss javelin thrower (born 2005)

Personal information
- Nationality: Swiss
- Born: 11 April 2005 (age 21)

Sport
- Sport: Athletics
- Event: Javelin

Achievements and titles
- Personal bests: Javelin: 62.18 m (2026) NR

Leonie Hügli (born 11 April 2005) is a Swiss javelin thrower. In 2026, she set the Swiss national record at the discipline, with a throw of 62.18 metres.

== Biography ==
From Bern, and a member of LC Kirchberg, Hügli placed tenth overall in the javelin throw at the 2024 World Athletics U20 Championships in Lima, Peru. She also placed tenth the following summer at the 2025 European Athletics U23 Championships in Bergen, Norway, and placed second at the senior 2025 Swiss Athletics Championships in August.

Hügli had a breakthrough season in the women’s javelin in 2026, having started the year with a personal best of 51.98 metres. She threw 53.42 metres to place second to Sabrina Boss at the Swiss Winter Throwing Championships in February 2026 and placed tenth the following month representing Switzerland at the 2026 European Throwing Cup in Nicosia, Greece, with 53.62 metres. She threw a new Swiss national record of 61.94 metres competing in Halle in May. Her throw the first by a Swiss woman over 60 metres and surpassing the previous best mark set by Géraldine Ruckstuhl. Competing at the Boris Hanzekovic Memorial in Zagreb, a World Athletics Continental Tour Gold meeting on 26 June, she threw over 60 metres again, winning with 61.14 metres ahead of Adriana Vilagos. On 16 July, she won at Spitzen Leichtathletik Luzern with a new Swiss record of 62.18 metres. In August, she competed at the 2026 European Athletics Championships in Birmingham, England, placing tenth in the final.
