= Serbia at the European Athletics Championships =

Sporting event delegation

- WA code: SRB
- National federation: Athletics Federation of Serbia
- Website: sas.rs
- Medals Ranked 38th: Gold 2 Silver 8 Bronze 4 Total 14

European Athletics Championships appearances (overview)
- 2006; 2010; 2012; 2014; 2016; 2018; 2022; 2024; 2026

Serbia officially has competed at the European Athletics Championships since 2006. Before Serbia has competed as part of SFR Yugoslavia and Serbia and Montenegro.

== Medal count ==
Edition	Gold	Silver	Bronze	Total	Rank
2006 Gothenburg	0	1	0	1	23
2010 Barcelona	0	0	0	0	-
2012 Helsinki	0	1	1	2	20
2014 Zurich	0	2	0	2	17
2016 Amsterdam	1	0	1	14	2
2018 Berlin	0	0	0	0	-
2022 Munich	1	2	1	4	13
2024 Rome	0	2	0	2	20
2026 Birmingham	0	0	1	1	25
Total	2	8	4	14	38
