= 2022 World Athletics U20 Championships – Women's javelin throw =

Women's javelin throw at the 2022 World Athletics U20 Championships
- Venue: Estadio Olímpico Pascual Guerrero
- Dates: 1 August (qualification); 2 August (final)
- Competitors: 16 from 13 nations
- Winning distance: 63.52

Medalists
gold medal	Adriana Vilagoš	Serbia
silver medal	Valentina Barrios	Colombia
bronze medal	Manuela Rotundo	Uruguay

The women's javelin throw at the 2022 World Athletics U20 Championships was held at the Estadio Olímpico Pascual Guerrero on 1 and 2 August.

18 athletes from 13 countries were entered to the competition, however 16 of them competed.

== Records ==
Standing records prior to the 2022 World Athletics U20 Championships
World U20 Record	Yulenmis Aguilar (CUB)	63.86	Edmonton, Canada	2 August 2015
Championship Record	Vera Rebrik (UKR)	63.01	Bydgoszcz, Poland	10 July 2008
World U20 Leading	Adriana Vilagoš (SRB)	62.76	Sremska Mitrovica, Serbia	11 June 2022

== Results ==
=== Qualification ===
The qualification started on 1 August at 09:05. Athletes attaining a mark of at least 54.50 metres ( Q ) or at least the 12 best performers ( q ) qualified for the final.

Rank	Name	Nationality	Round			Mark	Notes
Rank	Name	Nationality	1	2	3	Mark	Notes
1	Adriana Vilagoš	Serbia	58.87			58.87	Q
2	Momoko Tsuji	Japan	52.23	56.07		56.07	Q
3	Mckyla van der Westhuizen	South Africa	54.92			54.92	Q
4	Veronika Šokota	Croatia	48.12	53.34	-	53.34	q
5	Fanni Kövér	Hungary	52.73	x	-	52.73	q
6	Christina Lahrs	Germany	52.72	45.94	x	52.72	q
7	Valentina Barrios	Colombia	52.53	49.26	x	52.53	q
8	Aoi Murakami	Japan	50.60	52.38	49.82	52.38	q
9	Manuela Rotundo	Uruguay	46.89	52.28	x	52.28	q
10	Emilia Karell	Finland	52.19	x	x	52.19	q
11	Mackenzie Mielczarek	Australia	50.16	48.40	50.07	50.16	q
12	Vivian Suominen	Finland	46.81	48.03	48.89	48.89	q
13	Alyssa John	Germany	48.13	x	46.87	48.13	
14	Stefani Navarro da Silva	Brazil	47.60	47.73	x	47.73	
15	Sanija Ozoliņa	Latvia	42.51	47.45	x	47.45	
16	Elizabeth Bailey	United States	41.99	40.95	x	41.99	

=== Final ===
The final started on 2 August on 17:23.

Rank	Name	Nationality	Round						Mark	Notes
Rank	Name	Nationality	1	2	3	4	5	6	Mark	Notes
1st place, gold medalist(s)	Adriana Vilagoš	Serbia	60.66	63.34	63.52	55.03	-	60.39	63.52	CR
2nd place, silver medalist(s)	Valentina Barrios	Colombia	51.67	53.36	56.39	57.84	57.62	50.88	57.84	NU20R
3rd place, bronze medalist(s)	Manuela Rotundo	Uruguay	52.96	50.98	53.20	49.43	53.77	55.11	55.11	
4	Veronika Šokota	Croatia	54.35	54.47	52.43	x	48.90	x	54.47	
5	Fanni Kövér	Hungary	51.91	54.03	53.09	54.38	x	52.62	54.38	
6	Momoko Tsuji	Japan	52.96	51.76	50.79	53.65	53.82	52.59	53.82	
7	Mckyla van der Westhuizen	South Africa	53.44	52.71	53.36	x	x	51.38	53.44	
8	Emilia Karell	Finland	51.41	49.91	53.26	47.85	48.76	49.05	53.26	
9	Mackenzie Mielczarek	Australia	49.43	52.50	52.94				53.94	
10	Aoi Murakami	Japan	51.60	51.44	x				51.60	
11	Vivian Suominen	Finland	46.65	51.26	x				51.26	
12	Christina Lahrs	Germany	50.55	50.26	x				50.55	
13	Sanija Ozoliņa	Latvia	42.16	41.62	x				42.16	
