= Julia Ulbricht =

German javelin thrower (born 2000)

Personal information
- Born: 28 November 2000 (age 25)

Sport
- Sport: Athletics
- Event: Javelin
Medal record
Women's athletics
Representing Germany
European Championships
Silver medal – second place	2026 Birmingham	Javelin throw
European U20 Championships
Silver medal – second place	2019 Borås	Javelin throw

Julia Ulbricht (born 28 November 2000) is a German javelin thrower. She won the German Athletics Championships in 2026 and the silver medal at the 2026 European Championships.

== Biography ==
Ulbricht threw personal best 54.77 m to place fourth at the 2017 IAAF World U18 Championships in Nairobi. She won the silver medal in the javelin throw at the 2019 European Athletics U20 Championships in Sweden.

Ulbricht won the German Athletics Championships in July 2026 with a personal best throw of 61.58 metres. She was a finalist representing Germany at the 2026 European Athletics Championships in Birmingham, England, winning the silver medal on 16 August with a throw of 61.53 metres in the first round of the competition.
