= Athletics at the 2018 Summer Youth Olympics – Girls' discus throw =

Girls' discus throw at the III Summer Youth Olympic Games
- Venue: Parque Polideportivo Roca
- Date: 11, 14 October
- Competitors: 15 from 15 nations

Medalists
1st place, gold medalist(s)		Melany Matheus	Cuba
2nd place, silver medalist(s)		Violetta Ignatyeva	Russia
3rd place, bronze medalist(s)		Özlem Becerek	Turkey

The girls' discus throw competition at the 2018 Summer Youth Olympics was held on 11 and 14 October, at the Parque Polideportivo Roca.

== Schedule ==
All times are in local time (UTC-3).

Date	Time	Round
Thursday, 11 October 2018	14:35	Stage 1
Sunday, 14 October 2018	15:50	Stage 2

== Results ==
=== Stage 1 ===
Rank	Athlete	Nation	1	2	3	4	Result	Notes
1	Melany Matheus	Cuba	50.39	52.90	53.70	46.06	53.70	
2	Violetta Ignatyeva	Russia	52.41	53.47	49.63	x	53.47	
3	Özlem Becerek	Turkey	47.94	51.90	x	51.33	51.90	
4	Liu Quantong	China	x	49.36	x	50.30	50.30	
5	Pia Northoff	Germany	49.33	43.24	47.07	49.08	49.33	
6	Sofia Kessidi	Greece	x	x	49.14	x	49.14	PB
7	Diletta Fortuna	Italy	x	47.60	48.42	x	48.42	
8	Alida van Daalen	Netherlands	44.38	47.33	x	46.76	47.33	
9	Ulada Zhavarankava	Belarus	x	46.18	x	44.07	46.18	
10	Dolly Gabri	Canada	42.17	42.62	45.20	42.14	45.20	
11	Sally Shokry	Australia	39.18	35.66	41.96	44.56	44.56	
12	Rana Khaled Mahmoud	Egypt	44.26	x	43.55	x	44.26	
13	Elena Defrère	Belgium	x	44.01	x	x	44.01	
14	Dahiana López	Uruguay	42.22	x	x	40.77	42.22	
15	Breann Young	Belize	28.85	29.13	30.25	x	30.25	

=== Stage 2 ===
Rank	Athlete	Nation	1	2	3	4	Result	Notes
1	Melany Matheus	Cuba	53.28	x	54.95	52.22	54.95	
2	Violetta Ignatyeva	Russia	54.28	54.32	52.30	52.39	54.32	
3	Alida van Daalen	Netherlands	50.55	50.60	x	53.07	53.07	
4	Özlem Becerek	Turkey	45.76	47.53	51.96	50.71	51.96	
5	Liu Quantong	China	47.69	49.36	45.54	46.95	49.36	
6	Sofia Kessidi	Greece	48.38	47.56	x	x	48.38	
7	Ulada Zhavarankava	Belarus	32.37	46.74	47.46	43.51	47.46	
8	Sally Shokry	Australia	38.50	x	46.32	46.79	46.79	
9	Pia Northoff	Germany	46.21	43.11	44.44	x	46.21	
10	Diletta Fortuna	Italy	x	44.48	45.09	45.95	45.95	
11	Dahiana López	Uruguay	42.29	45.94	44.93	44.57	45.94	PB
12	Dolly Gabri	Canada	x	x	x	44.87	44.87	
13	Rana Khaled Mahmoud	Egypt	44.69	43.53	36.80	44.15	44.69	
14	Elena Defrère	Belgium	44.01	x	x	x	44.01	
15	Breann Young	Belize	21.18	x	x	x	21.18	

=== Final placing ===
Rank	Athlete	Nation	Stage 1	Stage 2	Total
1st place, gold medalist(s)	Melany Matheus	Cuba	53.70	54.95	108.65
2nd place, silver medalist(s)	Violetta Ignatyeva	Russia	53.47	54.32	107.79
3rd place, bronze medalist(s)	Özlem Becerek	Turkey	51.90	51.96	103.86
4	Alida van Daalen	Netherlands	47.33	53.07	100.40
5	Liu Quantong	China	50.30	49.36	99.66
6	Sofia Kessidi	Greece	49.14	48.38	97.52
7	Pia Northoff	Germany	49.33	46.21	95.54
8	Diletta Fortuna	Italy	48.42	45.95	94.37
9	Ulada Zhavarankava	Belarus	46.18	47.46	93.64
10	Sally Shokry	Australia	44.56	46.79	91.35
11	Dolly Gabri	Canada	45.20	44.87	90.07
12	Rana Khaled Mahmoud	Egypt	44.26	44.69	88.95
13	Dahiana López	Uruguay	42.22	45.94	88.16
14	Elena Defrère	Belgium	44.01	44.01	88.02
15	Breann Young	Belize	30.25	21.18	51.43
