= Elina Tzengko =

Greek javelin thrower (born 2002)

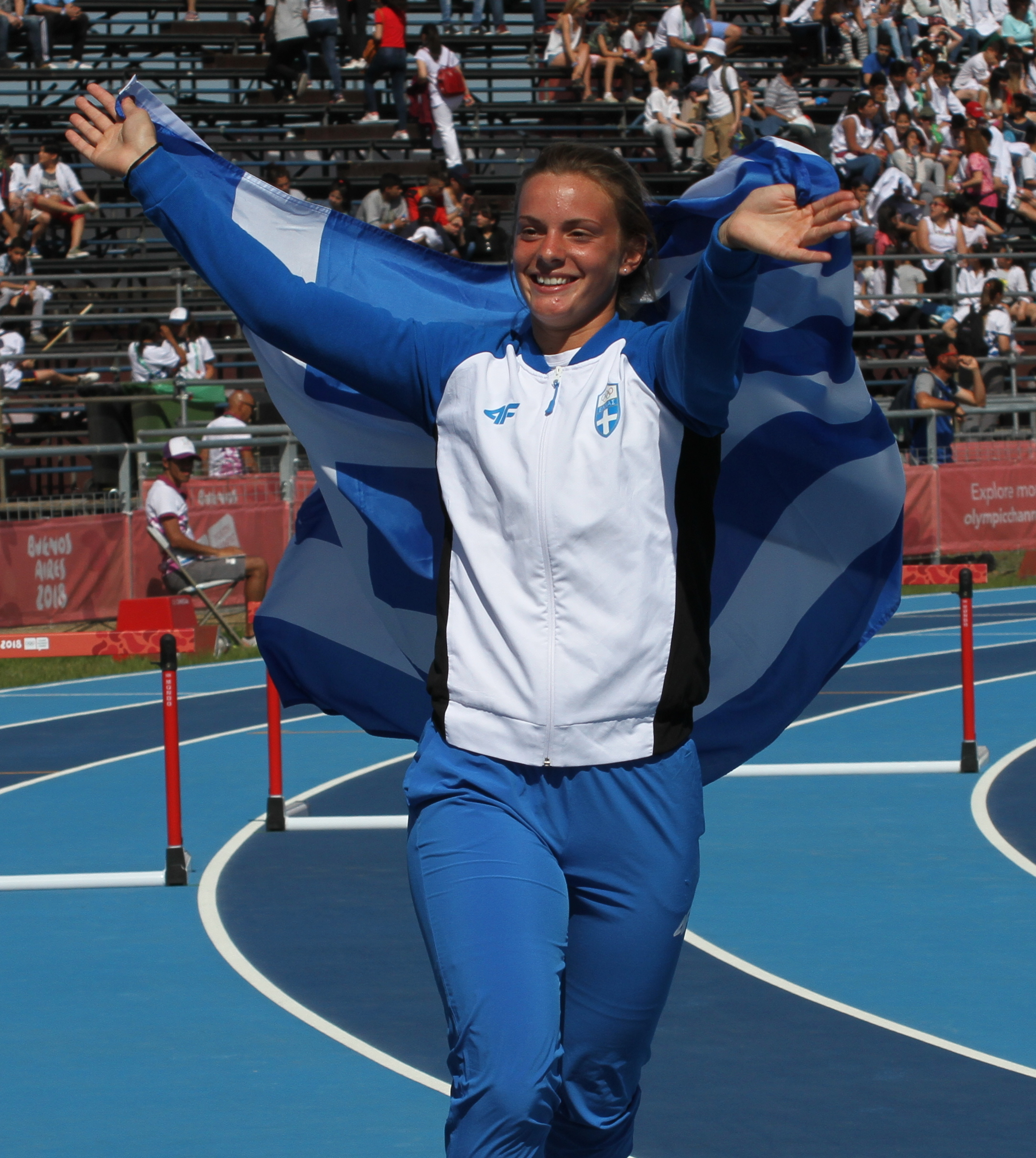
- Tzengko at the 2018 Summer Youth Olympics in Buenos Aires

Personal information
- Born: 2 September 2002 (age 24) Nea Kallikrateia, Greece
- Education: Aristotle University of Thessaloniki
- Height: 1.72 m (5 ft 8 in)

Sport
- Country: Greece
- Sport: Track and field
- Event: Javelin throw
- Club: A.S. Kentavros, Nea Kallikrateias, Chalkidiki
- Coached by: George Boskariov

Achievements and titles
- Personal bests: 65.81 m (Munich 2022); (500 g); 65.90 m NU18R (Ioannina 2019)
Medal record
Women's athletics
Representing Greece
European Championships
Gold medal – first place	2022 Munich	Javelin throw
European U23 Championships
Gold medal – first place	2023 Espoo	Javelin throw
World U20 Championships
Silver medal – second place	2021 Nairobi	Javelin throw
European U20 Championships
Gold medal – first place	2021 Tallinn	Javelin throw
Youth Olympic Games
Gold medal – first place	2018 Buenos Aires	Javelin throw

Elina Tzengko (Greek: Ελίνα Τζένγκο, Albanian: Elina Xhengo; Thessaloniki, 2 September 2002) is a Greek javelin thrower. She is a European champion and won the gold medal at the 2022 Championships, becoming the youngest ever javelin and Greek European champion. Tzengko placed first in the finals of the 2025 Diamond League and represented Greece at the 2024 Summer Olympics. She is also a European U23, European U20 and Youth Olympics gold medallist, World U20 silver medallist and seven-time Greek national champion.

== Early life ==
Elina Tzengko was born in Thessaloniki, Greece to Albanian immigrants and grew up in Nea Kallikrateia, Chalkidiki. She has two older sisters. She started athletics throwing small balls around the age of seven. When she was at primary school, she joined the sports club A.S. Kentavros Neas Kallikrateias (Αθλητικός Σύλλογος - Α.Σ. Κένταυρος Νέας Καλλικράτειας). She was big enough to handle the javelin at age 11.

Tzengko received Greek citizenship on 22 June 2018. In 2021, she started studying at School of Physical Education and Sports Science of the Aristotle University of Thessaloniki.

A key role in her career was played by her coach, George Boskariov, who discovered her talent while at A.S. Kentavros athletics club, and guided her toward the javelin throw.

== Career ==
In 2018, Tzengko competed in the European Athletics Under-18 Championships in Hungary, where she placed seventh. At the Summer Youth Olympics held in Buenos Aires, Argentina in October, she won the gold medal with throws of 63.34 m and 61.74 m, and was voted European Athletics top female athlete of the month.

The following year in May, she set the world U18 best of 65.90 m (javelin 500 g) at the Panhellenic School Championships in Ioannina.

On 1 August 2020, the 17-year-old threw world U20 record of 63.96 m at the Greek U20 Championships held also in Ioannina. However, World Athletics refused to recognize it as a record because doping control was not conducted immediately following the completion of the competition as required by anti-doping regulations.

In July 2021, she became the European U20 champion. The next month, with a throw of 59.60 m, Tzengko earned the silver medal at the World U20 Championships in Nairobi, Kenya.

On 20 August 2022, still only 19, Tzengko won the gold medal with a personal best of 65.81 metres at the European Championships held in Munich. She became the youngest athlete in her discipline – male or female – to win the title at the Europeans, the first teenager to win a European throwing title, and the youngest ever Greek European champion. In October, Tzengko also became the first Greek athlete in history to receive European Athletics Rising Star award as she was crowned 2022 Female Rising Star.

In August 2025, Elina Tzengko, in her first appearance in a Diamond League final, won the gold medal with a throw of 64.57 m.

== Achievements ==
=== International competitions ===
Representing Greece
Year	Competition	Venue	Position	Event	Result
2018	European U18 Championships	Győr, Hungary	7th	Javelin throw (500 g)	53.84 m
2018	Youth Olympic Games	Buenos Aires, Argentina	1st	Javelin throw (500 g)	63.34 + 61.74 m
2019	European U20 Championships	Borås, Sweden	4th	Javelin throw	53.99 m
2019	European Youth Summer Olympic Festival	Baku, Azerbaijan	–	Javelin throw (500 g)	DNS
2021	European Throwing Cup	Split, Croatia	7th	Javelin throw	58.72 m
2021	European Team Championships, 1st League	Cluj-Napoca, Romania	4th	Javelin throw	54.86 m
2021	Balkan Championships	Smederevo, Serbia	1st	Javelin throw	61.42 m
2021	European U20 Championships	Tallinn, Estonia	1st	Javelin throw	61.18 m
2021	World U20 Championships	Nairobi, Kenya	2nd	Javelin throw	59.60 m
2022	European Throwing Cup	Leiria, Portugal	4th	Javelin throw	54.28 m
2022	World Championships	Eugene, United States	20th (q)	Javelin throw	57.12 m
2022	European Championships	Munich, Germany	1st	Javelin throw	65.81 m PB
2023	European Throwing Cup	Leiria, Portugal	1st	Javelin throw	63.65 m EU23L
2023	European Team Championships, Division 1	Chorzów, Poland	5th	Javelin throw	59.40 m
2023	European U23 Championships	Espoo, Finland	1st	Javelin throw	60.73 m
2023	World Championships	Budapest, Hungary	30th (q)	Javelin throw	54.27 m
2024	European Championships	Rome, Italy	6th	Javelin throw	59.46 m
2024	Olympic Games	Paris, France	9th	Javelin throw	61.85 m
2025	European Team Championships 1st Division	Madrid, Spain	1st	Javelin throw	62.23 m
2025	Balkan Championships	Volos, Greece	1st	Javelin throw	62.83 m CR
2025	Diamond League	Zurich, Switzerland	1st	Javelin throw	64.90 m SB
2025	World Championships	Tokyo, Japan	5th	Javelin throw	62.72 m
2026	Balkan Championships	Volos, Greece	2nd	Javelin throw	57.88 m
2026	European Championships	Birmingham, United Kingdom	11th	Javelin throw	54.01 m

=== National titles ===
- Greek Athletics Championships: 2020, 2021, 2022

Awards and achievements
Preceded by (Netherlands) Femke Bol	Women's European Rising Star of the Year; 2022	Succeeded by Incumbent
