= 2021 Balkan Athletics Championships =

- Dates: 26–27 June
- Host city: Smederevo, Serbia
- Venue: Smederevo Fortress
- Level: Senior
- Events: 42
- Participation: 415 athletes from 16 nations

The 2021 Balkan Athletics Championships was the 74th edition of the annual track and field competition for athletes from the Balkans, organised by Balkan Athletics. It was held on 26 and 27 June at the Smederevo Fortress in Smederevo, Serbia.

Marija Vuković won the women's high jump with 1.97 metres – a Montenegro national record.

== Results ==
=== Men ===
Event	Gold		Silver		Bronze	
100 metres	Jak Ali Harvey (TUR)	10.33	Ioannis Nyfantopoulos (GRE)	10.53	Alexander Donigian (ARM)	10.56
200 metres	Serhiy Smelyk (UKR)	20.62	Jak Ali Harvey (TUR)	20.66	Gal Noam Arad (ISR)	21.12
400 metres	Luka Janežič (SLO)	46.57	Rok Ferlan (SLO)	47.16	Mihai Pîslaru (ROU)	47.27
800 metres	Žan Rudolf (SLO)	1:47.72	Mehmet Çelik (TUR)	1:47.91	Christos Kotitsas (GRE)	1:48.07 PB
1500 metres	Elzan Bibić (SRB)	3:52.23	Ramazan Barbaros (TUR)	3:52.515	Yervand Mkrtchyan (ARM)	3:52.518
3000 metres	Nicolae Soare (ROU)	8:04.23 PB	Dino Bošnjak (CRO)	8:08.68	Ömer Amaçtan (TUR)	8:09.34 PB
5000 metres	Nicolae Soare (ROU)	13:49.13 PB	Andreas Vojta (AUT)	13:57.24	Dario Ivanovski (MKD)	14:02.32 PB
3000 metres Steeplechase	Mitko Tsenov (BUL)	8:48.00	Hilal Yego (TUR)	8:52.65	Andrei Cristian Ştefana (ROU)	9:04.08
110 metres hurdles	Stanislav Stankov (BUL)	13.56	Mikdat Sevler (TUR)	13.68	Filip Jakob Demšar (SLO)	13.78
400 metres hurdles	Dmytro Romanyuk (UKR)	50.3	Denys Nechyporenko (UKR)	51.2	Adam Yakobi (ISR)	51.4
4 × 100 metres relay	Turkey; Kayhan Özer; Jak Ali Harvey; Oğuz Uyar; Ertan Özkan	39.64	Greece; Konstantinos Zikos; Theodoros Vrontinos; Panagiotis Trivyzas; Ioannis Nyfantopoulos	40.04	Israel; Omrei Sadan; Blessing Akwasi Afrifah; Aviv Koffler; Gal Noam Arad	40.12
4 × 400 metres relay	Slovenia; Jure Grkman; Jan Vukovič; Gregor Grahovac; Lovro Mesec Košir	3:07.35	Romania; David Laurentiu Gudi; Ionut Catalin Olteanu; Vlad Dulcescu; Mihai Cristia Pîslaru	3:10.19	Croatia; Zvonimir Ivašković; Karlo Videka; Jakov Vuković; Mateo Ružić	3:11.56
High jump	Dmytro Yakovenko (UKR)	2.22	Alperen Acet (TUR)	2.22	Vasilios Konstantinou (CYP)	2.19
Pole vault	Emmanouil Karalis (GRE)	5.70 CR	Ersu Şaşma (TUR)	5.50	Robert Renner (SLO)	5.40
Long jump	Gabriel Bitan (ROU)	8.11	Serhiy Nykyforov (UKR)	8.09	Lazar Anić (SRB)	7.91
Triple jump	Nikolaos Andrikopoulos (GRE)	16.73	Georgi Tsonov (BUL)	16.12	Alexandru Gheorghe Tache (ROU)	16.04
Shot put	Armin Sinančević (SRB)	21.50	Asmir Kolašinac (SRB)	20.54	Marius Constantin Musteate (ROU)	19.98
Discus Throw	Furtula Danijel (MNE)	62.96	Martin Marković (CRO)	60.84	Rafael Antoniou (CYP)	59.09
Hammer Throw	Eşref Apak (TUR)	73.60	Christos Frantzeskakis (GRE)	72.74	Michail Anastasakis (GRE)	72.02
Javelin Throw	Mark Slavov (BUL)	79.50	Alexandru Novac (ROU)	77.80	Dejan Mileusnić (BIH)	76.59
Decathlon	Vadym Adamchuk (UKR)	7301	Jan Mitsche (AUT)	7115	Dragan Pešić (MNE)	6710
WR world record | AR area record | CR championship record | GR games record | NR national record | OR Olympic record | PB personal best | SB season best | WL world leading (in a given season)

=== Women ===
Event	Gold		Silver		Bronze	
100 metres	Diana Vaisman (ISR)	11.32	Inna Eftimova (BUL)	11.34	Ramona Papaioannou (CYP)	11.47
200 metres	Rafailia Spanoudaki-Chatziriga (GRE)	23.16	Inna Eftimova (BUL)	23.41	Olivia Fotopoulou (CYP)	23.50
400 metres	Susanne Walli (AUT)	52.41	Anita Horvat (SLO)	52.75	Eirini Vasileiou (GRE)	53.32
800 metres	Maja Pačarić (CRO)	2:04.26 PB	Svitlana Zhulzhyk (UKR)	2:04.75	Anastasiia Ryemyen (UKR)	2:04.78
1500 metres	Orysia Demianiuk (UKR)	4:19.77	Maja Pačarić (CRO)	4:20.74 PB	Maria Claudia Florea (ROU)	4:21.01
3000 metres	Adela Paulina Baltoi (ROU)	9:57.30	Burcu Subatan (TUR)	10:00.59	Alma Hrnjić (BIH)	10:27.34
5000 metres	Klara Lukan (SLO)	15:37.11	Anastasia Marinakou (GRE)	16:09.05 PB	Elif Dağdelen (TUR)	16:09.10
3000 metres Steeplechase	Adelina Elena Panaet (ROU)	9:44.27	Nataliia Strebkova (UKR)	9:45.56	Claudia Prisecaru (ROU)	9:46.66 PB
100 metres hurdles	Elisavet Pesiridou (GRE)	13.06	Beate Schrott (AUT)	13.07	Anamaria Nesteriuc (ROU)	13.17
400 metres hurdles	Dimitra Gnafaki (GRE)	57.00 PB	Agata Zupin (SLO)	57.22	Mariya Mykolenko (UKR)	57.52
4 × 100 metres relay	Greece; Katerina Dalaka; Andrianna Ferra; Maria Gatou; Korina Politi	45.24	Serbia; Anja Lukić; Ivana Ilić; Tamara Milutinović; Milana Tirnanić	45.58	Romania; Ana Maria Roşianu; Roxana Maria Ene; Anamaria Nesteriuc; Marina Andreea Baboi	45.82
4 × 400 metres relay	Slovenia; Agata Zupin; Gala Trajkovič; Maja Pogorevc; Anita Horvat	3:33.99	Greece; Elpida-Ioanna Karkalatou; Korina Politi; Andrianna Ferra; Eirini Vasileiou	3:34.87	Ukraine; Tetiana Bezshyiko; Anastasiia Ryemyen; Svitlana Zhulzhyk; Mariia Mykolenko	3:39.53
High jump	Marija Vuković (MNE)	1.97 PB	Daniela Stanciu (ROU)	1.92	Lia Apostolovski (SLO)	1.89
Pole vault	Nikoleta Kyriakopoulou (GRE)	4.60	Iana Gladiichuk (UKR)	4.50	Buse Arikazan (TUR)	4.40
Long jump	Florentina Costina Iusco (ROU)	6.65	Milica Gardašević (SRB)	6.61	Filippa Fotopoulou (CYP)	6.38
Triple jump	Neja Filipič (SLO)	14.25	Spyridoula Karydi (GRE)	14.12	Tuğba Danışmaz (TUR)	14.07
Shot put	Emel Dereli (TUR)	18.51	Pınar Akyol (TUR)	17.02	Maria Magkoulia (GRE)	14.40
Discus Throw	Chrysoula Anagnostopoulou (GRE)	59.87	Dragana Tomašević (SRB)	56.62	Özlem Becerek (TUR)	54.54
Hammer Throw	Hanna Skydan (AZE)	71.18	Bianca Florentina Ghelber (ROU)	70.00	Anamari Kožul (CRO)	67.38
Javelin Throw	Elina Tzengko (GRE)	61.42	Adriana Vilagoš (SRB)	60.94	Marija Vučenović (SRB)	56.55
Heptathlon	Stylani Tzikanoula (GRE)	5183	Marina Živković (SRB)	5036	Emine Selda Kirdemir (TUR)	4733
WR world record | AR area record | CR championship record | GR games record | NR national record | OR Olympic record | PB personal best | SB season best | WL world leading (in a given season)

== Medal table ==
The host country is highlighted in lavender blue

Rank	Nation	Gold	Silver	Bronze	Total
1	Greece	10	6	4	20
2	Romania	6	4	8	18
3	Slovenia	6	3	3	12
4	Ukraine	5	5	3	13
5	Turkey	4	9	6	19
6	Bulgaria	3	3	0	6
7	Serbia*	2	6	2	10
8	Montenegro	2	0	1	3
9	Croatia	1	3	2	6
10	Austria	1	3	0	4
11	Israel	1	0	3	4
12	Azerbaijan	1	0	0	1
13	Cyprus	0	0	5	5
14	Armenia	0	0	2	2
14	Bosnia and Herzegovina	0	0	2	2
16	North Macedonia	0	0	1	1
Totals (16 entries)		42	42	42	126
