= 2023 European Throwing Cup =

- Location: Leiria, Portugal
- Dates: 11–12 March

The 2023 European Throwing Cup was held from 11 to 12 March 2023 in Leiria, Portugal.

== Results ==
WL - the best result on the world lists in 2022	EL - the best result on European lists in 2022	CR - European Cup record
NR - national record	PB - personal record	SB - the best result of the season

=== Men ===
==== Seniors ====
Event	Gold		Silver		Bronze	
Shot put	Roman Kokoško; Ukraine	21.52 EL	Bob Bertemes; Luxembourg	21.21	Zane Weir; Italy	20.98
Discus throw	Kristjan Čeh; Slovenia	68.30 WL	Alin Firfirică; Romania	63.78 SB	Martin Marković; Croatia	62.20 SB
Hammer throw	Bence Halász; Hungary	74.65 SB	Thomas Mardal; Norway	73.94 SB	Yann Chaussinand; France	73.25
Javelin throw	Leandro Ramos; Portugal	78.57 SB	Dagbjartur Daði Jónsson; Iceland	78.56 SB	Manu Quijera; Spain	78.42 SB

==== U23 ====
Event	Gold		Silver		Bronze	
Shot put	Muhamet Ramadani; Kosovo	19.28 EL	Eric Maihöfer; Germany	19.13	Riccardo Ferrara; Italy	19.00
Discus throw	Steven Richter; Germany	64.23 PB	Mykhaylo Brudin; Ukraine	58.60 PB	Enrico Saccomano; Italy	56.27 SB
Hammer throw	Mykhaylo Kokhan; Ukraine	75.80	Dawid Piłat; Poland	72.42 SB	Halil Yılmazer; Turkey	70.45 PB
Javelin throw	Artur Felfner; Ukraine	80.09	Lenny Brisseault; France	72.55 SB	György Herczeg; Hungary	72.46

=== Women ===
==== Seniors ====
Event	Gold		Silver		Bronze	
Shot put	Jessica Inchude; Portugal	18.14 EL	Yemisi Ogunleye; Germany	18.09 SB	Sara Lennman; Sweden	17.95
Discus throw	Shanice Craft; Germany	64.88 WL	Liliana Cá; Portugal	64.32 SB	Mélina Robert-Michon; France	61.70
Hammer throw	Sara Fantini; Italy	73.26 WL	Bianca Ghelber; Romania	71.52	Katrine Koch Jacobsen; Denmark	71.08 SB
Javelin throw	Elina Tzengko; Greece	63.65	Marija Vučenović; Serbia	60.56 SB	Adriana Vilagoš; Serbia	59.83 WU20L

==== U23 ====
Event	Gold		Silver		Bronze	
Shot put	Serena Vincent; Great Britain	16.90 PB	Emilia Kangas; Finland	16.28 PB	Nina Chioma Ndubuisi; Germany	16.24
Discus throw	Lotta Flatum; Norway	56.54	Emily Conte; Italy	56.18 PB	Marie-Josée Bovele-Linaka; France	53.42
Hammer throw	Valeriya Ivanenko-Kyrylina; Ukraine	65.51	Nicola Tuthill; Ireland	64.44 NU23R	Rachele Mori; Italy	62.79
Javelin throw	Veronika Šokota; Croatia	56.82 SB	Petra Sičaková; Czech Republic	55.23 SB	Esra Türkmen; Turkey	54.69 SB

== Medal table ==
* Host nation (Portugal)

Rank	Nation	Gold	Silver	Bronze	Total
1	Ukraine	4	1	0	5
2	Germany	2	2	1	5
3	Portugal*	2	1	0	3
4	Italy	1	1	4	6
5	Norway	1	1	0	2
6	Croatia	1	0	1	2
6	Hungary	1	0	1	2
8	Great Britain	1	0	0	1
8	Greece	1	0	0	1
8	Kosovo	1	0	0	1
8	Slovenia	1	0	0	1
12	Romania	0	2	0	2
13	France	0	1	3	4
14	Serbia	0	1	1	2
15	Czech Republic	0	1	0	1
15	Finland	0	1	0	1
15	Iceland	0	1	0	1
15	Ireland	0	1	0	1
15	Luxembourg	0	1	0	1
15	Poland	0	1	0	1
21	Turkey	0	0	2	2
22	Denmark	0	0	1	1
22	Spain	0	0	1	1
22	Sweden	0	0	1	1
Totals (24 entries)		16	16	16	48

== Participating Issue ==
Because of Russian invasion of Ukraine, Russia and Belarus were banned.
