= Serbia at the 2010 European Athletics Championships =

- WA code: SRB

in Barcelona
- Competitors: 12
- Medals: Gold 0 Silver 0 Bronze 0 Total 0

European Athletics Championships appearances (overview)
- 2006; 2010; 2012; 2014; 2016; 2018; 2022; 2024; 2026

Serbia was represented by 12 athletes (6 men and 6 women) at the 2010 European Athletics Championships held in Barcelona, Spain, from 27 July to 1 August 2010.

== Participants ==
Event	Men	Women
800 m	Goran Nava	
1500 m	Goran Nava	Marina Munćan
100 hurdles		Jelena Jotanović
50 km walk	Predrag Filipović	
Marathon		Olivera Jevtić
Long Jump		Ivana Španović
Shot Put	Asmir Kolašinac; Milan Jotanović	
Discus Throw		Dragana Tomašević
Javelin Throw		Tatjana Jelača
Decathlon	Mihail Dudaš; Igor Šarčević	

== Results ==
2010 Barcelona	Gold	Silver	Bronze	Total
Serbia (SRB)	0	0	0	0
