= Paola Padovan =

Italian javelin thrower (born 1995)

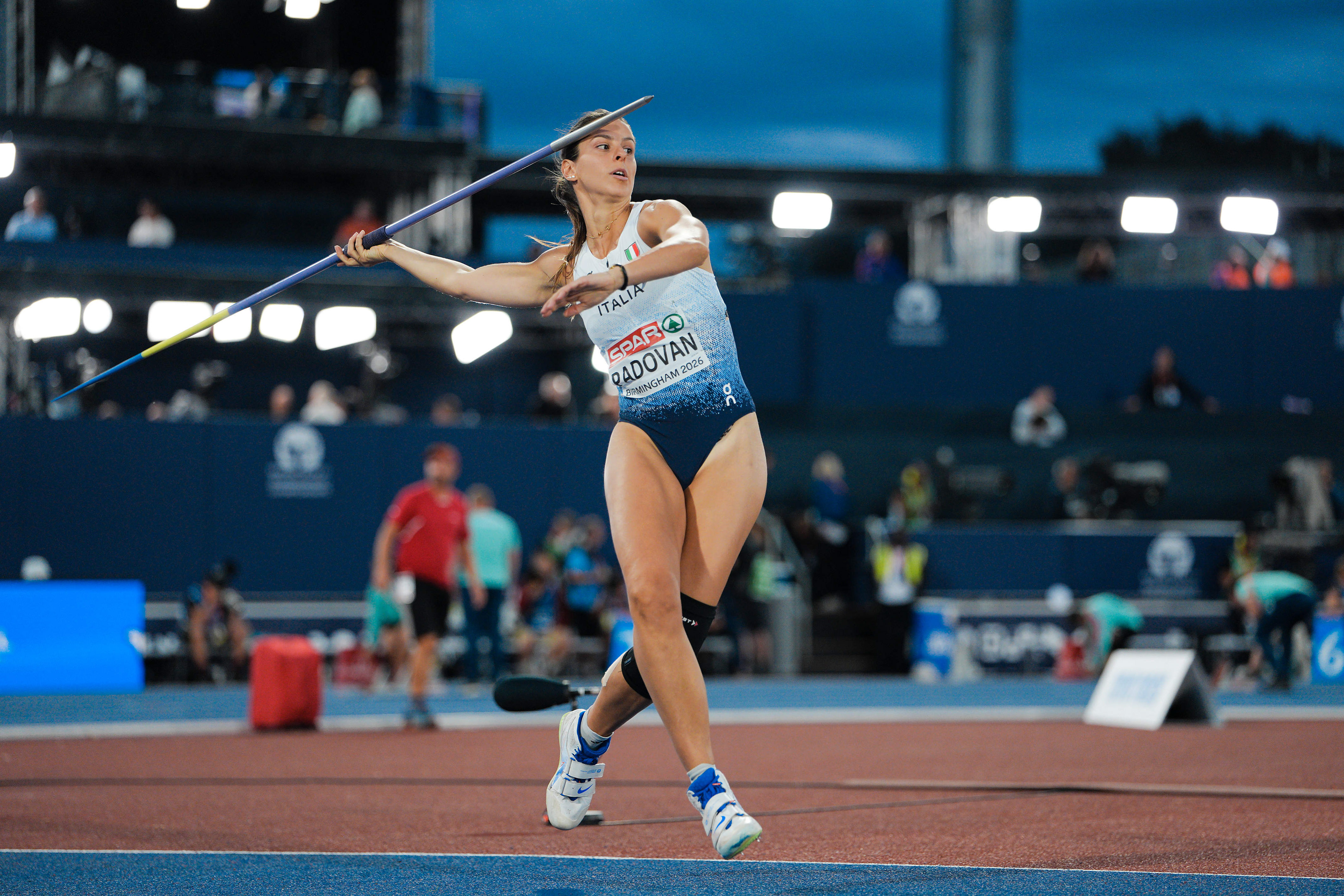
- Padovan here competing in the final of the European Championships in Birmingham 2026 when she finished 7th and also set her new PB.

Personal information
- National team: Italy (caps 6)
- Born: 4 December 1995 (age 30) Feltre, Italy
- Height: 1.81 m (5 ft 11 in)
- Weight: 68 kg (150 lb)

Sport
- Sport: Athletics
- Event: Pole Vault
- Club: Carabinieri Bologna
- Coached by: Kari Ihalainen

Achievements and titles
- Personal best: Javelin throw: 58.91 m (2026)
Medal record
Women's athletics
Representing Italy
European Throwing Cup
Bronze medal – third place	2026 Nicosia	Javelin throw
Mediterranean Athletics U23 Championships
Bronze medal – third place	2016 Tunis	Javelin throw

Paola Padovan (born 4 December 1995) is an Italian javelin thrower who won five national titles at senior level.

== Biography ==
She graduated in architecture, an academic title obtained from the Iuav University of Venice.

== Career ==
On 13 April 2025, after almost seven years, Padovan improved her previous personal best by more than two meters, with a distance of 59.25 m in a regional competition in Treviso. Because the competition was not included in the official European Athletics/World Athletics "global calendar", this performance is not recognised by World Athletics, which lists her 58.91 m for seventh in the 2026 European Athletics Championships as her best. Her 59.25 m throw ranks her fourth-best Italian all-time in the javelin throw, which would also be the case for her 58.91 m.

== Achievements ==
Year	Competition	Venue	Rank	Event	Measure	Notes
2017	European Team Championships	(France) Lille	7th	Javelin throw	55.45 m	
2026	European Throwing Cup	(Cyprus) Nicosia	3rd	Javelin throw	58.69 m	PB
2026	European Championships	(United Kingdom) Birmingham	7th	Javelin throw	58.91 m	PB

== National titles ==
She won five national championships at senior level.

- Italian Athletics Championships
  - Javelin throw: 2022, 2026 (2)
- Italian Winter Throwing Championships
  - Javelin throw: 2024, 2025, 2026 (3)

== See also ==
- Italian all-time lists - Javelin throw
