= Serena Vincent =

British athlete (born 2001)

Personal information
- Nationality: British (English)
- Born: 5 December 2002 (age 23) Bursledon, England

Sport
- Sport: Athletics
- Event: Shot put
- Club: City of Portsmouth

Achievements and titles
- Personal bests: Shot put: 17.78m (Loughborough, 2024)
Medal record
Women's athletics
Representing Great Britain
European U23 Championships
Silver medal – second place	2023 Espoo	Shot put

Serena Vincent (date 5 December 2001) is a British shot putter. She won the 2026 UK Athletics Championships and the 2025 and 2026 UK Indoor Championships.

== Early life and education ==
From Bursledon, she attended The Gregg School in Southampton. At the age of fifteen years-old, she was selected to represent England at the Commonwealth Youth Games. The youngest competitor in the field, she placed ninth overall in the shot put final. She studied at Portsmouth University.

== Career ==
A member of City of Portsmouth AC, Vincent set British shot put records at U17 and U18 level. She won the World Schools Cup in Croatia in 2019.

In September 2020, she became the number one ranked U20 shot putter in the world. That month, she won her first medal at the senior 2020 British Athletics Championships, throwing 15.60m to secure third place.

In July 2021, she won the senior England Athletics Championship shot put title. In 2022, she placed fifth at the 2022 British Athletics Championships.

She managed 16.15m to finish second in the women’s shot put behind world champion Chase Ealey at the Reykjavik International Games in February 2023. In March 2023, she won the U23 women’s shot put at the 2023 European Throwing Cup with a personal best of 16.90 metres. She was a silver medalist in the shot put at the 2023 European Athletics U23 Championships in Espoo in July 2023, improving her personal best to 16.93 metres.

In February 2024, she was runner-up at the 2024 British Indoor Athletics Championships in Birmingham with a distance of 16.69 metres. She set a new personal best at the Loughborough International of 17.78 metres in May 2024. She was a silver medalist at the 2024 British Athletics Championships in the shot put, with 17.32 metres.

She won the shot put at the 2025 British Indoor Athletics Championships. She was selected for the British team for the 2025 European Athletics Indoor Championships in Apeldoorn.

She was selected for the 2025 European Athletics Team Championships in Madrid in June 2025, placing seventh overall. She was runner-up to Adele Nicoll at the 2025 UK Athletics Championships on 3 August 2025 in Birmingham with a throw of 16.77 metres.

On 15 February 2026, Vincent won the 2026 British Indoor Athletics Championships in Birmingham, with a best mark of 17.33 metres. On 20 June, she won the shot put title at the 2026 UK Championships with a best effort of 17.02 metres. Having been controversially not selected for the England team for the 2026 Commonwealth Games in Glasgow, she competed for Great Britain at the 2026 European Championships in Birmingham without advancing to the final on 10 August.
