= Özlem Becerek =

Turkish discus thrower

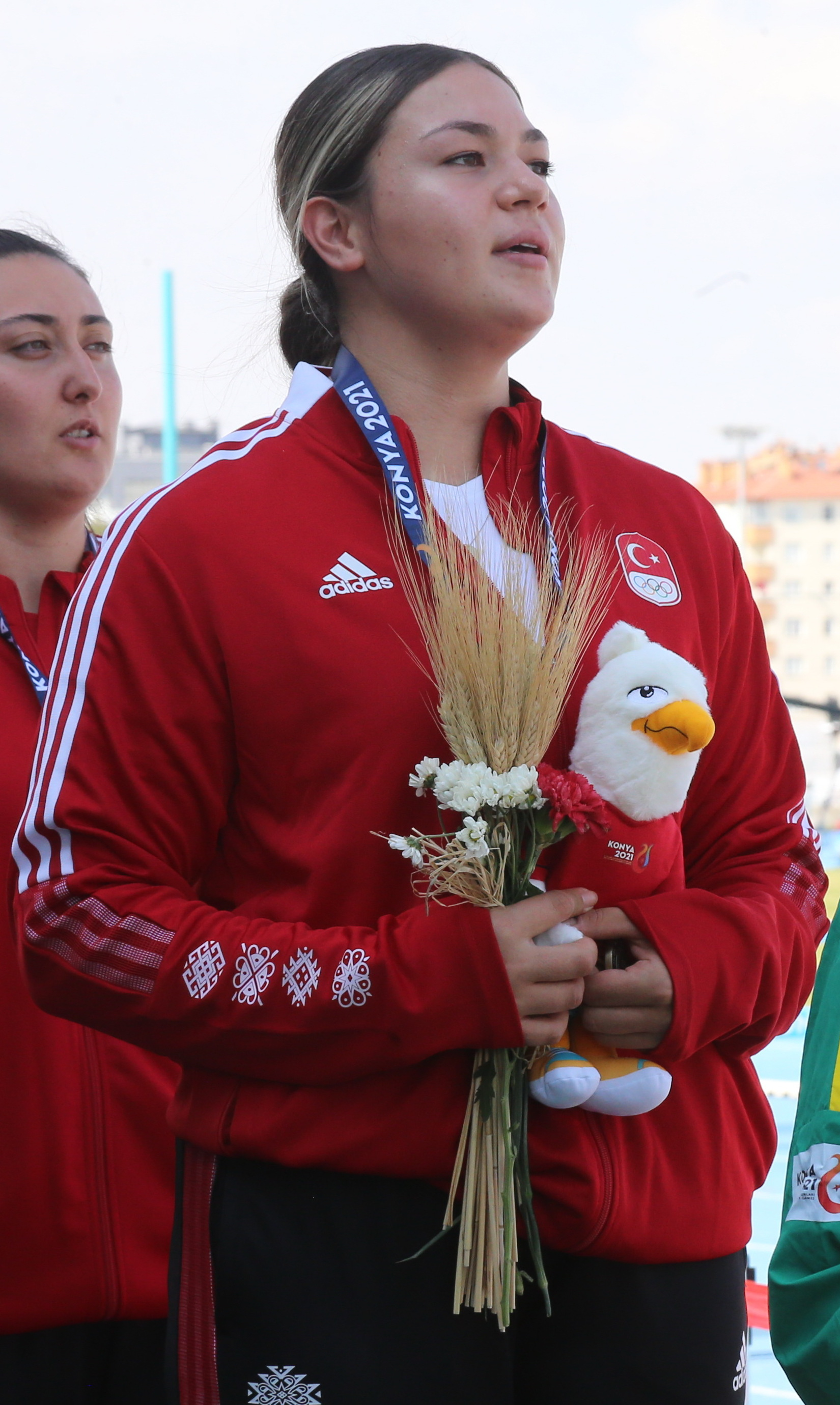
- Özlem Becerek at the medal ceremony of the 2021 Islamic Solidarity Games (2022)

Personal information
- Nationality: Turkish
- Born: 22 April 2002 (age 24) Uşak, Turkey
- Education: Aydın Adnan Menderes University

Sport
- Sport: Discus throw
- Club: Fenerbahçe Athletics
Medal record
Women's Discus throw
Representing Turkey
Summer World University Games
Gold medal – first place	2025 Chengdu	Discus throw
Islamic Solidarity Games
Gold medal – first place	2021 Konya	Discus throw
Bronze medal – third place	2025 Riyadh	Discus throw
Mediterranean Games
Bronze medal – third place	2022 Oran	Discus throw
Bronze medal – third place	2026 Taranto	Discus throw
European Team Championships
Bronze medal – third place	2025 Maribor	Discus throw
Gold medal – first place	2021 Cluj-Napoca	Discus throw
European Throwing Cup
Gold medal – first place	2024 Leiria	Discus throw U23
Gold medal – first place	2021 Split	Discus throw U23
Balkan Athletics Championships
Gold medal – first place	2023 Kraljevo	Discus throw
Bronze medal – third place	2021 Smederevo	Discus throw
Gold medal – first place	2020 Cluj-Napoca	Discus throw
Gold medal – first place	2019 Pravets	Discus throw
European Athletics U23 Championships
Silver medal – second place	2023 Espoo	Discus throw
European Athletics U20 Championships
Silver medal – second place	2019 Borås	Discus throw
Youth Olympic Games
Bronze medal – third place	2018 Buenos Aires	Discus throw
European Youth Olympic Festival
Bronze medal – third place	2019 Baku	Discus throw
European Athletics U18 Championships
Bronze medal – third place	2018 Győr	Discus throw

Özlem Becerek (born 22 April 2002) is a Turkish discus thrower.

== Personal life ==
Özlem Bececerek was born in Uşak, Turkey on 22 April 2002. After completing her secondary education at the Fatih Middle School, and then at the 50th Anniversary Multi-Program High School in her hometown, she attended Aydın Adnan Menderes University to study Coaching.

== Sports career ==
Already at her age of 14, Becerek became Turkish youth champion. She is a member of Fenerbahçe Athletics.

In 2018, she took one bronze medal at the European Athletics U18 Championships held in Győr, Hungary, and another bronze mwsal at the Summer Youth Olympics in Buenos Aires, Argentina.

She received the bronze medal at the 2019 European Youth Summer Olympic Festival in Baku, Azerbaijan. At the 2019 European Athletics U20 Championships in Borås, Sweden, she won the silver medal. The same year, she won the gold medal at the 2019 Balkan Athletics Championships in Pravets, Bulgaria.

In 2020, she took the gold medal at the 2020 Balkan Athletics Championships in Cluj-Napoca, Romania.

At the 2021 European Throwing Cup in Split, Croatia, Becerek won the gold medal in the U23 category, and improved her own national U20 record from 58.09 m set in 2020 to 58.80 m. the 2021 European Athletics Team Championships in Cluj-Napoca, Romania. She took the bronze medal at the 2021 Balkan Athletics Championships in Smederevo, Serbia.

She captured the gold medal at the 2021 Islamic Solidarity Games in Konya, Turkey, and set a new Games record with 54.91 m. She placed seventh at the 2021 Summer World University Games in Chengdu, China.

She won the bronze medal at the 2022 Mediterranean Games in Oran, Algeria, and set a new national U23 record with 61.96 m. She was unable to qualify for the finals at the 2022 European Athletics Championships in Munich, Germany.

In 2023, she became gold medalist at the Balkan Athletics Championships in Kraljevo, Serbia. At the 2023 European Athletics U23 Championships in Espoo, Finland, she received the silver medal.

Becerek became champion in the U23 category of the 2024 European Throwing Cup in Leiria, Portugal.

She won the bronze medal in the discus throw event with 56.59 m at the 2025 European Athletics Team Championships Second Division in Maribor, Slovenia, and contributed to her team's record with 14 points.

Özlem Becerek won the gold medal in the women's discus throw at the FISU 2025 Summer World University Games, held in the Rhine-Ruhr region of Germany. Becerek secured first place with a throw of 61.15 metres, bringing pride to Turkey with her performance.
