= Małgorzata Maślak-Glugla =

Polish javelin throwerer

Personal information
- Born: 24 January 2001 (age 25) Kołobrzeg

Sport
- Sport: Athletics
- Event: Javelin throw
- Club: ULKS Tychowo

Achievements and titles
- Personal bests: Javelin: 61.79 (Tokyo, 2025)

Małgorzata Maślak-Glugla (born 24 January 2001) is a Polish javelin thrower. She won the Polish Athletics Championships in 2025.

== Biography ==
From Tychowo, she has been coached by Józef Grabarczyk since being a junior athlete. She gave up the javelin throw when she left home to go to university, before returning to it during the COVID-19 pandemic. She placed fourth in the final of the 2023 European Athletics U23 Championships in Espoo, Finland.

In 2025, she broke her personal best a number of times, including over 60 metres for the first time. She won the Polish Athletics Championships in Bydgoszcz in August 2025 with a final round throw of 61.42 metres, finishing ahead of Gabriela Andrukonis, with Maria Andrejczyk in third.

She competed at the 2025 World Athletics Championships in Tokyo, Japan, throwing personal best 61.79 metres to advance to the final, before placing twelfth overall.

In August 2026, she competed at the 2026 European Athletics Championships in Birmingham, England, placing eighth overall in the javelin throw.

== Personal life ==
She studies pedagogy at the Faculty of Humanities of the Koszalin University of Technology.
