= 2023 European Athletics U23 Championships – Women's discus throw =

Women's discus throw at the 2023 European Athletics U23 Championships
- Venue: Leppävaara Stadium
- Location: Espoo, Finland
- Dates: 14 July (qualification); 16 July (final)
- Competitors: 25 from 15 nations
- Winning distance: 56.77 m

Medalists
gold medal	Alida van Daalen	Netherlands
silver medal	Özlem Becerek	Great Britain
bronze medal	Lotta Flatum	Finland

The women's discus throw event at the 2023 European Athletics U23 Championships was held in Espoo, Finland, at Leppävaara Stadium on 14 and 16 July.

== Records ==
Prior to the competition, the records were as follows:

European U23 record	Irina Meszynski (GDR)	73.36 m	Prague, Czechoslovakia	17 August 1984
Championship U23 record	Kateryna Karsak (UKR)	64.40 m	Debrecen, Hungary	13 July 2007

== Results ==
=== Qualification ===
Qualification rules: All athletes over 54.50 m (Q) or at least 12 best (q) advanced to the final.

Rank	Group	Name	Nationality	#1	#2	#3	Mark	Notes
1	A	Alida van Daalen	Netherlands	48.24	58.49		58.49	Q
2	A	Emily Conte	Italy	57.11			57.11	Q, PB
3	B	Özlem Becerek	Turkey	51.44	x	56.23	56.23	Q
4	B	Lotta Flatum	Norway	55.32			55.32	Q
5	A	Jule Marie Gipmann	Germany	52.43	55.08		55.08	Q
6	A	Joyce Oguama	Germany	x	54.09	53.98	54.09	q
7	A	Weronika Muszyńska	Poland	52.56	51.24	52.57	52.57	q
8	A	Elisabeth Rosvold	Norway	51.33	50.40	51.93	51.93	q
9	A	Lucija Leko	Croatia	48.70	x	51.73	51.73	q
10	A	Molly Broback	Sweden	x	49.31	51.18	51.18	q
11	B	Diletta Fortuna	Italy	48.49	50.44	x	50.44	q
12	B	Katja Seng	Germany	50.29	x	x	50.29	q
13	A	Sanni Kuparinen	Finland	50.20	49.72	48.38	50.20	
14	B	Sofia Kessidi	Greece	x	49.30	49.81	49.81	
15	B	Milica Poznanović	Serbia	49.80	48.92	x	49.80	
16	B	Hana Urankar	Slovenia	47.45	48.31	49.53	49.53	
17	A	Despoina Areti Filippidou	Greece	44.15	47.50	49.15	49.15	
18	B	Andreea Iuliana Lungu	Romania	47.59	45.32	44.93	47.59	
19	A	Vineta Krūmiņa	Latvia	x	47.29	x	47.29	
20	B	Nneka Naomey Ezenwa	Spain	47.01	x	x	47.01	
21	A	Natalia Sainz	Spain	x	46.85	x	46.85	
22	A	Vilma Räsänen	Finland	38.78	45.31	43.68	45.31	
	B	Enni Aula	Finland	x	x	x	NM	
	B	Benedetta Benedetti	Italy	x	x	x	NM	
	B	Martyna Dobrowolska	Poland	x	x	x	NM	

=== Final ===
Rank	Name	Nationality	#1	#2	#3	#4	#5	#6	Result	Notes
1st place, gold medalist(s)	Alida van Daalen	Netherlands	55.20	56.11	56.12	55.77	56.77	x	56.77	
2nd place, silver medalist(s)	Özlem Becerek	Turkey	40.87	54.17	54.56	53.75	55.38	54.09	55.38	
3rd place, bronze medalist(s)	Lotta Flatum	Norway	50.07	x	51.60	51.81	53.32	54.45	54.45	
4	Emily Conte	Italy	53.75	53.41	x	50.19	50.38	53.99	53.99	
5	Joyce Oguama	Germany	48.40	52.18	53.71	x	50.16	53.24	53.71	
6	Lucija Leko	Croatia	50.94	47.78	x	52.95	x	51.69	52.95	
7	Weronika Muszyńska	Poland	50.89	51.68	51.62	52.76	48.90	52.02	52.76	
8	Jule Marie Gipmann	Germany	51.80	x	52.45	x	51.86	50.06	52.45	
9	Elisabeth Rosvold	Norway	49.74	x	x				49.74	
10	Katja Seng	Germany	49.37	47.02	x				49.37	
11	Diletta Fortuna	Italy	49.12	x	x				49.12	
12	Molly Broback	Sweden	47.31	x	48.13				48.13	
