= 2023 European Athletics U23 Championships – Women's shot put =

Women's shot put at the 2023 European Athletics U23 Championships
- Venue: Leppävaara Stadium
- Location: Espoo, Finland
- Dates: 13 July
- Competitors: 20 from 16 nations
- Winning distance: 18.32 m

Medalists
gold medal	Alida van Daalen	Netherlands
silver medal	Serena Vincent	Great Britain
bronze medal	Emilia Kangas	Finland

The women's shot put event at the 2023 European Athletics U23 Championships was held in Espoo, Finland, at Leppävaara Stadium on 13 July.

== Records ==
Prior to the competition, the records were as follows:

European U23 record	Natalya Lisovskaya (URS)	22.53 m	Sochi, Soviet Union	27 May 1984
Championship U23 record	Nadezhda Ostapchuk (BLR)	19.73 m	Amsterdam, Netherlands	12 July 2001

== Results ==
=== Qualification ===
Qualification rules: All athletes over 15.50 m (Q) or at least 12 best (q) will advance to the final

Rank	Group	Name	Nationality	#1	#2	#3	Mark	Notes
1	B	Serena Vincent	Great Britain	16.35			16.35	Q
2	A	Milaine Ammon	Germany	15.01	16.14		16.14	Q
3	B	Sina Prüfer	Germany	12.58	13.75	16.13	16.13	Q, SB
4	B	Emilia Kangas	Finland	16.13			16.13	Q
5	A	Alida van Daalen	Netherlands	15.99			15.99	Q
6	A	Katrin Brzyszkowská	Czech Republic	15.69			15.69	Q
7	A	Emilia Malmehed	Sweden	13.14	15.18	15.34	15.34	q, PB
8	B	Pinar Akyol	Turkey	x	15.33	x	15.33	q
9	A	Sara Verteramo	Italy	14.05	14.68	14.77	14.77	q
10	B	Renáta Beregszászi	Hungary	14.44	14.21	13.81	14.44	q
11	A	Natália Váleková	Slovakia	13.51	14.36	14.28	14.36	q
12	A	Julia Hammesfahr	Switzerland	13.56	14.14	14.36	14.36	q
13	B	Linn Gabrielli Gustafsson	Sweden	14.33	14.21	13.95	14.33	
14	B	Sofiya Romasyuk	Ukraine	14.33	13.66	x	14.33	
15	A	Elena Defrère	Belgium	13.95	14.31	13.93	14.31	
16	A	Réka Kling	Hungary	14.22	13.45	x	14.22	
17	B	Maria Andreadi	Greece	13.57	14.15	13.67	14.15	
18	B	Victoria Wickman	Sweden	13.87	13.46	14.03	14.03	
19	B	Mirjana Dasović	Serbia	13.36	13.83	13.71	13.83	
20	A	Lucija Leko	Croatia	x	13.19	x	13.19	

=== Final ===
Rank	Name	Nationality	#1	#2	#3	#4	#5	#6	Mark	Notes
1st place, gold medalist(s)	Alida van Daalen	Netherlands	16.73	17.49	18.10	16.79	18.10	18.32	18.32	EU23L
2nd place, silver medalist(s)	Serena Vincent	Great Britain	x	16.92	13.66	16.93	16.36	16.54	16.93	PB
3rd place, bronze medalist(s)	Emilia Kangas	Finland	16.26	x	x	16.75	x	x	16.75	
4	Milaine Ammon	Germany	15.63	x	x	14.98	16.11	x	16.11	
5	Katrin Brzyszkowská	Czech Republic	15.94	16.03	x	x	x	x	16.03	
6	Emilia Malmehed	Sweden	x	14.41	x	15.17	14.45	14.79	15.17	
7	Sina Prüfer	Germany	14.39	14.80	12.97	14.98	x	x	14.98	
8	Renáta Beregszászi	Hungary	14.41	14.25	14.84	14.91	x	x	14.91	
9	Sara Verteramo	Italy	13.92	14.15	14.31				14.31	
10	Linn Gabrielli Gustafsson	Sweden	14.17	x	14.07				14.07	
11	Julia Hammesfahr	Switzerland	13.36	x	13.59				13.59	
12	Nátalia Váleková	Slovakia	x	13.42	13.51				13.51	
	Pinar Akyol	Turkey	x	x	x				NM	
