= Serbia at the 2016 European Athletics Championships =

- WA code: SRB

in Amsterdam
- Competitors: 11
- Medals: Gold 1 Silver 0 Bronze 1 Total 2

European Athletics Championships appearances (overview)
- 2006; 2010; 2012; 2014; 2016; 2018; 2022; 2024; 2026

Serbia competed at the 2016 European Athletics Championships, which were held in Amsterdam, Netherlands from 6-10 July 2016.

== Results ==
Key

- Note – Ranks given for track events are within the athlete's heat only
- Q = Qualified for the next round
- q = Qualified for the next round as a fastest loser or, in field events, by position without achieving the qualifying target
- NR = National record
- N/A = Round not applicable for the event
- Bye = Athlete not required to compete in round

Men
Track & road events

Athlete	Event	Heat		Semifinal		Final	
Athlete	Event	Result	Rank	Result	Rank	Result	Rank
Milan Ristić	110 m hurdles	BYE		13:45	8*	DNA	

Field Events

Athlete	Event	Qualification		Final	
Athlete	Event	Distance	Rank	Distance	Rank
Lazar Anić	Long jump	7.93	7 q	7.63	10
Asmir Kolašinac	Shot put	20.14	8 q	20.43	5
Vedran Samac	Javelin throw	DNS		DNA	

Combined events – Decathlon

Athlete	Event	100 m	LJ	SP	HJ	400 m	110H	DT	PV	JT	1500 m	Final	Rank
Mihail Dudaš	Result	10.90	7.44	14.24	2.01	49.45	14.55	45.65	4.70	58.19	4:30:90	8153	3rd place, bronze medalist(s)
Mihail Dudaš	Points	883	920	743	813	840	905	780	819	711	739	8153	3rd place, bronze medalist(s)

Women

Track & road events

Athlete	Event	Heat		Semifinal		Final	
Athlete	Event	Result	Rank	Result	Rank	Result	Rank
Tamara Salaški	400 m	BYE		52.27	7 Q	52.23	7
Amela Terzić	800 m	DNS		DNA			
Amela Terzić	1500 m	4:09:71	1 Q	—N/a		4:37:70	12
Olivera Jevtić	Half marathon	—N/a				1:13:39	28

Field Events

Athlete	Event	Qualification		Final	
Athlete	Event	Distance	Rank	Distance	Rank
Ivana Španović	Long jump	6.90	1 Q	6.94	1st place, gold medalist(s)
Dragana Tomašević	Discus throw	60.51	6 Q	56.83	11
Marija Vučenović	Javelin throw	49.18	31	DNA	
