= Serbia at the 2006 European Athletics Championships =

- WA code: SRB

in Gothenburg
- Competitors: 9
- Medals: Gold 0 Silver 1 Bronze 0 Total 1

European Athletics Championships appearances (overview)
- 2006; 2010; 2012; 2014; 2016; 2018; 2022; 2024

Serbia competed at the 2006 European Athletics Championships held in Gothenburg, Sweden, between 7 August and 13 August 2006. 9 athletes represented Serbia, 5 men and 4 women.

== Medals ==
Medal	Name	Event	Date
Silver	Olivera Jevtić	Women's Marathon	August 12

== Participants ==
Event	Men	Women
110 m Hurdles	Miroslav Novaković	
1500 m		Sonja Stolić
20 km walk	Predrag Filipović	
50 km walk	Aleksandar Raković	
Marathon		Olivera Jevtić
Shot Put	Milan Jotanović; Luka Rujević	
Discus Throw		Dragana Tomašević
Pole vault		Slavica Semenjuk
