= Serbia at the 2014 European Athletics Championships =

- WA code: SRB
- National federation: Atletski savez Srbije
- Website: www.atletskisavez.rs

in Zürich
- Competitors: 11 in 11 events
- Medals: Gold 0 Silver 2 Bronze 0 Total 2

European Athletics Championships appearances (overview)
- 2006; 2010; 2012; 2014; 2016; 2018; 2022; 2024

Serbia competed at the 2014 European Athletics Championships in Zürich, Switzerland, from 12–17 August 2014. The following athletes were selected to compete by the Serbian Athletics Federation.[1]

== Medals ==
Medal	Name	Event	Date
Silver	Ivana Španović	Women's long jump	13 August
Silver	Tatjana Jelača	Women's javelin throw	14 August

== Men's events ==
=== Track ===
Event	Athletes	Heats		Semifinal		Final	
Event	Athletes	Result	Rank	Result	Rank	Result	Rank
400 m hurdles	Emir Bekrić	49:82	9 Q	49:21	8 Q	49:90	6
1500 m	Goran Nava	3:41:43	18	—		Did not advance	
400 m	Miloš Raović	46:12	18 q	46:09	14	Did not advance	
110 m hurdles	Mian Ristić	DNS		Did not advance			

=== Field ===
Event	Athletes	Qualification		Final	
Event	Athletes	Result	Rank	Result	Rank
shot put	Asmir Kolašinac	20.15	6 Q	20.55	5
javelin throw	Vedran Samac	69.39	29	Did not advance	

== Women's events ==
=== Track ===
Event	Athletes	Heats		Semifinal		Final	
Event	Athletes	Result	Rank	Result	Rank	Result	Rank
400 m	Tamara Marković	53:41	=22	did not advance			
1500 m	Amela Terzić	4:11:75	10 Q	—		4:19:11	12

=== Field ===
Event	Athletes	Qualification		Final	
Event	Athletes	Result	Rank	Result	Rank
javelin throw	Tatjana Jelača	60.26	3 Q	64.21 NR	2nd place, silver medalist(s)
long jump	Ivana Španović	6.66	=3 Q	6.81	2nd place, silver medalist(s)
discus throw	Dragana Tomašević	52.21	16	did not advance	
