= Serbia at the 2012 European Athletics Championships =

- WA code: SRB
- National federation: Serbia
- Website: www.serbia-athletics.org.rs

in Helsinki
- Competitors: 11
- Medals Ranked 20th: Gold 0 Silver 1 Bronze 1 Total 2

European Athletics Championships appearances (overview)
- 2006; 2010; 2012; 2014; 2016; 2018; 2022; 2024

Serbia competed at the 2012 European Athletics Championships held in Helsinki, Finland, between 27 June to 1 July 2012. At the championship in Helsinki, Serbia was represented by 11 athletes (7 men and 4 women) who competed in 8 disciplines.

In addition to the silver medal, Emir Bekrić set a new national record of 49.37 seconds in the semifinal for the 400m hurdles event.

Looking at the overall medal ranking, Serbia shared 20th place with Lithuania with one silver and one bronze medal.

== Medals ==
| Medal | Name | Event | Date |
|---|---|---|---|
| Silver | Emir Bekrić | Men's 400 m hurdles | 29 June |
| Bronze | Asmir Kolašinac | Shot put | 29 June |

== Results ==
=== Men ===
Track events

| Event | Athletes | Heat | | Semifinal | | Final | |
| Event | Athletes | Result | Rank | Result | Rank | Result | Rank |
|---|---|---|---|---|---|---|---|
| 1500 m | Goran Nava | 3:41.96 | 8 q | — | | 3:47.74 | 7 |
| 400 m hurdles | Emir Bekrić | 50.73 | 15 Q | 49.37 | 1 Q | 49.49 | 2nd place, silver medalist(s) |

Field events

| Event | Athletes | Qualification | | Final | |
| Event | Athletes | Result | Rank | Result | Rank |
|---|---|---|---|---|---|
| High jump | Dragutin Topić | 2.10 | 30 | did not advance | |
| Shot put | Božidar Antunović | 18.69 | 21 | did not advance | |
| Shot put | Asmir Kolašinac | 19.62 | 10 q | 20.36 | 3rd place, bronze medalist(s) |

Combined

| Decathlon | Event | Mihail Dudaš | | |
| Decathlon | Event | Results | Points | Rank |
|---|---|---|---|---|
| | 100 m | 10.81 | 903 | 3 |
| | Long jump | 7.36 | 900 | 4 |
| | Shot put | 13.64 | 706 | 15 |
| | High jump | 1.97 | 776 | 12 |
| | 400 m | 48.02 | 908 | 1 |
| | 110 m hurdles | 14.78 | 876 | 14 |
| | Discus | 43.55 | 737 | 6 |
| | Pole vault | 4.80 | 849 | 7 |
| | Javelin | 59.98 | 738 | 5 |
| | 1500 m | 4:27.54 | 761 | 4 |
| Final | | | 8154 | 4 |

| Decathlon | Event | Igor Šarčević | | |
| Decathlon | Event | Results | Points | Rank |
|---|---|---|---|---|
| | 100 m | 11.15 | 827 | 16 |
| | Long jump | 6.54 | 707 | 24 |
| | Shot put | 14.86 | 781 | 4 |
| | High jump | DNS | | |
| | 400 m | | | |
| | 110 m hurdles | | | |
| | Discus | | | |
| | Pole vault | | | |
| | Javelin | | | |
| | 1500 m | | | |
| Final | | | | DNF |

=== Women ===
Track events

| Event | Athletes | Heat | | Semifinal | | Final | |
| Event | Athletes | Result | Rank | Result | Rank | Result | Rank |
|---|---|---|---|---|---|---|---|
| 1500 m | Marina Munćan | 4:12.33 | 12 q | — | | 4:15.63 | 12 |

Field events

| Event | Athletes | Qualification | | Final | |
| Event | Athletes | Result | Rank | Result | Rank |
|---|---|---|---|---|---|
| Long jump | Ivana Španović | 6.33 | 15 | did not advance | |
| Discus throw | Dragana Tomašević | 61.65 | 4 Q | 58.34 | 9 |
| Javelin throw | Tatjana Jelača | 57.29 | 10 q | 57.58 | 7 |
