= Anni-Linnea Alanen =

Finnish athlete (born 2002)

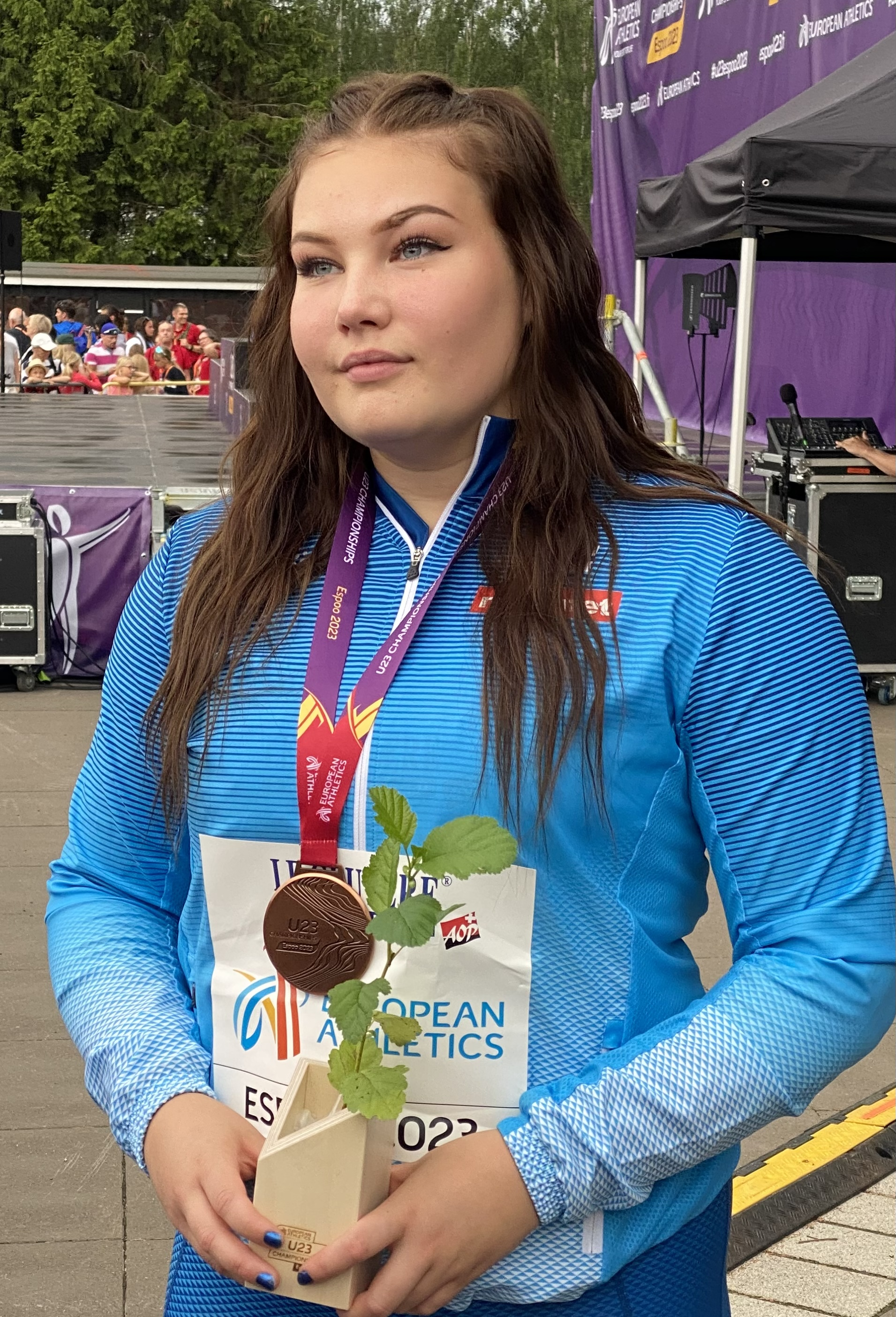

Personal information
- Nationality: Finland
- Born: 11 November 2002 (age 23)

Sport
- Sport: Athletics
- Event: Javelin throw

Achievements and titles
- Personal best: Javelin: 62.45m (2023)
Medal record
Women's athletics
Representing Finland
European Athletics U23 Championships
Bronze medal – third place	2023 Espoo	Javelin throw
European U20 Championships
Bronze medal – third place	2021 Tallinn	Javelin throw

Anni-Linnea Alanen (born 11 November 2002) is a Finnish javelin thrower. She is a multiple time national champion. She has represented Finland and multiple major championships, including the 2024 Olympic Games.

== Career ==
She is a member of the Oulu Pyrinnö athletics club in Oulu, Finland. She won her first national title at the Finnish Athletics Championships in the javelin throw in 2021, at the age of 18 years-old. Her winning throw of 59.52 metres set a national under-19 record. She was a bronze medalist at the 2021 European Athletics U20 Championships in Tallinn.

She competed in the javelin throw at the 2022 European Athletics Championships in Munich, Germany, throwing 52.09 metres and not progressing through to the final.

She was a bronze medalist at the 2023 European Athletics U23 Championships in Espoo, Finland. She won the 2023 Finnish Athletics Championships with a throw of 60.30 metres in July 2023. That month, she threw a personal best distance of 62.45 metres whilst competing in Finland. She competed at the 2023 World Athletics Championships in Budapest, Hungary, throwing 53.06 metres and did not qualify for the final.

In June 2024, she competed in the javelin throw at the 2024 European Athletics Championships in Rome, Italy, managing a distance of 53.03 metres without proceeding to the final. Later that month, she retained her Finnish national title at the Finnish Athletics Championships with a throw of 58.66 metres. She competed in the javelin at the 2024 Summer Olympics in Paris, France in August 2024, throwing 55.30 metres and did not progress to the final.
