= Federica Botter =

Italian Javelin Thrower

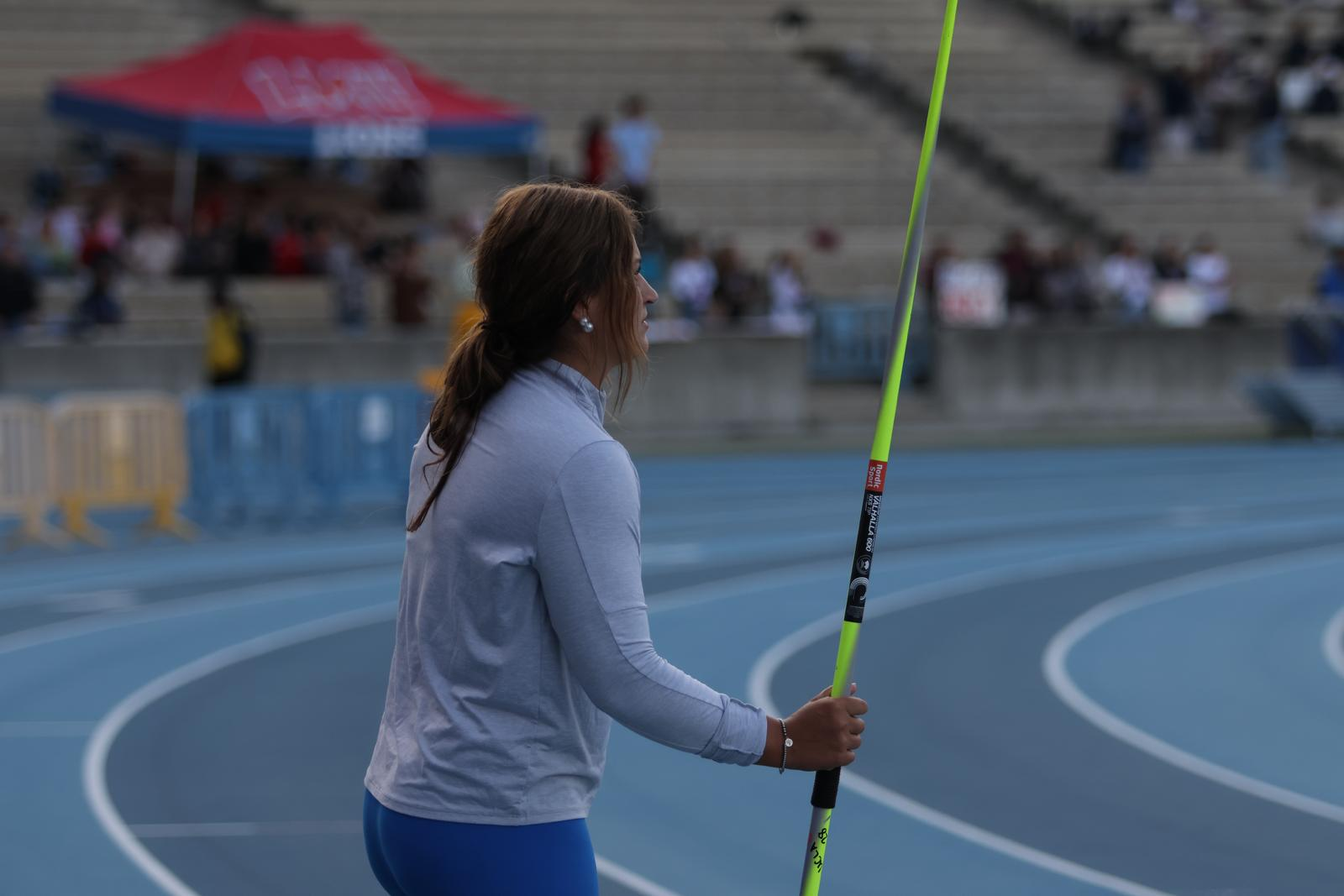
Federica Botter competing for UCLA

Federica Botter is an Italian javelin thrower from Venice, Italy. She is a member of the UCLA Track and Field Team since 2023 and part of the Italian National Team since 2016. Botter's PB is 58.72m and she is coached by Bridget Anderson.

== Biography ==
Federica Botter was born on January 23, 2001, in Udine, Italy. She has a personal best of 57.81m (Walnut, CA, 2023). She won 4 national titles (U16, U18, U20, U23), and a bronze medal at the 2022 winter Italian championship. Federica is ranked 8th in the Italian all-time list, and 2nd in the U23 all-time list. In September 2022 she won the silver medal at the U23 Mediterranean Games and she placed 5th at the U20 European Championship in Boras in 2019. She has been part of the Italian national team since 2016. Her Italian club is Atletica Brugnera Friulintagli.

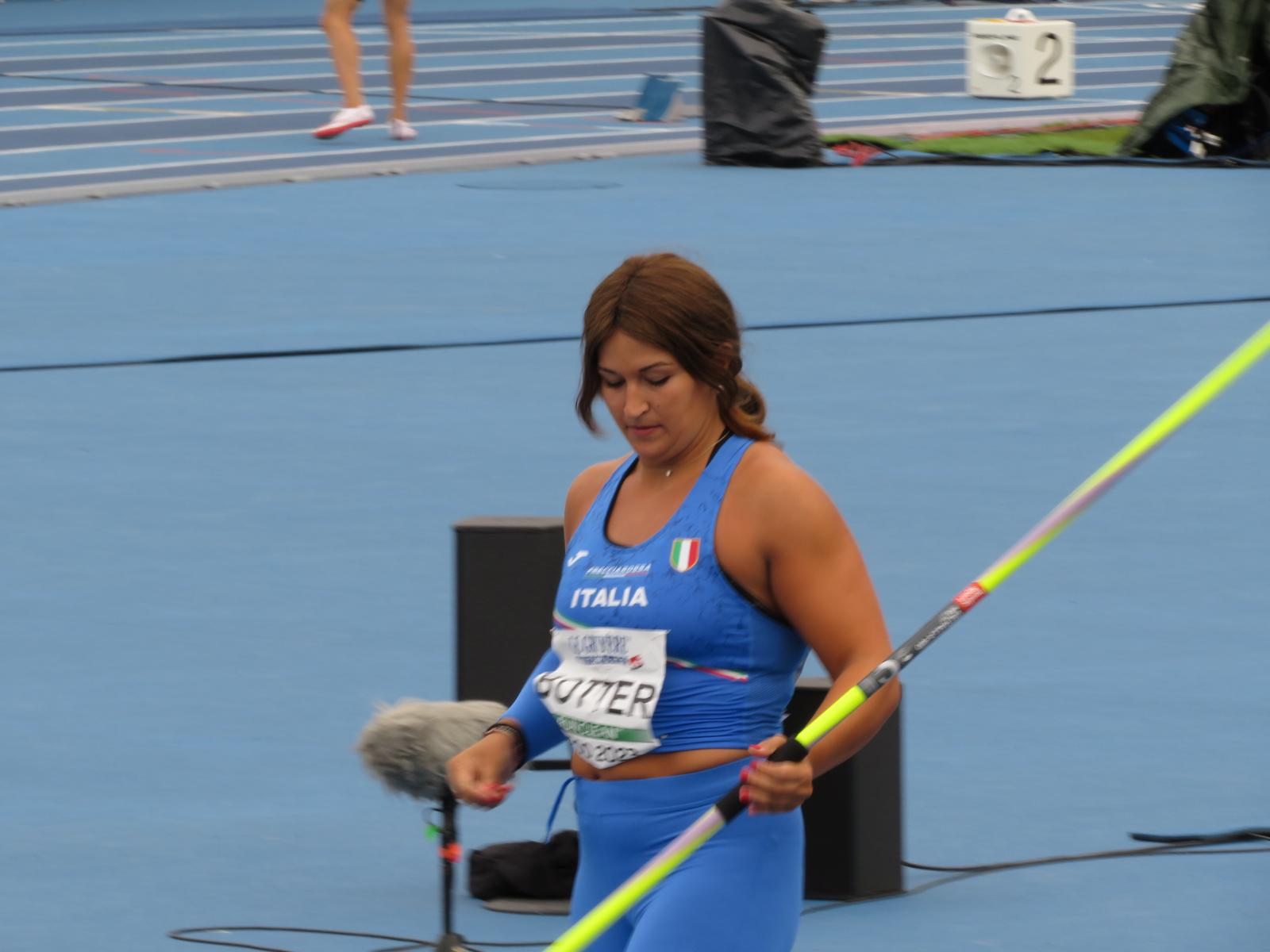
Federica Botter competing for the Italian national team in 2023

During the summer she suffered a few injuries, but Federica was part of the Italian national team that won the 2023 European Games and European Cup in Poland in June 2023, as well as the European Athletics U23 Championships (ESPOO), finishing eighth in the women's javelin throw with a mark of 53.72m and the FISU World University Games, placing 11th in the international meet.

== International competitions ==
- 2017- EYOF (Gyor, Hungary)- 8th place
- 2018- U18 European Championship (Gyor, Hungary)
- 2019- U20 European Championship (Boras, Sweden)- 5th place
- 2021- European Winter Throwing Cup (Split, Croatia)
- 2022- European Winter Throwing Cup (Portugal)
- 2022- U23 Mediterranean Games (Pescara, Italy)
- 2023- FISU World University Games (Chengdu, China)
- 2023- European Games (Poland)
- 2023- U23 European Championship (Espoo, Finland)
- 2024 - European Championship (Rome, Italy)

== NCAA ==
Since January 2023 she has been part of the UCLA track and field team. She set the new outdoor school record in her first competition on March 25, with a mark of 53.20m, throwing then 57.81m at the Pac-12 Championships (May 12), winning also the individual Conference title. Federica placed seventh in the nation, throwing 55.79m (183–00) at the University of Texas-hosted meet on June 8, and she earned First Team All-America for her first NCAA outdoor season.

In 2024 she threw 56.48m and won the meet at the Texas Relays in Austin. Then Botter placed second at the Mt. SAC Relays in Walnut, throwing 57.22m.
