= Petra Sičaková =

Czech javelin thrower (born 2003)

Personal information
- Born: 14 April 2003 (age 23)

Sport
- Sport: Athletics
- Event: Javelin throw

Achievements and titles
- Personal bests: Javelin: 60.91 m (Zagreb, 2024)
Medal record
Women's athletics
Representing Czech Republic
European U23 Championships
Silver medal – second place	2025 Bergen	Javelin throw
European Throwing Cup
Silver medal – second place	2023 Leiria	U23 Javelin throw

Petra Sičaková (born 14 April 2003) is a Czech javelin thrower. A Czech national champion for the first time in 2022, she competed at the 2024 Olympic Games. She won the silver medal at the 2025 European Athletics U23 Championships.

== Career ==
A member of AK Škoda Plzeň, she placed fifth in the U23 category in the javelin throw at the 2022 European Throwing Cup in Portugal.

She won the silver medal in the U23 tournament at the 2023 European Throwing Cup in Leiria. She became senior Czech national champion by winning the Czech Athletics Championships in July 2023 with a throw of 58.60 metres.

She was selected for the 2024 European Athletics Championships in Rome, Italy, where she did not reach the final from the preliminary heat, throwing 52.86 metres. She made her Olympic debut at the age of 21 years-old at the 2024 Olympic Games in Paris, France, but did not progress to the final finishing fourteenth in her qualifying group. She threw a new personal best of 60.91 metres whilst competing in Zagreb in September 2024.

In July 2025, she won the silver medal at the 2025 European Athletics U23 Championships in Bergen, Norway with a throw of 58.14 metres. She was runner-up to Andrea Železná at the Czech Athletics Championships in August 2025. She competed at the 2025 World Athletics Championships in Tokyo, Japan without advancing to the final.

In August 2026, she competed at the 2026 European Athletics Championships in Birmingham, England, in the javelin throw.
