= 2021 European Throwing Cup =

- Dates: 8–9 May
- Host city: Split, Croatia
- Level: Senior, Under 23
- Events: 16

The 2021 European Throwing Cup was hold on 8–9 May in Split, Croatia.

== Results ==
WL - the best result on the world lists in 2021	EL - the best result on European lists in 2021	CR - European Cup record
NR - national record	PB - personal record	SB - the best result of the season

=== Men ===
==== Seniors ====
Event	Gold		Silver		Bronze	
Shot put	(Romania) Andrei Toader	20.83 PB	(Portugal) Francisco Belo	20.47	(United Kingdom) Scott Lincoln	20.25
Discus throw	(Hungary) János Huszák	65.35	(Iceland) Guðni Valur Guðnason	63.66 SB	(Czech Republic) Marek Bárta	63.33
Hammer Throw	(Turkey) Eşref Apak	75.99	(United Kingdom) Chris Bennett	75.36	(France) Yann Chaussinand	74.54
Javelin throw	(Germany) Johannes Vetter	91.12	(Moldova) Andrian Mardare	86.66 NR	(Belarus) Pavel Mialeshka	82.55

==== U23 ====
Event	Gold		Silver		Bronze	
Shot put	(Belarus) Dzmitry Karpuk	19.99	(Greece) Odisséas Mouzenídis	19.81	(Turkey) Alperen Karahan	19.48
Discus throw	(Belarus) Yauheni Bahutski	64.37 CR	(Cyprus) Giorgos Koniarakis	59.31 PB	(France) Tom Reux	58.11
Hammer throw	(Greece) Christos Frantzeskakis	75.10 SB	(Poland) Dawid Piłat	71.29 WU20L PB	(Portugal) Rúben Antunes	71.05 PB
Javelin throw	(France) Teura’itera’i Tupaia	80.46 PB	(Belarus) Pavel Sasimovich	77.23 SB	(Finland) Topias Laine	76.84 SB

=== Women ===
==== Seniors ====
Event	Gold		Silver		Bronze	
Shot put	(Germany) Sara Gambetta	18.86 EL PB	(Belarus) Aliona Dubitskaya	18.79 SB	(Turkey) Emel Dereli	18.29 SB
Discus throw	(Portugal) Liliana Cá	62.80	(Portugal) Irina Rodrigues	62.79 SB	(Germany) Shanice Craft	62.05
Hammer Throw	(Poland) Malwina Kopron	72.82	(Poland) Anita Włodarczyk	72.37	(France) Alexandra Tavernier	70.55
Javelin throw	(Poland) Maria Andrejczyk	71.40 WL CR NR	(Germany) Christin Hussong	66.44 SB	(Belarus) Tatsiana Khaladovich	62.88

==== U23 ====
Event	Gold		Silver		Bronze	
Shot put	(Turkey) Pınar Akyol	17.65 WU20L	(Sweden) Axelina Johansson	17.50 PB	(France) Amanda Ngandu-Ntumba	16.09 PB
Discus throw	(Turkey) Özlem Becerek	57.02 NU20R	(France) Amanda Ngandu-Ntumba	55.48	(Denmark) Annesofie Hartmann Nielsen	54.21 PB
Hammer Throw	(Poland) Ewa Różańska	67.46	(Italy) Cecilia Desideri	63.99	(Denmark) Katrine Koch Jacobsen	63.67
Javelin throw	(Serbia) Adriana Vilagoš	60.22	(Finland) Julia Valtanen	56.24	(Belarus) Karyna Butkevich	56.20

== Medal table ==
Place	Country	(gold) Gold	(silver) Silver	(bronze) Bronze	Total
1.	Poland	3	2	0	5
2.	Turkey	3	0	2	5
3.	Belarus	2	2	3	7
4.	Germany	2	1	1	4
5.	Portugal	1	2	1	4
6.	France	1	1	4	6
7.	Greece	1	1	0	2
8.	Romania	1	0	0	1
8.	Serbia	1	0	0	1
8.	Hungary	1	0	0	1
11.	Finland	0	1	1	2
11.	United Kingdom	0	1	1	2
13.	Cyprus	0	1	0	1
13.	Iceland	0	1	0	1
13.	Moldova	0	1	0	1
13.	Sweden	0	1	0	1
13.	Italy	0	1	0	1
18.	Denmark	0	0	2	2
19.	Czech Republic	0	0	1	1

== Team standings ==
=== Senior men ===
Place	State	Points
1.	Germany	4489
2.	Poland	4378
3.	Belarus	4312
4.	Italy	4311
5.	Spain	4304
6.	Hungary	4258
7.	Czech Republic	4133
8.	Croatia	3910

=== Senior women ===
Place	State	Points
1.	Poland	4549
2.	Germany	4519
3.	Belarus	4317
4.	Czech Republic	4104
5.	Italy	4094
6.	Turkey	4061
7.	Finland	4046
8.	Hungary	3994
9.	France	3901
10.	Croatia	3799

=== Under 23 men ===
Place	State	Points
1.	Belarus	4277
2.	France	4109
3.	Poland	4054
4.	Italy	3964
5.	Turkey	3785
6.	Czech Republic	3692

=== Under 23 women ===
Place	State	Points
1.	Turkey	3934
2.	Belarus	3715
3.	Poland	3612
4.	Italy	3569
5.	Croatia	3175
