= Adriana Vilagoš =

Serbian javelin thrower (born 2004)

- Vilagoš in 2022

Personal information
- National team: Serbia
- Born: 2 January 2004 (age 22) Vrbas, Serbia, Serbia and Montenegro
- Height: 1.76 m (5 ft 9 in)
- Weight: 72.5 kg (160 lb)

Sport
- Country: Serbia
- Sport: Athletics
- Event: Javelin throw
- Coached by: Đerđi Vilagoš

Achievements and titles
- Personal best: 67.22 m (2025) (NR)
Medal record
Women's athletics
Representing Serbia
European Championships
Silver medal – second place	2022 Munich	Javelin throw
Silver medal – second place	2024 Rome	Javelin throw
Bronze medal – third place	2026 Birmingham	Javelin throw
Diamond League
Second place	2024	Javelin throw
Second place	2025	Javelin throw
Mediterranean Games
Gold medal – first place	2022 Oran	Javelin throw
Gold medal – first place	2026 Taranto	Javelin throw
European Throwing Cup
Gold medal – first place	2025 Nicosia	Javelin Throw
Silver medal – second place	2024 Leiria	Javelin Throw
Silver medal – second place	2026 Nicosia	Javelin Throw
Bronze medal – third place	2023 Leiria	Javelin throw
World U20 Championships
Gold medal – first place	2021 Nairobi	Javelin throw
Gold medal – first place	2022 Cali	Javelin throw
European U23 Championships
Gold medal – first place	2025 Bergen	Javelin throw
European U20 Championships
Gold medal – first place	2023 Jerusalem	Javelin throw
Silver medal – second place	2021 Tallinn	Javelin throw

Adriana Vilagoš (Serbian Cyrillic: Адриана Вилагош; Hungarian: Világos Adriana; born 2 January 2004) is a Serbian athlete who specializes in the javelin throw. At the age of 18, she won silver medal at the 2022 European Athletics Championships, becoming the youngest ever European medallist in a throwing event. One year prior, Vilagoš was for the first time the World Under-20 Champion and earned silver medal at the European U20 Championships successfully defending her World U20 title in 2022 and breaking championship and European U20 records in the process.

== Early life and background ==
Vilagoš was raised in Mali Iđoš in north Serbia, being of Hungarian descent. She started out when she was a kid by playing handball and throwing a vortex – a small, egg shaped foam missile with an aerodynamic tail.

She has been coached from the beginning by her mother Đerđi, originally a handball coach and a public prosecutor. They watched YouTube videos to learn the technique (by men's world record-holder Jan Železný among others).

== Career ==
In 2018, only 14, Vilagoš threw a Serbian under-18 (javelin 500 g) record of 59.69 m, which she improved to 64.73 m a year later.

In March 2020, she set a world record under-18 best with a throw of 68.76 m in Sremska Mitrovica, breaking 2019 record of Elina Tzengko (65.90 m), her two years older rival from Greece.

At the 2021 Balkan Athletics Championships held in Smederevo, Serbia in June, Vilagoš lost only to Tzengko to take the silver medal. This result of their competition was repeated in July at the European Athletics U20 Championships in Tallinn, Estonia. On 14 August at the Balkan U18 Championships in Kraljevo, Vilagoš bettered her world under-18 best with a 70.10 m performance, becoming the first U18 woman in history to break the 70-metre barrier. Just five days later, she beat Tzengko to gold for the first time at the World U20 Championships held in Nairobi, Kenya, setting a national U20 record. Vilagoš also had several performances during the year which were better than Tatjana Jelača's national U23 record of 60.89 m. However, for record purposes Serbian Athletics Federation (SAS) recognizes only the period following the end of athlete's junior eligibility up to the year in which the athlete turns 22-years-old, making Vilagoš eligible for U23 record consideration only during the 2024–2026 period.

In 2022, the 18-year-old placed in the top three in 15 of her 16 competitions, consistently throwing beyond 60 metres and finishing ahead of experienced senior opponents. She won for the second consecutive time U23 competition of the European Throwing Cup, triumphed in the Balkan Championships, Mediterranean Games, and captured decisively her second world u20 title at the World U20 Championships staged in Cali, Colombia, setting a championship and European U20 record of 63.52 m. She placed second behind only Tzengko and ahead of great Barbora Špotáková at her first senior European Championships Munich 2022. Adriana achieved 11 world's best U20 performances of the season, and was voted World Athletics Female Rising Star of the Year.

In 2024 alone she set new national record four times. In October she was awarded the Rising Star trophy at the Golden Tracks awards by the European Athletic Association (EAA), while her mother received Coaching Award. In 2025 she set two new national records at European Throwing Cup in Cyprus (66.88 m) and at Easter meeting in Split (67.22 m).

At the 2026 European Championships in Birmingham, England, Vilagoš won the bronze medal in the javelin with a throw of 60.93 metres. She also triumphed at the Mediterranean Games in Taranto with a Games-record throw of 65.93 m.

== International competitions ==
Representing Serbia
Year	Competition	Venue	Position	Event	Result	Notes
2021	European Throwing Cup	Split, Croatia	1st	Javelin throw (U23)	60.22 m	
2021	Balkan Championships	Smederevo, Serbia	2nd	Javelin throw	60.94 m	NU20R
2021	European U20 Championships	Tallinn, Estonia	2nd	Javelin throw	60.44 m	
2021	World U20 Championships	Nairobi, Kenya	1st	Javelin throw	61.46 m	WU20L NU20R
2022	European Throwing Cup	Leiria, Portugal	1st	Javelin throw (U23)	60.72 m	WU20L
2022	Balkan Championships	Craiova, Romania	1st	Javelin throw	60.51 m	
2022	Mediterranean Games	Oran, Algeria	1st	Javelin throw	60.22 m	
2022	World U20 Championships	Cali, Colombia	1st	Javelin throw	63.52 m	CR WU20L AU20R
2022	European Championships	Munich, Germany	2nd	Javelin throw	62.01 m	
2023	European Throwing Cup	Leiria, Portugal	3rd	Javelin throw	59.83 m	WU20L
2023	Balkan Championships	Kraljevo, Serbia	1st	Javelin throw	60.62 m	
2023	European U20 Championships	Jerusalem, Israel	1st	Javelin throw	58.38 m	
2023	World Championships	Budapest, Hungary	16th (q)	Javelin throw	58.65 m	
2024	European Throwing Cup	Leiria, Portugal	2rd	Javelin throw	61.17 m	
2024	European Championships	Rome, Italy	2nd	Javelin throw	64.42 m	EU23L
2024	Olympic Games	Paris, France	13th	Javelin throw	60.49 m	
2024	Diamond League	Brussels, Belgium	2nd	Javelin throw	65.23 m	
2025	European Throwing Cup	Nicosia, Cyprus	1st	Javelin throw	66.88 m	NR
2025	European U23 Championships	Bergen, Norway	1st	Javelin throw	62.41 m	
2025	Diamond League	Zurich, Switzerland	2nd	Javelin throw	62.96 m	
2025	World Championships	Tokyo, Japan	8th	Javelin throw	61.29 m	
2026	European Championships	Birmingham, United Kingdom	3rd	Javelin throw	60.93 m	
2026	Mediterranean Games	Taranto, Italy	1st	Javelin throw	65.93 m	
2026	World Ultimate Championship	Budapest, Hungary	5th	Javelin throw	61.37 m	

== See also ==
- List of European under-18 bests in athletics
- List of world under-18 bests in athletics
- List of European under-20 records in athletics
- Serbian records in athletics
