= Athletics at the 2019 European Games – Women's javelin throw =

Javelin throw event

Women's javelin throw at the 2019 European Games
- Venue: Dinamo Stadium, Minsk
- Date: 23 June
- Winning distance: 64.37

Medalists
gold medal	Tatsiana Khaladovich	Belarus
silver medal	Yekaterina Starygina	Russia
bronze medal	Madara Palameika	Latvia

The women's javelin throw event at the 2019 European Games in Minsk took place on 23 June. The winners in this discipline were determined during the qualifications for Dynamic New Athletics.

== Results ==
Rank	Match	Athlete	Nation	Result	Notes
1st place, gold medalist(s)	3	Tatsiana Khaladovich	Belarus	64.37	
2nd place, silver medalist(s)	2	Yekaterina Starygina	Russia	63.57	PB
3rd place, bronze medalist(s)	3	Madara Palameika	Latvia	63.22	SB
4	2	Liina Laasma	Estonia	61.88	
5	4	Eda Tuğsuz	Turkey	60.35	
6	3	Nikola Ogrodníková	Czech Republic	59.49	
7	3	Liveta Jasiūnaitė	Lithuania	59.38	
8	4	Hanna Hatsko-Fedusova	Ukraine	58.46	
9	1	Annika Fuchs	Germany	58.23	
10	1	Annabella Bogdán	Hungary	54.70	SB
11	3	Karolina Bołdysz	Poland	53.41	
12	2	Sara Jemai	Italy	52.68	
13	4	Marie Vestergaard	Denmark	52.31	SB
14	4	Lidia Parada	Spain	52.17	SB
15	1	Sofia Yfantidou	Greece	52.12	
16	2	Alexia Kogut-Kubiak	France	51.56	
17	2	Zoja Šušteršič	Slovenia	51.10	
18	2	Ioana Plăvan	Romania	49.71	
19	1	Lena Meyer	Switzerland	46.08	SB
20	4	Mikhaela Petkova	Bulgaria	44.23	SB
21	4	Jessica Barreira	Portugal	43.61	
22	1	Georgia Papadopoulou	Cyprus	40.98	
23	1	Júlia Hanuliaková	Slovakia	40.23	
24	3	Grace Casey	Ireland	40.11	
