= 2016 European Athletics Championships – Women's javelin throw =

Women's javelin throw at the European Athletics Championships
- Venue: Museumplein (qualification); Olympic Stadium (final)
- Location: Amsterdam
- Dates: 7 July (qualification); 9 July (final)
- Competitors: 35 from 21 nations
- Winning mark: 66.34 m NR

Medalists
gold medal	Tatsiana Khaladovich	Belarus
silver medal	Linda Stahl	Germany
bronze medal	Sara Kolak	Croatia

The women's javelin throw at the 2016 European Athletics Championships took place at the Olympic stadium for the finals and at the Museumplein for qualifying on 7 and 9 July.

== Records ==
Standing records prior to the 2016 European Athletics Championships
World record	Barbora Špotáková (CZE)	72.28 m	Stuttgart, Germany	13 September 2008
European record	Barbora Špotáková (CZE)	72.28 m	Stuttgart, Germany	13 September 2008
Championship record	Mirela Manjani (GRE)	67.47 m	Munich, Germany	8 August 2002
World Leading	Barbora Špotáková (CZE)	66.87 m	Tábor, Czech Republic	19 June 2016
European Leading	Barbora Špotáková (CZE)	66.87 m	Tábor, Czech Republic	19 June 2016

== Schedule ==
Date	Time	Round
7 July 2016	12:00	Qualification
9 July 2016	18:45	Final

All times are local times (UTC+2)

== Results ==
=== Qualification ===
Qualification: 60.00 m (Q) or best 12 performances (q)

Rank	Group	Name	Nationality	#1	#2	#3	Result	Note
1	A	Barbora Špotáková	Czech Republic	58.69	63.73		63.73	Q
2	A	Katharina Molitor	Germany	60.75			60.75	Q
3	B	Sara Kolak	Croatia	55.11	60.51		60.51	Q
4	A	Martina Ratej	Slovenia	58.69	60.38		60.38	Q
5	A	Linda Stahl	Germany	57.64	60.35		60.35	Q
6	B	Madara Palameika	Latvia	56.18	59.71	r	59.71	q
7	A	Jenni Kangas	Finland	59.48	56.26	55.01	59.48	q, PB
8	A	Tatsiana Khaladovich	Belarus	55.57	58.08	59.37	59.37	q
9	A	Hanna Hatsko-Fedusova	Ukraine	x	x	59.34	59.34	q
10	A	Ásdís Hjálmsdóttir	Iceland	56.69	58.83	x	58.83	q
11	B	Liveta Jasiūnaite	Lithuania	58.21	54.04	x	58.21	q
12	A	Eda Tuğsuz	Turkey	58.13	54.49	52.17	58.13	q
13	A	Maria Andrejczyk	Poland	57.93	x	55.00	57.93	
14	A	Sinta Ozoliņa-Kovala	Latvia	57.01	x	57.58	57.58	
15	B	Lidia Parada	Spain	57.34	x	56.31	57.34	SB
16	B	Sanni Utriainen	Finland	57.19	53.46	x	57.19	
17	B	Christin Hussong	Germany	55.19	57.17	52.37	57.17	
18	B	Liina Laasma	Estonia	56.23	56.61	x	56.61	
19	A	Sigrid Borge	Norway	56.30	52.37	x	56.30	
20	B	Matilde Andraud	France	55.28	51.78	51.89	55.28	
21	B	Réka Szilágyi	Hungary	53.58	55.19	51.80	55.19	
22	B	Marcelina Witek	Poland	55.03	x	x	55.03	
23	B	Sofi Flink	Sweden	50.50	54.38	54.18	54.38	
24	A	Anna Wessman	Sweden	52.88	54.02	x	54.02	
25	B	Jarmila Jurkovičová	Czech Republic	53.96	53.83	53.64	53.96	
26	B	Goldie Sayers	Great Britain	52.60	53.56	x	53.56	
27	B	Kateryna Derun	Ukraine	52.92	x	x	52.92	
28	A	Tetyana Fetiskina	Ukraine	x	51.05	52.90	52.90	
29	B	Irena Šedivá	Czech Republic	51.25	52.48	52.37	52.48	
30	B	Heidi Nokelainen	Finland	51.57	52.40	47.90	52.40	
31	A	Marija Vučenović	Serbia	x	49.18	x	49.18	
	B	Margaryta Dorozhon	Israel	x	x	x	NM	
	A	Indrė Jakubaitytė	Lithuania	x	x	x	NM	
	A	Līna Mūze	Latvia	x	r		NM	
	B	Tatsiana Korzh	Belarus				DNS	

=== Final ===
Rank	Athlete	Nationality	#1	#2	#3	#4	#5	#6	Result	Notes
1st place, gold medalist(s)	Tatsiana Khaladovich	Belarus	61.82	66.34	62.91	65.79	62.94	60.71	66.34	NR
2nd place, silver medalist(s)	Linda Stahl	Germany	60.40	60.80	59.19	59.31	x	65.25	65.25	SB
3rd place, bronze medalist(s)	Sara Kolak	Croatia	58.89	55.32	63.50	58.45	58.32	x	63.50	NR
4	Katharina Molitor	Germany	59.87	63.20	62.89	58.82	x	58.26	63.20	
5	Barbora Špotáková	Czech Republic	x	62.66	62.28	x	x	x	62.66	
6	Martina Ratej	Slovenia	60.65	58.29	59.89	x	55.47	x	60.65	
7	Madara Palameika	Latvia	x	60.39	x	x	x	57.30	60.39	
8	Ásdís Hjálmsdóttir	Iceland	60.37	57.97	x	55.14	x	59.97	60.37	
9	Jenni Kangas	Finland	53.97	58.61	59.41				59.41	
10	Hanna Hatsko-Fedusova	Ukraine	56.89	58.86	x				58.86	
11	Eda Tuğsuz	Turkey	56.97	52.92	x				56.97	
12	Liveta Jasiūnaitė	Lithuania	53.41	53.94	52.49				53.94	
