= 2010 World Junior Championships in Athletics – Women's javelin throw =

The women's javelin throw event at the 2010 World Junior Championships in Athletics was held in Moncton, New Brunswick, Canada, at Moncton Stadium on 20 and 21 July.

== Medalists ==
| Gold | Sanni Utriainen; Finland |
| Silver | Līna Mūze; Latvia |
| Bronze | Tazmin Brits; South Africa |

== Results ==
=== Final ===
21 July

| Rank | Name | Nationality | Attempts | | | | | | Result | Notes |
| Rank | Name | Nationality | 1 | 2 | 3 | 4 | 5 | 6 | Result | Notes |
|---|---|---|---|---|---|---|---|---|---|---|
| 1st place, gold medalist(s) | Sanni Utriainen | Finland | 54.31 | 49.92 | x | x | 55.36 | 56.69 | 56.69 | |
| 2nd place, silver medalist(s) | Līna Mūze | Latvia | 49.44 | x | 45.82 | 56.64 | x | 54.57 | 56.64 | |
| 3rd place, bronze medalist(s) | Tazmin Brits | South Africa | 50.25 | x | 48.41 | 54.55 | 53.79 | x | 54.55 | |
| 4 | María Lucelly Murillo | Colombia | 46.95 | 54.44 | 51.84 | 50.58 | x | 51.95 | 54.44 | |
| 5 | Rafaela Gonçalves | Brazil | 50.61 | 52.50 | 53.29 | 50.22 | x | 49.81 | 53.29 | |
| 6 | Lismania Muñoz | Cuba | 51.97 | x | 49.87 | 50.26 | 52.87 | 48.75 | 52.87 | |
| 7 | Anna Habina | Ukraine | 50.61 | 50.13 | x | 50.70 | x | 48.68 | 50.70 | |
| 8 | Allison Updike | United States | 50.08 | 49.87 | 48.46 | x | x | 47.70 | 50.08 | |
| 9 | Lisanne Schol | Netherlands | 44.81 | 49.03 | x | | | | 49.03 | |
| 10 | Sarah Mayer | Germany | 48.89 | x | x | | | | 48.89 | |
| 11 | Tiffany Perkins | Canada | 45.83 | x | x | | | | 45.83 | |
| 12 | Chen Min-Fang | Chinese Taipei | 42.44 | 42.44 | 42.42 | | | | 42.44 | |

=== Qualifications ===
20 July

==== Group A ====
| Rank | Name | Nationality | Attempts | | | Result | Notes |
| Rank | Name | Nationality | 1 | 2 | 3 | Result | Notes |
|---|---|---|---|---|---|---|---|
| 1 | Sanni Utriainen | Finland | 47.88 | 45.33 | 55.27 | 55.27 | Q |
| 2 | Līna Mūze | Latvia | 54.87 | - | - | 54.87 | Q |
| 3 | Lismania Muñoz | Cuba | 47.31 | 52.99 | 51.69 | 52.99 | q |
| 4 | Lisanne Schol | Netherlands | 45.74 | 46.77 | 48.92 | 48.92 | q |
| 5 | Tazmin Brits | South Africa | 48.68 | 48.10 | 47.79 | 48.68 | q |
| 6 | Emelie Larsson | Sweden | 42.93 | 47.68 | 48.26 | 48.26 | |
| 7 | Avione Allgood | United States | 45.55 | 48.00 | 45.31 | 48.00 | |
| 8 | Wu I-Wen | Chinese Taipei | 41.82 | 46.70 | 44.47 | 46.70 | |
| 9 | Gülsüm Günes | Turkey | 46.68 | 45.86 | 45.30 | 46.68 | |
| 10 | Laura Henkel | Germany | 46.29 | 45.49 | 43.25 | 46.29 | |
| 11 | Vilma Rantalainen | Finland | 40.28 | 43.48 | 38.08 | 43.48 | |
| 12 | Betzabet Menéndez | Mexico | 39.31 | 43.26 | 42.96 | 43.26 | |

==== Group B ====
| Rank | Name | Nationality | Attempts | | | Result | Notes |
| Rank | Name | Nationality | 1 | 2 | 3 | Result | Notes |
|---|---|---|---|---|---|---|---|
| 1 | María Lucelly Murillo | Colombia | 49.16 | 51.99 | 50.42 | 51.99 | q |
| 2 | Sarah Mayer | Germany | 50.86 | 48.44 | 49.11 | 50.86 | q |
| 3 | Rafaela Gonçalves | Brazil | 50.13 | 49.62 | x | 50.13 | q |
| 4 | Anna Habina | Ukraine | 49.87 | 49.94 | x | 49.94 | q |
| 5 | Allison Updike | United States | 46.80 | 47.03 | 48.93 | 48.93 | q |
| 6 | Chen Min-Fang | Chinese Taipei | 48.82 | 48.01 | 43.18 | 48.82 | q |
| 7 | Tiffany Perkins | Canada | 48.46 | x | 42.59 | 48.46 | q |
| 8 | Liina Laasma | Estonia | 43.85 | 44.17 | 48.22 | 48.22 | |
| 9 | Marija Vucenovic | Serbia | 47.86 | 48.10 | 46.67 | 48.10 | |
| 10 | Karolina Mor | Poland | 47.96 | x | 47.25 | 47.96 | |
| 11 | Tatsiana Khaladovich | Belarus | 45.99 | 45.29 | x | 45.99 | |

== Participation ==
According to an unofficial count, 23 athletes from 19 countries participated in the event.

- Belarus (1)
- Brazil (1)
- Canada (1)
- Chinese Taipei (2)
- Colombia (1)
- Cuba (1)
- Estonia (1)
- Finland (2)
- Germany (2)
- Latvia (1)
- Mexico (1)
- Netherlands (1)
- Poland (1)
- Serbia (1)
- South Africa (1)
- Sweden (1)
- Turkey (1)
- Ukraine (1)
- United States (2)
