= 2016 German Athletics Championships =

- Dates: 18–19 June 2016
- Host city: Kassel, Germany
- Venue: Auestadion
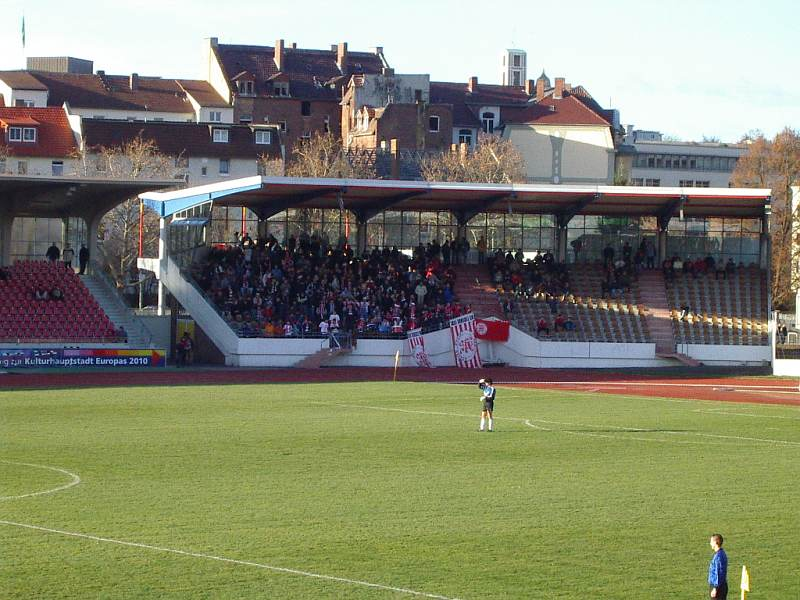

The 2016 German Athletics Championships were held at the Auestadion in Kassel on 18–19 June 2016.

== Results ==
=== Men ===
	Gold		Silver		Bronze	
100 m (−2.3 m/s)	Julian Reus	10.30	Robert Hering	10.48	Peter Emelieze	10.49
200 m (+1.9 m/s)	Robin Erewa	20.59	Robert Hering	20.62	Aleixo-Platini Menga	20.95
400 m	Johannes Trefz	46.59	Alhagie Drammeh	46.62	Patrick Schneider	46.93
800 m	Benedikt Huber	1:47.17	Sören Ludolph	1:47.80	Marc Reuther	1:47.82
1500 m	Timo Benitz	3:40.28	Homiyu Tesfaye	3:40.67	Florian Orth	3:40.67
5000 m	Richard Ringer	13:51.88	Martin Sperlich	13:56.27	Amanal Petros	13:58.10
110 m hurdles (+0.3 m/s)	Matthias Bühler	13.44	Gregor Traber	13.47	Alexander John	13.48
400 m hurdles	Felix Franz	50.42	Tobias Giehl	50.49	Florian Handt	50.94
3000 m steeplechase	Hannes Liebach	8:45.50	Patrick Karl	8:45.98	Martin Grau	8:48.97
High jump	Eike Onnen	2.20	Alexander Klintworth	2.10	Tim Schenker	2.10
Pole vault	Tobias Scherbarth	5.70 =	Karsten Dilla	5.65	Torben Laidig	5.45
Triple jump	Max Heß	17.06	Martin Jasper	16.55	Marcel Kornhardt	16.47
Long jump	Alyn Camara	7.92	Fabian Heinle	7.91	Jan Uder	7.70 ^{w}
Shot put	David Storl	20.75	Tobias Dahm	20.38	Patrick Müller	18.86
Discus throw	Robert Harting	68.04	Christoph Harting	66.41	Daniel Jasinski	65.18
Hammer throw	Alexander Ziegler	72.50	Garland Porter	71.00	Paul Hützen	70.56
Javelin throw	Thomas Röhler	86.81	Julian Weber	83.79	Andreas Hofmann	81.98
4 × 100 m relay	TV Wattenscheid 01 Maximilian Ruth; Robin Erewa; Maurice Huke; Julian Reus	39.48	TSV Bayer 04 Leverkusen Nico Menzel; Lukas Blechschmidt; Kai Köllmann; Thorben Blech	40.08	MTG Mannheim Fabian Manke-Reimers; Patrick Domogala; Jonas Kriesamer; Florian Hochdörffer	40.35
4 × 400 m relay	LG Stadtwerke München Benedikt Wiesend; Johannes Trefz; Laurin Walter; Tobias Giehl	3:10.84	VfL Eintracht Hannover Jannik Rehbein; Lenn Mügge; Marcin Jablonski; Alexander Juretzko	3:10.92	Stg. Schlüchtern-Flieden-Obertshausen Aleksi Rösler; Jaakkima Rösler; Eric Herbert; Constantin Schmidt	3:13.02

=== Women ===
	Gold		Silver		Bronze	
100 m (−2.1 m/s)	Tatjana Pinto	11.22	Lisa Mayer	11.34	Rebekka Haase	11.45
200 m (−0.5 m/s)	Gina Lückenkemper	22.84	Lisa Mayer	22.87	Nadine Gonska	23.03
400 m	Ruth Spelmeyer	52.17	Friederike Möhlenkamp	52.91	Laura Müller	53.03
800 m	Christina Hering	2:02.19	Fabienne Kohlmann	2:03.15	Tanja Spill	2:03.71
1500 m	Konstanze Klosterhalfen	4:07.92	Maren Kock	4:11.89	Diana Sujew	4:12.27
5000 m	Fate Tola	15:30.35	Agata Strausa	16:07.39	Anna Gehring	16:09.95
100 m hurdles (−0.1 m/s)	Cindy Roleder	12.86	Nadine Hildebrand	12.92	Ricarda Lobe	13.11
400 m hurdles	Jackie Baumann	56.87	Eileen Demes	57.87	Christine Salterberg	57.95
3000 m steeplechase	Gesa Felicitas Krause	9:31.00	Maya Rehberg	9:46.58	Sanaa Koubaa	9:48.07
High jump	Marie-Laurence Jungfleisch	1.90	Katarina Mögenburg	1.84	Jossie Graumann	1.84 =
Pole vault	Martina Strutz	4.70	Lisa Ryzih	4.65	Annika Roloff	4.55
Triple jump	Jenny Elbe	14.28 ^{w}	Kristin Gierisch	14.05	Birte Damerius	13.57
Long jump	Malaika Mihambo	6.72 ^{w}	Alexandra Wester	6.64	Maryse Luzolo	6.54
Shot put	Christina Schwanitz	19.49	Lena Urbaniak	18.02	Sara Gambetta	17.46
Discus throw	Nadine Müller	65.79	Julia Fischer	63.94	Shanice Craft	63.63
Hammer throw	Betty Heidler	75.32	Kathrin Klaas	69.95	Charlene Woitha	67.06
Javelin throw	Christin Hussong	66.41	Katharina Molitor	62.86	Linda Stahl	61.44
4 × 100 m relay	MTG Mannheim Ricarda Lobe; Alexandra Burghardt; Nadine Gonska; Yasmin Kwadwo	43.55	TV Wattenscheid 01 Monika Zapalska; Keshia Kwadwo; Pamela Dutkiewicz; Anne Christina Haack	43.98	LC Paderborn Josefina Elsler; Janina Kölsch; Tatjana Pinto; Ina Thimm	43.99
4 × 400 m relay	LT DSHS Köln Lena Naumann; Friederike Möhlenkamp; Christine Salterberg; Lara Hoffmann	3:36.76	TSV Bayer 04 Leverkusen Julia Schaefers; Frederike Hogrebe; Julia Förster; Carolin Walter	3:38.25	SCC Berlin Alena Gerken; Svea Köhrbrück; Fanny Fromm; Hendrikja Richter	3:41.73
