= 2018 European Athletics Championships – Women's javelin throw =

Women's javelin throw at the 2018 European Athletics Championships
- Venue: Olympic Stadium
- Location: Berlin
- Dates: August 9 (qualification); August 10 (final)
- Competitors: 23 from 17 nations
- Winning result: 67.90

Medalists
gold medal	Christin Hussong	Germany
silver medal	Nikola Ogrodníková	Czech Republic
bronze medal	Liveta Jasiūnaitė	Lithuania

The women's javelin throw at the 2018 European Athletics Championships took place at the Olympic Stadium on 9 and 10 August.

== Records ==
Standing records prior to the 2018 European Athletics Championships
World record	Barbora Špotáková (CZE)	72.28 m	Stuttgart, Germany	13 September 2008
European record	Barbora Špotáková (CZE)	72.28 m	Stuttgart, Germany	13 September 2008
Championship record	Mirela Manjani (GRE)	67.47 m	Munich, Germany	8 August 2002
World Leading	Kathryn Mitchell (AUS)	68.92 m	Gold Coast, Australia	11 April 2018
European Leading	Tatsiana Khaladovich (BLR)	67.47 m	Oslo, Norway	7 June 2018
Broken records during the 2018 European Athletics Championships
Championship record	Christin Hussong (GER)	67.90 m	Berlin, Germany	10 August 2018
European Leading	Christin Hussong (GER)	67.90 m	Berlin, Germany	10 August 2018

== Schedule ==
Date	Time	Round
9 August 2018	12:30	Qualification
10 August 2018	20:25	Final

All times are local times (UTC+2)

== Results ==
=== Qualification ===
Qualification: 60.50 m (Q) or best 12 performers (q )

Rank	Group	Name	Nationality	#1	#2	#3	Result	Note
1	A	Christin Hussong	Germany	67.29			67.29	Q, PB
2	B	Martina Ratej	Slovenia	61.69			61.69	Q
3	A	Liveta Jasiūnaitė	Lithuania	58.07	61.61		61.61	Q, =PB
4	A	Nikola Ogrodníková	Czech Republic	59.04	61.27		61.27	Q
5	B	Tatsiana Khaladovich	Belarus	59.08	x	61.21	61.21	Q
6	A	Madara Palameika	Latvia	57.44	x	60.21	60.21	q
7	A	Marija Vučenović	Serbia	47.94	59.98	54.89	59.98	q
8	A	Jenni Kangas	Finland	59.96	x	59.09	59.96	q, SB
9	B	Sofi Flink	Sweden	57.92	57.46	59.58	59.58	q
10	B	Sigrid Borge	Norway	57.35	x	59.55	59.55	q
11	B	Irena Šedivá	Czech Republic	x	59.34	–	59.34	q
12	A	Alexie Alaïs	France	53.03	59.29	54.65	59.29	q
13	A	Ásdís Hjálmsdóttir	Iceland	58.64	x	56.41	58.64	
14	B	Lidia Parada	Spain	58.08	x	55.59	58.08	
15	B	Katharina Molitor	Germany	55.34	56.85	58.00	58.00	
16	B	Eda Tuğsuz	Turkey	57.75	x	57.77	57.77	
17	B	Anete Kociņa	Latvia	55.45	57.48	56.66	57.48	
18	A	Arantxa Moreno	Spain	55.30	56.33	55.09	56.33	
19	A	Līna Mūze	Latvia	51.88	53.83	53.95	53.95	
20	A	Dana Bergrath	Germany	53.61	x	x	53.61	
21	A	Hanna Hatsko-Fedusova	Ukraine	50.50	52.86	53.08	53.08	
22	B	Sofia Yfantidou	Greece	45.65	52.26	x	52.26	
	B	Liina Laasma	Estonia	x	x	x	NM	

=== Final ===
Rank	Athlete	Nationality	#1	#2	#3	#4	#5	#6	Result	Notes
1st place, gold medalist(s)	Christin Hussong	Germany	67.90	62.53	x	x	x	59.15	67.90	CR
2nd place, silver medalist(s)	Nikola Ogrodníková	Czech Republic	61.85	59.23	61.05	x	x	61.81	61.85	
3rd place, bronze medalist(s)	Liveta Jasiūnaitė	Lithuania	60.51	58.24	61.00	61.59	60.38	x	61.59	
4	Martina Ratej	Slovenia	60.64	x	61.41	x	58.62	59.70	61.41	
5	Tatsiana Khaladovich	Belarus	60.92	x	x	60.06	x	60.27	60.92	
6	Alexie Alaïs	France	60.01	57.19	59.69	56.99	57.42	57.71	60.01	
7	Irena Šedivá	Czech Republic	59.76	53.22	58.42	58.36	58.75	58.96	59.76	
8	Sigrid Borge	Norway	54.88	59.60	59.40	x	x	x	59.60	
9	Madara Palameika	Latvia	x	x	57.98				57.98	
10	Sofi Flink	Sweden	55.70	56.68	56.91				56.91	
11	Marija Vučenović	Serbia	50.75	55.23	51.67				55.23	
12	Jenni Kangas	Finland	53.97	54.18	54.92				54.92	
