= 2015 European Athletics U23 Championships – Women's javelin throw =

The women's javelin throw event at the 2015 European Athletics U23 Championships was held in Tallinn, Estonia, at Kadriorg Stadium on 9 and 11 July.

== Medalists ==
| Gold | Christin Hussong; Germany |
| Silver | Kateryna Derun; Ukraine |
| Bronze | Liveta Jasiūnaitė; Lithuania |

== Results ==
=== Final ===
11 July

| Rank | Name | Nationality | Attempts | | | | | | Result | Notes |
| Rank | Name | Nationality | 1 | 2 | 3 | 4 | 5 | 6 | Result | Notes |
|---|---|---|---|---|---|---|---|---|---|---|
| 1st place, gold medalist(s) | Christin Hussong | Germany | 62.07 | x | 59.40 | 65.60 | x | x | 65.60 | NUR PB |
| 2nd place, silver medalist(s) | Kateryna Derun | Ukraine | 48.55 | 52.51 | x | 55.23 | 55.27 | 58.60 | 58.60 | SB |
| 3rd place, bronze medalist(s) | Liveta Jasiūnaitė | Lithuania | 51.35 | 50.30 | 52.72 | 52.08 | 55.77 | 54.70 | 55.77 | SB |
| 4 | Sigrid Borge | Norway | 47.75 | 49.45 | 51.71 | 48.42 | 55.72 | x | 55.72 | PB |
| 5 | Arantxa Moreno | Spain | 50.69 | 54.82 | 51.24 | 55.11 | 55.32 | 53.69 | 55.32 | |
| 6 | Lidia Parada | Spain | 52.21 | 54.09 | x | 50.82 | x | 49.64 | 54.09 | |
| 7 | Marija Vučenović | Serbia | 52.72 | x | 53.82 | 53.09 | 53.80 | 50.98 | 53.82 | SB |
| 8 | Tatsiana Korzh | Belarus | x | x | 52.54 | x | P | P | 52.54 | |
| 9 | Tetyana Fetiskina | Ukraine | 50.43 | x | x | | | | 50.43 | |
| 10 | Marcelina Witek | Poland | 47.22 | 50.38 | 49.83 | | | | 50.38 | |
| 11 | Katrina Sirmā | Latvia | x | 49.22 | 49.46 | | | | 49.46 | |
| 12 | Olga Shestakova | Russia | 48.52 | 48.45 | 49.19 | | | | 49.19 | |

=== Qualifications ===
9 July

| Rank | Name | Nationality | Attempts | | | Result | Notes |
| Rank | Name | Nationality | 1 | 2 | 3 | Result | Notes |
|---|---|---|---|---|---|---|---|
| 1 | Christin Hussong | Germany | 52.71 | 62.59 | | 62.59 | SB Q |
| 2 | Kateryna Derun | Ukraine | 53.52 | 54.92 | 51.54 | 54.92 | q |
| 3 | Lidia Parada | Spain | 54.87 | 54.17 | 51.03 | 54.87 | q |
| 4 | Arantxa Moreno | Spain | 54.18 | 54.77 | – | 54.77 | q |
| 5 | Tatsiana Korzh | Belarus | 52.31 | x | – | 52.31 | q |
| 6 | Tetyana Fetiskina | Ukraine | 51.92 | x | 49.06 | 51.92 | q |
| 7 | Marcelina Witek | Poland | 51.20 | x | 49.03 | 51.20 | q |
| 8 | Marija Vučenović | Serbia | 50.61 | 50.63 | 50.99 | 50.99 | q |
| 9 | Olga Shestakova | Russia | 48.91 | 49.94 | x | 49.94 | q |
| 10 | Sigrid Borge | Norway | 49.80 | 48.31 | 48.78 | 49.80 | q |
| 11 | Katrina Sirmā | Latvia | 43.76 | 48.08 | 49.70 | 49.70 | SB q |
| 12 | Liveta Jasiūnaitė | Lithuania | 46.20 | 45.89 | 49.37 | 49.37 | q |
| 13 | Yekaterina Starygina | Russia | 45.98 | 47.57 | 48.92 | 48.92 | |
| 14 | Christine Winkler | Germany | 48.10 | 46.22 | 48.71 | 48.71 | |
| 15 | Lena Marie Hansen | Norway | 48.25 | x | 44.96 | 48.25 | |
| 16 | Saara Lipsanen | Finland | x | 46.34 | 47.15 | 47.15 | |
| 17 | Katarina Gašparović | Croatia | 46.06 | x | 42.82 | 46.06 | |
| 18 | Esra Gaz | Turkey | 42.36 | 45.48 | x | 45.48 | |
| 19 | Kristina Kristianslund | Norway | 42.86 | 41.98 | 44.44 | 44.44 | |
| 20 | Simona Dobilaitė | Lithuania | 43.88 | 42.98 | x | 43.88 | |
| 21 | Paola Padovan | Italy | x | 43.69 | 43.74 | 43.74 | |
| 22 | Mari-Liis Tulev | Estonia | 42.88 | x | 43.24 | 43.24 | |
| 23 | Janette Lepistö | Finland | 40.99 | 40.97 | 42.54 | 42.54 | |
| | Margaux Nicollin | France | x | x | x | NM | |

== Participation ==
According to an unofficial count, 24 athletes from 16 countries participated in the event.

- Belarus (1)
- Croatia (1)
- Estonia (1)
- Finland (2)
- France (1)
- Germany (2)
- Italy (1)
- Latvia (1)
- Lithuania (2)
- Norway (3)
- Poland (1)
- Russia (2)
- Serbia (1)
- Spain (2)
- Turkey (1)
- Ukraine (2)
