= Athletics at the 2015 Summer Universiade – Women's javelin throw =

Video from the final

The women's javelin throw event at the 2015 Summer Universiade was held on 10 and 12 July at the Gwangju Universiade Main Stadium.

== Medalists ==
Gold	Silver	Bronze
Tatsiana Khaladovich; Belarus	Līna Mūze; Latvia	Irena Šedivá; Czech Republic

== Results ==
=== Qualification ===
Qualification: 59.00 m (Q) or at least 12 best (q) qualified for the final.

Rank	Group	Athlete	Nationality	#1	#2	#3	Result	Notes
1	A	Du Xiaowei	China	57.64	–	–	57.64	q
2	B	Tatsiana Khaladovich	Belarus	57.54	–	–	57.54	q
3	A	Līna Mūze	Latvia	55.52	54.80	55.87	55.87	q
4	B	Anna Wessman	Sweden	55.47	x	x	55.47	q
5	A	Jenni Kangas	Finland	52.99	55.24	53.58	55.24	q
6	B	Heidi Nokelainen	Finland	55.11	x	x	55.11	q
7	A	Sara Jemai	Italy	52.55	51.03	54.95	54.95	q
8	B	Irena Šedivá	Czech Republic	54.71	53.79	52.43	54.71	q
9	A	Andrea Enerstad Bolle	Norway	53.23	53.03	50.71	53.23	q, PB
10	A	Rafaela Dias	Brazil	x	48.97	52.29	52.29	q
11	A	Yevgeniya Ananchenko	Russia	x	51.72	51.82	51.82	q
12	A	Victoria Peeters	New Zealand	51.75	x	x	51.75	q
13	B	Nicoleta-Madalina Anghelescu	Romania	51.59	51.28	51.48	51.59	
14	A	Marie Vestergaard	Denmark	46.03	49.13	51.33	51.33	PB
15	B	María Ríos	Chile	50.57	49.95	51.10	51.10	
16	A	Ai Yamauchi	Japan	47.51	50.59	47.59	50.59	
17	B	Anastasiya Svechnikova	Uzbekistan	x	50.47	x	50.47	
18	B	Mary Ramírez	Mexico	41.43	46.93	49.53	49.53	PB
19	B	Heo Hyo-jeong	South Korea	48.53	49.49	x	49.49	
20	A	Anikó Ormay	Hungary	48.98	47.60	47.20	48.98	
21	B	Kseniya Zybina	Russia	43.28	45.74	48.66	48.66	
22	B	Valentina Salazar	Chile	46.22	x	44.45	46.22	
23	A	Rosmary Lujan	Venezuela	46.01	44.53	45.80	46.01	
24	A	Hsu An-Yi	Chinese Taipei	42.72	44.78	43.93	44.78	
25	A	Wen Chia-Jung	Chinese Taipei	x	44.47	44.25	44.47	
26	B	Woo Wing Tung	Hong Kong	43.15	36.76	44.26	44.26	
26	B	Yohana Arias	Argentina	43.59	41.78	38.58	43.59	
27	A	Marte Aaltvedt	Norway	43.21	x	41.16	43.21	
28	B	Zaybree Haury	United States	34.86	41.49	42.17	42.17	

=== Final ===
Rank	Athlete	Nationality	#1	#2	#3	#4	#5	#6	Result	Notes
1st place, gold medalist(s)	Tatsiana Khaladovich	Belarus	59.97	59.28	57.68	x	60.45	59.21	60.45	
2nd place, silver medalist(s)	Līna Mūze	Latvia	54.66	56.21	60.26	54.70	59.20	59.61	60.26	
3rd place, bronze medalist(s)	Irena Šedivá	Czech Republic	59.89	55.05	58.81	53.75	57.29	54.97	59.89	PB
4	Anna Wessman	Sweden	58.34	52.59	55.50	55.23	–	–	58.34	PB
5	Du Xiaowei	China	53.28	54.93	x	51.79	51.85	55.63	55.63	
6	Victoria Peeters	New Zealand	51.66	55.00	51.89	51.84	50.65	x	55.00	
7	Andrea Enerstad Bolle	Norway	47.04	54.48	x	x	x	x	54.48	PB
8	Jenni Kangas	Finland	52.19	x	53.57	53.39	53.92	x	53.92	
9	Heidi Nokelainen	Finland	50.01	53.54	51.46				53.54	
10	Sara Jemai	Italy	52.67	x	50.82				52.67	
11	Yevgeniya Ananchenko	Russia	x	50.35	51.01				51.01	
12	Rafaela Dias	Brazil	50.02	x	49.20				50.02	
