= Jenni Kangas =

Finnish javelin thrower

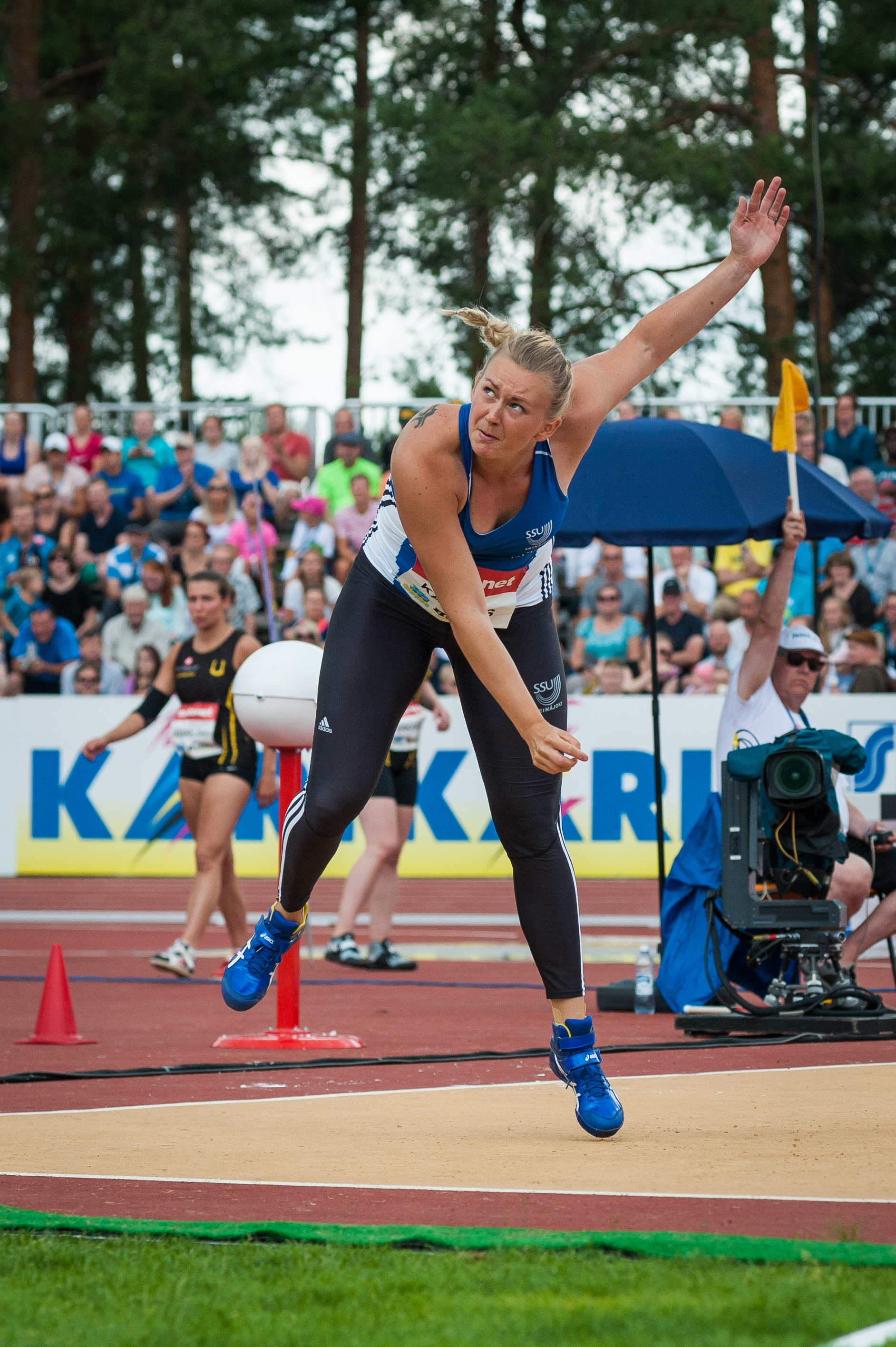

Personal information
- Full name: Jenni Pirita Susanna Kangas
- Nationality: Finnish
- Born: 3 July 1992 (age 33) Seinäjoki, Finland
- Height: 1.78 m (5 ft 10 in)
- Weight: 73 kg (161 lb)

Sport
- Country: Finland
- Sport: Track and field
- Event: Javelin throw

Achievements and titles
- Personal best: 60.98 m (2017)
Medal record
Women's athletics
Representing Finland
Summer Universiade
| Bronze medal – third place | 2017 Taipei | Javelin throw |

Jenni Pirita Susanna Kangas (born 3 July 1992) is a Finnish track and field athlete who competes in the javelin throw. In 2016, she finished ninth at the European Championships. In 2017, she won bronze at the Summer Universiade, throwing a personal best 60.98 m. She is coached by her father, retired javelin thrower Hannu Kangas.

== International competitions ==
| Year | Competition | Venue | Position | Event | Notes |
Representing Finland
| 2009 | World Youth Championships | Brixen, Italy | 18th (q) | Javelin throw | 45.00 m |
| 2009 | European Youth Olympic Festival | Tampere, Finland | 8th | Javelin throw | 44.95 m |
| 2011 | European Junior Championships | Tallinn, Estonia | 9th | Javelin throw | 50.93 m |
| 2013 | European U23 Championships | Tampere, Finland | 4th | Javelin throw | 54.11 m |
| 2015 | Universiade | Gwangju, South Korea | 8th | Javelin throw | 53.92 m |
| 2016 | European Championships | Amsterdam, Netherlands | 9th | Javelin throw | 59.41 m |
| 2017 | Universiade | Taipei, Taiwan | 3rd | Javelin throw | 60.98 m |
| 2018 | European Championships | Berlin, Germany | 12th | Javelin throw | 54.92 m |

== Personal bests ==
| Event | Record | Venue | Date |
|---|---|---|---|
| Javelin throw | 60.98 m | Taipei | 25 August 2017 |
