= 2013 European Athletics U23 Championships – Women's javelin throw =

The Women's javelin throw event at the 2013 European Athletics U23 Championships was held in Tampere, Finland, at Ratina Stadium on 13 and 14 July.

== Medalists ==
Gold	Līna Mūze; Latvia
Silver	Sarah Mayer; Germany
Bronze	Marija Vučenović; Serbia

== Results ==
=== Final ===
14 July 2013

Rank	Name	Nationality	Attempts						Result	Notes
Rank	Name	Nationality	1	2	3	4	5	6	Result	Notes
1st place, gold medalist(s)	Līna Mūze	Latvia	54.95	53.47	x	55.28	57.86	58.61	58.61	
2nd place, silver medalist(s)	Sarah Mayer	Germany	44.80	53.66	51.67	52.86	54.87	55.43	55.43	
3rd place, bronze medalist(s)	Marija Vučenović	Serbia	43.69	x	53.32	x	x	54.43	54.43	
4	Jenni Kangas	Finland	54.11	44.92	48.17	52.31	51.11	51.80	54.11	
5	Desirée Schwarz	Germany	52.04	52.67	51.03	50.53	51.11	53.72	53.72	
6	Sanni Utriainen	Finland	53.29	53.25	53.52	53.59	52.36	51.78	53.59	
7	Gundega Grīva	Latvia	x	49.47	51.31	52.39	x	53.23	53.23	
8	Piia Pyykkinen	Finland	48.29	49.78	51.74	49.58	48.84	x	51.74	
9	Sara Jemai	Italy	50.65	49.54	50.01				50.65	
10	Hanna Habina	Ukraine	x	49.80	49.24				49.80	
11	Lidia Parada	Spain	48.30	x	47.95				48.30	
12	Nina Otto	Denmark	45.99	44.61	46.79				46.79	

=== Qualifications ===
Qualified: qualifying perf. 55.50 (Q) or 12 best performers (q) advance to the Final

==== Summary ====
Rank	Name	Nationality	Result	Notes
1	Līna Mūze	Latvia	57.04	Q
2	Sarah Mayer	Germany	56.39	Q
3	Hanna Habina	Ukraine	54.71	q
4	Jenni Kangas	Finland	54.66	q
5	Lidia Parada	Spain	54.52	q PB
6	Gundega Grīva	Latvia	54.35	q
7	Sanni Utriainen	Finland	54.03	q
8	Piia Pyykkinen	Finland	53.61	q
9	Sara Jemai	Italy	53.54	q
10	Nina Otto	Denmark	53.14	q PB
11	Desirée Schwarz	Germany	52.69	q
12	Marija Vučenović	Serbia	52.52	q
13	Izzy Jeffs	United Kingdom	51.88	
14	Kateryna Derun	Ukraine	51.53	
15	Marta Kąkol	Poland	51.49	
16	Nicoleta Madalina Anghelescu	Romania	49.86	
17	Karolina Bołdysz	Poland	49.49	
18	Anikó Ormay	Hungary	49.29	
19	Matilda Elfgaard	Sweden	49.13	
20	Elisabete Silva	Portugal	48.71	
21	Irena Šedivá	Czech Republic	48.58	
22	Andrea Enerstad Bolle	Norway	48.31	
23	Linda Treiel	Estonia	47.27	
24	Petra Andrejskova	Czech Republic	46.23	
25	Giedrė Kupstytė	Lithuania	46.14	
26	Berivan Şakır	Turkey	44.58	
	Tatsiana Khaladovich	Belarus	NM	

==== Details ====
===== Group A =====
13 July 2013 / 10:00

Rank	Name	Nationality	Attempts			Result	Notes
Rank	Name	Nationality	1	2	3	Result	Notes
1	Līna Mūze	Latvia	57.04			57.04	Q
2	Sarah Mayer	Germany	56.39			56.39	Q
3	Jenni Kangas	Finland	54.14	54.66	-	54.66	q
4	Sanni Utriainen	Finland	46.73	x	54.03	54.03	q
5	Nina Otto	Denmark	53.14	x	x	53.14	q PB
6	Kateryna Derun	Ukraine	x	51.53	50.44	51.53	
7	Marta Kąkol	Poland	45.99	50.38	51.49	51.49	
8	Nicoleta Madalina Anghelescu	Romania	49.86	49.78	49.63	49.86	
9	Elisabete Silva	Portugal	47.30	48.71	47.63	48.71	
10	Andrea Enerstad Bolle	Norway	43.65	44.41	48.31	48.31	
11	Petra Andrejskova	Czech Republic	45.00	46.23	44.10	46.23	
12	Giedrė Kupstytė	Lithuania	40.98	46.14	40.62	46.14	
13	Berivan Şakır	Turkey	42.90	43.50	44.58	44.58	
	Tatsiana Khaladovich	Belarus	x	x	x	NM	

===== Group B =====
13 July 2013 / 11:10

Rank	Name	Nationality	Attempts			Result	Notes
Rank	Name	Nationality	1	2	3	Result	Notes
1	Hanna Habina	Ukraine	48.66	x	54.71	54.71	q
2	Lidia Parada	Spain	54.52	52.35	-	54.52	q PB
3	Gundega Grīva	Latvia	54.35	-	-	54.35	q
4	Piia Pyykkinen	Finland	46.52	50.78	53.61	53.61	q
5	Sara Jemai	Italy	47.68	53.54	49.42	53.54	q
6	Desirée Schwarz	Germany	52.69	x	49.76	52.69	q
7	Marija Vučenović	Serbia	52.52	x	x	52.52	q
8	Izzy Jeffs	United Kingdom	49.52	51.52	51.88	51.88	
9	Karolina Bołdysz	Poland	47.38	49.49	49.43	49.49	
10	Anikó Ormay	Hungary	49.29	47.04	46.72	49.29	
11	Matilda Elfgaard	Sweden	x	x	49.13	49.13	
12	Irena Šedivá	Czech Republic	x	48.58	44.30	48.58	
13	Linda Treiel	Estonia	46.39	44.66	47.27	47.27	

== Participation ==
According to an unofficial count, 27 athletes from 20 countries participated in the event.

- Belarus (1)
- Czech Republic (2)
- Denmark (1)
- Estonia (1)
- Finland (3)
- Germany (2)
- Hungary (1)
- Italy (1)
- Latvia (2)
- Lithuania (1)
- Norway (1)
- Poland (2)
- Portugal (1)
- Romania (1)
- Serbia (1)
- Spain (1)
- Sweden (1)
- Turkey (1)
- Ukraine (2)
- United Kingdom (1)
