= Lidia Parada =

Spanish javelin thrower

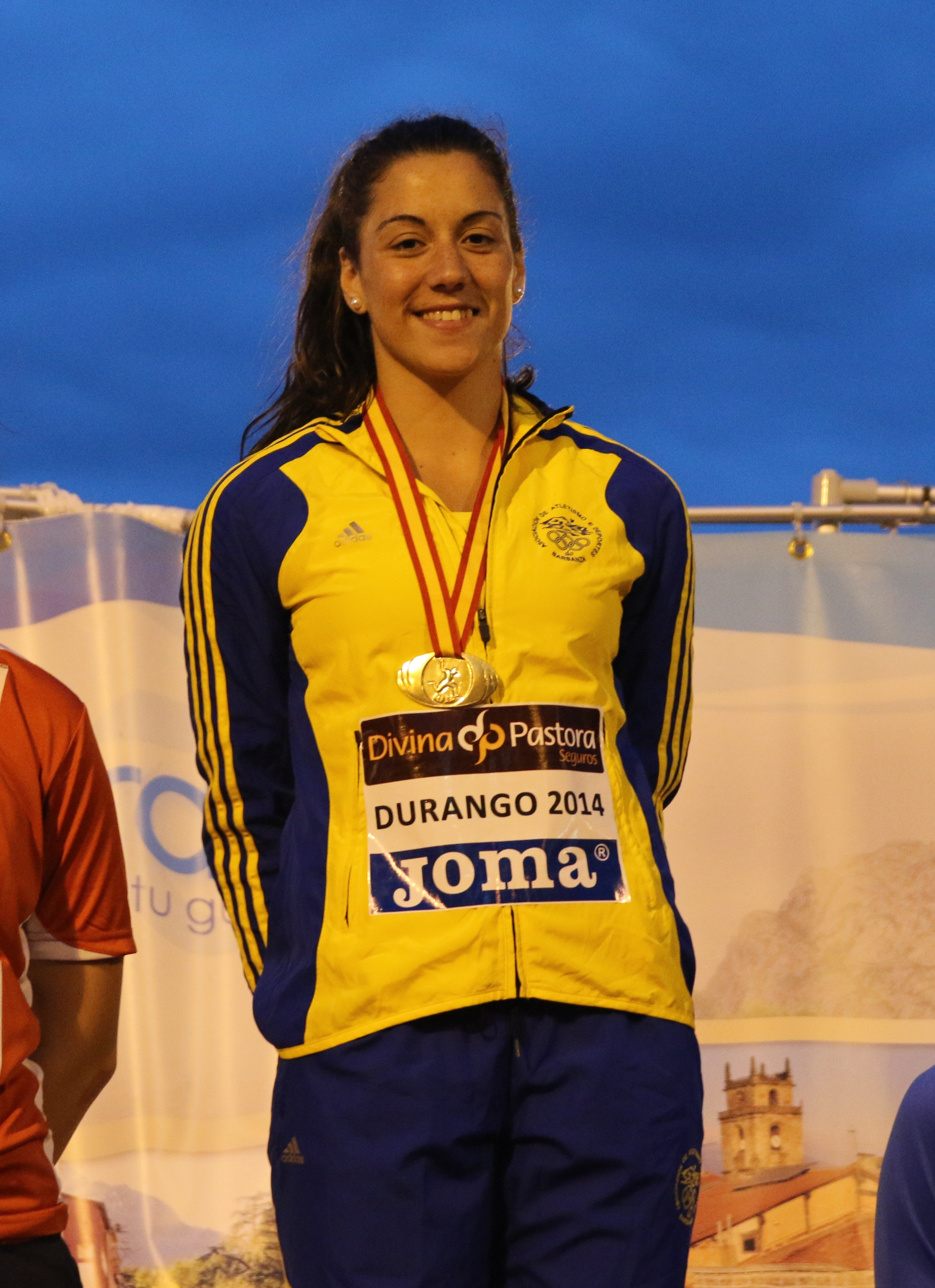
- Lidia Parada in 2014

Personal information
- Full name: Lidia Parada Santos
- Born: 11 June 1993 (age 33) Puebla del Caramiñal, Spain
- Height: 1.74 m (5 ft 9 in)
- Weight: 70 kg (154 lb)

Sport
- Sport: Athletics
- Event: Javelin throw
- Club: Atlética Barbanza
- Coached by: Abelardo Moure

Lidia Parada Santos (born 11 June 1993) is a Spanish athlete specialising in the javelin throw. She represented her country at two European Championships without qualifying for the final.

Her personal best in the event is 61.25 metres set in Getafe in 2018.

== International competitions ==
| Year | Competition | Venue | Position | Event | Notes |
Representing Spain
| 2009 | World Youth Championships | Brixen, Italy | 37th (q) | Javelin throw | 37.57 m |
| 2012 | World Junior Championships | Barcelona, Spain | 15th (q) | Javelin throw | 50.33 m |
| 2013 | European U23 Championships | Tampere, Finland | 11th | Javelin throw | 48.30 m |
| 2014 | Mediterranean U23 Championships | Aubagne, France | 5th | Javelin throw | 49.11 m |
| 2014 | Ibero-American Championships | São Paulo, Brazil | 5th | Javelin throw | 52.07 m |
| 2015 | European U23 Championships | Tallinn, Estonia | 6th | Javelin throw | 54.09 m |
| 2016 | European Championships | Amsterdam, Netherlands | 15th (q) | Javelin throw | 57.34 m |
| 2018 | European Championships | Berlin, Germany | 14th (q) | Javelin throw | 58.08 m |
| 2018 | Ibero-American Championships | Trujillo, Peru | 5th | Javelin throw | 51.00 m |
| 2019 | European Games | Minsk, Belarus | 14th | Javelin throw | 52.17 m |
| 2019 | European Games | Minsk, Belarus | TBD | DNA Athletics | TBD |
