= Kateryna Derun =

Ukrainian javelin thrower (born 1993)

Personal information
- Native name: Катерина Олександрівна Дерун
- Full name: Kateryna Oleksandrivna Derun
- Born: 24 September 1993 (age 32)

Sport
- Country: Ukraine
- Sport: Track and field
- Event: Javelin throw
- Updated on 29 August 2015

Kateryna Oleksandrivna Derun (Ukrainian: Катерина Олександрівна Дерун; born 24 September 1993) is a Ukrainian athlete specialising in the javelin throw.

== Career ==
She is the winner of the 2010 Youth Olympic Games in Singapore. Silver Medalist at the European Championship U23 2015. Silver Medalist at Universiade Qatar 2009, Bronze Medalist at the European Throwing Cup Bar 2013.

She competed at the 2015 World Championships in Beijing without qualifying for the final. In addition, she won the silver at the 2015 European U23 Championships. 2nd result in the Ukrainian javelin throw history at the Olympic Games.

Olympian in Rio-De-Janeiro 2016 where the record was made.

Her personal best in the event is 62.82 metres set in Kyiv on 5 May 2016.

== Competition record ==
Year	Competition	Venue	Position	Event	Notes
Representing Ukraine
2009	World Youth Championships	Brixen, Italy	14th (q)	Javelin throw	45.63 m
2009	European Youth Olympic Festival	Tampere, Finland	5th	Javelin throw	46.52 m
2010	Youth Olympic Games	Singapore	1st	Javelin throw	54.59 m
2011	European Junior Championships	Tallinn, Estonia	12th	Javelin throw	49.03 m
2012	World Junior Championships	Barcelona, Spain	21st (q)	Javelin throw	48.69 m
2013	European U23 Championships	Tampere, Finland	14th (q)	Javelin throw	51.53 m
2015	European U23 Championships	Tallinn, Estonia	2nd	Javelin throw	58.60 m
2015	World Championships	Beijing, China	32nd (q)	Javelin throw	53.49 m
2016	European Championships	Amsterdam, Netherlands	27th (q)	Javelin throw	52.92 m
2016	Olympic Games	Rio de Janeiro, Brazil	17th (q)	Javelin throw	60.02 m
