= Irena Gillarová =

Czech javelin thrower

Personal information
- Born: Irena Šedivá; 19 January 1992 (age 34) Příbram, Czech Republic
- Education: Virginia Tech

Sport
- Sport: Athletics
- Event: Javelin throw
- Club: TJ Sokol Kolín; TJ Dukla Praha

Irena Gillarová (born Irena Šedivá, 19 January 1992) is a Czech former athlete specialising in the javelin throw. She won a bronze medal at the 2015 Summer Universiade.

Her personal best in the event is 61.32 metres set in Bydgoszcz in August 2019.

She has studied at Virginia Tech. Where she has become NCAA Champion in 2015 and 2017.

In January 2020, she changed her surname due to marriage of her parents.

Gillarová retired in January 2025.

== International competitions ==
| Year | Competition | Venue | Position | Event | Notes |
Representing the Czech Republic
| 2009 | World Youth Championships | Brixen, Italy | 16th (q) | Javelin throw | 45.62 m |
| 2009 | European Youth Olympic Festival | Tampere, Finland | 7th | Javelin throw | 45.70 m |
| 2011 | European Junior Championships | Tallinn, Estonia | 6th | Javelin throw | 53.02 m |
| 2013 | European U23 Championships | Tampere, Finland | 21st (q) | Javelin throw | 48.58 m |
| 2015 | Universiade | Gwangju, South Korea | 3rd | Javelin throw | 59.89 m |
| 2016 | European Championships | Amsterdam, Netherlands | 29th (q) | Javelin throw | 52.48 m |
| 2017 | Universiade | Taipei, Taiwan | 11th | Javelin throw | 56.24 m |
| 2018 | European Championships | Berlin, Germany | 7th | Javelin throw | 59.76 m |
| 2019 | World Championships | Doha, Qatar | 12th | Javelin throw | 55.86 m |
| 2021 | Olympic Games | Tokyo, Japan | 19th (q) | Javelin throw | 59.16 m |
| 2023 | World Championships | Budapest, Hungary | 32nd (q) | Javelin throw | 54.15 m |
