= Athletics at the 2010 Summer Youth Olympics – Girls' javelin throw =

Athletics – girls' javelin throw at the I Summer Youth Olympic Games
- Venue: Bishan Stadium
- Date: August 18–22
- Competitors: 15 from 15 nations

Medalists
1st place, gold medalist(s)		Kateryna Derun	Ukraine
2nd place, silver medalist(s)		Lismania Muñoz	Cuba
3rd place, bronze medalist(s)		Hannah Carson	United States

The girls' javelin throw event at the 2010 Youth Olympic Games was held on 18–22 August 2010 in Bishan Stadium.

== Schedule ==
Date	Time	Round
18 August 2010	10:50	Qualification
22 August 2010	10:10	Final

== Results ==
=== Qualification ===
Rank	Athlete	1	2	3	4	Result	Notes	Q
1	Lismania Muñoz (CUB)	51.99	-	-	46.21	51.99		FA
2	Christin Hussong (GER)	45.23	45.49	49.96	43.25	49.96		FA
3	Eva Vivod (SLO)	47.45	45.16	45.62	49.49	49.49		FA
4	Nathalie Meier (SUI)	45.80	44.06	46.10	49.43	49.43		FA
5	Hannah Carson (USA)	43.10	48.44	48.64	x	48.64		FA
6	Kateryna Derun (UKR)	x	48.32	x	45.28	48.32		FA
7	Freya Jones (GBR)	43.04	48.24	45.01	46.83	48.24		FA
8	Daliadiz Ortiz (PUR)	45.26	x	x	44.14	45.26		FA
9	Roberta Molardi (ITA)	41.87	39.35	43.44	39.95	43.44		FB
10	Tsukasa Okumura (JPN)	42.62	x	42.06	42.47	42.62		FB
11	Noémie Pleimling (LUX)	39.60	42.22	42.20	41.07	42.22		FB
12	Peng Juanhong (CHN)	34.24	40.77	x	37.57	40.77		FB
13	Chia-Jung Wen (TPE)	40.15	38.52	35.89	40.64	40.64		FB
14	Noha Afifi (EGY)	x	38.35	37.14	38.17	38.35		FB
15	Ameni Ben Salem (TUN)	35.44	x	34.23	32.77	35.44		FB

=== Finals ===
==== Final B ====
Rank	Athlete	1	2	3	4	Result	Notes
1	Tsukasa Okumura (JPN)	41.87	46.24	44.09	45.17	46.24	SB
2	Noémie Pleimling (LUX)	40.84	46.20	45.64	43.42	46.20	
3	Chia-Jung Wen (TPE)	42.27	44.61	43.35	44.96	44.96	
4	Peng Juanhong (CHN)	41.67	44.53	43.11	41.13	44.53	
5	Roberta Molardi (ITA)	40.90	x	42.52	43.90	43.90	
6	Noha Afifi (EGY)	37.74	35.48	37.99	38.92	38.92	
7	Ameni Ben Salem (TUN)	36.46	33.44	31.76	32.84	36.46	

==== Final A ====
Rank	Athlete	1	2	3	4	Result	Notes
1st place, gold medalist(s)	Kateryna Derun (UKR)	48.76	50.68	50.91	54.59	54.59	PB
2nd place, silver medalist(s)	Lismania Muñoz (CUB)	52.40	51.31	50.67	51.46	52.40	
3rd place, bronze medalist(s)	Hannah Carson (USA)	42.31	48.85	46.90	50.64	50.64	
4	Christin Hussong (GER)	43.27	47.54	47.70	49.89	49.89	
5	Freya Jones (GBR)	45.59	47.61	49.56	x	49.56	
6	Daliadiz Ortiz (PUR)	41.45	49.10	46.96	48.32	49.10	PB
7	Nathalie Meier (SUI)	48.61	45.55	47.24	43.70	48.61	
8	Eva Vivod (SLO)	44.73	46.70	42.19	42.61	46.70	
