= Līna Mūze =

Latvian javelin thrower (born 1992)

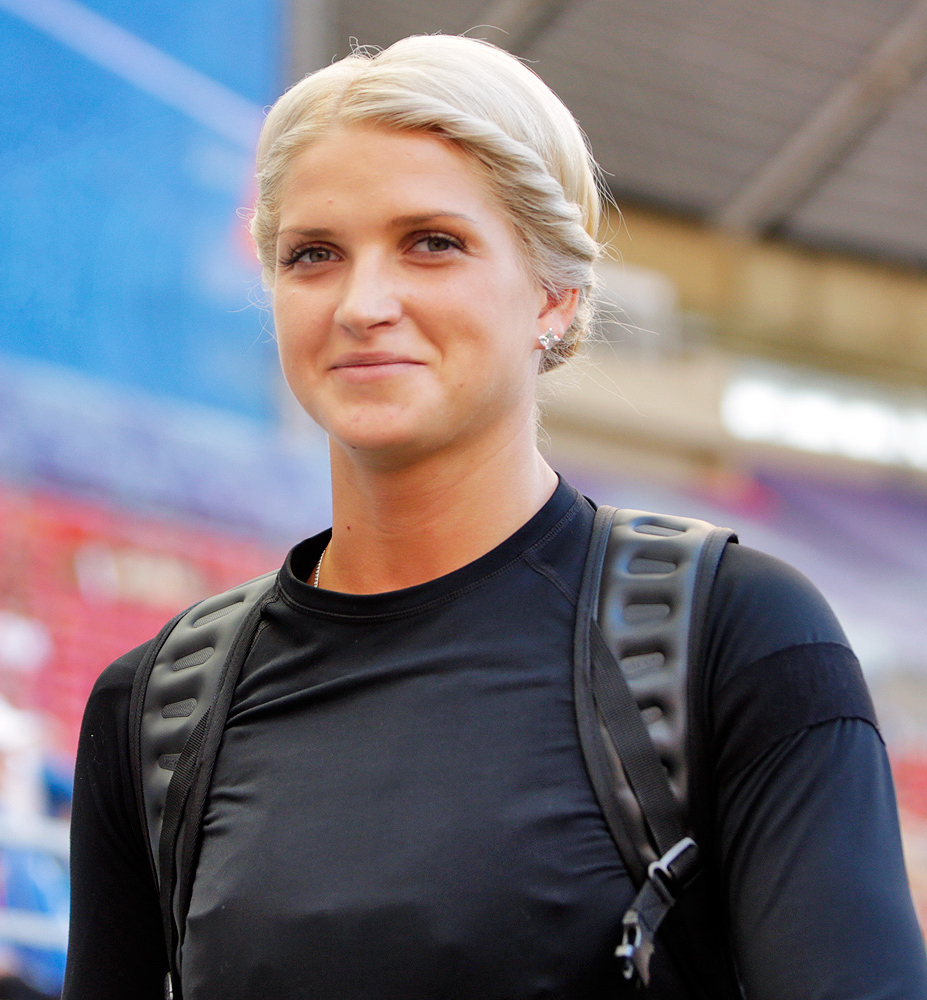
- Mūze at 2013 World Championships in Athletics

Personal information
- Born: 4 December 1992 (age 33) Smiltene, Latvia
- Height: 1.82 m (6 ft 0 in)
- Weight: 75 kg (165 lb)

Sport
- Country: Latvia
- Sport: Track and field
- Event: Javelin throw

Achievements and titles
- Personal best: 64.87 m (2019)
Medal record
Women's athletics
Representing Latvia
European Games
Gold medal – first place	2023 Kraków–Małopolska	Javelin throw
European U23 Championships
Gold medal – first place	2013 Tampere	Javelin throw
World Junior Championships
Silver medal – second place	2010 Moncton	Javelin throw
European Junior Championships
Silver medal – second place	2011 Tallinn	Javelin throw

Līna Mūze (born 4 December 1992) is a Latvian track and field athlete who competes in the javelin throw. She is a European Games champion and won the gold medal in the javelin event at the 2023 Championships. Mūze is also a European U23 champion, and a World Junior Championships and European Junior Championships silver medallist. She is a three-time Olympian and competed at the 2012, 2020 and 2024 Olympic Games. Her personal best throw is 64.87 m, set in 2019.

== Career ==
Mūze won her first international medal when she placed second at the 2010 World Junior Championships in Moncton. On 2 June 2011, she set a Latvian junior record of 60.64 m. She won a second junior level silver medal at the 2011 European Junior Championships in Tallinn. Mūze made her Olympic Games debut the 2012 Summer Olympics in London, where she placed 13th in the women's javelin throw event qualification. She won the gold medal at the 2013 European U23 Championships in Tampere and competed at her first World Championships that same year. She made her European Championships debut at the 2014 championships in Zurich and won the silver medal in the javelin throw event at the 2015 Summer Universiade.

At the 2016 European Championships, Mūze suffered an injury in her first attempt in the qualification. Following her injury, she made a return to international competitions at the 2018 European Championships. Mūze competed in the women's javelin throw event at the 2020 Summer Olympics in Tokyo. In 2022, she placed sixth at the World Championships in Eugene and seventh at the European Championships in Munich. Mūze finished ninth at the 2023 World Championships in Budapest and eight at the 2024 European Championships in Rome. She competed in the women's javelin throw event at the 2024 Summer Olympics in Paris.

== Achievements ==
Year	Competition	Venue	Position	Notes
Representing Latvia
2009	World Youth Championships	Brixen, Italy	6th	50.36 m
2010	World Junior Championships	Moncton, Canada	2nd	56.64 m
2011	European Junior Championships	Tallinn, Estonia	2nd	55.83 m
2012	Olympic Games	London, United Kingdom	13th (q)	59.91 m
2013	European U23 Championships	Tampere, Finland	1st	58.61 m
2013	World Championships	Moscow, Russia	14th (q)	60.29 m
2014	European Championships	Zürich, Switzerland	19th (q)	53.42 m
2015	Universiade	Gwangju, South Korea	2nd	60.26 m
2016	European Championships	Amsterdam, Netherlands	–	NM
2018	European Championships	Berlin, Germany	19th (q)	53.95 m
2019	World Championships	Doha, Qatar	27th (q)	55.66 m
2021	Olympic Games	Tokyo, Japan	26th (q)	57.33 m
2022	World Championships	Eugene, United States	6th	61.26 m
2022	European Championships	Munich, Germany	7th	58.11 m
2023	World Championships	Budapest, Hungary	9th	58.43 m
2024	European Championships	Rome, Italy	8th	58.58 m
2024	Olympic Games	Paris, France	17th (q)	60.30 m
