= Tatsiana Khaladovich =

Belarusian javelin thrower

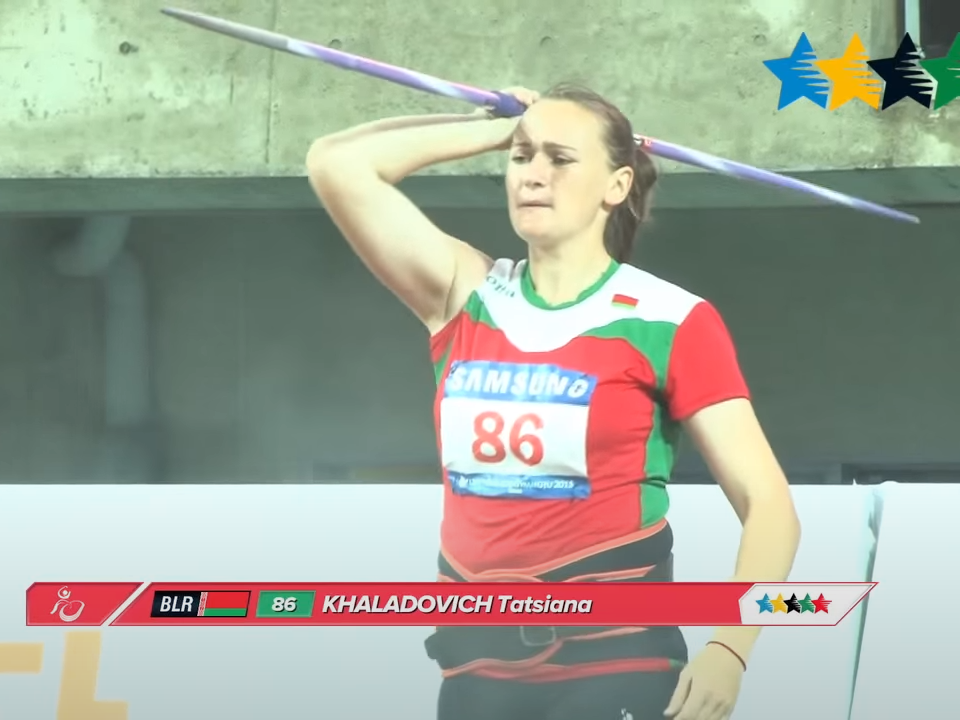
- Tatsiana Khaladovich before her gold attempt at the 2015 Summer Universiade in Gwangju

Personal information
- Born: 21 June 1991 (age 35) Pinsk, Brest Region, Byelorussian SSR, Soviet Union
- Education: A.S. Pushkin Brest State University
- Height: 1.81 m (5 ft 11 in)
- Weight: 81 kg (179 lb)

Sport
- Country: Belarus
- Sport: Track and field
- Event: Javelin throw

Achievements and titles
- Personal bests: NR 67.47 m (2018)
Medal record
European Championships
| Gold medal – first place | 2016 Amsterdam | Javelin throw |
Universiade
| Gold medal – first place | 2015 Gwangju | Javelin throw |

Tatsiana Uladzimirauna Khaladovich (Belarusian: Таццяна Уладзіміраўна Халадовіч; Łacinka: Tacciana Chaładovič; born 21 June 1991) is a Belarusian track and field athlete who competes in the javelin throw. She won gold at the 2016 European Championships, where she set a personal best and Belarusian record of 66.34 m.

== Career ==
Khaladovich finished fifth at the 2014 European Championships in Zürich. She won the gold medal at the 2015 Summer Universiade in Gwangju. At the 2016 European Championships in Amsterdam, she won the gold medal with a personal best, 66.34 metres. She placed fifth at the 2016 Summer Olympics in Rio de Janeiro.

In 2019, she won the silver medal in the team event at the 2019 European Games held in Minsk, Belarus.

== Competition record ==
| Year | Competition | Venue | Position | Event | Notes |
Representing Belarus
| 2008 | World Junior Championships | Bydgoszcz, Poland | 16th (q) | Javelin throw | 48.33 m |
| 2010 | World Junior Championships | Moncton, Canada | 21st (q) | Javelin throw | 45.99 m |
| 2013 | European U23 Championships | Tampere, Finland | – | Javelin throw | NM |
| 2014 | European Championships | Zürich, Switzerland | 5th | Javelin throw | 61.66 m |
| 2015 | Universiade | Gwangju, South Korea | 1st | Javelin throw | 60.45 m |
| 2015 | World Championships | Beijing, China | 21st (q) | Javelin throw | 60.07 m |
| 2016 | European Championships | Amsterdam, Netherlands | 1st | Javelin throw | 66.34 m |
| 2016 | Olympic Games | Rio de Janeiro, Brazil | 5th | Javelin throw | 64.60 m |
| 2017 | World Championships | London, United Kingdom | 6th | Javelin throw | 64.05 m |
| 2018 | European Championships | Berlin, Germany | 5th | Javelin throw | 60.92 m |
| 2019 | World Championships | Doha, Qatar | 6th | Javelin throw | 62.54 m |
| 2021 | Olympic Games | Tokyo, Japan | 13th (q) | Javelin throw | 60.78 m |
