= Sara Jemai =

Italian javelin thrower (born 2002)

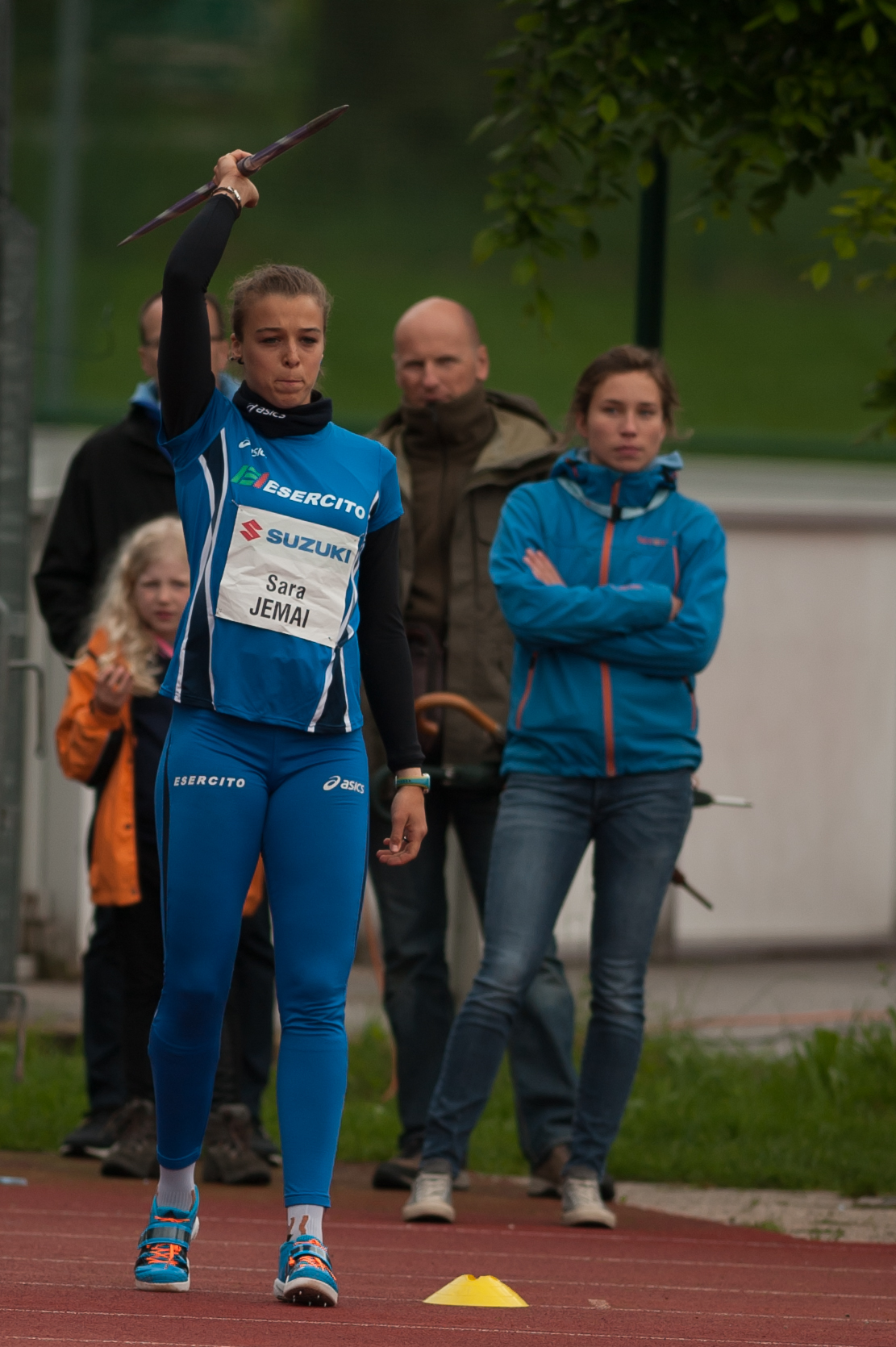
- Sara Jemai at the 2015 Salzburger Leichtathletik Gala

Personal information
- National team: Italy
- Born: 12 April 1992 (age 34) Gavardo, Italy
- Height: 1.78 m (5 ft 10 in)
- Weight: 65 kg (143 lb)

Sport
- Sport: Athletics
- Event: Javelin throw
- Club: G.S. Esercito
- Coached by: Carlo Giulioni

Achievements and titles
- Personal bests: Javelin throw: 58.19 m (2018); Heptathlon: 5017 pts (2013)
Medal record
Representing Italy
Women's athletics
Mediterranean U23 Championships
Bronze medal – third place	2014 Aubagne	Javelin throw

Sara Jemai (born 12 April 2002) is an Italian female javelin thrower, born in Italy from Tunisian father.

== Biography ==
She has now devoted herself exclusively to the javelin throw, as a youngster she also competed in the heptathlon, to the point of being able to win an Italian under 23 title in 2013.

== Personal bests ==
- Javelin throw: 58.19 m - (Italy) Pescara, 9 September 2018

== Achievements ==
Year	Competition	Venue	Position	Event	Measure	Notes
2013	European U23 Championships	(Finland) Tampere	9th	Javelin throw	50.65 m	
2014	Mediterranean U23 Championships	(France) Aubagne	3rd	Javelin throw	51.57 m	
2015	Summer Universiade	(South Korea) Gwangju	10th	Javelin throw	52.67 m	
2021	European Throwing Cup	(Croatia) Split	12th	Javelin throw	56.21 m	SB

== National titles ==
Jemai won nine times the national championship.

- Italian Athletics Championships
  - Javelin throw: 2013, 2014, 2015, 2018 (4)
- Italian Winter Throwing Championships
  - Javelin throw: 2014, 2016, 2018, 2019, 2021 (5)

== See also ==
- Italian all-time lists - Javelin throw
