= Tatsiana Korzh =

Belarusian javelin thrower

Personal information
- Born: 17 March 1993 (age 32)
- Height: 1.75 m (5 ft 9 in)
- Weight: 75 kg (165 lb)

Sport
- Sport: Athletics
- Event: Javelin throw

Tatsiana Korzh (Belarusian: Тацяна Корж; born 17 March 1993) is a Belarusian athlete specialising in the javelin throw. She represented her country at the 2016 Summer Olympics without qualifying for the final.

Her personal best in the event is 62.10 metres set in Minsk in 2016.

== International competitions ==
| Year | Competition | Venue | Position | Event | Notes |
Representing Belarus
| 2015 | European U23 Championships | Tallinn, Estonia | 8th | Javelin throw | 52.54 m |
| 2016 | Olympic Games | Rio de Janeiro, Brazil | 26th (q) | Javelin throw | 56.16 m |
