= Friederike Möhlenkamp =

German sprinter (born 1992)

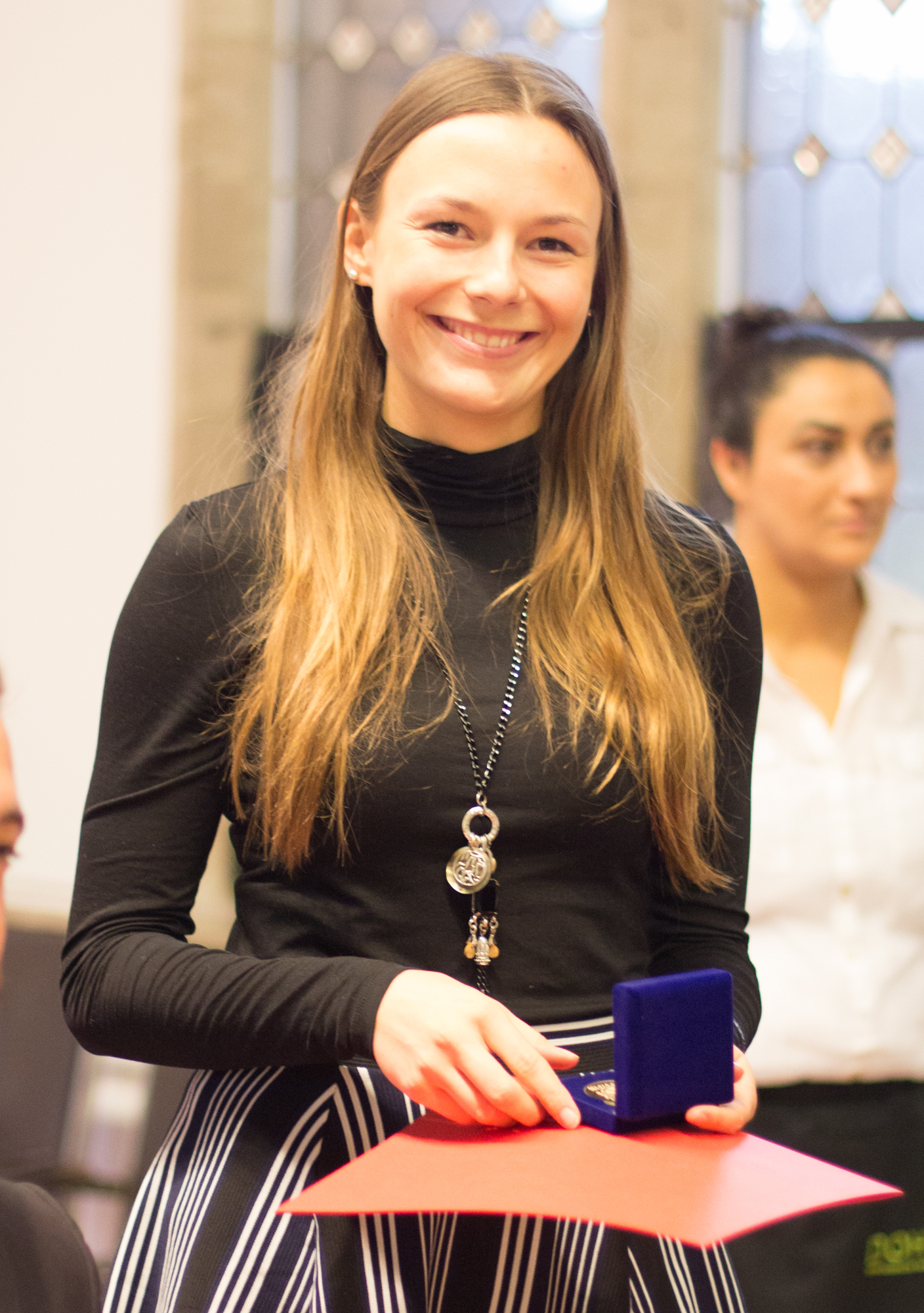
- Friederike Möhlenkamp 2016

Personal information
- Nationality: German
- Born: 19 November 1992 (age 33) Greven, Germany
- Height: 1.76 m (5 ft 9 in)
- Weight: 63 kg (139 lb)

Sport
- Country: Germany
- Sport: Track and field
- Event: 4 × 400 metres relay

Friederike Möhlenkamp (born 19 November 1992) is a German sprinter. She competed in the 4 × 400 metres relay at the 2016 European Athletics Championships and in the 4 x 400 metres relay at the 2016 Summer Olympics.

== Early life ==
Möhlenkamp was born in Greven. She attended Gymnasium Martinum in Emsdetten, where she completed her abitur in 2012.
