= Liina Laasma =

Estonian javelin thrower (born 1992)

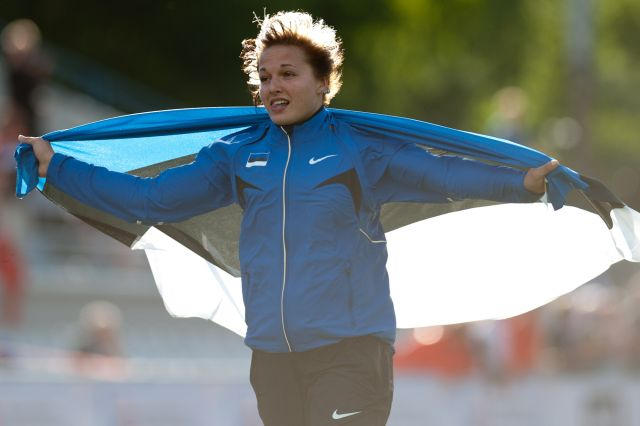
- Liina Laasma in 2011

Personal information
- Born: 13 January 1992 (age 34) Tõstamaa, Estonia

Sport
- Sport: Athletics
- Event: Javelin throw
- Club: SK Saarde

Achievements and titles
- Personal best: 63.65 m

Liina Laasma (born 13 January 1992) is an Estonian athlete specialising in the javelin throw. She represented her country at the 2013 World Championships without qualifying for the final. In addition, she won the gold medal at the 2011 European Junior Championships on home soil.

Her personal best in the event is 63.65 metres set in Rabat in 2016. This is the current national record.

== Competition record ==
Year	Competition	Venue	Position	Event	Result
Representing Estonia
2009	World Youth Championships	Brixen, Italy	5th	Javelin throw	50.99 m
2009	European Youth Olympic Festival	Tampere, Finland	1st	Javelin throw	53.66 m
2010	World Junior Championships	Moncton, Canada	14th (q)	Javelin throw	48.22 m
2011	European Junior Championships	Tallinn, Estonia	1st	Javelin throw	55.99 m
2013	World Championships	Moscow, Russia	24th (q)	Javelin throw	56.93 m
2016	European Championships	Amsterdam, Netherlands	18th (q)	Javelin throw	56.61 m
2016	Olympic Games	Rio de Janeiro, Brazil	20th (q)	Javelin throw	58.06 m
2018	European Championships	Berlin, Germany	–	Javelin throw	NM
