= Marija Vučenović =

Serbian javelin thrower

Personal information
- Nationality: Serbian
- Born: 3 April 1993 (age 33) Sremska Mitrovica
- Education: University of Florida

Sport
- Country: Serbia
- Sport: Athletics
- Event: Javelin throw
- College team: Florida Gators
- Club: AK Vojvodina

Achievements and titles
- Personal best: 62.25 m (Split 2021)
Medal record
Women's athletics
Representing Serbia
European U23 Championships
Bronze medal – third place	2013 Tampere	Javelin throw
World U20 Championships
Bronze medal – third place	2012 Barcelona	Javelin throw

Marija Vučenović (Serbian Cyrillic:Марија Вученовић, born 3 April 1993) is a Serbian athlete specialising in the javelin throw. She won bronze medals at the 2012 World Under-20 Championships and 2013 European U23 Championships.

== Career ==
As a junior, Vučenović won bronze at the World Junior Championships in Barcelona, throwing a personal best of 57.12 metres, over two metres further than her previous best. The following year, Vučenović competed at the 2013 European Athletics U23 Championships in Tampere, Finland, where she won another bronze medal in the javelin throw after throwing 54.53 metres.

At the 2018 European Athletics Championships in Berlin, Vučenović reached the women's javelin final, where she finished 11th after recording a best mark of 55.23 metres.

In May 2021 Vučenović recorded her personal best in the javelin, 62.25 metres set in Split. In July 2021, the Olympic Committee of Serbia announced that Vučenović would be part of the Serbia delegation at the 2020 Summer Olympics. She failed to reach the final of the women's javelin throw after finishing ninth in her qualifying group and 20th overall.

At the 2023 World Athletics Championships in Budapest, Vučenović threw the javelin 54.21 metres, which placed her 31st in the qualifying stage and was short of the qualifying distance of 61.50 metres needed to advance to the final. Vučenović competed in the 2024 European Athletics Championships in Rome, reaching the javelin final after making her season's best of 59.90 metres to place sixth in the heats.
