= List of Universiade medalists in athletics (women) =

This is the complete list of women's Universiade medalists in athletics from 1959 to 2019.

== Events ==
=== 100m ===
Games	Gold		Silver		Bronze	
1959	Giuseppina Leone (ITA)	11.7	Lyudmila Nechayeva (URS)	12.0	Catherine Capdevielle (FRA)	12.1
1961	Tatyana Shchelkanova (URS)	11.78	Galina Popova (URS)	11.90	Joan Atkinson (GBR)	11.93
1963	Renāte Lāce (URS)	11.91	Vera Popkova (URS)	12.02	Miguelina Cobián (CUB)	12.11
1965	Irena Kirszenstein (POL)	11.3	Miguelina Cobián (CUB)	11.5	Liz Gill (GBR)	11.6
1967	Barbara Ferrell (USA)	11.6	Gabrielle Meyer (FRA)	11.7	Gerlind Beyrichen (FRG)	12.1
1970	Renate Meißner (GDR)	11.5	Wilma van den Berg (NED)	11.6	Györgyi Balogh (HUN)	11.7
1973	Mona-Lisa Pursiainen (FIN)	11.41	Elfgard Schittenhelm (FRG)	11.62	Ellen Stropahl (GDR)	11.63
1975	Lyudmila Zharkova (URS)	11.31	Mona-Lisa Pursiainen (FIN)	11.47	Patty Loverock (CAN)	11.57
1977	Lyudmila Storozhkova (URS)	11.21	Andrea Lynch (GBR)	11.22	Silvia Chivás (CUB)	11.23
1979	Marlies Göhr (GDR)	11.00 UR	Kathy Smallwood (GBR)	11.27	Beverley Goddard (GBR)	11.32
1981	Bev Goddard (GBR)	11.35	Olga Zolotaryova (URS)	11.51	Olga Nasonova (URS)	11.54
1983	Beverly Kinch (GBR)	11.13w	Randy Givens (USA)	11.16w	Angella Taylor (CAN)	11.17w
1985	Irina Slyusar (URS)	11.22	Anelia Nuneva (BUL)	11.29	Grace Jackson (JAM)	11.35
1987	Gwen Torrence (USA)	11.09	Irina Slyusar (URS)	11.34	Tina Iheagwam (NGR)	11.40
1989	Liliana Allen (CUB)	11.37	Anita Howard (USA)	11.47	Natalya Voronova (URS)	11.48
1991	Chryste Gaines (USA)	11.56	Anita Howard (USA)	11.57	Sølvi Olsen (NOR)	11.61
1993	Dahlia Duhaney (JAM)	11.56	Liliana Allen (CUB)	11.57	Beatrice Utondu (NGR)	11.59
1995	Melanie Paschke (GER)	11.16	Ekaterini Thanou (GRE)	11.30	Mary Tombiri (NGR)	11.43
1997	Ekaterini Thanou (GRE)	11.20	Anzhela Kravchenko (UKR)	11.34	Katia Benth (FRA)	11.35
1999	Angela Williams (USA)	11.19	Katia Benth (FRA)	11.23	Virgen Benavides (CUB)	11.25
2001	Abi Oyepitan (GBR)	11.42	Zeng Xiujun (CHN)	11.58	Mireille Donders (SUI)	11.59
2003	Qin Wangping; China	11.53	Enikő Szabó; Hungary	11.61	Yelena Bolsun; Russia	11.65
2005	Olga Khalandyreva; Russia	11.43	Ailis McSweeney; Ireland	11.68	Nikolett Listár; Hungary	11.71
2007	Johanna Manninen; Finland	11.46	Elena Chebanu; Ukraine	11.56	Audra Dagelytė; Lithuania	11.65
2009	Lina Grincikaitė; Lithuania	11.31	Momoko Takahashi; Japan	11.52	Sónia Tavares; Portugal	11.54
2011	Carrie Russell; Jamaica	11.05 =PB	Khrystyna Stuy; Ukraine	11.34 PB	Lina Grinčikaitė; Lithuania	11.44
2013	Aurieyall Scott; United States	11.28	Lina Grinčikaitė; Lithuania	11.32	Andreea Ogrăzeanu; Romania	11.41
2015	Viktoriya Zyabkina; Kazakhstan	11.23	Shimayra Williams; Jamaica	11.46	Yelena Kozlova; Russia	11.47
2017	Shashalee Forbes; Jamaica	11.18	Irene Siragusa; Italy	11.31 PB	Salomé Kora; Switzerland	11.33
2019	Dutee Chand; India	11.32	Ajla Del Ponte; Switzerland	11.33	Lisa-Marie Kwayie; Germany	11.39

=== 200m ===
Games	Gold		Silver		Bronze	
1959	Giuseppina Leone (ITA)	23.8	Barbara Janiszewska (POL)	24.2	Lyudmila Nechayeva (URS)	24.7
1961	Barbara Janiszewska (POL)	24.44	Joan Atkinson (GBR)	24.49	Vera Kabranyuk (URS)	24.70
1963	Jutta Heine (FRG)	24.60	Renāte Lāce (URS)	24.64	Miguelina Cobián (CUB)	24.74
1965	Irena Kirszenstein (POL)	23.5	Miguelina Cobián (CUB)	23.9	Liz Gill (GBR)	24.0
1967	Gabrielle Meyer (FRA)	23.8	Barbara Ferrell (USA)	23.9	Jannette Champion (GBR)	24.7
1970	Renate Meißner (GDR)	22.7	Györgyi Balogh (HUN)	23.2	Wilma van den Berg (NED)	23.5
1973	Mona-Lisa Pursiainen (FIN)	22.39	Marina Sidorova (URS)	22.72	Ellen Stropahl (GDR)	22.73
1975	Pirjo Häggman (FIN)	23.38	Mona-Lisa Pursiainen (FIN)	23.61	Jelica Pavličić (YUG)	23.78
1977	Silvia Chivás (CUB)	23.08	Marina Sidorova (URS)	23.09	Andrea Lynch (GBR)	23.23
1979	Marita Koch (GDR)	21.91 UR	Kathy Smallwood (GBR)	22.70	Beverley Goddard (GBR)	22.76
1981	Kathy Smallwood (GBR)	22.78	Marisa Masullo (ITA)	23.36	Irina Nazarova (URS)	23.45
1983	Randy Givens (USA)	22.47	Marita Payne (CAN)	22.62	Grace Jackson (JAM)	22.69
1985	Grace Jackson (JAM)	22.59	Elżbieta Tomczak (POL)	22.76	Irina Slyusar (URS)	22.86
1987	Gwen Torrence (USA)	22.44	Mary Onyali (NGR)	22.64	Dannette Young (USA)	22.72
1989	Galina Malchugina (URS)	22.70	Liliana Allen (CUB)	23.00	Esther Jones (USA)	23.02
1991	Wang Huei-chen (TPE)	23.22	Sølvi Olsen (NOR)	23.41	Michelle Collins (USA)	23.47
1993	Flirtisha Harris (USA)	22.56w	Dahlia Duhaney (JAM)	22.79w	Wang Huei-chen (TPE)	22.80w
1995	Du Xiujie (CHN)	22.53	Oksana Dyachenko (RUS)	22.89	Zlatka Georgieva (BUL)	23.04
1997	Yekaterina Leshcheva (RUS)	23.18	Katia Benth (FRA)	23.31	Monika Gachevska (BUL)	23.60
1999	Kim Gevaert (BEL)	23.10	Zuzanna Radecka (POL)	23.14	Nanceen Perry (USA)	23.27
2001	Li Xuemei (CHN)	22.86	Kim Gevaert (BEL)	22.94	Natallia Safronnikava (BLR)	23.16
2003	Yelena Bolsun; Russia	23.39	Yekaterina Kondratyeva; Russia	23.43	Jenice Daley; Jamaica	23.55
2005	Natalya Ivanova; Russia	23.28	Yelena Yakovleva; Russia	23.45	Élodie Ouédraogo; Belgium	23.62
2007	Iryna Shtanhyeyeva; Ukraine	22.95	Kadi-Ann Thomas; Great Britain	23.28 PB	Hanna Mariën; Belgium	23.48
2009	Monique Williams; New Zealand	23.11	Isabel Le Roux; South Africa	23.18	Sabina Veit; Slovenia	23.34
2011	Anneisha McLaughlin; Jamaica	22.54 =PB	Tiffany Townsend; United States	22.96	Anna Kaygorodova; Russia	23.16 PB
2013	Kimberly Hyacinthe; Canada	22.78 PB	Hanna-Maari Latvala; Finland	22.98 PB	Andreea Ogrăzeanu; Romania	23.10 PB
2015	Viktoriya Zyabkina; Kazakhstan	22.77 NR	Akeyla Mitchell; United States	22.95 PB	Kedisha Dallas; Jamaica	23.24 PB
2017	Irene Siragusa; Italy	22.96 PB	Gunta Latiševa-Čudare; Latvia	23.15 PB	Anna Bongiorni; Italy	23.47
2019	Krystsina Tsimanouskaya; Belarus	23.00 PB	Jessica-Bianca Wessolly; Germany	23.05	Lisa-Marie Kwayie; Germany	23.11 PB

=== 400 m ===
Games	Gold		Silver		Bronze	
1967	Elisabeth Östberg (SWE)	55.4	Gabriele Grossekettler (FRG)	56.0	Biruta Vilmanis (AUS)	56.5
1970	Maria Sykora (AUT)	52.8	Carmen Trustée (CUB)	53.5	Aurelia Pentón (CUB)	53.8
1973	Nadezhda Kolesnikova (URS)	52.04	Judy Canty (AUS)	52.82	Carmen Trustée (CUB)	53.44
1975	Pirjo Häggman (FIN)	51.80 GR	Inta Kļimoviča (URS)	52.25	Jelica Pavličić (YUG)	52.50
1977	Rosalyn Bryant (USA)	52.10	Natalya Sokolova (URS)	52.15	Beatriz Castillo (CUB)	52.95
1979	Mariya Kulchunova (URS)	50.35 UR	Rosalyn Bryant (USA)	51.35	Christina Brehmer (GDR)	51.59
1981	Irina Baskakova (URS)	51.45	Nadezhda Lyalina (URS)	51.56	Sophie Malbranque (FRA)	52.52
1983	Mariya Pinigina (URS)	50.47	Molly Killingbeck (CAN)	51.94	Yelena Korban (URS)	52.07
1985	Tatyana Alekseyeva (URS)	51.49	Ana Fidelia Quirot (CUB)	52.10	Sadia Showunmi (NGR)	52.78
1987	Denean Howard (USA)	51.07	Lyudmyla Dzhyhalova (URS)	51.32	Sandie Richards (JAM)	51.42
1989	Ana Fidelia Quirot (CUB)	50.73	Jearl Miles (USA)	52.41	Lyudmyla Dzhyhalova (URS)	52.69
1991	Maicel Malone (USA)	50.65	Gretha Tromp (NED)	52.06	Galina Moskvina (URS)	52.34
1993	Michelle Collins (USA)	52.01	Youlanda Warren (USA)	52.18	Nancy McLeón (CUB)	52.84
1995	Olabisi Afolabi (NGR)	50.50	Tatyana Chebykina (RUS)	51.01	Olena Rurak (UKR)	51.76
1997	Allison Curbishley (GBR)	50.84	Olga Kotlyarova (RUS)	51.35	Idalmis Bonne (CUB)	51.72
1999	Ionela Târlea (ROM)	49.88 UR	Miki Barber (USA)	51.03	Doris Jacob (NGR)	51.04
2001	Demetria Washington (USA)	51.22	Otilia Ruicu (ROU)	51.82	Miki Barber (USA)	51.92
2003	Tatyana Firova; Russia	51.81	Mariya Lisnichenko; Russia	52.54	Estie Wittstock; South Africa	52.86
2005	Natalya Nazarova; Russia	51.31	Fatou Bintou Fall; Senegal	51.33	Tatyana Roslanova; Kazakhstan	52.46
2007	Olga Tereshkova; Kazakhstan	51.62 PB	Danijela Grgić; Croatia	51.88 SB	Ksenia Zadorina; Russia	51.89
2009	Fatou Bintou Fall; Senegal	51.65	Esther Akinsulie; Canada	51.70	Carline Muir; Canada	52.07
2011	Olga Topilskaya; Russia	51.63	Yelena Migunova; Russia	51.77 SB	Diamond Dixon; United States	52.76
2013	Kseniya Ustalova; Russia	50.60	Alyona Tamkova; Russia	51.17	Anastasia Le-Roy; Jamaica	51.72
2015	Justine Palframan; South Africa	51.27 PB	Małgorzata Hołub; Poland	51.93 SB	Yang Huizhen; China	51.98 PB
2017	Małgorzata Hołub-Kowalik; Poland	51.76	Justine Palframan; South Africa	51.83 SB	Bianca Răzor; Romania	51.97
2019	Paola Morán; Mexico	51.52 SB	Leni Shida; Uganda	51.64 SB	Amandine Brossier; France	51.77 PB

=== 800m ===
Games	Gold		Silver		Bronze	
1959	Nicole Goullieux (FRA)	2:11.1	Edith Schiller (FRG)	2:11.3	Klavdiya Babintseva (URS)	2:12.3
1961	Antje Gleichfeld (FRG)	2:07.76	Florica Grecescu (ROM)	2:08.67	Tsvetana Isaeva (BUL)	2:12.59
1963	Olga Kazi (HUN)	2:05.9	Antje Gleichfeld (FRG)	2:08.2	Joy Catling (GBR)	2:10.3
1965	Laine Erik (URS)	2:06.2	Antje Gleichfeld (FRG)	2:06.6	Abby Hoffman (CAN)	2:07.8
1967	Madeline Manning (USA)	2:06.8	Abby Hoffman (CAN)	2:08.5	Elisabeth Östberg (SWE)	2:08.9
1970	Gunhild Hoffmeister (GDR)	2:01.8	Maria Sykora (AUT)	2:01.9	Karin Burneleit (GDR)	2:02.2
1973	Lilyana Tomova (BUL)	1:59.52	Nijolė Sabaitė (URS)	2:00.19	Elżbieta Katolik (POL)	2:00.85
1975	Nina Morgunova (URS)	2:01.94	Jozefína Čerchlanová (TCH)	2:02.45	Nikolina Shtereva (BUL)	2:02.74
1977	Totka Petrova (BUL)	1:57.6	Tatyana Kazankina (URS)	1:58.6	Svetla Koleva (BUL)	1:58.9
1979	Nadezhda Mushta (URS)	2:00.50	Olga Dvirna (URS)	2:00.77	Fița Lovin (ROM)	2:00.81
1981	Doina Melinte (ROM)	1:57.81	Gabriella Dorio (ITA)	1:58.99	Tudorita Morutan (ROM)	1:59.30
1983	Irina Podyalovskaya (URS)	1:59.29	Robin Campbell (USA)	1:59.81	Doina Melinte (ROU)	1:59.93
1985	Nadezhda Zvyagintseva (URS)	1:58.59	Cristieana Cojocaru (ROM)	1:59.09	Ana Fidelia Quirot (CUB)	1:59.77
1987	Slobodanka Čolović (YUG)	1:56.88	Mitica Junghiatu (ROM)	1:59.28	Joetta Clark (USA)	1:59.92
1989	Ana Fidelia Quirot (CUB)	1:58.88	Ellen van Langen (NED)	1:59.82	Inna Yevseyeva (URS)	2:01.03
1991	Inna Yevseyeva (URS)	1:59.80	Gabi Lesch (GER)	2:00.97	Jasmin Jones (USA)	2:02.00
1993	Amy Wickus (USA)	2:03.72	Inez Turner (JAM)	2:04.14	Daniela Antipov (ROM)	2:04.75
1995	Stella Jongmans (NED)	2:02.13	Svetlana Tverdokhleb (UKR)	2:02.92	Natalie Tait (GBR)	2:03.32
1997	Irina Nedelenko (UKR)	2:00.21	Olena Buzhenko (UKR)	2:00.84	Mariya Sinyusova (RUS)	2:01.38
1999	Yuliya Taranova (RUS)	1:59.63	Brigita Langerholc (SLO)	1:59.87	Elena Buhăianu (ROM)	2:00.26
2001	Brigita Langerholc (SLO)	2:00.96	Nédia Semedo (POR)	2:01.64	Tatyana Rodionova (RUS)	2:01.68
2003	Liliana Barbulescu; Romania	2:00.06	Anna Zagórska; Poland	2:00.11	Irina Vashentseva; Russia	2:00.77
2005	Svetlana Klyuka; Russia	2:00.80	Binnaz Uslu; Turkey	2:01.42	Marilyn Okoro; Great Britain	2:01.90
2007	Yuliya Krevsun; Ukraine	1:57.63 WL, PB	Yekaterina Kostetskaya; Russia	1:59.52	Charlotte Best; Great Britain	2:01.50 PB
2009	Madeleine Pape; Australia	2:01.91	Olga Cristea; Moldova	2:03.49	Rebecca Johnstone; Canada	2:03.67
2011	Olha Zavhorodnya; Ukraine	1:59.56 PB	Elena Kofanova; Russia	1:59.94	Liliya Lobanova; Ukraine	2:00.42
2013	Margarita Mukasheva; Kazakhstan	1:58.96	Yekaterina Kupina; Russia	1:59.57	Eglė Balčiūnaitė; Lithuania	1:59.82
2015	Angie Petty; New Zealand	1:59.06 PB	Simoya Campbell; Jamaica	1:59.26 PB	Fabienne Kohlmann; Germany	1:59.54 PB
2017	Rose Mary Almanza; Cuba	2:02.21	Olha Lyakhova; Ukraine	2:03.11	Dorcus Ajok; Uganda	2:03.22
2019	Catriona Bisset; Australia	2:01.20	Christina Hering; Germany	2:01.87	Dorcus Ajok; Uganda	2:02.31 SB

=== 1500m ===
Games	Gold		Silver		Bronze	
1973	Paola Pigni-Cacchi (ITA)	4:10.69	Glenda Reiser (CAN)	4:12.50	Tonka Petrova (BUL)	4:13.50
1975	Ellen Wellmann (FRG)	4:08.72	Natalia Andrei (ROM)	4:08.84	Rositsa Pekhlivanova (BUL)	4:10.17
1977	Totka Petrova (BUL)	4:05.7	Natalia Mărășescu (ROM)	4:05.8	Maricica Puică (ROM)	4:06.4
1979	Natalia Mărășescu (ROM)	4:13.9	Olga Dvirna (URS)	4:14.5	Valentina Ilyinykh (URS)	4:14.6
1981	Gabriella Dorio (ITA)	4:05.35 GR	Doina Melinte (ROM)	4:05.74	Olga Dvirna (URS)	4:06.39
1983	Gabriella Dorio (ITA)	4:07.26	Doina Melinte (ROU)	4:07.34	Maria Radu (ROU)	4:08.41
1985	Svetlana Kitova (URS)	4:07.12	Margareta Keszeg (ROM)	4.07.55	Darlene Beckford (USA)	4:08.84
1987	Paula Ivan (ROM)	4:01.32	Svetlana Kitova (URS)	4.03.03	Mitica Junghiatu (ROM)	4:03.04
1989	Paula Ivan (ROM)	4:13.58	Suzy Favor (USA)	4:14.92	Lyudmila Rogachova (URS)	4:15.11
1991	Sonia O'Sullivan (IRL)	4:12.14	Iulia Besliu (ROM)	4:12.24	Qu Yunxia (CHN)	4:12.43
1993	Lynne Robinson (GBR)	4:12.03	Julie Speights (USA)	4:12.43	Sarah Howell (CAN)	4:13.30
1995	Gabriela Szabo (ROM)	4:11.73	Julie Henner (USA)	4:12.70	Ursula Friedmann (GER)	4:13.32
1997	Gabriela Szabo (ROM)	4:10.31	Carla Sacramento (POR)	4:10.40	Lidia Chojecka (POL)	4:12.38
1999	Elena Buhăianu (ROM)	4:13.04	Luminița Gogîrlea (ROM)	4:14.61	Ana Amelia Menéndez (ESP)	4:14.95
2001	Süreyya Ayhan (TUR)	4:06.91	Maria Cristina Grosu (ROU)	4:08.84	Sabine Fischer (SUI)	4:08.93
2003	Natalya Sidorenko; Ukraine	4:11.69	Johanna Risku; Finland	4:11.88	Malindi Elmore; Canada	4:12.00
2005	Olesya Syreva; Russia	4:12.69	Tetyana Holovchenko; Ukraine	4:12.73	Liu Qing; China	4:12.76
2007	Olesya Chumakova; Russia	4:09.32	Tetyana Holovchenko; Ukraine	4:10.46	Sylwia Ejdys; Poland	4:11.51
2009	Marina Munćan; Serbia	4:15.53	Kaila McKnight; Australia	4:16.10	Elena Garcia Grimau; Spain	4:17.02
2011	Anna Mishchenko; Ukraine	4:05.91	Denise Krebs; Germany	4:07.70	Liu Fang; China	4:07.90
2013	Yelena Korobkina; Russia	4:08.13	Luiza Gega; Albania	4:08.71	Margherita Magnani; Italy	4:09.72
2015	Dorcus Ajok; Uganda	4:18.53 SB	Gabriela Stafford; Canada	4:19.27	Kristina Ugarova; Russia	4:19.78
2017	Amela Terzić; Serbia	4:19.18	Dorcus Ajok; Uganda	4:19.48	Kristiina Mäki; Czech Republic	4:20.65
2019	Caterina Granz; Germany	4:09.14 SB	Georgia Griffith; Australia	4:09.89	Courtney Hufsmith; Canada	4:11.81 PB

=== 3000m ===
Games	Gold		Silver		Bronze	
1975	Natalia Andrei (ROM)	8:54.09	Thelma Wright (CAN)	8:54.94	Svetlana Ulmasova (URS)	8:55.88
1981	Breda Pergar (YUG)	8:53.78 GR	Valentina Ilyinykh (URS)	8:54.23	Maria Radu (ROM)	8:58.58
1983	Maria Radu (ROU)	9:04.32	Yelena Malychina (URS)	9:06.17	Lynn Williams (CAN)	9:07.74
1985	Cathy Branta (USA)	9:02.75	Kathy Hayes (USA)	9:02.92	Angela Chalmers (CAN)	9:03.19
1987	Paula Ivan (ROM)	8:53.61	Anne Schweitzer (USA)	8:59.56	Natalya Artyomova (URS)	9:02.98
1989	Paula Ivan (ROM)	8:44.09 GR	Viorica Ghican (ROM)	8:46.27	Regina Chistyakova (URS)	8:55.73
1991	Iulia Besliu (ROM)	8:55.42	Sonia O'Sullivan (IRL)	8:56.35	Zita Ágoston (HUN)	9:01.09
1993	Clare Eichner (USA)	9:04.32	Iulia Ionescu (ROM)	9:05.10	Rosalind Taylor (USA)	9:06.25

=== 5000m ===
Games	Gold		Silver		Bronze	
1995	Gabriela Szabo (ROM)	15:29.86	Silvia Sommaggio (ITA)	15:34.32	Yumi Sato (JPN)	15:35.28
1997	Nnenna Lynch (USA)	15:47.61	Lori Durward (CAN)	15:48.68	Sarah Howell (CAN)	15:49.96
1999	Rie Ueno (JPN)	15:51.24	Ana Dias (POR)	15:53.23	Cristina Casandra (ROM)	16:03.18
2001	Dong Yanmei (CHN)	15:30.28	Tatyana Khmeleva (RUS)	15:43.18	Yoshiko Fujinaga (JPN)	15:43.94
2003	Eloise Poppett; Australia	15:47.19	Zhang Yuhong; China	15:47.62	Cristina Casandra; Romania	15:50.44
2005	Kim Smith; New Zealand	15:29.18	Tetyana Holovchenko; Ukraine	15:44.92	Jolene Byrne; Ireland	15:56.01
2007	Jéssica Augusto; Portugal	15:28.78 CR	Tetyana Holovchenko; Ukraine	15:40.56	Yelizaveta Grechishnikova; Russia	15:50.58
2009	Sara Moreira; Portugal	15:32.78	Kasumi Nishihara; Japan	15:46.95	Natalia Medvedeva; Russia	15:49.60
2011	Binnaz Uslu; Turkey	15:41.15 PB	Sara Moreira; Portugal	15:45.83	Natalya Popkova; Russia	15:52.55
2013	Olga Golovkina; Russia	15:43.77	Ayuko Suzuki; Japan	15:51.47	Mai Shoji; Japan	16:11.90
2015	Kristiina Mäki; Czech Republic	16:03.29	Camille Buscomb; New Zealand	16:03.72	Darya Maslova; Kyrgyzstan	16:04.09
2017	Hanna Klein; Germany	15:45.28	Jessica O'Connell; Canada	15:50.96	Jessica Judd; Great Britain	15:51.19
2019	Jessica Judd; Great Britain	15:45.82	Nicole Hutchinson; Canada	15:48.06	Julia van Velthoven; Netherlands	15:51.75 PB

=== 10,000m ===
Games	Gold		Silver		Bronze	
1985	Marina Rodchenkova (URS)	32:58.45	Svetlana Guskova (URS)	32:59.24	Kirsten O'Hara (USA)	33:05.84
1987	Patty Murray (USA)	33:11.26	Zhong Huandi (CHN)	33:11.59	Yelena Uskova (URS)	33:14.71
1989	Viorica Ghican (ROM)	31:46.43 GR	Masami Ishizaka (JPN)	32:16.24	Lizanne Bussières (CAN)	32:28.38
1991	Anne Marie Letko (USA)	32:36.87	Suzana Ćirić (YUG)	32:37.94	Olga Nazarkina (URS)	32:40.83
1993	Iulia Negură (ROM)	32:22.99	Suzana Ćirić (IPU)^{†}	32:26.68	Alina Tecuţa (ROM)	32:29.18
1995	Iulia Negură (ROM)	32:28.25	Alina Tecuţa (ROM)	32:43.38	Yasuko Kimura (JPN)	33:03.01
1997	Deena Drossin (USA)	33:45.31	Lucilla Andreucci (ITA)	33:54.22	Miwako Yamanaka (JPN)	34:10.28
1999	Leigh Daniel (USA)	32:58.80	Yuri Kanō (JPN)	33:16.41	Annemette Jensen (DEN)	33:36.11
2001	Dong Yanmei (CHN)	32:45.14	Yoshiko Fujinaga (JPN)	32:53.55	Yukiko Akaba (JPN)	32:57.35
2003	Natalia Cercheș; Moldova	33:37.05	Alena Samokhvalova; Russia	33:40.57	Anna Incerti; Italy	33:49.71
2005	Eri Sato; Japan	34:12.06	Zeng Guang; China	34:57.57	Mary Davies; New Zealand	35:58.20
2007	Kseniya Agafonova; Russia	32:20.94	Ryoko Kizaki; Japan	32:55.11 PB	Jo Bun-hui; North Korea	33:20.55
2009	Kasumi Nishihara; Japan	33:14.62	Tatiana Shutova; Russia	33:29.99	Volha Minina; Belarus	33:32.35
2011	Fadime Suna; Turkey	33:11.92	Hanae Tanaka; Japan	33:15.57	Mai Ishibashi; Japan	33:41.90
2013	Ayuko Suzuki; Japan	32:54.17	Alina Prokopeva; Russia	33:00.93	Mai Tsuda; Japan	33:14.59
2015	Alla Kuliatina; Russia	32:52.27 PB	Gulshat Fazlitdinova; Russia	32:55.35	Zhang Yingying; China	32:56.60 SB
2017	Darya Maslova; Kyrgyzstan	33:19.27	Sanjivani Jadhav; India	33:22.00 PB	Ai Hosoda; Japan	33:27.89
2019	Zhang Deshun; China	34:03.31	Rino Goshima; Japan	34:04.65	Natsuki Sekiya; Japan	34:05.84

=== Half marathon ===
Games	Gold		Silver		Bronze	
1997	Mari Sotani (JPN)	1:11:49	Agata Balsamo (ITA)	1:13:06	Miyuki Tokura (JPN)	1:13:20
1999	Rosaria Console (ITA)	1:14:14	Yukiko Akaba (JPN)	1:14:35	Marta Fernández (ESP)	1:14:52
2001	Ham Bong-sil (PRK)	1:15:24	Miki Oyama (JPN)	1:15:31	Kim Chang-ok (PRK)	1:15:36
2003	Machi Tanaka; Japan	1:13:06	Jo Bun-hui; North Korea	1:13:47	Jang Son-Ok; North Korea	1:13:55
2005	Lee Eun-jung; South Korea	1:14:31	Ryoko Kizaki; Japan	1:14:34	Jang Son-ok; North Korea	1:14:50
2007	Kim Kum-ok; North Korea	1:12:31	Kei Terada; Japan	1:12:37	Jong Yong-ok; North Korea	1:13:56
2009	Chisato Saito; Japan	1:13:44	Kikuyo Tsuzaki; Japan	1:14:03	Sayo Nomura; Japan	1:14:23
2011	Ro Un-ok; North Korea	1:16:38	Jin Lingling; China	1:16:42	Sayo Nomura; Japan	1:16:48
2013	Mai Tsuda; Japan	1:13:12	Alina Prokopeva; Russia	1:13:18	Yukiko Okuno; Japan	1:13:24
2015	Zhang Yingying; China	1:15:06	Nanako Kanno; Japan	1:15:24	Ayumi Uehara; Japan	1:15:35
2017	Yuki Munehisa; Japan	1:13:48	Esma Aydemir; Turkey	1:14:28	Saki Fukui; Japan	1:14:37
2019	Yuka Suzuki; Japan	1:14:10	Rika Kaseda; Japan	1:14:32	Yuki Tagawa; Japan	1:14:36

=== Marathon ===
Games	Gold		Silver		Bronze	
1983	Sarah Rowell (GBR)	2:47:37 UR	Kathy Roberts (CAN)	2:52:47	Marjorie Kaput (USA)	2:54:03
1985	Mami Fukao (JPN)	2:44:55	Patti Gray (USA)	2:46:20	Sylvie Bornet (FRA)	2:48:11
1987	Natalya Bardina (URS)	2:46:30	Takako Kanesashi (JPN)	2:46:33	Karlene Erickson (USA)	3:03:00
1989	Irina Bogachova (URS)	2:35:09 GR	Akemi Takayama (JPN)	2:39:58	Kim Yen-ku (KOR)	2:40:52
1991	Miyako Iwai (JPN)	2:36:27	Kim Yen-ku (KOR)	2:37:58	Mariya Doskoch (URS)	2:38:48
1993	Noriko Kawaguchi (JPN)	2:37:47	Franca Fiacconi (ITA)	2:38:44	Nao Otani (JPN)	2:40:17
1995	Masako Kusakaya (JPN)	2:53:03	Nao Otani (JPN)	2:57:09	Kristi Klinnert (USA)	2:57:29

=== 100m hurdles ===
- 80m until 1967

Games	Gold		Silver		Bronze	
1959	Nelli Yelisayeva (URS)	11.1	Snezhana Kerkova (BUL)	11.4	Elżbieta Krzesińska (POL)	11.5
1961	Irina Press (URS)	10.90	Rimma Koshelyova (URS)	11.01	Snezhana Kerkova (BUL)	11.09
1963	Jutta Heine (FRG)	10.95	Tatyana Shchelkanova (URS)	11.01	Alla Chernisheva (URS)	11.10
1965	Danuta Straszyńska (POL)	10.6	Snezhana Kerkova (BUL)	10.8	Tatyana Ilyina (URS)	10.9
1967	Françoise Masse (FRA)	11.3	Sheila Garnett (GBR)	11.3	Ayako Natsume (JPN)	11.3
1970	Teresa Sukniewicz (POL)	13.0	Bärbel Podeswa (GDR)	13.4	Valeria Bufanu (ROM)	13.5
1973	Grażyna Rabsztyn (POL)	13.23	Annerose Krumpholz (GDR)	13.38	Natalya Lebedeva (URS)	13.50
1975	Grażyna Rabsztyn (POL)	13.14	Bożena Nowakowska (POL)	13.34	Tatyana Anisimova (URS)	13.64
1977	Grażyna Rabsztyn (POL)	12.86	Tatyana Anisimova (URS)	13.03	Natalya Lebedeva (URS)	13.05
1979	Lucyna Langer (POL)	12.62 UR	Danuta Perka (POL)	12.66	Vera Komisova (URS)	12.90
1981	Stephanie Hightower (USA)	13.03	Mariya Kemenchezhiy (URS)	13.13	Elżbieta Rabsztyn (POL)	13.31
1983	Natalya Petrova (URS)	13.04	Yelena Biserova (URS)	13.07	Benita Fitzgerald (USA)	13.24
1985	Ginka Zagorcheva (BUL)	12.71	Nadezhda Korshunova (URS)	12.87	Anne Piquereau (FRA)	12.96
1987	Heike Theele (GDR)	12.84	Aliuska López (CUB)	12.84	Florence Colle (FRA)	12.84
1989	Monique Éwanjé-Épée (FRA)	12.65 GR, NR	Lidiya Okolo-Kulak (URS)	12.73	Claudia Zaczkiewicz (FRG)	12.78
1991	Marina Azyabina (URS)	12.95	Mary Cobb (USA)	13.19	Keri Maddox (GBR)	13.32
1993	Dawn Bowles (USA)	13.16	Marsha Guialdo (USA)	13.24	Nicole Ramalalanirina (MAD)	13.28
1995	Nicole Ramalalanirina (MAD)	13.02	Olena Ovcharova (UKR)	13.07	Svetlana Laukhova (RUS)	13.08
1997	Angela Atede (NGR)	13.16	Feng Yun (CHN)	13.19	Svetlana Laukhova (RUS)	13.22
1999	Andria King (USA)	13.04	Yolanda McCray (USA)	13.08	Diane Allahgreen (GBR)	13.17
2001	Su Yiping (CHN)	12.95	Maurren Maggi (BRA)	13.13	Jacquie Munro (AUS)	13.17
2003	Xu Jia; China	13.29	Yevgeniya Likhuta; Belarus	13.33	Natalia Kresova; Russia	13.35
2005	Mirjam Liimask; Estonia	12.96	Tatyana Pavliy; Russia	13.01	Derval O'Rourke; Ireland	13.02
2007	Yauheniya Valadzko; Belarus	13.03 PB	Nevin Yanıt; Turkey	13.07	Yevgeniya Snihur; Ukraine	13.08
2009	Nevin Yanıt; Turkey	12.89	Sonata Tamošaitytė; Lithuania	13.10	Andrea Miller; New Zealand	13.13
2011	Nia Sifaatihii Ali; United States	12.85	Natalya Ivoninskaya; Kazakhstan	13.16	Christina Manning; United States	13.17
2013	Vashti Thomas; United States	12.61 UR	Alina Talay; Belarus	12.78 SB	Danielle Williams; Jamaica	12.84
2015	Danielle Williams; Jamaica	12.78	Nina Morozova; Russia	12.83	Michelle Jenneke; Australia	12.94
2017	Nadine Visser; Netherlands	12.98	Elvira Herman; Belarus	13.17	Luca Kozák; Hungary	13.19
2019	Luminosa Bogliolo; Italy	12.79 PB	Reetta Hurske; Finland	13.02	Coralie Comte; France	13.09 PB

=== 400m hurdles ===
Games	Gold		Silver		Bronze	
1981	Anna Kastyetskaya (URS)	55.52 GR	Birgit Sonntag (GDR)	55.90	Tatyana Zubova (URS)	57.07
1983	Yekaterina Fesenko (URS)	54.97 UR	Yelena Filipishina (URS)	56.10	Gwen Wall (CAN)	56.10
1985	Margarita Navickaitė (URS)	55.33	Cristieana Cojocaru (ROM)	55.44	Nawal El Moutawakel (MAR)	55.59
1987	Nawal El Moutawakel (MAR)	55.21	Nicoleta Căruțașu (ROM)	55.35	Sophia Hunter (USA)	55.45
1989	Margarita Khromova (URS)	57.03	Rosey Edeh (CAN)	57.06	Irmgard Trojer (ITA)	57.94
1991	Gretha Tromp (NED)	55.30	Nicoleta Căruțașu (ROM)	56.07	Anna Chuprina (URS)	56.74
1993	Heike Meißner (GER)	56.10	Debbie-Ann Parris (JAM)	56.11	Trevaia Williams (USA)	56.57
1995	Heike Meißner (GER)	55.57	Ionela Târlea (ROM)	55.99	Tonya Williams (USA)	56.04
1997	Tetyana Tereshchuk (UKR)	54.91	Yekaterina Bakhvalova (RUS)	55.91	Daimí Pernía (CUB)	56.13
1999	Daimí Pernía (CUB)	53.95 UR	Joanna Hayes (USA)	54.57	Ulrike Urbansky (GER)	54.93
2001	Tasha Danvers (GBR)	54.94	Małgorzata Pskit (POL)	55.27	Sonia Brito (AUS)	55.72
2003	Maren Schott; Germany	55.28	Huang Xiaoxiao; China	56.10	Anastasiya Rabchenyuk; Ukraine	56.30
2005	Marina Shiyan; Russia	55.14	Benedetta Ceccarelli; Italy	55.22	Marta Chrust; Poland	55.49
2007	Tatyana Azarova; Kazakhstan	55.52	Anastasiya Rabchenyuk; Ukraine	55.98	Jonna Tilgner; Germany	56.27 SB
2009	Vania Stambolova; Bulgaria	55.14	Jonna Tilgner; Germany	56.02	Sara Slott Petersen; Denmark	56.40
2011	Hanna Yaroshchuk; Ukraine	55.15	Irina Davydova; Russia	55.50	Nagihan Karadere; Turkey	55.81
2013	Hanna Titimets; Ukraine	54.64	Hanna Yaroshchuk; Ukraine	54.77	Irina Davydova; Russia	54.79
2015	Joanna Linkiewicz; Poland	55.62	Emilia Ankiewicz; Poland	56.55 SB	Irina Takuncheva; Russia	56.57 PB
2017	Ayomide Folorunso; Italy	55.63 SB	Joanna Linkiewicz; Poland	55.90	Olena Kolesnichenko; Ukraine	56.14
2019	Ayomide Folorunso; Italy	54.75 PB	Zenéy van der Walt; South Africa	55.73 SB	Amalie Iuel; Norway	56.13

=== 3000m steeplechase ===
Games	Gold		Silver		Bronze	
2005	Lívia Tóth; Hungary	9:40.37 CR	Victoria Mitchell; Australia	9:47.54	Türkan Erişmiş; Turkey	9:50.32
2007	Dobrinka Shalamanova; Bulgaria	9:45.04	Valentyna Gorpynych; Ukraine	9:45.55	Türkan Erişmiş; Turkey	9:46.12 PB
2009	Sara Moreira; Portugal	9:32.62 UR	Ancuța Bobocel; Romania	9:38.14	Türkan Erişmiş; Turkey	9:38.87
2011	Binnaz Uslu; Turkey	9:33.50 PB	Lyudmila Kuzmina; Russia	9:44.77	Jin Yuan; China	9:45.21 SB
2013	Chantelle Groenewoud; Canada	9:51.17	Jessica Furlan; Canada	9:51.23	Sandra Eriksson; Finland	9:55.11
2015	Yekaterina Sokolenko; Russia	9:25.77 UR	Natalya Vlasova; Russia	9:35.99 SB	Özlem Kaya; Turkey	9:37.79
2017	Tuğba Güvenç; Turkey	9:51.27	Viktória Gyürkés; Hungary	9:52.17	Özlem Kaya; Turkey	9:52.59
2019	Alicja Konieczek; Poland	9:41.46 SB	Belén Casetta; Argentina	9:43.05 SB	Meswat Asmare Dagnaw; Ethiopia	9:45.48 PB

=== 5km walk ===
Games	Gold		Silver		Bronze	
1985	Aleksandra Grigoryeva (URS)	22:21.10	Yan Hong (CHN)	22:25.77	Natalya Serbinenko (URS)	22:27.21
1987	Li Sujie (CHN)	21:51.50	Yelena Rodionova (URS)	22:00.01	Ann Peel (CAN)	22:01.09
1989	Ileana Salvador (ITA)	20:44	Vera Makolova (URS)	20:52	Sari Essayah (FIN)	21:34

=== 10km walk ===
Games	Gold		Silver		Bronze	
1991	Sari Essayah (FIN)	44:04	Chen Yueling (CHN)	44:33	Annarita Sidoti (ITA)	45:10
1993	Long Yuwen (CHN)	46:16.75	Olga Leonenko (UKR)	46:18.40	Larisa Ramazanova (RUS)	46:18.58
1995	Annarita Sidoti (ITA)	43:22 GR	Rossella Giordano (ITA)	43:30	Larisa Ramazanova (RUS)	43:56
1997	Larisa Ramazanova (BLR)	44:01	Rossella Giordano (ITA)	44:31	Annarita Sidoti (ITA)	44:38
1999	Claudia Iovan (ROM)	44:22	Rossella Giordano (ITA)	44:39	Valentyna Savchuk (UKR)	45:23
2001	Gao Hongmiao (CHN)	43:20 UR	Susana Feitor (POR)	43:40	Wang Liping (CHN)	44:01

=== 20 km walk ===
Games	Gold		Silver		Bronze	
2003	Tatyana Sibileva; Russia	1:34.55	Jiang Xingli; China	1:35:52	Tatyana Korotkova; Russia	1:36.52
2005	Jiang Qiuyan; China	1:33:13 CR	Vera Santos; Portugal	1:33.54	Tatyana Sibileva; Russia	1:34.16
2007	Jiang Qiuyan; China	1:35:22	Lidia Mongelli; Italy	1:37:23	Sniazhana Yurchanka; Belarus	1:37:26
2009	Olga Mikhaylova; Russia	1:30:43 UR	Masumi Fuchise; Japan	1:31:42	Olga Povalyaeva; Russia	1:33:58
2011	Júlia Takács; Spain	1:33:51	Tatyana Shemyakina; Russia	1:34:23	Nina Okhotnikova; Russia	1:35:10
2013	Irina Yumanova; Russia	1:30:41	Lina Bikulova; Russia	1:32:30	Hanna Drabenia; Belarus	1:33:15
2015	Anisya Kirdyapkina; Russia	1:28:18 UR	Marina Pandakova; Russia	1:29:52	Hou Yongbo; China	1:32:42
2017	Inna Kashyna; Ukraine	1:39:44	Zhang Xin; China	1:41:18	Elisa Neuvonen; Finland	1:42:50
2019	Katie Hayward; Australia	1:33:30	Jemima Montag; Australia	1:33:57	Anežka Drahotová; Czech Republic	1:35:44

=== 20 km walk team ===
Games	Gold		Silver		Bronze	
2011	China (CHN); Shi Yang; Yang Yawei; Wang Shanshan	4:58:57				
2013	China (CHN); Yang Mingxia; Gao Ni; Zhou Tongmei; Zhang Xin	4:49:54	Russia (RUS); Lina Bikulova; Vera Sokolova; Irina Yumanova	3:33:11	none	
2015	Russia (RUS); Anisya Kirdyapkina; Marina Pandakova; Sofiya Brodatskaya; Lina Kalutskaya	4:33:11	China (CHN); Hou Yongbo; Yang Jiayu; Yang Mingxia; Liu Huan	4:47:58	Australia (AUS); Rachel Tallent; Stephanie Stigwood; Nicole Fagan	5:06:28
2017	Ukraine (UKR)	5:12:01	China (CHN)	5:19:12	None awarded	
2019	Katie Hayward; Jemima Montag; Philippa Huse; Australia	4:51:36	Olena Sobchuk; Mariya Filiuk; Valentyna Myronchuk; Ukraine	4:58:02	Wang Na; Liu Yu; Su Wenxiu; China	4:59:53

=== Half marathon team ===
Games	Gold		Silver		Bronze	
2011	Japan (JPN); Sayo Nomura; Machiko Iwakawa; Aki Otagiri; Shiho Takechi	3:50:43	China (CHN); Jin Lingling; Jiang Xiaoli; Li Zhenzhu; Jin Yuan; Sun Juan	3:53:09		
2013	Japan (JPN); Ayako Mitsui; Yukiko Okuno; Hitomi Suzuki; Mai Tsuda; Yasuka Ueno	3:40:41	Russia (RUS); Valentina Galimova; Lyudmila Lebedeva; Natalia Novichkova; Alina Prokopeva; Elena Sedova	3:40:49	China (CHN); Zhou Jing; Sun Lamei; Gong Lihua; Mei Ying	3:57:30
2015	Japan (JPN); Nanako Kanno; Ayumi Uehara; Maki Izumida; Sakurako Fukuuchi	3:47:08	China (CHN); Zhang Yingying; Zhang Meixia; Xiao Huinin	3:55:15	Turkey (TUR); Nilay Ersun; Şeyma Yıldız; Yasemin Can; Elif Tozlu; Burcu Büyükbezgin	3:55:36
2017	Japan (JPN)	3:43:35	Turkey (TUR)	3:55:13	Chinese Taipei (TPE)	4:05:52
2019	Yuka Suzuki; Rika Kaseda; Yuki Tagawa; Japan	3:43:18	Li Zhixuan; Zhang Deshun; Jin Mingming; China	3:52:40	Tyler Beling; Lesego Msphe; Rachel Leistra; South Africa	4:19:15

=== 4 × 100 m relay ===
Games	Gold		Silver		Bronze	
1959	Soviet Union (URS); Nelli Yeliseyeva; Larisa Kuleshova; Tamara Makarova; Lyudmila Nechayeva	46.9	Italy (ITA); Anna Doro; Fausta Galluzzi; Giuseppina Leone; Nadia Mecocci	47.5	West Germany (FRG); Ilsabe Heider; Antje Gleichfeld; Kristianne Foss; Inge Fuhrmann	48.1
1961	Soviet Union (URS); Irina Press; Tatyana Shchelkanova; Rimma Koshelyova; Larisa Kuleshova	46.2	Poland (POL); Mirosława Sałacińska; Irena Szczupak; Elżbieta Krzesińska; Barbara Janiszewska	47.6	Bulgaria (BUL); Stefka Ilieva; Diana Yorgova; Svetlana Isaeva; Rossitsa Madzharska	47.9
1963	Soviet Union (URS); Alla Chernyshova; Renāte Lāce; Vera Popkova; Tatyana Shchelkanova	46.5	West Germany (FRG); Bärbel Palmi; Antje Gleichfeld; Elke Masnfeld; Jutta Heine	47.5	Cuba (CUB); Irene Martínez; Fulgencia Romay; Norma Pérez; Miguelina Cobián	47.5
1965	Soviet Union (URS); Lyudmila Samotyosova; Renāte Lāce; Vera Popkova; Tatyana Shchelkanova	45.5	Poland (POL); Irena Kirszenstein; Mirosława Sałacińska; Danuta Straszyńska; Irena Woldańska	46.1	Hungary (HUN); Irén Buskó; Annamária Kovács; Ildikó Jónás; Ida Such	46.4
1967	France (FRA); Anne-Marie Grosse; Françoise Masse; Michèle Alayrangues; Gabrielle Meyer	46.5	Japan (JPN); Miho Sato; Ritsuko Sukegawa; Miyoko Tsujishita; Ayoko Natsume	46.5	West Germany (FRG); Bärbel Palmi; Marlies Fünfstück; Gabriele Großekettler; Gerlinde Beyrichen	46.8
1970	Soviet Union (URS); Lyudmila Zharkowa; Marina Nikiforova; Lyudmila Golomazova; Tatyana Kondrasheva	44.7	Hungary (HUN); Éva Pusztai; Judit Szabóné; Györgyi Balogh; Klára Woth	45.1	West Germany (FRG); Heidi Schüller; Kirsten Roggenkamp; Hannelore Groh; Heide Rosendahl	45.4
1973	Soviet Union (URS); Tatyana Chernikova; Lyudmila Zharkova; Marina Sidorova; Nadezhda Besfamilnaya	43.99	Poland (POL); Ewa Długołęcka; Barbara Bakulin; Urszula Styranka; Maria Żukowska	44.42	East Germany (GDR); Annerose Krumpholz; Ellen Stropahl; Bärbel Struppert; Doris Maletzki	44.44
1975	Soviet Union (URS); Inta Kļimoviča; Tatyana Anisimova; Marina Sidorova; Lyudmila Zharkova	44.77	Poland (POL); Ewa Długołęcka; Aniela Szubert; Barbara Bakulin; Grażyna Rabsztyn	44.87	France (FRA); Cécile Cachera; Danielle Camus; Jacqueline Curtet; Rose-Aimée Bacoul	45.88
1977	Soviet Union (URS); Lyudmila Maslakova; Vera Anisimova; Marina Sidorova; Tatyana Prorochenko	43.16	Bulgaria (BUL); Sofka Popova; Atanaska Georgieva; Ivanka Valkova; Lyubina Dimitrova	44.30	Poland (POL); Bogusława Kaniecka; Helena Fliśnik; Ewa Witkowska; Ewa Długołęcka	44.79
1979	Soviet Union (URS); Vera Komisova; Vera Anisimova; Tatyana Prorochenko; Olga Korotkova	43.14	Great Britain (GBR); Yvette Wray; Kathy Smallwood; Ruth Kennedy; Bev Goddard	43.26	France (FRA); Odile Madkaud; Jacqueline Curtet; Marie-Pierre Philippe; Chantal Réga	43.94
1981	United States (USA); Michelle Glover; Carol Lewis; Jackie Washington; Benita Fitzgerald	43.66	Great Britain (GBR); Yvette Wray; Kathy Smallwood; Sue Hearnshaw; Beverley Goddard	43.86	Italy (ITA); Antonella Capriotti; Carla Mercurio; Patrizia Lombardo; Marisa Masullo	44.43
1983	United States (USA); LaShon Nedd; Jackie Washington; Brenda Cliette; Randy Givens	42.82	Canada (CAN); Angella Taylor; Tanya Brothers; Marita Payne; Molly Killingbeck	43.21	Soviet Union (URS); Marina Romanova; Marina Molokova; Irina Olkhovnikova; Olga Antonova	44.20
1985	United States (USA); Kathrene Wallace; Michelle Finn; Brenda Cliette; Gwen Torrence	43.29	Soviet Union (URS); Nadezhda Korshunova; Marina Molokova; Irina Slyusar; Yelena Vinogradova	43.43	Bulgaria (BUL); Silvia Khristova; Anelia Nuneva; Pepa Pavlova; Ginka Zagorcheva	43.57
1987	United States (USA); Wendy Vereen; Jackie Washington; Dannette Young; Gwen Torrence	42.90	Soviet Union (URS); Nadezhda Roshchupkina; Natalya Pomoshchnikova-Voronova; Yelena Vinogradova; Irina Slyusar	43.17	Nigeria (NGR); Tina Iheagwam; Lynda Eseimokumoh; Mary Onyali; Falilat Ogunkoya	43.71
1989	United States (USA); Michelle Burrell; Anita Howard; LaMonda Miller; Esther Jones	42.40 GR	Soviet Union (URS); Nadezhda Roshchupkina; Galina Malchugina; Tatyana Papilina; Natalya Voronova	43.25	West Germany (FRG); Claudia Zaczkiewicz; Ulrike Sarvari; Karin Janke; Silke-Beate Knoll	43.85
1991	United States (USA); Andrea James; Tamela Saldana; Chryste Gaines; Anita Howard	44.45	Great Britain (GBR); Rachel Kirby; Louise Stuart; Melanie Neef; Christine Bloomfield	44.97	Italy (ITA); Annarita Balzani; Laura Galligani; Cristina Picchi; Lara Sinico	45.24
1993	United States (USA); Crystal Braddock; Cheryl Taplin; Flirtisha Harris; Chryste Gaines	43.37	Nigeria (NGR); Mary Tombiri; Faith Idehen; Christy Opara; Beatrice Utondu	44.25	Canada (CAN); Katie Anderson; Dionne Wright; Dena Burrows; France Gareau	45.20
1995	United States (USA); Cheryl Taplin; Inger Miller; Juan Ball; Kenya Walton	43.58	Russia (RUS); Natalya Anisimova; Oksana Dyachenko; Olga Voronova; Janna Levacheva	44.06	Nigeria (NGR); Ime Akpan; Taiwo Aladefa; Pat Itanyi; Mary Tombiri	44.08
1997	United States (USA); Juan Ball; Melinda Sergent; Andrea Anderson; Passion Richardson	44.04	Russia (RUS); Yekaterina Leshcheva; Irina Korotya; Olga Povtoryova; Natalya Ignatova	44.37	Canada (CAN); Sonia Paquette; Tara Perry; LaDonna Antoine; Karen Clarke	44.59
1999	United States (USA); Angela Williams; Torri Edwards; LaKeisha Backus; Nanceen Perry	43.49	Poland (POL); Agnieszka Rysiukiewicz; Irena Sznajder; Monika Borejza; Zuzanna Radecka	43.74	Germany (GER); Shanta Gosh; Kirsten Bolm; Andrea Bornscheuer; Nicole Mahrarens	43.96
2001	China (CHN); Li Xuemei; Chen Yueqin; Zeng Xiujun; Yan Jiankui	43.72	Brazil (BRA); Lucimar Moura; Maíla Machado; Rosemar Coelho Neto; Maurren Maggi; Maria Laura Almirão	44.13	France (FRA); Katia Benth; Sylvanie Morandais; Céline Thelamon; Reïna-Flor Okori	44.24
2003	China; Chen Lisha; Zhu Juanhong; Ni Xiaoli; Qin Wangping	44.09	France; Céline Thelamon; Aurore Kassambara; Amélie Huyghes; Cécile Sellier	44.68	Brazil; Gilvaneide de Oliveira; Rosemar Coelho Neto; Sônia Ficagna; Thatiana Regina Ignácio	45.79
2005	Russia; Yevgeniya Polyakova, Olga Khalandyreva, Yelena Yakovleva, Yuliya Chermoshanskaya	43.62	France; Natacha Vouaux, Aurore Kassambara, Celine Thelamon, Adrianna Lamalle	43.73	Ireland; Derval O'Rourke, Anna Boyle, Emily Maher, Ailis McSweeney	44.69
2007	Finland; Heidi Hannula, Sari Keskitalo, Ilona Ranta, Johanna Manninen	43.48	Thailand; Sangwan Jaksunin, Orranut Klomdee, Jutamass Tawoncharoen, Nongnuch Sanrat	43.92 SB	Ukraine; Elena Chebanu, Halyna Tonkovyd, Iryna Shtanhyeyeva, Iryna Shepetyuk	43.99
2009	Audrey Alloh; Doris Tomasini; Giulia Arcioni; Maria Aurora Salvagno; Italy	43.83	Ewelina Ptak; Marika Popowicz; Dorota Jędrusińska; Marta Jeschke; Iwona Brzezińska; Poland	43.96	Laetitia Denis; Ayodelé Ikuesan; Amandine Elard; Lucienne M'belu; France	44.31
2011	Ukraine (UKR); Hanna Titimets; Nataliya Pohrebnyak; Khrystyna Stuy; Yelyzaveta Bryzhina	43.33	United States (USA); Lakya Brookins; Shayla Mahan; Christina Manning; Tiffany Townsend	43.48	Jamaica (JAM); Shermaine Williams; Carrie Russell; Anneisha McLaughlin; Anastasia Le-Roy	43.57
2013	Ukraine (UKR); Olesya Povh; Nataliya Pohrebnyak; Mariya Ryemyen; Viktoriya Piatachenko	42.77	United States (USA); Vashti Thomas; Aurieyall Scott; Jade Barber; Tristie Johnson	43.54	Poland (POL); Marika Popowicz; Weronika Wedler; Ewelina Ptak; Małgorzata Kołdej	43.81
2015	Kazakhstan (KAZ); Anastassiya Tulapina; Svetlana Ivanchukova; Yuliya Rakhmanova; Viktoriya Zyabkina	44.28	United States (USA); Ana Holland; Kylie Price; Jade Barber; Nataliyah Friar	44.95	Thailand (THA); Supawan Thaipat; Phensri Chairoek; Tassaporn Wannakit; Khanrutai Pakdee	45.03
2017	Switzerland (SUI); Ajla Del Ponte; Salomé Kora; Cornelia Halbheer; Selina von Jackowski	43.81	Poland (POL); Kamila Ciba; Agata Forkasiewicz; Małgorzata Kołdej; Karolina Zagajewska	44.19	Japan (JPN); Sayaka Takeuchi; Mizuki Nakamura; Ichiko Iki; Miyu Maeyama	44.56 SB
2019	Salomé Kora; Sarah Atcho; Ajla Del Ponte; Samantha Dagry; Riccarda Dietsche; Switzerland	43.72	Abbie Taddeo; Nana Owusu-Afriyie; Riley Day; Celeste Mucci; Australia	43.97	Olivia Eaton; Zoe Hobbs; Georgia Hulls; Natasha Eady; Brooke Somerfield; New Zealand	44.24 NR

=== 4 × 400 m relay ===
Games	Gold		Silver		Bronze	
1981	Soviet Union (URS); Ana Ambrazienė; Irina Baskakova; Natalya Alyoshina; Irina Nazarova	3:26.65	United States (USA); Kelia Bolton; Leann Warren; Robin Campbell; Delisa Walton-Floyd	3:29.50	Romania (ROM); Steluța Vintila; Stela Manea; Ibolya Korodi; Elena Tărîță	3:30.47
1983	Soviet Union (URS); Larisa Krylova; Lyudmila Borisova; Yelena Didilenko; Mariya Pinigina	3:24.97 UR	Canada (CAN); Charmaine Crooks; Jillian Richardson; Molly Killingbeck; Marita Payne	3:25.26	United States (USA); Kelia Bolton; Easter Gabriel; Sharon Dabney; Arlise Emerson	3:34.64
1985	Soviet Union (URS); Margarita Navickaitė; Nadezhda Zvyagintseva; Yelena Korban; Tatyana Alekseyeva	3:25.96	Canada (CAN); Charmaine Crooks; Esmie Lawrence; Camille Cato; Molly Killingbeck	3:29.06	United States (USA); Susan Shurr; Sharon Dabney; Tanya McIntosh; Joetta Clark	3:30.41
1987	United States (USA); Sonia Fridy; Denise Mitchell; Rochelle Stevens; Denean Howard	3:27.16	Soviet Union (URS); Yelena Vinogradova; Tatyana Ledovskaya; Larisa Lesnykh; Lyudmyla Dzhyhalova	3:27.65	Nigeria (NGR); Sadia Sowunmi; Kehinde Vaughan; Airat Bakare; Maria Usifo	3:33.37
1989	United States (USA); Celena Mondie-Milner; Natasha Kaiser-Brown; Jearl Miles; Terri Dendy	3:26.48	West Germany (FRG); Linda Kisabaka; Karin Janke; Gabriela Lesch; Helga Arendt	3:27.02	Soviet Union (URS); Yelena Vinogradova; Margarita Ponomaryova; Yelena Golesheva; Lyudmyla Dzhyhalova	3:28.60
1991	United States (USA); Keisha Demas; Tasha Downing; Teri Smith; Maicel Malone	3:27.93	Soviet Union (URS); Yelena Golesheva; Inna Yevseyeva; Galina Moskvina; Anna Knoroz	3:29.64	Poland (POL); Barbara Grzywocz; Agata Sadurska; Monika Warnicka; Sylwia Pachut	3:35.03
1993	United States (USA); Crystal Irving; Maicel Malone; Youlanda Warren; Michelle Collins	3:26.18	Cuba (CUB); Nancy McLeón; Yudalis Limonta; Idalmis Bonne; Oraidis Ramirez	3:28.95	Nigeria (NGR); Onyinye Chikezie; Omotayo Akinremi; Olabisi Afolabi; Omolade Akinremi	3:34.97
1995	Russia (RUS); Yuliya Sotnikova; Natalya Khrushcheleva; Yelena Andreyeva; Tatyana Chebykina	3:28.32	United States (USA); Nicole Green; Camara Jones; Janeen Jones; Youlanda Warren	3:30.25	Ukraine (UKR); Viktoriya Fomenko; Svetlana Tverdokhleb; Tatyana Movchan; Olena Rurak	3:30.57
1997	Russia (RUS); Natalya Sharova; Svetlana Goncharenko; Yekaterina Bakhvalova; Olga Kotlyarova	3:27.93	Cuba (CUB); Nancy McLeón; Julia Duporty; Daimí Pernía; Idalmis Bonne	3:29.00	Great Britain (GBR); Vicki Jamison; Michelle Pierre; Michelle Thomas; Allison Curbishley	3:30.57
1999	United States (USA); Yolanda Brown-Moore; Yulanda Nelson; Mikele Barber; Suziann Reid	3:27.97	Russia (RUS); Natalya Khrushcheleva; Yuliya Taranova; Olga Salnykova; Anna Tkach	3:30.54	Great Britain (GBR); Tasha Danvers; Dawn Higgins; Lee McConnell; Sinead Dudgeon	3:32.25
2001	United States (USA); Me'Lisa Barber; Carolyn Jackson; Demetria Washington; Mikele Barber	3:28.04	Great Britain (GBR); Tracey Duncan; Jenny Meadows; Tasha Danvers; Lee McConnell	3:30.40	Belarus (BLR); Sviatlana Usovich; Natallia Safronnikava; Hanna Kazak; Iryna Khliustava	3:30.65
2003	Russia; Yekaterina Kondratyeva, Tatyana Firova, Natalya Lavshuk, Mariya Lisnichenko	3:31.63	Poland; Marta Chrust, Ewelina Sętowska, Joanna Buza, Anna Zagórska	3:38.17	Germany; Anja Neupert, Katja Keller, Annika Meyer, Maren Schott	3:38.87
2005	Russia; Anastasia Ovchinnikova, Natalya Ivanova, Yelena Migunova, Natalya Nazarova	3:27.47	Poland; Monika Bejnar, Ewelina Sętowska, Marta Chrust, Grażyna Prokopek	3:27.71	Ukraine; Antonina Yefremova, Olga Zangorodnya, Nataliya Pyhyda, Liliya Pilyugina	3:28.23
2007	Ukraine; Nataliya Pyhyda, Antonina Yefremova, Olha Zavhorodnya, Oksana Shcherbak	3:29.59	Russia; Olga Shulikova, Elena Voinova, Anastasia Kochetove, Ksenia Zadorina	3:30.49	Great Britain; Kelly Massey, Laura Finucane, Kadi-Ann Thomas, Faye Harding	3:33.70
2009	Carline Muir; Amonn Nelson; Kimberly Hyacinthe; Esther Akinsulie; Canada	3:33.09	Ekaterina Voronenkova; Alexandra Zaytseva; Nadezda Sozontova; Ekaterina Vukolova; Russia	3:34.45	Ndeye Fatouseck Soumah; Mame Fatou Faye; Fatou Diabaye; Fatou Bintou Fall; Senegal	3:36.33
2011	Russia (RUS); Marina Karnaushchenko; Yelena Migunova; Kseniya Ustalova; Olga Topilskaya	3:27.16	Turkey (TUR); Nagihan Karadere; Merve Aydın; Meliz Redif; Pınar Saka	3:30.14	Great Britain (GBR); Kelly Lorraine Massey; Charlotte Anne Best; Meghan Beesley; Emily Diamond	3:33.09
2013	Russia (RUS); Alyona Tamkova; Nadezhda Kotlyarova; Ekaterina Renzhina; Kseniya Ustalova	3:26.61	Canada (CAN); Noelle Montcalm; Sarah Wells; Helen Crofts; Alicia Brown	3:32.93	South Africa (RSA); Sonja van der Merwe; Arista Nienaber; Justine Palframan; Anneri Ebersohn	3:36.05
2015	Poland (POL); Małgorzata Hołub; Monika Szczęsna; Joanna Linkiewicz; Justyna Święty	3:31.98	Russia (RUS); Liliya Gafiyatullina; Kristina Malvinova; Irina Takuncheva; Yelena Zuykevich	3:32.46	United States (USA); Akeyla Mitchell; Madeline Kopp; Kimberly Mackay; Alissa Martinez	3:37.20
2017	Poland (POL); Małgorzata Hołub-Kowalik; Iga Baumgart; Patrycja Wyciszkiewicz; Justyna Święty-Ersetic; Aleksandra Gaworska*; Martyna Dąbrowska*	3:26.75	Mexico (MEX); Dania Aguillón; Natali Brito; Leticia Cook; Paola Morán	3:33.98 SB	Romania (ROU); Anamaria Nesteriuc; Sanda Belgyan; Camelia Gal; Bianca Răzor	3:34.16
2019	Mariia Mykolenko; Anastasiia Holienieva; Kateryna Klymiuk; Tetyana Melnyk; Ukraine	3:30.82	Frida Corona; Dania Aguillón; Rosa Cook; Paola Morán; Mexico	3:32.63	Genevieve Cowie; Morgan Mitchell; Jessie Stafford; Gabriella O'Grady; Australia	3:34.01

=== High jump ===
Games	Gold		Silver		Bronze	
1959	Iolanda Balaș (ROM)	1.80	Valentina Ballod (URS)	1.73	Jarosława Jóźwiakowska (POL)	1.61
1961	Iolanda Balaș (ROM)	1.85	Klara Pushkaryeva (URS)	1.67	Thelma Hopkins (GBR)	1.65
1963	Taisiya Chenchik (URS)	1.72	Susan Dennler (GBR)	1.67	Heidemarie Hummel (FRG)	1.65
1965	Yordanka Blagoeva (BUL)	1.65	Klara Pushkaryeva (URS)	1.65	Nevenka Mrinjek (YUG)	1.63
1967	Mami Takeda (JPN)	1.68	Linda Knowles (GBR)	1.68	Liese Prokop (AUT)	1.68
1970	Snežana Hrepevnik (YUG)	1.86	Cornelia Popescu (ROM)	1.83	Ilona Gusenbauer (AUT)	1.83
1973	Virginia Ioan (ROM)	1.84	Jutta Kirst (GDR)	1.84	Galina Filatova (URS); Sara Simeoni (ITA)	1.81
1975	Galina Filatova (URS)	1.88	Sara Simeoni (ITA)	1.88	Alla Fedorchuk (URS)	1.86
1977	Sara Simeoni (ITA)	1.92	Debbie Brill (CAN)	1.90	Tatyana Boyko (URS)	1.86
1979	Andrea Mátay (HUN)	1.94	Ulrike Meyfarth (FRG)	1.92	Sara Simeoni (ITA)	1.92
1981	Sara Simeoni (ITA)	1.96 m GR	Lyudmila Andonova (BUL)	1.94 m	Tamara Bykova (URS)	1.94 m
1983	Tamara Bykova (URS)	1.98 UR	Silvia Costa (CUB)	1.98 UR	Maryse Éwanjé-Épée (FRA)	1.92
1985	Silvia Costa (CUB)	2.01	Lyudmila Petrus (URS)	1.93	Danuta Bułkowska (POL)	1.91
1987	Svetlana Leseva (BUL)	1.95	Natalya Golodnova (URS)	1.91	Megumi Sato (JPN)	1.88
1989	Alina Astafei (ROM)	1.91 m	Silvia Costa (CUB)	1.91 m	Jin Ling (CHN)	1.88 m
1991	Alison Inverarity (AUS)	1.92 m	Svetlana Lavrova (URS)	1.92 m	Tisha Waller (USA)	1.90 m
1993	Tanya Hughes (USA)	1.95 m	Nelė Žilinskienė (LTU)	1.95 m	Larisa Hryhorenko (UKR)	1.95 m
1995	Viktoriya Fyodorova (RUS)	1.92 m	Svetlana Zalevskaya (KAZ)	1.92 m	Natalja Jonckheere (BEL)	1.88 m
1997	Amy Acuff (USA)	1.98	Monica Iagăr (ROM)	1.96	Marie Collonvillé (FRA)	1.94
1999	Monica Iagăr (ROM)	1.95	Svetlana Lapina (RUS)	1.93	Solange Witteveen (ARG)	1.93
2001	Vita Palamar (UKR)	1.96	Nicole Forrester (CAN)	1.94	Nevena Lenđel (CRO)	1.91
2003	Dóra Győrffy; Hungary	1.94	Anna Ksok; Poland	1.94	Yelena Slesarenko; Russia	1.94
2005	Anna Chicherova; Russia	1.90	Iryna Kovalenko; Ukraine	1.88	Ariane Friedrich; Germany	1.88
2007	Marina Aitova; Kazakhstan	1.92	Ariane Friedrich; Germany	1.90	Anna Ustinova; Kazakhstan	1.90
2009	Ariane Friedrich; Germany	2.00	Yekaterina Yevseyeva; Kazakhstan	1.91	Julia Wanner; Germany	1.91
2011	Brigetta Barrett; United States	1.96 PB	Airinė Palšytė; Lithuania	1.96 =NR	Anna Iljuštšenko; Estonia	1.94
2013	Kamila Stepaniuk; Poland	1.96	Mariya Kuchina; Russia	1.96 PB	Anna Iljuštšenko; Estonia	1.94 SB
2015	Airinė Palšytė; Lithuania	1.84 m	Elisabeth Boyer; United States; Madara Onužāne; Latvia	1.80 m		
2017	Oksana Okunyeva; Ukraine	1.97 m =SB	Iryna Herashchenko; Ukraine	1.91 m	Airinė Palšytė; Lithuania	1.91 m
2019	Yuliya Chumachenko; Ukraine	1.94 m PB	Iryna Herashchenko; Ukraine	1.91 m	Imke Onnen; Germany	1.91 m

=== Pole vault ===
Games	Gold		Silver		Bronze	
1997	Emma George (AUS)	4.40	Cai Weiyan (CHN)	4.30	Doris Auer (AUT)	4.10
1999	Pavla Hamácková (CZE)	4.25	Monique de Wilt (NED)	4.20	Dana Cervantes (ESP)	4.10
2001	Gao Shuying (CHN)	4.52 UR	Sabine Schulte (GER)	4.35	Šárka Mládková (CZE)	4.20
2003	Tatyana Polnova; Russia	4.70 CR	Anastasiya Ivanova; Russia	4.40	Nadine Rohr; Switzerland	4.25
2005	Julia Hütter; Germany	4.25	Nadine Rohr; Switzerland	4.20	Dimitra Emmanouil; Greece	4.20
2007	Aleksandra Kiryashova; Russia	4.40	Kristina Gadschiew; Germany	4.40	Nicole Büchler; Switzerland	4.35 PB
2009	Jiřina Ptáčníková; Czech Republic	4.55	Nicole Büchler; Switzerland	4.50	Kristina Gadschiew; Germany	4.50
2011	Aleksandra Kiryashova; Russia	4.65 =PB	Tina Šutej; Slovenia	4.55	Katerina Stefanidi; Greece	4.45 =PB
2013	Anastasia Savchenko; Russia	4.60	Martina Schultze; Germany	4.40 PB	Fanny Smets; Belgium	4.30 PB
2015	Li Ling; China	4.45 m	Eliza McCartney; New Zealand	4.40 m SB	Chloé Henry; Belgium	4.40 m SB
2017	Iryna Zhuk; Belarus	4.40 m	Annika Roloff; Germany	4.40 m	Marta Onofre; Portugal	4.40 m SB
2019	Roberta Bruni; Italy	4.46 m PB	Rachel Baxter; United States	4.41 m	Bridget Guy; United States	4.31 m

=== Long jump ===
Games	Gold		Silver		Bronze	
1959	Elżbieta Krzesińska (POL)	5.94	Tamara Makarova (URS)	5.76	Larisa Kuleshova (URS)	5.71
1961	Tatyana Shchelkanova (URS)	6.49	Diana Yorgova (BUL)	6.12	Elżbieta Krzesińska (POL)	6.11
1963	Tatyana Shchelkanova (URS)	6.48	Vlasta Přikrylová (TCH)	5.71	Bärbel Palmié (FRG)	5.63
1965	Tatyana Shchelkanova (URS)	6.42	Viorica Viscopoleanu (ROM)	6.18	Dorothee Sander (FRG)	5.98
1967	Sheila Parkin (GBR)	6.32	Bärbel Palmié (FRG)	6.17	Anne-Marie Grosse (FRA)	5.96
1970	Heide Rosendahl (FRG)	6.84	Elena Vintilă (ROM)	6.35	Hiroko Yamashita (JPN)	6.17
1973	Margrit Olfert (GDR)	6.63	Margarita Treinytė (URS)	6.51	Brenda Eisler (CAN)	6.48
1975	Jarmila Nygrýnová (TCH)	6.48	Dorina Catineanu (ROM)	6.34	Alina Gheorghiu (ROM)	6.32
1977	Jacqueline Curtet (FRA)	6.38	Jarmila Nygrýnová (TCH)	6.35	Jodi Anderson (USA)	6.35
1979	Anita Stukāne (URS)	6.80	Jodi Anderson (USA)	6.67	Tetyana Skachko (URS)	6.57
1981	Tatyana Kolpakova (URS)	6.83 m	Anişoara Cuşmir (ROM)	6.77 m	Vali Ionescu (ROM)	6.61 m
1983	Anişoara Cuşmir (ROU)	7.06w	Svetlana Zorina (URS)	6.81	Vali Ionescu (ROU)	6.56w
1985	Irina Valyukevich (URS)	7.04	Silvia Khristova (BUL)	6.62	Marieta Ilcu (ROM)	6.61
1987	Marieta Ilcu (ROM)	6.81	Ljudmila Ninova (BUL)	6.78	Heike Grabe (GDR)	6.74
1989	Yolanda Chen (URS)	6.72 m	Marieta Ilcu (ROM)	6.71 m	Katja Trostel (GDR)	6.49 m
1991	Inessa Kravets (URS)	6.87 m	Fiona May (GBR)	6.67 m	Olena Khlopotnova (URS)	6.66 m (w)
1993	Mirela Dulgheru (ROM)	6.69 m (w)	Vanessa Monar-Enweani (CAN)	6.57 m (w)	Daphne Saunders (BAH)	6.53 m
1995	Viktoriya Vershynina (UKR)	6.76 m	Sharon Jaklofsky (NED)	6.74 m	Lyudmila Galkina (RUS)	6.55 m
1997	Olena Shekhovtsova (UKR)	6.78	Viktoriya Vershynina (UKR)	6.44	Cristina Nicolau (ROM)	6.40
1999	Olena Shekhovtsova (UKR)	6.92	Adrien Sawyer (USA)	6.61	Maurren Maggi (BRA)	6.58
2001	Maurren Maggi (BRA)	6.83	Guan Yingnan (CHN)	6.56	Kumiko Ikeda (JPN)	6.52
2003	Irina Simagina; Russia	6.49	Alina Militaru; Romania	6.45	Zita Ajkler; Hungary	6.38
2005	Lyudmila Kolchanova; Russia	6.79	Naide Gomes; Portugal	6.56	Natalya Lebusova; Russia	6.51
2007	Olga Rypakova; Kazakhstan	6.85 SB	Yelena Sokolova; Russia	6.61	Stiliani Pilatou; Greece	6.52
2009	Ivana Španović; Serbia	6.64	Irina Kryachkova; Russia	6.47	Ruky Abdulai; Canada	6.44
2011	Anna Nazarova; Russia	6.72	Yuliya Pidluzhnaya; Russia	6.56	Melanie Bauschke; Germany	6.51
2013	Darya Klishina; Russia	6.90	Yelena Sokolova; Russia	6.73	Michelle Weitzel; Germany	6.56
2015	Yuliya Pidluzhnaya; Russia	6.79 m SB	Anna Jagaciak; Poland	6.57 m SB	Naa Anang; Australia	6.55 m PB
2017	Alina Rotaru; Romania	6.65 m	Nektaria Panagi; Cyprus	6.42 m	Anna Bühler; Germany	6.38 m
2019	Maryna Bekh-Romanchuk; Ukraine	6.84 m	Evelise Veiga; Portugal	6.61 m	Florentina Iusco; Romania	6.55 m

=== Triple jump ===
Games	Gold		Silver		Bronze	
1991	Li Huirong (CHN)	14.20 m GR	Yelena Semiraz (URS)	13.75 m	Li Jing (CHN)	13.63 m (w)
1993	Niurka Montalvo (CUB)	14.16 m (w)	Šárka Kašpárková (CZE)	14.00 m (w)	Monica Toth (ROM)	13.96 m (w)
1995	Šárka Kašpárková (CZE)	14.20 m GR=	Lyudmila Dubkova (RUS)	13.87 m	Barbara Lah (ITA)	13.85 m
1997	Olena Hovorova (UKR)	14.23	Olga Cepero (CUB)	14.12	Zhanna Gureyeva (BLR)	13.93
1999	Olena Hovorova (UKR)	14.99w	Wu Lingmei (CHN)	14.55w	Adelina Gavrilă (ROM)	14.33
2001	Tatyana Lebedeva (RUS)	14.81 UR	Natallia Safronava (BLR)	14.57	Yelena Oleynikova (RUS)	14.39w
2003	Oksana Rogova; Russia	14.16	Viktoriya Gurova; Russia	14.14	Mariana Solomon; Romania	14.09
2005	Wang Ying; China	14.12	Olha Saladukha; Ukraine	13.96	Nadezhda Bazenova; Russia	13.90
2007	Olha Saladukha; Ukraine	14.79 PB	Dana Velďáková; Slovakia	14.41 PB	Yarianna Martínez; Cuba	14.25
2009	Yarianna Martínez; Cuba	14.40	Natalya Kutyakova; Russia	14.14	Anastasia Matveeva; Russia	13.94
2011	Ekaterina Koneva; Russia	14.25 PB	Patrícia Mamona; Portugal	14.23	Cristina Bujin; Romania	14.21
2013	Ekaterina Koneva; Russia	14.82 UR	Anna Jagaciak; Poland	14.21	Carmen Toma; Romania	14.14
2015	Ekaterina Koneva; Russia	14.60 m	Jenny Elbe; Germany	13.86 m	Anna Jagaciak; Poland	13.81 m
2017	Neele Eckhardt; Germany	13.91 m	Fu Luna; China	13.59 m PB	Māra Grīva; Latvia	13.58 m SB
2019	Olha Korsun; Ukraine	13.90 m PB	Evelise Veiga; Portugal	13.81 m	Neja Filipič; Slovenia	13.73 m

=== Shot put ===
Games	Gold		Silver		Bronze	
1959	Lidia Sharamovich (BUL)	13.97	Milena Usenik (YUG)	13.90	Antonia Vehoff (FRG)	13.11
1961	Tamara Press (URS)	17.12	Irina Press (URS)	15.61	Ana Roth (ROM)	15.59
1963	Tamara Press (URS)	17.29	Judit Bognár (HUN)	15.47	Jolán Kleiber-Kontsek (HUN)	14.75
1965	Tamara Press (URS)	18.31	Nadezhda Chizhova (URS)	17.27	Judit Bognár (HUN)	15.37
1967	Liesel Westermann (FRG)	15.30	Ryoko Sugiyama (JPN)	15.04	Brigitte Berendonk (FRG)	14.36
1970	Nadezhda Chizhova (URS)	19.51	Hannelore Friedel (GDR)	17.84	Ingeburg Friedrich (GDR)	17.03
1973	Nadezhda Chizhova (URS)	20.82 UR	Elena Stoyanova (BUL)	18.64	Faina Melnik (URS)	18.31
1975	Elena Stoyanova (BUL)	18.99	Mihaela Loghin (ROM)	18.21	Rima Makauskaitė (URS)	18.06
1977	Elena Stoyanova (BUL)	19.98	Nina Isayeva (URS)	19.56	Helma Knorscheidt (GDR)	19.29
1979	Ilona Slupianek (GDR)	19.98	Helma Knorscheidt (GDR)	19.56	Mihaela Loghin (ROM)	19.41
1981	Helma Knorscheidt (GDR)	20.24 m	Ines Müller (GDR)	19.66 m	Lyudmila Savina (URS)	18.50 m
1983	Natalya Lisovskaya (URS)	20.46	Claudia Losch (FRG)	18.81	Natalya Akhrimenko (URS)	18.67
1985	Natalya Lisovskaya (URS)	20.47	Yang Yanqin (CHN)	17.79	Ramona Pagel (USA)	17.46
1987	Natalya Lisovskaya (URS)	20.48	Kathrin Neimke (GDR)	20.07	Larisa Peleshenko (URS)	19.49
1989	Huang Zhihong (CHN)	20.56 m	Belsy Laza (CUB)	19.32 m	Zhou Tianhua (CHN)	18.71 m
1991	Svetlana Krivelyova (URS)	19.62 m	Zhou Tianhua (CHN)	19.23 m	Agnes Deselaers (GER)	17.32 m
1993	Zhou Tianhua (CHN)	19.17 m	Belsy Laza (CUB)	18.48 m	Katrin Koch (GER)	16.70 m
1995	Wu Xianchun (CHN)	18.31 m	Cheng Xiaoyan (CHN)	17.95 m	Corrie de Bruin (NED)	17.82 m
1997	Irina Korzhanenko (RUS)	19.39	Corrie de Bruin (NED)	18.65	Tressa Thompson (USA)	18.26
1999	Yumileidi Cumbá (CUB)	18.70	Song Feina (CHN)	18.28	Elisângela Adriano (BRA)	18.17
2001	Yumileidi Cumbá (CUB)	18.90	Lee Myung-sun (KOR)	18.79	Katarzyna Żakowicz (POL)	18.31
2003	Li Fengfeng; China	18.55	Lee Myung-sun; South Korea	17.58	Yelena Ivanenko; Belarus	17.29
2005	Natallia Khoroneko; Belarus	18.86	Li Meiju; China	18.48	Misleydis González; Cuba	18.26
2007	Irina Tarasova; Russia	17.46	Yuliya Leantsiuk; Belarus	17.20	Magdalena Sobieszek; Poland	16.88
2009	Mailín Vargas; Cuba	18.91	Chiara Rosa; Italy	18.21	Alena Kopets; Belarus	17.48
2011	Irina Tarasova; Russia	18.02	Sophie Kleeberg; Germany	17.48	Meng Qianqian; China	17.21
2013	~~Irina Tarasova~~; ~~Russia~~	DQ (Doping)~~18.75~~	Liu Xiangrong; China	18.58	Natalia Ducó; Chile	17.96
2015	Lena Urbaniak; Germany	18.00 m PB	Paulina Guba; Poland	17.94 m PB	Brittany Crew; Canada	17.27 m PB
2017	Brittany Crew; Canada	18.34 m	Klaudia Kardasz; Poland	17.90 m PB	Paulina Guba; Poland	17.76 m
2019	Sarah Mitton; Canada	18.31 m	Portious Warren; Trinidad and Tobago	17.82 m	Klaudia Kardasz; Poland	17.65 m

=== Discus ===
Games	Gold		Silver		Bronze	
1959	Györgyi Hegedus (HUN)	46.76	Elivia Ricci (ITA)	45.56	Ida Bucsányi (HUN)	43.38
1961	Tamara Press (URS)	58.06	Antonina Zolotukhina (URS)	53.82	Jolán Kontsek (HUN)	52.51
1963	Tamara Press (URS)	55.90	Jolán Kleiber-Kontsek (HUN)	50.92	Judit Bognár (HUN)	49.73
1965	Jolán Kleiber-Kontsek (HUN)	55.66	Judit Stugner (HUN)	55.14	Tamara Press (URS)	53.62
1967	Liesel Westermann (FRG)	59.22	Brigitte Berendonk (FRG)	53.16	Iris Malnig (AUT)	46.16
1970	Karin Illgen (GDR)	62.04	Brigitte Berendonk (FRG)	56.78	Liesel Westermann (FRG)	56.46
1973	Faina Melnik (URS)	64.54	Argentina Menis (ROM)	63.92	Nadezhda Sergeyeva (URS)	59.26
1975	Mariya Vergova (BUL)	65.28	Argentina Menis (ROM)	64.28	Radostina Bakhchevanova (BUL)	56.96
1977	Mariya Vergova (BUL)	66.34	Svetlana Melnikova (URS)	61.78	Radostina Bakhchevanova (BUL)	61.08
1979	Svetlana Melnikova (URS)	63.54	Evelin Jahl (GDR)	63.00	Florenţa Ţacu (ROM)	59.28
1981	Florența Crăciunescu (ROM)	67.48 m GR	Petra Sziegaud (GDR)	64.14 m	Mariana Lengyel (ROM)	61.84 m
1983	Florența Crăciunescu (ROU)	64.56	Natalya Akhrimenko (URS)	62.62	Lyubov Urakova (URS)	58.28
1985	Maritza Martén (CUB)	66.66	Tsvetanka Khristova (BUL)	65.30	Daniela Costian (ROM)	63.20
1987	Tsvetanka Khristova (BUL)	67.96	Gabriele Reinsch (GDR)	64.12	Hou Xuemei (CHN)	64.04
1989	Hou Xuemei (CHN)	65.32 m	Gabriele Reinsch (GDR)	65.20 m	Maritza Martén (CUB)	64.70 m
1991	Xiao Yanling (CHN)	64.36 m	Qiu Qiaoping (CHN)	62.40 m	Antonina Patoka (URS)	62.22 m
1993	Renata Katewicz (POL)	62.40 m	Jackie McKernan (GBR)	60.72 m	Anja Gündler (GER)	60.56 m
1995	Natalya Sadova (RUS)	62.92 m	Anja Gündler (GER)	60.78 m	Bao Dongying (CHN)	59.30 m
1997	Natalya Sadova (RUS)	67.02	Hu Honglian (CHN)	61.00	Nicoleta Grasu (ROM)	60.08
1999	Nicoleta Grasu (ROM)	65.21	Joanna Wiśniewska (POL)	63.97	Elisângela Adriano (BRA)	62.23
2001	Li Qiumei (CHN)	61.66	Li Yanfeng (CHN)	60.50	Mélina Robert-Michon (FRA)	58.04
2003	Natalya Fokina; Ukraine	63.11	Li Yanfeng; China	61.12	Xu Shaoyang; China	58.64
2005	Wioletta Potępa; Poland	62.10	Song Aimin; China	61.74	Dragana Tomašević; Serbia and Montenegro	59.92
2007	Yarelys Barrios; Cuba	61.36	Dani Samuels; Australia	60.47 SB	Dragana Tomašević; Serbia	56.82
2009	Dani Samuels; Australia	62.48	Żaneta Glanc; Poland	60.57	Kateryna Karsak; Ukraine	60.47
2011	Żaneta Glanc; Poland	63.99 PB	Zinaida Sendriūtė; Lithuania	62.49 PB	Svetlana Saykina; Russia	60.81
2013	Vera Ganeeva; Russia	61.26	Yelena Panova; Russia	56.86	Maryke Oberholzer; South Africa	54.09
2015	Yuliya Maltseva; Russia	59.37 m	Marike Steinacker; Germany	58.83 m	Stefania Strumillo; Italy	58.22 m PB
2017	Kristin Pudenz; Germany	59.09 m	Valarie Allman; United States	58.36 m	Taryn Gollshewsky; Australia	58.11 m
2019	Daisy Osakue; Italy	61.69 m PB	Claudine Vita; Germany	61.52 m	Ieva Zarankaitė; Lithuania	56.75 m

=== Hammer throw ===
Games	Gold		Silver		Bronze	
1997	Mihaela Melinte (ROM)	69.84	Olga Kuzenkova (RUS)	65.96	Deborah Sosimenko (AUS)	65.02
1999	Mihaela Melinte (ROM)	74.24	Lyudmila Gubkina (BLR)	68.27	Manuela Montebrun (FRA)	68.11
2001	Manuela Montebrun (FRA)	69.78	Yipsi Moreno (CUB)	68.39	Lyudmila Gubkina (BLR)	67.97
2003	Liu Yinghui; China	69.05	Gulfiya Khanafeyeva; Russia	65.12	Agnieszka Pogroszewska; Poland	64.27
2005	Kamila Skolimowska; Poland	72.75	Liu Yinghui; China	72.51	Ester Balassini; Italy	70.13
2007	Darya Pchelnik; Belarus	68.74	Eileen O'Keeffe; Ireland	68.46	Lenka Ledvinová; Czech Republic	66.41
2009	Betty Heidler; Germany	75.83 UR	Martina Hrašnová; Slovakia	72.85	Kathrin Klaas; Germany	70.97
2011	Zalina Marghieva; Moldova	72.93 NR	Éva Orbán; Hungary	71.33 NR	Bianca Perie; Romania	71.18
2013	Jeneva McCall; United States	73.75	Oksana Kondratyeva; Russia	72.22	Zalina Marghieva; Moldova	71.10
2015	Hanna Skydan; Azerbaijan	70.67 m	Joanna Fiodorow; Poland	69.69 m	Julia Ratcliffe; New Zealand	67.54 m
2017	Malwina Kopron; Poland	76.85 m UR, PB	Hanna Malyshchyk; Belarus	74.93 m	Joanna Fiodorow; Poland	71.33 m
2019	Iryna Klymets; Ukraine	71.25 m	Malwina Kopron; Poland	70.89 m	Katarzyna Furmanek; Poland	69.68 m PB

=== Javelin ===
Games	Gold		Silver		Bronze	
1959	Elvīra Ozoliņa (URS)	49.95	Urszula Figwer (POL)	47.02	Maria Diţi (ROM)	46.86
1961	Yelena Gorchakova (URS)	51.39	Maria Diaconescu (ROM)	50.64	Almut Brömmel (FRG)	47.65
1963	Almut Brömmel (FRG)	49.61	Elvīra Ozoliņa (URS)	47.00	Barbara Decker (FRG)	43.91
1965	Mihaela Peneș (ROM)	59.22	Michèle Demys (FRA)	52.71	Valentina Popova (URS)	52.65
1967	RaNae Bair (USA)	52.98	Sakiko Hara (JPN)	48.38	Michèle Demys (FRA)	48.20
1970	Daniela Jaworska (POL)	56.16	Magda Vidos (HUN)	50.60	Valentyna Evert (URS)	50.00
1973	Svetlana Korolyova (URS)	62.00	Kate Schmidt (USA)	60.34	Lyutviyan Mollova (BUL)	59.04
1975	Nadezhda Yakubovich (URS)	61.72	Kate Schmidt (USA)	60.36	Éva Zörgő (ROM)	59.50
1977	Nadezhda Yakubovich (URS)	61.42	Ivanka Vancheva (BUL)	61.12	Aranka Vágási (HUN)	61.12
1979	Éva Ráduly-Zörgő (ROM)	67.20	Ivanka Vancheva (BUL)	63.04	Mayra Vila (CUB)	60.98
1981	Petra Felke (GDR)	65.20 m	Karin Smith (USA)	64.12 m	Mayra Vila (CUB)	63.88 m
1983	Beate Peters (FRG)	66.86	Fausta Quintavalla (ITA)	63.06	Mayra Vila (CUB)	62.34
1985	Ivonne Leal (CUB)	71.82	Beate Peters (FRG)	63.70	María Caridad Colón (CUB)	62.46
1987	Irina Kostyuchenkova (URS)	66.72	Susanne Jung (GDR)	65.36	Brigitte Graune (FRG)	61.24
1989	Silke Renk (GDR)	66.09 m	Brigitte Graune (FRG)	62.13 m	Päivi Alafrantti (FIN)	61.75 m
1991	Tatyana Shikolenko (URS)	63.56 m	Isel López (CUB)	62.32 m	Paula Berry (USA)	58.28 m
1993	Lee Young-sun (KOR)	58.62 m	Tanja Damaske (GER)	57.68 m	Valerie Tulloch (CAN)	56.52 m
1995	Felicia Ţilea (ROM)	62.16 m	Claudia Isăilă (ROM)	61.74 m	Lee Young-sun (KOR)	61.62 m
1997	Isel López (CUB)	64.30	Sonia Bisset (CUB)	63.46	Karen Forkel (GER)	60.70
1999	Ewa Rybak (POL)	60.76 UR	Evfemija Štorga (SLO)	59.30	Yanuris la Motaña (CUB)	59.08
2001	Osleidys Menéndez (CUB)	69.82 UR	Nikola Tomecková (CZE)	62.20	Wei Jianhua (CHN)	57.84
2003	Barbara Madejczyk; Poland	56.23	Christina Scherwin; Denmark	56.08	Mercedes Chilla; Spain	55.94
2005	Barbora Špotáková; Czech Republic	60.73	Ma Ning; China	59.18	Justine Robbeson; South Africa	58.70
2007	Buoban Pamang; Thailand	61.40 NR	Monica Stoian; Romania	61.19 PB	Urszula Jasińska; Poland	60.63
2009	Sunette Viljoen; South Africa	62.52	Vera Rebrik; Ukraine	61.02	Mareike Rittweg; Germany	59.44
2011	Sunette Viljoen; South Africa	66.47 AR	Marina Maximova; Russia	59.87	Justine Robbeson; South Africa	59.78
2013	Mariya Abakumova; Russia	65.12	Viktoriya Sudarushkina; Russia	62.68	Elisabeth Eberl; Austria	55.02
2015	Tatsiana Khaladovich; Belarus	60.45 m	Līna Mūze; Latvia	60.26 m	Irena Šedivá; Czech Republic	59.89 m PB
2017	Marcelina Witek; Poland	63.31 m PB	Marina Saito; Japan	62.37 m PB	Jenni Kangas; Finland	60.98 m PB
2019	Liveta Jasiūnaitė; Lithuania	60.36 m	Haruka Kitaguchi; Japan	60.15 m	Eda Tuğsuz; Turkey	59.75 m

=== Pentathlon ===
Games	Gold		Silver		Bronze	
1965	Tatyana Shchelkanova (URS)	4802	Annamária Kovács (HUN)	4606	Yelena Kolnich (URS)	4479
1967	Liese Prokop (AUT)	4465	Michiko Okamoto (JPN)	4355	Pirkko Heikkilä (FIN)	4274
1970	Tatyana Kondrashova (URS)	4884	Nedyalka Angelova (BUL)	4859	Mieke Sterk (NED)	4828
1973	Nadiya Tkachenko (URS)	4629	Tatyana Vorokhobko (URS)	4444	Diane Jones (CAN)	4370
1975	Jane Frederick (USA)	4442	Đurđa Fočić (YUG)	4423	Olga Rukavishnikova (URS)	4313
1977	Valentina Dimitrova (BUL)	4630	Jane Frederick (USA)	4625	Yekaterina Smirnova (URS)	4521
1979	Yekaterina Smirnova (URS)	4497	Sylvia Barlag (NED)	4306	Ina Losch (FRG)	4272

=== Heptathlon ===
Games	Gold		Silver		Bronze	
1981	Małgorzata Guzowska (POL)	6198 pts	Nadezhda Vinogradova (URS)	6133 pts	Corina Tifrea (ROM)	6033 pts
1983	Yekaterina Smirnova (URS)	6350	Sabine Everts (FRG)	6291	Judy Livermore (GBR)	6184
1985	Małgorzata Guzowska (POL)	6616	Liliana Năstase (ROM)	6313	Judy Simpson (GBR)	6045
1987	Liliana Năstase (ROM)	6364	Yelena Davydova (URS)	6272	Zuzana Lajbnerová (TCH)	6224
1989	Larisa Nikitina (URS)	6847 pts GR	Sabine Braun (FRG)	6575 pts	Jane Flemming (AUS)	6286 pts
1991	Birgit Clarius (GER)	6419 pts	Urszula Włodarczyk (POL)	6319 pts	Maria Kamrowska (POL)	6279 pts
1993	Urszula Włodarczyk (POL)	6127 pts	Birgit Gautzsch (GER)	5934 pts	Kelly Blair (USA)	5926 pts
1995	Jane Jamieson (AUS)	6123 pts	Mona Steigauf (GER)	6102 pts	Irina Tyukhay (RUS)	5989 pts
1997	Mona Steigauf (GER)	6546	Irina Vostrikova (RUS)	6175	Marie Collonvillé (FRA)	6143
1999	Tiffany Lott (USA)	5959	Katerina Nekolná (CZE)	5900	Clare Thompson (AUS)	5766
2001	Jane Jamieson (AUS)	6041	Svetlana Sokolova (RUS)	5985	Sonja Kesselschläger (GER)	5973
2003	Kylie Wheeler; Australia	6031	Jane Jamieson; Australia	5908	Michaela Hejnová; Czech Republic	5795
2005	Lyudmyla Blonska; Ukraine	6297	Simone Oberer; Switzerland	5996	Jessica Ennis; Great Britain	5910
2007	Viktorija Žemaitytė; Lithuania	5971	Sara Aerts; Belgium	5904	Hanna Melnychenko; Ukraine	5852
2009	Jessica Samuelsson; Sweden	6004	Jana Korešová; Czech Republic	5956	Saludes Cristina Barcena; Spain	5828
2011	Olga Kurban; Russia	6151	Viktorija Žemaitytė; Lithuania	5958	Kateřina Cachová; Czech Republic	5873
2013	Laura Ikauniece; Latvia	6321 SB	Györgyi Farkas; Hungary	6269 PB	Eliška Klučinová; Czech Republic	6124
2015	Anna Maiwald; Germany	5965 pts	Ida Marcussen; Norway	5865 pts	Anna Petrich; Russia	5795 pts
2017	Verena Preiner; Austria	6224	Alysha Burnett; Australia	5835 PB	Noor Vidts; Belgium	5728
2019	Miia Sillman; Finland	6209 pts PB	Marthe Koala; Burkina Faso	6121 pts	Caroline Agnou; Switzerland	5844 pts
