= Romania at the 2013 Summer Universiade =

- IOC code: ROU

in Kazan
- Competitors: 106 in 9 sports
- Medals Ranked 20th: Gold 2 Silver 0 Bronze 4 Total 6

Summer Universiade appearances
- 1959; 1961; 1963; 1965; 1967; 1970; 1973; 1975; 1977; 1979; 1981; 1983; 1985; 1987; 1989; 1991; 1993; 1995; 1997; 1999; 2001; 2003; 2005; 2007; 2009; 2011; 2013; 2015; 2017; 2019; 2021; 2025; 2027

Romania competed at the 2013 Summer Universiade in Kazan, Russia.

== Medalists ==
Medal	Name	Sport	Event
Gold	Roxana Bîrcă	Athletics	5000 m
Gold	Ştefan Gheorghiţă	Wrestling	84 kg
Bronze	Simona Pop	Fencing	Individual Épée
Bronze	Andreea Ogrăzeanu	Athletics	100 m
Bronze	Andreea Ogrăzeanu	Athletics	200 m
Bronze	Carmen Toma	Athletics	Triple Jump

== Athletics ==
=== Men ===
Event	Athletes	Qualifying		Semifinal		Final	
Event	Athletes	Result	Rank	Result	Rank	Result	Rank
800 m	Cristian Vorovenci	1:52.31	10 Q	1:48.73	9	Did not advance	
1500 m	Cristian Vorovenci	3:47.07	13			Did not advance	
5000	Adrian Trifan	15:00.28	22			Did not advance	
400 m h	Attila Nagy	50.83	9 Q	54.13	15	Did not advance	
3000 m s	Alexandru Ghinea	8:52.91	8 Q			8:53.14	7
High Jump	Alexandru Tufa	2.15	17			Did not advance	
Triple Jump	Adrian Daianu	15.50	10 q			15.47	11
Javelin Throw	Alexandru Craescu	65.76	21			Did not advance	

=== Women ===
Event	Athletes	Qualifying		Semifinal		Final	
Event	Athletes	Result	Rank	Result	Rank	Result	Rank
100 m	Andreea Ogrăzeanu	11.46	1 Q	11.50	3 Q	11.41	Bronze
200 m	Andreea Ogrăzeanu	23.63	3 Q	23.31	3 Q	23.10	Bronze
1500 m	Florina Pierdevara	4:21.85	9			Did not advance	
5000 m	Roxana Birca					15:39.76	Gold
5000 m	Crtistina Frumuz					16:39.07	8
Long Jump	Cornelia Deiac	6.42	3 Q			6.36	4
Long Jump	Cristina Sandu	6.27	10 Q			6.20	10
Triple Jump	Carmen Toma	13.71	2 q			14.14	Bronze
Hammer Throw	Bianca Perie					68.94	5
Hammer Throw	Judith Nagy					did not finish	

== Basketball ==
Romania qualified both a men's and a women's team.

=== Men ===
The men's team participated in Group B.

==== Team roster ====
The men's team roster was as follows:

Romania Men's World University Games Team roster
Players
Coaches

Pos.	No.	Name	Age – Date of birth	Height	Club	Ctr.
		Vlad Corpodean	22 – February 1, 1991	6 ft 3.6 in (1.92 m)	Babeș-Bolyai University	(Romania)
		Vlad Dumitrescu	23 – April 8, 1990	6 ft 3.6 in (1.92 m)	Oil & Gas University of Ploiești	(Romania)
		Adrian Gutoaia	23 – March 10, 1990	6 ft 6 in (1.98 m)	National School of Political Science and Public Administration	(Romania)
		Dan Ioan	–	6 ft 4.8 in (1.95 m)		(Romania)
		Vlad Negoitescu	21 – July 15, 1991	6 ft 8.3 in (2.04 m)		(Romania)
		Iulian Orbeanu	23 – December 19, 1989	6 ft 8.3 in (2.04 m)	University of Craiova	(Romania)
		Catalin Petrisor	20 – August 9, 1992	6 ft 1.6 in (1.87 m)	University of Craiova	(Romania)
		Alexandru Pop (C)	23 – February 4, 1990	5 ft 10.9 in (1.8 m)	Babeș-Bolyai University	(Romania)
		Adrian Rosu	22 – January 20, 1991	6 ft 4.8 in (1.95 m)		(Romania)
		Bogdan Tibirna	22 – June 7, 1991	6 ft 11.1 in (2.11 m)	Alexandru Ioan Cuza University	(Romania)
		Rolland Torok Sheehey	22 – October 25, 1990	6 ft 7.9 in (2.03 m)	University of Oradea	(Romania)
		George Toth	20 – October 12, 1992	6 ft 11.5 in (2.12 m)	Dimitrie Cantemir Christian University	(Romania)

Head coach
Assistant coach(es)
Team Physician
Athletic Trainer

Legend

- (C) Team captain
- nat field describes country of university
- Age field is age on July 7, 2013

==== Preliminary round ====
Team	Pld	W	L	PF	PA	PD	Pts
Serbia	5	5	0	413	221	+192	10
Romania	5	4	1	315	274	+41	9
Mexico	5	3	2	326	301	+25	8
Mongolia	5	2	3	277	379	−102	7
Japan	5	1	4	284	340	−56	6
Philippines	5	0	5	0	100	−100	5

Note: The Philippines were disqualified because of leaving the tournament before the quarterfinal round. All their matches were cancelled and assigned defeats by 0–20.

7 July 2013
10:30

Romania	20–0	Philippines

Basket Hall

8 July 2013
10:00

Report

Romania	77–57	Japan
Scoring by quarter: 20–9, 18–13, 19–18, 20–17

Basket Hall

9 July 2013
10:00

Report

Romania	89–72	Mongolia
Scoring by quarter: 23–19, 23–15, 24–16, 19–22

Basket Hall

11 July 2013
20:30

Report

Romania	76–67	Mexico
Scoring by quarter: 15–15, 22–16, 10–18, 29–18

Basket Hall

12 July 2013
18:00

Report

Serbia	78–53	Romania
Scoring by quarter: 20–10, 11–12, 19–22, 28–9
Pts: Živanović 14; Rebs: Marković 11; Asts: Kalinić 5		Pts: Toth 20; Rebs: Gutoaia, Toth 3 Asts: 4 players 2

Basket-Hall Arena
Attendance: 250
Referees: Semen Ovinov (RUS), Tim Mills (AUS), Pal Attila Györffy (HUN)

==== Quarterfinals ====
14 July 2013
21:00

Report

Russia	78–53	Romania
Scoring by quarter: 17–15, 16–12, 21–12, 24–14
Pts: Karasev 22; Rebs: Karasev 9 Asts: Grigoryev 5		Pts: Țibîrnă 18; Rebs: Țibîrnă 7 Asts: Petrișor, Török 2

Basket Hall
Attendance: 2,000
Referees: Reid Allan Kenyon (CAN), Saulius Racys (LTU), Kihamu Matsumoto (JPN)

==== Semifinal round ====
===== 5th–8th place =====
15 July 2013
18:00

Romania	82–75	Brazil

Miras Sports Complex

== Judo ==
=== Men ===
Athlete	Event	Round of 32	Round of 16	Quarterfinals	Semifinals	Repechage Round 1	Repechage Round 2	Final of Repechage	Bronze Medal Contest	Final	
Athlete	Event	Opposition Result	Opposition Result	Opposition Result	Opposition Result	Opposition Result	Opposition Result	Opposition Result	Opposition Result	Opposition Result	Rank
Remus Lazea	66 kg	(Kyrgyzstan) Islam Baialinov; L 1011-000	Did not advance								
Denis Mititelu	73 kg	BYE	(Brazil) Joao Macedo; L 1011-001	Did not advance							
Cristian Bodirlau	81 kg	(Italy) Giovanni Carollo; L 110-000	Did not advance								
Lorand Karoly Samel	100 kg	(Egypt) Mahmoud Gaballa; L 111-003	Did not advance								

=== Women ===
Athlete	Event	Round of 32	Round of 16	Quarterfinals	Semifinals	Repechage Round 1	Repechage Round 2	Final of Repechage	Bronze Medal Contest	Final	
Athlete	Event	Opposition Result	Opposition Result	Opposition Result	Opposition Result	Opposition Result	Opposition Result	Opposition Result	Opposition Result	Opposition Result	Rank
Violeta Dumitru	48 kg	(Turkey) Ebru Sahin; L 004-001	Did not advance			(Chile) Antonieta Galleguillos; W 1001-000	(Poland) Ewa Conieczny; L 101-021	Did not advance			
Roxana Ioanca	57 kg	(Ghana) Szandra Szogedi; L 023-002	Did not advance								
Cristina Matei	62 kg	(Russia) Natalia Kuziutina; L 100-001	Did not advance			(Macau) Weng Kei Chan; W 100-000	(South Korea) Miri Kim; L 001-003*	Did not advance			

== Fencing ==
=== Women ===
Athlete	Event	Round of 64	Round of 32	Round of 16	Quarterfinals	Semifinals	Bronze Medal Final	Rank
Athlete	Event	Opposition Score	Opposition Score	Opposition Score	Opposition Score	Opposition Score	Opposition Score	Rank
Simona Pop	Individual Épée	(Ukraine) Olena Kryvytska; W 15-10	(Estonia) Julia Beljajeva; W 15-10	(Poland) Dominika Mosler; W 15-13	(Estonia) Kristina Kuusk; W 15-12	(China) Yiwen Sun; L 8-15	Did not advance	Bronze
Diana Donoiu	Individual Épée	(France) Auriane Mallo; W 15-14	(Russia) Tatyana Andryushina; L 14-15	Did not advance				
Maria Ruxandra Udrea	Individual Épée	(Russia) Tatyana Andryushina; L 8-15	Did not advance					
Ioana Adriana Dumitru	Individual Épée	(Russia) Violetta Kolobova; L 7-15	Did not advance					
Mihaela Bulică	Individual Sabre	(Japan) Tamura Norika; W 15–5	(Ukraine) Halyna Pundyk; L 11–15	Did not advance				

== Gymnastics ==
=== Artistic ===
==== Men ====
Athlete	Event	Final							
Athlete	Event	Apparatus						Total	Rank
Athlete	Event	F	PH	R	V	PB	HB	Total	Rank
Andrei Muntean	Team	—N/a	13.600	14.900	—N/a	15.500	13.850	—N/a	
Ovidiu Buidoso	Team	13.700	14.550	—N/a	—N/a	—N/a	13.650	—N/a	
Marius Berbecar	Team	—N/a	—N/a	—N/a	14.650	14.600	—N/a	—N/a	
Cristian Bățagă	Team	14.250	14.750	14.200	14.500	14.050	13.559	—N/a	
Vlad Cotuna	Team	13.800	12.750	14.300	14.200	14.700	13.150	—N/a	
Total	Team	41.750	42.900	43.400	43.350	44.800	41.050	257.250	=7

== Swimming ==
=== Men ===
Athlete	Events	Heat		Semifinal		Final	
Athlete	Events	Time	Rank	Time	Rank	Time	Rank
Marius Radu	200 m freestyle	1:52.90	26	Did not advance			
Alin Artimon	200 m freestyle	1:54.44	35	Did not advance			
Alin Artimon	400 m freestyle	3:58.46	21			Did not advance	
Daniel Macovei	100 m backstroke	57.66	33	Did not advance			
Alin Coste	50 m butterfly	25.31	36	Did not advance			
Alin Artimon; Marius Radu; Alin Coste; Daniel Macovei	Men's 4 × 100 metre freestyle	3:23.60	12			Did not advance	

== Weightlifting ==
=== Men ===
Athlete	Event	Snatch	Clean & Jerk	Total	Rank
Athlete	Event	Result	Result	Total	Rank
Razvan Nicoara	69 kg	133	162	295	8
George Purice	69 kg	115	140	255	12
Alexandru Rosu	77 kg	151	183	334	7
Florin Olteanu	77 kg	NM	DNF		
Gabriel Sincraian	85 kg	155	191	346	4
Stefan Turcan	85 kg	120	155	275	14

=== Women ===
Athlete	Event	Snatch	Clean & Jerk	Total	Rank
Athlete	Event	Result	Result	Total	Rank
Dana Berchi	53 kg	81	101	182	6
Georgiana Tites	58 kg	80	91	171	11

== Wrestling ==
Men's freestyle

Athlete	Event	Round of 32	Round of 16	Quarterfinal	Semifinal	Repechage 1	Repechage 2	Final / BM	
Athlete	Event	Opposition Result	Opposition Result	Opposition Result	Opposition Result	Opposition Result	Opposition Result	Opposition Result	Rank
George Bucur	66 kg	(Spain) Antonio Vera Ortega; W 4-0	(Germany) Saba Javad Bolaghi; L 1-3	Did not advance					11
Stefan Gheorghita	84 kg	(France) Stephane Marczinski; W 4-0	(Belarus) Amarhadshi Magomedov; W 4-1	(Moldova) Piotr Ianulov; W 3-1	(Uzbekistan) Umidjon Ismanov; W 3-1	Bye		(Russia) Shamil Kudiyamagomedov; W 3-1	Gold
