= Athletics at the 2013 Summer Universiade – Women's 100 metres =

The women's 100 metres event at the 2013 Summer Universiade was held on 7–8 July.

== Medalists ==
Gold	Silver	Bronze
Aurieyall Scott; United States	Lina Grinčikaitė; Lithuania	Andreea Ogrăzeanu; Romania

== Results ==
=== Heats ===
Qualification: First 3 in each heat and 6 best performers advance to the Semifinals.

Wind:
Heat 1: +0.1 m/s, Heat 2: -0.3 m/s, Heat 3: +0.2 m/s, Heat 4: +0.5 m/s, Heat 5: 0.0 m/s, Heat 6: -0.3 m/s

Rank	Heat	Name	Nationality	Time	Notes
1	4	Andreea Ogrăzeanu	Romania	11.46	Q, SB
2	5	Aurieyall Scott	United States	11.48	Q
3	1	Olga Safronova	Kazakhstan	11.52	Q
4	6	Lina Grincikaite	Lithuania	11.52	Q
5	2	Hanna-Maari Latvala	Finland	11.58	Q
6	6	Amy Foster	Ireland	11.60	Q
7	3	Yulia Kashina	Russia	11.62	Q
8	4	Ekaterina Kuzina	Russia	11.66	Q
9	1	Audrey Alloh	Italy	11.67	Q, =SB
10	6	Khamica Bingham	Canada	11.68	Q
11	2	Shai-Anne Davis	Canada	11.72	Q
12	4	Weronika Wedler	Poland	11.72	Q
13	5	Marie-Josée Ta Lou	Ivory Coast	11.76	Q
14	3	Sonia Tavares	Portugal	11.77	Q
15	1	Folake Akinyemi	Norway	11.82	Q
16	6	Syu Yong-jie	Chinese Taipei	11.95	q
17	5	Fanny Appes Ekanga	Cameroon	12.00	Q
18	1	Lusiana Satriani	Indonesia	12.15	q
19	4	Vladislava Ovcharenko	Tajikistan	12.21	q
20	3	Maarja Kalev	Estonia	12.29	Q
21	1	Do Thi Quyen	Vietnam	12.30	q
22	2	Zaidatul Zulkifli	Malaysia	12.32	Q
23	2	Kang Da-seul	South Korea	12.49	q
24	2	Leonah Musikavanhu	Zimbabwe	12.63	q
25	4	Hiyanthi Piyadigama	Sri Lanka	12.65	
26	6	Valeriya Balyanina	Azerbaijan	12.70	
27	1	Bless Dupeh	Ghana	12.84	
28	2	Himashree Roy	India	12.89	
29	5	Olga Eshmurodova	Tajikistan	12.94	
30	3	Abigail Dzamesi	Ghana	13.24	
31	2	In Chi Io	Macau	13.52	
32	3	Ikabongo Ikabongo	Zambia	13.16	PB
33	5	Marina Mpiana Konde	DR Congo	13.63	
34	4	Ishrat Zahan Iva	Bangladesh	13.82	
35	3	Aissa Issa Seyni	Niger	13.99	
36	6	Leonardine Girubugingo	Rwanda	14.79	
37	5	Tumaini Ngwanda	Tanzania	15.07	
	1	Stephanie Kalu	Nigeria	DNS	
	3	Peace Uko	Nigeria	DNS	
	4	Kellyane Ntumba Nzembele	DR Congo	DNS	
	5	Marika Popowicz	Poland	DNS	
	6	Jacira Vaz Martins	Guinea-Bissau	DNS	

=== Semifinals ===
Qualification: First 2 in each heat and 2 best performers advance to the Finals.

Wind:
Heat 1: -0.9 m/s, Heat 2: -0.4 m/s, Heat 3: -0.2 m/s

Rank	Heat	Name	Nationality	Time	Notes
1	1	Aurieyall Scott	United States	11.38	Q
2	3	Lina Grincikaite	Lithuania	11.43	Q
3	2	Andreea Ogrăzeanu	Romania	11.50	Q
4	3	Shai-Anne Davis	Canada	11.59	Q
5	2	Amy Foster	Ireland	11.61	Q
6	3	Audrey Alloh	Italy	11.64	q, SB
7	1	Hanna-Maari Latvala	Finland	11.66	Q
8	3	Olga Safronova	Kazakhstan	11.68	q
9	2	Yulia Kashina	Russia	11.68	
10	1	Ekaterina Kuzina	Russia	11.71	
11	1	Marie-Josée Ta Lou	Ivory Coast	11.73	
12	2	Khamica Bingham	Canada	11.78	
13	1	Weronika Wedler	Poland	11.81	
14	2	Sonia Tavares	Portugal	11.85	
15	2	Syu Yong-jie	Chinese Taipei	11.96	
16	3	Folake Akinyemi	Norway	11.96	
17	3	Fanny Appes Ekanga	Cameroon	12.23	
18	1	Lusiana Satriani	Indonesia	12.32	
19	3	Vladislava Ovcharenko	Tajikistan	12.34	
20	2	Zaidatul Zulkifli	Malaysia	12.42	
21	1	Maarja Kalev	Estonia	12.50	
22	1	Kang Da-seul	South Korea	12.51	
23	2	Leonah Musikavanhu	Zimbabwe	12.89	
	3	Do Thi Quyen	Vietnam	DNS	

=== Final ===
Wind: -0.2 m/s

Rank	Heat	Name	Nationality	Time	Notes
1st place, gold medalist(s)	3	Aurieyall Scott	United States	11.28	
2nd place, silver medalist(s)	4	Lina Grincikaite	Lithuania	11.32	
3rd place, bronze medalist(s)	6	Andreea Ogrăzeanu	Romania	11.41	SB
4	7	Hanna-Maari Latvala	Finland	11.47	
5	8	Amy Foster	Ireland	11.50	
6	5	Shai-Anne Davis	Canada	11.54	
7	2	Olga Safronova	Kazakhstan	11.55	
8	1	Audrey Alloh	Italy	11.62	SB
