= Athletics at the 2013 Summer Universiade – Women's 200 metres =

The women's 200 metres event at the 2013 Summer Universiade was held on 9–10 July.

== Medalists ==
Gold	Silver	Bronze
Kimberly Hyacinthe; Canada	Hanna-Maari Latvala; Finland	Andreea Ogrăzeanu; Romania

== Results ==
=== Heats ===
Qualification: First 3 in each heat and 6 best performers advance to the Semifinals.

Wind:
Heat 1: -0.6 m/s, Heat 2: +0.9 m/s, Heat 3: -0.7 m/s, Heat 4: +0.2 m/s, Heat 5: -0.1 m/s, Heat 6: +0.4 m/s

Rank	Heat	Name	Nationality	Time	Notes
1	1	Nadezhda Kotlyarova	Russia	23.39	Q
2	2	Kimberly Hyacinthe	Canada	23.62	Q
3	3	Andreea Ogrăzeanu	Romania	23.63	Q
4	3	Ewelina Ptak	Poland	23.65	Q
5	5	Shai-Anne Davis	Canada	23.74	Q
6	3	Léa Sprunger	Switzerland	23.76	Q
7	4	Hanna-Maari Latvala	Finland	23.79	Q
8	6	Anastasiya Kocherzhova	Russia	23.82	Q
9	2	Marie-Josée Ta Lou	Ivory Coast	23.88	Q
10	4	Tristie Johnson	United States	23.90	Q
11	3	Sónia Tavares	Portugal	24.04	q, SB
12	5	Syu Yong-jie	Chinese Taipei	24.06	Q
13	6	Arista Nienaber	South Africa	24.11	Q
14	5	Olga Safronova	Kazakhstan	24.12	Q
15	6	Elisabeth Slettum	Norway	24.14	Q
16	2	Niamh Whelan	Ireland	24.15	Q
17	4	Joëlle Golay	Switzerland	24.20	Q
18	5	Fatoumata Diop	Senegal	24.35	q
19	1	Justine Palframan	South Africa	24.43	Q
20	1	Vladislava Ovcharenko	Tajikistan	24.66	Q
21	5	Kang Da-seul	South Korea	25.41	q
22	4	Kulli Kallas	Estonia	25.44	q
23	2	Annika Sakkarias	Estonia	25.63	q
24	1	Nika Barundic	Slovenia	25.75	q
25	5	Asana Abubakari	Ghana	26.10	PB
26	2	Hiyanthi Piyadigama	Sri Lanka	26.11	
27	3	Do Thi Quyen	Vietnam	26.17	
28	3	Leong Ka Man	Macau	26.24	PB
29	3	Himashree Roy	India	26.38	
30	6	Olga Eshmurodova	Tajikistan	26.88	
31	2	Marina Mpiana Konde	Democratic Republic of the Congo	28.44	
32	4	Leonardine Girubugingo	Rwanda	30.21	
33	4	Tumaini Ngwanda	Tanzania	30.85	
34	5	Rosemary Kaputula	Zambia	31.55	
	1	Folake Akinyemi	Norway	DNS	
	1	Jacira Vaz Martins	Guinea-Bissau	DNS	
	1	Amy Foster	Ireland	DNS	
	2	Asiatu Suma	Sierra Leone	DNS	
	3	Olesea Cojuhari	Moldova	DNS	
	4	Fanny Appes Ekanga	Cameroon	DNS	
	5	Husniah Zaidatul Zulkifli	Malaysia	DNS	
	6	Ishrat Zahan Iva	Bangladesh	DNS	
	6	Stephanie Kalu	Nigeria	DNS	
	6	Kellyane Ntumba Nzembele	Democratic Republic of the Congo	DNS	

=== Semifinals ===
Qualification: First 2 in each heat and 2 best performers advanced to the final.

Wind:
Heat 1: +3.0 m/s, Heat 2: +2.0 m/s, Heat 3: +1.7 m/s

Rank	Heat	Name	Nationality	Time	Notes
1	1	Kimberly Hyacinthe	Canada	23.27	Q
2	3	Hanna-Maari Latvala	Finland	23.29	Q, PB
3	2	Andreea Ogrăzeanu	Romania	23.31	Q, SB
4	2	Shai-Anne Davis	Canada	23.33	Q, PB
5	2	Tristie Johnson	United States	23.47	q
6	1	Anastasiya Kocherzhova	Russia	23.49	Q
7	3	Nadezhda Kotlyarova	Russia	23.61	Q
8	1	Marie-Josée Ta Lou	Ivory Coast	23.64	q
9	3	Ewelina Ptak	Poland	23.65	
10	2	Niamh Whelan	Ireland	23.68	SB
11	3	Léa Sprunger	Switzerland	23.80	
12	3	Sónia Tavares	Portugal	23.89	SB
13	3	Justine Palframan	South Africa	23.93	
14	1	Olga Safronova	Kazakhstan	23.95	
15	2	Syu Yong-jie	Chinese Taipei	23.97	
16	2	Elisabeth Slettum	Norway	24.01	
17	1	Arista Nienaber	South Africa	24.23	
18	1	Fatoumata Diop	Senegal	24.24	
19	3	Vladislava Ovcharenko	Tajikistan	24.65	
20	1	Annika Sakkarias	Estonia	25.35	
21	2	Kulli Kallas	Estonia	25.46	
22	2	Kang Da-seul	South Korea	25.60	
23	3	Nika Barundic	Slovenia	25.93	
	1	Joëlle Golay	Switzerland	DQ	

=== Final ===
Wind: +1.6 m/s

Rank	Heat	Name	Nationality	Time	Notes
1st place, gold medalist(s)	4	Kimberly Hyacinthe	Canada	22.78	PB
2nd place, silver medalist(s)	3	Hanna-Maari Latvala	Finland	22.98	PB
3rd place, bronze medalist(s)	5	Andreea Ogrăzeanu	Romania	23.10	PB
4	6	Shai-Anne Davis	Canada	23.12	PB
5	2	Tristie Johnson	United States	23.32	
6	7	Nadezhda Kotlyarova	Russia	23.51	
7	8	Anastasiya Kocherzhova	Russia	23.62	
8	1	Marie-Josée Ta Lou	Ivory Coast	23.63	SB
