= Vladislava Ovcharenko =

Tajikistani sprinter

Vladislava Ovcharenko (born 18 December 1986, in Dushanbe) is a Tajikistani track and field sprinter. At the 2012 Summer Olympics, she competed in the Women's 200 metres.

== Competition record ==
Year	Competition	Venue	Position	Event	Notes
Representing Tajikistan
2003	World Championships	Paris, France	49th (h)	100 m	13.34
2011	World Championships	Daegu, South Korea	45th (h)	100 m	12.23
2012	World Indoor Championships	Istanbul, Turkey	27th (h)	400 m	60.33
2012	Olympic Games	London, United Kingdom	43rd (h)	200 m	12.34
2013	Universiade	Kazan, Russia	19th (sf)	100 m	12.34
2013	Universiade	Kazan, Russia	19th (sf)	200 m	24.65
