= Athletics at the 2009 Summer Universiade – Women's half marathon =

The women's half marathon event at the 2009 Summer Universiade was held on 11 July.

== Results ==
Rank	Name	Nationality	Time	Notes
1st place, gold medalist(s)	Chisato Saito	Japan	1:13:44	
2nd place, silver medalist(s)	Kikuyo Tsuzaki	Japan	1:14:03	SB
3rd place, bronze medalist(s)	Sayo Nomura	Japan	1:14:23	PB
4	Kim Jong-hyang	North Korea	1:14:46	
5	Rasa Drazdauskaitė	Lithuania	1:15:00	PB
6	Kim Mi-gyong	North Korea	1:15:11	
7	Park Ho-sun	South Korea	1:15:28	
8	Rim Yon-hui	North Korea	1:15:59	
9	Filomena Costa	Portugal	1:16:16	
10	Kim Seong-eun	South Korea	1:16:17	
11	Zang Fengmin	China	1:17:11	
12	Paula Claudia Todoran	Romania	1:17:23	
13	Remalda Kergytė	Lithuania	1:18:37	SB
14	Mónika Nagy	Hungary	1:20:17	
15	Niamh Devlin	Ireland	1:21:09	
16	Jane Kipchana	Uganda	1:27:07	
17	Liu Nian	China	1:29:25	
18	Layegha Hashemi	Afghanistan	1:53:24	NR
	Ana Subotić	Serbia	DNF	
	Iveta Sopirova	Bulgaria	DNS	
