= Hanna-Maari Latvala =

Finnish sprinter (born 1987)

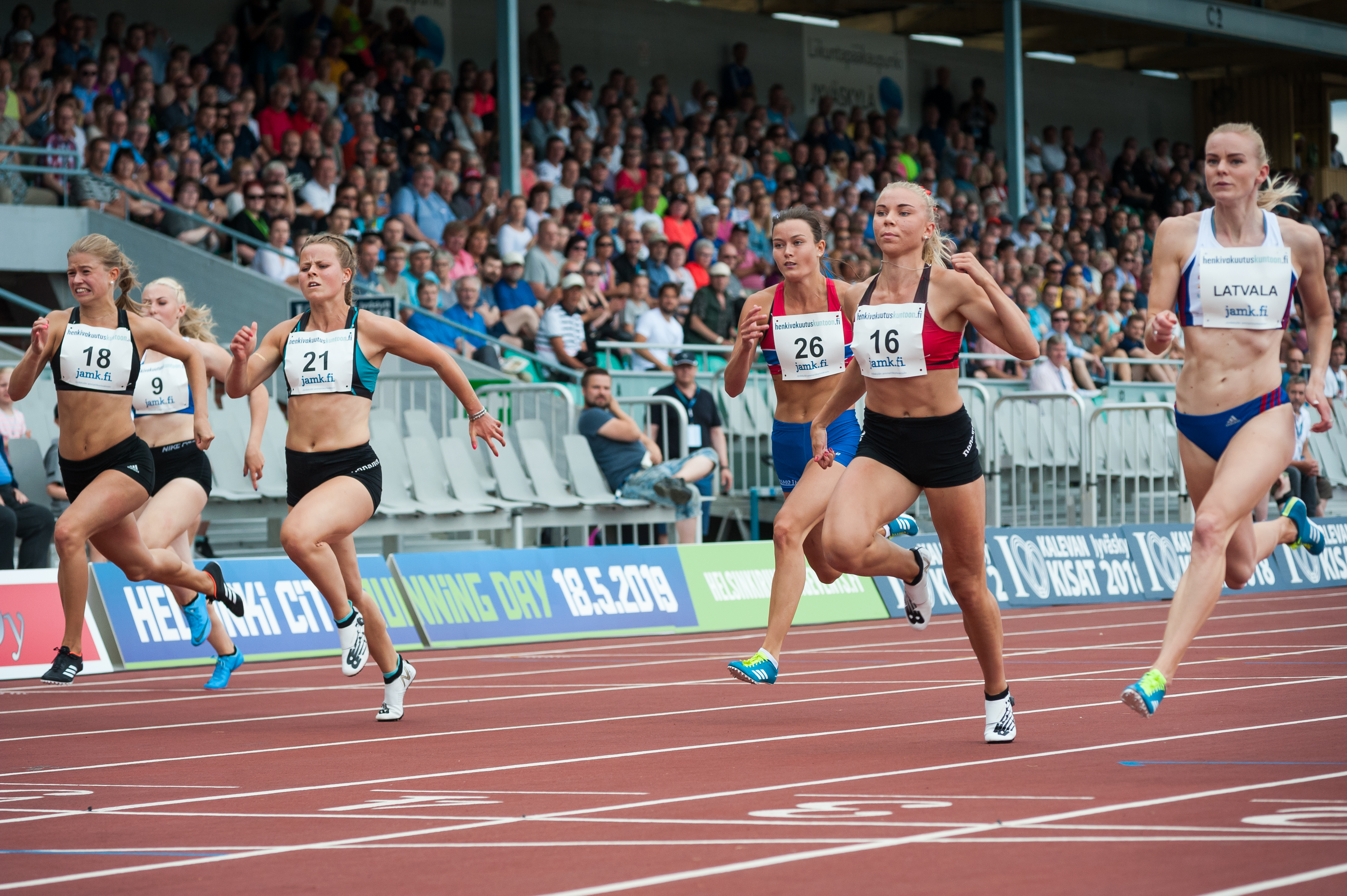
- Hanna-Maari Latvala (first from right) at the 2018 Finnish Championships.

Personal information
- Full name: Hanna-Maari Johanna Latvala
- Nationality: Finnish
- Born: 30 October 1987 (age 38) Kokkola, Finland

Sport
- Country: Finland
- Sport: Athletics
- Events: 100 m, 200 m
- Club: Jyväskylän Kenttäurheilijat
- Coached by: Petteri Jouste

Achievements and titles
- Personal bests: 100m: 11.36 (Weinheim 2013); 200m: 22.98 (Kazan)
Medal record
Representing Finland
Women's athletics
Summer Universiade
Silver medal – second place	2013 Kazan	200 m
- Updated on 15 August 2013

Hanna-Maari Latvala (born 30 October 1987 in Kokkola, Finland) is a Finnish sprinter.

== Competition record ==
Year	Competition	Venue	Position	Event	Notes
Representing Finland
2012	European Championships	Helsinki, Finland	26th (h)	100 m	11.67
2012	European Championships	Helsinki, Finland	12th (h)	4 × 100 m relay	44.65
2013	European Indoor Championships	Gothenburg, Sweden	13th (sf)	60 m	7.34
2013	Universiade	Kazan, Russia	4th	100 m	11.47
2013	Universiade	Kazan, Russia	2nd	200 m	22.98
2013	World Championships	Moscow, Russia	18th (sf)	200 m	23.21
2014	World Indoor Championships	Sopot, Poland	20th (sf)	60 m	7.34
2014	European Championships	Zürich, Switzerland	22nd (sf)	100 m	11.57
2014	European Championships	Zürich, Switzerland	7th	200 m	23.28
2014	European Championships	Zürich, Switzerland	11th (h)	4 × 100 m relay	44.22
2015	European Indoor Championships	Prague, Czech Republic	19th (sf)	60 m	7.37
