= Aurieyall Scott =

American sprinter

Personal information
- Born: May 18, 1992 (age 34) Atlanta, Georgia, U.S.
- Height: 5 ft 7.5 in (1.71 m)

Sport
- Country: United States
- Sport: Track and Field
- University team: UCF Knights
Medal record
Women's athletics
Representing United States
Universiade
Gold medal – first place	2013 Kazan	100 m
- Updated on 10 July 2013

Aurieyall Scott (born May 18, 1992) is an American sprinter who specializes in the 60 and 100 meter dash (indoor) and 100, 200, and 400 meter dash (outdoor).

== High school career ==
For her freshman and sophomore year Scott competed for Groves High School in Garden City, Georgia, where she was twice named the Savannah Morning News track and field athlete of the year. For her junior and senior years, she competed for national power Eleanor Roosevelt High School in Greenbelt, Maryland.

== College career ==
With the University of Central Florida track team Scott won the school's first NCAA title in any sport, taking the 60 meter title at the 2013 NCAA Women's Indoor Track and Field Championship with a time of 7.13 seconds while leading her team to a 5th-place finish. Scott graduated in 2014.

== International career ==
Scott won double gold at the 2012 NACAC Under-23 Championships in Athletics in the 100 meter dash and 4x100 relay.

At the 2013 USA Outdoor Track and Field Championships Scott finished 6th in the 100-meter dash with an official time of 11.00 second. This time was equaled by Muna Lee, but Scott won the tie-breaker with 10.998 vs. 10.999 and thus defeated Lee by one-thousandth of a second. By virtue of placing in the top-6 of the 100 meter dash, Scott was included in the United States delegation to the 2013 World Championships in Athletics.

Scott was entered into the Athletics competition at the 2013 Summer World University Games (Universiade) in Kazan, Russia, initially competing in 200 metres and the 4x100 relay. As a late addition to the 100 metres, she won the gold medal with a time of 11.28 seconds.

== Achievements ==
Year	Competition	Venue	Position	Event	Notes
Representing United States
2012	NACAC U23 Championships	Irapuato, Mexico	1st	100m	11.19 (wind: +1.6 m/s) A
2012	NACAC U23 Championships	Irapuato, Mexico	1st	4 × 100 m relay	43.58 A
2013	Universiade	Kazan, Russia	1st	100 m	11.28
2013	Universiade	Kazan, Russia	2nd	4 × 100 m relay	43.54
