= Sayo Nomura =

Japanese long-distance runner (born 1989)

Sayo Nomura (野村 沙世, Nomura Sayo; born April 18, 1989) is a Japanese runner who finished third at the 2009 Summer Universiade Women's half marathon event.
