= Kikuyo Tsuzaki =

Japanese runner

Kikuyo Tsuzaki (津崎 紀久代, Tsuzaki Kikuyo; born August 27th 1989) is a female Japanese runner who won second place at the 2009 Summer Universiade Women's half marathon event.
