= Vlad Negoitescu =

Romanian basketball player

No. 12 – CSU Asesoft Ploiești
- Position: Center
- League: Liga Națională

Personal information
- Born: July 15, 1991 (age 35) Ploiești, Romania
- Listed height: 6 ft 9 in (2.06 m)
- Listed weight: 198 lb (90 kg)

Career information
- College: Ion Luca Caragiale High-School, Ploiești
- Playing career: 2010–present

Career history
- 2010–present: CSU Asesoft Ploiești

Vlad Negoitescu (born July 15, 1991) is a Romanian professional basketball player for CSU Asesoft Ploiești of the Romanian League.
