= Yekaterina Smirnova =

Soviet heptathlete (born 1956)

Personal information
- Born: October 22, 1956 (age 69)

Sport
- Sport: Track and field
Medal record
Representing Soviet Union
Summer Universiade
| Gold medal – first place | 1979 Mexico City | Pentathlon |
| Gold medal – first place | 1983 Edmonton | Heptathlon |
| Bronze medal – third place | 1977 Sofia | Pentathlon |

Yekaterina Smirnova (born October 22, 1956) is a retired heptathlete who competed for the Soviet Union during her career. She twice won the gold medal at the Summer Universiade. Smirnova set her personal best (6493 points) in the heptathlon on 19 June 1983 at a meet in Moscow.

== Achievements ==
| Year | Competition | Venue | Position | Notes |
|---|---|---|---|---|
| 1978 | European Championships | Prague, Czechoslovakia | 7th | Pentathlon |
| 1979 | Universiade | Mexico City, Mexico | 1st | Pentathlon |
| 1979 | Spartakiad | Moscow, Soviet Union | 1st | Pentathlon |
| 1983 | Universiade | Edmonton, Canada | 1st | Heptathlon |
| 1983 | World Championships | Helsinki, Finland | 6th | Heptathlon |
