= Chisato Saito =

Japanese long-distance runner

Chisato Saito (齊藤 千聖, Saitō Chisato; born 6 December 1988) is a female Japanese long-distance runner from Josai University. She won first place at the 2009 World University Games's Half Marathon for Women.
