= Himashree Roy =

Indian sprinter

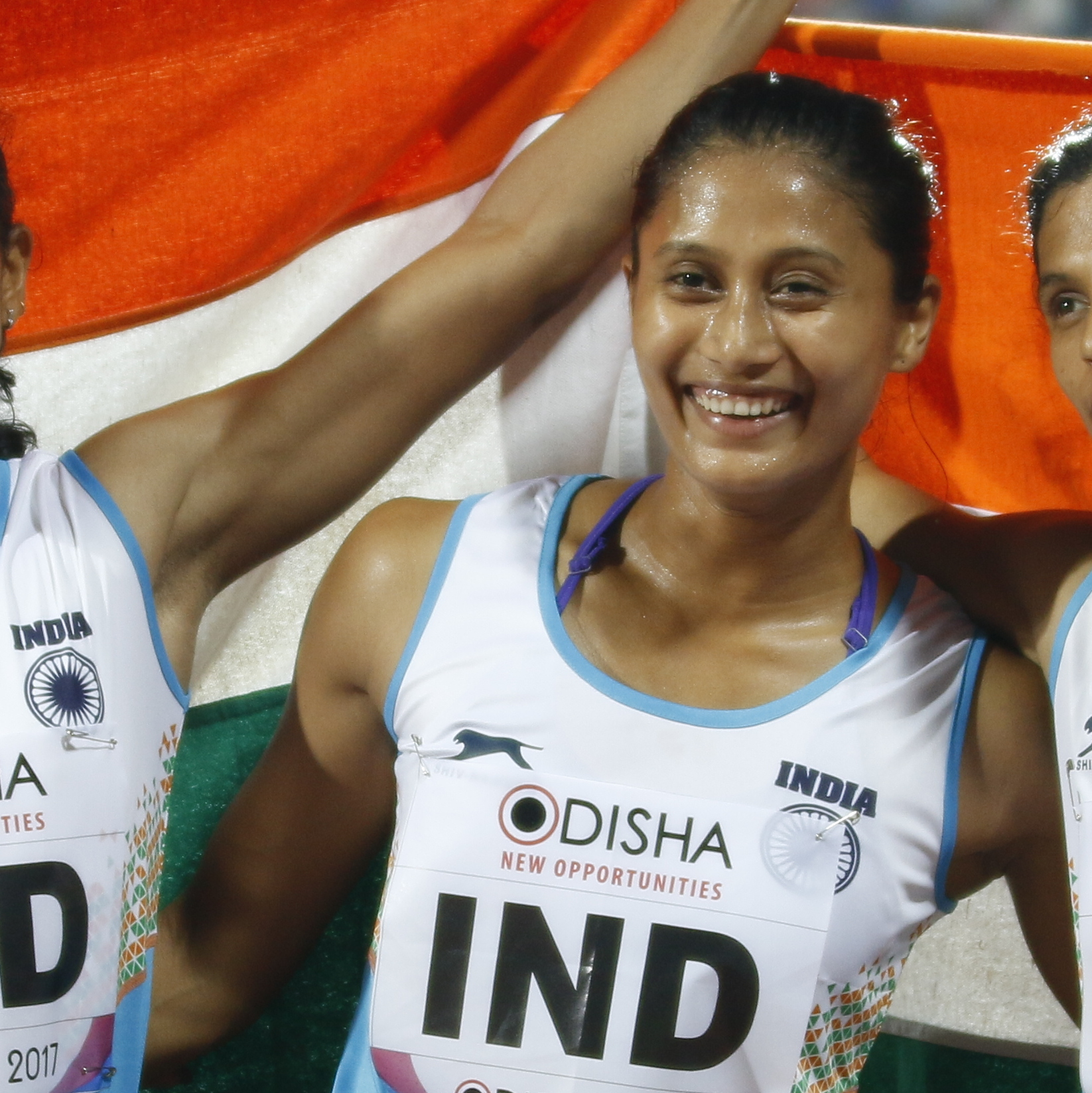
- 4 × 100 m Relay Bronze Medalist 2017

Personal information
- Full name: Himashree Roy
- Nickname: Doli
- Nationality: India
- Born: 15 March 1995 (age 31) Paschim Mallik Para, Jalpaiguri, West Bengal, India

Sport
- Country: India
- Sport: Sprinter
- Event(s): 100 metre, 4 × 100 m relay
Medal record
Women's athletics
Representing India
Asian Championships
Bronze medal – third place	2017 Bhubaneswar	4 × 100 m relay
South Asian Games
Silver medal – second place	2019 Kathmandu	4 × 100 m relay

Himashree Roy (born 15 March 1995) is an Indian athlete. She won the bronze medal in the 100 meters women's relay race along with Merlin K Joseph, Srabani Nanda and Dutee Chand in the 22nd Asian Athletics Championships which concluded on July 9, 2017. She was born in Paschim Mallik Para, Jalpaiguri, West Bengal on 15 March 1995.

== Career ==
She won the silver medal in women's 4 × 100 m relay race along with N. Shardha, Sonal Chawla and Priyanka in the National Open athletics championships 2018 where they represented the Indian Railways.

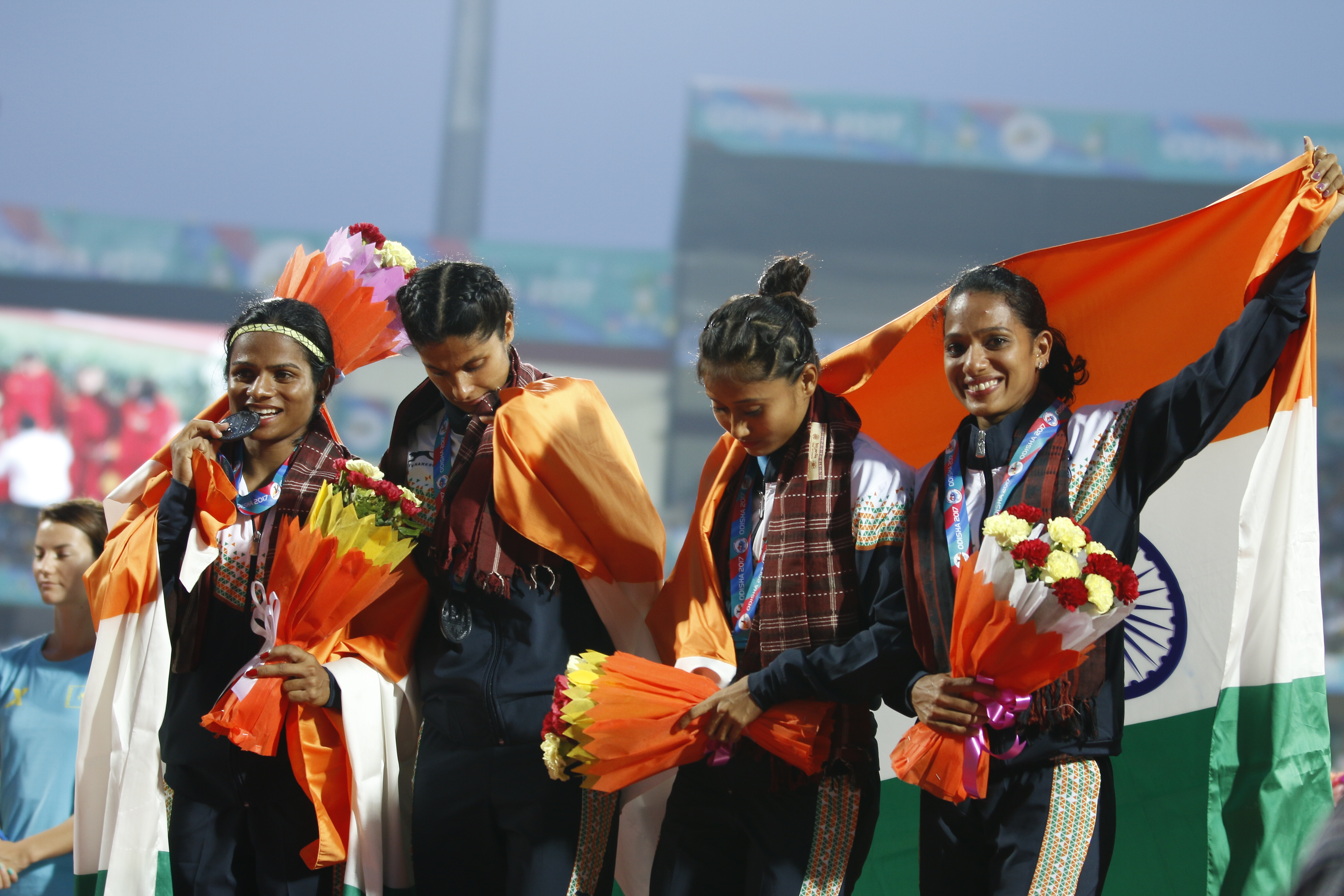
Dutee Chand, Srabani Nanda, Himashree Roy And Merlin Joseph in 22nd Asian Athletics Championships

Himashree Roy timed 11.60 seconds to set a record in women's 100 metres on 5 August 2018 in the 68th State Athletics Championships, at the Salt Lake Stadium while representing the Eastern Railway Sports Association (ERSA). She won the bronze medal in women's 100 m final in 84th All India Railway Athletics Championship, 2017.

Himashree Roy, MG Padmini, Srabani Nanda and Gayathri Govindaraj won the bronze medal for women's 4 × 100 m relay race in the second leg of the 2015 Asian Grand Prix Games, held in Thailand. She also won the gold medal in the women's 4 × 100 metre relay with teammates Dutee Chand, Srabani Nanda and Merlin K Joseph while representing the Indian Railways in the 55th National Open Athletic Championship, 2015.
