= Athletics at the 1977 Summer Universiade – Women's javelin throw =

The women's javelin throw event at the 1977 Summer Universiade was held at the Vasil Levski National Stadium in Sofia on 19 and 20 August.

== Medalists ==
Gold	Silver	Bronze
Nadezhda Yakubovich; Soviet Union	Ivanka Vancheva; Bulgaria	Aranka Vágási; Hungary

== Results ==
=== Qualification ===
Rank	Group	Athlete	Nationality	Result	Notes
1	?	Nadezhda Yakubovich	Soviet Union	56.74	Q
2	?	Sabine Sebrowski	East Germany	56.20	Q
3	?	Aranka Vágási	Hungary	54.98	Q
4	?	Bernadetta Blechacz	Poland	54.28	Q
5	?	Ivanka Vancheva	Bulgaria	54.10	Q
6	?	Yao Ruiying	China	53.76	Q
7	?	Pam Matthews	Australia	53.14	Q
8	?	María Beltrán	Cuba	53.10	Q
9	?	Éva Zörgő	Romania	52.80	Q
10	?	Karin Smith	United States	52.28	Q
11	?	Sofia Sakorafa	Greece	51.76	Q
12	?	Yordanka Peeva	Bulgaria	51.54	Q
13	?	Barbara Latko	Poland	51.52	Q
14	?	Anne Gro Harby	Norway	50.60	
15	?	Giuliana Amici	Italy	50.24	
16	?	Guadalupe López	Mexico	50.14	
17	?	Anne Sophie Hunstad	Norway	45.50	
18	?	Jennifer Pace	Malta	44.46	

=== Final ===
Rank	Athlete	Nationality	Result	Notes
1st place, gold medalist(s)	Nadezhda Yakubovich	Soviet Union	61.42	
2nd place, silver medalist(s)	Ivanka Vancheva	Bulgaria	61.12	
3rd place, bronze medalist(s)	Aranka Vágási	Hungary	61.12	
4	Sabine Sebrowski	East Germany	57.78	
5	Éva Zörgő	Romania	56.70	
6	Karin Smith	United States	55.02	
7	Yordanka Peeva	Bulgaria	54.20	
8	Pam Matthews	Australia	53.00	
9	Sofia Sakorafa	Greece	53.00	
10	Bernadetta Blechacz	Poland	52.62	
11	María Beltrán	Cuba	52.20	
12	Yao Ruiying	China	52.06	
13	Barbara Latko	Poland	49.28	
