= Athletics at the 1980 Summer Olympics – Women's javelin throw =

Women's javelin throw at the Games of the XXII Olympiad
- Date: 24 July 1980 (qualifications); 25 July 1980 (final)
- Competitors: 22 from 13 nations
- Winning distance: 68.40 OR

Medalists
1st place, gold medalist(s)		María Caridad Colón; Cuba
2nd place, silver medalist(s)		Saida Gunba; Soviet Union
3rd place, bronze medalist(s)		Ute Hommola; East Germany

The Women's Javelin Throw event at the 1980 Summer Olympics in Moscow, Soviet Union had an entry list of 22 competitors, with two qualifying groups (22 throwers) before the final (12) took place on Friday July 25, 1980. The top 12 and ties, and all those reaching 60.00 metres advanced to the final. All results were made with a rough surfaced javelin (old design).

== Medalists ==
Gold	María Caridad Colón; Cuba
Silver	Saida Gunba; Soviet Union
Bronze	Ute Hommola; East Germany

== Schedule ==
- All times are Moscow Time (UTC+3)

Qualification Round
24.07.1980 – 12:25h
Final Round
25.07.1980 – 17:15h

== Abbreviations ==
- All results shown are in metres

Q	automatic qualification
q	qualification by rank
DNS	did not start
NM	no mark
WR	world record
AR	area record
NR	national record
PB	personal best
SB	season best

== Records ==
Standing records prior to the 1980 Summer Olympics
World record	Tatyana Biryulina (URS)	70.08 m	July 12, 1980	Podolsk, Soviet Union
Olympic record	Ruth Fuchs (GDR)	65.94 m	July 24, 1976	Montreal, Quebec, Canada
Broken records during the 1980 Summer Olympics
Olympic record	María Caridad Colón (CUB)	'68.40 m	July 25, 1980	Moscow, Soviet Union

== Qualification ==
=== Group A ===
Rank	Overall	Athlete	Attempts			Distance
Rank	Overall	Athlete	1	2	3	Distance
1	1	Ute Richter (GDR)	57.40	66.66	—	66.66 m
2	4	Éva Ráduly-Zörgő (ROU)	63.84	—	—	63.84 m
3	7	María Caridad Colón (CUB)	62.42	—	—	62.42 m
4	8	Ivanka Vancheva (BUL)	61.16	—	—	61.16 m
5	9	Antoaneta Todorova (BUL)	60.56	—	—	60.56 m
6	10	Bernadetta Blechacz (POL)	55.92	50.26	59.90	59.90 m
7	11	Tatyana Biryulina (URS)	57.72	52.44	59.86	59.86 m
8	13	Mária Janák (HUN)	54.22	X	57.80	57.80 m
9	15	Petra Rivers (AUS)	51.08	53.14	55.80	55.80 m
10	18	Fatima Whitbread (GBR)	47.44	47.22	49.74	49.74 m
—	—	Sofia Sakorafa (GRE)	X	X	X	NM

=== Group B ===
Rank	Overall	Athlete	Attempts			Distance
Rank	Overall	Athlete	1	2	3	Distance
1	2	Ruth Fuchs (GDR)	54.12	64.26	—	64.26 m
2	3	Saida Gunba (URS)	63.98	—	—	63.98 m
3	5	Ute Hommola (GDR)	63.52	—	—	63.52 m
4	6	Yadviga Putiniene (URS)	62.96	—	—	62.96 m
5	12	Fausta Quintavalla (ITA)	58.76	X	—	58.76 m
6	14	Tiina Lillak (FIN)	53.44	56.26	X	56.26 m
7	16	Pam Matthews (AUS)	55.72	53.72	51.70	55.72 m
8	17	Agnès Tchuinté (CMR)	55.36	52.16	49.22	55.36 m
9	19	Tessa Sanderson (GBR)	48.76	X	X	48.76 m
10	20	Patricia Guerrero (PER)	38.36	45.40	45.42	45.42 m
—	2	Tsvetana Ralinska (BUL)	—	—	—	DNS

== Final ==
Rank	Athlete	Attempts						Distance
Rank	Athlete	1	2	3	4	5	6	Distance
1st place, gold medalist(s)	María Caridad Colón (CUB)	68.40	X	64.58	62.70	66.02	63.06	68.40 m
2nd place, silver medalist(s)	Saida Gunba (URS)	66.08	67.76	X	63.78	X	65.06	67.76 m
3rd place, bronze medalist(s)	Ute Hommola (GDR)	60.62	58.84	66.04	66.56	61.96	64.92	66.56 m
4	Ute Richter (GDR)	54.86	53.12	62.80	65.68	66.04	66.54	66.54 m
5	Ivanka Vancheva (BUL)	65.38	60.88	X	60.12	61.90	62.90	65.38 m
6	Tatyana Biryulina (URS)	56.28	65.08	58.42	60.36	X	62.48	65.08 m
7	Éva Ráduly-Zörgő (ROU)	X	64.08	54.80	59.44	57.02	54.30	64.08 m
8	Ruth Fuchs (GDR)	59.90	X	61.48	X	63.94	59.20	63.94 m
9	Bernadetta Blechacz (POL)	57.94	52.84	61.46				61.46 m
10	Antoaneta Todorova (BUL)	54.76	60.66	52.98				60.66 m
11	Yadviga Putiniene (URS)	59.94	X	52.72				59.94 m
12	Fausta Quintavalla (ITA)	49.60	57.50	57.52				57.52 m

== See also ==
- 1978 Women's European Championships Javelin Throw (Prague)
- 1982 Women's European Championships Javelin Throw (Athens)
- 1983 Women's World Championships Javelin Throw (Helsinki)
- 1986 Women's European Championships Javelin Throw (Stuttgart)
