= 1982 European Athletics Championships – Women's javelin throw =

Women's javelin throw at the European Athletics Championships

These are the official results of the Women's javelin throw event (old design) at the 1982 European Championships in Athens, Greece, held at Olympic Stadium "Spiros Louis" on 8 and 9 September 1982. All results were made with a rough surfaced javelin (old design).

== Medalists ==
Gold	Anna Verouli; Greece (GRE)
Silver	Antje Kempe; East Germany (GDR)
Bronze	Sofia Sakorafa; Greece (GRE)

== Abbreviations ==
- All results shown are in metres

Q	automatic qualification
q	qualification by rank
DNS	did not start
NM	no mark
WR	world record
AR	area record
NR	national record
PB	personal best
SB	season best

== Results ==
=== Final ===
9 September

Rank	Name	Nationality	Attempts						Result	Notes
Rank	Name	Nationality	1	2	3	4	5	6	Result	Notes
1st place, gold medalist(s)	Anna Verouli	Greece							70.02	CR
2nd place, silver medalist(s)	Antje Kempe	East Germany							67.94	
3rd place, bronze medalist(s)	Sofia Sakorafa	Greece							67.04	
4	Tiina Lillak	Finland							66.26	
5	Ute Richter	East Germany							65.88	
6	Eva Helmschmidt	West Germany							65.82	
7	Petra Felke	East Germany							65.56	
8	Fatima Whitbread	United Kingdom							65.10	
9	Ingrid Thyssen	West Germany							61.28	
10	Mária Janák	Hungary							61.20	
11	Elena Burgárová	Czechoslovakia							59.28	
12	Tuula Laaksalo	Finland							58.52	

=== Qualification ===
8 September

Rank	Name	Nationality	Result	Notes
1	Antje Kempe	East Germany	68.38	Q
2	Tuula Laaksalo	Finland	61.66	Q
3	Sofia Sakorafa	Greece	61.64	Q
4	Anna Verouli	Greece	61.46	Q
5	Petra Felke	East Germany	61.10	Q
6	Tiina Lillak	Finland	60.76	Q
7	Elena Burgárová	Czechoslovakia	60.68	Q
8	Mária Janák	Hungary	60.24	Q
9	Ingrid Thyssen	West Germany	60.22	Q
10	Ute Richter	East Germany	59.80	Q
11	Eva Helmschmidt	West Germany	58.72	Q
12	Fatima Whitbread	United Kingdom	58.08	Q
13	Helena Laine	Finland	57.00	
14	Trine Solberg	Norway	54.54	
15	Regula Egger	Switzerland	54.12	
16	Hilde Bratvold	Norway	53.88	
17	Fausta Quintavalla	Italy	51.76	
18	Genowefa Olejarz	Poland	51.24	
19	Åsa Westman	Sweden	49.90	
20	Jennifer Pace	Malta	39.26	

== Participation ==
According to an unofficial count, 20 athletes from 13 countries participated in the event.

- Czechoslovakia (1)
- East Germany (3)
- Finland (3)
- Greece (2)
- Hungary (1)
- Italy (1)
- Malta (1)
- Norway (2)
- Poland (1)
- Sweden (1)
- Switzerland (1)
- United Kingdom (1)
- West Germany (2)

== See also ==
- 1980 Women's Olympic Javelin Throw (Moscow)
- 1983 Women's World Championships Javelin Throw (Helsinki)
- 1984 Women's Olympic Javelin Throw (Los Angeles)
- 1987 Women's World Championships Javelin Throw (Rome)
- 1988 Women's Olympic Javelin Throw (Seoul)
