= Women's javelin throw world record progression =

The following table shows the world record progression in the women's javelin throw. The first world record in the event was recognised by the International Association of Athletics Federations in 1922. 48 world records have been ratified by the IAAF in the event.

== Records 1922-1998 ==
| Mark | Athlete | Country | Venue | Date |
|---|---|---|---|---|
| 25.01 | Božena Šrámková | Czechoslovakia | Prague | 1922-08-06 |
| 25.325 | Božena Šrámková | Czechoslovakia | Prague | 1922-08-13 |
| 27.24 | Marie Janderová | Czechoslovakia | Ostrava | 1924-05-25 |
| 37.575 | Guschi Hargus | Germany | Berlin | 1927-06-12 |
| 38.39 | Guschi Hargus | Germany | Berlin | 1928-08-18 |
| 40.27 | Ellen Braumüller | Germany | Berlin | 1930-07-12 |
| 42.28 | Ellen Braumüller | Germany | Magdeburg | 1931-08-02 |
| 44.64 | Ellen Braumüller | Germany | Berlin | 1932-06-12 |
| 46.745 | Nan Gindele | United States | Chicago | 1932-06-18 |
| 47.24 | Anneliese Steinheuer | Germany | Frankfurt | 1942-06-21 |
| 48.21 | Herma Bauma | Austria | Vienna | 1947-06-29 |
| 48.63 | Herma Bauma | Austria | Vienna | 1948-09-12 |
| 49.59 | Natalya Smirnitskaya | Soviet Union | Moscow | 1949-07-25 |
| 53.41 | Natalya Smirnitskaya | Soviet Union | Moscow | 1949-08-05 |
| 53.56 | Nadezhda Konyayeva | Soviet Union | Leningrad | 1954-02-05 |
| 55.11 | Nadezhda Konyayeva | Soviet Union | Kiev | 1954-05-22 |
| 55.48 | Nadezhda Konyayeva | Soviet Union | Kiev | 1954-08-06 |
| 55.73 | Dana Zátopková | Czechoslovakia | Prague | 1958-06-01 |
| 57.40 | Anna Pazera | Australia | Cardiff | 1958-07-24 |
| 57.49 | Birutė Zalogaitytė | Soviet Union | Tbilisi | 1958-10-30 |
| 57.92 | Elvīra Ozoliņa | Soviet Union | Leselidze | 1960-05-03 |
| 59.55 | Elvīra Ozoliņa | Soviet Union | Bucharest | 1960-06-04 |
| 59.78 | Elvīra Ozoliņa | Soviet Union | Moscow | 1963-07-03 |
| 62.40 | Yelena Gorchakova | Soviet Union | Tokyo | 1964-10-16 |
| 62.70 | Ewa Gryziecka | Poland | Bucharest | 1972-06-11 |
| 65.06 | Ruth Fuchs | East Germany | Potsdam | 1972-06-11 |
| 66.10 | Ruth Fuchs | East Germany | Edinburgh | 1973-09-07 |
| 67.22 | Ruth Fuchs | East Germany | Rome | 1974-09-03 |
| 69.12 | Ruth Fuchs | East Germany | East Berlin | 1976-07-10 |
| 69.32 | Kate Schmidt | United States | Fürth | 1977-09-11 |
| 69.52 | Ruth Fuchs | East Germany | Dresden | 1979-06-13 |
| 69.96 | Ruth Fuchs | East Germany | Split | 1980-04-29 |
| 70.08 | Tatyana Biryulina | Soviet Union | Podolsk | 1980-07-12 |
| 71.88 | Antoaneta Todorova | Bulgaria | Zagreb | 1981-08-15 |
| 72.40 | Tiina Lillak | Finland | Helsinki | 1982-07-29 |
| 74.20 | Sofia Sakorafa | Greece | Chania | 1982-09-26 |
| 74.76 | Tiina Lillak | Finland | Tampere | 1983-06-13 |
| 75.26 | Petra Felke | East Germany | Schwerin | 1985-06-04 |
| 75.40 | Petra Felke | East Germany | Schwerin | 1985-06-04 |
| 77.44 | Fatima Whitbread | Great Britain | Stuttgart | 1986-08-28 |
| 78.90 | Petra Felke | East Germany | Leipzig | 1987-07-29 |
| 80.00 | Petra Felke | East Germany | Potsdam | 1988-09-09 |

== Records since 1999 ==
In 1999 a new javelin specification was introduced.

| Mark | Athlete | Country | Venue | Date |
|---|---|---|---|---|
| 67.09 | Mirela Maniani | Greece | Seville | 1999-08-28 |
| 68.22 | Trine Hattestad | Norway | Rome | 2000-06-30 |
| 69.48 | Trine Hattestad | Norway | Oslo | 2000-07-28 |
| 71.54 | Osleidys Menéndez | Cuba | Rethymno | 2001-07-01 |
| 71.70 | Osleidys Menéndez | Cuba | Helsinki | 2005-08-14 |
| 72.28 | Barbora Špotáková | Czech Republic | Stuttgart | 2008-09-13 |

== See also ==
- Men's javelin throw world record progression
