= Athletics at the 1981 Summer Universiade – Women's javelin throw =

History

The women's javelin throw event at the 1981 Summer Universiade was held at the Stadionul Naţional in Bucharest on 21 and 22 July 1981.

== Medalists ==
| Gold | Silver | Bronze |
|---|---|---|
| Petra Felke; East Germany | Karin Smith; United States | Mayra Vila; Cuba |

== Results ==
=== Qualification ===
| Rank | Athlete | Nationality | Result | Notes |
|---|---|---|---|---|
| 1 | Petra Felke | East Germany | 64.80 | |
| 2 | Mayra Vila | Cuba | 61.78 | |
| 3 | Corina Gîrbea | Romania | 59.96 | |
| 4 | Karin Smith | United States | 58.94 | |
| 5 | Ingrid Thyssen | West Germany | 57.50 | |
| 6 | María Beltrán | Cuba | 56.70 | |
| 7 | Rositha Potreck | East Germany | 56.22 | |
| 8 | Leolita Blodniece | Soviet Union | 55.76 | |
| 9 | Anna Verouli | Greece | 55.24 | |
| 10 | Fausta Quintavalla | Italy | 54.88 | |
| 11 | Tang Guoli | China | 54.82 | |
| 12 | Marli Santos | Brazil | 52.30 | |
| 13 | Aranka Vágási | Hungary | 49.82 | |
| 14 | Lynda Hughes | United States | 48.84 | |
| 15 | Tatyana Yermolayeva | Soviet Union | 48.82 | |
| 16 | Cristina Dobrinoiu | Romania | 48.72 | |

=== Final ===
| Rank | Athlete | Nationality | Result | Notes |
|---|---|---|---|---|
| 1st place, gold medalist(s) | Petra Felke | East Germany | 65.20 | |
| 2nd place, silver medalist(s) | Karin Smith | United States | 64.12 | |
| 3rd place, bronze medalist(s) | Mayra Vila | Cuba | 63.88 | |
| 4 | Ingrid Thyssen | West Germany | 62.30 | |
| 5 | Rositha Potreck | East Germany | 62.08 | |
| 6 | Tang Guoli | China | 61.58 | |
| 7 | Corina Gîrbea | Romania | 58.94 | |
| 8 | María Beltrán | Cuba | 58.62 | |
| 9 | Leolita Blodniece | Soviet Union | 57.10 | |
| 10 | Fausta Quintavalla | Italy | 56.78 | |
| 11 | Anna Verouli | Greece | 54.70 | |
| | Marli Santos | Brazil | DNS | |
