= Athletics at the 1979 Summer Universiade – Women's javelin throw =

The women's javelin throw event at the 1979 Summer Universiade was held at the Estadio Olimpico Universitario in Mexico City on 9 September 1979.

== Results ==
Rank	Athlete	Nationality	Result	Notes
1st place, gold medalist(s)	Éva Ráduly-Zörgő	Romania	67.20	
2nd place, silver medalist(s)	Ivanka Vancheva	Bulgaria	63.04	
3rd place, bronze medalist(s)	Mayra Vila	Cuba	60.98	
4	Natalya Sipova	Soviet Union	58.70	
5	Tatyana Biryulina	Soviet Union	57.60	
6	Ana González	Cuba	57.34	
7	Marli dos Santos	Brazil	56.04	
8	Corina Girbea	Romania	55.68	
9	Fausta Quintavalla	Italy	54.96	
10	Pam Matthews	Australia	53.26	
11	Ingrid Thyssen	West Germany	51.60	
12	Zhang Li	China	49.22	
13	Laurie Kern	Canada	41.12	
