= Athletics at the 1975 Summer Universiade – Women's javelin throw =

The women's javelin throw event at the 1975 Summer Universiade was held at the Stadio Olimpico in Rome on 21 September.

== Results ==
Rank	Athlete	Nationality	Result	Notes
1st place, gold medalist(s)	Nadezhda Yakubovich	Soviet Union	61.72	
2nd place, silver medalist(s)	Kate Schmidt	United States	60.36	
3rd place, bronze medalist(s)	Éva Zörgő	Romania	59.50	
4	Vera Portnova	Soviet Union	58.84	
5	Yordanka Peeva	Bulgaria	57.20	
6	Imréné Vágó	Hungary	55.88	
7	Tonya Khristova	Bulgaria	55.58	
8	Florentyna Flak	Poland	55.30	
9	Marion Becker	West Germany	53.12	
10	Barbara Latko	Poland	50.22	
11	Giuliana Amici	Italy	48.50	
