= 1983 in the sport of athletics =

1983 in athletics
- Major world events: World Championship in Athletics

This article contains an overview of the year 1983 in athletics.

== International Events ==
- Asian Championships
- Balkan Games
- Central American and Caribbean Championships
- European Indoor Championships
- Mediterranean Games
- Pan American Games
- South American Championships
- World Championships
- World Cross Country Championships
- World Student Games

== World records ==
=== Men ===
EVENT	ATHLETE	MARK	DATE	VENUE
100 metres	Calvin Smith (USA)	9.93	3 July	Air Force Academy, CO, USA
1500 m	Sydney Maree (USA)	3:31.24	28 August	Köln, West Germany
1500 m	Steve Ovett (GBR)	3:30.77	4 September	Rieti, Italy
400m Hurdles	Ed Moses (USA)	47.02	31 August	Koblenz, West Germany
4 × 100 m Relay	United States (USA) • Emmit King • Willie Gault • Calvin Smith • Carl Lewis	37.86	10 August	Helsinki
High Jump	Zhu Jianhua (CHN)	2.37m	11 June	Beijing, PR China
High Jump	Zhu Jianhua (CHN)	2.38m	22 September	Shanghai, PR China
Pole Vault	Pierre Quinon (FRA)	5.82m	28 August	Köln, West Germany
Pole Vault	Thierry Vigneron (FRA)	5.83m	1 September	Rome, Italy
Shot Put	Udo Beyer (GDR)	22.22m	25 June	Los Angeles, United States
Discus	Yuriy Dumchev (URS)	71.86m	29 May	Moscow, Soviet Union
Hammer	Sergey Litvinov (URS)	84.14m	21 June	Moscow, Soviet Union
Javelin (old)	Tom Petranoff (USA)	99.72m	15 May	Westwood, United States
Decathlon	Jürgen Hingsen (FRG)	8825	4–5 June	Bernhausen, West Germany
Half Marathon	Paul Cummings (USA)	1:01:32	25 September	Dayton, Ohio, United States

=== Women ===
EVENT	ATHLETE	MARK	DATE	VENUE
100 metres	Marlies Göhr (GDR)	10.81	8 June	East Berlin
100 metres	Evelyn Ashford (USA)	10.79	3 July	Colorado Springs
400 metres	Jarmila Kratochvílová (TCH)	47.99	10 August	Helsinki
800 metres	Jarmila Kratochvílová (TCH)	1:53.28	26 July	Munich
10,000 metres	Lyudmila Baranova (URS)	31:35.01	29 May	Krasnodar
10,000 metres	Raysa Sadreydinova (URS)	31:27.58	7 September	Odessa
400m Hurdles	Anna Ambrazienė (URS)	54.02	11 June	Moscow
4 × 100 m Relay	East Germany (GDR) • Silke Möller • Marita Koch • Ingrid Auerswald • Marlies Göhr	41.53	31 July	East Berlin
High Jump	Ulrike Meyfarth (FRG)	2.03m	21 August	London
High Jump	Tamara Bykova (URS)	2.04m	25 August	Pisa, Italy
Heptathlon	Ramona Neubert (GDR)	6935	18–19 June	Moscow
Half Marathon	Joan Benoit (USA)	1:09:10	18 September	Philadelphia

== Men's Best Year Performers ==
=== 100 metres ===
Main race this year: World Championships 100 metres

RANK	1983 WORLD BEST PERFORMERS	TIME
1.	Calvin Smith (USA)	9.93
2.	Carl Lewis (USA)	9.97
3.	Mel Lattany (USA)	10.03
4.	Leandro Peñalver (CUB)	10.06
4.	Ron Brown (USA)	10.06
4.	Emmit King (USA)	10.06

=== 200 metres ===
Main race this year: World Championships 200 metres

RANK	1983 WORLD BEST PERFORMERS	TIME
1.	Carl Lewis (USA)	19.75
2.	Calvin Smith (USA)	19.99
3.	Larry Myricks (USA)	20.03
4.	Elliott Quow (USA)	20.16
5.	Mel Lattany (USA)	20.22

=== 400 metres ===
Main race this year: World Championships 400 metres

RANK	1983 WORLD BEST PERFORMERS	TIME
1.	Erwin Skamrahl (FRG)	44.50
2.	Bert Cameron (JAM)	44.62
3.	James Rolle (USA)	44.73
4.	Chris Whitlock (USA)	44.80
5.	Sunder Nix (USA)	44.87

=== 800 metres ===
Main race this year: World Championships 800 metres

RANK	1983 WORLD BEST PERFORMERS	TIME
1.	Steve Cram (GBR)	1:43.61
2.	Willi Wülbeck (FRG)	1:43.65
3.	Sebastian Coe (GBR)	1:43.80
4.	Peter Elliott (GBR)	1:43.98
5.	Joaquim Cruz (BRA)	1:44.04

=== 1,500 metres ===
Main race this year: World Championships 1,500 metres

RANK	1983 WORLD BEST PERFORMERS	TIME
1.	Steve Ovett (GBR)	3:30.77
2.	Sydney Maree (USA)	3:31.24
3.	Steve Cram (GBR)	3:31.66
4.	Saïd Aouita (MAR)	3:32.54
5.	Steve Scott (USA)	3:32.71

=== Mile ===
RANK	1983 WORLD BEST PERFORMERS	TIME
1.	Steve Scott (USA)	3:49.21
2.	John Walker (NZL)	3:49.73
3.	Thomas Wessinghage (FRG)	3:49.98
4.	Sydney Maree (USA)	3:50.30
5.	Steve Ovett (GBR)	3:50.49

=== 3,000 metres ===
RANK	1983 WORLD BEST PERFORMERS	TIME
1.	Doug Padilla (USA)	7:35.84
2.	Eamonn Coghlan (IRL)	7:38.39
3.	António Leitão (POR)	7:39.69
4.	Thomas Wessinghage (FRG)	7:39.71
5.	Dragan Zdravković (YUG)	7:40.49

=== 5,000 metres ===
Main race this year: World Championships 5,000 metres

RANK	1983 WORLD BEST PERFORMERS	TIME
1.	Fernando Mamede (POR)	13:08.54
2.	António Leitão (POR)	13:14.13
3.	Doug Padilla (USA)	13:17.69
4.	Antonio Prieto (ESP)	13:18.53
5.	Thomas Wessinghage (FRG)	13:18.86

=== 10,000 metres ===
Main race this year: World Championships 10,000 metres

RANK	1983 WORLD BEST PERFORMERS	TIME
1.	Carlos Lopes (POR)	27:23.44
2.	Werner Schildhauer (GDR)	27:24.95
3.	Fernando Mamede (POR)	27:25.13
4.	Hansjörg Kunze (GDR)	27:30.69
5.	Nick Rose (GBR)	27:31.19

=== Half Marathon ===
RANK	1983 WORLD BEST PERFORMERS	TIME
1.	Paul Cummings (USA)	1:01:32 WR

=== Marathon ===
Main race this year: World Championships Marathon

RANK	1983 WORLD BEST PERFORMERS	TIME
1.	Robert de Castella (AUS)	2:08:37
2.	Toshihiko Seko (JPN)	2:08:38
3.	Carlos Lopes (POR)	2:08:39
4.	Takeshi So (JPN)	2:08:55
4.	Juma Ikangaa (TAN)	2:08:55

=== 110m Hurdles ===
Main race this year: World Championships 110m Hurdles

RANK	1983 WORLD BEST PERFORMERS	TIME
1.	Greg Foster (USA)	13.11
2.	Sam Turner (USA)	13.17
3.	Tonie Campbell (USA)	13.32
4.	Arto Bryggare (FIN)	13.44
4.	Roger Kingdom (USA)	13.44

=== 400m Hurdles ===
Main race this year: World Championships 400m Hurdles

RANK	1983 WORLD BEST PERFORMERS	TIME
1.	Edwin Moses (USA)	47.02
2.	Andre Phillips (USA)	47.78
3.	David Patrick (USA)	48.05
4.	David Lee (USA)	48.42
5.	Harald Schmid (FRG)	48.49

=== 3,000m Steeplechase ===
Main race this year: World Championships 3,000m Steeplechase

RANK	1983 WORLD BEST PERFORMERS	TIME
1.	Henry Marsh (USA)	8:12.37
2.	Bogusław Mamiński (POL)	8:12.62
3.	Patriz Ilg (FRG)	8:15.06
4.	Graeme Fell (GBR)	8:15.16
5.	Joseph Mahmoud (FRA)	8:15.59

=== High Jump ===
Main competition this year: World Championships High Jump

RANK	1983 WORLD BEST PERFORMERS	HEIGHT
1.	Zhu Jianhua (CHN)	2.38 WR
2.	Valeriy Sereda (URS)	2.35
3.	Paul Frommeyer (FRG)	2.34
3.	Carlo Thränhardt (FRG)	2.34
3.	Eddy Annys (BEL)	2.34

=== Long Jump ===
Main competition this year: World Championships Long Jump

RANK	1983 WORLD BEST PERFORMERS	DISTANCE
1.	Carl Lewis (USA)	8.79
2.	Jason Grimes (USA)	8.39
3.	Sergey Rodin (URS)	8.33
3.	Reginald Kelly (USA)	8.33
5.	Aleksandr Beskrovniy (URS)	8.28

=== Triple Jump ===
Main competition this year: World Championships Triple Jump

RANK	1983 WORLD BEST PERFORMERS	DISTANCE
1.	Vasiliy Grishchenkov (URS)	17.55
2.	Aleksandr Beskrovniy (URS)	17.53
3.	Zdzislaw Hoffmann (POL)	17.42
4.	Lázaro Betancourt (CUB)	17.40
5.	Ken Lorraway (AUS)	17.35

=== Discus ===
Main competition this year: World Championships Discus Throw

RANK	1983 WORLD BEST PERFORMERS	DISTANCE
1.	Yuriy Dumchev (URS)	71.86 WR
2.	Ben Plucknett (USA)	71.32
3.	Art Burns (USA)	71.18
4.	Luis Delís (CUB)	71.06
5.	Imrich Bugár (TCH)	70.72

=== Hammer ===
RANK	1983 WORLD BEST PERFORMERS	DISTANCE
1.	Sergey Litvinov (URS)	84.14
2.	Igor Nikulin (URS)	82.92
3.	Yuriy Tarasyuk (URS)	81.18
4.	Juha Tiainen (FIN)	81.02
5.	Yuriy Syedikh (URS)	80.94

=== Shot Put ===
Main competition this year: World Championships Shot Put

RANK	1983 WORLD BEST PERFORMERS	DISTANCE
1.	Udo Beyer (GDR)	22.22 WR
2.	Dave Laut (USA)	21.94
3.	Edward Sarul (POL)	21.68
4.	Kevin Akins (USA)	21.61
5.	Mike Lehmann (USA)	21.43

=== Javelin (old design) ===
Main competition this year: World Championships Javelin Throw

RANK	1983 WORLD BEST PERFORMERS	DISTANCE
1.	Tom Petranoff (USA)	99.72
2.	Detlef Michel (GDR)	96.72
3.	Heino Puuste (URS)	94.20
4.	Dainis Kula (URS)	91.88
5.	Klaus Tafelmeier (FRG)	91.44

=== Pole Vault ===
Main competition this year: World Championships Pole Vault

RANK	1983 WORLD BEST PERFORMERS	HEIGHT
1.	Thierry Vigneron (FRA)	5.83
2.	Pierre Quinon (FRA)	5.82
3.	Billy Olson (USA)	5.80
4.	Jeff Buckingham (USA)	5.76
5.	Brad Pursley (USA)	5.75

=== Decathlon ===
Main competition this year: World Championships Decathlon

RANK	1983 WORLD BEST PERFORMERS	POINTS
1.	Jürgen Hingsen (FRG)	8779 WR
2.	Siegfried Wentz (FRG)	8718
3.	Daley Thompson (GBR)	8666
4.	Grigoriy Degtyaryev (URS)	8538
5.	Uwe Freimuth (GDR)	8501

== Women's Best Year Performers ==
=== 100 metres ===
Main race this year: World Championships 100 metres

RANK	1983 WORLD BEST PERFORMERS	TIME
1.	Evelyn Ashford (USA)	10.79 WR
2.	Marlies Göhr (GDR)	10.81 WR
3.	Marita Koch (GDR)	10.83
4.	Diane Williams (USA)	10.94
5.	Silke Gladisch (GDR)	11.03

=== 200 metres ===
Main race this year: World Championships 200 metres

RANK	1983 WORLD BEST PERFORMERS	TIME
1.	Marita Koch (GDR)	21.82
2.	Evelyn Ashford (USA)	21.88
3.	Chandra Cheeseborough (USA)	21.99
4.	Merlene Ottey (JAM)	22.19
5.	Florence Griffith (USA)	22.23

=== 400 metres ===
Main race this year: World Championships 400 metres

RANK	1983 WORLD BEST PERFORMERS	TIME
1.	Jarmila Kratochvílová (TCH)	47.99 WR
2.	Tatána Kocembová (TCH)	48.59
3.	Mariya Pinigina (URS)	49.19
4.	Gaby Bußmann (FRG)	49.75
5.	Marita Payne (CAN)	50.06

=== 800 metres ===
Main race this year: World Championships 800 metres

RANK	1983 WORLD BEST PERFORMERS	TIME
1.	Jarmila Kratochvílová (TCH)	1:53.28 WR
2.	Yekaterina Podkopayeva (URS)	1:55.96
3.	Lyubov Gurina (URS)	1:56.11
4.	Zamira Zaytseva (URS)	1:56.21
5.	Tatyana Providokhina (URS)	1:56.81

=== 1,500 metres ===
Main race this year: World Championships 1,500 metres

RANK	1983 WORLD BEST PERFORMERS	TIME
1.	Mary Decker (USA)	3:57.12
2.	Ravilya Agletdinova (URS)	3:59.31
3.	Fiţa Lovin (ROU)	4:00.12
4.	Yekaterina Podkopayeva (URS)	4:00.3
5.	Maria Radu (ROU)	4:00.62

=== 3,000 metres ===
Main race this year: World Championships 3,000 metres

RANK	1983 WORLD BEST PERFORMERS	TIME
1.	Tatyana Kazankina (URS)	8:32.08
2.	Alla Yushina (URS)	8:34.02
3.	Galina Zakharova (URS)	8:34.60
4.	Mary Decker (USA)	8:34.62
5.	Svetlana Guskova (URS)	8:35.06

=== 5,000 metres ===
RANK	1983 WORLD BEST PERFORMERS	TIME
1.	Zola Budd (RSA)	15:10.65
2.	Anna Domoradskaya (URS)	15:19.0

=== 10,000 metres ===
RANK	1983 WORLD BEST PERFORMERS	TIME
1.	Raysa Sadreydinova (URS)	31:27.58 WR
2.	Lyudmila Baranova (URS)	31:35.01 WR
3.	Tatyana Pozdnyakova (URS)	31:48.94
4.	Olga Bondarenko (URS)	31:49.44
5.	Aurora Cunha (POR)	31:52.85

=== Half Marathon ===
RANK	1983 WORLD BEST PERFORMERS	TIME
1.	Joan Benoit (USA)	1:09:10

=== Marathon ===
Main race this year: World Championships Marathon

RANK	1983 WORLD BEST PERFORMERS	TIME
1.	Joan Benoit (USA)	2:22:43
2.	Grete Waitz (NOR)	2:25:17
3.	Julie Brown (USA)	2:26:26
4.	Mary O'Connor (NZL)	2:28:20
5.	Charlotte Teske (FRG)	2:28:32

=== 100m Hurdles ===
Main race this year: World Championships 100m Hurdles

RANK	1983 WORLD BEST PERFORMERS	TIME
1.	Bettine Jahn (GDR)	12.42
2.	Ginka Zagorcheva (BUL)	12.49
3.	Kerstin Knabe (GDR)	12.62
4.	Yordanka Donkova (BUL)	12.65
5.	Cornelia Riefstahl (GDR)	12.72

=== 400m Hurdles ===
Main race this year: World Championships 400m Hurdles

RANK	1983 WORLD BEST PERFORMERS	TIME
1.	Anna Ambrazienė (URS)	54.02 WR
2.	Yekaterina Fesenko (URS)	54.14
3.	Ellen Fiedler (GDR)	54.20
4.	Petra Pfaff (GDR)	54.64
5.	Yelena Filipishina (URS)	54.72

=== High Jump ===
Main competition this year: World Championships High Jump

RANK	1983 WORLD BEST PERFORMERS	HEIGHT
1.	Tamara Bykova (URS)	2.04 WR
2.	Ulrike Meyfarth (FRG)	2.03 WR
3.	Louise Ritter (USA)	2.01
4.	Kerstin Brandt (GDR)	1.99
5.	Larisa Kositsyna (URS)	1.98
5.	Silvia Costa (CUB)	1.98
5.	Valentina Poluyko (URS)	1.98

=== Long Jump ===
Main competition this year: World Championships Long Jump

RANK	1983 WORLD BEST PERFORMERS	DISTANCE
1.	Anişoara Cuşmir (ROU)	7.43
2.	Heike Daute (GDR)	7.14
3.	Svetlana Zorina (URS)	7.04
3.	Tatyana Proskuryakova (URS)	7.04
5.	Margarita Butkiené (URS)	7.00

=== Discus ===
Main competition this year: World Championships Discus Throw

RANK	1983 WORLD BEST PERFORMERS	DISTANCE
1.	Galina Savinkova (URS)	73.26
2.	Gisela Beyer (GDR)	70.96
3.	Mariya Petkova (BUL)	70.74
4.	Martina Hellmann (GDR)	70.26
5.	Zdeňka Šilhavá (TCH)	70.00

=== Shot Put ===
Main competition this year: World Championships Shot Put

RANK	1983 WORLD BEST PERFORMERS	DISTANCE
1.	Ilona Slupianek (GDR)	22.40
2.	Helena Fibingerová (TCH)	21.46
3.	Zdeňka Šilhavá (TCH)	21.05
4.	Mihaela Loghin (ROU)	20.95
5.	Nunu Abashidze (URS)	20.94

=== Javelin (old design) ===
Main competition this year: World Championships Javelin Throw

RANK	1983 WORLD BEST PERFORMERS	DISTANCE
1.	Tiina Lillak (FIN)	74.76
2.	Tessa Sanderson (GBR)	73.58
3.	Sofia Sakorafa (GRE)	72.28
4.	Antje Zöllkau (GDR)	71.00
5.	Anna Verouli (GRE)	70.90

=== Heptathlon ===
Main competition this year: World Championships Heptathlon

RANK	1983 WORLD BEST PERFORMERS	POINTS
1.	Ramona Neubert (GDR)	6935 WR
2.	Sabine Paetz (GDR)	6713
3.	Lyudmila Kolyadina (URS)	6541
4.	Yekaterina Smirnova (URS)	6536
5.	Anke Vater (GDR)	6531

== Births ==
- January 4 — Laura Douglas, Welsh hammer thrower
- January 7 — Marc Burns, Trinidad and Tobago athlete
- January 7 — Stéphanie Falzon, French hammer thrower
- January 11 — Cui Zhide, Chinese race walker
- January 16 — Trevell Quinley, American long jumper
- January 26 — Arturo Casado, Spanish middle-distance runner
- January 28 — Chiara Rosa, Italian shot putter
- February 1 — Alice Timbilili, Kenyan distance runner
- February 2 — Athanasia Perra, Greek triple jumper
- March 10 — Yelena Bolsun, Russian sprinter
- March 14 — Jiang Qiuyan, Chinese race walker
- March 21 — Martina Hrašnová, Slovak hammer thrower
- March 21 — Jussi Heikkilä, Finnish hurdler
- March 22 — André Pollmächer, German long-distance runner
- March 23 — Mo Farah, Somali-British distance runner
- March 28 — Jurica Grabušić, Croatian hurdler
- April 25 — Nick Willis, New Zealand middle-distance runner
- May 5 — Mabel Gay, Cuban triple jumper
- June 4 — Satoshi Osaki, Japanese long-distance runner
- July 12 — Yarelis Barrios, Cuban discus thrower
- July 18 — Mikk Pahapill, Estonian decathlete
- July 20 — Ignisious Gaisah, Ghanaian athlete
- August 2 — Zuzana Malíková, Slovak race walker
- August 4 — Fábio Gomes da Silva, Brazilian pole vaulter
- September 2 — Tatyana Kozlova, Russian race walker
- September 11 — Vivian Cheruiyot, Kenyan distance runner
- September 14 — Mestawet Tufa, Ethiopian distance runner
- October 2 — Michael Kipyego, Kenyan runner
- October 5 — Hamid Ezzine, Moroccan long-distance runner
- October 6 — Leonid Andreev, Uzbekistani decathlete and pole vaulter
- October 8 — Mihkel Kukk, Estonian javelin thrower
- October 10 — Dong Jimin, Chinese race walker
- October 22 — Mika Vasara, Finnish shot putter
- October 22 — Li Zhuhong, Chinese long-distance runner
- November 19 — Meseret Defar, Ethiopian distance runner
- December 2 — Yelena Priyma, Russian hammer thrower
- December 6 — Urszula Piwnicka, Polish javelin thrower
- December 8 — Aliaksandr Kazulka, Belarusian hammer thrower
- December 9 — Diana Pickler, American heptathlete
- December 13 — Janeth Jepkosgei, Kenyan middle-distance runner
- December 22 — Viola Kibiwot, Kenyan middle-distance runner
- December 27 — Tomo Morimoto, Japanese long-distance runner

== Deaths ==
- January 21 — Antonio Siddi (59), Italian athlete (b. 1923)
- January 24 — Juan Carlos Zabala (71), Argentine athlete (b. 1911)
- February 14 — Lina Radke (79), German athlete (b. 1903)
- September 12 — Sabin Carr (79), American pole vaulter (b. 1904)
