= 1978 European Athletics Championships – Women's javelin throw =

Women's javelin throw at the European Athletics Championships

The women's javelin throw at the 1978 European Athletics Championships was held in Prague, then Czechoslovakia, at Stadion Evžena Rošického on 31 August and 1 September 1978.

== Medalists ==
Gold	Ruth Fuchs; East Germany
Silver	Tessa Sanderson; Great Britain
Bronze	Ute Hommola; East Germany

== Results ==
=== Final ===
1 September

Rank	Name	Nationality	Result	Notes
1st place, gold medalist(s)	Ruth Fuchs	East Germany	69.16	AR
2nd place, silver medalist(s)	Tessa Sanderson	Great Britain	62.40	
3rd place, bronze medalist(s)	Ute Hommola	East Germany	62.32	
4	Ute Richter	East Germany	62.04	
5	Éva Ráduly-Zörgő	Romania	61.14	
6	Eva Helmschmidt	West Germany	60.96	
7	Ingrid Thyssen	West Germany	60.18	
8	Bernadetta Blechacz	Poland	60.14	
9	Nina Nikanorova	Soviet Union	57.50	
10	Jadvyga Putinienė	Soviet Union	57.28	
11	Elena Burgárová	Czechoslovakia	57.22	
12	Ivanka Vancheva	Bulgaria	53.10	

=== Qualification ===
31 August

Rank	Name	Nationality	Result	Notes
1	Nina Nikanorova	Soviet Union	63.18	Q
2	Ruth Fuchs	East Germany	60.36	Q
3	Éva Ráduly-Zörgő	Romania	59.84	Q
4	Jadvyga Putinienė	Soviet Union	59.84	Q
5	Ingrid Thyssen	West Germany	59.62	Q
6	Ivanka Vancheva	Bulgaria	59.34	Q
7	Tessa Sanderson	Great Britain	59.04	Q
8	Ute Richter	East Germany	59.00	Q
9	Eva Helmschmidt	West Germany	58.74	Q
10	Bernadetta Blechacz	Poland	58.38	Q
11	Elena Burgárová	Czechoslovakia	57.40	Q
12	Ute Hommola	East Germany	57.18	Q
13	Sofia Sakorafa	Greece	56.76	
14	Tsvetanka Mikhailova	Bulgaria	54.72	
15	Giuliana Amici	Italy	52.66	
16	Lidia Berkhout	Netherlands	52.14	

== Participation ==
According to an unofficial count, 16 athletes from 11 countries participated in the event.

- Bulgaria (2)
- Czechoslovakia (1)
- East Germany (3)
- Greece (1)
- Italy (1)
- Netherlands (1)
- Poland (1)
- Romania (1)
- Soviet Union (2)
- Great Britain (1)
- West Germany (2)
