= Athletics at the 1976 Summer Olympics – Women's javelin throw =

Women's javelin throw at the Games of the XXI Olympiad
- Venue: Olympic Stadium
- Date: 23 July 1976 (qualifications); 24 July 1976 (finals)
- Competitors: 15 from 10 nations
- Winning distance: 65.94 OR

Medalists
1st place, gold medalist(s)		Ruth Fuchs; East Germany
2nd place, silver medalist(s)		Marion Becker; West Germany
3rd place, bronze medalist(s)		Kate Schmidt; United States

The Women's javelin throw competition at the 1976 Summer Olympics in Montreal was held on 23–24 July.

== Records ==
Prior to the competition, these were the following World and Olympic records.

World record	Ruth Fuchs (GDR)	69.12 m.	Berlin, East Germany	10 July 1976
Olympic record	Ruth Fuchs (GDR)	65.12 m.	Munich, West Germany	1 September 1972

The following new Olympic record was set during the competition

Date	Athlete	Country	Distance	OR	WR
24 July	Ruth Fuchs	East Germany	65.94 m.	OR	

== Results ==
=== Qualification ===
The qualification distance was set to 60.00 metres.

Rank	Name	Nationality	#1	#2	#3	Result	Note
1	Marion Becker	West Germany	65.14			65.14	
2	Ruth Fuchs	East Germany	62.46			62.46	Q
3	Kate Schmidt	United States	61.50			61.50	Q
4	Eva Janko	Austria	60.90			60.90	Q
5	Jacqueline Hein	East Germany	60.70			60.70	Q
6	Karin Smith	United States	x	x	59.36	59.36	q
7	Tessa Sanderson	Great Britain	x	57.18	–	57.18	q
8	Svetlana Babich	Soviet Union	56.82	–	–	56.82	q
9	Yordanka Peeva	Bulgaria	x	53.62	56.74	56.74	q
10	Nadezhda Yakubovich	Soviet Union	x	x	56.56	56.56	q
11	Sabine Sebrowski	East Germany	55.42	–	–	55.42	q
12	Éva Ráduly-Zörgő	Romania	55.34	–	–	55.34	q
13	Sherry Calvert	United States	52.58	x	53.08	53.08	
	Sofia Sakorafa	Greece				NM	
	Christine Hunt	Australia				NM	

=== Final ===
Rank	Name	Nationality	#1	#2	#3	#4	#5	#6	Result	Notes
1st place, gold medalist(s)	Ruth Fuchs	East Germany	65.94	59.58	65.06	54.48	58.82	58.44	65.94	OR
2nd place, silver medalist(s)	Marion Becker	West Germany	60.66	60.52	64.70	x	x	x	64.70	
3rd place, bronze medalist(s)	Kate Schmidt	United States	x	x	59.70	57.90	x	63.96	63.96	
4	Jacqueline Hein	East Germany	58.30	61.68	60.90	55.16	x	63.84	63.84	
5	Sabine Sebrowski	East Germany	57.02	59.10	63.08	56.46	54.34	51.72	63.08	
6	Svetlana Babich	Soviet Union	x	49.24	59.42	x	x	x	59.42	
7	Nadezhda Yakubovich	Soviet Union	58.10	x	59.16	55.76	x	52.66	59.16	
8	Karin Smith	United States	53.86	57.50	55.32	52.66	45.08	39.48	57.50	
9	Eva Janko	Austria	55.04	57.20	x				57.20	
10	Tessa Sanderson	Great Britain	57.00	55.96	x				57.00	
11	Éva Ráduly-Zörgő	Romania	54.40	53.88	55.60				55.60	
12	Yordanka Peeva	Bulgaria	50.28	52.02	52.24				52.24	
