= Athletics at the 1973 Summer Universiade – Women's javelin throw =

The women's javelin throw event at the 1973 Summer Universiade was held at the Central Lenin Stadium in Moscow on 16 August.

== Results ==
Rank	Athlete	Nationality	#1	#2	#3	#4	#5	#6	Result	Notes
1st place, gold medalist(s)	Svetlana Korolyova	Soviet Union	x	62.00	x	57.68	x	56.54	62.00	UR
2nd place, silver medalist(s)	Kate Schmidt	United States	57.24	55.84	59.40	59.32	60.34	x	60.34	
3rd place, bronze medalist(s)	Lyutviyan Mollova	Bulgaria							59.04	
4	Sabine Kärgel	East Germany							55.54	
5	Nina Marakina	Soviet Union							54.38	
6	Mieko Takasaka	Japan							52.14	
7	Katalin Csaba	Hungary							51.98	
8	Magda Paulányi	Hungary							50.50	
9	Elena Neacsu	Romania							47.50	
10	Lynn Cannon	United States							47.46	
11	Florentyna Flak	Poland							45.88	
12	Helene Hering	West Germany							42.58	
