= 1983 World Championships in Athletics – Women's javelin throw =

These are the official results of the Women's Javelin Throw event at the 1983 World Championships in Helsinki, Finland. There were a total of 23 participating athletes, with the final held on Saturday August 13, 1983. The qualification mark was set at 62.00 metres. All results were made with a rough surfaced javelin (old design).

== Medalists ==
Gold	Tiina Lillak; Finland (FIN)
Silver	(United Kingdom) Fatima Whitbread; Great Britain (GBR)
Bronze	Anna Verouli; Greece (GRE)

== Schedule ==
- All times are Eastern European Time (UTC+2)

Qualification Round
Group A	Group B
12.08.1983 – ??:??h	12.08.1983 – ??:??h
Final Round
13.08.1983 – ??:??h

== Abbreviations ==
- All results shown are in metres

Q	automatic qualification
q	qualification by rank
DNS	did not start
NM	no mark
WR	world record
AR	area record
NR	national record
PB	personal best
SB	season best

== Records ==
Standing records prior to the 1983 World Athletics Championships
World Record	Tiina Lillak (FIN)	74.76 m	June 13, 1983	Tampere, Finland
Event Record	New event			
Season Best	Tiina Lillak (FIN)	74.76 m	June 13, 1983	Tampere, Finland

== Qualification ==
=== Group A ===
Rank	Overall	Athlete	Attempts			Distance
Rank	Overall	Athlete	1	2	3	Distance
1	3	Tessa Sanderson (GBR)	64.80	—	—	64.80 m
2	4	Petra Felke (GDR)	60.08	57.80	64.46	64.46 m
3	5	Mayra Vila (CUB)	53.44	60.46	62.78	62.78 m
4	7	Tuula Laaksalo (FIN)	62.06	—	—	62.06 m
5	13	Karin Bergdahl (SWE)	60.64	X	59.14	60.64 m
6	14	Ingrid Thyssen (FRG)	58.84	56.16	59.70	59.70 m
7	16	Elena Burgárová (TCH)	57.30	58.48	56.40	58.48 m
8	18	Monique Lapres (CAN)	51.48	54.70	48.70	54.70 m
9	19	Xin Xiaoli (CHN)	49.70	44.62	52.52	52.52 m
10	21	Jennifer Pace (MLT)	40.72	41.96	41.52	41.96 m
—	—	Sofia Sakorafa (GRE)	—	—	—	DNS

=== Group B ===
Rank	Overall	Athlete	Attempts			Distance
Rank	Overall	Athlete	1	2	3	Distance
1	1	Tiina Lillak (FIN)	58.14	69.16	—	69.16 m
2	2	Anna Verouli (GRE)	68.50	—	—	68.50 m
3	6	Antje Kempe (GDR)	62.74	—	—	62.74 m
4	8	Éva Ráduly-Zörgő (ROU)	61.92	59.14	60.54	61.92 m
5	9	Karin Smith (USA)	61.48	58.90	58.92	61.48 m
6	10	Beate Peters (FRG)	57.10	60.00	61.18	61.18 m
7	11	María Caridad Colón (CUB)	60.98	X	55.08	60.98 m
8	12	Fatima Whitbread (GBR)	X	57.34	60.96	60.96 m
9	15	Fausta Quintavalla (ITA)	59.34	53.68	58.00	59.34 m
10	17	Emi Matsui (JPN)	X	55.52	53.10	55.52 m
11	20	Mereoni Vibose (FIJ)	49.00	48.48	49.44	49.44 m
12	22	Norsham Yoon (MAS)	40.40	X	37.00	40.40 m

== Final ==
Rank	Athlete	Attempts						Distance
Rank	Athlete	1	2	3	4	5	6	Distance
1st place, gold medalist(s)	Tiina Lillak (FIN)	67.34	59.04	63.24	63.56	67.46	70.82	70.82 m
2nd place, silver medalist(s)	Fatima Whitbread (GBR)	69.14	X	64.48	X	61.78	X	69.14 m
3rd place, bronze medalist(s)	Anna Verouli (GRE)	X	61.74	62.38	63.08	65.72	X	65.72 m
4	Tessa Sanderson (GBR)	64.76	63.66	63.94	64.10	64.00	59.74	64.76 m
5	Éva Ráduly-Zörgő (ROU)	63.38	60.32	57.36	60.92	63.86	61.80	63.86 m
6	Tuula Laaksalo (FIN)	50.50	62.44	X	56.52	X	59.04	62.44 m
7	Beate Peters (FRG)	59.22	X	62.42	X	59.30	X	62.42 m
8	María Caridad Colón (CUB)	61.52	62.04	56.96	57.34	57.88	56.32	62.04 m
9	Petra Felke (GDR)	X	61.82	62.02				62.02 m
10	Karin Smith (USA)	56.76	X	59.76				59.76 m
11	Antje Kempe (GDR)	58.82	X	54.84				58.82 m
12	Mayra Vila (CUB)	57.60	53.72	57.80				57.80 m

== See also ==
- 1980 Women's Olympic Javelin Throw (Moscow)
- 1982 Women's European Championships Javelin Throw (Athens)
- 1984 Women's Olympic Javelin Throw (Los Angeles)
- 1986 Women's European Championships Javelin Throw (Stuttgart)
- 1988 Women's Olympic Javelin Throw (Seoul)
