= Athletics at the 1979 Pan American Games – Women's javelin throw =

Women's javelin throw at the 1979 Pan American Games
- Venue: Estadio Sixto Escobar
- Dates: 14 July
- Winning distance: 62.30

Medalists
Gold medal	María Caridad Colón	Cuba
Silver medal	Lynn Cannon	United States
Bronze medal	Cathy Sulinski	United States

The women's javelin throw competition of the athletics events at the 1979 Pan American Games took place on 14 July at the Estadio Sixto Escobar. The defending Pan American Games champion was Sherry Calbert of the United States.

== Records ==
Prior to this competition, the existing world and Pan American Games records were as follows:

World record	Ruth Fuchs (GDR)	69.52	Dresden, East Germany	June 13, 1979
Pan American Games record	Sherry Calvert (USA)	54.70	Mexico City, Mexico	1975

== Results ==
All distances shown are in meters.

KEY:	WR	World Record	GR	Pan American Record

=== Final ===
Rank	Name	Nationality	Distance	Notes
1st place, gold medalist(s)	María Caridad Colón	Cuba	62.30	GR
2nd place, silver medalist(s)	Lynn Cannon	United States	56.48	
3rd place, bronze medalist(s)	Cathy Sulinski	United States	56.44	
4	Laurie Kern	Canada	55.70	
5	Marli dos Santos	Brazil	52.66	
6	Ana Núñez	Cuba	48.84	
7	Sonia Smith	Bermuda	46.54	
8	Victoria López	Puerto Rico	41.14	
	Céline Chartrand	Canada	DNS	
