= Athletics at the Friendship Games – Women's javelin throw =

The women's javelin throw event at the Friendship Games was held on 16 August 1984 at the Evžen Rošický Stadium in Prague, Czechoslovakia.

== Results ==
Rank	Name	Nationality	#1	#2	#3	#4	#5	#6	Result	Notes
1st place, gold medalist(s)	Petra Felke	East Germany	x	73.30	68.02	67.86	72.12	69.92	73.30	
2nd place, silver medalist(s)	Antoaneta Todorova	Bulgaria	56.24	55.50	65.40	x	57.70	64.54	65.40	
3rd place, bronze medalist(s)	María Caridad Colón	Cuba	64.34	61.62	64.24	59.14	63.08	61.92	64.34	
4	Antje Kempe	East Germany							61.64	
5	Mayra Vila	Cuba							60.84	
6	Elena Révayová	Czechoslovakia							60.80	
7	Elena Burgárová	Czechoslovakia							60.40	
8	Natalya Kolenchukova	Soviet Union							59.74	
9	Iris De Grasse	Cuba							59.72	
10	Zinaida Gavrilina	Soviet Union							59.72	
11	Katalin Hartai	Hungary							54.88	
12	Veronika Längle	Austria							54.84	
13	Vilma Vidotti	Italy							45.34	

== See also ==
- Athletics at the 1984 Summer Olympics – Women's javelin throw
