= Athletics at the 1984 Summer Olympics – Women's javelin throw =

Women's javelin throw at the Games of the XXIII Olympiad
- Venue: Los Angeles Memorial Coliseum
- Date: 5 August 1984 (qualifications); 6 August 1984 (final)
- Competitors: 24 from 18 nations
- Winning distance: 69.56 OR

Medalists
1st place, gold medalist(s)		Tessa Sanderson; Great Britain
2nd place, silver medalist(s)		Tiina Lillak; Finland
3rd place, bronze medalist(s)		Fatima Whitbread; Great Britain

The Women's Javelin Throw event at the 1984 Summer Olympics in Los Angeles, California had an entry list of 29 competitors, with two qualifying groups (29 throwers) before the final (12) took place on Monday August 6, 1984. The top 12 and ties, and all those reaching 60.00 metres advanced to the final. All results were made with a rough surfaced javelin (old design).

== Medalists ==
Gold	Tessa Sanderson; Great Britain
Silver	Tiina Lillak; Finland
Bronze	Fatima Whitbread; Great Britain

== Abbreviations ==
- All results shown are in metres

Q	automatic qualification
q	qualification by rank
DNS	did not start
NM	no mark
WR	world record
OR	olympic record
AR	area record
NR	national record
PB	personal best
SB	season best

== Records ==
Standing records prior to the 1984 Summer Olympics
World Record	Tiina Lillak (FIN)	74.76 m	June 13, 1983	Tampere, Finland
Olympic Record	María Caridad Colón (CUB)	68.40 m	July 25, 1980	Moscow, Soviet Union
Broken records during the 1984 Summer Olympics
Olympic Record	Tessa Sanderson (GBR)	69.56 m	August 6, 1984	Los Angeles, United States

== Qualification ==
=== Group A ===
Rank	Overall	Athlete	Attempts			Distance	Note
Rank	Overall	Athlete	1	2	3	Distance	Note
1	1	Fatima Whitbread (GBR)	X	X	65.30	65.30 m	
2	2	Tiina Lillak (FIN)	63.30	—	—	63.30 m	
3	7	Karin Smith (USA)	61.38	—	—	61.38 m	
4	9	Ingrid Thyssen (FRG)	60.86	—	—	60.86 m	
5	10	Tuula Laaksalo (FIN)	59.64	60.42	—	60.42 m	
6	11	Petra Rivers (AUS)	54.28	59.12	—	59.12 m	
7	14	Emi Matsui (JPN)	55.92	57.72	55.94	57.72 m	
8	15	Fausta Quintavalla (ITA)	56.48	57.66	55.66	57.66 m	
9	17	Agnès Tchuinté (CMR)	55.94	X	51.86	55.94 m	
10	18	Lynda Sutfin (USA)	55.70	51.36	55.92	55.92 m	
11	21	Lee Hui-cheng (TPE)	51.18	52.46	49.54	52.46 m	
12	22	Íris Grönfeldt (ISL)	47.34	48.70	48.16	48.70 m	
13	23	Jennifer Pace (MLT)	47.92	X	47.68	47.92 m	

=== Group B ===
Rank	Overall	Athlete	Attempts			Distance	Note
Rank	Overall	Athlete	1	2	3	Distance	Note
1	3	Trine Solberg (NOR)	62.68	—	—	62.68 m	
2	4	Helena Laine (FIN)	X	61.80	—	61.80 m	
3	5	Tessa Sanderson (GBR)	61.58	—	—	61.58 m	
4	6	Beate Peters (FRG)	61.56	—	—	61.56 m	
5	8	Sharon Gibson (GBR)	60.88	—	—	60.88 m	
6	12	Cathy Sulinski (USA)	54.32	X	59.00	59.00 m	
7	13	Regula Egger (SUI)	56.32	57.80	57.88	57.88 m	
8	16	Minori Mori (JPN)	46.66	56.60	X	56.60 m	
9	19	Zhu Hongyang (CHN)	53.18	50.98	X	53.18 m	
10	20	Sonia Smith (BER)	51.48	X	52.74	52.74 m	
—	—	Anna Verouli (GRE)	57.72	X	58.62	DSQ	
—	—	Iamo Launa (PNG)	—	—	—	DNS	

== Final ==
Rank	Athlete	Attempts						Distance	Note
Rank	Athlete	1	2	3	4	5	6	Distance	Note
1st place, gold medalist(s)	Tessa Sanderson (GBR)	69.56	66.56	63.68	64.84	66.86	64.10	69.56 m	OR
2nd place, silver medalist(s)	Tiina Lillak (FIN)	61.14	69.00	X	X	X	X	69.00 m	
3rd place, bronze medalist(s)	Fatima Whitbread (GBR)	64.52	65.42	X	65.82	67.14	X	67.14 m	
4	Tuula Laaksalo (FIN)	56.42	61.36	X	66.40	59.64	65.72	66.40 m	
5	Trine Solberg (NOR)	64.52	60.90	X	X	X	X	64.52 m	
6	Ingrid Thyssen (FRG)	61.12	63.26	55.64	55.96	60.42	56.26	63.26 m	
7	Beate Peters (FRG)	61.84	59.90	X	61.24	57.98	62.34	62.34 m	
8	Karin Smith (USA)	60.54	X	55.92	59.14	X	62.06	62.06 m	
9	Sharon Gibson (GBR)	54.96	X	59.66				59.66 m	
10	Cathy Sulinski (USA)	54.26	58.38	X				58.38 m	
11	Helena Laine (FIN)	X	X	58.18				58.18 m	
12	Petra Rivers (AUS)	55.66	56.20	X				56.20 m	

== See also ==
- 1982 Women's European Championships Javelin Throw (Athens)
- 1983 Women's World Championships Javelin Throw (Helsinki)
- 1984 Women's Friendship Games Javelin Throw (Prague)
- 1984 Javelin Throw Year Ranking
- 1986 Women's European Championships Javelin Throw (Stuttgart)
- 1987 Women's World Championships Javelin Throw (Rome)
