= Athletics at the 1983 Pan American Games – Women's javelin throw =

Women's javelin throw at the Pan American Games

The women's javelin throw event at the 1983 Pan American Games was held in Caracas, Venezuela on 26 August.

== Results ==
Rank	Name	Nationality	Result	Notes
1st place, gold medalist(s)	María Caridad Colón	Cuba	63.76	
2nd place, silver medalist(s)	Mayra Vila	Cuba	63.32	
3rd place, bronze medalist(s)	Marieta Riera	Venezuela	53.60	
4	Monique Lapres	Canada	52.36	
5	Patty Kearney	United States	52.00	
6	Mariela Riera	Venezuela	49.90	
7	Deanna Carr	United States	46.16	
