= Mayra Vila =

Cuban athlete (born 1960)

Personal information
- Full name: Mayra Vila Machado
- Born: 5 June 1960 (age 66) Santa Clara, Cuba

Sport
- Sport: Athletics
- Event: Javelin throw
Medal record
Representing Cuba
Pan American Games
| Silver medal – second place | 1983 Caracas | Javelin throw |
Central American and Caribbean Games
| Silver medal – second place | 1982 Havana | Javelin throw |
Summer Universiade
| Bronze medal – third place | 1979 Mexico City | Javelin throw |
| Bronze medal – third place | 1981 Bucharest | Javelin throw |
| Bronze medal – third place | 1983 Edmonton | Javelin throw |

Mayra Vila Machado (born 5 June 1960) is a retired Cuban athlete who specialised in the javelin throw. She represented her country at the inaugural World Championships in Helsinki finishing 12th in the final. She won multiple medals at regional level.

Her personal best with the old model of javelin is 70.14 metres set in Madrid in 1985.

== International competitions ==
| Year | Competition | Venue | Position | Event | Notes |
Representing Cuba
| 1978 | Central American and Caribbean; Junior Championships (U20) | Xalapa, Mexico | 1st | Javelin throw | 48.96 m |
| 1979 | Central American and Caribbean Championships | Guadalajara, Mexico | 2nd | Javelin throw | 49.36 m |
| 1979 | Universiade | Mexico City, Mexico | 3rd | Javelin throw | 60.98 m |
| 1981 | Central American and Caribbean Championships | Santo Domingo, Dominican Republic | 2nd | Javelin throw | 56.80 m |
| 1981 | Universiade | Bucharest, Romania | 3rd | Javelin throw | 63.88 m |
| 1981 | World Cup | Rome, Italy | 5th | Javelin throw | 59.00 m^{1} |
| 1982 | Central American and Caribbean Games | Havana, Cuba | 2nd | Javelin throw | 60.22 m |
| 1983 | Universiade | Edmonton, Canada | 3rd | Javelin throw | 62.34 m |
| 1983 | World Championships | Helsinki, Finland | 12th | Javelin throw | 57.80 m |
| 1983 | Pan American Games | Caracas, Venezuela | 2nd | Javelin throw | 63.32 m |
| 1984 | Friendship Games | Prague, Czechoslovakia | 5th | Javelin throw | 60.84 m |
| 1985 | Central American and Caribbean Championships | Nassau, Bahamas | 1st | Javelin throw | 63.38 m |

^{1}Representing the Americas
