= María Beltrán =

Cuban athlete

Personal information
- Born: 17 January 1956 (age 70)

Sport
- Sport: Athletics
- Event: Javelin throw
Medal record
Representing Cuba
Pan American Games
| Silver medal – second place | 1975 Mexico City | Javelin throw |
Central American and Caribbean Games
| Silver medal – second place | 1974 Santiago | Javelin throw |
| Silver medal – second place | 1978 Medellin | Javelin throw |

María Beltrán (born 17 January 1956) is a retired Cuban athlete who competed primarily in the javelin throw. She won a silver medal at the 1975 Pan American Games.

Her personal best with the old model javelin is 61.80 metres set in Helsinki in 1983.

== International competitions ==
| Year | Competition | Venue | Position | Event | Notes |
Representing Cuba
| 1974 | Central American and Caribbean Games | Santo Domingo, Dominican Republic | 2nd | Javelin throw | 47.46 m |
| 1975 | Pan American Games | Mexico City, Mexico | 2nd | Javelin throw | 54.36 m |
| 1977 | Central American and Caribbean Championships | Xalapa, Mexico | 1st | Javelin throw | 53.86 m |
| 1977 | Universiade | Sofia, Bulgaria | 11th | Javelin throw | 52.20 m |
| 1978 | Central American and Caribbean Games | Medellín, Colombia | 2nd | Javelin throw | 54.86 m |
| 1981 | Central American and Caribbean Championships | Santo Domingo, Dominican Republic | 1st | Javelin throw | 59.06 m |
| 1981 | Universiade | Bucharest, Romania | 8th | Javelin throw | 58.62 m |
| 1983 | Central American and Caribbean Championships | Havana, Cuba | 2nd | Javelin throw | 56.40 m |
