= Ioannis Tsintsaris =

Greek weightlifter (1962–2017)

Personal information
- Native name: Γιάννης Τσιντσάρης
- Nationality: Greek
- Born: 8 February 1962 Sidirokastro, Greece
- Died: 28 February 2017 (aged 55)
- Education: Athens Physical Education and Sports College
- Occupations: Olympic Weightlifter, Weightlifting Coach
- Height: 5 ft 7.5 in (171 cm)
- Weight: 287 lb (130 kg)
- Spouse: Anna Verouli (1984-1988)

Sport
- Country: Greece
- Sport: Weightlifting
- Weight class: Super Heavyweight
- Coached by: Antonis Arvanitidis (1988)
- Retired: 1993

Achievements and titles
- Highest world ranking: 4th place, Summer Olympics 1984

Ioannis Tsintsaris (8 February 1962 – 28 February 2017) was a Greek weightlifter who competed at the 1984 Summer Olympics. He was married to javelin thrower Anna Verouli from 1984 to 1988. In 1993, he retired from his Olympic career, and in 1996, he became a weightlifting coach in Sidirokastro up until 2008.
