= Ute Hommola =

East German javelin thrower

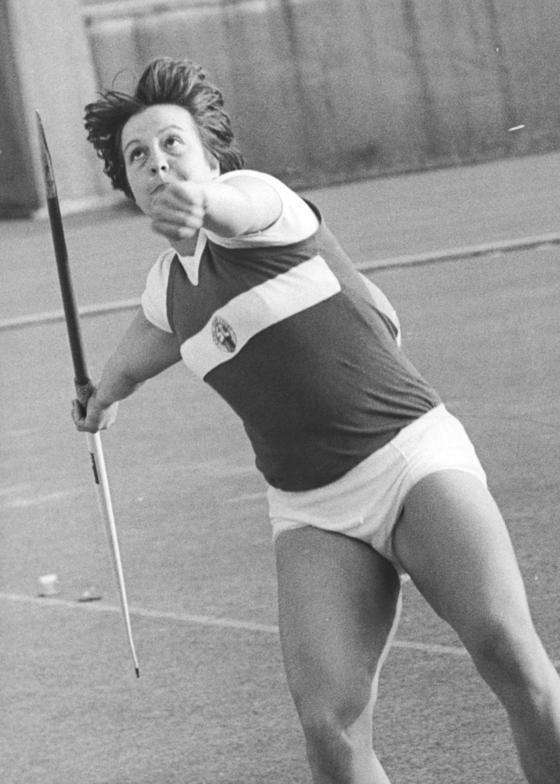
- Ute Hommola

Personal information
- Nationality: East Germany
- Born: 20 January 1952 (age 74) Weißenborn, Saxony, East Germany
- Height: 1.74 m (5 ft 9 in)
- Weight: 74 kg (163 lb)

Sport
- Country: East Germany
- Sport: Athletics
- Event: Javelin throw
- Club: SC Chemie Halle

Achievements and titles
- Personal best: 67.24 m (1981)
Medal record
Women's athletics
Representing East Germany
Olympic Games
Bronze medal – third place	1980 Moscow	Javelin throw
European Championships
Bronze medal – third place	1978 Prague	Javelin throw

Ute Hommola (born 20 January 1952 in Weißenborn, Saxony) is a former German athlete who mainly competed in the women's javelin throw event.

She competed for East Germany at the 1980 Summer Olympics held in Moscow, Russia where she won the bronze medal in the javelin throw event.
