= Marion Becker =

German javelin thrower (born 1950)

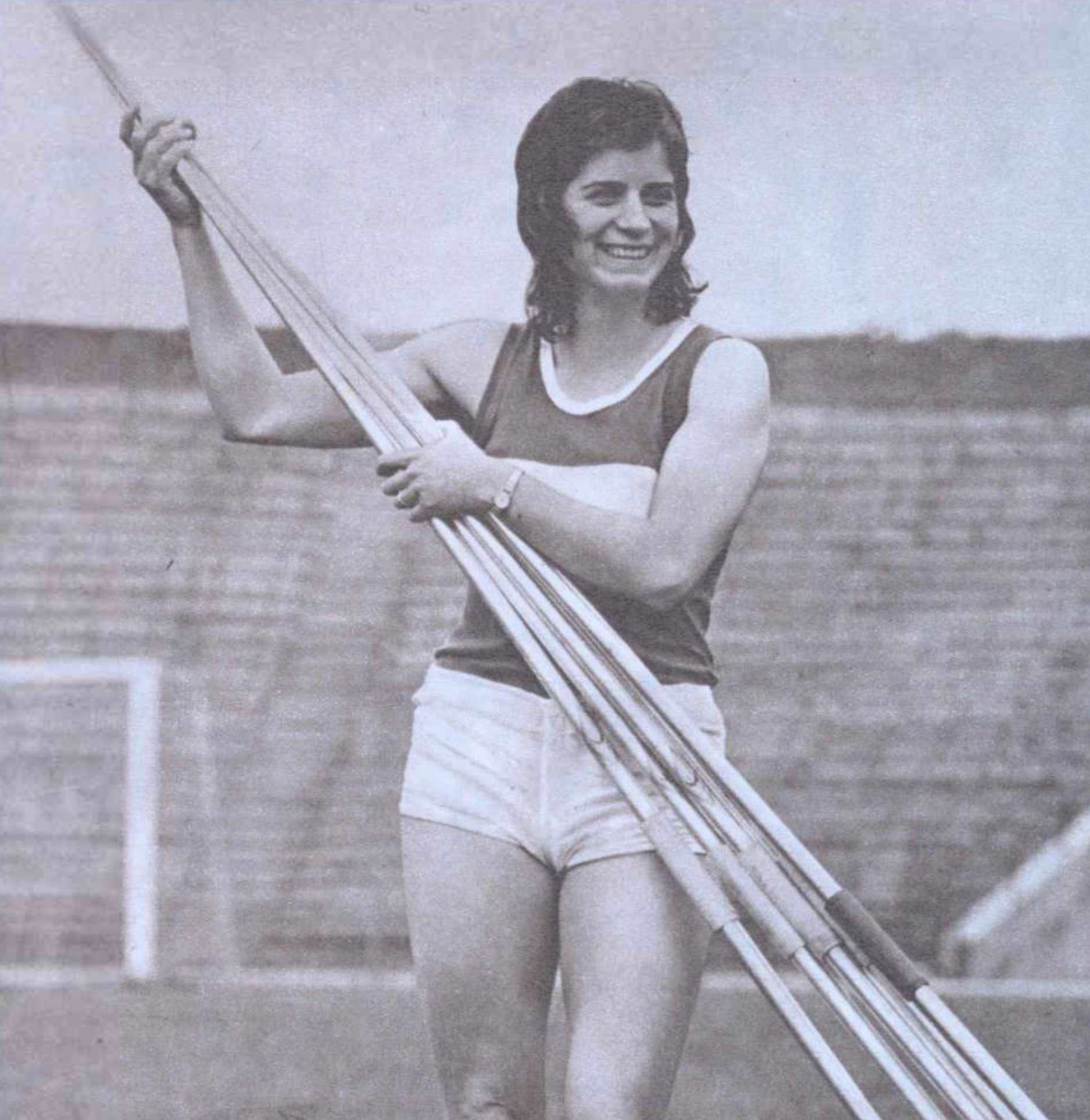

Personal information
- Born: Marion Steiner; 21 January 1950 (age 76) Hamburg, West Germany
- Height: 1.67 m (5 ft 6 in)
- Weight: 63 kg (139 lb)

Sport
- Sport: Athletics
- Event: Javelin throw

Achievements and titles
- Personal best: 65.14 m (1976)
Medal record
Representing West Germany
Women's Track and field
Silver medal – second place	1976 Montreal	Javelin

Marion Becker (née Steiner, 21 January 1950) is a German athlete who competed mainly in the javelin throw.

== Biography ==
She competed in the women's javelin throw at the 1972 Summer Olympics, representing Romania.

Becker competed for West Germany in the 1976 Summer Olympics in the javelin throw, where she won the silver medal with a throw of 220.5 ft (67.2 m), breaking the previous Olympic Record of 209.7 ft (63.9 m) set at the Munich Olympics in 1972 by Ruth Fuchs.
