= Lee Hui-cheng =

Taiwanese athlete

Personal information
- Full name: 李惠貞, Pinyin: Lǐ Huì-zhēn
- Nationality: Taiwanese
- Born: 26 November 1967 (age 58)

Sport
- Sport: Athletics
- Event: Javelin throw

Lee Hui-cheng (born 26 November 1967) is a Taiwanese athlete. She competed in the women's javelin throw at the 1984 Summer Olympics.
