= Tatyana Biryulina =

Uzbek javelin thrower

Personal information
- Nationality: Uzbek
- Born: 16 July 1955 (age 70) Tashkent, Uzbek SSR, USSR
- Height: 165 cm (5 ft 5 in)
- Weight: 72 kg (159 lb)

Sport
- Club: Burevestnik (Tashkent)
- Coached by: Efim Shapiro, Alexander Vink

Tatyana Biryulina (born 16 July 1955) is a Soviet female javelin thrower. She participated in the 1980 Summer Olympics and held the world record in 1980–1981. She was the first woman in history to throw the javelin over 70 meters.

== Biography ==
Tatyana Biryulina was born in Tashkent, Uzbek SSR (now Uzbekistan).

She completed her secondary education at School No. 175 in Tashkent. In 1974, she graduated from a culinary school, and in 1978, she graduated from the Uzbek State Institute of Physical Education. Her profession was that of an educator.

Tatyana began her involvement in athletics in 1966, initially competing in the Pioneer Pentathlon. In 1970, she started javelin throwing. From 1966 to 1974, she trained under the guidance of Efim Borisovich Shapiro, and from 1974, she trained under the renowned coach of the Uzbek SSR, Александра Александровича Винка . She represented "Burevestnik" from Tashkent in athletics competitions.

In 1976 she won a silver medal at the All-Union Student Games in Kyiv. In 1979, she secured the bronze at the Memorial of the Znamensky Brothers. However, she never won medals in the USSR Athletics Championships.

In 1979 Tatyana participated in the Summer Universiade in Mexico. She finished 5th in javelin throwing with a result of 57.6 meters, trailing behind the gold medalist, Eva Raduli-Zorgo of Romania, by 9.60 meters.

On 12 July 1980, at the pre-Olympic Open Championship of Moscow in Podolsk, she set a world record by throwing the javelin 70.08 meters. Biryulina became the first woman in the world to surpass the 70-meter mark. This record stood for more than a year until Antoneta Todorova of Bulgaria exceeded it by 1.80 meters on 15 August 1981.

In 1980 she was part of the Soviet national team at the Summer Olympics in Moscow. In javelin throwing, she failed to meet the 60-meter standard, recording a result of 59.86 meters. Nevertheless, as only nine participants met the standard, she made it to the final in 11th place. In the final, she finished 6th with a result of 65.08 meters, falling 3.32 meters short of the gold medalist, Maria Colon from Cuba. Her 6th-place finish marked the first Olympic achievement in the history of Uzbekistani athletics. Tatyana Biryulina was awarded the title of "Master of Sports of the USSR of International Class" in 1980.

== Personal records ==
Javelin throw: 70.08 meters (12 July 1980, Podolsk).

Sporting positions
Preceded by (East Germany) Ruth Fuchs	Women's Javelin Best Year Performance; 1980	Succeeded by (Bulgaria) Antoaneta Todorova
