= Masters W45 javelin world record progression =

Javelin throw world records managed by World Masters Athletics

Masters W45 javelin world record progression is the progression of world record improvements of the javelin throw W45 division of Masters athletics. Records must be set in properly conducted, official competitions under the standing IAAF rules unless modified by World Masters Athletics. The W45 division consists of female athletes who have reached the age of 45 but have not yet reached the age of 50, so exactly from their 45th birthday to the day before their 50th birthday. The W45 division throws exactly the same 600 g implement as the Open division. These competitors all threw their records in open competition.

Key

Incomplete information Pending

Distance	Athlete	Nationality	Birthdate	Location	Date
53.89	Indrė Jakubaitytė	Lithuania	24 January 1976	Jelgava	16 May 2021
53.88	Lavern Eve	Bahamas	16 June 1965	Nassau	26 June 2010
50.47	Elisabeth Wahlander	Sweden	14 March 1960	Helsingborg	21 August 2005
47.23	Sofia Sakorafa	Greece	29 April 1957	Hania	28 June 2004
43.10	Isabelle Accambray	France	9 July 1956	Cannes	15 May 2003
42.99	Ibolya Torma Paech	Hungary	22 September 1955	Tata	20 July 2002
40.83	Elisabeth Dubowski Wormsen	Norway	11 February 1955	Notodden	23 September 2000
37.79	Jean Lintern	United Kingdom	13 March 1951	Gateshead	29 July 1999

== Old javelin ==
Distance	Athlete	Nationality	Birthdate	Age	Location	Date	Ref
47.74 m	Anneliese Gerhards	Germany	4 July 1935	45 years, 330 days	Düsseldorf	30 May 1981	
