= Cathy Sulinski =

American javelin thrower (born 1958)

Personal information
- Full name: Catherine Ann Sulinski
- Born: April 3, 1958 (age 68) San Francisco, California, U.S.
- Height: 5 ft 9 in (1.75 m)

Sport
- Event: Javelin throw
Medal record
Women's athletics
Representing United States
Pan American Games
| Bronze medal – third place | 1979 San Juan | Javelin throw |
Pacific Conference Games
| Gold medal – first place | 1985 Berkeley | Javelin throw |

Catherine Ann Sulinski (born April 3, 1958, in San Francisco, California) is a retired javelin thrower from the United States. She competed for her native country at the 1984 Summer Olympics, finishing in tenth place (58.38 metres) in the final.

She competed in the AIAW for the Chico State Wildcats and the Cal State Hayward track and field teams.

== International competitions ==
| Year | Competition | Venue | Position | Notes |
Representing the United States
| 1979 | Pan American Games | San Juan, Puerto Rico | 3rd | 55.82 m |
| 1984 | Olympic Games | Los Angeles, United States | 10th | 58.38 m |
