= Zhu Hongyang =

Chinese javelin thrower

Personal information
- Nationality: Chinese
- Born: 11 February 1964 (age 62) China

Sport
- Sport: Athletics
- Event: Javelin throw
Medal record
Women's athletics
Representing China
Asian Championships
Gold medal – first place	1985 Jakarta	Javelin throw

Zhu Hongyang (born 11 February 1964) is a Chinese athlete. She competed in the women's javelin throw at the 1984 Summer Olympics.
