= Minori Mori =

Japanese javelin thrower

Personal information
- Nationality: Japanese
- Born: 9 December 1957 (age 68)

Sport
- Sport: Athletics
- Event: Javelin throw

Minori Mori (森 美乃里, Mori Minori; born 9 December 1957) is a Japanese athlete. She competed in the women's javelin throw at the 1984 Summer Olympics.
