= Ingrid Thyssen =

German javelin thrower

Personal information
- Born: 9 September 1956 (age 69) Aachen, West Germany

Sport
- Sport: Track and field

Ingrid Anna Thyssen (born 9 September 1956) is a retired West German javelin thrower.

== Competition Results ==
She finished seventh at the 1978 European Championships.

She competed at the 1983 World Championships without reaching the final.

She finished sixth at the 1984 Summer Olympics.

She seventh at the 1986 European Championships.

She finished ninth at the 1987 World Championships.

She finished eighth at the 1988 Summer Olympics.

She finished sixth at the 1990 European Championships.

== West German Champion ==
She became West German champion eight times, in the years 1979–1984, 1987, and 1988.

== Club Teams ==
She represented the clubs TG Aachen, ASV Köln, and LG Bayer Leverkusen.

== Personal Best Throw ==
Her personal best throw was 69.68 metres with the old javelin type, achieved in August 1987 in West Berlin.

This ranks her eighth among German old-type-javelin throwers, behind Petra Felke (who held the world record), Antje Kempe, Silke Renk, Beate Koch, Karen Forkel, Tanja Damaske, and Ruth Fuchs.
