= Sofia Sakorafa =

Greek politician and athlete

- Σοφία Σακοράφα
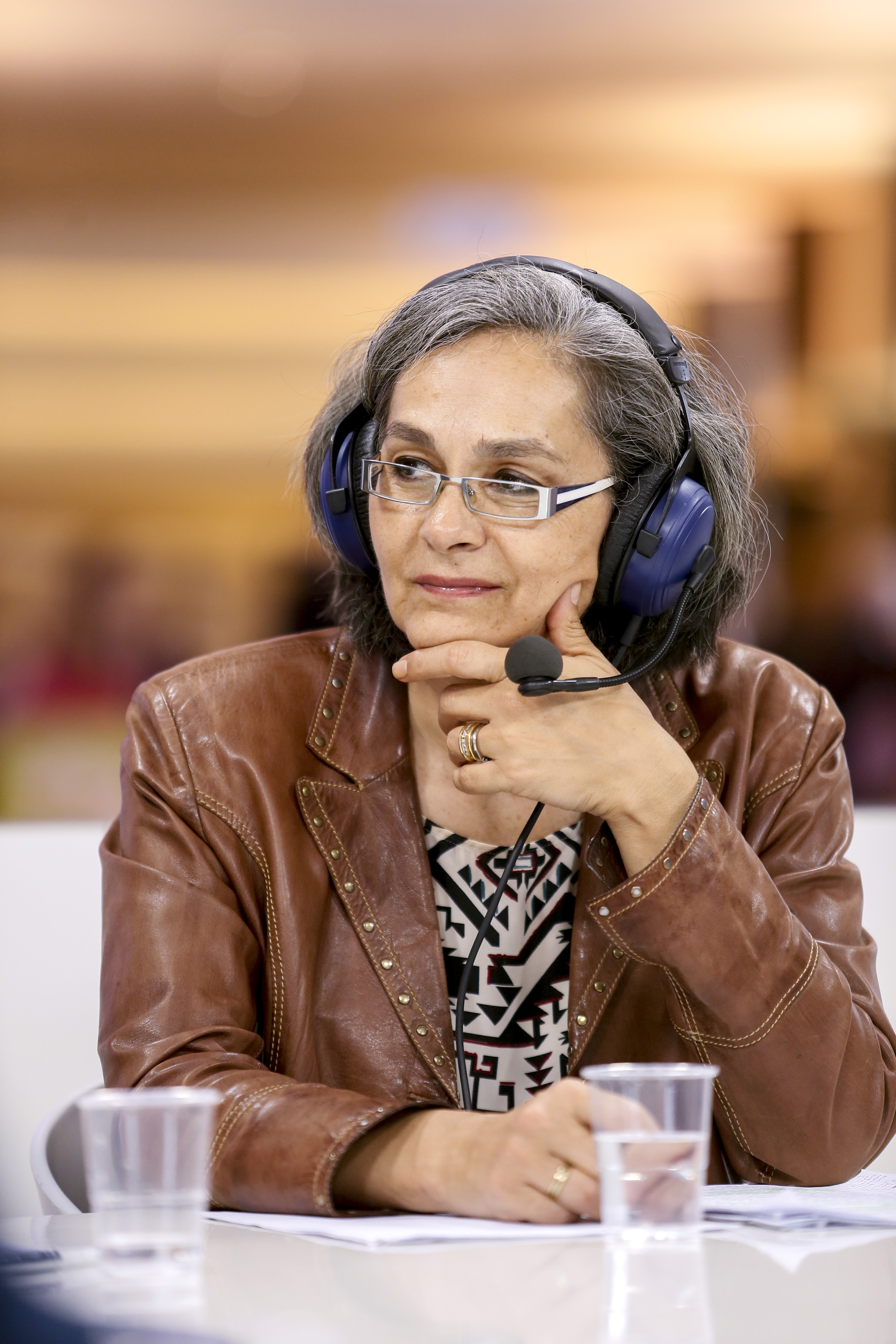
- Sakorafa, 2016

Deputy Speaker of the Hellenic Parliament
- In office 18 July 2019 – 21 May 2023 Serving with Nikitas Kaklamanis, Haralambos Athanasiou, Athanasios Bouras, Dimitris Vitsas, Odysseas Konstantinopoulos, Giorgos Lambroulis, and Apostolos Avdelas
- Speaker: Konstantinos Tasoulas

Member of the Hellenic Parliament
- In office 8 July 2019 – 21 May 2023
- Constituency: Athens B3
- In office 17 June 2012 – 5 May 2014
- Succeeded by: Fotini Kouvela
- Constituency: Athens B

Member of the European Parliament
- In office 1 July 2014 – 2 July 2019
- Constituency: Greece

Personal details
- Born: 29 April 1957 (age 69) Trikala, Thessaly, Kingdom of Greece
- Citizenship: Greek; Palestinian
- Party: PASOK (2000–2010); Syriza (2012–2015); Independent (2015–2018); MeRA25 (2018–2023)
- Education: Aristotle University of Thessaloniki
- Occupation: Politician
- Sports career
- Country: Greece
- Sport: Women's Javelin
Medal record
Women's athletics
Representing Greece
European Championships
Bronze medal – third place	1982 Athens	Javelin
Mediterranean Games
Gold medal – first place	1979 Split	Javelin
Bronze medal – third place	1987 Latakia	Javelin

Sofia Sakorafa (Greek: Σοφία Σακοράφα, born 29 April 1957 in Trikala, Greece) is a Greek-Palestinian politician and former javelin thrower. She was a Member of the European Parliament for Greece as member of the political party MeRA25, having formerly sat for Syriza and before that served, from June 2012 to July 2014, as a Syriza Member of the Hellenic Parliament. She served as a deputy speaker in the Hellenic Parliament for the MeRA25 party. She is the president of Association hellénique d'athlétisme amateur (SEGAS).

== Education ==
Sakorafa graduated in physical education from the Aristotle University of Thessaloniki.

== Athletics ==
She started competing in athletics as a member of Trikala Gymnastic Club. She competed in the 1976 and 1980 Summer Olympics.

She won the bronze medal at the 1982 European Championships in Athens. In 1983, after winning the Balkan Games, she had achieved the third performance of the year with a throw of 72.28 m, but eventually had to withdraw from the World Championships in Helsinki, due to injury.

She was named the Greek Female Athlete of the Year for 1981 and co-Athlete of the Year with javelin thrower Anna Verouli for 1982.

=== Competition record ===
Year	Competition	Venue	Position	Notes
RepresentingGreece
1976	Olympic Games	Montreal, Canada	-	NM
1978	European Championships	Prague, Czechoslovakia	13th (q)	56.76 m
1979	Mediterranean Games	Split, Yugoslavia	1st	57.96 m GR
1980	Olympic Games	Moscow, Soviet Union	-	NM
1982	Balkan Games	Bucharest, Romania	1st	62.08 m
1982	European Championships	Athens, Greece	3rd	67.04 m
1983	Balkan Games	İzmir, Turkey	1st	71.28 m CR
1983	World Championships	Helsinki, Finland	-	DNS
1986	Balkan Games	Ljubljana, Yugoslavia	1st	61.00 m
1987	Mediterranean Games	Latakia, Syria	3rd	57.16 m
RepresentingPalestine
2004	Venizelia	Chania, Greece	4th	47.23 m MW45WR
(q) Indicates overall position in qualifying round

=== 2004 Olympics ===
Sakorafa stirred controversy in 2004 when she became a Palestinian citizen and applied a few months before the Olympic Games for a berth on the Palestinian Olympic team at the age of 47. She made her debut representing Palestine in Chania, Crete, on 28 June 2004 - her performance was 47.23 metres. Despite the fact that her gesture to participate as a Palestinian was symbolic, the IAAF ruled her ineligible for the 2004 Summer Olympics.

== Professional career ==
Sakorafa worked in as a secondary teacher of physical education before working as a freelance. From 1994 to 1996, she served as an adviser to the sports minister and as Chairman of the Commission for Sport and Woman.

== Political career ==
She has served on the City Councils of Athens, from 1994 to 1998, and Maroussi, from 1998 to 2006. She was elected as a member of the Hellenic Parliament under the banner of PASOK three times (in the elections of 2000, 2007 and 2009). She failed to win a seat in parliament following the 2004 elections.

On 6 May 2010 she refused to vote in favour of the austerity measures and the loan agreement between the Greek government and the IMF/EU. As a result, she was expelled from PASOK. She served as an independent member of the parliament until 2012.

She participated in the 2012 legislative elections as a member of Syriza and was elected in Athens B. In the Shadow Cabinet of Alexis Tsipras, she had responsibility for the interior. She resigned from the Hellenic Parliament in May 2014 in order to contest the European Parliament election.

In the 2014 European Parliament elections, she was elected as a Member of European Parliament for Greece, representing Syriza. She is a member of the Committee on Foreign Affairs, the Committee on Petitions and is a substitute for the Committee on Industry, Research and Energy. Since 16 October 2014, she has been the chair of the Delegation for relations with the countries of Central America, having previously been a member. She is therefore also a member of the Conference of Delegation Chairs.

On 28 September 2015, Sakorafa left Syriza to sit as an independent within the GUE/NGL grouping. She resigned from Syriza over disagreements with the leadership over the introduction of further austerity measures in Greece. She said: "It's clear that I cannot support any government nor any policies that involve measures that harm the people."

In December 2018 Sofia Sakorafa joined the Greek party MeRA25. On 26 May 2019, she lost reelection as a member of the European Parliament as member of MeRA25.

Sporting positions
Preceded by (Bulgaria) Antoaneta Todorova	Women's Javelin Best Year Performance; 1982	Succeeded by (Finland) Tiina Lillak
