= Saida Gunba =

Soviet javelin thrower (1959–2018)

Personal information
- Native name: Georgian: საიდა გუმბა
- Born: Saida Kanosovna Gunba; 30 August 1959 Sukhumi, Georgian SSR
- Died: 24 November 2018 (aged 59) Pitsunda, Abkhazia

Sport
- Club: Burevestnik Tbilisi
Medal record
Women's Track and field
Silver medal – second place	1980 Moscow	Javelin

Saida Kanosovna Gunba (Georgian: საიდა გუმბა; 30 August 1959 – 24 November 2018) was a Soviet javelin thrower. Gunba was affiliated with Burevestnik Tbilisi.

She competed for the USSR at the 1980 Summer Olympics held in Moscow, where she won the silver medal in the women's javelin competition. She also finished fifth at the 1979 IAAF World Cup.

Her personal best throw was 68.28 metres with the old javelin type, achieved in 1980.
