= Tuula Laaksalo =

Finnish javelin thrower

Tuula Kaarina Laaksalo (born April 21, 1953 in Rovaniemi, Finnish Lapland) is a retired javelin thrower from Finland, who was among the best female javelin throwers in the world in the 1980s. She twice competed for her native country at the Summer Olympics: 1984 and 1988.

== Achievements ==
Year	Competition	Venue	Position	Notes
Representing Finland
1983	World Championships	Helsinki, Finland	6th	62.44 m
1984	Olympic Games	Los Angeles, United States	4th	66.40 m
1988	Olympic Games	Seoul, South Korea	13th	60.64 m
