= Anne Sophie Hunstad =

Norwegian politician

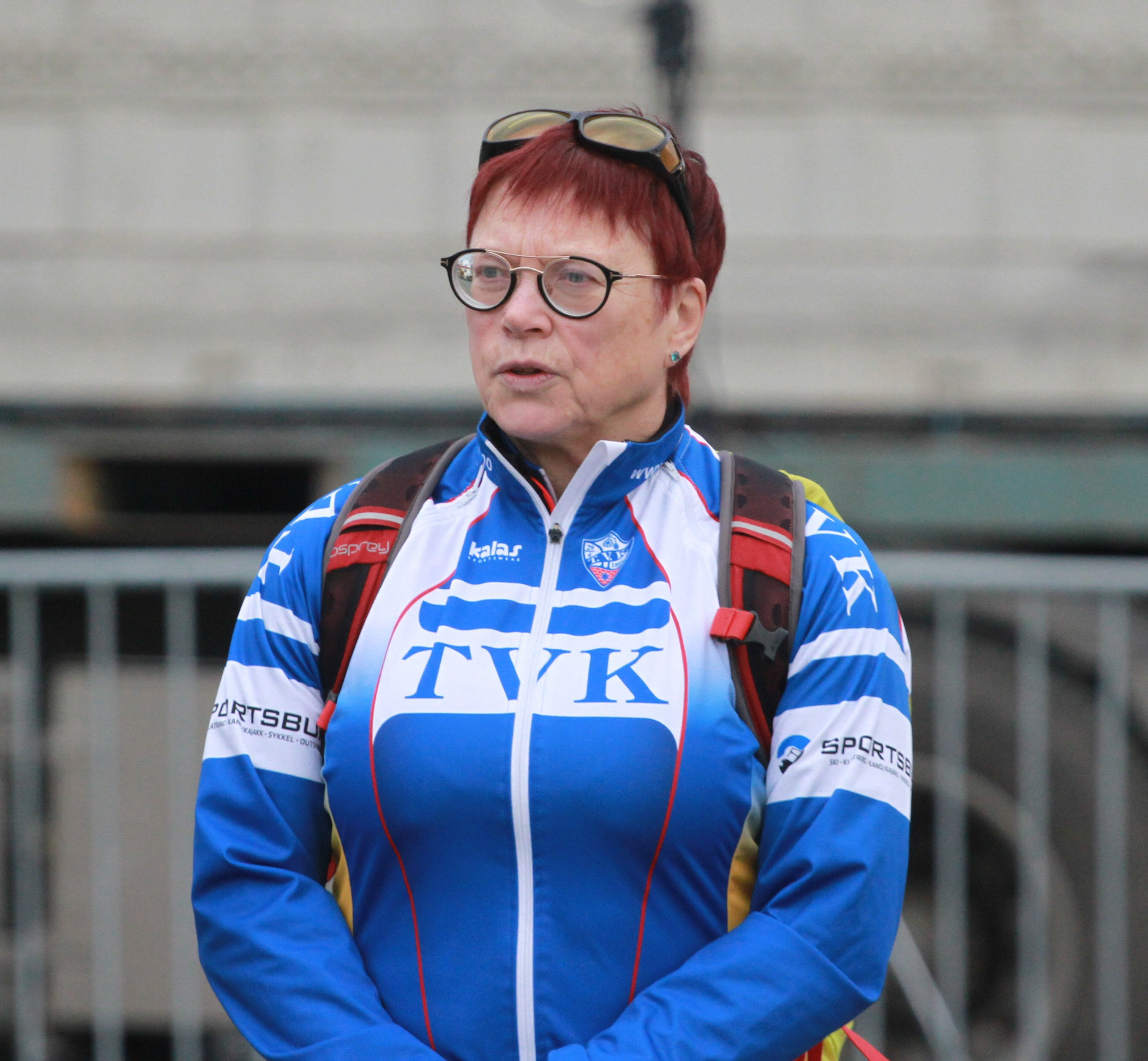
- Anne Sophie Hunstad in 2018

Personal information
- Born: 20 September 1954 (age 72) Trondheim, Norway

Sport
- Sport: Track and field

Anne Sophie Hunstad (born 20 September 1954) is a Norwegian sports official and politician for the Labour Party

She holds the cand.mag. degree, and worked in secondary schools, chiefly as a teacher, from 1982 to 2000. She was active in athletics in the 1970s and 1980s. In the early 1970s she represented the club Lillehammer IF. She won a bronze medal in javelin throw at the Norwegian Championships in 1972. Later representing the club IL i BUL, she set a personal best in the shot put in July 1977 in Moelv, with 12.54 metres. She later represented the club Heimdal IF. She achieved 32.40 metres in the discus throw in June 1978 in Stjørdal, and 47.72 in the javelin throw (old type) in July 1983 in Trondheim.

She is currently the chair of Sør-Trøndelag Athletics District Organization (since 2009, previously also 2003 to 2007). She chaired the sports clubs Nidelv IL from 1999 to 2004 and SK Trondheims-Ørn from 2006 to 2009, and was a board member of Trondhjems SK since 2006 and the Norwegian Athletics Association from 2007 to 2011. In 2011, she was suggested by the election committee for a spot on the board of the Norwegian Olympic and Paralympic Committee and Confederation of Sports. At the Confederation's national convention, however, the politicking went against the wishes of the Norwegian Athletics Association and others, and Hunstad withdrew her candidacy.

In politics, she was a member of the municipal council of Trondheim Municipality from 1991 to 2003 and Sør-Trøndelag county council from 2007 to 2011. She was a municipal commissioner from 1999 to 2003, and in 2003 she was hired as a political adviser for the city's mayor Rita Ottervik.

She has chaired Røros Museum since 2007, chaired the Norwegian State Housing Bank in Central Norway from 2006 to 2009 (board member since 1997) and was a board member of Trondheim og Omegn Boligbyggelag from 2004 to 2006.
