= Athletics at the 1975 Pan American Games – Women's javelin throw =

Women's javelin throw at the Pan American Games

The women's javelin throw event at the 1975 Pan American Games was held in Mexico City on 20 October.

== Results ==
Rank	Name	Nationality	#1	#2	#3	#4	#5	#6	Result	Notes
1st place, gold medalist(s)	Sherry Calvert	United States	51.28	54.70	–	–	–	–	54.70	
2nd place, silver medalist(s)	María Beltrán	Cuba	52.16	50.64	54.36	51.34	52.68	45.00	54.36	
3rd place, bronze medalist(s)	Lynn Cannon	United States	x	42.92	48.64	47.10	x	47.28	48.64	
4	Laurie Kern	Canada	x	42.08	42.50	x	48.40	x	48.40	
5	Mariela Zapata	Colombia							45.18	
6	Diana Rodríguez	Puerto Rico							43.84	
7	Magda Faneyte	Netherlands Antilles							41.26	
8	Guadalupe López	Mexico							40.38	
9	Guadalupe Dávila	Mexico							38.72	
10	Ivelisse Gómez	Dominican Republic							37.16	
	Jay Dahlgren	Canada	x	x	x				NM	
