= Helena Laine =

Finnish javelin thrower (born 1955)

Sirpa Helena Laine (born March 30, 1955, in Helsinki) is a retired female javelin thrower from Finland. She competed for her native country at the 1984 Summer Olympics, finishing in 11th place (58.18 metres).

== Achievements ==
Year	Competition	Venue	Position	Notes
Representing Finland
1984	Olympic Games	Los Angeles, United States	11th	58.18 m
