= Petra Felke =

German javelin thrower

Petra Meier
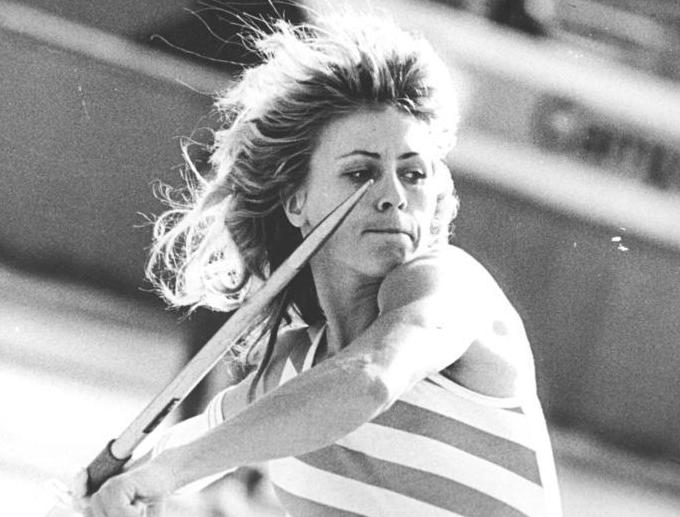
- Felke in 1984

Personal information
- Nationality: German
- Born: Petra Felke; 30 July 1959 (age 66) Saalfeld, East Germany
- Height: 1.72 m (5 ft 8 in)
- Weight: 74 kg (163 lb)

Sport
- Country: East Germany; Germany
- Sport: Track and field
- Event: Javelin throw
- Club: SC Motor Jena

Achievements and titles
- Personal bests: WR 80.00 m (1988)
Medal record
Women's athletics
Representing East Germany
Olympic Games
| Gold medal – first place | 1988 Seoul | Javelin |
World Championships
| Silver medal – second place | 1987 Rome | Javelin |
European Championships
| Silver medal – second place | 1986 Stuttgart | Javelin |
| Bronze medal – third place | 1990 Split | Javelin |
Universiade
| Gold medal – first place | 1981 Bucharest | Javelin |
Representing Germany
World Championships
| Silver medal – second place | 1991 Tokyo | Javelin |

Petra Meier (née Felke; born 30 July 1959) is a retired German track and field athlete who competed in the javelin throw. Representing East Germany, she became the Olympic Champion in 1988 and broke the world record four times between 1985 and 1988. She is the only woman to throw a javelin 80 metres or more, with her world record of 80.00 m (262 ft 5 1/2 in). This throw was the world record from 1988 until 1999, when a new javelin design was implemented. She also won the javelin title at the 1989 IAAF World Cup and silver medals at the World Championships in 1987 and 1991.

== Career ==
Born Petra Felke in Saalfeld, East Germany, she trained with Ruth Fuchs at SC Motor Jena. She won the silver medal in the javelin at the 1977 European Junior Championships, and went on to succeed Fuchs as her country's top javelin thrower. She finished third at the GDR Championships in 1978 and 1981, and second in 1982 and 1983, before winning the first of six consecutive titles in 1984. She finished ninth in the final at the 1983 World Championships in Helsinki, but was prevented from competing at the 1984 Los Angeles Olympics due to the Soviet-led boycott. 10 days after the 1984 Olympic javelin final, Felke won the Friendship Games title with a throw of 73.30 metres.

Her first world record came on 4 June 1985, when she broke the record twice on the same day, with throws of 75.26 and 75.40 metres. She ended the 1985 season throwing 66.22 metres to finish second behind Olga Gavrilova at the World Cup in Canberra. A year later at the 1986 European Championships, she threw 72.52 m to win the silver medal behind Great Britain's Fatima Whitbread. Her third world record came on 29 July 1987, when she threw 78.90 metres, but five weeks later at the World Championships in Rome, she again finished second to Whitbread, who won with 76.64 m to Felke's 71.76 m.

On 9 September 1988, Felke broke the world record for the fourth time and became the first woman to ever throw the javelin further than 80 metres. The world record throw was officially measured at 80.00 m, exactly. However, the rules in force at the time dictated that measurements had to be rounded down to the nearest 2 cm, so the actual distance could have been up to 80.0199 metres. Two weeks later, she won the gold medal at the 1988 Seoul Olympics with a throw of 74.68 metres, with Whitbread winning the silver medal and compatriot Beate Koch winning the bronze. She went on to win the 1989 World Cup title in Barcelona, as well as a bronze medal at the 1990 European Championships.

In 1991, now competing for a unified Germany and as Petra Meier, she won silver at the World Championships in Tokyo with a 68.68 m throw. She concluded her international career at the 1992 Barcelona Olympics, where she finished seventh with a disappointing 59.02 m. The javelin specifications were changed in 1999 and the records were restarted, thus Meier's record became eternal. As of 2023, Barbora Špotáková is the new world record holder with a throw of 72.28 m.

== International competitions ==
All results regarding Javelin

| Year | Competition | Venue | Position | Notes |
Representing East Germany
| 1977 | European Junior Championships | Donetsk, Soviet Union | 2nd | 57.68 m |
| 1981 | Universiade | Bucharest, Romania | 1st | 65.20 m |
| 1982 | European Championships | Athens, Greece | 7th | 65.56 m |
| 1983 | World Championships | Helsinki, Finland | 9th | 62.02 m |
| 1984 | Friendship Games | Prague, Czechoslovakia | 1st | 73.30 m |
| 1985 | World Cup | Canberra, Australia | 2nd | 66.22 m |
| 1986 | Goodwill Games | Seattle, United States | 1st | 70.78 m |
| 1986 | European Championships | Stuttgart, Germany | 2nd | 72.52 m |
| 1986 | Grand Prix Final | Rome, Italy | 1st | 70.64 m |
| 1987 | World Championships | Rome, Italy | 2nd | 71.76 m |
| 1988 | Olympic Games | Seoul, South Korea | 1st | 74.68 m |
| 1989 | World Cup | Barcelona, Spain | 1st | 70.32 m |
| 1990 | European Championships | Split, Yugoslavia | 3rd | 66.56 m |
| 1990 | Grand Prix Final | Athens, Greece | 1st | 66.44 m |
Representing Germany
| 1991 | World Championships | Tokyo, Japan | 2nd | 68.68 m |
| 1992 | Olympic Games | Barcelona, Spain | 7th | 59.02 m |

Sporting positions
| Preceded by Tiina Lillak | Women's Javelin Best Year Performance; 1984–1985 | Succeeded by Fatima Whitbread |
| Preceded by Fatima Whitbread | Women's Javelin Best Year Performance; 1987–1990 | Succeeded by Trine Hattestad |
