= María Caridad Colón =

Cuban javelin thrower

María Colon
Personal information
- Full name: María Caridad Colón Rueñes-Salazar
- Born: March 25, 1958 (age 68) Baracoa, Cuba
Medal record
Women's athletics
Representing Cuba
Olympic Games
Gold medal – first place	1980 Moscow	Javelin throw
Pan American Games
Gold medal – first place	1979 San Juan	Javelin throw
Gold medal – first place	1983 Caracas	Javelin throw
Silver medal – second place	1987 Indianapolis	Javelin throw
CAC Junior Championships (U20)
Gold medal – first place	1976 Xalapa	Javelin throw
Bronze medal – third place	1976 Xalapa	Shot put
Summer Universiade
Bronze medal – third place	1985 Kobe	Javelin throw

María Caridad Colón Rueñes-Salazar (born March 25, 1958) is a former javelin thrower from Cuba who won the gold medal at the 1980 Summer Olympics, setting a new record.

She lit the flame at the 1982 Central American and Caribbean Games.

In 2020, Rueñes became a member of the International Olympic Committee (IOC).

== International competitions ==
Year	Competition	Venue	Position	Event	Notes
Representing Cuba
1976	Central American and Caribbean; Junior Championships (U-20)	Xalapa, Mexico	3rd	Shot put	10.60 m
1976	Central American and Caribbean; Junior Championships (U-20)	Xalapa, Mexico	1st	Javelin	46.13 m
1978	Central American and Caribbean Games	Medellín, Colombia	1st	Javelin	63.40 m
1979	Pan American Games	San Juan, Puerto Rico	1st	Javelin	62.36 m
1979	Soviet Spartakiad	Moscow, Soviet Union	2nd	Javelin	62.30 m
1979	World Cup	Montreal, Canada	3rd	Javelin	63.50 m^{1}
1980	Olympic Games	Moscow, Soviet Union	1st	Javelin	68.40 m
1982	Central American and Caribbean Games	Havana, Cuba	1st	Javelin	62.80 m
1983	World Championships	Helsinki, Finland	8th	Javelin	62.04 m
1983	Pan American Games	Caracas, Venezuela	1st	Javelin	63.76 m
1983	Ibero-American Championships	Barcelona, Spain	1st	Javelin	57.60 m
1984	Friendship Games	Prague, Czechoslovakia	3rd	Javelin	64.34 m
1985	Central American and Caribbean Championships	Nassau, Bahamas	2nd	Javelin	62.78 m
1985	Universiade	Kobe, Japan	3rd	Javelin	62.46 m
1985	World Cup	Canberra, Australia	7th	Javelin	54.00 m^{1}
1986	Central American and Caribbean Games	Santiago, Dominican Republic	1st	Javelin	67.00 m
1986	Ibero-American Championships	Havana, Cuba	1st	Javelin	61.80 m
1987	Pan American Games	Indianapolis, United States	2nd	Javelin	61.66 m
1987	World Championships	Rome, Italy	18th (q)	Javelin	57.82 m
1990	Central American and Caribbean Games	Mexico City, Mexico	2nd	Javelin	55.86 m

^{1}Representing the Americas
