= Regula Egger =

Swiss javelin thrower

Personal information
- Born: 10 January 1958 (age 67) Adliswil, Zürich, Switzerland

Sport
- Sport: Javelin throw

Regula Egger (born 10 January 1958) is a former Swiss female javelin thrower. She competed at the 1984 Summer Olympics
