= Sabine Sebrowski =

German javelin thrower

Personal information
- Nationality: German
- Born: 28 April 1951 (age 75) Crivitz, East Germany

Sport
- Sport: Athletics
- Event: Javelin throw

Sabine Sebrowski (née Kärgel; born 28 April 1951) is a German athlete. She competed in the women's javelin throw at the 1976 Summer Olympics, where she finished in fifth place.
