= Antoaneta Todorova =

Bulgarian javelin thrower (born 1963)

Antoaneta Ivanova Todorova-Selenska (Bulgarian: Антоанета Иванова Тодорова-Селенска; born 8 June 1963) is a retired female javelin thrower from Bulgaria, who set the world record and the world's best year performance in 1981. She made her mark (71.88 m) at a meet in Zagreb on 15 August 1981.

Todorova was born in Samovodene, Veliko Tarnovo, and competed in three Summer Olympics (1980, 1988 and 1992). She was named the BTA Best Balkan Athlete of the Year in 1981.

== International competitions ==
Year	Competition	Venue	Position	Notes
Representing Bulgaria
1980	Olympic Games	Moscow, Soviet Union	10th	60.66 m
1988	Olympic Games	Seoul, South Korea	11th	56.78 m
1990	European Championships	Split, Yugoslavia	7th	61.24 m
1992	Olympic Games	Barcelona, Spain	16th	59.40 m
1993	World Championships	Stuttgart, Germany	10th	58.82 m
1994	European Championships	Helsinki, Finland	8th	57.76 m

Sporting positions
Preceded by Tatyana Biryulina	Women's Javelin Best Year Performance; 1981	Succeeded by Sofia Sakorafa
