= Svetlana Babich =

Soviet-Russian javelin thrower

Personal information
- Nationality: Russian
- Born: July 17, 1947 (age 78) Pavlovsk, Altai Krai, Russian SFSR, Soviet Union
- Height: 169 cm (5 ft 7 in)
- Weight: 69 kg (152 lb)

Sport
- Country: Soviet Union
- Sport: Javelin throw
- Club: Dynamo Moskva oblast

Achievements and titles
- Olympic finals: 1972 Summer Olympics: Women's Javelin throw – 8th 1976 Summer Olympics: Women's Javelin throw – 6th
- Personal best: 63.74 m (209 ft 1 in) (1976)
Medal record
Representing Soviet Union
Women's Javelin throw
Universiade
Gold medal – first place	1973 Moscow	Women's Javelin throw

Svetlana Vladimirovna Babich (Russian: Светлана Владимировна Бабич, née Королёва, Korolyova; born July 17, 1947) is a retired female javelin thrower who represented the Soviet Union twice at the Summer Olympics: 1972 and 1976. She is best known for winning the gold medal in the women's javelin throw event at the 1973 Summer Universiade.
