= Yordanka Peeva =

Bulgarian javelin thrower

Personal information
- Nationality: Bulgarian
- Born: 23 April 1953 (age 73) Buhovo, Bulgaria

Sport
- Sport: Athletics
- Event: Javelin throw

Yordanka Peeva (Bulgarian: Йорданка Пеева, born 23 April 1953) is a Bulgarian athlete. She competed in the women's javelin throw at the 1976 Summer Olympics.
