= Jadvyga Putinienė =

Lithuanian javelin thrower

Personal information
- Born: Jadvyga Dunauskaitė; 03 October 1944 (age 81) Luoke, Lithuania
- Height: 1.71 m (5 ft 7 in)
- Weight: 68 kg (150 lb)

Sport
- Sport: Javelin throw

Jadvyga Putinienė (née Dunauskaitė on 30 December 1945 or 2 October 1944) is a Lithuanian javelin thrower. She competed at the 1980 Summer Olympics and finished in 11th place with a throw of 59.94 m. She was Lithuanian champion (1970–72, 1974, 1975, 1977, 1978, 1980), vice-champion (1976, 1981), and record holder (1978–1980). Putinienė continues competing internationally in the pentathlon and javelin throw, in the masters category.

Putinienė graduated from the Lithuanian Sports University (1967) and worked as an athletics coach at Dynamo (1965–76) and Žalgiris (1976–1985).
