= Ute Richter =

German javelin thrower

Personal information
- Nationality: German
- Born: 14 July 1958 (age 68) Pirna, Bezirk Dresden, East Germany

Sport
- Sport: Athletics
- Event: Javelin throw

Ute Richter (born 14 July 1958) is a German athlete. She competed in the women's javelin throw at the 1980 Summer Olympics.
