= Kate Schmidt =

American javelin thrower (born 1953)

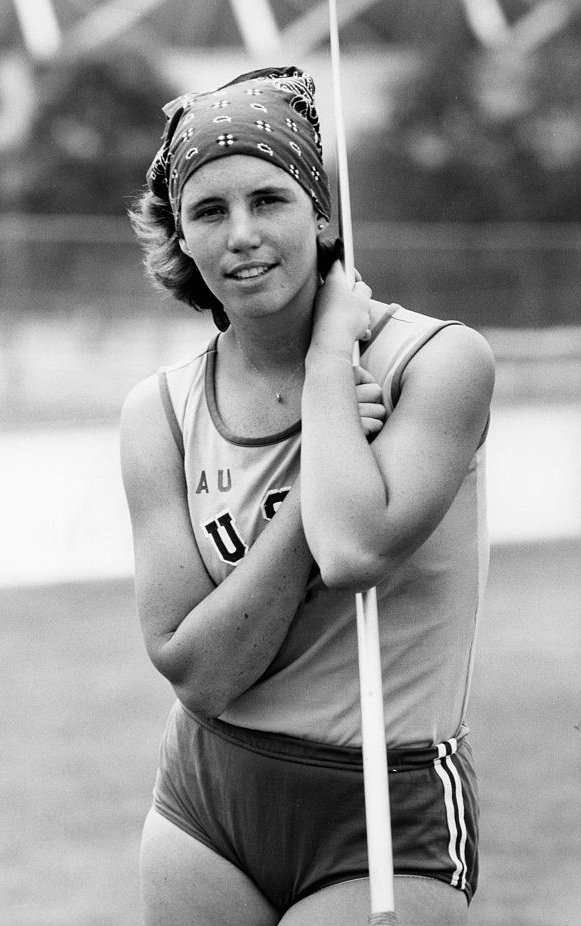
- Schmidt in 1976

Personal information
- Born: December 29, 1953 (age 72) Long Beach, California, U.S.
- Height: 6 ft 1 in (1.86 m)
- Weight: 180 lb (80 kg)

Sport
- Sport: Athletics
- Event: Javelin throw

Achievements and titles
- Personal best: 69.32 m (1977)
Medal record
Women's athletics
Representing the United States
Olympic Games
Bronze medal – third place	1972 Munich	Javelin
Bronze medal – third place	1976 Montreal	Javelin
Universiade
Silver medal – second place	1975 Rome	Javelin

Kathryn Joan "Kate" Schmidt (born December 29, 1953) is an American former world record holder in the javelin throw. A native of California, graduate of Woodrow Wilson Classical High School, and alumnus of UCLA, she won bronze medals at the 1972 and 1976 Olympics. She qualified for the 1980 Olympics, but did not compete due to the 1980 Summer Olympics boycott. She placed fourth at the 1984 Olympic Trials.

From 1972 to 1977, Schmidt won seven national titles. She set a new world record of 69.32 m (227 ft 5 in) in Fürth, Germany. Her throw was almost 30 feet longer than the previous American record of 198 feet 8 inches (60.55 m) set by Barbara Friedrich in 1967. Schmidt holds twelve of the top 20 spots of the farthest throws ever by an American. She held the American record until the women's javelin was redesigned in 1999, resetting the records.

Schmidt is a member of the USATF National Track and Field Hall of Fame (1994), the National Throws Coaches Hall of Fame, the CSULB Hall of Fame, the LBCC HAll of Fame, and the Woodrow Wilson High School Hall of Fame (Long Beach, CA).

Schmidt owns HomeBodies, a mobile fitness and rehab business, and was the men's and women's throwing coach for Occidental College in Northern Los Angeles for a while. Schmidt is also an abstract artist with works on display with the Art of the Olympians (AOTO) organization.

1996, Kate Schmidt (age 42) won the javelin at the Masters National Outdoor Track and Field Championship, Spokane, WA.
