= Karin Smith =

American javelin thrower (born 1955)

Personal information
- Full name: Karin Kiefer Smith
- Nationality: American
- Born: August 4, 1955 (age 70) Fürstenfeldbruck, Bavaria, Germany
- Height: 5 ft 6 in (1.67 m)

Sport
- Sport: Athletics
- Event: Javelin throw
Medal record
Representing United States
Summer Universiade
Silver medal – second place	1981 Bucharest	Javelin throw

Karin Kiefer Smith (born August 4, 1955) is a retired female javelin thrower from the United States. She was born in Germany. She is a three-time Olympian. Smith qualified for a fourth, the 1980 U.S. Olympic team, but was unable to compete due to the 1980 Summer Olympics boycott. She did, however, receive one of 461 Congressional Gold Medals created especially for the spurned athletes.

Her all-time career-best mark was 212 feet, 6 inches in August 1980.

== Early life and college success ==
After graduating from La Jolla High School, Smith initially attended UCLA before leaving to train in Germany in 1977.

Smith then returned to college, enrolling at Cal Poly in San Luis Obispo. While at Cal Poly, she won the Broderick Award (now the Honda Sports Award) as the nation's best female collegiate track and field competitor in 1982.

With Smith leading the way, the Mustangs won the 1981 AIAW Division II national championship and then repeated at the first NCAA D-II national finals meet in 1982. During an era when Division II winners could then also compete at the Division I meets, Smith won the NCAA Division I javelin individual national championship on June 4, 1982 with a mark of 206 feet, 9 inches, which held the all-time event record with the previous design.

== International competitions ==
Representing the United States
Year	Competition	Venue	Position	Notes
1976	Olympic Games	Montréal, Canada	8th	57.50 m
1983	World Championships	Helsinki, Finland	10th	59.76 m
1984	Olympic Games	Los Angeles, United States	8th	62.06 m
1988	Olympic Games	Seoul, South Korea	20th	57.94 m
1990	Goodwill Games	Seattle, United States	3rd	58.94 m
1991	World Championships	Tokyo, Japan	13th	60.34 m
