= Tiina Lillak =

Finnish javelin thrower (born 1961)

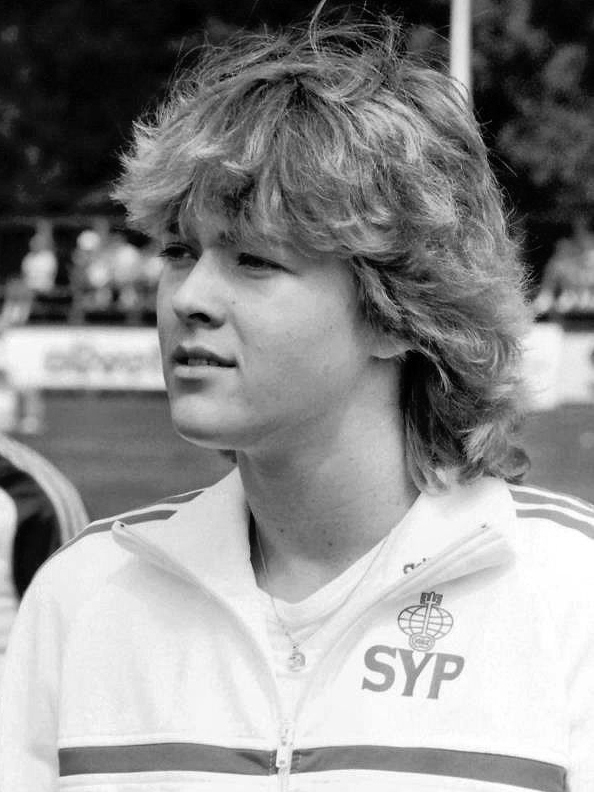
- Lillak in 1983

Personal information
- Full name: Ilse Kristiina Lillak
- Born: 15 April 1961 (age 65) Helsinki, Finland
- Height: 1.81 m (5 ft 11 in)
- Weight: 74 kg (163 lb)
Medal record
Women's Athletics
Representing Finland
Olympic Games
Silver medal – second place	1984 Los Angeles	Javelin
World Championships
Gold medal – first place	1983 Helsinki	Javelin

Ilse Kristiina "Tiina" Lillak (born 15 April 1961) is a Finnish former javelin thrower. She is the 1983 world champion and 1984 Olympic silver medalist. She also twice broke the world record, with throws of 72.40 metres in 1982 and 74.76 metres in 1983. The latter distance ranks third on the all-time list with the old javelin model.

== Early life ==
Lillak was born to a Sweden-Finnish mother and an Estonian-born father, Ivar Lillak. They spoke Finnish and Swedish in their family. Her father had moved to Finland from Estonia with his family in 1937 when he was three years old.

== Career ==
Lillak finished fourth in the 1982 European Athletics Championships, which were held in Athens. On July 29, 1982, she threw a new world record in Helsinki of 72.40 meters. The record lasted until September when Greek thrower Sofia Sakorafa reached 74.20 meters. The following year, Lillak again broke the world record, throwing 74.76 meters in Tampere on June 13. This distance remained a world record until June 1985, and also stood as a national record for Finland until 1999, when the javelin type was altered and the former records were wiped clean. Among female javelin throwers, only Petra Felke and Fatima Whitbread have ever thrown further. (The record with the current model is 72.28m).

At the 1983 World Championships in Athletics held in Helsinki, Lillak became the champion in front of her home crowd when she threw for 70.82 meters on her last attempt leaving Britain's second placed Fatima Whitbread in tears at track side as she went running off down the track celebrating with the ecstatic crowd. The whole season was a success for Lillak, who threw over 70 meters in 16 separate competitions and didn't lose a single time.

Although Lillak had only taken part in three competitions earlier in the year, she still managed to earn an Olympic silver medal at the 1984 Summer Olympics in Los Angeles, California. Medals did not materialise at the 1986 European Athletics Championships (fourth) or the 1987 World Championships in Athletics (sixth).

She failed in an attempt to reach the Olympic podium a second time at the 1988 Seoul Olympics, where Lillak did not pass the qualifying round. She participated in five competitions in 1989, but no major events. In 1990 she won the last of her seven Finnish national championships and came tenth in the 1990 European Athletics Championships. In the 1991 World Championships in Athletics, Lillak did not pass the qualifying round (in fact, she did not throw over 62 meters the entire season).

Since retiring from athletics in 1992, Lillak has been working as masseuse.

== International competitions ==
Year	Competition	Venue	Position	Notes
RepresentingFinland
1980	Olympic Games	Moscow, Soviet Union	14th (q)	56.26 m
1982	European Championships	Athens, Greece	4th	66.26 m
1983	World Championships	Helsinki, Finland	1st	70.82 m
1984	Olympic Games	Los Angeles, United States	2nd	69.00 m
1986	European Championships	Stuttgart, Germany	4th	66.66 m
1987	World Championships	Rome, Italy	6th	66.82 m
1988	Olympic Games	Seoul, South Korea	15th (q)	60.06 m
1990	European Championships	Split, Yugoslavia	10th	58.80 m
1991	World Championships	Tokyo, Japan	15th (q)	58.42 m
(q) Indicates overall position in qualifying round

Sporting positions
Preceded by Sofia Sakorafa	Women's Javelin Best Year Performance; 1983	Succeeded by Petra Felke
