= Nadezhda Yakubovich =

Soviet javelin thrower

Personal information
- Born: 24 February 1954 (age 72) Narutovichi, Brest, Soviet Union

Sport
- Sport: Track and field
Medal record
Representing Soviet Union
Summer Universiade
| Gold medal – first place | 1975 Rome | Javelin throw |
| Gold medal – first place | 1977 Sofia | Javelin throw |

Nadezhda Vasilyevna Yakubovich (Belarusian: Надзея Васільеўна Якубовіч, Russian: Надежда Васильевна Якубович; born 24 February 1954) is a retired female javelin thrower who represented the Soviet Union during her career. She is best known for twice winning the gold medal in the women's javelin throw event at the Summer Universiade.

== Achievements ==
| Year | Competition | Venue | Position | Notes |
Representing Soviet Union
| 1975 | Universiade | Rome, Italy | 1st | 61.72 m |
| 1976 | Olympic Games | Montreal, Canada | 7th | 59.16 m |
| 1977 | Universiade | Sofia, Bulgaria | 1st | 61.42 m |
