= Anna Verouli =

Greek javelin thrower

Personal information
- Born: November 13, 1956 (age 69) Kavala, Greece
Medal record
Women's athletics
Representing Greece
World Championships
Bronze medal – third place	1983 Helsinki	Javelin throw
European Championships
Gold medal – first place	1982 Athens	Javelin throw
Mediterranean Games
Gold medal – first place	1983 Casablanca	Javelin throw
Gold medal – first place	1991 Athens	Javelin throw
Silver medal – second place	1987 Latakia	Javelin throw

Anna Verouli (Greek: Άννα Βερούλη, born November 13, 1956) is a retired Greek javelin thrower. She was born in Kavala.

== Career ==
Anna Verouli won the gold medal at the 1982 European Athletics Championships, and a bronze medal at the 1983 World Championships in Athletics. She won two gold medals in the Mediterranean Games in 1983 and 1991, in 1987, she won a silver medal.

She was named the Greek Female Athlete of the Year for 1982 and 1983.

Verouli tested positive for nandrolone at the 1984 Summer Olympics and was banned from the competition.

== Personal life ==
She was married to weightlifter Ioannis Tsintsaris.

== Honours ==
Year	Competition	Venue	Position	Notes
Representing Greece
1982	European Championships	Athens, Greece	1st	70.02 m
1983	Mediterranean Games	Casablanca, Morocco	1st	61.62 m
1983	World Championships	Helsinki, Finland	3rd	65.72 m
1984	Olympic Games	Los Angeles, United States	—	DSQ
1986	European Championships	Stuttgart, West Germany	10th	57.06 m
1987	Mediterranean Games	Latakia, Syria	2nd	58.92 m
1987	World Championships	Rome, Italy	13th (q)	60.60 m
1988	Balkan Games	Ankara, Turkey	1st	68,76 m
1988	Olympic Games	Seoul, South Korea	19th (q)	58.52 m
1989	Balkan Games	Serres, Greece	1st	65,58 m
1990	Balkan Games	Istanbul, Turkey	1st	64,92 m
1990	European Championships	Split, Yugoslavia	8th	59.32 m
1991	Mediterranean Games	Athens, Greece	1st	60.34 m
1991	World Championships	Tokyo, Japan	10th	59.12 m
1992	Olympic Games	Barcelona, Spain	21st (q)	56.96 m

== See also ==
- List of doping cases in athletics
