= Jennifer Pace (athlete) =

Maltese athlete

Personal information
- Nationality: Maltese
- Born: 21 March 1958 (age 68)

Sport
- Sport: Athletics
- Event: Javelin throw

Jennifer Pace (born 21 March 1958) is a Maltese athlete. She competed in the women's javelin throw at the 1984 Summer Olympics.
