= Antje Zöllkau =

East German javelin thrower

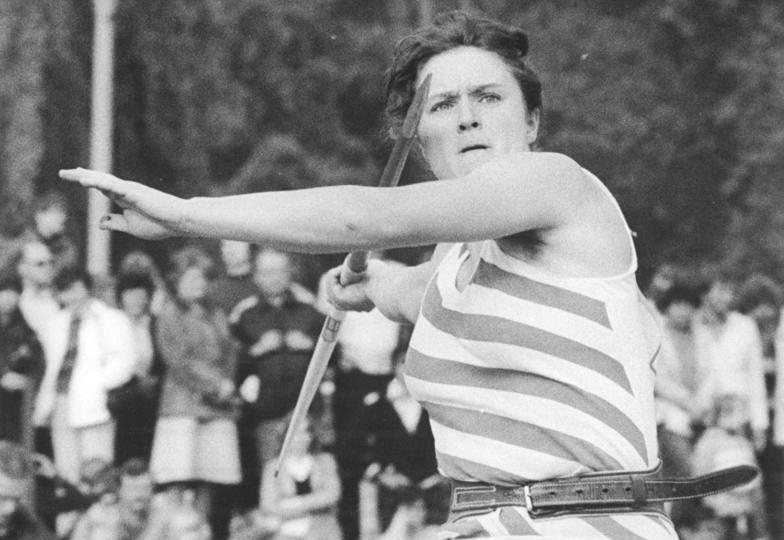
- Antje Kempe in 1984

Personal information
- Nationality: East Germany
- Born: Antje Kempe; 22 June 1963 (age 63) Saalfeld, Thuringia, East Germany
- Height: 1.72 m (5 ft 8 in)
- Weight: 71 kg (157 lb)

Sport
- Country: East Germany
- Sport: Athletics
- Event: Javelin throw
- Club: SC Motor Jena

Achievements and titles
- Personal best: 72.16 m (1984)
Medal record
Women's athletics
Representing East Germany
European Championships
Silver medal – second place	1982 Athens	Javelin throw

Antje Zöllkau (née Kempe, born 22 June 1963) is a German former javelin thrower who represented East Germany. The 1982 European silver medallist, her best javelin throw of 72.16 metres in 1984, ranks her in the world all-time top 10 for the Pre-1999 old model javelin.

== Career ==
Born Antje Kempe in Saalfeld, Thuringia, she won the silver medals at the 1981 European Junior Championships and the 1982 European Championships. She then competed at the 1983 World Championships, finishing eleventh. She won the GDR Championship title in 1983 with a throw of 68.42 metres.

Her personal best throw was 72.16 metres with the old javelin type, achieved in May 1984 in Celje. This ranks her second among German javelin throwers, only behind Petra Felke (who held the world record with the old javelin type).

== International competitions ==
All results regarding javelin throw

Year	Competition	Venue	Position	Notes
Representing East Germany
1981	European Junior Championships	Utrecht, Netherlands	2nd	60.60 m
1982	European Championships	Athens, Greece	2nd	67.94 m
1983	World Championships	Helsinki, Finland	11th	58.82 m
