= Fausta Quintavalla =

Italian javelin thrower (born 1959)

Personal information
- Nationality: Italian
- Born: 4 May 1959 (age 67) Montechiarugolo, Italy
- Height: 1.75 m (5 ft 9 in)
- Weight: 74 kg (163 lb)

Sport
- Country: Italy
- Sport: Athletics
- Event: Javelin throw
- Club: Iveco Torino

Achievements and titles
- Personal best: Javelin throw: 67.20 m (1983)
Medal record
Universiade
Silver medal – second place	1983 Edmonton	Javelin throw
Mediterranean Games
Silver medal – second place	1979 Split	Javelin throw
Silver medal – second place	1983 Casablanca	Javelin throw

Fausta Quintavalla (born 4 May 1959 in Montechiarugolo, Parma) is a former javelin thrower from Italy. She won three medals, at senior level, at the International athletics competitions.

== Biography ==
Quintavalla set her personal best in 1983, throwing 67.20 metres. She competed for her native country twice at the Summer Olympics (1980 and 1984). Her best Olympic finish was the twelfth place in Moscow, USSR (1980). She has 41 caps in national team from 1976 to 1991.

== Achievements ==
Year	Competition	Venue	Position	Notes
1983	World Championships	Helsinki, Finland	15th	59.34 m
1983	World Student Games	Edmonton, Canada	2nd	63.06 m
1984	Olympic Games	Los Angeles, United States	15th	57.66 m

== National titles ==
Fausta Quintavalla has won 8 times consecutively the individual national championship.

- 8 wins in javelin throw (1979, 1980, 1981, 1982, 1983, 1984, 1986, 1990)

== See also ==
- Italian all-time lists - Javelin throw
