= Ivanka Vancheva =

Bulgarian javelin thrower (1953–2020)

Personal information
- Born: 31 October 1953 Plovdiv, Bulgaria
- Died: 5 August 2020 (aged 66) Plovdiv, Bulgaria

Sport
- Sport: Track and field
Medal record
Representing Bulgaria
Summer Universiade
Silver medal – second place	1977 Sofia	Javelin throw
Silver medal – second place	1979 Mexico City	Javelin throw

Ivanka Vancheva (Bulgarian: Иванка Ванчева; 31 October 1953 – 5 August 2020) was a javelin thrower from Bulgaria, who set her personal best in 1980, throwing 65.38 metres. She competed for her native country at the 1980 Summer Olympics in Moscow, USSR, finishing in fifth place in the overall-rankings.
