= Ruth Fuchs =

East German javelin thrower and politician (1946–2023)

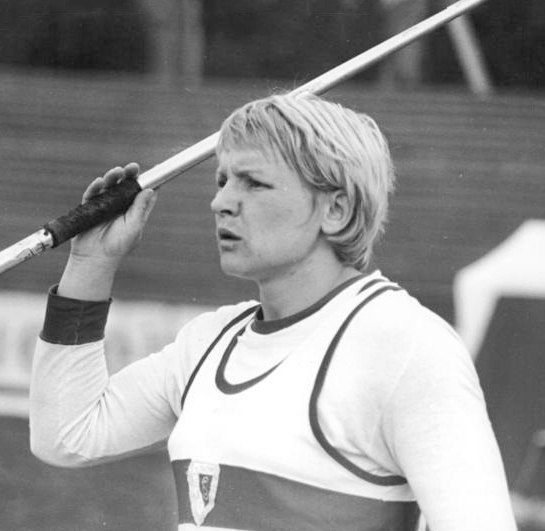
- Fuchs in 1980

Personal information
- Nationality: Germany
- Born: Ruth Gamm; 14 December 1946 Egeln, Saxony-Anhalt; Germany
- Died: 20 September 2023 (aged 76) Jena, Thuringia; Germany
- Height: 1.69 m (5 ft 7 in)
- Weight: 71 kg (157 lb)

Sport
- Country: East Germany
- Sport: Athletics
- Event: Javelin throw
- Club: TuS Jena

Achievements and titles
- Personal best: 69.96 m (1980)
Medal record
Women's athletics
Representing East Germany
Olympic Games
Gold medal – first place	1972 Munich	Javelin throw
Gold medal – first place	1976 Montreal	Javelin throw
European Championships
Gold medal – first place	1974 Rome	Javelin
Gold medal – first place	1978 Prague	Javelin
Bronze medal – third place	1971 Helsinki	Javelin

Ruth Fuchs (née Gamm, later Hellmann; 14 December 1946 – 20 September 2023) was a German politician and athlete. Fuchs, representing East Germany, was the winner of the women's javelin at the 1972 (Munich) and 1976 (Montreal) Olympic Games. She set the world record for the javelin six times during the 1970s.

Her personal best throw was 69.96 metres with the old javelin type, achieved in April 1980 in Split. This ranks her seventh among German old-type-javelin throwers, behind Petra Felke (who held the world record), Antje Kempe, Silke Renk, Beate Koch, Karen Forkel, and Tanja Damaske.

Fuchs admitted using steroids during her career, as part of the official East German sports programme.

After retirement from track and field, Fuchs became a member of Parliament for the Party of Democratic Socialism (now the Left Party) in the re-united Germany. After her retirement from public life Fuchs lived in Bucha, Saale-Holzland, in Thuringia, Germany.

Ruth Fuchs died at the University Hospital in Jena on 20 September 2023, at the age of 76.
