= Éva Ráduly-Zörgő =

Romanian javelin thrower

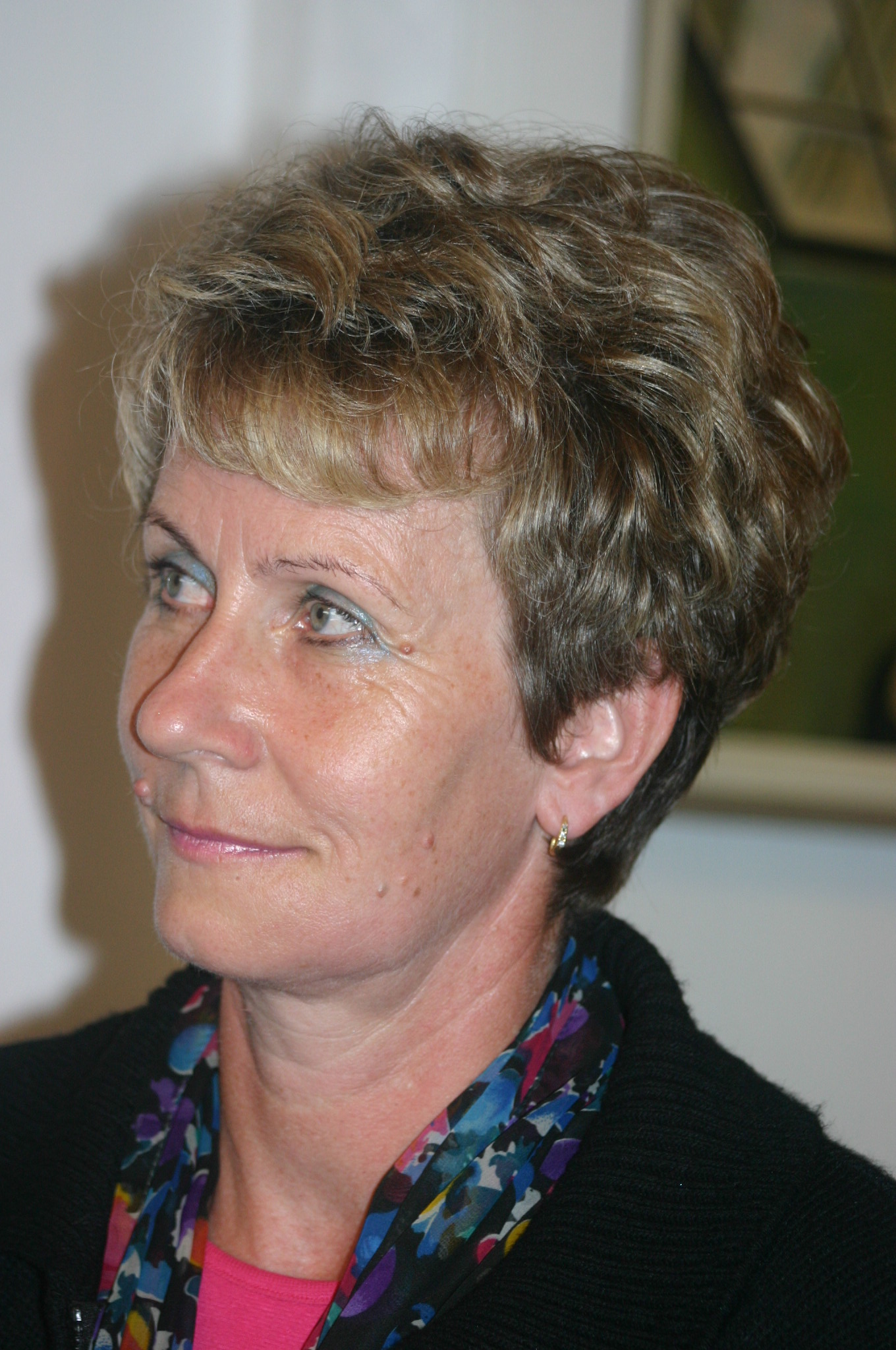

Personal information
- Born: October 23, 1954 (age 71) Cluj-Napoca, Romania
Medal record
Women's athletics
Representing Romania
Universiade
Gold medal – first place	1979 Mexico City	Javelin throw
Bronze medal – third place	1975 Rome	Javelin throw

Éva Ráduly-Zörgő (Éva Ileana Ráduly-Zörgő; born October 23, 1954) is a former javelin thrower from Romania, who set her personal best in 1980, throwing 68.80 metres. She competed in three consecutive Summer Olympics (1972, 1976 and 1980) for her native country.
