= 1987 World Championships in Athletics – Women's javelin throw =

These are the official results of the Women's Javelin Throw event at the 1987 World Championships in Rome, Italy. There were a total of 31 participating athletes, with the final held on Sunday 6 September 1987. All results were made with a rough surfaced javelin (old design).

The winning margin was 4.88 metres which as of 2026 remains the only time the women's javelin throw has been won by more than four metres at these championships, although in the 2004 and 2008 Olympics the winning margins in the women's javelin throw were 5.71 metres and 5.29 metres respectively.

== Medalists ==
Gold	(United Kingdom) Fatima Whitbread; Great Britain (GBR)
Silver	Petra Felke; East Germany (GDR)
Bronze	Beate Peters; West Germany (FRG)

== Schedule ==
- All times are Central European Time (UTC+1)

Qualification Round
Group A	Group B
05.09.1987 – ??:??h	05.09.1987 – ??:??h
Final Round
06.09.1987 – 17:30h

== Abbreviations ==
- All results shown are in metres

Q	automatic qualification
q	qualification by rank
DNS	did not start
NM	no mark
WR	world record
AR	area record
NR	national record
PB	personal best
SB	season best

== Records ==
Standing records prior to the 1987 World Athletics Championships
World Record	Petra Felke (GDR)	78.90 m	July 29, 1987	Leipzig, East Germany
Event Record	Tiina Lillak (FIN)	70.82 m	August 13, 1983	Helsinki, Finland
Season Best	Petra Felke (GDR)	78.90 m	July 29, 1987	Leipzig, East Germany

== Qualification ==
- Held on Saturday 1987-09-05

RANK	GROUP A	DISTANCE
1.	Petra Felke (GDR)	69.16 m
2.	Tessa Sanderson (GBR)	66.46 m
3.	Beate Peters (FRG)	64.26 m
4.	Irina Kostyuchenkova (URS)	63.04 m
5.	Katalin Hartai (HUN)	62.68 m
6.	Natalya Kolenchukova (URS)	60.78 m
7.	Anna Verouli (GRE)	60.60 m
8.	Zhou Yuanxiang (CHN)	59.46 m
9.	Elisabet Nagy (SWE)	58.72 m
10.	María Caridad Colón (CUB)	57.82 m
11.	Emi Matsui (JPN)	57.78 m
12.	Denise Thiémard (SUI)	56.34 m
13.	Sueli dos Santos (BRA)	55.48 m
14.	Marieta Riera (VEN)	53.38 m
15.	Lee Hui-cheng (TPE)	51.42 m
16.	Mereoni Vibose (FIJ)	48.60 m

RANK	GROUP B	DISTANCE
1.	Fatima Whitbread (GBR)	67.00 m
2.	Ingrid Thyssen (FRG)	64.52 m
3.	Ivonne Leal (CUB)	62.60 m
4.	Tiina Lillak (FIN)	62.34 m
5.	Susanne Jung (GDR)	62.26 m
6.	Manuela Alizadeh (FRG)	62.16 m
7.	Natalya Shikolenko (URS)	60.40 m
8.	Céline Chartrand (CAN)	59.06 m
9.	Tuula Laaksalo (FIN)	57.24 m
10.	Li Baolian (CHN)	55.96 m
11.	Trine Solberg (NOR)	55.30 m
12.	Cathie Wilson (USA)	54.80 m
13.	Íris Grönfeldt (ISL)	54.00 m
14.	Iammo Launa (PNG)	42.70 m
—	Laverne Eve (BAH)	NM

== Final ==
Rank	Athlete	Attempts						Distance	Note
Rank	Athlete	1	2	3	4	5	6	Distance	Note
1st place, gold medalist(s)	Fatima Whitbread (GBR)							76.64 m	CR
2nd place, silver medalist(s)	Petra Felke (GDR)							71.76 m	
3rd place, bronze medalist(s)	Beate Peters (FRG)							68.82 m	
4	Tessa Sanderson (GBR)							67.54 m	
5	Susanne Jung (GDR)							67.46 m	
6	Tiina Lillak (FIN)							66.82 m	
7	Natalya Kolenchukova (URS)							65.52 m	
8	Ivonne Leal (CUB)							64.90 m	
9	Ingrid Thyssen (FRG)							64.12 m	
10	Manuela Alizadeh (FRG)							63.40 m	
11	Katalin Hartai (HUN)							60.88 m	
12	Irina Kostyuchenkova (URS)							60.60 m	

== See also ==
- 1982 Women's European Championships Javelin Throw (Athens)
- 1984 Women's Olympic Javelin Throw (Los Angeles)
- 1986 Women's European Championships Javelin Throw (Stuttgart)
- 1988 Women's Olympic Javelin Throw (Seoul)
- 1990 Women's European Championships Javelin Throw (Split)
- 1992 Women's Olympic Javelin Throw (Barcelona)
