= Athletics at the 1985 Summer Universiade – Women's javelin throw =

The women's javelin throw event at the 1985 Summer Universiade was held at the Kobe Universiade Memorial Stadium in Kobe on 30 August 1985.

== Results ==
Rank	Athlete	Nationality	Result	Notes
1st place, gold medalist(s)	Ivonne Leal	Cuba	71.82	UR
2nd place, silver medalist(s)	Beate Peters	West Germany	63.70	
3rd place, bronze medalist(s)	María Caridad Colón	Cuba	62.46	
4	Elena Révayová	Czechoslovakia	61.60	
5	Céline Chartrand	Canada	59.46	
6	Li Baolian	China	58.12	
7	Manuela Alizadeh	West Germany	57.66	
8	Teresė Nekrošaitė	Soviet Union	57.12	
9	Katalin Hartai	Hungary	55.52	
10	Emi Matsui	Japan	53.56	
11	Lori Mercer	United States	53.12	
12	Erica Wheeler	United States	51.78	
13	Ténin Camara	Ivory Coast	46.26	
14	Carmen González	Puerto Rico	45.78	
15	Jiang L.	China	45.02	
16	Kumi Yamamoto	Japan	43.82	
17	Ana María Valle	Nicaragua	39.72	
