= Nebraska Cornhuskers track and field =

University of Nebraska–Lincoln track and field teams

- Founded: 1889; 137 years ago
- University: University of Nebraska–Lincoln
- Athletic director: Troy Dannen
- Head coach: Justin St. Clair (4th season)
- Conference: Big Ten
- Location: Lincoln, Nebraska
- Indoor track: Bob Devaney Sports Center
- Outdoor track: Unnamed facility under construction
- Nickname: Cornhuskers
- Colors: Scarlet and cream

NCAA Indoor National Championships
- Women: 1982, (Note: The AIAW ran the premier women's collegiate track and field championship until 1983.) 1983, 1984

Conference Indoor Championships
- Men: 1925, 1926, 1930, 1931, 1932, 1933, 1936, 1937, 1938, 1940, 1941, 1942, 1949, 1951, 1963, 1972, 1973, 1978, 1985, 1987, 1988, 1989, 1992, 1994, 1995, 1996, 1997, 1998, 2000, 2001, 2002, 2003, 2004, 2005, 2007, 2015, 2016, 2019 Women: 1980, 1981, 1982, 1983, 1984, 1985, 1986, 1987, 1988, 1989, 1990, 1991, 1992, 1993, 1994, 1995, 1996, 1997, 2000, 2001, 2004, 2005, 2011, 2012

Conference Outdoor Championships
- Men: 1921, 1922, 1923, 1924, 1926, 1929, 1932, 1933, 1936, 1937, 1939, 1940, 1941, 1942, 1950, 1966, 1987, 1989, 1990, 1995, 1996, 1998, 2000, 2002, 2004, 2009, 2010, 2013, 2016, 2023, 2024 Women: 1980, 1981, 1982, 1983, 1984, 1985, 1986, 1987, 1988, 1989, 1990, 1991, 1992, 1993, 1994, 1995, 2000, 2005

The Nebraska Cornhuskers men's and women's track and field teams compete as part of NCAA Division I, representing the University of Nebraska–Lincoln in the Big Ten Conference. The men's program became Nebraska's first varsity sport in 1889 and a women's team was established in 1976. The programs host indoor meets at the Bob Devaney Sports Center and outdoor meets at an incomplete facility on Nebraska Innovation Campus.

NU's men's team has won thirty-eight indoor and thirty-one outdoor conference championships, producing thirty-six individual national champions; the women have won twenty-four indoor and eighteen outdoor conference championships with thirty-seven national champions. Nebraska's only three team national titles came in the early 1980s in women's indoor competition, led by Jamaican sprinter and nine-time Olympic medalist Merlene Ottey. Gary Pepin retired in 2022 after four decades as Nebraska's head coach and assistant Justin St. Clair was named his replacement.

== Conference affiliations ==
- Independent (1889–1907)
- MVIAA / Big Eight Conference (1908–1996) (Note: In 1928, the ten member schools of the Missouri Valley Intercollegiate Athletic Association agreed to a splintering of the conference – Iowa State, Kansas, Kansas State, Missouri, Nebraska, and Oklahoma retained the MVIAA name and Drake, Grinnell, Oklahoma A&M (now Oklahoma State), and Washington University formed the Missouri Valley Conference. The MVIAA became commonly known as the Big Six, and later the Big Seven and Big Eight. Its name was officially changed to the Big Eight in 1964.)
- Big 12 Conference (1997–2011)
- Big Ten Conference (2012–present)

== Coaches ==
=== Men's coaching history ===
No.	Coach (Note: Men's coaching history unavailable prior to 1889.)	Tenure
1	J. E. Pearson	1898
2	Clinton Barr	1899
3	T. J. Hewitt	1900
4	W. Engel	1901
5	S. D. Clinton; Walter C. Booth	1902
6	Raymond G. Clapp	1903–1909
7	Osmond F. Field	1910–1911
8	Guy Reed	1912–1916
9	E. J. Stewart	1917–1919
10	Henry Schulte	1920–1938
11	Ed Weir	1939–1954
12	Jerry Lee	1955
13	Frank Sevigne	1956–1983
14	Gary Pepin	1984–2022
15	Justin St. Clair	2023–present

=== Women's coaching history ===
No.	Coach (Note: Women's coaching history unavailable prior to 1980.)	Tenure
1	Carol Frost	1980
2	Gary Pepin	1981–2022
3	Justin St. Clair	2023–present

=== Coaching staff ===
Name	Position	First year	Alma mater
Justin St. Clair	Head coach	2023	Boise State
Mike Bartolina	Assistant coach – pole vault	2023	Central Oklahoma
Megan Elliott	Assistant coach – middle / long distance	2024	Arkansas
Dusty Jonas	Assistant coach – high jump / combined events	2018	Nebraska
Jackie Streete-Thompson	Assistant coach – sprints	2026	New Mexico
Kareem Streete-Thompson	Assistant coach – sprints / horizontal jumps	2026	Rice
Matt Wackerly	Assistant coach – distance	2023	Ashland
Erik Whitsitt	Assistant coach – throws	2025	Boise State

== Venues ==
Nebraska has hosted indoor meets at the Bob Devaney Sports Center (originally the NU Sports Complex) since its construction in 1976. The facility, renovated in 2000 and 2011, can host 5,000 spectators. The arena has hosted several indoor conference championships.

For decades, Nebraska hosted outdoor meets at Ed Weir Stadium, located just northeast of Memorial Stadium. It was demolished in 2019 to make room for the Osborne Legacy Complex. The program moved to an unnamed, incomplete facility on Nebraska Innovation Campus, though it has not hosted any meets as permanent seating has yet to be installed. The $16.5-million, 2,000-seat complex is scheduled to be completed in time for NU to host the 2026 Big Ten Outdoor Track and Field Conference Championships.

== Awards and championships ==
=== Team national championships ===
- Women's indoor: 1982, 1983, 1984

=== Team conference championships ===
Men's indoor

- MVIAA / Big Eight: 1925, 1926, 1930, 1931, 1932, 1933, 1936, 1937, 1938, 1940, 1941, 1942, 1949, 1951, 1963, 1972, 1973, 1978, 1985, 1987, 1988, 1989, 1992, 1994, 1995, 1996
- Big 12: 1997, 1998, 2000, 2001, 2002, 2003, 2004, 2005, 2007
- Big Ten: 2015, 2016, 2019

Men's outdoor

- MVIAA / Big Eight: 1921, 1922, 1923, 1924, 1926, 1929, 1932, 1933, 1936, 1937, 1939, 1940, 1941, 1942, 1950, 1966, 1987, 1989, 1990, 1995, 1996
- Big 12: 1998, 2000, 2002, 2004, 2009, 2010
- Big Ten: 2013, 2016, 2023, 2024

Women's indoor

- Big Eight: 1980, 1981, 1982, 1983, 1984, 1985, 1986, 1987, 1988, 1989, 1990, 1991, 1992, 1993, 1994, 1995, 1996
- Big 12: 1997, 2000, 2001, 2004, 2005, 2011
- Big Ten: 2012

Women's outdoor

- Big Eight: 1980, 1981, 1982, 1983, 1984, 1985, 1986, 1987, 1988, 1989, 1990, 1991, 1992, 1993, 1994, 1995
- Big 12: 2000, 2005

=== Individual awards ===
Men's indoor

- Midwest Region athlete of the year: Jonah Wilson (2023 – field), Till Steinforth (2024 – field)
- Midwest Region coach of the year: Gary Pepin (2015, 2019), Justin St. Clair (2024)
- Conference athlete of the year: Burger Lambrechts Jr. (2022 – field), Jonah Wilson (2023 – field), Till Steinforth (2024 – field)
- Conference freshman of the year: Mayson Conner (2019), Brent Wetovick (2020)

Men's outdoor

- Midwest Region athlete of the year: Dusty Jonas (2008 – field), Darius Luff (2024 – track), Tyus Wilson (2024 – field)
- Midwest Region coach of the year: Gary Pepin (2009, 2010, 2013, 2016), Justin St. Clair (2023, 2024)
- Conference athlete of the year: Tyus Wilson (2024 – field)
- Conference freshman of the year: Mayson Conner (2019)

Women's indoor

- National coach of the year: Gary Pepin (1995)
- Midwest Region athlete of the year: Priscilla Lopes (2006 – track), Ashley Selig (2006 – field)
- Midwest Region coach of the year: Gary Pepin (2010, 2011, 2012)
- Conference athlete of the year: Mara Griva (2013 – field)

Women's outdoor

- Midwest Region athlete of the year: Mara Griva (2011 – field), Axelina Johansson (2023 – field), Rhema Otabor (2024 – field)
- Midwest Region coach of the year: Justin St. Clair (2023)
- Conference athlete of the year: Mara Griva (2011 – field), Axelina Johansson (2023 – field)
- Conference freshman of the year: Axelina Johansson (2022 – field)

=== Men's indoor national champions ===
- Charles Greene – 1965 (60 yards), 1966 (55 meters), 1967 (55 meters)
- Lennox Burgher – 1969 (triple jump)
- Jeff Lee – 1977 (55 meter hurdles)
- Paul Downes, Brian Dunnigan, Mark Fluitt, Scott Poehling – 1979 (4 × 800 meter relay)
- Kevin Coleman – 1992 (shot put), 1993 (shot put)
- Peter Malesev – 1995 (high jump)
- Miklos Roth, Alex Lamme, Jonah Kiptarus, Balázs Tölgyesi – 1996 (distance medley relay)
- Carl Myerscough – 2002 (shot put), 2003 (shot put)
- Arturs Abolins – 2006 (long jump)
- Dusty Jonas – 2008 (high jump)
- Nicholas Gordon – 2009 (long jump)

=== Men's outdoor national champions ===
- Roland Locke – 1926 (100 meters, 200 meters)
- Hugh Rhea – 1932 (shot put)
- Sam Francis – 1937 (shot put)
- Harold Hunt – 1941 (pole vault)
- Bob Ginn – 1942 (mile run)
- Howard Debus – 1943 (discus throw)
- Charles Greene – 1965 (100 meters), 1966 (100 meters), 1967 (100 meters)
- Peter Scott – 1966 (800 meters)
- Lennox Burgher – 1968 (triple jump)
- Eric Eshbach – 2003 (pole vault)
- Carl Myerscough – 2003 (shot put), 2004 (shot put)
- Dmitrijs Miļkevičs – 2005 (800 meters)
- Arturs Abolins – 2006 (long jump)
- Chad Wright – 2012 (discus throw)
- Miles Ukaoma – 2014 (400 meter hurdles)
- Nicholas Percy – 2016 (discus throw)
- Darius Luff – 2024 (100 meter hurdles)

=== Women's indoor national champions ===
- Donna Fox – 1978 (1000 yards) (Note: Until 1982, women's track and field events were governed by the Association for Intercollegiate Athletics for Women.)
- Sharon Burrill – 1979 (high jump)
- Merlene Ottey – 1980 (300 meters), 1981 (60 meters, 300 meters), 1984 (55 meters)
- Janet Burke – 1983 (55 meters)
- Angela Thacker – 1984 (long jump)
- Rhonda Blanford – 1985 (55 meter hurdles)
- Linetta Wilson – 1987 (500 meters)
- Shanelle Porter – 1993 (400 meters)
- Angee Henry – 1996 (long jump)
- Nicola Martial 1996 (triple jump)
- Tressa Thompson – 1997 (shot put)
- Priscilla Lopes – 2004 (60 meter hurdles)
- Ineta Radēviča – 2004 (triple jump)
- Anne Shadle – 2005 (mile run)
- Ashley Selig – 2005 (penathlon)

=== Women's outdoor national champions ===
- Merlene Ottey – 1980 (200 meters), 1981 (100 meters, 200 meters), 1982 (100 meters), 1983 (100 meters, 200 meters)
- Deborah James, Alicia McQueen, Rhonda Blanford, Merlene Ottey – 1982 (4 × 100 meter relay)
- Denise Thiemard – 1983 (javelin throw)
- Rhonda Blanford – 1985 (100 meter hurdles)
- Linetta Wilson – 1987 (400 meter hurdles)
- Sharron Powell – 1988 (800 meters)
- Renita Robinson – 1989 (triple jump)
- Ximena Restrepo – 1991 (400 meters)
- Shanelle Porter, Tranquil Wilson, Kim Walker, Ximena Restrepo – 1991 (4 × 400 meter relay)
- Nicola Martial – 1994 (triple jump), 1995 (triple jump)
- Angee Henry – 1996 (long jump)
- Tressa Thompson – 1997 (shot put), 1998 (shot put)
- Becky Breisch – 2003 (shot put), 2004 (discus throw)
- Ineta Radēviča – 2003 (triple jump), 2004 (triple jump)
- Anne Shadle – 2005 (1500 meters)
- Axelina Johansson – 2006 (shot put)
- Dace Ruskule – 2006 (discus throw)
- Rhema Otabor – 2023 (javelin throw), 2024 (javelin throw)

== Seasons ==
=== Men's seasons ===
Indoor conference champion	Outdoor conference champion

Year (Note: Results unavailable prior to the establishment of the MVIAA outdoor championship in 1908.)	Coach	Indoor conference (Note: The MVIAA indoor championship was established in 1922.)	Indoor postseason (Note: The first NCAA Division I Indoor Track and Field Championship was held in 1965.)	Outdoor conference	Outdoor postseason (Note: The first NCAA Division I Outdoor Track and Field Championship was held in 1921.)
MVIAA / Big Eight Conference (1908–1996)
1908	Raymond G. Clapp			T–5th	
1909	Raymond G. Clapp			3rd	
1910	Osmond F. Field			3rd	
1911	Osmond F. Field			3rd	
1912	Guy Reed			2nd	
1913	Guy Reed			3rd	
1914	Guy Reed			4th	
1915	Guy Reed			6th	
1916	Guy Reed			5th	
1917	E. J. Stewart			3rd	
1918	E. J. Stewart			2nd	
1919	E. J. Stewart			5th	
1920	Henry Schulte			4th	
1921	Henry Schulte			1st	NCAA 6th
1922	Henry Schulte	2nd		1st	NCAA T–21st
1923	Henry Schulte	2nd		1st	NCAA T–31st
1924	Henry Schulte	2nd		1st	Not held
1925	Henry Schulte	1st		2nd	
1926	Henry Schulte	1st		1st	NCAA 3rd
1927	Henry Schulte	2nd		3rd	NCAA – did not place
1928	Henry Schulte	4th		2nd	NCAA T–26th
1929	Henry Schulte	4th		1st	NCAA T–28th
1930	Henry Schulte	1st		2nd	NCAA T–12th
1931	Henry Schulte	1st		2nd	NCAA T–12th
1932	Henry Schulte	1st		1st	NCAA T–15th
1933	Henry Schulte	T–1st		1st	NCAA 10th
1934	Henry Schulte	3rd		2nd	NCAA T–22nd
1935	Henry Schulte	3rd		3rd	
1936	Henry Schulte	1st		1st	NCAA T–8th
1937	Henry Schulte	1st		1st	NCAA T–12th
1938	Henry Schulte	1st		2nd	
1939	Ed Weir	5th		1st	NCAA T–20th
1940	Ed Weir	1st		1st	NCAA 9th
1941	Ed Weir	1st		1st	NCAA 9th
1942	Ed Weir	1st		1st	NCAA 4th
1943	Ed Weir	2nd		2nd	NCAA 6th
1944	Ed Weir	4th		5th	
1945	Ed Weir	2nd		4th	NCAA T–13th
1946	Ed Weir	3rd		2nd	NCAA T–34th
1947	Ed Weir	2nd		2nd	
1948	Ed Weir	3rd		2nd	NCAA T–37th
1949	Ed Weir	1st		3rd	
1950	Ed Weir	2nd		1st	NCAA T–44th
1951	Ed Weir	1st		4th	NCAA T–41st
1952	Ed Weir	4th		4th	
1953	Ed Weir	3rd		3rd	NCAA T–34th
1954	Ed Weir	6th		7th	
1955	Jerry Lee	5th		7th	
1956	Frank Sevigne	7th		7th	
1957	Frank Sevigne	3rd		3rd	NCAA T–38th
1958	Frank Sevigne	2nd		2nd	NCAA T–8th
1959	Frank Sevigne	6th		7th	NCAA T–39th
1960	Frank Sevigne	5th		7th	NCAA T–39th
1961	Frank Sevigne	7th		7th	
1962	Frank Sevigne	2nd		2nd	
1963	Frank Sevigne	1st		3rd	
1964	Frank Sevigne	6th		2nd	NCAA University Division T–35th
1965	Frank Sevigne	3rd	NCAA T–7th	5th	NCAA University Division 6th
1966	Frank Sevigne	2nd	NCAA T–3rd	1st	NCAA University Division T–4th
1967	Frank Sevigne	3rd	NCAA T–14th	2nd	NCAA University Division T–19th
1968	Frank Sevigne	4th	NCAA T–9th	4th	NCAA University Division T–14th
1969	Frank Sevigne	3rd	NCAA 6th	3rd	NCAA University Division T–19th
1970	Frank Sevigne	4th		2nd	
1971	Frank Sevigne	5th	NCAA T–22nd	4th	NCAA University Division T–44th
1972	Frank Sevigne	1st	NCAA T–5th	7th	
1973	Frank Sevigne	1st	NCAA 8th	4th	
1974	Frank Sevigne	4th	NCAA T–32nd	5th	NCAA Division I T–52nd
1975	Frank Sevigne	8th		8th	
1976	Frank Sevigne	5th	NCAA T–51st	6th	NCAA Division I T–47th
1977	Frank Sevigne	3rd	NCAA T–10th	5th	NCAA Division I T–20th
1978	Frank Sevigne	1st	NCAA T–43rd	4th	
1979	Frank Sevigne	3rd	NCAA T–13th	4th	
1980	Frank Sevigne	2nd	NCAA T–37th	8th	
1981	Frank Sevigne	2nd	NCAA 10th	2nd	NCAA Division I T–36th
1982	Frank Sevigne	5th		7th	
1983	Frank Sevigne	8th		6th	
1984	Gary Pepin	3rd		2nd	NCAA Division I 75th
1985	Gary Pepin	1st	NCAA Division I 14th	3rd	
1986	Gary Pepin	3rd	NCAA Division I T–31st	2nd	
1987	Gary Pepin	1st	NCAA Division I T–44th	1st	NCAA Division I T–66th
1988	Gary Pepin	1st	NCAA Division I T–21st	3rd	
1989	Gary Pepin	1st	NCAA Division I T–36th	1st	NCAA Division I 7th
1990	Gary Pepin	2nd		1st	NCAA Division I T–15th
1991	Gary Pepin	2nd	NCAA Division I T–44th	2nd	NCAA Division I T–15th
1992	Gary Pepin	1st	NCAA Division I 14th	2nd	NCAA Division I T–35th
1993	Gary Pepin	2nd	NCAA Division I T–15th	2nd	NCAA Division I T–25th
1994	Gary Pepin	1st	NCAA Division I T–24th	2nd	NCAA Division I T–48th
1995	Gary Pepin	1st	NCAA Division I T–11th	1st	NCAA Division I T–37th
1996	Gary Pepin	1st	NCAA Division I runner-up	1st	NCAA Division I T–10th
Big 12 Conference (1997–2011)
1997	Gary Pepin	1st	NCAA Division I 18th	2nd	NCAA Division I 15th
1998	Gary Pepin	1st	NCAA Division I T–14th	1st	NCAA Division I 18th
1999	Gary Pepin	4th	NCAA Division I T–44th	2nd	NCAA Division I T–58th
2000	Gary Pepin	1st	NCAA Division I T–24th	1st	
2001	Gary Pepin	1st	NCAA Division I T–26th	7th	
2002	Gary Pepin	1st	NCAA Division I 14th	1st	NCAA Division I T–19th
2003	Gary Pepin	1st	NCAA Division I T–9th	3rd	NCAA Division I 5th
2004	Gary Pepin	1st	NCAA Division I T–19th	1st	NCAA Division I T–13th
2005	Gary Pepin	1st	NCAA Division I 7th	2nd	NCAA Division I 18th
2006	Gary Pepin	2nd	NCAA Division I T–12th	2nd	NCAA Division I 14th
2007	Gary Pepin	T–1st	NCAA Division I T–25th	5th	NCAA Division I 53rd
2008	Gary Pepin	2nd	NCAA Division I T–17th	4th	NCAA Division I 36th
2009	Gary Pepin	2nd	NCAA Division I T–5th	1st	NCAA Division I T–17th
2010	Gary Pepin	2nd	NCAA Division I T–26th	1st	NCAA Division I 16th
2011	Gary Pepin	3rd	NCAA Division I 17th	4th	NCAA Division I 38th
Big Ten Conference (2012–present)
2012	Gary Pepin	3rd	NCAA Division I T–23rd	2nd	NCAA Division I T–11th
2013	Gary Pepin	4th	NCAA Division I T–32nd	1st	NCAA Division I T–15th
2014	Gary Pepin	2nd	NCAA Division I T–17th	3rd	NCAA Division I 12th
2015	Gary Pepin	1st	NCAA Division I T–13th	2nd	NCAA Division I T–68th
2016	Gary Pepin	1st	NCAA Division I T–44th	1st	NCAA Division I T–10th
2017	Gary Pepin	4th	NCAA Division I T–49th	3rd	NCAA Division I T–69th
2018	Gary Pepin	2nd	NCAA Division I T–28th	3rd	NCAA Division I T–40th
2019	Gary Pepin	1st	NCAA Division I T–35th	4th	
2020	Gary Pepin	4th	Canceled due to the COVID-19 pandemic.		
2021	Gary Pepin	4th	NCAA Division I T–42nd	4th	NCAA Division I T–37th
2022	Gary Pepin	3rd	NCAA Division I T–24th	4th	NCAA Division I T–59th
2023	Justin St. Clair	2nd	NCAA Division I 8th	1st	NCAA Division I T–17th
2024	Justin St. Clair	2nd	NCAA Division I T–12th	1st	NCAA Division I T–13th
2025	Justin St. Clair	5th	NCAA Division I 12th	5th	NCAA Division I 35th

=== Women's seasons ===
National champion	Indoor conference champion	Outdoor conference champion

Year	Coach	Indoor conference	Indoor postseason (Note: The first women's indoor national championship was held in 1978.)	Outdoor conference	Outdoor postseason
Big Eight Conference (1976–1996)
1976	Unavailable	5th		4th	
1977	Unavailable	5th		4th	AIAW – did not place
1978	Unavailable	3rd		2nd	AIAW T–42nd
1979	Unavailable	4th		7th	
1980	Carol Frost	1st	AIAW 4th	1st	AIAW 7th
1981	Gary Pepin	1st	AIAW 4th	1st	AIAW Division I 6th
1982	Gary Pepin	1st	AIAW champion	1st	NCAA Division I 7th
1983	Gary Pepin	1st	NCAA champion	1st	NCAA Division I 3rd
1984	Gary Pepin	1st	NCAA champion	1st	NCAA Division I 5th
1985	Gary Pepin	1st	NCAA Division I 4th	1st	NCAA Division I T–12th
1986	Gary Pepin	1st	NCAA Division I 17th	1st	NCAA Division I T–27th
1987	Gary Pepin	1st	NCAA Division I 6th	1st	NCAA Division I 15th
1988	Gary Pepin	1st	NCAA Division I 5th	1st	NCAA Division I 5th
1989	Gary Pepin	1st	NCAA Division I 7th	1st	NCAA Division I 3rd
1990	Gary Pepin	1st	NCAA Division I T–9th	1st	NCAA Division I 16th
1991	Gary Pepin	1st	NCAA Division I 4th	1st	NCAA Division I 3rd
1992	Gary Pepin	1st	NCAA Division I T–7th	1st	NCAA Division I 3rd
1993	Gary Pepin	1st	NCAA Division I T–12th	1st	NCAA Division I T–14th
1994	Gary Pepin	1st	NCAA Division I T–5th	1st	NCAA Division I T–16th
1995	Gary Pepin	1st	NCAA Division I T–8th	1st	NCAA Division I T–6th
1996	Gary Pepin	1st	NCAA Division I T–4th	2nd	NCAA Division I 8th
Big 12 Conference (1997–2011)
1997	Gary Pepin	1st	NCAA Division I T–9th	2nd	NCAA Division I T–25th
1998	Gary Pepin	2nd	NCAA Division I T–43rd	2nd	NCAA Division I 8th
1999	Gary Pepin	2nd		4th	NCAA Division I T–14th
2000	Gary Pepin	1st	NCAA Division I T–8th	1st	
2001	Gary Pepin	1st	NCAA Division I T–54th	2nd	
2002	Gary Pepin	2nd		3rd	NCAA Division I 9th
2003	Gary Pepin	2nd	NCAA Division I 11th	2nd	NCAA Division I 5th
2004	Gary Pepin	1st	NCAA Division I 3rd	2nd	NCAA Division I 3rd
2005	Gary Pepin	1st	NCAA Division I 4th	1st	NCAA Division I 8th
2006	Gary Pepin	2nd	NCAA Division I T–13th	3rd	NCAA Division I T–4th
2007	Gary Pepin	5th	NCAA Division I T–67th	2nd	NCAA Division I 18th
2008	Gary Pepin	2nd	NCAA Division I 52nd	2nd	NCAA Division I T–43rd
2009	Gary Pepin	3rd	NCAA Division I 29th	3rd	NCAA Division I T–62nd
2010	Gary Pepin	3rd	NCAA Division I 27th	2nd	NCAA Division I 19th
2011	Gary Pepin	1st	NCAA Division I 17th	2nd	NCAA Division I 32nd
Big Ten Conference (2012–present)
2012	Gary Pepin	1st	NCAA Division I T–55th	T–2nd	NCAA Division I T–63rd
2013	Gary Pepin	2nd		6th	NCAA Division I T–32nd
2014	Gary Pepin	3rd		2nd	NCAA Division I T–19th
2015	Gary Pepin	T–5th		2nd	NCAA Division I T–66th
2016	Gary Pepin	6th	NCAA Division I T–42nd	3rd	NCAA Division I T–46th
2017	Gary Pepin	8th		6th	
2018	Gary Pepin	9th		T–5th	
2019	Gary Pepin	5th		4th	NCAA Division I T–48th
2020	Gary Pepin	10th	Canceled due to the COVID-19 pandemic.		
2021	Gary Pepin	6th		9th	
2022	Gary Pepin	T–7th	NCAA Division I T–47th	5th	NCAA Division I 14th
2023	Justin St. Clair	8th	NCAA Division I T–14th	3rd	NCAA Division I 8th
2024	Justin St. Clair	8th	NCAA Division I 25th	2nd	NCAA Division I 9th
2025	Justin St. Clair	6th	NCAA Division I T–20th	4th	NCAA Division I T–26th

== Olympians ==
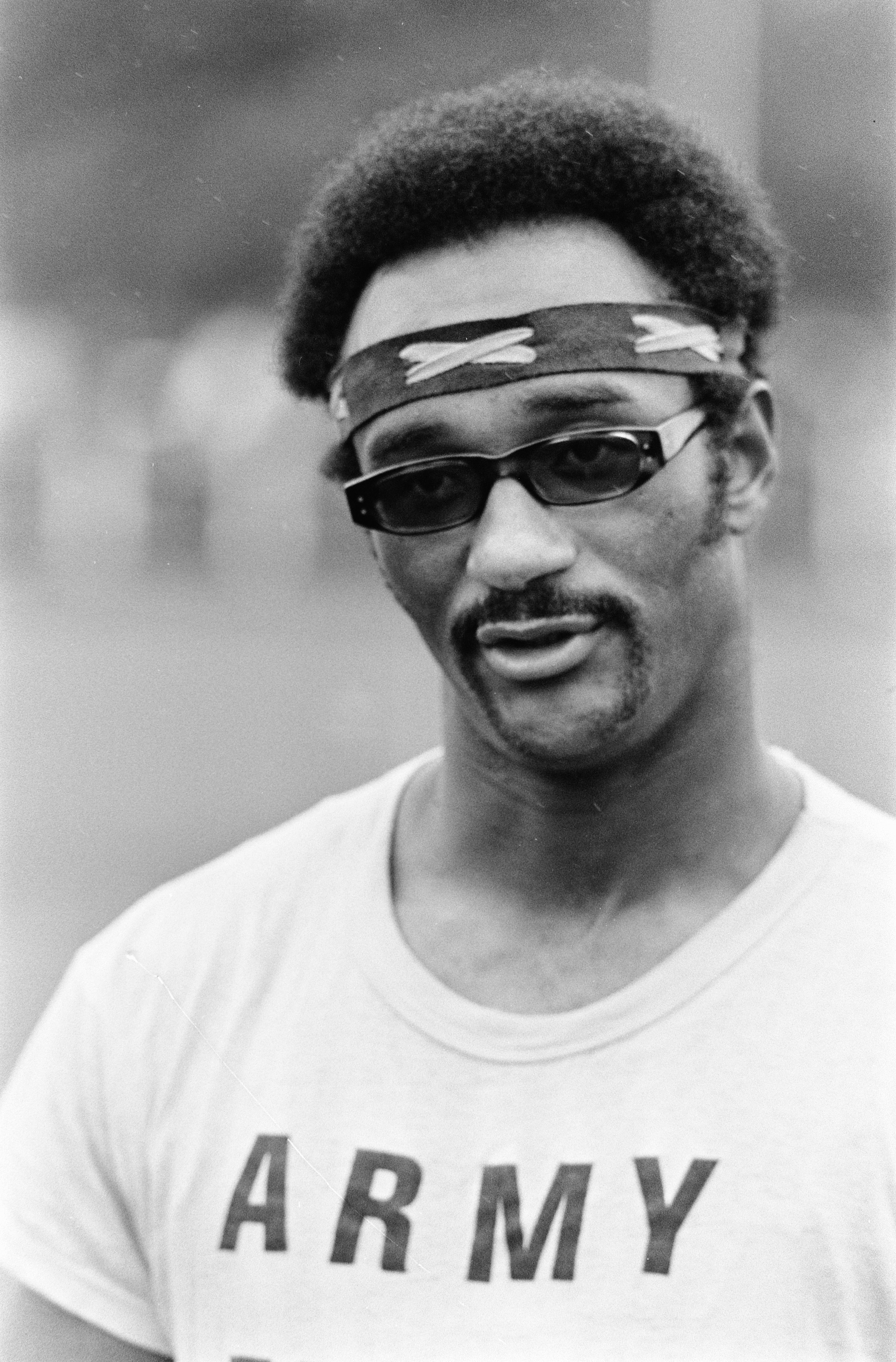
Sprinter Charlie Greene won two medals at the 1968 Summer Olympics in Mexico City

Fifty-one Nebraska track and field athletes have combined to compete in seventy-two Olympic Games, winning nineteen medals. Merlene Ottey earned nine total medals to become NU's most decorated Olympian in any sport.

Olympiad	Sport	Athlete	Country	Medal(s)
1912 (V) (Sweden) Stockholm	Sprinting	Lewis Anderson	United States	
1936 (XI) (Nazi Germany) Berlin	Shot put	Sam Francis	United States	
1956 (XVI) (Australia) Melbourne	Sprinting	Keith Gardner	Jamaica	
1960 (XVII) (Italy) Rome	Sprinting	Keith Gardner	British West Indies	(bronze) 4 × 400 m relay
1960 (XVII) (Italy) Rome	Sprinting	Joe Mullins	Canada	
1964 (XVIII) (Japan) Tokyo	Sprinting	Lynn Headley	Jamaica	
1968 (XIX) Mexico City	Discus	Carol Moseke	United States	
1968 (XIX) Mexico City	Sprinting	Clifton Forbes	Jamaica	
1968 (XIX) Mexico City	Sprinting	Lynn Headley	Jamaica	
1968 (XIX) Mexico City	Sprinting	Charlie Greene	United States	(gold) 4 x 100 m relay (bronze) 100 m
1972 (XX) (West Germany) Munich	Sprinting	Garth Case	Jamaica	
1972 (XX) (West Germany) Munich	Sprinting	Horace Levy	Jamaica	
1972 (XX) (West Germany) Munich	Sprinting	Leighton Priestley	Jamaica	
1972 (XX) (West Germany) Munich	Sprinting	Don Quarrie	Jamaica	
1976 (XXI) (Canada) Montreal	Sprinting	Leighton Priestley	Jamaica	
1976 (XXI) (Canada) Montreal	Sprinting	Don Quarrie	Jamaica	(gold) 200 m (silver) 100 m
1980 (XXII) (Soviet Union) Moscow	Sprinting	Merlene Ottey	Jamaica	(bronze) 200 m
1980 (XXII) (Soviet Union) Moscow	Sprinting	Don Quarrie	Jamaica	(bronze) 200 m
1984 (XXIII) (United States) Los Angeles	Long jump	Angela Thacker	United States	
1984 (XXIII) (United States) Los Angeles	Sprinting	Janet Burke	Jamaica	
1984 (XXIII) (United States) Los Angeles	Sprinting	Merlene Ottey	Jamaica	(bronze) 100 m (bronze) 200 m
1984 (XXIII) (United States) Los Angeles	Sprinting	Don Quarrie	Jamaica	(silver) 4 x 100 relay
1984 (XXIII) (United States) Los Angeles	Sprinting	Marcia Tate	Jamaica	
1984 (XXIII) (United States) Los Angeles	Sprinting	Dennis Wallace	Jamaica	
1984 (XXIII) (United States) Los Angeles	Sprinting	Bill Trott	Bermuda	
1988 (XXIV) (South Korea) Seoul	Javelin	Denise Thiémard	Switzerland	
1988 (XXIV) (South Korea) Seoul	Sprinting	Merlene Ottey	Jamaica	
1988 (XXIV) (South Korea) Seoul	Sprinting	Sharon Powell	Jamaica	
1988 (XXIV) (South Korea) Seoul	Sprinting	Marcia Tate	Jamaica	
1988 (XXIV) (South Korea) Seoul	Sprinting	Bill Trott	Bermuda	
1992 (XXV) (Spain) Barcelona	Sprinting	Mark Jackson	Canada	
1992 (XXV) (Spain) Barcelona	Sprinting	Karen Kruger	South Africa	
1992 (XXV) (Spain) Barcelona	Sprinting	Tamás Molnár	Hungary	
1992 (XXV) (Spain) Barcelona	Sprinting	Merlene Ottey	Jamaica	(bronze) 200 m
1992 (XXV) (Spain) Barcelona	Sprinting	Ximena Restrepo	Colombia	(bronze) 400 m
1996 (XXVI) (United States) Atlanta	Distance running	Dieudonné Kwizera	Burundi	
1996 (XXVI) (United States) Atlanta	Distance running	Balázs Tölgyesi	Hungary	
1996 (XXVI) (United States) Atlanta	Heptathlon	Patricia Nadler	Switzerland	
1996 (XXVI) (United States) Atlanta	Sprinting	Frank Mensah	Ghana	
1996 (XXVI) (United States) Atlanta	Sprinting	Merlene Ottey	Jamaica	(silver) 100 m (silver) 200 m (bronze) 4 x 100 m relay
1996 (XXVI) (United States) Atlanta	Sprinting	Linetta Wilson	United States	(gold) 4 x 400 m relay
1996 (XXVI) (United States) Atlanta	Triple jump	Nicola Martial	Guyana	
2000 (XXVII) (Australia) Sydney	Sprinting	Merlene Ottey	Jamaica	(silver) 4 x 100 m relay (bronze) 100 m
2000 (XXVII) (Australia) Sydney	Sprinting	Jimmy Pino	Colombia	
2000 (XXVII) (Australia) Sydney	Sprinting	Ximena Ristrepo	Colombia	
2000 (XXVII) (Australia) Sydney	Sprinting	Jelena Stanisavljević	(Socialist Federal Republic of Yugoslavia) Yugoslavia	
2004 (XXVIII) (Greece) Athens	Discus	Dace Ruskule	Latvia	
2004 (XXVIII) (Greece) Athens	Hurdles	Nenad Lončar	Serbia and Montenegro	
2004 (XXVIII) (Greece) Athens	Hurdles	Priscilla Lopes	Canada	
2004 (XXVIII) (Greece) Athens	Long jump	Ineta Radēviča	Latvia	
2004 (XXVIII) (Greece) Athens	Sprinting	Dmitrijs Miļkevičs	Latvia	
2004 (XXVIII) (Greece) Athens	Sprinting	Merlene Ottey	Slovenia	
2008 (XXIX) (China) Beijing	Heptathlon	Györgyi Zsivoczky-Farkas	Hungary	
2008 (XXIX) (China) Beijing	High jump	Dusty Jonas	United States	
2008 (XXIX) (China) Beijing	Hurdles	Priscilla Lopes	Canada	(bronze) 100 m hurdles
2008 (XXIX) (China) Beijing	Long jump	Ineta Radēviča	Latvia	
2008 (XXIX) (China) Beijing	Sprinting	Dmitrijs Miļkevičs	Latvia	
2012 (XXX) (United Kingdom) London	Heptathlon	Chantae McMillan	United States	
2012 (XXX) (United Kingdom) London	Heptathlon	Györgyi Zsivoczky-Farkas	Hungary	
2012 (XXX) (United Kingdom) London	Hurdles	Lehann Fourie	South Africa	
2012 (XXX) (United Kingdom) London	Long jump	Ineta Radēviča	Latvia	
2012 (XXX) (United Kingdom) London	Shot put	Carl Myerscough	(United Kingdom) Great Britain	
2016 (XXXI) (Brazil) Rio de Janeiro	Heptathlon	Györgyi Zsivoczky-Farkas	Hungary	
2016 (XXXI) (Brazil) Rio de Janeiro	High jump	Maruša Černjul	Slovenia	
2016 (XXXI) (Brazil) Rio de Janeiro	Hurdles	Miles Ukaoma	Nigeria	
2020 (XXXII) (Japan) Tokyo	Hurdles	Máté Koroknai	Hungary	
2024 (XXXIII) (France) Paris	Decathlon	Till Steinforth	Germany	
2024 (XXXIII) (France) Paris	Discus	Nicholas Percy	(United Kingdom) Great Britain	
2024 (XXXIII) (France) Paris	Javelin	Maggie Malone-Hardin	United States	
2024 (XXXIII) (France) Paris	Javelin	Rhema Otabor	(The Bahamas) Bahamas	
2024 (XXXIII) (France) Paris	Shot put	Miné de Klerk	South Africa	
2024 (XXXIII) (France) Paris	Shot put	Axelina Johansson	Sweden	
