= 1986 European Athletics Championships – Women's javelin throw =

Women's javelin throw at the European Athletics Championships

These are the official results of the Women's javelin throw event at the 1986 European Championships in Stuttgart, West Germany, held at Neckarstadion on 28 and 29 August 1986. All results were made with a rough surfaced javelin (old design).

== Medalists ==
Gold	(United Kingdom) Fatima Whitbread; Great Britain (GBR)
Silver	Petra Felke; East Germany (GDR)
Bronze	Beate Peters; West Germany (FRG)

== Abbreviations ==
- All results shown are in metres

Q	automatic qualification
q	qualification by rank
DNS	did not start
NM	no mark
WR	world record
AR	area record
NR	national record
PB	personal best
SB	season best

== Records ==
Standing records prior to the 1986 European Athletics Championships
World Record	Petra Felke (GDR)	75.40 m	June 4, 1985	Schwerin, East Germany
Event Record	Anna Verouli (GRE)	70.02 m	September 9, 1982	Athens, Greece
Broken records during the 1986 European Athletics Championships
World Record	Fatima Whitbread (GBR)	77.44 m	August 28, 1986	Stuttgart, West Germany
Event Record	Fatima Whitbread (GBR)	77.44 m	August 28, 1986	Stuttgart, West Germany

== Results ==
=== Final ===
29 August

Rank	Name	Nationality	Result	Notes
1st place, gold medalist(s)	Fatima Whitbread	United Kingdom	76.32	
2nd place, silver medalist(s)	Petra Felke	East Germany	72.52	
3rd place, bronze medalist(s)	Beate Peters	West Germany	68.04	
4	Tiina Lillak	Finland	66.66	
5	Genowefa Olejarz	Poland	63.34	
6	Natalya Yermolovich	Soviet Union	62.84	
7	Ingrid Thyssen	West Germany	62.42	
8	Irina Kostyuchenkova	Soviet Union	61.40	
9	Trine Solberg	Norway	59.52	
10	Anna Verouli	Greece	57.06	
11	Manuela Alizadeh	West Germany	56.20	
12	Denise Thiémard	Switzerland	55.32	

=== Qualification ===
28 August

Rank	Name	Nationality	Result	Notes
1	Fatima Whitbread	United Kingdom	77.44	WR Q
2	Petra Felke	East Germany	72.62	Q
3	Tiina Lillak	Finland	67.72	Q
4	Beate Peters	West Germany	66.12	Q
5	Ingrid Thyssen	West Germany	65.58	Q
6	Natalya Yermolovich	Soviet Union	64.52	Q
7	Anna Verouli	Greece	62.66	Q
8	Manuela Alizadeh	West Germany	62.50	Q
9	Irina Kostyuchenkova	Soviet Union	60.64	Q
10	Genowefa Olejarz	Poland	60.16	Q
11	Trine Solberg	Norway	59.66	Q
12	Denise Thiémard	Switzerland	59.60	Q
13	Karen Hough	United Kingdom	59.40	
14	Elisabet Nagy	Sweden	59.28	
15	Tuula Laaksalo	Finland	58.86	
16	Zsuzsa Malovecz	Hungary	56.44	
17	Danica Živanov	Yugoslavia	54.70	
18	Simone Frandsen	Denmark	53.70	

== Participation ==
According to an unofficial count, 18 athletes from 13 countries participated in the event.

- Denmark (1)
- East Germany (1)
- Finland (2)
- Greece (1)
- Hungary (1)
- Norway (1)
- Poland (1)
- Soviet Union (2)
- Sweden (1)
- Switzerland (1)
- United Kingdom (2)
- West Germany (3)
- Yugoslavia (1)

== See also ==
- 1982 Women's European Championships Javelin Throw (Athens)
- 1983 Women's World Championships Javelin Throw (Helsinki)
- 1984 Women's Olympic Javelin Throw (Los Angeles)
- 1987 Women's World Championships Javelin Throw (Rome)
- 1988 Women's Olympic Javelin Throw (Seoul)
- 1990 Women's European Championships Javelin Throw (Split)
