= BYU Cougars track and field =

College track and field team

- University: Brigham Young University
- Athletic director: Brian Santiago
- Head coach: Ed Eyestone (men); Diljeet Taylor (women)
- Conference: Big 12
- Location: Provo, Utah
- Outdoor track: Clarence F. Robison Track and Field Complex
- Nickname: Cougars
- Colors: Blue and white

NCAA Outdoor National Championships
- Men: 1970

Conference Indoor Championships
- Men: 1970, 1973, 1983, 1985, 1987, 1988, 1990, 1991, 1992, 1993, 1994, 1995, 1996, 1997, 1998, 1999, 2000, 2001, 2003, 2004, 2005, 2006, 2007, 2008, 2009, 2010, 2011, 2019, 2020, 2022, 2023; Women: 1991, 1992, 1993, 1995, 1996, 1997, 1998, 1999, 2000, 2001, 2002, 2003, 2004, 2005, 2007, 2009, 2010, 2011, 2022, 2023

Conference Outdoor Championships
- Men: 1968, 1969, 1971, 1973, 1974, 1983, 1985, 1986, 1987, 1988, 1999, 2000, 2001, 2002, 2003, 2004, 2005, 2006, 2007, 2008, 2009, 2010, 2011; Women: 1983, 1984, 1985, 1986, 1987, 1988, 1989, 1990, 1991, 1992, 1993, 1994, 1995, 1996, 1997, 1998, 1999, 2000, 2001, 2002, 2004, 2005, 2006, 2007, 2009, 2010, 2011

The BYU Cougars track and field is the track and field program representing Brigham Young University (BYU) in Provo, Utah. The program fields men's and women's teams for both indoor and outdoor events. Its teams have collectively won 108 conference championships and 1 national championship (1970 Men's Outdoor). BYU competes in the Big 12 Conference.

== History ==
The BYU Cougars track and field program traces its roots to the late 19th century at Brigham Young Academy, the precursor to BYU. The academy held intramural games between high school classes, and each year a BYA Field Day spotlighted track and field events. Competitions with other schools and independent athletic clubs for track and field began in 1899.

In 1949, Clarence Robison, who competed for BYU and was a 1948 Olympian, became the head coach and led the program for 39 years. He guided the men's team to a share of the 1970 NCAA University Division Outdoor Track and Field Championships — the program's only men's NCAA team title in the sport. In 2004, BYU's outdoor track facility was named the Clarence F. Robison Track in his honor.

Since 2000, the men's teams have been led by Ed Eyestone, who was himself a four-time NCAA individual champion (including the rare "Triple Crown" of Cross Country, 5K, and 10K titles in 1984-85) for BYU and a two-time U.S. Olympian. Since 2021, the women's teams have been led by Diljeet Taylor, a former three-time All-American in indoor and outdoor track and field.

In July 2023, BYU joined the Big 12 Conference.

== Athletes ==
As of August 2025, BYU has a total of 171 men and 106 women who have achieved individual first-team All-American status, including men's 11-time awardee Frankie Fredericks and women's 10-time awardees Amy Christiansen Palmer and Tiffany Lott-Hogan. Also, 40 men and 30 women have won individual and/or relay national championships, including men's three-time champions Ed Eyestone, Frank Fredericks, and Ralph Mann; and women's three-time champion Courtney Wayment.

Several athletes have gone on to compete professionally, and 55 men and 16 women have competed in the Olympic Games, including gold medalists Lasse Viren, Pekka Vasala, and Alma Richards.

== Results ==
The Cougars have collectively won 108 conference championships and 1 national championship (1970 Men's Outdoor).

== See also ==
- Category:BYU Cougars men's track and field athletes (62)
- Category:BYU Cougars women's track and field athletes (31)
