= Athletics at the 1988 Summer Olympics – Women's javelin throw =

Women's javelin throw at the Games of the XXIV Olympiad
- Pictogram of athletics
- Venues: Olympic Stadium
- Dates: September 25 (qualifications); September 26 (finals)
- Competitors: 29 from 18 nations
- Winning distance: 74.68 OR

Medalists
1st place, gold medalist(s)		Petra Felke; East Germany
2nd place, silver medalist(s)		Fatima Whitbread; Great Britain
3rd place, bronze medalist(s)		Beate Koch; East Germany

The Women's Javelin Throw event at the 1988 Summer Olympics in Seoul, South Korea had an entry list of 29 competitors, with two qualifying groups (29 throwers) before the final (12) took place on Monday September 26, 1988. The top 12 and all those reaching 63.00 metres advanced to the final. All results were made with a rough surfaced javelin (old design).

== Medalists ==
Gold	Petra Felke; East Germany
Silver	Fatima Whitbread; Great Britain
Bronze	Beate Koch; East Germany

== Schedule ==
- All times are Korea Standard Time (UTC+9)

Qualification Round
Group A	Group B
25.09.1988 – ??:??h	25.09.1988 – ??:??h
Final Round
26.09.1988 – ??:??h

== Abbreviations ==
Q	automatic qualification
q	qualification by rank
DNS	did not start
NM	no mark
WR	world record
OR	olympic record
AR	area record
NR	national record
PB	personal best
SB	season best

== Records ==
Standing records prior to the 1988 Summer Olympics
World Record	Petra Felke (GDR)	80.00 m	September 9, 1988	Potsdam, East Germany
Olympic Record	Tessa Sanderson (GBR)	69.56 m	August 6, 1984	Los Angeles, United States
Broken records during the 1988 Summer Olympics
Olympic Record	Petra Felke (GDR)	72.62 m	September 26, 1988	Seoul, South Korea
Olympic Record	Petra Felke (GDR)	74.68 m	September 26, 1988	Seoul, South Korea

== Qualification ==
=== Group A ===
Rank	Overall	Athlete	Attempts			Distance	Note
Rank	Overall	Athlete	1	2	3	Distance	Note
1	2	Petra Felke (GDR)	67.06	—	—	67.06 m	#263
2	3	Beate Koch (GDR)	66.86	—	—	66.86 m	#272
3	5	Natalya Yermolovich (URS)	X	64.44	—	64.44 m	#519
4	6	Zsuzsa Malovecz (HUN)	64.30	—	—	64.30 m	
5	11	Denise Thiémard (SUI)	55.18	61.74	55.60	61.74 m	
6	13	Tuula Laaksalo (FIN)	57.34	60.64	54.66	60.64 m	
7	14	Beate Peters (FRG)	X	X	60.20	60.20 m	
8	16	Laverne Eve (BAH)	X	57.48	60.02	60.02 m	
9	18	Trine Solberg (NOR)	57.76	56.90	58.82	58.82 m	
10	19	Anna Verouli (GRE)	57.60	58.52	X	58.52 m	
11	21	Tessa Sanderson (GBR)	54.18	56.70	56.26	56.70 m	
12	22	Zhou Yuanxiang (CHN)	53.66	52.80	56.36	56.36 m	
13	24	Lynda Sutfin (USA)	56.08	56.12	X	56.12 m	
14	27	Céline Chartrand (CAN)	47.64	46.18	54.10	54.10 m	
—	—	Nadine Auzeil (FRA)	X	X	X	NM	

=== Group B ===
Rank	Overall	Athlete	Attempts			Distance	Note
Rank	Overall	Athlete	1	2	3	Distance	Note
1	1	Fatima Whitbread (GBR)	54.90	X	68.44	68.44 m	#253
2	4	Antoaneta Selenska (BUL)	50.84	61.62	64.60	64.60 m	#52
3	7	Silke Renk (GDR)	63.64	—	—	63.64 m	#284
4	8	Ingrid Thyssen (FRG)	63.32	—	—	63.32 m	
5	9	Irina Kostyuchenkova (URS)	58.56	X	63.24	63.24 m	
6	10	Päivi Alafrantti (FIN)	62.82	58.54	59.82	62.82 m	
7	12	Donna Mayhew (USA)	61.56	60.62	59.08	61.56 m	#587
8	15	Tiina Lillak (FIN)	60.06	X	55.52	60.06 m	
9	17	Li Baolian (CHN)	56.64	58.92	56.62	58.92 m	
10	20	Karin Smith (USA)	57.42	53.86	57.94	57.94 m	
11	23	Emi Matsui (JPN)	50.70	X	56.26	56.26 m	
12	25	Sharon Gibson (GBR)	56.00	50.74	53.20	56.00 m	
13	26	Íris Grönfeldt (ISL)	X	54.28	50.84	54.28 m	
14	28	Yu Chun-ok (KOR)	X	44.92	48.26	48.26 m	

== Final ==
Rank	Athlete	Attempts						Distance
Rank	Athlete	1	2	3	4	5	6	Distance
1st place, gold medalist(s)	Petra Felke (GDR)	72.62	74.68	66.12	66.76	71.12	68.38	74.68 m
2nd place, silver medalist(s)	Fatima Whitbread (GBR)	61.98	67.46	66.58	64.86	67.82	70.32	70.32 m
3rd place, bronze medalist(s)	Beate Koch (GDR)	67.30	65.66	66.48	62.04	65.64	66.02	67.30 m
4	Irina Kostyuchenkova (URS)	64.34	67.00	63.12	63.42	63.10	X	67.00 m
5	Silke Renk (GDR)	60.86	58.74	63.98	64.60	64.74	66.38	66.38 m
6	Natalya Yermolovich (URS)	64.84	X	X	X	X	X	64.84 m
7	Donna Mayhew (USA)	57.52	X	61.78	59.72	X	56.74	61.78 m
8	Ingrid Thyssen (FRG)	60.76	60.12	56.66	X	59.64	58.28	60.76 m
9	Denise Thiémard (SUI)	57.58	57.20	58.54				58.54 m
10	Päivi Alafrantti (FIN)	58.20	55.86	56.46				58.20m
11	Antoaneta Selenska (BUL)	56.78	X	X				56.78 m
12	Zsuzsa Malovecz (HUN)	X	54.58	X				54.58 m

== See also ==
- 1986 Women's European Championships Javelin Throw (Stuttgart)
- 1987 Women's World Championships Javelin Throw (Rome)
- 1990 Women's European Championships Javelin Throw (Split)
- 1991 Women's World Championships Javelin Throw (Tokyo)
