= Anna Camp-Bennett =

American middle-distance runner (born 1998)

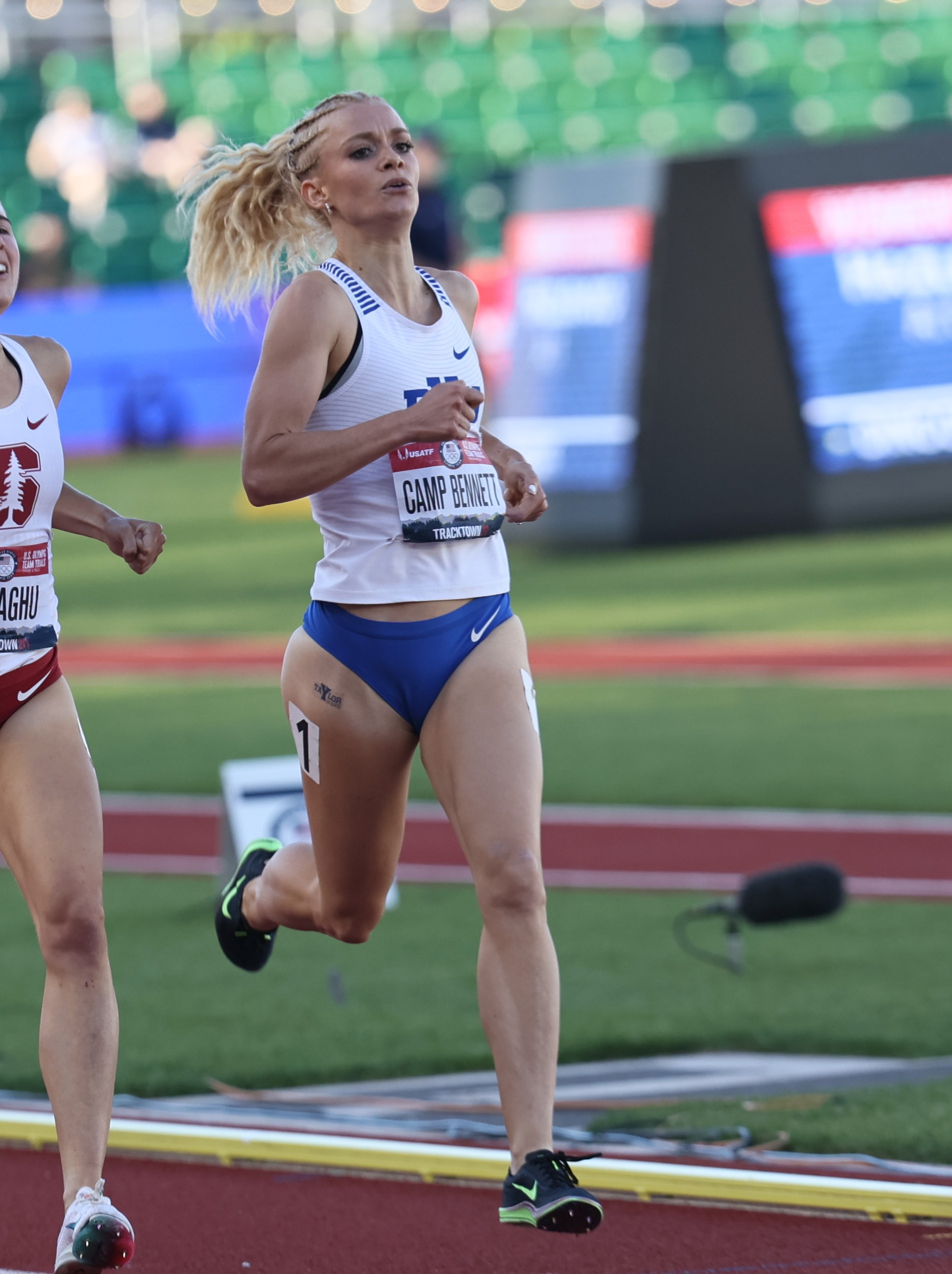
- Camp-Bennett at the 2020 US Olympic Trials

Personal information
- Born: Anna Camp; April 9, 1998 (age 28) Fillmore, Utah
- Education: Brigham Young University

Sport
- Sport: Track and Field
- Events: 800 m, 1500 m
- University team: BYU Cougars
- Club: TaylorMade Elite
- Coached by: Diljeet Taylor

Achievements and titles
- Personal bests: 800 m: 2:00.53 (Los Angeles 2024); 1500 m: 4:04.99 (Memphis 2023); 5000 m: 15:24.95 (Palo Alto 2024); Indoor; 1500 m: 4:08.86 (New York City 2024); Mile: 4:26.95 (New York City 2024); 3000 m: 8:49.87 (Boston 2023)

Anna Camp-Bennett (née Camp; born April 9, 1998) is an American middle-distance runner who competes in the 800 m and 1500 m. Competing for Brigham Young University, she won the 1500 m at the 2021 NCAA Outdoor Track and Field Championships.

After graduating from BYU, Camp-Bennett signed professionally with Adidas, and has since set personal bests of 2:00.60 in the 800 m, 4:04.99 in the 1500 m, and 4:26.95 in the mile, while remaining under the tutelage of her college coach Diljeet Taylor.

== Athletics career ==
=== High School ===
Camp-Bennett attended Millard High School in her hometown of Fillmore, Utah, from 2012 to 2016, where she was an eight-time state champion on the track in events ranging from the 400 m to the 3200 m. as well as being a three-time state cross country champion.

=== Brigham Young University ===
Because she competed at the 2A level in high school, a classification reserved for smaller schools, Camp-Bennett lacked the competition to run faster times to facilitate increased attention to be recruited. However, BYU women's track and field coach, Patrick Shane gave her an opportunity, citing her impressive range from the 400 m up to cross country.

==== 2017 ====
In fall 2016, Camp-Bennett enrolled at BYU and joined the Cougars track and field and cross country teams, making her Cougar debut during the 2017 track season. That year, she would go on to set a personal best of 2:08.18 and finish sixth at the USATF U20 Outdoor Championships in the 800 m, as well as qualify for the NCAA West Preliminary Round over 1500 m,

==== 2018 ====
The following year, 2018, competing in the 1500 m at the NCAA West Prelims, she finished just one spot out of qualifying for the NCAA Championships, but set a 4:18.08 personal best in the process.

==== 2019 ====
Competing at her first national championship in 2019, Camp-Bennett competed alongside Brenna Porter, Lauren Ellsworth, and Erica Birk in the DMR at the NCAA Indoor Championships. With Camp running the leadoff 1200 m leg, they placed second.

During the outdoor season, Camp-Bennett qualified for her first NCAA Outdoor Championships competing in the 800 m, after setting a personal best of 2:03.69 at the West Prelims. At the NCAA Championships in Austin, she qualified for the final, placing eighth.

==== 2021 ====
In March 2021, Camp-Bennett finished eleventh at the postponed 2020 NCAA Cross Country Championships, leading the BYU women to a national title. On the track, she qualified in both the 800 m and 1500 m for the NCAA Outdoor Championships in Eugene, Oregon. She didn't qualify for the final in the 800 m, but in the 1500 m she upset the field to take the win in a personal best and BYU school record of 4:08.53.

Just one week after her NCAA victory, she competed in the 1500 m at the US Olympic Trials, advancing to the semi-finals before being eliminated.

Camp-Bennett's final collegiate race came at the 2021 NCAA Cross Country Championships, in Tallahassee, Florida, where she placed 12th overall as part of the second place BYU women's team.

=== Professional ===
==== 2022 ====
In January 2022, Camp-Bennett signed a professional contract with Adidas, choosing to remain with her BYU coach, Diljeet Taylor. She made her pro debut at the 2022 Millrose Games, placing eleventh in the Wanamaker Mile. Outdoors, she concentrated on the 800 m, running a personal best of 2:00.60 at the Portland Track Festival and reaching the semi-finals of the USA Outdoor Championships.

==== 2023 ====
In 2023, she shifted focus to the 1500 m, running just one 800 m all year. She failed to reach the 1500 m final at the USA Outdoor Championships, but ran a personal best of 4:04.99 for third at the Ed Murphy Classic in Memphis, Tennessee.

==== 2024 ====
In February 2024, she ran a mile personal best of 4:26.95 to take eleventh at the Millrose Games and the following week placed third behind Nikki Hiltz and Emily Mackay over 1500 m at the USA Indoor Championships.

== Personal life ==
Camp-Bennett is the daughter of Carl and Kristine Camp and was raised in the town of Fillmore, Utah, a town of just 2,500 people. She has seven siblings: Katie, Josh, Mandee, Nathan, Jaren, Audrey and Kara and majored in Recreation Management at BYU.

In 2019, she married Kieran Bennett at the Payson Utah Temple. She and her husband are members of The Church of Jesus Christ of Latter-day Saints.

== Competition record ==
=== NCAA Championships ===
Representing the BYU Cougars
Year	Competitipm	Venue	Position	Event	Time
2019	NCAA Indoor Championships	Birmingham, Alabama	2nd	DMR	10:54.14
2019	NCAA Outdoor Championships	Austin, Texas	8th	800 m	2:05.93
2021	NCAA Cross Country Championships (2020)	Stillwater, Oklahoma	11th	6 km	20:28.3
2021	NCAA Outdoor Championships	Eugene, Oregon	10th	800 m (h)	2:03.95
2021	NCAA Outdoor Championships	Eugene, Oregon	1st	1500 m	4:08.53
2021	NCAA Cross Country Championships	Tallahassee, Florida	12th	6 km	19:39.3

=== USA Championships ===
Representing the BYU Cougars (2017–2021) and Adidas (2022–present)
Year	Competition	Venue	Position	Event	Time
2017	USA U20 Championships	Sacramento, California	6th	800 m	2:09.02
2021	US Olympic Trials	Eugene, Oregon	16th (sf)	1500 m	4:12.05
2022	USA Indoor Championships	Spokane, Washington	12th	3000 m	9:15.95
2022	USA Outdoor Championships	Eugene, Oregon	13th (sf)	800 m	2:02.31
2023	USA Outdoor Championships	Eugene, Oregon	13th (sf)	1500 m	4:13.36
2024	USA Indoor Championships	Albuquerque, New Mexico	3rd	1500 m	4;10.20
2024	USA 1 Mile Road Championships	Des Moines, Iowa	2nd	Mile	4:33.67
