= 1989 NCAA Division I Outdoor Track and Field Championships =

- Men's Champion: LSU (2nd title); Women's Champion: LSU (3rd title)
- Edition: 68th (Men); 8th (Women)
- Dates: May 31 − June 3, 1989
- Host city: Provo, Utah
- Venue: Clarence F. Robison Track and Field Complex; Brigham Young University

The 1989 NCAA Division I Outdoor Track and Field Championships were contested May 31 − June 3 at the Clarence F. Robison Track and Field Complex at Brigham Young University in Provo, Utah in order to determine the individual and team national champions of men's and women's collegiate Division I outdoor track and field events in the United States.

These were the 68th annual men's championships and the eighth annual women's championships. This was the Cougars' fourth time hosting the event and the first since 1982.

LSU topped both the men's and women's standings, the first time this occurred in the eight years since the NCAA expanded the championship to include women's events in 1982; it was the LSU men's team's second team title (and first since 1934−a span of fifty-five years) and the third consecutive, as well as third overall, for the Lady Tigers. This would go on to be the third of LSU's eleven consecutive women's national championships in track and field between 1987 and 1997.

== Team results ==
- Note: Top 10 only
- (H) = Hosts
- Full results

=== Men's standings ===
Rank	Team	Points
1st place, gold medalist(s)	LSU	53
2nd place, silver medalist(s)	Texas A&M	51
3rd place, bronze medalist(s)	Florida	39
4	Oregon	36
5	Texas	33
6	UCLA	28
7	Nebraska	26
8	TCU	24
9	Arkansas	23
10	Arizona	21

=== Women's standings ===
Rank	Team	Points
1st place, gold medalist(s)	LSU	86
2nd place, silver medalist(s)	UCLA	47
3rd place, bronze medalist(s)	Nebraska	37
4	Texas Southern	34
5	Arizona	25
6	Texas	23
7	Illinois	23
8	USC	19
9	BYU (H); Harvard; Kentucky; Villanova	18
