= Beate Peters =

German javelin thrower (born 1959)

Personal information
- Full name: Beate Edeltraud Peters
- Nationality: West Germany
- Born: 12 October 1959 (age 66) Marl, North Rhine-Westphalia, West Germany
- Height: 1.78 m (5 ft 10 in)
- Weight: 76 kg (168 lb)

Sport
- Country: West Germany
- Sport: Athletics
- Event: Javelin throw
- Club: TV Wattenscheid

Achievements and titles
- Personal best: 69.56 (1986)
Medal record
Women's athletics
Representing West Germany
World Championships
Bronze medal – third place	1987 Rome	Javelin
European Championships
Bronze medal – third place	1986 Stuttgart	Javelin
Universiade
Gold medal – first place	1983 Edmonton	Javelin

Beate Edeltraud Peters (born 12 October 1959) is a retired West German javelin thrower.

== Biography ==
She finished seventh at the 1983 World Championships and the 1984 Summer Olympics. She then won bronze medals at the 1986 European Championships and the 1987 World Championships. She also participated at the 1988 Olympics, but did not reach the final.

She became West German champion in 1985 and 1986. She represented the clubs OSC Dortmund and TV Wattenscheid.

Her personal best throw was 69.56 metres with the old javelin type, achieved in July 1986 in Berlin. This ranks her tenth among German old-type-javelin throwers, behind Petra Felke (who held the world record), Antje Kempe, Silke Renk, Beate Koch, Karen Forkel, Tanja Damaske, Ruth Fuchs, Ingrid Thyssen and Susanne Jung.

== Private life ==
Beate Peters is openly lesbian and lives with retired heptathlete Sabine Braun.

== Achievements ==
Year	Competition	Venue	Position	Notes
Representing West Germany
1983	World Championships	Helsinki, Finland	7th	62.42 m
1984	Olympic Games	Los Angeles, United States	7th	62.34 m
1988	Olympic Games	Seoul, South Korea	14th	60.20 m
