= Athletics at the 1987 Pan American Games – Women's javelin throw =

Women's javelin throw at the Pan American Games

The women's javelin throw event at the 1987 Pan American Games was held in Indianapolis, United States on 16 August.

== Results ==
| Rank | Name | Nationality | #1 | #2 | #3 | #4 | #5 | #6 | Result | Notes |
|---|---|---|---|---|---|---|---|---|---|---|
| 1st place, gold medalist(s) | Ivonne Leal | Cuba | 56.58 | 55.56 | 60.24 | 63.70 | x | x | 63.70 | |
| 2nd place, silver medalist(s) | María Caridad Colón | Cuba | 57.38 | 59.66 | x | x | 57.42 | 61.66 | 61.66 | |
| 3rd place, bronze medalist(s) | Marieta Riera | Venezuela | 53.90 | 53.82 | 52.44 | 57.10 | 53.58 | 52.94 | 57.10 | NR |
| 4 | Sueli dos Santos | Brazil | 51.34 | x | 56.74 | 51.04 | 57.02 | 52.26 | 57.02 | |
| 5 | Laverne Eve | Bahamas | 52.60 | 55.42 | 55.70 | 54.34 | x | x | 55.70 | |
| 6 | Lynda Sutfin | United States | 49.72 | 53.84 | 54.64 | 51.50 | 53.34 | x | 54.64 | |
| 7 | Cathie Wilson | United States | x | 44.04 | x | 52.74 | 51.64 | x | 52.74 | |
| 8 | Celine Chartrand | Canada | 52.60 | x | 50.04 | x | x | x | 52.60 | |
