= Natalya Yermolovich =

Personal information
- Born: April 29, 1964 (age 62) Homel, Belarus SSR, Soviet Union

Sport
- Sport: Track and field

Natalya Yermolovich (Belarusian: Натальля Ермаловіч; Russian: Наталья Ермолович; born April 29, 1964) is a retired female javelin thrower who represented the Soviet Union at the 1988 Summer Olympics. She was born Natalya Kalenchukova. Yermolovich set her personal best (69.86 metres) in 1985.

== Achievements ==
Year	Competition	Venue	Position	Notes
Representing Soviet Union
1986	European Championships	Stuttgart, West Germany	6th	62.84 m
1987	World Championships	Rome, Italy	7th	65.52 m
1988	Olympic Games	Seoul, South Korea	6th	64.84 m
