= Courtney Wayment =

American athlete (born 1998)

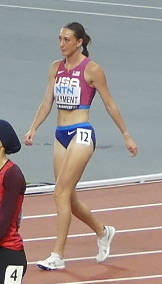
- Wayment in 2023

Personal information
- Full name: Courtney Wayment-Smith
- Nationality: United States
- Born: August 4, 1998 (age 27)
- Home town: Layton, Utah, U.S.
- Height: 5 ft 7 in (171 cm)

Sport
- Sport: Track and field
- Events: 3000 m steeplechase, Mile
- College team: BYU Cougars
- Club: On Running
- Turned pro: 2022
- Coached by: Diljeet Taylor (2016–present)

Achievements and titles
- Personal bests: 3000 m steeplechase: 9:06.50 (USA Olympic Trials 2024); 800 m: 2:05.76 (Seattle 2021); 1500 m: 4:12.81 (Stanford 2022); 5000 m: 14:49.78 (Boston 2024)

Courtney Wayment-Smith (née Wayment; born August 4, 1998) is an American track and field athlete. Originally from Layton, Utah, Wayment first represented On Running and competed for Team USA in the 3000 m steeplechase at the 2024 Summer Olympics, finishing 12th with a time of 9:13.6. On January 1, 2026, Wayment moved from On Running to Nike.

Prior to going pro, Wayment competed for the BYU Cougars. There she won four NCAA Division I championships and was an eight-time All-American. In high school, Wayment was Gatorade Player of the Year and a three-time UHSAA state champion.

Wayment is a member of The Church of Jesus Christ of Latter-day Saints. She is married to Tanner Smith and competes under her maiden name Courtney Wayment.
