= Susanne Jung =

East German javelin thrower

Personal information
- Born: 17 May 1963 (age 63) Meiningen, East Germany

Sport
- Sport: Track and field
Medal record
Representing East Germany
Summer Universiade
Silver medal – second place	1987 Zagreb	Javelin throw

Susanne Jung (born 17 May 1963) is a retired East German javelin thrower. She represented the club SC Turbine Erfurt.

She won the silver medal at the 1987 Summer Universiade and finished fifth at the 1987 World Championships.

Her personal best throw was 69.60 metres with the old javelin type, achieved in August 1987 in Potsdam. This ranks her ninth among German old-type-javelin throwers, behind Petra Felke (who held the world record), Antje Kempe, Silke Renk, Beate Koch, Karen Forkel, Tanja Damaske, Ruth Fuchs and Ingrid Thyssen.
