= Ivonne Leal =

Cuban javelin thrower

Personal information
- Born: February 27, 1966 (age 60) San Nicolas de Bari, Cuba

Sport
- Sport: Track and field
Medal record
Representing Cuba
Pan American Games
Gold medal – first place	1987 Indianapolis	Javelin throw
Central American and Caribbean Games
Silver medal – second place	1986 Santiago	Javelin throw
Summer Universiade
Gold medal – first place	1985 Kobe	Javelin throw

Ivonne de la Caridad Leal Bravo (born February 27, 1966) is a retired javelin thrower from Cuba. She is best known for winning the gold medal in the women's javelin throw event at the 1985 Summer Universiade in Kobe, Japan.

== Achievements ==
Year	Tournament	Venue	Result	Extra
Representing Cuba
1985	Universiade	Kobe, Japan	1st	71.82 m
1986	Central American and Caribbean Games	Santiago, Dominican Republic	2nd	56.56 m
1987	Pan American Games	Indianapolis, United States	1st	63.70 m
1987	World Championships	Rome, Italy	8th	64.90 m
