= Yu Chun-ok =

South Korean javelin thrower (born 1969)

Personal information
- Nationality: South Korean
- Born: 15 August 1969 (age 56)

Sport
- Sport: Athletics
- Event: Javelin throw

Yu Chun-ok (born 15 August 1969) is a South Korean athlete. She competed in the women's javelin throw at the 1988 Summer Olympics.
