= Clarence F. Robison Track and Field Complex =

Clarence F. Robison Track & Field Complex
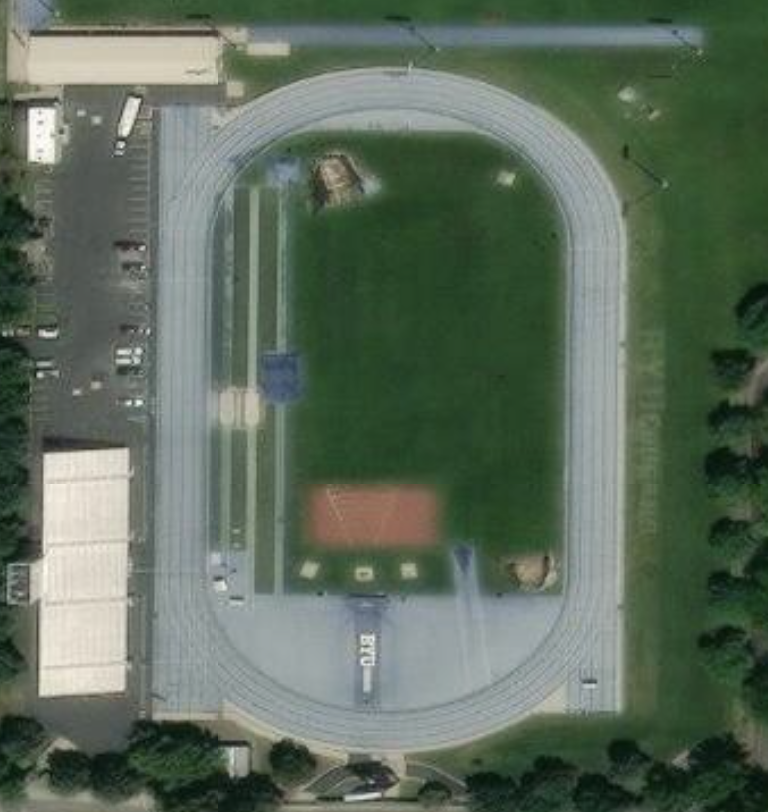
- View of the facility from above (NASA Earthdata search)
- Interactive map of Clarence F. Robison Track & Field Complex
- Address: 1600 N Canyon Rd; Provo, Utah, 84604
- Location: Brigham Young University; Provo, Utah, U.S.
- Coordinates: 40.253°N 111.6554°W
- Elevation: 4,633 feet (1,412 m)
- Owner: Brigham Young University
- Operator: Brigham Young University

Construction
- Opened: 1982

The Clarence F. Robison Track and Field Complex is a track & field stadium located on the campus of Brigham Young University in Provo, Utah that has served as the home of BYU track & field since 1982.

The stadium was built after Cougar Stadium was expanded and specialized for football, since the track it housed was removed in the process. It was renamed for Clarence F. Robison on April 24, 2004 during the annual Robison Invitational. Robison was a former BYU athlete who also coached the Cougars for 40 years (1949-1989).

Due to its high elevation, the Clarence F. Robison Track is a popular training spot for professional runners looking to do altitude training. The altitude also contributes to the success of BYU's distance runners.

== Facilities ==
The facility sits in the shadow of the Wasatch Mountain Range, which provides a surreal backdrop for track meets. Every event can be contested within the grounds of the facility since throwing and jumping areas are located on the infield. A 2002 renovation laid down a new Mondo Super X surface and improved drainage, upgrading the track to state of the art status. The track was also resurfaced in 2015.

== Events ==
Some of the major events the facility has hosted include the NCAA Championships in 1982 and 1989, the NCAA West Regionals in 2006, and the Mountain West Conference Championships in 2000 and 2006. It is also host to the annual Robison Invitational along with numerous high school meets.
