= Manuela Alizadeh =

German javelin thrower

Personal information
- Born: 29 January 1963 (age 63) Stuttgart, West Germany

Sport
- Sport: Track and field

Dr. Manuela Alizadeh (born 29 January 1963) is a retired West German javelin thrower.

== Sporting career ==
She finished eleventh at the 1986 European Championships and tenth at the 1987 World Championships. IAAF Grand Prix Champion 1988.

Her personal best throw was 65.34 metres with the old javelin type, achieved in September 1988 in Dormagen. She represented the clubs LG Kappelberg, SpVgg Feuerbach, LAV Bayer Uerdingen and OSC Berlin.

== Research ==
- Stigmatization of obese individuals by human resource professionals: An experimental study - Katrin Giehl, Manuela Alizadeh, Prof. Dr. A. Thiel. Article (PDF Available) in BMC Public Health 12(1):525 · July 2012.
- Stereotyping of Overweight Children by their Contemporaries. Prof. Dr. A. Thiel, Manuela Alizadeh et al. - Article in PPmP - Psychotherapie · Psychosomatik · Medizinische Psychologie 58(12):e16-24 · January 2009
