= Denise Thiémard =

Swiss javelin thrower

Denise Thiémard (born 24 March 1960 in Orsonnens) is a retired Swiss javelin thrower. Her personal best throw was 64.04 metres with the old javelin type, achieved in July 1987 in Oslo.

She finished twelfth at the 1986 European Championships and ninth at the 1988 Olympic Games. She became Swiss champion in 1983 and the years 1985-1992.

Representing the Nebraska Cornhuskers track and field team, Thiémard won the 1983 NCAA Division I Outdoor Track and Field Championships in the javelin.

== Achievements ==
Year	Competition	Venue	Position	Notes
Representing Switzerland
1988	Olympic Games	Seoul, South Korea	9th	58.54 m
