= Clarence Robison =

American track athlete and coach

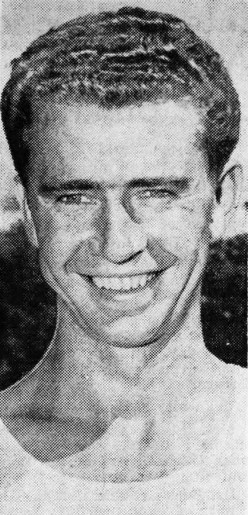
- Robison, circa 1949

Personal information
- Born: Clarence Franklin Robison; June 18, 1923 Fillmore, Utah, U.S.
- Died: September 26, 2006 (aged 83) Provo, Utah, U.S.
- Education: Millard High School
- Height: 1.92 m (6 ft 4 in)
- Weight: 77 kg (170 lb)

Sport
- Sport: Track and field
- Event: 5,000 metres
- University team: Brigham Young University Cougars

Achievements and titles
- Personal best: 14:44.2 (1948)
Medal record
Representing the United States
Olympic Games

Clarence Robison

Personal details
- Resting place: Provo Cemetery
- Spouse: Monita Turley (m. 1950, still alive)
- Children: 9 total, 3 daughters, 6 sons

Military service
- Allegiance: United States
- Branch/service: United States Navy
- Years of service: 1943–1946
- Rank: Officer

Clarence Franklin Robison (June 18, 1923 – September 26, 2006) was an American track athlete and coach at Brigham Young University (BYU). As a collegiate runner, Robison competed in the 880, one-mile, and two-mile, setting conference records in the latter two events. Robison put his track career on hold to enlist in the U.S. Navy during World War II and served for three years.

Following the war, Robison capped his career by competing as a member of the U.S. Olympic team and U.S. National Track and Field team.

Robison was the head coach at BYU for 40 years. During that time, he guided his teams to 19 WAC championships and a co-national championship. He coached 118 All-Americans and 26 Olympians.

== Early life ==
Robison was born in Fillmore, Utah, on June 18, 1923. His parents were Archie and Charlottie (Lottie) Robison. He had two older siblings, Rolf and Jene. They lived on a 200-acre farm, growing mainly apples, peaches, pears and watermelons.

In his teenage years, Robison worked for the forest service. He spent his summers in the mountains he loved, building fences and maintaining trails. At the end of each day, when the other workers would load into trucks to make the journey back to town, Robison would run home. His natural running abilities soon became apparent to all who knew him.

As a senior at Millard High School, Robison won the 880-yard run at the state track and field championships. He also played on the school's basketball team.

== College career ==
In 1940, Robison enrolled at BYU in Provo, Utah. He competed on the track and cross-country teams. At 6-foot-4, he towered over most of the runners he competed against. Robison also made the university's basketball team, but following the advice of his coaches, he opted to focus his efforts solely on track.

Over the course of his collegiate career, Robison lost only one race. He competed in the 880, one-mile, and two-mile, setting conference records in the one-mile and two-mile events.

In 1943, with the country embroiled in World War II, Robison enlisted in the U.S. Navy. He attended officers training school in Albuquerque, New Mexico. While taking classes at the University of New Mexico, he played on the school's basketball team.

After returning from the war, Robison resumed his track career. He then moved to Ann Arbor, Michigan, to attend the University of Michigan, where he earned a master's degree in health science. (He got his B.S. degree from BYU in 1949 and his M.S. from the University of Michigan in 1955.)

== Olympics and international running career ==
In 1948, Robison traveled to Chicago, Illinois, to compete in the U.S. Olympic Track and Field Trials. He was among the top finishers in the 5,000-meter run, earning a place on Team USA. He traveled with the team to London, where he competed in the Games of the XIV Olympiad. Because of the disruption of World War II, the 1948 Olympics were the first Summer Olympics held since the 1936 Games in Berlin.

The following year, Robison returned to Europe with the U.S. National Track and Field team. Of the 16 races Robison ran in Europe that summer, he won 12 of them.

== Coaching career ==
Robison returned to BYU in 1949 and was promptly offered a job as head coach of the track and field team. Though only 25 years old at the time, he agreed to discontinue his own professional career in order to help build BYU's track program.

Over the next 40 years, Robison helped BYU track and field rise to prominence on the national scene. His teams won 19 WAC championships and 118 of his athletes were named All-Americans. Additionally, 26 of them would go on to be Olympians. He helped make BYU one of the top-20 in the United States for distance runners. He coached more than 100 all-Americans, including more than 20 national champions, and 26 Olympians.

Robison also strived to establish BYU track and field as a worldwide presence, organizing six trips to Europe for international competition.

In 1970, Robison's team claimed a share of the national title by winning the Track and Field Federation championship in Lexington, Kentucky. This was the first-ever national championship for a BYU athletic program. Robison's teams finished in the top 10 at the NCAA Championships on nine other occasions.

Robison was named Coach of the Year in the Skyline Conference five times and received the Pembroke Award in 1975. He served on the NCAA Rules Committee and later served as president of the U.S. Track Coaches Association.

Robison retired in 1989 at age 65. He left a legacy of progressive coaching and thoughtful mentorship. Many of his athletes viewed him as a father figure and cherished his personalized teaching style. Robison was inducted into the Utah Sports Hall of Fame (1970), the BYU Hall of Fame (1976), and the U.S. Track Coaches Hall of Fame (2002). In 2004, BYU paid tribute to “Coach Robbie” by naming the outdoor track and field facility after him, officially named Clarence F. Robison Track.

== In popular culture ==
Robison was featured in a church magazine story, July 2016 issue, about how living the Word of Wisdom helped him beat the Danish champion in Copenhagen, Denmark.

== Personal ==
Robison married Monita Turley on March 31, 1950. They had nine children and 41 grandchildren. Robison was a member of the Church of Jesus Christ of Latter-day Saints. He and his wife served in many leadership positions in their church, including assignments that relocated them to England and Turkey.

Several of Robison's children and grandchildren have competed in track at the collegiate level. His son Mark Robison has also been a BYU track coach.
