= Irina Kostyuchenkova =

Soviet and Ukrainian athlete (1961–2023)

Personal information
- Born: 11 May 1961 Chelyabinsk, Soviet Union
- Died: 31 March 2023 (aged 61) Alushta, Ukraine

Sport
- Sport: Track and field
Medal record
Representing Soviet Union
Summer Universiade
Gold medal – first place	1987 Zagreb	Javelin throw

Irina Kostyuchenkova (Ukrainian: Ірина Анатоліївна Костюченкова, Russian: Ирина Костюченкова; 11 May 1961 – 31 March 2023) was a javelin thrower who represented the Soviet Union, and later Ukraine.

Kostyuchenkova was born in Chelyabinsk. She is best known for winning the gold medal in the women's javelin throw event at the 1987 Summer Universiade in Zagreb, FR Yugoslavia. She later became a coach.

Kostyuchenkova died on 31 March 2023, at the age of 61. She and her mother were strangled by her 33-year-old son in Alushta.

Her son suffered from severe psychiatric illness.

== Achievements ==
Year	Competition	Venue	Position	Notes
Representing Soviet Union
1986	European Championships	Stuttgart, West Germany	8th	61.40 m
1987	Summer Universiade	Zagreb, FR Yugoslavia	1st	66.72 m
1987	World Championships	Rome, Italy	12th	60.60 m
1988	Olympic Games	Seoul, South Korea	4th	67.00 m PB
Representing Unified Team
1991	World Championships	Tokyo, Japan	17th (q)	57.60 m
1992	Olympic Games	Barcelona, Spain	20th (q)	57.96 m
1992	World Cup	Havana, Cuba	2nd	58.10 m
Representing Ukraine
