= Zhou Yuanxiang =

Chinese javelin thrower

Personal information
- Nationality: Chinese
- Born: 30 January 1964 (age 62) Yingcheng, China

Sport
- Sport: Athletics
- Event: Javelin throw

Zhou Yuanxiang (born 30 January 1964) is a Chinese athlete. She competed in the women's javelin throw at the 1988 Summer Olympics.
