= Linetta Wilson =

American athletics competitor

Personal information
- Born: October 11, 1967 (age 58) Pasadena, California, U.S.
Medal record
Women's athletics
Representing United States
Olympic Games
Gold medal – first place	1996 Atlanta	4 × 400 m relay

Linetta A. Wilson (born October 11, 1967) is a former 1996 Olympic gold medalist in the women's 4 × 400 meter relay for the United States. She competed in the opening round with Rochelle Stevens, Kim Graham, and Maicel Malone and was replaced by Jearl Miles in the Final.

Wilson grew up in Pasadena, attending Muir High School. She twice placed second to Chewuakii "Choo Choo" Knighten in the CIF State Championships in a still standing fastest non-winning time, She also excelled in hurdles, placing in the state meet twice. She is a member of team that may become the permanent 4 × 100 meter shuttle hurdle relay (30") High School Recordholders—the official height of the hurdles has been changed.

She continued to the University of Nebraska–Lincoln where she won an Indoor and Outdoor NCAA National Championship and was on three of their Big 8 Championship teams. Her Indoor Championship in the 500 meters set a new National Record and narrowly missed the World Record at the time. During that period, Wilson was Nationally ranked in the 400 meter hurdles three times. After Nebraska she competed for the Los Angeles area South Bay Track Club where she set a Single Day All-Comers double, running 51.60 for 400m and 45 minutes later she finished the 800m in 2:02.60. The feat was accomplished at The Azusa Pacific Meet of Champions at Azusa, California in April 1996 and still stands as a North American record for a single day competition.

She set her Personal Record in the 400 meters of 51.02 during the semi-final of the 1996 Olympic Trials.

In 2000, Wilson was convicted of sending prescription medicine through the mail and was sentenced to a year in jail. She returned to competition and competed as late as 2005.
