= Li Baolian =

Chinese javelin thrower (born 1963)

Personal information
- Nationality: Chinese
- Born: 8 March 1963 (age 63) Yunnan Province, China

Sport
- Sport: Athletics
- Event: Javelin throw
Medal record
Women's athletics
Representing China
Asian Games
Gold medal – first place	1986 Seoul	Javelin throw
Asian Championships
Gold medal – first place	1987 Singapore	Javelin throw

Li Baolian (born 8 March 1963) is a Chinese athlete. She competed in the women's javelin throw at the 1988 Summer Olympics.
