= Emi Matsui =

Japanese javelin thrower (born 1963)

Personal information
- Nationality: Japanese
- Born: 20 February 1963 (age 63)
- Height: 158 cm (5 ft 2 in)
- Weight: 58 kg (128 lb)

Sport
- Sport: Athletics
- Event: Javelin
Medal record
Representing Japan
Asian Games
Gold medal – first place	1982 New Delhi	Javelin throw
Silver medal – second place	1986 Seoul	Javelin throw
Bronze medal – third place	1990 Beijing	Javelin throw
Asian Championships
Bronze medal – third place	1985 Jakarta	Javelin throw
Bronze medal – third place	1989 New Delhi	Javelin throw

Emi Matsui (松井 江美, Matsui Emi) (born 20 February 1963) is a former female track and field athlete who competed at two Olympic Games.

== Biography ==
Matsui finished second behind Fatima Whitbread in the javelin event at the 1983 WAAA Championships.

At the 1984 Olympic Games in Los Angeles, she represented Japan in the women's javelin throw and four years later at the 1988 Olympic Games in Seoul, she represented the Japanese Olympic team again.

== International competitions ==
Representing Japan
Year	Competition	Venue	Position	Notes
1982	Asian Games	New Delhi, India	1st	
1983	World Championships	Helsinki, Finland	17th	55.52 m
1984	Olympic Games	Los Angeles, United States	14th	57.72 m
1985	Asian Championships	Jakarta, Indonesia	3rd	
1986	Asian Games	Seoul, South Korea	2nd	
1988	Olympic Games	Seoul, South Korea	23rd	56.26 m
1989	Asian Championships	New Delhi, India	3rd	
1990	Asian Games	Beijing, China	3rd	
