= Zsuzsa Malovecz =

Hungarian javelin thrower

Zsuzsa Malovecz (born 21 May 1962 in Budapest) is a retired female javelin thrower from Hungary who represented her native country at the 1988 Summer Olympics. She set her personal best (67.18 metres) in 1988.

== Achievements ==
Year	Competition	Venue	Position	Notes
Representing Hungary
1988	Olympic Games	Seoul, South Korea	12th	54.58 m
1990	European Championships	Split, FR Yugoslavia	14th	58.48 m
