= Beate Koch =

East German javelin thrower

Personal information
- Nationality: German
- Born: 18 August 1967 (age 58) Jena, East Germany
- Height: 1.81 m (5 ft 11 in)
- Weight: 75 kg (165 lb)

Sport
- Country: East Germany
- Sport: Track and field
- Event: Javelin throw
- Club: TuS Jena

Achievements and titles
- Personal best: 70.76 m (1989)
Medal record
Women's athletics
Representing East Germany
Olympic Games
Bronze medal – third place	1988 Seoul	Javelin

Beate Koch (born 18 August 1967) is a retired German track and field athlete who competed in the javelin throw. She represented East Germany at the 1988 Summer Olympics held in Seoul, South Korea, where she won the bronze medal.

== International competitions ==
Year	Competition	Venue	Position	Notes
Representing East Germany
1988	Olympic Games	Seoul, South Korea	3rd	67.30 m
