= Diljeet Taylor =

American track and field coach (born 1977)

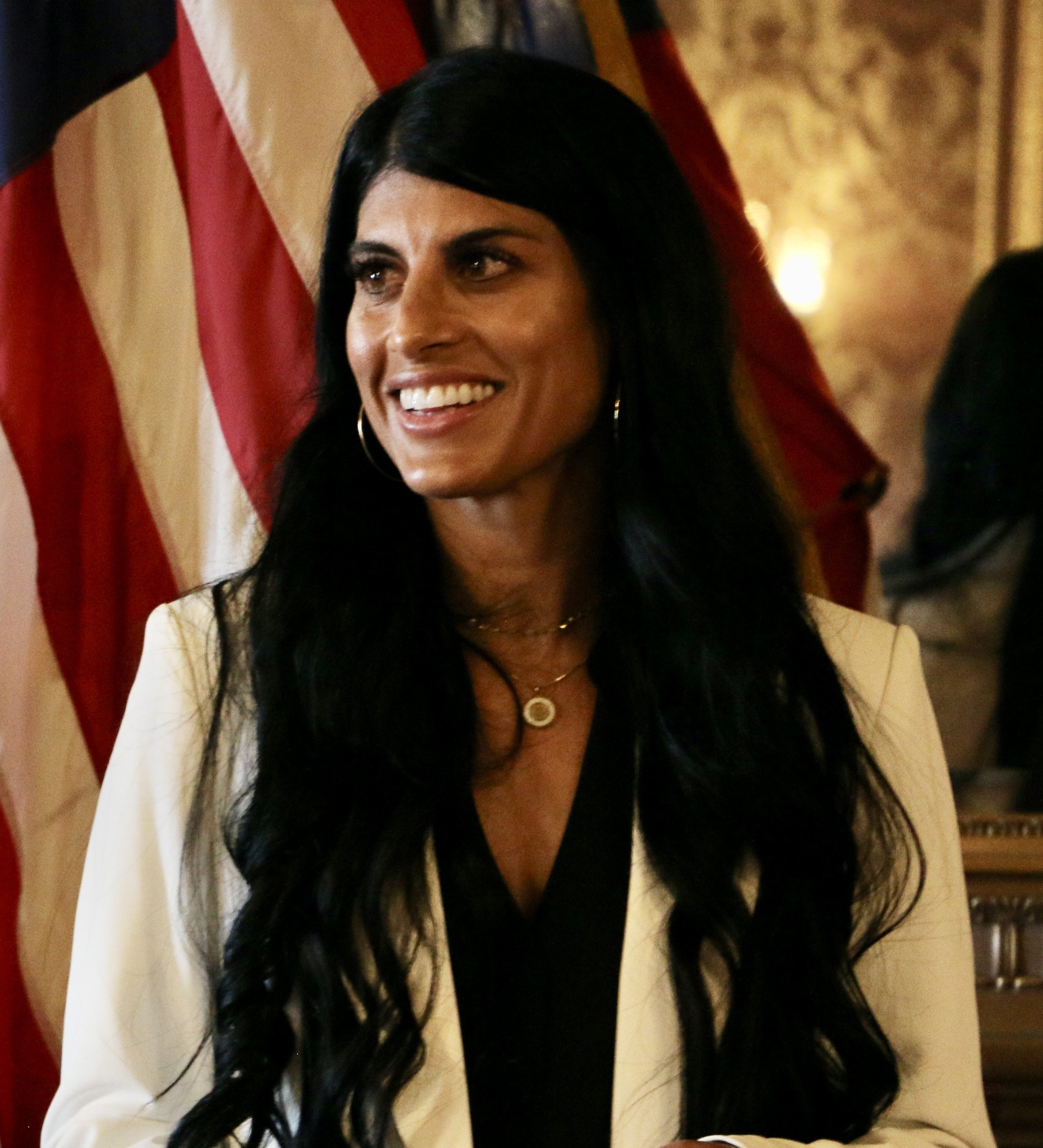
- Taylor meeting with Utah government officials in January 2022

Personal information
- Born: October 5, 1977 (age 49)

Sport
- Country: United States
- Sport: Athletics
- Event: 800 meters
- College team: Stanislaus State Warriors track and field
- Now coaching: BYU Cougars cross country, BYU Cougars track and field (women); Swoosh TC Provo

Achievements and titles
- Personal bests: 800 m: 2:07.76 (2004); 1500 m: 4:29.30 (2003); 3000 m: 10:25.05 (2002)

Diljeet Dosanjh Taylor (born October 5, 1977) is an American track and field coach and former runner. She is the head coach of the BYU Cougars track and field and cross country women's teams, which she coached to 2020 and 2024 national team titles. She also coaches a professional team for Nike.

Raised in California, Taylor was an NCAA Division II Women's Indoor Track and Field Championships runner-up in the 800 meters for the Stanislaus State Warriors track and field team. She coached at Menlo College and Stanislaus State before moving to Utah to coach BYU.

== Early life ==
Diljeet Dosanjh was born on October 5, 1977. She is a Sikh, and was one of four siblings. Her parents were from India, where they both ran competitively at the youth level. Her uncle competed in the 1964 Olympic decathlon. She grew up in a Punjabi-speaking household and only learned English after kindergarten.

She attended Ceres High School in Ceres, California, where she played tennis and ran track and field. She was 3rd in the 400 m at the 1994 Stanislaus County championships, running 62 seconds.

Taylor was encouraged to participate in high school sports, but due to Indian cultural pressure she was discouraged to compete beyond high school. She was recruited to run for the Stanislaus State Warriors track and field team, but instead took a three-year hiatus from the sport. She graduated high school in 1995 and first married in April 1996, working full-time as a bank employee.

Taylor eventually attended Stanislaus State and competed on their cross country team as a sophomore in 1999. On April 27, 2000, she was named the Turlock Journal athlete of the week for qualifying for the NCAA Division II Women's Outdoor Track and Field Championships in the 800 m. She was ranked 11th going into the championships but finished 6th in her semi-final and did not advance to the finals.

She earned her bachelor's degree in six semesters, graduating with a degree in liberal studies in the spring of 2000. Returning as a graduate student studying for a master's degree in education, Taylor placed 85th at the 2000 NCAA Division II cross country West regional qualifier.

At the 2001 Bill Cosby Invitational, Taylor set a school record of 2:20.47 in the indoor 800 meters, which she later improved to 2:16.05 Outdoors in 2001, Taylor was 3rd in 2:11.85 at the Stanford Invitational. She set a 2:10.82 800 m personal best and qualified for the NCAA championships, but did not advance to the finals.

Taylor was 67th at the 2001 NCAA Division II cross country West regional. Indoors in 2002, Taylor improved her school record to 2:14.46, 2:14.02, and then 2:13.37. She was named the CCAA's track and field athlete of the week for February 25 to March 3. She posted the 3rd-fastest semi-final time at the 2002 NCAA Division II Indoor Championships, improving her school record to 2:09.97. In the finals, she improved her record again to 2:08.94 to finish runner-up behind Katerina Glosová.

In her final season of eligibility, Taylor qualified for the 2002 outdoor Division II nationals in the 800 m, 1500 m, and 4 × 400 m relay. She won the 1500 meters at the 2002 California Collegiate Athletic Association conference championships and was runner-up in the 800 m. At the Division II national championships, Taylor finished 7th in the 800 m and 1500 m finals. She ended her collegiate career as a three-time NCAA Division II All-American and as her school's athlete of the year.

She remained at Stanislaus State as an administrative assistant after exhausting her athletic eligibility. Taylor continued to train with the team and competed in track unattached while also playing tennis at a club level.

== Coaching career ==
Taylor got her graduate's degree in 2004. From 2005 to 2007, Taylor coached for the Menlo Oaks track and field team in Atherton, California. She coached the women's team to a California Pacific Conference cross country title in 2006. She also competed as a professional for the Nike Farm Team in 2006 under the name Diljeet Dosanjh.

Taylor married Cal State Stanislaus basketball player Ira Taylor, who is a Mormon. Under the name Diljeet Taylor, she began working for Stanislaus State in 2007 as the head cross country coach. Taylor continued coaching as a new mother in 2010. She became the school's interim track and field coach in 2013, and was appointed as director of track and field and cross country in June 2013.

Taylor coached 3:52 mile runner Abraham Alvarado at Stanislaus. Also under Taylor, Courtney Anderson won a Division II national championship individually.

Taylor was offered an interview to coach the Brigham Young University team in 2016, which she accepted in order to visit family living in Utah. She didn't expect to get the job; as an athlete, she had once been kicked out of BYU's indoor track facility for wearing a sports bra while training.

Nonetheless, later that year, Taylor was named as women's assistant cross country and distance running coach for the BYU Cougars track and field team. While at BYU in 2019, Taylor coached the Mormon school's first out LGBT athlete Emma Gee, who she encouraged to be her 'best self'.

In 2019, Taylor was inducted into the Stanislaus State Warriors Hall of Fame 2020 class. She considered leaving BYU for a position to coach the Stanford Cardinal track and field team but chose to stay at BYU to support Meghan Hunter, who broke her neck in a car crash but was able to recover and win a Big 12 Conference championship over 800 m.

At the 2020 NCAA Division I cross country championships (held in March 2021 due to COVID-19), Taylor coached the BYU women to their first cross country national title since 2003.

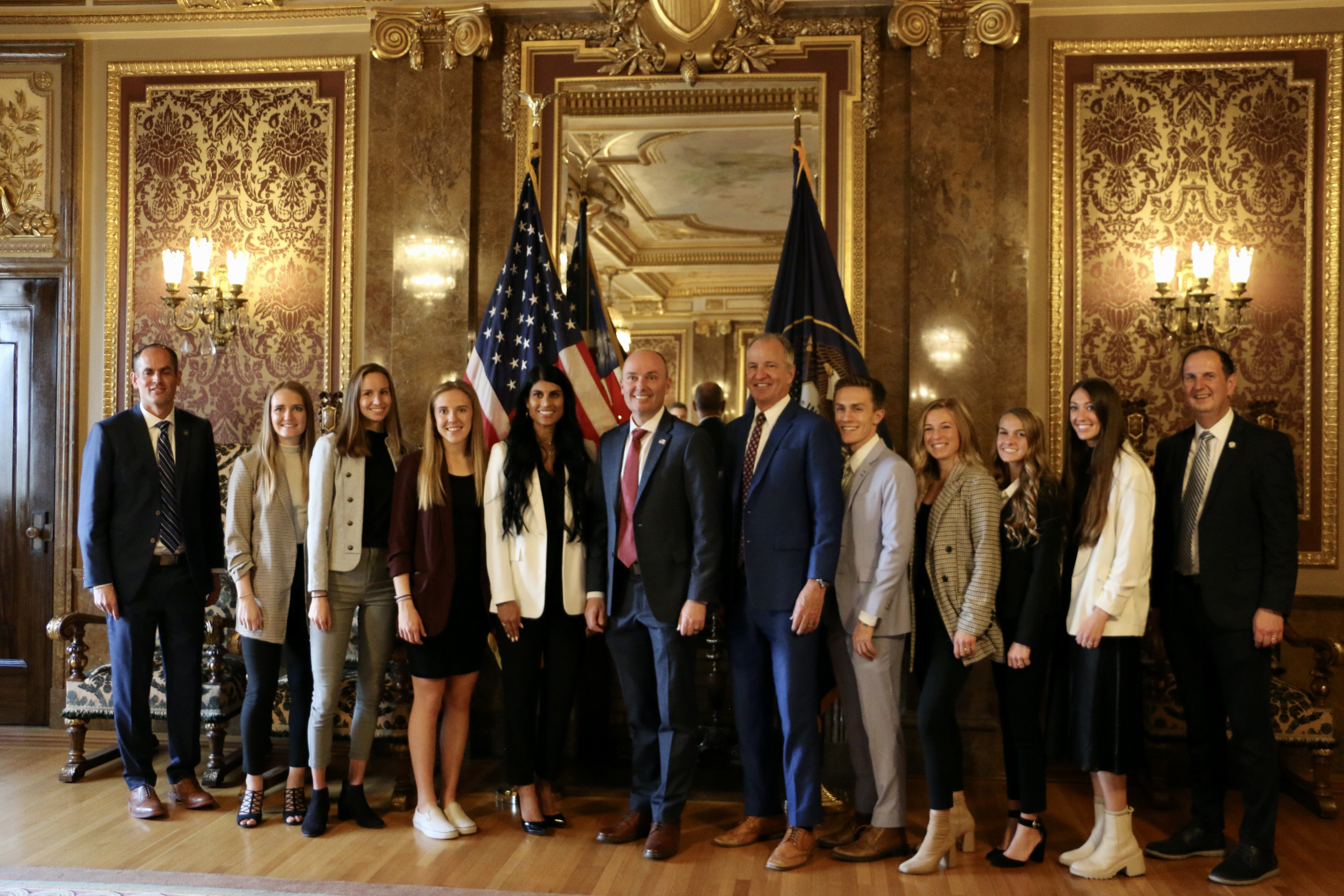
Taylor, Ed Eyestone, and various BYU Cougars track and field athletes meeting with Utah governor Spencer Cox in January 2022

Taylor was promoted to head BYU Cougars cross country coach in 2021. As a Sikh, she was believed to be the first head coach in at least 50 years at the school in any sport who was not a member of The Church of Jesus Christ of Latter-day Saints (LDS Church).

In 2022, Taylor announced the launch of a new professional running group based in Provo, Utah called Taylor Made Elite. The group consisted mainly of BYU runners who had turned professional, and she would continue to coach the BYU school teams alongside the pro group. The group was unaffiliated with any shoe sponsor. She launched a mobile app called Status Strong in 2023 for tracking mental health in athletes.

In June 2024, Taylor was a part of Nike Athlete Think Tank, a program to provide support to female athletes. She was in the third cohort of the program with Dawn Staley, Emma Hayes, and Jenny Lang Ping. In November, she led the BYU women to win the 2024 NCAA Division I cross country championships, her second national team title, alongside the men's team which also won under coach Ed Eyestone. Taylor published a book, Believe in Her: Why Girls Need Confidence and How to Cultivate It, in July 2024.

In February 2025, Taylor signed with Nike, Inc. to coach Swoosh Track Club Provo, a new professional team replacing Taylor Made Elite. She continued to coach at BYU alongside her pro team. She was selected to attend Faith Kipyegon's Breaking4 event as a track and field luminary. Taylor was named Utah Governor's 2025 State of Sport Awards Coach of the Year.

While at BYU, Taylor has been described as 'an outspoken feminist in Mormon country'. She said that she occupied a unique 'trifecta' of being a woman in a position of power, a minority, and not a member of the LDS Church, and that "some people on campus don't like me". She is known for both her personal style and individualistic coaching methods using positive reinforcement. She often uses metaphors in coaching and emphasizes positive thinking.

Due to her reputation, Taylor is able to earn money from paid speeches, allowing her to wear Louis Vuitton and Gucci clothing that she became known for. Her race outfits have become the subject of commentary, having once also worn custom pants with images of her athletes on them.

== Works ==
- Believe in Her: Why Girls Need Confidence and How to Cultivate It. Streamline Books. July 3, 2024. ISBN 979-8891651562.
