= Céline Chartrand =

Canadian javelin thrower (born 1962)

Personal information
- Born: 26 May 1962 (age 64) Laval, Quebec, Canada

Sport
- Sport: Athletics
- Event: Javelin throw

Céline Chartrand (born 26 May 1962) is a Canadian former athlete. She competed in the women's javelin throw at the 1988 Summer Olympics.
