= Athletics at the 1965 Summer Universiade – Women's javelin throw =

The women's javelin throw event at the 1965 Summer Universiade was held at the People's Stadium in Budapest on 25 August 1965.

== Results ==
Rank	Name	Nationality	Result	Notes
1st place, gold medalist(s)	Mihaela Peneş	Romania	59.22	
2nd place, silver medalist(s)	Michèle Demys	France	52.71	
3rd place, bronze medalist(s)	Valentina Popova	Soviet Union	52.66	
4	Angéla Németh	Hungary	52.66	
5	Sue Platt	Great Britain	50.24	
6	Nataša Urbančič	Yugoslavia	50.10	
7	Lucyna Krawcewicz	Poland	48.46	
8	Ágnes Radnai	Hungary	48.06	
9	Carter	Great Britain	46.82	
10	Annamaria Mazzacurati	Italy	46.42	
11	Daniela Jaworska	Poland	46.06	
12	Christa Sander	West Germany	45.14	
13	Maria Diaconescu	Romania	44.80	
14	Ute Bachmann	West Germany	41.02	
15	Inge Flachberger	Austria	40.14	
