= 1971 European Athletics Championships – Women's javelin throw =

Women's javelin throw at the European Athletics Championships

The women's javelin throw at the 1971 European Athletics Championships was held in Helsinki, Finland, at Helsinki Olympic Stadium on 12 and 13 August 1971.

== Medalists ==
Gold	Daniela Jaworska; Poland
Silver	Ameli Koloska; West Germany
Bronze	Ruth Fuchs; East Germany

== Results ==
=== Final ===
13 August

Rank	Name	Nationality	Result	Notes
1st place, gold medalist(s)	Daniela Jaworska	Poland	61.00	CR
2nd place, silver medalist(s)	Ameli Koloska	West Germany	59.40	
3rd place, bronze medalist(s)	Ruth Fuchs	East Germany	59.16	
4	Angéla Ránky	Hungary	57.44	
5	Anneliese Gerhards	West Germany	55.98	
6	Ewa Gryziecka	Poland	55.96	
7	Maria Kucserka	Hungary	55.70	
8	Márta Rudas	Hungary	55.62	
9	Nina Marakina	Soviet Union	55.34	
10	Nataša Urbančič	Yugoslavia	53.66	
11	Cecylia Bajer	Poland	50.50	
	Elvīra Ozoliņa	Soviet Union	NM	

=== Qualification ===
12 August

Rank	Name	Nationality	Result	Notes
1	Ameli Koloska	West Germany	58.44	Q
2	Ruth Fuchs	East Germany	56.60	Q
3	Nataša Urbančič	Yugoslavia	56.38	Q
4	Ewa Gryziecka	Poland	55.64	Q
5	Nina Marakina	Soviet Union	55.68	Q
6	Angéla Ránky	Hungary	55.44	Q
7	Daniela Jaworska	Poland	54.42	q
8	Cecylia Bajer	Poland	53.98	q
9	Anneliese Gerhards	West Germany	53.68	q
10	Elvīra Ozoliņa	Soviet Union	53.44	q
11	Márta Rudas	Hungary	53.18	q
12	Maria Kucserka	Hungary	52.90	q
13	Lyutviyan Mollova	Bulgaria	52.68	
14	Eva Janko	Austria	52.20	
15	Kirsti Launela	Finland	50.94	
16	Inger-Lise Fallo	Norway	46.78	
17	Svetlana Korolyova	Soviet Union	46.14	

== Participation ==
According to an unofficial count, 17 athletes from 10 countries participated in the event.

- Austria (1)
- Bulgaria (1)
- East Germany (1)
- Finland (1)
- Hungary (3)
- Norway (1)
- Poland (3)
- Soviet Union (3)
- West Germany (2)
- Yugoslavia (1)
