= Athletics at the 1970 Summer Universiade – Women's javelin throw =

The women's javelin throw event at the 1970 Summer Universiade was held at the Stadio Comunale in Turin with the final on 5 September 1970.

== Records ==
Standing records prior to the 1970 Summer Universiade
World record	Yelena Gorchakova (URS)	62.40	Tokyo, Japan	16 October 1964
Universiade record	Mihaela Peneș (ROM)	59.22	Budapest, Hungary	August 1965

== Results ==
Rank	Athlete	Nationality	Result	Notes
1st place, gold medalist(s)	Daniela Jaworska	Poland	56.16	
2nd place, silver medalist(s)	Magda Vidos	Hungary	50.60	
3rd place, bronze medalist(s)	Valentina Evert	Soviet Union	50.00	
4	Katalina Palfi	Hungary	49.56	
5	Iris Sporleder	West Germany	48.88	
6	Sherry Calvert	United States	48.16	
7	Arja Mustakallio	Finland	48.16	
8	Breda Babošek	Yugoslavia	47.10	
9	Lee Bok-soon	South Korea	46.64	
10	Inge Reiger	Austria	46.48	
11	Carol Martin	Canada	44.48	
12	Kyoko Kiyono	Japan	42.43	
13	Christa Peters	West Germany	40.46	
