= 1974 European Athletics Championships – Women's javelin throw =

Women's javelin throw at the European Athletics Championships

The women's javelin throw at the 1974 European Athletics Championships was held in Rome, Italy, at Stadio Olimpico on 2 and 3 September 1974.

== Medalists ==
Gold	Ruth Fuchs; East Germany
Silver	Jacqueline Todten; East Germany
Bronze	Nataša Urbančič; Yugoslavia

== Results ==
=== Final ===
3 September

Rank	Name	Nationality	Result	Notes
1st place, gold medalist(s)	Ruth Fuchs	East Germany	67.22	WR
2nd place, silver medalist(s)	Jacqueline Todten	East Germany	62.10	
3rd place, bronze medalist(s)	Nataša Urbančič	Yugoslavia	61.66	
4	Lyutviyan Mollova	Bulgaria	60.80	
5	Sabine Kärgel	East Germany	57.10	
6	Felicja Kinder	Poland	57.02	
7	Tatyana Zhigalova	Soviet Union	56.64	
8	Ameli Koloska	West Germany	56.36	
9	Eva Janko	Austria	55.16	
10	Éva Ráduly-Zörgő	Romania	54.44	
11	Daniela Jaworska	Poland	54.02	
12	Ioana Pecec	Romania	52.18	

=== Qualification ===
2 September

Rank	Name	Nationality	Result	Notes
1	Jacqueline Todten	East Germany	60.78	Q
2	Ruth Fuchs	East Germany	59.88	Q
3	Nataša Urbančič	Yugoslavia	59.72	Q
4	Lyutviyan Mollova	Bulgaria	57.70	Q
5	Daniela Jaworska	Poland	56.26	Q
6	Felicja Kinder	Poland	56.10	Q
7	Ioana Pecec	Romania	55.44	Q
8	Tatyana Zhigalova	Soviet Union	55.32	Q
9	Eva Janko	Austria	55.10	Q
10	Ameli Koloska	West Germany	54.62	Q
11	Sabine Kärgel	East Germany	54.02	Q
12	Éva Ráduly-Zörgő	Romania	53.98	q
13	Tessa Sanderson	Great Britain	53.28	
14	Svetlana Babich	Soviet Union	51.78	
15	Lida Kuys	Netherlands	49.42	
16	Giuliana Amici	Italy	48.72	
17	Mária Kucserka	Hungary	47.12	
18	Leentje Wuyts	Belgium	45.54	
19	Elly van Beuzekom	Netherlands	39.44	
	Zhuzhana Zhelyazkova	Bulgaria	DNS	

== Participation ==
According to an unofficial count, 19 athletes from 13 countries participated in the event.

- Austria (1)
- Belgium (1)
- Bulgaria (1)
- East Germany (3)
- Hungary (1)
- Italy (1)
- Netherlands (2)
- Poland (2)
- Romania (2)
- Soviet Union (2)
- Great Britain (1)
- West Germany (1)
- Yugoslavia (1)
