= 1969 European Athletics Championships – Women's javelin throw =

Women's javelin throw at the European Athletics Championships

The women's javelin throw at the 1969 European Athletics Championships was held in Athens, Greece, at Georgios Karaiskakis Stadium on 18 September 1969.

== Medalists ==
Gold	Angéla Ránky; Hungary
Silver	Magda Vidos; Hungary
Bronze	Valentina Evert; Soviet Union

== Results ==
=== Final ===
18 September

Rank	Name	Nationality	Result	Notes
1st place, gold medalist(s)	Angéla Ránky	Hungary	59.76	CR
2nd place, silver medalist(s)	Magda Vidos	Hungary	58.80	
3rd place, bronze medalist(s)	Valentina Evert	Soviet Union	56.56	
4	Nataša Urbančič	Yugoslavia	55.68	
5	Nina Marakina	Soviet Union	55.34	
6	Daniela Jaworska	Poland	55.16	
7	Marion Lüttge	East Germany	53.76	
8	Cecylia Bajer	Poland	50.54	
9	Vera Savinkova	Soviet Union	46.88	
10	Arja Mustakallio	Finland	40.80	

== Participation ==
According to an unofficial count, 10 athletes from 6 countries participated in the event.

- East Germany (1)
- Finland (1)
- Hungary (2)
- Poland (2)
- Soviet Union (3)
- Yugoslavia (1)
