= 1966 European Athletics Championships – Women's javelin throw =

Women's javelin throw at the European Athletics Championships

The women's javelin throw at the 1966 European Athletics Championships was held in Budapest, Hungary, at Népstadion on 2 and 3 September 1966.

== Medalists ==
Gold	Marion Lüttge; East Germany
Silver	Mihaela Peneș; Romania
Bronze	Valentina Popova; Soviet Union

== Results ==
=== Final ===
3 September

Rank	Name	Nationality	Result	Notes
1st place, gold medalist(s)	Marion Lüttge	East Germany	58.74	
2nd place, silver medalist(s)	Mihaela Peneș	Romania	56.94	
3rd place, bronze medalist(s)	Valentina Popova	Soviet Union	56.70	
4	Yelena Gorchakova	Soviet Union	55.96	
5	Elvīra Ozoliņa	Soviet Union	55.52	
6	Márta Rudas	Hungary	54.30	
7	Daniela Tarkowska	Poland	49.70	
8	Erika Strasser	Austria	49.26	
9	Gertrud Schönauer	Austria	48.56	
10	Eva Egger	Austria	48.54	
11	Ameli Koloska	West Germany	47.90	
	Nataša Urbančič	Yugoslavia	NM	

=== Qualification ===
2 September

Rank	Name	Nationality	Result	Notes
1	Marion Lüttge	East Germany	59.70	CR NR Q
2	Márta Rudas	Hungary	57.72	Q
3	Valentina Popova	Soviet Union	55.32	Q
4	Mihaela Peneș	Romania	55.02	Q
5	Ameli Koloska	West Germany	53.04	Q
6	Eva Egger	Austria	52.12	Q
7	Yelena Gorchakova	Soviet Union	52.08	Q
8	Elvīra Ozoliņa	Soviet Union	51.34	Q
9	Erika Strasser	Austria	50.68	Q
10	Daniela Tarkowska	Poland	50.58	Q
11	Gertrud Schönauer	Austria	50.52	Q
12	Nataša Urbančič	Yugoslavia	49.74	Q
13	Ágnes Radnai	Hungary	49.34	
14	Anneliese Gerhards	West Germany	49.26	
15	Angéla Ránky	Hungary	49.14	
16	Marilena Ciurea	Romania	46.82	

== Participation ==
According to an unofficial count, 16 athletes from 8 countries participated in the event.

- Austria (3)
- East Germany (1)
- Hungary (3)
- Poland (1)
- Romania (2)
- Soviet Union (3)
- West Germany (2)
- Yugoslavia (1)
