= Athletics at the 1972 Summer Olympics – Women's javelin throw =

Women's javelin throw at the Games of the XX Olympiad
- Venue: Olympic Stadium
- Dates: August 31 & September 1, 1972
- Competitors: 19 from 10 nations
- Winning distance: 63.88

Medalists
1st place, gold medalist(s)		Ruth Fuchs; East Germany
2nd place, silver medalist(s)		Jacqueline Todten; East Germany
3rd place, bronze medalist(s)		Kate Schmidt; United States

The women's javelin throw field event at the 1972 Olympic Games took place on August 31 & September 1. On 11 June 1972 Ewa Gryziecka from Poland broke the javelin throw world record with a throw of 62.70m only to have Ruth Fuchs break that record on the same day with a throw of 65.06m. In 1972 Fuchs was the strong favorite heading in the Olympics. Kate Schmidt took the early lead on the first throw, but this was soon passed by the favorite on the second throw. She ended up topping her own mark two more time in rounds four and five. Fuchs would go one and set the new javelin world record in 1973, 1974 and 1976.

== Records ==
Standing records prior to the 1972 Summer Olympics
World Record	Ruth Fuchs (GDR)	65.06 m	June 11, 1972	Potsdam, East Germany
Olympic record	Yelena Gorchakova (URS)	62.40 m	October 16, 1964	Tokyo, Japan
Broken records during the 1972 Summer Olympics
Olympic record	Ruth Fuchs (GDR)	63.88 m	September 1, 1972	Munich, West Germany

== Results ==
All throwers reaching 54.00 m (177 ft 2 in) and the top 12 including ties, advanced to the finals. Throwers in blue qualified by reaching the qualifying distance. Throwers listed in green qualified by being in the top 12. All distances are listed in metres.

=== Qualifying ===
Rank	Name	Nationality	Mark	1st throw	2nd throw	3rd throw
1	Ruth Fuchs	East Germany	60.88	x	60.88	p
2	Jacqueline Todten	East Germany	59.62	59.62	p	p
3	Kate Schmidt	United States	58.84	52.26	58.84	p
4	Nataša Urbančič	Yugoslavia	57.02	57.02	p	p
5	Mária Kucserka	Hungary	56.72	56.72	p	p
6	Lyutviyan Mollova	Bulgaria	56.30	56.30	p	p
7	Eva Janko	Austria	56.18	56.18	p	p
8	Svetlana Korolyova	Soviet Union	55.90	55.90	p	p
9	Anneliese Gerhards	West Germany	55.24	55.24	p	p
10	Éva Zörgő	Romania	54.34	54.34	p	p
11	Ewa Gryziecka	Poland	53.68	53.68	x	51.56
12	Magda Paulányi	Hungary	53.62	53.62	52.87	52.78
13	Angéla Németh	Hungary	53.48	53.48	x	51.40
14	Daniela Jaworska	Poland	52.40	44.68	52.40	50.16
15	Sherry Calvert	United States	51.38	x	51.38	51.00
16	Nina Marakina	Soviet Union	51.06	51.06	41.64	x
17	Marion Becker	Romania	50.74	x	48.70	50.74
18	Ameli Koloska	West Germany	48.42	48.42	x	x
19	Roberta Brown	United States	47.88	x	47.88	x
–	Rosa Molina	Chile	DNS			

=== Final ===
Rank	Name	Nationality	Mark	1st throw	2nd throw	3rd throw	4th throw	5th throw	6th throw
1st place, gold medalist(s)	Ruth Fuchs	East Germany	63.88; OR	57.44	60.20	50.20	61.16	63.88	59.16
2nd place, silver medalist(s)	Jacqueline Todten	East Germany	62.54	x	55.44	57.18	59.70	56.92	62.54
3rd place, bronze medalist(s)	Kate Schmidt	United States	59.94	59.94	58.32	59.84	x	48.80	56.10
4	Lyutviyan Mollova	Bulgaria	59.36	56.46	59.36	55.10	x	56.00	58.44
5	Nataša Urbančič	Yugoslavia	59.06	x	x	56.48	56.38	59.06	x
6	Eva Janko	Austria	58.56	x	58.50	x	x	58.56	52.06
7	Ewa Gryziecka	Poland	57.00	44.40	47.34	57.00	55.88	54.86	x
8	Svetlana Korolyova	Soviet Union	56.36	56.30	55.08	x	x	56.36	x
9	Anneliese Gerhards	West Germany	55.84	54.84	55.84	54.72			
10	Mária Kucserka	Hungary	54.40	x	x	54.40			
11	Magda Paulányi	Hungary	52.36	x	x	52.36			
–	Éva Zörgő	Romania	NM	x	x	x			

Key: OR = Olympic record; p = pass; x = fault; NM = no mark
