= Athletics at the 1968 Summer Olympics – Women's javelin throw =

Women's javelin throw at the Games of the XIX Olympiad
- Venue: Estadio Olímpico Universitario
- Dates: October 14, 1968
- Competitors: 16 from 11 nations
- Winning distance: 60.36

Medalists
1st place, gold medalist(s)		Angéla Németh	Hungary
2nd place, silver medalist(s)		Mihaela Peneş	Romania
3rd place, bronze medalist(s)		Eva Janko	Austria

The Women's Javelin Throw event at the 1968 Summer Olympics took place on October 14 at the Estadio Olímpico Universitario.

== Records ==
Prior to the competition, the existing World and Olympic records were as follows.

World record	Yelena Gorchakova (URS)	62.40 m	Tokyo, Japan	October 16, 1964
Olympic record	Yelena Gorchakova (URS)	62.40 m	Tokyo, Japan	October 16, 1964

== Competition format ==
The competition consisted of a single final round. Each athlete is allowed three throws, with the top eight athletes after that point being given three further attempts.

== Results ==
Rank	Athlete	Nationality	1	2	3	4	5	6	Result	Notes
1st place, gold medalist(s)	Angéla Németh	Hungary	57.66	60.36	55.56	57.54	X	53.30	60.36	
2nd place, silver medalist(s)	Mihaela Peneş	Romania	59.92	54.68	X	51.40	58.36	X	59.92	
3rd place, bronze medalist(s)	Eva Janko	Austria	54.60	X	X	46.44	46.24	58.04	58.04	
4	Márta Rudas	Hungary	56.38	X	X	51.60	X	52.68	56.38	
5	Daniela Jaworska	Poland	55.78	56.06	52.34	51.88	X	53.20	56.06	
6	Nataša Urbančič	Yugoslavia	53.80	X	55.42	X	X	–	55.42	
7	Ameli Koloska	West Germany	53.54	54.08	X	54.00	55.20	X	55.20	
8	Kaisa Launela	Finland	53.96	51.44	X	X	X	X	53.96	
9	Barbara Friedrich	United States	53.44	51.00	52.16	—N/a			53.44	
10	Lidiya Tsymosh	Soviet Union	X	X	53.40	—N/a			53.40	
11	RaNae Bair	United States	49.54	48.08	53.14	—N/a			53.14	
12	Lucyna Krawcewicz	Poland	51.54	X	X	—N/a			51.54	
13	Jay Dahlgren	Canada	51.34	51.10	48.04	—N/a			51.34	
14	Valentyna Evert	Soviet Union	X	51.16	X	—N/a			51.16	
15	Sue Platt	Great Britain	X	44.94	48.52	—N/a			48.52	
	Erika Strasser	Austria	X	X	X	—N/a			NM	
