= Ewa Gryziecka =

Polish javelin thrower (born 1948)

Personal information
- Full name: Ewa Gryziecka-Kwiecińska
- National team: Poland
- Born: 11 April 1948 (age 78) Katowice, Poland
- Updated on 7 February 2016

Ewa Gryziecka-Kwiecińska (born 11 April 1948) is a Polish former track and field athlete who competed in the javelin throw. She is a former world record holder in the event and represented Poland at the Summer Olympics and the European Athletics Championships. In her career, she was twice national champion and twice broke the Polish record.

== Biography ==
Born in Katowice, she moved to Gliwice and began competing for the local sports club, Piast Gliwice. She married Czesław Kwieciński, a Polish Olympic medallist in wrestling, and the pair had three children together, living in Gliwice.

Gryziecka's first major international medal came at the 1966 European Junior Games, where she was a bronze medalist. She began to make her impact at senior level in the early 1970s, placing runner-up at the national championships in 1970 and 1971 behind Poland's leading thrower of the time, Daniela Jaworska. She reached the top of the global seasonal rankings in the 1971 season with her throw of 62.10 m (203 ft 8 3/4 in) – a mark just 6 centimetres (2.4 in) farther than Jaworska, evidence of the Polish dominance of the period.

The best performance of her career came in 1972, shortly before the Olympics held in Munich. On 11 June, she had a throw of 62.70 m (205 ft 8 1/2 in) which added 30 centimetres (12 in) to the women's javelin throw world record of Soviet athlete Yelena Gorchakova, which had stood since the 1964 Summer Olympics. She briefly broke a 13 year long Soviet dynasty in the sport. In spite of the former record having lasted nearly eight years, Gryziecka's throw became among the shortest-lived throwing world records to have been set, as East Germany's Ruth Fuchs, who was competing that same day in Potsdam, went much farther with a throw of 65.06 m (213 ft 5 1/4 in) just 35 minutes later. These were the best performances of the year and Gryziecka ranked second to Fuchs on the seasonal rankings. She dropped out of the top ten rankings in subsequent seasons, with her last placing of note being ninth in 1975 with her best of 61.14 m (200 ft 7 in).

Gryziecka went on to be a two-time winner at the Polish Athletics Championships, being the national champion in the javelin in 1972 and 1975. She had two major senior international appearances in her career, placing sixth at the 1971 European Athletics Championships and seventh at the 1972 Summer Olympics. She was a gold medallist in the semi-final of her group at the 1975 European Cup. She continued competing until 1979.

== International competitions ==
Year	Competition	Venue	Position	Notes
1966	European Junior Games	Odessa, Soviet Union	3rd	48.14 m
1971	European Championships	Helsinki, Finland	6th	55.96 m
1972	Olympic Games	Munich, Germany	7th	57.00 m
1975	European Cup semi-final	London, United Kingdom	1st	59.28 m

== National titles ==
- Polish Athletics Championships
  - Javelin throw: 1972, 1975
