= Athletics at the 1961 Summer Universiade – Women's javelin throw =

The women's javelin throw event at the 1961 Summer Universiade was held at the Vasil Levski National Stadium in Sofia, Bulgaria, in September 1961.

== Results ==
Rank	Athlete	Nationality	Result	Notes
1st place, gold medalist(s)	Yelena Gorchakova	Soviet Union	51.39	
2nd place, silver medalist(s)	Maria Diaconescu	Romania	50.64	
3rd place, bronze medalist(s)	Almut Brömmel	West Germany	47.65	
4	Hannelore Wohlrab	West Germany	44.18	
5	Margarita Baltakova	Bulgaria	43.52	
6	Klára Kostanecká	Czechoslovakia	43.39	
7	Lucyna Krawcewicz	Poland	41.36	
8	Julia Benedová	Czechoslovakia	39.53	
9	Carla Spagolla	Italy	35.64	
