= Bojana Dornig =

Slovenian alpine skier (born 1960)

Bojana Dornig (born 7 August 1960 in Ljubljana) is a former Slovenian alpine skier who competed for Yugoslavia.

Dornig had two top-10 finishes in the FIS Alpine Ski World Cup, she finished 7th in Piancavallo and 9th in Bormio, Italy, both in December 1980. She was chosen as the Slovenian Sportswoman of the Year 1981.
