= Lidiya Tsymosh =

Ukrainian javelin thrower

Personal information
- Nationality: Ukrainian
- Born: 27 March 1942 (age 84) Lviv, Soviet Union

Sport
- Sport: Athletics
- Event: Javelin throw

Lidiya Tsymosh (born 27 March 1942) is a Ukrainian athlete. She competed in the women's javelin throw at the 1968 Summer Olympics, representing the Soviet Union.
