= Anna Maria Mazzacurati =

Italian javelin thrower

Personal information
- National team: Italy (13 caps from 1962 to 1969)
- Born: 12 February 1944 (age 82) Rome, Italy

Sport
- Sport: Athletics
- Event: Javelin throw
- Club: Cus Roma

Achievements and titles
- Personal best: Javelin throw: 46.86 m (1965)

Anna Maria Mazzacurati (born 12 February 1944) is a former Italian javelin thrower five-time national champion at senior level.

== Achievements ==
Year	Competition	Venue	Rank	Event	Measure	Notes
1965	European Cup (semifinal)	(East Germany) Leipzig	6th	Javelin throw	42.26 m	
1965	Universiade	(Hungary) Budapest	9th	Javelin throw	46.42 m	

== National titles ==
Mazzacurati won five national championships.

- Italian Athletics Championships
  - Javelin throw: 1963, 1966, 1967, 1968, 1969

== Personal bests ==
- Javelin throw: 46.86 m ( (Italy) Rome, 30 May 1965)
