= Slovenian Sportsperson of the Year =

Slovenian sports award

The Slovenian Sportsperson of the Year is an annual award presented by the Association of Slovenian Sports Journalists for the best sportsman and sportswoman of the previous year. The first awards ceremony was held in 1968.

== Winners ==
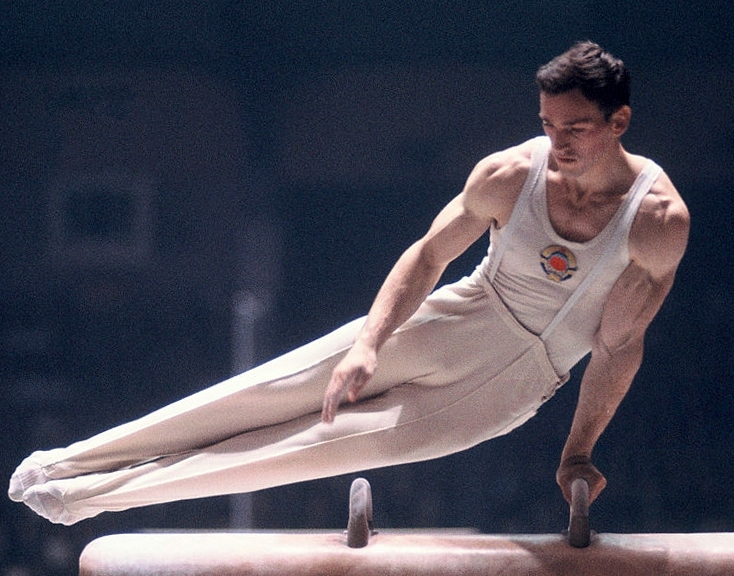
Miroslav Cerar, the two-time Olympic gold medalist, won the inaugural award in 1968.

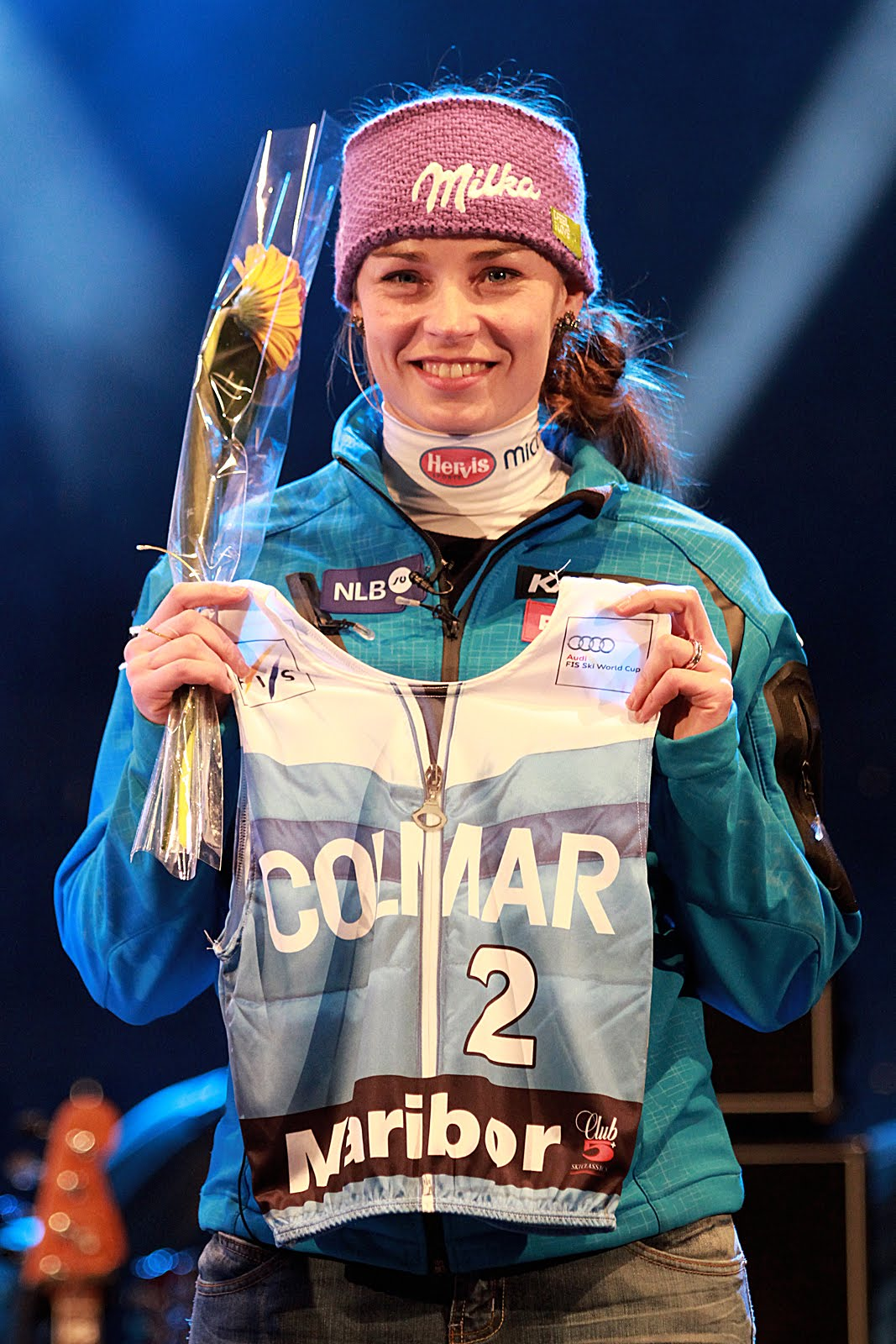
Tina Maze has won the award six times between 2005 and 2015.

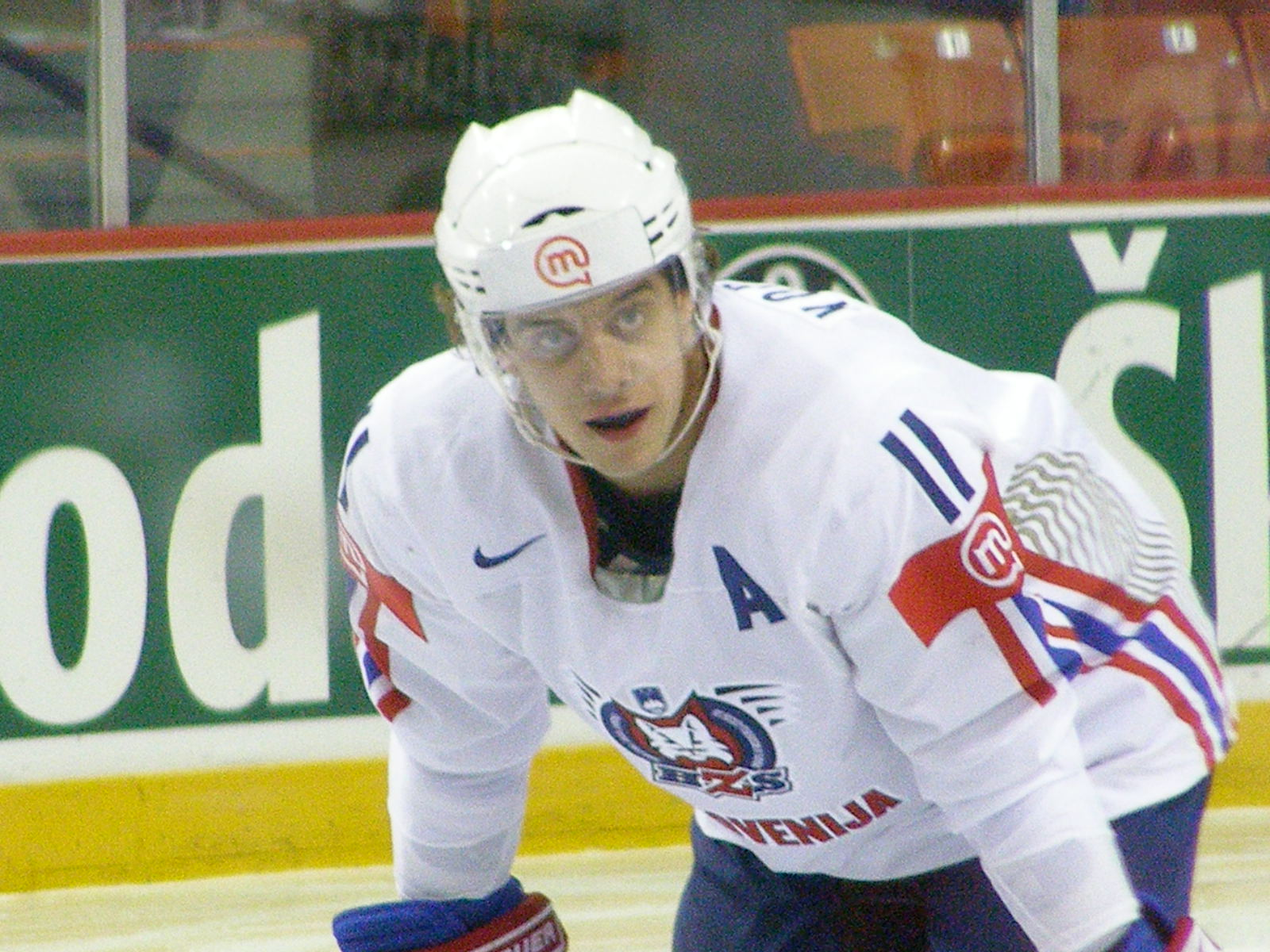
Anže Kopitar won the award in 2012. The two-time Stanley Cup champion played with the Slovenian ice hockey team at their first Winter Olympics appearance in 2014.

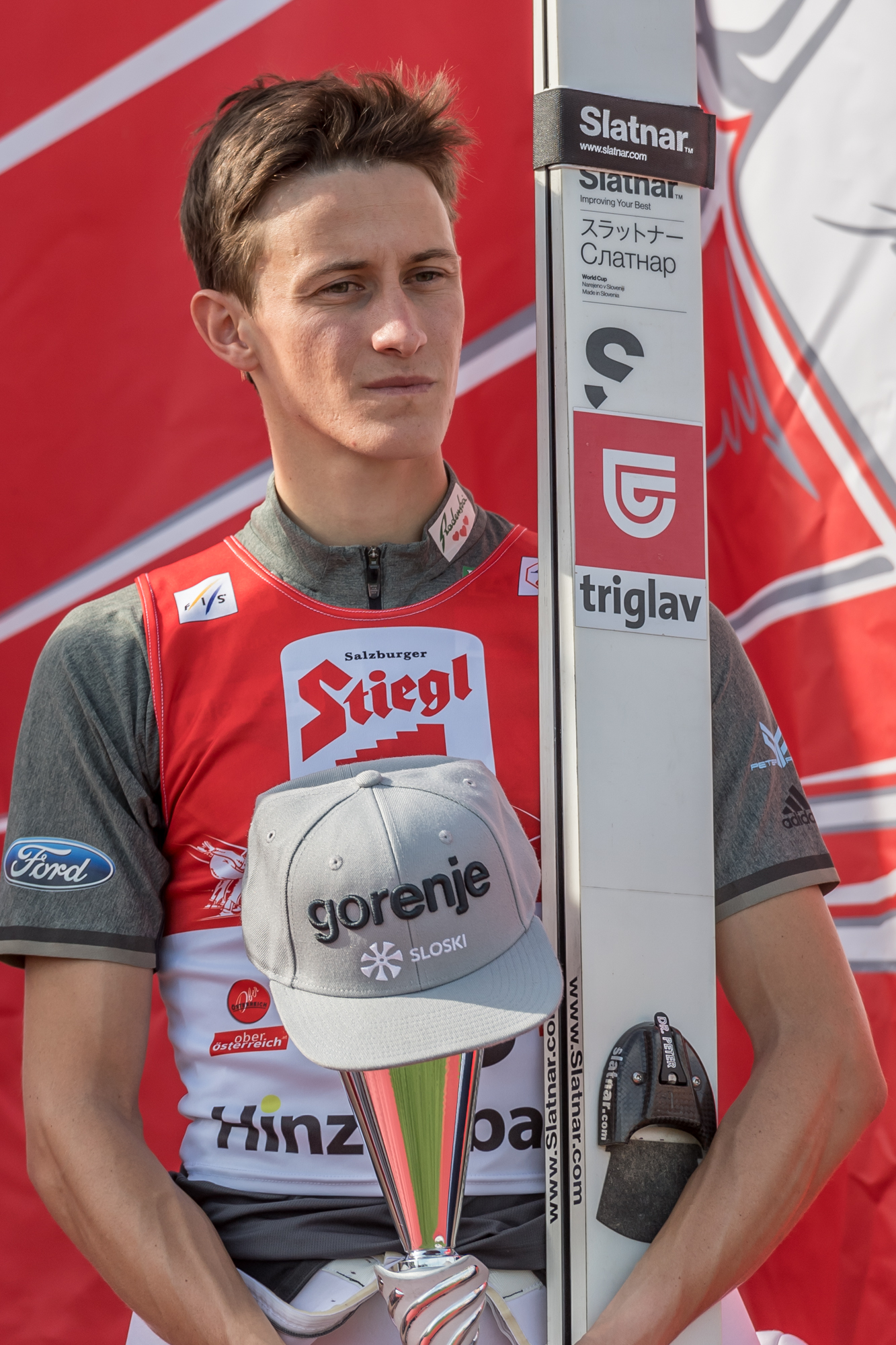
Ski jumper Peter Prevc has won four consecutive awards between 2013 and 2016.

Sport	Sportswoman	Year	Sportsman	Sport
Athletics	Marijana Lubej	1968	Miroslav Cerar	Artistic gymnastics
Athletics	Nataša Urbančič	1969	Ivo Daneu	Basketball
Athletics	Nataša Urbančič (2)	1970	Miroslav Cerar (2)	Artistic gymnastics
Athletics	Nataša Urbančič (3)	1971	Brane Oblak	Football
Athletics	Nataša Urbančič (4)	1972	Danilo Pudgar	Ski jumping
Athletics	Nataša Urbančič (5)	1973	Vinko Jelovac	Basketball
Athletics	Nataša Urbančič (6)	1974	Vinko Jelovac (2)	Basketball
Tennis	Mima Jaušovec	1975	Bojan Križaj	Alpine skiing
Tennis	Mima Jaušovec (2)	1976	Borut Petrič	Swimming
Tennis	Mima Jaušovec (3)	1977	Borut Petrič (2)	Swimming
Nine-pin bowling	Ljuba Tkalčič	1978	Borut Petrič (3)	Swimming
Athletics	Breda Lorenci	1979	Bojan Križaj (2)	Alpine skiing
Tennis	Mima Jaušovec (4)	1980	Bojan Križaj (3)	Alpine skiing
Alpine skiing	Bojana Dornig	1981	Borut Petrič (4)	Swimming
Alpine skiing	Andreja Leskovšek	1982	Bojan Križaj (4)	Alpine skiing
Athletics	Lidija Lapajne	1983	Borut Petrič (5)	Swimming
Alpine skiing	Mateja Svet	1984	Jure Franko	Alpine skiing
Alpine skiing	Mateja Svet (2)	1985	Rok Petrovič	Alpine skiing
Alpine skiing	Mateja Svet (3)	1986	Rok Petrovič (2)	Alpine skiing
Alpine skiing	Mateja Svet (4)	1987	Bojan Križaj (5)	Alpine skiing
Alpine skiing	Mateja Svet (5)	1988	Matjaž Debelak	Ski jumping
Alpine skiing	Mateja Svet (6)	1989	Andrej Jelenc	Whitewater slalom
Alpine skiing	Mateja Svet (7)	1990	Tomo Česen	Alpinism
Alpine skiing	Nataša Bokal	1991	Franci Petek	Ski jumping
Nine-pin bowling	Marika Kardinar	1992	Rajmond Debevec	Shooting sports
Athletics	Brigita Bukovec	1993	Igor Majcen	Swimming
Athletics	Britta Bilač	1994	Jure Košir	Alpine skiing
Athletics	Brigita Bukovec (2)	1995	Iztok Čop	Rowing
Athletics	Brigita Bukovec (3)	1996	Andraž Vehovar	Whitewater slalom
Athletics	Brigita Bukovec (4)	1997	Primož Peterka	Ski jumping
Athletics	Brigita Bukovec (5)	1998	Primož Peterka (2)	Ski jumping
Swimming	Metka Šparovec	1999	Gregor Cankar	Athletics
Alpine skiing	Špela Pretnar	2000	Rajmond Debevec (2)	Shooting sports
Athletics	Alenka Bikar	2001	Andrej Hauptman	Road bicycle racing
Athletics	Jolanda Čeplak	2002	Aljaž Pegan	Artistic gymnastics
Athletics	Jolanda Čeplak (2)	2003	Dejan Košir	Snowboarding
Athletics	Jolanda Čeplak (3)	2004	Vasilij Žbogar	Sailing
Alpine skiing	Tina Maze	2005	Mitja Petkovšek	Artistic gymnastics
Cross-country skiing	Petra Majdič	2006	Matic Osovnikar	Athletics
Cross-country skiing	Petra Majdič (2)	2007	Primož Kozmus	Athletics
Swimming	Sara Isakovič	2008	Primož Kozmus (2)	Athletics
Cross-country skiing	Petra Majdič (3)	2009	Primož Kozmus (3)	Athletics
Alpine skiing	Tina Maze (2)	2010	Dejan Zavec	Boxing
Alpine skiing	Tina Maze (3)	2011	Peter Kauzer	Whitewater slalom
Judo	Urška Žolnir	2012	Anže Kopitar	Ice hockey
Alpine skiing	Tina Maze (4)	2013	Peter Prevc	Ski jumping
Alpine skiing	Tina Maze (5)	2014	Peter Prevc (2)	Ski jumping
Alpine skiing	Tina Maze (6)	2015	Peter Prevc (3)	Ski jumping
Judo	Tina Trstenjak	2016	Peter Prevc (4)	Ski jumping
Alpine skiing	Ilka Štuhec	2017	Goran Dragić	Basketball
Sport climbing	Janja Garnbret	2018	Luka Dončić	Basketball
Sport climbing	Janja Garnbret (2)	2019	Primož Roglič	Road bicycle racing
Cross-country skiing	Anamarija Lampič	2020	Primož Roglič (2)	Road bicycle racing
Sport climbing	Janja Garnbret (3)	2021	Tadej Pogačar	Road bicycle racing
Ski jumping	Urša Bogataj	2022	Kristjan Čeh	Discus throw
Sport climbing	Janja Garnbret (4)	2023	Tadej Pogačar (2)	Road bicycle racing
Sport climbing	Janja Garnbret (5)	2024	Tadej Pogačar (3)	Road bicycle racing
Sport climbing	Janja Garnbret (6)	2025	Tadej Pogačar (4)	Road bicycle racing

== Multiple winners ==
Sportswoman	Wins
Mateja Svet	7 (1984, 1985, 1986, 1987, 1988, 1989, 1990)
Nataša Urbančič	6 (1969, 1970, 1971, 1972, 1973, 1974)
Tina Maze	6 (2005, 2010, 2011, 2013, 2014, 2015)
Janja Garnbret	6 (2018, 2019, 2021, 2023, 2024, 2025)
Brigita Bukovec	5 (1993, 1995, 1996, 1997, 1998)
Mima Jaušovec	4 (1975, 1976, 1977, 1980)
Jolanda Čeplak	3 (2002, 2003, 2004)
Petra Majdič	3 (2006, 2007, 2009)

Sportsman	Wins
Bojan Križaj	5 (1975, 1979, 1980, 1982, 1987)
Borut Petrič	5 (1976, 1977, 1978, 1981, 1983)
Peter Prevc	4 (2013, 2014, 2015, 2016)
Tadej Pogačar	4 (2021, 2023, 2024, 2025)
Primož Kozmus	3 (2007, 2008, 2009)
Miroslav Cerar	2 (1968, 1970)
Vinko Jelovac	2 (1973, 1974)
Rok Petrovič	2 (1985, 1986)
Rajmond Debevec	2 (1992, 2000)
Primož Peterka	2 (1997, 1998)
Primož Roglič	2 (2019, 2020)

== See also ==
- Slovenian Athletes Hall of Fame
