= Metka Sparavec =

Slovenian swimmer (born 1978)

Personal information
- Nationality: Slovenia
- Born: 9 December 1978 (age 47) Maribor, Slovenia, Yugoslavia
- Height: 181 cm (5 ft 11 in)
- Weight: 60 kg (132 lb)

Sport
- Sport: Swimming
- Strokes: Freestyle and backstroke
Medal record
European Championships (LC)
Bronze medal – third place	1999 Istanbul	50 m backstroke

Metka Sparavec (born 9 December 1978 in Maribor) is a retired female freestyle and backstroke swimmer from Slovenia. She represented her native country at the 1996 Summer Olympics in Atlanta, Georgia, where she did not reach the final in either of her two individual starts (50 m and 100 m freestyle).

Sparavec was named Slovenian Sportswoman of the year in 1999, after having claimed the bronze medal in the women's 50 m backstroke event at the 1999 European LC Championships in Istanbul.
