= Marika Kardinar =

Slovene bowler

Marika Kardinar (born 26 August 1953 in Dobrovnik) is a Slovenian nine-pin bowler and a coach.

Kardinar joined the bowling club Čarda from Murska Sobota in 1972. She became a member of the Slovenian team in 1981. During her competitive career, she won 40 medals at international competitions, including three individual and five team golds at the World Championships. She was chosen as the Slovenian Sportwoman of the Year in 1992.
