= Michèle Demys =

French javelin thrower

Personal information
- Born: 16 September 1943 (age 83) Orsay, France
- Height: 169 cm (5 ft 7 in)
- Weight: 60 kg (132 lb)

Sport
- Country: France
- Sport: Athletics (track and field)
- Event: Javelin throw
- Club: Stade Marseille Union Club
Medal record
Women's athletics
Representing France
Summer Universiade
Silver medal – second place	1965 Budapest	Javelin throw
Bronze medal – third place	1967 Tokyo	Javelin throw

Michèle Demys (born 16 September 1943 in Orsay) is a former French athlete, who specialised in the Javelin.

Demys won five French national javelin titles in 1962, 1963, 1964, 1965 and 1967.

She participated in the 1964 Olympic Games in Tokyo and placed tenth in the final.

== National titles ==
- French Athletics Championships, 5-time winner in the javelin:
  - 1962 French Athletics Championships
  - 1963 French Athletics Championships
  - 1964 French Athletics Championships
  - 1965 French Athletics Championships
  - 1967 French Athletics Championships

== Records ==
Personal records
Event	Performance	Location	Date
Javelin	52.88m		1964
