= Ljuba Tkalčič =

Slovenian bowler

Ljuba Tkalčič is a retired Slovenian nine-pin bowler from Maribor.

Tkalčič was the world champion in 1978 in doubles and in 1982 and 1996 at the team event. She was chosen as the Slovenian Sportswoman of the Year in 1978.
