= Tina Maze =

Slovenian alpine skier (born 1983)

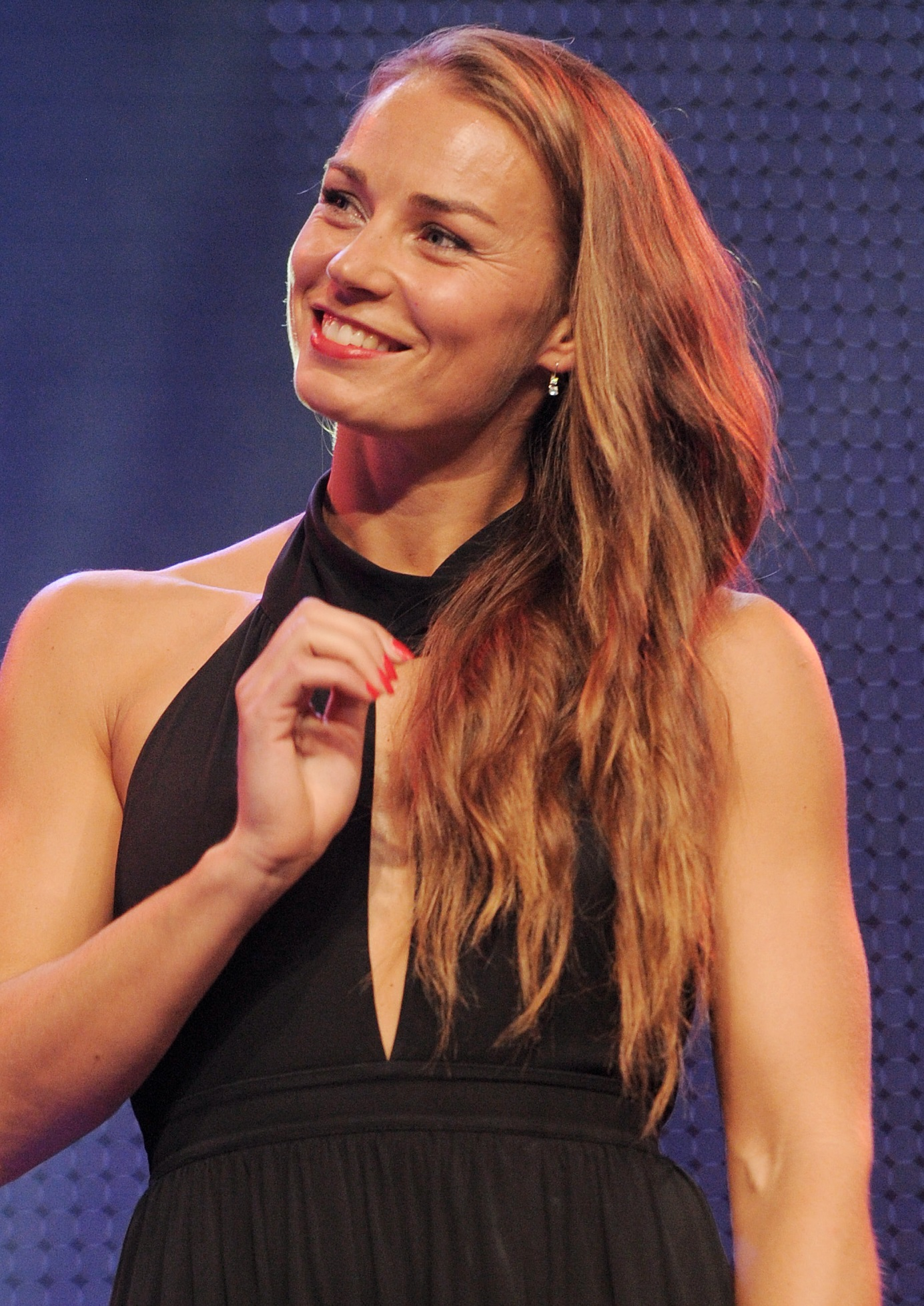
- Maze in 2014

Personal information
- Born: 2 May 1983 (age 43) Slovenj Gradec, SR Slovenia, Yugoslavia
- Height: 1.72 m (5 ft 8 in)
- Website: tina-maze.com

Skiing career
- Sport: Alpine skiing
- Club: CRN – SK Črna
- Retired: 7 January 2017 (age 33)
- Disciplines: Downhill, super-G, giant slalom, slalom, combined
- World Cup debut: 2 January 1999 (age 15)

Olympics
- Teams: 4 – (2002–14)
- Medals: 4 (2 gold)

World Championships
- Teams: 8 – (2001–15)
- Medals: 9 (4 gold)

World Cup
- Seasons: 17 – (1999–2015)
- Wins: 26
- Podiums: 81
- Overall titles: 1 – (2013)
- Discipline titles: 2 – (GS, SG in 2013)
Medal record
Women's alpine skiing
Representing Slovenia
World Cup race podiums
Event	1st	2nd	3rd
Slalom	4	5	8
Giant slalom	14	8	6
Downhill	4	4	3
Super-G	1	6	10
Combined	3	3	0
Parallel	0	2	0
Total	26	28	27
International competitions
Event	1st	2nd	3rd
Olympic Games	2	2	0
World Championships	4	5	0
Total	6	7	0
Olympic Games
Gold medal – first place	2014 Sochi	Downhill
Gold medal – first place	2014 Sochi	Giant slalom
Silver medal – second place	2010 Vancouver	Super-G
Silver medal – second place	2010 Vancouver	Giant slalom
World Championships
Gold medal – first place	2011 Garmisch-Partenkirchen	Giant slalom
Gold medal – first place	2013 Schladming	Super-G
Gold medal – first place	2015 Beaver Creek	Downhill
Gold medal – first place	2015 Beaver Creek	Combined
Silver medal – second place	2009 Val-d'Isère	Giant slalom
Silver medal – second place	2011 Garmisch-Partenkirchen	Combined
Silver medal – second place	2013 Schladming	Combined
Silver medal – second place	2013 Schladming	Giant slalom
Silver medal – second place	2015 Beaver Creek	Super-G

Tina Maze (Slovene: [ˈtiːna ˈmaːzɛ]; born 2 May 1983) is a retired Slovenian World Cup alpine ski racer. She is the most successful Slovenian ski racer in history with a career that culminated with two gold medals at the 2014 Winter Olympics. Maze was awarded the title of the Slovenian Sportswoman of the Year in 2005, 2010, 2011, 2013, 2014 and 2015, and with her four medals she is the most decorated Slovenian athlete at the Winter Olympics.

Maze started her career as a giant slalom specialist, but later competed in all five alpine skiing disciplines. She is one of seven female racers who has won in all five World Cup disciplines and one of three to do so in a single season. Maze is the 2014 Olympic champion in downhill and giant slalom and the 2015 world champion in downhill and combined. She was also the world champion in giant slalom in 2011 and super-G in 2013.

Maze won a total of 26 World Cup races during her career, and won the World Cup overall title in 2013. In that season, she won 11 races and tallied a record number of World Cup points – 2414, beating the previous record of Hermann Maier of 2000 points from the 2000 season. She also won the super-G and giant slalom titles, and finished first in the combined event (although no globe was awarded) and finished second in slalom and downhill. Maze also improved Maier's previous record of podium finishes in a single season (22) with 24 podiums.

== Career ==
=== Early years ===
Maze made her World Cup debut at age 15 in Slovenia in January 1999, in a giant slalom race at Maribor. During her early World Cup seasons, Maze competed in slalom, giant slalom, and super-G, but scored World Cup points only in the first two disciplines. At the 2001 World Championships, Maze's best result was a 16th place in slalom. In January 2002, Maze won her first podium, a second place in giant slalom in Maribor. At the 2002 Winter Olympics in the United States, Maze finished twelfth in the giant slalom in her Olympic debut at Park City, Utah.

=== 2003–2004 seasons ===
On 26 October 2002, Maze won her first World Cup race at the season opener in Sölden, Austria. She shared the giant slalom win with Nicole Hosp of Austria and Andrine Flemmen of Norway in the first-ever a three-way tie in a World Cup race. Maze finished the 2003 season on the 38th place in the overall standings with 190 points, all in giant slalom. At the 2003 World Championships, she finished 5th in giant slalom.

In the 2004 season, Maze scored one podium, a runner-up position in giant slalom, and finished 33rd in the overall standings with 244 points. She scored her first points in super-G and started competing in downhill races.

=== 2005–2008 seasons ===
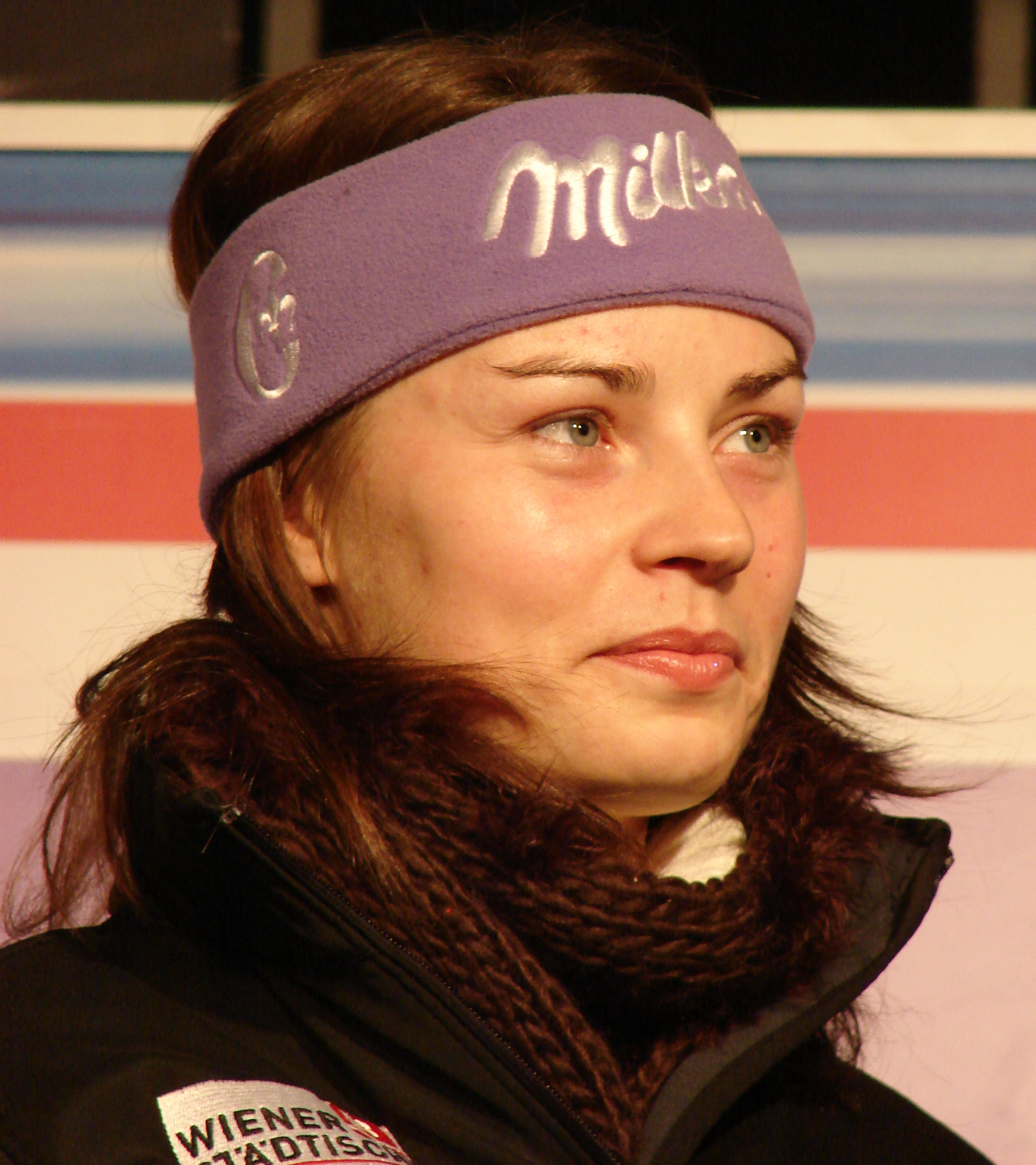
Maze in December 2006

The 2005 season was a successful season for Maze as she won 3 giant slalom races and scored two super-G podiums, both 3rd places. She finished the season 10th in the overall standings with 650 points: 366 in giant slalom, where she finished fourth. At the 2005 World Championships Maze finished sixth in super-G and 10th in the combined.

In the 2006 season, Maze won one giant slalom race and two more podiums, a third place in giant slalom and a runner-up position in super-G. She finished the season 14th in the overall standings with 525 points and scored World Cup points in all disciplines for the first time. At the 2006 Winter Olympics, Maze competed in the giant slalom and super-G events, where she finished 12th and 39th, respectively.

The 2007 season was not as successful for her as the previous two seasons, with only 3 top 10 finishes. She finished the season 30th in the overall standings with 268 points. At the 2007 World Championships, Maze's best result was a 14th place in super-G.

In February 2008, Maze won her first downhill in St. Moritz, Switzerland, which was the first downhill victory won by a Slovenian female skier. It was also her first non-giant slalom victory. She finished the 2008 season 28th overall with 287 points.

=== 2009–2010 seasons: The breakthrough ===
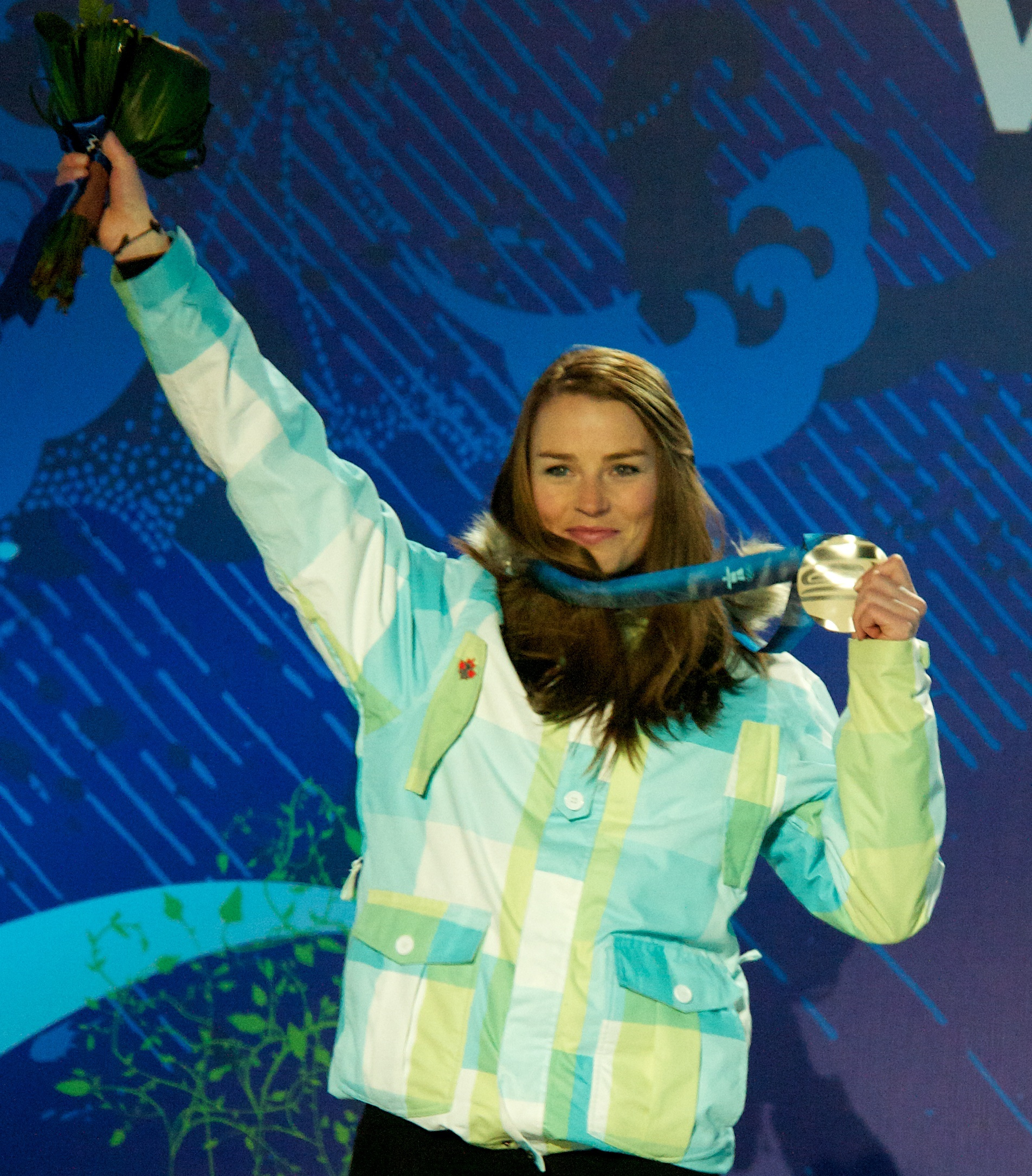
Maze with her silver medal at the 2010 Olympics

Following the declining results in the 2007 and 2008 seasons, Maze decided to break with the national ski team and founded her personal "Team to aMAZE" with her coach and partner Andrea Massi. This move turned out to be a decisive step in Maze's career as her results began to improve significantly. In the 2009 Alpine Skiing World Cup, Maze scored two wins, both in giant slalom, in Maribor, Slovenia, and in Åre, Sweden. She also won three more podiums, finishing second in downhill and was third twice in super-G. At the 2009 World Championships in Val-d'Isère, France, Maze won a silver medal in giant slalom, her first medal in a "big competition." In that race, she was only 15th after the first run but excelled in the second, "because she was angry." In addition to the silver medal, Maze finished 14th in the downhill and fifth in the super-G. Maze concluded the 2009 season sixth in the overall standings with 852 points, her best result to that date. She also finished third in the giant slalom standings.

In the 2010 season, Maze won one giant slalom race and had runner-up finishes in slalom and giant slalom. That season, Maze had fifteen top 10 results and finished fourth in the overall standings. Again, she finished third in the giant slalom standings.

Maze was the flag bearer for Slovenia at the opening ceremony of the 2010 Winter Olympic Games in Vancouver, British Columbia, Canada. She won two silver medals – in super-G and giant slalom at Whistler. These were the first silver medals at Winter Olympics for independent Slovenia (athletes only won bronze medals before 2010). Maze was fifth in the super combined, ninth in slalom, and 18th in downhill.

=== 2011–2012 seasons ===
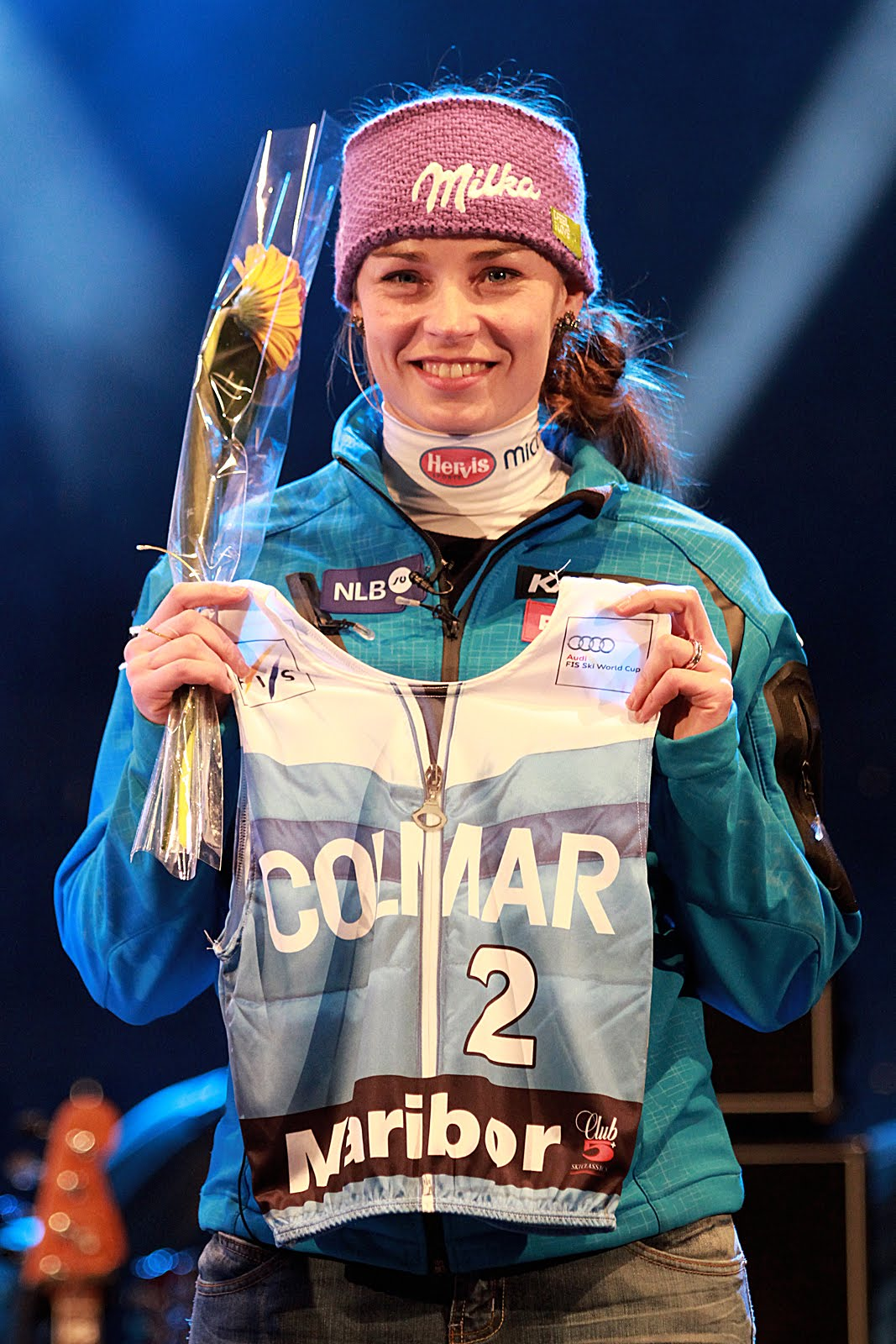
Maze in January 2011

Maze began the 2011 season strong with several good results and podiums. That season, she won the first races in her career in super combined (Tarvisio, Italy) and slalom (Lenzerheide, Switzerland). She finished on podium six more times. Maze finished the 2011 season third in the overall standings with 1139 points.

At the 2011 World Championships in Garmisch-Partenkirchen, Germany, Maze won the silver medal in the super combined and the gold medal in the giant slalom. She finished 5th in the slalom and downhill, and 11th in the super-G.

The 2012 season was a very interesting one as Maze had no victories but had ten podium finishes. She finished the season second in the overall standings with 1402 points, behind Lindsey Vonn of United States.

=== 2013: The record breaking season ===
Maze started the 2013 season with a win in giant slalom in Sölden, Austria. She then won the 2nd giant slalom in Aspen, United States, followed by two wins in St.Moritz, Switzerland, both in giant slalom and super combined. She then won again in giant slalom in Courchevel, France making it 4 wins out of the first 4 races in this discipline. She collected 11 podiums till the New Year, with five wins, two 2nd and four 3rd places, gaining a sizable lead in the overall standings. She also broke the records for most points in a calendar year (2,180) and most podiums (19) in a calendar year. Her first victory in super-G on 13 January 2013 in St. Anton made her a member of the small group of all-event winners in alpine skiing. On 26 January, Maze finished second in giant slalom in Maribor to clinch her first World Cup title in GS, then won the slalom the following day.

On 24 February, she won the second super combined of the season in Méribel, France, and secured the overall World Cup title with nine races remaining. Despite having the most points in super combined standings, the crystal globe for this discipline is no longer awarded due to a lack of events.

On 1 March, Maze finished second in super-G in Garmisch, her 19th podium of the season, breaking the previous ladies' record. The next day, she won the downhill to record a win in all disciplines in a single season, previously accomplished by only two female skiers. In this race, Maze also surpassed 2,000 World Cup points in a single season and therefore broke Hermann Maier's record from the 2000 season, which was exactly 2,000 points. The last downhill race of the season at the World Cup finals was cancelled, so Maze finished as runner-up in the downhill standings, a single point behind Lindsey Vonn, whose season had ended in February after a knee injury at the World Championships. The last super-G race was also cancelled and Maze won the super-G title. In the last race, a giant slalom on 17 March, she gained her eleventh victory of the season and finished with a record 2,414 points.

Maze broke various statistical records in this season. They include the highest number of podiums in a single season (24, record previously held by Hermann Maier (22) and by Hanni Wenzel and Pernilla Wiberg for ladies (18)), highest number of top 5 finishes (31, previously Hermann Maier and Pernilla Wiberg (24)), highest number of points after first 10 races (677, previously Katja Seizinger, 643), highest percent of possible points won (69%, previously 61% by Pernilla Wiberg), and the highest point difference to the second-placed skier (1313, compared to 743 for Hermann Maier and 578 for Lindsey Vonn). In fact, Maze collected more World Cup points than second and third skier combined. Maze finished on podium in all Giant slalom events of the season, a feature previously achieved only by Vreni Schneider in the 1989 season. She is also the only woman to remain at the top of the overall ranking throughout the season – a feature only achieved at men's Cup by Bode Miller. In addition to the overall title, Maze won the super-G and giant slalom titles, finished at the top of the combined list by winning both races in the season, and finished second in the downhill and slalom listing. The titles went to Lindsey Vonn and Mikaela Shiffrin, respectively. She also came extremely close to sweeping all 6 titles, losing the downhill title to Vonn by a mere 1 point with the seasons final race cancelled due to bad weather, and where Maze would have needed only a top 15 finish to pass the injured Vonn. Shiffrin needed to beat Maze in the seasons final slalom race to steal away the season slalom title from points leader Maze, and overcome an over second deficit on Maze after the first run to do so.

Maze came to the 2013 World Championships in Schladming, Austria, as a favorite. At the time, she was the leader in the World Cup standings in three of the five disciplines (giant slalom, super-G, and super combined), second in slalom and third in downhill. Several former alpine skiers stated that she is capable of winning a medal in every single discipline. In the first race at Planai, Maze won the gold medal in super-G and three days later won the silver medal in super combined. She then finished seventh in downhill, won another silver medal in giant slalom, and took fifth in slalom.

In October 2013, Maze was awarded the Skieur d'Or Award by members of the International Association of Ski Journalists for her record-breaking performances during the previous season, thereby becoming the first Slovenian skier to receive the honour since its inception in 1963.

=== 2014 season ===
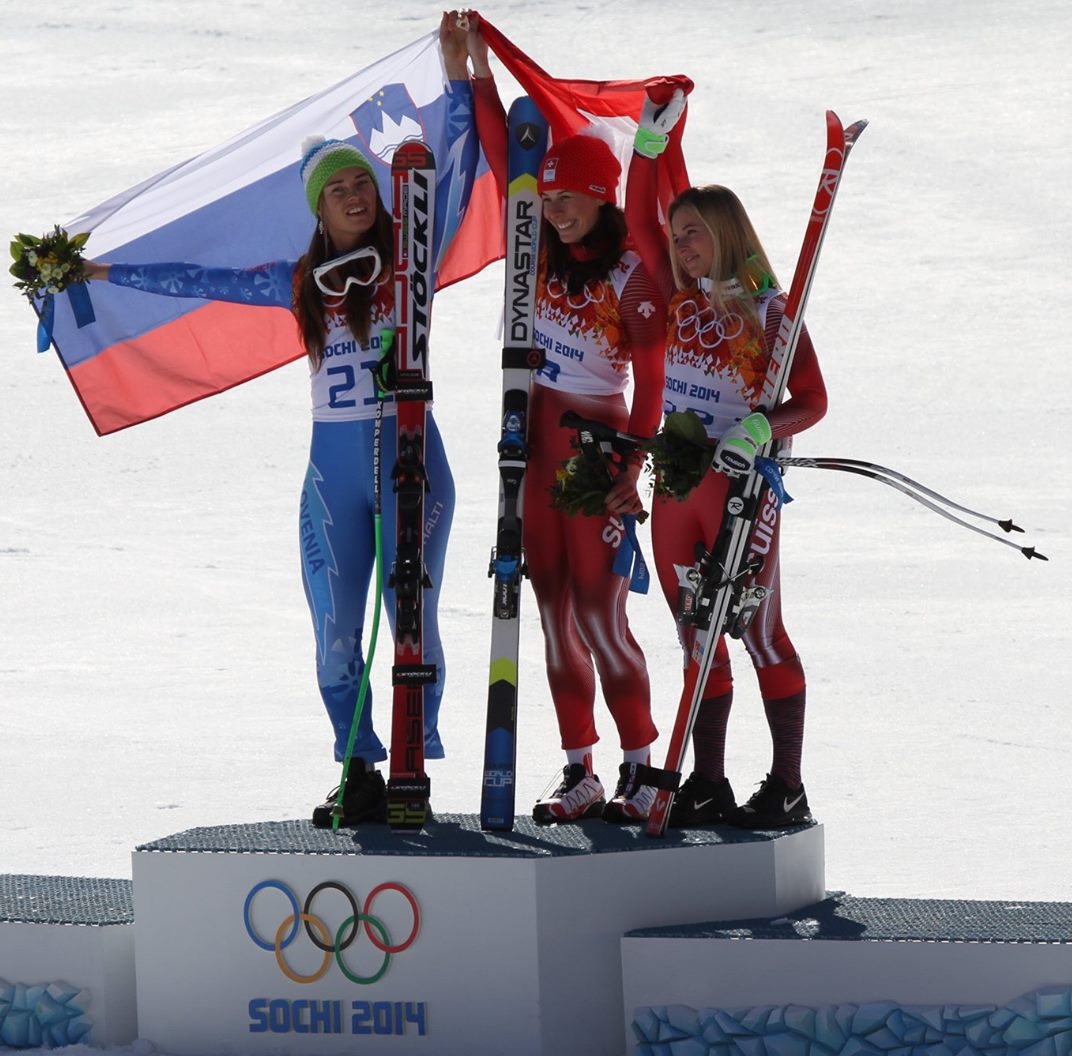
Maze (left) with Dominique Gisin and Lara Gut during the podium ceremony of the 2014 Olympic downhill

Maze started the 2014 season less successfully, with one victory and three more podiums before the Winter Olympics in February. The decline in results was partially attributed to the change of the coach from the previous season, when Walter Ronconi replaced Livio Magoni. In January 2014, Ronconi was replaced by Mauro Pini, who, according to Maze's team, brought a positive change to the team. Following the Olympics, Maze won two more podiums, two third places. At the end of the season, she was completely exhausted and finished the last races with difficulties, having fulfilled her goals with two Olympic gold medals. She won a third place in the downhill standings and finished 4th overall.

At the 2014 Winter Olympics in Sochi, Russia, Maze finished fourth in the super combined at Rosa Khutor. The second event was the downhill, where Maze tied for first place with Dominique Gisin of Switzerland. This was the first gold medal for Slovenia at any Winter Olympics and the first time that a gold medal was shared at an Olympic alpine skiing event. Maze finished fifth in super-G, won another gold in the giant slalom, and was eighth in the slalom. Following her Olympic success, Maze was nominated for the Laureus Award for the second year in a row.

=== 2015 season ===
Maze at a press conference before the start of the 2014/15 season

The start of the 2015 season was stronger than the previous year's for Maze. Winning three races and four additional podiums, Maze came to the 2015 World Championships in Vail / Beaver Creek, Colorado, United States, as the overall World Cup leader and was, as in 2013, seen as a potential candidate to win a medal in all five disciplines. She took silver in the super-G race, continued with winning gold both in downhill and super-combined and then finished 5th in giant slalom and 8th in slalom, what was her best overall performance at World Championships.

Following the World Championships, Maze was tired and did not finish any of the two races in Maribor, which meant that she started to lose advantage over Anna Fenninger. Final races of the season were a close battle between Maze and Fenninger. Maze won six more podiums until the end of the season and was leading 18 points in the overall standings before the last race but Fenninger won the last giant slalom and defended her overall title from the 2014 season. Maze finished the season second, with her second-highest number of season points. She also finished third in the slalom, super-G, and downhill standings. At the end of the season, Maze hinted that she may retire from competitive sport in the following months.

=== Retirement ===
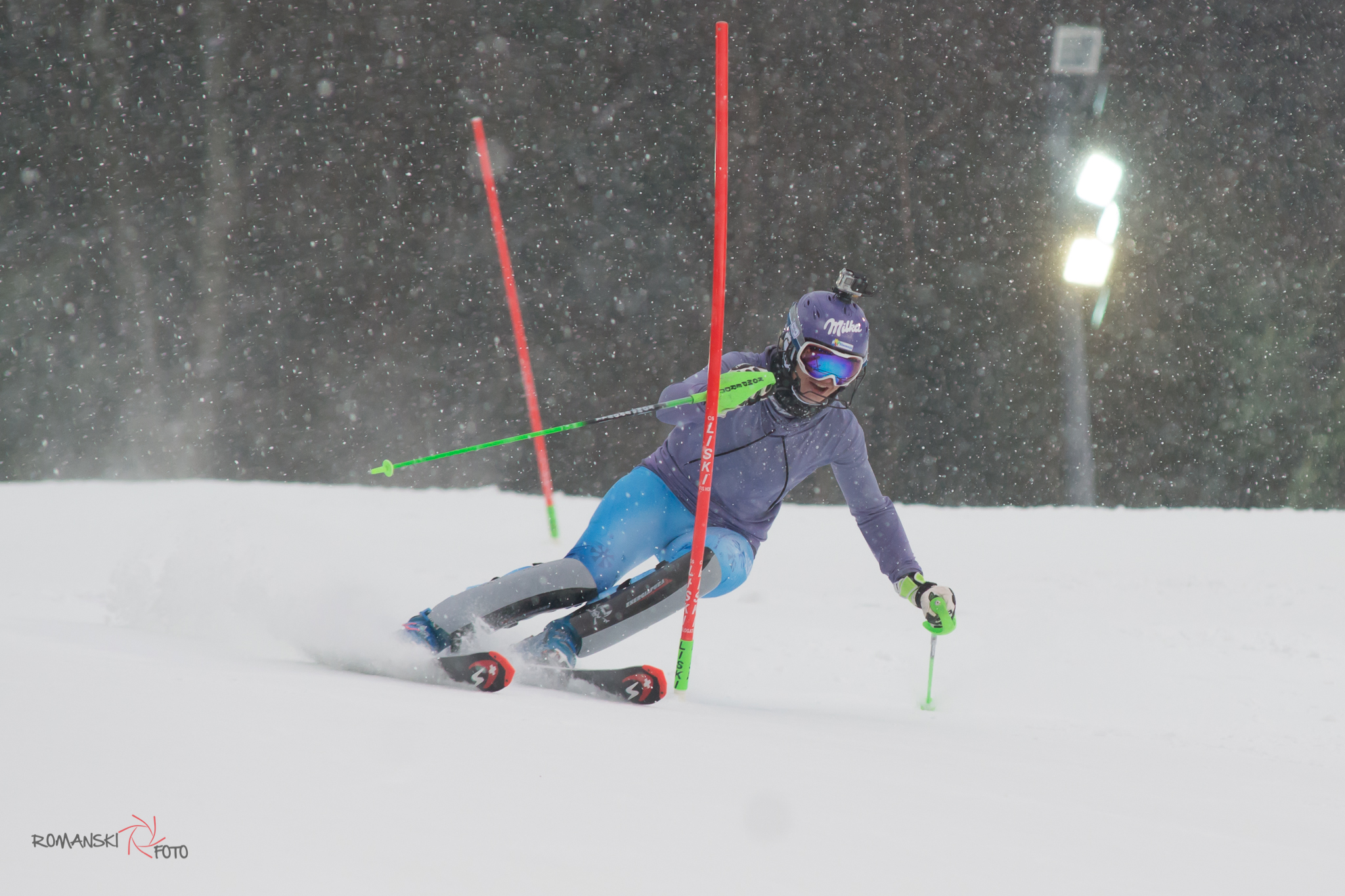
Maze in 2017, shortly before her retirement

In May 2015, Maze announced that she would take a break from the sport for a year, not competing in the 2015–16 season and focusing on her studies instead. On 20 October 2016 in Sölden, Maze announced her retirement from competitive skiing. She officially concluded her career on 7 January 2017 at the giant slalom race in Maribor, at the venue where she made her World Cup debut in 1999.

== World Cup results ==
=== Season titles ===
4 titles (1 overall, 1 giant slalom, 1 super-G, 1 super-combined)

Season	Discipline
2013	Overall
2013	Super-G
2013	Giant slalom
2013	Combined^{[A]}

=== Season standings ===
Place (points)

Season	Overall	Slalom	Giant slalom	Super-G	Downhill	Combined
2001	54 (109)	44 (16)	23 (93)	—	—	—
2002	36 (236)	44 (12)	8 (224)	—	—	—
2003	38 (190)	—	13 (190)	—	—	—
2004	33 (244)	—	8 (234)	47 (10)	—	—
2005	10 (650)	39 (17)	4 (366)	9 (236)	31 (31)	—
2006	14 (525)	46 (7)	7 (309)	13 (164)	37 (36)	32 (9)
2007	30 (268)	51 (7)	19 (81)	10 (143)	—	19 (37)
2008	28 (287)	—	30 (24)	19 (98)	18 (125)	17 (40)
2009	6 (852)	—	3 (368)	7 (202)	6 (256)	21 (26)
2010	4 (943)	6 (272)	3 (372)	8 (200)	25 (67)	14 (32)
2011	3 (1139)	7 (295)	6 (208)	18 (83)	8 (261)	2 (212)
2012	2 (1402)	3 (413)	5 (367)	4 (257)	9 (210)	2 (125)
2013	1 (2414)	2 (655)	1 (800)	1 (420)	2 (339)	1 (200)^{[A]}
2014	4 (964)	16 (148)	13 (184)	7 (183)	3 (409)	6 (40)
2015	2 (1531)	3 (439)	5 (266)	3 (390)	3 (356)	2 (80)

=== Race victories ===
- 26 wins – (4 DH, 1 SG, 14 GS, 4 SL, 3 SC)
- 81 podiums – (11 DH, 17 SG, 28 GS, 17 SL, 6 SC, 2 PSL)

Season	Date	Location	Discipline
2003	26 October 2002	Sölden, Austria	Giant slalom
2005	22 December 2004	St. Moritz, Switzerland	Giant slalom
2005	8 January 2005	Santa Caterina, Italy	Giant slalom
2005	22 January 2005	Maribor, Slovenia	Giant slalom
2006	22 October 2005	Sölden, Austria	Giant slalom
2008	2 February 2008	St. Moritz, Switzerland	Downhill
2009	10 January 2009	Maribor, Slovenia	Giant slalom
2009	14 March 2009	Åre, Sweden	Giant slalom
2010	11 March 2010	Garmisch-Partenkirchen, Germany	Giant slalom
2011	4 March 2011	Tarvisio, Italy	Super combined
2011	18 March 2011	Lenzerheide, Switzerland	Slalom
2013	27 October 2012	Sölden, Austria	Giant slalom
2013	24 November 2012	(United States) Aspen, USA	Giant slalom
2013	7 December 2012	St. Moritz, Switzerland	Super combined
2013	9 December 2012	St. Moritz, Switzerland	Giant slalom
2013	16 December 2012	Courchevel, France	Giant slalom
2013	13 January 2013	St. Anton, Austria	Super-G
2013	27 January 2013	Maribor, Slovenia	Slalom
2013	24 February 2013	Méribel, France	Super combined
2013	2 March 2013	Garmisch-Partenkirchen, Germany	Downhill
2013	10 March 2013	Ofterschwang, Germany	Slalom
2013	17 March 2013	Lenzerheide, Switzerland	Giant slalom
2014	25 January 2014	Cortina d'Ampezzo, Italy	Downhill
2015	15 November 2014	Levi, Finland	Slalom
2015	5 December 2014	Lake Louise, Canada	Downhill
2015	12 December 2014	Åre, Sweden	Giant slalom

== Olympic results ==
Year	Age	Slalom	Giant slalom	Super-G	Downhill	Combined
2002	18	—	12	—	—	—
2006	22	—	12	39	—	—
2010	26	9	2	2	18	5
2014	30	8	1	5	1	4

== World Championship results ==
Year	Age	Slalom	Giant slalom	Super-G	Downhill	Combined
2001	17	16	22	32	—	—
2003	19	DNF1	5	—	—	—
2005	21	DNF2	DNF1	6	—	10
2007	23	DNF1	22	14	—	DNF2
2009	25	—	2	5	14	DNF2
2011	27	5	1	11	5	2
2013	29	5	2	1	7	2
2015	31	8	5	2	1	1

== Personal life ==
When not competing or training abroad, Maze lives in Črna na Koroškem. She is in a relationship with Andrea Massi, who is also the head of Maze's team. In November 2017, they announced they were expecting a child together. She gave birth to a girl in February 2018.

In 2012, Maze recorded a pop-rock single "My Way Is My Decision", produced by Raay.

During the year-long break from competing, Maze concluded her studies at the Faculty of Education, University of Maribor, obtaining an elementary school teacher degree.

== Awards ==
Year	Category	Voted by	Result
2005	Slovenian Sportswoman of the Year	Slovene sports journalists association	Won
2010	Slovenian Sportswoman of the Year	Slovene sports journalists association	Won
2011	Slovenian Sportswoman of the Year	Slovene sports journalists association	Won
2012	Prince of Asturias Awards	Sports category	Nominated
2013	Sportswoman of the Year	Women's Sports Foundation	Nominated
2013	Serge Lang Trophy – Skier of the Year	International Association of Ski Journalists	Won
2013	Slovenian Sportswoman of the Year	Slovene sports journalists association	Won
2013	World Athlete of the Year	Chicago Tribune's 27th annual international sports award	2nd
2013	European Athlete of the Year	European Press Agencies led by PAP; women's category	Won
2014	2013 AIPS European Female Athlete of the Year	International Sports Press Association	2nd
2014	Laureus World Sports Award for Sportswoman of the Year	Various World Media journalists	Nominated
2014	Slovenian Sportswoman of the Year	Slovene sports journalists association	Won
2014	World Sportswoman of the Year	Gazzetta dello Sport readership	Won
2015	Slovenian Sportswoman of the Year	Slovene sports journalists association	Won
2015	L'Équipe Champion of Champions	L'Équipe readership	5th

- ^{A} Crystal globes in combined have not been officially awarded for 2013 season. However, athletes still get their medals.

Olympic Games
Preceded by Tadeja Brankovič-Likozar	Flagbearer for Slovenia; Vancouver 2010	Succeeded by Tomaž Razingar
