= Jacqueline Todten =

East German athlete (born 1954)

Personal information
- Born: Jacqueline Hein; 29 May 1954 (age 72) East Berlin, East Germany
- Height: 1.71 m (5 ft 7 in)
- Weight: 62 kg (137 lb)

Sport
- Country: East Germany
- Sport: athletics
- Event: Javelin throw
- Club: SC Dynamo Berlin
- Coached by: Hans Beer

Achievements and titles
- Personal best: 64.34 m (1974)
Medal record
Women's athletics
Representing East Germany
Olympic Games
Silver medal – second place	1972 Munich	Javelin
European Championships
Silver medal – second place	1974 Rome	Javelin

Jacqueline Todten (born 29 May 1954 in Berlin) is an East German athlete who competed mainly in the Javelin, who competed for the SC Dynamo Berlin / Sportvereinigung (SV) Dynamo.

She competed for East Germany in the 1972 Summer Olympics held in Munich, Germany in the Javelin where she won the Silver medal finishing behind teammate Ruth Fuchs.
