= Athletics at the 1967 Summer Universiade – Women's javelin throw =

Javelin throw event

The women's javelin throw event at the 1967 Summer Universiade was held at the National Olympic Stadium in Tokyo on 1 September 1967. There were only four participants.

== Results ==
Rank	Name	Nationality	Result	Notes
1st place, gold medalist(s)	RaNae Bair	United States	52.98	
2nd place, silver medalist(s)	Sakiko Hara	Japan	48.38	
3rd place, bronze medalist(s)	Michèle Demys	France	48.20	
4	Tamako Yamauchi	Japan	41.68	
