= Magda Paulányi =

Hungarian javelin thrower (1945–2024)

Personal information
- Full name: Magdolna Paulányi
- Nationality: Hungarian
- Born: 19 June 1945 Budapest, Hungary
- Died: 14 January 2024 (aged 78) Székesfehérvar, Hungary

Sport
- Sport: Athletics
- Event: Javelin throw
Medal record
Women's athletics
Representing Hungary
European Championships
Silver medal – second place	1969 Athens	Javelin throw
Summer Universiade
Silver medal – second place	1970 Turin	Javelin throw

Magdolna "Magda" Paulányi, née Vidos, (19 June 1945 – 14 January 2024) was a Hungarian athlete. She competed in the women's javelin throw at the 1972 Summer Olympics. Paulányi died on 14 January 2024, at the age of 78.
