= Daniela Jaworska =

Polish javelin thrower (born 1946)

Personal information
- Nationality: Polish
- Born: Daniela Tarkowska; 4 January 1946 (age 80) Wyborów, Poland
- Height: 1.64 m (5 ft 5 in)
- Weight: 63 kg (139 lb)

Sport
- Event: Long jump
Medal record
Women's athletics
Representing Poland
European Championships
Gold medal – first place	1971 Stockholm	Javelin throw
Universiade
Gold medal – first place	1970 Turin	Javelin throw

Daniela Jaworska (née Tarkowska; born 4 January 1946 in Wyborów, Łódzkie) is a retired javelin thrower from Poland, who represented her native country twice at the Summer Olympics: 1968 and 1972. She set her personal best (62.30 metres) in 1973.

== Achievements ==
Year	Competition	Venue	Position	Notes
Representing Poland
1964	European Junior Games	Warsaw, Poland	9th	42.61 m
1965	Universiade	Budapest, Hungary	10th	46.06 m
1966	European Championships	Budapest, Hungary	7th	49.70 m
1968	Olympic Games	Mexico City, Mexico	5th	56.06 m
1969	European Championships	Athens, Greece	6th	55.16 m
1970	Universiade	Turin, Italy	1st	56.16 m
1971	European Championships	Helsinki, Finland	1st	61.00 m
1972	Olympic Games	Munich, West Germany	14th (q)	52.40 m
