= Valentyna Evert =

Ukrainian javelin thrower

Personal information
- Nationality: Ukrainian
- Born: 8 March 1946 (age 80) Kharkiv, Ukrainian SSR, Soviet Union

Sport
- Sport: Athletics
- Event: Javelin throw
Medal record
Women's athletics
Representing Soviet Union
European Championships
Bronze medal – third place	1969 Athens	Javelin throw
Summer Universiade
Bronze medal – third place	1970 Turin	Javelin throw

Valentyna Evert (Ukrainian: Валентина Еверт), née Valentyna Borisevich, (8 March 1946) is a Ukrainian athlete. She competed in the women's javelin throw at the 1968 Summer Olympics, representing the Soviet Union.
