= Marion Lüttge =

East German javelin thrower

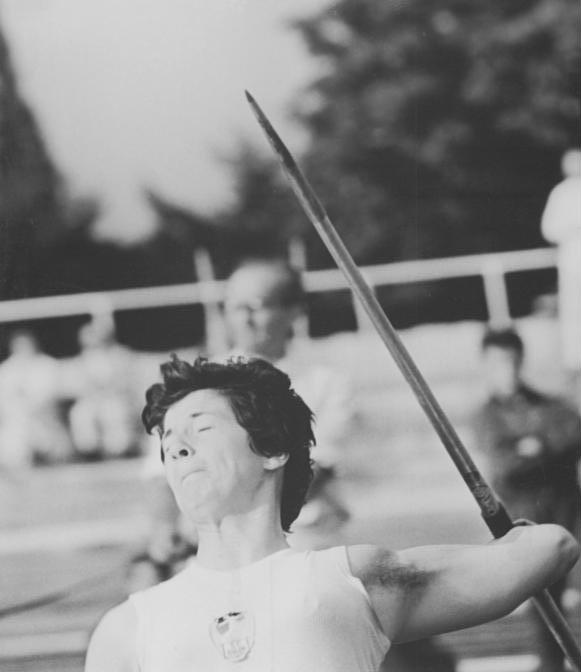
- Marion Lüttge in 1963

Personal information
- Full name: Marion Lüttge
- Nationality: German
- Born: Marion Gräfe; 25 November 1941 (age 84) Leipzig, Germany

Sport
- Country: East Germany
- Sport: Athletics
- Event: Javelin throw

Achievements and titles
- Personal best: 59.70 m (1966)
Medal record
Women's athletics
Representing East Germany
European Championships
Gold medal – first place	1966 Budapest	Javelin throw

Marion Lüttge, née Gräfe (25 November 1941) is a former East German javelin thrower. Lüttge won the gold medal at the 1966 European Championships in Budapest.

== Biography ==
Lüttge was born in Leipzig, Saxony and had worked as a chemist before devoting herself to athletics. In 1963, she married the hammer thrower Friedrich Lüttge, the brother of shot putter Johanna Lüttge.

Lüttge was the East German champion in the javelin in 1962, 1963 and 1966. She also established three national records during her career; she recorded the last of these on 2 September 1966 with a personal best throw of 59.70m during qualification for the final of the 1966 European Championships.
