= Mihaela Peneș =

Romanian javelin thrower (1947–2024)

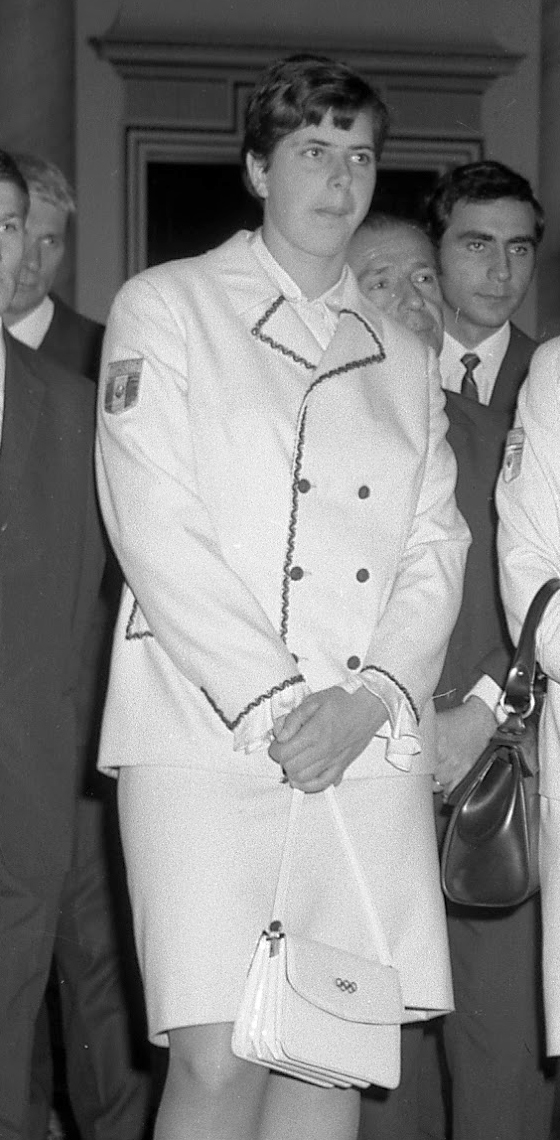
- Peneș in 1968

Personal information
- Born: 22 July 1947 Bucharest, Romania
- Died: 29 August 2024 (aged 77)
- Height: 1.88 m (6 ft 2 in)
- Weight: 94 kg (207 lb)

Sport
- Sport: Athletics
- Event: Javelin throw
- Club: Dinamo Bucharest
- Coached by: Ioan Benga; Titus Tatu

Achievements and titles
- Personal best: 60.68 m (1967)
Medal record
Women's athletics
Representing Romania
Olympic Games
Gold medal – first place	1964 Tokyo	Javelin throw
Silver medal – second place	1968 Mexico City	Javelin throw
European Championships
Silver medal – second place	1966 Budapest	Javelin throw
Universiade
Gold medal – first place	1965 Budapest	Javelin throw

Mihaela Peneș (22 July 1947 – 29 August 2024) was a Romanian javelin thrower. She competed at the 1964 and 1968 Olympics and won a gold and a silver medal, respectively.

Peneș first trained in swimming, handball and basketball, and changed to athletics because of her mother, a former athlete. In 1963, she won the national junior championships, setting a national record in the javelin throw, and since 1964 competed as a senior. After finishing her active career she worked as an athletics coach and official. In 1990, she joined the Romanian Olympic Committee, in 1995 became head of its international department, and in January–April 1999 served as its Secretary General.

Peneș died on 29 August 2024, at the age of 77.
