= Lucyna Krawcewicz =

Polish javelin thrower and chess player

Personal information
- Born: 14 March 1938 (age 88) Michalin, Polesie Voivodeship, now Ukraine

Chess career
- Country: Poland
- FIDE rating: 1559 (November 2021)
- Peak rating: 2085 (January 1995)

Lucyna Krawcewicz (born 14 March 1938) is a retired javelin thrower and chess player from Poland.

== Biography ==
Lucyna Krawcewicz represented her native country at the Summer Olympics 1968 where she took 12th place in the Women's javelin throw final. 24 times competed in the Polish national team matches (4 wins individual). She won Polish Seniors Championship in Athletics in 1965 and won three silver medals in 1964, 1967, 1968. Her personal record in javelin throw was 54.84 m (1968).

Krawcewicz was also a chess player. In 1972 she won first women's Polish Blitz Chess Championship in Lubliniec. During her career, she eight times appeared in the Polish Women's Chess Championship's finals (1972–1982) and reaching fifth place in 1974. Also competed three times in World Senior Chess Championship: in 2000 took 15th place, in 2002 – 13th, and in 2004 – 5th place.

In the past she also practiced handball and volleyball. She was a teacher of physical education and specialist in unconventional treatments.
