= Nina Marakina =

Ukrainian javelin thrower

Personal information
- Nationality: Ukrainian
- Born: 18 February 1947 (age 79) Kharkiv, Soviet Union

Sport
- Sport: Athletics
- Event: Javelin throw

Nina Marakina (born 18 February 1947) is a Ukrainian athlete. She competed in the women's javelin throw at the 1972 Summer Olympics.
