= Mária Kucserka =

Hungarian javelin thrower

Personal information
- Nationality: Hungarian
- Born: 13 December 1951 (age 74) Balatonfüred, Hungary

Sport
- Sport: Athletics
- Event: Javelin throw

Mária Kucserka (born 13 December 1951) is a Hungarian athlete. She competed in the women's javelin throw at the 1972 Summer Olympics.
