= Ameli Koloska =

German javelin thrower

Personal information
- Nationality: West German
- Born: 28 September 1944 (age 81) Dessau, Dessau-Roßlau, Germany
- Height: 172 cm (5 ft 8 in)
- Weight: 73 kg (161 lb)

Sport
- Sport: Athletics
- Event: javelin
- Club: VfL Wolfsburg; USC Mainz; TSV Nieder-Olm
Medal record
Women's athletics
Representing West Germany
European Championships
Silver medal – second place	1971 Helsinki	Javelin throw

Ameli Koloska (née Isermeyer; born 28 September 1944) is a retired West German javelin thrower who competed at two Olympic Games.

== Biography ==
Koloska who competed for the VfL Wolfsburg, USC Mainz and TSV Nieder-Olm sports clubs during her active career, won the British WAAA Championships title in the javelin throw event at the 1965 WAAA Championships.

At the 1968 Olympic Games in Mexico City, she represented West Germany in the javelin event finishing 7th.

Koloska regained the British WAAA Championships title at the 1970 WAAA Championships.

At the 1972 Olympics Games in Munich, she once again competed in the javelin throw competition and finished 18th.

== International competitions ==
Year	Competition	Venue	Position	Notes
1966	European Championships	Budapest, Hungary	11th	
1968	Olympic Games	Mexico City, Mexico	7th	
1971	European Championships	Helsinki, Finland	2nd	
1972	Olympic Games	Munich, West Germany	18th	
1974	European Championships	Rome, Italy	8th	
