= Angéla Németh =

Hungarian javelin thrower

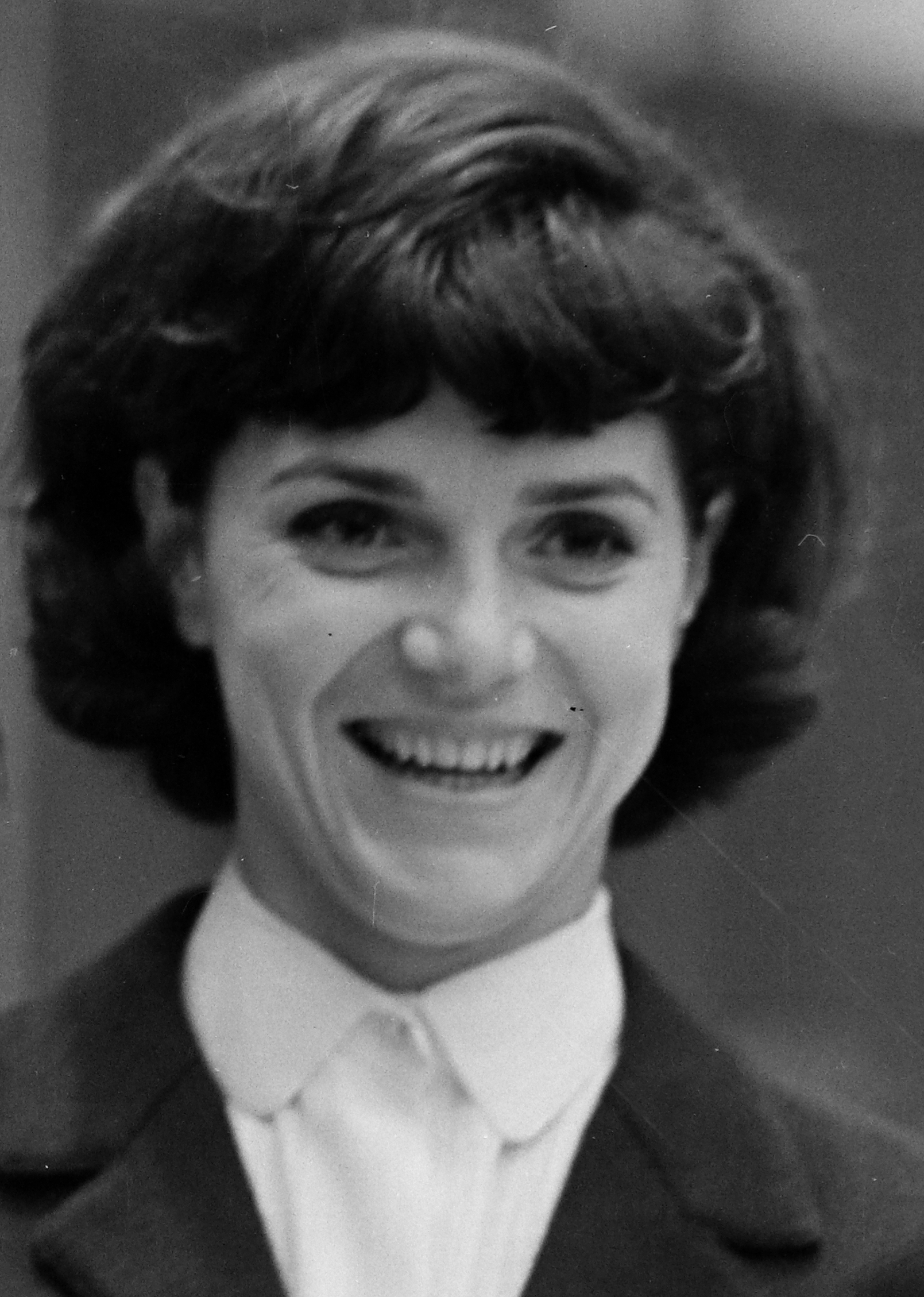
- Németh in 1968

Personal information
- Born: 18 February 1946 Budapest
- Died: 5 August 2014 (aged 68) Budapest
Medal record
Women's athletics
Representing Hungary
Olympic Games
Gold medal – first place	1968 Mexico City	Javelin throw
European Championships
Gold medal – first place	1969 Athens	Javelin throw

Angéla Németh (18 February 1946 – 5 August 2014) was a Hungarian track and field athlete, known as Angéla Ránky after her marriage.

In competing for her native country at the 1968 Summer Olympics in Mexico City, Mexico, she won the gold medal in the javelin.

She was named Hungarian Sportswoman of The Year in 1968 and 1969 after having won the Olympic title in 1968 and the European title in 1969.

Awards
Preceded by Annamária Kovács	Hungarian Sportswoman of The Year; 1968-1969	Succeeded by Andrea Gyarmati
