= Nataša Urbančič =

Slovenian javelin thrower

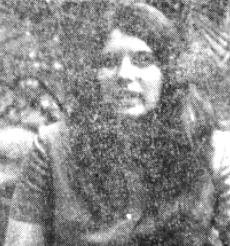

Personal information
- Born: 25 November 1945 Celje, Yugoslavia
- Died: 22 June 2011 (aged 65) Celje, Slovenia

Sport
- Sport: Track and field
Medal record
Representing Yugoslavia
European Championships
Bronze medal – third place	1974 Rome	Javelin throw

Nataša Urbančič (November 25, 1945 – June 22, 2011) was a Slovenian athlete. She was born in Celje, Slovenia.

Urbančič represented Yugoslavia at the 1968 and 1972 Summer Olympics in the javelin. She finished 6th and 5th, respectively. She won the bronze medal in javelin at the 1974 European Athletics Championships. Urbančič was named Slovenian Sportswoman of the Year six years in a row, from 1969 to 1974. She continued to throw into Masters athletics age groups, setting the current W55 world record.

Awards
Preceded by Jelica Pavličić	Yugoslav Sportswoman of the Year; 1974	Succeeded by Branka Batinić
